= 2016–17 Indian Women's League final round =

2016-17 Indian Women's League final round
Tournament details
- Country: India
- Dates: 28 January – 14 February 2017
- Teams: 6

Final positions
- Champions: Eastern Sporting Union (1st title)
- Runners-up: Rising Students

Tournament statistics
- Matches played: 18
- Goals scored: 69 (3.83 per match)
- Top goal scorer(s): Yumnam Kamala Devi (12 goals)

The 2016–17 Indian Women's League final round was played between six teams to decide the champion of Indian Women's League inaugural season. It was held from 28 January to 14 February at the Ambedkar Stadium in New Delhi. The league proper followed a round-robin format with the top four teams advancing to the semifinals.

Eastern Sporting Union and Rising Students entered round by topping their groups in the preliminary round. Alakhpura and Jeppiaar Institute entered after finishing second in their respective groups. Pune City and Aizawl joined them as direct entry teams. Eastern Sporting Union won the final beating Rising Students 3–0.

== Teams ==
Team	State	Entry
Eastern Sporting Union	Manipur	Preliminary
Rising Students	Odisha	Preliminary
Jeppiaar Institute	Puduchery	Preliminary
Alakhpura	Haryana	Preliminary
Pune City	Maharashtra	Direct
Aizawl	Mizoram	Direct

== Group stage ==
Pos	Team	Pld	W	D	L	GF	GA	GD	Pts	Qualification
1	Rising Students	5	4	0	1	20	3	+17	12	Semi Final
2	Eastern Sporting Union	5	4	0	1	15	4	+11	12	Semi Final
3	Alakhpura	5	2	2	1	8	4	+4	8	Semi Final
4	Pune City	5	2	1	2	6	8	−2	7	Semi Final
5	Jeppiaar Institute	5	1	1	3	5	18	−13	4	
6	Aizawl	5	0	0	5	5	22	−17	0	

Source: AIFF
Rules for classification: 1) points; 2) head-to-head points; 3) head-to-head goal difference; 4) goal difference; 5) number of goals scored; 6) drawing of lots

28 January 2017	Aizawl	1–6	Rising Students	Ambedkar Stadium, New Delhi
10:00 IST	Elizabeth Vanlalmawii 8'	Report	Anju Tamang 13', 88'; Pyari Xaxa 23'; Sasmita Malik 41', 77', 90'

28 January 2017	Jeppiaar Institute	1–7	Eastern Sporting Union	Ambedkar Stadium, New Delhi
14:00 IST	Sandhiya 63'	Report	K. Devi 44', 62', 83'; Kashmina 71', 88', 90'; Premi Devi 77'

29 January 2017	Pune City	0–0	Alakhpura	Ambedkar Stadium, New Delhi
12:00 IST		Report

30 January 2017	Eastern Sporting Union	1–2	Rising Students	Ambedkar Stadium, New Delhi
15:00 IST	Radharani Devi 8'	Report	Sasmita Malik 57'; Ashalata Devi 83'

31 January 2017	Alakhpura	6–2	Aizawl	Ambedkar Stadium, New Delhi
11:00 IST	Sanju Yadav 16', 46', 64'; Kavita Devi 21'; Deepika 36', 85'	Report	Diki 36'; Chawngthu 90'

31 January 2017	Pune City	1–0	Jeppiaar Institute	Ambedkar Stadium, New Delhi
15:00 IST	Dalima Chhibber 47'	Report

2 February 2017	Rising Students	0–1	Alakhpura	Ambedkar Stadium, New Delhi
10:00 IST		Report	Deepika 28'

2 February 2017	Eastern Sporting Union	3–1	Pune City	Ambedkar Stadium, New Delhi
14:00 IST	Kamala Devi 36', 48'; Kashmina 70'	Report	Ranikhetwala 65'

3 February 2017	Aizawl	2–3	Jeppiaar Institute	Ambedkar Stadium, New Delhi
15:00 IST	Elizabeth Vanlalmawii 11', 30'	Report	Sandhiya 5'; Pradeepa 16', 17'

5 February 2017	Pune City	0–5	Rising Students	Ambedkar Stadium, New Delhi
15:00 IST		Report	Jabamani Tudu 1', 14'; Anju Tamang 44'; Malik 47', 73'

6 February 2017	Jeppiaar Institute	1–1	Alakhpura	Ambedkar Stadium, New Delhi
11:00 IST	Sandhiya 44'	Report	Ritu 24'

6 February 2017	Aizawl	0–3	Eastern Sporting Union	Ambedkar Stadium, New Delhi
15:00 IST		Report	Kamala Devi 24'; Mandakini 70'; Kashmina 77'

8 February 2017	Rising Students	7–0	Jeppiaar Institute	Ambedkar Stadium, New Delhi
11:00 IST	Pyari 28', 42'; Lochana 32'; Tudu 68', 69', 76', 90+2'	Report

8 February 2017	Pune City	4–0	Aizawl	Ambedkar Stadium, New Delhi
15:00 IST	Roja 19'; Laura Estibeiro 31'; Dalima Chhibber 85'; Senorita Nongpluh 90+1'	Report

9 February 2017	Alakhpura	0–1	Eastern Sporting Union	Ambedkar Stadium, New Delhi
15:00 IST		Report	Kamala Devi 2'

== Knock out stage ==
=== Semi-finals ===
11 February 2017
11:00 IST

Rising Students	2–0	Pune City
Malik 30'; Pyari 65'	Report

Ambedkar Stadium, New Delhi

11 February 2017
15:00 IST

Eastern Sporting Union	4–1	Alakhpura
Kashmina 11'; Kamala Devi 39', 84', 90'	Report	Sanju 60'

Ambedkar Stadium, New Delhi

=== Final ===
14 February 2017
14:00 IST

Eastern Sporting Union	3–0	Rising Students
Kamala Devi 32', 66'; Irom Prameshwori Devi 57'	Report

Ambedkar Stadium, New Delhi

== Statistics ==
=== Top scorers ===
Rank	Player	Club	Goals
1	Yumnam Kamala Devi	Eastern Sporting Union	12
2	Sasmita Malik	Rising Student	7
3	Jabamani Tudu	Rising Student	6
3	M. K. Kashmina	Eastern Sporting Union	6
5	Pyari Xaxa	Rising Student	4
6	Sanju Yadav	Alakhpura	3
6	Deepika	Alakhpura	3
6	Elizabeth Vanlalmawii	Aizawl	3
6	Anju Tamang	Rising Student	3
6	R. Sandhiya	Jeppiaar Institute	3

=== Hat-tricks ===
Result column shows goal tally of player's team first.

No.	Player	For	Against	Goals	Result	Date	Ref.
1	(India) Sasmita Malik	Rising Student	Aizawl	3	6–1	28 January 2017	
2	(India) Yumnam Kamala Devi	Eastern Sporting Union	Jeppiaar Institute	3	7–1	28 January 2017	
3	(India) M. K. Kashmina	Eastern Sporting Union	Jeppiaar Institute	3	7–1	28 January 2017	
4	(India) Sanju Yadav	Alakhpura	Aizawl	3	6–2	31 January 2017	
5	(India) Jabamani Tudu	Rising Student	Jeppiaar Institute	4	7–0	8 February 2017	
6	(India) Yumnam Kamala Devi	Eastern Sporting Union	Alakhpura	3	4–1	11 February 2017	

== Awards ==
The following awards were announced at the end of the season, following the final on 14 February:

- Emerging Player: Jabamani Tudu
- Most Valuable Player: Umapati Devi
- Top Scorer: Kamala Devi
