= 2017–18 Indian Women's League final round =

2017-18 Indian Women's League final round
Tournament details
- Country: India
- Dates: 26 March – 14 April 2018
- Teams: 7

Final positions
- Champions: Rising Students Club (1st title)
- Runners-up: Eastern Sporting Union

Tournament statistics
- Matches played: 24
- Goals scored: 79 (3.29 per match)
- Top goal scorer(s): Bala Devi (KRYPHSA) (12 goals)

The 2017–18 Indian Women's League final round was played between seven teams to decide the champion of Indian Women's League second season. It was held from 26 March to 14 April 2018 at the JLN stadium in Shillong. The league proper followed a round-robin format with the top four teams advancing to the semifinals.

Eastern Sporting Union and Rising Student Club entered round by topping their groups in the preliminary round. Due to unavailability of teams from I-League and Indian Super League clubs, four more teams from the preliminary round Sethu FC, Indira Gandhi AS&E, Rush Soccer and KRYPHSA are promoted to final round. Gokulam Kerala FC women's team joined them to make it seven teams in the final round.

== Teams ==
Team	State	Entry
Eastern Sporting Union	Manipur	Preliminary
Rising Students Club	Odisha	Preliminary
Sethu	Tamil Nadu	Preliminary
Indira Gandhi AS&E	Puduchery	Preliminary
Rush Soccer	Maharashtra	Preliminary
KRYPHSA	Manipur	Preliminary
Gokulam Kerala	Kerala	Direct

== Group stage ==
Pos	Team	Pld	W	D	L	GF	GA	GD	Pts	Qualification
1	KRYPHSA	6	4	2	0	24	3	+21	14	Semi Final
2	Eastern Sporting Union	6	4	2	0	11	5	+6	14	Semi Final
3	Sethu	6	4	1	1	11	9	+2	13	Semi Final
4	Rising Students Club	6	3	1	2	11	5	+6	10	Semi Final
5	Gokulam Kerala	6	1	1	4	6	12	−6	4	
6	Indira Gandhi AS&E	6	1	0	5	8	29	−21	3	
7	Rush Soccer	6	0	1	5	4	12	−8	1	

Source: AIFF
Rules for classification: 1) points; 2) head-to-head points; 3) head-to-head goal difference; 4) goal difference; 5) number of goals scored; 6) drawing of lots

=== Matches ===
26 March 2018	Eastern Sporting Union	3–2	Indira Gandhi AS&E	Shillong
8:00 IST	Kashmina 25'; Prameshwori 47', 59'	Report	Paromita 43'; Sandhiya 48'	Stadium: JLN stadium

26 March 2018	Rising Student	2–0	Gokulam Kerala	Shillong
11:00 IST	Ngoubi Devi 73'; Anju Tamang 76'	Report		Stadium: JLN stadium

27 March 2018	KRYPHSA	5–0	Sethu	Shillong
11:00 IST	Bala 9'; Ratanbala Devi 16', 23'; Grace 62'; Asharani Devi 74'	Report		Stadium: JLN stadium

28 March 2018	Rush Soccer	1–2	Indira Gandhi AS&E	Shillong
8:00 IST	Chhibber 28'	Report	Pradeepa Sekar 15'; Sandhiya 74'	Stadium: JLN stadium

28 March 2018	Rising Student	0–1	Eastern Sporting Union	Shillong
17:00 IST		Report	Prameshwori 3'	Stadium: JLN stadium

29 March 2018	Sethu	2–0	Gokulam Kerala	Shillong
11:00 IST	Sabina 17'; Manisha 86'	Report		Stadium: JLN stadium

31 March 2018	KRYPHSA	1–1	Rising Student	Shillong
8:00 IST	Ratanbala Devi 77'	Report	Anju Tamang 76'	Stadium: JLN stadium

31 March 2018	Rush Soccer	1–3	Eastern Sporting Union	Shillong
11:00 IST	Chhibber 85'	Report	Kamala 7', 27'; Ranjibala Devi 90+3'	Stadium: JLN stadium

31 March 2018	Indira Gandhi AS&E	1–6	Gokulam Kerala	Shillong
15:00 IST	K Sumithra 24'	Report	Fazila Ikwaput 33', 44', 45+2', 58', 76'; Anita Rawat 81'	Stadium: JLN stadium

2 April 2018	Gokulam Kerala	0–2	Eastern Sporting Union	Shillong
8:00 IST		Report	Mandakini Devi 24'; Kamala 50'	Stadium: JLN stadium

2 April 2018	Rising Student	0–2	Sethu	Shillong
11:00 IST		Report	Sabina 47'; Manisha 90'	Stadium: JLN stadium

2 April 2018	KRYPHSA	2–0	Rush Soccer	Shillong
15:00 IST	Bala 21', 61'	Report		Stadium: JLN stadium

4 April 2018	Indira Gandhi AS&E	1–6	Rising Student	Shillong
8:00 IST	Amsavalli Narayanan 54'	Report	Pyari 9', 13'; Anju Tamang 27', 83'; Sanju 50', 87'	Stadium: JLN stadium

4 April 2018	Eastern Sporting Union	1–1	KRYPHSA	Shillong
14:30 IST	Roja Devi 45+1'	Report	Bala 14'	Stadium: JLN stadium

4 April 2018	Rush Soccer	2–3	Sethu	Shillong
17:30 IST	Samiksha 2'; Nisha 45'	Report	Sabina 22', 86'; Indumathi 44'	Stadium: JLN stadium

6 April 2018	Sethu	3–1	Indira Gandhi AS&E	Shillong
11:00 IST	Indumathi 27'; Sabina 76', 81'	Report	Pradeepa Sekar 35'	Stadium: JLN stadium

6 April 2018	Rush Soccer	0–0	Gokulam Kerala	Shillong
15:00 IST		Report		Stadium: JLN stadium

8 April 2018	Indira Gandhi AS&E	1–10	KRYPHSA	Shillong
8:00 IST	Pradeepa Sekar 63'	Report	Grace 2', 66'; Bala 17', 47', 73', 89'; Ratanbala Devi 35', 45+2', 64', 69'	Stadium: JLN stadium

8 April 2018	Rising Student	2–0	Rush Soccer	Shillong
11:00 IST	Pyari 37'; Jabamani 42'	Report		Stadium: JLN stadium

8 April 2018	Eastern Sporting Union	1–1	Sethu	Shillong
15:00 IST	Ranjibala Devi 5'	Report	Indumathi 14'	Stadium: JLN stadium

10 April 2018	KRYPHSA	5–0	Gokulam Kerala	Shillong
8:00 IST	Bala 6', 43', 45+1', 60'; Grace 25'	Report		Stadium: JLN stadium

== Knockout stage ==
=== Bracket ===
Semi-finals
1	KRYPHSA	0 (3)
4	Rising Student	0 (4)
3	Eastern Sporting Union	2
2	Sethu	0

Final
Rising Students Club	1 (5)
Eastern Sporting Union	1 (4)

=== Semi-finals ===
12 April 2018
11:00 IST

KRYPHSA	0–0 (a.e.t.)	Rising Students Club
	Report
Penalties
Bala (penalty missed); Ratanbala Devi (penalty missed); Ashalata (penalty scored); Ranjana Chanu (penalty scored); Grace (penalty scored)	3–4	(penalty missed) Sanju; (penalty scored) Ngoubi Devi; (penalty scored) Pyari; (penalty scored) Nandini Munda; (penalty scored) Jabamani

JLN Stadium, Shillong

12 April 2018
15:00 IST

Eastern Sporting Union	2–0 (a.e.t.)	Sethu
Prameshwori Devi 99'; Mandakini Devi 105'	Report

JLN Stadium, Shillong

=== Final ===
14 April 2018
15:00 IST

Rising Students Club	1–1 (a.e.t.)	Eastern Sporting Union
Sanju 71'	Report	Roja Devi 13'
Penalties
Sanju (penalty scored); Pyari (penalty scored); Anju Tamang (penalty missed); Sinulata Sahoo (penalty missed); Jabamani (penalty missed); Supriya (penalty scored); Tikina Samal (penalty scored); Suprava (penalty scored)	5–4	(penalty missed) Radharani Devi; (penalty scored) Mandakini Devi; (penalty missed) Premi Devi; (penalty missed) Umapati Devi; (penalty scored) Prameshwori Devi; (penalty scored) Manisha; (penalty scored) Sweety Devi; (penalty missed) Ranjibala Devi

JLN Stadium, Shillong

== Statistics ==
=== Top scorers ===
As of 14 April 2018

Rank	Player	Club	Goals
1	(India) Ngangom Bala Devi	KRYPHSA	12
2	(India) Ratanbala Devi	KRYPHSA	7
3	(Bangladesh) Sabina Khatun	Sethu	6
4	(Uganda) Fazila Ikwaput	Gokulam Kerala	5
5	(India) Anju Tamang	Rising Student	4
5	(India) Dangmei Grace	KRYPHSA	4
5	(India) Irom Prameshwori Devi	Eastern Sporting Union	4
8	(India) Yumnam Kamala Devi	Eastern Sporting Union	3
8	(India) Pradeepa Sekar	Indira Gandhi AS&E	3
8	(India) Pyari Xaxa	Rising Student	3
8	(India) Indumathi Kathiresan	Sethu	3
8	(India) Sanju Yadav	Rising Student	3

=== Hat-tricks ===
Result column shows goal tally of player's team first.

No.	Player	For	Against	Goals	Result	Date	Ref.
1	(Uganda) Fazila Ikwaput	Gokulam Kerala	Indira Gandhi AS&E	5	6−1	31 March 2018	
2	(India) Ratanbala Devi	KRYPHSA	Indira Gandhi AS&E	4	10−1	8 April 2018	
3	(India) Bala Devi	KRYPHSA	Indira Gandhi AS&E	4	10−1	8 April 2018	
4	(India) Bala Devi	KRYPHSA	Gokulam Kerala	4	5−0	10 April 2018	
