= 2018–19 Indian Women's League final round =

Tournament details
- Country: India
- Dates: 5–22 May 2019
- Teams: 12

Final positions
- Champions: Sethu (1st title)
- Runners-up: Manipur Police

Tournament statistics
- Matches played: 33
- Goals scored: 156 (4.73 per match)
- Top goal scorer(s): Bala Devi (26 goals)
- All statistics correct as of 22 May 2019.

The 2018–19 Indian Women's League final round was played between twelve teams divided into two groups to decide the champion of Indian Women's League third season. It was played between 5 and 22 May at the Guru Nanak Stadium in Ludhiana.

== Teams ==
Team	State/UT	Entry
Bangalore United FC	Bengaluru, Karnataka	2019 KSFA Women's League winners
Baroda Football Academy	Baroda, Gujrat	
Central SSB Women	Kolkata, West Bengal	2019 IFA Women League winners
FC Alakhpura	Alakhpura, Haryana	
FC Kolhapur City	Kolhapur, Maharashtra	2019 WIFA Women's championship winners
Hans Women FC	Delhi	
Gokulam Kerala	Kozhikode, Kerala	
Manipur Police	Imphal, Manipur	2018 AMFA Senior Women's Football League (BM Singh Trophy) winners
Panjim Footballers	Panaji, Goa	2019 GFA Vedanta Women's League winners
Rising Student's Club	Cuttack, Odisha	Direct entry
SAI-STC Cuttack	Cuttack, Odisha	2019 FAO Women's League winners
Sethu	Madurai, Tamil Nadu	

== Group stage ==
=== Cluster I ===
==== Table ====
Pos	Team	Pld	W	D	L	GF	GA	GD	Pts	Qualification
1	Gokulam Kerala	5	5	0	0	16	1	+15	15	Semi Final
2	Central SSB Women	5	4	0	1	10	7	+3	12	Semi Final
3	Hans Women FC	5	2	0	3	6	9	−3	6	
4	Panjim Footballers	5	1	1	3	7	13	−6	4	
5	Rising Student's Club	5	1	1	3	4	10	−6	4	
6	FC Alakhpura	5	1	0	4	3	6	−3	3	

Source: AIFF
Rules for classification: 1) points; 2) head-to-head points; 3) head-to-head goal difference; 4) goal difference; 5) number of goals scored; 6) drawing of lots

==== Matches ====
5 May 2019	Alakhpura	1–0	Hans Women	Ludhiana
8:00 IST	Samiksha Jakhar 17'	Report		Stadium: Guru Nanak Stadium; MVP: Anushka Samuel (Hans Women)

5 May 2019	Rising Student's Club	0–5	Gokulam Kerala	Ludhiana
16:30 IST		Report	Sanju 12'; Manisha 19', 72', 78'; Anju 28'	Stadium: Guru Nanak Stadium; MVP: Sanju Yadav (Gokulam Kerala)

7 May 2019	Gokulam Kerala	1–0	Alakhpura	Ludhiana
8:00 IST	Manisha 71'	Report		Stadium: Guru Nanak Stadium; MVP: Dalima Chhibber (Gokulam Kerala)

7 May 2019	Hans Women	3–2	Panjim Footballers	Ludhiana
8:00 IST	Anushka Samuel 31', 65'; Jyoti Ann Burrett 80'	Report	Karishma Shirvoikar 44', 76' (pen.)	Stadium: GHG Khalsa University; MVP: Anushka Samuel (Hans Women)

7 May 2019	Central SSB Women	1–0	Rising Student's Club	Ludhiana
16:30 IST	Sangita Basfore 43'	Report		Stadium: Guru Nanak Stadium; MVP: Rani Bowmick (Rising Student's Club)

9 May 2019	Alakhpura	1–2	Panjim Footballers	Ludhiana
8:00 IST	Samiksha Jakhar 71'	Report	Karishma Shirvoikar 9', 56'	Stadium: Guru Nanak Stadium; MVP: Scindia Saudatikar (Panjim Footballers)

9 May 2019	Central SSB Women	0–5	Gokulam Kerala	Ludhiana
16:30 IST		Report	Anju 1', 89'; Anita Rawat 39'; Sorokhaibam Ranjana Chanu 46'; Vanlalhriattiri Bawitlung 74'	Stadium: Guru Nanak Stadium; MVP: Anju Tamang (Gokulam Kerala)

11 May 2019	Hans Women	2–1	Rising Student's Club	Ludhiana
8:00 IST	Rita Casta 48'; Anushka Samuel 67'	Report	Sradhanjali Panda 90+1'	Stadium: Guru Nanak Stadium; MVP: Uchenna Rita Casta Ukachukwu (Hans Women)

11 May 2019	Panjim Footballers	0–2	Gokulam Kerala	Ludhiana
16:30 IST		Report	Sanju 29'; Anju 79'	Stadium: Guru Nanak Stadium; MVP: Sanju Yadav (Gokulam Kerala)

13 May 2019	Alakhpura	0–1	Central SSB Women	Ludhiana
8:00 IST		Report	Dular Marandi 11'	Stadium: Guru Nanak Stadium; MVP: Susmita Marandi (Central SSB Women)

13 May 2019	Rising Student's Club	1–1	Panjim Footballers	Ludhiana
16:30 IST	Satyabati Khadia 43'	Report	Karishma Shirvoikar 19'	Stadium: Guru Nanak Stadium; MVP: Ashika Gadekar (Panjim Footballers)

15 May 2019	Gokulam Kerala	3–1	Hans Women	Ludhiana
8:00 IST	Anju 10'; Ranjana Chanu 35'; Dalima 68'	Report	Anushka Samuel 23'	Stadium: Guru Nanak Stadium; MVP: Dalima Chhibber (Gokulam Kerala)

15 May 2019	Panjim Footballers	2–6	Central SSB Women	Ludhiana
16:00 IST	Karishma Shirvoikar 4', 89'	Report	Sangita Basfore 12', 57'; Sumila Chanu 55', 60'; Ranjita Devi 67', 81'	Stadium: Guru Nanak Stadium; MVP: Sangita Basfore (Central SSB Women)

17 May 2019	Central SSB Women	2–0	Hans Women	Ludhiana
8:00 IST	Anibala Devi 30'; Sandhya Kachhap 89'	Report		Stadium: Guru Nanak Stadium; MVP: Anibala Devi (Central SSB Women)

17 May 2019	Rising Student's Club	2–1	Alakhpura	Ludhiana
16:00 IST	Sibani Sharma 8'; Ashrita Kangadi 30'		Raveena 28'	Stadium: Guru Nanak Stadium; MVP: Sibani Sharma (Rising Student's Club)

=== Cluster II ===
==== Table ====
Pos	Team	Pld	W	D	L	GF	GA	GD	Pts	Qualification
1	Sethu	5	5	0	0	34	4	+30	15	Semi Final
2	Manipur Police	5	4	0	1	37	8	+29	12	Semi Final
3	FC Kolhapur City	5	2	1	2	8	20	−12	7	
4	SAI-STC Cuttack	5	2	0	3	5	21	−16	6	
5	Bangalore United FC	5	1	1	3	3	15	−12	4	
6	Baroda Football Academy	5	0	0	5	4	23	−19	0	

Source: AIFF
Rules for classification: 1) points; 2) head-to-head points; 3) head-to-head goal difference; 4) goal difference; 5) number of goals scored; 6) drawing of lots

==== Matches ====
6 May 2019	Kolhapur City	4–3	Baroda Football Academy	Ludhiana
8:00IST	Kashmina MS 45', 62'; Prakshita Mithari 82'; Kamala Devi 90+3'	Report	Ayomode Ayobaba 26' (o.g.); Mona 35'; Heta Shukla 89'	Stadium: Guru Nanak Stadium; MVP: Kashmina MS (Kolhapur City)

6 May 2019	Manipur Police	4–6	Sethu	Ludhiana
16:30 IST	N Sowmiya 22' (o.g.); Bala Devi 42', 90'; Pramodini Chanu 65'	Report	Sabitra 1', 16', 34', 45+2'; Dangmei 66', 75'	Stadium: Guru Nanak Stadium; MVP: Sabitra Bhandari (Sethu)

8 May 2019	Sethu	3–0	Bangalore United	Ludhiana
8:00 IST	Sabitra 11'; Sandhiya 42'; Anita Basnet 75'	Report		Stadium: Guru Nanak Stadium; MVP: Sandhiya Ranganathan (Sethu)

8 May 2019	SAI-STC Cuttack	0–10	Manipur Police	Ludhiana
16:30 IST		Report	Bala Devi 10', 15', 41', 45+2', 54', 78', 83'; Salam Rinaroy Devi 38', 81'; Heigrujam Daya Devi 58'	Stadium: Guru Nanak Stadium; MVP: Ngangom Bala Devi (Manipur Police)

10 May 2019	Baroda Football Academy	1–6	Manipur Police	Ludhiana
8:00 IST	Mona 33'	Report	Heigrujam Daya Devi 7'; Bala Devi 13', 37', 45+3', 67'; Irom Prameshwori Devi 90'	Stadium: Guru Nanak Stadium; MVP: Ngangom Bala Devi (Manipur Police)

10 May 2019	SAI-STC Cuttack	0–9	Sethu	Ludhiana
8:00 IST		Report	Ratanbala Devi 4', 29', 88'; Sandhiya 9', 87'; Indumathi 45+2'; Dangmei 66'; Subha Patra 73' (o.g.); Sabitra 81'	Stadium: GHG Khalsa University; MVP: Nongmaithem Ratanbala Devi (Sethu)

10 May 2019	Bangalore United	1–1	Kolhapur City	Ludhiana
16:30 IST	Paromita Sit 47'	Report	Pratiksha Mithari 80'	Stadium: Guru Nanak Stadium; MVP: Crystal Ann Pinto (Bangalore United)

12 May 2019	Baroda Football Academy	0–4	SAI-STC Cuttack	Ludhiana
8:00 IST		Report	Susmita Dalei 50'; Deepa Nayak 53'; Niketa Bishi 87'; Rashmi Jee 90'	Stadium: Guru Nanak Stadium; MVP: Arati Sethi (SAI-STC Cuttack)

12 May 2019	Kolhapur City	0–9	Sethu	Ludhiana
16:30 IST		Report	Dangmei 3', 20' (pen.); Ratanbala Devi 24', 28', 81'; Jabamani 45+3' (o.g.); Sabitra 57', 67', 77'	Stadium: Guru Nanak Stadium; MVP: Nongmaithem Ratanbala Devi (Sethu)

14 May 2019	Bangalore United	0–1	SAI-STC Cuttack	Ludhiana
8:00 IST		Report	Deepa Nayak 75' (pen.)	Stadium: Guru Nanak Stadium; MVP: Jyoti Kumari (SAI-STC Cuttack)

14 May 2019	Manipur Police	7–1	Kolhapur City	Ludhiana
16:30 IST	Irom Prameshwori Devi 12', 90'; Bala Devi 14', 45+3', 79'; Heigrujam Daya Devi 58'; Pramodini Chanu 75'	Report	Crystal Nnenna Eke 21'	Stadium: Guru Nanak Stadium; MVP: Heigrujam Daya Devi (Manipur Police)

16 May 2019	Kolhapur City	2–0	SAI-STC Cuttack	Ludhiana
8:00 IST	Kamala Devi 7'; Renu 33'	Report		Stadium: Guru Nanak Stadium; MVP: Jyoti Kumari (SAI-STC Cuttack)

16 May 2019	Baroda Football Academy	0–2	Bangalore United	Ludhiana
16:00 IST		Report	Sivasankari Arumugam 36'; Paromita Sit 86'	Stadium: Guru Nanak Stadium; MVP: Amsavalli Narayanan (Bangalore United)

18 May 2019	Sethu	7–0	Baroda Football Academy	Ludhiana
8:00 IST	Sandhiya 34', 37', 39', 87'; Ashalata Devi 41'; Indumathi 75'; Ratanbala Devi 81'	Report		Stadium: Guru Nanak Stadium; MVP: Loitongbam Ashalata Devi (Sethu)

18 May 2019	Manipur Police	10–0	Bangalore United	Ludhiana
16:00 IST	Bala Devi 3', 15', 16', 23', 59', 78'; Heigrujam Daya Devi 21', 36'; Salam Rinaroy Devi 58'; Moirangthem Mandakini Devi 74'	Report		Stadium: Guru Nanak Stadium; MVP: Ngangom Bala Devi (Manipur Police)

== Knock–out stage ==
Top two teams from each group progressed to the semifinals, played on 20 May before the final which was held on 22 May.

=== Bracket ===
Semi-finals
1	Gokulam Kerala	2
4	Manipur Police	4
3	Sethu	8
2	Central SSB Women	1

Final
Manipur Police	1
Sethu	3

=== Semi-finals ===
20 May 2019
8:00 IST

Gokulam Kerala	2–4	Manipur Police
Phanjoubam Bina Devi 34' (o.g.); Sorokhaibam Ranjana Chanu 47' (pen.)	Report	Bala Devi 15' (pen.), 68' (pen.), 80', 81'

Guru Nanak Stadium, Ludhiana

20 May 2019
16:00 IST

Sethu	8–1	Central SSB Women
Dangmei 33', 45+4', 53'; Sabitra 42', 60', 65', 89'; Ratanbala Devi 72'	Report	Dular Marandi 70'

Guru Nanak Stadium, Ludhiana

=== Final ===
22 May 2019
16:00 IST

Manipur Police	1–3	Sethu
Gurumayum Radharani Devi 44'	Report	Thokchom Umapati Devi 56' (o.g.); Sabitra 61', 70'

Guru Nanak Stadium, Ludhiana

== Statistics ==
=== Top scorers ===
As of 22 May 2019

Rank	Player	Club	Goals
1	(India) Ngangom Bala Devi	Manipur Police	26
2	(Nepal) Sabitra Bhandari	Sethu	15
3	(India) Dangmei Grace	Sethu	8
3	(India) Nongmaithem Ratanbala Devi	Sethu	8
5	(India) Karishma Shirvoikar	Panjim Footballers	7
5	(India) Sandhiya Ranganathan	Sethu	7
7	(India) Anju Tamang	Gokulam Kerala	5
7	(India) Heigrujam Daya Devi	Manipur Police	5
9	(India) Manisha Kalyan	Gokulam Kerala	4
9	(India) Anushka Samuel	Hans Women's	4
11	(India) Irom Prameshwori Devi	Manipur Police	3
11	(India) Sangita Basfore	Central SSB Women's	3
11	(India) Salam Rinaroy Devi	Manipur Police	3
11	(India) Sorokhaibam Ranjana Chanu	Gokulam Kerala	3

=== Hat-tricks ===
Result column shows goal tally of player's team first.

No.	Player	For	Against	Goals	Result	Date	Ref.
1	(India) Manisha Kalyan	Gokulam Kerala	Rising Students	3	5−0	5 May 2019	
2	(Nepal) Sabitra Bhandari	Sethu	Manipur Police	4	6−4	6 May 2019	
3	(India) Bala Devi	Manipur Police	SAI-ATC Cuttack	7	10−0	8 May 2019	
4	(India) Bala Devi	Manipur Police	Baroda	4	6−1	10 May 2019	
5	(India) Ratanbala Devi	Sethu	SAI-ATC Cuttack	3	9−0	10 May 2019	
6	(India) Ratanbala Devi	Sethu	Kohlapur City	3	9−0	12 May 2019	
7	(Nepal) Sabitra Bhandari	Sethu	Kohlapur City	3	9−0	12 May 2019	
8	(India) Bala Devi	Manipur Police	Kohlapur City	3	7−1	14 May 2019	
9	(India) Sandhiya Ranganathan	Gokulam Kerala	Rising Students	4	7−0	18 May 2019	
10	(India) Bala Devi	Manipur Police	Bangalore United	6	10−0	18 May 2019	
11	(India) Bala Devi	Manipur Police	Gokulam Kerala	4	4−2	20 May 2019	
12	(India) Grace Dangmei	Sethu	Central SSB	4	6−4	20 May 2019	
13	(Nepal) Sabitra Bhandari	Sethu	Central SSB	4	6−4	20 May 2019	

== Season awards ==
Hero Indian Women's League 2018–19 awards.

Award	Recipient
Highest Scorer	Bala Devi (Manipur Police Sports Club)
Best Goalkeeper	Maibam Linthoingambi Devi (Gokulam Kerala Women)
Most Valuable Player	Sandhiya Ranganathan (Sethu FC)
Emerging Player	Nongmaithem Ratanbala Devi (Sethu FC)
