= 2016 SAFF Women's Championship squads =

The 2016 SAFF Women's Championship will be the fourth edition of the SAFF Women's Championship, the biennial international women's football championship contested by the national teams of the South Asian Football Federation (SAFF). The tournament will take place in India from 26 December 2016 to 4 January 2017, after the country was awarded hosting rights in January 2016. This will be the first time India will have hosted the SAFF Women's Championship.

Only players in these squads were eligible to take part in the tournament.

== Group A ==
=== Nepal ===
The final 20-player squad was announced on 9 December 2016.

Head coach: Kumar Thapa

Note: Flags indicate national team as defined under FIFA eligibility rules; some limited exceptions apply. Players may hold more than one non-FIFA nationality.

No.	Pos.	Nation	Player
1	GK	NEP	Namita Dali
19	GK	NEP	Anjila Subba
22	GK	NEP	Anjana Magar
2	DF	NEP	Gita Rana
5	DF	NEP	Punam Jargha Magar
6	DF	NEP	Hira Kumari Bhujel
7	DF	NEP	Anchali Waiwa
9	DF	NEP	Mana Maya Limbu
10	DF	NEP	Kabita Dhimal
12	MF	NEP	Renuka Nagarkoti

No.	Pos.	Nation	Player
16	MF	NEP	Sapana Lama
18	MF	NEP	Dipa Adhikari
23	MF	NEP	Anita Basnet
24	MF	NEP	Dipa Rai
25	MF	NEP	Manjali Kumari Yonjan
37	FW	NEP	Sabitra Bhandari
44	FW	NEP	Krishna Khatri
45	FW	NEP	Sharmila Thapa
49	FW	NEP	Saru Limbu
52	FW	NEP	Nirmala BK

=== Sri Lanka ===
The final 20-member squad for Sri Lanka was announced on 24 December.

Head coach: M. Jusmin

Note: Flags indicate national team as defined under FIFA eligibility rules; some limited exceptions apply. Players may hold more than one non-FIFA nationality.

No.	Pos.	Nation	Player
—	GK	SRI	H. Kumari
—	GK	SRI	A. Wijerathna
—	GK	SRI	S. Subasinghe
—	DF	SRI	C.S. Francis
—	DF	SRI	I.M. Withanage
—	DF	SRI	R. Gunawardana
—	DF	SRI	H. Jayasinghe
—	MF	SRI	T.K. Angela
—	MF	SRI	A.C. Sarukkali
—	MF	SRI	Praveena Perera

No.	Pos.	Nation	Player
—	MF	SRI	G. Madushani
—	FW	SRI	Kanakkahewage Silva
—	FW	SRI	Chalani Ekanayake
—	FW	SRI	T. Thushani
—	FW	SRI	D. Leelanthi
—	FW	SRI	I. Liyanage
—	FW	SRI	K. Karunarathna
—		SRI	A. Kumari
—		SRI	M.K. Godawelage
—		SRI	H. Dayananda

== Group B ==
=== Bangladesh ===
The final 20-member squad for Bangladesh was announced.

Head coach: Golam Robbani

Note: Flags indicate national team as defined under FIFA eligibility rules; some limited exceptions apply. Players may hold more than one non-FIFA nationality.

No.	Pos.	Nation	Player
1	GK	BAN	Rowshan Ara
16	GK	BAN	Sabina Akter
13	GK	BAN	Mahmuda Akter
2	DF	BAN	Sheuli Azim
3	DF	BAN	Shamsunnahar
4	DF	BAN	Mossammat Nargis Khatun
5	DF	BAN	Masura Parvin
6	DF	BAN	Nilufa Yesmin Nila
18	DF	BAN	Anai Mogini
7	MF	BAN	Sanjida Akhter

No.	Pos.	Nation	Player
8	MF	BAN	Mishrat Jahan Moushumi
19	MF	BAN	Marzia Akter
15	MF	BAN	Maria Manda
14	MF	BAN	Israt Jahan Ratna
9	FW	BAN	Mosammat Sirat Jahan Shopna
10	FW	BAN	Sabina Khatun (Captain)
12	FW	BAN	Krishna Rani Sarkar
11	FW	BAN	Maynu Marma (Vice-captain)
17	FW	BAN	Munmun Akter
20	FW	BAN	Anuching Mogini

=== India ===
The final 20-member squad for India was announced on 22 December.

Head coach: Sajid Dar

Note: Flags indicate national team as defined under FIFA eligibility rules; some limited exceptions apply. Players may hold more than one non-FIFA nationality.

No.	Pos.	Nation	Player
—	GK	IND	Aditi Chauhan
—	GK	IND	Elangbam Panthoi Chanu
—	GK	IND	Vijaya Kumar Vinitha
—	DF	IND	Gurumayum Radharani Devi
—	DF	IND	Loitongbam Ashalata Devi
—	DF	IND	Manisa Panna
—	DF	IND	Thokchom Umapati Devi
—	DF	IND	Dalima Chhibber
—	DF	IND	Jabamani Tudu
—	MF	IND	Sangita Basfore

No.	Pos.	Nation	Player
—	MF	IND	Sasmita Malik
—	MF	IND	Yumlembam Premi Devi
—	MF	IND	Indumathi Kathiresan
—	MF	IND	Sumithra Kamaraj
—	FW	IND	Grace Dangmei
—	FW	IND	Irom Prameshwori Devi
—	FW	IND	Ngangom Bala Devi
—	FW	IND	Salam Rinaroy Devi
—	FW	IND	Yumnam Kamala Devi
—	FW	IND	Sanju
