= 2016–17 Indian Women's League preliminary round =

Indian Women's League preliminary round
Tournament details
- Country: India
- Dates: 17–26 October 2016
- Teams: 10

Tournament statistics
- Matches played: 16
- Goals scored: 114 (7.13 per match)
- Top goal scorer: Sanju Yadav (11 goals)

The 2016–17 Indian Women's League preliminary round was the qualifying round that decided the two teams out of the participating ten that to enter the final round of the Indian Women's League. The ten teams were split into two groups of five each and the top-ranked team from each group qualified for the final rounds. Eastern Sporting Union and Rising Student Club qualified for the final round.

== Teams ==
Group A	State	Group B	State
Alakhpura	Haryana	Eastern Sporting Union	Manipur
Bodyline	Maharashtra	Jeppiaar Institute	Pondicherry
Quartz	Kerala	KRYPHSA	Manipur
Rising Student	Odisha	Sudeva Moonlight	Delhi
Royal Wahingdoh	Meghalaya	Uttar Pradesh FC	Uttar Pradesh

== Group A ==
=== Table ===
Pos	Team	Pld	W	D	L	GF	GA	GD	Pts	Qualification
1	Rising Student	4	4	0	0	21	1	+20	12	Final Round
2	Alakhpura	4	3	0	1	27	2	+25	9	Final Round
3	Quartz	4	2	0	2	8	10	−2	6	
4	Bodyline	4	1	0	3	9	6	+3	3	
5	Royal Wahingdoh	4	0	0	4	0	46	−46	0	

Source: Twitter
Rules for classification: 1) points; 2) goal difference; 3) goals scored; 4) head-to-head result .

=== Fixtures and results ===
17 October 2016
08:00 IST

Bodyline	0–4	Alakhpura
	Report	Sanju 13', 29', 49'; Kavita 90+2'

Police Ground, Cuttack

18 October 2016
08:00 IST

New Quartz	1–5	Rising Student
Manpreet 41'		Malik 9'; Pyari 17', 64'; Pinki 31'; Ngoubi Devi 66'

19 October 2016
08:00 IST

Royal Wahingdoh	0–9	Bodyline
		Anju Tamang 21', 25', 33', 44'; Karen Paisley 28', 66'; Aditi Shetty 64'; Rhea 78', 86'

20 October 2016
08:00 IST

Alakhpura	5–0	New Quartz
Deepika 11', 50', 82'; Sanju 58'; Nisha 75'

21 October 2016
08:00 IST

Royal Wahingdoh	0–13	Rising Student
		Pyari 5', 13', 27', 41', 45+1', 63', 75'; Sangita 47', 53', 66'; Mallik 65'; Arati Anima 74'; Panna 79'

22 October 2016
08:00 IST

Bodyline	0–1	New Quartz
		Mamta 90+2'

23 October 2016
14:30 IST

Alakhpura	18–0	Royal Wahingdoh
Kavita 4', 45', 61', 77'; Sanju 9', 10', 13', 15', 33', 53', 56'; Deepika 18', 36', 62', 89', 90+1'; Mamata 57', 69'

24 October 2016
08:00 IST

Rising Student	1–0	Bodyline
Pinki 13'

25 October 2016
14:30 IST

New Quartz	6–0	Royal Wahingdoh
Mamta 33'; Manpreet 36', 38', 78'; Reshmi 54'; Tara 90'

26 October 2016
08:00 IST

Rising Student	2–0	Alakhpura
Jabamani 52'; Pyari 90'

== Group B ==
=== Table ===
Pos	Team	Pld	W	D	L	GF	GA	GD	Pts	Qualification
1	Eastern Sporting Union	3	3	0	0	20	3	+17	9	Final Round
2	Jeppiaar Institute	3	2	0	1	21	3	+18	6	Final Round
3	KRYPHSA	3	1	0	2	8	7	+1	3	
4	Uttar Pradesh	3	0	0	3	0	36	−36	0	
5	Sudeva Moonlight	0	0	0	0	0	0	0	0	Withdrew (Note: Withdrew from the league due to unknown reasons.)

Source: Twitter
Rules for classification: 1) points; 2) goal difference; 3) goals scored; 4) head-to-head result .

=== Fixtures and results ===
17 October 2016
14:30 IST

Jeppiaar Institute	2–3	Eastern Sporting Union
K Sumithra 17'; M Nandhini 34'	Report	Bala Devi 6', 18'; Kamala Devi 64'

19 October 2016
14:30 IST

Eastern Sporting Union	13–0	Uttar Pradesh
Kamala Devi 7', 59'; Umapati 26'; Mandakini 30'; Premi Devi 39', 41', 72'; Prameshwori 42'; Bala 47', 52'; Bembem Devi 66'; Manda Devi 76'; Haokip 89'

21 October 2016
14:30 IST

Uttar Pradesh	0–7	KRYPHSA
		Grace 8', 15', 51', 65'; Bindyarani 18'; Roshni 28', 63'

23 October 2016
08:00 IST

KRYPHSA	0–3	Jeppiaar Institute
		Sandhya 45+1'; Indumathi 55', 75'

25 October 2016
08:00 IST

Eastern Sporting Union	4–1	KRYPHSA
Bembem Devi 59', 83'; Mandakini 65', 85'		Bindyarani 15'

26 October 2016
14:30 IST

Uttar Pradesh	0–16	Jeppiaar Institute
		Muthu Selvi 5'; Pradeepa 12', 42'; Indumati 22', 24', 51', 71', 78'; Nandhini 38', 46'; Juki 43'; K Sumithra 59', 65', 90'; Varalakshmi 67'; Amsavalli 89'

== Goalscorers ==
11 Goals

- Sanju Yadav (Alakhpura)

10 Goals

- Pyari Xaxa (Rising Students)

8 Goals

- Deepika (Alakhpura)

5 Goals

- Kavita (Alakhpura)
- Indumathi Kathiresan (Jeppiaar Institute)

4 Goals

- Anju Tamang (Bodyline)
- Manpreet (Quartz)
- Bala (Eastern Sporting Union)
- Dangmei Grace (KRYPHSA)
- K. Sumithra (Jeppiaar Institute)

3 Goals

- Kamala Devi (Eastern Sporting Union)
- Premi Devi (Eastern Sporting Union)
- Mandakini (Eastern Sporting Union)
- Oinam Bembem Devi (Eastern Sporting Union)
- Sangita Basfore (Rising Students)

2 Goals

- Mamata (Alakhpura)
- Sasmita Malik (Rising Students)
- Pinki (Rising Students)
- Karen Paisley (Bodyline)
- Rhea (Bodyline)
- Mamta (Quartz)
- Bindyarani (KRYPHSA)
- Roshni (KRYPHSA)
- Pradeepa (Jeppiaar Institute)
- Nandhini (Jeppiaar Institute)

1 Goals

- Sandhya (Jeppiaar Institute)
- M Nandhini (Jeppiaar Institute)
- Umapati (Eastern Sporting Union)
- Parameshwari (Eastern Sporting Union)
- Manda Devi (Eastern Sporting Union)
- Haokip (Eastern Sporting Union)
- Prameshwori (Eastern Sporting Union)
- Nisha (Alakhpura)
- Ngoubi Devi (Rising Students)
- Arati Anima (Rising Students)
- Manisha Panna (Rising Students)
- Jabamani Tudu (Rising Students)
- Aditi Shetty (Bodyline)
- Reshmi (Quartz)
- Tara (Quartz)
- Muthu Selvi (Jeppiaar Institute)
- Juki (Jeppiaar Institute)
- Varalakshmi (Jeppiaar Institute)
- Amsavalli (Jeppiaar Institute)
