= List of Indian women's football champions =

- Indian Women's League (2016–present)

Country
- India

Founded
- 2016

Number of teams
- 8

Current champions
- East Bengal (2nd title) (2025–26)

Most successful club(s)
- Gokulam Kerala (3 titles)

The Indian women's football champions are the winners of the highest national league in women's football in India. In 2016, the Indian Women's League was incorporated.

A proper league system for women's football was established in 2016 with the commencement of Indian Women's League (IWL), The league was launched as India's first professional football league for women with the aim to increase the player pool for India national team. Since 2019–20 season, the clubs that become champions are granted an opportunity to play in the AFC Women's Club Championship, the top tier women's club football competition in Asia, which was succeeded by the AFC Women's Champions League from the 2023–24 season.

== National League Champions ==
Season	Champions (number of titles)	Runners-up	Third place	Winning coach	Top scorer (club)	Goals
2016–17	Eastern Sporting Union	Rising Students	– (Note: The tournament was organised as a knock-out tournament and third place decider matches weren't played, hence no team was recognised for the third place.)	(India) Bembem Devi Oinam	(India) Kamala Devi Yumnam (Eastern Sporting Union)	12
2017–18	Rising Students	Eastern Sporting Union	–	(India) Sukla Dutta	(India) Bala Devi Ngangom (KRYPHSA)	12
2018–19	Sethu	Manipur Police	–	(India) Amrutha Aravind	(India) Bala Devi Ngangom (Manipur Police)	26
2019–20	Gokulam Kerala	KRYPHSA	–	(India) Priya P. V.	(Nepal) Sabitra Bhandari (Gokulam Kerala)	16
2020–21	Cancelled					
2021–22	Gokulam Kerala	Sethu	Kickstart	(India) Anthony Andrews	(Ghana) Elshaddai Acheampong (Gokulam Kerala)	20
2022–23	Gokulam Kerala	Kickstart	–	(India) Anthony Andrews	(Nepal) Sabitra Bhandari (Gokulam Kerala)	29
2023–24	Odisha	Gokulam Kerala	Kickstart	(India) Crispin Chettri	(Uganda) Fazila Ikwaput (Gokulam Kerala)	20
2024–25	East Bengal	Gokulam Kerala	Sribhumi	(India) Anthony Andrews	(Uganda) Fazila Ikwaput (Gokulam Kerala)	24
2025–26	East Bengal	Sethu	Kickstart	(India) Anthony Andrews	(Uganda) Fazila Ikwaput (East Bengal)	20

== Total titles won ==
Club	Winners	Runners-up	Winning seasons	Runner-up seasons
Gokulam Kerala	3	2	2019–20, 2021–22, 2022–23	2023–24, 2024–25
East Bengal	2	–	2024–25, 2025–26	–
Sethu	1	2	2018–19	2021–22, 2025–26
Eastern Sporting Union	1	1	2016–17	2017–18
Rising Students	1	1	2017–18	2016–17
Odisha	1	–	2023–24	–
Manipur Police	–	1	–	2018–19
KRYPHSA	–	1	–	2019–20
Kickstart	–	1	–	2022–23

=== By state ===
State	Championships	Clubs
Kerala	3	Gokulam Kerala (3)
Odisha	2	Rising Students (1), Odisha (1)
West Bengal	2	East Bengal (2)
Manipur	1	Eastern Sporting Union (1)
Tamil Nadu	1	Sethu (1)

=== By city/town ===
City / Town	State	Championships	Clubs
Kozhikode	Kerala	3	Gokulam Kerala (3)
Kolkata	West Bengal	2	East Bengal (2)
Imphal	Manipur	1	Eastern Sporting Union (1)
Cuttack	Odisha	1	Rising Students (1)
Madurai	Tamil Nadu	1	Sethu (1)
Bhubaneswar	Odisha	1	Odisha (1)

=== By region ===
Region	Championships
South	4
East	4
Northeast	1

== See also ==
- Indian Women's League
- Football in India
- Women's football in India
