= Sweety Devi Ngangbam =

Indian footballer

Sweety Devi
Personal information
- Full name: Sweety Devi Ngangbam
- Date of birth: 1 December 1999 (age 26)
- Place of birth: Langthabal, Imphal West, Manipur, India
- Height: 1.70 m (5 ft 7 in)
- Position: Defender

Team information
- Current team: East Bengal
- Number: 2

Senior career*
Years	Team	Apps	(Gls)
2017–2018	Eastern Sporting Union		
2018–2019	Sethu	7	(0)
2019–2020	KRYPHSA	7	(1)
2021–2022	Kickstart	8	(0)
2022–2024	Odisha	9	(0)
2024–	East Bengal	10	(0)

International career^{‡}
2014	India U16		
2016	India U19	3	(1)
2018–	India	70	(1)
- * Club domestic league appearances and goals as of 14 February 2017 ‡ National team caps and goals as of 10 March 2026

Sweety Devi Ngangbam (Meitei: Ngangbam Sweety Devi, born 1 December 1999) is an Indian professional footballer from Manipur. She plays as a defender for the Indian Women's League club East Bengal and captains the India women's national team.

== Early life ==
Sweety is from Manipur, India. She learnt basics of the game from her father Ngangbam Ruhikanta Singh, who is a football coach. He made her play with the boys which improved her game. In her first year in the Indian Women's League, she played for Eastern Sporting Union.

== International career ==
Sweety made her junior debut for India in 2014 for the India under 16 team and later played the AFC under 19 qualifiers in 2016.

She made her Senior India debut in 2017 against South Korea in the 2018 AFC Women's Asia Cup qualification. Later, she became a regular partner to then skipper Ashalata Devi in the defence.

In November 2019, she played the first round of the Tokyo 2020 Olympics qualifying tournament at Myanmar.

She also scored a goal for the senior team in the match against UAE on 2 October 2021, which India won 4–1 at full-time.

In 2022, she played the AFC Women's Asian Cup. In August 2023, she played the 2022 Asian Games at Hangzhou, China.

In 2025, she was part of the Indian team that participated in the AFC Women's Asian Cup Qualifier 2026 at Chiang Mai, Thailand. India beat hosts Thailand in the fourth and final qualifiers Group B match at the 700th Anniversary of Chiang Mai Stadium on 5 July 2025. She was made the captain against Mongolia. Sweety said it was special to qualify as Women's Asian Cup is the road to the FIFA Women's World Cup. In 2022, she missed the qualifier at the AFC Women's Asian Cup 2022, which India hosted, due to COVID outbreak in the Indian camp.

== Personal life ==
She is in a relationship with the Indian footballer Chinglensana Singh Konsham.

== Career statistics ==
=== International ===
As of 10 March 2026

National team	Year	Caps	Goals
India	2017	2	0
India	2018	3	0
India	2019	26	0
India	2021	12	1
India	2022	4	0
India	2023	12	0
India	2024	0	0
India	2025	8	0
India	2026	3	0
Total		70	1

==== International goals ====
Scores and results list India's goal tally first.

List of international goals scored by Ngangbam Sweety Devi
No.	Date	Venue	Opponent	Score	Result	Competition
1.	2 October 2021	Theyab Awana Stadium, Dubai, United Arab Emirates	United Arab Emirates	3–0	4–0	Friendly

== Honours ==
India

- SAFF Women's Championship: 2019
- South Asian Games Gold medal: 2019

East Bengal

- SAFF Women's Club Championship: 2025
- Indian Women's League: 2024–25, 2025–26

Odisha

- Indian Women's League: 2023–24

Sethu

- Indian Women's League: 2018–19

KRYPHSA

- Indian Women's League runner-up: 2019–20

Manipur

- Rajmata Jijabai Trophy: 2019–20
- National Games Gold medal: 2022
