= Ranjana Chanu Sorokhaibam =

Indian footballer

Ranjana Chanu
Personal information
- Full name: Ranjana Chanu Sorokhaibam
- Date of birth: 10 March 1999 (age 27)
- Place of birth: Manipur, India
- Position: Defender

Team information
- Current team: Kickstart
- Number: 14

Senior career*
Years	Team	Apps	(Gls)
2018	Kryphsa		
2019–2022	Gokulam Kerala		
2022	Assam Rifles		
2023–2024	Gokulam Kerala	9	(1)
2024–2025	Assam Rifles		
2025–	Kickstart		

International career^{‡}
2014–2016	India U20		
2019–	India	50	(4)
- * Club domestic league appearances and goals as of 21 May 2023 ‡ National team caps and goals as of 11 October 2026

Ranjana Chanu Sorokhaibam (Meitei: Sorokhaibam Ranjana Chanu, born 10 March 1999) is an Indian professional footballer from Manipur. She plays as a defender for the India women's national football team and for Kickstart in the Indian Women's League.

== Early life ==
Her father was a rickshaw puller. She started playing football at school and made her junior national debut as a 15 year old. Her brother is also a football player. She started at her village club in 2009 and later shifted to Kryphsa FC, before getting selected for Assam Riffles.

== Career ==
Chanu made her junior national debut in 2015. Within three years, she made her senior national debut against Turkmenistan. In November 2021, she played for Gokulam Kerala FC which made its debut in the AFC Women's Club Championship. She has also participated at the 2022 AFC Women's Asian Cup. In December 2024, she played the friendlies against Maldives in Bengaluru.

== International career ==
Chanu made her Junior India debut in the 2015 AFC Under 19 Women's Championship qualifiers, at the age of 15 years. She scored her first goal on debut in the 10–0 win against Turkmenistan in the Turkish Women's Cup in 2018. She played for India again on 6 November 2019 against Vietnam in a friendly match in Hanoi where she scored the equalizer in the 1–1 draw.

== Career statistics ==
=== International ===
As of 11 October 2026

National team	Year	Caps	Goals
India	2019	15	3
India	2021	10	0
India	2022	4	0
India	2023	7	0
India	2024	7	1
India	2025	4	0
India	2026	3	0
Total		50	4

Scores and results list India's goal tally first.

List of international goals scored by Ranjana Chanu
No.	Date	Venue	Opponent	Score	Result	Competition
1.	1 March 2019	Alanya, Turkey	Turkmenistan	6–0	10–0	2019 Turkish Women's Cup
2.	1 March 2019	Alanya, Turkey	Turkmenistan	7–0	10–0	2019 Turkish Women's Cup
3.	6 November 2019	Vietnam Youth Football Training Centre, Hanoi, Vietnam	Vietnam	1–1	1–1	Friendly
4.	30 December 2024	Padukone – Dravid Centre for Sports Excellence, Bengaluru, India	Maldives	11–0	14–0	Friendly

== Honours ==
India

- SAFF Women's Championship: 2019, 2026
- South Asian Games Gold medal: 2019

Gokulam Kerala

- Indian Women's League: 2021–22, 2022–23
- AFC Women's Club Championship: third place 2021

KRYPHSA

- Indian Women's League runner-up: 2019–20
