= Kowsalya S. =

Indian footballer

Personal information
- Full name: Kowsalya Sivasami
- Date of birth: 19 August 2001 (age 25)
- Place of birth: Namakkal, Tamilnadu, India
- Position: Defender

Team information
- Current team: Sethu
- Number: 13

Senior career*
Years	Team	Apps	(Gls)
- Sethu
2022–2023	Lords FA		
2023–	Sethu		

International career^{‡}
- India U17
- * Club domestic league appearances and goals ‡ National team caps and goals as of 24 September 2023

Kowsalya Sivasami (born 19 August 2001) is an Indian professional footballer from Tamil Nadu, who plays as a defender for Sethu in the Indian Women's League. Earlier, she has played for Tamil Nadu Football Association Junior Women’ team and the Madurai district team.

== Early life ==
Kowsalya is from Namakkal in Tamil Nadu. She started playing football at the age of 12 at Loyola Higher Secondary School, Namakkal. He was encouraged by her brother Balamurugan and her family to play football.

== Club career ==
Kowsalya started playing football at the age of 12 years in her school with the senior team. She was part of the Junior India team that took part in the Under-18 AFC tournament. Playing for Sethu FC, she made her debut in the Chennai League at the age of 17 in 2019. Sethu FC defeated Manipur in the final to win the Indian Women's League in 2019. It was Kowsalya's first big success. She also represented Tamil Nadu in the 2023 Hero Senior Women's Football Championship at Punjab held in June.

== International career ==
She has represented the India U17 at the youth level.

== Honours ==
Sethu

- Indian Women's League: 2018–19

Tamil Nadu

- Rajmata Jijabai Trophy: 2022–23
