= MK Kashmina =

Indian football player

Personal information
- Date of birth: 3 March 1999 (age 27)
- Place of birth: Manipur, India
- Positions: Midfielder; forward

Team information
- Current team: Sribhumi
- Number: 27

Senior career*
Years	Team	Apps	(Gls)
- Eastern Sporting Union
- Kolhapur City
2020–	Gokulam Kerala		
2023–2024	Dinamo Zagreb	3	(0)
2024–2025	Kickstart		
2025	Odisha		
2025–	Sribhumi		

International career^{‡}
2014	India U16		
2017	India U20		
2017–	India	4	(1)
- * Club domestic league appearances and goals ‡ National team caps and goals as of 24 September 2023

MK Kashmina (born 3 March 1999) is an Indian professional footballer from Manipur, who will be playing as a midfielder for the Indian Women's League club Sribhumi and represents the India women's national football team.

== Early life ==
Her father, Mohammed Kashim Ali, was a university-level football player and encouraged young Kashmina to play the game. Her younger brother also played football as a goalkeeper.

== Domestic career ==
In 2012, her first big tournament was the Subroto Cup in Delhi representing Manipur. In 2017, she played for Eastern Sporting Union which defeated Rising Students to win the inaugural Indian Women's League on February 14. Later in 2022, she was selected to represent Manipur in the 36th National Games to be held in Gujarat from October 1 to 11. In 2023, she played for Gokulam Kerala in the IWL.

On 8 November 2023, it was officially announced that Kashmina along with Kiran Pisda joined Croatian Women's League club ŽNK Dinamo Zagreb on a one-year deal.

== International career ==
- 2017: AFC U19 Championship 2017 Qualifiers;
- 2018: She made her Senior India debut in the AFC Women's Asian Cup qualifiers against Uzbekistan;
- 2023: In March, she played two friendly matches in Jordan ahead of the Women's Olympic Football Tournament 2024 Asian Qualifiers Round 1 to be held in the Kyrgyz Republic.

== International goals ==
Scores and results list India's goal tally first.

No.	Date	Venue	Opponent	Score	Result	Competition
1.	10 September 2022	Dasharath Rangasala, Kathmandu, Nepal	Maldives	6–0	9–0	2022 SAFF Women's Championship

== Honours ==
Dinamo Zagreb

- Croatian Women's Football Cup: 2023–24
