= Sanjita Devi Thingbaijam =

Indian footballer

Sanjita Devi
Personal information
- Full name: Sanjita Devi Thingbaijam
- Date of birth: 10 September 2006 (age 20)
- Place of birth: Manipur, India
- Position: Defender

Team information
- Current team: Kickstart

Senior career*
Years	Team	Apps	(Gls)
- NYTHC
–2026	Garhwal United		
2026–	Kickstart		

International career^{‡}
2025	India U20	1	(0)
2025–	India	1	(0)
- * Club domestic league appearances and goals ‡ National team caps and goals as of 2 January 2025

Sanjita Devi Thingbaijam (Meitei: Thingbaijam Sanjita Devi, born 10 September 2006) is an Indian professional footballer from Manipur. She plays as a defender for the Indian Women's League club Kickstart and the India national football team.

== Early life and career ==
Devi is from Manipur.

Devi was selected in the 23-player Indian squad by Indian coach Joakim Alexandersson and she played the second of the two FIFA international friendlies against Maldives on January 2 at the Padukone-Dravid Centre for Sports Excellence in Bengaluru. She made her senior India debut in the second match against Maldives, off the bench.

In June 2022, she played for Manipur in the Hero Junior Under 17 Women's National Football Championship at Indira Gandhi Athletic Stadium, Guwahati. In the Group A opener, she scored a goal in the 73rd minute in the 14–0 victory. In the next match against Andhra Pradesh, she scored three goals in the 17–0 win. She also scored against Uttarakhand in the other Group A match which Manipur won 14–0.

== Career statistics ==
=== International ===
As of 2 January 2025

National team	Year	Caps	Goals
India	2025	1	0
Total		1	0
