= Panthoi Chanu Elangbam =

Indian footballer

Panthoi Chanu
Personal information
- Full name: Panthoi Chanu Elangbam
- Date of birth: 1 February 1996 (age 30)
- Place of birth: Keirak, Thoubal, Manipur, India
- Height: 1.73 m (5 ft 8 in)
- Position: Goalkeeper

Team information
- Current team: East Bengal
- Number: 1

Youth career
- 2008–2012: Kakching WFA

Senior career*
Years	Team	Apps	(Gls)
2012–2019	Eastern Sporting Union		
2019–2022	Manipur Police		
2022–2024	Eastern Sporting Union		
2024	Metro United	14	(0)
2024–	East Bengal	20	(0)

International career^{‡}
2010–2011	India U16	2	(0)
2012–2015	India U19	8	(0)
2014–	India	32	(0)
- * Club domestic league appearances and goals as of 6 April 2024 ‡ National team caps and goals as of 6 June 2026

Panthoi Chanu Elangbam (Meitei: Elangbam Panthoi Chanu, born 1 February 1996) is an Indian professional footballer who plays as a goalkeeper for the Indian Women's League club East Bengal and India women's football team. In March 2024, she played the South Australia Women's National Premier Leagues for Metro United WFC to become the first woman from India to play the Australian Football League.

== Early life ==
Chanu is from Keirak village, Kakching district, Manipur. She is the daughter of Elangbam Chinglenkhomba and Elangbam Ongbi Shanti Leima of Keirak Makha Leikai.

She started playing football at the local club, Women Football Academy Kakching. In 2012, she moved to Eastern Sporting Union. She played for Union and Manipur Police in the Indian Women's League and the regional Manipur Women's League. During her early days, she used to travel for 50 km everyday to the Imphal Academy to learn the game.

== Career ==
Chanu first represented the Indian team in 2008 when she played for India under 13 team. Later, she played all age groups, representing India in the under 14, under 16 and under 19 teams.

In December 2022, she along with Bala Devi, moved to Spain where they underwent training cum trial stint at the Spanish Segunda Federación outfit Málaga.

In 2024, she signed a contract with the second tier National Premier Leagues Women's club Metro United WFC in the South Australian league, becoming the first Indian footballer to play professional football in Australia. She was spotted by head coach Paul Morris at the Women in Sports Elite Football Trials in October 2023 and later trained at the A-League club, Adelaide United FC.

In 2025, she was part of the Indian team that participated in the AFC Women's Asian Cup Qualifier 2026 at Chiang Mai, Thailand. After her return, she was felicitated at a function in her village Keirak.

=== Domestic ===
In the Hero Women's National Football Championship, she played for Manipur Police and Manipur.

== Career statistics ==
=== International ===
As of 6 June 2026

National team	Year	Caps	Goals
India	2014	1	0
India	2015	0	0
India	2016	0	0
India	2017	5	0
India	2018	0	0
India	2019	1	0
India	2021	0	0
India	2022	0	0
India	2023	4	0
India	2024	7	0
India	2025	8	0
India	2026	6	0
Total		32	0

== Honours ==
India

- SAFF Women's Championship: 2014, 2016, 2026
- South Asian Games Gold medal: 2016, 2019

East Bengal

- SAFF Women's Club Championship: 2025
- Indian Women's League: 2024–25, 2025–26

Eastern Sporting Union

- Indian Women's League: 2016–17

Manipur

- Rajmata Jijabai Trophy: 2019–20

Individual

- Indian Women's League Best Goalkeeper: 2017–18

== Awards ==
- She bagged the Women's goalkeeper of the year award by AIFF for 2024 season. She played for East Bengal.

== See also ==
- List of Indian expatriate footballers
