= Irom =

Irom is a Meitei family name. Notable people with this surname are:

- Irom Chanu Sharmila, Indian civil rights activist, political activist, and poet
- Irom Seityasen Singh, Indian professional footballer
- Irom Prameshwori Devi, Indian footballer
- Irom Maipak, Indian cinematographer
