= KRYPHSA FC =

- Full name: Kangchup Road Young Physical and Sports Association
- Founded: 1964; 61 years ago
- President: Nabachandra Singh
- League: Manipur Women's League
Home colours	Away colours

KRYPHSA Football Club is an Indian women's football club based in Imphal, Manipur, that competed in the Indian Women's League.

== History ==
In 1964, residents of Naoremthong, a locality on the outskirts of Imphal, decided that they needed a club to give exposure for local football talents. Kangchup Road Young Physical and Sports Association was born and along with it, the hopes and dreams of Naoremthong. KRYPHSA is crowd–funded community club. Funds collected from the 3,500 households in the Naoremthong area are used as base for club income, while tambola games, which are held twice a year and are very popular in the Imphal area, also contribute a sizeable amount to the club.

=== Indian Women's League ===
KRYPHSA participated in the preliminary round of inaugural season of Indian Women's League. The club finished third in group stage, behind fellow Imphal Eastern Sporting Union and Jeppiaar Institute, failing to qualify to next round. Though club got invitation from AIFF to participate in the final round later, it decided not to participate due to financial problems.

In 2017–18 season, KRYPHSA finished the preliminary round second, behind Eastern Sporting Union and played in the final round. KRYPHSA entered semifinal finishing top of the group. In semifinal, KRYPHSA lost to Rising Student Club in a penalty shootout.

== Team records ==
=== Seasons ===
Year	League								Top scorer(s)	
Year	P	W	D	L	GF	GA	Pts	Pos.	Player(s)	Goals
2016–17	3	1	0	2	8	7	—	PR	(India) Dangmei Grace	4
2017–18	7	4	3	0	24	3	—	Semifinal	(India) Bala Devi	12

PR: Preliminary round.

== Current squad ==
As of 12 May 2020:

Note: Flags indicate national team as defined under FIFA eligibility rules; some limited exceptions apply. Players may hold more than one non-FIFA nationality.

No.	Pos.	Nation	Player
1	GK	(India) IND	Maibam Linthoingambi Devi
3	DF	(India) IND	Wangkhem Linthoingambi Devi
4	DF	(India) IND	Yumlembam Pakpi Devi
5	DF	(India) IND	Laishram Devi
6	MF	(India) IND	Yumnam Chandrajini Devi
8	DF	(India) IND	Babysana Devi

No.	Pos.	Nation	Player
9	FW	(India) IND	Roja Devi
12	FW	(India) IND	Chandrajini Devi
15	DF	(India) IND	Shanglakpam Sharma
16	DF	(India) IND	K. Anita Devi
17	FW	(India) IND	Thangjam Chanu
18	DF	(India) IND	Roshni Devi
1	GK	(India) IND	Sarungbam Anika Chanu
19	GK	(India) IND	Naorem Khushi Chanu

== Technical staff ==
As of 7 April 2018

Position	Name
Head coach	(India) L. Chaoba Devi
Assistant coach	(India) RK JANAKIBALA DEVI
Assistant coach	(India) KHELEMBA NGANGOMCHA
Goalkeeping coach	(India) KEISHAM NARAYAN SINGH
Physiotherapist	(India) TONGBRAM GALAXY DEVI
Team manager	(India) TH BIPINCHANDRA

== Honours ==
- Indian Women's League
  - Runners-up (1): 2019–20
- Manipur Women's League
  - Champions (2): 2016, 2019
