= Radharani Devi Gurumayum =

Indian footballer

Radharani Devi
Personal information
- Full name: Radharani Devi Gurumayum
- Date of birth: 1 March 1991 (age 35)
- Place of birth: Imphal, Manipur, India
- Position: Defender

Team information
- Current team: Eastern Sporting Union
- Number: 2

Senior career*
Years	Team	Apps	(Gls)
- Manipur Police
- Eastern Sporting Union

International career^{‡}
2013–2014	India	8	(0)
- * Club domestic league appearances and goals ‡ National team caps and goals as of 11 April 2017

Radharani Devi Gurumayum (Meitei: Gurumayum Radharani Devi, born 1 March 1991) is an Indian footballer who plays as a defender for Eastern Sporting Union. She also played for the India national football team.

== Honours ==
India

- SAFF Women's Championship: 2014, 2016
- South Asian Games Gold medal: 2016

Eastern Sporting Union

- Indian Women's League: 2016–17
