= Sumithra Kamaraj =

Indian footballer

Personal information
- Date of birth: 5 July 1994 (age 32)
- Place of birth: Puliyankudi, Tamil Nadu, India
- Position: Midfielder

Senior career*
Years	Team	Apps	(Gls)
2016–2017	Jeppiaar Institute		
2017–2018	Indira Gandhi AS&E		
2018–2022	Sethu		
2022–2023	Lord FA Kochi		
2023–2024	Liberty Ladies FC		
2024–2025	Pudhuvai Unicorns FC	2	(0)

International career
2016–2022	India	9	(2)

Managerial career
- 2024–2025: Pudhuvai Unicorns (assistant)
- 2025–: Liberty Ladies FC
- * Club domestic league appearances and goals

Sumithra Kamaraj (born 5 July 1994) is an Indian professional footballer and football coach from Tamil Nadu, who plays as a midfielder. She also serves as the head coach of the Liberty Ladies FC which plays in the Indian Women's League 2. She has also represented Sethu in the Indian Women's League and represented the India women's national football team for the 2020 AFC Women's Olympic Qualifying Tournament.

== Early life ==
Sumithra along with her friend Sandhiya Ranganathan grew up in an orphanage in Tamil Nadu where she fell in love with football. She did her studies at St. Joseph's College of Arts and Sciences, Cuddalore. Later, both played for India. She lives in Cuddalore.

== Football career ==
In her Class 8, she was selected for the Indian Under-14 team. In 2016–17, Sumithra played for the Jeppier Institute of Technology FC in the inaugural IWL. In 2018, she Joined Sethu FC. In 2019, she played the South Asian Games at Kathmandu where India bagged the gold medal. In April 2022, she toured Jordan as part of the Indian team to play two matches against Egypt and Jordan.

== International goals ==
Scores and results list India's goal tally first.

No.	Date	Venue	Opponent	Score	Result	Competition
1.	21 January 2019	Hong Kong	Hong Kong	4–2	5–2	Friendly
2.	1 March 2019	Alanya, Turkey	Turkmenistan	8–0	10–0	2019 Turkish Women's Cup

== Honours ==
India

- SAFF Women's Championship: 2016, 2019
- South Asian Games Gold medal: 2019
