= Umapati Devi Thokchom =

Indian footballer (born 1994)

Umapati Devi
Personal information
- Full name: Umapati Devi Thokchom
- Date of birth: 10 March 1994 (age 32)
- Place of birth: Imphal, Manipur, India
- Position: Defender

Team information
- Current team: Eastern Sporting Union

Senior career*
Years	Team	Apps	(Gls)
- Eastern Sporting Union
- Manipur Police
- Gokulam Kerala
- Eastern Sporting Union

International career^{‡}
2014–2017	India	9	(1)
- * Club domestic league appearances and goals ‡ National team caps and goals as of 11 April 2017

Umapati Devi Thokchom (Meitei: Thokchom Umapati Devi, born 10 March 1994) is an Indian footballer who plays as a defender for Eastern Sporting Union. She has been a member of the India women's national team.

== Honours ==
India

- SAFF Women's Championship: 2014, 2016
- South Asian Games Gold medal: 2016

Eastern Sporting Union

- Indian Women's League: 2016–17

Gokulam Kerala

- Indian Women's League: 2019–20

Manipur

- Rajmata Jijabai Trophy: 2019–20

Individual

- Indian Women's League Most Valuable Player: 2016–17
