= Premi Devi Yumlembam =

Indian footballer

Premi Devi
Personal information
- Full name: Premi Devi Yumlembam
- Date of birth: 6 December 1993 (age 32)
- Place of birth: Manipur, India
- Position: Midfielder

Senior career*
Years	Team	Apps	(Gls)
- Manipur
2015	Eastern Sporting Union	8	(4)

International career
2008	India U16	3	(1)
2010	India U19	3	(0)
2011–	India	16	(2)
- * Club domestic league appearances and goals

Premi Devi Yumlembam (Meitei: Yumlembam Premi Devi, born 6 December 1993) is an Indian women's international footballer who plays as a midfielder. She has played internationals for the India women's national football team, and at a club level she has played for Manipur and Eastern Sporting Union.

== International career ==
She made her debut in the friendly series against Bahrain in 2011. She was part of the team at the 2014 Asian Games and at the 2015–16 AFC Women's Olympic Qualifying Tournament.

== Honours ==
India

- SAFF Women's Championship: 2012, 2014, 2016
- South Asian Games Gold medal: 2016

Eastern Sporting Union

- Indian Women's League: 2016–17

Railways

- Rajmata Jijabai Trophy: 2015–16
