= Namita Dali =

Nepalese footballer

Personal information
- Full name: Namita Kumari Dali
- Date of birth: 16 June 1991 (age 35)
- Place of birth: Chandranigahapur, Nepal
- Height: 5 ft 5 in (1.65 m)
- Position: Goalkeeper

Senior career*
Years	Team	Apps	(Gls)
- Nepal Police Club

International career
2012–	Nepal		
- * Club domestic league appearances and goals

Namita Kumari Dali (Nepali: नमिता दली) (born 16 June 1991, in Chandranigahapur) is a Nepalese women's footballer who plays for the Nepal Police Club and the national team. She represented Nepal at the 2012 SAFF Women's Championship, playing in the final against India.

Dali also played in the 2014 SAFF Women's Championship, coming on as a 44th-minute substitute in a 6–0 loss to India. Dali was selected for Nepal's team in the 2016 SAFF Women's Championship.
