= Mandakini Devi Moirangthem =

Indian footballer

Mandakini Devi
Personal information
- Full name: Mandakini Devi Moirangthem
- Date of birth: 1 March 1991 (age 35)
- Place of birth: Thoubal, Manipur, India
- Position: Midfielder

Senior career*
Years	Team	Apps	(Gls)
- Manipur Police
- Eastern Sporting Union

International career
2010–2014	India	?	(7)
- * Club domestic league appearances and goals

Mandakini Devi Moirangthem (Meitei: Moirangthem Mandakini Devi, born 1 March 1991) is an Indian football coach and former footballer who played as a midfielder for the India women's national team.

== Career ==
She represented the Eastern Sporting Union in the national and state leagues.

In 2025, she was appointed the assistant coach of the Manipur women's football team.

== International goals ==
No.	Date	Venue	Opponent	Score	Result	Competition
1.	29 January 2010	Bangabandhu National Stadium, Dhaka, Bangladesh	Sri Lanka	1–?	8–1	2010 South Asian Games
2.	29 January 2010	Bangabandhu National Stadium, Dhaka, Bangladesh	Sri Lanka	4–?	8–1	2010 South Asian Games
3.	29 January 2010	Bangabandhu National Stadium, Dhaka, Bangladesh	Sri Lanka	5–?	8–1	2010 South Asian Games
4.	6 February 2010	Bangabandhu National Stadium, Dhaka, Bangladesh	Bangladesh	?–?	7–0	2010 South Asian Games
5.	6 February 2010	Bangabandhu National Stadium, Dhaka, Bangladesh	Bangladesh	?–?	7–0	2010 South Asian Games
6.	15 November 2014	Jinnah Sports Stadium, Islamabad, Pakistan	Bangladesh	2–0	5–1	2014 SAFF Women's Championship
7.	17 November 2014	Jinnah Sports Stadium, Islamabad, Pakistan	Afghanistan	12–0	12–0	2014 SAFF Women's Championship

== Honours ==
India

- SAFF Women's Championship: 2014
- South Asian Games Gold medal: 2010

Eastern Sporting Union

- Indian Women's League: 2016–17

Manipur

- Rajmata Jijabai Trophy: 2019–20, 2021–22
