= Jabamani Tudu =

Indian footballer

Personal information
- Full name: Jabamani Tudu
- Date of birth: 10 April 2000 (age 26)
- Place of birth: Mayardar, Mayurbhanj, Odisha
- Position: Defender

Team information
- Current team: Nita
- Number: 2

Youth career
- Odisha Sports Hostel

Senior career*
Years	Team	Apps	(Gls)
- Odisha Sports Hostel
2016–2019	Rising Student's Club	17	(8)
2019	FC Kolhapur City		
2020–2021	Sethu		
2022	Odisha Police		
2022	Sports Odisha	8	(1)
2022–2023	East Coast Railway		
2023–2024	Kickstart		
2024–	Nita		

International career
2014	India U16		
2018	India U17	4	(1)
2018	India U19	3	(1)
2017–	India	26	(1)
- * Club domestic league appearances and goals

Jabamani Tudu (born 10 April 2000) is an Indian professional footballer who plays as a defender for the Indian Women's League club Nita and the India women's national football team.

== Early life ==
Born in Mayurbhanj district, Odisha, Tudu was a part of the Odisha Sports Hostel. She has played in youth and senior football tournaments. She has also played for Odisha in national competitions, both youth and senior.

== International career ==
Tudu represented India at the under-16 level during the 2015 AFC U-16 Championship qualifiers. In December 2016 Tudu was selected into the Indian senior side for the 2016 SAFF Women's Championship. She made her debut for the side on 2 January 2017 in their semi-final match against Nepal. She came on as a substitute for Dalima Chhibber as India won 3–1. She made her debut as a 15-year-old.

== International goals ==
Scores and results list India's goal tally first.

No.	Date	Venue	Opponent	Score	Result	Competition
1.	3 December 2019	Pokhara Rangasala, Pokhara, Nepal	Maldives	5–0	5–0	2019 South Asian Games

== Honours ==
India

- SAFF Women's Championship: 2016, 2019
- South Asian Games Gold medal: 2019

Rising Students Club

- Indian Women's League: 2017–18

Odisha

- National Games Silver medal: 2022

Individual

- Indian Women's League Emerging Player: 2016–17
