= 2018–19 Indian Women's League =

Indian Women's League
- Season: 2018–19
- Champions: Sethu (1st title)
- Matches: 33
- Goals: 156 (4.73 per match)
- Best player: Sandhiya Ranganathan
- Top goalscorer: Bala Devi (26 goals)
- Best goalkeeper: Linthoingambi Devi
- Highest scoring: Manipur Police 4–6 Sethu; SAI-STC Cuttack 0–10 Manipur Police; Manipur Police 10–0 Bangalore United

The 2018–19 Indian Women's League (also known as Hero Indian Women's League for sponsorship reasons) was the third season of the Indian Women's League, a women's football league in India. The league started on 5 May 2019 and twelve teams participated. All the matches were played at the Guru Nanak Stadium, Ludhiana.

== Qualifiers ==
State women's leagues organised by various state federations acted as qualifier for this season, as the champions of the leagues have been awarded a place in the final round.

== Teams ==
Locations of the 2018-19 Indian Women's League teams

=== Team locations ===
| Group A | State/UT | Group B | State/UT |
|---|---|---|---|
| Rising Students Club | Cuttack, Odisha | Manipur Police | Imphal, Manipur |
| Gokulam Kerala | Kozhikode, Kerala | Sethu | Madurai, Tamil Nadu |
| SSB Women | Kolkata, West Bengal | Kolhapur City | Kolhapur, Maharashtra |
| FC Alakhpura | Alakhpura, Haryana | Baroda FA | Baroda, Gujarat |
| Hans Women FC | Delhi | Bangalore United FC | Bengaluru, Karnataka |
| Panjim Footballers | Panaji, Goa | SAI-STC Cuttack | Cuttack, Odisha |

=== Personnel ===
| Team | Head coach | Captain |
|---|---|---|
| Alakhpura | (India) Sanjay Singh | (India) Ritu Rani |
| Bangalore United | (India) Chitra Gangadharan | (India) Amoolya Kamal |
| Baroda FA | (India) Lalita Saini | (India) Tarannum Shaikh |
| Gokulam Kerala | (India) Priya P. V. | (India) Dalima Chhibber |
| Hans Women | (India) Paritosh Sharma | (India) Jyoti Ann Burrett |
| Kolhapur City | (India) Gitanjali Khuntia | (India) Mrunal Khot |
| Manipur Police | (India) Mutum Surmala Chanu | (India) Bala Devi |
| Panjim Footballers | (India) Naresh Virnodkar | (India) Linda Calado |
| Rising Students Club | (India) Sukhwinder Kumar | (India) Prerna Mishra |
| SAI-STC Cuttack | (India) Shyam Lodh | (India) Arati Baral |
| SSB Women | (India) Barun Sengupta | (India) Sumitra Marandi |
| Sethu | (India) Amrutha Arvind | (India) Indumathi Kathiresan |

== Foreign players ==
| Club | Player 1 | Player 2 |
|---|---|---|
| Alakhpura | — | — |
| Bangalore United | (England) Tanvie Hans | — |
| Baroda FA | — | — |
| Hans Women | (Nigeria) Uchenna Ritacascia Ukachukwu | — |
| Gokulam Kerala | — | — |
| Kolhapur City | (Nigeria) Ayomide Awawu Anibaba | (Nigeria) Crystal Nnenna Eke |
| Manipur Police | — | — |
| Panjim Footballers | — | — |
| Rising Students Club | — | — |
| SAI-STC Cuttack | — | — |
| SSB Women | — | — |
| Sethu | (Nepal) Sabitra Bhandari | (Nepal) Anita Basnet |

== Final round ==
=== Group stage ===
==== Cluster I ====
| Pos | Team | Pld | W | D | L | GF | GA | GD | Pts | Qualification |
|---|---|---|---|---|---|---|---|---|---|---|
| 1 | Gokulam Kerala | 5 | 5 | 0 | 0 | 16 | 1 | +15 | 15 | Semi Final |
| 2 | Central SSB Women | 5 | 4 | 0 | 1 | 10 | 7 | +3 | 12 | Semi Final |
| 3 | Hans Women FC | 5 | 2 | 0 | 3 | 6 | 9 | −3 | 6 | |
| 4 | Panjim Footballers | 5 | 1 | 1 | 3 | 7 | 13 | −6 | 4 | |
| 5 | Rising Student's Club | 5 | 1 | 1 | 3 | 4 | 10 | −6 | 4 | |
| 6 | FC Alakhpura | 5 | 1 | 0 | 4 | 3 | 6 | −3 | 3 | |

Source: AIFF
Rules for classification: 1) points; 2) head-to-head points; 3) head-to-head goal difference; 4) goal difference; 5) number of goals scored; 6) drawing of lots

==== Cluster II ====
| Pos | Team | Pld | W | D | L | GF | GA | GD | Pts | Qualification |
|---|---|---|---|---|---|---|---|---|---|---|
| 1 | Sethu | 5 | 5 | 0 | 0 | 34 | 4 | +30 | 15 | Semi Final |
| 2 | Manipur Police | 5 | 4 | 0 | 1 | 37 | 8 | +29 | 12 | Semi Final |
| 3 | FC Kolhapur City | 5 | 2 | 1 | 2 | 8 | 20 | −12 | 7 | |
| 4 | SAI-STC Cuttack | 5 | 2 | 0 | 3 | 5 | 21 | −16 | 6 | |
| 5 | Bangalore United FC | 5 | 1 | 1 | 3 | 3 | 15 | −12 | 4 | |
| 6 | Baroda Football Academy | 5 | 0 | 0 | 5 | 4 | 23 | −19 | 0 | |

Source: AIFF
Rules for classification: 1) points; 2) head-to-head points; 3) head-to-head goal difference; 4) goal difference; 5) number of goals scored; 6) drawing of lots

=== Knock–out stage ===
Semi-finals
20 May 2019 – Guru Nanak Stadium, Ludhiana
Gokulam Kerala | 2
Manipur Police | 4
20 May 2019 – Guru Nanak Stadium, Ludhiana
Sethu | 8
SSB Women | 1

Final
22 May 2019 – Guru Nanak Stadium, Ludhiana
Manipur Police | 1
Sethu | 3

== Season awards ==
The awards for the Hero Indian Women's League 2018–19 season:

| Award | Recipient |
|---|---|
| Top Scorer | Bala Devi (Manipur Police) |
| Best Goalkeeper | Maibam Linthoingambi Devi (Gokulam Kerala) |
| Most Valuable Player | Sandhiya Ranganathan (Sethu) |
| Emerging Player | Nongmaithem Ratanbala Devi (Sethu) |
