= Sanju Yadav =

Indian footballer

Personal information
- Full name: Sanju Yadav
- Date of birth: 12 September 1997 (age 29)
- Place of birth: Alakhpura, Haryana, India
- Height: 1.64 m (5 ft 5 in)
- Position: Forward

Team information
- Current team: Sribhumi
- Number: 8

Senior career*
Years	Team	Apps	(Gls)
2016–2017	Alakhpura FC	10	(15)
2017–2018	Rising Student's Club	8	(3)
2019–2021	Gokulam Kerala		
2022	Sethu		
2023–2024	Odisha		
2024–2025	Kickstart		
2025–	Sribhumi		

International career^{‡}
2014–2015	India U19	3	(0)
2016–	India	65	(11)
Medal record
South Asian Games
Gold medal – first place	2016 India	Team
- * Club domestic league appearances and goals as of 16 May 2019 ‡ National team caps and goals as of 10 March 2026

Sanju Yadav (born 12 September 1997) is an Indian professional footballer who plays as a forward for the Indian Women's League club Sribhumi and the India women's national football team.

== Early life ==
Born in the village of Alakhpura, Yadav began playing football at the age of ten in order to gain scholarships and money for her family. She mainly trains with her village players and the India national team.

== Domestic career ==
In October 2016, Sanju was part of the Alakhpura side that took part in the preliminary round of the Indian Women's League. On 17 October 2016, she scored a hattrick for the club against Bodyline. This helped her side win 4–0. She emerged the top scorer at the league's preliminary round, netting 11 goals and thus helping her team qualify for the tournament's final round. At the final round of the women's league she helped her team qualify in the semi finale by scoring three goals.

On 21 December 2016, after her performances for both her club and country, Yadav was named the AIFF Emerging Player of the Year.

She then joined Rising Student's Club for the 2017-18 Indian Women's League and scored 2 goals for the club in the Final Round. In 2019 she joined Gokulam Kerala FC.

== International career ==
In February 2016, Yadav was selected as a member of the 20-woman India squad that would participate in the 2016 South Asian Games. She made her debut and scored her first goal internationally on 13 February 2016 against Bangladesh. Her goal in the 74th minute was the fourth as India won 5–1 and moved into the gold medal match. Two days later she came on as a substitute in the 69th minute as India won the tournament, defeating Nepal 4–0 at the Jawaharlal Nehru Stadium in Shillong.

== Career statistics ==
=== International ===
As of 10 March 2026

National team	Year	Caps	Goals
India	2016	6	2
India	2017	2	1
India	2018	3	0
India	2019	22	8
India	2021	6	0
India	2022	2	0
India	2023	4	0
India	2024	10	0
India	2025	7	0
India	2026	3	0
Total		65	11

Scores and results list India's goal tally first.

List of international goals scored by Sanju Yadav
No.	Date	Venue	Opponent	Score	Result	Competition
1.	13 February 2016	Jawaharlal Nehru Stadium, Shillong, India	Bangladesh	4–1	5–1	2016 South Asian Games
2.	27 December 2016	Kanchenjunga Stadium, Siliguri, India	Afghanistan	5–1	5–1	2016 SAFF Women's Championship
3.	11 November 2018	Thuwunna Stadium, Yangon, Myanmar	Bangladesh	6–0	7–1	2020 Olympic Qualifiers
4.	21 January 2019	Hong Kong	Hong Kong	3–1	5–2	Friendly
5.	30 January 2019	Benteng Taruna Stadium, Tangerang, Indonesia	Indonesia	1–0	2–0	Friendly
6.	1 March 2019	Alanya, Turkey	Turkmenistan	2–0	10–0	2019 Turkish Women's Cup
7.	1 March 2019	Alanya, Turkey	Turkmenistan	3–0	10–0	2019 Turkish Women's Cup
8.	1 March 2019	Alanya, Turkey	Turkmenistan	7–0	10–0	2019 Turkish Women's Cup
9.	13 March 2019	Sahid Rangasala, Biratnagar, Nepal	Maldives	4–0	6–0	2019 SAFF Women's Championship
10.	13 March 2019	Sahid Rangasala, Biratnagar, Nepal	Maldives	6–0	6–0	2019 SAFF Women's Championship
11.	9 April 2019	Mandalar Thiri Stadium, Mandalay, Myanmar	Myanmar	2–2	3–3	2020 Olympic Qualifiers

== Honours ==
India

- SAFF Women's Championship: 2016, 2019
- South Asian Games Gold medal: 2016

Odisha

- Indian Women's League: 2023–24

Rising Students Club

- Indian Women's League: 2017–18

Individual

- AIFF Women's Emerging Player of the Year: 2016
