= FC Pune City (women) =

Pune City Women
- Full name: Football Club Pune City
- Nickname: The Stallions
- Founded: 2017
- Dissolved: 2018; 8 years ago
- Owner: Wadhawan Group; Hrithik Roshan
- League: Indian Women's League
- 2016–17: Semi-finals

Departments of FC Pune City (2014–2019)
Football (Men's)	Football (Women's)	Football Reserves (Men's)

Football Club Pune City Women was an Indian women's football club based in Pune, Maharashtra, which last played in Indian Women's League, the top flight of Indian women's football. The club was established 2017, prior to the league's inaugural season.

== History ==
In April 2016 it was announced by the All India Football Federation (AIFF) president, Praful Patel, that an Indian women's football league would begin in October 2016. Then, in July 2016, the AIFF hosted a workshop program for the proposed women's league at which Pune City, an Indian Super League side, were present. Finally, in October 2016, it was revealed that the Indian Women's League would kick off with a preliminary round on 17 October in which the top two teams during that round would qualify for a place in the league. Pune City were not part of this round.

A few months later, on 12 January 2017, the team announced that they would be fielding a side in the league proper, which would begin on 23 January.

== Ownership ==
The women's team, like the men's side, was owned by a consortium which consists of the Wadhawan Group and Bollywood actor Arjun Kapoor.

== Statistics and records ==
=== Season-by-season ===
As of 14 March 2017

Season	Indian Women's League								Finals
Season	P	W	D	L	GF	GA	Pts	Position	Finals
2016–17	6	2	1	3	6	10	0	Semi Final	Did not qualify

== Honours ==
- WIFA Women's Football League
  - Champions (1): 2017

== See also ==
- Indian Women's League
- FC Pune City
- FC Pune City Youth
