= Dalima Chhibber =

Indian footballer

Personal information
- Full name: Dalima Chhibber
- Date of birth: 30 August 1997 (age 29)
- Place of birth: Delhi, India
- Height: 1.65 m (5 ft 5 in)
- Position: Right back

Youth career
- 2004: Eves Soccer Club

College career
Years	Team	Apps	(Gls)
2019–2023	Manitoba Bisons	26	(1)

Senior career*
Years	Team	Apps	(Gls)
2017	Pune City	6	(2)
2018	India Rush SC	6	(0)
2019–2022	Gokulam Kerala	16	(1)
2023–2025	Kickstart	21	(0)
2025–2026	Gokulam Kerala	4	(0)

International career^{‡}
2011–2012	India U14	4	(9)
2012–2013	India U17	3	(0)
2014–2015	India U19	3	(0)
2016–2024	India	54	(2)
- * Club domestic league appearances and goals as of 12 May 2026 ‡ National team caps and goals as of 23 October 2024

Dalima Chhibber (born 30 August 1997) is an Indian professional footballer who played as a defender for the Indian national team.

== Early and personal life ==
Dalima was born in a football-loving family, as both of her parents were soccer players, and her dad made it pro, as did her sister and her brother. She joined her father Om Chhibber's football academy Eves Soccer Club at the age of 7 and eventually went on to play for the Indian women's youth teams. She did her graduation from the Jesus and Mary College of the Delhi University. She is pursuing her master's degree in Sports Psychology at the University of Manitoba where she is also a part of the women's soccer team of Manitoba Bisons. She completed her graduation in November 2022.

In 2019, she became brand ambassador of sports equipments manufacturer Vector X.

== Club career ==
Dalima played for FC Pune City in 2016-17 Indian Women's League season and then moved to India Rush SC for the 2017–18 Indian Women's League season. She joined Gokulam Kerala FC on 31 March 2019 for the 2019–20 Indian Women's League season.

On 14 August 2019, Dalima joined Manitoba Bisons in Canadian West Universities Premier Division. After two-year long stint and experience with Gokulam Kerala, Chhibber moved back to Canadian side Manitoba Bisons in August 2022.

After spell in Manitoba Bisons, Chhibber returned to India in 2023, signed with Kickstart for 2023–24 IWL season, and became club captain.

== International career ==
Dalima made her international debut in 2016 South Asian games against Maldives. After that she became a regular choice for the national team. She scored her first goal in 2019 SAFF Women's Championship against Bangladesh on 20 March 2019. Her second goal came against Nepal, a 40-yard freekick in the final of the SAFF Championship. For her prolific performance in 2019 SAFF Women's Championship she was awarded the Most Valuable Player of the Tournament Award.

== Career statistics ==
=== International ===
As of 23 October 2024

National team	Year	Caps	Goals
India	2016	3	0
India	2017	7	0
India	2018	3	0
India	2019	18	2
India	2021	6	0
India	2022	2	0
India	2023	10	0
India	2024	5	0
Total		54	2

Scores and results list India's goal tally first.

List of international goals scored by Dalima Chhibber
No.	Date	Venue	Opponent	Score	Result	Competition
1.	20 March 2019	Sahid Rangsala, Biratnagar, Nepal	Bangladesh	1–0	4–0	2019 SAFF Women's Championship
2.	22 March 2019	Sahid Rangsala, Biratnagar, Nepal	Nepal	1–0	3–1	2019 SAFF Women's Championship

== Honours ==
India

- SAFF Women's Championship: 2016, 2019
- South Asian Games Gold Medal: 2016

Gokulam Kerala

- Indian Women's League: 2021–22
- AFC Women's Club Championship: third place 2021

Kickstart

- Indian Women's League runner-up: 2022–23

Individual

- 2019 SAFF Women's Championship Most Valuable Player

== See also ==
- List of Indian football players in foreign leagues
