= Prameshwori Devi Irom =

Indian footballer

Prameshwori Devi
Personal information
- Full name: Prameshwori Devi Irom
- Date of birth: 1 May 1989 (age 37)
- Place of birth: Imphal, Manipur, India
- Position: Forward

Team information
- Current team: Sethu
- Number: 19

Senior career*
Years	Team	Apps	(Gls)
- Eastern Sporting Union
- Manipur Police
- Gokulam Kerala
2022	Kickstart	10	(4)
2023	Eastern Sporting Union		
2023–	East Bengal		
2024–	Sethu		

International career^{‡}
2011–2016	India	?	(12)
- * Club domestic league appearances and goals ‡ National team caps and goals as of 21 November 2014

Prameshwori Devi Irom (Meitei: Irom Prameshwori Devi, born 1 May 1989) is an Indian professional footballer who plays as a forward for Sethu. She also formerly represented the India women's national team.

== Honours ==
India

- SAFF Women's Championship: 2012, 2014, 2016
- South Asian Games Gold medal: 2016

Eastern Sporting Union

- Indian Women's League: 2016–17

Gokulam Kerala

- Indian Women's League: 2019–20

Railways

- Rajmata Jijabai Trophy: 2015–16

Manipur

- Rajmata Jijabai Trophy: 2013–14, 2019–20, 2021–22, 2023–24
- National Games Gold medal: 2022

Individual

- Indian Women's League Most Valuable Player: 2017–18

== International goals ==
No.	Date	Venue	Opponent	Score	Result	Competition
1.	23 September 2011	Bahrain National Stadium, Manama, Bahrain	Bahrain	3–1	3–1	Friendly
2.	9 September 2012	CR & FC Grounds, Colombo, Sri Lanka	Sri Lanka	5–0	5–0	2012 SAFF Women's Championship
3.	11 September 2012	CR & FC Grounds, Colombo, Sri Lanka	Bhutan	6–0	11–0	2012 SAFF Women's Championship
4.	11 September 2012	CR & FC Grounds, Colombo, Sri Lanka	Bhutan	9–0	11–0	2012 SAFF Women's Championship
5.	14 September 2012	CR & FC Grounds, Colombo, Sri Lanka	Afghanistan	2–0	11–0	2012 SAFF Women's Championship
6.	16 May 2013	Bahrain National Stadium, Manama, Bahrain	Bahrain	1–0	2–0	Friendly
7.	15 September 2014	Incheon Namdong Asiad Rugby Field, Incheon, South Korea	Maldives	15–0	15–0	2014 Asian Games
8.	17 November 2014	Jinnah Sports Stadium, Islamabad, Pakistan	Afghanistan	5–0	12–0	2014 SAFF Women's Championship
9.	17 November 2014	Jinnah Sports Stadium, Islamabad, Pakistan	Afghanistan	8–0	12–0	2014 SAFF Women's Championship
10.	17 November 2014	Jinnah Sports Stadium, Islamabad, Pakistan	Afghanistan	10–0	12–0	2014 SAFF Women's Championship
11.	19 November 2014	Jinnah Sports Stadium, Islamabad, Pakistan	Sri Lanka	3–0	5–0	2014 SAFF Women's Championship
12.	21 November 2014	Jinnah Sports Stadium, Islamabad, Pakistan	Nepal	4–0	6–0	2014 SAFF Women's Championship
