= Yumnam Kamala Devi =

Indian footballer (born 1992)

Kamala Devi
Personal information
- Full name: Kamala Devi Yumnam
- Date of birth: 4 March 1992 (age 34)
- Place of birth: Thoubal, Manipur, India
- Height: 1.57 m (5 ft 2 in)
- Positions: Midfielder; striker

Team information
- Current team: United Kolkata SC
- Number: 9

Senior career*
Years	Team	Apps	(Gls)
2014–2024	Railways	44	(73)
2017–2019	Eastern Sporting Union	10	(15)
2019	Kolhapur City	5	(2)
2020	Gokulam Kerala	5	(6)
2022	East Coast Railway	10	(22)
2023–2024	Eastern Sporting Union	5	(3)
2024–2025	Nita FA		
2025–2026	Sribhumi	14	(2)
2025–	United Kolkata SC	4	(2)

International career^{‡}
2010–2021	India	51	(36)
- * Club domestic league appearances and goals as of 4 February 2020 ‡ National team caps and goals as of 2 December 2021

Kamala Devi Yumnam (Meitei: Yumnam Kamala Devi, born 4 March 1992) is an Indian professional footballer who plays as a midfielder for the Indian Women's League 2 club United Kolkata SC. She also played for Eastern Sporting Union in the Indian Women's League and represented the India women's national football team.

== Career ==
=== International career ===
Kamala Devi was a part of the Indian team that won the SAFF Women's Championship 2010, 2012, 2014, 2016–17 and the South Asian Games in 2010, 2016. At the 2012 tournament, she was awarded the Best Player of the Final. She finished the tournament scoring seven goals, also scoring in the final against Nepal, in the 83rd minute. At the 2014 Asian Games, she scored five goals in India's first match against Maldives. She scored five goals and was the top-scorer at the 2016 South Asian Games. This included a brace in the final against Nepal that helped her win the gold medal.

=== Club career ===
In 2016, Devi was signed by Eastern Sporting Union to play in the inaugural season of the Indian Women's League. She helped her team win the League scoring 15 goals in 10 games and was the joint top-scorer alongside Sanju Yadav. 12 of those goals came in the final round. It included a brace in the final against Rising Student.

Devi also plays for the Railways in various competitions.

Devi was awarded the AIFF title 2017 Woman Footballer of the Year on 23 July 2018.

== Career statistics ==
=== International ===
As of 2018

International caps and goals
Year	Caps	Goals
2010		0
2011		0
2012		7
2013		0
2014		9
2015		1
2016		7
2017		1
2018	3	3
Total		28

List of international goals scored by Yumnam Kamala Devi
No.	Date	Venue	Opponent	Score	Result	Competition
1.	29 January 2010	Bangabandhu National Stadium, Dhaka, Bangladesh	Sri Lanka	3–?	8–1	2010 South Asian Games
2.	6 February 2010	Bangabandhu National Stadium, Dhaka, Bangladesh	Bangladesh	?–0	7–0	2010 South Asian Games
3.	17 December 2010	Bir Shrestha Shahid Ruhul Amin Stadium, Cox's Bazar, Bangladesh	Bangladesh	1–0	6–0	2010 SAFF Women's Championship
4.	17 December 2010	Bir Shrestha Shahid Ruhul Amin Stadium, Cox's Bazar, Bangladesh	Bangladesh	2–0	6–0	2010 SAFF Women's Championship
5.	17 December 2010	Bir Shrestha Shahid Ruhul Amin Stadium, Cox's Bazar, Bangladesh	Bangladesh	4–0	6–0	2010 SAFF Women's Championship
6.	23 September 2011	Bahrain National Stadium, Manama, Bahrain	Bahrain	3–1	3–1	Friendly
7.	7 September 2012	CR & FC Grounds, Colombo, Sri Lanka	Bangladesh	1–0	3–0	2012 SAFF Women's Championship
8.	11 September 2012	CR & FC Grounds, Colombo, Sri Lanka	Bhutan	2–0	11–0	2012 SAFF Women's Championship
9.	11 September 2012	CR & FC Grounds, Colombo, Sri Lanka	Bhutan	4–0	11–0	2012 SAFF Women's Championship
10.	14 September 2012	CR & FC Grounds, Colombo, Sri Lanka	Afghanistan	1–0	11–0	2012 SAFF Women's Championship
11.	14 September 2012	CR & FC Grounds, Colombo, Sri Lanka	Afghanistan	5–0	11–0	2012 SAFF Women's Championship
12.	14 September 2012	CR & FC Grounds, Colombo, Sri Lanka	Afghanistan	11–0	11–0	2012 SAFF Women's Championship
13.	16 September 2012	CR & FC Grounds, Colombo, Sri Lanka	Nepal	3–1	3–1	2012 SAFF Women's Championship
14.	14 May 2013	Bahrain National Stadium, Manama, Bahrain	Bahrain	2–0	2–1	Friendly
15.	16 May 2013	Bahrain National Stadium, Manama, Bahrain	Bahrain	2–0	2–0	Friendly
16.	14 September 2014	Incheon Namdong Asiad Rugby Field, Incheon, South Korea	Maldives	2–0	15–0	2014 Asian Games
17.	14 September 2014	Incheon Namdong Asiad Rugby Field, Incheon, South Korea	Maldives	5–0	15–0	2014 Asian Games
18.	14 September 2014	Incheon Namdong Asiad Rugby Field, Incheon, South Korea	Maldives	7–0	15–0	2014 Asian Games
19.	14 September 2014	Incheon Namdong Asiad Rugby Field, Incheon, South Korea	Maldives	9–0	15–0	2014 Asian Games
20.	14 September 2014	Incheon Namdong Asiad Rugby Field, Incheon, South Korea	Maldives	12–0	15–0	2014 Asian Games
21.	13 November 2014	Jinnah Sports Stadium, Islamabad, Pakistan	Maldives	3–0	8–0	2014 SAFF Women's Championship
22.	13 November 2014	Jinnah Sports Stadium, Islamabad, Pakistan	Maldives	7–0	8–0	2014 SAFF Women's Championship
23.	19 November 2014	Jinnah Sports Stadium, Islamabad, Pakistan	Sri Lanka	5–0	5–0	2014 SAFF Women's Championship
24.	21 November 2014	Jinnah Sports Stadium, Islamabad, Pakistan	Nepal	1–0	6–0	2014 SAFF Women's Championship
25.	13 March 2015	Mandalarthiri Stadium, Mandalay, Myanmar	Sri Lanka	1–0	4–0	2016 AFC Women's Olympic Qualifying Tournament
26.	9 February 2016	Jawaharlal Nehru Stadium, Shillong, India	Sri Lanka	4–0	5–0	2016 South Asian Games
27.	13 February 2016	Jawaharlal Nehru Stadium, Shillong, India	Bangladesh	1–0	5–1	2016 South Asian Games
28.	13 February 2016	Jawaharlal Nehru Stadium, Shillong, India	Bangladesh	3–0	5–1	2016 South Asian Games
29.	15 February 2016	Jawaharlal Nehru Stadium, Shillong, India	Nepal	1–0	4–0	2016 South Asian Games
30.	15 February 2016	Jawaharlal Nehru Stadium, Shillong, India	Nepal	2–0	4–0	2016 South Asian Games
31.	27 December 2016	Kanchenjunga Stadium, Siliguri, India	Afghanistan	1–0	5–1	2016 SAFF Women's Championship
32.	27 December 2016	Kanchenjunga Stadium, Siliguri, India	Afghanistan	3–0	5–1	2016 SAFF Women's Championship
33.	2 January 2017	Kanchenjunga Stadium, Siliguri, India	Nepal	1–0	3–1	2016 SAFF Women's Championship
34.	8 November 2018	Thuwunna Stadium, Yangon, Myanmar	Nepal	1–1	1–1	2020 AFC Women's Olympic Qualifying Tournament
35.	11 November 2018	Thuwunna Stadium, Yangon, Myanmar	Bangladesh	1–0	7–1	2020 AFC Women's Olympic Qualifying Tournament
36.	11 November 2018	Thuwunna Stadium, Yangon, Myanmar	Bangladesh	4–0	7–1	2020 AFC Women's Olympic Qualifying Tournament

== Honours ==
India

- SAFF Championship: 2010, 2012, 2014, 2016
- South Asian Games Gold medal: 2010, 2016

Eastern Sporting Union

- Indian Women's League: 2016–17

Gokulam Kerala

- Indian Women's League: 2019–20

Railways

- Rajmata Jijabai Trophy: 2015–16

Manipur

- Rajmata Jijabai Trophy: 2008–09

Individual

- Indian Women's League Top Scorer: 2016–17
- AIFF Women's Footballer of the Year, 2017
- Top Scorer, South Asian Games, 2016- 5 Goals
- Most Valuable Player of the Final, SAFF Women's Championships, 2012.
- Top Scorer, 12 Goals, IWL, 2017
- Best Player, Senior Women's National Championships, 2016.
- Top Scorer 16 Goals, U-17, National Championships, 2006.
