= Jeppiaar Institute FC =

Indian association football club

Jeppiaar Institute
- Full name: Jeppiaar Institute Football Club
- Founded: 2016; 9 years ago
- Chairman: Subramanian Mariappan
- League: Pondicherry Men's League Championship; Pondicherry Women's League
- Website: https://www.jeppiaarinstitute.org/

Jeppiaar Institute Football Club, also known as Jeppiaar Institute Of Technology Football Club, is an Indian association football club based in Puducherry. The men's section competes in the Pondicherry Men's League Championship while the women's competes in the Pondicherry Women's League. They also competed in the inaugural Indian Women's League.

== History ==
Jeppiaar Institute FC was formed in 2016 as a team of 12 under-privileged girls coached by Mariappan, a football coach, who coached the boys living in a government-run children's home in Cuddalore, Tamil Nadu. The girls, also living in the home, asked him to coach them when he reluctantly agreed, a few years prior to the club's formation.

The men's side qualified for the fourth tier 2023–24 I-League 3 where they participated in the group stage but were unable to qualify for he play-offs.

== Team records (women's) ==
=== Seasons ===
| Year | League | | | | | | | | Top Scorer(s) | |
| Year | P | W | D | L | GF | GA | Pts | Pos. | Player(s) | Goals |
|---|---|---|---|---|---|---|---|---|---|---|
| 2016–17 | 5 | 1 | 1 | 3 | 4 | 18 | 4 | 5 | Sandhiya Ranganathan | 3 |
