= 2016–17 Indian Women's League =

Indian Women's League
- Season: 2016–17
- Champions: Eastern Sporting Union; 1st title
- Matches: 34
- Goals: 183 (5.38 per match)
- Best player: Thokchom Umapati Devi
- Top goalscorer: Yumnam Kamala Devi (12 goals)

The 2016–17 Indian Women's League (also known as Hero Indian Women's League for sponsorship reasons) was the first season of the Indian Women's League, a women's football league in India. The season was scheduled to kick off with the preliminary rounds on 17 October 2016. In the final round four teams from qualifier joined by two direct entry teams. Eastern Sporting Union won the title in the inaugural season.

== Preliminary round ==
=== Teams ===
Group A	State	Group B	State
Alakhpura	Haryana	Eastern Sporting Union	Manipur
Bodyline	Maharashtra	Jeppiaar Institute	Pondicherry
Quartz	Kerala	KRYPHSA	Manipur
Rising Student	Odisha	Sudeva Moonlight	Delhi
Royal Wahingdoh	Meghalaya	Uttar Pradesh FC	Uttar Pradesh

Eastern Sporting Union and Rising Student Club entered final rounds by topping their groups, and Alakhpura and Jeppiaar Institute as group runners-up.

== Teams ==
=== Team locations ===
Team	State	Entry
Eastern Sporting Union	Manipur	Preliminary
Rising Students	Odisha	Preliminary
Jeppiaar Institute	Puduchery	Preliminary
Alakhpura	Haryana	Preliminary
Pune City	Maharashtra	Direct
Aizawl	Mizoram	Direct

=== Personnel ===
Team	Head coach	Captain
Eastern Sporting Union	(India) Oinam Bembem Devi (player-manager)	
Rising Students	(India) Gitanjali Khuntia	(India) Sasmita Mallik
Jeppiaar Institute	(India) Subramanian Mariappan	(India) Sumithra Kamaraj
Alakhpura	(India) Sonika Vijarnia	(India) Sanju Yadav
Pune City	(India) Kalpana Dass	(India) Dalima Chhibber
Aizawl	(India) Pi R. Lalnunsangi	(India) K. Lalruaizeli

== Final round ==
The final round will be held from January 28 to February 14 at the Ambedkar Stadium. The league proper will follow a round robin format with the top four teams advancing to the semifinals.

=== Group stage ===
Pos	Team	Pld	W	D	L	GF	GA	GD	Pts	Qualification
1	Rising Students	5	4	0	1	20	3	+17	12	Semi Final
2	Eastern Sporting Union	5	4	0	1	15	4	+11	12	Semi Final
3	Alakhpura	5	2	2	1	8	4	+4	8	Semi Final
4	Pune City	5	2	1	2	6	8	−2	7	Semi Final
5	Jeppiaar Institute	5	1	1	3	5	18	−13	4	
6	Aizawl	5	0	0	5	5	22	−17	0	

Source: AIFF
Rules for classification: 1) points; 2) head-to-head points; 3) head-to-head goal difference; 4) goal difference; 5) number of goals scored; 6) drawing of lots

=== Knock-out Stage ===
Semi-finals
11 February 2017 – Ambedkar Stadium, New Delhi
Rising Student	2
Pune City	0
11 February 2017 – Ambedkar Stadium, New Delhi
Eastern Union	4
Alakhpura	1

Final
14 February 2017 – Ambedkar Stadium, New Delhi
Eastern Union	3
Rising Student	0

== Season awards ==
The following awards were announced at the end of the season:

- Emerging Player: Jabamani Tudu
- Most Valuable Player: Umapati Devi
- Top Scorer: Kamala Devi
