= 2019–20 Indian Women's League =

Women's football league in India

Indian Women's League
- Season: 2019–20
- Dates: 24 January – 14 February 2020
- Champions: Gokulam Kerala; 1st title
- AFC Club Championship: Gokulam Kerala
- Matches: 33
- Goals: 123 (3.73 per match)
- Best player: Ratanbala Devi
- Top goalscorer: Sabitra Bhandari (16 goals)
- Best goalkeeper: Linthoingambi Devi
- Longest winning run: Kryphsa; Gokulam Kerala (5 matches, only league matches)
- Longest unbeaten run: Kryphsa; Gokulam Kerala (5 matches, only league matches)
- Longest winless run: BBK Dav; Bidesh XI (5 matches)
- Longest losing run: Bidesh XI (5 matches)

The 2019–20 Indian Women's League (also known as Hero Indian Women's League for sponsorship reasons) was the fourth season of the Indian Women's League, the top division women's football league in India. The league started from 24 January 2020 and ended on 14 February 2020 with Gokulam Kerala defeating Kryphsa 3-2 in the final to clinch the title for the first time. Twelve teams participated in the league. All the matches were played in Bangalore Football Stadium, Bengaluru.

== AFC Women's Club Championship ==
The winners of the 2020–21 season would originally get the chance to participate in 2021 edition of AFC Women's Club Championship. But as a backup it was thought if the season is unable to complete or cancelled before the start of the tournament which will be held from October 30 to November 14, the defending champions of 2019–20 season, Gokulam Kerala will qualify for the event. Later on 15 July 2021, the All India Football Federation (AIFF) nominated Gokulam Kerala to represent India in the AFC Women’s Club Championship 2020–21 pilot tournament.

== Qualifiers ==
State women's leagues organized by various state federations acted as the qualifier this season. In addition to these, the Rest of India zone champions has been awarded a place in the final round. Gokulam Kerala defeated FC Alakhpura 9–1 over two legs to secure a place in the Group stage.

Rest of India Zone
Team 1	Agg.	Team 2	1st leg	2nd leg
Gokulam Kerala	9–1	FC Alakhpura	1–0	8–1

== Teams ==
Locations of the 2019-20 Indian Women's League teams

=== Team locations ===
Group A	State/UT	Group B	State/UT
Baroda Football Academy	Baroda, Gujarat	Bangalore United	Bengaluru, Karnataka
BBK Dav	Amritsar, Punjab	Bidesh XI	Assonora, Goa
Kolhapur City	Kolhapur, Maharashtra	Odisha Police	Bhubaneswar, Odisha
Kickstart	Bengaluru, Karnataka	Kenkre	Mumbai, Maharashtra
KRYPHSA	Imphal, Manipur	Sreebhumi	Kolkata, West Bengal
Sethu	Madurai, Tamil Nadu	Gokulam Kerala	Kozhikode, Kerala

=== Personnel ===
Team	Head coach	Captain
Bangalore United	(India) Chitra Gangadharan	(India) Amoolya Kamal
Baroda FA	(India) Muralidharan P	(India) Priya Mistry
BBK Dav	(India) Satpal Singh Kala	(India) Shyama Rani
Bidesh XI	(India) Joao Minino Rebello	(India) Astrid Pereira
Gokulam Kerala	(India) Priya P. V.	(India) Michel Castanha
Kolhapur City	(India) Muzamil Mahmood	(India) Mrunal Khot
Kickstart	(India) M Muruhuvedan	(India) Manpreet
Kenkre	(India) Kalpana Dass	(India) Soumya Guguloth
KRYPHSA	(India) Langam Chaoba Devi	(India) Grace Dangmei
Odisha Police	(India) Mohammad Shahid Jabbar	(India) Karishma Oram
Sethu	(India) Amrutha Arvind	(India) Ashalata Devi
Sreebhumi	(India) Barun Sengupta	(India) Poli Koley

== Foreign players ==
Club	Player 1	Player 2
Bangalore United	(England) Tanvie Hans	
Baroda Football Academy	No player was signed	
BBK Dav	No player was signed	
Bidesh XI	No player was signed	
Gokulam Kerala	(Nepal) Sabitra Bhandari	(Ivory Coast) Espérance Agbo
Kolhapur City	No player was signed	
Kickstart	No player was signed	
Kenkre	No player was signed	
KRYPHSA	No player was signed	
Odisha Police	No player was signed	
Sethu	(Nepal) Anita Basnet	
Sreebhumi	No player was signed	

== Final round ==
=== Group stage ===
==== Group A ====
Pos	Team	Pld	W	D	L	GF	GA	GD	Pts	Qualification
1	KRYPHSA	5	5	0	0	15	0	+15	15	Semi Final
2	Sethu	5	4	0	1	23	2	+21	12	Semi Final
3	Kickstart	5	3	0	2	6	7	−1	9	
4	Kolhapur City	5	1	1	3	3	8	−5	4	
5	Baroda Football Academy	5	1	0	4	3	13	−10	3	
6	BBK Dav	5	0	1	4	1	21	−20	1	

Source: AIFF
Rules for classification: 1) points; 2) head-to-head points; 3) head-to-head goal difference; 4) goal difference; 5) number of goals scored; 6) drawing of lots

==== Group B ====
Pos	Team	Pld	W	D	L	GF	GA	GD	Pts	Qualification
1	Gokulam Kerala	5	5	0	0	28	2	+26	15	Semi Final
2	Kenkre	5	4	0	1	13	14	−1	12	Semi Final
3	Odisha Police	5	2	1	2	9	12	−3	7	
4	Sreebhumi	5	1	2	2	4	5	−1	5	
5	Bangalore United	5	1	1	3	4	9	−5	4	
6	Bidesh XI	5	0	0	5	2	18	−16	0	

Source: AIFF
Rules for classification: 1) points; 2) head-to-head points; 3) head-to-head goal difference; 4) goal difference; 5) number of goals scored; 6) drawing of lots

=== Knock–out stage ===
Semi-finals
10 February 2020 – Bangalore Football Stadium, Bengaluru
KRYPHSA	3
Kenkre	1
10 February 2020 – Bangalore Football Stadium, Bengaluru
Gokulam Kerala	3
Sethu	0

Final
14 February 2020 – Bangalore Football Stadium, Bengaluru
KRYPHSA	2
Gokulam Kerala	3

== Season awards ==
The awards for the Hero Indian Women's League 2019–20 season:

Award	Recipient
Top Scorer	Sabitra Bhandari (Gokulam Kerala)
Best Goalkeeper	Maibam Linthoingambi Devi (KRYPHSA)
Most Valuable Player	Nongmaithem Ratanbala Devi (KRYPHSA)
Emerging Player	Manisha Kalyan (Gokulam Kerala)
