= Manipur Police SC =

Indian institutional association football club

- Full name: Manipur Police Sports Club
- Head coach: Oinam Bembem Devi`(women's)
- League: Manipur State League (men's); Manipur Women's League (women's)

Manipur Police Sports Club is an Indian institutional football club based in Manipur. Their men's team plays in the Manipur State League, while their women's team plays in the Manipur Women's League. The club also played in the Indian Women's League.

== Women's team ==
=== Club officials ===
Post	Name
Head coach	Oinam Bembem Devi
Assistant coach	Muthum Surmala Chanu
Team manager	Lourembam Ronibala Chanu
Physiotherapist	Laiphrakpam Ranjita Devi

=== 2019 players ===
Note: Flags indicate national team as defined under FIFA eligibility rules; some limited exceptions apply. Players may hold more than one non-FIFA nationality.

No.	Pos.	Nation	Player
1	GK	IND	Okram Roshini Devi
15	GK	IND	Elangbam Panthoi Chanu
21	GK	IND	Khumanthen Soni Devi
2	DF	IND	Gurumayum Radharani Devi
3	DF	IND	Ashem Romi Devi
4	DF	IND	Wayenbam Ranjibala Devi
5	DF	IND	Thokchom Umapati Devi
12	DF	IND	Thokchom Devjani Devi

No.	Pos.	Nation	Player
17	DF	IND	Rebika Oinam
6	MF	IND	Salam Pramodini Devi
7	MF	IND	Irom Prameshwori Devi
8	MF	IND	Moirangthem Mandakini Devi
9	MF	IND	Salam Rinaroy Devi
14	MF	IND	Leihourungbam Sanathoi Devi
19	MF	IND	Phanjoubam Bina Devi
16	FW	IND	Yumnam Laxmi Devi

== Honours ==
=== Men's team ===
- Churachand Singh Trophy
  - Champions (7): 1973, 1977, 1978, 1980, 1986, 1988, 1989
  - Runners-up (4): 1976, 1991, 2001, 2005–06
- Thangjam Birchandra-Maipakpi Memorial Winners' Cup
  - Champions (1): 2019
- S Birendra Singh Memorial Super Division Football League (Imphal West)
  - Champions (1): 2019
- Mayanglambam Chittamani Memorial Winners Cup
  - Champions (2): 2002, 2004

=== Women's team ===
- Indian Women's League
  - Runners-up (1): 2018–19
- Manipur Women's League
  - Champions (6): 2010, 2011, 2013, 2015, 2018, 2023–24
