= Indira Gandhi Academy for Sports and Education =

Indian women's association football club

- Nicknames: Indira Gandhi AfS&E
- Founded: 2017; 8 years ago
- League: Pondicherry Women's League
- Website: http://mamaniam.org

Indira Gandhi Academy for Sports and Education (AfS&E) is an Indian women's association football club based in Puducherry, that competes in the Pondicherry Women's League. They competed in the second edition of the Indian Women's League.

== History ==
Indira Gandhi AS&E joined the IWL in 2017 and was formed with core squad of the Jeppiaar Institute F.C which competed in the inaugural edition of IWL in 2016. They both compete in the Pondicherry Women’s League, the state league of Puducherry.

== Team records ==
=== Seasons ===
Year	League								Top Scorer(s)	
Year	P	W	D	L	GF	GA	Pts	Pos.	Player(s)	Goals
2017–18	6	1	0	5	8	29	3	6	Pradeepa Sekar	3

== Honours ==
- Pondicherry Women's League
  - Champions (1): 2020–21
