= 2017–18 Indian Women's League =

Indian Women's League
- Season: 2017–18
- Champions: Rising Students Club; 1st title
- Matches: 55
- Goals: 225 (4.09 per match)
- Best player: Irom Prameshwori Devi
- Top goalscorer: Bala Devi (12 goals)
- Best goalkeeper: Elangbam Panthoi Chanu
- Highest scoring: Indira Gandhi AS&E 1-10 KRYPHSA

The 2017–18 Indian Women's League (also known as Hero Indian Women's League for sponsorship reasons) was the second season of the Indian Women's League, a women's football league in India. The qualifiers for the league started from 25 November 2017. Rising Student's Club won the 2017–18 Indian Women's League.

== Preliminary round ==
The preliminary round was scheduled to be held from 25 November 2017 to 8 December 2017 at Rajarshi Shahu Stadium in Kolhapur. Thirteen teams entered the preliminary round. Teams were split into two groups and the top-ranked team from each group qualified for the final round.

== Teams ==
Locations of the 2017–18 Indian Women's League teams

=== Team locations ===
Group A	State/UT	Group B	State/UT
Sethu	Madurai, Tamil Nadu	Chandney Sporting Club	West Bengal
Indira Gandhi AS&E	Pondicherry	United Warriors SC	Phagwara, Punjab
Capital Complex	Naharlagun, Arunachal Pradesh	Hans Women	Delhi
Baroda Football Academy	Vadodara, Gujarat	India Rush Soccer	Maharashtra
Rising Students Club	Cuttack, Odisha	KRYPHSA	Manipur
J&K State Sports Council	Srinagar, Jammu and Kashmir	Eastern Sporting Union	Manipur
		SAI Women	

Rising Student's Club and Eastern Sporting Union qualified for final round by topping Group A and Group B respectively. Due to unavailability of teams from I-League and Indian Super League, four more teams from qualification round Sethu FC, Indira Gandhi AS&E, India Rush Soccer and KRYPHSA are promoted to final round.

=== Personnel ===
Team	Head coach	Captain
Eastern Sporting Union	(India) Oinam Bembem Devi	(India) Irom Prameshwori Devi
Gokulam Kerala	(India) Priya P. V.	(India) Anita Rawat
Indira Gandhi AS&E	(India) Amrutha Arvind	
KRYPHSA	(India) Langam Chaoba Devi	(India) Bala Devi
Rising Students Club	(India) Sukla Dutta	(India) Suprava Samal
Rush Soccer	(Canada) Claude Bolton	
Sethu	(India) Kalpana Dass	(India) Indumathi Kathiresan

== Foreign players ==
Club	Player 1	Player 2	Player 3
Eastern Sporting Union	—	—	—
Gokulam Kerala	(Uganda) Fazila Ikwaput	(Uganda) Ritah Nabbosa	—
Indira Gandhi AS&E	—	—	—
KRYPHSA	—	—	—
Rising Students Club	—	—	—
Rush Soccer	—	—	—
Sethu	(England) Tanvie Hans	(Bangladesh) Sabina Khatun	(Bangladesh) Krishna Rani Sarkar

== Final round ==
Final round will be played among seven teams who face each other once with the top four teams advancing to the semifinals. Gokulam Kerala FC women's team will be joined by Six teams from preliminary round.

=== Group stage ===
Pos	Team	Pld	W	D	L	GF	GA	GD	Pts	Qualification
1	KRYPHSA	6	4	2	0	24	3	+21	14	Semi Final
2	Eastern Sporting Union	6	4	2	0	11	5	+6	14	Semi Final
3	Sethu	6	4	1	1	11	9	+2	13	Semi Final
4	Rising Students Club	6	3	1	2	11	5	+6	10	Semi Final
5	Gokulam Kerala	6	1	1	4	6	12	−6	4	
6	Indira Gandhi AS&E	6	1	0	5	8	29	−21	3	
7	Rush Soccer	6	0	1	5	4	12	−8	1	

Source: AIFF
Rules for classification: 1) points; 2) head-to-head points; 3) head-to-head goal difference; 4) goal difference; 5) number of goals scored; 6) drawing of lots

=== Knock-out Stage ===
Semi-finals
12 April 2018 – JLN Stadium, Shillong
KRYPHSA	0 (3)
Rising Students (a.e.t.)	0 (4)
12 April 2018 – JLN Stadium, Shillong
Eastern Union	2
Sethu	0

Final
14 April 2018 – JLN Stadium, Shillong
Rising Students (a.e.t.)	1 (5)
Eastern Union	1 (4)

== Season awards ==
Hero Indian Women's League 2017–18 awards were given on April 14.

Award	Recipient
Top Scorer	Bala Devi (KRYPHSA)
Best Goalkeeper	Panthoi Chanu (Eastern Sporting Union)
Most Valuable Player	Prameshwori Devi (Eastern Sporting Union)
Emerging Player	Grace Dangmei (KRYPHSA)
