= Kickstart FC (women) =

Indian association football club based in Karnataka

Kickstart
- Full name: Kickstart Football Club Karnataka
- Short name: KFCW
- Founded: 9 July 2016; 10 years ago
- Ground: Kickstart Football Arena
- Capacity: 800
- Owner: Shekar Rajan; Laxman Bhattarai
- Head coach: Raghu Kumar Muniswamy
- League: Indian Women's League; Karnataka Women's League
- Website: kickstartfc.com
Home colours	Away colours

Kickstart Football Club Women is an Indian women's professional football club from Karnataka. It is the section of Kickstart FC and participates in Indian Women's League, the top flight of Indian women's football. Their best finish in the top tier was runner-up in the 2022–23 season.

== History ==
Kickstart FC was founded on 9 July 2016 by Shekar Rajan and Laxman Bhattarai to develop grassroot level football in Karnataka.

Kickstart FC women's team won the Karnataka Women's League seven times continuously in 2018–19, 2019–20, 2020–21, 2021-2022, 2022-2023, 2023-2024, 2024-2025 and 2025-2026 which is the top division women's premier football league in Karnataka.

They have qualified for Indian Women's League twice. In 2019–20 IWL, they finished 3rd in the group stage. They qualified again in 2021-22 where they finished 3rd in the league table, behind eventual champions Gokulam Kerala and Sethu FC.

Kickstart FC directly qualified for 2022–23 IWL as AIFF decided to give direct entry to top 4 teams from 2021 to 2022 season.

== Squad ==
As of 13 November 2026

Note: Flags indicate national team as defined under FIFA eligibility rules; some limited exceptions apply. Players may hold more than one non-FIFA nationality.

No.	Pos.	Nation	Player
1	GK	IND	Linthoingambi Devi Maibam (vice-captain)
2	DF	IND	Linthoingambi Devi Wangkhem
3	DF	IND	Sanjita Devi Thingbaijam
4	DF	IND	Afreen Peerbhoy
5	DF	IND	Nimita Gurung
6	MF	IND	Julan Nongmaithem
7	FW	IND	Karishma Shirvoikar
8	MF	CMR	Montah Pemboura Roukayatou
9	MF	IND	Pinku Devi Ngashepam
10	FW	GHA	Mercy Attobrah
11	DF	IND	Abhista Basnett
12	MF	IND	Kiran Pisda
14	FW	IND	Babita Devi Oinam
15	GK	IND	Adrija Sarkhel
16	MF	IND	Romina Begum Ipham
17	DF	IND	Aruna Bag (captain)

No.	Pos.	Nation	Player
18	MF	IND	Nira Chanu Longjam
19	FW	IND	Naotombi Devi Laishram
20	MF	IND	Monalisha Marandi
22	DF	IND	Payel Layek
23	FW	IND	Olivia Chanu Ningthoujam
24	GK	IND	Aiswarya Arumugam
26	FW	IND	Janvi Sahu
27	MF	IND	Daina Devi Konthoujam
28	FW	GHA	Holali Ativor
33	MF	IND	Dharshini Devi R.
44	MF	IND	Manasa K.
77	FW	IND	Anushka Kumari
99	MF	IND	Arina Devi Nameirakpam

== Records and statistics ==
As of 24 March 2024

Overall records
Season	Indian Women's League								KWL	Top Scorer	
Season	P	W	D	L	GF	GA	Pts	Position	KWL	Player	Goals
2019–20	5	3	0	2	6	7	9	Group stage	Champions		
2021–22	11	9	0	2	33	8	27	Third place	Champions		
2022–23	10	7	1	2	34	8	16	Runners-up	Champions	(Kenya) Kioko Elizabeth Katungwa (Nepal) Saru Limbu	7
2023–24	12	6	3	3	16	18	21	Third place	Champions	(India) Karishma Shirvoikar	8

== Honours ==
=== Domestic ===
- Indian Women's League
  - Runners-up (1): 2022–23

=== Regional ===
- Karnataka Women's League
  - Champions (7): 2019–20, 2020–21, 2021–22, 2022–23, 2023–24, 2024–25, 2025–26
