= Rising Students Club =

Multisports club in Odisha, India

- Ground: Barabati Stadium
- Capacity: 45,000
- Director: Sanjay Kumar Behera
- League: FAO League; Odisha Women's League
Home colours	Away colours

Rising Students Club is a professional multisports club based in Cuttack, Odisha, India. The club plays in the FAO League, the fourth tier of Indian football and top tier of Odisha state football. It played in the Indian Women's League, the top tier of Indian women's football, and currently participates in the Odisha Women's League. Rising Students Club were the champions of the Indian Women's League in the 2017–18 season.

== Women's team records ==
=== Seasons ===
As of 8 May 2019

Year	League								Top scorers
Year	P	W	D	L	GF	GA	Pos.	Players	Goals
2016–17	7	5	0	2	22	6	2nd	(India) Sasmita Malik	7
2017–18	8	3	3	2	12	6	1st	(India) Anju Tamang	4

=== 2019 squad ===
As of 11 May 2019

Note: Flags indicate national team as defined under FIFA eligibility rules; some limited exceptions apply. Players may hold more than one non-FIFA nationality.

No.	Pos.	Nation	Player
1	GK	IND	Susmita Bera
2	MF	IND	Laxmi Munda
3	DF	IND	Juli Kishan
4	DF	IND	Pipili Mohanty
5	DF	IND	Purnima Malik
6	MF	IND	Satyabadi Khadia
7	MF	IND	Sibani Sharma
8	GK	IND	Rani Bhowmick
9	FW	IND	Munica Minz

No.	Pos.	Nation	Player
10	MF	IND	Ashrita Kangadi
11	FW	IND	Devneta Roy
12	FW	IND	Sradhanjali Panda
14	FW	IND	Jasoda Munda
15	FW	IND	Jyoshna Kishan
16	FW	IND	Krishna Barick
17	FW	IND	Barsha Mahakud
18	FW	IND	Prerna Mishra
21	GK	IND	Puja Sahu

== Honours ==
=== Men's ===
- FAO League
  - Runners-up (3): 2010, 2015, 2019
- FAO Super Cup
  - Runners-up (1): 2018

=== Women's ===
- Indian Women's League
  - Champions (1): 2017–18
  - Runners-up (1): 2016–17
- FAO Women's League
  - Champions (3): 2013, 2017, 2020–21
