= Eastern Sporting Union =

Indian association football club

- Full name: Eastern Sporting Union
- Founded: March 14, 1946; 79 years ago
- League: Indian Women's League; Manipur Women's League
- 2022–23: IWL, Semifinalists
Home colours	Away colours

Eastern Sporting Union, known as ESU, is an Indian professional football club based in Imphal, Manipur. Its women's team competed in the Indian Women's League. Eastern Sporting Union is one of the most successful women's football club in India, and was the champion of the inaugural Indian Women's League.

== History ==
Founded on 14 March 1946, Eastern Sporting Union by the public leaders of East Imphal tehsil under the patronage of HH Bodhchandra Singh is one of the oldest clubs in Manipur. Their U15 youth boys' team competed in Manchester United Premier Cup of India.

== Team records ==
=== Seasons ===
Year	League							Top Scorer(s)	
Year	P	W	D	L	GF	GA	Pos.	Player(s)	Goals
2016–17	10	9	0	1	42	8	1st	(India) Kamala Devi	15
2017–18	8	5	3	0	14	6	2nd	(India) Irom Prameshwori Devi	4

== Women's squad ==
As of 24 April 2023

Note: Flags indicate national team as defined under FIFA eligibility rules; some limited exceptions apply. Players may hold more than one non-FIFA nationality.

No.	Pos.	Nation	Player
1	GK	IND	Elangbam Panthoi Chanu
2	DF	IND	Mayangmayum Achoubi
3	DF	IND	Heirangkhongjam Linda Chanu
4	DF	IND	Phanjoubam Nirmala Devi
5	DF	IND	Kangabam Anita Devi
7	MF	IND	Sultana Ms.
8	MF	IND	Moirangthem Mandakini Devi
9	FW	IND	Yumnam Kamala Devi
12	MF	IND	Baby Chiinngainuam Mate
13	DF	IND	Nandeibam Gitanjali Chanu

No.	Pos.	Nation	Player
16	MF	IND	Chandam Anjali Devi
17	FW	IND	Thiemlalnei
18	MF	IND	Lhingdeikim
21	GK	IND	Naorem Monika Devi
23	GK	IND	Rabina Thoudam
33	MF	IND	Salam Rinaroy Devi
99	MF	IND	Naobi Chanu Laishram

== Technical staff ==
As of 24 April 2023

Position	Name
Head coach	(India) Lourembam Ronibala Chanu
Goalkeeping coach	(India) S. Premjit Meitei

== Honours ==
=== Domestic tournaments ===
==== Cup ====
- Churachand Singh Trophy
  - Champions (3): 1967, 1972, 2002–03
  - Runners-up (1): 1974
- Shirui Lily Cup
  - Champions (1): 2004
- Kohima Royal Gold Cup
  - Runner-up (1): 1992

=== Women's team ===
- Indian Women's League
  - Champions (1): 2016–17
  - Runners-up (1): 2017–18
- Manipur Women's League
  - Champions (4): 2014, 2017, 2021, 2022–23
