= Indian Women's League =

Indian Women's professional football league

- Organising body: Capri Sports, AIFF
- Founded: 2016; 10 years ago
- Country: India
- Confederation: AFC
- Number of clubs: 8
- Level on pyramid: 1
- Relegation to: Indian Women's League 2
- International cup(s): AFC Women's Champions League; SAFF Women's Club Championship
- Current champions: East Bengal (2nd title)
- Most championships: Gokulam Kerala (3 titles)
- Broadcaster: AIFF (YouTube)
- Website: indianfootballleague.in
- Current: 2026–27 Indian Women's League

The Indian Women's League (IWL), officially known as LXME Indian Women's League for sponsorship reasons, is the women's top tier professional football league in India, founded in 2016. Currently, a total of 8 teams from across the country participate in the league.

The competition was planned since 2014 and got established in 2016, with the first season starting from October 2016 in Cuttack, Odisha. The league was launched as India's first professional football league for women with the aim to increase the player pool for India national team. Since 2019–20, the clubs that become champions are granted an opportunity to play in the AFC Women's Club Championship, the top tier women's club football competition in Asia.

Until now five clubs have been crowned as champions: Eastern Sporting Union, Rising Students Club, Sethu, Gokulam Kerala and East Bengal. Out of them Gokulam Kerala has lifted the championship trophy thrice.

== History ==
=== Origin ===
Official IWL logo

Since 1991, the top women's football tournament in India has been the Senior Women's National Football Championship, organised by the All India Football Federation. The tournament served as a female equivalent of the Santosh Trophy, with regional teams competing against each other. There had not been an organized national football league for women clubs; however, the first women's football league was set up by the Indian Football Association (West Bengal) in Kolkata as Calcutta Women's Football League in 1993. Regional leagues were also organised in Mumbai and Goa in 1998 and 1999 respectively by the respective state associations. Due to lack of support, these amateur leagues were postponed for a long period or completely dissolved after a short run.

=== Foundation ===
In 2014, after the success of the India women's team, mainly in the SAFF Women's Championship, a push to start a women's football league, along the lines of recently inaugurated and successful Indian Super League, happened. Clubs such as Pune and Bengaluru expressed interests in joining a national women's league. It was around this time that AIFF started plans to create a league for women along the lines of ISL.

On 21 April 2016, the AIFF president Praful Patel said that Indian Women's League would kick-off in October with six teams to be decided, and goal to expand to eight teams by 2017. Over two months later, on 5 July, AIFF organized a workshop to discuss the India women's national team and proposed women's football league. Five Indian Super League sides – Delhi Dynamos, Chennaiyin, Kerala Blasters, Pune City and Atletico de Kolkata, and three I-League sides – Bengaluru, Aizawl and Mumbai, attended the workshop. It was announced that the league would feature eight teams and two other spots would be determined through a preliminary round. The primary objective of the tournament was to capitalise the potential of Indian women and prepare them for the national team, so as to eventually qualify for AFC Women's Asian Cup and FIFA Women's World Cup.

The preliminary round of the inaugural season was played from 17 to 26 October in Cuttack by 8 teams qualifying through a national qualifier of 20 teams across the country, and the main round of six teams took place the following year from 28 January to 14 February in New Delhi. The six teams to participate in the main round were Aizawl, Alakhpura, Eastern Sporting Union, Jeppiaar Institute, Pune City and Rising Students' Club, and top four teams are decided to play the semi-finals after a single round-robin stage. Aizawl and Pune City were the only clubs from both the I-League and the ISL to field their women teams in the competition and had achieved direct qualification in main round. Eastern Sporting Union defeated Rising Students' Club by 3–0 in the final and became the inaugural champion of IWL.

=== Expansion and improvements (2017–present) ===
The following season the AIFF extended their partnership with Hero MotoCorp and rebranded the league as the Hero IWL. The organisers also allowed the signing of foreign players in the main round but restricted to only two foreigners in matchday squad, while only one could be named in the starting eleven. This season no other ISL or I-League club except Gokulam Kerala participated in the competition, therefore six teams were promoted from the preliminary round to the main round. Gokulam Kerala became the first Indian club to sign a foreigner, as they included two Ugandan internationals – Fazila Ikwaput and Rita Nabbosa. The only other club to sign foreigners was Sethu: Bangladeshi internationals Sabina Khatun and Krishna Rani Sarkar, and British midfielder Tanvie Hans. The preliminary round was played at Kolhapur from 25 November to 8 December 2017 among thirteen teams, and the main round was held from 26 March to 14 April 2018 in Shillong. Last season's finalists met once again in the finals, but Rising Students' Club beat Eastern Sporting Union this time in the penalties to win the league. From 2018–19 season, the qualification of teams was decided based on the results in respective state leagues, and the number of teams was also doubled to twelve. The format was also changed, and teams were divided into two groups to decide the top two from each group playing in the semi-finals. The season culminated with Sethu becoming the champion of IWL. Since 2019, AFC and FIFA jointly organised AFC Women's Club Championship, and India decided to participate in the second edition of the competition to be held in 2021 AFC Women's Club Championship. Therefore, the winner of the 2019–20 season was decided to be the probable representative of India in the continental tournament. At the final of the tournament, Gokulam Kerala became the champion of the season after remaining unbeaten throughout the tournament, thus became the first club to win the top-tier league of both men's and women's, and also the first Indian team to play in AFC Women's Club Championship. In 2021–22, the AIFF changed the format to a single round-robin tournament and the team that would remain at the top of the table at the end, would be declared as the champions. Gokulam Kerala became the first club to defend their league title by finishing the season unbeaten, hence qualifying for the continental tournament for the second time in a row. In 2022–23, the league got expanded to 16 teams, with the top 8 of previous season to be eligible for direct qualification to the next season, irrespective of their results in the state leagues.

On 22 September 2026, the AIFF and Capri Sports entered into a 15-year partnership for the commercial development and marketing rights of the Indian Women's League (IWL) and Indian Women's League 2 (IWL 2).

== Format ==
The competition format had varied over the initial seasons, but mostly played as a knock-out tournament where four teams qualified for the single-legged semi-finals through the group stage played in single round-robin format and eventually one would be declared as the champion by winning the final. Currently, the competition follows single round-robin league format of 12 rounds played at a single venue. The winners of respective state leagues, along with previous season's top four teams, receive direct qualification to the league. The interested clubs from the regions without any state tournament are to register for the IWL Qualifiers and earn a spot in the main round by winning the qualifier.

== Clubs ==
=== Current clubs ===
Locations of the Indian Women's League clubs

Club	City	State/Region	Stadium	Capacity
East Bengal	Kolkata	West Bengal	East Bengal Ground	23,500
Garhwal United	New Delhi	Delhi	Ambedkar Stadium	35,000
Gokulam Kerala	Kozhikode	Kerala	EMS Corporation Stadium	50,000
HOPS	New Delhi	Delhi	Ambedkar Stadium	35,000
Juba Sangha	New Delhi	Delhi	Ambedkar Stadium	35,000
Kickstart	Bengaluru	Karnataka	Bangalore Football Stadium	8,400
Nita	Cuttack	Odisha	Capital Football Arena	1,500
Sethu	Madurai	Tamil Nadu	Jawaharlal Nehru Stadium	40,000

== All time clubs ==
A total of 44 clubs have participated so far in the main round or regular season of IWL since its inception from 2016, up to the 2025–26 season. The following is a list of clubs that have played in the IWL at any time since its formation in 2016 to the current season.

=== All time clubs to play in the main round or regular season of IWL ===
Club	Location	No. of seasons	First app	Last app	Best finish
Aizawl Women	Aizawl, Mizoram	1	2016–17		6th in group (2016–17)
Alakhpura	Bawani Khera, Haryana	2	2016–17	2018–19	Semi-finalist (2016–17)
ARA	Ahmedabad, Gujarat	1	2021–22		8th (2021–22)
Bangalore United	Bangalore, Karnataka	2	2018–19	2019–20	5th in group (2018–19, 2019–20)
BBK DAV	Amritsar, Punjab	1	2019–20		6th in group (2019–20)
Baroda Football Academy	Vadodara, Gujarat	2	2018–19	2019–20	5th in group (2019–20)
Bidesh XI	Assonora, Goa	1	2019–20		6th in group (2019–20)
Celtic Queens	Pondicherry, Puducherry	1	2022–23		6th in group (2022–23)
CRPF	Jalandhar, Punjab	1	2022–23		5th in group (2022–23)
Churchill Brothers	Vasco da Gama, Goa	1	2022–23		8th in group (2022–23)
East Bengal	Kolkata, West Bengal	4	2022–23	2025–26	Champions (2024–25, 2025–26)
Eastern Sporting Union	Imphal, Manipur	3	2016–17	2022–23	Champions (2016–17)
Garhwal United	New Delhi, Delhi	1	2025–26		6th (2025–26)
Gokulam Kerala	Kozhikode, Kerala	8	2017–18	2025–26	Champions (2019–20, 2021–22, 2022–23)
Hans Women FC	New Delhi, Delhi	2	2018–19	2021–22	3rd in group (2018–19)
HOPS	New Delhi, Delhi	3	2022–23	2024–25	Quarter-finalist (2022–23)
Indian Arrows	Bhubaneswar, Odisha	1	2021–22		5th (2021–22)
Indira Gandhi AS&E	Pondicherry, Puducherry	1	2017–18		6th in group (2017–18)
Jeppiaar Institute	Pondicherry, Puducherry	1	2016–17		5th in group (2016–17)
Kahaani FC	Ahmedabad, Gujarat	1	2022–23		8th in group (2022–23)
Kenkre Women	Mumbai, Maharashtra	1	2019–20		Semi-finalist (2019–20)
Kickstart	Bangalore, Karnataka	6	2019–20	2025–26	Runners-up (2022–23)
Kolhapur City	Kolhapur, Maharashtra	2	2018–19	2019–20	3rd in group (2018–19)
KRYPHSA	Imphal, Manipur	2	2017–18	2019–20	Runners-up (2019–20)
Lords FA	Kochi, Kerala	1	2022–23		7th in group (2022–23)
Manipur Police	Imphal, Manipur	1	2018–19		Runners-up (2018–19)
Mata Rukmani SC	Bastar, Chhattisgarh	2	2021–22	2022–23	11th (2021–22)
Misaka United FC	Bengaluru, Karnataka	1	2022–23		5th in group (2022–23)
Mumbai Knights	Mumbai, Maharashtra	1	2022–23		6th in group (2022–23)
Nita	Cuttack, Odisha	2	2024–25	2025–26	4th (2025–26)
Odisha	Bhubaneswar, Odisha	3	2022–23	2024–25	Champions (2023–24)
Odisha Police	Bhubaneswar, Odisha	2	2019–20	2021–22	3rd in group (2019–20)
Panjim Footballers	Panaji, Goa	1	2018–19		4th in group (2018–19)
PIFA Sports Colaba	Mumbai, Maharashtra	1	2021–22		7th (2021–22)
Pune City	Pune, Maharashtra	1	2016–17		4th in group (2016–17)
Rising Students' Club	Cuttack, Odisha	3	2016–17	2018–19	Champions (2017–18)
Rush Soccer	Mumbai, Maharashtra	1	2017–18		7th in group (2017–18)
SAI-STC Cuttack	Cuttack, Odisha	1	2018–19		4th in group (2018–19)
SSB	Siliguri, West Bengal	2	2018–19	2021–22	Semi-finalist (2018–19)
Sesa	Sircaim, Goa	1	2025–26		8th (2025–26)
Sethu	Madurai, Tamil Nadu	8	2017–18	2025–26	Champions (2018–19)
Sirvodem	Navelim, Goa	1	2021–22		9th (2021–22)
Sports Odisha	Bhubaneswar, Odisha	3	2021–22	2023–24	4th (2021–22)
Sribhumi	Kolkata, West Bengal	3	2019–20	2025–26	3rd (2024–25)

=== Clubs promoted to IWL ===
Promoted clubs from IWL 2 to IWL
Season	Clubs
2023–24	Sribhumi, Nita
2024–25	Garhwal United, Sesa
2025–26	HOPS, Juba Sangha

=== Clubs relegated from IWL ===
Relegated clubs from IWL to IWL 2
Season	Clubs
2024–25	Odisha, HOPS
2025–26	Sribhumi, Sesa

== Sponsorship ==
In October 2016, it was announced that Hero MotoCorp would be the title sponsor for the league. The league is currently without a title sponsor, as Hero decided not to renew its sponsorship deal with Indian football after 2022–23 season.

In October 2026, it was announced that LXME, India's first women's investment and financial platform, would be the title sponsor for the league and hence the league would be known as Lxme Indian Women's League.

Period	Title sponsor	Tournament name
2016–2023	Hero	Hero Indian Women's League
2023–2026	none	Indian Women's League
2026–present	Lxme	Lxme Indian Women's League

== Media coverage ==
The first four seasons of the league lacked TV broadcasting, and matches were live streamed on the YouTube channel and the Facebook page of Indian Football. Live updates of matches were also available on the Twitter profile of Indian Football. In 2022, the AIFF reached a deal with Eurosport India to telecast the fifth edition of IWL, but only 30 matches out of total 66 matches were telecast. For the 2023–24 season, the broadcast was done on Indian Football YouTube channel. For the 2024–25 season, Shrachi Sports acquired the rights for the live streaming on SSEN digital app.

Period	TV telecast	Online streaming
2016–2021	none	YouTube
2021–2022	Eurosport	YouTube
2022–2024	none	YouTube
2024–2025	none	SSEN
2025–present	none	YouTube

== Champions ==
=== Championships by season ===
Season	Champions	Runners-up	Teams
2016–17	Eastern Sporting Union	Rising Students Club	6
2017–18	Rising Students Club	Eastern Sporting Union	7
2018–19	Sethu	Manipur Police	12
2019–20	Gokulam Kerala	KRYPHSA	12
~~2020–21~~	Cancelled due to COVID-19 pandemic		
2021–22	Gokulam Kerala	Sethu	12
2022–23	Gokulam Kerala	Kickstart	16
2023–24	Odisha	Gokulam Kerala	7
2024–25	East Bengal	Gokulam Kerala	8
2025–26	East Bengal	Sethu	8

=== Performance by clubs ===
Club	Champion	Runner-up	Winning season	Runner-up season
Gokulam Kerala	3	2	2019–20, 2021–22, 2022–23	2023–24, 2024–25
East Bengal	2	–	2024–25, 2025–26	–
Sethu	1	2	2018–19	2021–22, 2025–26
Eastern Sporting Union	1	1	2016–17	2017–18
Rising Students Club	1	1	2017–18	2016–17
Odisha	1	–	2023–24	–
Manipur Police	–	1	–	2018–19
KRYPHSA	–	1	–	2019–20
Kickstart	–	1	–	2022–23

== Winning head coaches ==
As of 18 April 2025

Head coach	Club	Wins	Winning season
(India) Oinam Bembem Devi	Eastern Sporting Union	1	2016–17
(India) Sukla Dutta	Rising Students	1	2017−18
(India) Amrutha Aravind	Sethu	1	2018−19
(India) Priya P. V.	Gokulam Kerala	1	2019–20
(India) Anthony Andrews	Gokulam Kerala	2	2021–22, 2022–23
(India) Anthony Andrews	East Bengal	2	2024–25, 2025–26
(India) Crispin Chettri	Odisha	1	2023–24

== Stadiums ==
East Bengal	Gokulam Kerala	HOPS	Kickstart
East Bengal Ground, Kolkata	EMS Stadium, Kozhikode	Ambedkar Stadium, New Delhi	Bangalore Football Stadium, Bengaluru
Capacity: 23,500	Capacity: 50,000	Capacity: 15,000	Capacity: 8,400
Nita	Odisha	Sethu	Sribhumi
Capital Football Arena, Bhubaneswar	Kalinga Stadium, Bhubaneswar	Marina Arena, Chennai	Bibhutibhushan Stadium, Barrackpore
Capacity: 1,500	Capacity: 15,000	Capacity: 40,000	Capacity: 5,000

== Records ==
=== Top goal scorers ===
As of 14 July 2023

Rank	Player	Seasons	Goals
1	(Nepal) Sabitra Bhandari	3	69
2	(India) Bala Devi	4	48
3	(India) Nongmaithem Ratanbala Devi	4	25
3	(India) Sandhiya Ranganathan	4	25
5	(India) Yumnam Kamala Devi	3	22
6	(Myanmar) Win Theingi Tun	1	18
7	(India) Grace Dangmei	4	15
7	(India) Anju Tamang	4	15
8	(India) Karishma Shirvoikar	2	11
10	(India) Manisha Kalyan	3	10
10	(India) Irom Prameshwori Devi	4	10
10	(India) Kashmina Devi	3	10
12	(India) Sanju Yadav	3	8
14	(India) Sasmita Malik	1	7
14	(India) Pyari Xaxa	3	7
14	(India) Soumya Guguloth	1	7
17	(Bangladesh) Sabina Khatun	1	6
17	(India) Jabamani Tudu	3	6
19	(Uganda) Fazila Ikwaput	1	5
19	(India) Heigrujam Daya Devi	1	5
19	(India) Indumathi Kathiresan	3	5
19	(India) Pradeepa Sekar	3	5
19	(India) Sumithra Kamaraj	2	5

=== Top scorers by season ===
Season	Player	Club	Goals
2016−17	(India) Kamala Devi Yumnam	Eastern Sporting Union	12
2017−18	(India) Bala Devi Ngangom	KRYPHSA	12
2018−19	(India) Bala Devi Ngangom	Manipur Police	26
2019–20	(Nepal) Sabitra Bhandari	Gokulam Kerala	16
2021–22	(Ghana) Elshaddai Acheampong	Gokulam Kerala	20
2022–23	(Nepal) Sabitra Bhandari	Gokulam Kerala	29
2023–24	(Uganda) Fazila Ikwaput	Gokulam Kerala	13
2024–25	(Uganda) Fazila Ikwaput	Gokulam Kerala	24
2025–26	(Uganda) Fazila Ikwaput	East Bengal	20

== See also ==
- Football in India
- Women's football in India
- SAFF Club Women's Championship
