= 2022–23 Indian Women's League =

Indian Women's League
- Season: 2022–23
- Dates: 26 April – 21 May 2023
- Champions: Gokulam Kerala; 3rd title
- AFC Club Championship: Gokulam Kerala
- Matches: 63
- Goals: 262 (4.16 per match)
- Best Player: Indumathi Kathiresan
- Top goalscorer: Sabitra Bhandari (29 goals)
- Best goalkeeper: Maibam Linthoingambi Devi
- Highest scoring: Gokulam Kerala 14–1 Kahaani
- Longest winning run: Sethu (5 matches)
- Longest unbeaten run: Gokulam Kerala (10 matches)
- Longest winless run: Kahaani; Mata Rukmani Girls (7 matches)
- Longest losing run: Kahaani; Mata Rukmani Girls; Lords FA (6 matches)

The 2022–23 Indian Women's League (also known as Hero Indian Women's League for sponsorship reasons) was the sixth season of the Indian Women's League, the top division women's professional football league in India. On 21 May, Gokulam Kerala successfully defended their title by winning the final against Kickstart, and became the first club to complete a hat-trick of Indian Women's League titles.

== Format ==
The draw took place on 30 March 2023 at Football House, Dwarka, New Delhi. Speaking at the draw, Shaji Prabhakaran, the All India Football Federation Secretary General, said "My best wishes to all the 16 teams ... all efforts have been made to create a holistic situation for the development and rapid growth of Indian women's football."

Sixteen teams will participate in the league. The final round will consist of the group format with eight teams participating in each group. The top four teams from each group will qualify for the knockout stage. The top eight teams of the season will receive direct slots for the next season of IWL.

=== Broadcasting ===
On 25 April, 2023 All India Football Federation announced that the evening matches of Indian Women's League will be streamed live on Indian Football YouTube channel.

== Qualification ==
State women's leagues organised by various state federations acted as qualifier for this season. The champions of the twelve state leagues have been awarded a place in the final round along with the clubs which finished in the top four positions in the 2021–22 season. The slot for the state league whose current champions also qualified via top four qualification, went to the runner-up of the league.

Club	State/Region	Qualifying method
2021–22 Indian Women's League
Gokulam Kerala	Kerala	Champions
Sethu	Tamil Nadu	Runners-up
Kickstart	Karnataka	Third place
Sports Odisha	Odisha	Fourth place
2022–23 Indian Women's State leagues
Celtic Queens	Puducherry	2022–23 Pondicherry Women's League champions
CRPF	Punjab	2022–23 Punjab Women's League champions
Churchill Brothers	Goa	2022–23 Goa Women's League champions
East Bengal	West Bengal	2022–23 Calcutta Women's Football League champions
Eastern Sporting Union	Manipur	2022–23 Manipur Women's League champions
HOPS	Delhi	2022–23 FD Women's League champions
Kahaani	Gujarat	2022–23 Gujarat State Women's League champions
Lords FA	Kerala	2022–23 Kerala Women's League champions
Mata Rukmani Girls	Chhattisgarh	2022–23 Chhattisgarh State Women's Football League champions
Misaka United	Karnataka	2022–23 Karnataka Women's League runner-up (Note: The champions of the 2022–23 Karnataka Women's League, Kickstart had already qualified.)
Mumbai Knights	Maharashtra	2022–23 WIFA Women's Football League champions
Odisha	Odisha	2022–23 Odisha Women's League champions

== Clubs ==
Locations of the Indian Women's League clubs
Locations of the stadiums for IWL

=== Stadiums and locations ===
The matches were played at two venues located in Ahmedabad, Gujarat; Transstadia and Shahibaug Police Stadium.

Club	City	State/Region
Celtic Queens	Pondicherry	Puducherry
Churchill Brothers	Vasco da Gama	Goa
CRPF	Jalandhar	Punjab
East Bengal	Kolkata	West Bengal
Eastern Sporting Union	Imphal	Manipur
Gokulam Kerala	Kozhikode	Kerala
HOPS	New Delhi	Delhi
Kahaani	Ahmedabad	Gujarat
Kickstart	Bengaluru	Karnataka
Lords FA	Kochi	Kerala
Mata Rukmani	Bastar	Chhattisgarh
Misaka United	Bengaluru	Karnataka
Mumbai Knights	Mumbai	Maharastra
Odisha	Bhubaneswar	Odisha
Sethu	Madurai	Tamil Nadu
Sports Odisha	Bhubaneswar	Odisha

=== Personnel and sponsorships ===
Team	Head coach	Captain	Kit manufacturer	Shirt sponsor
Celtic Queens	(India) Nitesh Sharma	(India) Sujata Shetty		
Churchill Brothers	(India) Girijadevi Desai	(India) Laura Estibeiro		
CRPF	(India) Uttam Singh Negi	(India) Binita Kerketta		
East Bengal	Sujata Kar	(India) Ratna Halder	Trak Only	Emami
Eastern Sporting Union	(India) Lourembam Ronibala Chanu	(India) Irom Prameshwori Devi		Karkinos Healthcare
Gokulam Kerala	(India) Anthony Andrews	(India) Grace Dangmei	SEGA	CSB Bank
HOPS	(India) Sanjay Singh	(India) Renu Gour	Roseate	Dharam Foundation
Kahaani	(India) Lalita Saini	(India) Maya Rabari		Sameeksha Capital
Kickstart	(India) Langam Chaoba Devi	(India) Dalima Chhibber		Haier
Lords FA	(India) Nirvan Jagdish Shah	(India) Bhagyashree Dalvi		ICCS College of Engg and Mgmt, Joy E Bike
Mata Rukmani	(India) Shantanu Ghosh	(India) Nilima Khakha		COSCO
Misaka United	(India) Anup Theres Raj	(India) Tarini Kumar	Hummel	MFAR Constructions, Five Morsels Press
Mumbai Knights	(India) Rutuja Gunwant	(India) Valencia Lourdina D'mello		
Odisha	(India) Crispin Chettri	(India) Bala Devi	Trak Only	Odisha Tourism
Sethu	(India) Joseph Naik	(India) Naorem Priyangka Devi		COSCO
Sports Odisha	(India) Paromita Sit	(India) Mamata Patra	Nivia Sports	Odisha Tourism

== Foreign players ==
Teams allowed to register maximum of three foreign players. Only two can be part of the starting lineup.

Club	Player 1	Player 2	Player 3
Celtic Queens	(Ghana) Mercy Amorkor Tagoe	(Kenya) Idah Atieno Odhiambo	—
Churchill Brothers	—	—	—
CRPF	—	—	—
East Bengal	—	—	—
Eastern Sporting Union	—	—	—
Gokulam Kerala	(Nepal) Sabitra Bhandari	(Ghana) Vivian Adjei	(Ghana) Beatrice Ntiwaa Nketia
HOPS	—	—	—
Kahaani	—	—	—
Kickstart	(Nepal) Saru Limbu	(Nepal) Renuka Nagarkote	(Kenya) Kioko Elizabeth Katungwa
Lords FA	(Philippines) Camille Rodriguez	(Nepal) Anita Basnet	—
Mata Rukmani	—	—	—
Misaka United	(Malaysia) Nurul Azurin Mazlan	(Kenya) Lucy Kwekwe Jira	(Ghana) Sonia Opoku
Mumbai Knights	(United States) Alexandra Marie Eccard	—	—
Odisha	(Brazil) Cynthia Santos	(Ghana) Faustina Worwornyo Akpo	—
Sethu	(Nepal) Anjila Tumbapo Subba	(Kenya) Dorcas Sikobe	(Kenya) Ivy Faith Atieno
Sports Odisha	(Nepal) Rekha Poudel	—	—

== Group stage ==
=== Group A ===
Pos	Team	Pld	W	D	L	GF	GA	GD	Pts	Qualification
1	Gokulam Kerala (C)	7	6	1	0	53	5	+48	19	Qualification for Knockout stage and 2023–24 Indian Women's League
2	Sports Odisha	7	4	1	2	11	13	−2	13	Qualification for Knockout stage and 2023–24 Indian Women's League
3	East Bengal	7	4	1	2	12	13	−1	13	Qualification for Knockout stage and 2023–24 Indian Women's League
4	HOPS	7	4	0	3	14	7	+7	12	Qualification for Knockout stage and 2023–24 Indian Women's League
5	Misaka United	7	2	4	1	9	2	+7	10	
6	Mumbai Knights	7	3	1	3	7	18	−11	10	
7	Mata Rukmani	7	0	1	6	0	18	−18	1	
8	Kahaani	7	0	1	6	1	31	−30	1	

Source: AIFF
Rules for classification: 1) points; 2) head-to-head points; 3) head-to-head goal difference; 4) goal difference; 5) number of goals scored; 6) drawing of lots
(C) Champions

==== Matches ====
26 April 2023	Sports Odisha	3–2	HOPS	Ahmedabad
08:00 UTC+5:30	Rekha Poudel 51'; Manisha Naik 58'; Anju 90+5'	Report	Shailja 74'; Rajni Bala 81'	Stadium: Shahibaug Police Stadium; Attendance: 0 Referee: Snigdha Mondal; Player of the Match: Anju (Sports Odisha)

26 April 2023	Misaka United	2–0	Mata Rukmani	Ahmedabad
08:00 UTC+5:30	Lalrinmuani 45+4', 67'	Report		Stadium: Transstadia; Attendance: 150; Referee: Neetu Rana; Player of the Match: Lalrinmuani (Misaka United)

26 April 2023	Kahaani	0–1	Mumbai Knights	Ahmedabad
16:30 UTC+5:30		Report	Priyanka 24'	Stadium: Shahibaug Police Stadium; Attendance: 20; Referee: Monika Jana; Player of the Match: Mansi Anant Samre (Mumbai Knights)

26 April 2023	East Bengal	2–8	Gokulam Kerala	Ahmedabad
08:00 UTC+5:30	Rimpa Haldar 10'; Tulsi Hembram 63'	Report	Bhandari 2', 4', 22', 70', 89'; Indumathi 7'; Dangmei 77'; Adjei 79'	Stadium: Transstadia; Attendance: 100; Referee: G. Ruba Devi; Player of the Match: Sabitra Bhandari (Gokulam Kerala)

29 April 2023	Mumbai Knights	1–0	Mata Rukmani	Ahmedabad
08:00 UTC+5:30	Namita Belsariya 12' (o.g.)	Report		Stadium: Shahibaug Police Stadium; Attendance: 100; Referee: Harsha Saini; Player of the Match: Priyanka (Mumbai Knights)

29 April 2023	HOPS	1–0	Misaka United	Ahmedabad
08:00 UTC+5:30	Renu 63'	Report		Stadium: Transstadia; Attendance: 0 Referee: Rachana Hasmukh Kamani; Player of the Match: Renu Rani (HOPS)

29 April 2023	Gokulam Kerala	8–1	Sports Odisha	Ahmedabad
16:30 UTC+5:30	Bhandari 7', 62', 63', 79'; Adjei 28', 86'; Dangmei 43'; Hemam Shilky Devi 70'	Report	Sumitra Hembram 12'	Stadium: Transstadia; Attendance: 100; Referee: Phurki Lhamu Bhutia; Player of the Match: Vivian Adjei (Gokulam Kerala)

29 April 2023	East Bengal	1–0	Kahaani	Ahmedabad
16:30 UTC+5:30	Ratna Halder 79' (pen.)	Report		Stadium: Shahibaug Police Stadium; Attendance: 50; Referee: G. Ruba Devi; Player of the Match: Aarti Banwari (Kahaani)

2 May 2023	HOPS	0–3	Gokulam Kerala	Ahmedabad
08:00 UTC+5:30		Report	Roja Devi 38'; Bhandari 49', 63'	Stadium: Shahibaug Police Stadium; Attendance: 100; Referee: Pooja S. Player of the Match: Hemam Shilky Devi (Gokulam Kerala)

2 May 2023	Misaka United	0–0	Mumbai Knights	Ahmedabad
08:00 UTC+5:30		Report		Stadium: Transstadia; Attendance: 10; Referee: Phurki Lhamu Bhutia; Player of the Match: Lavanya Upadhyay (Misaka United)

2 May 2023	Sports Odisha	3–0	Kahaani	Ahmedabad
16:30 UTC+5:30	Rekha Poudel 11', 86'; Nisha 87'	Report		Stadium: Shahibaug Police Stadium; Attendance: 70; Referee: Monika Jana; Player of the Match: Sanfida Nongrum (Sports Odisha)

2 May 2023	Mata Rukmani	0–2	East Bengal	Ahmedabad
16:30 UTC+5:30		Report	Mousumi Murmu 25'; Rimpa Haldar 73'	Stadium: Transstadia; Attendance: 0 Referee: Rachana Hasmukh Kamani; Player of the Match: Rimpa Haldar (East Bengal)

4 May 2023	East Bengal	4–2	Mumbai Knights	Ahmedabad
08:00 UTC+5:30	Rimpa Haldar 29', 55'; Tulsi Hembram 37'; Mousumi Murmu 43'	Report	Priyanka 65'; Namrata Thakur 83'	Stadium: Shahibaug Police Stadium; Attendance: 100; Referee: Pooja S. Player of the Match: Rimpa Haldar (East Bengal)

4 May 2023	Gokulam Kerala	0–0	Misaka United	Ahmedabad
08:00 UTC+5:30		Report		Stadium: Transstadia; Attendance: 50; Referee: Kanika Barman; Player of the Match: Nurul Azurin Mazlan (Misaka United)

4 May 2023	Sports Odisha	1–0	Mata Rukmani	Ahmedabad
16:30 UTC+5:30	Manisha Naik 54'	Report		Stadium: Shahibaug Police Stadium; Attendance: 0 Referee: Phurki Lhamu Bhutia; Player of the Match: Manisha Naik (Sports Odisha)

4 May 2023	Kahaani	0–6	HOPS	Ahmedabad
16:30 UTC+5:30		Report	Renu 3', 35'; Santosh 6'; Tannu 11', 63'; Kajal 47'	Stadium: Transstadia; Attendance: 70; Referee: G. Ruba Devi; Player of the Match: Santosh (HOPS)

6 May 2023	Gokulam Kerala	14–1	Kahaani	Ahmedabad
08:00 UTC+5:30	Sandhiya 18', 53', 67', 68', 88'; Bhandari 20', 76', 90+4', 90+7'; Shilky Devi 33'; Indumathi 45+1', 83'; Adjei 49'; Ashalata Devi 81'	Report	Ranjana Chanu 10' (o.g.)	Stadium: Shahibaug Police Stadium; Attendance: 10; Referee: Phurki Lhamu Bhutia; Player of the Match: Sandhiya Ranganathan (Gokulam Kerala)

6 May 2023	Mumbai Knights	2–1	Sports Odisha	Ahmedabad
08:00 UTC+5:30	Ritu 45+5'; Shirvoikar 47' (pen.)	Report	Anju 34'	Stadium: Transstadia; Attendance: 100; Referee: Neetu Rana; Player of the Match: Karishma Shirvoikar (Mumbai Knights)

6 May 2023	HOPS	3–0	Mata Rukmani	Ahmedabad
16:30 UTC+5:30	Renu 43' (pen.); Santosh 70'; Mamta 82'	Report		Stadium: Shahibaug Police Stadium; Attendance: 50; Referee: Monika Jana; Player of the Match: Renu Rani (HOPS)

6 May 2023	Misaka United	1–1	East Bengal	Ahmedabad
16:30 UTC+5:30	Lavanya Upadhyay 45+4'	Report	Singo Murmu 70'	Stadium: Transstadia; Attendance: 80; Referee: G. Ruba Devi; Player of the Match: Sunalinda Lawren (Misaka United)

9 May 2023	Kahaani	0–6	Misaka United	Ahmedabad
08:00 UTC+5:30		Report	Lucy Kwekwe Jira 3', 26', 38'; Lalrinmuani 55'; Lavanya Upadhyay 73'	Stadium: Transstadia; Attendance: 25; Referee: Monika Jana; Player of the Match: Lucy Kwekwe Jira (Misaka United)

9 May 2023	Sports Odisha	2–1	East Bengal	Ahmedabad
08:00 UTC+5:30	Rekha Poudel 60'; Ritu Devi 90+4'	Report	Mousumi Murmu 63'	Stadium: Shahibaug Police Stadium; Attendance: 70; Referee: Phurki Lhambu Bhutia; Player of the Match: Mousumi Murmu (East Bengal)

9 May 2023	Mata Rukmani	0–9	Gokulam Kerala	Ahmedabad
16:30 UTC+5:30		Report	Ranjana Chanu 5'; Bhandari 7', 12', 68', 69'; Dangmei 20'; Shilky Devi 27'; Indumathi 35', 45+3'	Stadium: Shahibaug Police Stadium; Attendance: 10; Referee: Harsha Saini; Player of the Match: Sabitra Bhandari (Gokulam Kerala)

9 May 2023	HOPS	2–0	Mumbai Knights	Ahmedabad
16:30 UTC+5:30	Neha 23'; Rajni Bala 90+1'	Report		Stadium: Transstadia; Attendance: 100; Referee: G. Ruba Devi; Player of the Match: Neha (HOPS)

12 May 2023	Kahaani	0–0	Mata Rukmani	Ahmedabad
08:00 UTC+5:30		Report		Stadium: Shahibaug Police Stadium; Attendance: 60; Referee: Pooja S. Player of the Match: Aarti Banwari (Kahaani)

12 May 2023	East Bengal	1–0	HOPS	Ahmedabad
08:00 UTC+5:30	Ratna Halder 35' (pen.)	Report		Stadium: Transstadia; Attendance: 100; Referee: Rachana Hasmukh Kamani; Player of the Match: Ratna Halder (East Bengal)

12 May 2023	Misaka United	0–0	Sports Odisha	Ahmedabad
16:30 UTC+5:30		Report		Stadium: Transstadia; Attendance: 0 Referee: Kanika Barman; Player of the Match: Nisilia Majaw (Misaka United)

12 May 2023	Gokulam Kerala	11–1	Mumbai Knights	Ahmedabad
16:30 UTC+5:30	Indumathi 10'; Bhandari 11', 16', 32', 39', 55', 89', 90+3'; Sandhiya 15', 57'; Roja Devi 62'	Report	Bhumika Mane 43'	Stadium: Shahibaug Police Stadium; Attendance: 50; Referee: Phurki Lhamu Bhutia; Player of the Match: Sabitra Bhandari (Gokulam Kerala)

=== Group B ===
Pos	Team	Pld	W	D	L	GF	GA	GD	Pts	Qualification
1	Sethu	7	5	2	0	25	2	+23	17	Qualification for Knockout stage and 2023–24 Indian Women's League
2	Kickstart	7	5	1	1	30	2	+28	16	Qualification for Knockout stage and 2023–24 Indian Women's League
3	Odisha	7	5	1	1	28	2	+26	16	Qualification for Knockout stage and 2023–24 Indian Women's League
4	Eastern Sporting Union	7	5	0	2	12	10	+2	15	Qualification for Knockout stage and 2023–24 Indian Women's League
5	CRPF	7	2	1	4	9	26	−17	7	
6	Celtic Queens	7	1	1	5	5	25	−20	4	
7	Lords FA	7	1	0	6	11	24	−13	3	
8	Churchill Brothers	7	1	0	6	6	35	−29	3	

Source: AIFF
Rules for classification: 1) points; 2) head-to-head points; 3) head-to-head goal difference; 4) goal difference; 5) number of goals scored; 6) drawing of lots

==== Matches ====
27 April 2023	Eastern Sporting Union	1–0	Kickstart	Ahmedabad
08:00 UTC+5:30	Mandakini Devi 27'	Report		Stadium: Transstadia; Attendance: 100; Referee: Kumari Nandita; Player of the Match: Moirangthem Mandakini Devi (Eastern Sporting Union)

27 April 2023	Lords FA	4–0	Celtic Queens	Ahmedabad
08:00 UTC+5:30	Fragrancy Riwan 8'; Rodriguez 53', 62', 90+3'	Report		Stadium: Shahibaug Police Stadium; Attendance: 105; Referee: Pooja S. Player of the Match: Camille Rodriguez (Lords FA)

27 April 2023	CRPF	0–6	Odisha	Ahmedabad
16:00 UTC+5:30		Report	Hauhnar 19'; Cynthia Santos 29'; Faustina Worwornyo Akpo 44'; Lynda Kom 45+2'; Bala Devi 65'; Jasoda Munda 66'	Stadium: Transstadia; Attendance: 0 Referee: Sen Hangma Subba; Player of the Match: Grace Hauhnar (Odisha)

28 April 2023	Churchill Brothers	0–6	Sethu	Ahmedabad
08:00 UTC+5:30		Report	Kajol D'Souza 9', 11', 42', 45'; Ivy Faith Atieno 54'; Sunita Munda 72'	Stadium: Shahibaug Police Stadium; Attendance: 50; Referee: Kanika Barman; Player of the Match: Kajol D'Souza (Sethu)

30 April 2023	Celtic Queens	0–3	Eastern Sporting Union	Ahmedabad
08:00 UTC+5:30		Report	Phanjoubam Nirmala Devi 4'; Rinaroy Devi 7'; Lhingneilam Kipgen 66'	Stadium: Transstadia; Player of the Match: Kamala Devi (Eastern Sporting Union)

30 April 2023	Odisha	0–2	Kickstart	Ahmedabad
08:00 UTC+5:30		Report	Kioko Elizabeth Katungwa 36'; Laishram Bibicha Devi 73'	Stadium: Shahibaug Police Stadium; Player of the Match: Kioko Elizabeth Katungwa (Kickstart)

30 April 2023	Sethu	4–1	Lords FA	Ahmedabad
16:30 UTC+5:30	Sumati Kumari 40'; Kajol D'Souza 58', 85'; Priyangka Devi 69'	Report	Rodriguez 90+4' (pen,)	Stadium: Transstadia; Attendance: 70; Referee: Neetu Rana; Player of the Match: Sumati Kumari (Sethu)

30 April 2023	Churchill Brothers	1–2	CRPF	Ahmedabad
16:30 UTC+5:30	Karen Estrocio 52'	Report	Binita Kerketta 4'; Karam Tony Devi 89'	Stadium: Shahibaug Police Stadium; Attendance: 50; Referee: Kumari Nandita; Player of the Match: Neha Mann (CRPF)

3 May 2023	Eastern Sporting Union	0–4	Odisha	Ahmedabad
08:00 UTC+5:30		Report	Tamang 17'; Bala Devi 25'; Jasoda Munda 46'; Lynda Kom 90+7'	Stadium: Transstadia; Attendance: 100; Referee: Snigdha Mondal; Player of the Match: Jasoda Munda (Odisha)

3 May 2023	Celtic Queens	1–7	Sethu	Ahmedabad
08:00 UTC+5:30	Kayenpaibam Anju Chanu 84'	Report	Kajol D'Souza 15', 53'; Narzary 19'; Sunita Munda 45+4', 74'; Misha Bhandari 48'; Priyadharshini S 80'	Stadium: Shahibaug Police Stadium; Attendance: 80; Referee: Neetu Rana; Player of the Match: Ivy Faith Atieno (Sethu)

3 May 2023	Kickstart	10–0	Churchill Brothers	Ahmedabad
16:30 UTC+5:30	Kioko Elizabeth Katungwa 14', 23'; Limbu 36', 90'; Sonia Marak 45+5'; Kaviya Pakkirisamy 68', 78', 82', 90+8'; Laishram Bibicha Devi 72'	Report		Stadium: Transstadia; Attendance: 0 Referee: Sen Hangma Subba; Player of the Match: Kaviya Pakkirisamy (Kickstart)

3 May 2023	Lords FA	2–5	CRPF	Ahmedabad
16:30 UTC+5:30	Rodriguez 58', 60'	Report	Neha Mann 4', 45+3'; Nisha 25'; Syed Buckshira 35'; Tensubam Neelam Devi 40'	Stadium: Shahibaug Police Stadium; Attendance: 50; Referee: Harsha Saini; Player of the Match: Neha Mann (CRPF)

5 May 2023	Churchill Brothers	0–10	Odisha	Ahmedabad
08:00 UTC+5:30		Report	Bala Devi 8', 21'; Jasoda Munda 12'; Karishma Oram 18', 45+3'; Karthika Angamuthu 39'; Faustina Worwornyo Akpo 56'; Lynda Kom 60'; Malati Munda 65', 90+1'	Stadium: Transstadia; Attendance: 10; Referee: Rachana Hasmukh Kamani; Player of the Match: Lynda Kom (Odisha)

5 May 2023	Sethu	3–0	Eastern Sporting Union	Ahmedabad
08:00 UTC+5:30	Priyangka Devi 24'; Sumati Kumari 60'; Pisda 87'	Report		Stadium: Shahibaug Police Stadium; Attendance: 0 Referee: Kumari Nandita; Player of the Match: Priyangka Devi (Sethu)

5 May 2023	Lords FA	1–4	Kickstart	Ahmedabad
16:30 UTC+5:30	Rodriguez 34' (pen.)	Report	Kioko Elizabeth Katungwa 4'; Laishram Bibicha Devi 26'; Limbu 39'; Sonia Marak 66'	Stadium: Transstadia; Attendance: 100; Referee: Snigdha Mondal; Player of the Match: Astam Oraon (Kickstart)

5 May 2023	CRPF	2–2	Celtic Queens	Ahmedabad
16:30 UTC+5:30	Nisha 45+5'; Ritu 48'	Report	Mangpineng Khongsai 39' (pen.); Kayenpaibam Anju Chanu 56'	Stadium: Shahibaug Police Stadium; Attendance: 70; Referee: Harsha Saini; Player of the Match: Kayenpaibam Anju Chanu (Celtic Queens)

7 May 2023	Celtic Queens	0–5	Kickstart	Ahmedabad
08:00 UTC+5:30		Report	Kioko Elizabeth Katungwa 33'; Devneta Roy 35'; Laishram Bibicha Devi 43'; Nagarkote 52'; Limbu 66'	Stadium: Transstadia; Attendance: 100; Referee: Rachana Hasmukh Kamani; Player of the Match: Astam Oraon (Kickstart)

7 May 2023	Sethu	5–0	CRPF	Ahmedabad
08:00 UTC+5:30	Kajol D'Souza 41'; Sikobe 47'; Purnima Kumari 51'; Ivy Faith Atieno 87'; Pisda 90+10'	Report		Stadium: Shahibaug Police Stadium; Attendance: 0 Referee: Sen Hangma Subba; Player of the Match: Muskan Subba (Sethu)

7 May 2023	Eastern Sporting Union	4–1	Churchill Brothers	Ahmedabad
16:30 UTC+5:30	Kamala Devi 43'; Rinaroy Devi 45+3'; Lhingneilam Kipgen 45+6'; Prameshwori Devi 66'	Report	Alisha Tavares 17'	Stadium: Transstadia; Attendance: 50; Referee: Pooja S. Player of the Match: Kamala Devi (Eastern Sporting Union)

7 May 2023	Odisha	5–0	Lords FA	Ahmedabad
16:30 UTC+5:30	Cynthia Santos 41'; Bala Devi 45+1'; Faustina Worwornyo Akpo 63'; Malati Munda 86'; Tamang 89'	Report		Stadium: Shahibaug Police Stadium; Attendance: 80; Referee: Kanika Barman; Player of the Match: Bala Devi (Odisha)

10 May 2023	Lords FA	1–3	Churchill Brothers	Ahmedabad
08:00 UTC+5:30	Rodriguez 53' (pen.)	Report	Riya Sharma 43'; Saniya 79', 90+3'	Stadium: Shahibaug Police Stadium; Attendance: 70; Referee: Neetu Rana; Player of the Match: Saniya (Churchill Brothers)

10 May 2023	CRPF	0–1	Eastern Sporting Union	Ahmedabad
08:00 UTC+5:30		Report	Prameshwori Devi 52'	Stadium: Transstadia; Attendance: 100; Referee: Sen Hangma Subba; Player of the Match: Prameshwori Devi (Eastern Sporting Union)

10 May 2023	Celtic Queens	0–3	Odisha	Ahmedabad
16:30 UTC+5:30		Report	Faustina Worwornyo Akpo 3'; Bannya Kabiraj 45+2'; Lynda Kom 90+2'	Stadium: Shahibaug Police Stadium; Attendance: 10; Referee: Kumari Nandita; Player of the Match: Anju Tamang (Odisha)

10 May 2023	Kickstart	0–0	Sethu	Ahmedabad
16:30 UTC+5:30		Report		Stadium: Transstadia; Attendance: 30; Referee: Snigdha Mondal; Player of the Match: Laishram Bibicha Devi (Kickstart)

13 May 2023	CRPF	0–9	Kickstart	Ahmedabad
08:00 UTC+5:30		Report	Limbu 2', 28'; Laishram Bibicha Devi 5', 34'; Sushmita Lepcha 24'; Oraon 56'; Tanu 72' (o.g.); Chhibber 88'; Laishram Rejiya Devi 90+1'	Stadium: Shahibaug Police Stadium; Attendance: 60; Referee: Kumari Nandita; Player of the Match: Laishram Bibicha Devi (Kickstart)

13 May 2023	Churchill Brothers	1–2	Celtic Queens	Ahmedabad
08:00 UTC+5:30	Pushpa Parab 80'	Report	Aleena Tony 27'; Mangpineng Khongsai 45+1'	Stadium: Transstadia; Attendance: 25; Referee: Harsha Saini; Player of the Match: Kayenpaibam Anju Chanu (Celtic Queens)

13 May 2023	Eastern Sporting Union	3–2	Lords FA	Ahmedabad
16:30 UTC+5:30	Chandam Anjali Devi 23'; Heirangkhongjam Linda Chanu 25'; Lhingneilam Kipgen 33'	Report	Arya More 15', 20'	Stadium: Transstadia; Attendance: 100; Referee: G. Ruba Devi; Player of the Match: Lhingneilam Kipgen (Eastern Sporting Union)

13 May 2023	Sethu	0–0	Odisha	Ahmedabad
16:30 UTC+5:30		Report		Stadium: Shahibaug Police Stadium; Attendance: 100; Referee: Monika Jana; Player of the Match: Jasoda Munda (Odisha)

== Knockout stage ==
=== Bracket ===
Quarter-finals
B2	Kickstart	2
A4	HOPS	1
B1	Sethu	9
A3	East Bengal	0
A2	Sports Odisha	1 (2)
B4	Eastern Sporting Union	1 (4)
A1	Gokulam Kerala	1 (3)
B3	Odisha	1 (0)

Semi-finals
QF1	Kickstart	2
QF3	Sethu	0
QF2	Eastern Sporting Union	1
QF4	Gokulam Kerala	5

Final
SF1	Kickstart	0
SF2	Gokulam Kerala	5

=== Quarter-finals ===
16 May 2023	Kickstart	2–1	HOPS	Ahmedabad
08:00 UTC+5:30	Pakkirisamy 17'; Kioko Elizabeth Katungwa 90+1'	Report	Renu 62'	Stadium: Transstadia; Attendance: 50; Referee: G. Ruba Devi; Player of the Match: Dalima Chhibber (Kickstart)

16 May 2023	Sports Odisha	1–1 (2–4 p)	Eastern Sporting Union	Ahmedabad
08:00 UTC+5:30	Manisha Naik 80'	Report	Lhingdeikim 67'	Stadium: Shahibaug Police Stadium; Attendance: 100; Referee: Rachana Hasmukh Kamani; Player of the Match: Lhingneikim (Eastern Sporting Union)
	Penalties
	Ritu Devi (penalty scored); Poonam (penalty missed); Poonam (penalty missed); Khumukcham Sanamija Chanu (penalty scored)		(penalty scored) Phanjoubam Nirmala Devi; (penalty scored) Kangabam Anita Devi; (penalty scored) Kamala Devi; (penalty scored) Prameshwori Devi

16 May 2023	Sethu	9–0	East Bengal	Ahmedabad
17:00 UTC+5:30	Narzary 13', 21', 50', 72', 78', 90+2'; D'Souza 34'; Priyangka Devi 45+1'; Ivy Faith Atieno 90+8'	Report		Stadium: Shahibaug Police Stadium; Attendance: 100; Referee: Phurki Lhamu Bhutia; Player of the Match: Apurna Narzary (Sethu)

16 May 2023	Gokulam Kerala	1–1 (3–0 p)	Odisha	Ahmedabad
17:00 UTC+5:30	Roja Devi 45+4'	Report	Bala Devi 2'	Stadium: Transstadia; Attendance: 50; Referee: Kanika Barman; Player of the Match: Beatrice Ntiwaa Nketia (Gokulam Kerala)
	Penalties
	Ashalata Devi (penalty scored); Indumathi (penalty scored); Bhandari (penalty scored)		(penalty missed) Tamang; (penalty missed) Bala Devi; (penalty missed) Xaxa

=== Semi-finals ===
19 May 2023	Kickstart	2–0	Sethu	Ahmedabad
17:00 UTC+5:30	Kioko Elizabeth Katungwa 11'; Limbu 45+5'	Report		Stadium: Transstadia; Attendance: 50; Referee: Phurki Lhamu Bhutia; Player of the Match: W. Linthoingambi Devi (Kickstart)

19 May 2023	Eastern Sporting Union	1–5	Gokulam Kerala	Ahmedabad
20:00 UTC+5:30	Kamala Devi 18'	Report	Indumathi 31' (pen.), 70'; Bhandari 45+3', 90+5'; Adjei 55'	Stadium: Transstadia; Attendance: 50; Referee: G. Ruba Devi; Player of the Match: Indumathi Kathiresan (Gokulam Kerala)

=== Final ===
21 May 2023	Kickstart	0–5	Gokulam Kerala	Ahmedabad
18:00 UTC+5:30		Report	Bhandari 5'; Sandhiya 22', 52'; Indumathi 37' (pen.); Roja Devi 80'	Stadium: Transstadia; Attendance: 400; Referee: Kanika Barman; Player of the Match: Sabitra Bhandari (Gokulam Kerala)

== Season statistics ==
=== Top scorers ===
Rank	Player	Club	Goals
1	(Nepal) Sabitra Bhandari	Gokulam Kerala	29
2	(India) Kajol D'Souza	Sethu	10
3	(India) Indumathi Kathiresan	Gokulam Kerala	9
3	(India) Sandhiya Ranganathan	Gokulam Kerala	9
5	(Philippines) Camille Rodriguez	Lords FA	8
6	(Kenya) Kioko Elizabeth Katungwa	Kickstart	7
6	(Nepal) Saru Limbu	Kickstart	7
6	(India) Apurna Narzary	Sethu	7
9	(India) Laishram Bibicha Devi	Kickstart	6
9	(India) Bala Devi	Odisha	6
Source: The AIFF

=== Hat-tricks ===
Player	For	Against	Result	Date
(Nepal) Sabitra Bhandari	Gokulam Kerala	East Bengal	2–8 (A)	26 April 2023
(Philippines) Camille Rodriguez	Lords FA	Celtic Queens	4–0 (H)	27 April 2023
(India) Kajol D'Souza	Sethu	Churchill Brothers	6–0 (A)	28 April 2023
(Nepal) Sabitra Bhandari	Gokulam Kerala	Sports Odisha	8–1 (H)	29 April 2023
(India) Kaviya Pakkirisamy	Kickstart	Churchill Brothers	10–0 (H)	3 May 2023
(India) Sandhiya Ranganathan	Gokulam Kerala	Kahaani	14–1 (H)	6 May 2023
(Nepal) Sabitra Bhandari	Gokulam Kerala	Kahaani	14–1 (H)	6 May 2023
(Nepal) Sabitra Bhandari	Gokulam Kerala	Mata Rukmani	9–0 (A)	9 May 2023
(Nepal) Sabitra Bhandari	Gokulam Kerala	Mumbai Knights	11–1 (H)	12 May 2023
(India) Apurna Narzary	Sethu	East Bengal	9–0 (H)	16 May 2023

Notes

- (H) – Home team
- (A) – Away team

=== Clean sheets ===
Rank	Player	Club	Clean sheets
1	(India) Maibam Linthoingambi Devi	Kickstart	6
1	(Nepal) Anjila Tumbapo Subba	Sethu	6
3	(Malaysia) Nurul Azurin Mazlan	Misaka United	5
4	(India) Shreya Hooda	Odisha	4
5	(India) Elangbam Panthoi Chanu	Eastern Sporting Union	3
5	(Ghana) Beatrice Ntiwaa Nketia	Gokulam Kerala	3
5	(India) Anshika	HOPS	3

== Awards ==
=== Match awards ===
Player of the Match
Match No.	Player	Club	Match No.	Player	Club	Match No.	Player	Club
Match 1	(India) Lalrinmuani	Kickstart	Match 22	(Kenya) Ivy Faith Atieno	Sethu	Match 43	(Nepal) Sabitra Bhandari	Gokulam Kerala
Match 2	(India) Anju	Sports Odisha	Match 23	(India) Kaviya Pakkirisamy	Kickstart	Match 44	(India) Neha	HOPS
Match 3	(India) Mansi Anant Samre	Mumbai Knights	Match 24	(India) Neha Mann	CRPF	Match 45	(India) Saniya	Churchill Brothers
Match 4	(Nepal) Sabitra Bhandari	Gokulam Kerala	Match 25	(India) Rimpa Haldar	East Bengal	Match 46	(India) Prameshwori Devi	Eastern Sporting Union
Match 5	(India) Mandakini Devi	Eastern Sporting Union	Match 26	(Malaysia) Nurul Azurin Mazlan	Misaka United	Match 47	(India) Anju Tamang	Odisha
Match 6	(Philippines) Camille Rodriguez	Lords FA	Match 27	(India) Manisha Naik	Sports Odisha	Match 48	(India) Laishram Bibicha Devi	Kickstart
Match 7	(India) Grace Hauhnar	Odisha	Match 28	(India) Santosh	HOPS	Match 49	(India) Aarti Banwari	Kahaani
Match 8	(India) Kajol D'Souza	Sethu	Match 29	(India) Lynda Kom	Odisha	Match 50	(India) Ratna Halder	East Bengal
Match 9	(India) Priyanka	Mumbai Knights	Match 30	(India) Priyangka Devi	Sethu	Match 51	(India) Nisilia Majaw	Misaka United
Match 10	(India) Renu Rani	HOPS	Match 31	(India) Astam Oraon	Kickstart	Match 52	(Nepal) Sabitra Bhandari	Gokulam Kerala
Match 11	(Ghana) Vivian Adjei	Gokulam Kerala	Match 32	(India) Kayenpaibam Anju Chanu	Celtic Queens	Match 53	(India) Laishram Bibicha Devi	Kickstart
Match 12	(India) Aarti Banwari	Kahaani	Match 33	(India) Sandhiya Ranganathan	Gokulam Kerala	Match 54	(India) Kayenpaibam Anju Chanu	Celtic Queens
Match 13	(India) Kamala Devi	Eastern Sporting Union	Match 34	(India) Karishma Shirvoikar	Mumbai Knights	Match 55	(India) Lhingneilam Kipgen	Eastern Sporting Union
Match 14	(Kenya) Kioko Elizabeth Katungwa	Kickstart	Match 35	(India) Renu Rani	HOPS	Match 56	(India) Jasoda Munda	Odisha
Match 15	(India) Sumati Kumari	Sethu	Match 36	(India) Sunalinda Lawren	Misaka United	Match 57	(India) Dalima Chhibber	Kickstart
Match 16	(India) Neha Mann	CRPF	Match 37	(India) Astam Oraon	Kickstart	Match 58	(India) Lhingneikim	Eastern Sporting Union
Match 17	(India) Hemam Shilky Devi	Gokulam Kerala	Match 38	(India) Muskan Subba	Sethu	Match 59	(India) Apurna Narzary	Sethu
Match 18	(India) Lavanya Upadhyay	Misaka United	Match 39	(India) Kamala Devi	Eastern Sporting Union	Match 60	(Ghana) Beatrice Ntiwaa Nketia	Gokulam Kerala
Match 19	(India) Sanfida Nongrum	Sports Odisha	Match 40	(India) Bala Devi	Odisha	Match 61	(India) W. Linthoingambi Devi	Kickstart
Match 20	(India) Rimpa Haldar	East Bengal	Match 41	(Kenya) Lucy Kwekwe Jira	Misaka United	Match 62	(India) Indumathi Kathiresan	Gokulam Kerala
Match 21	(India) Jasoda Munda	Odisha	Match 42	(India) Mousumi Murmu	East Bengal	Match 63	(Nepal) Sabitra Bhandari	Gokulam Kerala

=== Season awards ===
Award	Winner
Hero of the League	(India) Indumathi Kathiresan (Gokulam Kerala)
Top Goalscorer	(Nepal) Sabitra Bhandari (Gokulam Kerala)
Best Goalkeeper	(India) Maibam Linthoingambi Devi (Kickstart)
Best Defender	(India) K. Ngopawdi (Sethu)
Emerging Player of the League	(India) Astam Oraon (Kickstart)
