= 2023–24 Indian Women's League =

Indian Women's League
- Season: 2023–24
- Dates: 8 December 2023 – 24 March 2024
- Champions: Odisha; 1st title
- AFC Champions League: Odisha
- Matches: 42
- Goals: 122 (2.9 per match)
- Top goalscorer: Fazila Ikwaput (13 goals)
- Best goalkeeper: Shreya Hooda
- Biggest home win: Gokulam Kerala 8–0 Sports Odisha (6 January 2024)
- Biggest away win: Sports Odisha 0–5 Gokulam Kerala (3 March 2024)
- Highest scoring: Gokulam Kerala 8–0 Sports Odisha (6 January 2024)
- Longest winning run: Gokulam Kerala (7 matches)
- Longest unbeaten run: Gokulam Kerala (9 matches)
- Longest winless run: Sports Odisha (12 matches)
- Longest losing run: Sports Odisha; East Bengal (5 matches)

The 2023–24 Indian Women's League was the seventh season of the Indian Women's League, the top division women's professional football league in India. Odisha won their maiden Indian Women's League title by winning their last league match of the season.

== Format ==
The season is played in a double round-robin format, with each club playing the other twice, once at home and once away, for a total of 12 matches. It is the first IWL season to be played on a home and away basis, as so far the preceding seasons have been held at a centralised venue.

== Qualification ==
The teams were awarded direct qualification for the 2023–24 season, which qualified for the knockout round and finished in the top eight positions in the 2022–23 season. Originally 8 teams qualified for the season, but Eastern Sporting Union didn't communicate with AIFF on their participation and thus the League Committee decided to continue with the remaining 7 teams for the season.

| Club | State/Region | Qualifying method |
2022–23 Indian Women's League
| Gokulam Kerala | Kerala | Champions |
| Kickstart | Karnataka | Runners-up |
| Sethu | Tamil Nadu | Semi-finalists |
| HOPS | Delhi | Quarter-finalists |
| Sports Odisha | Odisha | Quarter-finalists |
| East Bengal | West Bengal | Quarter-finalists |
| Odisha | Odisha | Quarter-finalists |

== Clubs ==
=== Stadiums and locations ===
Locations of the Indian Women's League clubs

| Club | City | State/Region | Stadium | Capacity |
|---|---|---|---|---|
| East Bengal | Kolkata | West Bengal | East Bengal Ground | 23,500 |
| Gokulam Kerala | Kozhikode | Kerala | EMS Corporation Stadium | 50,000 |
| HOPS | New Delhi | Delhi | Ambedkar Stadium | 15,000 |
| Kickstart | Bengaluru | Karnataka | Bangalore Football Stadium | 8,400 |
| Odisha | Bhubaneswar | Odisha | Kalinga Stadium | 15,000 |
| Odisha | Bhubaneswar | Odisha | Bhubaneswar FA Ground | 1,000 |
| Odisha | Bhubaneswar | Odisha | Capital Football Arena | 1,500 |
| Sethu | Madurai | Tamil Nadu | Tilak Maidan (Note: The club is based in Tamil Nadu but will play its home games in Goa for the 2023–24 season due to the unavailability of stadiums.) | 5,000 |
| Sports Odisha | Bhubaneswar | Odisha | Capital Football Arena | 1,500 |

=== Personnel and sponsorships ===
| Team | Head coach | Captain | Kit manufacturer | Shirt sponsor |
|---|---|---|---|---|
| East Bengal | (India) Dipankar Biswas | (India) Trisha Mallick | Trak Only | Emami |
| Gokulam Kerala | (India) Anthony Andrews | (India) Grace Dangmei | Do's | CSB Bank |
| HOPS | (India) Om Prakash Chhibber | (India) Anushka Samuel | | Dharam Foundation |
| Kickstart | (India) Langam Chaoba Devi | (India) Dalima Chhibber | Sweat | Haier |
| Odisha | (India) Crispin Chettri | (India) Manisa Panna | Trak Only | Odisha Tourism |
| Sethu | (India) Kanan Priolkar | (Nepal) Anjila Tumbapo Subba | Hummel | Everrenew |
| Sports Odisha | (India) Paromita Sit | (India) Munica Minz | Nivia Sports | Odisha Tourism |

== Foreign players ==
Teams allowed to register maximum of three foreign players. Only two can be part of the starting lineup.

Players name in bold indicates that the player was registered during the mid-season transfer window.

| Club | Player 1 | Player 2 | Player 3 | Former player(s) |
|---|---|---|---|---|
| East Bengal | (Bangladesh) **Sanjida Akhter** | — | — | — |
| Gokulam Kerala | (Ghana) Beatrice Ntiwaa Nketia | (Kenya) Phoeby Okech | (Uganda) **Fazila Ikwaput** | (Ghana) Veronica Appiah |
| HOPS | (Ghana) Gladys Amfobea | (Ghana) Fredrica Torkudzor | — | — |
| Kickstart | (Nepal) Dipa Shahi | (Bangladesh) **Sabina Khatun** | (Nepal) **Anita K.C.** | (Nepal) Preeti Rai |
| Odisha | (Myanmar) Win Theingi Tun | (Philippines) **Shelah Cadag** | — | (England) **Klesha Rosa Darroux** |
| Sethu | (Nepal) Anjila Tumbapo Subba | (Nepal) Gita Rana | (Kenya) Bertha Adhiambo Omita | — |
| Sports Odisha | (Nepal) Rashmi Kumari Ghising | (Nepal) Amrita Jaishi | — | — |

- Replaced after mid-season window due to injury.

== League table ==
| Pos | Team | Pld | W | D | L | GF | GA | GD | Pts | Qualification |
|---|---|---|---|---|---|---|---|---|---|---|
| 1 | Odisha (C) | 12 | 10 | 1 | 1 | 31 | 4 | +27 | 31 | Qualification for the Champions League preliminary stage |
| 2 | Gokulam Kerala | 12 | 9 | 2 | 1 | 33 | 5 | +28 | 29 | |
| 3 | Kickstart | 12 | 6 | 3 | 3 | 16 | 18 | −2 | 21 | |
| 4 | Sethu | 12 | 5 | 2 | 5 | 16 | 14 | +2 | 17 | |
| 5 | HOPS | 12 | 5 | 1 | 6 | 15 | 19 | −4 | 16 | |
| 6 | East Bengal | 12 | 1 | 1 | 10 | 8 | 31 | −23 | 4 | |
| 7 | Sports Odisha | 12 | 0 | 2 | 10 | 3 | 31 | −28 | 2 | |

Source: AIFF
Rules for classification: 1) points; 2) head-to-head points; 3) head-to-head goal difference; 4) goal difference; 5) number of goals scored; 6) drawing of lots
(C) Champions

== Results ==
=== Fixtures and results ===
| Home \ Away | EAB | GOK | HOP | KFC | OFC | SFC | SPO |
|---|---|---|---|---|---|---|---|
| East Bengal | | 0–4 | 0–1 | 1–3 | 1–4 | 2–4 | 0–0 |
| Gokulam Kerala | 5–1 | | 5–1 | 0–0 | 2–1 | 0–0 | 8–0 |
| HOPS | 3–0 | 0–1 | | 0–3 | 0–3 | 2–1 | 1–0 |
| Kickstart | 3–1 | 0–2 | 1–5 | | 0–0 | 2–2 | 2–1 |
| Odisha | 2–0 | 2–0 | 1–0 | 6–0 | | 1–0 | 3–1 |
| Sethu | 2–0 | 0–1 | 3–1 | 0–1 | 0–4 | | 1–0 |
| Sports Odisha | 0–2 | 0–5 | 1–1 | 0–1 | 0–4 | 0–3 | |

Source: AIFF
Legend: Blue = home team win; Yellow = draw; Red = away team win.

=== Results by match ===
The table lists the results of the teams after each match.

| Match | 1 | 2 | 3 | 4 | 5 | 6 | 7 | 8 | 9 | 10 | 11 | 12 |
|---|---|---|---|---|---|---|---|---|---|---|---|---|
| East Bengal | W | L | L | L | L | L | D | L | L | L | L | L |
| Gokulam Kerala | D | W | L | W | D | W | W | W | W | W | W | W |
| HOPS | L | L | W | L | D | W | W | L | W | L | W | L |
| Kickstart | W | W | W | D | W | D | L | W | W | L | D | L |
| Odisha | W | W | W | W | W | D | W | L | W | W | W | W |
| Sethu | D | W | L | W | L | L | L | W | L | W | D | W |
| Sports Odisha | L | L | L | L | L | D | D | L | L | L | L | L |

Source: AIFF
W = Win; D = Draw; L = Loss

=== Positions by round ===
The table lists the positions of teams after each round mentioned in official fixtures.

| Team ╲ Round | 1 | 2 | 3 | 4 | 5 | 6 | 7 | 8 | 9 | 10 | 11 | 12 | 13 | 14 |
|---|---|---|---|---|---|---|---|---|---|---|---|---|---|---|
| East Bengal | 2 | 4 | 5 | 5 | 5 | 6 | 6 | 6 | 6 | 6 | 6 | 6 | 6 | 6 |
| Gokulam Kerala | 3 | 2 | 4 | 3 | 3 | 3 | 3 | 2 | 2 | 1 | 1 | 1 | 2 | 2 |
| HOPS | 7 | 6 | 6 | 6 | 6 | 5 | 5 | 4 | 4 | 5 | 4 | 4 | 4 | 5 |
| Kickstart | 1 | 1 | 1 | 2 | 2 | 2 | 2 | 3 | 3 | 2 | 3 | 3 | 3 | 3 |
| Odisha | 5 | 3 | 2 | 1 | 1 | 1 | 1 | 1 | 1 | 3 | 2 | 2 | 1 | 1 |
| Sethu | 4 | 5 | 3 | 4 | 4 | 4 | 4 | 5 | 5 | 4 | 5 | 5 | 5 | 4 |
| Sports Odisha | 6 | 7 | 7 | 7 | 7 | 7 | 7 | 7 | 7 | 7 | 7 | 7 | 7 | 7 |

| Champions |

Source: AIFF

== Matches ==
- All times are in IST (UTC+5:30).

=== Round 1 ===
| 8 December 2023 | **Gokulam Kerala** | **0–0** | **Sethu** | Kozhikode |
| 15:30 | | Report | | Stadium: EMS Corporation Stadium; Attendance: 800; Referee: Kanika Barman; Player of the Match: Anjila Tumbapo Subba (Sethu) |

| 9 December 2023 | **HOPS** | **0–3** | **Kickstart** | Delhi |
| 13:00 | | Report | Karishma 13'; S. Lepcha 24'; Pakpi Devi 56' | Stadium: Dr. Ambedkar Stadium; Attendance: 500; Referee: Ranjita Devi Tekcham; Player of the Match: Karishma Shirvoikar (Kickstart) |

| 10 December 2023 | **Sports Odisha** | **0–2** | **East Bengal** | Bhubaneswar |
| 15:00 | | Report | Sibani Devi 2'; Margaret Devi 59' | Stadium: Capital Football Arena; Attendance: 270; Referee: Pooja S. Player of the Match: Margaret Devi (East Bengal) |

=== Round 2 ===
| 14 December 2023 | **HOPS** | **0–1** | **Gokulam Kerala** | Delhi |
| 13:00 | | Report | Tamang 45+1' | Stadium: Dr. Ambedkar Stadium; Attendance: 1000; Referee: Rachana Kamani; Player of the Match: Anju Tamang (Gokulam Kerala) |

| 15 December 2023 | **Sports Odisha** | **0–4** | **Odisha** | Bhubaneswar |
| 15:00 | | Report | Panna 9'; Win Theingi Tun 56', 57'; M. Munda 87' | Stadium: Capital Football Arena; Attendance: 250; Referee: Neetu Rana; Player of the Match: Manisa Panna (Odisha) |

| 16 December 2023 | **Kickstart** | **3–1** | **East Bengal** | Bengaluru |
| 15:30 | Karishma 41', 69', 90' | Report | Sulanjana Raul 86' | Stadium: Bangalore Football Stadium; Attendance: 250; Referee: Usha; Player of the Match: Karishma Shirvoikar (Kickstart) |

=== Round 3 ===
| 20 December 2023 | **Odisha** | **2–0** | **Gokulam Kerala** | Bhubaneswar |
| 14:00 | Pyari Xaxa 32'; Lynda Kom Serto 83' | Report | | Stadium: Kalinga Stadium; Attendance: 100; Referee: Ruba Devi G. Player of the Match: Sanju Yadav (Odisha) |

| 21 December 2023 | **Kickstart** | **2–1** | **Sports Odisha** | Bengaluru |
| 15:30 | Karishma 13', 33' | Report | R. Ghising 27' (pen.) | Stadium: Bangalore Football Stadium; Attendance: 150; Referee: Mahi Tudu; Player of the Match: Karishma Shirvoikar (Kickstart) |

| 23 December 2023 | **East Bengal** | **2–4** | **Sethu** | Kolkata |
| 14:00 | Sibani Devi 60'; Sulanjana Raul 82' | Report | D'Souza 38'; Priyangka Devi 66', 79'; Kaviya 84' | Stadium: East Bengal Ground; Attendance: 250; Referee: Neetu Rana; Player of the Match: Naorem Priyangka Devi (Sethu) |

=== Round 4 ===
| 4 January 2024 | **East Bengal** | **0–1** | **HOPS** | Kolkata |
| 14:00 | | Report | Gladys Amfobea 52' | Stadium: East Bengal Ground; Attendance: 312; Referee: Sen Hangma Subba; Player of the Match: Fredrica Torkudzor (HOPS) |

| 5 January 2024 | **Odisha** | **1–0** | **Sethu** | Bhubaneswar |
| 14:00 | Indumathi 66' (pen.) | Report | | Stadium: Bhubaneswar Football Academy; Attendance: 30; Referee: Kusum Mandi; Player of the Match: Indumathi Kathiresan (Odisha) |

| 6 January 2024 | **Gokulam Kerala** | **8–0** | **Sports Odisha** | Kozhikode |
| 15:30 | Sandhiya 4'; Tamang 12', 90+4'; Roja Devi 23'; Ikwaput 33', 38'; Guguloth 45', 50' | Report | | Stadium: EMS Corporation Stadium; Attendance: 100; Referee: Usha; Player of the Match: Sandhiya Ranganathan (Gokulam Kerala) |

=== Round 5 ===
| 10 January 2024 | **Odisha** | **1–0** | **HOPS** | Bhubaneswar |
| 14:00 | Xaxa 44' | Report | | Stadium: Bhubaneswar Football Academy; Attendance: 30; Referee: Kanika Barman; Player of the Match: Indumathi Kathiresan (Odisha) |

| 11 January 2024 | **Sethu** | **1–0** | **Sports Odisha** | Vasco da Gama |
| 15:30 | Kaviya 50' | Report | | Stadium: Tilak Maidan; Attendance: 200; Referee: Ranjita Devi Tekcham; Player of the Match: Kaviya Pakkirisamy (Sethu) |

| 12 January 2024 | **Gokulam Kerala** | **0–0** | **Kickstart** | Kozhikode |
| 15:30 | | Report | | Stadium: EMS Corporation Stadium; Player of the Match: Karishma Shirvoikar (Kickstart) |

=== Round 6 ===
| 16 January 2024 | **Sports Odisha** | **1–1** | **HOPS** | Bhubaneswar |
| 15:00 | Manisha Naik 84' | Report | Fredrica Torkudzor 67' | Stadium: Capital Football Arena; Attendance: 100; Referee: Ranjita Devi Tekcham; Player of the Match: Fredrica Torkudzor (HOPS) |

| 17 January 2024 | **Sethu** | **0–1** | **Kickstart** | Vasco da Gama |
| 15:30 | | Report | Laishram Bibicha Devi 77' | Stadium: Tilak Maidan; Attendance: 200; Referee: Rachana Hasmukh Kamani; Player of the Match: Laishram Bibicha Devi (Kickstart) |

| 18 January 2024 | **East Bengal** | **1–4** | **Odisha** | Kolkata |
| 14:00 | Manisa Panna 63' (o.g.) | Report | Juli Kishan 6'; Pyari Xaxa 22'; Win Theingi Tun 26'; Malati Munda 90+4' | Stadium: East Bengal Ground; Attendance: 250; Referee: Ranjita Devi Tekcham; Player of the Match: Pyari Xaxa (Odisha) |

=== Round 7 ===
| 22 January 2024 | **HOPS** | **2–1** | **Sethu** | Delhi |
| 11:00 | Aarti 75'; Fredrica Torkudzor 90+2' | Report | Kaviya Pakkirisamy 29' | Stadium: Dr. Ambedkar Stadium; Attendance: 0 Referee: Kusum Mandi; Player of the Match: Fredrica Torkudzor (HOPS) |

| 23 January 2024 | **East Bengal** | **0–4** | **Gokulam Kerala** | Kolkata |
| 14:00 | | Report | Sandhiya Ranganathan 7'; Fazila Ikwaput 10', 14', 48' | Stadium: East Bengal Ground; Attendance: 100; Referee: Pooja S. Player of the Match: Fazila Ikwaput (Gokulam Kerala) |

| 24 January 2024 | **Kickstart** | **0–0** | **Odisha** | Bengaluru |
| 15:30 | | Report | | Stadium: Bangalore Football Stadium; Attendance: 100; Referee: Ruba Devi G. Player of the Match: Sonia Marak (Kickstart) |

=== Round 8 ===
| 28 January 2024 | **Sethu** | **0–1** | **Gokulam Kerala** | Vasco da Gama |
| 15:30 | | Report | Sandhiya 2' | Stadium: Tilak Maidan; Attendance: 200; Referee: Mahi Tudu; Player of the Match: Sandhiya Ranganathan (Gokulam Kerala) |

| 29 January 2024 | **Kickstart** | **1–5** | **HOPS** | Bengaluru |
| 15:30 | Karishma 5' | Report | Fredrica Torkudzor 28', 59', 90+5'; Shailja 39'; Amfobea 83' | Stadium: Bangalore Football Stadium; Attendance: 150; Referee: Sen Hangma Subba; Player of the Match: Fredrica Torkudzor (HOPS) |

| 30 January 2024 | **East Bengal** | **0–0** | **Sports Odisha** | Kolkata |
| 14:00 | | Report | | Stadium: East Bengal Ground; Attendance: 300; Referee: Rachana Hasmukh Kamani; Player of the Match: Michel Castanha (East Bengal) |

=== Round 9 ===
| 3 February 2024 | **Gokulam Kerala** | **5–1** | **HOPS** | Kozhikode |
| 15:30 | Guguloth 37', 45', 63'; Tamang 42', 75' | Report | Fredrica Torkudzor 90+5' (pen.) | Stadium: EMS Corporation Stadium; Attendance: 50; Referee: Kusum Mandi; Player of the Match: Soumya Guguloth (Gokulam Kerala) |

| 4 February 2024 | **Odisha** | **3–1** | **Sports Odisha** | Bhubaneswar |
| 15:00 | Lynda Kom 8'; Win Theingi Tun 45+3', 50' | Report | Manisha Naik 68' | Stadium: Capital Football Arena; Attendance: 40; Referee: Ranjita Devi Tekcham; Player of the Match: Win Theingi Tun (Odisha) |

| 5 February 2024 | **East Bengal** | **1–3** | **Kickstart** | Kolkata |
| 14:00 | Akhter 48' | Report | Aruna Bag 1'; Sonia Marak 30'; Shirvoikar 56' | Stadium: East Bengal Ground; Attendance: 200; Referee: Ruba Devi G Player of the Match: Aruna Bag (Kickstart) |

=== Round 10 ===
| 9 February 2024 | **Gokulam Kerala** | **2–1** | **Odisha** | Kozhikode |
| 15:30 | Ikwaput 15', 45+3' | Report | Indumathi 1' | Stadium: EMS Corporation Stadium; Attendance: 250; Referee: Neetu Rana; Player of the Match: Fazila Ikwaput (Gokulam Kerala) |

| 10 February 2024 | **Sports Odisha** | **0–1** | **Kickstart** | Bhubaneswar |
| 15:00 | | Report | Sonia Marak 13' | Stadium: Capital Football Arena; Attendance: 100; Referee: Usha; Player of the Match: Sonia Marak (Kickstart) |

| 11 February 2024 | **Sethu** | **2–0** | **East Bengal** | Vasco da Gama |
| 15:30 | D'Souza 7' (pen.), 83' | Report | | Stadium: Tilak Maidan; Attendance: 100; Referee: Pooja S Player of the Match: Kajol D'Souza (Sethu) |

=== Round 11 ===
| 1 March 2024 | **HOPS** | **3–0** | **East Bengal** | Delhi |
| 14:00 | Pooja 26'; Gladys Amfobea 40'; Fredrica Torkudzor 89' | Report | | Stadium: Dr. Ambedkar Stadium; Attendance: 200; Referee: Rachana Hasmukh Kamani; Player of the Match: Fredrica Torkudzor (HOPS) |

| 2 March 2024 | **Sethu** | **0–4** | **Odisha** | Vasco da Gama |
| 15:30 | | Report | Win Theingi Tun 4'; Indumathi Kathiresan 23'; Pyari Xaxa 60', 78' | Stadium: Tilak Maidan; Attendance: 100; Referee: Kanika Barman; Player of the Match: Pyari Xaxa (Odisha) |

| 3 March 2024 | **Sports Odisha** | **0–5** | **Gokulam Kerala** | Bhubaneswar |
| 15:00 | | Report | Sandhiya Ranganathan 3'; Fazila Ikwaput 44', 83', 84', 85' | Stadium: Capital Football Arena; Attendance: 150; Referee: Pooja S Player of the Match: Fazila Ikwaput (Gokulam Kerala) |

=== Round 12 ===
| 8 March 2024 | **HOPS** | **0–3** | **Odisha** | Delhi |
| 15:30 | | Report | Indumathi Kathiresan 20' (pen.); Pyari Xaxa 46'; Lynda Kom 90' | Stadium: Dr. Ambedkar Stadium; Attendance: 100; Referee: Ruba Devi G Player of the Match: Pyari Xaxa (Odisha) |

| 9 March 2024 | **Sports Odisha** | **0–3** | **Sethu** | Bhubaneswar |
| 15:00 | | Report | Malavika P 19'; Kaviya Pakkirisamy 27'; Kajol D'Souza 66' | Stadium: Capital Football Arena; Attendance: 100; Referee: Mahi Tudu; Player of the Match: Kaviya Pakkirisamy (Sethu) |

| 10 March 2024 | **Kickstart** | **0–2** | **Gokulam Kerala** | Bengaluru |
| 15:30 | | Report | Fazila Ikwaput 19'; Sandhiya Ranganathan 43' | Stadium: Bangalore Football Stadium; Attendance: 100; Referee: Usha; Player of the Match: Fazila Ikwaput (Gokulam Kerala) |

=== Round 13 ===
| 15 March 2024 | **HOPS** | **1–0** | **Sports Odisha** | Delhi |
| 15:30 | Pooja 32' | Report | | Stadium: Dr. Ambedkar Stadium; Attendance: 43; Referee: Kanika Barman; Player of the Match: Anshika (HOPS) |

| 16 March 2024 | **Kickstart** | **2–2** | **Sethu** | Bengaluru |
| 15:30 | Shanglakpam Banti Sharma 78'; Sushmita Jadhav 83' | Report | Lisham Babina Devi 2'; Kaviya Pakkirisamy 4' | Stadium: Bangalore Football Stadium; Attendance: 200; Referee: Neetu Rana; Player of the Match: Shanglakpam Banti Sharma (Kickstart) |

| 17 March 2024 | **Odisha** | **2–0** | **East Bengal** | Bhubaneswar |
| 15:30 | Indumathi Kathiresan 70'; Win Theingi Tun 90+1' | Report | | Stadium: Kalinga Stadium; Attendance: 100; Referee: Sen Hangma Subba; Player of the Match: Sanju Yadav (Odisha) |

=== Round 14 ===
| 22 March 2024 | **Sethu** | **3–1** | **HOPS** | Vasco da Gama |
| 15:30 | Kaviya Pakkirisamy 30'; Karen Estrocio 60'; Lisham Babina Devi 68' | Report | Neha 20' | Stadium: Tilak Maidan; Attendance: 100; Referee: Ranjita Devi Tekcham; Player of the Match: Karen Estrocio (Sethu) |

| 24 March 2024 | **Gokulam Kerala** | **5–1** | **East Bengal** | Kozhikode |
| 15:30 | Soumya Guguloth 20', 48'; Sandhiya Ranganathan 34'; Fazila Ikwaput 61'; Muskan Subba 86' | Report | Sulanjana Raul 64' | Stadium: EMS Corporation Stadium; Attendance: 300; Referee: Ruba Devi G Player of the Match: Soumya Guguloth (Gokulam Kerala) |

| 24 March 2024 | **Odisha** | **6–0** | **Kickstart** | Bhubaneswar |
| 15:30 | Lynda Kom 11', 66', 77'; Pyari Xaxa 13', 22'; Karthika Angamuthu 58' | Report | | Stadium: Kalinga Stadium; Attendance: 300; Referee: Kanika Barman; Player of the Match: Lynda Kom (Odisha) |

== Season statistics ==
As of 24 March 2024

=== Top scorers ===
| Rank | Player | Club | Goals |
|---|---|---|---|
| 1 | (Uganda) Fazila Ikwaput | Gokulam Kerala | 13 |
| 2 | (India) Karishma Shirvoikar | Kickstart | 8 |
| 2 | (India) Pyari Xaxa | Odisha | 8 |
| 4 | (Ghana) Fredrica Torkudzor | HOPS | 7 |
| 4 | (Myanmar) Win Theingi Tun | Odisha | 7 |
| 4 | (India) Soumya Guguloth | Gokulam Kerala | 7 |
| 7 | (India) Kaviya Pakkirisamy | Sethu | 6 |
| 7 | (India) Sandhiya Ranganathan | Gokulam Kerala | 6 |
| 7 | (India) Lynda Kom | Odisha | 6 |
| 10 | (India) Anju Tamang | Gokulam Kerala | 5 |
| 10 | (India) Indumathi Kathiresan | Odisha | 5 |
| 12 | (India) Kajol D'Souza | Sethu | 4 |
| 13 | (Ghana) Gladys Amfobea | HOPS | 3 |
| 13 | (India) Sulanjana Raul | East Bengal | 3 |
| 15 | (India) Naorem Priyangka Devi | Sethu | 2 |
| 15 | (India) Sibani Devi Nongmeikapam | East Bengal | 2 |
| 15 | (India) Malati Munda | Odisha | 2 |
| 15 | (India) Manisha Naik | Sports Odisha | 2 |
| 15 | (India) Sonia Marak | Kiskstart | 2 |
| 15 | (India) Pooja | HOPS | 2 |
| 15 | (India) Lisham Babina Devi | Sethu | 2 |
| 22 | (India) Kshetrimayum Margaret Devi | East Bengal | 1 |
| 22 | (India) Manisa Panna | Odisha | 1 |
| 22 | (Nepal) Rashmi Kumari Ghising | Sports Odisha | 1 |
| 22 | (India) Sushmita Lepcha | Kiskstart | 1 |
| 22 | (India) Yumlembam Pakpi Devi | Kiskstart | 1 |
| 22 | (India) Asem Roja Devi | Gokulam Kerala | 1 |
| 22 | (India) Laishram Bibicha Devi | Kiskstart | 1 |
| 22 | (India) Juli Kishan | Odisha | 1 |
| 22 | (India) Aarti | HOPS | 1 |
| 22 | (India) Shailja | HOPS | 1 |
| 22 | (India) Aruna Bag | Kiskstart | 1 |
| 22 | (Bangladesh) Sanjida Akhter | East Bengal | 1 |
| 22 | (India) Malavika P | Sethu | 1 |
| 22 | (India) Shanglakpam Banti Sharma | Kiskstart | 1 |
| 22 | (India) Sushmita Jadhav | Kiskstart | 1 |
| 22 | (India) Karen Estrocio | Sethu | 1 |
| 22 | (India) Muskan Subba | Gokulam Kerala | 1 |
| 22 | (India) Karthika Angamuthu | Odisha | 1 |

=== Hat-tricks ===
| Player | For | Against | Result | Date |
|---|---|---|---|---|
| (India) Karishma Shirvoikar | Kickstart | East Bengal | 3–1 (H) | 16 December 2023 |
| (Uganda) Fazila Ikwaput | Gokulam Kerala | East Bengal | 4–0 (A) | 23 January 2024 |
| (Ghana) Fredrica Torkudzor | HOPS | Kickstart | 5–1 (A) | 29 January 2024 |
| (India) Soumya Guguloth | Gokulam Kerala | HOPS | 5–1 (H) | 3 February 2024 |
| (Uganda) Fazila Ikwaput | Gokulam Kerala | Sports Odisha | 5–0 (A) | 3 March 2024 |
| (India) Lynda Kom | Odisha | Kickstart | 6–0 (H) | 24 March 2024 |

Notes

- (H) – Home team
- (A) – Away team

=== Clean sheets ===
| Rank | Player | Club | Clean sheets |
|---|---|---|---|
| 1 | (India) Shreya Hooda | Odisha | 9 |
| 2 | (India) Maibam Linthoingambi Devi | Kickstart | 5 |
| 3 | (Nepal) Anjila Tumbapo Subba | Sethu | 4 |
| 4 | (India) Sowmiya Narayanasamy | Gokulam Kerala | 3 |
| 4 | (India) Anshika | HOPS | 3 |
| 4 | (Ghana) Beatrice Ntiwaa Nketia | Gokulam Kerala | 2 |
| 4 | (India) Keisham Melody Chanu | East Bengal | 2 |
| 4 | (India) Payal Basude | Gokulam Kerala | 2 |
| 7 | (India) Adrija Sarkhel | Sports Odisha | 1 |
| 7 | (India) Moirangthem Monalisha Devi | Odisha | 1 |

=== Discipline ===
==== Player ====
- Most yellow cards: **3**
  - (India) Yumlembam Pakpi Devi
  - (India) Kshetrimayum Margaret Devi
  - (India) Mamta
- Most red cards: **0**
  - None

==== Club ====
- Most yellow cards: **5**
  - Gokulam Kerala
- Most red cards: **0**
  - None

== Awards ==
=== Match awards ===
Player of the Match
| Match No. | Player | Club | Match No. | Player | Club | Match No. | Player | Club |
|---|---|---|---|---|---|---|---|---|
| 1 | (Nepal) Anjila Tumbapo Subba | Sethu | 2 | (India) Karishma Shirvoikar | Kickstart | 3 | (India) Kshetrimayum Margaret Devi | East Bengal |
| 4 | (India) Anju Tamang | Gokulam Kerala | 5 | (India) Manisa Panna | Odisha | 6 | (India) Karishma Shirvoikar | Kickstart |
| 7 | (India) Sanju Yadav | Odisha | 8 | (India) Karishma Shirvoikar | Kickstart | 9 | (India) Naorem Priyangka Devi | Sethu |
| 10 | (Ghana) Fredrica Torkudzor | HOPS | 11 | (India) Indumathi Kathiresan | Odisha | 12 | (India) Sandhiya Ranganathan | Gokulam Kerala |
| 13 | (India) Indumathi Kathiresan | Odisha | 14 | (India) Kaviya Pakkirisamy | Sethu | 15 | (India) Karishma Shirvoikar | Kickstart |
| 16 | (Ghana) Fredrica Torkudzor | HOPS | 17 | (India) Laishram Bibicha Devi | Kickstart | 18 | (India) Pyari Xaxa | Odisha |
| 19 | (Ghana) Fredrica Torkudzor | HOPS | 20 | (Uganda) Fazila Ikwaput | Gokulam Kerala | 21 | (India) Sonia Marak | Kickstart |
| 22 | (India) Sandhiya Ranganathan | Gokulam Kerala | 23 | (Ghana) Fredrica Torkudzor | HOPS | 24 | (India) Michel Castanha | East Bengal |
| 25 | (India) Soumya Guguloth | Gokulam Kerala | 26 | (Myanmar) Win Theingi Tun | Odisha | 27 | (India) Aruna Bag | Kickstart |
| 28 | (Uganda) Fazila Ikwaput | Gokulam Kerala | 29 | (India) Sonia Marak | Kickstart | 30 | (India) Kajol D'Souza | Sethu |
| 31 | (Ghana) Fredrica Torkudzor | HOPS | 32 | (India) Pyari Xaxa | Odisha | 33 | (Uganda) Fazila Ikwaput | Gokulam Kerala |
| 34 | (India) Pyari Xaxa | Odisha | 35 | (India) Kaviya Pakkirisamy | Sethu | 36 | (Uganda) Fazila Ikwaput | Gokulam Kerala |
| 37 | (India) Anshika | HOPS | 38 | (India) Shanglakpam Banti Sharma | Kickstart | 39 | (India) Sanju Yadav | Odisha |
| 40 | (India) Karen Estrocio | Sethu | 41 | (India) Soumya Guguloth | Gokulam Kerala | 42 | (India) Lynda Kom | Odisha |

=== Season awards ===
The following awards were given at the conclusion of the season:

| Award | Winner | Club | Amount |
|---|---|---|---|
| Best Striker | (Uganda) Fazila Ikwaput | Gokulam Kerala | ₹50,000 |
| Best Goalkeeper | (India) Shreya Hooda | Odisha | ₹50,000 |
| Best Defender | (India) Hemam Shilky Devi | Gokulam Kerala | ₹50,000 |
| Best Midfielder | (India) Indumathi Kathiresan | Odisha | ₹50,000 |
| Best Match Organisation | Sports Odisha | | ₹50,000 |
| Best Media Operations | Odisha | | ₹50,000 |
| Runners-up | Gokulam Kerala | | ₹500,000 |
| Champions | Odisha | | ₹1,000,000 |

== See also ==
- **Women**
  - 2023–24 Indian Women's League 2
- **Men**
  - 2023–24 Indian Super League
  - 2023–24 I-League
  - 2023–24 I-League 2
  - 2023–24 I-League 3
  - 2023 Durand Cup
  - 2024 Super Cup
