= India women's national football team results (unofficial matches) =

List of unofficial match results for the Indian women's national football team

This is a list of the India women's national football team results that, for various reasons, are not accorded the status of official International A Matches.

== Legend ==
Win Draw Loss

Till 1990s the Indian Women National Team was controlled by the Women Football Federation of India (WFFI) which was affiliated to Asian Ladies' Football Confederation (ALFC) neither of which were affiliated to AFC or FIFA for which the international matches played by the team from 1975 till 1994 were refused to be recognised by FIFA.

== 1981 ==
12 October Women's Invitational	India	0–0	(West Germany) Bergisch Gladbach	Taipei, Taiwan
		Report		Stadium: Zhongshan Soccer Stadium

13 October Women's Invitational	HJK (Finland)	5–0	India	Taipei, Taiwan
		Report		Stadium: Zhongshan Soccer Stadium

14 October Women's Invitational	India	2–2	Haiti	Taipei, Taiwan
		Report		Stadium: Zhongshan Soccer Stadium

17 October Women's Invitational	DBSS Sting SC (United States)	5–0	India	Kaohsiung, Taiwan
		Report		Stadium: National Stadium

18 October Women's Invitational	India	0–2	Taiwan B	Kaohsiung, Taiwan
		Report		Stadium: National Stadium

== 1986 ==
20 January Tien Soeharto Cup	Putri Pagilaran (Melati) (Indonesia)	2–0	India	South Jakarta, Indonesia
	Yuri Maryati 3'; Atmini 13'			Stadium: Kuningan Students' Stadium

23 January Tien Soeharto Cup	DKI Jaya (Mawar) (Indonesia)	0–8	India	South Jakarta, Indonesia
			Shukla Dutta 2', 13', 48', 59'; Kungenwari 20'; Clementina Fernandes 22'; Anita Sarkar 32', 67'	Stadium: Kuningan Students' Stadium

24 January Tien Soeharto Cup	Buana Putri (Cempaka) (Indonesia)	1–4	India	South Jakarta, Indonesia
	Nine Noventi 44'		Shukla Dutta 28', 38', 54', 55'	Stadium: Senayan Main Stadium

== 2003 ==
15 October FAS International W's Tournament	Thailand	9–0	India	Choa Chu Kang, Singapore
				Stadium: Choa Chu Kang Stadium

16 October FAS International W's Tournament	Vietnam	3–0	India	Choa Chu Kang, Singapore
				Stadium: Choa Chu Kang Stadium

== 2005 ==
2 October Vietnam Coal Tournament	Cua Ong Coal (Vietnam)	1–0	India	Cẩm Phả, Vietnam
	Le Thi Hoai Thu 33'			Stadium: Cẩm Phả Stadium

== 2013 ==
17 January Hybrid friendly	India	0–2	(Netherlands) KNVB CTO	Kolhapur, India
			Annebel ten Broeke 2'; Sylvana Tieleman 76'	Stadium: Rajarshi Shahu Stadium; Attendance: 20000

20 January Hybrid friendly	India	1–0	(Netherlands) KNVB CTO	Navi Mumbai, India
	Ashalata Devi 15'			Stadium: Fr. Agnel Stadium; Attendance: 4000

== 2014 ==
6 September Hybrid friendly	Century Park FC (China)	2–4	India	Shanghai, China
	? 60' ? 72'	Report	Bala Devi 6', 10', 34'; Premi Devi

== 2017 ==
28 July Unofficial friendly	Malaysia	2–2	India	Kuala Lumpur, Malaysia
	?	Report	Mandakini Devi; Kamala Devi

== 2018 ==
31 July Hybrid friendly	UD Alzira (Valencian Community)	1–3	India	Valencia, Spain
	60'	Report	19' Bala Devi; 51' Grace Dangmei; 56' Kamala Devi Yumnam

1 August Cotif Cup 2018	Fundación Albacete	4–1	India	Valencia, Spain
19:00 CEST	Alba Redondo 30'; Leles 42'; Miriam Costa 53'; Tomo Matsukawa 70'	Report	Kamala Devi Yumnam 19' (pen.)	Stadium: Estadi municipal Els Arcs de L'alcúdia; Attendance: 2,000; Referee: José Luis Munuera Montero FIFA (Spain)

3 August Cotif Cup 2018	India	0–5	(Valencian Community) Levante UD	Valencia, Spain
19:00 CEST		Report	Nerea Pérez Machado 25'; Jéssica Silva 27', 37'; María Alharilla 52' (pen.); Sonia Bermúdez 58'	Stadium: Estadi municipal Els Arcs de L'alcúdia; Attendance: 1,500; Referee: Guillermo Cuadra Fernández (Spain)

5 August Cotif Cup 2018	India	1–5	Morocco	Valencia, Spain
17:45 CEST	Sandhiya Ranganathan 42'	Report	Ghizlane Chebbak 49' (pen.); Najat Badri 51', 56'; Ibtissam Jraïdi 70' (pen.); Aziza Rabbah 70+3'	Stadium: Estadi municipal Els Arcs de L'alcúdia; Attendance: 1,000; Referee: Ricardo de Burgos Bengoetxea FIFA (Spain)

6 August Cotif Cup 2018	Madrid CFF (Community of Madrid)	1–0	India	Valencia, Spain
19:30 CEST	Alba Mellado 70' (pen.)	Report		Stadium: Estadi municipal Els Arcs de L'alcúdia; Attendance: 2,000; Referee: Eduardo Prieto Iglesias (Spain)

== 2019 ==
26 July Hybrid friendly	India	5–0	(Valencian Community) CF Athletico Carcer	Valencia, Spain
	Grace Dangmei; Bala Devi (pen.); Jabamani Tudu; Sanju Yadav	Report		Stadium: Estadi municipal Els Arcs de L'alcúdia

29 July Hybrid friendly	India	1–0	(Valencian Community) UD Alzira	Valencia, Spain
	Grace Dangmei	Report		Stadium: Estadi municipal Els Arcs de L'alcúdia

1 August Cotif Cup 2019	India	0–2	(Valencian Community) Villarreal CF U20	Valencia, Spain
			Sheila Gómez 9'; Nazaret Padrón 62'	Stadium: Estadi municipal Els Arcs de L'alcúdia; Attendance: 700; Referee: Iosu Galech Apezteguía (Spain)

3 August Cotif Cup 2019	India	3–1	Bolivia U19	Valencia, Spain
23:30 IST	Bala Devi 5'; Ratanbala Devi 36', 58'		Sweety Devi 2' (o.g.)	Stadium: Estadi municipal Els Arcs de L'alcúdia; Attendance: 1,000; Referee: César Soto Grado (Spain)

4 August Cotif Cup 2019	Mauritania	0–7	India	Valencia, Spain
22:15 IST			Manisha Kalyan 3'; Grace Dangmei 7', 32'; Bala Devi 27'; Ashalata Devi 51' (pen.), 63' (pen.); Daya Devi 65'	Stadium: Estadi municipal Els Arcs de L'alcúdia; Attendance: 1,500; Referee: Luis Mario Milla Alvendiz (Spain)

7 August Cotif Cup 2019	Spain U20	2–0	India	Valencia, Spain
24:00 IST	Jana 15'; Irene 64' (pen.)			Stadium: Estadi municipal Els Arcs de L'alcúdia; Attendance: 2,500; Referee: Oliver Fuente Ramos (Spain)

== 2021 ==
17 February Unofficial friendly	Serbia	2–0	India	Kargıcak, Turkey
13:00	Matić 20'; Matejić	Twitter		Stadium: Gold City Sports Complex

20 October Hybrid friendly	Hammarby IF	3–2	India	Stockholm, Sweden
	Jakobsson 36'; Amanda Sundstrom 52'; Chanu 78' (o.g.)	Report (article); Report (detailed)	Indumathi 30'; Panna 40'	Stadium: Hammarby IP

23 October Hybrid friendly	Djurgårdens IF	1–0	India	Stockholm, Sweden
	Lang 43'	Report (article); Report (detailed)		Stadium: Stockholm Olympic Stadium

15 December Hybrid friendly	India	4–0	(India) All Stars	Kochi, India
		Report		Stadium: Panampilly Nagar Ground

17 December Hybrid friendly	India	3–0	(India) All Stars	Kochi, India
		Report		Stadium: Panampilly Nagar Ground

== 2022 ==
22 June U-23 Tri-nation series	Sweden U23	1–0	India	Ängelholm, Sweden
22:30 UTC+2	Vickius 90+8'	Report		Stadium: Ängelholms IP

25 June U-23 Tri-nation series	United States U23	4–1	India	Helsingborg, Sweden
22:30 UTC+2	Bright 9'; Nighswonger 47'; Enge 74'; Cook 85'	Report	Xaxa 8'	Stadium: Laröds IP

27 June Hybrid friendly	Eskilsminne IF (Sweden)	1–3	India	Sweden
22:30 UTC+2			P. Devi 35'; Kalyan 70', 74'

== 2025 ==
29 October Unofficial friendly	India	1–1 (0–3 p)	Nepal	Gangtok, India
16:45 UTC+5:30	Guguloth 30'	Report	Ghising 45+2'	Stadium: Paljor Stadium; Referee: Meera Tamang (Bhutan)
	Penalties
	Priyadharshini (penalty missed); Santosh (penalty missed); Oraon (penalty missed)		S. Magar (penalty scored); Ghising (penalty scored); Basnet (penalty missed); Thokar (penalty scored)

30 November Hybrid friendly	Precision FC (United Arab Emirates)	1–8	India	United Arab Emirates
		Report	Lynda Kom (?); Aveka Singh (?); Sangita Basfore (?); Anju Tamang (?)

1 December Hybrid friendly	Banaat (United Arab Emirates)	1–3	India	United Arab Emirates
		Report	Aveka Singh (?); Anju Tamang (?); Manisha Kalyan (?)

== 2026 ==
18 January Unofficial friendly	Metalist 1925 Kharkiv (Ukraine)	2–0	India	Manavgat, Turkey
17:30 UTC+5:30	Lydia Zaborovets 60' (pen.); Lesia Olkhova 90+3'	Report		Stadium: Emirhan Sport Center

24 January Unofficial friendly	Schlieren (Switzerland)	1–2	India	Manavgat, Turkey
17:30 UTC+5:30	Stefanie Raschle 85' (pen.)	Report	Tamang 19'; Dangmei 81'	Stadium: Evrenseki/Ilıca Stadium

30 January Unofficial friendly	Spartak Moscow (Russia)	0–0	India	Antalya, Turkey
19:30 UTC+5:30		Report		Stadium: Evrenseki Stadium

2 February Unofficial friendly	Hertha BSC (Germany)	0–1	India	Antalya, Turkey
17:30 UTC+5:30		Report	Dangmei 37'	Stadium: Evrenseki Stadium

4 February Unofficial friendly	Zvezda-2005 Perm (Russia)	0–2	India	Serik, Turkey
17:30 UTC+5:30		Report	Tamang 9'; Kom 89'	Stadium: S&B Sport Football Complex

7 February Unofficial friendly	Csíkszereda (Romania)	1–0	India	Serik, Turkey
	? 12'	Report		Stadium: Fanatic Tour Serik Sport Center

19 February Unofficial friendly	Perth RedStar (Australia)	0–5	India	Perth, Australia
14:30 UTC+5:30		Report	A. Singh; Xaxa; Phanjoubam; Yadav	Stadium: Dalmatinac Sports & Community Club Ground

23 February Unofficial friendly	Perth Azzurri (Australia)	2–7	India	Perth, Australia
16:00 UTC+5:30	?? (pen.); ??	Report	Dangmei; Haldar; Lisham; Pakkirisamy; Basfore	Stadium: Macedonia Park
