= List of foreign women's football players in India =

This is a list of foreign players who have played for the Indian Women's League (IWL) clubs which commenced since the 2016–17 season. The following players must meet both of the following three criteria:

1. Players signed and registered by IWL clubs for the IWL season.
2. Players signed by IWL clubs for continental competitions.
3. Are considered foreign, i.e., outside India determined by the following:

A player is considered foreign if she is not eligible to play for the national team of India.

More specifically,

- If a player has been capped on international level, the national team is used; if she has been capped by more than one country, the highest level (or the most recent) team is used.
- If a player has not been capped on international level, her country of birth is used, except those who were born abroad from Indian parents or moved to India at a young age, and those who clearly indicated to have switched her nationality to another nation.

Clubs listed are those which have contracted the player. Note that calendar years are used. This follows general practice in expressing years a player spent at club.

As of March 2026, 17 different nations have been represented in the IWL. Mozambique is the most recent nation to be represented with Ninika debuting for Gokulam Kerala on 20 December 2025.

In bold: players who are currently active with an IWL club.

As of November 2026.

== Africa (CAF) ==
=== Burundi ===
- **Asha Djafari** – Gokulam Kerala – 2026–

=== Cameroon ===
- Eliane Bodolo – Odisha – 2024–25
- Sorelle Hornella Metiefangtagne – Gokulam Kerala – 2026
- Moussa Zouwairatou – Sethu – 2024–25

=== Ghana ===
- Philomena Abakah – Kickstart – 2024–25, Sribhumi – 2026
- Elshaddai Acheampong – Gokulam Kerala – 2021–22, East Bengal – 2024–25
- Gifty Acheampong – Nita – 2024–25
- Constance Achiaa – HOPS – 2024–25
- Vivian Adjei – Gokulam Kerala – 2022–23
- **Emmanuella Adzi** – Sethu – 2026–
- **Juanita Aguadze** – Sethu – 2026–
- **Adama Alhassan** – East Bengal – 2026–
- Faustina Worwornyo Akpo – Odisha – 2022–23
- Queenable Akousa Amankrah – Sribhumi – 2024–25
- Gladys Amfobea – HOPS – 2023–25
- **Olivia Anokye** – East Bengal – 2026–
- **Abigail Antwi** – Sethu – 2025–26, East Bengal – 2026–
- Diana Antwi – Sesa – 2025–26
- Regina Antwi – Sribhumi – 2024–25
- Veronica Appiah – Gokulam Kerala – 2023–24, Sribhumi – 2026
- **Catherine Arthur** – Garhwal United – 2026–
- **Joyce Asamoah** – Nita – 2026–
- Sandra Atinga – Sribhumi – 2024–25, Gokulam Kerala – 2025–26
- **Mercy Attobrah** – Kickstart – 2026–
- **Holali Ativor** – Kickstart – 2026–
- **Elizabeth Danso** – Garhwal United – 2026–
- Susan Ama Duah – Gokulam Kerala – 2021
- Doreen Graham – Sethu – 2025–26
- Rahama Jafaru – Nita – 2024–25
- Sussana Konadu – Nita – 2024–26
- **Matilda Kwao** – Nita – 2025–
- Joyce Larbi – Garhwal United – 2025–26
- Priscilla Lartey – Sribhumi – 2025–26
- Beatrice Ntiwaa Nketia – Gokulam Kerala – 2022–24, Sesa – 2025–26
- **Abena Anoma Opoku** – East Bengal – 2025–
- Sonia Opoku – Misaka United FC – 2022–23
- Felicia Daw Owusu – Sribhumi – 2025–26
- Abigail Sakyiwaa – Kickstart – 2024–25
- Mercy Amorkor Tagoe – Celtic Queens Fc – 2022–23
- **Kadidja Ibrahim Teme** – Nita – 2026–
- **Ernestina Tetteh** – Sirvodem SC – 2021–22, Garhwal United – 2025–
- Fredrica Torkudzor – HOPS – 2023–24
- Diana Weige – Kickstart – 2024–25
- Jennifer Kankam Yeboah – Odisha – 2024–25

=== Gabon ===
- **Victoire Biatholi Maimouna** – Sethu – 2026–

=== Ivory Coast ===
- Espérance Agbo – Gokulam Kerala – 2019–20

=== Kenya ===
- Maurine Achieng – East Bengal – 2024–25, Sesa – 2026
- Catherine Aringo – Gokulam Kerala – 2024–25
- Ivy Faith Atieno – Sethu – 2022–23
- Lucy Kwekwe Jira – Misaka United FC – 2022–23
- Elizabeth Kioko Katungwa – Sethu – 2021–22, Kickstart – 2022–23, Nita – 2026
- Idah Atieno Odhiambo – Celtic Queens FC – 2022–23
- Bertha Adhiambo Omita – Sethu – 2023–24, Sesa – 2025–26
- **Phoeby Okech Owiti** – Gokulam Kerala – 2023–
- Dorcas Sikobe – Sethu – 2022–23

=== Malawi ===
- **Vanessa Chikupira** – Gokulam Kerala – 2026–

=== Mozambique ===
- Ninika – Gokulam Kerala – 2025–26

=== Nigeria ===
- Ayomide Awawu Anibaba – Kolhapur City – 2018–19
- Rafiat Titilayo Aweda – Kickstart – 2025–26
- Loveth Njideka Edeh – Kickstart – 2025–26
- Crystal Nnenna Eke – Kolhapur City – 2018–19
- Emem Essien – Kickstart – 2025–26
- Maryam Ibrahim – Odisha – 2024–25
- Maureen Tovia Okpala – East Bengal – 2025
- Regina Olasele – Nita – 2024–25
- Emueje Ogbiagbevha – Gokulam Kerala – 2026
- Uchenna Ritacascia Ukachukwu – Hans Women FC – 2018–19

=== Togo ===
- Amiratou N'djambara – Nita – 2025–26

=== Uganda ===
- Joanita Ainembabazi – Kickstart – 2024–25
- **Fazila Ikwaput** – Gokulam Kerala – 2017–18, 2023–25, East Bengal – 2025–
- Amnah Nababi – Sethu – 2024–25
- Ritah Nabbosa – Gokulam Kerala – 2017–18
- Hadijah Nandago – Sethu – 2024–25
- Sharon Namatovu – Gokulam Kerala – 2024–25
- **Resty Nanziri** – East Bengal – 2024–

== Asia (AFC) ==
=== Bangladesh ===
- Sanjida Akhter – East Bengal – 2023–24
- Sabina Khatun – Sethu – 2017–18, Kickstart – 2023–24
- Krishna Rani Sarkar – Sethu – 2017–18

=== Bhutan ===
- Sonam Choden – Kickstart – 2024–25
- Sangita Monger – Sesa – 2026

=== Iran ===
- Hajar Dabbaghi – Gokulam Kerala – 2023

=== Japan ===
- **Hitomi Tanaka** – East Bengal – 2026–

=== Malaysia ===
- Nurul Azurin Mazlan – Misaka United FC – 2022–23

=== Myanmar ===
- Win Theingi Tun – Gokulam Kerala – 2021–22, Odisha – 2023–24

=== Nepal ===
- Anita Basnet – Sethu – 2018–20, Lords FA – 2022–23
- Sabitra Bhandari – Sethu – 2018–19, Gokulam Kerala – 2019–20, 2022–23
- Rashmi Kumari Ghising – Sports Odisha – 2023–24
- Amrita Jaishi – Sports Odisha – 2023–24
- Anita K.C. – Kickstart – 2023–24
- Saru Limbu – Kickstart – 2022–23, 2026
- Renuka Nagarkote – Kickstart – 2022–23, 2026
- Rekha Poudel – Sports Odisha – 2022–23
- Preeti Rai – Kickstart – 2023–24
- Gita Rana – Sethu – 2023–24
- Dipa Shahi – Kickstart – 2023–24
- Anjila Tumbapo Subba – Sethu – 2022–24, 2025–26

=== Philippines ===
- Shelah Cadag – Odisha – 2023–24
- Camille Rodriguez – Lords FA – 2022–23

== Europe (UEFA) ==
=== England ===
- Klesha Rosa Darroux – Odisha – 2023–24
- Tanvie Hans – Sethu – 2017–18, Bangalore United FC – 2018–20

== North, Central America and Caribbean (CONCACAF) ==
=== Puerto Rico ===
- Adriana Tirado – Gokulam Kerala – 2021

=== United States ===
- Alexandra Marie Eccard – Mumbai Knights – 2022–23

== South America (CONMEBOL) ==
=== Brazil ===
- Cynthia Santos – Odisha – 2022–23

=== Colombia ===
- Karen Páez – Gokulam Kerala – 2021

== Notes ==
1. Born in India
2. Signed for continental competitions
