= Martina Thokchom =

Indian football player

Personal information
- Full name: Martina Devi Thokchom
- Date of birth: 13 July 2004 (age 22)
- Place of birth: Yourbung, Imphal East, Manipur, India
- Height: 1.70 m (5 ft 7 in)
- Position: Midfielder

Team information
- Current team: Sethu
- Number: 13

Senior career*
Years	Team	Apps	(Gls)
- Eastern Sporting Union
- KRYPHSA
2021–2022	Indian Arrows Women		
2022–2025	Gokulam Kerala	18	(0)
2025–	Sethu		

International career^{‡}
2017–2020	India U17		
2023	India U20		
2021–	India	18	(0)
- * Club domestic league appearances and goals as of 18 April 2025 ‡ National team caps and goals as of 10 March 2026

Martina Devi Thokchom (Meitei: Thokchom Martina Devi, born 13 July 2004) is an Indian professional footballer from Manipur, who plays as a midfielder for the club Sethu in the Indian Women's League and represents the India women's national football team.

== Early life ==
Martina hails from Yourbung in Manipur. Her father was a football player, who played at the state level. Both her father, Thokchom Sanatomba, and mother encouraged her to play football and enrolled her in the local grassroots training programme when she was 10-years old. Later, she joined KRYHPSA club and trained under Coach Chaoba Devi.

== Career ==
- 2017: She was part of the Under-17 Women's Football Tournament.
- 2019: She represented Manipur in the Hero Junior Women's National Football Championship in April.
- 2020: She was part of the Junior India team that player U-17 Women's Football Friendly Tournament in Mumbai against Sweden.
- 2021: In April, she was selected for the friendlies against Belarus and Uzbekistan.
- 2021: She was selected for Indian team to take part in the AFC Women's Asian Cup 2022 in India.
- 2021: She made her Senior India debut against UAE in a friendly match which India won 4–1.
- 2021: In December, she played the International Women's Football Tournament in Brazil against Venezuela.
- 2022: She played in the two friendly matches against Jordan and Egypt in Zarqa, Jordan.
- 2023: In February, Martina captained the Indian team at the SAFF U-20 Women's Championship in Dhaka. Bangladesh and Nepal are the other teams.

== Career statistics ==
=== International ===
As of 10 March 2026

National team	Year	Caps	Goals
India	2021	6	0
India	2022	3	0
India	2023	0	0
India	2024	0	0
India	2025	6	0
India	2026	3	0
Total		18	0

== Honours ==
Gokulam Kerala

- Indian Women's League: 2022–23

Individual

- 2022: AIFF Awards 2021-22: Women's Emerging Footballer of the Year.
