= Michel Castanha =

Indian footballer

Personal information
- Full name: Michel Margaret Castanha
- Date of birth: 23 December 1992 (age 33)
- Place of birth: Curtorim, Goa, India
- Position: Defender

Youth career
- Bodyline Club

Senior career*
Years	Team	Apps	(Gls)
- Bodyline Club
- Panjim Footballers
2016–2017	Pune City		
2017–2018	India Rush Soccer		
2018	Churchill Brothers		
2019–2021	Gokulam Kerala		
2021–2022	Sethu		
2022–2023	Gokulam Kerala		
2023	Sesa FA		
2023–2024	East Bengal		
2025	Sribhumi		

International career^{‡}
2009	India U20		
2018–2023	India	8	(0)
- * Club domestic league appearances and goals ‡ National team caps and goals as of 2023

Michel Margaret Castanha (born 23 December 1992) is an Indian football coach and former footballer who played as a defender for the India women's national football team.

== Early life ==
Castanha hails from Curtorim and began her career at the age of eight playing for a Bodyline Club from Maharashtra.

== Career ==
Castanha made her debut in the Under-17 Nationals at the age of 12 in Chandigarh in 2005. In the Indian top tier, Castanha played for Pune City and India Rush Soccer in 2016 and 2017 editions. Castanha has spent two seasons with Gokulam Kerala FC in the IWL and was part of the title-winning squad in 2019 and 2022 editions. She also played for Sethu FC which finished runners-up in the 2021 season.

She made her debut for the Indian national team at the AFC Asian Cup Qualifiers 2018 in South Korea. She was part of the national team which won the SAFF Championship and the South Asian Games in 2019. She was part of the Indian team which participated in the 2022 AFC Asian Cup but withdrew due to COVID pandemic. In July 2023, she was selected for the Senior India camp to be held at Bhubaneshwar from July 30 for the AFC Olympic Qualifiers Round II which was held at Tashkent.

== Coaching ==
Since 2025, Castanha has transitioned into coaching following stints with Goa Football Development Council and state's AIFF-FIFA Talent Development Scheme for girls.

== Honours ==
India

- SAFF Women's Championship: 2019
- South Asian Games Gold medal: 2019

Gokulam Kerala

- Indian Women's League: 2019–20, 2022–23

Sethu

- Indian Women's League runner-up: 2021–22

Panjim Footballers

- Goa Women's League: 2017
