= Renu Gour =

Indian footballer

Personal information
- Date of birth: 16 January 2001 (age 25)
- Place of birth: Mangali Mohabat, Hissar, Haryana, India
- Position: Forward

Team information
- Current team: Gokulam Kerala

Senior career*
Years	Team	Apps	(Gls)
- Kenkre
- Baroda FA
- Kolhapur City
- Kickstart
2022	Sethu	11	(8)
2022–2024	HOPS		
2024–2026	Kickstart		
2026	Sribhumi		
2026–	Gokulam Kerala		

International career^{‡}
2016	India U16	4	(4)
2018	India U19	3	(5)
2021–	India	25	(4)
- * Club domestic league appearances and goals ‡ National team caps and goals as of 11 October 2026

Renu Gour (also Renu Rani, born 16 January 2001) is an Indian professional footballer who plays as a forward for the Indian Women's League club Gokulam Kerala and the India women's national team.

== Early life ==
Renu was born in Mangali Mohabat, Haryana.

== Club career ==
Renu has played for Kickstart FC in India.

== International career ==
Renu made her senior debut for India on 8 April 2021 as a 88th-minute substitution in a 1–2 friendly loss to Belarus. She scored her first goal for national team against Chinese Taipei in a friendly match on 13 October 2021.

== Career statistics ==
=== International ===
As of 11 October 2026

National team	Year	Caps	Goals
India	2021	7	1
India	2022	5	0
India	2023	9	3
India	2024	0	0
India	2025	2	0
India	2026	2	0
Total		25	4

Scores and results list India's goal tally first.

List of international goals scored by Renu Gour
No.	Date	Venue	Opponent	Score	Result	Competition
1.	13 October 2021	Hamad Town Stadium, Hamad Town, Bahrain	Chinese Taipei	1–0	1–0	Friendly
2.	19 March 2023	Petra Stadium, Amman, Jordan	Jordan	1–2	1–2	Friendly
3.	4 April 2023	Dolen Omurzakov Stadium, Bishkek, Kyrgyzstan	Kyrgyzstan	3–0	5–0	2024 AFC Women's Olympic Qualifiers
4.	7 April 2023	Dolen Omurzakov Stadium, Bishkek, Kyrgyzstan	Kyrgyzstan	4–0	4–0	2024 AFC Women's Olympic Qualifiers

== Honours ==
Haryana

- Rajmata Jijabai Trophy runner-up: 2022–23
