= Indumathi Kathiresan =

Indian footballer

Personal information
- Full name: Indumathi Kathiresan
- Date of birth: 5 June 1994 (age 32)
- Place of birth: Cuddalore, Tamil Nadu, India
- Position: Midfielder

Senior career*
Years	Team	Apps	(Gls)
2016–2017	Jeppiaar Institute	3	(5)
2017	Sethu FC	9	(4)
2021	Tamilnadu Police		
2022	Lords FA	10	(33)
2023	Gokulam Kerala	10	(9)
2023–2024	Odisha		

International career^{‡}
2014–	India	59	(17)
- * Club domestic league appearances and goals as of 19 May 2023 ‡ National team caps and goals as of 27 February 2024

Indumathi Kathiresan (born 5 June 1994) is an Indian professional footballer who plays as a midfielder for the India women's national football team.

== International career ==
Indumathi has represented the India women's national football team since 2014. She scored 6 goals in 2014 SAFF Women's Championship. Then she became regular choice of national team. She was also selected in the squad for the 2016 SAFF Women's Championship. Where she scored 2 goals for team. Then she scored 4 goals and become top scorer of 2019 SAFF Women's Championship.

== Career statistics ==
=== International ===
As of 27 February 2024

National team	Year	Caps	Goals
India	2014	5	6
India	2015	0	0
India	2016	2	0
India	2017	6	2
India	2018	2	0
India	2019	18	5
India	2021	12	1
India	2022	0	0
India	2023	11	2
India	2024	3	1
Total		59	17

Scores and results list India's goal tally first.

List of international goals scored by Indumathi Kathiresan
No.	Date	Venue	Opponent	Score	Result	Competition
1.	15 November 2014	Jinnah Sports Stadium, Islamabad, Pakistan	Bangladesh	5–1	5–1	2014 SAFF Women's Championship
2.	17 November 2014	Jinnah Sports Stadium, Islamabad, Pakistan	Afghanistan	1–0	12–0	2014 SAFF Women's Championship
3.	17 November 2014	Jinnah Sports Stadium, Islamabad, Pakistan	Afghanistan	3–0	12–0	2014 SAFF Women's Championship
4.	17 November 2014	Jinnah Sports Stadium, Islamabad, Pakistan	Afghanistan	9–0	12–0	2014 SAFF Women's Championship
5.	19 November 2014	Jinnah Sports Stadium, Islamabad, Pakistan	Sri Lanka	1–0	5–0	2014 SAFF Women's Championship
6.	19 November 2014	Jinnah Sports Stadium, Islamabad, Pakistan	Sri Lanka	4–0	5–0	2014 SAFF Women's Championship
7.	2 January 2017	Kanchenjunga Stadium, Siliguri, India	Nepal	2–0	3–1	2016 SAFF Women's Championship
8.	5 January 2017	Kanchenjunga Stadium, Siliguri, India	Bangladesh	3–1	3–1	2016 SAFF Women's Championship
9.	1 March 2019	Alanya, Turkey	Turkmenistan	10–0	10–0	2019 Turkish Women's Cup
10.	13 March 2019	Sahid Rangsala, Biratnagar, Nepal	Maldives	3–0	6–0	2019 SAFF Women's Championship
11.	17 March 2019	Sahid Rangsala, Biratnagar, Nepal	Sri Lanka	3–0	5–0	2019 SAFF Women's Championship
12.	20 March 2019	Sahid Rangsala, Biratnagar, Nepal	Bangladesh	2–0	4–0	2019 SAFF Women's Championship
13.	20 March 2019	Sahid Rangsala, Biratnagar, Nepal	Bangladesh	3–0	4–0	2019 SAFF Women's Championship
14.	10 October 2021	Hamad Town Stadium, Hamad Town, Bahrain	Bahrain	3–0	5–0	Friendly
15.	15 February 2023	Jawaharlal Nehru Stadium, Chennai, India	Nepal	2–0	2–2	Friendly
16.	28 March 2023	Pakhtakor Stadium, Tashkent, Uzbekistan	Uzbekistan	2–2	3–2	Friendly
17.	21 February 2024	Gold City Sports Complex, Alanya, Turkey	Estonia	2–1	4–3	2024 Turkish Women's Cup

== Honours ==
India

- SAFF Women's Championship: 2014, 2016, 2019
- Top female player of the year 2023–24 by AIFF

Sethu

- Indian Women's League: 2018–19

Lords FA

- Kerala Women's League: 2022–23

Gokulam Kerala

- Indian Women's League: 2022–23

Odisha

- Indian Women's League: 2023–24

Tamil Nadu

- Rajmata Jijabai Trophy: 2017–18, 2022–23

Individual

- Indian Women's League Hero of the League: 2022–23
- Indian Women's League Best Midfielder: 2023–24
