= Nandini Mattu =

Indian footballer

Personal information
- Full name: Nandini Mattu
- Date of birth: 6 June 2007 (age 19)
- Place of birth: Punjab, India
- Height: 1.80 m (5 ft 11 in)
- Positions: Goalkeeper; forward (Note: Mattu played a forward earlier in her career.)

Team information
- Current team: Sethu
- Number: 1

Youth career
- GMSSS Chandigarh

Senior career*
Years	Team	Apps	(Gls)
2022	Bengaluru FC		
2022	Eves SC		
2025	Odisha		
2025–	Sethu		

International career^{‡}
2023	India U17		
2026–	India	1	(0)
- * Club domestic league appearances and goals ‡ National team caps and goals as of 11 October 2026

Nandini Mattu (born 6 June 2007) is an Indian professional footballer from Punjab, who plays as a midfielder or goalkeeper for the Indian Women's League club Sethu and the India national team.

== Early life and education ==
Nandini is from Chandigarh, Punjab. Her father Vijay Kumar is a Class IV employee at Udyog Bhavan in Sector 17, and her mother, Bharti, works as a domestic help. She did her schooling at Government Model Senior Secondary School, Sector 22, Chandigarh. She trained under coach Bhupinder Singh at the school.

== Career ==
Nandini started as a forward but later decided to become a goalkeeper following the suggestion from their coaches and senior players to take advantage of her height. She played the Under 17 Women's National Football Championship at Assam and based on her performance, she was selected among the 21 member Indian probable for the camp. Then, she was selected for the under 17 team and played for India in Jordan. In the Chandigarh Under 13 League, she was selected as the Best Player of the Tournament and in January 2022, she joined the Bengaluru Football Club's residential academy on a four-month contact. That led to her playing the Karnataka State Football Association's Women's A Division League and she scored a hattrick in her very first match against GRK Girls Football Club. In July 2022, she was the top scorer in the pre-Subroto Cup tournament in Chandigarh and was part of the GMSSS 22 which qualified for the main Subroto Cup. In May 2024, she represented Chandigarh in the Senior Women's National Football Championship for Rajmata Jijabai Trophy final round in Kolkata, West Bengal.

She was selected among the probables for the camp ahead of the friendlies against Maldives. She made it to the senior India team in the first FIFA friendly against Maldives at the Padukone-Dravid Centre for Sports Excellence on 1 January 2025 but did not get a chance to get into the playing XI and sat on the bench. She was replaced by Ribansi Jamu for the second match.

== Career statistics ==
=== International ===
As of 11 October 2026

National team	Year	Caps	Goals
India	2026	1	0
Total		1	0
