= Grace Hauhnar =

Indian footballer (born 2001)

Personal information
- Full name: Grace Lalrampari Hauhnar
- Date of birth: 20 February 2001 (age 25)
- Place of birth: Aizawl, Mizoram, India
- Position: Midfielder

Team information
- Current team: Sethu
- Number: 8

Senior career*
| Years | Team | Apps | (Gls) |
| 2016–2017 | Aizawl | | |
| 2017–2018 | India Rush SC | 6 | (0) |
| 2018–2019 | Kenkre | | |
| 2019 | → Vakiria (loan) | | |
| 2019–2020 | Gokulam Kerala | 8 | (2) |
| 2021–2022 | Sethu | 10 | (2) |
| 2022–2025 | Odisha | 25 | (1) |
| 2024 | → Mizo Football News (loan) | | |
| 2025– | Sethu | | |

International career
| 2016–2018 | India U17 | 8 | (0) |
| 2016–2018 | India U20 | 5 | (1) |
| 2019– | India | 1 | (0) |
- * Club domestic league appearances and goals

Grace Lalrampari Hauhnar (born 20 February 2001) is an Indian professional footballer who plays as a midfielder for the Indian Women's League club Sethu and the India women's national team.

== Club career ==
Hauhnar played for Gokulam Kerala in India. She was part of the Mizoram state team which reached the semi-finals of the Senior Women's National Football Championship for the first time in the 2021–22 edition.

== International career ==
Hauhnar represented the India U20 team at the 2019 AFC U-19 Women's Championship qualification and scored against Thailand. She was called up for the national team for the friendly matches against Vietnam and the 2019 South Asian Games in 2019. Hauhnar made her national team debut at the 2019 Turkish Women's Cup against Turkmenistan. She also played at the 2019 COTIF Women's Cup against Mauritania.

== Career statistics ==
=== International ===
As of 2025

| National team | Year | Caps | Goals |
|---|---|---|---|
| India | 2019 | 1 | 0 |
| Total | | 1 | 0 |

== Honours ==
Gokulam Kerala

- Indian Women's League: 2019–20

Sethu

- Indian Women's League runner-up: 2021–22
- Tamil Nadu Women's League: 2021–22

Odisha

- Indian Women's League: 2023–24

Mizo Football News

- Mizoram Women's League: 2023–24

Individual

- Mizoram Women's League Top Scorer: 2019
