= Kajol D'Souza =

Indian footballer (born 2006)

Personal information
- Full name: Kajol Hubert D’Souza
- Date of birth: 28 April 2006 (age 20)
- Place of birth: Pune, Maharashtra, India
- Position: Midfielder

Youth career
- LaLiga Football Schools

Senior career*
Years	Team	Apps	(Gls)
2021–2022	Parikrama Club		
2022–2024	Sethu	18	(14)
2024–2025	Odisha	14	(0)
2025	→ Kickstart (loan)	24	(8)
2025–2026	Al-Amal	10	(5)

International career^{‡}
- India U17
2022–	India U20	11	(2)
2024–	India	2	(3)
- * Club domestic league appearances and goals as of 10 April 2026 ‡ National team caps and goals as of 2 January 2025

Kajol Hubert D’Souza (born 28 April 2006) is an Indian professional footballer from Maharashtra, who last played as a midfielder for the Saudi Women's First Division League club Al-Amal and the India national football team. She has also played for the clubs Sethu and Odisha.

== Early life ==
Encouraged by her mother Gratia, she took up football in 2014 and started playing in her community with boys along with her brother Kian. Her mother, a sprinter, is from Mangalore and her father is from Pune. She studied at The Bishop's School, and joined the Arsenal School programme. She trained at the LaLiga Academy, Madrid, and studied there from September 2023 to June 2024.

== Career ==
In 2018, Kajol's first big tournament was the 64th Nationals organised by School Games Federation of India and she scored nine goals for Maharashtra, which won bronze. In 2019, she played in the 65th Nationals organised by School Games Federation of India; La Liga football schools to Spain scholarship.

She played for Pune, which won the Inter-district championship at Jalgaon in 2020. In 2021, she played for La Liga Schools, Pune and Parikrama Club in the Indian Women's League.

In 2022, she was selected for the Tour of Italy for the 6th Torneo Female Football tournament and Tour of Norway for the Open Nordic U-16 Tournament as part of the India national under-17 team. In 2022, she made her debut for Junior India and played in the FIFA Under-17 Women's World Cup, where she played in the group stage against United States, Morocco and Brazil. In 2023, she played in AFC U-20 Women's Asian Cup Qualifiers in Vietnam.

== Career statistics ==
=== International ===
As of 2 January 2025

National team	Year	Caps	Goals
India	2024	1	2
India	2025	1	1
Total		2	3

Scores and results list India's goal tally first.

List of international goals scored by Kajol D'Souza
No.	Date	Venue	Opponent	Score	Result	Competition
1.	30 December 2024	Padukone – Dravid Centre for Sports Excellence, Bengaluru, India	Maldives	12–0	14–0	Friendly
2.	30 December 2024	Padukone – Dravid Centre for Sports Excellence, Bengaluru, India	Maldives	14–0	14–0	Friendly
3.	2 January 2025	Padukone – Dravid Centre for Sports Excellence, Bengaluru, India	Maldives	2–0	11–1	Friendly
