= Vivian Adjei =

Ghanaian association football player

Personal information
- Full name: Vivian Konadu Adjei
- Date of birth: 14 January 2000 (age 26)
- Place of birth: Techiman, Bono East, Ghana
- Position: Forward

Team information
- Current team: Ferencváros
- Number: 10

Youth career
- Kumasi Sports Academy

Senior career*
Years	Team	Apps	(Gls)
- Kumasi Sports Academy
2020−2022	Thunder Queens		
2022−2023	Gokulam Kerala	20	(44)
2023−	Ferencváros	0	(0)

International career
2016	Ghana U17		
2021−	Ghana		
- * Club domestic league appearances and goals as of 19 May 2023

Vivian Konadu Adjei (born 14 January 2000) is a Ghanaian international footballer who plays as a forward for Noi NB I club Ferencváros and the Ghana women's national team.

== Early life ==
A native of Techiman in the Bono East Region of Ghana, Adjei had her junior and senior secondary school at the Kumasi Sports Academy JHS and SHS. The Kumasi Sports Academy is a football academy that offers formal education opportunities to young footballers whilst developing their skills as footballers.

== Club career ==
Adjei started her career with Ghana Women’s Premier League side Kumasi Sports Academy Ladies. She subsequently joined Thunder Queens and scored seven goals in the 2020–21 Ghana Women's Premier League ending the season as the club's top goal scorer. Most notable amongst those goals was a late header in the 85th minute that gave Thunder Queens a 2–1 victory over Immigration Ladies on 5 May 2021. She was adjudged as the woman of the match at the end of the 90 minutes. The following season, 2021–22 season, she played 15 league matches, scored 7 goals and provided 3 assists.

On 6 August 2022, Adjei joined Indian Women's League club Gokulam Kerala as one of the foreign players. In her first season, she scored 44 goals in 20 matches, including 7 matches in the 2022–23 IWL season to help Kerala retain their league title.

In August 2023, Adjei signed for Hungarian Champions Ferencváros.

== International career ==
Adjei has capped for Ghana at the U17 and senior level. In 2016, she represented the Ghana U17 at the 2016 FIFA U-17 Women's World Cup along with players like Sandra Owusu-Ansah and Blessing Agbomadzi. She played three matches as Ghana were eliminated by South Korea in the quarter-finals.

In July 2021, Adjei made the squad for the Aisha Buhari Cup and 2022 Africa Women Cup of Nations qualifiers against Nigeria. She made her senior debut during an Aisha Buhari Cup match against Cameroon women's national team on 20 September 2021. She marked the debut by scoring her first goal in the 89th minute of the match to help Ghana to a 2–0 victory.

== Honours ==
Gokulam Kerala

- Indian Women's League: 2022–23

== See also ==
- List of Ghana women's international footballers
