= Babina Devi Lisham =

Indian footballer

Babina Devi
Personal information
- Full name: Babina Devi Lisham
- Date of birth: 1 February 2005 (age 21)
- Place of birth: Haokha Maning Leikai, Thoubal, Manipur, India
- Height: 1.67 m (5 ft 6 in)
- Position: Midfielder

Team information
- Current team: Sethu
- Number: 6

Senior career*
Years	Team	Apps	(Gls)
- The Young Welfare Club
–2024	Kickstart		
2024–	Sethu		

International career^{‡}
2021–2022	India U17		
2025–	India	9	(0)
- * Club domestic league appearances and goals ‡ National team caps and goals as of 11 October 2026

Babina Devi Lisham (Meitei: Lisham Babina Devi, 1 February 2005) is an Indian professional footballer from Manipur who plays as a midfielder for the Indian Women's League club Sethu and the India women's national football team.

== Early life ==
Lisham is from Haokha Maning Leikai in Thoubal district, Manipur. She is the daughter of Lisham Kunjo, a mason. Lisham used to play with nobab, a ball shaped citrus fruit, when she was spotted by Mutum Surmala Chanu, a police woman and former assistant coach of India's senior women football team. She initially trained under Surmala at the local football ground of Young Welfare Club.

== Career ==
Lisham was selected by Indian chief coach Crispin Chettri for the National camp at Anantapur, Andhra Pradesh, in preparation for the Pink Ladies Cup, at Sharjah, United Arab Emirates, from 20 to 26 February 2025. On 17 February 2025, she was named in the final squad. She made her senior India debut against Jordan at the Al Hamriya Sports Club Stadium, Sharjah on 20 February 2025.

She represented the Indian under-15 team in the South Asian Football Federation (SAFF) women's championships held in Bhutan in 2021.

Before joining Sethu FC, Lisham played for the Young Welfare Club and Kickstart FC, Karnataka.

== Career statistics ==
=== International ===
As of 11 October 2026

National team	Year	Caps	Goals
India	2025	5	0
India	2026	4	0
Total		9	0
