= Shreya Hooda =

Indian footballer

Personal information
- Date of birth: 25 May 1999 (age 27)
- Place of birth: Sonipat, Haryana, India
- Height: 1.70 m (5 ft 7 in)
- Position: Goalkeeper

Team information
- Current team: Gokulam Kerala
- Number: 1

Senior career*
Years	Team	Apps	(Gls)
- Hans Capital FC
- PIFA Sports
- Kolhapur City
2021–2022	Gokulam Kerala		
2022–2025	Odisha		
2025–	Gokulam Kerala	9	(0)

International career^{‡}
2014	India U16		
2023–	India	19	(0)
- * Club domestic league appearances and goals as of 15 May 2026 ‡ National team caps and goals as of 25 May 2026

Shreya Hooda (25 May 1999) is an Indian professional footballer from Haryana. She plays as a goalkeeper for the Indian Women's League club Gokulam Kerala and the India women's national football team. She was part of the Indian squad at the 2022 Asian Games.

== Early life ==
She was born in Sonipat, Haryana. At the young age of 13, she began playing football and played for India in the Under-14 and Under-16 tournaments as a goalkeeper.

== Domestic career ==
Starting with the Haryana State team, Shreya represented Gokulam Kerala FC, Football Club Kolhapur City, PIFA Sports (Colaba) FC, Himachal Pradesh FA (Women's) Club, Himachal Pradesh Santosh Trophy team 2017 and Hans Capital Football Club in domestic tournaments. She represented the winning Haryana team at the Khelo India games. She also won the Indian Women's League with Gokulam Kerala FC. She was part of the Gokulam Kerala team that played in the AFC Women's Club Championship.

== International career ==
She made her senior India debut in 2021. In March 2023, she was in the Indian Senior team that played a goalless draw against Jordan at the Petra Stadium in Amman. In July 2023, she was named in the 34-member Senior India probable list for the AFC Olympics Qualifiers Round 2, to be played in October. Shreya played as a full-time goalkeeper against Chinese Taipei in the first match of the Asian Games which India lost 2–1.

== Career statistics ==
=== International ===
As of 25 May 2026

National team	Year	Caps	Goals
India	2021	1	0
India	2022	0	0
India	2023	8	0
India	2024	3	0
India	2025	3	0
India	2026	4	0
Total		19	0

== Honours ==
India

- SAFF Women's Championship: 2026

Gokulam Kerala

- Indian Women's League: 2021–22

Odisha

- Indian Women's League: 2023–24

Haryana

- Rajmata Jijabai Trophy runner-up: 2022–23

Individual

- Indian Women's League Best Goalkeeper: 2023–24
