= Anjila Tumbapo Subba =

Nepalese footballer

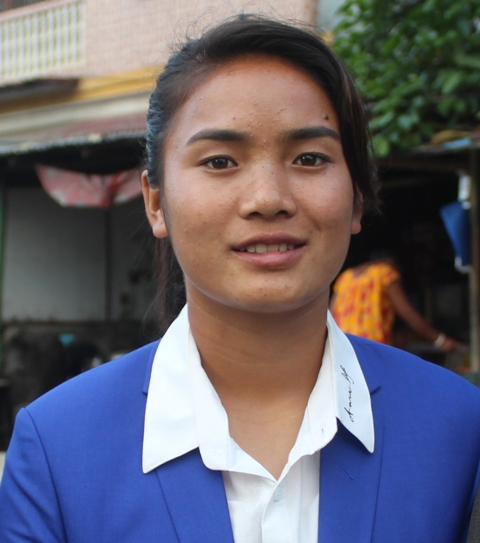
- Subba in 2019

Personal information
- Full name: Anjila Tumbapo Subba
- Date of birth: 25 July 1996 (age 30)
- Place of birth: Panchthar
- Position: Goalkeeper

Team information
- Current team: Sethu
- Number: 16

Senior career*
Years	Team	Apps	(Gls)
2012–2022	APF FC	50	(0)
2021–2022	Masha United	4	(1)
2022–2024	Sethu	19	(0)
2024–2025	Nees Atromitou	11	(0)
2025	APF FC	0	(0)
2025–	Sethu		

International career
2016–	Nepal	57	(0)
- * Club domestic league appearances and goals

Anjila Tumbapo Subba (Nepali: एन्जिला तुम्बापो सुब्बा; born 28 May 1996) is a Nepalese professional footballer who plays as a goalkeeper for the Indian Women's League club Sethu and the Nepal women's national football team.

== Early life ==
Anjila Tumbapo Subba started playing football from the age of thirteen. She completed her +2 level from Siddartha Banasthali College and is currently enrolled in BBS degree in the same college. She started her career from Purbanchal Women's Football Team in 2011 from where she played some local tournaments. Her performance caught the eyes of various departmental sides which led the departmental sides to offer her a contract. Among the offer received she choose Armed Police Force – APF Women’s Football Team. She joined APF back in 2012 and now is first choice Goal Keeper of the Team.

== Domestic career ==
In domestic league, Anjila plays for Armed Police Force-APF Women's Football Team. She joined APF in 2012.

== International career ==
She is currently considered as the first choice goalkeeper of the Nepal national women's football team. She played her debut match for Nepal in 2014 SAFF Championship held in India.

Prior to the 2025 AFC Women’s Asian Cup Qualifiers, she served as captain of Nepal’s national women’s football team. For the qualifiers in Uzbekistan, the team initially did not announce a captain. Before the opening match against Laos, Renuka Nagarkoti was named captain, but Sabitra Bhandari wore the armband at kick-off and captained all three matches. Goalkeeper Anjana Rana Magar played in each game, while Subba was not included in the matchday squad.

== Achievements ==
=== Domestic career ===
- Winner - NCELL Cup 2013
- Runner Up - National Women's League 2013
- Third - COAS International Women's Football Tournament 2014
- Runner Up - NCELL Cup 2014
- Winner - 7th COAS International Women's Football Tournament 2019

=== International career ===
- Winner - U14 AFC Regional Championship 2014
- Runner Up - SAFF Championship 2014
- Runner Up - SAFF Championship 2016
- Runner Up - Hero Gold Cup 2019
- Runner Up - SAFF Championship 2019
- Runner Up - NAZADA Cup 2019
- Runner Up - 13th South Asian Games 2019

== In popular culture ==
In 2025, a sports drama film on her journey of life and achievements titled Anjila directed by Milan Chams was released. It was selected as the Nepalese entry for the Best International Feature Film at the 98th Academy Awards.
