= Chaoba Devi Langam =

Indian footballer (born 1973)

Chaoba Devi
Personal information
- Full name: Chaoba Devi Langam
- Date of birth: 1 March 1973 (age 53)
- Place of birth: Imphal, Manipur, India
- Position: Defender

Senior career*
Years	Team	Apps	(Gls)
- Manipur

International career
1994–1999	India	?	(4)

Managerial career
- 2017–2020: KRYPHSA
- 2022–2026: Kickstart
- 2024: India (women)
- * Club domestic league appearances and goals

Chaoba Devi Langam (Meitei: Chaoba Devi Langam, born 1 March 1973) is an Indian football coach and former footballer from Manipur. She took up coaching and served as the assistant coach of the Indian women's team. She currently serves as the head coach of the club Kickstart in the Indian Women's League. She also served as the head coach of the India women's football team in 2024.

== Early life ==
Chaoba from Naoremthong Laishram Leikai, Imphal is a coach with the Youth Affairs and Sports department, Manipur. Her parents are Langam Angou and Kumudini. She is the youngest of the six siblings. Her parents were reluctant to let Chaoba play the game and they came to know about her football only when they saw her name in the newspapers after she got selected for the Manipur. She did her schooling in Kebol Girls High School and later went to the Manipur University.

Chaoba passed the NIS Coaching Diploma from SAI Kolkata and in 2014, she completed the AFC 'A ' certificate.

== Career ==
In 1990, she took part in the 9th Dana Cup International Women's Football Championship at Denmark. She was part of the Indian women's team at the 11th Asian Women's football championship at Ghuangzhou in 1997. She was part of the team at the 13th Asian Games at Bangkok in 1998. In 1999, she captained the Indian women's team that played at the 12th Asian Women Football Championship at Philippines.

== International goals ==
No.	Date	Venue	Opponent	Score	Result	Competition
1.	4 September 1994	Nehru Stadium, Madras, India	Chile	1–2	1–2	Jayalalitha Cup
2.	9 December 1997	Guangdong, China	Guam	?–0	10–0	1997 AFC Women's Championship
3.	9 December 1997	Guangdong, China	Guam	?–0	10–0	1997 AFC Women's Championship
4.	9 December 1997	Guangdong, China	Guam	?–0	10–0	1997 AFC Women's Championship
