= Priyangka Devi Naorem =

Indian footballer (born 2003)

Priyangka Devi
Personal information
- Full name: Priyangka Devi Naorem
- Date of birth: 9 April 2003 (age 23)
- Place of birth: Manipur, India
- Position: Midfielder

Team information
- Current team: East Bengal
- Number: 11

Senior career*
Years	Team	Apps	(Gls)
	Indian Arrows Women	11	(9)
2022	Kerala Blasters		
2023–2024	Sethu		
2024–	East Bengal		

International career^{‡}
- India U17
2022–	India	18	(5)
- * Club domestic league appearances and goals ‡ National team caps and goals as of 3 June 2026

Priyangka Devi Naorem (Meitei: Naorem Priyangka Devi, born 9 April 2003) is an Indian professional footballer who plays as a midfielder for the Indian Women's League club East Bengal and the India women's national football team.

== Club career ==
Devi started her senior career with Indian Arrows and played for them in the Indian Women's League. On 14 May 2022, she scored 4 goals in a 8–0 victory against Mata Rukmani FC. Priyangka Devi scored nine goals in 11 matches during the season. She was awarded with the emerging player of the season. In 2022, she was signed by Kerala Blasters as a part of their newly launched women's team.

== International career ==
With four goals, Devi was India's top-scorer in the 2021 SAFF U-19 Women's Championship. She was later called up into the senior national team in 2022. She made her debut for the senior national team on 6 April 2022 and scored the only goal in a 1–0 against Egypt.

== Career statistics ==
=== International ===
As of 3 June 2026

National team	Year	Caps	Goals
India	2022	5	2
India	2023	2	0
India	2024	5	0
India	2025	3	1
India	2026	3	2
Total		18	5

Scores and results list India's goal tally first.

List of international goals scored by Naorem Priyangka Devi
No.	Date	Venue	Opponent	Score	Result	Competition
1.	5 April 2022	Prince Mohammed Stadium, Zarqa, Jordan	Egypt	1–0	1–0	Friendly
2.	10 September 2022	Dasharath Rangasala, Kathmandu, Nepal	Maldives	2–0	9–0	2022 SAFF Women's Championship
3.	20 February 2025	Al Hamriya Sports Club Stadium, Al Hamriyah, UAE	Jordan	0–1	0–2	2025 Pink Ladies Cup
4.	25 May 2026	Jawaharlal Nehru Stadium, Margao, India	Maldives	0–1	0–11	2026 SAFF Women's Championship
5.	25 May 2026	Jawaharlal Nehru Stadium, Margao, India	Maldives	0–2	0–11	2026 SAFF Women's Championship

== Honours ==
India

- SAFF Women's Championship: 2026

East Bengal

- Indian Women's League: 2025–26

Manipur

- National Games Gold medal: 2022

Individual

- Indian Women's League Emerging Player of the League: 2021–22
