= Kaviya Pakkirisamy =

Indian football player

Personal information
- Date of birth: 23 December 2002 (age 23)
- Place of birth: Tamil Nadu, India
- Height: 1.56 m (5 ft 1 in)
- Position: Midfielder

Team information
- Current team: Sethu
- Number: 99

Senior career*
Years	Team	Apps	(Gls)
–2023	Kickstart		
2023–	Sethu		

International career^{‡}
2026–	India	4	(0)
- * Club domestic league appearances and goals ‡ National team caps and goals as of 11 April 2026

Kaviya Pakkirisamy (born 23 December 2002) is an Indian professional footballer from Tamil Nadu, who plays as a forward for Sethu in the Indian Women's League and the India women's national football team. She has also played for the club Kickstart.

== Career ==
In 2022, Kaviya played for Kickstart and was the top scorer of the Karnataka Women's League with 22 goals. She played for Kickstart in the 2021–22 Indian Women's League which finished third in the regular season. In the 2023 season, she played for Kickstart FC in the Indian Women's League. Kaviya scored her first IWL hattrick and received the Hero of the match award in the regular season match against Churchill Brothers. She represented Tamil Nadu in the 2022–23 Senior Women's National Football Championship.

== Career statistics ==
=== International ===
As of 11 April 2026

National team	Year	Caps	Goals
India	2026	4	0
Total		4	0
