= Odisha Tourism Development Corporation =

Indian state agency

Orissa Tourism Development Corporation Limited

OTDC overview
- Formed: 1979
- Headquarters: Janiwas (Old Block), Lewis Road, Bhubaneswar, 751014; 20°15′10.318″N 85°50′32.521″E
- Minister responsible: Shri Jyoti Prakash Panigrahi, Tourism and Culture
- OTDC executive: Shreemayee Mishra; Managing Director
- Parent department: Odisha Tourism Department
- Website: otdc.in

The Odisha Tourism Development Corporation (OTDC) is a Government of Odisha undertaking corporation in the Indian state of Odisha. It was incorporated in the year 1979 to promote tourism in the state and operate some of the existing tourist bungalows and transport fleets in commercial line. OTDC's Tourist Bungalows are called as Panthanivas.

== Panthanivas Locations ==
- Balasore
- Berhampur
- Bhubaneswar
- Chandaneswar
- Chandabali
- Chandipur
- Chilika Lake
- Cuttack
- Dhauli
- Gopalpur
- Kendujhar
- Konark
- Panchalingeshwar
- Paradip
- Puri
- Rambha
- Rourkela
- Sambalpur
- Satpada
- Similipal
- Taptapani

A live map is hosted on the official site with details of locations

== Tours ==
=== Packaged Tours ===
OTDC provides customised tour packages. Seasonal packages are also made available to facilitate travellers coming from other regions for special events like Nabakalebara 2015.

== Gallery ==
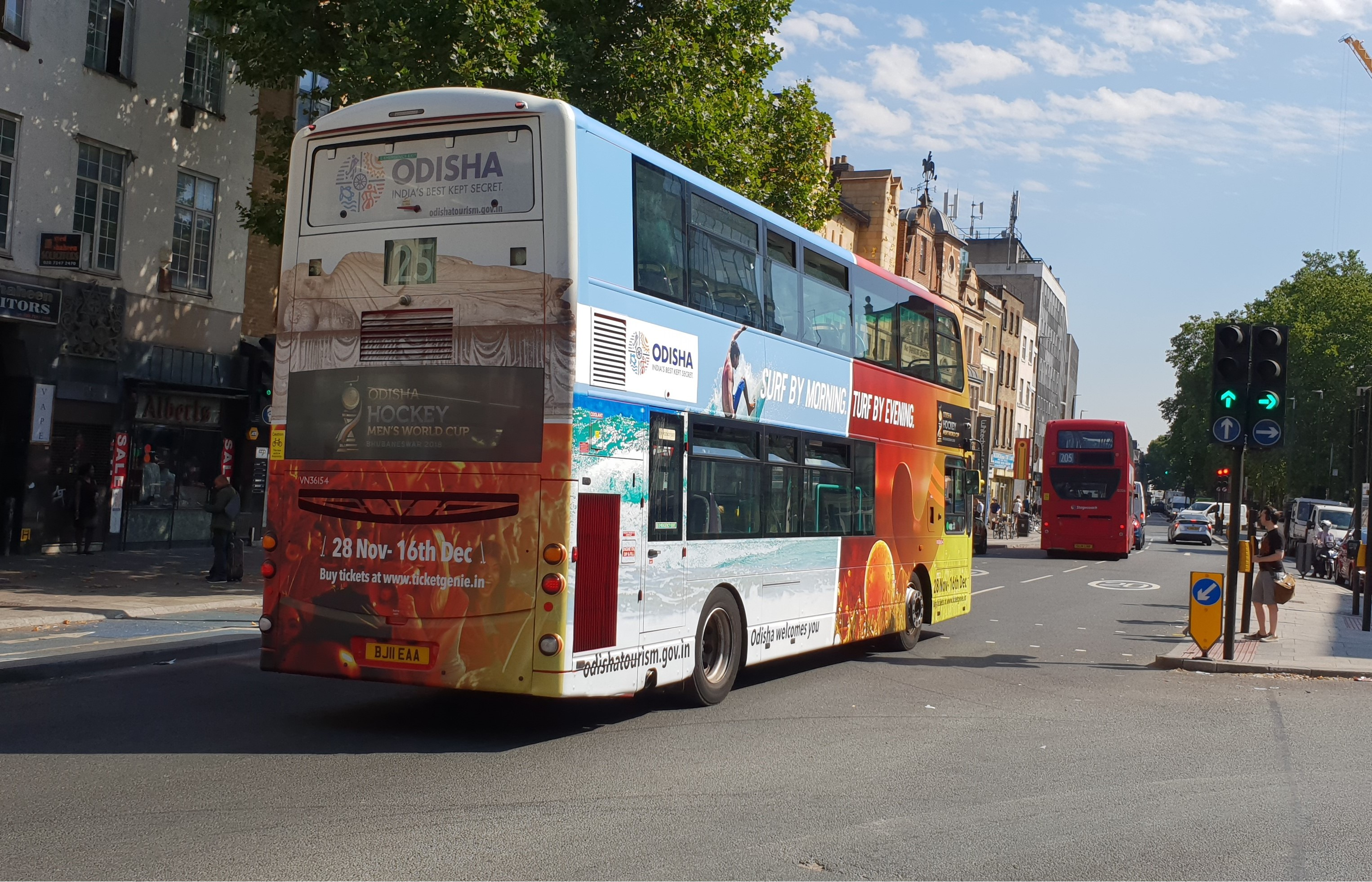

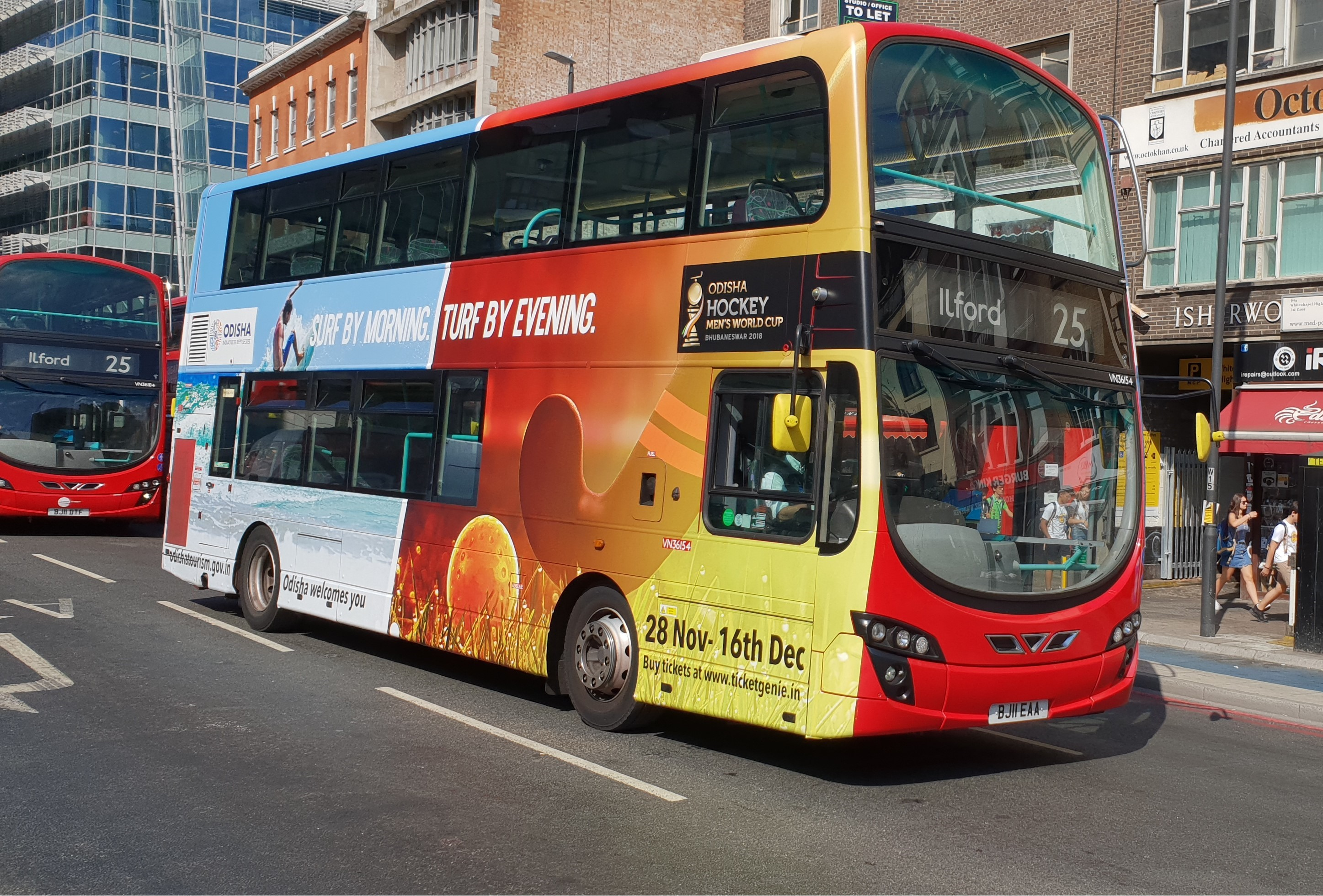

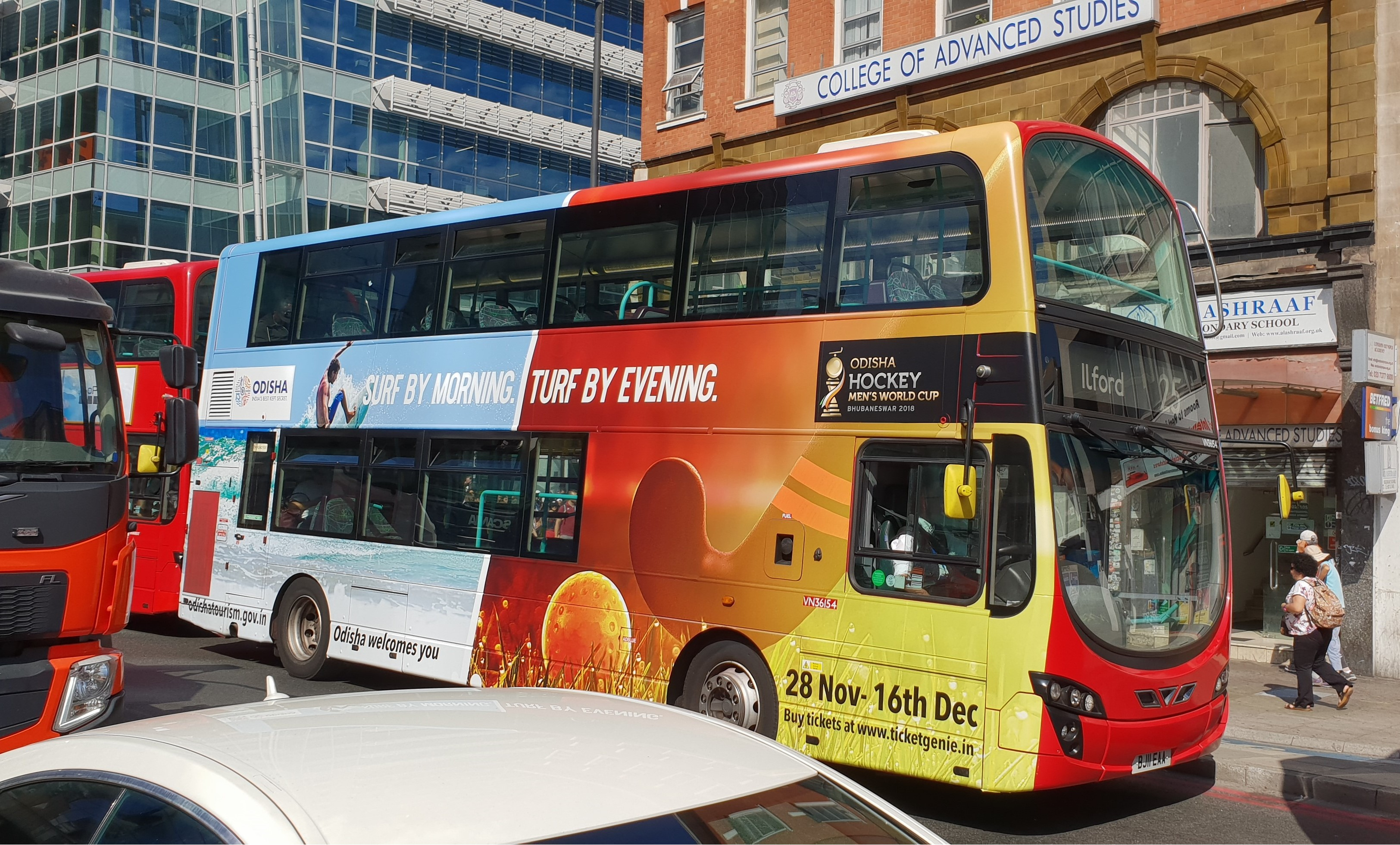

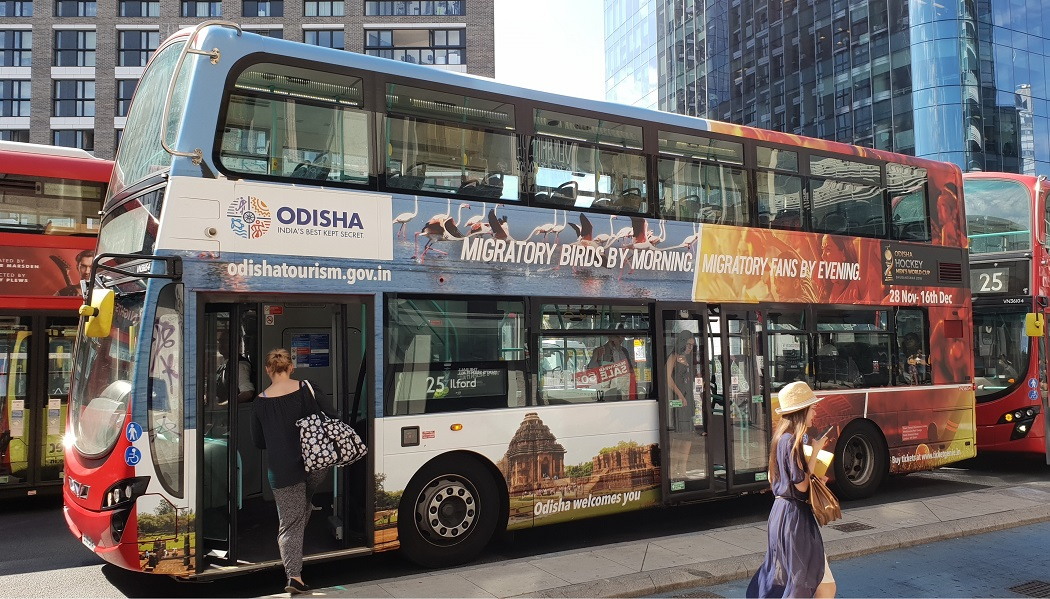
