= HOPS FC =

Indian association football club

HOPS
- Full name: House of Power Soccer Football Club
- Founded: 10 July 2014; 12 years ago
- Ground: Ambedkar Stadium
- Capacity: 35,000
- Owner: Sanjay Yadav
- Head coach: Ravi Kumar Punia
- League: Indian Women's League
- 2025–26: IWL 2, Champions (Promoted)
- Website: hopsfc.com
Home colours	Away colours	Third colours

House of Power Soccer Football Club, known simply as HOPS FC (previously known as South West Delhi FC), is an Indian women's professional football club based in New Delhi, that competes in the Indian Women's League and the Delhi Women's League. It is affiliated with the Football Delhi. The club focuses on promoting and developing women's football, providing opportunities in grassroots, training programs, workshops and tournaments for the underprivileged players at the local level (Delhi NCR). Club is also representing in Men's Format and Wins the Delhi A-Division League 2025-26 Championship organized by Football Delhi in June 2026.

== Squad ==
As of 13 November 2026

Note: Flags indicate national team as defined under FIFA eligibility rules; some limited exceptions apply. Players may hold more than one non-FIFA nationality.

No.	Pos.	Nation	Player
1	GK	IND	Khushi
3	DF	IND	Nandani Kumari
4	FW	IND	Tamanna
5	MF	IND	Heena Khatun
6	MF	IND	Shivani Toppo
8	MF	IND	Pooja
9	FW	IND	Muskan
10	FW	IND	Himanshi
11	MF	IND	Khushbu
12	MF	IND	Elijabed Ekka
13	MF	IND	Khushbu Linda
15	FW	IND	Reena Kumari
16	MF	IND	Mamta
17	MF	IND	Santosh
18	MF	IND	Shailja

No.	Pos.	Nation	Player
19	MF	IND	Vunglawmching
22	DF	IND	Saloni
23	GK	IND	Manisha
25	FW	IND	Shekha Kumari
26	FW	IND	Sabra Khatun
27	DF	IND	Sapna
28	DF	IND	Sonia
30	DF	IND	Ritu
31	GK	IND	Shruti Jadaun
33	DF	IND	Samiksha
36	MF	IND	Shveta Rani

== Technical staff ==
As of 15 October 2026

Position	Name
Head coach	(India) Ravi Kumar Punia
Assistant Coaches	(India) Dinesh Kumar, Gaurav Kumar & Sunita
Club Manager	(India) Krishan Murari
Team manager	(India) Sonika Vijarnia & Renu Bala

== Honours ==
=== Domestic ===
- Indian Women's League 2
  - Champions (1): 2025–26

=== Regional ===
- Delhi A-Division League (Men's)
- Champions (1): 2025–26
- Delhi Women's League
  - Champions (1): 2022–23
  - Runners-Up (1): 2020–21

=== Youth ===
- Women's Youth League (U17)
  - Champions (1): 2026–27
- Women's Youth League (U15)
  - Runners-Up (1): 2026–27
