= Sethu FC =

Indian women's association football club based in Tamil Nadu

Sethu
- Full name: Sethu Football Club
- Founded: 2016; 10 years ago
- Ground: Jawaharlal Nehru Stadium (league matches)
- Capacity: 40,000
- Owner: S. M. Seeni Mohaideen
- Head coach: Kali Alaudeen Nisthar
- League: Indian Women's League
- 2025–26: IWL, 2nd of 8
Home colours	Away colours	Third colours

Sethu Football Club is an Indian women's professional football club based in Madurai, Tamil Nadu, that participates in the Indian Women's League, the top flight of Indian women's football. They won their first IWL in 2018–19 season.

== History ==
The club was founded by S. M. Seeni Mohaideen in 2016, in order to provide a platform for women's footballers of Tamil Nadu to play competitively at the national tiers. With the girls recruited from veteran football coach Mariappan's academy who had earlier represented Jeppiaar Institute, they went to form the core of the team and then of the Tamil Nadu women's football team which won the nationals in 2018. They participated and won the inaugural edition of the Tamil Nadu Women's League in the 2019–20 season.

Sethu made their IWL debut in the 2017–18 season. They won their maiden league title in the 2018–19 season.

== Ground ==
Sethu are based in Madurai, but play their home matches in the top tier league at the Jawaharlal Nehru Stadium at Chennai.

== Squad ==
As of 13 November 2026

Note: Flags indicate national team as defined under FIFA eligibility rules; some limited exceptions apply. Players may hold more than one non-FIFA nationality.

No.	Pos.	Nation	Player
1	GK	IND	Nandini Mattu
2	DF	IND	Purnima Kumari
3	DF	IND	Nirmala Devi Phanjoubam (vice-captain)
4	DF	IND	Dhurga Perumal
5	MF	IND	Sangita Basfore
6	MF	IND	Babina Devi Lisham
7	MF	IND	Sushmita Jadhav
8	MF	IND	Grace Hauhnar
9	FW	IND	Lynda Kom
10	FW	IND	Anwita Raghuraman
11	MF	IND	Malavika Prasad (captain)
12	DF	IND	T. Hoshika
13	DF	IND	Martina Thokchom
14	DF	IND	Naaz Shaikh
15	DF	IND	Lhingneilam Kipgen
16	MF	IND	Sumati Kumari
17	MF	IND	Muskan Subba

No.	Pos.	Nation	Player
18	MF	IND	Yumlam Lali
19	MF	IND	Pushpa Parab
20	FW	IND	Sandhiya Ranganathan
21	GK	IND	Munni Bhambhu
22	DF	IND	Bharti Barot
23	GK	IND	Hempriya Seram
24	FW	IND	Apurna Narzary
26	MF	IND	Babysana Devi Thingbaijam
29	MF	IND	Rivka Ramji
30	FW	GHA	Juanita Aguadze
35	DF	GHA	Emmanuella Adzi
44	MF	IND	Shubhangi Subba
80	FW	GAB	Victoire Biatholi Maimouna

== Personnel ==
=== Technical staff ===
As of 2026

Position	Name
Head coach	(India) Kali Alaudeen Nisthar
Assistant coach	(India) Adnan Syed
Goalkeeping coach	(India) Jeya Prakash J.
Physio	(India) Akshayaa
Team Manager	(India) Priya Tanwar
Head of Operations	(India) Parthiban
Operational manager	(India) Albin
Kit manager	(India) Amrita Das

== Honours ==
=== Domestic ===
- Indian Women's League
  - Champions (1): 2018–19
  - Runners-up (1): 2021–22

=== Regional ===
- Tamil Nadu Women's League
  - Champions (3): 2019–20, 2020–21, 2021–22

=== Youth ===
- Women's Youth League (U15)
  - Champions (1): 2026–27
