= 2024–25 Indian Women's League =

Indian Women's League
- Season: 2024–25
- Dates: 10 January – 18 April 2025
- Champions: East Bengal; 1st title
- Relegated: Odisha; HOPS
- AFC Champions League: East Bengal
- SAFF Club Championship: East Bengal
- Matches: 56
- Goals: 178 (3.18 per match)
- Top goalscorer: Fazila Ikwaput (24 goals)
- Best goalkeeper: Panthoi Chanu Elangbam
- Biggest home win: East Bengal 6–1 HOPS (31 March 2025)
- Biggest away win: Sribhumi 1–5 Gokulam Kerala (20 January 2025)
- Highest scoring: Sribhumi 5–2 HOPS (8 March 2025); East Bengal 6–1 HOPS (31 March 2025)
- Longest winning run: Gokulam Kerala; East Bengal (6 matches)
- Longest unbeaten run: Gokulam Kerala; East Bengal (8 matches)
- Longest winless run: Odisha (9 matches)
- Longest losing run: HOPS (5 matches)
- Highest attendance: 1,920; East Bengal 3–0 Gokulam Kerala (18 April 2025)
- Lowest attendance: 30; Nita 2–0 HOPS (16 March 2025)
- Total attendance: 15,667
- Average attendance: 279

The 2024–25 Indian Women's League was the eighth season of the Indian Women's League, the top division women's professional football league in India. East Bengal won their maiden Indian Women's League title.

== Changes from last season ==
Nine clubs were to compete in the 8th season, seven from the previous season and two promoted from the 2023–24 Indian Women's League 2. In October 2024, Sports Odisha withdrew, leaving the eight participating clubs in the league. AIFF implemented the promotion-relegation system for the IWL tiers from the 2024–25 season.

Promoted from Indian Women's League 2

- Sribhumi ▲
- Nita ▲

Withdrawn

- Sports Odisha

== Clubs ==
=== Stadiums and locations ===
Locations of the Indian Women's League clubs
Location of the Kolkata football clubs

Club	City	State/Region	Stadium	Capacity
East Bengal	Kolkata	West Bengal	East Bengal Ground	23,500
East Bengal	Kolkata	West Bengal	Kalyani Stadium	20,000
Gokulam Kerala	Kozhikode	Kerala	EMS Corporation Stadium	50,000
HOPS	New Delhi	Delhi	Ambedkar Stadium	35,000
Kickstart	Bengaluru	Karnataka	Bangalore Football Stadium	8,400
Nita	Cuttack	Odisha	Capital Football Arena (Note: The club is based in Cuttack but will play its home games in Bhubaneswar for the season.)	1,500
Odisha	Bhubaneswar	Odisha	Kalinga Stadium	15,000
Sethu	Madurai	Tamil Nadu	Jawaharlal Nehru Stadium (Note: The club is based in Madurai but will play its home games in Chennai for the season.)	40,000
Sribhumi	Kolkata	West Bengal	Bibhutibhushan Stadium	5,000

=== Personnel and sponsorships ===
Team	Head coach	Captain	Kit manufacturer	Shirt sponsor
East Bengal	(India) Anthony Andrews	(India) Sweety Devi Ngangbam	Trak Only	Emami
Gokulam Kerala	(India) Ranjan Chowdhury	(India) Ratanbala Devi Nongmaithem	VectorX	CSB Bank, Federal Bank, Kajah Balm
HOPS	(India) Om Prakash Chhibber	(India) Mamta Verma		Dharam Foundation, FWS Logistics
Kickstart	(India) Langam Chaoba Devi	(India) Dalima Chhibber	Sweat	Amagi
Nita	(India) Paromita Sit	(India) Manisa Panna	KTH	Falcon Charity Foundation
Odisha	(India) Crispin Chettri	(India) Pyari Xaxa	Trak Only	Odisha Tourism, GMS, Lila Global
Sethu	(India) Arun Kumar K.	(India) Nirmala Devi Phanjoubam	Hummel	Everrenew, De Shayra Skinz, Cosco, SIT
Sribhumi	(India) Sujata Kar	(India) Bala Devi Ngangom	Trak Only	Senco Gold

=== Managerial changes ===
Team	Outgoing manager	Manner of departure	Date of vacancy	Position in table	Incoming manager	Date of appointment
HOPS	(India) Manoj Joshi	Mutual consent	February 2025	8th	(India) Om Prakash Chhibber	March 2025
Sethu	(India) Shareef Khan A. V.	Mutual consent	March 2025	5th	(India) Arun Kumar K.	March 2025

== Foreign players ==
Teams allowed to register maximum of three foreign players. All three can be part of the starting lineup.

Players name in bold indicates that the player was registered during the mid-season transfer window.

Club	Player 1	Player 2	Player 3	Former player(s)
East Bengal	(Ghana) Elshaddai Acheampong	(Kenya) Maurine Achieng	(Uganda) Resty Nanziri	—
Gokulam Kerala	(Uganda) Fazila Ikwaput	(Kenya) Phoeby Okech	(Uganda) **Sharon Namatovu**	(Kenya) Catherine Aringo
HOPS	(Ghana) Constance Achiaa	(Ghana) Gladys Amfobea	—	—
Kickstart	(Uganda) Joanita Ainembabazi	(Ghana) **Philomena Abakah**	(Bhutan) **Sonam Choden**	(Ghana) Abigail Sakyiwaa (Ghana) Diana Weige
Nita	(Ghana) Rahama Jafaru	(Ghana) Sussana Konadu	(Nigeria) **Regina Olasele**	(Ghana) Gifty Acheampong
Odisha	(Cameroon) Eliane Bodolo	(Nigeria) Maryam Ibrahim	(Ghana) Jennifer Kankam Yeboah	—
Sethu	(Uganda) Amina Nababi	(Uganda) Hadijah Nandago	(Cameroon) Moussa Zouwairatou	—
Sribhumi	(Ghana) Queenable Akousa Amankrah	(Ghana) Regina Antwi	(Ghana) **Sandra Atinga**	—

== League table ==
Pos	Team	Pld	W	D	L	GF	GA	GD	Pts	Qualification or relegation
1	East Bengal (C)	14	12	1	1	38	10	+28	37	Qualification for the Champions League preliminary stage and SAFF Club Championship
2	Gokulam Kerala	14	9	2	3	30	14	+16	29	
3	Sribhumi	14	7	1	6	27	23	+4	22	
4	Kickstart	14	4	6	4	20	20	0	18	
5	Sethu	14	5	2	7	18	23	−5	17	
6	Nita	14	4	2	8	19	33	−14	14	
7	Odisha (R)	14	3	3	8	16	25	−9	12	Relegation to Indian Women's League 2
8	HOPS (R)	14	2	3	9	10	30	−20	9	Relegation to Indian Women's League 2

Source: AIFF
Rules for classification: 1) points; 2) head-to-head points; 3) head-to-head goal difference; 4) goal difference; 5) number of goals scored; 6) drawing of lots
(C) Champions; (R) Relegated

== Results ==
=== Fixtures and results ===
Home \ Away	EAB	GOK	HOP	KFC	NIT	OFC	SFC	SRB
East Bengal		3–0	6–1	2–0	5–1	1–0	3–0	1–0
Gokulam Kerala	3–2		3–0	0–2	4–1	1–1	1–0	3–0
HOPS	1–2	1–0		1–1	0–1	0–2	0–2	0–3
Kickstart	0–2	1–1	1–1		1–2	1–1	2–0	3–2
Nita	1–4	0–2	2–0	4–4		2–1	0–2	1–2
Odisha	1–3	1–3	2–3	2–2	2–0		0–2	0–3
Sethu	2–4	1–4	1–1	0–2	2–2	3–1		1–0
Sribhumi	1–1	1–5	5–2	2–0	4–2	1–2	3–2	

Source: AIFF
Legend: Blue = home team win; Yellow = draw; Red = away team win.

=== Results by match ===
The table lists the results of the teams after each match.

Match	1	2	3	4	5	6	7	8	9	10	11	12	13	14
East Bengal	W	W	W	W	L	W	W	W	W	W	W	D	W	W
Gokulam Kerala	D	D	W	W	W	W	W	W	L	W	W	L	W	L
HOPS	L	L	D	L	L	L	L	L	W	D	L	W	L	D
Kickstart	L	D	D	L	L	D	W	L	W	D	D	W	W	D
Nita	W	D	L	L	W	L	L	W	W	L	L	L	L	D
Odisha	D	W	L	W	W	D	L	L	L	L	D	L	L	L
Sethu	W	D	W	L	W	L	L	L	L	W	L	W	L	D
Sribhumi	L	L	L	W	L	W	W	W	L	L	W	D	W	W

Source: AIFF
W = Win; D = Draw; L = Loss

=== Positions by round ===
The table lists the positions of teams after each round mentioned in official fixtures.

Team ╲ Round	1	2	3	4	5	6	7	8	9	10	11	12	13	14
East Bengal	1	1	1	1	1	1	1	1	1	1	1	1	1	1
Gokulam Kerala	5	5	3	2	2	2	2	2	2	2	2	2	2	2
HOPS	6	8	7	8	8	8	8	8	8	8	8	8	8	8
Kickstart	8	6	6	7	7	7	7	7	7	7	7	5	4	4
Nita	2	3	5	5	5	5	6	6	3	4	5	6	6	6
Odisha	4	2	4	3	3	3	3	4	5	6	6	7	7	7
Sethu	3	4	2	4	4	4	4	5	6	3	4	4	5	5
Sribhumi	7	7	8	6	6	6	5	3	4	5	3	3	3	3

Champions
Relegation

Source: AIFF

== Matches ==
- All times are in IST (UTC+5:30).

=== Round 1 ===
10 January 2025	**East Bengal**	**2–0**	**Kickstart**	Kolkata
14:30	Sandhiya Ranganathan 22'; Resty Nanziri 49'	I-League; PDF Report		Stadium: East Bengal Ground; Attendance: 548; Referee: Neetu Rana; Player of the Match: Sandhiya Ranganathan (East Bengal)

10 January 2025	**Gokulam Kerala**	**1–1**	**Odisha**	Kozhikode
15:30	Hemam Shilky Devi 87'	I-league; PDF Report	Lynda Kom 61'	Stadium: EMS Corporation Stadium; Attendance: 201; Referee: Kanika Barman; Player of the Match: Hemam Shilky Devi (Gokulam Kerala)

11 January 2025	**HOPS**	**0–1**	**Nita**	New Delhi
14:00		I-league; PDF Report	Gifty Acheampong 80'	Stadium: Ambedkar Stadium; Attendance: 350; Referee: Ranjita Devi Tekcham; Player of the Match: Gifty Acheampong (Nita)

11 January 2025	**Sethu**	**1–0**	**Sribhumi**	Chennai
15:30	Amina Nababi 60'	I-league; PDF Report		Stadium: Jawaharlal Nehru Stadium; Attendance: 467; Referee: Pooja S. Player of the Match: Amina Nababi (Sethu)

=== Round 2 ===
15 January 2025	**Kickstart**	**1–1**	**Gokulam Kerala**	Bengaluru
09:00	Sanju Yadav 6'	I-League; PDF Report	Fazila Ikwaput 36'	Stadium: Bangalore Football Stadium; Attendance: 150; Referee: Rachana Hasmukh Kamani; Player of the Match: Sanju Yadav (Kickstart)

15 January 2025	**East Bengal**	**1–0**	**Sribhumi**	Kolkata
14:30	Soumya Guguloth 77'	I-League; PDF Report		Stadium: East Bengal Ground; Attendance: 463; Referee: Ruba Devi G. Player of the Match: Sulanjana Raul (East Bengal)

16 January 2025	**HOPS**	**0–2**	**Odisha**	New Delhi
14:00		I-League; PDF Report	Lynda Kom 66'; Jennifer Yeboah 84'	Stadium: Ambedkar Stadium; Attendance: 150; Referee: Mahi Tudu; Player of the Match: Grace Hauhnar (Odisha)

16 January 2025	**Sethu**	**2–2**	**Nita**	Chennai
15:30	Malavika P. 12', 16'	I-League; PDF Report	Gifty Acheampong 27'; Jabamani Tudu 74'	Stadium: Jawaharlal Nehru Stadium; Attendance: 480; Referee: Neetu Rana; Player of the Match: Malavika P. (Sethu)

=== Round 3 ===
20 January 2025	**Nita**	**1–4**	**East Bengal**	Bhubaneswar
09:00	Gifty Acheampong 61'	I-League; PDF Report	Anju Tamang 30'; Soumya Guguloth 48'; Resty Nanziri 50'; Sandhiya Ranganathan 67'	Stadium: Capital Football Arena; Attendance: 251; Referee: Usha; Player of the Match: Sandhiya Ranganathan (East Bengal)

20 January 2025	**Sribhumi**	**1–5**	**Gokulam Kerala**	Kolkata
15:00	Queenable Akousa Amankrah 38'	I-League; PDF Report	Fazila Ikwaput 1', 41', 56', 72'; Shubhangi Singh 43'	Stadium: Bibhutibhushan Stadium; Attendance: 800; Referee: Sen Hangma Subba; Player of the Match: Fazila Ikwaput (Gokulam Kerala)

21 January 2025	**Kickstart**	**1–1**	**HOPS**	Bengaluru
09:00	Karishma Shirvoikar 15'	I-League; PDF Report	Gladys Amfobea 78'	Stadium: Bangalore Football Stadium; Attendance: 103; Referee: Snigdha Mondal; Player of the Match: Dalima Chhibber (Kickstart)

21 January 2025	**Odisha**	**0–2**	**Sethu**	Bhubaneswar
15:00		I-League; PDF Report	Amina Nababi 69', 82'	Stadium: Kalinga Stadium; Attendance: 223; Referee: Mahi Tudu; Player of the Match: Amina Nababi (Sethu)

=== Round 4 ===
26 January 2025	**Gokulam Kerala**	**3–0**	**HOPS**	Kozhikode
15:30	Fazila Ikwaput 40', 82'; Catherine Amo Aringo 90+4'	I-League; PDF Report		Stadium: EMS Corporation Stadium; Attendance: 338; Referee: Kusum Mandi; Player of the Match: Fazila Ikwaput (Gokulam Kerala)

27 January 2025	**Sribhumi**	**2–0**	**Kickstart**	Kolkata
15:00	Bala Devi 15'; Nameirakpam Arina Devi 90+4'	I-League; PDF Report		Stadium: Bibhutibhushan Stadium; Attendance: 247; Referee: RD Hringnidam; Player of the Match: Bala Devi (Sribhumi)

28 January 2025	**East Bengal**	**3–0**	**Sethu**	Kolkata
14:30	Sandhiya Ranganathan 55'; Maurine Achieng 69'; Soumya Guguloth 80'	I-League; PDF Report		Stadium: East Bengal Ground; Attendance: 700; Referee: Rachana Hasmukh Kamani; Player of the Match: Soumya Guguloth (East Bengal)

28 January 2025	**Odisha**	**2–0**	**Nita**	Bhubaneswar
15:00	Eliane Bodolo 5'; Lynda Kom 43'	I-League; PDF Report		Stadium: Kalinga Stadium; Attendance: 1243; Referee: Ranjita Devi Tekcham; Player of the Match: Lynda Kom (Odisha)

=== Round 5 ===
1 February 2025	**Kickstart**	**1–2**	**Nita**	Bengaluru
09:00	Grace Dangmei 45+3'	I-League; PDF Report	Rahama Jafaru 46', 80'	Stadium: Bangalore Football Stadium; Attendance: 252; Referee: Kusum Mandi; Player of the Match: Rahama Jafaru (Nita)

1 February 2025	**Sribhumi**	**1–2**	**Odisha**	Kolkata
15:00	Queenable Akousa Amankrah 77'	I-League; PDF Report	Jennifer Kankam Yeboah 40'; Lynda Kom 81'	Stadium: Bibhutibhushan Stadium; Attendance: 50; Referee: Neetu Rana; Player of the Match: Lynda Kom (Odisha)

2 February 2025	**HOPS**	**0–2**	**Sethu**	New Delhi
14:00		I-League; PDF Report	Phanjoubam Nirmala Devi 30'; Moussa Zouwairatou 54'	Stadium: Ambedkar Stadium; Attendance: 150; Referee: Snigdha Mondal; Player of the Match: Moussa Zouwairatou (Sethu)

2 February 2025	**Gokulam Kerala**	**3–2**	**East Bengal**	Kozhikode
15:30	Fazila Ikwaput 2', 35', 52' (pen.)	I-League; PDF Report	Resty Nanziri 86', 90+1'	Stadium: EMS Corporation Stadium; Attendance: 102; Referee: Pooja S. Player of the Match: Fazila Ikwaput (Gokulam Kerala)

=== Round 6 ===
6 February 2025	**HOPS**	**0–1**	**East Bengal**	New Delhi
14:00		I-League; PDF Report	Soumya Guguloth 40'	Stadium: Ambedkar Stadium; Attendance: 164; Referee: Sen Hangma Subba; Player of the Match: Soumya Guguloth (East Bengal)

6 February 2025	**Nita**	**1–2**	**Sribhumi**	Bhubaneswar
15:00	Rahama Jafaru 62'	I-League; PDF Report	Bala Devi 11', 24'	Stadium: Capital Football Arena; Attendance: 80; Referee: Rachana Hasmukh Kamani; Player of the Match: Bala Devi (Sreebhumi)

7 February 2025	**Kickstart**	**1–1**	**Odisha**	Bengaluru
09:00	Joanita Ainembabazi 70'	I-League; PDF Report	Lynda Kom 82'	Stadium: Bangalore Football Stadium; Attendance: 178; Referee: Kanika Barman; Player of the Match: Dalima Chhibber (Kickstart)

7 February 2025	**Sethu**	**1–4**	**Gokulam Kerala**	Chennai
15:30	Phanjoubam Nirmala Devi 25'	I-League; PDF Report	Fazila Ikwaput 10', 20', 60', 88'	Stadium: Jawaharlal Nehru Stadium; Attendance: 100; Referee: Usha; Player of the Match: Fazila Ikwaput (Gokulam Kerala)

=== Round 7 ===
6 March 2025	**Sethu**	**0–2**	**Kickstart**	Chennai
15:30		I-League; PDF Report	Philomena Abakah 55'; Renu Gour 90+2'	Stadium: Jawaharlal Nehru Stadium; Attendance: 250; Referee: Kanika Barman; Player of the Match: Renu Gour (Kickstart)

8 March 2025	**Sribhumi**	**5–2**	**HOPS**	Kolkata
15:00	Mousumi Murmu 21', 63', 69', 88'; Nameirakpam Arina Devi 44'	I-League; PDF Report	Debika Tanti 7'; Aarti 67'	Stadium: Bibhutibhushan Stadium; Attendance: 50; Referee: Ruba Devi G Player of the Match: Mousumi Murmu (Sribhumi)

9 March 2025	**Nita**	**0–2**	**Gokulam Kerala**	Bhubaneswar
15:30		I-League; PDF Report	Shubhangi Singh 2'; Hemam Shilky Devi 90+2'	Stadium: Capital Football Arena; Attendance: 245; Referee: Kusum Mandi; Player of the Match: Shubhangi Singh (Gokulam Kerala)

9 March 2025	**Odisha**	**1–3**	**East Bengal**	Bhubaneswar
15:30	Jennifer Kankam Yeboah 74'	I-League; PDF Report	Elshaddai Acheampong 7', 31', 38' (pen.)	Stadium: Kalinga Stadium; Attendance: 72; Referee: Ranjita Devi Tekcham; Player of the Match: Elshaddai Acheampong (East Bengal)

=== Round 8 ===
15 March 2025	**Odisha**	**1–3**	**Gokulam Kerala**	Bhubaneswar
15:30	Neha Sillay 50'	I-League; PDF Report	Pyari Xaxa 32' (o.g.); Fazila Ikwaput 42', 59'	Stadium: Kalinga Stadium; Attendance: 470; Referee: Ruba Devi G Player of the Match: Fazila Ikwaput (Gokulam Kerala)

15 March 2025	**Kickstart**	**0–2**	**East Bengal**	Bengaluru
16:00		I-League; PDF Report	Loitongbam Ashalata Devi 35'; Sulanjana Raul 65'	Stadium: Bangalore Football Stadium; Attendance: 300; Referee: Usha; Player of the Match: Loitongbam Ashalata Devi (East Bengal)

16 March 2025	**Sribhumi**	**3–2**	**Sethu**	Kolkata
15:00	Bala Devi 39', 49' (pen.), 65'	I-League; PDF Report	Hadijah Nandago 37'; Lisham Babina Devi 89'	Stadium: Bibhutibhushan Stadium; Attendance: 217; Referee: Pooja S Player of the Match: Bala Devi (Sribhumi)

16 March 2025	**Nita**	**2–0**	**HOPS**	Bhubaneswar
15:30	Manisha Naik 60', 63'	I-League; PDF Report		Stadium: Capital Football Arena; Attendance: 30; Referee: Mahi Tudu; Player of the Match: Priya Rui Das (Nita)

=== Round 9 ===
20 March 2025	**HOPS**	**1–0**	**Gokulam Kerala**	New Delhi
14:00	Gladys Amfobea 79'	I-League; PDF Report		Stadium: Ambedkar Stadium; Attendance: 50; Referee: Pooja S Player of the Match: Gladys Amfobea (HOPS)

20 March 2025	**Kickstart**	**3–2**	**Sribhumi**	Bengaluru
16:00	Mariyammal Balamurugan 11'; Karishma Shirvoikar 45+3'; Grace Dangmei 63'	I-League; PDF Report	Mousumi Murmu 29'; Rimpa Haldar 52'	Stadium: Bangalore Football Stadium; Attendance: 200; Referee: Sen Hangma Subba; Player of the Match: Rimpa Haldar (Sribhumi)

21 March 2025	**Nita**	**2–1**	**Odisha**	Bhubaneswar
15:30	Rahama Jafaru 72'; Manisha Naik 75'	I-League; PDF Report	Neha Sillay 16'	Stadium: Capital Football Arena; Attendance: 150; Referee: Ruba Devi G Player of the Match: Munica Minz (Nita)

21 March 2025	**Sethu**	**2–4**	**East Bengal**	Chennai
15:30	Amina Nababi 18'; Hadijah Nandago 64'	I-League; PDF Report	Elshaddai Acheampong 9' (pen.), 15'; Resty Nanziri 45+3'; Soumya Guguloth 88'	Stadium: Jawaharlal Nehru Stadium; Attendance: 350; Referee: Ranjita Devi Tekcham; Player of the Match: Elshaddai Acheampong (East Bengal)

=== Round 10 ===
26 March 2025	**East Bengal**	**5–1**	**Nita**	Kolkata
15:30	Elshaddai Acheampong 9', 53' (pen.); Maurine Achieng 65'; Soumya Guguloth 71'; Sulanjana Raul 89'	I-League; PDF Report	Rahama Jafaru 37'	Stadium: Kalyani Stadium; Attendance: 300; Referee: Pooja S Player of the Match: Elshaddai Acheampong (East Bengal)

26 March 2025	**Gokulam Kerala**	**3–0**	**Sribhumi**	Kozhikode
15:30	Fazila Ikwaput 9', 13', 64'	I-League; PDF Report		Stadium: EMS Corporation Stadium; Attendance: 150; Referee: Neetu Rana; Player of the Match: Fazila Ikwaput (Gokulam Kerala)

27 March 2025	**HOPS**	**1–1**	**Kickstart**	New Delhi
14:00	Constance Achiaa 84'	I-League; PDF Report	Renu Gour 10'	Stadium: Ambedkar Stadium; Attendance: 215; Referee: Kanika Barman; Player of the Match: Constance Achiaa (HOPS)

27 March 2025	**Sethu**	**3–1**	**Odisha**	Chennai
15:30	Amina Nababi 7', 13'; Moussa Zouwairatou 41'	I-League; PDF Report	Lynda Kom 90+6'	Stadium: Jawaharlal Nehru Stadium; Attendance: 50; Referee: Kusum Mandi; Player of the Match: T Hoshika (Sethu)

=== Round 11 ===
31 March 2025	**Sribhumi**	**4–2**	**Nita**	Kolkata
15:00	Mousumi Murmu 33', 45+2'; Sandra Atinga 42'; Bala Devi 52'	I-League; PDF Report	Manisha Naik 34'; Juli Kishan 58'	Stadium: Bibhutibhushan Stadium; Attendance: 250; Referee: Ranjita Devi Tekcham; Player of the Match: Mousumi Murmu (Sribhumi)

31 March 2025	**East Bengal**	**6–1**	**HOPS**	Kolkata
16:00	Soumya Guguloth 3'; Sandhiya Ranganathan 7'; Maurine Achieng 11'; Karthika Angamuthu 54'; Resty Nanziri 90+2'; Elshaddai Acheampong 90+3'	I-League; PDF Report	Gladys Amfobea 58'	Stadium: Kalyani Stadium; Attendance: 400; Referee: Sen Hangma Subba; Player of the Match: Resty Nanziri (East Bengal)

1 April 2025	**Gokulam Kerala**	**1–0**	**Sethu**	Kozhikode
15:30	Fazila Ikwaput 14'	I-League; PDF Report		Stadium: EMS Corporation Stadium; Attendance: 360; Referee: Kanika Barman; Player of the Match: Fazila Ikwaput (Gokulam Kerala)

1 April 2025	**Odisha**	**2–2**	**Kickstart**	Bhubaneswar
15:30	Lynda Kom 45'; Jennifer Kankam Yeboah 79'	I-League; PDF Report	Philomena Abakah 52'; Joanitah Ainembazi 56'	Stadium: Kalinga Stadium; Attendance: 50; Referee: Mahi Tudu; Player of the Match: Wangkhem Linthoingambi Devi (Kickstart)

=== Round 12 ===
5 April 2025	**Sribhumi**	**1–1**	**East Bengal**	Kolkata
15:00	Sandra Atinga 88'	I-League; PDF Report	Anju Tamang 82'	Stadium: Bibhutibhushan Stadium; Attendance: 300; Referee: Rachana Hasmukh Kamani; Player of the Match: Resty Nanziri (East Bengal)

5 April 2025	**Gokulam Kerala**	**0–2**	**Kickstart**	Kozhikode
15:30		I-League; PDF Report	Philomena Abakah 7'; Karishma Shirvoikar 51'	Stadium: EMS Corporation Stadium; Attendance: 280; Referee: Ruba Devi G Player of the Match: Karishma Shirvoikar (Kickstart)

6 April 2025	**Nita**	**0–2**	**Sethu**	Bhubaneswar
15:00		I-League; PDF Report	Hadijah Nandago 16'; Amina Nababi 90+3' (pen.)	Stadium: Capital Football Arena; Attendance: 43; Referee: Kusum Mandi; Player of the Match: Hadijah Nandago (Sethu)

6 April 2025	**Odisha**	**2–3**	**HOPS**	Bhubaneswar
16:00	Neha Sillay 14'; Pyari Xaxa 45+1'	I-League; PDF Report	Kiran Pisda 13' (o.g.); Pooja 34', 90'	Stadium: Kalinga Stadium; Attendance: 50; Referee: Ranjita Devi Tekcham; Player of the Match: Kajal (HOPS)

=== Round 13 ===
11 April 2025	**East Bengal**	**1–0**	**Odisha**	Kolkata
16:00	Soumya Guguloth 67'	I-League; PDF Report		Stadium: Kalyani Stadium; Attendance: 367; Referee: Kumari Nandita; Player of the Match: Soumya Guguloth (East Bengal)

12 April 2025	**HOPS**	**0–3**	**Sribhumi**	New Delhi
15:30		I-League; PDF Report	Apurna Narzary 24'; Sandra Atinga 79'; Rimpa Haldar 84'	Stadium: Ambedkar Stadium; Attendance: 250; Referee: Sen Hangma Subba; Player of the Match: Sandra Atinga

12 April 2025	**Kickstart**	**2–0**	**Sethu**	Bengaluru
16:00	Laishram Bibicha Devi 14'; Karishma Shirvoikar 17'	I-League; PDF Report		Stadium: Bangalore Football Stadium; Attendance: 60; Referee: Rachana Hasmukh Kamani

13 April 2025	**Gokulam Kerala**	**4–1**	**Nita**	Kozhikode
16:00	Fazila Ikwaput 47', 52', 63', 82'	I-League; PDF Report	Rahama Jafaru 75'	Stadium: EMS Corporation Stadium; Attendance: 200; Referee: Pooja S Player of the Match: Fazila Ikwaput (Gokulam Kerala)

=== Round 14 ===
16 April 2025	**Sethu**	**1–1**	**HOPS**	Chennai
15:30	Hadijah Nandago 38'	I-League; PDF Report	Gladys Amfobea 45+2'	Stadium: Jawaharlal Nehru Stadium; Attendance: 50; Referee: Kanika Barman; Player of the Match: Gladys Amfobea (HOPS)

16 April 2025	**Odisha**	**0–3**	**Sribhumi**	Bhubaneswar
15:30		I-League; PDF Report	Sibani Devi Nongmeikapam 10', 18', 32'	Stadium: Kalinga Stadium; Attendance: 230; Referee: Pooja S Player of the Match: Sibani Devi Nongmeikapam (Sribhumi)

18 April 2025	**East Bengal**	**3–0**	**Gokulam Kerala**	Kolkata
15:00	Elshaddai Acheampong 27', 37'; Soumya Guguloth 42'	I-League; PDF Report		Stadium: East Bengal Ground; Attendance: 1920; Referee: Ranjita Devi Tekcham

18 April 2025	**Nita**	**4–4**	**Kickstart**	Bhubaneswar
15:30	Yumnam Kamala Devi 14'; Jabamani Tudu 61'; Sussana Konadu 83'; Priya Rui Das 89'	I-League; PDF Report	Grace Dangmei 2'; Philomena Abakah 4'; Karishma Shirvoikar 9'; Sanju Yadav 32'	Stadium: Capital Football Arena; Attendance: 70; Referee: Usha; Player of the Match: Susmita Pun (Nita)

== Season statistics ==
As of 18 April 2025

=== Top scorers ===
Rank	Player	Club	Goals
1	(Uganda) Fazila Ikwaput	Gokulam Kerala	24
2	(Ghana) Elshaddai Acheampong	East Bengal	10
3	(India) Soumya Guguloth	East Bengal	9
4	(India) Bala Devi Ngangom	Sribhumi	7
4	(India) Mousumi Murmu	Sribhumi	7
4	(India) Lynda Kom	Odisha	7
4	(Uganda) Amina Nababi	Sethu	7
8	(Uganda) Resty Nanziri	East Bengal	6
8	(Ghana) Rahama Jafaru	Nita	6
10	(India) Karishma Shirvoikar	Kickstart	5

=== Hat-tricks ===
Player	For	Against	Result	Date
(Uganda) Fazila Ikwaput	Gokulam Kerala	Sribhumi	5–1 (A)	20 January 2025
(Uganda) Fazila Ikwaput	Gokulam Kerala	East Bengal	3–2 (H)	2 February 2025
(Uganda) Fazila Ikwaput	Gokulam Kerala	Sethu	4–1 (A)	7 February 2025
(India) Mousumi Murmu	Sribhumi	HOPS	5–2 (H)	8 March 2025
(Ghana) Elshaddai Acheampong	East Bengal	Odisha	3–1 (A)	9 March 2025
(India) Bala Devi Ngangom	Sribhumi	Sethu	3–2 (H)	16 March 2025
(Uganda) Fazila Ikwaput	Gokulam Kerala	Sribhumi	3–0 (H)	26 March 2025
(Uganda) Fazila Ikwaput	Gokulam Kerala	Nita	4–1 (H)	13 April 2025
(India) Sibani Devi Nongmeikapam	Sribhumi	Odisha	3–0 (A)	16 April 2025

Notes

- (H) – Home team
- (A) – Away team

=== Clean sheets ===
Rank	Player	Club	Clean sheets
1	(India) Panthoi Chanu Elangbam	East Bengal	7
2	(India) Payal Basude	Gokulam Kerala	4
3	(India) Khambi Chanu Sarangthem	Sethu	3
3	(India) Linthoingambi Devi Maibam	Kickstart	3
3	(India) Aditi Chauhan	Sribhumi	3
6	(India) Shreya Hooda	Odisha	2
6	(India) Sasmita Parida	Nita	2
8	(India) Kajal	HOPS	1
8	(India) Gyurme Dolmo Tamang	Sethu	1

=== Discipline ===
==== Player ====
- Most yellow cards: **4**
  - (Ghana) Sussana Konadu
  - (India) K. Ngopawdi
  - (Uganda) Fazila Ikwaput
- Most red cards: **1**
  - (India) Anu Sabu
  - (Kenya) Phoeby Okech
  - (Ghana) Sussana Konadu

==== Club ====
- Most yellow cards: **4**
  - Sethu
- Most red cards: **1**
  - Sethu

== Awards ==
=== Match awards ===
Player of the Match
Match No.	Player	Club	Match No.	Player	Club	Match No.	Player	Club
1	(India) Sandhiya Ranganathan	East Bengal	2	(India) Hemam Shilky Devi	Gokulam Kerala	3	(Ghana) Gifty Acheampong	Nita
4	(Uganda) Amina Nababi	Sethu	5	(India) Sanju Yadav	Kickstart	6	(India) Sulanjana Raul	East Bengal
7	(India) Grace Hauhnar	Odisha	8	(India) Malavika P.	Sethu	9	(India) Sandhiya Ranganathan	East Bengal
10	(Uganda) Fazila Ikwaput	Gokulam Kerala	11	(India) Dalima Chhibber	Kickstart	12	(Uganda) Amina Nababi	Sethu
13	(Uganda) Fazila Ikwaput	Gokulam Kerala	14	(India) Bala Devi	Sribhumi	15	(India) Soumya Guguloth	East Bengal
16	(India) Lynda Kom	Odisha	17	(Ghana) Rahama Jafaru	NIta	18	(India) Lynda Kom	Odisha
19	(Cameroon) Moussa Zouwairatou	Sethu	20	(Uganda) Fazila Ikwaput	Gokulam Kerala	21	(India) Soumya Guguloth	East Bengal
22	(India) Bala Devi	Sribhumi	23	(India) Dalima Chhibber	Kickstart	24	(Uganda) Fazila Ikwaput	Gokulam Kerala
25	(India) Renu Gour	Kickstart	26	(India) Mousumi Murmu	Sribhumi	27	(India) Shubhangi Singh	Gokulam Kerala
28	(Ghana) Elshaddai Acheampong	East Bengal	29	(Uganda) Fazila Ikwaput	Gokulam Kerala	30	(India) Loitongbam Ashalata Devi	East Bengal
31	(India) Bala Devi	Sribhumi	32	(India) Priya Rui Das	Nita	33	(Ghana) Gladys Amfobea	HOPS
34	(India) Rimpa Haldar	Sribhumi	35	(Ghana) Elshaddai Acheampong	East Bengal	36	(India) Munica Minz	Nita
37	(Ghana) Elshaddai Acheampong	East Bengal	38	(Uganda) Fazila Ikwaput	Gokulam Kerala	39	(Ghana) Constance Achiaa	HOPS
40	(India) T Hoshika	Sethu	41	(India) Mousumi Murmu	Sribhumi	42	(Uganda) Resty Nanziri	East Bengal
43	(Uganda) Fazila Ikwaput	Gokulam Kerala	44	(India) Wangkhem Linthoingambi Devi	Kickstart	45	(Uganda) Resty Nanziri	East Bengal
46	(India) Karishma Shirvoikar	Kickstart	47	(Uganda) Hadijah Nandago	Sethu	48	(India) Kajal	HOPS
49	(India) Soumya Guguloth	East Bengal	50	(Ghana) Sandra Atinga	Sribhumi	51	No award	
52	(Uganda) Fazila Ikwaput	Gokulam Kerala	53	(Ghana) Gladys Amfobea	HOPS	54	(India) Sibani Devi Nongmeikapam	Sribhumi
55	No award		56	(India) Susmita Pun	Nita			

=== Season awards ===
The following awards will be given at the conclusion of the season:

Award	Winner	Club
Best Striker	(Uganda) Fazila Ikwaput	Gokulam Kerala
Best Goalkeeper	(India) Panthoi Chanu Elangbam	East Bengal
Best Defender	(India) Purnima Kumari	Sethu
Best Midfielder	(India) Shilky Devi Hemam	Gokulam Kerala
Best Match Organisation	Gokulam Kerala	
Best Media Activities	East Bengal	

== See also ==
- **Women**
  - 2024–25 Indian Women's League 2
- **Men**
  - 2024–25 Indian Super League
  - 2024–25 I-League
  - 2024–25 I-League 2
  - 2024–25 I-League 3
  - 2024 Durand Cup
  - 2025 Super Cup (April)
