= 2024–25 Gokulam Kerala FC (Women) season =

2024–25 season of Gokulam Kerala FC (Women)

Gokulam Kerala
2024-25 season
- Owner: Sree Gokulam Group
- Chairman President: Gokulam Gopalan; V. C. Praveen
- Head coach: Ranjan Chowdhury
- Stadium: EMS Stadium
- Indian Women's League: 2nd
- Top goalscorer: League: Fazila Ikwaput (24); All: Fazila Ikwaput (24)
- Highest home attendance: 360 vs Sethu (1 April 2025)
- Lowest home attendance: 102 vs East Bengal (2 February 2025)
- Average home league attendance: 233
- Biggest win: 1–5 (vs Sribhumi, 20 January 2025)
- Biggest defeat: 3-0 (vs East Bengal, 18 April 2025)
- All statistics correct as of 22 April 2025.

The 2024–25 season was Gokulam Kerala's seventh season since its establishment in 2018 and their seventh participation in the Indian Women's League (IWL). The club finished as runners-up, with their title hopes ending after a late-season defeat to Kickstart FC and a 3–0 loss to eventual champions East Bengal FC on the final day.

== Current technical staff ==
Position	Name
Head coach	(India) Ranjan Chowdhury
Assistant coach	(India) Rutuja Gunwant
Fitness and conditioning coach	(India)
Technical director	(India) Ranjan Chowdhury
Goalkeeping coach	(India) Aadil Ansari
Team manager	(India) Azlam Shafi
Team analyst	(India) Anjitha

== First-team squad ==
As of 8 March 2025

Note: Flags indicate national team as defined under FIFA eligibility rules; some limited exceptions apply. Players may hold more than one non-FIFA nationality.

No.	Pos.	Nation	Player
1	GK	IND	Payal Basude
2	DF	IND	Thounaojam Kritina Devi
3	DF	IND	Dhurga P.
4	DF	IND	Hemam Shilky Devi
6	DF	IND	Martina Thokchom
7	MF	IND	Nongmaithem Ratanbala Devi (captain)
10	FW	UGA	Fazila Ikwaput
11	FW	IND	Manasa K.
12	DF	IND	Asem Roja Devi
13	DF	KEN	Phoeby Okech
15	MF	IND	Soniya Jose
16	DF	IND	Shubhangi Singh
17	MF	IND	Muskan Subba
18	MF	IND	Harmilan Kaur

No.	Pos.	Nation	Player
20	FW	IND	Greeshma M. P.
22	FW	IND	Arathy P. M.
23	FW	IND	Heigrujam Daya Devi
31	GK	IND	Anitha S.
32	GK	IND	Aleena James
42	MF	IND	Baby Lalchhandami
55	DF	IND	Alexiba Samson
70	MF	IND	Huidrom Ranjita Devi
71	FW	IND	Mahalakshmi
77	FW	IND	R. Darshini Devi
88	DF	IND	Pranita Nimkar
90	FW	UGA	Sharon Namatovu
98	MF	IND	Harshika Jain
99	DF	IND	Th Sahena

== Competitions ==
=== Overview ===
Competition	First match	Last match	Starting round	Final position	Record							
Competition	First match	Last match	Starting round	Final position	Pld	W	D	L	GF	GA	GD	Win %
IWL	10 January 2025	18 April 2025	Match Day 1	2nd	14	9	2	3	30	14	+16	64.29
Total					14	9	2	3	30	14	+16	64.29

Last updated: 18 April 2025
Source: Competitions

=== I-League ===
==== League table ====
Pos	Team	Pld	W	D	L	GF	GA	GD	Pts	Qualification or relegation
1	East Bengal (C)	14	12	1	1	38	10	+28	37	Qualification for the Champions League preliminary stage and SAFF Club Championship
2	Gokulam Kerala	14	9	2	3	30	14	+16	29	
3	Sribhumi	14	7	1	6	27	23	+4	22	
4	Kickstart	14	4	6	4	20	20	0	18	
5	Sethu	14	5	2	7	18	23	−5	17	

Source: AIFF
Rules for classification: 1) points; 2) head-to-head points; 3) head-to-head goal difference; 4) goal difference; 5) number of goals scored; 6) drawing of lots
(C) Champions

==== Results by round ====
Round	1	2	3	4	5	6	7	8	9	10	11	12	13	14
Ground	H	A	A	H	H	A	A	A	A	H	H	H	H	A
Result	D	D	W	W	W	W	W	W	L	W	W	L	W	L
Position	5	5	3	2	2	2	2	2	2	2	2	2	2	2
Points	1	2	5	8	11	14	17	20	20	23	26	26	29	29

Updated to match(es) played on 18 April 2025. Source:
A = Away; H = Home; W = Win; D = Draw; L = Loss

==== Matches ====
Note: AIFF announced the fixtures for the 2024–25 season on 28 October 2024.

10 January 2025 1	Gokulam Kerala	1-1	Odisha	Kozhikode
16.00 IST	Lynda Kom 87'	Report	Hemam Shilky Devi 61'	Stadium: EMS Stadium; Attendance: 201; Referee: Kanila Barman; Man of the Match: Hemam Shilky Devi(Gokulam Kerala)

15 January 2025 2	Kickstart	1-1	Gokulam Kerala	Bengaluru
09.00 IST	6'	Report	Fazila Ikwaput 36'	Stadium: Bangalore Football Stadium

20 January 2025 3	Sreebhumi	1-5	Gokulam Kerala	Kolkata
15.00 IST	Queenable Akousa 38'	Report	Fazila Ikwaput 1', 41', 56', 72'; Shubhangi Singh 43'	Stadium: Bibhutibhushan Stadium; Attendance: 800; Referee: Sen Hangma Subba; Man of the Match: Fazila Ikwaput

26 January 2025 4	Gokulam Kerala	3-0	HOPS	Kozhikode
16.00 IST	Fazila Ikwaput 40', 82'; Catherine Aringo 90+4'	Report		Stadium: EMS Stadium; Attendance: 338; Referee: Kusum Mandi; Man of the Match: Fazila Ikwaput

2 February 2025 5	Gokulam Kerala	3-2	East Bengal	Kozhikode
16.00 IST	Fazila Ikwaput 2', 35', 52' (pen.)	Report	Resty Nanziri 86', 90+1'	Stadium: EMS Stadium; Attendance: 102; Referee: Pooja S Man of the Match: Fazila Ikwaput

7 February 2025 6	Sethu	1-4	Gokulam Kerala	Chennai
15.30 IST	Phanjoubam Nirmala Devi 25'	Report	Fazila Ikwaput 10', 20', 60', 88'	Stadium: Jawaharlal Nehru Stadium; Attendance: 100; Referee: Usha; Man of the Match: Payal Basude

9 March 2025 7	Nita	0-2	Gokulam Kerala	Bhubaneswar
09.00 IST		Report	Shubhangi Singh 2'; Hemam Shilky Devi 90+2'	Stadium: Capital Football Arena; Attendance: 245; Referee: Kusum Mandi; Man of the Match: Shubhangi Singh

15 March 2025 8	Odisha	1-3	Gokulam Kerala	Bhubaneswar
15.00 IST	Neha Sillay 50'	Report	Pyari Xaxa 32' (o.g.); Fazila Ikwaput 45', 55'	Stadium: Kalinga Stadium; Attendance: 470; Referee: Ruba Devi G Man of the Match: Fazila Ikwaput

20 March 2025 9	HOPS	1-0	Gokulam Kerala	Delhi
14.00 IST				Stadium: Ambedkar Stadium

26 March 2025 10	Gokulam Kerala	3-0	Sreebhumi	Kozhikode
16.00 IST	Fazila Ikwaput 9', 13', 64'	Report		Stadium: EMS Stadium; Attendance: 150; Referee: Neetu Rana; Man of the Match: Fazila Ikwaput

1 April 2025 11	Gokulam Kerala	1-0	Sethu	Kozhikode
16.00 IST	Fazila Ikwaput 14'	Report		Stadium: EMS Stadium; Attendance: 360; Referee: Kanika Barman; Man of the Match: Fazila Ikwaput

5 April 2025 12	Gokulam Kerala	0-2	Kickstart	Kozhikode
16.00 IST				Stadium: EMS Stadium

13 April 2025 13	Gokulam Kerala	4-1	Nita	Kozhikode
16.00 IST	Fazila Ikwaput 47', 52', 63', 75'			Stadium: EMS Stadium; Man of the Match: Fazila Ikwaput

18 April 2025 14	East Bengal	3-0	Gokulam Kerala	Kolkata
15.00 IST				Stadium: East Bengal Ground

== Statistics ==
=== Goal scorers ===
Rank	No.	Pos.	Nat.	Name	IWL	Total
1	10	FW	(Uganda)	Fazila Ikwaput	24	24
2	4	MF	(India)	Hemam Shilky Devi	2	2
2	16	DF	(India)	Shubhangi Sing	2	2
4	25	FW	(Kenya)	Catherine Aringo	1	1
Own Goals					1	1
Total					30	30

=== Clean sheets ===
No.	Nation	Name	IWL	Total
1	(India)	Payal Basude	4	4
