= Win Theingi Tun =

Burmese footballer (born 1995)

Personal information
- Full name: Win Theingi Tun
- Date of birth: 1 February 1995 (age 31)
- Place of birth: Kyauktan, Myanmar
- Height: 1.65 m (5 ft 5 in)
- Position: Forward

Team information
- Current team: Yadanarbon

Senior career*
Years	Team	Apps	(Gls)
2016–2019	Myawady	26	(87)
2021–2022	Gokulam Kerala	6	(5)
2022	Lords FA	9	(51)
2022	Thitsar Arman	4	(13)
2023	College of Asian Scholars	10	(13)
2023–2024	Odisha	12	(7)
2024	Yangon United	18	(7)
2025	Sabah FA	12	(25)
2026	Yadanarbon	9	(6)
2026	Ayeyawady W.F.C.	0	(0)

International career
2014–	Myanmar	90	(85)
Medal record
Women's football
Representing Myanmar
Women's Gold Cup
Gold medal – first place	2019 Bhubaneswar
AFF Women's Championship
Silver medal – second place	2015 Ho Chi Minh City
Bronze medal – third place	2016 Mandalay
Bronze medal – third place	2019 Chonburi
Bronze medal – third place	2022 Philippines
SEA Games
Silver medal – second place	2023 Phnom Penh
Bronze medal – third place	2017 Kuala Lumpur
Bronze medal – third place	2019 Philippines
- * Club domestic league appearances and goals

Win Theingi Tun (Burmese: ဝင်းသိင်္ဂီထွန်း; born 1 February 1995) is a Burmese women's professional footballer who plays as a forward for Yadanarbon W.F.C. and the Myanmar national team.

She is ranked 18th in the list of top international women's football goalscorers by country, and is the current all-time top scorer of Myanmar Women League and Indian Women's League.

== Club career ==
=== Myawady ===
Win Theingi Tun played for Burmese club Myawady from 2016 to 2019. She became the Myanmar Women League's all-time top scorer with 87 goals.

=== Gokulam Kerala FC ===
Win Theingi Tun played for Indian club Gokulam Kerala from October 2021 to May 2022, scoring 18 goals in 9 games.

=== Lords FA ===
On 11 August 2022, Win Theingi Tun moved from Gokulam Kerala to Lords FA on a three-month contract; she was the first Burmese female player to play abroad. Lords FA, who were competing in the 2022–23 Kerala Women's League, played against Bosco FA in their season opener on 11 August; they won the match 12–2, with Win Theingi Tun coming on as a starter and scoring four goals.

She set a new record as she scored 11 goals for Lords FA in their 33–1 win against Kadathanad Raja on 17 September. In the following match, Win Theingi Tun scored 15 goals and assisted 5 against SBFA Poovar on September 25, breaking her previous record of 11 goals in 1 match.

=== Thitsar Arman ===
On 2022, She returned to Myanmar, scoring 13 goals in 4 games for Thitsar Arman. She became the Myanmar Women League's all-time top scorer with 100 goals.

== International career ==
Win Theingi Tun debuted for the Myanmar women's national football team in 2014.

== Career statistics ==
=== Club ===
Appearances and goals by club, season and competition
Club	Season	League			National cup		Continental		Total	
Club	Season	Division	Apps	Goals	Apps	Goals	Apps	Goals	Apps	Goals
Myawady	2016–17	Myanmar Women League	8	21	—		—		8	21
Myawady	2017–18	Myanmar Women League	9	46	—		—		9	46
Myawady	2018–19	Myanmar Women League	9	20	—		—		9	20
Myawady	Total		26	87	—		—		26	87
Gokulam Kerala	2021–22	Kerala Women's League	6	18	—		3	0	9	18
Lords FA	2022–23	Kerala Women's League	9	51	—		—		9	51
Thitsar Arman	2022	Myanmar Women League	4	13	—		—		4	13
BG Bundit Asia	2023	Thai Women's League	10	13	—		—		10	13
Odisha	2023-24	Indian Women's League	12	7	0	0	0	0	12	7
Yangon United	2024	Myanmar Women's League	18	7	0	0	0	0	18	7
Sabah	2024	Liga Wanita	0	0	0	0	2	2	2	2
Sabah	2025	Liga Wanita	12	25	0	0	0	0	12	25
Sabah	Total		12	25	0	0	2	2	14	25
Yadanarbon	2026	Myanmar Women's League	9	6	0	0	0	0	9	6
Ayeyawady	2026	Myanmar Women's League	0	0	0	0	3	3	3	3
Career total			106	227	0	0	8	5	114	232

=== International ===
Appearances and goals by national team and year
National team	Year	Apps	Goals
Myanmar	2014	0	0
Myanmar	2015	10	9
Myanmar	2016	7	8
Myanmar	2017	13	14
Myanmar	2018	11	10
Myanmar	2019	11	14
Myanmar	2020	1	1
Myanmar	2021	3	3
Myanmar	2022	8	5
Myanmar	2023	7	3
Myanmar	2024	2	2
Total		73	69

Goals by opponent
Opponent	Goals
India	8
Vietnam	8
Indonesia	6
Thailand	6
Malaysia	5
Sri Lanka	5
Syria	5
Timor-Leste	5
Nepal	4
Philippines	4
Singapore	3
Bangladesh	2
Cambodia	2
Guam	2
Iran	2
Laos	1
Lebanon	1
Total	69

Scores and results list Myanmar's goal tally first, score column indicates score after each Win Theingi Tun goal.

List of international goals scored by Win Theingi Tun
No.	Date	Venue	Opponent	Score	Result	Competition
1.	11 March 2015	Mandalarthiri Stadium, Mandalay, Myanmar	Sri Lanka	8–0	16–0	2016 AFC Women's Olympic Qualifying Tournament
2.	11 March 2015	Mandalarthiri Stadium, Mandalay, Myanmar	Sri Lanka	10–0	16–0	2016 AFC Women's Olympic Qualifying Tournament
3.	11 March 2015	Mandalarthiri Stadium, Mandalay, Myanmar	Sri Lanka	13–0	16–0	2016 AFC Women's Olympic Qualifying Tournament
4.	11 March 2015	Mandalarthiri Stadium, Mandalay, Myanmar	Sri Lanka	15–0	16–0	2016 AFC Women's Olympic Qualifying Tournament
5.	11 March 2015	Mandalarthiri Stadium, Mandalay, Myanmar	Sri Lanka	16–0	16–0	2016 AFC Women's Olympic Qualifying Tournament
6.	15 March 2015	Mandalarthiri Stadium, Mandalay, Myanmar	India	7–0	7–0	2016 AFC Women's Olympic Qualifying Tournament
7.	6 May 2015	Thống Nhất Stadium, Hồ Chí Minh City, Vietnam	Malaysia	1–0	4–0	2015 AFF Women's Championship
8.	6 May 2015	Thống Nhất Stadium, Hồ Chí Minh City, Vietnam	Malaysia	2–0	4–0	2015 AFF Women's Championship
9.	10 May 2015	Thống Nhất Stadium, Hồ Chí Minh City, Vietnam	Thailand	2–3	2–3	2015 AFF Women's Championship
10.	27 July 2016	Mandalarthiri Stadium, Mandalay, Myanmar	Timor-Leste	1–0	17–0	2016 AFF Women's Championship
11.	27 July 2016	Mandalarthiri Stadium, Mandalay, Myanmar	Timor-Leste	3–0	17–0	2016 AFF Women's Championship
12.	27 July 2016	Mandalarthiri Stadium, Mandalay, Myanmar	Timor-Leste	4–0	17–0	2016 AFF Women's Championship
13.	27 July 2016	Mandalarthiri Stadium, Mandalay, Myanmar	Timor-Leste	11–0	17–0	2016 AFF Women's Championship
14.	27 July 2016	Mandalarthiri Stadium, Mandalay, Myanmar	Timor-Leste	16–0	17–0	2016 AFF Women's Championship
15.	29 July 2016	Mandalarthiri Stadium, Mandalay, Myanmar	Malaysia	2–1	2–1	2016 AFF Women's Championship
16.	2 August 2016	Mandalarthiri Stadium, Mandalay, Myanmar	Vietnam	1–2	3–3 (a.e.t.) (4–5 p)	2016 AFF Women's Championship
17.	2 August 2016	Mandalarthiri Stadium, Mandalay, Myanmar	Vietnam	2–2	3–3 (a.e.t.) (4–5 p)	2016 AFF Women's Championship
18.	3 April 2017	Vietnam YTF Center, Hanoi, Vietnam	Iran	2–0	2–0	2018 AFC Women's Asian Cup qualification
19.	7 April 2017	Vietnam YTF Center, Hanoi, Vietnam	Syria	3–0	14–0	2018 AFC Women's Asian Cup qualification
20.	7 April 2017	Vietnam YTF Center, Hanoi, Vietnam	Syria	4–0	14–0	2018 AFC Women's Asian Cup qualification
21.	7 April 2017	Vietnam YTF Center, Hanoi, Vietnam	Syria	5–0	14–0	2018 AFC Women's Asian Cup qualification
22.	7 April 2017	Vietnam YTF Center, Hanoi, Vietnam	Syria	8–0	14–0	2018 AFC Women's Asian Cup qualification
23.	7 April 2017	Vietnam YTF Center, Hanoi, Vietnam	Syria	9–0	14–0	2018 AFC Women's Asian Cup qualification
24.	9 April 2017	Vietnam YTF Center, Hanoi, Vietnam	Singapore	3–0	6–0	2018 AFC Women's Asian Cup qualification
25.	9 April 2017	Vietnam YTF Center, Hanoi, Vietnam	Singapore	6–0	6–0	2018 AFC Women's Asian Cup qualification
26.	15 August 2017	UM Arena Stadium, Kuala Lumpur, Malaysia	Thailand	1–0	2–3	2017 Southeast Asian Games
27.	15 August 2017	UM Arena Stadium, Kuala Lumpur, Malaysia	Thailand	2–2	2–3	2017 Southeast Asian Games
28.	17 August 2017	UiTM Stadium, Shah Alam, Malaysia	Malaysia	2–0	5–0	2017 Southeast Asian Games
29.	17 August 2017	UiTM Stadium, Shah Alam, Malaysia	Malaysia	4–0	5–0	2017 Southeast Asian Games
30.	20 August 2017	UM Arena Stadium, Kuala Lumpur, Malaysia	Vietnam	1–1	1–3	2017 Southeast Asian Games
31.	22 August 2017	UM Arena Stadium, Kuala Lumpur, Malaysia	Philippines	2–0	6–0	2017 Southeast Asian Games
32.	1 July 2018	Gelora Sriwijaya Stadium, Palembang, Indonesia	Philippines	3–0	4–0	2018 AFF Women's Championship
33.	5 July 2018	Gelora Sriwijaya Stadium, Palembang, Indonesia	Indonesia	1–0	6–1	2018 AFF Women's Championship
34.	5 July 2018	Gelora Sriwijaya Stadium, Palembang, Indonesia	Indonesia	2–0	6–1	2018 AFF Women's Championship
35.	5 July 2018	Gelora Sriwijaya Stadium, Palembang, Indonesia	Indonesia	4–0	6–1	2018 AFF Women's Championship
36.	5 July 2018	Gelora Sriwijaya Stadium, Palembang, Indonesia	Indonesia	5–0	6–1	2018 AFF Women's Championship
37.	9 July 2018	Gelora Sriwijaya Stadium, Palembang, Indonesia	Vietnam	1–4	3–4	2018 AFF Women's Championship
38.	9 July 2018	Gelora Sriwijaya Stadium, Palembang, Indonesia	Vietnam	2–4	3–4	2018 AFF Women's Championship
39.	8 November 2018	Thuwunna Stadium, Yangon, Myanmar	Bangladesh	1–0	5–0	2020 AFC Women's Olympic Qualifying Tournament
40.	8 November 2018	Thuwunna Stadium, Yangon, Myanmar	Bangladesh	2–0	5–0	2020 AFC Women's Olympic Qualifying Tournament
41.	13 November 2018	Thuwunna Stadium, Yangon, Myanmar	India	1–0	2–1	2020 AFC Women's Olympic Qualifying Tournament
42.	9 February 2019	Kalinga Stadium, Bhubaneswar, India	Nepal	2–0	3–0	2019 Women's Gold Cup
43.	13 February 2019	Kalinga Stadium, Bhubaneswar, India	India	2–0	2–0	2019 Women's Gold Cup
44.	15 February 2019	Kalinga Stadium, Bhubaneswar, India	Nepal	2–1	3–1	2019 Women's Gold Cup
45.	23 March 2019	Mandalarthiri Stadium, Mandalay, Myanmar	Vietnam	2–2	3–2	Friendly
46.	23 March 2019	Mandalarthiri Stadium, Mandalay, Myanmar	Vietnam	3–2	3–2	Friendly
47.	3 April 2019	Mandalarthiri Stadium, Mandalay, Myanmar	Nepal	2–1	3–1	2020 AFC Women's Olympic Qualifying Tournament
48.	3 April 2019	Mandalarthiri Stadium, Mandalay, Myanmar	Nepal	3–1	3–1	2020 AFC Women's Olympic Qualifying Tournament
49.	6 April 2019	Mandalarthiri Stadium, Mandalay, Myanmar	Indonesia	3–0	6–0	2020 AFC Women's Olympic Qualifying Tournament
50.	9 April 2019	Mandalarthiri Stadium, Mandalay, Myanmar	India	1–1	3–3	2020 AFC Women's Olympic Qualifying Tournament
51.	9 April 2019	Mandalarthiri Stadium, Mandalay, Myanmar	India	2–1	3–3	2020 AFC Women's Olympic Qualifying Tournament
52.	9 April 2019	Mandalarthiri Stadium, Mandalay, Myanmar	India	3–3	3–3	2020 AFC Women's Olympic Qualifying Tournament
53.	16 August 2019	IPE Chonburi Stadium 1, Chonburi, Thailand	Indonesia	5–0	7–0	2019 AFF Women's Championship
54.	18 August 2019	IPE Chonburi Stadium 1, Chonburi, Thailand	Cambodia	4–0	10–1	2019 AFF Women's Championship
55.	18 August 2019	IPE Chonburi Stadium 1, Chonburi, Thailand	Cambodia	9–1	10–1	2019 AFF Women's Championship
56.	25 January 2020	Mandalarthiri Stadium, Mandalay, Myanmar	Thailand	1–2	1–2	Friendly
57.	18 October 2021	Dolen Omurzakov Stadium, Bishkek, Kyrgyzstan	Lebanon	1–0	4–0	2022 AFC Women's Asian Cup qualification
58.	21 October 2021	Dolen Omurzakov Stadium, Bishkek, Kyrgyzstan	Guam	1–0	8–0	2022 AFC Women's Asian Cup qualification
59.	21 October 2021	Dolen Omurzakov Stadium, Bishkek, Kyrgyzstan	Guam	8–0	8–0	2022 AFC Women's Asian Cup qualification
60.	28 January 2022	DY Patil Stadium, Navi Mumbai, India	Vietnam	1–0	2–2	2022 AFC Women's Asian Cup
61.	10 May 2022	Cẩm Phả Stadium, Cẩm Phả, Vietnam	Laos	1–0	3–0	2021 Southeast Asian Games
62.	13 May 2022	Cẩm Phả Stadium, Cẩm Phả, Vietnam	Thailand	1–1	1–1	2021 Southeast Asian Games
63.	15 May 2022	Cẩm Phả Stadium, Cẩm Phả, Vietnam	Singapore	1–0	1–0	2021 Southeast Asian Games
64.	21 May 2022	Cẩm Phả Stadium, Cẩm Phả, Vietnam	Philippines	1–0	1–2	2021 Southeast Asian Games
65.	8 April 2023	Thuwunna Stadium, Yangon, Myanmar	Iran	1–1	1–1	2024 AFC Women's Olympic Qualifying Tournament
66.	3 May 2023	RCAF Old Stadium, Phnom Penh, Cambodia	Philippines	1–0	1–0	2023 Southeast Asian Games
67.	12 May 2023	RCAF Old Stadium, Phnom Penh, Cambodia	Thailand	2–2	4–2	2023 Southeast Asian Games
68.	9 July 2024	Thuwunna Stadium, Yangon, Myanmar	India	1–0	2–1	Friendly
69.	12 July 2024	Thuwunna Stadium, Yangon, Myanmar	India	1–1	1–1	Friendly
70.	23 October 2024	Thuwunna Stadium, Yangon, Myanmar	Hong Kong	4–1	4–1	Friendly
71.	17 February 2025	Dasharath Rangasala, Kathmandu, Nepal	Lebanon	1–0	3–1	2025 Vianet Championship
72.	26 February 2025	Dasharath Rangasala, Kathmandu, Nepal	Nepal	2–0	2–0	2025 Vianet Championship
73.	5 July 2025	Thuwunna Stadium, Yangon, Myanmar	Bahrain	4–0	6–0	2026 AFC Women's Asian Cup qualification
74.	10 August 2025	Việt Trì Stadium, Việt Trì, Vietnam	Timor-Leste	1–0	3–0	2025 ASEAN Women's Championship
75.	10 August 2025	Việt Trì Stadium, Việt Trì, Vietnam	Timor-Leste	2–0	3–0	2025 ASEAN Women's Championship
76.	10 August 2025	Việt Trì Stadium, Việt Trì, Vietnam	Timor-Leste	3–0	3–0	2025 ASEAN Women's Championship
77.	13 August 2025	Lạch Tray Stadium, Hải Phòng, Vietnam	Philippines	1–0	1–1	2025 ASEAN Women's Championship
78.	16 August 2025	Lạch Tray Stadium, Hải Phòng, Vietnam	Thailand	1–1	2–1	2025 ASEAN Women's Championship
79.	16 August 2025	Lạch Tray Stadium, Hải Phòng, Vietnam	Thailand	2–1	2–1	2025 ASEAN Women's Championship
80.	5 December 2025	IPE Chonburi Stadium, Chonburi, Thailand	Philippines	1–0	2–1	2025 Southeast Asian Games
81.	8 December 2025	IPE Chonburi Stadium, Chonburi, Thailand	Malaysia	3–0	3–0	2025 Southeast Asian Games

== Honours ==
Myanmar

- Women's Gold Cup: 2019
- AFF Women's Championship silver medal: 2015; bronze medal: 2016, 2019, 2022
- Southeast Asian Games silver medal: 2023; bronze medal: 2017, 2019

Myawady

- Myanmar Women League: 2016-17, 2017–18; runner-up: 2018–19

Gokulam Kerala

- Indian Women's League: 2021–22
- AFC Women's Club Championship third place: 2021

Lords FA

- Kerala Women's League: 2022–23

Odisha

- Indian Women's League: 2023–24

Thitsar Arman

- Myanmar Women League: runner-up: 2022

Individual

- Kerala Women's League Top Scorer: 2022–23 (56)goals
- Kerala Women's League Assist King: 2022–23 (31)assists
- All Time Top Scorer: Myanmar Women League
