= Kerala Blasters FC (women) =

Indian women's association football club

Kerala Blasters Women
- Full name: Kerala Blasters Football Club Women
- Nicknames: Manjappada (Yellow Army); The Tuskers
- Short name: KBWFC, KER
- Founded: 25 July 2022; 4 years ago
- Dissolved: 6 June 2023; 3 years ago (team operations temporarily paused)
- Ground: Jawaharlal Nehru Stadium (official); Maharaja's College Stadium (secondary)
- Capacity: 80,000; 15,000
- Owners: Magnum Sports Private Limited
- League: Kerala Women's League
- Website: https://keralablastersfc.in/
Home colours	Away colours

Kerala Blasters Football Club Women, commonly referred to as The Blasters, was an Indian women's football club based in Kochi, Kerala, that competed in the Kerala Women's League, the second-tier league of women's football in India. Founded in July 2022, the club was affiliated with their men's team Kerala Blasters FC in the Indian Super League. In June 2023, the Blasters management announced the temporary pause of the Women's team due to financial problems, after the All India Football Federation imposed financial sanction on the club.

== History ==
=== Formation ===
On 1 June 2022, the Kerala Blasters announced the appointment of Rajah Rizwan as the director of the club's academy and the newly planned women's team. Later on 25 July, Kerala Blasters officially launched their women's team and announced their participation in the 2022–23 Kerala Women's League season. Shereef Khan was appointed as the first ever head coach of the team on a long-term contract. They made their first ever signings in their history on 27 July when then signed the goalkeepers Tanu and Nisari to their squad. The next day the Blasters announced the signing of the five of the defenders Poli Koley, Sabnam Rai, Krishnapriya, Gadha TG, and Aneeta Manoj to their squad. Shortly after on the same day, they announced the signing of the Indian international Apurna Narzary. On 29 July, they announced the signings of Anjitha M, Poornima G, Lubina B, Arathi VV and Ashwathi P for the midfield positions, and the signing of the under-20 player Sunita Munda for the forward role. They signed Malavika as one of their strikers for the season on 31 July. In the early August, the Blasters announced their technical staff under Shereef Khan. They continued their signing spree for the upcoming season as they announced the signings of Elakkiya, Nilima, Abhirami and Pinky Kashyap for the defensive positions, Muskan Subba, Shalumole and Reet Kashyap for the midfield roles and Laxi Tamang and Kiran Pisda for the forward positions respectively. Later the same day, the Blasters announced the signing of the defender Aryasree. Then on 9 August, they further announced the signings of midfielders Sivisha and Nidhiya. On the same day they announced the signing of the Indian international and the 2021–22 Indian Women's League Emerging Player of the Season, Naorem Priyangka Devi. In early August, they announced their squad for their first ever season in the KWL, and announced Priyangka and Malavika as their captains of the season.

=== Inaugural season ===
Kerala Blasters played their first ever match on 10 August 2022 against Emirates Soccer Club at the Maharajas Ground and won the match 10–0 after Apurna Narzary completed a hat-trick with Kiran and Ashwathi completing their respective braces. They won the next match 10–0 against SB FA Poovar on 12 August in which Sivisha completed her hat-trick and Gadha and Nidhiya completed their respective braces. The Blasters played their next match on 16 August against Lords FA Kochi which ended in a 4–4 draw. On 2 September, the Blasters defeated Kadathanad Raja FA by 13–1. Laxmi scored four goals and Malavika completed her hat-trick by coming in as a substitute. On 11 September, they won 9–0 against Kerala United FC. On 18 September, they played against Basco FC and won 3–2 at full-time and retain their first place in the league table. The Blasters won their match against Luca SC on 2 October, which they won 4–0 after Apurna, who came back from an injury completed her brace. On 13 October, in their final league game, the Blasters suffered their first ever defeat in their history against Gokulam Kerala FC, where they lost 2–6. At the end of regular season, both Kerala Blasters and Lords FA finished with 22 points each having won seven, drawn one and lost one. However the Blasters were placed third in the league table behind Lords FA by virtue of goal difference and failed to advance to the final.

=== Temporary pause of operations ===
On 6 June 2023, Kerala Blasters announced a temporary pause of the women's team, owing to the financial sanctions levied on the club due to the walkout staged by their men's team in the 2023 Indian Super League playoffs in protest of continuous poor refereeing decisions.

== Notable players ==
For all former or notable Kerala Blasters FC (women) players with a Wikipedia article, see: Kerala Blasters FC (women) players.

== Personnel ==
=== Last technical staff ===
As of 3 August 2022

Role	Name	Refs.
Director	(India) Rajah Rizwan	
Head coach	(India) Shereef Khan AV	
Assistant Coach	(India) Aswini	
Assistant Team Manager	(India) Nisha	
Goalkeeping Coach	(India) Saji Joy	
Physiotherapist	(India) Priyanka	

Last updated: 25 July 2022
