= Sumitra Marandi =

Indian footballer

Personal information
- Date of birth: 25 October 1996 (age 30)
- Place of birth: Lathpahari, Jharkhand, India
- Position: Defender

Team information
- Current team: Kickstart
- Number: 3

Senior career*
Years	Team	Apps	(Gls)
- West Bengal
- Chandney Sporting Club
- Jharkhand
- Sethu
- SSB
- Gokulam Kerala

International career^{‡}
2014	India	3	(0)
- * Club domestic league appearances and goals ‡ National team caps and goals as of 21 November 2014

Sumitra Marandi (born 25 October 1996) is an Indian footballer who plays as a defender for the Indian Women's League club Kickstart. She has been a member of the India women's national team.

== Club career ==
Playing for West Bengal, Sumitra scored a goal during the semifinal match of the 2017–18 Rajmata Jijabai Trophy against eventual champions Tamil Nadu.

== International career ==
Sumitra capped for India at senior level during the 2014 SAFF Women's Championship.

== Honours ==
India

- SAFF Women's Championship: 2014
