= 2025–26 Kerala Women's League =

Season of Kerala premier League

- Season: 2025–26
- Dates: 27 February – 2 April 2026 (Regular Season); 4 April – 14 April 2026 (Super Four)
- Champions: Gokulam Kerala (4th title)
- Promoted: Lords FA
- Matches: 34
- Goals: 139 (4.09 per match)
- Top goalscorer: Neha Saji (7 Goals) (Lords FA)
- Biggest win: Lords FA 14–0 Inter Kerala FC (3 March 2026)
- Highest scoring: Lords FA 14–0 Inter Kerala FC (3 March 2026)
- Longest winning run: Gokulam Kerala (10 matches)
- Longest unbeaten run: Gokulam Kerala (10 matches)
- Longest winless run: Inter Kerala FC (7 matches)
- Longest losing run: Inter Kerala FC (7 matches)

The 2025–26 Kerala Women's League was the seventh season of the Kerala Women's League, the top division of the women's football league in the Indian state of Kerala. The season featured 8 teams with, Thrissur is the venue. The season will start on 27 February 2026.Gokulam Kerala are the defending champions.

== Teams ==
Six teams will contest the 2025–26 Kerala Women's League season. Apart from last season Alagappa FC, Devagiri College are not participating this season. PFC Kerala, Inter Kerala FC and Dreams FC Kochi are confirmed their participation.

=== Teams & locations ===
No.	Team	Location
1	City Club Chalakkudy	Chalakkudy
2	Dreams FC	Kochi
3	Gokulam Kerala	Kozhikode
4	Inter Kerala FC	Kothamangalam
5	Kerala United	Thrissur
6	Lords FA	Kochi
7	PFC Kerala	Parappur
8	Talents FA	Palakkad

=== Personnel and sponsorship ===
No.	Team	Coach	Captain	Sponsor	Remarks
1	City Club Chalakkudy		(India) Aswani MR	Trasitions LPS	
2	Dreams FC		(India) Keerthi Suresh		
3	Gokulam Kerala	(India) Priyanka	(India) Baby Lalchandami	CSB Bank	
4	Inter Kerala FC		(India) Greeshma S		
5	Kerala United	(India) Rajeev Raj	(India) Anjana MG		
6	Lords FA	(India) CV Seena	(India) Jishila Shibu		
7	PFC Kerala		(India) Biya Biju	Kalyan Silks	
8	Talents FA		(India) Anjana K	Kites	

== Venue ==
No.	Location	Stadium
1	Thrissur	Thrissur Municipal Corporation Stadium

== League table ==
Pos	Team	Pld	W	D	L	GF	GA	GD	Pts	Qualification
1	Gokulam Kerala (Note: Gokulam Kerala not eligible for promotion to Indian Women's League 2 as they are reserve team of Gokulam Kerala.)	7	7	0	0	31	1	+30	21	Super Four
2	Lords FA	7	4	1	2	24	7	+17	13	Super Four
3	City Club Chalakkudy	7	4	1	2	14	8	+6	13	Super Four
4	Dreams FC	7	4	1	2	10	8	+2	13	Super Four
5	PFC Kerala	7	3	1	3	19	13	+6	10	
6	Kerala United	7	2	0	5	14	7	+7	6	
7	Talents FA	7	2	0	5	11	20	−9	6	
8	Inter Kerala FC	7	0	0	7	1	60	−59	0	Relegated; KWL - 2nd Division

Updated to match(es) played on 02 April 2026. Source: The Away End

== Results ==
Home \ Away	CCC	DFC	GKFC	IKFC	KUFC	LFA	PFC	TFA
City Club Chalakkudy		0–1					3–2	3–1
Dreams FC			0–4			0–3	0–0	2–0
Gokulam Kerala FC	2–0			8–0	1–0	2–0		
Inter Kerala FC	0–5	0–5			0–11			
Kerala United FC	0–1	1–2						2–0
Lords FA	2–2			14–0	1–0			
PFC Kerala			1–6	10–0	2–0	3–1		
Talents FA			0–8	7–1		0–3	3–1	

Updated to match(es) played on 02 April 2026. Source: The Away End
Legend: Blue = home team win; Yellow = draw; Red = away team win.

== Super Four ==
=== League Table ===
Pos	Team	Pld	W	D	L	GF	GA	GD	Pts	
1	Gokulam Kerala (Note: Gokulam Kerala not eligible for promotion to Indian Women's League 2 as they are reserve team of Gokulam Kerala.)	3	3	0	0	8	0	+8	9	Champions
2	Lords FA	3	2	0	1	4	7	−3	6	Promotion to 2026–27 Indian Women's League 2
3	Dreams FC	3	1	0	2	2	4	−2	3	
4	City Club Chalakkudy	3	0	0	3	1	4	−3	0	

Updated to match(es) played on 14 April 2026. Source: The Away End

=== Results ===
Home \ Away	GKFC	LFA	CCC	DFC
GKFC		5–0		2–0
LFA			2–1	
CCC	0–1			0–1
DFC		1–2		

Updated to match(es) played on 14 April 2026. Source: The Away End
Legend: Blue = home team win; Yellow = draw; Red = away team win.

== Top scorers ==
(Last Update Date — 14 April 2026)
Rank	Player	Team	Goals
1	Neha Saji	Lords FA	7
2	Vaishnavi Dharmaraj	Gokulam Kerala	6
3	Neelambari P	Kerala United FC	6
4	Muskan Subba	Gokulam Kerala	6
5	Anjana Nakulan	PFC Kerala	6
6	Arya Anilkumar	Gokulam Kerala	4
7	Aparna K R	Talents FA	4
8	Aleena Tony	Lords FA	4
9	Vara Lakshmi S	PFC Kerala	4
10	Aleesha Hanan	Dreams FC	4
11	Nandana Krishnan	PFC Kerala	4
12	9 Player		3
13	13 Player		2
14	29 Player		1
15	Own Goals		2
Total Goals			139

== Season Awards ==
(Last Update Date — 14 April 2026)
Rank	Awards	Won
1	Champions	Gokulam Kerala
2	Runners-Up	Lords FA
3	Golden Boot	Neha Saji
4	Golden Glove	Melody Chanu Keisham
5	Golden Ball	Muskan Subba
