= Priya P. V. =

Indian football coach

Priya P.V.
Personal information
- Full name: Priya Parathi Valappil
- Date of birth: 27 May 1976 (age 50)
- Place of birth: Vengara, Kannur, Kerala, India

Senior career*
Years	Team	Apps	(Gls)
1997–2009	Kerala		

Managerial career
- 2013–2014: India Women U14
- 2017–2020: Gokulam Kerala
- 2022–2023: Gokulam Kerala
- 2022–2023: India Women (assistant)
- 2022–2024: India Women U17
- 2025–: India Women (assistant)
- * Club domestic league appearances and goals

Priya Parathi Valappil is an Indian football coach and former footballer, who is currently the head coach of the India women's U17 team and also is the assistant coach of the India women's football team. She is the first female coach from Kerala to hold the AFC A licence and India's first woman to hold AFC Pro License. In 2020, she led Gokulam Kerala (women) to their maiden Indian Women's League title, which is the top-tier league of women football in India.

== Early life and playing career ==
Priya P.V. was born in Vengara, Madayi, Kannur. She was introduced to football by her father at a very young age. She was selected for the Kerala team in 1997 and went on to play for them until 2009, after which she retired from playing.

== Coaching career ==
After getting a masters in physical education from Calicut University, she later took a diploma in coaching from the National Institute of Sport, Patiala. In 2007, she acquired the AFC-C license. Her first achievement as a coach came in 2012 as she led the under-14 India women team to win the AFC under-14 Championship. The team again won the title in 2013 under Priya's stewardship. Later, she became the first women from Kerala to get the AFC-A license in coaching. In 2020, she led Gokulam Kerala (women) to claim their first–ever Indian Women's League title.

== Honours ==
=== Manager ===
Gokulam Kerala

- Indian Women's League: 2019–20
- Kerala Women's League runner-up: 2022–23
