= 2024–25 Kerala Women's League =

Season of Kerala premier League

- Season: 2024–25
- Dates: 23 January 2025 – 01 March 2025
- Champions: Gokulam Kerala (3rd title)
- Promoted: Kerala United
- Matches: 30
- Goals: 91 (3.03 per match)
- Top goalscorer: Reshma P (Kerala United)

The 2024–25 Kerala Women's League was the sixth season of the Kerala Women's League, the top division of the women's football league in the Indian state of Kerala. The season featured 6 teams with, Kunnamkulam, Thrissur is the venue. The season began on 23 January 2025. Gokulam Kerala are the defending champions, won their second title with a 6-2 victory over Devagiri College.

== Teams ==
Six teams will contest the 2024–25 Kerala Women's League season. Apart from last season FC Kerala, Kadathanad Raja FA, SBFA Poovar are not participating this season. Alagappa FC and City Club Chalakkudy are confirmed their participation.

=== Teams & locations ===
No.	Team	Location
1	Alagappa FC	Vendore
2	City Club Chalakkudy	Chalakkudy
3	Devagiri College	Kozhikode
4	Gokulam Kerala	Kozhikode
5	Kerala United	Manjeri
6	Lords FA	Kochi

=== Personnel and sponsorship ===
No.	Team	Coach	Captain	Sponsor	Remarks
1	Alagappa FC				
2	City Club Chalakkudy				
3	Devagiri College			Gokulam Group	
4	Gokulam Kerala	(India) Nivetha Ramadoss	(India) Angel	CSB Bank	
5	Kerala United	(India) Suanlian Zou	(India) Sandra K	YELO	
6	Lords FA	(India) Ajith Kumar			

== Venue ==
No.	Location	Stadium
1	Thrissur	Govt Boys HSS Ground Kunnamkulam

== League table ==
Pos	Team	Pld	W	D	L	GF	GA	GD	Pts	Qualification
1	Gokulam Kerala (Note: Gokulam Kerala not eligible for promotion to Indian Women's League 2 as they are reserve team of Gokulam Kerala.)	10	8	1	1	29	5	+24	25	Champions
2	Kerala United	10	8	0	2	19	4	+15	24	Promotion to 2025–26 Indian Women's League 2
3	Alagappa FC	10	4	2	4	14	18	−4	14	
4	City Club Chalakkudy	10	3	2	5	15	17	−2	11	
5	Lords FA	10	2	4	4	12	19	−7	10	
6	Devagiri College	10	0	1	9	2	28	−26	1	Relegated

Updated to match(es) played on 1 March 2025. Source: The Away End

== Season statistics ==
=== Top scorers ===
As of 01 March 2025

Rank	Player	Team	Goals
1	(India) P Reshma	Kerala United	9
2	(India) Neelambari TK	Alagappa FC	7
3	(India) Harshika Manish Jain	Gokulam Kerala	6
4	(India) Mahalakshmi	Gokulam Kerala	5
4	(India) Souparnika	Lords FA	5
6	(India) Baby Lalchandami	Gokulam Kerala	4
6	(India) Aleena Tony	Kerala United	4
8	(India) Dharshini Devi	Gokulam Kerala	3
8	(India) Anjana Nakulan	Alagappa	3
8	(India) Priyanka Bhagat	City Club Chalakudy	3
8	(India) Jesi JS	City Club Chalakudy	3

== Awards ==
Award	Player	Team
Best Goalkeeper	Arathi V	Kerala United
Top Scorer	P Reshma	Kerala United
Player of the Tournament	Neelambari P	Alagappa FC
