= Payal Basude =

Indian female football player

Personal information
- Full name: Payal Basude
- Date of birth: 30 September 2003 (age 23)
- Place of birth: Maharashtra, India
- Position: Goalkeeper

Team information
- Current team: East Bengal

Senior career*
Years	Team	Apps	(Gls)
2019–2020	Future Star FC		
2020–2021	King Star SA		
2021–2022	PIFA Sports		
2022–2023	Odisha		
2023–2025	Gokulam Kerala	14	(0)
2025–	East Bengal		

International career^{‡}
2024–	India	2	(0)
- * Club domestic league appearances and goals ‡ National team caps and goals as of 3 June 2025

Payal Ramesh Basude (born 30 September 2003) is an Indian professional footballer from Maharashtra who plays as a goalkeeper for the Indian Women's League club East Bengal and the India national football team. She has also represented Maharashtra in the Rajmata Jijabai Trophy.

== Early life ==
Basude is from Maharashtra and learnt her basics at the King Star Sports Academy. She earlier played for PIFA Sports, Odisha FC, King Star Sports Academy and Future Star Football Club.

== Career ==
=== Domestic ===
She captained the Maharashtra team in the 27th Senior Women's national football championship 2022–2023 at Uttarakhand held from 27 March to 9 April 2023. Maharashtra played under coach Sanaya Anklesaria and were pooled in Group A with Mizoram, Pondicherry, Kerala, hosts Uttarakhand and Chandigarh.

In December 2024, she also played for Maharashtra in the 29th Senior Women's National Football Championship for Rajmata Jijabai Trophy 2024–25 at the Ramakrishna Mission Ashrama Ground at Narainpur, Chhattisgarh.

=== International career ===
In October 2024, Basude made her senior international debut for India at the 2024 SAFF Women's Championship by coming off the bench towards the end of the semi-finals against Nepal. India lost the match to Nepal 2–4, in the penalty shootout at the Dasharath Stadium in Kathmandu.

The Indian women's team head coach Crispin Chettri, named her among the 32 probables for the camp ahead of the Pink Ladies Cup to be played in Dubai from 20 to 26 February 2025. Korea Republic, Russia, Thailand, Uzbekistan, Jordan and India are taking part in the senior international friendlies.

== Career statistics ==
=== International ===
As of 3 June 2025

National team	Year	Caps	Goals
India	2024	1	0
India	2025	1	0
Total		2	0

== Honours ==
PIFA Sports

- WIFA Women's Football League: 2021–22

Odisha

- Indian Women's League: 2023–24

Gokulam Kerala

- Kerala Women's League: 2023–24
