= 2022–23 Kerala Women's League =

Football league season

- Season: 2022–23
- Dates: 10 August – 15 October 2022
- Country: India
- Teams: 10
- Champions: Lords FA (1st title)
- Best Player: Indumathi Kathiresan
- Top goalscorer: Win Theingi Tun (51 goals)
- Biggest home win: Lords FA 33–1 Kadathanad Raja FA (17 September)
- Biggest away win: Emirates SC 0–15 Lords FA (19 August); Emirates SC 0–15 Gokulam Kerala FC (women) (11 September)
- Highest scoring: Lords FA 33–1 Kadathanad Raja FA (17 September)

The 2022–23 Kerala Women's League season was the fourth season of the Kerala Women's League, the top division of the women's football league in the Indian state of Kerala. The season featured 10 teams with Kozhikode and Kochi as the venues. The season began on 10 August 2022.

Locations of the 2020–21 Kerala Premier League teams

== Teams & locations ==
| No. | Team | Location |
|---|---|---|
| 1 | BASCO Womens | Othukkungal, Malappuram |
| 2 | Don Bosco FA | Ernakulam |
| 3 | Emirates SC | Kattakada, Trivandrum |
| 4 | Gokulam Kerala FC | Kozhikode |
| 5 | Lords FA | Kochi, Ernakulam |
| 6 | Luca Soccer Club | Manjeri, Malappuram |
| 7 | Kadathanad Raja FA | Vadakara, Kozhikode |
| 8 | Kerala Blasters FC Women | Kochi, Ernakulam |
| 9 | Kerala United FC | Manjeri, Malappuram |
| 10 | SBFA Poovar | Poovar, Trivandrum |

== Personnel and sponsorship ==
| No. | Team | Coach | Captain | Sponsor | Remarks |
|---|---|---|---|---|---|
| 1 | BASCO Womens | | | | |
| 2 | Don Bosco FA | (India) Baby Josh | | | |
| 3 | Emirates SC | (India) Britto | (India) Adithya PV | | |
| 4 | Gokulam Kerala FC | (India) Priya P.V. | (India) Kashmina | Gokulam Group | |
| 5 | Lords FA | (India) Bentla Dcouth | | | |
| 6 | Luca Soccer Club | | | Abreco | |
| 7 | Kadathanad Raja FA | | | | |
| 8 | Kerala Blasters FC Women | (India) Shereef Khan A.V | (India) Priyangka (India) Malavika | Byju's | |
| 9 | Kerala United FC | | (India) Sandra K | Micro Health Laboratories | |
| 10 | SBFA Poovar | | | | |

== Venues ==
| No. | Location | Stadium |
|---|---|---|
| 1 | Kozhikode | EMS Stadium |
| 2 | Ernakulam | Maharaja's College Stadium |

== Official partners ==
| No. | Section | Partners |
|---|---|---|
| 1 | Sponsor | Ramco Cements |
| 2 | Equipment | Nivia |
| 3 | Medical | Medical Trust Hospital |
| 4 | Radio | RED FM |
| 5 | Broadcast | Sportscast India |
| 6 | Promo content | Reel Tribe |

== Standings ==
| Team | Pld | W | D | L | GF | GA | GD | Pts |
|---|---|---|---|---|---|---|---|---|
| Gokulam Kerala | 9 | 9 | 0 | 0 | 93 | 3 | +90 | 27 |
| Lords FA | 9 | 7 | 1 | 1 | 110 | 14 | +96 | 22 |
| Kerala Blasters | 9 | 7 | 1 | 1 | 60 | 13 | +47 | 22 |
| Basco Womens | 9 | 5 | 0 | 4 | 24 | 17 | +7 | 15 |
| Don Bosco FA | 9 | 4 | 1 | 4 | 23 | 28 | -5 | 13 |
| Kerala United | 9 | 4 | 0 | 5 | 22 | 27 | -5 | 12 |
| Luca | 9 | 3 | 1 | 5 | 8 | 34 | -26 | 10 |
| Emirates SC | 9 | 3 | 0 | 6 | 13 | 57 | -44 | 9 |
| Kadathanad Raja FA | 9 | 1 | 0 | 8 | 12 | 91 | -79 | 3 |
| SBFA Poovar | 9 | 0 | 0 | 9 | 3 | 84 | -81 | 0 |

● Promotion to Indian Women's League

== Final ==
15 October 2022

| Gokulam Kerala | 2–5 | Lords FA |
|---|---|---|
| Adjei 22'; Berth 85' | Report | Win Theingi Tun 27', 40', 53', 88'; Indumathi 90+' |

EMS Stadium, Kozhikode

== Season statistics ==
=== Goal scorers ===
As of 18 September 2022

Note: Only top 10 players with most goals scored have been listed below. List of Goal Scorers in Kerala Women's League 2022-23.

| Rank | Player | Club | Goals |
|---|---|---|---|
| 1 | (Myanmar) Win Theingi Tun | Lords FA | 51 |
| 2 | (India) Indumathi Karthiresan | Lords FA | 33 |
| 3 | (Ghana) Vivian Adjei | Gokulam Kerala | 15 |
| 4 | (India) Malavika P | Kerala Blasters | 10 |
| 5 | (India) P. Reshma | Don Bosco FA | 9 |
| 5 | (Nepal) Deepa Neupane | Don Bosco FA | 9 |
| 7 | (India) Baby Lalchhandami | Kerala United | 8 |
| 7 | (India) Soniya Jose | Gokulam Kerala | 8 |
| 9 | (India) Sauparnika T. | Basco FC | 7 |
| 9 | (India) Harmilan Kaur | Gokulam Kerala | 7 |
| 9 | (India) Nidhiiya Sreedharan | Kerala Blasters | 7 |

=== Top assists ===
As of 18 September 2022

Note: Only top 10 players with most goals scored have been listed below. List of Goal Scorers in Kerala Women's League 2022-23.

| Rank | Player | Club | Assists |
|---|---|---|---|
| 1 | (Myanmar) Win Theingi Tun | Lords FA | 31+ |
| 2 | (India) Indumathi Karthiresan | Lords FA | 15+ |
| 3 | (Ghana) Vivian Adjei | Gokulam Kerala | 7+ |
| 4 | (India) Malavika P | Kerala Blasters | 5+ |

=== Clean sheets ===
As of 14 August 2022

Note: Only top 5 goalkeepers with most clean sheets have been listed below.

| Rank | Player | Club | Clean sheets |
|---|---|---|---|
| 1 | (India) Nisari K | Kerala Blasters | 2 |
| 2 | (India) Arathi | Kerala United | 1 |
| 2 | (India) Sowmiya Narayansamy | Gokulam Kerala | 1 |

== Awards ==
| Award | Player | Team |
|---|---|---|
| Best Goalkeeper | Varsha EM | Luca SC |
| Best Defender | Femina Raj V | Gokulam Kerala |
| Top Scorer | Win Theingi Tun | Lord’s FA |
| Player of the Tournament | Indumathi Kathiresan | Lord’s FA |
