= 2021–22 Kerala Women's League =

Season of Kerala premier League

- Season: 2021–22
- Country: India
- Teams: 6
- Champions: Gokulam Kerala (1st title)
- Matches: 30
- Goals: 198 (6.6 per match)

The 2021–22 Kerala Women's League season was the third season of the Kerala Women's League. The season featured 6 teams and all the matches were played at single venue. The season was started in the mid of November 2021. The Kerala Football Association conducted the women's league after a gap 7 years.

== Logo ==
On 29 October 2021, the official logo for the Scoreline Kerala Women’s League (KWL) was launched by MM Jacob, a former Indian international as well as former Kerala coach and player. The launch event was conducted after the final of the 23rd Senior Women’s Inter-District Championship at the Maharaja’s College Stadium Ground in Kochi.

The logo of the Kerala Women’s League 2021-22 shows a woman playing football. “By playing the game she earns her wings to achieve her aspirations and dreams. The logo is inspired by the statement: Women should be in-charge and should also take charge of their respective destiny,” Kerala Football Association (KFA)’s official statement read.

— Harigovind Thoyakkat, Khel Now
Locations of the 2020–21 Kerala Premier League teams

== Teams ==
No.	Team	Location	Home	Sponsor
1	Gokulam Kerala FC	Kozhikode	EMS Stadium	Gokulam Group
2	Kerala United FC	Manjeri	Payyanad Stadium	Micro Health Laboratories
3	Don Bosco FA	Ernakulam		
4	Kadathanad Raja FA	Purameri, Vadakara		
5	Travancore Royals FC	Thiruvananthapuram	University Stadium (Thiruvananthapuram)	Vismayasmax Animation
6	Luca Soccer Club	Manjeri	Payyanad Stadium	Abreco

== Standings ==
Team	Pld	W	D	L	GF	GA	GD	Pts
Gokulam Kerala	10	10	0	0	99	0	+99	30
Don Bosco FA	10	6	1	3	28	14	+14	19
Travancore Royals	10	6	0	4	43	30	+13	18
Kerala United	10	4	2	4	16	26	-10	14
Kadathanad Raja FA	10	2	1	7	10	56	-46	7
Luca	10	0	0	10	2	72	-70	0

● Promoted to Indian Women's League

== Awards ==
Award	Player	Team
Best Goalkeeper	(India) Keerthana	Don Bosco FA
Top Scorer	(Ghana) Elshaddai Acheampong	Gokulam Kerala
Player of the Tournament	(India) Jyothi	Gokulam Kerala
