= 2023–24 Kerala Women's League =

Season of Kerala premier League

- Season: 2023–24
- Dates: 9 December 2023 – 5 February 2024
- Champions: Gokulam Kerala (2nd title)
- Promoted: Kerala United
- Matches played: 41
- Goals scored: 174 (4.24 per match)
- Best Player: Priyadarshini
- Top goalscorer: Priyadarshini (Gokulam Kerala) (24 Goals)
- Biggest win: Gokulam Kerala 11-1 Devagiri College (03 January 2024); Gokulam Kerala 10–0 Kadathanad Raja (14 January 2024)
- Highest scoring: Gokulam Kerala 11-1 Devagiri College (03 January 2024)

The 2023–24 Kerala Women's League is the fifth season of the Kerala Women's League, the top division of the women's football league in the Indian state of Kerala. The season featured 7 teams with Thrissur will be the venue. The season began on 9 December 2023. Gokulam Kerala won their second title with a 6-2 victory over Devagiri College.

== Teams ==
Seven teams will contest the 2023–24 Kerala Women's League season. Apart from last season BASCO Womens, Don Bosco FA, Emirates SC, Kerala Blasters FC Women are not participating this season. Devagiri College and FC Kerala are confirmed their participation.

=== Teams & locations ===
No.	Team	Location
1	Devagiri College	Kozhikode
2	FC Kerala	Thrissur
3	Gokulam Kerala FC	Kozhikode
4	Kadathanad Raja FA	Vadakara
5	Kerala United FC	Manjeri
6	Lords FA	Kochi
7	SBFA Poovar	Poovar

=== Personnel and sponsorship ===
No.	Team	Coach	Captain	Sponsor	Remarks
1	Devagiri College	(India)		Gokulam Group	
2	FC Kerala	(India)		Yogakshemam Loans	
3	Gokulam Kerala FC	(India) Nivetha Ramadoss	(India) Manju Baby	CSB Bank	
4	Kadathanad Raja FA				
5	Kerala United FC	(India) Suanlian Zou	(India) Sandra K	YELO	
6	Lords FA	(India) Ajith Kumar			
7	SBFA Poovar			Sakaria Group	

== Venues ==
No.	Location	Stadium
1	Thrissur	Thrissur Corporation Stadium

== Official partners ==
No.	Section	Partners
1	Sponsor	Ramco Cements
2	Equipment	Nivia
3	Medical	Medical Trust Hospital
4	Radio	RED FM
5	Broadcast	Sportscast India
6	Promo content	Reel Tribe

== Regular season ==
=== League table ===
Pos	Team	Pld	W	D	L	GF	GA	GD	Pts	Qualification
1	Gokulam Kerala (Note: Gokulam Kerala could not promote to Indian Women's League 2 as they are Gokulam Kerala FC reserve team, so the third positioned team qualified for the 2023–24 Indian Women's League 2.)	12	11	0	1	71	9	+62	33	Champions
2	Lords FA (Note: Lords FA could not promote to Indian Women's League 2 as they are Lords FA reserve team, so the third positioned team qualified for the 2023–24 Indian Women's League 2.)	12	8	2	2	30	12	+18	26 (Note: Lords are ahead of Kerala United on head-to-head points: Lords 2–0 Kerala United, Kerala United 1–1 Lords)	
3	Kerala United	12	8	2	2	32	12	+20	26	Promotion to 2023–24 Indian Women's League 2
4	SBFA Poovar	12	2	4	6	14	31	−17	10	
5	FC Kerala	12	3	1	8	6	34	−28	10	
6	Kadathanad Raja FA	12	2	2	8	9	44	−35	8	
7	Devagiri College	12	2	1	9	17	37	−20	7	

Updated to match(es) played on 05 February 2024. Source: The Away End

=== Fixtures and results ===
Home \ Away	DC	FCK	GKFC	KRFA	KUFC	LFA	SBFA
Devagiri College		0–1	2–6	0–1	1–2	1–3	2–2
FC Kerala	2–1		0–4	1–1	0–5	0–4	0–3
Gokulam Kerala FC	11–1	9–0		10–0	2–4	2–0	5–0
Kadathanad Raja FA	0–1	1–0	1–8		0–3	0–3	2–2
Kerala United FC	3–1	4–0	0–5	8–0		1–1	1–0
Lords FA	5–2	1–0	0–5	5–1	1–0		7–0
SBFA Poovar	1–5	1–2	1–4	3–2	1–1	0–0	

Updated to match(es) played on 05 February 2023. Source: The Away End
Legend: Blue = home team win; Yellow = draw; Red = away team win.

== Season statistics ==
=== Top scorers ===
As of 05 February 2023

Rank	Player	Club	Goals
1	(India) Priyadarshini	Gokulam Kerala	24
2	(India) Pristy CA	Kerala United	15
3	(India) Baby Lalchhandami	Gokulam Kerala	10
3	(India) Harshika Manish Jain	Devagiri College	10
3	(India) Anitha	SBFA Poovar	10
6	(India) Kusum	Lords FA	9
7	(India) Muskan Subba	Gokulam Kerala	7
8	(India) Manasa K	Gokulam Kerala	6
8	(India) Arathi	Gokulam Kerala	6
10	(India) Aswani	Lords FA	5
10	(India) Abhirami	Kerala United	5

=== Hat-tricks ===
Player	For	Against	Result	Date	Ref
Pristy CA	Kerala United	FC Kerala	5-0	10 December 2023	
Harshika Manish Jain	Devagiri College	SBFA Poovar	5-1	14 December 2023	
Priyadarshini	Gokulam Kerala	Kadathanad Raja	8-1	18 December 2023	
Priyadarshini	Gokulam Kerala	FC Kerala	9-0	24 December 2023	
Priyadarshini	Gokulam Kerala	Kerala United	5-0	10 January 2024	
Priyadarshini^{7}	Gokulam Kerala	Kadathanad Raja	10-0	14 January 2024	
Kusum	Lords FA	SBFA Poovar	7-0	15 January 2024	
Abirami	Lords FA	SBFA Poovar	7-0	15 January 2024	
Kusum	Lords FA	Kadathanad Raja	5-1	20 January 2024	
Manasa K^{4}	Gokulam Kerala	Devagiri College	6-2	25 January 2024	
Anitha	SBFA Poovar	FC Kerala	3-0	2 February 2024	
Pristy CA	Kerala United	Kadathanad Raja	8-0	5 February 2024	

Notes

a. ^{7} Player scored 7 goals, b. ^{4} Player scored 4 goals,

== Awards ==
Award	Player	Team
Best Goalkeeper	Nisari K	Lord’s FA
Top Scorer	Priyadarshini	Gokulam Kerala
Player of the Tournament	Priyadarshini	Gokulam Kerala
