= 2017–18 Senior Women's National Football Championship =

2017–18 Women's National Football Championship
Tournament details
- Country: India
- Dates: 28 January—14 February 2018
- Teams: 29

Final positions
- Champions: Tamil Nadu (1st title)
- Runners-up: Manipur

Tournament statistics
- Matches played: 36
- Goals scored: 294 (8.17 per match)

Awards
- Best player: Indumathi Kathiresan (Tamil Nadu)

The 2017–18 Senior Women's National Football Championship is the 23rd edition of the Senior Women's National Football Championship, the premier competition in India for women's teams representing regional and state football associations.

Manipur were the defending champions, having defeated Railways in the final during the 2016–17 edition of the tournament. The tournament was hosted in Odisha and ran from 28 January to 14 February 2018 at the Barabati Stadium.

Tamil Nadu won the championship, beating Manipur 2–1 in the final. Their story inspired the 2019 film Bigil. Indumathi Kathiresan was both Player of the Final and Player of the Tournament.

== Format ==
The 29 teams in the tournament are split into 8 groups of 2–4 teams each. On 9 February and 10 February, there will be four quarter-final matches and on 12 February there will be two semi-final matches. The Final itself will occur on 14 February.

=== Round dates ===
The schedule will be follows.

| Round | Match dates |
|---|---|
| Group stage | 28 January – 7 February 2018 |
| Quarter-finals | 9 February – 10 February 2018 |
| Semi-finals | 12 February 2018 |
| Final | 14 February 2018 |

== Group stage ==
=== Group A ===
| Pos | Team | Pld | W | D | L | GF | GA | GD | Pts | Qualification |
|---|---|---|---|---|---|---|---|---|---|---|
| 1 | Delhi | 3 | 3 | 0 | 0 | 13 | 0 | +13 | 9 | Advance to Quarter-finals |
| 2 | Assam | 3 | 1 | 1 | 1 | 2 | 3 | −1 | 4 | |
| 3 | Chhattisgarh | 3 | 1 | 0 | 2 | 2 | 8 | −6 | 3 | |
| 4 | Telangana | 3 | 0 | 1 | 2 | 1 | 7 | −6 | 1 | |

Source: All India Football Federation
Rules for classification: 1) points; 2) goal difference; 3) goals scored; 4) head-to-head result.

| 28 January 2018 | Delhi | 7–0 | Chhattisgarh | Cuttack |
| | | | | Stadium: Barabati Stadium |

| 30 January 2018 | Chhattisgarh | 2–0 | Telangana | Cuttack |
| | | | | Stadium: Barabati Stadium |

| 1 February 2018 | Assam | 0–2 | Delhi | Cuttack |
| | | | | Stadium: Barabati Stadium |

| 3 February 2018 | Delhi | 4–0 | Telangana | Cuttack |
| | | | | Stadium: Barabati Stadium |

| 5 February 2018 | Assam | 1–0 | Chhattisgarh | Cuttack |
| | | | | Stadium: Barabati Stadium |

| 7 February 2018 | Telangana | 1–1 | Assam | Cuttack |
| | | | | Stadium: Barabati Stadium |

=== Group B ===
| Pos | Team | Pld | W | D | L | GF | GA | GD | Pts | Qualification |
|---|---|---|---|---|---|---|---|---|---|---|
| 1 | Manipur | 3 | 3 | 0 | 0 | 32 | 1 | +31 | 9 | Advance to Quarter-finals |
| 2 | Maharashtra | 3 | 2 | 0 | 1 | 19 | 7 | +12 | 6 | |
| 3 | Karnataka | 3 | 1 | 0 | 2 | 4 | 11 | −7 | 3 | |
| 4 | Rajasthan | 3 | 0 | 0 | 3 | 0 | 36 | −36 | 0 | |

Source: All India Football Federation
Rules for classification: 1) points; 2) goal difference; 3) goals scored; 4) head-to-head result.

| 28 January 2018 | Manipur | 18–0 | Rajasthan | Cuttack |
| | | | | Stadium: Barabati Stadium |

| 30 January 2018 | Rajasthan | 0–3 | Karnataka | Cuttack |
| | | | | Stadium: Barabati Stadium |

| 1 February 2018 | Maharashtra | 1–6 | Manipur | Cuttack |
| | | | | Stadium: Barabati Stadium |

| 3 February 2018 | Manipur | 8–0 | Karnataka | Cuttack |
| | | | | Stadium: Barabati Stadium |

| 5 February 2018 | Maharashtra | 15–0 | Rajasthan | Cuttack |
| | | | | Stadium: Barabati Stadium |

| 7 February 2018 | Karnataka | 1–3 | Maharashtra | Cuttack |
| | | | | Stadium: Barabati Stadium |

=== Group C ===
| Pos | Team | Pld | W | D | L | GF | GA | GD | Pts | Qualification |
|---|---|---|---|---|---|---|---|---|---|---|
| 1 | Tamil Nadu | 3 | 2 | 1 | 0 | 17 | 2 | +15 | 7 | Advance to Quarter-finals |
| 2 | Goa | 3 | 2 | 1 | 0 | 6 | 2 | +4 | 7 | |
| 3 | Sikkim | 3 | 1 | 0 | 2 | 4 | 8 | −4 | 3 | |
| 4 | Uttarakhand | 3 | 0 | 0 | 3 | 2 | 17 | −15 | 0 | |

Source: All India Football Federation
Rules for classification: 1) points; 2) goal difference; 3) goals scored; 4) head-to-head result.

| 28 January 2018 | Tamil Nadu | 5–0 | Sikkim | Cuttack |
| | | | | Stadium: Barabati Stadium |

| 30 January 2018 | Sikkim | 3–1 | Uttarakhand | Cuttack |
| | | | | Stadium: Barabati Stadium |

| 1 February 2018 | Goa | 1–1 | Tamil Nadu | Cuttack |
| | | | | Stadium: Barabati Stadium |

| 3 February 2018 | Tamil Nadu | 11–1 | Uttarakhand | Cuttack |
| | | | | Stadium: Barabati Stadium |

| 5 February 2018 | Goa | 2–1 | Sikkim | Cuttack |
| | | | | Stadium: Barabati Stadium |

| 7 February 2018 | Uttarakhand | 0–3 | Goa | Cuttack |
| | | | | Stadium: Barabati Stadium |

=== Group D ===
| Pos | Team | Pld | W | D | L | GF | GA | GD | Pts | Qualification |
|---|---|---|---|---|---|---|---|---|---|---|
| 1 | Punjab | 3 | 3 | 0 | 0 | 12 | 0 | +12 | 9 | Advance to Quarter-finals |
| 2 | Uttar Pradesh | 3 | 2 | 0 | 1 | 2 | 7 | −5 | 6 | |
| 3 | Jharkhand | 3 | 1 | 0 | 2 | 5 | 3 | +2 | 3 | |
| 4 | Arunachal Pradesh | 3 | 0 | 0 | 3 | 1 | 10 | −9 | 0 | |

Source: All India Football Federation
Rules for classification: 1) points; 2) goal difference; 3) goals scored; 4) head-to-head result.

| 28 January 2018 | Jharkhand | 0–1 | Punjab | Cuttack |
| | | | | Stadium: Barabati Stadium |

| 30 January 2018 | Punjab | 7–0 | Uttar Pradesh | Cuttack |
| | | | | Stadium: Barabati Stadium |

| 1 February 2018 | Arunachal Pradesh | 1–5 | Jharkhand | Cuttack |
| | | | | Stadium: Barabati Stadium |

| 3 February 2018 | Jharkhand | 0–1 | Uttar Pradesh | Cuttack |
| | | | | Stadium: Barabati Stadium |

| 5 February 2018 | Arunachal Pradesh | 0–4 | Punjab | Cuttack |
| | | | | Stadium: Barabati Stadium |

| 7 February 2018 | Uttar Pradesh | 1–0 | Arunachal Pradesh | Cuttack |
| | | | | Stadium: Barabati Stadium |

=== Group E ===
| Pos | Team | Pld | W | D | L | GF | GA | GD | Pts | Qualification |
|---|---|---|---|---|---|---|---|---|---|---|
| 1 | Railways | 3 | 3 | 0 | 0 | 28 | 1 | +27 | 9 | Advance to Quarter-finals |
| 2 | Kerala | 3 | 2 | 0 | 1 | 8 | 13 | −5 | 6 | |
| 3 | Bihar | 3 | 1 | 0 | 2 | 7 | 12 | −5 | 3 | |
| 4 | Chandigarh | 3 | 0 | 0 | 3 | 2 | 19 | −17 | 0 | |

Source: All India Football Federation
Rules for classification: 1) points; 2) goal difference; 3) goals scored; 4) head-to-head result.

| 29 January 2018 | Railways | 8–0 | Bihar | Cuttack |
| | | | | Stadium: Barabati Stadium |

| 31 January 2018 | Kerala | 3–0 | Bihar | Cuttack |
| | | | | Stadium: Barabati Stadium |

| 2 February 2018 | Chandigarh | 1–7 | Railways | Cuttack |
| | | | | Stadium: Barabati Stadium |

| 4 February 2018 | Bihar | 7–1 | Chandigarh | Cuttack |
| | | | | Stadium: Barabati Stadium |

| 4 February 2018 | Railways | 13–0 | Kerala | Cuttack |
| | | | | Stadium: Barabati Stadium |

| 6 February 2018 | Chandigarh | 0–5 | Kerala | Cuttack |
| | | | | Stadium: Barabati Stadium |

=== Group F ===
| Pos | Team | Pld | W | D | L | GF | GA | GD | Pts | Qualification |
|---|---|---|---|---|---|---|---|---|---|---|
| 1 | Haryana | 3 | 2 | 1 | 0 | 36 | 2 | +34 | 7 | Advance to Quarter-finals |
| 2 | Puducherry | 3 | 2 | 1 | 0 | 31 | 5 | +26 | 7 | |
| 3 | Madhya Pradesh | 3 | 1 | 0 | 2 | 8 | 24 | −16 | 3 | |
| 4 | Jammu and Kashmir | 3 | 0 | 0 | 3 | 0 | 44 | −44 | 0 | |

Source: All India Football Federation
Rules for classification: 1) points; 2) goal difference; 3) goals scored; 4) head-to-head result.

| 29 January 2018 | Haryana | 10–0 | Madhya Pradesh | Cuttack |
| | | | | Stadium: Barabati Stadium |

| 31 January 2018 | Puducherry | 14–3 | Madhya Pradesh | Cuttack |
| | | | | Stadium: Barabati Stadium |

| 2 February 2018 | Jammu and Kashmir | 0–15 | Puducherry | Cuttack |
| | | | | Stadium: Barabati Stadium |

| 4 February 2018 | Puducherry | 2–2 | Haryana | Cuttack |
| | | | | Stadium: Barabati Stadium |

| 4 February 2018 | Madhya Pradesh | 5–0 | Jammu and Kashmir | Cuttack |
| | | | | Stadium: Barabati Stadium |

| 6 February 2018 | Jammu and Kashmir | 0–24 | Haryana | Cuttack |
| | | | | Stadium: Barabati Stadium |

=== Group G ===
| Pos | Team | Pld | W | D | L | GF | GA | GD | Pts | Qualification |
|---|---|---|---|---|---|---|---|---|---|---|
| 1 | Odisha | 2 | 2 | 0 | 0 | 15 | 0 | +15 | 6 | Advance to Quarter-finals |
| 2 | Gujarat | 2 | 0 | 0 | 2 | 0 | 15 | −15 | 0 | |

Source: All India Football Federation
Rules for classification: 1) points; 2) goal difference; 3) goals scored; 4) head-to-head result.

| 31 January 2018 | Gujarat | 0–10 | Odisha | Cuttack |
| | | | | Stadium: Barabati Stadium |

| 2 January 2018 | Odisha | 5–0 | Gujarat | Cuttack |
| | | | | Stadium: Barabati Stadium |

=== Group H ===
| Pos | Team | Pld | W | D | L | GF | GA | GD | Pts | Qualification |
|---|---|---|---|---|---|---|---|---|---|---|
| 1 | West Bengal | 2 | 2 | 0 | 0 | 13 | 0 | +13 | 6 | Advance to Quarter-finals |
| 2 | Mizoram | 2 | 1 | 0 | 1 | 3 | 12 | −9 | 3 | |
| 3 | Himachal Pradesh | 2 | 0 | 0 | 2 | 2 | 6 | −4 | 0 | |

Source: All India Football Federation
Rules for classification: 1) points; 2) goal difference; 3) goals scored; 4) head-to-head result.

| 29 January 2018 | West Bengal | 3–0 | Himachal Pradesh | Cuttack |
| | | | | Stadium: Barabati Stadium |

| 31 January 2018 | Mizoram | 0–10 | West Bengal | Cuttack |
| | | | | Stadium: Barabati Stadium |

| 2 February 2018 | Himachal Pradesh | 2–3 | Mizoram | Cuttack |
| | | | | Stadium: Barabati Stadium |

== Bracket ==
Quarter-finals
Tamil Nadu | 2
Odisha | 0
Delhi | 1
Railways | 2
Punjab | 0
West Bengal | 2
Manipur | 3
Haryana | 0

Semi-finals
Tamil Nadu | 4
West Bengal | 1
Railways | 1
Manipur | 2

Final
Tamil Nadu | 2
Manipur | 1

== Quarter-finals ==
*Quarter-finals were played on 9 and 10 February 2018.

| Team 1 | Score | Team 2 |
|---|---|---|
| Tamil Nadu | 2–0 | Odisha |
| Delhi | 1–2 | Railways |
| Punjab | 0–2 | West Bengal |
| Manipur | 3–0 | Haryana |

| 9 February 2018 | Tamil Nadu | 2–0 | Odisha | Cuttack |
| | | | | Stadium: Barabati Stadium |

| 9 February 2018 | Delhi | 1–2 | Railways | Cuttack |
| | | | | Stadium: Barabati Stadium |

| 10 February 2018 | Punjab | 0–2 | West Bengal | Cuttack |
| | | | | Stadium: Barabati Stadium |

| 10 February 2018 | Manipur | 3–0 | Haryana | Cuttack |
| | | | | Stadium: Barabati Stadium |

== Semi-finals ==
*Semi-finals were played on 12 February 2018.

| Team 1 | Score | Team 2 |
|---|---|---|
| Tamil Nadu | 4–1 | West Bengal |
| Railways | 1–2 | Manipur |

| 12 February 2018 | Tamil Nadu | 4–1 | West Bengal | Cuttack |
| | Sumitra Marandi 23' (o.g.); Indumathi 41', 50'; Indhrani 88' | Report | Barnali Karar 60' | Stadium: Barabati Stadium |

| 12 February 2018 | Railways | 1–2 | Manipur | Cuttack |
| | Kamala Devi 14' | Report | Bala Devi 13', 85' | Stadium: Barabati Stadium |

== Final ==
| 14 February 2018 | Tamil Nadu | 2–1 | Manipur | Cuttack |
| | Indumathi 3'; Indhrani 40' | Report | Ratanbala Devi 57' | Stadium: Barabati Stadium; MVP: Indumathi Kathiresan (Tamil Nadu) |
