= Arifa Zaheer =

Indian footballer

Personal information
- Full name: Arifa Sayed Zaheer
- Date of birth: 17 February 1998 (age 28)
- Place of birth: Mumbai, Maharashtra, India
- Position: Defender

Team information
- Current team: Gokulam Kerala

Youth career
- SRI MA FC

Senior career*
Years	Team	Apps	(Gls)
- Future Star FC
- Community FC India
- Kenkre FC
- Samuel FA
- Sethu
2022–2025	Odisha		
2025–2026	Sribhumi		
2026–	Gokulam Kerala		
- * Club domestic league appearances and goals

Arifa Sayed Zaheer (born 17 February 1998) is an Indian professional footballer from Maharashtra, who plays as a defender for the Indian Women's League club Gokulam Kerala. She was called up for the India women's national football team camp in 2022. Earlier, she played with Kenkre and Sethu.

== Early life ==
She was born in Mumbai but she spent her early years in Kuwait and Saudi Arabia. She started playing with the local Samuel Football Academy and Community Football Club India.

== Career ==
- 2022: She was called up for the Indian Women's Under-23 3-Nations tournament camp.
- 2022: She played for Sethu FC which finished Runners-up in the Indian Women's League 2022.
- 2023: In July, Odisha FC signed her for a two-year period. She will play the sixth Indian Women's League as Odisha FC makes its debut.
- 2023: She played the 27th Senior National Women's Football Championship in Fatorda, Goa.

== Honours ==
Odisha

- Indian Women's League: 2023–24
