= Malappuram District Sports Complex & Football Academy =

Malappuram District Sports Complex മലപ്പുറം ജില്ലാ കായിക സമുച്ചയം
- Sports Complex
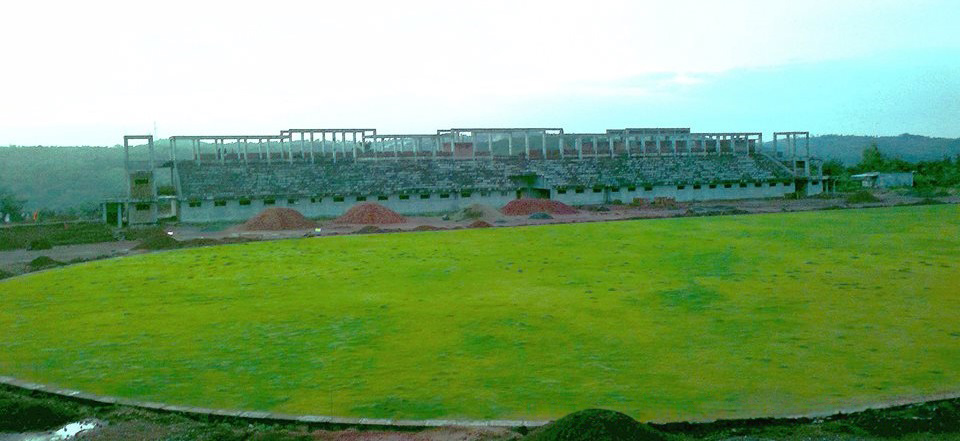
- A view of the stadium

- Location within Kerala Location within India
- Coordinates: 11.1004°N 76.1548°E
- Country: India
- State: Kerala
- District: Malappuram

Languages
  - Official: Malayalam, English
- Time zone: UTC+5:30 (IST)

Malappuram District Sports Complex is a sports complex owned by Malappuram District Sports Council, which is located between Payyanad, Manjeri and Malappuram, Kerala, India. The Malappuram District Sports Complex Stadium hosted 2013–14 Indian Federation Cup.
