= Mousumi Murmu =

Indian women's footballer

Personal information
- Full name: Mousumi Murmu
- Date of birth: 26 December 2004 (age 21)
- Place of birth: Tilakhuli, Salboni, West Bengal, India
- Position: Midfielder

Team information
- Current team: Gokulam Kerala

Senior career*
| Years | Team | Apps | (Gls) |
- Rampur Milan Sangha
- Police AC
| 2022–2023 | East Bengal | | |
| 2023–2026 | Sribhumi | | |
| 2026– | Gokulam Kerala | 0 | (0) |

International career^{‡}
| 2023 | India U20 | 3 | (0) |
| 2024– | India | 5 | (0) |
- * Club domestic league appearances and goals ‡ National team caps and goals as of 11 October 2026

Mousumi Murmu (born 26 December 2004) is an Indian professional footballer from West Bengal who plays for the Indian Women's League club Gokulam Kerala and the India women's national football team. She plays as a midfielder or a forward. She has also previously represented the club East Bengal.

== Early life and career ==
Murmu hailed from Tilakhuli village near Salboni in Paschim Medinipur in West Bengal. Murmu made her senior India debut in July 2024 against Myanmar in the final friendly match at New Delhi. Earlier in June, she was selected for the National camp to be held at the National Centre of Excellence in Kolkata. In February 2025, the new chief coach Crispin Chettri included her in the National camp to be held at Anantapur, Andhra Pradesh from 7 February 2025. She made her senior India debut against Jordan at the Al Hamriya Sports Club Stadium, Sharjah on 20 February 2025.

In December 2024, she represented West Bengal in the 29th Rajmata Jijabai Trophy held at Narainpur, Chhattisgarh, for the Rajmata Jijabai Trophy 2024–2025.

== Career statistics ==
=== International ===
As of 11 October 2026

| National team | Year | Caps | Goals |
|---|---|---|---|
| India | 2024 | 1 | 0 |
| India | 2025 | 2 | 0 |
| India | 2026 | 2 | 0 |
| Total | | 5 | 0 |
