= 2021 AFC Women's Club Championship =

Tournament details
- Host country: Jordan
- City: Amman
- Dates: 7–13 November
- Teams: 4 (from 4 associations)

Final positions
- Champions: (Jordan) Amman SC (1st title)
- Runners-up: (Iran) Shahrdari Sirjan
- Third place: (India) Gokulam Kerala
- Fourth place: (Uzbekistan) Bunyodkor

Tournament statistics
- Matches played: 6
- Goals scored: 15 (2.5 per match)
- Attendance: 1,681 (280 per match)
- Top scorer: 4 players (2 goals)

The 2021 AFC Women's Club Championship (also known as the AFC Women's Club Championship 2021 Pilot Tournament (West)) was the second edition of AFC's premier women's club football competition, held between 7 and 13 November. Four clubs from four associations competed.

== Teams ==
The following teams played in the West Zone tournament.

Team	Qualifying method	App. (last)
(Uzbekistan) FC Bunyodkor	2020 Uzbek women's football championship champions	1st
(India) Gokulam Kerala FC	2019–20 Indian Women's League champions (Note: The All India Football Federation (AIFF) nominated Gokulam Kerala to represent India.)	1st
(Iran) Shahrdari Sirjan FC	2020–21 Kowsar League champions	1st
(Jordan) Amman SC	2021 Jordan Women's Football League champions	1st

Initially, an East Zone tournament including teams from Thailand, Vietnam, Myanmar and Taiwan, was also announced. In late July, it was announced that due to COVID-19 restrictions, there was no interest from the clubs in the East to host the tournament, and it was subsequently cancelled.

== Format ==
Teams played in a single round-robin.

Tiebreakers

Teams were ranked according to points (3 points for a win, 1 point for a draw, 0 points for a loss), and if tied on points, the following tiebreaking criteria were applied, in the order given, to determine the rankings:

1. Points in head-to-head matches among tied teams;
2. Goal difference in head-to-head matches among tied teams;
3. Goals scored in head-to-head matches among tied teams;
4. If more than two teams are tied, and after applying all head-to-head criteria above, a subset of teams are still tied, all head-to-head criteria above are reapplied exclusively to this subset of teams;
5. Goal difference in all group matches;
6. Goals scored in all group matches;
7. Penalty shoot-out if only two teams are tied and they met in the last round of the group;
8. Disciplinary points (yellow card = 1 point, red card as a result of two yellow cards = 3 points, direct red card = 3 points, yellow card followed by direct red card = 4 points);
9. Drawing of lots.

Schedule
Matchday	Dates
Matchday 1	7 November 2021
Matchday 2	10 November 2021
Matchday 3	13 November 2021

== Standings ==
Pos	Team	Pld	W	D	L	GF	GA	GD	Pts
1	(Jordan) Amman (H, C)	3	2	0	1	4	3	+1	6 (Note: Head-to-head points: Amman 3, Shahrdari Sirjan 0.)
2	(Iran) Shahrdari Sirjan	3	2	0	1	4	3	+1	6
3	(India) Gokulam Kerala	3	1	0	2	4	4	0	3
4	(Uzbekistan) Bunyodkor	3	1	0	2	3	5	−2	3

Source: AFC
Rules for classification: Group stage tiebreakers
(C) Champions; (H) Hosts

== Matches ==
All times were in EET (UTC+2).

7 November 2021
16:00

Bunyodkor (Uzbekistan)	1–2	(Iran) Shahrdari Sirjan
Nozimova 77' (pen.)	Report	Jalal Nasab 6'; Alizadeh 65'

Aqaba Development Corporation Stadium, Amman
Attendance: 150
Referee: Casey Reibelt (Australia)
7 November 2021
19:00

Gokulam Kerala (India)	1–2	(Jordan) Amman
Acheampong 33'	Report	Jbarah 59' (pen.); Ouni 67'

Aqaba Development Corporation Stadium, Amman
Attendance: 324
Referee: Pansa Chaisanit (Thailand)

10 November 2021
16:00

Shahrdari Sirjan (Iran)	1–0	(India) Gokulam Kerala
Chatrenoor 68'	Report

Aqaba Development Corporation Stadium, Amman
Attendance: 100
Referee: Bùi Thị Thu Trang (Vietnam)
10 November 2021
19:00

Amman (Jordan)	0–1	(Uzbekistan) Bunyodkor
	Report	Nozimova 90' (pen.)

Aqaba Development Corporation Stadium, Amman
Attendance: 538
Referee: Yoshimi Yamashita (Japan)

13 November 2021
16:00

Bunyodkor (Uzbekistan)	1–3	(India) Gokulam Kerala
Zoirova 63'	Report	Acheampong 34'; Kalyan 62' (pen.); Páez 68'

Aqaba Development Corporation Stadium, Amman
Attendance: 114
Referee: Oh Hyeon-jeong (South Korea)
13 November 2021
19:00

Amman (Jordan)	2–1	(Iran) Shahrdari Sirjan
Jbarah 45+1' (pen.); Jebreen 83'	Report	Chatrenoor 90+6' (pen.)

Aqaba Development Corporation Stadium, Amman
Attendance: 455
Referee: Lara Lee (Australia)

== Goalscorers ==
Rank	Player	Team	MD1	MD2	MD3	Total
1	(Ghana) Elshaddai Acheampong	(India) Gokulam Kerala	1		1	2
1	(Iran) Afsaneh Chatrenoor	(Iran) Shahrdari Sirjan		1	1	2
1	(Jordan) Maysa Jbarah	(Jordan) Amman	1		1	2
1	(Uzbekistan) Dildora Nozimova	(Uzbekistan) FC Bunyodkor	1	1		2
5	(Iran) Zahra Alizadeh	(Iran) Shahrdari Sirjan	1			1
5	(Jordan) Shahnaz Jebreen	(Jordan) Amman			1	1
5	(India) Manisha Kalyan	(India) Gokulam Kerala			1	1
5	(Iran) Roghayeh Jalal Nasab	(Iran) Shahrdari Sirjan	1			1
5	(Tunisia) Samia Ouni	(Jordan) Amman	1			1
5	(Colombia) Karen Páez	(India) Gokulam Kerala			1	1
5	(Uzbekistan) Umida Zoirova	(Uzbekistan) FC Bunyodkor			1	1

== See also ==
Continental Club Championship

- 2021 AFC Champions League (Asia)
- 2021 CAF Women's Champions League (Africa)
- 2021 Copa Libertadores Femenina (South America)
- 2021–22 UEFA Women's Champions League (Europe)

Regional Club Championship

- 2021 UNCAF Women's Interclub Championship (Central America)
- 2021 WAFF Women's Clubs Championship (West Asia)
