= Philomena Abakah =

Ghanaian footballer (born 2002)

Personal information
- Full name: Philomena Abakah
- Date of birth: 1 November 2002 (age 24)
- Place of birth: Accra, Greater Accra, Ghana
- Height: 1.86 m (6 ft 1 in)
- Position: Striker

Team information
- Current team: Ünye
- Number: 27

Senior career*
Years	Team	Apps	(Gls)
- Berry Ladies
- Simba Queens
- Ampem Darkoa
- Kickstart
- Sribhumi
2026–	Ünye	8	(1)

International career
- Ghana
- * Club domestic league appearances and goals as of 14 November 2026

Philomena Abakah (born November 1, 2002) is a Ghanaian professional footballer who plays as a forward for Ünye in the Turkish Women's Super League and the Ghana women's national football team. She previously played for Berry Ladies.

== Club career ==
Abakah started her football career in Ghana where she played for Berry Ladies. In 2022, she joined Tanzanian giants Simba Queens on a two-year deal.

She played for Simba Queens and helped the team to qualify to compete in the 2022 CAF Women's Champions League after defeating She Corporate from Uganda 1–0 in the qualifiers final at the Azam Complex in Dar es Salaam. The victory made them the champions of the Central Africa Football Association (CECAFA) Zonal title.

At the end of her two-year spell, she joined Ghanaian side, Ampem Darkoa Ladies and featured in the Women's Premier Super Cup held Kyebi.

In August 2026, she moved to Turkey, and signed with the Women's Super League club Ünye.

== International career ==
Abakah was part of the Black Queens team that sealed qualification to the 2024 Women's Africa Cup of Nations which will be held in Morocco. She earned a late call-up into the Black Queens ahead of their fixture against the Les Guépard femelle the Benin national team.

Abakah made her first appearance for the Black Queens during the final round of the 2024 CAF Women's Olympic qualifying tournament against Zambia in Ndola which Ghana drew 3–3, but failed to qualify for their first-ever Olympic appearance due to a final aggregate score was 4–3 in favour of Zambia.

== Personal life ==
Philomena Abakah was born in Accra, Ghana on 1 November 2002.

On 25 December 2023, she made a donation to the Human Service Trust orphanage and widow home in Cape Coast. Among the items were soft drinks, water, toiletries and foodstuff.
