= Sibani Devi Nongmeikapam =

Indian footballer

Sibani Devi
Personal information
- Full name: Sibani Devi Nongmeikapam
- Date of birth: 13 January 2007 (age 19)
- Place of birth: Manipur, India
- Height: 1.58 m (5 ft 2 in)
- Position: Forward

Team information
- Current team: Nita

Senior career*
Years	Team	Apps	(Gls)
- Eastern Sporting Union
- United Pukhao SA
2022–2024	East Bengal	10	(2)
2024–2026	Sribhumi	19	(3)
2026–	Nita		

International career^{‡}
2023	India U17		
2025–	India U20	17	(10)
2025–	India	3	(1)
- * Club domestic league appearances and goals as of 9 January 2026 ‡ National team caps and goals as of 11 October 2026

Sibani Devi Nongmeikapam (Meitei: Nongmeikapam Sibani Devi, born 13 January 2007) is an Indian professional footballer from Manipur, who plays as a forward for the Indian Women's League club Nita and the India women's national football team. She also played for the East Bengal in the IWL.

== Early life ==
Devi is from Manipur. She is the daughter of Itocha Singh Nongmeikapam, who formerly played for Mohun Bagan and Dempo and currently a football coach. Her brother Sridarth Nongmeikapam has also represented the India national under-17 football team.

== Career ==
She was selected in the 23-player Indian squad by Indian coach Joakim Alexandersson and she played the second of the two FIFA international friendlies at the Padukone-Dravid Centre for Sports Excellence in Bengaluru. Thus, she made her Senior India debut in the friendlies against the Maldives at Bengaluru on 2 January 2025. She also represented the Indian team and scored the winner in the AFC Under-17 Women's Asia Cup qualifiers at Bishkek, Kyrgyz Republic on 26 April 2023. They defeated Kyrgyz Republic 1-0. Later, she was part of the National camp ahead of the AFC U-17 Women's Asian Cup Qualifiers Round 2 in September 2023. She was also part of the Indian team which won the SAFF Under 19 Football Championship at Dhaka in February 2024.

She played for East Bengal in the Indian Women's League in 2023–2024. On 24 December 2023, she scored the equaliser against Sethu FC, but East Bengal lost the match 2–4 in Kolkata. On 10 December 2023, she also scored against in East Bengal's 2–0 win over Odisha FC at Bhubaneswar.

She scored a brace against Chinese Taipei in India's 3–1 victory in the final match of the group stage at the 2026 AFC U-20 Women's Asian Cup.

== Career statistics ==
=== International ===
As of 11 October 2026

National team	Year	Caps	Goals
India	2025	1	1
India	2026	2	0
Total		3	1

Scores and results list India's goal tally first.

List of international goals scored by Sibani Devi
No.	Date	Venue	Opponent	Score	Result	Competition
1.	2 January 2025	Padukone – Dravid Centre for Sports Excellence, Bengaluru, India	Maldives	6–1	11–1	Friendly
