= Sribhumi FC =

Indian association football club based in Kolkata

Sribhumi
- Full name: Sribhumi Football Club
- Founded: 2019; 7 years ago
- Owner: Sujit Bose
- Head coach: Sujata Kar
- League: M: CFL Premier Division; W: Indian Women's League Calcutta Women's Football League
- 2025–26: IWL, 7th of 8 (relegated)
Home colours	Away colours

Sribhumi Football Club (Bengali: শ্রীভূমি ফুটবল ক্লাব), also known as Sreebhumi, is an Indian professional football section of Sribhumi Sporting Club. It is a residential club based in Chandannagar, Hooghly district, about 40km from Kolkata, West Bengal. The club last played in the Calcutta Football League. Their women's team participated in Indian Women's League, and currently participates in the Calcutta Women's Football League.

== History ==
The club was founded in 2019, as part of the Sribhumi Sporting Club. The club participated in the 2019–20 season of the Indian Women's League, where they bowed out in the group stage finishing fourth with five points. For the 2020–2021, the club was invited into the final round after SSB Women's FC, failed to confirm their participation. Since there was no women's league in West Bengal, Sreebhumi was invited based on their previous season's performance. In 2023–2024, the Indian Women's League was expanded to two tiers. The club took part in Tier 2 and won the championship, and were promoted to Tier 1 again for the 2024–2025 season. In the season opener in their away match at Chennai, they gave a tough fight to Sethu FC, before losing 0–1 on 12 January 2025.

Considered upstarts in the echelons of Bengal football, they have managed to remain competitive in the state and national tiers and have developed a women's football derby with their city rivals East Bengal.

== Women's team ==
=== Squad ===
As of December 2025

Note: Flags indicate national team as defined under FIFA eligibility rules; some limited exceptions apply. Players may hold more than one non-FIFA nationality.

No.	Pos.	Nation	Player
1	GK	IND	Monalisha Devi Moirangthem
2	DF	IND	Poonam Sharma
3	DF	IND	Arifa Zaheer
5	MF	IND	Barnali Karar
6	MF	IND	Arina Devi Nameirakpam
8	DF	IND	Sanju Yadav
9	FW	GHA	Veronica Appiah
10	FW	IND	Bala Devi Ngangom
13	FW	IND	Grace Dangmei (captain)
15	DF	IND	Mugli Saren
16	FW	IND	Sibani Devi Nongmeikapam
18	FW	IND	Mousumi Murmu

No.	Pos.	Nation	Player
20	DF	GHA	Felicia Daw Owusu
22	FW	IND	Renu Gour
23	FW	GHA	Philomena Abakah
24	MF	IND	Barnali Mahata
25	DF	IND	Mamta Verma
27	FW	IND	MK Kashmina
28	DF	IND	Sonda Mondal
30	MF	IND	Sushmita Bardhan
34	DF	IND	Gita Das
35	MF	IND	Kabita Saren
37	FW	IND	Kamala Devi Yumnam
41	GK	IND	Beauty Tudu
—	MF	IND	Ratanbala Devi Nongmaithem
—	MF	IND	Anju Tamang

== Personnel ==
=== Technical staff ===
As of December 2025

Position	Name
Head coach	(India) Sujata Kar
Assistant coach	(India) Itocha Singh Nongmeikapam
Goalkeeping coach	(India) Ronibala Chanu Lourembam
Physio	(India) Aloka Paswan
Team manager	(India) Anindya Mondal
Photographer	(India) Sushma Singh
Admin. Head	(India) Priya Roy
Technical Director	(India) Sukla Dutta

== Seasons ==
Season	National level		State level			
Season	League	Place	League	Place	Cup	Place
2019–20	IWL	Group stage	CWFL	Runners-up ▲	No cup organised	
2020–21	Not eligible		CWFL	Semi-finals	No cup organised	
2021–22	Not eligible		CWFL	Quarter-finals	No cup organised	
2022–23	Not eligible		CWFL	Runners-up ▲	No cup organised	
2023–24	IWL 2	1st ▲	CWFL	Champions	IFA; Shield	Runners-up
2024–25	IWL	3rd	CWFL	Runners-up	IFA; Shield	—N/a
2025–26	IWL	7th ▼	CWFL		IFA; Shield	
2026–27	IWL 2		CWFL		IFA; Shield	

== Honours ==
=== Domestic ===
- Indian Women's League 2
  - Champions (1): 2023–24

=== Regional ===
- Calcutta Women's Football League (Kanyashree Cup)
  - Champions (1): 2023–24
  - Runners-up (3): 2019, 2022–23, 2024–25
- Women's IFA Shield
  - Runners-up (1): 2023
