= CSB Bank =

Indian bank

CSB Bank Limited
- Formerly: Catholic Syrian Bank Limited
- Type: Public
- Traded as: BSE: 542867; NSE: CSBBANK
- Industry: Banking; Financial services
- Founded: 26 November 1920; 105 years ago
- Headquarters: Thrissur city, Kerala, India
- Number of locations: 862 branches (2026)
- Key people: Pralay Mondal (MD & CEO)
- Products: Consumer banking, Corporate banking, Mortgage loans, Private banking, Wealth management, Investment banking
- Revenue: ▲₹5,681.79 crore (US$590 million) (2026)
- Operating income: ▲₹1,085.39 crore (US$110 million) (2026)
- Net income: ▲₹633.18 crore (US$66 million) (2026)
- Total assets: ▲₹57,726.52 crore (US$6.0 billion) (2026)
- Owner: Fairfax Financial
- Number of employees: 8187 (2026)
- Capital ratio: 20.66%
- Website: www.csb.bank.in

CSB Bank Limited (erstwhile Catholic Syrian Bank Limited) is an Indian private sector bank with its headquarters at Thrissur city, Kerala, India. As of 31 March 2026, the bank had a network of 862 branches and 832 ATMs/CRMs across India.

== History ==
CSB was founded on 26 November 1920, and opened for business on 1 January 1921 with an authorized capital of ₹ 5 lakhs and a paid-up capital of ₹ 45,270.

In 1969, it was included in the Second Schedule of the Reserve Bank of India Act and the Bank became a Scheduled Bank. The bank achieved Scheduled Bank – A Class, status by 1975.

In Dec 2016, RBI allowed Fairfax Financial Holdings to acquire 51% of the bank and in Feb 2018, Fairfax India (via FIH Mauritius Investments Ltd) acquired 51% of the bank for Rs.1180 Crores.

The terms of investment include a mandatory 5-year lock-in period and 15 years to pare the stake in multiple tranches as per RBI's norms.

As of March 2019, the bank had a significant presence in Maharashtra, Tamil Nadu, Kerala and Karnataka with a customer base of nearly 1.3 million people and its credit portfolio focused on agriculture, MSMEs, education, and housing.

The bank went public on Dec 4, 2019 and the shares are listed in BSE and NSE.

== Sponsorship ==
Kerala based I-League club Gokulam Kerala FC is being sponsored by CSB Bank.

== See also ==
- Banking in India
- List of banks in India
- Reserve Bank of India
- Indian Financial System Code
- List of largest banks
- List of companies of India
- Make in India
