= Kerala Women's League =

- Organising body: Kerala Football Association
- Founded: 2014; 12 years ago
- Country: India
- Number of clubs: 8
- Level on pyramid: 3
- Promotion to: Indian Women's League 2
- Current champions: Gokulam Kerala (4th title) (2025–26)
- Most championships: Gokulam Kerala (4 titles)
- Broadcaster(s): Scoreline Sports (YouTube)
- Current: 2025–26

The Kerala Women's League (KWL) is a professional women's football league in the Indian state of Kerala. It is in the third tier of Indian woman’s football system. The league is organised by the Kerala Football Association (KFA), the official football governing body of the state. For sponsorship ties with Eastea, it is officially called as Eastea Kerala Women's League.

== History ==
The inaugural tournament was held in the 2014–15, followed by the 2015–16 season. It wasn't held ever since until the 2021–22 season.

== Clubs ==
=== 2025–26 season ===
No.	Team	Location
1	City Club Chalakkudy	Chalakkudy
2	Dreams FC	Kochi
3	Gokulam Kerala	Kozhikode
4	Inter Kerala FC	Kothamangalam
5	Kerala United FC	Thrissur
6	Lords FA	Kochi
7	PFC Kerala	Parappur
8	Talents FA	Palakkad

== Champions ==
Edition	Season	Champion	Runners-up
1st	2014–15	Wayanad Women's FC	Marthoma College WFC
2nd	2015–16	Marthoma College WFC	Quartz
League Suspended
3rd	2021–22	Gokulam Kerala	Don Bosco FA
4th	2022–23	Lords FA	Gokulam Kerala
5th	2023–24	Gokulam Kerala	Lords FA
6th	2024–25	Gokulam Kerala	Kerala United
7th	2025–26	Gokulam Kerala	Lords FA

== See also ==
- Football in India
- Football in Kerala
