= Gokulam Kerala FC (women) =

Indian women's association football team

Gokulam Kerala Women
- Full name: Gokulam Kerala Football Club Women
- Nickname: The Malabarians
- Short name: GKFC
- Founded: January 2018; 8 years ago
- Ground: EMS Stadium; Malappuram District Sports Complex Stadium
- Capacity: 50,000; 30,000
- Owner: Sree Gokulam Group
- President: V. C. Praveen
- Head coach: Raman Vijayan
- League: Indian Women's League; Kerala Women's League
- 2025–26: IWL, 5th of 8 KWL, Champions
- Website: gokulamkeralafc.com
Home colours	Away colours

Gokulam Kerala FC Women is an Indian women's football section of Gokulam Kerala FC. They participated in Indian Women's League (IWL), the premier women's football league in India. They won their first IWL in 2019–20 season. They then retained the title in 2021–22 and 2022–23. In 2021, they became the first club to represent India in AFC Women's Club Championship.

== Crest ==
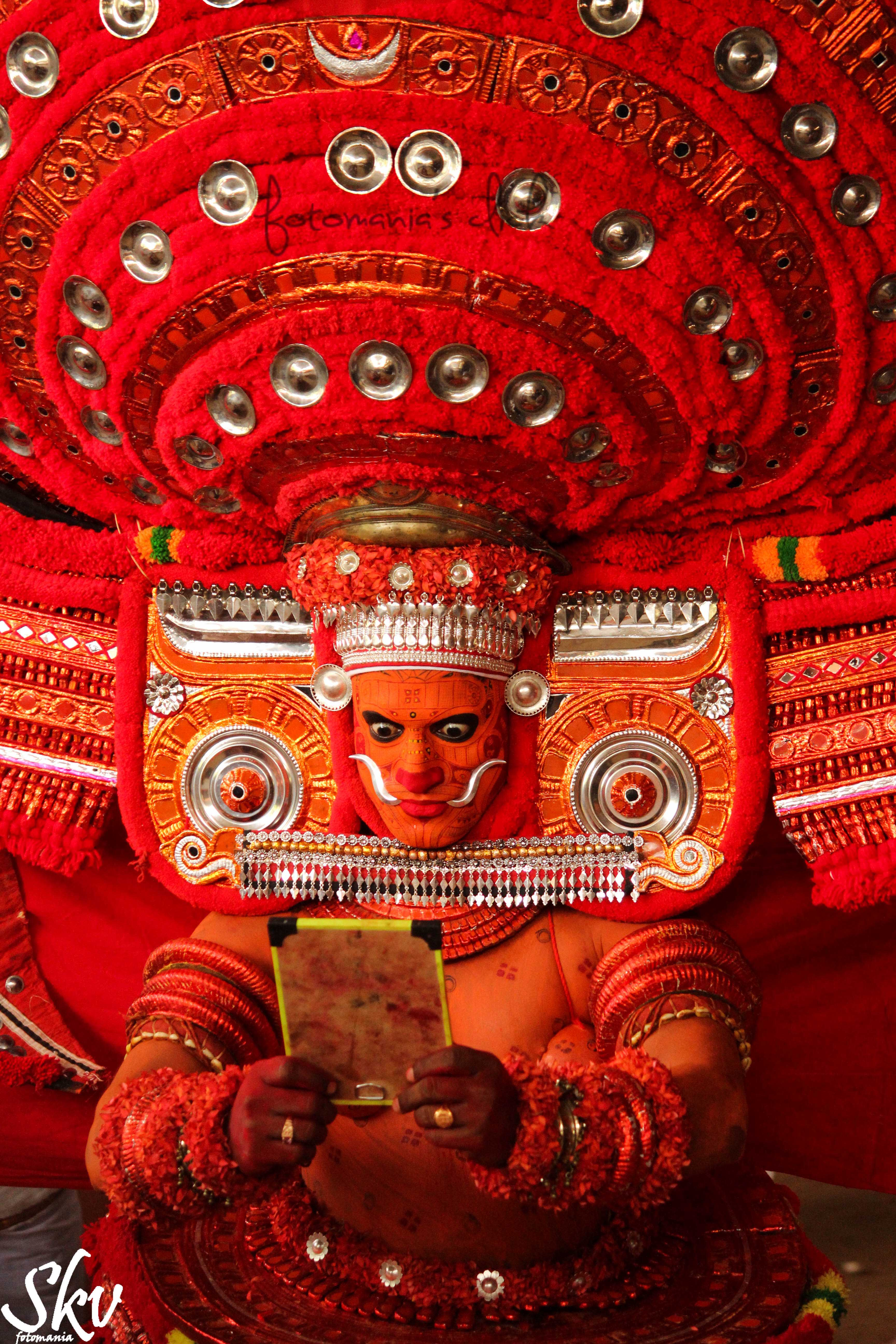
Theyyam is a popular ritual form of worship in North Kerala

The club logo incorporates elements from historical Theyyam, a famous ritual art form that originated in northern Kerala. It encompasses dance, mime and music.

== Stadium ==
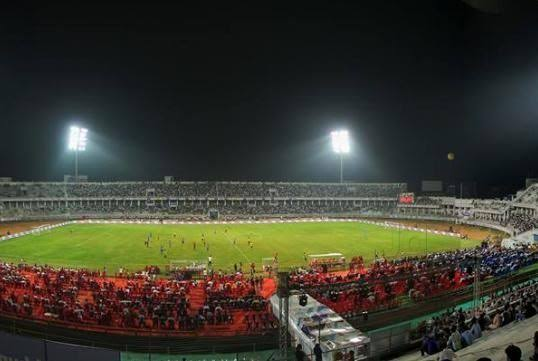
EMS Stadium on a matchday

Gokulam Kerala Women plays most of its home matches at the EMS Stadium, which is located in the heart of Calicut. They used the Malappuram District Sports Complex Stadium after allegations surfaced that the corporation authorities were not happy with the state of the EMS Stadium under GKFC's maintenance.

== Supporters ==
Kerala is a state known for its passionate football fans. "GKFC Battalia" is one of the largest supporters' group of Gokulam Kerala FC. Another noted supporters' group of the club is named "GKFC Ultras".

== Technical staff ==
As of December 2025

Position	Name
Head coach	(India) Raman Vijayan
Assistant coach	(India) Priyanka Kangralkar
Goalkeeper coach	
Strength and conditioning coach	
Team manager	(India) Ursha Mitra
Physio	(India) Ramya V Shetty
Nutritionist	(India) Anjali
Video Analyst	
Media Manager	(India) Muhammad Sufail

== Squad ==
As of 13 November 2026

Note: Flags indicate national team as defined under FIFA eligibility rules; some limited exceptions apply. Players may hold more than one non-FIFA nationality.

No.	Pos.	Nation	Player
1	GK	IND	Shreya Hooda
2	DF	IND	Arifa Zaheer
3	DF	IND	Alina Chingakham
4	DF	IND	Baby Lalchhandami (captain)
7	MF	IND	Menaka Devi Lourembam
8	FW	IND	Priyadharshini Selladurai
9	MF	IND	Renu Gour
11	FW	IND	Amisha Baxla
13	DF	KEN	Phoeby Okech Owiti
15	DF	IND	Sahena Thongkhongmayum
16	DF	IND	Shubhangi Singh
17	MF	IND	Priyanka Kashyap
18	DF	IND	Theertha Laskhmi E.

No.	Pos.	Nation	Player
19	DF	IND	Trisha Mallick
20	FW	IND	Shilji Shaji
21	GK	IND	Sowmiya Narayanasamy
22	MF	IND	Arathy P. M.
23	MF	IND	Remi Thokchom
24	FW	BDI	Asha Djafari
26	MF	IND	Mousumi Murmu
27	MF	IND	Priyasa Sarkar
28	FW	IND	Greeshma M. P.
30	FW	MAW	Vanessa Chikupila
31	GK	IND	Laya Balasubramaniam

== Coaching history ==
Dates	Name	Ref
2017–2020	(India) Priya P. V.	
2021–2022	(India) Anthony Andrews	
2022	(India) Priya P. V.	
2022–2024	(India) Anthony Andrews	
2024–2025	(India) Ranjan Chowdhury	
2025–	(India) Raman Vijayan	

== Club captains ==
List of Gokulam Kerala Women's Football Team captains since its establishment.

Period	Name
2017–2018	(India) Anita Rawat
2019–2020	(India) Michel Castanha
2021–2022	(India) Aditi Chauhan
2022–2023	(India) Ashalata Devi Loitongbam
2023–2024	(India) Grace Dangmei
2024–2025	(India) Ratanbala Devi Nongmaithem
2025–	(India) Roja Devi Asem

== Seasons ==
As of 17 July 2025

Season	Indian Women's League									KWL	AFC Championship/ AFC Champions League	League Top Scorer	
Season	Tier	Pld	W	D	L	GF	GA	Pts	Pos	KWL	AFC Championship/ AFC Champions League	Name(s)	Goals
2017–18	1	6	1	1	4	6	12	4	5th	DNP	–	(Uganda) Fazila Ikwaput	5
2018–19	1	6	5	0	1	18	5	15	Semi Finals	DNP	–	(India) Anju Tamang	5
2019–20	1	7	7	0	0	34	4	15	Champions	DNP	–	(Nepal) Sabitra Bhandari	16
2020–21	1	0	0	0	0	0	0	0	NA	DNP	3rd		
2021–22	1	11	11	0	0	66	4	33	Champions	Champions	AIFF suspended by FIFA	(Ghana) Elshaddai Acheampong	20
2022–23	1	10	8	2	0	64	7	26	Champions	Runners Up	GS	(Nepal) Sabitra Bhandari	29
2023–24	1	12	9	2	1	33	5	29	Runners Up	Champions	DNQ	(Uganda) Fazila Ikwaput	13
2024–25	1	14	9	2	3	30	14	29	Runners Up	Champions	DNQ	(Uganda) Fazila Ikwaput	24
2025–26	1	0	0	0	0	0	0	0		Champions	DNQ		

== Performance in AFC competitions ==
=== AFC Women's Club Championship ===
Winner of the 2020–21 Indian Women's League season would originally get the chance to participate in 2021 edition of AFC Women's Club Championship. As a backup, if the season is unable to complete, defending champions of 2019–20 season, Gokulam Kerala FC, will qualify for the event. Later, on 15 July 2021, the All India Football Federation (AIFF) nominated Gokulam Kerala to represent India in the AFC Women's Club Championship 2020–21 pilot tournament.

Season	Competition	Round	Club	Score	Position	Top scorer
2021	AFC Women's Club Championship	Round-robin	(Jordan) Amman	1–2	3rd place, bronze medalist(s)	(Ghana) Elshaddai Achempong (2 goals)
2021	AFC Women's Club Championship	Round-robin	(Iran) Shahrdari Sirjan	0–1	3rd place, bronze medalist(s)	(Ghana) Elshaddai Achempong (2 goals)
2021	AFC Women's Club Championship	Round-robin	(Uzbekistan) Bunyodkor	3–1	3rd place, bronze medalist(s)	(Ghana) Elshaddai Achempong (2 goals)
2022	AFC Women's Club Championship	Group stage	(Uzbekistan) Sogdiyona Jizzak	Match abandoned due to FIFA ban on AIFF		
2022	AFC Women's Club Championship	Group stage	(Iran) Bam Khatoon	Match abandoned due to FIFA ban on AIFF		
2023	AFC Women's Club Championship	Group stage	(Japan) Urawa Red Diamonds	0–7	GS (2nd)	(Ghana) Veronica Appiah (3 goals)
2023	AFC Women's Club Championship	Group stage	(Chinese Taipei) Hualien	1–1	GS (2nd)	(Ghana) Veronica Appiah (3 goals)
2023	AFC Women's Club Championship	Group stage	(Thailand) Bangkok	4–3	GS (2nd)	(Ghana) Veronica Appiah (3 goals)

== Honours ==
=== Continental ===
- AFC Women's Club Championship
  - Third place (1): 2021

=== Domestic ===
- Indian Women's League
  - Champions (3): 2019–20, 2021–22, 2022–23
  - Runners-up (1): 2024–25
- Kerala Women's League
  - Champions (4): 2021–22, 2023–24, 2024–25, 2025–26
  - Runners-up (1): 2022–23

=== Recognitions ===
- IWL Roll of Honours
  - Best Match Organisation (1): 2024–25
