= 2021–22 Indian Women's League =

Indian Women's League
- Season: 2021–22
- Dates: 15 April – 26 May 2022
- Champions: Gokulam Kerala; 2nd title
- AFC Club Championship: Gokulam Kerala
- Matches: 66
- Goals: 300 (4.55 per match)
- Best Player: Manisha Kalyan
- Top goalscorer: Elshaddai Acheampong (20 goals)
- Best goalkeeper: Maibam Linthoingambi Devi
- Highest scoring: Odisha Police 0–12 Gokulam Kerala
- Longest winning run: Gokulam Kerala (11 matches)
- Longest unbeaten run: Gokulam Kerala (11 matches)
- Longest winless run: Hans Women (10 matches)
- Longest losing run: Hans Women (10 matches)

The 2021–22 Indian Women's League (also known as Hero Indian Women's League for sponsorship reasons) was the fifth season of the Indian Women's League, the top division women's professional football league in India. The qualifying round was held from 1–5 April 2022 at the Ambedkar Stadium in New Delhi. The final round was scheduled to kick-off from mid-April in Bhubaneswar, Odisha and continue till the last week of May. On 26 May, Gokulam Kerala successfully defended their title with a convincing win against Sethu in a title decider on the last matchday, and became the first club to do it.

== Qualifiers ==
=== Teams ===
Locations of the Indian Women's League Qualifier teams

Club	City	State/Region
ARA	Ahmedabad	Gujarat
Golazo	Hamirpur	Himachal Pradesh
Guwahati City	Guwahati	Assam
Young Welfare	Imphal	Manipur

=== Table ===
The following four teams from four states played each other once during April in the qualifying round at the Ambedkar Stadium in New Delhi.

Pos	Team	Pld	W	D	L	GF	GA	GD	Pts	Qualification
1	ARA	3	3	0	0	27	3	+24	9	Main round
2	Young Welfare	3	2	0	1	9	4	+5	6	
3	Guwahati City	3	0	1	2	0	14	−14	1	
4	Golazo	3	0	1	2	0	15	−15	1	

Source: AIFF
Rules for classification: 1) points; 2) head-to-head points; 3) head-to-head goal difference; 4) goal difference; 5) number of goals scored; 6) drawing of lots

=== Matches ===
1 April 2022	Guwahati City	0–12	ARA	New Delhi, Delhi
08:00 IST		Report	Shreya Oza 9', 16', 20'; Anju 54', 74', 90+1'; Madhubala Alawe 60', 80', 86'; Kiran 14', 53'; Poonam 48'	Stadium: Ambedkar Stadium

1 April 2022	Golazo	0–4	Young Welfare	New Delhi, Delhi
11:00 IST		Report	Salam Rinaroy Devi 34', 38'; Toijam Thoibisana Chanu 53', 62'	Stadium: Ambedkar Stadium

3 April 2022	ARA	11–0	Golazo	New Delhi, Delhi
08:00 IST	Kiran 16', 20', 77'; Shreya Oza 82', 90', 90+1'; Manisha 29', 38'; Poonam 6', 64'; Madhubala Alawe 6'	Report		Stadium: Ambedkar Stadium

3 April 2022	Young Welfare	2–0	Guwahati City	New Delhi, Delhi
11:00 IST	Salam Rinaroy Devi 1'; Toijam Thoibisana Chanu 63'	Report		Stadium: Ambedkar Stadium

5 April 2022	Guwahati City	0–0	Golazo	New Delhi, Delhi
08:00 IST		Report		Stadium: Ambedkar Stadium

5 April 2022	ARA	4–3	Young Welfare	New Delhi, Delhi
11:00 IST	Shreya Oza 6', 19'; Anju 68'; Kiran 87'	Report	Salam Rinaroy Devi 27'; Hoineihat 53'; Remi Thokchom 77'	Stadium: Ambedkar Stadium

== Clubs ==
Locations of the Indian Women's League teams
Locations of the stadiums for IWL

=== Stadiums and locations ===
The matches were played at three venues located in Bhubaneswar, Odisha; Kalinga Stadium, O.S.A.P 7th Battalion Ground and Capital High School Ground.

Club	City	State/Region
ARA	Ahmedabad	Gujarat
Gokulam Kerala	Kozhikode	Kerala
Hans Women	New Delhi	Delhi
Indian Arrows	Bhubaneswar	Odisha
Kickstart	Bengaluru	Karnataka
Mata Rukmani Girls	Bastar	Chhattisgarh
Odisha Police	Bhubaneswar	Odisha
PIFA Sports (Colaba)	Mumbai	Maharashtra
Sethu	Madurai	Tamil Nadu
Sirvodem	Navelim	Goa
Sports Odisha	Bhubaneswar	Odisha
SSB	Siliguri	West Bengal

=== Personnel and sponsorships ===
Team	Head coach	Captain	Kit manufacturer	Shirt sponsor
ARA	(India) Prit Bhatt	(India) Anju		
Gokulam Kerala	(India) Anthony Andrews	(India) Aditi Chauhan	(India) SEGA	Federal Bank
Hans Women	(India) Arun Mishra	(India) Jyoti Ann Burrett		Kica Active
Indian Arrows	(India) Suren Kumar Chettri	(India) Martina Thokchom	(India) SIX5SIX	
Kickstart	(India) Amrutha Aravind Valliyath	(India) Kshetrimayum Margaret Devi		Haier
Mata Rukmani Girls	(India) Sandeep Singh	(India) Laxmi Mandavi		Goel TMT
Odisha Police	(India) Sradhanjali Samantaray	(India) Sumitra Xalxo	(India) VEGA	Odisha Tourism
PIFA Sports (Colaba)	(India) Nirvan Shah	(India) Karen Pais		Häfele Group
Sethu	(India) Crispin Chettri	(India) Sandhiya Ranganathan	(India) SIX5SIX	COSCO
Sirvodem	(India) Chitra Gangadharan	(India) Ancella Barretto		Fabiana's – Sports & Hospitality
Sports Odisha	(India) Gitanjali Khuntia	(India) Manisa Panna	(India) VEGA	Odisha Tourism
SSB	(India) Juliet Miranda	(India) Dular Marandi		BS

== Foreign players ==
Teams allowed to register maximum of two foreign players. Only one can be part of the starting lineup. Indian Arrows cannot sign any foreign player as they are part of AIFF's developmental program.

Club	Player 1	Player 2
ARA	—	—
Gokulam Kerala	(Myanmar) Win Theingi Tun	(Ghana) Elshaddai Acheampong
Hans Women	—	—
Kickstart	—	—
Mata Rukmani Girls	—	—
Odisha Police	—	—
PIFA Sports (Colaba)	—	—
Sethu	(Kenya) Elizabeth Kioko Katungwa	—
Sirvodem	(Ghana) Ernestina Tetteh	—
Sports Odisha	—	—
SSB	—	—

== League table ==
Pos	Team	Pld	W	D	L	GF	GA	GD	Pts	Qualification
1	Gokulam Kerala (C)	11	11	0	0	66	4	+62	33	Qualification for the 2022–23 Indian Women's League and 2022 AFC Women's Club Championship
2	Sethu	11	10	0	1	42	6	+36	30	Qualification for the 2022–23 Indian Women's League
3	Kickstart	11	9	0	2	33	8	+25	27	Qualification for the 2022–23 Indian Women's League
4	Sports Odisha	11	6	2	3	34	16	+18	20	Qualification for the 2022–23 Indian Women's League
5	Indian Arrows	11	6	1	4	25	9	+16	19	
6	SSB	11	5	1	5	29	22	+7	16	
7	PIFA Sports (Colaba)	11	4	2	5	17	25	−8	14	
8	ARA	11	4	1	6	18	26	−8	13	
9	Sirvodem	11	3	1	7	13	36	−23	10	
10	Odisha Police	11	2	0	9	9	38	−29	6	
11	Mata Rukmani Girls	11	1	0	10	7	60	−53	3 (Note: Head-to-Head points: Mata Rukmani Girls 3, Hans Women 0)	
12	Hans Women	11	1	0	10	7	50	−43	3	

Source: AIFF
Rules for classification: 1) points; 2) head-to-head points; 3) head-to-head goal difference; 4) goal difference; 5) number of goals scored; 6) drawing of lots
(C) Champions

== Results ==
=== Fixture and results ===
All matches were played at neutral venues. The "home" and "away" are designated to identify Team 1 and Team 2 respectively.

Home \ Away	GOK	SET	KIC	SPO	INA	SSB	PIS	ARA	SIR	ODP	MRG	HAW
Gokulam Kerala	—	–	–	7–1	2–1	2–0	6–1	–	4–0	–	8–0	–
Sethu	1–3	—	2–1	4–0	–	6–0	–	3–0	–	–	6–1	–
Kickstart	0–5	–	—	1–0	–	–	–	3–0	–	2–0	–	–
Sports Odisha	–	–	–	—	0–0	–	–	–	9–1	4–1	–	6–0
Indian Arrows	–	0–3	0–1	–	—	–	1–2	–	4–0	–	8–0	2–0
SSB	–	–	0–1	1–1	0–2	—	–	–	–	5–2	7–1	6–2
PIFA Sports	–	1–4	1–3	0–3	–	1–6	—	–	0–0	1–0	–	–
ARA	0–8	–	–	1–3	1–3	2–3	1–1	—	3–1	–	–	–
Sirvodem	–	0–5	0–7	–	–	2–1	–	–	—	–	4–1	–
Odisha Police	0–12	0–3	–	–	0–4	–	–	1–3	2–1	—	–	2–3
Mata Rukmani Girls	–	–	0–10	0–7	–	–	1–3	0–4	–	0–1	—	3–2
Hans Women	0–9	0–5	0–4	–	–	–	0–6	0–3	0–4	–	–	—

Source: AIFF
Legend: Blue = home team win; Yellow = draw; Red = away team win.

=== Results by match ===
The table lists the results of teams after each match.

Match	1	2	3	4	5	6	7	8	9	10	11
ARA	L	L	W	L	W	L	W	D	L	L	W
Gokulam Kerala	W	W	W	W	W	W	W	W	W	W	W
Hans Women	L	L	L	L	L	L	L	L	L	L	W
Indian Arrows	W	D	L	W	W	W	L	W	W	L	L
Kickstart	W	W	W	L	W	W	W	L	W	W	W
Mata Rukmani Girls	L	L	L	W	L	L	L	L	L	L	L
Odisha Police	L	W	L	L	L	W	L	L	L	L	L
PIFA Sports	L	W	D	L	L	W	L	D	W	W	L
Sethu	W	W	W	W	W	W	W	W	W	W	L
Sirvodem	L	L	D	L	L	L	W	W	L	W	L
Sports Odisha	W	D	L	W	W	L	W	D	W	L	W
SSB	W	L	W	W	L	L	L	D	L	W	W

Source: AIFF
W = Win; D = Draw; L = Loss

=== Positions by round ===
The table lists the positions of teams after each round mentioned in official fixtures.

Team ╲ Round	1	2	3	4	5	6	7	8	9	10	11
ARA	7	9	8	8	7	8	7	7	8	8	8
Gokulam Kerala	1	1	1	1	1	1	1	1	1	1	1
Hans Women	9	11	12	12	12	12	12	12	12	12	12
Indian Arrows	4	4	6	6	5	4	5	4	4	4	5
Kickstart	5	2	3	4	3	3	3	3	3	3	3
Mata Rukmani Girls	11	10	11	9	9	10	11	11	11	11	11
Odisha Police	12	8	9	10	10	9	9	10	10	10	10
PIFA Sports	8	6	5	7	8	7	8	8	7	6	7
Sethu	2	3	2	2	2	2	2	2	2	2	2
Sirvodem	10	12	10	11	11	11	10	9	9	9	9
Sports Odisha	6	5	7	5	4	5	4	5	5	5	4
SSB	3	7	4	3	6	6	6	6	6	7	6

Champions

Source: AIFF

== Matches ==
- All times are in IST (UTC+5:30).

=== Round 1 ===
15 April 2022	PIFA Sports	1–3	Kickstart	Bhubaneswar
15:30	Nisilia Majaw 33'	Report	Nirmala Devi Phanjoubam 24'; Irom Prameshwori Devi 33'; Kaviya Pakkirisamy 59'	Stadium: Capital Ground; Attendance: 0 Referee: Kusum Mandi; Player of the Match: Irom Prameshwori Devi (Kickstart)

15 April 2022	SSB Women	6–2	Hans Women	Bhubaneswar
15:30	Purnima Linda 34', 49' (pen.); Huidrom Ranjita Devi 45'; Dular Marandi 57', 80', 90+2'	Report	Savi Mehta 7'; Jyoti 20' (pen.)	Stadium: 7th Battalion Ground; Attendance: 0 Referee: Manjeet Singh; Player of the Match: Dular Marandi (SSB Women)

15 April 2022	Indian Arrows	4–0	Sirvodem	Bhubaneswar
19:30	Naorem Priyangka Devi 8', 83'; Apurna Narzary 23'; Amisha Baxla 27'	Report		Stadium: Kalinga Stadium; Attendance: 0 Referee: Ranjita Devi Tekcham; Player of the Match: Naorem Priyangka Devi (Indian Arrows)

16 April 2022	Odisha Police	0–12	Gokulam Kerala	Bhubaneswar
15:30		Report	Manisha Kalyan 17', 26', 33', 45+3', 73'; Win Theingi Tun 27'; Grace Dangmei 37'; Madhusmita Barick 47' (o.g.); Elshaddai Acheampong 62', 86'; Sorokhaibam Ranjana Chanu 71'; Karishma Shirvoikar 77'	Stadium: Capital Ground; Attendance: 0 Referee: Monika Jana; Player of the Match: Manisha Kalyan (Gokulam Kerala)

16 April 2022	Sethu	6–1	Mata Rukmani Girls	Bhubaneswar
15:30	Kioko Elizabeth Katungwa 3'; Karthika Angamuthu 7'; Mariyammal Balamurugan 15'; Sanju Yadav 22'; Grace Hauhnar 24'; Renu Gour 70'	Report	Reet Kashyap 79'	Stadium: 7th Battalion Ground; Attendance: 0 Referee: Phurki Lhamu Bhutia; Player of the Match: Sanju Yadav (Sethu)

16 April 2022	ARA	1–3	Sports Odisha	Bhubaneswar
19:30	Anju 43'	Report	Pyari Xaxa 53', 79'; Jasoda Munda 90+2'	Stadium: Kalinga Stadium; Attendance: 0 Referee: Ruba Devi G. Player of the Match: Pyari Xaxa (Sports Odisha)

=== Round 2 ===
19 April 2022	Hans Women	0–6	PIFA Sports	Bhubaneswar
15:30		Report	Nisilia Majaw 21', 67'; Lalnunsiami 22', 40'; Karen Pais 50'; Akanksha Kandalkar 64'	Stadium: Capital Ground; Attendance: 0 Referee: Chitrambada Patra; Player of the Match: Nisilia Majaw (PIFA Sports)

19 April 2022	Sports Odisha	0–0	Indian Arrows	Bhubaneswar
15:30		Report		Stadium: 7th Battalion Ground; Attendance: 0 Referee: Rohit; Player of the Match: Sasmita Parida (Sports Odisha)

19 April 2022	Gokulam Kerala	2–0	SSB Women	Bhubaneswar
19:30	Elshaddai Acheampong 57'; Nongmaithem Ratanbala Devi 90+2'	Report		Stadium: Kalinga Stadium; Attendance: 0 Referee: N Kurumaiah; Player of the Match: Manju (SSB Women)

20 April 2022	Sirvodem	0–7	Kickstart	Bhubaneswar
15:30		Report	Kaviya Pakkirisamy 7'; Sharda 9' (o.g.); Yangoijam Kiranbala Chanu 12'; Asem Roja Devi 18', 43'; Irom Prameshwori Devi 26'; Vunglawmching 82'	Stadium: Capital Ground; Attendance: 0 Referee: Usha; Player of the Match: Asem Roja Devi (Kickstart)

20 April 2022	Mata Rukmani Girls	0–1	Odisha Police	Bhubaneswar
15:30		Report	Jasmani Samad 84'	Stadium: 7th Battalion Ground; Attendance: 0 Referee: Snigdha Mondal; Player of the Match: Jasmani Samad (Odisha Police)

20 April 2022	Sethu	3–0	ARA	Bhubaneswar
19:30	Sandhiya Ranganathan 50'; Renu Gour 59'; Poonam 64' (o.g.)	Report		Stadium: Kalinga Stadium; Attendance: 0 Referee: Jyotirmoy Nag; Player of the Match: Sandhiya Ranganathan {Sethu}

=== Round 3 ===
23 April 2022	Hans Women	0–9	Gokulam Kerala	Bhubaneswar
15:30		Report	Grace Dangmei 1'; Loitongbam Ashalata Devi 18'; Manisha Kalyan 21', 29'; Elshaddai Acheampong 45+1', 48'; Samiksha 46'; Win Theingi Tun 67'; Jyoti Chouhan 90+3'	Stadium: Capital Ground; Attendance: 0 Referee: Kusum Mandi; Player of the Match: Loitongbam Ashalata Devi (Gokulam Kerala)

23 April 2022	PIFA Sports	0–0	Sirvodem	Bhubaneswar
15:30		Report		Stadium: 7th Battalion Ground; Attendance: 0 Referee: Monika Jana; Player of the Match: Afshan Ashiq (Sirvodem)

23 April 2022	Kickstart	1–0	Sports Odisha	Bhubaneswar
19:30	Asem Roja Devi 90'	Report		Stadium: Kalinga Stadium; Attendance: 0 Referee: Phurki Lhamu Bhutia; Player of the Match: Asem Roja Devi (Kickstart)

24 April 2022	SSB Women	7–1	Mata Rukmani Girls	Bhubaneswar
15:30	Sandhya Kachhap 18', 63'; Naorem Sumila Chanu 49', 51', 74'; Ngangom Anibala Devi 33'; Purnima Linda 43'	Report	Kiran Pisda 60'	Stadium: Capital Ground; Attendance: 0 Referee: Ranjita Devi Tekcham; Player of the Match: Naorem Sumila Chanu (SSB Women)

24 April 2022	Odisha Police	1–3	ARA	Bhubaneswar
15:30	Suman Pragyna Mohapatra 81'	Report	Poonam 80'; Kiran 83'; Madhubala Alawe 90+3'	Stadium: 7th Battalion Ground; Attendance: 0 Referee: Ruba Devi G. Player of the Match: Kiran (ARA)

24 April 2022	Indian Arrows	0–3	Sethu	Bhubaneswar
19:30		Report	Sandhiya Ranganathan 17', 48'; Karthika Angamuthu 53' (pen.)	Stadium: Kalinga Stadium; Attendance: 0 Referee: Kanika Barman; Player of the Match: Sandhiya Ranganathan (Sethu)

=== Round 4 ===
27 April 2022	Odisha Police	0–4	Indian Arrows	Bhubaneswar
15:30		Report	Apurna Narzary 13', 19', 76'; Sunita Munda 36'	Stadium: Capital Ground; Attendance: 0 Referee: Jyotirmoy Nag; Player of the Match: Apurna Narzary (Indian Arrows)

27 April 2022	Sports Odisha	9–1	Sirvodem	Bhubaneswar
15:30	Satyabati Khadia 2', 14'; Pyari Xaxa 28', 58', 90+4'; Jabamani Tudu 37'; Jasoda Munda 59', 63'; Deepa Nayak 61'	Report	Ernestina Tetteh 53'	Stadium: 7th Battalion Ground; Attendance: 0 Referee: Rohit; Player of the Match: Pyari Xaxa (Sports Odisha)

27 April 2022	Mata Rukmani Girls	3–2	Hans Women	Bhubaneswar
19:30	Ningombam Sana Chanu 43' (o.g.); Reet Kashyap 65'; Priyanka Kashyap 78'	Report	Jyoti Ann Burrett 53'; Lakshmi Verma 84'	Stadium: Kalinga Stadium; Attendance: 0 Referee: Manjeet Singh; Player of the Match: Reet Kashyap (Mata Rukmani Girls)

28 April 2022	Sethu	2–1	Kickstart	Bhubaneswar
19:30	Kioko Elizabeth Katungwa 6', 45'	Report	Kshetrimayum Margaret Devi 45+2'	Stadium: Capital Ground; Attendance: 0 Referee: Usha; Player of the Match: Kioko Elizabeth Katungwa (Sethu)

28 April 2022	ARA	2–3	SSB Women	Bhubaneswar
15:30	Kiran 5'; Poonam 81'	Report	Dular Marandi 7', 43'; Naorem Sumila Chanu 26'	Stadium: 7th Battalion Ground; Attendance: 0 Referee: N Kurumaiah; Player of the Match: Dular Marandi (SSB Women)

28 April 2022	Gokulam Kerala	6–1	PIFA Sports	Bhubaneswar
19:30	Win Theingi Tun 27', 45+2'; Manisha Kalyan 43', 62'; Karishma Shirvoikar 49'; Nongmaithem Ratanbala Devi 83'	Report	Nisilia Majaw 60'	Stadium: Kalinga Stadium; Attendance: 0 Referee: Snigdha Mondal; Player of the Match: Karishma Shirvoikar (Gokulam Kerala)

=== Round 5 ===
1 May 2022	Gokulam Kerala	8–0	Mata Rukmani Girls	Bhubaneswar
15:30	Manisha Kalyan 3'; Soumya Guguloth 17', 38'; Elshaddai Acheampong 19', 25', 28'; Manasa K 66'; Jyoti Chouhan 85'	Report		Stadium: Capital Ground; Attendance: 0 Referee: Chitrambada Patra; Player of the Match: Elshaddai Acheampong (Gokulam Kerala)

1 May 2022	SSB Women	0–2	Indian Arrows	Bhubaneswar
15:30		Report	Sunita Munda 51'; Apurna Narzary 56'	Stadium: 7th Battalion Ground; Attendance: 0 Referee: Ruba Devi G. Player of the Match: Apurna Narzary (Indian Arrows)

1 May 2022	PIFA Sports	0–3	Sports Odisha	Bhubaneswar
19:30		Report	Jasoda Munda 15'; Subhadra Sahoo 61', 66'	Stadium: Kalinga Stadium; Attendance: 0 Referee: Ranjita Devi Tekcham; Player of the Match: Subhadra Sahoo (Sports Odisha)

2 May 2022	Hans Women	0–3	ARA	Bhubaneswar
19:30		Report	Manisha 10', 89'; Nisha 58'	Stadium: Capital Ground; Attendance: 0 Referee: Kanika Barman; Player of the Match: Manisha (ARA)

2 May 2022	Kickstart	2–0	Odisha Police	Bhubaneswar
15:30	Irom Prameshwori Devi 53'; Yangoijam Kiranbala Chanu 55'	Report		Stadium: 7th Battalion Ground; Attendance: 0 Referee: Monika Jana; Player of the Match: Rajeswari Das (Odisha Police)

2 May 2022	Sirvodem	0–5	Sethu	Bhubaneswar
19:30		Report	Renu Gour 16', 22'; Devneta Roy 66', 80'; Durga A 90+1'	Stadium: Kalinga Stadium; Attendance: 0 Referee: Kusum Mandi; Player of the Match: Renu Rani (Sethu)

=== Round 6 ===
5 May 2022	Sethu	4–0	Sports Odisha	Bhubaneswar
15:30	Kioko Elizabeth Katungwa 5'; Karthika Angamuthu 6'; Durga A 9', 30'	Report		Stadium: Capital Ground; Attendance: 0 Referee: Kanika Barman; Player of the Match: Durga A (Sethu)

5 May 2022	Mata Rukmani Girls	1–3	PIFA Sports	Bhubaneswar
15:30	Priyanka Kashyap 35'	Report	Karen Pais 24' (pen.), 54'; Lalnunsiami 61'	Stadium: 7th Battalion Ground; Attendance: 0 Referee: Jyotirmoy Nag; Player of the Match: Karen Pais (PIFA Sports)

5 May 2022	ARA	0–8	Gokulam Kerala	Bhubaneswar
19:30		Report	Manisha Kalyan 8'; Grace Dangmei 31'; Soumya Guguloth 49'; Win Theingi Tun 66'; Elshaddai Acheampong 71', 78', 90+3'; Jyoti Chouhan 83'	Stadium: Kalinga Stadium; Attendance: 0 Referee: Phurki Lhamu Bhutia; Player of the Match: Elshaddai Acheampong (Gokulam Kerala)

6 May 2022	Odisha Police	2–1	Sirvodem	Bhubaneswar
19:30	Sarojini Tirkey 18'; Shibani Mundari 76'	Report	Femina Raj Valappil 82'	Stadium: Capital Ground; Attendance: 0 Referee: Usha; Player of the Match: Sarojini Tirkey (Odisha Police)

6 May 2022	Indian Arrows	2–0	Hans Women	Bhubaneswar
15:30	Apurna Narzary 10'; Naorem Priyangka Devi 23'	Report		Stadium: 7th Battalion Ground; Attendance: 0 Referee: Monika Jana; Player of the Match: Sunita Munda (Indian Arrows)

6 May 2022	SSB Women	0–1	Kickstart	Bhubaneswar
19:30		Report	Irom Prameshwori Devi 35'	Stadium: Kalinga Stadium; Attendance: 0 Referee: Rohit; Player of the Match: Ngangbam Sweety Devi (Kickstart)

=== Round 7 ===
8 May 2022	Mata Rukmani Girls	0–4	ARA	Bhubaneswar
15:30		Report	Kiran 17'; Madhubala Alawe 45+3'; Manisha 59'; Anju 80'	Stadium: Capital Ground; Attendance: 0 Referee: Snigdha Mondal; Player of the Match: Kiran (ARA)

8 May 2022	PIFA Sports	1–4	Sethu	Bhubaneswar
15:30	Nisilia Majaw 34'	Report	Anju Tamang 12'; Durga A 18'; Renu Gour 21' (pen.); Sandhiya Ranganathan 90+2'	Stadium: 7th Battalion Ground; Attendance: 0 Referee: Rohit; Player of the Match: Anju Tamang (Sethu)

8 May 2022	Sports Odisha	4–1	Odisha Police	Bhubaneswar
19:30	Sumitra Hembram 15'; Satyabati Khadia 17'; Pyari Xaxa 47'; Subhadra Sahoo 58'	Report	Sumitra Xalxo 12'	Stadium: Kalinga Stadium; Attendance: 0 Referee: Ruba Devi G. Player of the Match: Pyari Xaxa (Sports Odisha)

9 May 2022	Gokulam Kerala	2–1	Indian Arrows	Bhubaneswar
15:30	Elshaddai Acheampong 36', 47'	Report	Naorem Priyangka Devi 6'	Stadium: Capital Ground; Attendance: 0 Referee: Ranjita Devi Tekcham; Player of the Match: Elshaddai Acheampong (Gokulam Kerala)

9 May 2022	Sirvodem	2–1	SSB Women	Bhubaneswar
15:30	Sanfida Nongrum 32'; Arpita Pednekar 62'	Report	Sandhya Kachhap 60'	Stadium: 7th Battalion Ground; Attendance: 0 Referee: Chitrambada Patra; Player of the Match: Arpita Pednekar (Sirvodem)

9 May 2022	Hans Women	0–4	Kickstart	Bhubaneswar
19:30		Report	Asem Roja Devi 7'; Thingbaijam Babysana Devi 49'; Yangoijam Kiranbala Chanu 56'; Vunglawmching 61'	Stadium: Kalinga Stadium; Attendance: 0 Referee: Kusum Mandi; Player of the Match: Asem Roja Devi (Kickstart)

=== Round 8 ===
13 May 2022	ARA	1–1	PIFA Sports	Bhubaneswar
15:30	Anju 15'	Report	Akanksha Kandalkar 73'	Stadium: Capital Ground; Attendance: 0 Referee: Monika Jana; Player of the Match: Manisha (ARA)

13 May 2022	Odisha Police	0–3	Sethu	Bhubaneswar
15:30		Report	Sandhiya Ranganathan 27'; Devneta Roy 33'; Renu Gour 67'	Stadium: 7th Battalion; Attendance: 0 Referee: Kanika Barman; Player of the Match: Anju Tamang (Sethu)

13 May 2022	Indian Arrows	8–0	Mata Rukmani Girls	Bhubaneswar
19:30	Apurna Narzary 11', 66'; Naorem Priyangka Devi 25', 42', 49', 61'; Sunita Munda 47', 62'	Report		Stadium: Kalinga Stadium; Attendance: 0 Referee: Jyotirmoy Nag; Player of the Match: Naorem Priyangka Devi (Indian Arrows)

14 May 2022	Kickstart	0–5	Gokulam Kerala	Bhubaneswar
15:30		Report	Elshaddai Acheampong 7'; Loitongbam Ashalata Devi 12' (pen.); Nongmaithem Ratanbala Devi 60'; Manisha Kalyan 80'; Karishma Shirvoikar 90+2'	Stadium: Capital Ground; Attendance: 0 Referee: Ruba Devi G Player of the Match: Manisha Kalyan (Gokulam Kerala)

14 May 2022	SSB Women	1–1	Sports Odisha	Bhubaneswar
15:30	Sandhya Kachhap 41'	Report	Pyari Xaxa 89'	Stadium: 7th Battalion; Attendance: 0 Referee: Usha; Player of the Match: Pyari Xaxa (Sports Odisha)

14 May 2022	Hans Women	0–4	Sirvodem	Bhubaneswar
19:30		Report	Aleena Tony 22'; Jyoti 33'; Sharda 45+2'; Sanfida Nongrum 45+4'	Stadium: Kalinga Stadium; Attendance: 0 Referee: Phurki Lhamu Bhutia; Player of the Match: Sanfida Nongrum (Sirvodem)

=== Round 9 ===
17 May 2022	ARA	1–3	Indian Arrows	Bhubaneswar
15:30	Naketa 90'	Report	Muskan Subba 45+3'; Apurna Narzary 75'; Naorem Priyangka Devi 90+4'	Stadium: Capital Ground; Attendance: 0 Referee: Chitrambada Patra; Player of the Match: Santosh (Indian Arrows)

17 May 2022	Gokulam Kerala	4–0	Sirvodem	Bhubaneswar
15:30	Elshaddai Acheampong 6'; Soumya Guguloth 15', 52'; Grace Dangmei 31'	Report		Stadium: 7th Battalion; Attendance: 0 Referee: Snigdha Mondal; Player of the Match: Soumya Guguloth (Gokulam Kerala)

17 May 2022	Sethu	6–0	SSB Women	Bhubaneswar
19:30	Kioko Katungwa 9', 87'; Sandhiya Ranganathan 13'; Grace Hauhnar 38'; Renu Gour 45'; Anju Tamang 82'	Report		Stadium: Kalinga Stadium; Attendance: 0 Referee: Ranjita Devi Tekcham; Player of the Match: Anju Tamang (Sethu)

18 May 2022	Mata Rukmani Girls	0–10	Kickstart	Bhubaneswar
15:30		Report	Yangoijam Kiranbala Chanu 12', 14', 45+2', 87'; Asem Roja Devi 15', 37'; Thingbaijam Babysana Devi 42', 50'; Pakpi Devi Yumlembam 85'; Laishram Bibicha Devi 90+1'	Stadium: Capital Ground; Attendance: 0 Referee: Rohit; Player of the Match: Yangoijam Kiranbala Chanu (Kickstart)

18 May 2022	Sports Odisha	6–0	Hans Women	Bhubaneswar
15:30	Anita 21' (o.g.); Subhadra Sahoo 39'; Supriya Routray 53', 68', 82'; Pyari Xaxa 67'	Report		Stadium: 7th Battalion; Attendance: 0 Referee: Ruba Devi G Player of the Match: Supriya Routray (Sports Odisha)

18 May 2022	PIFA Sports	1–0	Odisha Police	Bhubaneswar
19:30	Nisilia Majaw 64'	Report		Stadium: Kalinga Stadium; Attendance: 0 Referee: Jyotirmoy Nag; Player of the Match: Karen Pais (PIFA Sports)

=== Round 10 ===
21 May 2022	SSB Women	5–2	Odisha Police	Bhubaneswar
08:30	Dular Marandi 27', 38', 57', 58'; Naorem Sumila Chanu 45+1'	Report	Suman Pragyna Mohapatra 6'; Lochana Munda 90+7'	Stadium: Capital Ground; Attendance: 0 Referee: Ruba Devi G Player of the Match: Dular Marandi (SSB Women)

21 May 2022	Indian Arrows	1–2	PIFA Sports	Bhubaneswar
15:30	Sunita Munda 48'	Report	Akanksha Kandalkar 25'; Iawanlang Nongbet 39'	Stadium: Capital Ground; Attendance: 0 Referee: Kanika Barman; Player of the Match: Iawanlang Nongbet (PIFA Sports)

21 May 2022	Kickstart	3–0	ARA	Bhubaneswar
15:30	Pakpi Devi Yumlembam 47', 65'; Thingbaijam Babysana Devi 75'	Report		Stadium: 7th Battalion; Attendance: 0 Referee: Monika Jana; Player of the Match: Yumlembam Pakpi Devi (Kickstart)

22 May 2022	Gokulam Kerala	7–1	Sports Odisha	Bhubaneswar
08:30	Elshaddai Acheampong 5', 23', 78', 87'; Manisha Kalyan 45+2'; Soumya Guguloth 64', 68'	Report	Pyari Xaxa 24'	Stadium: Capital Ground; Attendance: 0 Referee: Usha; Player of the Match: Soumya Guguloth (Gokulam Kerala)

22 May 2022	Hans Women	0–5	Sethu	Bhubaneswar
15:30		Report	Devneta Roy 2', 16'; Sandhiya Ranganathan 39'; N Lavanya 72'; Elizabeth Vanlalmawii 88'	Stadium: Capital Ground; Attendance: 0 Referee: Phurki Lhamu Bhutia; Player of the Match: Devneta Roy (Sethu)

22 May 2022	Sirvodem	4–1	Mata Rukmani Girls	Bhubaneswar
15:30	Sanfida Nongrum 38'; Jyoti 55', 63'; Aleena Tony 57'	Report	Kiran Pisda 10'	Stadium: 7th Battalion; Attendance: 0 Referee: Chitrambada Patra; Player of the Match: Jyoti (Sirvodem)

=== Round 11 ===
25 May 2022	Odisha Police	2–3	Hans Women	Bhubaneswar
08:30	Shibani Mundari 45+1' (pen.); Karishma Oram 70'	Report	Vaani Kalucha 4'; Jyoti Ann Burrett 89', 90+2'	Stadium: Capital Ground; Attendance: 0 Referee: Monika Jana; Player of the Match: Jyoti Ann Burrett (Hans Women)

25 May 2022	ARA	3–1	Sirvodem	Bhubaneswar
15:30	Kiran 55', 89'; Madhubala Alawe 88'	Report	Jyoti 12'	Stadium: Capital Ground; Attendance: 0 Referee: Ranjita Devi Tekcham; Player of the Match: Kiran (ARA)

25 May 2022	PIFA Sports	1–6	SSB Women	Bhubaneswar
15:30	Nisilia Majaw 75'	Report	Huidrom Ranjita Devi 13', 28', 59'; Naorem Sumila Chanu 45+4', 54'; Monika 80'	Stadium: 7th Battalion; Attendance: 0 Referee: Rohit; Player of the Match: Huidrom Ranjita Devi (SSB Women)

26 May 2022	Mata Rukmani Girls	0–7	Sports Odisha	Bhubaneswar
08:30		Report	Deepa Nayak 43', 45+1', 64', 90+4'; Pyari Xaxa 45+2', 51', 86'	Stadium: 7th Battalion; Attendance: 0 Referee: Snigdha Mondal; Player of the Match: Deepa Nayak (Sports Odisha)

26 May 2022	Indian Arrows	0–1	Kickstart	Bhubaneswar
15:30		Report	Kshetrimayum Margaret Devi 44'	Stadium: Capital Ground; Attendance: 0 Referee: Jyotirmoy Nag; Player of the Match: Kshetrimayum Margaret Devi (Kickstart)

26 May 2022	Sethu	1–3	Gokulam Kerala	Bhubaneswar
19:30	Renu Rani	Report	Loitongbam Ashalata Devi 14' (pen.); Elshaddai Acheampong 33'; Manisha Kalyan 40'	Stadium: Kalinga Stadium; Attendance: 100; Referee: Kanika Barman; Player of the Match: Grace Dangmei (Gokulam Kerala)

== Season statistics ==
=== Top scorers ===
Rank	Player	Club	Goals
1	(Ghana) Elshaddai Acheampong	Gokulam Kerala	20
2	(India) Manisha Kalyan	Gokulam Kerala	14
3	(India) Pyari Xaxa	Sports Odisha	12
4	(India) Apurna Narzary	Indian Arrows	9
4	(India) Naorem Priyangka Devi	Indian Arrows	9
4	(India) Dular Marandi	SSB	9
7	(India) Renu Gour	Sethu	8
Source: AIFF

=== Most clean sheets ===
Note: Only the top 5 goalkeepers with most clean sheets have been listed below.

Rank	Player	Club	Clean sheets
1	(India) Maibam Linthoingambi Devi	Kickstart	8
2	(India) Aditi Chauhan	Gokulam Kerala	7
3	(India) Devi D	Sethu	7
4	(India) Adrija Sarkhel	Indian Arrows	6
5	(India) Sasmita Parida	Sports Odisha	4

== Awards ==
=== Match awards ===
Note: Player of the match awarded only for the matches played in the regular season, and not in the qualifier.

Hero of the Match
Match No.	Player	Club	Match No.	Player	Club	Match No.	Player	Club
Match 1	(India) Irom Prameshwori Devi	Kickstart	Match 23	(India) Dular Marandi	SSB	Match 45	(India) Naorem Priyangka Devi	Indian Arrows
Match 2	(India) Dular Marandi	SSB	Match 24	(India) Karishma Shirvoikar	Gokulam Kerala	Match 46	(India) Manisha Kalyan	Gokulam Kerala
Match 3	(India) Naorem Priyangka Devi	Indian Arrows	Match 25	(Ghana) Elshaddai Acheampong	Gokulam Kerala	Match 47	(India) Pyari Xaxa	Sports Odisha
Match 4	(India) Manisha Kalyan	Gokulam Kerala	Match 26	(India) Apurna Narzary	Indian Arrows	Match 48	(India) Sanfida Nongrum	Sirvodem
Match 5	(India) Sanju Yadav	Sethu	Match 27	(India) Subhadra Sahoo	Sports Odisha	Match 49	(India) Soumya Guguloth	Gokulam Kerala
Match 6	(India) Pyari Xaxa	Sports Odisha	Match 28	(India) Rajeswari Das	Odisha Police	Match 50	(India) Santosh	Indian Arrows
Match 7	(India) Nisilia Majaw	PIFA Sports	Match 29	(India) Manisha	ARA	Match 51	(India) Anju Tamang	Sethu
Match 8	(India) Sasmita Parida	Sports Odisha	Match 30	(India) Renu Gour	Sethu	Match 52	(India) Yangoijam Kiranbala Chanu	Kickstart
Match 9	(India) Manju	SSB	Match 31	(India) Durga A	Sethu	Match 53	(India) Supriya Routray	Sports Odisha
Match 10	(India) Asem Roja Devi	Kickstart	Match 32	(India) Karen Pais	PIFA Sports	Match 54	(India) Karen Pais	PIFA Sports
Match 11	(India) Jasmani Samad	Odisha Police	Match 33	(Ghana) Elshaddai Acheampong	Gokulam Kerala	Match 55	(India) Dular Marandi	SSB
Match 12	(India) Sandhiya Ranganathan	Sethu	Match 34	(India) Sarojini Tirkey	Odisha Police	Match 56	(India) Pakpi Devi Yumlembam	Kickstart
Match 13	(India) Loitongbam Ashalata Devi	Gokulam Kerala	Match 35	(India) Sunita Munda	Indian Arrows	Match 57	(India) Iawanlang Nongbet	PIFA Sports
Match 14	(India) Afshan Ashiq	Sirvodem	Match 36	(India) Ngangbam Sweety Devi	Kickstart	Match 58	(India) Soumya Guguloth	Gokulam Kerala
Match 15	(India) Asem Roja Devi	Kickstart	Match 37	(India) Kiran	ARA	Match 59	(India) Devneta Roy	Sethu
Match 16	(India) Naorem Sumila Chanu	SSB	Match 38	(India) Anju Tamang	Sethu	Match 60	(India) Jyoti	Sirvodem
Match 17	(India) Kiran	ARA	Match 39	(India) Pyari Xaxa	Sports Odisha	Match 61	(India) Jyoti Ann Burrett	Hans Women
Match 18	(India) Sandhiya Ranganathan	Sethu	Match 40	(India) Asem Roja Devi	Kickstart	Match 62	(India) Huidrom Ranjita Devi	SSB
Match 19	(India) Apurna Narzary	Indian Arrows	Match 41	(Ghana) Elshaddai Acheampong	Gokulam Kerala	Match 63	(India) Kiran	ARA
Match 20	(India) Pyari Xaxa	Sports Odisha	Match 42	(India) Arpita Yeshwant Pednekar	Sirvodem	Match 64	(India) Deepa Nayak	Sports Odisha
Match 21	(India) Reet Kashyap	Mata Rukmani Girls	Match 43	(India) Anju Tamang	Sethu	Match 65	(India) Kshetrimayum Margaret Devi	Kickstart
Match 22	(Kenya) Elizabeth Kioko Katungwa	Sethu	Match 44	(India) Manisha	ARA	Match 66	(India) Grace Dangmei	Gokulam Kerala

=== Season awards ===
Award	Winner
Hero of the League	(India) Manisha Kalyan (Gokulam Kerala)
Top Goalscorer	(Ghana) Elshaddai Acheampong (Gokulam Kerala)
Best Goalkeeper	(India) Maibam Linthoingambi Devi (Kickstart)
Best Defender	(India) Loitongbam Ashalata Devi (Gokulam Kerala)
Emerging Player of the League	(India) Naorem Priyangka Devi (Indian Arrows)
