= 2021 International Women's Football Tournament of Manaus squads =

The 2021 International Women's Football Tournament of Manaus (also known as the 2021 Torneio Internacional de Manaus de Futebol Feminino) was an invitational football tournament held in Brazil. The 2021 tournament was played from November 25 to December 1, 2021.

Tournament rules allow a 23-member roster. Players marked (c) were named as captain for their national squad. Totals for caps and goals, club affiliations, and ages are as of the opening day of the tournament on 25 November 2021.

== Squads ==
=== Brazil ===
Coach: (Sweden) Pia Sundhage

Érika (Corinthians) and Thaís (Palmeiras) were replaced by Gabi Nunes and Ivana Fuso, respectively. The following 24 players were called up for the tournament.

No.	Pos.	Player	Date of birth (age)	Caps	Goals	Club
1	GK	Lorena	6 May 1997 (aged 24)	0	0	(Brazil) Grêmio
22	GK	Letícia Izidoro	13 August 1994 (aged 27)	66	0	(Portugal) Benfica
2	DF	Bruninha	16 June 2002 (aged 19)	0	0	(Brazil) Santos
3	DF	Daiane	7 September 1997 (aged 24)	7	0	(Spain) Madrid CFF
4	DF	Antônia	26 April 1994 (aged 27)	3	0	(Spain) Madrid CFF
6	DF	Tamires	10 October 1987 (aged 34)	91	5	(Brazil) Corinthians
15	DF	Tainara	21 April 1999 (aged 22)	0	0	(Brazil) Palmeiras
19	DF	Yasmim	28 October 1996 (aged 25)	0	0	(Brazil) Corinthians
25	DF	Lauren	13 September 2002 (aged 19)	0	0	(Brazil) São Paulo
5	MF	Julia Bianchi	7 October 1997 (aged 24)	5	2	(Brazil) Palmeiras
8	MF	Formiga	3 March 1978 (aged 43)	196	67	(Brazil) São Paulo
10	MF	Marta (captain)	19 February 1986 (aged 35)	151	107	(United States) Orlando Pride
11	MF	Adriana	17 November 1996 (aged 25)	12	0	(Brazil) Corinthians
13	MF	Ivana Fuso	12 March 2001 (aged 20)	0	0	(England) Manchester United
16	MF	Ana Vitória	6 March 2000 (aged 21)	1	0	(Portugal) Benfica
18	MF	Katrine	19 April 1998 (aged 23)	0	0	(Brazil) Palmeiras
24	MF	Angelina	26 January 2000 (aged 21)	0	0	(United States) OL Reign
7	FW	Duda	18 July 1995 (aged 26)	3	1	(Brazil) São Paulo
9	FW	Debinha	20 October 1991 (aged 30)	87	33	(United States) North Carolina Courage
14	FW	Gio Queiroz	21 June 2003 (aged 18)	2	0	(Spain) Levante
17	FW	Ary Borges	28 December 1999 (aged 21)	0	0	(Brazil) Palmeiras
20	FW	Gabi Nunes	10 March 1997 (aged 24)	11	1	(Spain) Madrid CFF
21	FW	Kerolin	17 November 1999 (aged 22)	2	0	(Spain) Madrid CFF
23	FW	Geyse	27 March 1998 (aged 23)	33	16	(Spain) Madrid CFF

=== Chile ===
Coach: (Chile) José Letelier

The following 22 players were called up for the tournament.

No.	Pos.	Player	Date of birth (age)	Caps	Goals	Club
1	GK	Christiane Endler (captain)	23 July 1991 (aged 30)	84	0	(France) Olympique Lyonnais
12	GK	Natalia Campos	12 January 1992 (aged 29)	10	0	Universidad de Chile
23	GK	Antonia Canales	16 October 2002 (aged 19)	0	0	(Chile) Universidad Católica
2	DF	Nicole Cornejo	19 June 1993 (aged 28)	2	0	(Chile) Palestino
5	DF	Fernanda Ramírez	30 August 1992 (aged 29)	1	0	Universidad de Chile
13	DF	Nicole Gutiérrez	30 March 1996 (aged 25)	0	0	(Chile) Colo-Colo
16	DF	Geraldine Leyton	11 May 1989 (aged 32)	34	1	(Chile) Santiago Morning
17	DF	Javiera Toro	22 April 1998 (aged 23)	18	0	(Spain) Sevilla
18	DF	Camila Sáez	17 October 1994 (aged 27)	66	8	(Spain) Rayo Vallecano
21	DF	Rosario Balmaceda	23 March 1999 (aged 22)	20	0	(Chile) Santiago Morning
4	MF	Francisca Lara	29 July 1990 (aged 31)	75	21	(Spain) Villarreal
6	MF	Nayadet López	5 August 1994 (aged 27)	8	0	(Spain) Espanyol
8	MF	Karen Araya	16 October 1990 (aged 31)	69	10	(Chile) Santiago Morning
10	MF	Yanara Aedo	5 August 1993 (aged 28)	74	12	(Spain) Rayo Vallecano
11	MF	Tali Rovner	29 June 2005 (aged 16)	0	0	(Chile) Universidad Católica
15	MF	María Cristina Julio	17 November 1999 (aged 22)	4	0	(Chile) Deportes La Serena
20	MF	Yastin Jiménez	17 October 2000 (aged 21)	2	0	(Chile) Colo-Colo
7	FW	Yenny Acuña	24 March 2000 (aged 21)	6	0	(Chile) Santiago Morning
9	FW	María José Urrutia	17 December 1993 (aged 27)	28	2	(Chile) Colo-Colo
14	FW	María José Rojas	17 December 1987 (aged 33)	43	11	(Australia) Sydney FC
19	FW	Javiera Grez	23 April 2002 (aged 19)	16	2	(Chile) Colo-Colo
22	FW	Isidora Hernández	22 August 1996 (aged 25)	0	0	(Chile) Santiago Morning

=== India ===
Coach: (Sweden) Thomas Dennerby

The following 23 players were called up for the tournament.

No.	Pos.	Player	Date of birth (age)	Caps	Goals	Club
1	GK	Aditi Chauhan	20 November 1992 (aged 29)	27	0	(India) Gokulam Kerala
19	GK	Maibam Linthoingambi Devi	2 February 1999 (aged 22)	6	0	(India) KRYPHSA
20	GK	Sowmiya Narayansamy	25 July 2000 (aged 21)	1	0	(India) Sethu
2	DF	Ngangbam Sweety Devi	1 December 1999 (aged 21)	20	2	(India) KRYPHSA
3	DF	Manisa Panna	20 April 1991 (aged 30)	19	1	(India) Gokulam Kerala
4	DF	Loitongbam Ashalata Devi (captain)	3 July 1993 (aged 28)	54	6	(India) Sethu
5	DF	Wangkhem Linthoingambi Devi	1 March 1995 (aged 26)	2	0	(India) KRYPHSA
14	DF	Sorokhaibam Ranjana Chanu	10 March 1999 (aged 22)	11	3	(India) Gokulam Kerala
17	DF	Dalima Chhibber	30 August 1997 (aged 24)	42	2	(India) Gokulam Kerala
22	DF	Ritu Rani	25 May 1997 (aged 24)	3	0	(India) Gokulam Kerala
28	DF	Hemam Shilky Devi	23 November 2005 (aged 16)	1	0	(India) Young Welfare
7	MF	Yumnam Kamala Devi	4 March 1992 (aged 29)	35	30	(India) Gokulam Kerala
8	MF	Sanju Yadav	12 September 1997 (aged 24)	32	11	(India) Railways football team (women)
9	MF	Anju Tamang	22 December 1995 (aged 25)	18	5	(India) KRYPHSA
12	MF	Indumathi Kathiresan	5 June 1994 (aged 27)	41	15	(India) Tamil Nadu Police (women)
13	MF	Martina Thokchom	13 July 2004 (aged 17)	4	0	(India) KRYPHSA
23	MF	Karthika Angamuthu	21 November 1999 (aged 22)	0	0	(India) Sethu
10	FW	Pyari Xaxa	18 May 1997 (aged 24)	18	6	(India) Rising Student Club
11	FW	Grace Dangmei	5 February 1996 (aged 25)	45	17	(India) Gokulam Kerala
15	FW	Renu	16 January 2001 (aged 20)	6	1	(India) Haryana football team (women)
16	FW	Manisha Kalyan	27 November 2001 (aged 19)	9	6	(India) Gokulam Kerala
18	FW	Mariyammal Balamurugan	14 April 2003 (aged 18)	1	0	(India) Sethu
27	FW	Soumya Guguloth	18 July 2001 (aged 20)	6	0	(India) Gokulam Kerala

=== Venezuela ===
Coach: (Italy) Vincenzo Conti

The coach (Italy) Pamela Conti tested positive for COVID-19 and was replaced by her brother, the assistant coach Vincenzo Conti. The following 23 players were called up for the tournament.

No.	Pos.	Player	Date of birth (age)	Club
1	GK	Yessica Velásquez	28 July 1989 (aged 32)	(Colombia) Santa Fe
13	GK	Nayluisa Cáceres	18 November 1999 (aged 22)	(Spain) Granadilla Tenerife
22	GK	Andrea Fernanda Tovar	22 August 1990 (aged 31)	(Spain) Getafe Femenino
2	DF	Nairelis Gutiérrez	2 July 1995 (aged 26)	(Colombia) Santa Fe
3	DF	Hilary Vergara	20 August 1999 (aged 22)	(Brazil) Atlético Mineiro
4	DF	Petra Cabrera	19 May 1990 (aged 31)	(Brazil) Real Brasília
5	DF	Yenifer Giménez	5 November 1996 (aged 25)	(Spain) Villarreal
23	DF	Gabriela Angulo	27 February 2004 (aged 17)	(Venezuela) Yaracuyanos
7	MF	Paola Villamizar	30 June 1994 (aged 27)	(Mexico) Tijuana
8	MF	Sonia O'Neill	18 August 1994 (aged 27)	(Croatia) ŽNK Split
10	MF	Kika Moreno (captain)	25 January 1997 (aged 24)	(Spain) Dux Logroño
14	MF	Daniuska Rodríguez	4 January 1999 (aged 22)	(Portugal) Torreense Feminino
17	MF	Maikerlin Astudillo	10 May 1992 (aged 29)	(Spain) AEM
20	MF	Dayana Rodríguez	20 October 2001 (aged 20)	(Brazil) Atlético Mineiro
6	FW	Mariana Speckmaier	26 December 1997 (aged 23)	(United States) Washington Spirit
9	FW	Deyna Castellanos	18 April 1999 (aged 22)	(Spain) Atlético Madrid
11	FW	Oriana Altuve	3 October 1992 (aged 29)	(Spain) Valencia
12	FW	Dubraska Rivera	28 April 1999 (aged 22)	(Venezuela) Yaracuyanos
15	FW	Kimberlyn Campos	29 October 2003 (aged 18)	(Venezuela) Escuela Secasports
16	FW	Gabriela García	2 April 1997 (aged 24)	(Spain) Real Sociedad
18	FW	Ysaura Viso	17 June 1993 (aged 28)	(Chile) Colo-Colo
19	FW	Joemar Guarecuco	20 June 1994 (aged 27)	(Colombia) Santa Fe
21	FW	Bárbara Olivieri	24 February 2002 (aged 19)	(United States) Texas A&M Aggies
