= List of Indian Women's League hat-tricks =

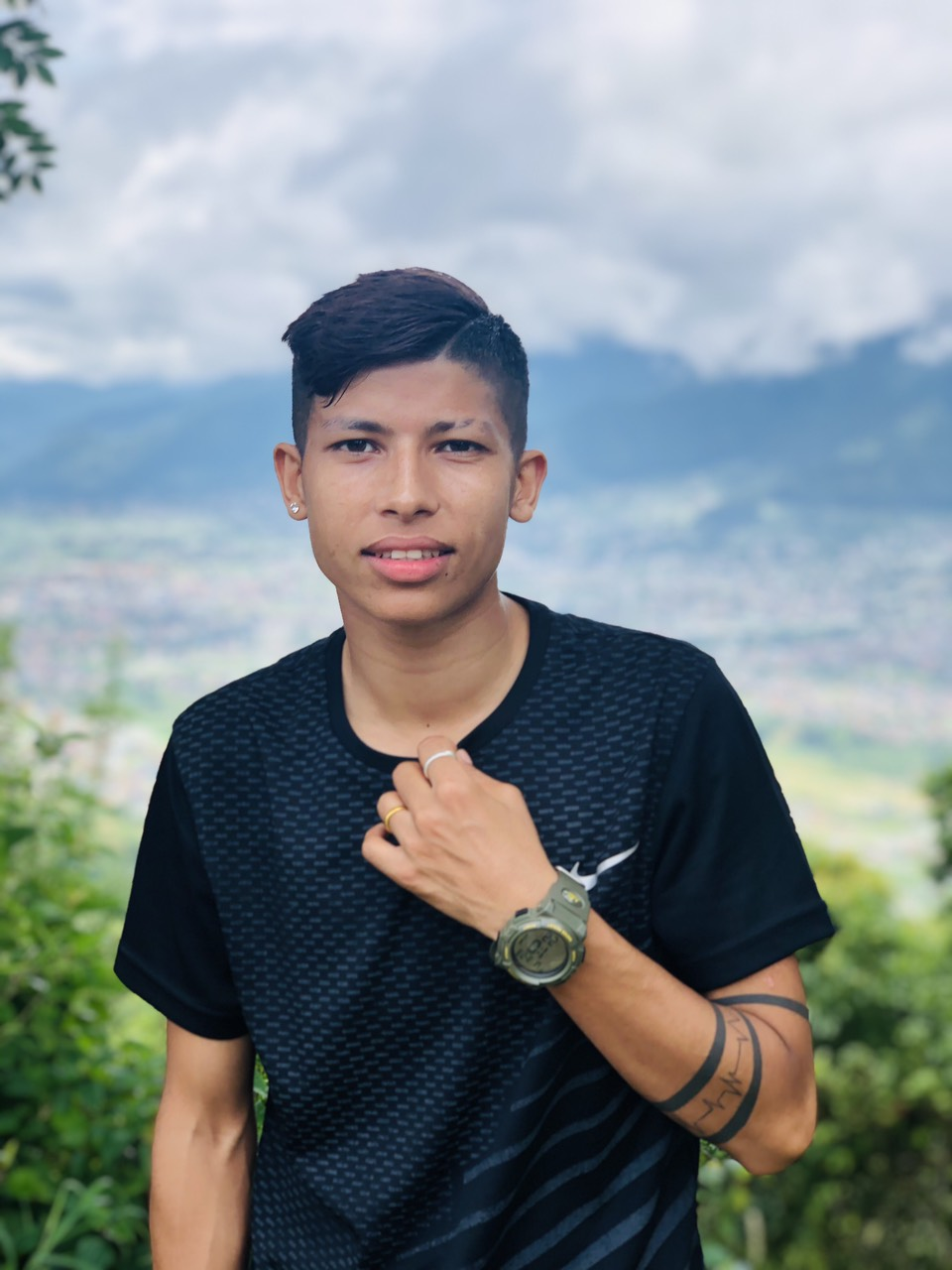
Sabitra Bhandari scored 10 hat-tricks, the most by any foreigner in IWL.

Since the inception of the women's football league competition in India, the Indian Women's League (IWL) in October 2016, 32 players have scored a hat-trick (3 goals or more in a single match). Until 16 April 2025, 75 hat-tricks were scored in the IWL. The first player to achieve the feat was Sasmita Mallik of India who scored three times for Rising Students in a 6–1 victory over Aizawl.

Sabitra Bhandari of Nepal scored the most number of hat-tricks as a foreigner in the history of IWL. She achieved the feat 10 times in three seasons. Bala Devi scored the most number of hat-tricks as an Indian in the history of IWL. She achieved the feat 10 times in five seasons. Bhandari, Devi and Apurna Narzary are the only players to score multiple hat-tricks in a single match, with Bala Devi having achieved this rare feat twice. She first achieved it while scoring seven goals for Manipur Police in a 10−0 victory over SAI-STC Cuttack and then achieved the feat again while scoring 6 goals for Manipur Police in a 10−0 victory over Bangalore United. She scored her first three goals at the 3rd, 15th and 16th minutes of the match, thus making her the fastest hat-trick scorer of IWL.

The first non-Indian player to have scored a hat-trick in the IWL was Fazila Ikwaput of Uganda. She scored the hat-trick for Gokulam Kerala in a 6–1 win against Indira Gandhi AS&E. Sabitra Bhandari, Elshaddai Acheampong and Fazila Ikwaput are the only non-Indian players to have scored multiple hat-tricks in the IWL. To date, players scored 23 hat-tricks for Gokulam Kerala, the most for a single club, whereas East Bengal and Mata Rukmani conceded six hat-tricks each, the most by any club.

== Hat-tricks ==
As of 27 April 2026
Result column shows goal tally of player's team first.

No.	Player	For	Against	Goals	Result	Date	Ref.
1	(India) Sasmita Mallik	Rising Students	Aizawl	3	6–1	28 January 2017	
2	(India) Kamala Devi Yumnam	Eastern Sporting Union	Jeppiaar Institute	3	7–1	28 January 2017	
3	(India) M. K. Kashmina	Eastern Sporting Union	Jeppiaar Institute	3	7–1	28 January 2017	
4	(India) Sanju Yadav	Alakhpura	Aizawl	3	6–2	31 January 2017	
5	(India) Jabamani Tudu	Rising Student	Jeppiaar Institute	4	7–0	8 February 2017	
6	(India) Kamala Devi Yumnam	Eastern Sporting Union	Alakhpura	3	4–1	11 February 2017	
7	(Uganda) Fazila Ikwaput	Gokulam Kerala	Indira Gandhi AS&E	5	6−1	31 March 2018	
8	(India) Ratanbala Devi Nongmaithem	KRYPHSA	Indira Gandhi AS&E	4	10−1	8 April 2018	
9	(India) Bala Devi Ngangom	KRYPHSA	Indira Gandhi AS&E	4	10−1	8 April 2018	
10	(India) Bala Devi Ngangom	KRYPHSA	Gokulam Kerala	4	5−0	10 April 2018	
11	(India) Manisha Kalyan	Gokulam Kerala	Rising Students	3	5−0	5 May 2019	
12	(Nepal) Sabitra Bhandari	Sethu	Manipur Police	4	6−4	6 May 2019	
13	(India) Bala Devi Ngangom	Manipur Police	SAI-ATC Cuttack	7	10−0	8 May 2019	
14	(India) Bala Devi Ngangom	Manipur Police	SAI-ATC Cuttack	7	10−0	8 May 2019	
15	(India) Bala Devi Ngangom	Manipur Police	Baroda	4	6−1	10 May 2019	
16	(India) Ratanbala Devi Nongmaithem	Sethu	SAI-ATC Cuttack	3	9−0	10 May 2019	
17	(India) Ratanbala Devi Nongmaithem	Sethu	Kohlapur City	3	9−0	12 May 2019	
18	(Nepal) Sabitra Bhandari	Sethu	Kohlapur City	3	9−0	12 May 2019	
19	(India) Bala Devi Ngangom	Manipur Police	Kohlapur City	3	7−1	14 May 2019	
20	(India) Sandhiya Ranganathan	Gokulam Kerala	Rising Students	4	7−0	18 May 2019	
21	(India) Bala Devi Ngangom	Manipur Police	Bangalore United	6	10−0	18 May 2019	
22	(India) Bala Devi Ngangom	Manipur Police	Bangalore United	6	10−0	18 May 2019	
23	(India) Bala Devi Ngangom	Manipur Police	Gokulam Kerala	4	4−2	20 May 2019	
24	(India) Grace Dangmei	Sethu	SSB Women	4	6−4	20 May 2019	
25	(Nepal) Sabitra Bhandari	Sethu	SSB Women	4	6−4	20 May 2019	
26	(India) Sandhiya Ranganathan	Sethu	Kohlapur City	3	5−0	24 January 2020	
27	(India) Soumya Guguloth	Kenkre	Odisha Police	3	4−1	25 January 2020	
28	(India) Karishma Shirvoikar	Gokulam Kerala	Kenkre	3	10−1	28 January 2020	
29	(Nepal) Sabitra Bhandari	Gokulam Kerala	Kenkre	5	10−1	28 January 2020	
30	(India) Sandhiya Ranganathan	Sethu	BBK DAV	4	9−0	30 January 2020	
31	(Nepal) Sabitra Bhandari	Gokulam Kerala	Odisha Police	5	7−0	1 February 2020	
32	(India) Kamala Devi Yumnam	Gokulam Kerala	Bangalore United	3	5−1	4 February 2020	
33	(India) Jabamani Soren	Odisha Police	Bidesh XI	3	6−0	4 February 2020	
34	(India) Sandhiya Ranganathan	Sethu	Baroda	4	6−0	6 February 2020	
35	(India) Dular Marandi	SSB Women	Hans Women	3	6−2	15 April 2022	
36	(India) Manisha Kalyan	Gokulam Kerala	Odisha Police	5	12−0	16 April 2022	
37	(India) Sumila Chanu Naorem	SSB Women	Mata Rukmani	3	7−1	24 April 2022	
38	(India) Apurna Narzary	Indian Arrows	Odisha Police	3	4−0	27 April 2022	
39	(India) Pyari Xaxa	Sports Odisha	Sirvodem	3	9−1	27 April 2022	
40	(Ghana) Elshaddai Acheampong	Gokulam Kerala	Mata Rukmani	3	8−0	1 May 2022	
41	(Ghana) Elshaddai Acheampong	Gokulam Kerala	ARA	3	8−0	5 May 2022	
42	(India) Priyangka Devi Naorem	Indian Arrows	Mata Rukmani	4	8−0	13 May 2022	
43	(India) Kiranbala Chanu Yangoijam	Kickstart	Mata Rukmani	4	10−0	18 May 2022	
44	(India) Supriya Routray	Sports Odisha	Hans Women	3	6−0	18 May 2022	
45	(India) Dular Marandi	SSB Women	Odisha Police	4	5−2	21 May 2022	
46	(Ghana) Elshaddai Acheampong	Gokulam Kerala	Sports Odisha	4	7−1	22 May 2022	
47	(India) Ranjita Devi Huidrom	SSB Women	PIFA Sports (Colaba)	4	6−1	25 May 2022	
48	(India) Deepa Nayak	Sports Odisha	Mata Rukmani	4	7−0	26 May 2022	
49	(India) Pyari Xaxa	Sports Odisha	Mata Rukmani	3	7−0	26 May 2022	
50	(Nepal) Sabitra Bhandari	Gokulam Kerala	East Bengal	5	8−2	26 April 2023	
51	(Philippines) Camille Rodriguez	Lords	Celtic Queens	3	4−0	27 April 2023	
52	(India) Kajol D'Souza	Sethu	Churchill Brothers	4	6−0	28 April 2023	
53	(Nepal) Sabitra Bhandari	Gokulam Kerala	Sports Odisha	4	8−1	29 April 2023	
54	(India) Kaviya Pakkirisamy	Kickstart	Churchill Brothers	4	10−0	3 May 2023	
55	(India) Sandhiya Ranganathan	Gokulam Kerala	Kahaani	5	14−1	6 May 2023	
56	(Nepal) Sabitra Bhandari	Gokulam Kerala	Kahaani	4	14−1	6 May 2023	
57	(Nepal) Sabitra Bhandari	Gokulam Kerala	Mumbai Knights	7	11−1	12 May 2023	
58	(Nepal) Sabitra Bhandari	Gokulam Kerala	Mumbai Knights	7	11−1	12 May 2023	
59	(India) Apurna Narzary	Sethu	East Bengal	6	9−0	16 May 2023	
60	(India) Apurna Narzary	Sethu	East Bengal	6	9−0	16 May 2023	
61	(India) Karishma Shirvoikar	Kickstart	East Bengal	3	3−1	16 December 2023	
62	(Uganda) Fazila Ikwaput	Gokulam Kerala	East Bengal	3	4–0	23 January 2024	
63	(Ghana) Fredrica Torkudzor	HOPS	Kickstart	3	5–1	29 January 2024	
64	(India) Soumya Guguloth	Gokulam Kerala	HOPS	3	5–1	3 February 2024	
65	(Uganda) Fazila Ikwaput	Gokulam Kerala	Sports Odisha	4	5–0	3 March 2024	
66	(India) Lynda Kom	Odisha	Kickstart	3	6–0	24 March 2024	
67	(Uganda) Fazila Ikwaput	Gokulam Kerala	Sribhumi	4	5–1	20 January 2025	
68	(Uganda) Fazila Ikwaput	Gokulam Kerala	East Bengal	3	3–2	2 February 2025	
69	(Uganda) Fazila Ikwaput	Gokulam Kerala	Sethu	4	4–1	7 February 2025	
70	(India) Mousumi Murmu	Sribhumi	HOPS	4	5–2	8 March 2025	
71	(Ghana) Elshaddai Acheampong	East Bengal	Odisha	3	3–1	9 March 2025	
72	(India) Bala Devi Ngangom	Sribhumi	Sethu	3	3–2	16 March 2025	
73	(Uganda) Fazila Ikwaput	Gokulam Kerala	Sribhumi	3	3–0	26 March 2025	
74	(Uganda) Fazila Ikwaput	Gokulam Kerala	Nita	4	4–1	13 April 2025	
75	(India) Sibani Devi Nongmeikapam	Sribhumi	Odisha	3	3–0	16 April 2025	
76	(India) Pyari Xaxa	Nita	Sesa	3	6–1	24 December 2025	
77	(India) Pyari Xaxa	Nita	Kickstart	3	5–0	27 December 2025	
78	(India) Lynda Kom	Sethu	Sribhumi	3	4–2	30 December 2025	
79	(Uganda) Fazila Ikwaput	East Bengal	Sesa	4	9–0	30 December 2025	
80	(India) Soumya Guguloth	East Bengal	Sesa	3	9–0	30 December 2025	
81	(Nigeria) Emem Essien	Kickstart	Sesa	3	3–1	9 January 2026	
82	(Uganda) Fazila Ikwaput	East Bengal	Sribhumi	3	3–1	27 April 2026	

== Multiple hat-tricks ==
As of 27 April 2026

Players in bold are still active in the Indian Women's League.

Multiple hat-tricks by player
Rank	Player	Hat-tricks	Last hat-trick
1	(Nepal) Sabitra Bhandari	10	12 May 2023
1	(India) **Bala Devi**	10	16 March 2025
1	(Uganda) **Fazila Ikwaput**	10	27 April 2026
4	(India) **Sandhiya Ranganathan**	5	6 May 2023
5	(Ghana) Elshaddai Acheampong	4	9 March 2025
5	(India) **Pyari Xaxa**	4	27 December 2025
7	(India) **Ratanbala Devi**	3	12 May 2019
7	(India) **Kamala Devi**	3	4 February 2020
7	(India) **Apurna Narzary**	3	16 May 2023
7	(India) **Soumya Guguloth**	3	30 December 2025
11	(India) Manisha Kalyan	2	16 April 2022
11	(India) Dular Marandi	2	21 May 2022
11	(India) **Karishma Shirvoikar**	2	16 December 2023
11	(India) **Lynda Kom**	2	30 December 2025

Multiple hat-tricks in a single match
Rank	Player	Double hat-trick
1	(India) **Bala Devi**	2
2	(Nepal) Sabitra Bhandari	1
3	(India) **Apurna Narzary**	1

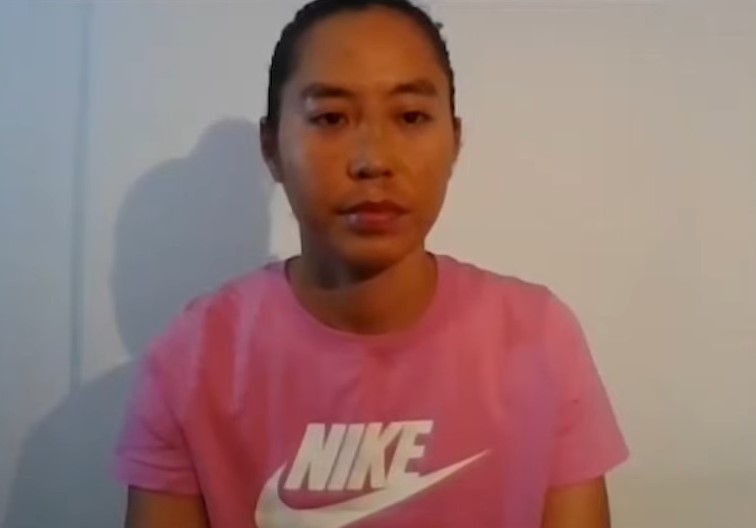
Bala Devi scored 10 hat-tricks as well as multiple hat-tricks in a single match twice. Both are the most by any Indian in IWL.

== Hat-tricks by club ==
As of 27 April 2026

Club	Hat-tricks	Last
Gokulam Kerala	25	13 April 2025
Sethu	13	30 December 2025
Manipur Police	7	20 May 2019
SSB Women	4	25 May 2022
Sports Odisha	4	26 May 2022
Kickstart	4	9 January 2026
East Bengal	4	27 April 2026
Eastern Sporting Union	3	11 February 2017
KRYPHSA	3	10 April 2018
Sribhumi	3	16 April 2025
Rising Students	2	8 February 2017
Indian Arrows	2	13 May 2022
Nita	2	27 December 2025
Alakhpura	1	31 January 2017
Kenkre	1	25 January 2020
Odisha Police	1	4 February 2020
Odisha	1	24 March 2024
Lords	1	27 April 2023
HOPS	1	29 January 2024

== Hat-tricks by nationality ==
As of 27 April 2026

The following table lists the number of hat-tricks scored by players from a single nation.

Rank	Nation	Hat-tricks	Last hat-trick
1	India	55	30 December 2025
2	Nepal	10	12 May 2023
2	Uganda	10	27 April 2026
4	Ghana	5	9 March 2025
5	Philippines	1	27 April 2023
5	Nigeria	1	9 January 2025

== See also ==
- List of Indian Super League hat-tricks
- List of I-League hat-tricks
- List of India women's national football team hat-tricks
