= Diconium =

German digital services company headquartered in Stuttgart

Diconium Group GmbH
- Type: GmbH
- Industry: IT services
- Founded: 1995; 31 years ago
- Headquarters: Stuttgart, Germany
- Key people: Jasmin Eichler, Thomas Dyckhoff
- Revenue: €200 million (2023)
- Number of employees: 2,500 (2026)
- Website: diconium.com

Diconium Group GmbH (official spelling: DICONIUM, formerly dmc digital media center GmbH) is a digital technology company headquartered in Stuttgart. It specializes in building software delivery organizations and focuses on digital sales solutions, software-defined products, cybersecurity and compliance, and AI transformation. Since January 2020, Diconium has been a wholly owned subsidiary of the Volkswagen Group.

== History ==
Diconium was founded in 1995 as dmc digital media center GmbH by Andreas Schwend and Daniel Rebhorn. The company started as a project to build an enterprise resource planning system for mid-sized businesses, during which the two founders became interested in trends in digital publishing and the possibilities of the World Wide Web. At a symposium on digital television in Baden-Württemberg, they met their first client, the mail-order company Neckermann. In the following years, dmc worked with other companies on what was later termed digital transformation.

Later, the company established and developed Embitel, a partner company based in Bengaluru. Embitel initially served as an offshore development unit for the Stuttgart office, serving local markets in Asia, the United Arab Emirates, and the United States. In 2015, Cinteo GmbH was founded; it was later acquired in full by the Stuttgart-based automaker Daimler. Cinteo focused on the digital strategy of Mercedes-Benz. Diconium has been entered in the commercial register at the district court of Stuttgart since October 7, 2016. In late 2018, Volkswagen AG acquired a 49 percent stake in Diconium. The aim of the investment was the joint development of a digital sales platform for connected vehicles. Since January 2020, Diconium has been a wholly owned subsidiary of Volkswagen AG. Within the Volkswagen Group, Diconium was initially assigned to Cariad; in 2024 it was reassigned to Volkswagen Group IT.

Diconium is led by eleven managing directors. The managing partner of the Embitel group is Sharad Bairathi.

== Company ==
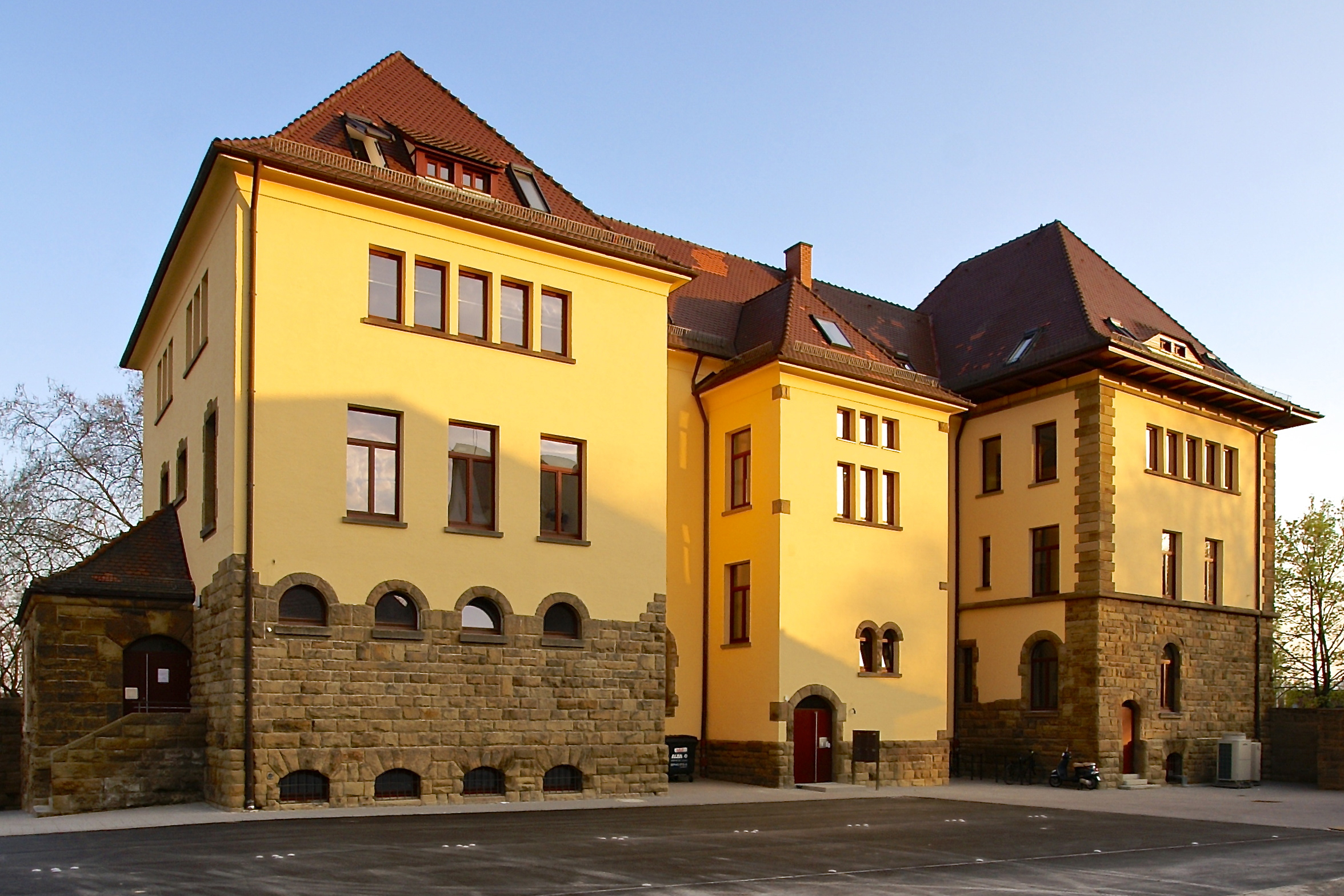
Stuttgart office, headquarters

Diconium operates as a GmbH (limited liability company), with its headquarters located in the Stuttgart-Bad Cannstatt district. Since July 2025, Diconium has been undergoing an organizational restructuring. The former Diconium GmbH, including its central functions, was merged with Diconium digital GmbH and has since operated as Diconium Group GmbH. At the same time, the operating subsidiaries – Diconium strategy GmbH, Diconium digital solutions GmbH, Diconium data GmbH, and Diconium auto GmbH – were consolidated into the newly founded Diconium Germany GmbH, which serves as the primary operating company.

In addition to companies within the Volkswagen Group, Diconium serves clients from other sectors, including manufacturing, retail, FMCG, and mobility. These include, among others, STIHL, Bechtle, Trumpf, Häfele, Edeka, Mann+Hummel, and KiK.

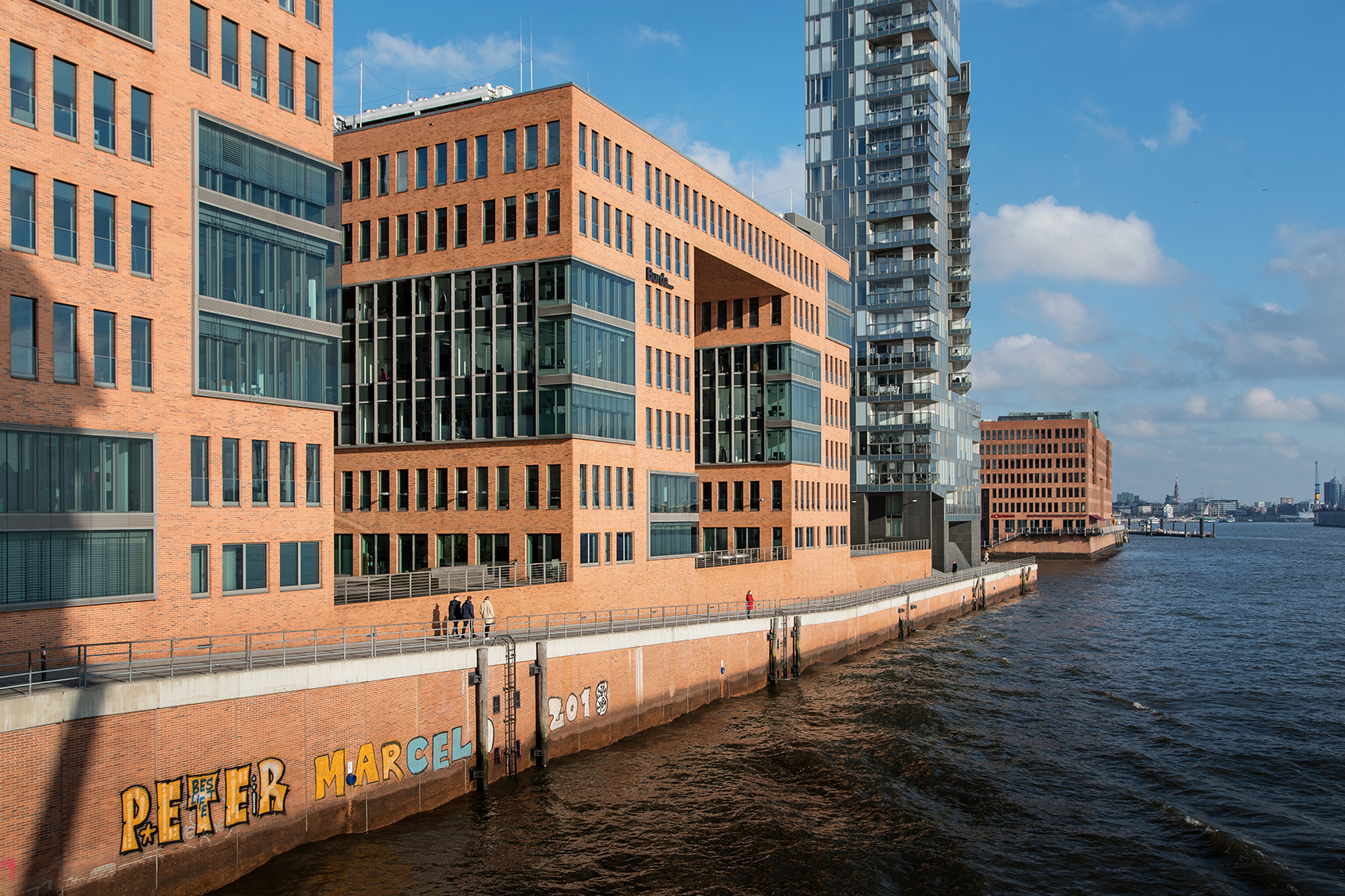
Hamburg office

=== Locations ===
As of September 2026, Diconium has approximately 2,500 employees across 15 locations: Stuttgart, Berlin, Hamburg, Munich, Wolfsburg, Dresden, Karlsruhe, and Ingolstadt, as well as Bucharest, Bengaluru, Beijing, Lisbon, Porto, San José, and the UAE.

== Collaboration with Volkswagen ==
In January 2020, Volkswagen and Diconium's founding shareholders agreed on Volkswagen's acquisition of the remaining stake in Diconium. With the complete acquisition of these shares, Volkswagen is strengthening its capabilities in the development of digital sales solutions. This includes the development of a global online sales platform through which customers of all Group brands will be able to purchase and manage digital services and on-demand features for their fully connected vehicles. Diconium is contributing its expertise in this area to Cariad, which develops cross-brand in-vehicle software, digital ecosystems, and customer-facing retail functions. These include features such as in-car multimedia streaming, automatic payment for fuel, charging, and parking, as well as vehicle updates. To this end, the online sales platform will be linked to the Volkswagen Automotive Cloud, which Cariad is also responsible for developing. Alongside the Swedish telematics specialist Wirelesscar and the U.S. software giant Microsoft, Diconium is the third technology partner with whose help Volkswagen aims to create its own digital ecosystem. For Volkswagen, the acquisition was a strategic move to enable it to offer the ID.3 electric car with comprehensive digital services.

The collaboration of teams from Volkswagen and Diconium started in July 2019 at the new Volkswagen We Campus in Berlin. Around 900 specialists were gradually brought together at the We Campus to develop new mobility services and digital offerings.
