= Linthoingambi Devi Maibam =

Indian footballer (b. 1999)

Linthoingambi Devi
Personal information
- Full name: Linthoingambi Devi Maibam
- Date of birth: 2 February 1999 (age 27)
- Place of birth: Thoubal, Manipur, India
- Position: Goalkeeper

Team information
- Current team: Kickstart
- Number: 1

Senior career*
Years	Team	Apps	(Gls)
2016–2018	Eastern Sporting Union	10	(0)
2019–2019	Gokulam Kerala	6	(0)
2019–2020	KRYPHSA	7	(0)
2021–	Kickstart	47	(0)

International career^{‡}
2014	India U16		
2017	India U19	2	
2019–	India	13	(0)
- * Club domestic league appearances and goals ‡ National team caps and goals as of 2 January 2025

Linthoingambi Devi Maibam (Meitei: Maibam Linthoingambi Devi, born 2 February 1999) is an Indian professional footballer who plays as a goalkeeper for Kickstart in the Indian Women's League and the India women's national football team.

== Career ==
=== International ===
She was also a member of 2020 AFC Women's Olympic Qualifying Tournament.

== Career statistics ==
=== International ===
As of 2 January 2025

National team	Year	Caps	Goals
India	2019	5	0
India	2021	5	0
India	2022	1	0
India	2024	2	0
Total		13	0

== Honours ==
India

- SAFF Women's Championship: 2019
- South Asian Games Gold medal: 2019

KRYPHSA

- Indian Women's League runner-up: 2019–20

Kickstart

- Indian Women's League runner-up: 2022–23

Manipur

- Rajmata Jijabai Trophy: 2019–20, 2023–24
- National Games Gold medal: 2022

Individual

- Indian Women's League Best Goalkeeper: 2018–19, 2019–20, 2021–22, 2022–23
