= Aditi Chauhan =

Indian footballer (born 1992)

Personal information
- Date of birth: November 20, 1992 (age 33)
- Place of birth: Chennai, Tamil Nadu, India
- Position: Goalkeeper

College career
Years	Team	Apps	(Gls)
- University of Delhi
2013–2015	Loughborough University		

Senior career*
Years	Team	Apps	(Gls)
2015−2018	West Ham United	20	(0)
2018−2019	India Rush SC		
2019−2021	Gokulam Kerala		
2021	Hamar Hveragerði		
2022−2023	Gokulam Kerala		
2025	Sreebhumi		

International career
2008−2012	India U19	4	(0)
2011−2023	India	57	(0)
- * Club domestic league appearances and goals

Aditi Chauhan (born 20 November 1992) is an Indian former footballer who played as a goalkeeper. She represented the Indian national football team.

== Early life and education ==
Chauhan was born in Chennai, Tamil Nadu into a Rajput family. She moved with her family to Delhi when she was barely nine years old. She did her schooling from Amity International School. As a child she participated in karate and basketball, even being selected for the youth state basketball team. She was also a black belt in karate. She was convinced by her coach to attend trials for the football team as a goalkeeper. Chauhan was successful and eventually, appeared on the team for the Delhi women's football team U19 squad. She did an MSc in Sports Management at Loughborough University.

== Club career ==
Chauhan represented the Loughborough University while studying MSc in Sports Management. In August 2015, she joined West Ham United Ladies. She made her debut on 16 August 2015 in a 0–5 defeat by Coventry Ladies and became the first player from the India national women's team to play the semi-professional league in England. Later, she played for Hammers for two seasons, and the first Indian woman to play in English league football. She spent two seasons with the club before returning to India in early 2018. She went on to join India Rush. For the 2019–20 Indian Women's League, she joined Gokulam Kerala FC with whom she won two league titles. In 2021, she was also part of the Gokulam team, which came third in the AFC Women's Club Championship. In 2021, she also played for Iceland's Hamar Hveragerdi. She played for one season with Sreebhumi FC in 2025 before retirement.

== International career ==
Chauhan was selected for trials with the India U19 side at age 17. She was a part of the India senior team that won the 2012 SAFF Women's Championship in Sri Lanka.

=== Post retirement career ===
Chauhan announced her retirement on 17 July 2025. Between 2011 and 2023, she earned 57 caps with the Indian women's national football team. She was part of the Indian team that won the South Asian Games in 2016 and 2019.

In 2023, she started a club called, She Kicks Football Academy, through which she trains underprivileged children in Delhi. In the first batch she took 30 players. In the same year, the academy entered into an agreement with UK Elite Sports Group to promote grassroots development of the game in India.

== Career statistics ==
=== International ===
As of 15 February 2023

National team	Year	Caps	Goals
India	2011	1	0
India	2012	5	0
India	2013	0	0
India	2014	3	0
India	2015	0	0
India	2016	7	0
India	2017	2	0
India	2018	3	0
India	2019	22	0
India	2021	8	0
India	2022	5	0
India	2023	1	0
Total		57	0

== Honours ==
India

- SAFF Women's Championship: 2012, 2016, 2019
- South Asian Games Gold medal: 2016, 2019

Gokulam Kerala

- Indian Women's League: 2019–20, 2021–22
- AFC Women's Club Championship: third place 2021

Individual

- Asian Football Awards: Women in Football Award 2015

== See also ==
- List of Indian football players in foreign leagues
