= Sandhiya Ranganathan =

Indian footballer

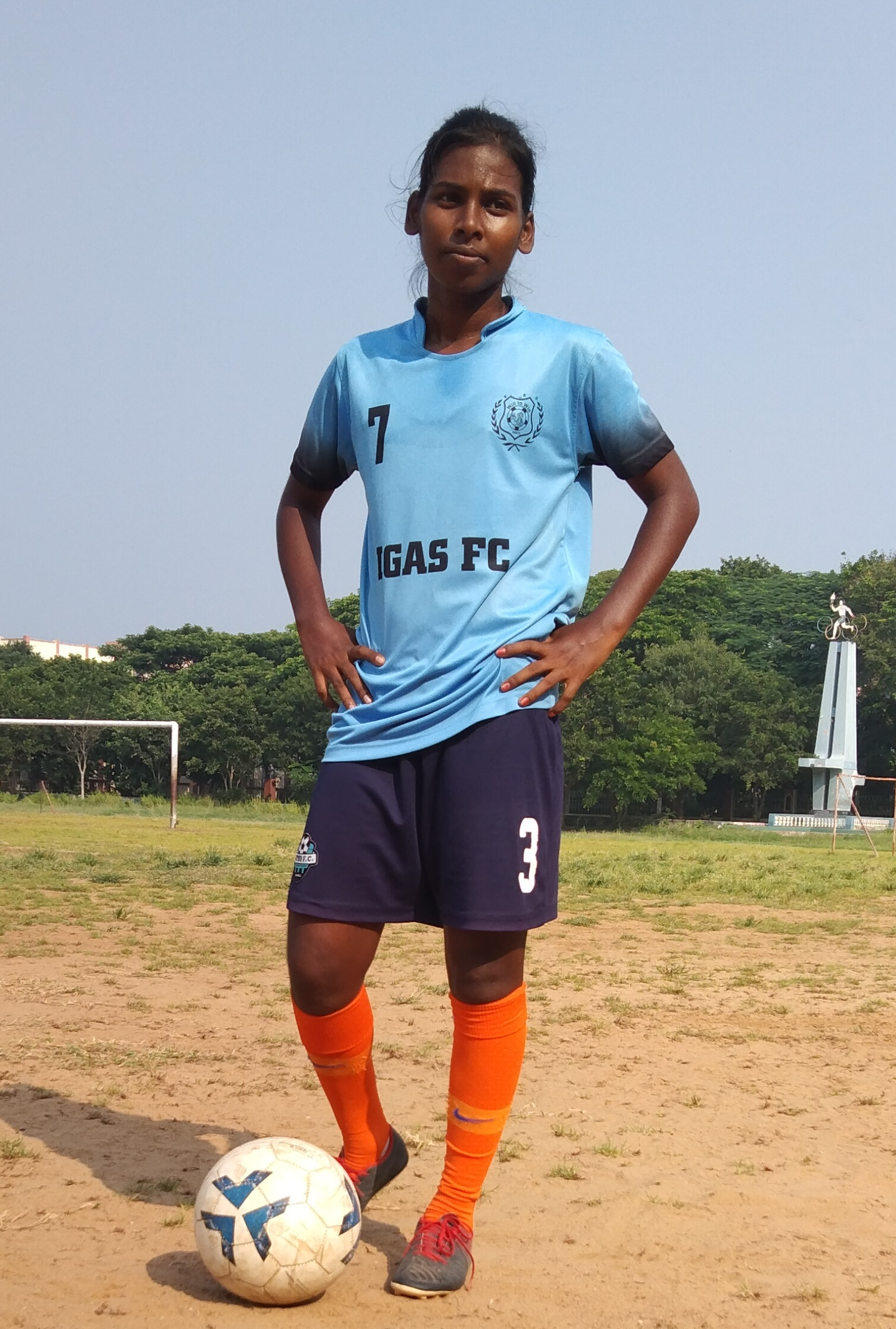
- Sandhiya in 2020

Personal information
- Full name: Sandhiya Ranganathan
- Date of birth: 20 May 1998 (age 28)
- Place of birth: Panruti, Tamil Nadu, India
- Position: Forward

Team information
- Current team: Sethu

Senior career*
Years	Team	Apps	(Gls)
2016–2017	Jeppiaar Institute	5	(3)
2018–2021	Sethu	25	(27)
2023–2024	Gokulam Kerala	21	(15)
2024–2026	East Bengal		
2026–	Sethu		

International career^{‡}
2019–	India	48	(10)
- * Club domestic league appearances and goals as of 24 March 2024 ‡ National team caps and goals as of 26 February 2025

Sandhiya Ranganathan (born 20 May 1998) is an Indian professional footballer who plays as a forward for the Indian Women's League club Sethu and the India women's national team.

== International career ==
She scored her first goal in 2018 in the COTIF Women's Football Tournament. Then she scored her second goal against Sri Lanka in the 2019 SAFF Women's Championship on 17 March 2019. In 2020 AFC Women's Olympic Qualifying Round 2 she scored another important goal for the national team against Nepal on 6 April 2019.

== Career statistics ==
=== International ===
As of 26 February 2025

National team	Year	Caps	Goals
India	2019	17	7
India	2021	7	0
India	2022	6	0
India	2023	10	3
India	2024	6	0
India	2025	2	0
Total		48	10

Scores and results list India's goal tally first.

List of international goals scored by Sandhiya Ranganathan
No.	Date	Venue	Opponent	Score	Result	Competition
1.	13 March 2019	Sahid Rangasala, Biratnagar, Nepal	Maldives	2–0	6–0	2019 SAFF Women's Championship
2.	17 March 2019	Sahid Rangasala, Biratnagar, Nepal	Sri Lanka	2–0	5–0	2019 SAFF Women's Championship
3.	6 April 2019	Mandalarthiri Stadium, Mandalay, Myanmar	Nepal	2–1	3–1	2020 Olympic Qualifiers
4.	9 April 2019	Mandalarthiri Stadium, Mandalay, Myanmar	Myanmar	1–0	3–3	2020 Olympic Qualifiers
5.	2 September 2019	Yakkasary Stadium, Tashkent, Uzbekistan	Uzbekistan	1–0	1–1	Friendly
6.	5 December 2019	Pokhara Rangasala, Pokhara, Nepal	Sri Lanka	2–0	6–0	2019 South Asian Games
7.	5 December 2019	Pokhara Rangasala, Pokhara, Nepal	Sri Lanka	4–0	6–0	2019 South Asian Games
8.	7 April 2023	Dolen Omurzakov Stadium, Bishkek, Kyrgyzstan	Kyrgyzstan	1–0	4–0	2024 Olympic Qualifiers
9.	7 April 2023	Dolen Omurzakov Stadium, Bishkek, Kyrgyzstan	Kyrgyzstan	3–0	4–0	2024 Olympic Qualifiers
10.	29 October 2023	Lokomotiv Stadium, Tashkent, Uzbekistan	Vietnam	1–3	1–3	2024 Olympic Qualifiers

== Honours ==
India

- SAFF Women's Championship: 2019
- South Asian Games Gold medal: 2019

Sethu

- Indian Women's League: 2018–19

Gokulam Kerala

- Indian Women's League: 2022–23

East Bengal

- Indian Women's League: 2024–25

Tamil Nadu

- Rajmata Jijabai Trophy: 2022–23
- National Games Bronze medal: 2022

Individual

- Indian Women's League Most Valuable Player: 2018–19

== See also ==
- List of Indian Women's League hat-tricks
