= Anju Tamang =

Indian footballer

Personal information
- Date of birth: 22 December 1995 (age 30)
- Place of birth: Uttar Rangali Bazna, Alipurduar, West Bengal, India
- Position: Forward

Team information
- Current team: Sribhumi
- Number: 9

Senior career*
Years	Team	Apps	(Gls)
- Share FC Kalimpong
2017–2018	Rising Student Club		
2019–2020	Gokulam Kerala	5	(5)
2020–2021	KRYPHSA	3	(2)
2022	Sethu	9	(2)
2022–2023	Odisha		
2023–2024	Gokulam Kerala	11	(5)
2024–2025	East Bengal		
2025–	Sribhumi		

International career^{‡}
2017–	India	69	(15)
- * Club domestic league appearances and goals as of 10 March 2024 ‡ National team caps and goals as of 5 July 2025

Anju Tamang (born 22 December 1995) is an Indian professional footballer who plays as a forward for the Indian Women's League club Sribhumi and the India women's national team.

== Early life ==
Tamang was born to Ram Singh Tamang and Kanchi Maya in Uttar Rangali Bazna, near Birpara in the district of Alipurduar, West Bengal. She is of Tamang descent and comes from a family of farmers. Her schooling was done at the Alagarah High School, Kalimpong and the Scottish Universities’ Mission Institution (SUMI), Kalimpong. She went on for higher studies at the University of North Bengal, Siliguri.

== Career ==
Tamang played football with boys while growing up and did not encounter a professional coach until she was 17. At the age of 19, she progressed to an academy and played in the inaugural Indian Women's League.

== Career statistics ==
=== International ===
As of 5 July 2025

National team	Year	Caps	Goals
India	2017	5	0
India	2018	2	0
India	2019	21	4
India	2021	10	1
India	2022	6	4
India	2023	12	4
India	2024	9	1
India	2025	4	1
Total		69	15

Scores and results list India's goal tally first.

List of international goals scored by Anju Tamang
No.	Date	Venue	Opponent	Score	Result	Competition
1.	9 February 2019	Kalinga Stadium, Bhubaneswar, India	Iran	1–0	1–0	2019 Women's Gold Cup
2.	1 March 2019	Alanya, Turkey	Turkmenistan	4–0	10–0	2019 Turkish Women's Cup
3.	1 March 2019	Alanya, Turkey	Turkmenistan	9–0	10–0	2019 Turkish Women's Cup
4.	22 March 2019	Sahid Rangasala, Biratnagar, Nepal	Nepal	3–1	3–1	2019 SAFF Women's Championship
5.	2 October 2021	Theyab Awana Stadium, Dubai, United Arab Emirates	United Arab Emirates	4–1	4–1	Friendly
6.	10 September 2022	Dasharath Rangasala, Kathmandu, Nepal	Maldives	1–0	9–0	2022 SAFF Women's Championship
7.	10 September 2022	Dasharath Rangasala, Kathmandu, Nepal	Maldives	3–0	9–0	2022 SAFF Women's Championship
8.	10 September 2022	Dasharath Rangasala, Kathmandu, Nepal	Maldives	7–0	9–0	2022 SAFF Women's Championship
9.	10 September 2022	Dasharath Rangasala, Kathmandu, Nepal	Maldives	9–0	9–0	2022 SAFF Women's Championship
10.	4 April 2023	Dolen Omurzakov Stadium, Bishkek, Kyrgyzstan	Kyrgyzstan	1–0	5–0	2024 AFC Women's Olympic Qualifying Tournament
11.	4 April 2023	Dolen Omurzakov Stadium, Bishkek, Kyrgyzstan	Kyrgyzstan	2–0	5–0	2024 AFC Women's Olympic Qualifying Tournament
12.	7 April 2023	Dolen Omurzakov Stadium, Bishkek, Kyrgyzstan	Kyrgyzstan	2–0	4–0	2024 AFC Women's Olympic Qualifying Tournament
13.	21 September 2023	Wenzhou Sports Centre, Wenzhou, China	Chinese Taipei	1–0	1–2	2022 Asian Games
14.	24 February 2024	Gold City Sports Complex, Alanya, Turkey	Hong Kong	1–0	2–0	2024 Turkish Women's Cup
15.	29 June 2025	700th Anniversary Stadium, Chiang Mai, Thailand	Timor-Leste	2–0	4–0	2026 AFC Women's Asian Cup qualification

== Honours ==
India

- SAFF Women's Championship: 2019
- South Asian Games Gold medal: 2019

East Bengal

- Indian Women's League: 2024–25

Rising Students Club

- Indian Women's League: 2017–18

KRYPHSA

- Indian Women's League runner-up: 2019–20

== See also ==
- List of India women's national football team hat-tricks
