= Ratanbala Devi Nongmaithem =

Indian footballer

Ratanbala Devi
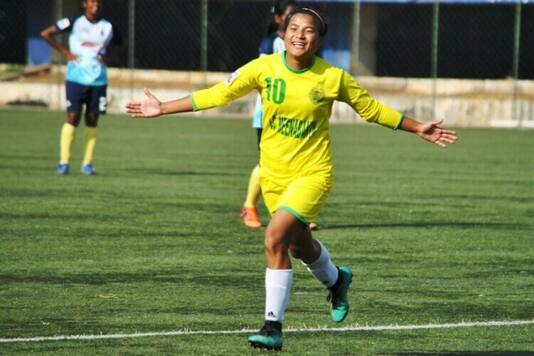

Personal information
- Full name: Ratanbala Devi Nongmaithem
- Date of birth: 2 December 1999 (age 26)
- Place of birth: Manipur, India
- Position: Midfielder

Team information
- Current team: Sribhumi

Senior career*
Years	Team	Apps	(Gls)
2017–2018	KRYPHSA	6	(7)
2018–2019	Sethu	7	(8)
2019–2020	KRYPHSA	7	(10)
2021–2025	Gokulam Kerala	34	(3)
2025–	Sribhumi		

International career^{‡}
2014	India U19		
2017–	India	48	(13)
- * Club domestic league appearances and goals as of 18 April 2025 ‡ National team caps and goals as of 27 October 2025

Ratanbala Devi Nongmaithem (Meitei: Nongmaithem Ratanbala Devi, born 2 December 1999) is an Indian professional footballer from Manipur, who plays for as a midfielder for the Indian Women's League club Sribhumi and India women's national football team. She played her debut international match in the AFC Cup Qualifiers 2018.

== Career ==
Ratanbala was called up for the national team during the 2018 AFC Women's Asian Cup Qualifiers, where she scored her first goal against Hong Kong on 11 April 2017. She then became a regular member of the India women's national football team. Her second goal was against Myanmar in the 2020 AFC Women's Olympic Qualifiers Round 1 on 13 November 2018. The 3rd was in a friendly against Hong Kong on 21 January 2019, the 4th at another friendly against Indonesia on 27 January 2019 where she scored her first hattrick for the national team. In the 2019 Gold Cup she scored another goal against Nepal on 11 February 2019. In 2019 SAFF Women's Championship she scored 2 goals, 1 against Maldives on 13 March and another against Sri Lanka on 17 March. In the 2020 AFC Women's Olympic Qualifiers Round 2 she scored 1 goal in a 3–3 draw against Myanmar on 9 April 2019. However, India didn't qualify for the 2020 AFC Women's Olympic Qualifiers Round 3 because of a lower goal ratio.

== Career statistics ==
=== International ===
As of 27 October 2025

National team	Year	Caps	Goals
India	2017	4	1
India	2018	3	1
India	2019	25	10
India	2021	0	0
India	2022	6	0
India	2023	0	0
India	2024	0	0
India	2025	10	1
Total		48	13

Scores and results list India's goal tally first.

List of international goals scored by Nongmaithem Ratanbala Devi
No.	Date	Venue	Opponent	Score	Result	Competition
1.	11 April 2017	Kim Il-sung Stadium, Pyongyang, North Korea	Hong Kong	2–0	2–0	2018 AFC Women's Asian Cup Qualifiers
2.	13 November 2018	Thuwunna Stadium, Yangon, Myanmar	Myanmar	1–1	1–2	2020 AFC Women's Olympic Qualifiers
3.	21 January 2019	Hong Kong	Hong Kong	5–2	5–2	Friendly
4.	27 January 2019	Benteng Taruna Stadium, Tangerang, Indonesia	Indonesia	1–0	3–0	Friendly
5.	27 January 2019	Benteng Taruna Stadium, Tangerang, Indonesia	Indonesia	2–0	3–0	Friendly
6.	27 January 2019	Benteng Taruna Stadium, Tangerang, Indonesia	Indonesia	3–0	3–0	Friendly
7.	11 February 2019	Kalinga Stadium, Bhubaneswar, India	Nepal	1–2	1–2	2019 Women's Gold Cup
8.	13 March 2019	Sahid Rangasala, Biratnagar, Nepal	Maldives	5–0	6–0	2019 SAFF Women's Championship
9.	17 March 2019	Sahid Rangasala, Biratnagar, Nepal	Sri Lanka	5–0	5–0	2019 SAFF Women's Championship
10.	9 April 2019	Mandalarthiri Stadium, Mandalay, Myanmar	Myanmar	3–2	3–3	2020 AFC Women's Olympic Qualifiers
11.	5 December 2019	Pokhara Rangasala, Pokhara, Nepal	Sri Lanka	3–0	6–0	2019 South Asian Games
12.	5 December 2019	Pokhara Rangasala, Pokhara, Nepal	Sri Lanka	5–0	6–0	2019 South Asian Games
13.	2 July 2025	700th Anniversary Stadium, Chiang Mai, Thailand	Iraq	5–0	5–0	2026 AFC Women's Asian Cup qualification

== Honours ==
India

- SAFF Women's Championship: 2019
- South Asian Games gold medal: 2019

Sethu

- Indian Women's League: 2018–19

Gokulam Kerala

- Indian Women's League: 2021–22

KRYPHSA

- Indian Women's League runner-up: 2019–20

Manipur

- Rajmata Jijabai Trophy: 2023–24
- National Games gold medal: 2022

Individual

- Indian Women's League Most Valuable Player: 2019–20
- Indian Women's League Emerging Player: 2018–19
