= Elshaddai Acheampong =

Ghanaian footballer (born 2003)

Personal information
- Full name: Elshaddai Acheampong
- Date of birth: 16 August 2003 (age 23)
- Place of birth: Kumasi, Ghana
- Position: Forward

Team information
- Current team: Hapoel Ra'anana

Senior career*
Years	Team	Apps	(Gls)
- Police Ladies
2021−2022	Gokulam Kerala	11	(20)
2022−2024	Apollon Ladies	16	(12)
2024	Hakkarigücü Spor		
2025	East Bengal	13	(10)
2025−	Hapoel Ra'anana		

International career
2018	Ghana U17		
- * Club domestic league appearances and goals

Elshaddai Acheampong (born 16 August 2003) is a Ghanaian women's professional footballer who plays as a forward for Hapoel Ra'anana. She also played for Gokulam Kerala in the Indian Women's League and was the top scorer in 2022.

== Early life ==
Acheampong was born in Kumasi and started playing football at the age of six. She played for Police Ladies.

== Career ==
In 2021–22, Acheampong scored 20 goals from 11 matches to bag the Golden Boot award and a cash prize in the IWL. Gokulam also won the League for the second successive time in 2021–22. In the 2022/2023 season, she was signed by Apollon Ladies F.C. where she won 2 trophies and also played in the UEFA Women's Champions League. She was then transferred to East Bengal in 2024/2025 season. In between, she played the Turkcell Women's Football Super League in Turkey for Hakkarigucu Spor team in September 2024.

On 9 March 2025, she scored a hattrick for East Bengal against Odisha FC in their 3–1 victory.

She has been playing for the Ghana team since 2018 and was also selected to play the FIFA U-20 Women's World Cup for Ghana.

== Honours ==
Gokulam Kerala

- Indian Women's League: 2021–22

East Bengal

- Indian Women's League: 2024–25
