= Grace Dangmei =

Indian footballer

Personal information
- Full name: Grace Dangmei
- Date of birth: 5 February 1996 (age 30)
- Place of birth: Dimdailong, Churachandpur, Manipur, India
- Height: 1.53 m (5 ft 0 in)
- Position: Forward

Team information
- Current team: Sribhumi
- Number: 13

Senior career*
| Years | Team | Apps | (Gls) |
| 2016–2018 | KRYPHSA | 9 | (8) |
| 2019 | Sethu | 7 | (8) |
| 2021–2022 | Gokulam Kerala | 11 | (4) |
| 2022–2023 | Sevinch Qarshi | 14 | (4) |
| 2023–2024 | Gokulam Kerala | 20 | (3) |
| 2024–2025 | Kickstart | | |
| 2025– | Sribhumi | | |

International career^{‡}
| 2014 | India U19 | 3 | (1) |
| 2013–2026 | India | 96 | (24) |
- * Club domestic league appearances and goals ‡ National team caps and goals as of 6 June 2026

Grace Dangmei (born 5 February 1996) is an Indian professional footballer who plays as a forward for Sribhumi and the India women's national team. She was part of the team from 2014 to 2022 Asian Games. At the 2016 South Asian Games she scored two goals against Sri Lanka. During the 2016 SAFF Women's Championship she scored a goal in the final, helping India clinch its fourth consecutive title.

== Early life ==
Grace Dangmei was born to Simon Dangmei and Rita Dangmei. She belongs to the Rongmei tribe from Dimdailong Village, Kangvai Sub-Division, Churachandpur District, Manipur.

== Club career ==
Dangmei played the inaugural edition of the Indian Women's League with KRYPHSA and spent another season with the club. She joined Sethu in 2019 for the 3rd edition of the IWL. During the 2018 Indian Women's League, she was awarded the Emerging Player Award. She scored a brace in her first match with Sethu FC against Manipur Police Sports Club on 6 May 2019, and won the 2018–19 IWL season.

She then joined Gokulam Kerala in 2021, and earned vice-captaincy. Later on July 15, 2021, the All India Football Federation (AIFF) nominated Gokulam Kerala to represent India in the AFC Women's Club Championship 2020–21 pilot tournament. She appeared in the matches of the 2021 AFC Women's Club Championship. She had a brilliant performance against FC Bunyodkor (women), which is the women's team of Uzbekistan on 14 November, where her side won 3–1. In that continental tournament, they achieved third place. In the 2021–22 season, her team Gokulam Kerala clinched the title and qualified for the AFC Women's Club Championship.

On July 2, 2022, it was announced Grace had signed a professional contract abroad, with the Uzbek Women's League side FC Nasaf Karshi on a season-long deal. She helped her Uzbek team win both the league and cup in that calendar year, scoring 4 goals in 14 league matches.

== International career ==
Grace appeared with India U-19 in 2014.

From my parents to all the coaches that I have trained under, as well as the players that I have played with, I am grateful for the support that I have always received. I feel people don't realize that we are much ahead of the men's team in terms of FIFA rankings and maybe we don't get enough credit sometimes, but with us participating in more and more international competitions, that will hopefully change.

— Grace Dangmei, on her journey with football.

She made her senior international debut at the AFC Qualifiers in 2013, and became a regular member of the women's national team. In the six years with the national team, she made 37 appearances and scored 14 goals.

In November 2019, she played the first round of the Tokyo 2020 Olympics qualifying tournament at Myanmar.

Later, at the 2019 South Asian Games, they clinched a gold, defeating Nepal. Her brace against Indonesia at the 2020 AFC Women's Olympic Qualifier Round 2 match, gave her popular fame.

Grace represented India at the 2021 International Women's Football Tournament of Manaus, where they faced teams like Brazil, and Chile. She scored a goal against Venezuela on December 1, in their 2–1 defeat.

On 7 September 2022, at the SAFF Women's Championship in Nepal, she scored a goal against Pakistan in their 3–0 win. In 2022, she played the AFC Women's Asian Cup. In August 2023, she played the 2022 Asian Games at Hangzhou, China.

=== Retirement ===
On 6 June 2026, she announced her retirement after captaining India to SAFF Women's Championship title after seven years defeating Bangladesh 3–1 at Goa. She has represented the country 95 times and scored 24 goals. The victory brought her the third SAFF title after the 2016 and 2019 triumphs.

== Career statistics ==
=== International ===
As of 6 June 2026

| National team | Year | Caps | Goals |
|---|---|---|---|
| India | 2013 | 3 | 0 |
| India | 2014 | 1 | 0 |
| India | 2015 | 2 | 0 |
| India | 2016 | 5 | 3 |
| India | 2017 | 7 | 1 |
| India | 2018 | 3 | 0 |
| India | 2019 | 26 | 11 |
| India | 2021 | 11 | 1 |
| India | 2022 | 6 | 3 |
| India | 2023 | 12 | 1 |
| India | 2024 | 7 | 2 |
| India | 2025 | 9 | 1 |
| India | 2026 | 4 | 1 |
| Total | | 96 | 24 |

Scores and results list India's goal tally first.

List of international goals scored by Grace Dangmei
| No. | Date | Venue | Opponent | Score | Result | Competition |
|---|---|---|---|---|---|---|
| 1. | 9 February 2016 | Jawaharlal Nehru Stadium, Shillong, India | Sri Lanka | 2–0 | 5–0 | 2016 South Asian Games |
| 2. | 9 February 2016 | Jawaharlal Nehru Stadium, Shillong, India | Sri Lanka | 3–0 | 5–0 | 2016 South Asian Games |
| 3. | 27 December 2016 | Kanchenjunga Stadium, Siliguri, India | Afghanistan | 4–1 | 5–1 | 2016 SAFF Women's Championship |
| 4. | 4 January 2017 | Kanchenjunga Stadium, Siliguri, India | Bangladesh | 1–0 | 3–1 | 2016 SAFF Women's Championship |
| 5. | 21 January 2019 | Hong Kong | Hong Kong | 1–0 | 5–2 | Friendly |
| 6. | 21 January 2019 | Hong Kong | Hong Kong | 2–1 | 5–2 | Friendly |
| 7. | 30 January 2019 | Benteng Taruna Stadium, Tangerang, Indonesia | Indonesia | 2–0 | 2–0 | Friendly |
| 8. | 1 March 2019 | Alanya, Turkey | Turkmenistan | 1–0 | 10–0 | 2019 Turkish Women's Cup |
| 9. | 13 March 2019 | Sahid Rangasala, Biratnagar, Nepal | Maldives | 1–0 | 6–0 | 2019 SAFF Women's Championship |
| 10. | 17 March 2019 | Sahid Rangasala, Biratnagar, Nepal | Sri Lanka | 1–0 | 5–0 | 2019 SAFF Women's Championship |
| 11. | 22 March 2019 | Sahid Rangasala, Biratnagar, Nepal | Nepal | 2–1 | 3–1 | 2019 SAFF Women's Championship |
| 12. | 3 April 2019 | Thuwunna Stadium, Yangon, Myanmar | Indonesia | 1–0 | 2–0 | 2020 Olympic Qualifiers |
| 13. | 3 April 2019 | Thuwunna Stadium, Yangon, Myanmar | Indonesia | 2–0 | 2–0 | 2020 Olympic Qualifiers |
| 14. | 3 December 2019 | Pokhara Rangasala, Pokhara, Nepal | Maldives | 1–0 | 5–0 | 2019 South Asian Games |
| 15. | 5 December 2019 | Pokhara Rangasala, Pokhara, Nepal | Sri Lanka | 5–0 | 6–0 | 2019 South Asian Games |
| 16. | 1 December 2021 | Arena da Amazônia, Manaus, Brazil | Venezuela | 1–0 | 1–2 | 2021 International Football Tournament of Manaus |
| 17. | 7 September 2022 | Dasharath Rangasala, Kathmandu, Nepal | Pakistan | 2–0 | 3–0 | 2022 SAFF Women's Championship |
| 18. | 10 September 2022 | Dasharath Rangasala, Kathmandu, Nepal | Maldives | 4–0 | 9–0 | 2022 SAFF Women's Championship |
| 19. | 10 September 2022 | Dasharath Rangasala, Kathmandu, Nepal | Maldives | 8–0 | 9–0 | 2022 SAFF Women's Championship |
| 20. | 28 March 2023 | Pakhtakor Stadium, Tashkent, Uzbekistan | Uzbekistan | 1–1 | 3–2 | Friendly |
| 21. | 17 October 2024 | Dasharath Rangasala, Kathmandu, Nepal | Pakistan | 1–0 | 5–2 | 2024 SAFF Women's Championship |
| 22. | 17 October 2024 | Dasharath Rangasala, Kathmandu, Nepal | Pakistan | 4–0 | 5–2 | 2024 SAFF Women's Championship |
| 23. | 23 June 2025 | 700th Anniversary Stadium, Chiang Mai, Thailand | Mongolia | 12–0 | 13–0 | 2026 AFC Women's Asian Cup qualification |
| 24. | 25 May 2026 | Jawaharlal Nehru Stadium, Margao, India | Maldives | 4–0 | 11–0 | 2026 SAFF Women's Championship |

== Honours ==
India

- SAFF Women's Championship: 2016, 2019, 2026
- South Asian Games Gold medal: 2016, 2019

Sethu

- Indian Women's League: 2018–19

Gokulam Kerala

- Indian Women's League: 2021–22, 2022–23
- AFC Women's Club Championship: third place 2021

Sevinch Karshi

- Uzbekistan Women's League: 2022
- Uzbekistan Women's Cup: 2022

KRYPHSA

- Indian Women's League runner-up: 2019–20

Manipur

- Rajmata Jijabai Trophy: 2013–14, 2023–24

Individual

- AIFF Emerging Player of the Year: 2018−19
- Indian Women's League Emerging Player: 2017–18
- FPAI Indian Player of the Year (Woman): 2023

== See also ==
- List of Indian football players in foreign leagues
