= Pakpi Devi Yumlembam =

Indian footballer

Pakpi Devi
Personal information
- Full name: Pakpi Devi Yumlembam
- Date of birth: 1 February 2002 (age 24)
- Place of birth: Manipur, India
- Position: Defender

Team information
- Current team: Garhwal United

Senior career*
Years	Team	Apps	(Gls)
- KRYPHSA
- Gokulam Kerala
2021–2026	Kickstart		
2026–	Garhwal United		

International career
2018	India U18		
- * Club domestic league appearances and goals

Pakpi Devi Yumlembam (Meitei: Yumlembam Pakpi Devi, born 1 February 2002) is an Indian professional footballer from Manipur who plays as a defender for the Indian Women's League club Garhwal United. She has also represented India at the youth level internationally.

== Career ==
Devi made her junior national debut in the 2018 SAFF Under–18 Women's Championship. She represented India in the 2019 Turkish Women's Cup.

She was named in the 23 probables for the India women's national football team for the senior national camp held at Goa in September and October 2024. She played for Manipur in the Rajmata Jijabai Trophy in 2023. She joined Kickstart FC in 2021.

She started playing football with the local club KRYHPSA, and later played for Gokulam Kerala Football Club.
