= Margaret Devi Kshetrimayum =

Indian footballer

Margaret Devi
Personal information
- Full name: Margaret Devi Kshetrimayum
- Date of birth: 9 May 1996 (age 30)
- Place of birth: Kakching, Manipur, India
- Position: Forward

Team information
- Current team: East Bengal
- Number: 75

Senior career*
Years	Team	Apps	(Gls)
- Eastern Sporting Union
- Eves Soccer Club
- India Rush Soccer Club
- Baroda FA
–2021	Kickstart		
2022–2023	Eastern Sporting Union		
2023–	East Bengal		

International career
2011	India U16		
2013–2015	India U19		
2016–2018	India	1	(0)
- * Club domestic league appearances and goals

Margaret Devi Kshetrimayum (Meitei: Kshetrimayum Margaret Devi, born 9 May 1996) is an Indian professional footballer who plays as a forward for the Indian Women's League club East Bengal. She also played for the India national football team.

== Personal life ==
Margaret Devi hails from the town of Kakching and started playing football in 2006.

== Career ==
Margaret Devi was selected in the Indian national squad for the 2016 South Asian Games and made her senior debut against Bangladesh in the semi-finals. She was selected for the national squad for the 2020 Olympic qualifiers in 2018.

== Honours ==
India

- South Asian Games Gold medal: 2016

Kickstart

- Karnataka Women's League: 2019–20, 2020–21, 2021–22
