= Häfele Group =

Manufacturer

Häfele SE & Co KG
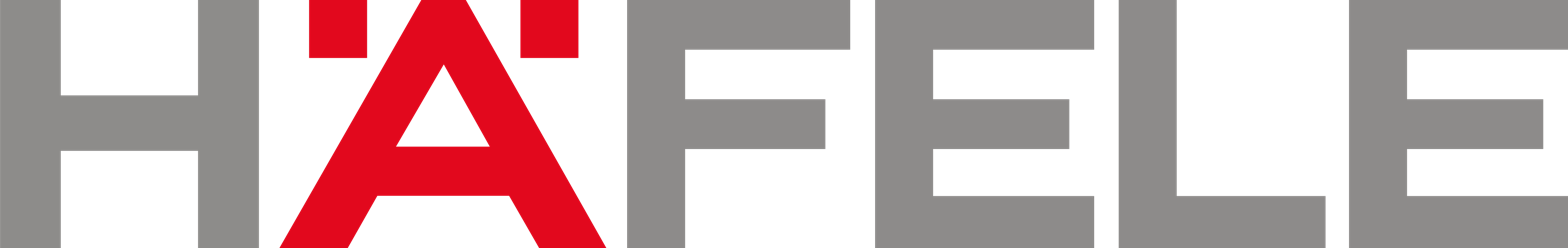
- ISIN: nicht vorhanden
- Founded: 1923
- Founder: Adolf Häfele
- Headquarters: Nagold, Germany
- Area served: Worldwide
- Key people: Gregor Riekena, CEO
- Revenue: €1,7 billion (2021)
- Number of employees: 8,000 (2021)
- Website: hafele.com.de

The Häfele Group is a German family enterprise that makes and supplies furniture fittings and architectural hardware. Its head office in Nagold. It has customers in more than 150 countries.

Häfele's furniture fittings (hinges, drawer systems, handles, connectors, ambient lighting), architectural hardware (door hardware and electronic locking systems), and other related fittings are designed for the furniture, building, and hardware supply industries. Häfele manufactures a range of products from ironing boards to door closers.

In the 2016 financial year, the Häfele group had a turnover of 1.311 billion Euros with 38 subsidiaries in 6 continents. In 2018, the turnover grew to 1.396 billion Euros and reached 1.7 billion Euros in 2021. The turnover share abroad was 80%. The company has 8,000 employees worldwide.

== History ==
=== Foundation Phase ===
On 1 December 1923, the merchant Adolf Häfele, together with Hermann Funk, founded the business "Products of the hardware and tool industry" in Aulendorf.

Four years later this became a sole proprietorship with Häfele as sole owner. A few months later, the company moved to Nagold, which was then the centre of Württemberg furniture production.

At that time Häfele had three employees, customers were mainly carpentries in the surrounding area. In order to guarantee fast delivery, a wholesale warehouse was set up.

=== Internationalization ===
The first exports to foreign countries were in 1933, in the same year the company was awarded the Golden Medal for the design of the exhibition stand at the Strasbourg Fair. Shortly before the end of the decade, the first furniture fittings catalogue appeared with a circulation of 20,000 copies, which was referred to as the "World Globe Catalogue" because of its title page.

In 1948, the Adolf Häfele company celebrated its 25th anniversary and the number of employees was 29. Four months later the company founder died. His nephew Walther Thierer took over the management. A major fire destroyed the administration and warehouse in 1950, and it was not until a year later that the company was able to move into its new premises.

In the following 30 years the company grew to up to 700 employees, with whom an annual turnover of over 150 million DM was achieved, and expanded its sphere of activity to 120 countries. Sales subsidiaries were founded in Switzerland, France, Great Britain, the USA and Australia. In addition, the company was distributed among four production companies in Germany.

At the beginning of the 1960s, computer-controlled shipping was introduced. At the beginning of the 70s, a dispatch center with a high-bay warehouse was built. By 1977, the area available for storage had doubled to 8,400 square meters; today, the company operates a central warehouse with over 50,000 items, some of which is fully automated.

After the death of Walter Thierer in 1982, Hans Nock, until then export manager, took over the management of the company. Until 2003 he managed the company, which during this time grew to 2900 employees with a turnover of 534 million euros, and the share of foreign business in this increased to around 70 percent.

As Hans Nock's successor, Sibylle Thierer has been the third generation of the family to run the company since 2003. According to the company, more than 160,000 customers are served in more than 150 countries.

In 2020, the company changed its legal form to "SE & Co KG".

=== Catalog ===
At the beginning of the 1970s, Walther Thierer developed a reference book for furniture fittings with 25,000 articles based on the model of his uncle's "World Globe Catalogue". In 1971 "Der Große Häfele" was published with a print run of 60,000 copies, followed two years later by editions in English, French and Spanish. A first catalogue for building and object fittings followed in 1981.

=== Production ===
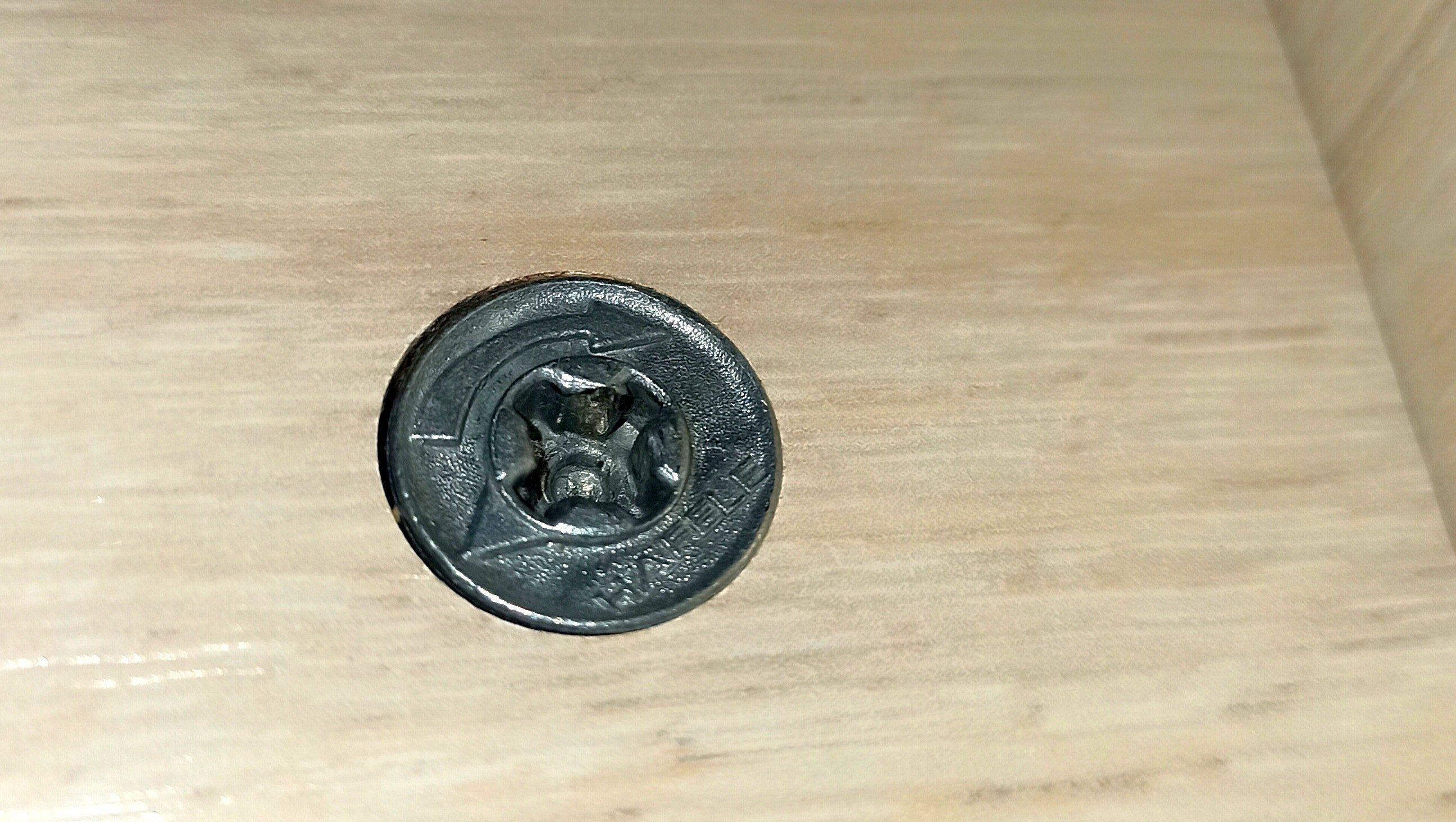
Minifix eccentric (furniture fittings) with the logo of the Häfele company

Häfele produces fittings in four plants in Germany, since 1983 also furniture connectors sold under the brand name "ixConnect", and since 2009 also lift fittings branded "Free" and sliding door fittings under the brand "Slido".

With effect from 1 September 2009, Häfele GmbH & Co KG together with Heinrich J. Kesseböhmer KG took over the lift fittings and sliding door fittings divisions of Huwil Werke GmbH and a production facility in Hungary re-branding the operation "FCC" of "Flap Competency Center" and the product line "Free".

== Company Structure ==
=== Sales offices ===
In addition to the headquarters in Nagold, there are ten sales offices in Germany. These are in Berlin (founded in 1995), Frankfurt am Main, Kaltenkirchen, Cologne (1991), Hanover, Munich (1985), Münster (2001), Naumburg (1990), Nuremberg and Stuttgart Airport (2012).

Abroad, there are sales offices in Dubai (since 1998), Lahti in Finland, Marousi in Greece, Hong Kong, Bolzano, Zagreb, Maia in Portugal (1999), the Hungarian capital Budapest, Jönköping in Sweden (1999) in Kruševac in Serbia, and Dar es Salaam in Tanzania (2019).

In addition to the existing shipping centre in Nagold's industrial area "Wolfsberg", a second warehouse and shipping center was opened in Lehrte near Hanover in October 2019. In 2021, conversion work began on the "Wolfsberg" for the fourth high-bay warehouse to reinforce the Nagold shipping center.

=== Subsidiaries ===
Häfele has subsidiaries in Kreuzlingen, Switzerland (since 1963), in Archdale, North Carolina, USA, since 1975, and in Rugby, Great Britain, since 1980. This was followed by the founding of companies in Dandenong, Australia (1982), and a year later in Burlington, Canada, and Taverny, France (1985). In 1986, further companies were established in Kilcoole, Ireland, and Lentate sul Seveso, Italy. In the following years, subsidiaries were established in Apeldoorn, Netherlands (1987), in Singapore (1988) and in Botany, New Zealand (1989).

Further expansion took place in the 1990s when, with a focus on the Asian region, subsidiaries were established in Shah Alam, Malaysia (1993), Yokohama, Japan (1994), Bangkok, Thailand (also 1994), Seoul, South Korea's capital, Manila, Philippines, and Serpong, Indonesia (all three in 1996).

Foundations continued in other continents as well, in Madrid, Spain (1997), Querétaro, Mexico, and Honeydew, South Africa (both 1997), and two in South America: Piraquara, Brazil (1998), and Buenos Aires, Argentina (1999). In the same year, Skive in Denmark was added, followed by Wugu Shiang in Taiwan in 2000 and Hof near Salzburg in Austria a year later. There has been a subsidiary in Długołęka, Poland, since 2002; Zele, Belgium, followed in 2003, as did Mumbai in India. In 2005, the Chinese capital Beijing and the Turkish city of Istanbul were added. After that, subsidiaries were established in the Russian capital Moscow (2006), the Vietnamese Ho Chi Minh City (2007), in Kulykiw in Ukraine (2009) and in Timisoara in Romania (2009). Häfele Adriatic in Slovenia followed as another foreign subsidiary (June 2018).

In February 2019, Häfele acquired the Stuttgart-based lighting specialist Nimbus Group. At the beginning of 2021, the Häfele Group added the online retailer for electrical household appliances Moebelplus GmbH & Co KG. This was followed in 2022 by the acquisition of the expert for smart networking of furniture and rooms: ThingOS.

=== Production sites ===
Through acquisitions, the company was joined in 1964 by Häfele Berlin GmbH & Co KG, focusing on furniture connectors and contract manufacturing, and Ulrich Lippert GmbH & Co. KG in Berlin in 1965, focusing on doorbell and mailbox systems. The latter was sold again in 2011. Since 1981, Anton Schneider GmbH & Co. KG in Kenzingen and Jettingen has belonged to Häfele since 1981, focusing on office systems and contract manufacturing. Furthermore, Sphinx Electronics GmbH & Co. KG in Kenzingen has been part of the company since 1998 (electronic locking systems are produced here) and Huwil Werke in Budapest, where hinged door and sliding door fittings are manufactured, has been part of the company since 2009.

== Sources and further reading ==
- Lovel, Jim (November 22, 2004). "Coyne Prepares to Build Business for Hafele." Ad Week. Accessed December 2011.
- Esler, Bill (May 26, 2011). "Hafele forms furniture hardware engineering unit." Woodworking Network. Accessed December 2011.
- (August 23, 2010.) "Hafele mulls franchise expansion." Franchise India. Accessed December 2011.
- (October 30, 2004.) "Design for living: the answer to fashion excess (but don't tell my husband)." The Telegraph. Accessed December 2011.
- (November 15, 2011.) "Loox lighting for the furniture market." Building Talk. Accessed December 2011.
- (February 7, 2011.) "Hafele tie-up." The Himalayan Times. Accessed December 2011.
- Adhar, Satya (October 4, 2007). "3i Infotech signs ORION deal with German brand Hafele." Thaindian News. Accessed December 2011.
- "Häfele offers quality ‘green’ products." Malaya Business Insight. Accessed December 2011.
- (February 15, 2011.) "Hafele aims for 20% revenue growth." Bangkok Post. Accessed December 2011.
- (June 1, 2010.) "Hafele India: Lighting the way." Hotelier India. Accessed December 2011.
- Thuy, Tuong (August 1, 2011). Managers go to see factories in supply chain. Saigon-gpdaily.com.vn. Accessed December 2011.
- "Hafele's Minifix production: full speed ahead". Wood & Wood Products. 100 (13). December 1995.
