= Football at the 2019 South Asian Games – Women's tournament =

2019 South Asian Games
Tournament details
- Host country: Nepal
- Dates: 3−10 December 2019
- Teams: 4 (from 1 confederation)
- Venue: 1 (in 1 host city)

Final positions
- Champions: India (3rd title)
- Runners-up: Nepal
- Third place: Maldives

Tournament statistics
- Matches played: 7
- Goals scored: 21 (3 per match)
- Attendance: 2,100 (300 per match)
- Top scorer(s): (India) Bala Devi (6 goals)

The Women's football tournament of the 2019 South Asian Games will be the 3rd edition of the tournament. It will be played at Pokhara Rangasala in Pokhara, Nepal, from 3 December to 10 December 2019.

India are defending champions.

== Venue ==
Pokhara
Pokhara Rangasala
Capacity: 10,000

== Participating nations ==
Country	Appearance	Previous best performance	FIFA ranking (28 November 2019)
India	3rd	Gold Medal (2010, 2016)	58
Maldives	2nd	Fourth-Place (2016)	140
Nepal (Host)	3rd	Silver Medal (2010, 2016)	100
Sri Lanka	3rd	Group Stage (2010, 2016)	138

== Fixtures and Results ==
All times are local, NPT (UTC+5:45).

=== Round Robin stage ===
It is being played on round-robin format. The top two teams will be play in the final. The team finishing third in the group stage will be awarded with bronze medal.

Pos	Team	Pld	W	D	L	GF	GA	GD	Pts	Qualification
1	India	3	3	0	0	12	0	+12	9	Advance to Final
2	Nepal (H)	3	2	0	1	4	1	+3	6	Advance to Final
3	Maldives	3	1	0	2	2	9	−7	3	
4	Sri Lanka	3	0	0	3	1	9	−8	0	

Source: Futbol24
Rules for classification: 1) points; 2) goal difference; 3) goals scored; 4) head-to-head result.
(H) Hosts

3 December 2019
10:00

Nepal	1−0	Sri Lanka
Limbu 86'	Report

Pokhara Rangasala, Pokhara
Attendance: 500
3 December 2019
14:00

India	5−0	Maldives
Grace 5'; B. Devi 24', 33'; Kalyan 87'; Tudu 88'	Report

Pokhara Rangasala, Pokhara
Attendance: 150

5 December 2019
10:00

Sri Lanka	0−6	India
	Report	Grace 7'; Ranganathan 10', 25'; R. Devi 18', 88'; B. Devi 90+1'

Pokhara Rangasala, Pokhara
Attendance: 150
5 December 2019
14:00

Maldives	0−3	Nepal
	Report	Bhandari 20', 25', 90+1'

Pokhara Rangasala, Pokhara
Attendance: 600

7 December 2019
10:00

Maldives	2−1	Sri Lanka
S. Aminath 37'; F. Saina 54'	Report	C. Ekanayake 85'

Pokhara Rangasala, Pokhara
Attendance: 200
7 December 2019
14:00

India	1−0	Nepal
B. Devi 18'	Report

Pokhara Rangasala, Pokhara
Attendance: 400

=== Gold medal match ===
9 December 2019
14:00

India	2−0	Nepal
B. Devi 18', 56'	Report

Pokhara Rangasala, Pokhara
Attendance: 10,000+
Referee: Sudish Kumar Pandey (Nepal)

== Goalscorers ==
There have been 21 goals scored in 7 matches, for an average of 3 goals per match.

6 goals

- (India) Bala Devi

3 goals

- (Nepal) Sabitra Bhandari

2 goals

- (India) Grace Dangmei
- (India) Ratanbala Devi
- (India) Sandhiya Ranganathan

1 goal

- (India) Manisha Kalyan
- (India) Jabamani Tudu
- (Nepal) Saru Limbu
- (Sri Lanka) Chalani Ekanayake
- (Maldives) Fathimath Saina
- (Maldives) Aminath Shamila

== Final results ==
Pos	Team	Pld	W	D	L	GF	GA	GD	Pts	Result
1	India	4	4	0	0	14	0	+14	12	Gold Medal
2	Nepal	4	2	0	2	4	3	+1	6	Silver Medal
3	Maldives	3	1	0	2	2	9	−7	3	Bronze Medal
4	Sri Lanka	3	0	0	3	1	9	−8	0	

Source: Futbol24
Rules for classification: 1) points; 2) goal difference; 3) goals scored; 4) head-to-head result.
