= Dular Marandi =

Indian footballer

Personal information
- Date of birth: 15 July 1995 (age 31)
- Place of birth: Kadokhicha, Dumka, Jharkhand, India
- Position: Forward

Team information
- Current team: SSB Women

Youth career
- SAI, Hazaribagh

Senior career*
Years	Team	Apps	(Gls)
2017–	SSB Women		

International career
- India
- * Club domestic league appearances and goals

Dular Marandi (born 15 July 1995) is an Indian professional footballer from Jharkhand, who plays as a forward for SSB Women Football Club in the Indian Women's League and represents the India women's national football team. She works with the Border Security Force and is stationed at Siliguri.

== Early life ==
Dular hails from Kadokhicha village, Dumka district, one of the most backward districts of India in Jharkhand. Her elder sister took care of her during the childhood and encouraged her to play football. Her brother had to stop education due to financial difficulties. Dular was spotted by a Priest from the Dumka, who selected her for missionary football team and later joined her in the SAI Girls Football Training Centre in Hazaribagh. In 2009, when she was 13, her mother died and a year later, her brother too died. In 2015, she lost her father. Thanks to her sports talent, in 2017 she was employed by Shastra Seema Bal (BSF). She trains under coach Juliet Miranda at SSB. She has two younger brothers.

== Career ==
- 2022: She captained the SSB team that won the Calcutta Women's Football League for Kanyashree Cup, the oldest football tournament for women in India. She was awarded the 'Best Player of the Tournament'.
- 2022: She represented SSB in the Indian Women's League and scored nine goals
- 2022: Friendly match in Sweden.

== Honours ==
SSB Women

- Calcutta Women's Football League: 2020–21, 2021–22
