= 2019 SAFF Women's Championship =

२०१९ साफ महिला च्याम्पियनसिप

Tournament details
- Host country: Nepal
- Dates: 12–22 March
- Teams: 6
- Venue: 1 (in 1 host city)

Final positions
- Champions: India (5th title)
- Runners-up: Nepal

Tournament statistics
- Matches played: 9
- Goals scored: 33 (3.67 per match)
- Attendance: 30,200 (3,356 per match)
- Top scorer(s): (India) Indumathi Kathiresan (Nepal) Sabitra Bhandari (4 goals each)
- Best player: (India) Grace Dangmei
- Fair play award: Bangladesh

The 2019 SAFF Women's Championship was the 5th edition of the SAFF Women's Championship, the biennial international women's football championship contested by the national teams of the South Asian Football Federation (SAFF). Initially, scheduled from 17 to 26 December 2018 in Sri Lanka, the competition was rescheduled, as Sri Lanka withdrew as hosts. Afterwards, it was scheduled to be held in 2019 from 12 to 22 March and to be hosted by Nepal.

India is the current champions having defeated Nepal by 3–1 goals on 22 March 2019 in the final.

== Participating teams ==
Defending champions India and Bangladesh were pitted in Group B and Group A respectively. In Group A, Nepal who finished second in the first three editions of the tournament were drawn with 2016 runners-up Bangladesh, Bhutan and Pakistan and in Group B, along with India, Maldives and Sri Lanka are placed. Afghanistan did not participate in this edition, though they played in the 2016 edition despite changing their sub-confederation from SAFF to CAFF in 2014. Later, Pakistan withdrew from the tournament.

Country	Appearance	Previous best performance	FIFA ranking Dec 2018
India	5th	Champions (2010, 2012, 2014, 2016, 2019)	62
Nepal (Host)	5th	Runners-up (2010, 2012, 2014, 2019)	108
Bangladesh	5th	Runners-up (2016)	125
Maldives	5th	Semi-finals (2016)	132
Sri Lanka	5th	Semi-finals (2012, 2014)	n/a
Bhutan	5th	Group stage (2010,2012,2014,2016)	n/a

== Venue ==
The Sahid Rangsala in Biratnagar, Province No. 1, Nepal serves as the host venue for the SAFF Women's Championship.

Biratnagar	Biratnagar is located in Nepal
Sahid Rangsala	Biratnagar is located in Nepal
Capacity: 10,000	Biratnagar is located in Nepal

== Group stage ==
The group stage draw for the tournament was held on 13 November 2018 at the South Asian Football Federation head office in Dhaka.

- All matches were played at Sahid Rangsala, Biratnagar, Nepal.
- Times listed are UTC+05:45.

Key to colours in group tables
Group winners and runners-up advance to the semi-finals

=== Group A ===
Pos	Team	Pld	W	D	L	GF	GA	GD	Pts	Status
1	Nepal (H)	2	2	0	0	6	0	+6	6	Qualified for Knockout stage
2	Bangladesh	2	1	0	1	2	3	−1	3	Qualified for Knockout stage
3	Bhutan	2	0	0	2	0	5	−5	0	

Updated to match(es) played on 16 March 2019. Source: SAFF
(H) Hosts
12 March 2019
15:00

Nepal	3–0	Bhutan
Manjali 13'; Sabitra 16'; Niru 54'	SAFF ANFA

Sahid Rangsala, Biratnagar
Attendance: 2,798
Referee: Mizanur Rahman (Bangladesh)

14 March 2019
15:00

Bhutan	0–2	Bangladesh
	SAFF BFF	Mishrat 47'; Sabina 85'

Sahid Rangsala, Biratnagar
Attendance: 2,379
Referee: Ashish Chowdhury (India)

16 March 2019
15:00

Bangladesh	0–3	Nepal
	Report	Parvin 6' (o.g.); Sabitra 23'; Manjali 28'

Sahid Rangsala, Biratnagar
Attendance: 4,687
Referee: Sanjay Chakrabarty (India)

=== Group B ===
Pos	Team	Pld	W	D	L	GF	GA	GD	Pts	Status
1	India	2	2	0	0	11	0	+11	6	Qualified for Knockout stage
2	Sri Lanka	2	1	0	1	2	5	−3	3	Qualified for Knockout stage
3	Maldives	2	0	0	2	0	8	−8	0	

Updated to match(es) played on 17 March 2019. Source: SAFF
13 March 2019
15:00

India	6–0	Maldives
Sanju 27', 89'; Grace 8'; Sandhiya 13'; Indumathi 23'; Ratanbala 45+4'	SAFF AIFF

Sahid Rangsala, Biratnagar
Attendance: 1,813
Referee: Ashmita Manandhar (Nepal)

15 March 2019
15:00

Maldives	0–2	Sri Lanka
	SAFF ANFA	Chalini 40', 50'

Sahid Rangsala, Biratnagar
Attendance: 1,464
Referee: Dulal Mridha (Bangladesh)

17 March 2019
15:00

Sri Lanka	0–5	India
	SAFF AIFF	Grace 4'; Sandhiya 7'; Indumathi 36'; Sangita 45'; Ratanbala 47'

Sahid Rangsala, Biratnagar
Attendance: 1,684
Referee: Mizanur Rahman (Bangladesh)

== Knockout stage ==
- Times listed are UTC+05:45.

Semi-finals
20 March – Biratnagar
Nepal	4
Sri Lanka	0
20 March – Biratnagar
India	4
Bangladesh	0

Final
22 March – Biratnagar
Nepal	1
India	3

=== Semi-finals ===
20 March 2019
11:00

Nepal	4–0	Sri Lanka
Magar 42'; Anita 73'; Bhandari 82'; Rekha 86'	Report

Sahid Rangsala, Biratnagar
Attendance: 4,112
Referee: Pratap Singh (India)
20 March 2019
15:00

India	4–0	Bangladesh
Dalima 18'; Indumathi 22', 37'; Manisha 90+3'	Report

Sahid Rangsala, Biratnagar
Attendance: 1,263
Referee: Mohommed Nizam (Sri Lanka)

== Final ==
22 March 2019
15:00

Nepal	1–3	India
Bhandari 33'	Report	Chhibber 26'; Grace 63'; Tamang 78'

Sahid Rangsala, Biratnagar
Attendance: 10,000
Referee: Mohammed Manir Dhali (Bangladesh)

== Goalscorers ==
There were 33 goals scored in 9 matches, for an average of 3.67 goals per match.

4 goals

- (India) Indumathi Kathiresan
- (Nepal) Sabitra Bhandari

3 goals

- (India) Grace Dangmei

2 goals

- (India) Dalima Chhibber
- (India) Sandhiya Ranganathan
- (India) Sanju Yadav
- (India) Nongmaithem Ratanbala Devi
- (Nepal) Manjali Kumari Yonjan
- (Sri Lanka) Chalani Kumari Ekanayake

1 goal

- (Bangladesh) Mishrat Jahan Moushumi
- (Bangladesh) Sabina Khatun
- (India) Sangita Basfore
- (India) Manisha
- (India) Anju Tamang
- (Nepal) Niru Thapa
- (Nepal) Anita Basnet
- (Nepal) Rekha Poudel
- (Nepal) Punam Jargha Magar

1 own goal

- (Bangladesh) Masura Parvin (against Nepal)
