= Mariyammal Balamurugan =

Indian footballer

Personal information
- Date of birth: 14 April 2003 (age 23)
- Place of birth: Salem, Tamil Nadu, India
- Position: Midfielder

Team information
- Current team: Kickstart
- Number: 34

Senior career*
Years	Team	Apps	(Gls)
- Sethu
2022–2023	Kickstart		
2023–2024	East Bengal		
2024–	Kickstart		

International career^{‡}
2020	India U17		
2018–2021	India U20		
2021–	India	3	(0)
- * Club domestic league appearances and goals ‡ National team caps and goals as of 24 September 2023

Mariyammal Balamurugan (born 14 April 2003) is an Indian professional footballer from Tamil Nadu, who plays as a midfielder for Kickstart in the Indian Women's League and the India women's national football team. She has also played for Sethu FC and East Bengal.

== Early life ==
Mariyammal hails from Salem district, Tamil Nadu and hails from a family of farmers. She started playing football at a young age and was scouted from the 2018 Khelo Indian Games.

== Career ==
Mariyammal has represented India in the U16 and U19 AFC qualifiers. She made her senior international debut in the 2021 International Women's Football Tournament of Manaus against Brazil. In January 2022, she was named in the Indian team to play AFC Women's Asian Cup.

== Honours ==
Kickstart

- Karnataka Women's League: 2023–24
