= Apurna Narzary =

Indian footballer (born 2004)

Personal information
- Full name: Apurna Narzary
- Date of birth: 8 January 2004 (age 22)
- Place of birth: Kokrajhar, Assam, India
- Position: Forward

Team information
- Current team: Sethu
- Number: 24

Senior career*
Years	Team	Apps	(Gls)
- Indian Arrows Women
2022	Kerala Blasters		
2023–2024	Sethu		
2024–2026	Sreebhumi		
2026–	Sethu		

International career
2022–	India U20	6	(4)
2022–	India	5	(0)
- * Club domestic league appearances and goals

Apurna Narzary (born 8 January 2004) is an Indian professional footballer who plays as a forward for the Indian Women's League club Sethu and the India national team.

== Club career ==
Apurna started her senior career with Indian Arrows and played for them in the Indian Women's League. She Scored six goals in seven appearances for the Arrows and two Hero of the Match awards. She also scored a hat-trick in a 4–0 win against Odisha Police. In 2022, she was signed by Kerala Blasters as a part of their newly launched women's team.

== International career ==
Apurna debuted for India at the junior level in 2022, after represented the India U-18 team at the 2022 SAFF U-18 Women's Championship. In September 2022, she was included in the final 23 squad of Indian team to play in the 2022 SAFF Women's Championship.
