= Sahid Rangasala =

Coordinates: 26.4626°N 87.2859°E

- सहिद रंगशाला
- Interactive map of Sahid Rangasala
- Full name: Sahid Rangasala Stadium
- Location: Biratnagar, Morang, Nepal
- Owner: Morang Football Association
- Operator: Morang Football Association
- Capacity: 15,000
- Surface: grass

Construction
- Opened: 1969
- Renovated: 2019

Tenant
- Biratnagar City F.C.

Sahid Rangasala (Nepali: सहिद रंगशाला) is a multi-purpose stadium in Biratnagar, Koshi Province, Nepal. It can accommodate 15,000 spectators. It was renovated for hosting the SAFF Women's Championship in 2019. It is the home stadium for Morang XI and Biratnagar City football clubs.

== History ==
The stadium served as the venue for Mahendra Gold Cup (presently Birat Gold Cup) for the first time in 1961 A.D. It held the opening ceremony of the Seventh National Games by the president of Nepal, Bidhya Devi Bhandari. In preparation of the 2019 SAFF Women's Championship, Biratnagar metropolitan city invested NRs. 10 million into the renovation of the stadium.

== Hosted events ==
- Seventh National Games (2016)
- 2019 SAFF Women's Championship
- Birat Gold Cup
- regular matches of Nepal National League
- Final Stage Games of Province 1 League Qualifier
