= 2026 Arunachal League =

Indrajit Namchoom Arunachal League
- Season: 2026
- Dates: 10 October 2026 – TBD
- Teams: 10
- Matches: 19
- Goals: 59 (3.11 per match)
- All statistics correct as of 25 October 2026.

The 2026 Arunachal League, also known as 2026 Indrajit Namchoom Arunachal League (INAL), is the fourth season of the Indrajit Namchoom Arunachal League, the top state division of football in the Indian state of Arunachal Pradesh. The league is organised by the Arunachal Pradesh Football Association.

== Clubs ==
Locations of Indrajit Namchoom Arunachal League clubs

INAL participants
| Team | Regions |
|---|---|
| Capital Complex | Itanagar Capital Complex, Papum Pare |
| Dibang United | Dibang Valley, Lower Dibang Valley |
| Kameng United | East Kameng, Pakke-Kessang |
| Monyul | Bichom, West Kameng, Tawang |
| Namsai | Namsai, Anjaw, Lohit |
| Patkai United | Tirap, Longding, Changlang |
| Siang Warriors | Upper Siang, Siang, East Siang, Shi Yomi |
| Subansiri United | Upper Subansiri, Kamle, Keyi Panyor, Lower Subansiri |
| United Kurung | Kurung Kumey, Kra Daadi |
| Xiga United | West Siang, Lepa Rada, Lower Siang |

== League table ==
| Pos | Team | Pld | W | D | L | GF | GA | GD | Pts | Qualification |
|---|---|---|---|---|---|---|---|---|---|---|
| 1 | Monyul | 4 | 3 | 0 | 1 | 9 | 3 | +6 | 9 | Advanced to Second Phase |
| 2 | Xiga United | 4 | 2 | 1 | 1 | 6 | 2 | +4 | 7 | Advanced to Second Phase |
| 3 | Namsai | 4 | 2 | 1 | 1 | 7 | 5 | +2 | 7 | Advanced to Second Phase |
| 4 | Dibang United | 3 | 2 | 1 | 0 | 5 | 3 | +2 | 7 | Advanced to Second Phase |
| 5 | United Kurung | 4 | 2 | 0 | 2 | 10 | 7 | +3 | 6 | Advanced to Second Phase |
| 6 | Subansiri United | 3 | 1 | 2 | 0 | 4 | 2 | +2 | 5 | Advanced to Second Phase |
| 7 | Patkai United | 4 | 1 | 2 | 1 | 5 | 6 | −1 | 5 | Advanced to Second Phase |
| 8 | Kameng United | 3 | 1 | 1 | 1 | 5 | 3 | +2 | 4 | Advanced to Second Phase |
| 9 | Capital Complex | 4 | 1 | 0 | 3 | 6 | 5 | +1 | 3 | |
| 10 | Siang Warriors | 5 | 0 | 0 | 5 | 2 | 23 | −21 | 0 | |

Updated to match(es) played on 25 October 2026. Source: Arunachal League

== See also ==
- 2026–27 Indian State Leagues
