= 2025–26 Indian State Leagues =

2025–26 season in the state football leagues of India

State leagues in India
- Season: 2025–26
- Dates: 25 June 2025 – 30 June 2026
- Promoted: I-League 3

The 2025–26 Indian State Leagues season represents the fifth tier of the Indian football league system, a series of state-level football leagues played as qualifiers to determine teams for the 2026–27 I-League 3.

== Overview ==
Zone	State	League	Teams	League dates	Duration (months)	Champions	Runners-up	I-League 3 eligibility
North	Delhi	2025–26 Delhi Premier League	14	26 December 2025–31 May 2026	5	Garhwal Heroes	Royal Rangers	Garhwal Heroes
North	Punjab	2025–26 Punjab State Super League	10	1 August–28 December 2025	5	Punjab FC	Sher-e-Punjab	Sher-e-Punjab
North	Uttarakhand	2025-26 Uttarakhand State Football League	8	10 May–6 June 2026	1	Corbett FC	Amenity FA	Corbett FC
North	Rajasthan	2025–26 R-League A Division	7	20 March–30 April 2026	1	Zinc FA	Jaipur City	Zinc FA
Northeast
Northeast	Assam	2025 Assam State Premier League						
Northeast	Arunachal Pradesh	2025 Arunachal League	10	4 October–8 November 2025	1	Capital Complex	Subansiri United	Capital Complex
Northeast	Manipur	2025–26 Manipur State League	24	7 December 2025–5 April 2026	4	Eastern Sporting Union	NFMA Salam	Eastern Sporting Union
Northeast	Manipur	2025–26 Manipur Premier League	15	5 October 2025–9 January 2026	3	Southern Sporting Union	Anouba Imagi Mangal	Southern Sporting Union
Northeast	Mizoram	2025 Mizoram Premier League	8	25 August–1 November 2025	2.5	Chanmari	Aizawl	MLS FC
Northeast	Sikkim	2026 Sikkim Premier League	8	5 April–18 May 2026	1.5	Siniolchu FC	Singling SC	Siniolchu
Northeast	Nagaland	2026 Nagaland League						
Northeast	Meghalaya	2026 Meghalaya State League	33	15 April–5 June 2026	1.5	Nongkseh SCC	Langsning	Nongkseh SCC
East
East	Odisha	2025 FAO League						
East	West Bengal (Kolkata)	2025 CFL Premier Division	26	25 June–22 September 2025	3	East Bengal	United SC	Suruchi Sangha
East	Chhattisgarh	2025 Chhattisgarh Football League						
West	Goa	2025–26 Goa Professional League	15	18 September 2025–30 April 2026	7	SC De Goa	Dempo SC	Clube de Salgaocar
West	Gujarat	2025–26 Gujarat Championship	10	8 Nov 2025–15 Feb 2026	3.5	Charutkar Vidhya Mandal	Reserve Bank of India	Charutkar Vidhya Mandal
West	Madhya Pradesh	2025–26 Madhya Pradesh Premier League	8	27 September 2025–18 January 2026	4	Lakecity FC	Build Up Sport	Lakecity FC
West	Maharashtra	2025–26 Mumbai Premier League	20	1 December 2025–22 May 2026	6	Maharashtra Oranje	MYJ-GMSC	—N/a
West	Maharashtra	2026 Maharashtra Football League	10	7 March–20 April 2026	1	Game of Goals	India On Track	Game of Goals
South	Karnataka (Bengaluru)	2025 Bangalore Super Division	10	28 July–24 August 2025	1	Kickstart	Misaka	Kickstart
South	Andhra Pradesh	2026 AP Super Cup	8	28 January–4 February 2026	8 days	Godavari FC	Coramandal FC	Godavari
South	Telangana	2025-26 Telangana A Division Rahim League	14	7 June–7 October 2025	4	Sreenidi Deccan B	AGORC	
South	Kerala	2026 Kerala Premier League	14	8 March 2026–31 May 2026	3	Gokulam Kerala B	Calicut	Calicut

== Northeastern leagues ==
=== Arunachal Pradesh ===
League stages
Pos	Team	Pld	W	D	L	GF	GA	GD	Pts	Qualification
1	Capital Complex	9	8	0	1	34	11	+23	24	Advanced to Qualifier 1
2	Siang Warriors	9	6	1	2	16	14	+2	19	Advanced to Qualifier 1
3	Xiga United	9	5	1	3	23	12	+11	16	Advanced to Eliminator
4	Subansiri United	9	5	1	3	13	6	+7	16	Advanced to Eliminator
5	Monyul	9	4	2	3	19	16	+3	14	
6	Namsai	9	4	2	3	13	11	+2	14	
7	Patkai United	9	3	1	5	11	17	−6	10	
8	United Kurung	9	3	0	6	13	23	−10	9	
9	Kameng United	9	2	1	6	7	22	−15	7	
10	Dibang United	9	0	1	8	8	25	−17	1	

Source: Arunachal League

Qualifier 1
2 November 2025
1	Capital Complex	2
2	Siang Warriors	1
Eliminator
3 November 2025
3	Xiga United	1 (1)
4	Subansiri United (p)	1 (3)

Qualifier 2
5 November 2025
2	Siang Warriors	3 (5)
4	Subansiri United (p)	3 (6)

Final
8 November 2025
1	Capital Complex	3
4	Subansiri United	0

=== Mizoram ===
League stages
Pos	Team	Pld	W	D	L	GF	GA	GD	Pts	Qualification or relegation
1	Aizawl^{IFL}	14	12	2	0	40	11	+29	38	Advance to Semi-finals
2	Chanmari^{IFL} (C)	14	9	3	2	32	10	+22	30	Advance to Semi-finals
3	MLS (E)	14	6	3	5	22	20	+2	21	Advance to Semi-finals
4	Dinthar	14	5	5	4	29	32	−3	20	Advance to Semi-finals
5	Saikhamakawn	14	4	6	4	28	25	+3	18	
6	Mizoram Police	14	3	4	7	19	34	−15	13	
7	Kanan	14	3	4	7	21	30	−9	13	MPL Playoff
8	SYS (R)	14	0	1	13	6	35	−29	1	Relegation to the Mizoram First Division

Source: Away End
Rules for classification: 1) Points; 2) Head-to-head points; 3) Goal difference
(C) Champions;
(E) Eligible for I-League 3;
(R) Relegated

Semi-Finals
1	Aizawl	2	2	4
4	Dinthar FC	0	1	1
2	Chanmari	2	3	5
3	MLS FC	0	1	1

Finals
1	Aizawl	0
2	Chanmari	1

=== Manipur ===
Pos.	Team	P	W	D	L	Pts.	GF	GA	GD	Status
1	Southern Sporting Union	14	11	2	1	35	22	7	+15	Champions & Promoted to IL3
2	Anouba Imagi Mangal	14	10	2	2	32	31	14	+17	
3	United Chandel	14	8	3	3	27	30	14	+16	
4	Sagolband United	14	8	0	6	24	30	12	+18	
5	Athletic Brother's Association	14	7	2	5	23	23	15	+8	
6	Social SC	14	6	4	4	22	23	22	+1	
7	Mayang Imphal United	14	7	1	6	22	20	21	–1	
8	Young Physique’s Union	14	5	5	4	20	14	8	+6	
9	Rising Athletic Union	14	5	4	5	19	23	23	0	
10	Asufii FA	14	4	6	4	18	18	18	0	
11	Sang-Gai Heroes	14	5	2	7	17	21	18	+3	
12	AMOFA	14	5	1	8	16	22	26	–4	
13	Kshetri Iril Mapal YC	14	3	2	9	11	17	22	–5	
14	Imphal Youth FC	14	2	3	9	9	8	32	–24	
15	Angtha FC	14	0	1	13	1	13	63	–50	

Source: The Away End

== Northern leagues ==
=== Delhi ===
Super 5 stage
Pos	Team	Pld	W	D	L	GF	GA	GD	Pts	Qualification
1	Garhwal Heroes (C)	4	3	1	0	9	2	+7	10	Champions and Qualification for I-League 3 (Note: If the top teams are already playing in national leagues, then the next highest ranked team(s) would be eligible for I-League 3.)
2	Royal Rangers	4	2	1	1	5	3	+2	7	
3	Garhwal Diamonds	4	1	2	1	2	5	−3	5	
4	Friends United	4	1	1	2	5	6	−1	4	
5	CISF Protectors	4	0	1	3	2	7	−5	1	

Source: The Away End
Rules for classification: 1) points; 2) head-to-head points; 3) head-to-head goal difference; 4) head-to-head goals scored; 5) goal difference; 6) number of goals scored; 7) fair play ranking; 8) drawing of lots
(C) Champions

=== Punjab ===
Pos	Team	Pld	W	D	L	GF	GA	GD	Pts	Qualification	RGP	SPS	RCF	BSF	DFC	NFC	IFC	PP	OJS	YFC
1	Punjab FC (C)	18	12	3	3	32	13	+19	39	Champions		2–3	1–0	3–0	1–3	4–0	0–0	1–0	2–0	3–0
2	Sher-e-Punjab SC (Q)	18	10	4	4	36	27	+9	34	Qualification for I-League 3 (Note: If the top teams are already playing in national leagues, then the next highest ranked team(s) would be eligible for I-League 3.)	0–0		0–0	1–1	4–3	1–1	3–1	6–3	3–2	4–1
3	RCF FC	18	7	8	3	28	19	+9	29		2–2	4–0		2–0	2–2	0–0	3–2	0–0	1–3	0–0
4	BSF FC	18	9	2	7	25	23	+2	29		0–2	3–1	2–1		1–2	0–2	0–1	3–0	1–2	3–1
5	Dalbir FA	18	7	5	6	25	23	+2	26		0–1	1–2	0–3	3–1		0–0	2–1	0–0	0–1	1–0
6	Namdhari FC	18	7	4	7	26	21	+5	25		2–0	1–3	0–1	0–1	1–1		1–2	2–0	5–1	5–1
7	International FC	18	7	3	8	22	22	0	24		0–2	2–1	0–0	1–2	3–0	1–2		1–0	2–0	3–0
8	Punjab Police	18	6	5	7	19	26	−7	23		1–2	2–1	2–2	0–0	0–3	2–1	2–1		2–1	1–0
9	Olympian Jarnail FA (R)	18	4	3	11	25	35	−10	15	Relegation to Punjab State 2nd Division	2–3	0–1	3–4	2–3	1–1	3–2	1–1	1–1		3–1
10	Young FC (R)	18	2	1	15	12	41	−29	7	Relegation to Punjab State 2nd Division	0–3	0–2	2–3	0–3	1–3	0–1	3–0	1–3	1–0	

Source: The Away End
Legend: Blue = home team win; Yellow = draw; Red = away team win.
Rules for classification: 1) points; 2) head-to-head points; 3) head-to-head goal difference; 4) head-to-head goals scored; 5) goal difference; 6) number of goals scored; 7) fair play ranking; 8) drawing of lots
(C) Champions; (Q) Qualified for the phase indicated; (R) Relegated

=== Rajasthan ===
Pos.	Team	P	W	D	L	Pts.	GF	GA	GD	Status
1	Zinc FA	12	10	1	1	31	39	6	+33	Champions & Promoted to IL3
2	Jaipur City	12	8	1	3	25	35	16	+19	
3	Brothers United	12	7	2	3	23	28	19	+9	
4	Sunrise Sirohi	12	5	3	4	18	32	25	+7	
5	ASL	12	5	2	5	17	20	18	+2	
6	Jerthi FC	12	2	0	10	6	21	56	–35	
7	Rihan FA	12	0	1	11	1	6	41	–35	Relegated to R-League B Division

Source: The Away End

== Eastern leagues ==
=== West Bengal ===
Super Six
Pos	Team	Pld	W	D	L	GF	GA	GD	Pts	Qualification
1	East Bengal^{(ISL)} (C)	3	3	0	0	8	2	+6	9	Champions
2	United SC^{(IL2)}	3	1	1	1	5	4	+1	4	
3	Suruchi Sangha (Q)	3	1	1	1	5	6	−1	4	Eligible for I-League 3 (Note: If the top teams are already playing in national leagues, then the next highest ranked team(s) would be eligible for I-League 3.)
4	Diamond Harbour^{(IL)}	3	1	0	2	5	5	0	3	
5	United Kolkata (Q)	3	1	0	2	5	6	−1	3	Eligible for I-League 3 (Note: If the top teams are already playing in national leagues, then the next highest ranked team(s) would be eligible for I-League 3.)
6	Calcutta Customs	3	1	0	2	2	7	−5	3	

Source: The Away End
Rules for classification: 1) points; 2) head-to-head points; 3) head-to-head goal difference; 4) goal difference; 5) number of goals scored; 6) drawing of lots
(C) Champions;
(Q) Qualified for the phase indicated

== Western leagues ==
=== Goa ===
Super League (Phase 2)

Pos	Team	Pld	W	D	L	GF	GA	GD	Pts	Qualification
1	Sporting Goa^{IL2}	21	14	5	2	44	13	+31	47	Champions
2	Dempo^{IFL}	21	12	8	1	44	21	+23	44	
3	Salgaocar^{IL3}	21	12	7	2	41	22	+19	43	Eligible for I-League 3
4	FC Goa B^{ISL}	21	12	3	6	39	23	+16	39	
5	Geno SC	21	10	4	7	35	25	+10	34	
6	Calangute	21	9	5	7	36	31	+5	32	
7	SESA	21	7	6	8	19	20	−1	27	
8	Chapora YS	21	6	1	14	29	50	−21	19	

Source: Goa Professional League Official The Away End - Goa Pro League
Rules for classification: 1) points; 2) goal difference; 3) number of goals scored

=== Gujarat ===
==== Qualification Round ====
Group A
Group B

Pos.	Team	P	W	D	L	GF	GA	GD	Pts.	Qualification
1	Dwivedi Brothers	4	4	0	0	23	2	+21	12	League stage
2	Savvy Swaraaj FC	4	2	0	2	16	8	+8	6	Play-off
3	BSPFA Surat	4	2	0	2	15	8	+7	6	
4	Vadodara Wanderers	4	2	0	2	10	6	+4	6	
5	Chandkhera FC	4	0	0	4	2	42	–40	0	

Source: GSFA — Facebook

Pos.	Team	P	W	D	L	GF	GA	GD	Pts.	Qualification
1	Gujarat Police	4	4	0	0	9	0	+9	12	League stage
2	Master FC	4	3	0	1	12	5	+7	9	Play-off
3	Kickjack FC	4	2	0	2	5	8	–3	6	
4	SAG FA	4	1	0	3	1	4	–3	3	
5	Xaviers United	4	0	0	4	4	14	–10	0	

Source: GSFA — Facebook

Promotion play-off match
Savvy Swaraaj FC 0–3 Master FC

==== League stage ====
Pos.	Team	P	W	D	L	Pts.	GF	GA	GD	Status
1	Charutar Vidya Mandal	18	13	3	2	42	53	16	+37	Champions & Eligible for IL3
2	RBI	18	10	6	2	36	38	18	+20	
3	Income Tax SRC	18	8	6	4	30	21	24	–3	
4	ARA FC	18	9	2	7	29	36	23	+13	
5	Karnavati FC	18	7	4	7	25	26	29	–3	
6	Dwivedi Brothers	18	7	2	9	23	33	36	–3	
7	Suryavanshi FC	18	6	4	8	22	26	31	–5	
8	Godhra FC	18	5	4	9	19	22	32	–10	
9	Gujarat Police	18	4	3	11	15	21	32	–11	Relegated to GSFA Championship Qualifiers
10	Master FC	18	2	4	12	10	12	47	–35	Relegated to GSFA Championship Qualifiers

Source: The Away End

=== Maharashtra ===
League table
Pos	Team	Pld	W	D	L	GF	GA	GD	Pts	Qualification
1	Game Of Goals	14	11	2	1	39	10	+29	35	Champions and 2026–27 I-League 3
2	India On Track	14	10	3	1	50	10	+40	33	
3	Hope United	14	8	3	3	41	9	+32	27	
4	Snigmay Pune	14	6	2	6	27	24	+3	20	
5	AIYFA Skyhawks	14	5	4	5	19	23	−4	19	
6	Kalyan East	14	5	1	8	23	25	−2	16	
7	Nashik United	9	3	1	5	20	19	+1	10	
8	Firodia Shivajians	9	2	2	5	10	28	−18	8	
9	Mumbay FC^{IL3}	9	1	0	8	4	49	−45	3	
10	Magic Made Soccer	9	0	0	9	2	38	−36	0	

Source: The Away End Instagram Football Counter WIFA
Rules for classification: 1) points; 2) goal difference; 3) number of goals scored

=== Mumbai ===
Playoffs (Phase 2)
Pos	Team	Pld	W	D	L	GF	GA	GD	Pts	Qualification
1	Maharashtra Oranje	3	2	1	0	6	3	+3	7	Semi-finals
2	ICL Mumbai	3	2	1	0	4	1	+3	7	Semi-finals
3	Mumbai Ultras	3	1	0	2	2	3	−1	3	
4	India On Track^{MSL}	3	0	0	3	1	6	−5	0	

Source: MFA official The Away End Football Counter
Rules for classification: 1) points; 2) goal difference; 3) number of goals scored

Playoffs (Phase 2)
Pos	Team	Pld	W	D	L	GF	GA	GD	Pts	Qualification
1	MYJ-GMSC^{IL2}	3	2	0	1	5	5	0	6	Semi-finals
2	Reliance FYC	3	2	0	1	9	8	+1	6	Semi-finals
3	Mumbay^{IL3/MSL}	3	1	0	2	6	5	+1	3	
4	Hope United^{MSL}	3	1	0	2	7	9	−2	3	

Source: MFA official The Away End Football Counter
Rules for classification: 1) points; 2) goal difference; 3) number of goals scored

Semi-Finals
A1	Maharashtra Oranje	1
B2	Reliance FYC	0
B1	MYJ-GMSC	1
A2	ICL Mumbai	0

Finals
A1	Maharashtra Oranje	2
B1	MYJ-GMSC	1

== Southern leagues ==
=== Andhra Pradesh ===
Pos	Team	Pld	W	D	L	GF	GA	GD	Pts	Qualification
1	Godavari FC (C)	7	5	1	1	15	5	+10	16	Champions and eligible for I-League 3
2	Coramandal FC	7	4	3	0	16	6	+10	15	
3	Kolleru FC	7	4	2	1	20	10	+10	14	
4	Penna FC	7	3	1	3	14	11	+3	10	
5	Nallamala FC	7	3	1	3	7	10	−3	10	
6	Visakha FC	7	3	0	4	13	13	0	9	
7	Vamsadhara FC	7	2	0	5	6	18	−12	6	
8	Tungabhadra FC	7	0	0	7	5	23	−18	0	

Source: The Away End – Andhra Pradesh A Division League
Rules for classification: 1) points; 2) goal difference; 3) number of goals scored
(C) Champions

=== Bengaluru (Karnataka) ===
Pos	Team	Pld	W	D	L	GF	GA	GD	Pts	Qualification or relegation
1	Kickstart (C)	18	15	3	0	43	8	+35	48	Champions and promotion to 2026–27 I-League 3
2	FC Bengaluru United^{IL2}	18	13	3	2	40	3	+37	42	
3	Kodagu FC	18	12	3	3	52	16	+36	39	
4	Bengaluru B^{ISL}	18	11	5	2	45	16	+29	38	
5	South United	18	10	4	4	36	16	+20	34	
6	SC Bengaluru^{IL2}	18	10	4	4	27	19	+8	34	
7	FC Agniputhra^{IL3}	18	7	4	7	33	23	+10	25	
8	United Stars	18	7	4	7	30	35	−5	25	
9	MEG & C FC	18	6	6	6	32	33	−1	24	
10	Parikrma FC	18	6	5	7	23	28	−5	23	
11	FC Real Bengaluru	18	6	4	8	23	33	−10	22	
12	Rebels FC	18	7	1	10	21	31	−10	22	
13	Bangalore City	18	6	3	9	20	27	−7	21	
14	ASC & C FC	18	5	6	7	21	30	−9	21	
15	Roots FC	18	5	5	8	13	18	−5	20	
16	HAL SC	18	4	3	11	16	27	−11	15	
17	Bangalore Dream United	18	4	2	12	22	47	−25	14	
18	Students Union (R)	18	3	1	14	21	58	−37	10	Relegation to 2026–27 BDFA A Division
19	Bharat Bengaluru (R)	18	1	0	17	10	60	−50	3	Relegation to 2026–27 BDFA A Division

Source: The Away End
Rules for classification: 1) points; 2) goal difference; 3) number of goals scored
(C) Champions; (R) Relegated

=== Kerala ===
Championship Stage
Pos	Team	Pld	W	D	L	GF	GA	GD	Pts	Qualification
1	Calicut FC	6	6	0	0	12	3	+9	18	Qualification For Semifinals
2	KSEB	6	4	0	2	12	10	+2	12	Qualification For Semifinals
3	Kerala Police	6	3	1	2	11	7	+4	10	Qualification For Semifinals
4	Gokulam Kerala B	6	2	2	2	8	5	+3	8	Qualification For Semifinals
5	Golden Threads	6	2	2	2	8	9	−1	8	
6	EMEA College	6	0	2	4	6	12	−6	2	
7	Real Malabar	6	0	1	5	8	19	−11	1	
8	Inter Kerala (withdrew)	3	0	2	1	5	6	−1	2	

Updated to match(es) played on 26 May 2026.
Source: The Away End
Rules for classification: 1) points; 2) goal difference; 3) number of goals scored

Semifinals
1	Calicut	2
3	Kerala Police	1
2	KSEB	1
4	Gokulam Kerala B	2

Finals
1	Calicut	2
2	Gokulam Kerala B	3

== See also ==
- Men
  - 2025–26 Indian Super League (Tier I)
  - 2025–26 Indian Football League (Tier II)
  - 2025–26 I-League 2 (Tier III)
  - 2025–26 I-League 3 (Tier IV)
  - 2025–26 AIFF Super Cup
  - 2025 Durand Cup
- Women
  - 2025–26 Indian Women's League (Tier I)
  - 2025–26 Indian Women's League 2 (Tier II)
