= List of football clubs in India =

There are roughly 50 thousand football clubs and academies operating in India. This is a shortened list of professional football clubs located in India, with leagues and states they play in.

The following list of participating teams and leagues is provisional.

== By league and division ==
=== Indian Super League (1st tier) ===
Current clubs (14)
Club	City	Stadium	Capacity	Founded	Joined
Bengaluru FC	Bengaluru, Karnataka	Sree Kanteerava Stadium	25,810	2013	2017
Chennaiyin	Chennai, Tamil Nadu	Jawaharlal Nehru Stadium	28,484	2014	2014
East Bengal	Kolkata, West Bengal	Salt Lake Stadium, East Bengal Ground	85,000	1920	2020
Goa	Margao, Goa	Jawaharlal Nehru Stadium	19,000	2014	2014
Delhi	Delhi,	G. M. C. Balayogi Athletic Stadium	30,000	2019	2019
Jamshedpur	Jamshedpur, Jharkhand	JRD Tata Sports Complex	23,887	2017	2017
Kerala Blasters	Kochi, Kerala	Jawaharlal Nehru Stadium	79,000	2014	2014
Mohun Bagan Super Giant	Kolkata, West Bengal	Salt Lake Stadium, Mohun Bagan Ground	85,000	1889	2020
Mumbai City	Mumbai, Maharashtra	Mumbai Football Arena	11,790	2014	2014
NorthEast United	Guwahati, Assam	Indira Gandhi Athletic Stadium	25,000	2014	2014
Odisha	Bhubaneswar, Odisha	Kalinga Stadium	19,000	2019	2019
Punjab	Ludhiana, Punjab	Guru Gobind Singh Stadium	30,000	2020	2023
Mohammedan	Kolkata	Mohammedan Sporting Ground	22,000	1891	2024

=== Indian Football League (2nd tier) ===
Current clubs(12)
Club	City/State/UT	Stadium	Capacity	Owners	Founded	Joined	Seasons in I-League
Aizawl	Aizawl	Rajiv Gandhi Stadium	20,000	Robert Romawia Royte	1984	2015–16	2012–Present
Churchill Brothers	Margao	Tilak Maidan	5,000	Churchill Alemao	1988	2016–17	2007–14; 2016–Present
Delhi	New Delhi	Ambedkar Stadium	30,000	Ranjit Bajaj	1994	2023–24	2023–Present
Gokulam Kerala	Kozhikode	Kozhikode Corporation EMS Stadium	80,000	Sree Gokulam Group	2017	2017–18	2017–Present
Inter Kashi	Varanasi	Dr Sampurnanand Sports Stadium	10,000	RDB Group	2023	2023–24	2023–Present
Rajasthan United	Jaipur	Vidyadhar Nagar Stadium	3,000	Vertak Group	2018	2021–22	2021–Present
Real Kashmir	Srinagar	TRC Turf Ground	11,000	Shamim Mehraj; Sandeep Chattoo	2016	2018–19	2018–Present
Shillong Lajong	Shillong	Jawaharlal Nehru Stadium	30,000	Shillong Lajong Pvt. Ltd.	1983	2023–24	2009–2019; 2023–Present
Sreenidi Deccan	Vizag	Deccan Football Arena	5,000	Sreenidhi Group	2015	2021–22	2021–Present
Namdhari FC	Punjab	Namdhari Stadium	1000	Namdhari Seeds	1975	2023–24	2023–Present
Dempo	Panaji	Nagoa Ground	10,000	Dempo Group	1968	2024–25	2007–2014 2024–Present
SC Bengaluru	Bengaluru	Bangalore Football Stadium	8,400	Kishore S Reddy	2022	2024–25	2024–Present

=== I-League 2 (3rd tier) ===
Current clubs (8)
Club	City	Stadium	Capacity	Owners	Founded
FC Bengaluru United	Bengaluru	Bangalore Football Stadium	8,400	Gaurav Manchanda	2018
Maharashtra Oranje	Mumbai	Cooperage Ground	5,000	Satyajeet Saaini	2017
Mumbai Kenkre	Mumbai	Cooperage Ground	5,000	Adib Krishna Sinai Kenkre	2000
United	Kalyani	Kalyani Stadium	20,000	Nabab Bhattacharya	1927
Sporting Goa	Panaji	Tilak Maidan	5,000	Peter Vaz	1999
Sudeva Delhi	New Delhi	Ambedkar Stadium; Chhatrasal Stadium	30,000; 16,000	Anuj Gupta; Vijay Hakari	2014
NEROCA	Imphal	Khuman Lampak Main Stadium	35,285	NEROCA Football Club	1965
TRAU	Imphal	Khuman Lampak Main Stadium	35,285	TRAU Football Club	1954

== Andhra Pradesh ==
National league clubs
Club	Town or city	League
Godavari FC	Visakhapatnam	I-League 3

Other clubs
Club	Town or city	League
Vizag City FC Coramandal	Visakhapatnam	-

== Arunachal Pradesh ==
Main State league: Indrajit Namchoom Arunachal League

State league clubs
Club	Town or city	League
Capital Complex FC	Itanagar	Indrajit Namchoom Arunachal League
Dibang United	Dibang Valley	Indrajit Namchoom Arunachal League
Kameng United FC	East Kameng	Indrajit Namchoom Arunachal League
Monyul	Bichom	Indrajit Namchoom Arunachal League
Namsai	Namsai	Indrajit Namchoom Arunachal League
Patkai United	Tirap	Indrajit Namchoom Arunachal League
Siang Warriors	Upper Siang	Indrajit Namchoom Arunachal League
Subansiri United FC	Upper Subansiri	Indrajit Namchoom Arunachal League
United Kurung	Kurung Kumey	Indrajit Namchoom Arunachal League
Xiga United	West Siang, Lepa Rada, Lower Siang	Indrajit Namchoom Arunachal League

== Assam ==
Main State league: Assam State Premier League

National league clubs
Club	Town or city	League
NorthEast United FC	Guwahati	Indian Super League
United Chirang Duar FC	Chirang	I-League 3 Assam State Premier League
Karbi Anglong Morning Star FC	Diphu	I-League 3 Assam State Premier League
Chhaygaon FC	Chhaygaon	I-League 3 Assam State Premier League

State league clubs
Club	Town or city	League
Assam Police FC	Guwahati	Assam State Premier League; Guwahati Premier Football League
FC Green Valley	Guwahati	Assam State Premier League; Guwahati Premier Football League
Elevenstar Club	Bongaigaon	Assam State Premier League
Jorhat Town Club	Jorhat	Assam State Premier League
Haluating United FC	Amguri	Assam State Premier League
Assam United FC	Guwahati	Assam State Premier League
Lenruol FC	Lakhipur	Assam State Premier League
Immortal Warriors FC	Tezpur	Assam State Premier League
Hawk FA	Guwahati	Assam State Premier League

Other clubs
Club	Town or city	League
DBI SC	Guwahati	Guwahati Premier Football League
ASEB Sports Club	Guwahati	Guwahati Premier Football League
NF Railway SA	Guwahati	Guwahati Premier Football League
Gauhati Town Club	Guwahati	Guwahati Premier Football League
Oil India FC	Duliajan	Guwahati Premier Football League
Barekuri FC	Tinsukia	Guwahati Premier Football League
Pride East Mavericks	Guwahati	Guwahati Premier Football League
Sunrise AC	Guwahati	Guwahati Premier Football League
SAI	Guwahati	Guwahati Premier Football League
G Plus Athletic	Guwahati	Guwahati Premier Football League
NRL FA	Numaligarh	Guwahati Premier Football League
Guwahati City FC	Guwahati	Indian Women's League, GSA A Division Football League
Baarhoongkha AC	Kokrajhar	-
Bodoland FC	Kokrajhar	-
Dima United FC	Haflong	-
Hills United FC	Diphu	GDSA Club League
India Club, Silchar	Silchar	-
Dynamo Club	Guwahati	GSA A Division Football League

== Bihar ==
Main State league: Bihar State Soccer League

State league clubs
Club	Town or city	League
Shirsh Bihar United FC	Muzaffarpur	Bihar State Soccer League
Muzaffarpur Sporting Club	Muzaffarpur	Bihar State Soccer League
Sporting FC	Patna	Bihar State Soccer League
Babu FC	Patna	Bihar State Soccer League
RDPS FC	Motihari	Bihar State Soccer League
Adiwasi United FC	Purnea	Bihar State Soccer League
Bihar United FC		Bihar State Soccer League
Patory FC		Bihar State Soccer League
ARM FA		Bihar State Soccer League

Other clubs
Club	Town or city	League
BRC Danapur	Patna	Moin-ul-Haq Cup
Rainbow Football Club	Patna	Moin-ul-Haq Cup
Sporting Football Club	Patna	Moin-ul-Haq Cup
Friends Football Club	Patna	Moin-ul-Haq Cup
Raaj Milk Football Club	Patna	Moin-ul-Haq Cup
Adivasi United FC	Purnea	Moin-ul-Haq Cup
RK Steel	Siwan	Moin-ul-Haq Cup

Women's
Club	Town or City	League
Shirsh Bihar United FC	Muzaffarpur	Indian Women's League, Bihar Women's League
Rani Laxmi Bai Sports Academy	Siwan	Bihar Women's League
Ram Dayal Prasad Sah FC		Bihar Women's League

== Chandigarh ==
- Chandigarh Football League

== Chhattisgarh ==
Main State league: Chhattisgarh State Men's Football League Championship

Club	Town or city
Indian Heroes	Bilaspur
BMY	Charoda
Unique FC	Dhamtari
Rajhara Mines FC	Dalli Rajhara
Raipur FC	Raipur
Adani Sarguja FA	
Rovers Club	Durg
Bhilai Steel Plant FC	Bhilai
RKM FA	Narayanpur

Club	Town or City	League
JCB Bhilai Brothers FC	Bhilai	
Sports Authority of India (Chhattisgarh)	Raipur	-

== Delhi ==
Main State league: Delhi Senior Division
Main women's league: FD Women's League

National league clubs
Club	Town or city	League
SC Delhi	Delhi	Indian Super League
Delhi FC	New Delhi	I-League 2

State League clubs
Club	Town or City	League
Garhwal Heroes FC	New Delhi	Delhi Senior Division
Delhi United	New Delhi and Greater Noida	Delhi Senior Division
Hindustan	New Delhi	Delhi Senior Division
Delhi FC	New Delhi	Delhi Senior Division
Sudeva Delhi	New Delhi	Delhi Senior Division
Rangers SC	New Delhi	Delhi Senior Division
Royal Rangers FC	New Delhi	Delhi Senior Division
Garhwal Diamond FC	New Delhi	Delhi Senior Division
Jaguar FC	New Delhi	Delhi Senior Division
Shastri FC	New Delhi	Delhi Senior Division
Youngmen SC	New Delhi	Delhi Senior Division
National United FC	New Delhi	Delhi Senior Division
Uttarakhand FC	New Delhi	Delhi Senior Division
City FC	New Delhi	Delhi Senior Division
Ahbab FC	New Delhi	Delhi Senior Division
Tarun Sangha	New Delhi	Delhi Senior Division
Indian Air Force	New Delhi	Delhi Senior Division
CISF Protectors	New Delhi	Delhi Senior Division
Friends United FC	New Delhi	Delhi Senior Division

Other clubs
Club	Town or city	League
Simla Youngs	New Delhi	Delhi Senior Division
New Delhi Heroes	New Delhi	Delhi Senior Division
Indian National FC	New Delhi	Delhi Senior Division
Punjab Heroes FC	New Delhi	Delhi Senior Division
Delhi Mughals FC	New Delhi	Delhi Senior Division
Goodwill FC	New Delhi	Delhi Senior Division
Shahdara FC	New Delhi	Delhi Senior Division
NVD CITY FC	New Delhi	Delhi Senior Division

Women's league clubs
Club	Town or city	League
Hans Women FC	New Delhi	Indian Women's League, Delhi Women's League
HOPS FC		Delhi Women's League
Juba Sangha FC		Delhi Women's League
Signature FC		Delhi Women's League
Royals Rangers FC		Delhi Women's League
Garhwal United FC		Delhi Women's League
Growing Stars SC		Delhi Women's League

== Goa ==
Main State league: Goa Professional League

National league clubs
Club	Town or city	League
FC Goa	Goa	Indian Super League
Churchill Brothers	Salcette	Indian Super League
Dempo	Panjim	Indian Football League
Sporting Clube de Goa	Panjim	I-League 2
Clube de Salgaocar	Vasco da Gama	I-League 3
SESA	Sanquelim	Goa Professional League; I-League 3

State league clubs
Club	Town or city	League
Dempo	Panjim	Goa Professional League
FC Goa Reserves and Academy	Goa	Goa Professional League
Sporting Clube de Goa	Panjim	Goa Professional League
Vasco	Vasco da Gama	Goa Professional League
Calangute Association	Calangute	Goa Professional League
Guardian Angel SC	Curchorem	Goa Professional League
Panjim Footballers	Panjim	Goa Professional League
Young Boys of Tonca	Panjim	Goa Professional League
Geno Sports Club	Mapusa	Goa Professional League
Cortalim Villagers	Cortalim	Goa Professional League
Pax of Nagoa SC	Nagoa	Goa Professional League

Other clubs
Club	Town or city	League
Fransa-Pax FC	Nagoa	-
Laxmi Prasad	Mapusa	-
Salgaocar	Vasco da Gama	-

Main women's league: GFA Women's League

Women's clubs
Club	Town or city	League
Compassion FC		GFA Women's League
Sirvodem SC		Indian Women's League
FC Goa (women)		GFA Women's League
Futebol Club of YFA		GFA Women's League
Goa United SC		GFA Women's League
Young Boys of Tonca		GFA Women's League

== Gujarat ==
Main State league: Gujarat Super League

National league clubs
Club	Town or city	League
ARA FC	Ahmedabad	I-League 3
Baroda FA	Vadodara	I-League 3

Other clubs
Club	Town or city	League
Ahmedabad Avengers	Ahmedabad	Gujarat Super League
Gandhinagar Giants	Gandhinagar	Gujarat Super League
Karnavati Knights	Ahmedabad	Gujarat Super League
Saurashtra Spartans	Saurashtra	Gujarat Super League
Surat Strikers	Surat	Gujarat Super League
Vadodara Warriors	Vadodara	Gujarat Super League
St. Joseph's FC	Ahmedabad	
Gandhinagar FC	Gandhinagar	
O2 FC	Gandhinagar	

== Haryana ==
Club	Town or city	League
ShivAnand Haryana Football Club	Karnal	Youth I-League
Amity United Football Club	Gurgaon	Haryana State Football League

== Himachal Pradesh ==
Main State league: Himachal Football League

State league clubs
Club	Town or city	League
Techtro Swades United Football Club	Una	Himachal Football League; I-League 3
Shimla FC	Shimla	Himachal Football League
Paonta United FC	Paonta Sahib	Himachal Football League
Sai Kangra FA	Kangra	Himachal Football League
Shahpur FC	Shahpur	Himachal Football League
Shiva FC	–	Himachal Football League
Summer Hill United FC	Shimla	Himachal Football League
Venga Boys Kullu FC	Kullu	Himachal Football League

== Jammu and Kashmir ==
Main State league: JKFA Professional League

National league clubs
Club	Town or city	League
Real Kashmir F.C.	Srinagar	Indian Football League

State league clubs
Club	Town or city	League
Lonestar Kashmir F.C.	Srinagar	I-League 2, JKFA Professional League
NGR FC Jammu	Jammu	I-League 2nd Division
Hyderya Sports FC	Srinagar	JKFA Professional League
Shaheen FC	Jammu	
Downtown Heroes FC	Downtown Srinagar	JKFA Professional League
Jammu United FC	Jammu	
Kathua United FC	Kathua	
J&K Bank Football Club	Srinagar	JKFA Professional League
Kashmir Avengers FC		JKFA Professional League
Novelty FC		JKFA Professional League
Almuqeet FC	Srinagar	JKFA Professional League, Jammu and Kashmir Premier Football League
FC1 Kashmir	Srinagar	
FC Ganderbal	Ganderbal	JKFA Professional League, Jammu and Kashmir Premier Football League

== Jharkhand ==
Club	Town or city	League
Jamshedpur FC	Jamshedpur	Defunct
Tata Football Academy	Jamshedpur	Elite League

== Karnataka ==
Main State league: Karnataka Super Division

National league clubs
Club	Town or city	League
Bengaluru FC	Bengaluru	Indian Super League
FC Bengaluru United	Bengaluru	Indian Football League
SC Bengaluru	Bengaluru	I-League 2

State league clubs
Club	Town or city	League
Kickstart FC	Bengaluru	Karnataka Super Division
ADE FC	Bengaluru	Karnataka Super Division
FC Agniputhra	Bengaluru	Karnataka Super Division
Bengaluru Eagles FC	Bengaluru	Karnataka Super Division
Bangalore City FC	Bengaluru	Karnataka Super Division
MEG & C FC	Bengaluru	Karnataka Super Division
ASC & C FC	Bengaluru	Karnataka Super Division
FC Deccan	Bengaluru	Karnataka Super Division
Bangalore Dream United FC	Bengaluru	Karnataka Super Division
HAL	Bengaluru	Karnataka Super Division
Student Union FC	Bengaluru	Karnataka Super Division
FC Real Bengaluru	Bengaluru	Karnataka Super Division
Rebels FC	Bengaluru	Karnataka Super Division
Roots FC	Bengaluru	Karnataka Super Division
Technico Football Foundation	Bengaluru	Karnataka Super Division
Bengaluru Independents FC	Bengaluru	Karnataka Super Division
Kodagu FC	Kodagu	Karnataka Super Division

Other clubs
Club	Town or city	League
Ozone	Bengaluru	I-League 2
South United	Bengaluru	I-League 2
FC Mangaluru	Mangaluru	
KGF Academy	Bengaluru	
Real Kanakpura FC	Kanakpura	
Indian Telephone Industries	Bengaluru	

Main Women's League: Karnataka Women's League

Women's clubs
Club	Town or City	League
Kickstart FC	Bengaluru	Karnataka Women's League
Bengaluru FC	Bengaluru	Karnataka Women's League
Kemp FC	Bengaluru	Karnataka Women's League
Parikarma FC		Karnataka Women's League
Bengaluru Braves FC		Karnataka Women's League
Misaka United FC		Karnataka Women's League
Matru Pratishtana FC		Karnataka Women's League
Legends de Sporting FC		Karnataka Women's League
Bengaluru Soccer Galaxy		Karnataka Women's League

== Kerala ==
National league clubs
Club	Town or city	League
Kerala Blasters FC	Kochi	Indian Super League
Gokulam Kerala FC	Kozhikode	Indian Football League
SAT Tirur	Tirur	I-League 2

State league clubs
	Club	City	League
1	BASCO FC	Malappuram	Kerala Premier League
2	FC Kerala	Thrissur	Kerala Premier League
3	Gokulam Kerala FC (Reserves)	Kozhikode	Kerala Premier League
4	Golden Threads FC	Kochi	Kerala Premier League
5	KBFC Reserves	Kochi	Kerala Premier League
6	Kerala United FC	Malappuram	Kerala Premier League
7	Kerala Police	Various	Kerala Premier League
8	Kovalam Football Club	Kovalam, Kovalam	Kerala Premier League
9	KSEB	Thiruvananthapuram	Kerala Premier League
10	Luca Soccer Club	Kondotty	Kerala Premier League
11	MA College	Kothamangalam	Kerala Premier League
12	Muthoot FA	Kochi	Kerala Premier League
13	Don Bosco FA	Kochi	Kerala Premier League
14	Little Flower FA	Thiruvananthapuram	Kerala Premier League
15	Travancore Royals FC	Thiruvananthapuram	Kerala Premier League
16	FC Areekode	Areekode	Kerala Premier League
17	Real Malabar FC	Kondotty	Kerala Premier League
18	Wayanad United FC	Kalpetta	Kerala Premier League
19	PFC Kerala	Parappur	Kerala Premier League
20	SAI Thiruvananthapuram	Thiruvananthapuram	Kerala Premier League
21	Altius IFA	Koppam	Kerala Premier League

District clubs
Club	Town or city	League	Former league
Calicut Chandni	Calicut	Kozhikkode District A Division	I-League 2nd Division
FC Thrissur	Thrissur	Kerala Premier League	
SBI Kerala FC	Thiruvananthapuram	National Football League (India) Kerala Premier League	
Eagles	Kochi	Ernakulam District Division	I-League 2nd Division
Young Indians FC	Kozhikode	Kozhikkode District A Division	
Falcons SC	Kozhikode	Kozhikkode District A Division	
Shooters United Padne	Kasaragod	-	
KTC FC	Kozhikode	Kozhikkode District A Division	
Young Challenge FC	Kozhikode	Kozhikkode District A Division	
Muvattupuzha FC	Ernakulam	Ernakulam District C Division	
Countdown FC	Idukki	-	
Red Star FC	Thrissur	Thrissur Football League	
Josco FC	Kochi	Ernakulam District Division	I-League 2nd Division
Titanium FC	Thiruvananthapuram	Thiruvananthapuram District Football League	I-League 2nd Division
Abu Soccers	Kochi	Ernakulam District Division	
Brothers Chirayinkeezhu FC	Thiruvananthapuram	Thiruvananthapuram District Football League	
Pattom FC	Thiruvananthapuram	Thiruvananthapuram District Football League	
Malabar United FC	Ernakulam	Ernakulam District Division	I-League 2nd Division
Vaniyambalam United	Malappuram		
R B Ferguson Club	Thrissur	Defunct	
Viva Kerala	Kochi	Defunct	
ICC Pookkottumpadam	Malappuram		

== Ladakh ==
- Ladakh Super League
- 1 Ladakh FC

== Madhya Pradesh ==
Main state league: Madhya Pradesh Premier League

State league clubs
Club	Town or city	League
Ratlam City FC		
Sehore Boys FC		
Social Warrior FC		
SWS Shivaji FC		
Chamunda FC		
Eagles FC		
Seven Strikers FC		Madhya Pradesh Premier League
Lion's Club	Jabalpur	Madhya Pradesh Premier League
The Diamond Rock FA		Madhya Pradesh Premier League
Bharti FC		Madhya Pradesh Premier League
Khel Evem Yuva Kalyan		Madhya Pradesh Premier League
Barwani FC		Madhya Pradesh Premier League, Indian Women's League
Hazrat Nizamuddin FC	Bhopal	Madhya Pradesh Premier League
Madhya Bharat	Bhopal	Madhya Pradesh Premier League
Pride Sports	Jabalpur	Madhya Pradesh Premier League
Madan Maharaj FC	Bhopal	Madhya Pradesh Premier League
Lake City FC	Bhopal	Madhya Pradesh Premier League

== Maharashtra ==
Main State League: Mumbai Football League, Pune Football League

National league clubs
Club	Town or city	League
Mumbai City FC	Mumbai	Indian Super League
Mighty Young Joe–Goalorious Mothers SC	Mumbai	I-League 2
Kenkre	Mumbai	I-League 3
Maharashtra Oranje	Mumbai	I-League 3

State league clubs
Club	Town or city	League
FC Kolhapur City	Kolhapur	Indian Women's League
PIFA	Mumbai	Mumbai Football League, Mumbai Women's League
Mumbai Marines FC	Mumbai	Mumbai Football League
Air India	Mumbai	-
ONGC FC	Mumbai	Mumbai Football League
Ambernath United Atlanta FC	Mumbai	Mumbai Football League, I-League 2nd Division
Mumbai Strikers	Mumbai	Mumbai Football League
South-East-Central Railway Sports Club	Mumbai	Mumbai Football League
Mumbai Knights FC	Mumbai	WIFA Women's Football League
Krida Prabodhini		WIFA Women's Football League
Aspire FC	Pune	WIFA Women's Football League
Navi Mumbai Sports Association F.C.	Navi Mumbai	Thane Football League
Thane City FC	Thane	Thane Football League
B.Y.B.F.C	Dombivli	Thane Football League
Navi Mumbai United	Navi Mumbai	Thane Football League
Rabbani Sporting Club	Kamptee	NDFA Elite Division
Ansar Football Club	Kamptee	NDFA Elite Division
Bengal Mumbai FC	Mumbai	Defunct
DSK Shivajians F.C.	Pune	Defunct
FC Pune City	Pune	Defunct
Mumbai	Mumbai	Defunct
Pune	Pune	Defunct
Bharat FC	Pune	Defunct
Mumbai Tigers F.C.	Mumbai	Defunct

== Manipur ==
Main State league: Manipur State League

National league clubs
Club	Town or city	League
NEROCA	Imphal	I-League 2
TRAU	Imphal	I-League 2
KLASA	Bishnupur, Manipur	I-League 3

State league clubs
Club	Town or city	League
DM Rao	Sekmai	Manipur State League
Ganggam SC		Manipur State League
KIYC	Kshetri	Manipur State League
KLASA	Keinou	Manipur State League
NEROCA FC	Imphal	Manipur State League
Sagolband United		Manipur State League
Southern Sporting Union	Singjamei	Manipur State League
TRAU FC	Imphal	Manipur State League
Yarkhok United FC		Manipur State League
AFC	Thoubal	Manipur State League
AIM	Khabm Lamkhai	Manipur State League
NACO	Nambul Mapal	Manipur State League
NISA	Thangmeiband	Manipur State League
Manipur Police SC		Manipur State League
Muvanlai Athletics		Manipur State League
United Khawzim Brothers		Manipur State League
Young Physique’s Union (YPHU)		Manipur State League

Other clubs
Club	Town or City	League
FC Imphal City	Imphal East	-
F.C. Zalen	Sadar Hills	-

Women's clubs
Club	Town or City	League
KRYPHSA F.C.	Imphal	Indian Women's League
Eastern Sporting Union	Imphal	Indian Women's League

== Meghalaya ==
Main State league: Shillong Premier League

National league clubs
Club	Town or city	League
Shillong Lajong	Shillong	Indian Football League
Ryntih FC	Shillong	I-League 3
Rangdajied United	Shillong	I-League 3

State league clubs
Club	Town or city	League
Langsning	Shillong	Shillong Premier League
Malki Sports Club	Shillong	Shillong Premier League
Rangdajied United F.C.	Shillong	Shillong Premier League
Nangkiew Irat SC	Shillong	Shillong Premier League
Laitumkhrah SC	Laitumkhrah	Shillong Premier League
Shillong United FC	Shillong	Shillong Premier League
Assam Rifles	Shillong	-
Royal Wahingdoh	Shillong	Defunct

== Mizoram ==
Main State league: Mizoram Premier League

National league clubs
Club	Town or City	League
Aizawl F.C.	Aizawl	Indian Football League
Chanmari FC	Aizawl	Indian Football League

State league clubs
Club	Town or city	League
Aizawl F.C.	Aizawl	Mizoram Premier League
Chanmari	Aizawl	Mizoram Premier League
Bethlehem Vengthlang FC	Aizawl	Mizoram Premier League
Chanmari West F.C.	Aizawl	Mizoram Premier League
Chhinga Veng	Aizawl	Mizoram Premier League
Dinthar F.C.	Aizawl	Mizoram Premier League
Ramhlun North F.C.	Aizawl	Mizoram Premier League
Zo United F.C.	Aizawl	Mizoram Premier League
Luangmual F.C.	Aizawl	Mizoram Premier League
Mizoram Police FC	Aizawl	Mizoram Premier League
Chawnpui FC	Aizawl	Mizoram Premier League
Electric Veng	Lunglei	Mizoram Premier League
Project Veng FC	Kolasib	Mizoram Premier League
FC Venghnuai	Aizawl	Mizoram Premier League
SYS FC	Lunglei	Mizoram Premier League
Ramhlun Athletic	Aizawl	Mizoram Premier League
Sihphir Venglun FC	Sihphir	Mizoram Premier League
FC Bethlehem	Aizawl	Mizoram Premier League

== Nagaland ==
Main State league: Nagaland Super League

National League clubs
Club	Town or city	League
Nagaland United	Chümoukedima	Indian Football League

Club	Town or city	League
Barak	Peren	Nagaland Super League
Longterok	Mokokchung	Nagaland Super League
Nagaland United	Chümoukedima	Nagaland Super League
Red Scars	Dimapur	Nagaland Super League
Sechü Zubza	Sechü Zubza	Nagaland Super League
Frontier Warriors	Tuensang	Nagaland Super League
27 United	Kohima	Nagaland Super League

Former clubs
Club	Town or city	League
Kohima Komets	Kohima	Nagaland Premier League
Naga Tornados	Zunheboto	Nagaland Premier League
Dimapur United	Dimapur	Nagaland Premier League
Vanguard FC-Tseminyu	Kohima	Kohima Football League
D.C. HILL C.F	Zunheboto	
Dimapur Sporting Club	Dimapur	Dimapur District Football League

== Odisha ==
Main State league: FAO League

National League clubs
Club	Town or city	League
Odisha FC	Bhubaneswar	Indian Super League
Samaleswari SC	Sambalpur	Indian Football League

State league clubs
Club	Town or city	League
Rising Students Club	Cuttack	Indian Women's League, Odisha Women's League
Odisha Sports Hostel	Cuttack	Elite League, FAO League
FAO Academy	Cuttack	Elite League
East Coast Railway	Bhubaneswar	FAO League
Odisha Police	Cuttack	FAO League
Radha Raman Club	Cuttack	FAO League
Rising Students Club	Cuttack	FAO League
Rovers Club	Cuttack	FAO League
Sunrise Club	Cuttack	FAO League
Young Utkal Club	Cuttack	FAO League
East Coast Railway Women	Bhubaneswar	Odisha Women's League
Odisha Government Press	Bhubaneswar	Odisha Women's League
Odisha Police	Cuttack	Odisha Women's League
Odisha Sports Hostel	Cuttack	Odisha Women's League
SAI-STC Cuttack	Cuttack	Odisha Women's League

== Punjab ==
Main State League: Punjab State Super Football League

National league clubs
Club	Town or city	League
Punjab FC	Mohali	Indian Super League
Namdhari FC	Bhaini Sahib	Indian Football League

Club	Town or city	League
JCT FC	Hoshiarpur	Punjab State Super Football League
Minerva Academy FC	Mohali	-
FC Punjab Police	Jalandhar	Punjab State Super Football League
Doaba Football Club	-	Punjab State Super Football League
Guru Football Club		Punjab State Super Football League
Jagat Singh Palahi FA		Punjab State Super Football League
Khalsa Warriors FC		Punjab State Super Football League
Olympian Jarnail FA		Punjab State Super Football League
Principal Harbhajan SC		Punjab State Super Football League
SGHS Football Academy		Punjab State Super Football League
Sikh Regiment Centre FC		Punjab State Super Football League
United FC		Punjab State Super Football League
Young Football Club		Punjab State Super Football League
BSF	Jalandhar	Punjab State Super Football League
CRPF	Jalandhar	Punjab State Super Football League
Dalbir Football Club	-	Punjab State Super Football League
Kehar Football Club		Punjab State Super Football League
United Punjab FC	Pathankot	Punjab State Super Football League

== Rajasthan ==
Main State League: R-League A Division

National League clubs
Club	Town or city	League
Rajasthan United	Jaipur	Indian Football League

State league clubs
Club	Town or city	League
Rajasthan United	Jaipur	R-League A Division
Rajasthan Perfect	Jaipur	R-League A Division
Neerja Modi F.C.	Jaipur	R-League A Division
Jaipur Elite FC	Jaipur	R-League A Division
FC Brothers United	Jaipur	R-League A Division
Zinc FA	Udaipur	
Islands United FC	Banswara	

Other clubs
Club	Town or City	League
Ajmer FC	Ajmer	Rajasthan State Men's League
Mewar FC	Nimbahera	Rajasthan State Men's League
Playspace F.C.	Jaipur	Rajasthan State Men's League
Poornima Panthers	Jaipur	Rajasthan State Men's League
Rajasthan Eagles FC	Jaipur	Youth League U18
Banswara FA	Banswara	R-League A Division

== Sikkim ==
Main State league: Sikkim Premier Division League

State league clubs
Club	Town or city	League
Sikkim Aakraman FC	Gangtok	Sikkim Premier Division League
Gangtok Himalayan S.C.	Gangtok	Sikkim Premier Division League
United Sikkim	Gangtok	Sikkim Premier Division League
Boys Club		Sikkim Premier Division League
Kumar Sporting FC		Sikkim Premier Division League
Sikkim Police FC		Sikkim Premier Division League
State Sports Academy		Sikkim Premier Division League
Denzong Boys FC	Gangtok	Sikkim Premier Division League

== Tamil Nadu ==
Main State league: CFA Senior Division League

National league clubs
Club	Town or city	League
Chennaiyin F.C.	Chennai	Indian Super League

State league clubs
Club	Town or City	League
Indian Bank RC	Chennai	Chennai Football Senior Division
Chennai City F.C.	Coimbatore	-
Viva Chennai	Chennai	Chennai Football Senior Division
Swaraj FC	Chennai	Chennai Football Senior Division
Hindustan Eagles F.C.	Chennai	Chennai Football Senior Division
Chennai United FC	Chennai	Chennai Football Senior Division
Chennai F.C.	Chennai	Chennai Football Senior Division
Chennai Customs R.C.	Chennai	Chennai Football Senior Division
Southern Railway Institute	Chennai	Chennai Football Senior Division
ICF Institute	Chennai	Chennai Football Senior Division
Income Tax Recreation Club	Chennai	Chennai Football Senior Division
Madras Sporting Union	Chennai	Chennai Football Senior Division
A.G.'s Office Recreation Club	Chennai	Chennai Football Senior Division

Women's
Club	Town or city	League
Sethu FC	Madurai	Indian Women's League, Tamil Nadu Women’s League

== Telangana ==
Club	Town or city	League
Sreenidi Deccan FC	Hyderabad	Indian Football League
Fateh Hyderabad A.F.C	Hyderabad	I-League 2nd Division

== Tripura ==
Club	Town or city	League
Ageya Chalo Sangha	Agartala	Chandra Memorial League
Blood Mouth FC		Chandra Memorial League
Forward Club	Agartala	Chandra Memorial League
Nine Bullets		Chandra Memorial League
Lal Bahadur Vyamagar		Chandra Memorial League
Birendra Club		Chandra Memorial League
Tripura Police FC		Chandra Memorial League
Ramkrishna Club		
Town Club		
Jewels Club		

== Uttarakhand ==
Main State League: Uttarakhand Super League

Club	Town or city	League
Corbett FC	Rudrapur	I-League 3
Pauri Platoons	Pauri	Uttarakhand Super League
Nainital FC Lakes	Nainital	Uttarakhand Super League

== Uttar Pradesh ==
National league clubs
Club	Town or city	League
Inter Kashi	Varanasi	Indian Super League
FC Banaras Baghpat	Baghpat	I-League 2
Ghaziabad City FC	Ghaziabad	I-League 3

State league clubs
Club	Town or city	League
Akbarpur FC	Akbarpur	-
Lucknow City FC	Lucknow	Lucknow Super Division
States United FC	Lucknow	Lucknow Super Division
Sunrise FC	Lucknow	Lucknow Super Division
White Eagle FC	Lucknow	Lucknow Super Division
Techtro Lucknow FC	Lucknow	Lucknow Super Division
Pride FC Lucknow	Lucknow	Lucknow Super Division
Varanasi City FC	Varanasi	-
Meerut Warriors	Meerut	-
Allahabad Sporting Football Academy	Prayagraj	-

== West Bengal ==
Main State league: Calcutta Football League

National league clubs
Club	Town or city	League
Mohun Bagan SG	Kolkata	Indian Super League Calcutta Football League
East Bengal FC	Kolkata	Indian Super League; Calcutta Women's Football League Calcutta Football League
Mohammedan SC	Kolkata	Indian Super League; Calcutta Women's Football League
Kolkata United SC	Kolkata	I-League 2 Calcutta Football League
Diamond Harbour FC	Kolkata	I-League Calcutta Football League
Bhawanipore FC	Kolkata	I-League 3 Calcutta Football League

State leagues
Club	City	League
Bhawanipore F.C.	Kolkata	I-League 3
Diamond Harbour FC	Diamond Harbour	I-League 3 Calcutta Premier Division
Sreebhumi FC	Kolkata	Indian Women's League; Calcutta Women's Football League
Peerless SC	Kolkata	Calcutta Premier Division
Rainbow AC	Kolkata	Calcutta Premier Division
Southern Samity	Kolkata	Calcutta Premier Division; Calcutta Women's Football League
Kalighat Milan Sangha	Kolkata	Calcutta Premier Division
Techno Aryan	Kolkata	Calcutta Premier Division
Tollygunge Agragami	Kolkata	Calcutta Premier Division
BSS Sporting Club	Kolkata	Calcutta Premier Division
Eastern Railway FC	Kolkata	Calcutta Premier Division
George Telegraph	Kolkata	Calcutta Premier Division
Calcutta Cricket and Football Club	Kolkata	Calcutta Premier Division
Kidderpore SC	Kolkata	Calcutta Premier Division
Bantra Sammilani	Howrah	-
TT United Football Club	Dum Dum Cantonment	-

== See also ==
- I-League 3
- State football leagues in India
- Indian football league system
- All India Football Federation
- History of Indian football
- Sikkim Premier League
- Kerala Super League
