= 2025 Arunachal League =

Indrajit Namchoom Arunachal League
- Season: 2025
- Dates: 4 October – 8 November
- Teams: 10
- Champions: Capital Complex (1st title)
- Matches: 49
- Goals: 173 (3.53 per match)

The 2025 Arunachal League, also known as 2025 Indrajit Namchoom Arunachal League (INAL), was the third season of the Indrajit Namchoom Arunachal League, the top state division of football in the Indian state of Arunachal Pradesh. The league is organised by the Arunachal Pradesh Football Association.

== Clubs ==
Locations of Indrajit Namchoom Arunachal League clubs

INAL participants
| Team | Regions |
|---|---|
| Capital Complex | Itanagar Capital Complex, Papum Pare |
| Dibang United | Dibang Valley, Lower Dibang Valley |
| Kameng United | East Kameng, Pakke-Kessang |
| Monyul | Bichom, West Kameng, Tawang |
| Namsai | Namsai, Anjaw, Lohit |
| Patkai United | Tirap, Longding, Changlang |
| Siang Warriors | Upper Siang, Siang, East Siang, Shi Yomi |
| Subansiri United | Upper Subansiri, Kamle, Keyi Panyor, Lower Subansiri |
| United Kurung | Kurung Kumey, Kra Daadi |
| Xiga United | West Siang, Lepa Rada, Lower Siang |

== League table ==
| Pos | Team | Pld | W | D | L | GF | GA | GD | Pts | Qualification |
|---|---|---|---|---|---|---|---|---|---|---|
| 1 | Capital Complex | 9 | 8 | 0 | 1 | 34 | 11 | +23 | 24 | Advanced to Qualifier 1 |
| 2 | Siang Warriors | 9 | 6 | 1 | 2 | 16 | 14 | +2 | 19 | Advanced to Qualifier 1 |
| 3 | Xiga United | 9 | 5 | 1 | 3 | 23 | 12 | +11 | 16 | Advanced to Eliminator |
| 4 | Subansiri United | 9 | 5 | 1 | 3 | 13 | 6 | +7 | 16 | Advanced to Eliminator |
| 5 | Monyul | 9 | 4 | 2 | 3 | 19 | 16 | +3 | 14 | |
| 6 | Namsai | 9 | 4 | 2 | 3 | 13 | 11 | +2 | 14 | |
| 7 | Patkai United | 9 | 3 | 1 | 5 | 11 | 17 | −6 | 10 | |
| 8 | United Kurung | 9 | 3 | 0 | 6 | 13 | 23 | −10 | 9 | |
| 9 | Kameng United | 9 | 2 | 1 | 6 | 7 | 22 | −15 | 7 | |
| 10 | Dibang United | 9 | 0 | 1 | 8 | 8 | 25 | −17 | 1 | |

Source: Arunachal League

== Playoffs ==
=== Bracket ===
Qualifier 1
2 November 2025
1 | Capital Complex | 2
2 | Siang Warriors | 1
Eliminator
3 November 2025
3 | Xiga United | 1 (1)
4 | Subansiri United (p) | 1 (3)

Qualifier 2
5 November 2025
2 | Siang Warriors | 3 (5)
4 | Subansiri United (p) | 3 (6)

Final
8 November 2025
1 | Capital Complex | 3
4 | Subansiri United | 0

=== Qualifier 1 ===
2 November 2025
19:00 IST

| Capital Complex | 2–1 | Siang Warriors |
|---|---|---|
| Rahul Goju Singpho 45'; Dorjee Tsewang 66' | Report | Mebanlamlynti Masharing 22' |

Golden Jubilee Stadium, Yupia

=== Eliminator ===
3 November 2025
19:00 IST

| Xiga United | 2–2 (a.e.t.) | Subansiri United |
|---|---|---|
| Alfred Lalroutsang 35'; Pungte Lapunge 55' | Report | Jerry Pulamte 73'; Millo Taring 101' |
Penalties
| | 1–3 |

Golden Jubilee Stadium, Yupia

=== Qualifier 2 ===
5 November 2025
19:00 IST

| Siang Warriors | 3–3 (a.e.t.) | Subansiri United |
|---|---|---|
| Mebanlamynti Masharing 70'; Lentem Panyang 78'; Kangkinam Tari 116' | Report | Jerry Pulamte 12'; Sushil Meitei Ahongshangbam 54'; Pritamkumar Singh Soraisam 105' |
Penalties
| Mebanlamynti Masharing (penalty scored); Joseph Yorpen (penalty scored); Suraj Gurung (penalty scored); Ronash Pait (penalty missed); Kangkinam Tari (penalty scored); Denzil Kharshandi (penalty scored); Sonju Bori (penalty missed) | 5–6 | (penalty scored) Tania Raji; (penalty scored) Kon Tolu; (penalty missed) Kago Duyu; (penalty scored) Millo Taring; (penalty scored) Tagru Tajom; (penalty scored) Manjit Sharma Kongbrailatpam; (penalty scored) Kishan Singh Loitongbam |

Golden Jubilee Stadium, Yupia

=== Final ===
8 November 2025
19:00 IST

| Capital Complex | 3–0 | Subansiri United |
|---|---|---|
| Dorjee Tsewang 53'; Vivek Gurung 63'; Akash Kino 66' | Report |

Golden Jubilee Stadium, Yupia
Referee: Sangam Kayang
