= 2026–27 Indian State Leagues =

2026–27 season in the state football leagues of India

State leagues in India
- Season: 2026–27
- Dates: 25 June 2025 –
- Promoted: I-League 3

The 2026–27 Indian State leagues season represents the fifth tier of the Indian football league system, a series of state-level football leagues played as qualifiers to determine teams for the 2027–28 I-League 3.

== Overview ==
Zone	State	League	Teams	League dates	Duration (months)	Champions	Runners-up	I-League 3 eligibility
North	Delhi	2026–27 Delhi Premier League						
North	Punjab	2026–27 Punjab State Super Football League	8	10 August–				
North	Uttarakhand	2026-27 Uttarakhand State Football League						
North	Rajasthan	2026–27 R-League A Division						
Northeast
Northeast	Assam	2026 Assam State Premier League						
Northeast	Arunachal Pradesh	2026 Arunachal League						
Northeast	Manipur	2026–27 Manipur State League						
Northeast	Manipur	2026–27 Manipur Premier League						—N/a
Northeast	Mizoram	2026-27 Mizoram Premier League	8	25 August–30 October 2026	2	Chanmari	Dinthar	Dinthar
Northeast	Sikkim	2026 Sikkim Premier League	10	16 July 2026-				
Northeast	Nagaland	2026 Nagaland League						
Northeast	Meghalaya	2026 Meghalaya State League						
East
East	Odisha	2026–27 FAO League	8	1 July – 5 August 2026	1	Sunrise Club	Rovers Club	Sunrise Club
East	West Bengal (Kolkata)	2026 CFL Premier Division	24	12 July – 19 September 2026	2	Mohun Bagan SG	East Bengal	Bhawanipore
East	Chhattisgarh	2025 Chhattisgarh Football League						
West	Goa	2026–27 Goa Professional League						
West	Gujarat	2025–26 Gujarat Championship						
West	Madhya Pradesh	2026–27 Madhya Pradesh Premier League						
West	Maharashtra	2026–27 Mumbai Premier League						—N/a
West	Maharashtra	2027 Maharashtra Football League						
South	Andhra Pradesh	2026 AP Super Cup						
South	Telangana	2025-26 Telangana A Division Rahim League						
South	Karnataka	2026–27 Karnataka Super Division	19	10 September 2026–				
South	Kerala	2027 Kerala Premier League						

== Northeastern leagues ==
=== Arunachal Pradesh ===
League stages
Pos	Team	Pld	W	D	L	GF	GA	GD	Pts	Qualification
1	Monyul	4	3	0	1	9	3	+6	9	Advanced to Second Phase
2	Xiga United	4	2	1	1	6	2	+4	7	Advanced to Second Phase
3	Namsai	4	2	1	1	7	5	+2	7	Advanced to Second Phase
4	Dibang United	3	2	1	0	5	3	+2	7	Advanced to Second Phase
5	United Kurung	4	2	0	2	10	7	+3	6	Advanced to Second Phase
6	Subansiri United	3	1	2	0	4	2	+2	5	Advanced to Second Phase
7	Patkai United	4	1	2	1	5	6	−1	5	Advanced to Second Phase
8	Kameng United	3	1	1	1	5	3	+2	4	Advanced to Second Phase
9	Capital Complex	4	1	0	3	6	5	+1	3	
10	Siang Warriors	5	0	0	5	2	23	−21	0	

Updated to match(es) played on 25 October 2026.
Source: Arunachal League

=== Mizoram ===
Pos	Team	Pld	W	D	L	GF	GA	GD	Pts	Qualification or relegation
1	Aizawl (W)	14	11	2	1	43	9	+34	35	
2	Chanmari^{IFL} (C)	14	9	4	1	35	12	+23	31	Advance to Semi-finals
3	Mizoram Police	14	6	4	4	20	16	+4	22	Advance to Semi-finals
4	Dinthar (E)	14	6	0	8	14	22	−8	18	Advance to Semi-finals
5	Ramthar Veng	14	4	4	6	17	25	−8	16	Advance to Semi-finals
6	Saikhamakawn	14	4	1	9	19	32	−13	13	
7	Kanan	14	3	3	8	16	33	−17	12	MPL Playoff
8	MLS (R)	14	3	2	9	14	29	−15	11	Relegation to the Mizoram First Division

Source: Away End
Rules for classification: 1) Points; 2) Head-to-head points; 3) Goal difference
(C) Champions; (E) Eligible for I-League 3; (R) Relegated; (W) Withdrew from knockouts

Semi-Finals
4	Dinthar FC	1	2	3
3	Mizoram Police	1	1	2
2	Chanmari	1	3	4
5	Ramthar Veng FC	2	0	2

Finals
4	Dinthar FC	0 (1)
2	Chanmari (p)	0 (3)

== Northern leagues ==
=== Punjab ===
Pos	Team	Pld	W	D	L	GF	GA	GD	Pts	Qualification	RGP	IFC	DFC	GKC	SPS	RCF	NFC	KSC
1	Punjab FC	7	5	0	2	12	7	+5	15	Champions		3–0		1–0		2–1	3–1	
2	International FC	7	3	3	1	9	8	+1	12	Qualification for I-League 3 (Note: If the top teams are already playing in national leagues, then the next highest ranked team(s) would be eligible for I-League 3.)			1–1		2–1			1–0
3	Dalbir FA	7	2	3	2	12	13	−1	9		3–2				2–2	2–3	0–0	
4	GHG Khalsa College FC	6	2	2	2	10	9	+1	8			2–2	2–0				2–2	
5	Sher-e-Punjab SC	6	2	2	2	7	6	+1	8		2–0			2–1			0–0	0–1
6	RCF FC	5	2	1	2	8	7	+1	7			0–2						0–0
7	Namdhari FC	7	1	4	2	9	13	−4	7			1–1				1–4		4–3
8	Kehar SC	7	1	1	5	9	13	−4	4	Relegation to Punjab State 2nd Division	0–1		3–4	2–3				

Updated to match(es) played on 22 September 2026. Source: The Away End
Legend: Blue = home team win; Yellow = draw; Red = away team win.
Rules for classification: 1) points; 2) head-to-head points; 3) head-to-head goal difference; 4) head-to-head goals scored; 5) goal difference; 6) number of goals scored; 7) fair play ranking; 8) drawing of lots

=== Rajasthan ===
Source: The Away End

== Eastern leagues ==
=== Odisha ===
FAO Diamond League
Pos.	Team	P	W	D	L	Pts.	GF	GA	GD	Status
1	Sunrise Club	7	6	0	1	19	17	5	+12	Champions & Eligible for IL3
2	Rovers Club	7	4	1	2	13	21	8	+13	
3	Sports Odisha	7	4	1	2	13	19	10	+9	
4	Rising Students Club	7	2	4	1	10	11	6	+5	
5	Radharaman Club	7	2	3	2	9	15	20	–5	
6	Kishore Club	7	2	2	3	8	11	13	–1	
7	Bidanasi Club	7	1	2	4	5	7	14	–7	
8	Rising Star Club	7	0	0	7	0	3	28	–25	Relegated to Gold League

=== West Bengal ===
Super Six
Pos	Team	Pld	W	D	L	GF	GA	GD	Pts	Qualification
1	Mohun Bagan SG (C)	3	2	1	0	9	4	+5	7	Champions
2	East Bengal	3	1	2	0	8	1	+7	5	
3	Mohammedan	3	1	1	1	5	4	+1	4	
4	Bhawanipore (Q)	3	1	1	1	3	2	+1	4	Eligible for I-League 3 (Note: East Bengal, Mohun Bagan SG, Mohammedan and United SC are already playing in national leagues while Coal India SPA is an institutional club making it ineligible to play in national leagues. Thus the next highest ranked team Bhawanipore is eligible for I-League 3.)
5	United SC	3	0	3	0	1	1	0	3	
6	Coal India SPA	3	0	0	3	1	15	−14	0	

Source: The Away End
Rules for classification: 1) points; 2) head-to-head points; 3) head-to-head goal difference; 4) goal difference; 5) number of goals scored; 6) drawing of lots
(C) Champions;
(Q) Qualified for the phase indicated

== Western leagues ==
=== Goa ===
Super League (Phase 2)

2026–27 Goa Professional League

=== Gujarat ===
Source: The Away End

=== Maharashtra ===
2027 Maharashtra State Senior Men's Football League

=== Mumbai ===
2026–27 Mumbai Premier League

== Southern leagues ==
=== Karnataka ===
Pos	Team	Pld	W	D	L	GF	GA	GD	Pts	Qualification or relegation
1	FC Bengaluru United^{IFL}	11	10	1	0	36	5	+31	31	Champions
2	South United	13	9	2	2	31	9	+22	29	Promotion to 2026–27 I-League 3
3	Kodagu FC	13	9	2	2	32	19	+13	29	
4	Bengaluru B^{ISL}	11	7	4	0	35	8	+27	25	
5	MEG & C FC	12	7	4	1	31	21	+10	25	
6	SC Bengaluru^{IL2}	13	5	4	4	22	13	+9	19	
7	Kickstart	11	5	4	2	15	12	+3	19	
8	Bangalore City	13	5	4	4	14	14	0	19	
9	FC Real Bengaluru	11	5	3	3	25	17	+8	18	
10	United Stars	12	5	2	5	17	26	−9	17	
11	Roots FC	14	4	2	8	15	21	−6	14	
12	FC Agniputhra^{IL3}	12	4	2	6	13	23	−10	14	
13	Stride Sports	11	3	3	5	13	18	−5	12	
14	Parikrma FC	10	3	3	4	11	16	−5	12	
15	Technico FF	13	3	0	10	13	49	−36	9	
16	Bangalore Dream United	12	2	2	8	8	26	−18	8	
17	Rebels FC	12	1	4	7	12	25	−13	7	
18	HAL SC	12	1	3	8	23	28	−5	6	Relegation to 2026–27 BDFA A Division
19	ASC & C FC	12	0	3	9	8	24	−16	3	Relegation to 2026–27 BDFA A Division

Source: The Away End
Rules for classification: 1) points; 2) goal difference; 3) number of goals scored

=== Kerala ===
2026–27 Kerala Premier League

== See also ==
- Men
  - 2026–27 Indian Super League (Tier I)
  - 2026–27 Indian Football League (Tier II)
  - 2026–27 I-League 2 (Tier III)
  - 2026–27 I-League 3 (Tier IV)
  - 2026–27 AIFF Super Cup
  - 2026 Durand Cup
- Women
  - 2026–27 Indian Women's League (Tier I)
  - 2026–27 Indian Women's League 2 (Tier II)
