= Indrajit Namchoom Arunachal League =

Football league in Arunachal Pradesh, India

- Organising body: Arunachal Pradesh Football Association
- Founded: 2017; 9 years ago
- Country: India
- Number of clubs: 10
- Level on pyramid: 5
- Promotion to: I-League 3 (proposed)
- Current champions: Capital Complex (1st title)
- Most championships: Gora Makik SC (2 titles)
- Broadcaster: JioHotstar
- Website: inal.in
- Current: 2026 Arunachal League

The Indrajit Namchoom Arunachal League, previously known as Arunachal Super League, is the top state division of football in the Indian state of Arunachal Pradesh. The league is organised by the Arunachal Pradesh Football Association, the governing body of football in the state under the AIFF affiliation.

== History ==
The league is named after Indrajit Namchoom, who was the first footballer from Arunachal Pradesh to represent India internationally. Its inaugural season started with seven teams in 2017. All the matches were played at a single venue, Golden Jubilee Stadium in Yupia. Gora Makik SC won the first season by beating Todo United.

== Clubs ==
Locations of Indrajit Namchoom Arunachal League clubs

INAL participants
Club	Regions
Capital Complex	Itanagar Capital Complex, Papum Pare
Dibang United	Dibang Valley, Lower Dibang Valley
Kameng United	East Kameng, Pakke-Kessang
Monyul	Bichom, West Kameng, Tawang
Namsai	Namsai, Anjaw, Lohit
Patkai United	Tirap, Longding, Changlang
Siang Warriors	Upper Siang, Siang, East Siang, Shi Yomi
Subansiri United	Upper Subansiri, Kamle, Keyi Panyor, Lower Subansiri
United Kurung	Kurung Kumey, Kra Daadi
Xiga United	West Siang, Lepa Rada, Lower Siang

== Champions ==
Season	Champions	Runners-up	Ref
2017	Gora Makik	Todo United	
2020	Gora Makik	Capital Complex	
2025	Capital Complex	Subansiri United	
2026			

== See also ==
- Indian State Leagues
