= Arunachal Women's League =

- Organising body: Arunachal Pradesh Football Association (APFA)
- Founded: 2017; 9 years ago
- Country: India
- Number of clubs: 5
- Level on pyramid: 3
- Current champions: Monyul (1st title) (2026–27)
- Most championships: Capital Complex (2 titles)

The Arunachal Women's League is the top division of women's football league in the Indian state of Arunachal Pradesh. The league is organised by the Arunachal Pradesh Football Association (APFA), the official football governing body of the state.

The inaugural season was held in 2017. The current edition was won by Monyul.

== League format ==
The first two seasons featured teams participating in a league-cum-knockout format. Since the 2026 edition, the competition has been held in a league format.

== Venue ==
The matches are held at Golden Jubilee Stadium in Yupia.

== Clubs ==
=== 2026–27 season ===
Locations of Arunachal Women's League clubs

No.	Team	Location
1	Monyul	Tawang
2	Kurung Kumey DFA	Kurung Kumey
3	Kamle DFA	Kamle
4	Matai United FC	Tezu
5	Keyi Panyor FC	Keyi Panyor

== Champions ==
Season	Champion	Runners-up	Ref
2017	Capital Complex	Arunachal SC	
2018	Capital Complex	Arunachal SC	
2026–27	Monyul	Keyi Panyor FC	
