= Lekang =

Coordinates: 27.648°N 95.938°E

Lekang is a village and Tehsil in the Namsai district of Arunachal Pradesh state, India. According to the 2011 Census of India, it has 1,536 residents across 369 households. 828 are male and 708 are female.

Lekang is located 11 km (6.8 mi) towards North from District headquarters Tezu. It is 313 km (194 mi) west of the state capital of Itanagar. It is one of the 60 constituencies of Legislative Assembly of Arunachal Pradesh.

Lekang Tehsil is bounded by Sunpura Tehsil towards North, Tezu Tehsil towards South, Anjaw Tehsil towards East, Chowkham Tehsil towards South . Pasighat City, Digboi City, Margherita City, Tinsukia City are the nearby Cities to Lekang.

The name of current MLA July-2025 of this constituency is Likha Soni

== Geography ==
Lekang is located at 27.64⁰ N 95.81⁰E and 131 meters above the sea level, situated near the bank of Noa dihing river.

== Demographics ==
As Per Indian census 2011 of Lohit district before it changed to Namsai district on 25 November 2014, Population residing in Lekang lives in urban area. The literacy rate of Lekang in urban area is 72.4% and all sex ratio in Lekang is 978.

The population of children from age of 0–6 years in Lekang circle is 4690 which is 17% of total population. The total literacy rate of Lekang circle is 72.4%. The male literacy rate is 67.53% and female literacy rate is 53.05% in Lekang Circle.Thus total literate in Lekang circle were 17,306 of which male and female were 9,633 and 7,403 respectively.

Religion wise Hindus consist around 77.63% of the total population while Christian and Buddhists consist of 9.82% and 2.19% respectively, along with other religion of 9.4% of the total population.

The indigenous Population of Lekang circle Consist of Adivasis, Ahoms, Deoris, Kacharis, Mishings and Morans, Residing in the circle of Lekang.

== Educational institute ==
- Government Higher secondary, Mahadevpur no.2
- Jawahar Navodaya Vidyalaya, Mahadevpur
- Government Higher secondary, Mahadevpur no.1
- Sunflower middle school, Mahadevpur no.2
- Government higher secondary school, Old Mohong
- Lal Bahadur middle school, Mahadevpur no. 2
- Donyi polo school, mahadevpur no.2
- Fernando school

== See also ==
- List of constituencies of Arunachal Pradesh Legislative Assembly
- Arunachal Pradesh Legislative Assembly
