= 2025–26 Mizoram Premier League =

Mizoram Premier League
- Season: 2025–26
- Dates: 21 August–1 November 2025
- Champions: Chanmari FC (3rd title)
- Relegated: SYS FC
- Matches: 61
- Goals: 207 (3.39 per match)
- Biggest home win: Aizawl 5–0 Mizoram Police; Saikhamakawn 5–0 Mizoram Police
- Biggest away win: Dinthar 0–6 Chanmari

The 2025–26 Mizoram Premier League was the 12th season of the Mizoram Premier League, the top-division football league in the Indian state of Mizoram. The league began on 21 August 2025 with eight teams competing. Mizoram Police were the defending champions. Aizawl FC won Mizoram Premier League 11 by beating Mizoram Police in the finals. However, the tournament was beset by spot-fixing allegations, leading the Mizoram Football Association to ban three teams. Sihphir Venghlun, Ramhlun Atletico and FC Bethlehem all received three year bans.

== Teams ==
- Aizawl FC
- Chanmari FC
- Mizoram Police FC
- SYS FC
- MLS FC
- Kanan FC
- Dinthar FC
- Saikhamakawn FC

== League round matches ==
=== Round 1 ===
21 August 2025
12:00

SYS FC 0-2 Chanmari FC
	K.C Malsawmsanga 2'; Johny Lalremruata 53'

Rajiv Gandhi Stadium
Referee: Vanlalhruaia Sailo

LM Store Player of the Match:

KC Malsawmsanga, Chanmari FC

21 August 2025
3:00

Saikhamakawn FC 0-1 Kanan FC
	Lalthanpuia 65'

Rajiv Gandhi Stadium
Referee: Lalramthara

LM Store Player of the Match:

Lalthanpuia, Kanan FC

22 August 2025
12:00

	Aizawl FC 5-0 Mizoram Police FC
Zomuansanga 39', 71', 77'; Eric Remruatpuia Chhangte 64'; Lalhruaitluanga 90+4'

Rajiv Gandhi Stadium
Referee: Lalrawngbawla Renthlei

LM Store Player of the Match:

Zomuansanga, Aizawl FC

22 August 2025
3:00PM

	MLS FC 2-3 Dinthar FC
M. Lalpektluanga 13' (pen.); Falton N. 43'		Ricky Lalramnghaka 5', M. S. Dawngliana 12', Lalhmangaihsanga 14'

Rajiv Gandhi Stadium
Referee: Zoliansanga

LM Store Player of the Match:

Lalhmangaihsanga, Dinthar FC

=== Round 2 ===
25 August 2025
12:00

	MLS FC 3-1 Saikhamakawn FC
M. Lalpektluanga 26' (pen.), 42' (pen.), 82'		Kiran Chhetri 22'

Rajiv Gandhi Stadium
Referee: F. Lalramsanga

LM Store Player of the Match:

M. Lalpektluanga, MLS FC

25 August 2025
3:00

SYS FC 0-3 Aizawl FC
	Lalawmpuia Sailo 45+3', 82'; Malsawmzuala Tlangte 83'

Rajiv Gandhi Stadium
Referee: Lalmalsawwma

LM Store Player of the Match:

Lalawmpuia Sailo, Aizawl FC

26 August 2025
12:00

	Kanan FC 1-2 Dinthar FC
Lalthazuala 90+1' (pen.)		C. Ramnunpuia 56', Laldanmawia 84'

Rajiv Gandhi Stadium
Attendance:
LM Store Player of the Match: Ramnunpuia, Dinthar FC

26 August 2025
3:00

	Mizoram Police FC 1-1 Chanmari FC
Lalbiakhlua 25', F. Lalrinpuia 27'		M. Lalpektluanga 88'

Rajiv Gandhi Stadium
Attendance:
LM Store Player of the Match: F Lalmuanawma, Mizoram Police FC

=== Round 3 ===
28 August 2025
12:00

	Mizoram Police FC 2-1 MLS FC
Lalhmunmawia 4'		Lalfakzuala 40'

Rajiv Gandhi Stadium
Referee: Vanlalhruaia Sailo

LM Store Player of the Match:

R Malsawmtluanga, Mizoram Police FC

28 August 2025
3:00

	Kanan FC 3-2 SYS FC
Lalthanzuala 17' 67', F Lallawmkima 77'		Oliver Lalmalsawma Khiangte 26', Stain Laltanfela 60'

Rajiv Gandhi Stadium
Attendance:
LM Store Player of the Match: F Lallawmkima, Kanan FC

29 August 2025
12:00

	Aizawl FC 3-3 Saikhamakawn FC
Zomuansanga 61', 64', Vincent Lalduhawma 90+7'		Suanngaihmuana 17' 66', Lalnunzira Sailo 11'

Rajiv Gandhi Stadium
Referee: Vanlalhruaia Sailo

LM Store Player of the Match:

Suanngaihmuana, Saikhamakawn FC

29 August 2025
3:00

	Chanmari FC 2-1 Dinthar FC
Lalruatsanga 45+1', Lalrinchhana Tochhawng 90+4'		Laldanmawia Ralte 63'

Rajiv Gandhi Stadium
Attendance:
LM Store Player of the Match: Lalrinchhana Tochhawng, Chanmari FC

=== Round 4 ===
4 September 2025
12:00

Kanan FC 0-2 Chanmari FC
	Laltluangliana 10', Joel Lalramengmawia 90+2'

Rajiv Gandhi Stadium
Attendance:
LM Store Player of the Match: Johny Lalremruata, Chanmari FC

4 September 2025
3:00

	Aizawl FC 2-0 MLS FC
Zomuansanga 5', Malsawmzuala Tlangte 54'		Oliver Lalmalsawma Khiangte 26', Stain Laltanfela 60'

Rajiv Gandhi Stadium
Referee: R. Lalmalsawma

LM Store Player of the Match:

T Lalmuanawma, Aizawl FC

5 September 2025
12:00

	Dinthar FC 2-2 Saikhamakawn FC
Lalchhanchhuaha 23', 45+2'		Suanngaihmuana 33', 90+3'

Rajiv Gandhi Stadium
Attendance:
LM Store Player of the Match: Suanngaihmuana, Saikhamakawn FC

5 September 2025
3:00

	Mizoram Police FC 1-1 SYS FC
Lalhmunmawia 90'		Johny Lalmalsawmkima 38'

Rajiv Gandhi Stadium
Attendance:
LM Store Player of the Match: Lalhumhima, SYS FC

=== Round 5 ===
8 September 2025
12:00

	Chanmari FC 3-1 MLS FC
Aaron Vanlalrinchhana 21', Michael Lalbiaksanga 72, Lalruatsanga 90+3'		Ngurthanmawia 90+3'

Rajiv Gandhi Stadium
Attendance:
LM Store Player of the Match: Aaron Vanlalrinchhana, Chanmari FC

8 September 2025
3:00

	Aizawl FC 2-0 Kanan FC
Zomuansanga 4', Vincent Lalduhawma 85'

Rajiv Gandhi Stadium
Attendance:
LM Store Player of the Match: Rohmingthanga, Aizawl FC

9 September 2025
12:00

	Saikhamakawn FC 2-1 SYS FC
Francis Malsawmkima 30', Kiran Chhetri 39'		Stephen C. Malsawmtluanga 10'

Rajiv Gandhi Stadium
Attendance: LM Store Player of the Match: Kiran Chhetri, Saikhamakawn FC

9 September 2025
3:00

	Dinthar FC 3-1 Mizoram Police FC
MS Dawngliana 32' (P), Lalrintluanga 55', Lalchhanchhuaha 61' (P)		Lalfakzuala 45+1'

Rajiv Gandhi Stadium
Attendance: TBD

LM Store Player of the Match:

MS Dawngliana, Dinthar FC

=== Round 6 ===
11 September 2025
12:00

	Chanmari FC 1-3 Aizawl FC
Laltluangliana 62'		Lalawmpuia Sailo 37', Zomuansanga 45', Vincent Lalduhawma 50'

Rajiv Gandhi Stadium
Attendance: LM Store Player of the Match: T. Lalmuanawma, Aizawl FC

11 September 2025
3:00

	MLS FC 3-1 Kanan FC
Ricky Zomuanzuala Khiangte 6', Freddy Lalrinkima 45+1' 86'		Lalthanpuia 22'

Rajiv Gandhi Stadium
Attendance: LM Store Player of the Match: F. Lalchhanchhuaha, MLS FC

12 September 2025
12:00

SYS FC 0-5 Dinthar FC
	Laldanmawia Ralte 8' 18', C. Ramnunpuia 65', MS Dawngliana 69', Lalrintluanga 85'

Rajiv Gandhi Stadium (Aizawl)
Attendance: LM Store Player of the Match: Laldanmawia Ralte, Dinthar FC

12 September 2025
3:00

Saikhamakawn FC 5-0 Mizoram Police FC
	Suanngaihmuana 39' 90+3', Lalnunzira Sailo 41' 62', Francis Malsawmkima 73'

Rajiv Gandhi Stadium (Aizawl)
Attendance: LM Store Player of the Match: Lalnunzira Sailo, Saikhamakawn FC

=== Round 7 ===
15 September 2025
12:00

	Kanan FC 3-3 Mizoram Police FC
Lalhmunmawia 6'(OG), Joseph Lalthafela 20', F Lallawmkima 38'		B.Zoramthanga 23', Malsawmfela 53', F. Lalrinpuia 85' (P)

Rajiv Gandhi Stadium
Attendance: LM Store Player of the Match: Joseph Lalthafela, Kanan FC

15 September 2025
3:00

	Saikhamakawn FC 2-2 Chanmari FC
H. Lalropuia 45+4', Emmanuel Lalhruaizela 85'		K. C. Malsawmsanga 2', Aaron Vanlalrinchhana 73'

Rajiv Gandhi Stadium
Attendance: LM Store Player of the Match: Kiran Chhetri, Saikhamakawn FC

16 September 2025
12:00

	Dinthar FC 1-5 Aizawl FC
Laltluangzela 10'		Vincent Lalduhawma 18', 34', 42', Lalhruaitluanga 73', Laltlanzova 89'

Rajiv Gandhi Stadium
Attendance: LM Store Player of the Match: Vincent Lalduhawma, Aizawl FC

16 September 2025
3:00

	MLS FC 1-0 SYS FC
Falton Beirachakhei 54'

Rajiv Gandhi Stadium (Aizawl)
Attendance: LM Store Player of the Match: K. Lalremmuana, MLS FC

=== Round 8 ===
18 September 2025
3:00

	Mizoram Police FC 3-3 Dinthar FC
Malsawmfela 35', Lalbiakhlua 72', Lalthantluanga 79'		MS Dawngliana 51', Lalruatpuia 63' (OG), Lalremtluanga 85'

Rajiv Gandhi Stadium
Attendance: LM Store Player of the Match: Lalbiakhlua, Mizoram Police FC

18 September 2025
7:00

SYS FC 0-2 Saikhamakawn FC
	Suanngaihmuana 4', Kiran Chhetri 42'

Rajiv Gandhi Stadium (Aizawl)
Attendance: LM Store Player of the Match: JH Remlala, Saikhamakawn FC

19 September 2025
3:00

Kanan FC 0-1 Aizawl FC
	Zomuansanga 13'

Rajiv Gandhi Stadium
Attendance: LM Store Player of the Match: Zomuansanga, Aizawl FC

19 September 2025
7:00

	MLS FC 1-0 Chanmari FC
Freddy Lalrinkima 90+1'

Rajiv Gandhi Stadium
Attendance: LM Store Player of the Match: K. Lalremmuana, MLS FC

=== Round 9 ===
22 September 2025
3:00

	Chanmari FC 2-0 Mizoram Police FC
Aaron Vanlalrinchhana 40', Michael Lalbiaksanga 59'

Rajiv Gandhi Stadium
Attendance: LM Store Player of the Match: Aaron Vanlalrinchhana, Chanmari FC

22 September 2025
7:00

	Dinthar FC 3-3 Kanan FC
Lalhmingthanga Sailo 6', Laldanmawia Ralte 28', 39'		C. Lalnunsanga 2', J. Lalbiakliana 16', Lalthutlunga 66'

Rajiv Gandhi Stadium
Attendance: LM Store Player of the Match: Laldanmawia Ralte, Dinthar FC

23 September 2025
3:00

	Aizawl FC 2-0 SYS FC
Zomuansanga 58', C. Zomuanpuia 79'

Rajiv Gandhi Stadium
Attendance: LM Store Player of the Match: C. Zomuanpuia, Aizawl FC

23 September 2025
7:00

	Saikhamakawn FC 1-1 MLS FC
Kiran Chhetri 27'		Lalbiakzuala 71'

Rajiv Gandhi Stadium
Attendance: LM Store Player of the Match: Lalbiakzuala, MLS FC

=== Round 10 ===
2 October 2025
12:00

	Mizoram Police FC 2-3 Saikhamakawn FC
R. Zothantluanga 86', Lalbiakhlua 89'		Francis Malsawmkima 27', Suanngaihmuana 50' (P), 62'

CYLA Playground
Attendance: LM Store Player of the Match: Suanngaihmuana, Saikhamakawn FC

2 October 2025
3:00

Aizawl FC 0-0 Chanmari FC

CYLA Playground
Attendance: LM Store Player of the Match: Rohmingthanga, Aizawl FC

3 October 2025
12:00

	Dinthar FC 1-0 SYS FC
MS Dawngliana 45'

CYLA Playground
Attendance: TBD

LM Store Player of the Match:

C. Ramnunpuia, Aizawl FC

3 October 2025
3:00

	Kanan FC 1-1 MLS FC
Lalthanpuia 22'		M. Lalpektluanga 18' (pen.)

CYLA Playground
Attendance: TBD

LM Store Player of the Match:

F. Lalchhanchhuaha, MLS FC

=== Round 11 ===
8 October 2025
03:00

	SYS FC 1-2 Mizoram Police FC
Oliver Lalmalsawma Khiangte 50'		Lalbiakthanga Hmar 6', Lalfakzuala 42'

Rajiv Gandhi Stadium
Attendance: LM Store Player of the Match: Lalbiakthanga Hmar, Mizoram Police FC

8 October 2025
07:00

	Saikhamakawn FC 2-2 Dinthar FC
Lalnunzira Sailo 6', Kiran Chhetri 48'		Samuel Lawmsiamkima 65', C. Ramnunpuia 67'

Rajiv Gandhi Stadium
Attendance: LM Store Player of the Match: Kiran Chhetri, Saikhamakawn FC

9 October 2025
03:00

	MLS FC 1-4 Aizawl FC
Ricky H. Vanlalhriatsanga 46'		Zomuansanga 8', 24', 61', Eric Remruatpuia 79'

Rajiv Gandhi Stadium (Aizawl)
Attendance: LM Store Player of the Match: Zomuansanga, Aizawl FC

9 October 2025
07:00

	Chanmari FC 5-1 Kanan FC
Singte George Kom 26', FC Lalhmunmawia 39', Lalpekhlua 45+2', C. Lalmuanpuia 72', Lalruatsanga 90+4'		F. Lallawmkima 59'

Rajiv Gandhi Stadium
Attendance: LM Store Player of the Match: C. Lalmuanapuia, Chanmari FC

=== Round 12 ===
13 October 2025
03:00

SYS FC 0-4 MLS FC
	Ngurthanmawia 15' 62', Freddy Lalrinkima 45+1', Falton Beirachakhei 67'

Rajiv Gandhi Stadium
Attendance: LM Store Player of the Match: Ngurthanmawia, MLS FC

13 October 2025
07:00

	Aizawl FC 3-1 Dinthar FC
Laltlanzova 25' 60', Vincent Lalduhawma 31'		C. Ramnunpuia 73'

Rajiv Gandhi Stadium
Attendance: LM Store Player of the Match: Laltlanzova, Aizawl FC

14 October 2025
03:00

	Chanmari FC 2-0 Saikhamakawn FC
Joshua Vanlalrinliana Ngente 53' (OG), Lalpekhlua 90+1'

Rajiv Gandhi Stadium
Attendance: LM Store Player of the Match: KC Malsawmsanga, Chanmari FC

14 October 2025
07:00

	Mizoram Police FC 2-1 Kanan FC
R. Malsawmtluanga 63', Lalbiakhlua 86'		R. Lalruatkima 44'

Rajiv Gandhi Stadium
Attendance: LM Store Player of the Match: F. Lalmuanawma, Mizoram Police FC

=== Round 13 ===
16 October 2025
03:00

	Dinthar FC 2-2 MLS FC
Lalkhawpuimawia 30', MS Dawngliana 55'		Freddy Lalrinkima 12', Ngurthanmawia 14'

Rajiv Gandhi Stadium
Attendance: LM Store Player of the Match: Freddy Lalrinkima, MLS FC

16 October 2025
07:00

	Mizoram Police FC 2-4 Aizawl FC
Lalnunsanga 11', R. Malsawmtluanga 54'		Zomuansanga 40', 48', 66', Malsawmzuala Tlangte 45+1'

Rajiv Gandhi Stadium
Attendance: LM Store Player of the Match: Zomuansanga, Aizawl FC

17 October 2025
03:00

	Chanmari FC 4-0 SYS FC
KC Malsawmsanga 1', 53', C. Lalmuanpuia 31', Lalhumhima 54' (OG)

Rajiv Gandhi Stadium
Attendance: LM Store Player of the Match: KC Malsawmsanga, Chanmari FC

17 October 2025
07:00

	Kanan FC 3-3 Saikhamakawna FC
F. Lallawmkima 15', R. Lalruatkima 22', C. Lalnunsanga 78'		Vanlalmalsawmdawngkima 31', Suanngaihmuana 35' (P), Kiran Chhetri 59'

Rajiv Gandhi Stadium
Attendance: LM Store Player of the Match: Kiran Chhetri, Saikhamakawn FC

=== Round 14 ===
20 October 2025
03:00

	SYS FC 1-3 Kanan FC
Vanlalramnghaka 10'		Lalthanzuala 45+2', 85', F. Lallawmkima 71'

Rajiv Gandhi Stadium
Attendance: LM Store Player of the Match: Lalthanzuala, Kanan FC

20 October 2025
07:00

Dinthar FC 0-6 Chanmari FC
	Lalpekhlua 4', KC Malsawmsanga 29', Lalrinchhana Tochhawng 45+3', Michael Lalbiaksanga 70', PC Rosangzuala 80' (P), Mesak C. Lalrinngheta 89'

Rajiv Gandhi Stadium
Attendance: LM Store Player of the Match: KC Malsawmsanga, Chanmari FC

21 October 2025
03:00

	MLS FC 1-0 Mizoram Police FC
HC Willis 52'

Rajiv Gandhi Stadium
Attendance: LM Store Player of the Match: Lalbiakzuala, MLS FC

17 October 2025
07:00

	Saikhamakawn FC 2-3 Aizawl FC
Suanngaihmuana 84' (pen.), 90'		Vincent Lalduhawma 55', 66', Malsawmzuala Tlangte 60'

Rajiv Gandhi Stadium
Attendance: LM Store Player of the Match: K. Vanlalhriata, Aizawl FC

== League round table ==
Pos	Team	Pld	W	D	L	GF	GA	GD	Pts	Qualification or relegation
1	Aizawl^{IFL}	14	12	2	0	40	11	+29	38	Advance to Semi-finals
2	Chanmari^{IFL} (C)	14	9	3	2	32	10	+22	30	Advance to Semi-finals
3	MLS (E)	14	6	3	5	22	20	+2	21	Advance to Semi-finals
4	Dinthar	14	5	5	4	29	32	−3	20	Advance to Semi-finals
5	Saikhamakawn	14	4	6	4	28	25	+3	18	
6	Mizoram Police	14	3	4	7	19	34	−15	13	
7	Kanan	14	3	4	7	21	30	−9	13	MPL Playoff
8	SYS (R)	14	0	1	13	6	35	−29	1	Relegation to the Mizoram First Division

Source: Away End
Rules for classification: 1) Points; 2) Head-to-head points; 3) Goal difference
(C) Champions; (E) Eligible for I-League 3; (R) Relegated

== Knockout stage ==
Semi-Finals
1	Aizawl	2	2	4
4	Dinthar FC	0	1	1
2	Chanmari	2	3	5
3	MLS FC	0	1	1

Finals
1	Aizawl	0
2	Chanmari	1

=== Semi-finals ===
==== 1st leg ====
24 October 2025	Aizawl	2–0	Dinthar FC	Rajiv Gandhi Stadium (Aizawl)
	Malsawmzuala Tlangte 26', Zomuansanga 57'			Referee: Daniel Rampanvara LM Store Player of the Match: Malsawmzuala Tlangte, Aizawl FC (J No 15)

24 October 2025	Chanmari	2–0	MLS FC	Rajiv Gandhi Stadium (Aizawl)
	Johny Lalremruata 12', KC Malsawmsanga 28'			Referee: F. Lalramsanga LM Store Player of the Match : Johny Lalremruata, Chanmari FC (J No 23)

==== 2nd leg ====
28 October 2025	MLS FC	1–3	Chanmari	Aizawl
	Ngurthanmawia 81'		KC Malsawmsanga 73', Lalruatsanga 86', Lalrokima 90+5'	Stadium: Rajiv Gandhi Stadium; Referee: Lalrawngbawla Renthlei LM Store Player of the Match: KC Malsawmsanga, Chanmari FC (J No 10)

28 October 2025	Dinthar FC	1–2	Aizawl	Aizawl
	MS Dawngliana 83'(P)		Lalawmpuia Sailo 18', Zomuansanga 30'	Stadium: Rajiv Gandhi Stadium; Referee: Vanlalhruaia Sailo LM Store Player of the Match: Zomuansanga, Aizawl FC (J No 22)

=== Final ===
1 November 2025	Aizawl	0–1	Chanmari	Aizawl
			Christopher Kamei 24'(P)	Stadium: Rajiv Gandhi Stadium; Referee: Lalrawngbawla Renthlei LM Store Player of the Match: Joel Lalramengmawia, Chanmari FC (J No 24)

== Award nominees ==
=== Best goalkeeper ===
Status	Player	Club
	Vanlalhriatpuia	Aizawl
Winner	T Zothanmawia	Chanmari
	RS Lallawmzuala	Saikhamakawn FC
	F. Lalmuanawma	Mizoram Police FC
	Rosangliana	MLS FC

=== Best defender ===
Status	Player	Club
	F. Lalchhanchhuaha	MLS FC
	Lalhmangaihsanga	Dinthar FC
Winner	Rohmingthanga	Aizawl FC
	H. Lalrempuia	Aizawl FC
	FC Lalhmunmawia	Chanmari FC

=== Best midfielder ===
Status	Player	Club
	Kiran Chhetri	Saikhamakawn FC
	Johny Lalremruata	Chanmari FC
	Aaron Vanlalrinchhana	Chanmari FC
Winner	Lalawmpuia Sailo	Aizawl FC
	Ricky H Vanlalhriatrenga	MLS FC

=== Best forward ===
Status	Player	Club
	KC Malsawmsanga	Chanmari
	Freddy Lalrinkima	MLS FC
	Suanngaihmuana	Saikhamakawn FC
Winner	Zomuansanga	Aizawl FC
	Vincent Lalduhawma	Aizawl FC

=== Best emerging player ===
Status	Player	Club
	Isak Lalvenhima	Aizawl FC
	Laldawngzuala	Aizawl FC
Winner	F Malsawmtluanga	Chanmari FC
	K Lalremruata	MLS FC
	Francis Malsawmkima	Saikhamakawn FC

== See also ==
- 2025–26 in Indian football
- 2025–26 I-League 3
- 2025–26 Indian State Leagues
