= Techtro Lucknow FC =

Indian association football club based in Lucknow

Techtro Lucknow
- Full name: Techtro Lucknow Football Club
- Short name: TLFC
- Founded: 2019; 7 years ago (as Techtro FC)
- Stadium: Techtro Football Arena, Aishbagh
- Capacity: 2,000
- Coordinates: 26.85° N, 80.91° W
- Owner: Neeraj Kholiya
- League: Lucknow Super Division; Uttar Pradesh Football Sangh League
- Website: https://techtrofootball.in/
Home colours	Away colours

Techtro Lucknow Football Club is an Indian professional football club based in Lucknow, Uttar Pradesh. The club currently competes in the Lucknow Super Division. The club was established in 2019.

== History ==
The club was founded by Neeraj Kholiya And It's Co-Founder Is An Indian Professional International Footballer, He formed Techtro Lucknow FC in May 1, 2019, which started competing in the Lucknow Super Division.After the formation of Techtro Swades United FC, it became a satellite team of their academy players.

== Honours ==
=== League ===
- Lucknow Super Division
  - Champions (1): 2021
  - Champions (2) :2023
  - Champions (3):2024
  - Champions (4) : 2025

=== Cup ===
- Late Subhash Mishra Super Sports Cup
  - Champions (1): 2022
- Hazi Shakoor Khan Memorial Football Tournament
  - Runners-up (1): 2022
- Mansarovar Cup
  - Champion (1): 2021
- SSS Republic Day Cup
  - Champion (1): 2021

== Affiliated clubs ==
- (India) Techtro Swades United FC (2020–present)
- (India) Delhi FC (2020–present)
- (India) Minerva Academy FC (2020–present)

== See also ==
- List of football clubs in India
