= 2025–26 Kerala Premier League group stage =

Football league season

The 13th Scoreline Kerala Premier League began at the EMS Stadium, Calicut, on March 8. The Super eight stage will be held in Calicut and Thrissur.

== Group A ==
Pos	Team	Pld	W	D	L	GF	GA	GD	Pts	Qualification
1	EMEA College	6	5	0	1	11	3	+8	15	Advance to Super Eight
2	Calicut FC	6	4	1	1	10	3	+7	13	Advance to Super Eight
3	Real Malabar	6	3	1	2	8	6	+2	10	Advance to Super Eight
4	Gokulam Kerala B	6	3	0	3	10	8	+2	9	Advance to Super Eight
5	Wayanad United	6	1	3	2	9	12	−3	6	
6	Kerala Blasters B	6	1	2	3	7	10	−3	5	
7	SAI Centre	6	0	1	5	6	19	−13	1	

Source: The Away End
Rules for classification: 1) points; 2) goal difference; 3) number of goals scored

=== Matches ===
8 March 2026 A1	Gokulam Kerala B	0-1	Calicut FC	Kozhikode
19:00 IST			Arjun Jayaraj 15' (P)	Stadium: EMS Stadium; Referee: Ajay Krishnan; Man of the Match: Arjun Jayaraj (Calicut FC)

10 March 2026 A2	SAI Centre	0-3	Real Malabar	Thrissur
19:00 IST			Aboobacker Dilshad 12', 67'; Mahesh K 62'	Stadium: Thrissur Municipal Corporation Stadium; Man of the Match: Aboobacker Dilshad (Real Malabar)

13 March 2026 A3	Gokulam Kerala B	2-1	SAI Centre	Thrissur
19:00 IST	Nandu Krishna 5'; Ajay PV 24'		Vikram 69'	Stadium: Thrissur Municipal Corporation Stadium; Referee: Ajay Krishnan; Man of the Match: Jemsheed Ali

23 March 2026 A6	Real Malabar	0-0	Wayanad United	Thrissur
19:00 IST				Stadium: Thrissur Municipal Corporation Stadium

24 March 2026 A7	Gokulam Kerala B	0-2	EMEA College	Thrissur
19:00 IST			Shuhaib 31'; Abdul Samad 57'	Stadium: Thrissur Municipal Corporation Stadium

28 March 2026 A8	SAI Centre	2-2	Kerala Blasters B	Thrissur
19:00 IST	Anaj 24'; Vikram 43'		Sujin 34'; Atheendran 45+1'	Stadium: Thrissur Municipal Corporation Stadium; Man of the Match: Vikram A (SAI)

29 March 2026 A9	Calicut FC	1-1	Wayanad United	Thrissur
19:00 IST	Arun Kumar 23'		Sreenath 41'	Stadium: Thrissur Municipal Corporation Stadium; Man of the Match: Sreenath (Wayanad)

30 March 2026 A10	Gokulam Kerala B	2-3	Real Malabar	Thrissur
19:00 IST	Aman Gaikwad 59' (P); Emil Benny 64'		Aboobacker Dilshad 15'; Safneed 20', 42'	Stadium: Thrissur Municipal Corporation Stadium; Man of the Match: Safneed (Real Malabar)

31 March 2026 A11	EMEA College	1-0	Kerala Blasters B	Thrissur
19:00 IST	Aflahudheen 69'			Stadium: Thrissur Municipal Corporation Stadium; Man of the Match: Aflahudheen (EMEA)

1 April 2026 A15	SAI Centre	0-4	Calicut FC	Thrissur
19:00 IST			Shamnad 7', 41'; Roshal 79'; Ajith 90+1'	Stadium: Thrissur Municipal Corporation Stadium; Man of the Match: Shamnad (Calicut)

3 April 2026 A4	Wayanad United	1-2	EMEA College	Thrissur
19:00 IST	Sreenath 27' (P)		Sajad 40'; Renshad 87'	Stadium: Thrissur Municipal Corporation Stadium; Man of the Match: Muhammed Minshan (EMEA)

4 April 2026 A12	Kerala Blasters B	0-2	Gokulam Kerala B	Thrissur
19:00 IST			Jemsheed Ali 14'; Bilal 45+2'	Stadium: Thrissur Municipal Corporation Stadium; Man of the Match: Jemsheed Ali (Gokulam)

6 April 2026 A5	Real Malabar	1-0	Calicut FC	Thrissur
19:00 IST	Arjun 68'			Stadium: Thrissur Municipal Corporation Stadium; Man of the Match: Arjun (Real Malabar)

11 April 2026 A16	Wayanad United	1-4	Gokulam Kerala B	Thrissur
19:00 IST	Nihal 45'		Jhonson 28'; Jemsheed Ali 58'; Naveen 70'; Naseeb 77'	Stadium: Thrissur Municipal Corporation Stadium; Man of the Match: Mohamed Bilal (Gokulam)

13 April 2026 A18	EMEA College	4-0	SAI Centre	Thrissur
16:00 IST	Thahir 15'; sahad 29'; Shajahan 50'; Basith 52'			Stadium: Thrissur Municipal Corporation Stadium

16 April 2026 A21	Calicut FC	2-0	EMEA College	Thrissur
19:00 IST	Manoj M 85'; Arun Kumar 90+4'			Stadium: Thrissur Municipal Corporation Stadium

17 April 2026 A19	Wayanad United	4-3	SAI Centre	Thrissur
16:00 IST	Fuad 2'; Arunlal 16'; Sreenath 81'; Abin 89'		Bikash 20'; Joyal 77'; Wangdenlama 90+7'	Stadium: Thrissur Municipal Corporation Stadium

22 April 2026 A14	EMEA College	2-0	Real Malabar	Thrissur
16:30 IST	66' (o.g.); Minshan 74'			Stadium: Thrissur Municipal Corporation Stadium; Man of the Match: Ibnu (EMEA)

22 April 2026 A13	Kerala Blasters B	2-2	Wayanad United	Thrissur
19:00 IST	Adhnan 36'; Jiyadh 90+2'		Arunlal 65'; Sreenath 70'	Stadium: Thrissur Municipal Corporation Stadium; Man of the Match: Sreenath (Wayanad)

25 April 2026 A20	Real Malabar	1-2	Kerala Blasters B	Thrissur
16:30 IST				Stadium: Thrissur Municipal Corporation Stadium

28 April 2026 A17	Kerala Blasters B	1-2	Calicut FC	Thrissur
16:30 IST			Antony 19'; Junain 34'	Stadium: Thrissur Municipal Corporation Stadium

== Group B ==
Pos	Team	Pld	W	D	L	GF	GA	GD	Pts	Qualification
1	Kerala Police	6	4	1	1	13	7	+6	13	Advance to Super Eight
2	Golden Threads	6	3	2	1	13	4	+9	11	Advance to Super Eight
3	KSEB	6	3	2	1	9	4	+5	11	Advance to Super Eight
4	Inter Kerala	6	3	1	2	10	6	+4	10	Advance to Super Eight
5	Kovalam	6	1	3	2	7	13	−6	6	
6	PFC Kerala	6	1	2	3	6	7	−1	5	
7	Kerala United	6	0	0	6	4	20	−16	0	Relegation to the 2026–27 Kerala Premier League 2

Source: The Away End

=== Matches ===
9 March 2026 B1	PFC Kerala	0-0	Kerala Police	Thrissur
19:00 IST				Stadium: Thrissur Municipal Corporation Stadium; Man of the Match: Abhinav CA (PFC Kerala)

11 March 2026 B2	KSEB	3-1	Kerala United	Thrissur
19:00 IST	Nijo Gilbert 53'; Shinu 59'; Prabanj 69'		Adhil Muneer 87'	Stadium: Thrissur Municipal Corporation Stadium; Man of the Match: Arjun V (KSEB)

12 March 2026 B3	Kerala Police	5-0	Kovalam	Thrissur
19:00 IST	Babble 12'; Bijesh 24' (P); Sajeesh 34'; Manoj 71'; Firos 90+3'			Stadium: Thrissur Municipal Corporation Stadium

15 March 2026 B4	Kerala Police	2-1	Inter Kerala	Thrissur
19:00 IST	Sajeesh 29'; Manu 84'		Aswin KV 79'	Stadium: Thrissur Municipal Corporation Stadium; Man of the Match: Sajeesh

16 March 2026 B5	PFC Kerala	0-0	KSEB	Kozhikode
19:00 IST				Stadium: EMS Stadium; Man of the Match: Mohamed Salim (KSEB)

18 March 2026 B6	Kerala United	0-5	Kerala Police	Thrissur
19:00 IST			Babble 29', 38'; Sajeesh 45+1'; Sreerag VG 83'; Jamshid 90+5'	Stadium: Thrissur Municipal Corporation Stadium

19 March 2026 B7	Kovalam	1-1	Golden Threads	Thrissur
19:00 IST	Abin A 4'		Vishnu CV 67'	Stadium: Thrissur Municipal Corporation Stadium

22 March 2026 B8	PFC Kerala	1-3	Inter Kerala	Thrissur
19:00 IST	Sahil Rashid Dar 64'		Akhil Praveen 5'; Aswin KV 45+3'; Vivek KS 90+3'	Stadium: Thrissur Municipal Corporation Stadium

25 March 2026 B9	KSEB	2-2	Kovalam	Thrissur
19:00 IST	Sreeraj K 8'; Karun Baby 34'		Fajil 19'; Akshay 37'	Stadium: Thrissur Municipal Corporation Stadium; Man of the Match: Akshay PM

26 March 2026 B10	Golden Threads	2-1	PFC Kerala	Thrissur
19:00 IST	Vishak Mohanan 34'; AJmal Khaja 38'		Arjun Das 82'	Stadium: Thrissur Municipal Corporation Stadium; Man of the Match: Vishak Mohanan

27 March 2026 B11	Kerala United	1-3	Inter Kerala	Thrissur
19:00 IST	Ranjith VM 7'		Ashvin 36'; Libin Yohannan 42'; Muhammed Ashar 82'	Stadium: Thrissur Municipal Corporation Stadium; Man of the Match: Jasim

1 April 2026 B12	Inter Kerala	0-2	KSEB	Thrissur
19:00 IST			Sreeraj K 40', 47'	Stadium: Thrissur Municipal Corporation Stadium; Man of the Match: Sreeraj K (KSEB)

2 April 2026 B13	Kovalam	2-1	PFC Kerala	Thrissur
19:00 IST	Manoj 63'; Shagil 86'		Prashanth 12'	Stadium: Thrissur Municipal Corporation Stadium; Man of the Match: Akshay (Kovalam)

3 April 2026 B14	Golden Threads	4-0	Kerala United	Thrissur
19:00 IST	Vishak Mohanan 16', 41'; Ajmal Khaja 35'; Shamil 88'			Stadium: Thrissur Municipal Corporation Stadium; Man of the Match: Vishakh

6 April 2026 B15	Inter Kerala	0-0	Golden Threads	Thrissur
19:00 IST				Stadium: Thrissur Municipal Corporation Stadium

10 April 2026 B16	KSEB	2-0	Golden Threads	Thrissur
19:00 IST	Prabanj 5'; Nijo Gilbert 16'			Stadium: Thrissur Municipal Corporation Stadium; Man of the Match: Shehin Khan (KSEB)

11 April 2026 B17	Kovalam	2-1	Kerala United	Thrissur
19:00 IST	Abin 45+2'; Hrithik 80'		Adhil 17'	Stadium: Thrissur Municipal Corporation Stadium

16 April 2026 B20	Kerala United	1-3	PFC Kerala	Thrissur
19:00 IST	Aslam 73'		5' (o.g.); sahil 51', 54'	Stadium: Thrissur Municipal Corporation Stadium; Man of the Match: Sahil (PFC Kerala)

18 April 2026 B21	Golden Threads	6-0	Kerala Police	Thrissur
16:30 IST	Dipin 11'; Vishakh 39', 46'; Ajay 42' (P); Ajmal 62'; Alvin 74'			Stadium: Thrissur Municipal Corporation Stadium; Man of the Match: Vishakh (Golden Threads)

18 April 2026 B19	Inter Kerala	3-0	Kovalam	Thrissur
19:00 IST	Vivek 90+2'		Hrithik 73'	Stadium: Thrissur Municipal Corporation Stadium

23 April 2026 B18	Kerala Police	1-0	KSEB	Thrissur
16:30 IST	Shabas 38'			Stadium: Thrissur Municipal Corporation Stadium; Man of the Match: Shabas (Kerala Police)

== Super Eight ==
Pos	Team	Pld	W	D	L	GF	GA	GD	Pts	Qualification
1	Calicut FC	6	6	0	0	12	3	+9	18	Qualification For Semifinals
2	KSEB	6	4	0	2	12	10	+2	12	Qualification For Semifinals
3	Kerala Police	6	3	1	2	11	7	+4	10	Qualification For Semifinals
4	Gokulam Kerala B	6	2	2	2	8	5	+3	8	Qualification For Semifinals
5	Golden Threads	6	2	2	2	8	9	−1	8	
6	EMEA College	6	0	2	4	6	12	−6	2	
7	Real Malabar	6	0	1	5	8	19	−11	1	
8	Inter Kerala	3	0	2	1	5	6	−1	2	

Updated to match(es) played on 26 May 2026. Source: The Away End
Rules for classification: 1) points; 2) goal difference; 3) number of goals scored

=== Matches ===
Cancelled Matches

6 May 2026 SE1	KSEB	2-1	EMEA College	Thrissur
17:00 IST	Sreeraj 44'; Nihal 89'		Aflahudheen 45+2'	Stadium: Thrissur Municipal Corporation Stadium; Man of the Match: Gifty C Gracious (KSEB)

6 May 2026 SE2	Golden Threads	1-2	Calicut FC	Thrissur
20:00 IST	Bibin Ajayan 4'		Antony K Paulose 51'; Y.Lohe 90+1'	Stadium: Thrissur Municipal Corporation Stadium; Man of the Match: Arun Kumar (Calicut)

7 May 2026 SE3	Inter Kerala	1-1	Gokulam Kerala B	Thrissur
17:00 IST	Aswin KV 53'		Jamsheed Ali 49'	Stadium: Thrissur Municipal Corporation Stadium; Man of the Match: Akhil Jayachandran (Inter Kerala)

7 May 2026 SE4	Kerala Police	2-0	Real Malabar	Thrissur
20:00 IST	Sunil NS 40'; Sajeesh 64'			Stadium: Thrissur Municipal Corporation Stadium; Man of the Match: Sunil NS (Kerala Police)

9 May 2026 SE5	EMEA College	1-1	Golden Threads	Thrissur
17:00 IST	Thahir 13'		Bibin Ajayan 64'	Stadium: Thrissur Municipal Corporation Stadium; Man of the Match: Bibin Ajayan (Golden Threads)

9 May 2026 SE6	Calicut FC	2-1	KSEB	Thrissur
20:00 IST	Antony K Paulose 63'; Rahul Venu 90+4'		Viknesh M 21'	Stadium: Thrissur Municipal Corporation Stadium; Man of the Match: Antony Paulose (Calicut)

10 May 2026 SE7	Real Malabar	0-4	Gokulam Kerala B	Thrissur
17:00 IST			Nandhu 19', 53'; Johnson Singh 32'; Jamsheed Ali 55'	Stadium: Thrissur Municipal Corporation Stadium; Man of the Match: Nandhu Krishna (Gokulam)

10 May 2026 SE8	Inter Kerala	1-2	Kerala Police	Thrissur
20:00 IST	Akhil Chandran 80'		Babble Sivery 32'; Manoj Manjunath 55'	Stadium: Thrissur Municipal Corporation Stadium; Man of the Match: Babble Sivery (Kerala Police)

12 May 2026 SE9	Calicut FC	1-0	EMEA College	Thrissur
17:00 IST	Arun Kumar 71'			Stadium: Thrissur Municipal Corporation Stadium; Man of the Match: Arun Kumar ( Calicut)

12 May 2026 SE10	Golden Threads	2-1	KSEB	Thrissur
20:00 IST	Abdullah KS 20'; Ajay Alex 48'		Nijo Gilbert 31'	Stadium: Thrissur Municipal Corporation Stadium; Man of the Match: Abdullah KS (Golden Threads)

13 May 2026 SE11	Gokulam Kerala B	1-1	Kerala Police	Thrissur
17:00 IST	Sajeesh E 6'		Muhammed Sinan 68'	Stadium: Thrissur Municipal Corporation Stadium; Man of the Match: Muhammed Sinan (Gokulam)

13 May 2026 SE12	Real Malabar	3-3	Inter Kerala	Thrissur
20:00 IST	Mahesh K 12'; Muhammed Ameen 29'; Yadhukrishna 45+2'		Vivek 10', 56'; Farsad 32'	Stadium: Thrissur Municipal Corporation Stadium; Man of the Match: Vivek (Inter Kerala)

16 May 2026 SE13	Golden Threads	4-2	Real Malabar	Thrissur
17:00 IST	Abdullah KS 61', 75'; Vishnu CV 71'; Sebastian S 89'		Faris Ali 11'; Arjun Raj 38'	Stadium: Thrissur Municipal Corporation Stadium; Man of the Match: Abdullah KS (Golden Threads)

16 May 2026 SE14	Gokulam Kerala B	1-2	KSEB	Thrissur
20:00 IST	Muhammed Sinan 23'		Gifty Gracious 18'; Arjun V 84'	Stadium: Thrissur Municipal Corporation Stadium; Man of the Match: Gifty Gracious (KSEB)

17 May 2026 SE15	Kerala Police	1-3	Calicut FC	Thrissur
17:00 IST	Sajeesh 42'		Y.Lohe 53'; Antony K Paulose 79'; Arjun Jayaraj 90+3'	Stadium: Thrissur Municipal Corporation Stadium

17 May 2026 SE16	Inter Kerala	Cancelled	EMEA College	Thrissur
20:00 IST				Stadium: Thrissur Municipal Corporation Stadium

19 May 2026 SE17	KSEB	3-2	Real Malabar	Thrissur
17:00 IST	Nijo Gilbert 14', 30'; Khalid Roshan 90+2'		Mahesh K 61'; Muhammed Ameen 63'	Stadium: Thrissur Municipal Corporation Stadium; Man of the Match: Mahesh K (Real Malabar)

19 May 2026 SE18	Gokulam Kerala B	0-0	Golden Threads	Thrissur
20:00 IST				Stadium: Thrissur Municipal Corporation Stadium; Man of the Match: Vishnu (Golden Threads)

20 May 2026 SE20	EMEA College	0-2	Kerala Police	Thrissur
17:00 IST			Anshid Ali 3'; Babble Sivery 38'	Stadium: Thrissur Municipal Corporation Stadium; Man of the Match: Babble Sivery (Kerala Police)

22 May 2026 SE23	Calicut FC	2-0	Real Malabar	Thrissur
17:00 IST	Arap 19'; Manoj 56'			Stadium: Thrissur Municipal Corporation Stadium; Man of the Match: Rijohn Jose (Calicut)

23 May 2026 SE21	Kerala Police	2-3	KSEB	Thrissur
17:00 IST	Babble Sivery 39'; Gokul S 85'		Nijo Gilbert 56', 60'; Ahmed Anfas 65'	Stadium: Thrissur Municipal Corporation Stadium; Man of the Match: Nijo Gilbert (KSEB)

23 May 2026 SE24	EMEA College	0-2	Gokulam Kerala B	Thrissur
20:00 IST			Nandu Krishna 3'; Mohamed Bilal 81'	Stadium: Thrissur Municipal Corporation Stadium; Man of the Match: Mohamed Bilal (Gokulam Kerala )

25 May 2026 SE27	Real Malabar	4-4	EMEA College	Thrissur
17:00 IST	Abin Rajan 3'; Mahesh K 4', 50'; Arjun Raj 65'		Muhammed Minshan 23', 48', 55'; Muhammed Shajahan 61'	Stadium: Thrissur Municipal Corporation Stadium; Man of the Match: Muhammed Minshan (EMEA College )

26 May 2026 SE25	Golden Threads	0-3	Kerala Police	Thrissur
17:00 IST			Sujil 5'; Sajeesh 53'; Bijesh T Balan 74'	Stadium: Thrissur Municipal Corporation Stadium

26 May 2026 SE28	Gokulam Kerala B	0-2	Calicut FC	Thrissur
20:00 IST			62' (o.g.); Shamnad 76'	Stadium: Thrissur Municipal Corporation Stadium

May 2026 SE26	KSEB	v	Inter Kerala	Thrissur
20:00 IST				Stadium: Thrissur Municipal Corporation Stadium

May 2026 SE19	Calicut FC	v	Inter Kerala	Thrissur
17:00 IST				Stadium: Thrissur Municipal Corporation Stadium

May 2026 SE22	Inter Kerala	v	Golden Threads	Thrissur
20:00 IST				Stadium: Thrissur Municipal Corporation Stadium
