= FC Ganderbal =

Indian association football club

- Full name: Football Club Ganderbal
- Founded: 2011; 15 years ago
- Ground: TRC Turf Ground
- Capacity: 11,000
- League: J&K Premier League, JKFA Professional League

Football Club Ganderbal (abbreviated as FC GBL), is an Indian professional football club based in Ganderbal, Jammu and Kashmir. The club competes in the Jammu and Kashmir Premier Football League which is top-tier football league in Jammu and Kashmir, it also competes in Khelo India youth games and JKFA Professional League.

== History ==
FC Ganderbal was founded in 2007 and is affiliated with the Jammu and Kashmir Football Association.The club participates in various state and regional tournaments.
