= Lucknow Super Division =

Indian football league in the state of Uttar Pradesh

- Organising body: District Football Association Lucknow
- Founded: 2015; 11 years ago
- Country: India
- Confederation: AFC
- Number of clubs: Various
- Level on pyramid: 5
- Promotion to: I-League 3

The Lucknow Super Division, also known as the Lucknow District Football League, is the highest state-level football league of Lucknow, in the Indian state of Uttar Pradesh. The league started in 2015. In 2021 it was organised grandly with 50 teams from the various districts of Uttar Pradesh.

== Structure ==
Teams from Lucknow, Akbarpur, Haidergarh, Farrukhabad, Unnao, and Bhopal have participated in the league.

== Winners ==
Season	Winner	Runners-up
2019	Sahara States FC	Techtro FC
2021	Techtro Lucknow FC	Sunrise FC

== See also ==
- Uttar Pradesh Football Sangh
- K. D. Singh Babu Stadium
- Dr Sampurnanand Sports Stadium
