= Monyul FC =

Monyul
- Full name: Monyul Football Club
- Ground: Various
- League: Indrajit Namchoom Arunachal League
- Website: monyul.com

Monyul Football Club, commonly known as Monyul, is an Indian professional football club based in the Bichom district of Arunachal Pradesh. The club competes in the Indrajit Namchoom Arunachal League (INAL), the premier state-level football competition organised by the Arunachal Pradesh Football Association.

== Squad ==
As of 2025

Note: Flags indicate national team as defined under FIFA eligibility rules; some limited exceptions apply. Players may hold more than one non-FIFA nationality.

No.	Pos.	Nation	Player
2		IND	Luknya Sora
4		IND	Shyan Sangchoju
5		IND	Lalnunsiana
6		IND	Likha Tenye
8		IND	Tsering Wangey
9		IND	Mohammad Faheez
10		IND	Tsering Khandu
12		IND	Joram Pupu Loma
13		IND	Gulingso Ngadong
14		IND	Levien Thapa
15		IND	Pasang Norbu
16		IND	Kalen Dabom Tamuk

No.	Pos.	Nation	Player
20		IND	Tendu Lobsang
21		IND	Leivon Renglun Anand
22		IND	Bonseng Sing Pho
23		IND	Tame Agung
24		IND	Kaorga Biyu
29		IND	Tutu Sakorinsow
30		IND	Rolex Chongtham
33		IND	Honi Tana Camdior
36		IND	Rinchin Dorjee Karma
99		IND	Nawang Penjor
—		IND	Lobsang Phelgye

== Honours ==
=== Women's ===
- Arunachal Women's League
  - Champions (1): 2026–27
