= Namsai FC =

Namsai
- Full name: Namsai Football Club
- Ground: Various
- League: Indrajit Namchoom Arunachal League

Namsai Football Club, commonly known as Namsai, is an Indian professional football club based in Namsai district, Arunachal Pradesh. The club competes in the Indrajit Namchoom Arunachal League (INAL), the top-tier state football competition organised by the Arunachal Pradesh Football Association.

== Squad ==
As of 2025

Note: Flags indicate national team as defined under FIFA eligibility rules; some limited exceptions apply. Players may hold more than one non-FIFA nationality.

No.	Pos.	Nation	Player
1		IND	Sarangthem Kenedy Singh
2		IND	Biyaiso Yun
3		IND	Rosen Ngadong
4		IND	Chawjung Chithan
5		IND	Abijamso Kathak
6		IND	Chau Gyanisha Mungyak
7		IND	Suraj Singh Yumnam
8		IND	Khumanthem Arun Singh
9		IND	Calvin Songate
10		IND	Baron Karap
11		IND	Wangkes Lowang
12		IND	Thounaojam Premjit Singh
13		IND	Soraisam Dhanachandra Singh

No.	Pos.	Nation	Player
14		IND	Chow Siladhamma Singai
15		IND	Tarh Achi
17		IND	Rohanso Ngadong
18		IND	Roshan Boi
19		IND	Chow Chewita Taipha
20		IND	Akhopi Mega
21		IND	Rakesh Kumar Rai
22		IND	Naorem Kishan Singh
23		IND	Chow Obaseng Mein
24		IND	Jona Lochung
30		IND	Rojimso Danji
44		IND	Vanno Ongja Emboi
