= Patkai United FC =

Patkai United
- Full name: Patkai United Football Club
- Ground: Various
- League: Indrajit Namchoom Arunachal League

Patkai United Football Club, commonly known as Patkai United, is an Indian professional association football club based in the Patkai region of Arunachal Pradesh. The club competes in the Indrajit Namchoom Arunachal League (INAL), the premier state-level football competition organised by the Arunachal Pradesh Football Association.

== Squad ==
As of 2025

Note: Flags indicate national team as defined under FIFA eligibility rules; some limited exceptions apply. Players may hold more than one non-FIFA nationality.

No.	Pos.	Nation	Player
1		IND	Sethok Wang Sa
2		IND	Mardo Talpodia
3		IND	Gioni Maying
4		IND	Tamang Takoh
5		IND	Taro Hirung
6		IND	Tage Nitin
7		IND	Zeeshan Ahmed
8		IND	Pisi Zauseng Singpho
9		IND	Rawang Hakhun
10		IND	Tatu Riamur Cherom
11		IND	Phungdha Pansa
13		IND	Jongkhom Mossang
17		IND	Tinglem Wangsu
18		IND	Tailyang Cosy

No.	Pos.	Nation	Player
19		IND	Palai Wangpan
21		IND	Sreesanth C
22		IND	Samchom Sawin
23		IND	Mihin Nomo
24		IND	C. Ramdinmawia
27		IND	Karlo Boz
28		IND	Jacob Jugli
29		IND	Kabak Doni
30		IND	Taba Nuku
31		IND	Ravi Kumar
44		IND	Laphang Nokbi
47		IND	Vanlalhriatpoia
