= United Kurung FC =

United Kurung
- Full name: United Kurung Football Club
- Ground: Various
- League: Indrajit Namchoom Arunachal League

United Kurung Football Club, commonly known as United Kurung, is an Indian professional football club based in the Kurung Kumey district, Arunachal Pradesh. The club competes in the Indrajit Namchoom Arunachal League (INAL), the premier state-level football competition organised by the Arunachal Pradesh Football Association.

== Squad ==
As of 2025

Note: Flags indicate national team as defined under FIFA eligibility rules; some limited exceptions apply. Players may hold more than one non-FIFA nationality.

No.	Pos.	Nation	Player
25		IND	Bamang Toko
44		IND	Bengia Ashi
5		IND	Muhmmed Nihalp
7		IND	Nictor Nido
50		IND	Talong Taring
23		IND	Biki Takar
29		IND	Biri Kara
17		IND	Byabang Agio
6		IND	Kipa Apsu
27		IND	Kipa Kaya
84		IND	Lenjing Panyang
21		IND	Rido Tadu
26		IND	Set Vang Len Mate
66		IND	Taba Pitara

No.	Pos.	Nation	Player
45		IND	Tadar Koko
9		IND	Tako Kanu
14		IND	Tamuk James
19		IND	Jhon Das
20		IND	Joram Bath
3		IND	Khyoda Tamo
12		IND	Chera Chapang
77		IND	Fabeel Tp
4		IND	Jamgoulen Lunkim
10		IND	Tarh Dolo
11		IND	Chinkhosiam Dimngel
