= FC Xiga United =

Xiga United
- Full name: Football Club Xiga United
- Ground: Various
- League: Indrajit Namchoom Arunachal League

Football Club Xiga United, commonly known as Xiga United, is an Indian professional association football club based in Arunachal Pradesh. The club competes in the Indrajit Namchoom Arunachal League (INAL), the top-tier state football competition organised by the Arunachal Pradesh Football Association.

== Squad ==
As of 2025

Note: Flags indicate national team as defined under FIFA eligibility rules; some limited exceptions apply. Players may hold more than one non-FIFA nationality.

No.	Pos.	Nation	Player
27		IND	Domkar Bogo
19		IND	Tumto Kamgo
10		IND	Pungte Lapung
9		IND	Dipu Mirdha
8		IND	Alfred Lalruotsang
17		IND	Boli Nomuk
4		IND	Kito Ete
12		IND	Ningthoujam Bimol Singh
20		IND	Yumkhaibam Indranath
5		IND	Md Esha
11		IND	Avishek Kunjam
2		IND	Kenmin Riba
16		IND	Riba Kenjom
31		IND	Kambuk Lige

No.	Pos.	Nation	Player
24		IND	Iken Lollen
23		IND	Dejo Bogo
3		IND	Lipu Doke
21		IND	Dage Chiram
18		IND	Duge Abo
48		IND	Lukmin Nyobu
15		IND	Gami Ori
29		IND	Jumbak Bomsok
60		IND	Tori Basar
1		IND	Raj Boro
33		IND	Rippak Riba
