= Siang Warriors FC =

Siang Warriors
- Full name: Siang Warriors Football Club
- Ground: Various
- League: Indrajit Namchoom Arunachal League
Home colours	Away colours

Siang Warriors Football Club, commonly known as Siang Warriors, is an Indian professional football club based in the Siang district of Arunachal Pradesh. The club competes in the Indrajit Namchoom Arunachal League (INAL), the top-tier state football competition organised by the Arunachal Pradesh Football Association.

== Squad ==
As of 2025

Note: Flags indicate national team as defined under FIFA eligibility rules; some limited exceptions apply. Players may hold more than one non-FIFA nationality.

No.	Pos.	Nation	Player
12		IND	Jestibor Mawlong
1		IND	Laishram Julyson Singh
6		IND	Laldan Mawia
14		IND	Mebanlamlynti Masharing
17		IND	Denzil Kharshandi
5		IND	Suraj Gurung
44		IND	Anurag Diyali
9		IND	Neymar Pajing
28		IND	Joseph Yorpen
7		IND	Hanu Tari
22		IND	Lentem Panyang
4		IND	Ronash Palt
35		IND	Karung Tair

No.	Pos.	Nation	Player
23		IND	Sonju Bori
10		IND	Kamin Jamoh
8		IND	Khoda Takap
—		IND	Disem Mize
19		IND	Geni Taying
21		IND	Riten Bori
16		IND	Pamindo Jamoh
49		IND	Mido Tagi
3		IND	Kangkinam Tari
2		IND	Karan Perme
47		IND	Okunam Bitin
46		IND	Keyum Mize
