= Kameng United FC =

Kameng United
- Full name: Kameng United Football Club
- Ground: Various
- League: Indrajit Namchoom Arunachal League

Kameng United Football Club, commonly referred to as Kameng United, is an Indian professional football club based in the Kameng region of Arunachal Pradesh. The club competes in the Indrajit Namchoom Arunachal League, the top-tier state football competition organised under the Arunachal Pradesh Football Association.

== Squad ==
As of 2025

Note: Flags indicate national team as defined under FIFA eligibility rules; some limited exceptions apply. Players may hold more than one non-FIFA nationality.

No.	Pos.	Nation	Player
1		IND	Gulshan Kumar Thakur
21		IND	Tai Tamang
13		IND	Techi Rania
14		IND	Tai Bai
5		IND	Debia Kangam
18		IND	Rahul Kalandi
4		IND	Ronaldo Wairokpam
66		IND	Daniel Tayem
22		IND	Beta Taki
27		IND	Akash Lingfa
11		IND	Krish Swargiary
25		IND	Techi David
8		IND	Baro Liyak
55		IND	Doga Lingfa

No.	Pos.	Nation	Player
7		IND	Tsering Sherpa
6		IND	Gyamar Taba
12		IND	Beevik Nalo
99		IND	Taba Raham
9		IND	Jacky Rapung
19		IND	Nguri Baba
10		IND	Laishram Milan Singh
20		IND	Chukhu Abo
75		IND	Lacher Natung
32		IND	Tapik Pujen
54		IND	Tashi Rabasow
