= Capital Complex FC =

Indian association football club based in Itanagar

Capital Complex
- Full name: Capital Complex Football Club
- Founded: 2003; 23 years ago
- Ground: Various
- Chairman: Kipa Takum
- League: Indrajit Namchoom Arunachal League
Home colours	Away colours

Active departments of Capital Complex FC
Football (Men's)	Football (Women's)	Futsal (Men's)

Capital Complex Football Club, simply known as CCFC, is an Indian professional football club based in Itanagar, Arunachal Pradesh. Its women's team competed in the Indian Women's League. Its men's team competes in the Indrajit Namchoom Arunachal League.

== Squad ==
As of 2025

Note: Flags indicate national team as defined under FIFA eligibility rules; some limited exceptions apply. Players may hold more than one non-FIFA nationality.

No.	Pos.	Nation	Player
23		IND	Techi Tatra
9		IND	Vivek Gurung
—		IND	Akash Taw
6		IND	Nabam Peri
77		IND	Nabam Ropo
20		IND	Dorjee Tsewang
44		IND	Jagom Loyi
3		IND	Akash Kino
13		IND	Olik Tayeng
5		IND	Hage Sarbo
8		IND	Toku Punung
30		IND	Takio Tadap
11		IND	Rahul Goju Shingpho

No.	Pos.	Nation	Player
19		IND	Takar Mengnia
22		IND	Taw Tapu
66		IND	Jenko Gadi
10		IND	Damli Bomnyo
21		IND	Momik Ado
25		IND	Kajom Bogo
17		IND	Midul Doley
42		IND	Daniel Gurung
80		IND	Toyi Taloh
27		IND	Deegranso Yun
18		IND	Tasar Negia Dignium
14		IND	Tobom Langkam

== Honours ==
=== League ===
- Indrajit Namchoom Arunachal League
  - Champions (1): 2025
  - Runners-up (1): 2020

=== Futsal ===
- 2022–23 Futsal Club Championship
  - Group stage

=== Women's team ===
- Arunachal Women's League
  - Champions (2): 2017, 2018
