= Bichom district =

- District of Arunachal Pradesh
- Country: India
- State: Arunachal Pradesh
- Established: 7 February 2023

Area
  - Total: 2,897 km^{2} (1,119 sq mi)

Population (2011)
  - Total: 9,710
  - Density: 3.35/km^{2} (8.68/sq mi)
- Time zone: UTC+05:30 (IST)
- Vehicle registration: AR

Bichom district is one of the 28 districts of Arunachal Pradesh state in northeastern India. Napangphung is its headquarters.

== History ==
In November 2023, the Arunachal Pradesh Chief Minister Pema Khandu announced creation of Bichom district. And in February 2024, the cabinet approved the bill for district creation. It was formed by carving out 27 villages from West Kameng district and 28 villages from East Kameng district. On March 7, 2024, the district was officially inaugurated by the Chief Minister Pema Khandu. The district was formed following the demand for its creation by the Aka tribe and Miji tribe.
