= Kamle district =

- District of Arunachal Pradesh
- Interactive map of Kamle district
- Country: India
- State: Arunachal Pradesh
- Established: 15 December 2017
- Headquarters: Raga

Government
  - Deputy Commissioner: Moki Loyi

Area
  - Total: 200 km^{2} (77 sq mi)

Population (2017)
  - Total: 22,256
  - Density: 110/km^{2} (290/sq mi)

Demographics
  - Literacy: 69%
- Time zone: UTC+05:30 (IST)

Kamle district, also Khamle, is one of the 25 administrative districts (26th including Itanagar capital complex) of Arunachal Pradesh in northeastern India. The district headquarters are at Raga.

Kamle got its name from the river Kamle. River Kamle joins the Subansiri river which finally meets the Brahmaputra in Assam.

== History ==
Demands for the creation of this district had been made since December 2013 when the All Nyishi Youth Association (ANYA) threatened a Bandh, and the state government gave a written assurance that it would speed up the creation of Pakke-Kessang and Kamle districts.

On 15 December 2017, Chief Minister Pema Khandu inaugurated the district.

The main inhabitants are the Nyishi.

== Geography ==
Kamle district has been formed from administration circles from Lower Subansiri district and three from Upper Subansiri district. The district has 6 administrative units: Raga, Kamporijo, Dollungmukh, Puchi-Geko, Gepen, and a portion of Daporijo Sadar circles consisting of all villages which fall under Raga assembly including Ligu and Liruk which were under the administrative control of Upper Subansiri district).

The district has one assembly constituency - Raga.
