= Arunachal Pradesh Football Association =

State governing body of Football in Arunachal Pradesh

- Sport: Football
- Jurisdiction: Arunachal Pradesh
- Membership: 22 district associations
- Abbreviation: APFA
- Founded: 1992; 34 years ago
- Affiliation: All India Football Federation (AIFF)
- Headquarters: Naharlagun
- President: Pema Khandu
- Secretary: Kipa Ajay

Official website
- arunachalfootball.com

The Arunachal Pradesh Football Association (APFA) is the state governing body of football in Arunachal Pradesh, in northeast India. It is affiliated with the All India Football Federation, the national governing body. APFA runs Arunachal Super League, the top tier league of the state. It sends state teams for Santosh Trophy and Rajmata Jijabai Trophy.

== State teams ==
=== Men ===
- Arunachal Pradesh football team
- Arunachal Pradesh under-20 football team
- Arunachal Pradesh under-15 football team
- Arunachal Pradesh under-13 football team

=== Women ===
- Arunachal Pradesh women's football team
- Arunachal Pradesh women's under-19 football team
- Arunachal Pradesh women's under-17 football team

== Affiliated district associations ==
There are currently 22 district association affiliated with the Arunachal Pradesh Football Association.

No.	Association	District	President
1	Anjaw Football Association	Anjaw	
2	Changlang Football Association	Changlang	
3	East Kameng Football Association	East Kameng	
4	East Siang Football Association	East Siang	
5	Itanagar Football Association	Itanagar	
6	Kamle Football Association	Kamle	
7	Kra Daadi Football Association	Kra Daadi	
8	Kurung Kumey Football Association	Kurung Kumey	
9	Lepa Rada Football Association	Lepa Rada	
10	Lohit Football Association	Lohit	
11	Lower Siang Football Association	Lower Siang	
12	Lower Subansiri Football Association	Lower Subansiri	
13	Namsai Rahul Saikia Football Association	Namsai	
14	Papum Pare Football Association	Papum Pare	
15	Shi Yomi Football Association	Shi Yomi	
16	Siang Football Association	Siang	
17	Tawang Football Association	Tawang	
18	Tirap Football Association	Tirap	
19	Upper Siang Football Association	Upper Siang	
20	Upper Subansiri Football Association	Upper Subansiri	
21	West Kameng Football Association	West Kameng	
22	West Siang Football Association	West Siang	

== Competitions ==
=== Club level ===
==== Men's ====
- Indrajit Namchoom Arunachal League
- Eagle Trophy
- Tadar Tang State Level Football Tournament

==== Women's ====
- Arunachal Women's League
- Arunachal Women's Football Championship

== See also ==
- List of Indian state football associations
- Football in India
- Monyul Super League
- North East Premier League (India)
