= Namsai district =

- District of Arunachal Pradesh
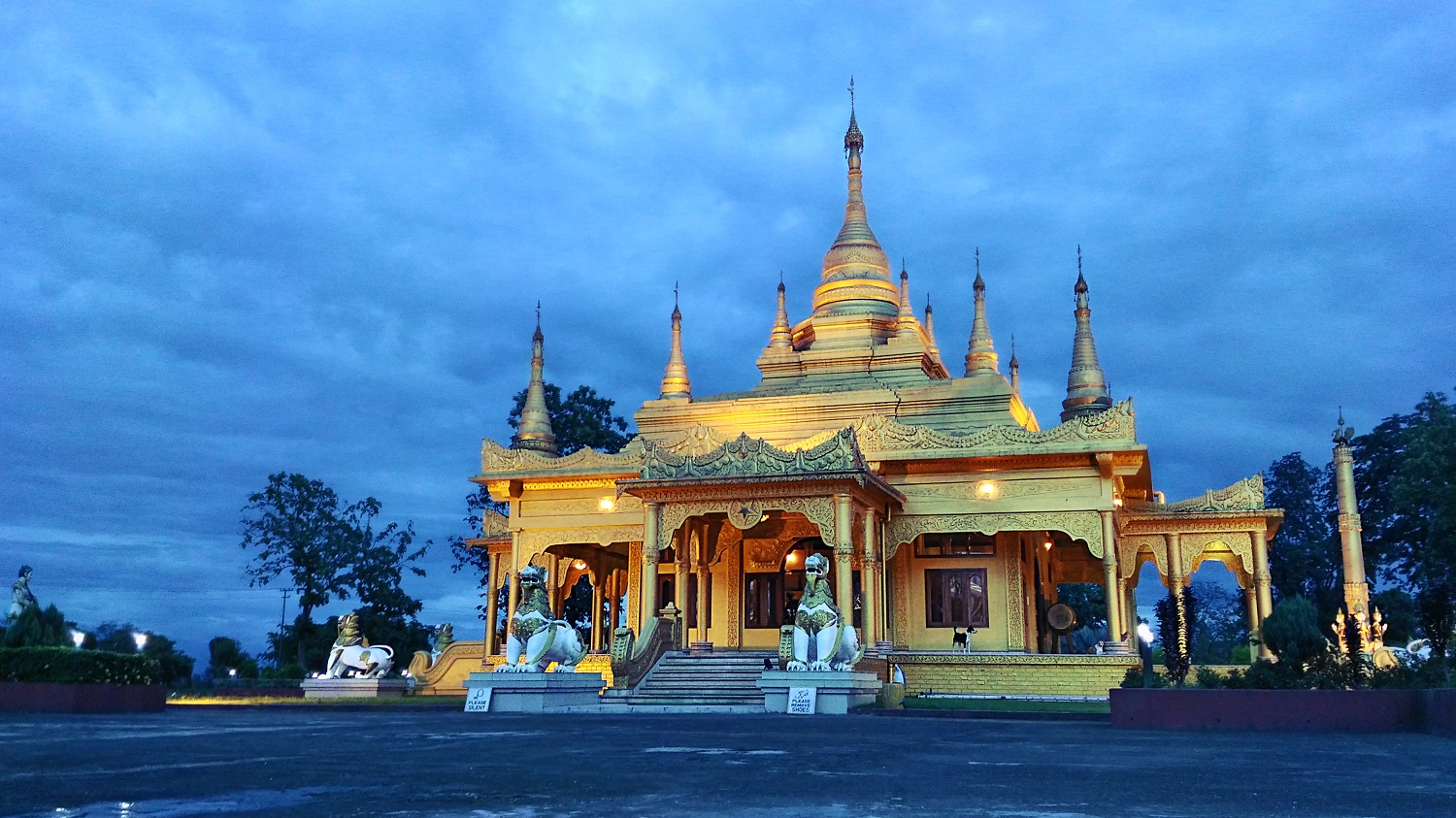
- Golden pagoda in Namsai

- Location in Arunachal Pradesh
- Coordinates (Namsai, India|Namsai): 27.6689°N 95.8714°E
- Country: India
- State: Arunachal Pradesh
- Established: 25 November 2014
- Headquarters: Namsai

Government
  - Lok Sabha constituencies: Arunachal East
  - Vidhan Sabha constituencies: 46. Chowkham (ST); 47. Namsai (ST); 48. Lekang (ST)

Area
  - Total: 1,587 km^{2} (613 sq mi)

Population (2011)
  - Total: 95,950
  - Density: 60.46/km^{2} (156.6/sq mi)

Demographics
  - Literacy: 54.24%
  - Sex ratio: 984.49
- Time zone: UTC+05:30 (IST)
- Average annual precipitation: 3500-4000 mm
- Website: namsai.nic.in

Namsai district is an administrative district in the state of Arunachal Pradesh in north-east India.It was carved out of Lohit district in November 2014.It was the 18th district of Arunachal Pradesh

== History ==
The plains, foothills and lower hills of the district were part of the Chutia kingdom while the higher hills were inhabited by Mishmis. Later, the Khamti people migrated in the late 18th century and settled in the Namsai plains. The Tengaponia clan of the Deoris (priests of Chutia kingdom) had their temple near the Tengapani river of Namsai.

The creation of Namsai district was approved by the Arunachal Pradesh government of Nabam Tuki on 21 March 2013.

On 25 November 2014, the Namsai subdivision of Lohit district was declared as a new district of Arunachal Pradesh, becoming the 18th district of the state.

== Demographics ==
=== Religion ===
Religion in Namsai (2011)
1. Hinduism (63.2%)
2. Buddhism (22.1%)
3. Christianity (7.06%)
4. Islam (1.91%)
5. Others (5.81%)

== Geographical indication ==
Arunachal Pradesh Khaw Tai (Khamti Rice) was awarded the Geographical Indication (GI) status tag from the Geographical Indications Registry, under the Union Government of India, on 3 October 2023 and is valid until 12 December 2031.

Namsai Organic Spices and Agricultural Producer Company Limited from Lohit, proposed the GI registration of Arunachal Pradesh Khaw Tai (Khamti Rice). After filing the application in December 2021, the rice was granted the GI tag in 2023 by the Geographical Indication Registry in Chennai, making the name "Arunachal Pradesh Khaw Tai (Khamti Rice)" exclusive to the rice grown in the region. It thus became the first rice variety from Arunachal Pradesh and the 3rd type of goods from Arunachal Pradesh to earn the GI tag. The GI tag protects the rice from illegal selling and marketing, and gives it legal protection and a unique identity.
