= 2021 I-League qualifiers =

14th season of the I-League 2nd Division

I-League Qualifiers
- Season: 2020–21
- Dates: 4 – 23 October
- Champions: Rajasthan United
- Promoted: Rajasthan United; Kenkre
- Matches: 22
- Goals: 57 (2.59 per match)
- Top goalscorer: Anwar Ali Jr. (4 goals)
- Highest scoring: Bengaluru United 3–3 Madan Maharaj (8 October 2021); Corbett 1–5 Delhi (9 October 2021); Madan Maharaj 0–6 Delhi (23 October 2021)
- Longest winning run: 4 matches (Delhi)
- Longest unbeaten run: 6 matches (Rajasthan United)
- Longest winless run: 4 matches (ARA, Corbett, Madan Maharaj)
- Longest losing run: 3 matches (ARA, Madan Maharaj)
- Total attendance: 700

The 2021 I-League Qualifiers or Hero I-League Qualifiers 2021 (for sponsorship reasons) was the 14th season of I-League 2nd Division since its establishment in 2008. The league winner secured place in 2021–22 I-League season.

Subrata Dutta, senior vice president of All India Football Federation, and AIFF league committee members held its meeting on 26 June 2021, agreeing that state associations which have conducted a league or qualifying championship, will be eligible to nominate teams for the qualifiers.

Even though states are allowed to nominate two teams, the AIFF said each state association will be represented by just one team in I-League qualifiers. The AIFF has made it clear that only those states which conduct a league will be allowed to nominate a team. At least two states made direct recommendations, but were turned down. AIFF allowed relaxation in case nominated clubs could not meet the financial criteria to play in I-League, if they were promoted.

On 4 December 2021, AIFF barred I-League club Chennai City from participating in 2021–22 season on failing to comply with club licensing regulations, and hence second-placed qualifiers team Kenkre FC was promoted.

== Teams ==
As per AIFF, ten teams will be selected to participate in I-League 2nd Division qualifiers, through State leagues. Only one team among the nominated two teams from each state will be selected.

=== Selection criteria ===
1. State association can nominate up to two teams based on the conducted qualifying tournament in most recent season.
2. Nominated teams shall meet AIFF financial requirements and be liable to complete club licensing criteria.

=== Nominated teams ===
The following teams were nominated by state associations:

1. Vizag FC (Andhra Pradesh)
2. Oil India FC, Elevenstar Club (Assam)
3. Shirsh Bihar United FC (Bihar)
4. Indian Heroes Daman and Diu FC, Young Hearts FC (Daman and Diu)
5. Sports Hostel Cuttack (Odisha)
6. Delhi FC, Garhwal FC (Delhi)
7. Vasco SC (Goa)
8. Gandhinagar FC, ARA FC (Gujarat)
9. Techtro Swades United FC, Shimla FC (Himachal Pradesh)
10. Peerless SC, Bhawanipore FC (West Bengal)
11. Hyderya Sports FC, Downtown Heroes FC (Jammu and Kashmir)
12. Kerala United FC, BASCO Othukkungal (Kerala)
13. FC Bengaluru United, Kickstart FC (Karnataka)
14. Madan Maharaj FC (Madhya Pradesh)
15. Ryntih FC (Meghalaya)
16. Rajasthan United FC, Zinc Football (Rajasthan)
17. Corbett FC (Uttarakhand)
18. PIFA Sports FC, Kenkre FC (Maharashtra)

=== Selected teams ===
Locations of I-League Qualifiers 2021 teams

29 teams were nominated by 18 state associations. Only twelve teams fulfilled the AIFF criteria, and ten teams were accepted for the season. Later AIFF decided to withdraw Hyderya Sports FC, runners up of Jammu & Kashmir Professional League, after finding the bank guarantee submitted by them to be not genuine.

	Region	Qualifying tournament		Selected	City	Position
	Region	Name	Season	Selected	City	Position
1	Karnataka	Bangalore Super Division	2020–21	Bengaluru United	Bangalore	Champions
2	Kerala	Kerala Premier League	2020–21	Kerala United	Malappuram	Semi-final
3	Gujarat	Gandhinagar Premier League	2020-21	ARA	Ahmedabad	Champions
4	Delhi	Delhi Senior Division League	2020-21	Delhi	Delhi	2nd place
5	Rajasthan	R-League A Division	2020-21	Rajasthan United	Bhilwara	2nd place
6	Madhya Pradesh	Madhya Pradesh Premier League	2021	Madan Maharaj	Bhopal	Champions
7	Meghalaya	Shillong Premier League		Ryntih	Shillong	League suspended
8	Maharashtra	MFA Elite Division		Kenkre	Mumbai	League not conducted
9	Uttarakhand	Uttarakhand Super League		Corbett	Rudrapur	League not conducted

== Personnel and kits ==
Team	Manager	Captain	Kit manufacturer	Shirt sponsor
ARA	(India) Vivek Nagul	(Nigeria) Bala Dahir	SEVEN	Amul
Corbett	(India) Caetano Pinho	(India) Subodh Kumar	Nivia Sports	Amenity Sports Academy
Delhi	(India) Surinder Singh	(India) Anwar Ali	Spartan	Spartan
Bengaluru United	(India) Richard Hood	(India) Dharmaraj Ravanan	Six5six Sports	The Organic World
Kenkre	(India) Akhil Kothari	(India) Ali Azhar Delhiwala	Hummel	
Kerala United	(India) Bino George	(India) Arjun Jayaraj	SEGA	Micro Health Laboratories
Madan Maharaj	(India) Amit Kumar Jaiswal	(India) Mehtab Hossain	Rocky Sports	Kamla Devi Public School
Rajasthan United	(India) Vikrant Sharma	(Nigeria) Ali Ola Smith	AIO Sports	MISTK
Ryntih	(India) Wallamkupar Kharpran	(India) Banpynkhrawnam Nongkhlaw	T10 Sports	Samkhamti

== Foreign players ==
Each club could register up to three foreign players in their squad. One of the foreign players had to be from an AFC member nation.

Team	Player 1	Player 2	AFC player
ARA	(Senegal) Hamidou Dieye	(Nigeria) Bala Dahir	(Uzbekistan) Vladislav Nuriev
Corbett	(Panama) Rogelio Juárez	(Nigeria) John Chidi	
Delhi	(Brazil) Sérgio Barboza	(Trinidad and Tobago) Willis Plaza	
Bengaluru United	(Slovenia) Luka Majcen	(Spain) Pedro Manzi	
Kenkre	(Cameroon) Zacharie Mbenda		
Kerala United	(Brazil) Gabriel Lima Silva	(Nigeria) Francis Nwankwo	
Madan Maharaj	(Nigeria) Loveday Enyinnaya	(South Africa) William Twala	
Rajasthan United	(Nigeria) Akeem Abioye		
Ryntih			

== Format ==
The ten participating teams have been divided into two groups of five. They will face each other once in the first league leg.

Teams finishing at the top two group positions will proceed to the Final round, where they will play against each other once in a round-robin format. The team that finishes top after the end of 26 matches, will earn promotion to the Hero I-League 2021–22 season.

26 matches are set to be played in the entire tournament, with 20 of them being in the group stage, while six matches will be played in the Final round.

The total number of teams was reduced to nine, after Hyderya Sports FC was found to have produced fake bank guarantee documents.

== Preliminary round ==
=== Group A ===
Pos	Team	Pld	W	D	L	GF	GA	GD	Pts	Qualification
1	Rajasthan United	3	1	2	0	5	4	+1	5	Qualified for Finals
2	Madan Maharaj	3	1	2	0	5	4	+1	5	Qualified for Finals
3	Ryntih	3	1	0	2	4	4	0	3	
4	Bengaluru United	3	0	2	1	4	6	−2	2	

Source: AIFF

4 October 2021	Rajasthan United	3–2	Ryntih	Bangalore, Karnataka
15:45	Sanyasi 12'; S. Singh 45+1'; Thapa 67'	Report		Stadium: Bangalore Football Stadium; Attendance: 30; Referee: Jamal Mohamed

6 October 2021	Rajasthan United	1–1	Bengaluru United	Bangalore, Karnataka
15:45	S. Singh 78'	Report	Manzi 42'	Stadium: Bangalore Football Stadium; Attendance: 40; Referee: Lakshay

8 October 2021	Bengaluru United	3–3	Madan Maharaj	Bangalore, Karnataka
15:45	Pradhan 69'; Kumar 81'; Vaz 90+4'	Report	Bhowmick 13', 52'; Murmu 90+3'	Stadium: Bangalore Football Stadium; Attendance: 30; Referee: C. R. Srikrishna

11 October 2021	Ryntih	0–1	Madan Maharaj	Bangalore, Karnataka
15:45		Report	Enyinnaya 90'	Stadium: Bangalore Football Stadium; Attendance: 20; Referee: R Kannan

13 October 2021	Madan Maharaj	1–1	Rajasthan United	Bangalore, Karnataka
15:45	Murmu 12'	Report	Musharaf 90+4'	Stadium: FSV Arena; Attendance: 0 Referee: Surojit Das

13 October 2021	Bengaluru United	0–2	Ryntih	Bangalore, Karnataka
15:45		Report	Sohktung 29'; Challam 77'	Stadium: Bangalore Football Stadium; Attendance: 40; Referee: Lakshay

=== Group B ===
Pos	Team	Pld	W	D	L	GF	GA	GD	Pts	Qualification
1	Delhi	4	4	0	0	11	2	+9	12	Qualified for Finals
2	Kenkre	4	2	1	1	4	3	+1	7	Qualified for Finals
3	Kerala United	4	2	0	2	7	5	+2	6	
4	Corbett	4	0	2	2	2	8	−6	2	
5	ARA	4	0	1	3	3	9	−6	1	

Source: AIFF

5 October 2021	Kerala United	1–2	Kenkre	Bangalore, Karnataka
12:30	Valiyattu 48'	Report	Fernandez 65' (pen.); Pandre 72'	Stadium: Bangalore Football Stadium; Attendance: 20; Referee: Surojit Das

5 October 2021	Corbett	1–1	ARA	Bangalore, Karnataka
15:45	Patil 15'	Report	Nuriev 75'	Stadium: Bangalore Football Stadium; Attendance: 30; Referee: Suresh Devaraj

7 October 2021	Delhi	3–0	ARA	Bangalore, Karnataka
12:30	Temuri 29'; Barboza 36'; Thingnam 60'	Report		Stadium: Bangalore Football Stadium; Attendance: 40; Referee: Ramachandran Venkatesh

7 October 2021	Kerala United	2–0	Corbett	Bangalore, Karnataka
15:45	Mohammedali 41'; Thonikkara 83'	Report		Stadium: Bangalore Football Stadium; Attendance: 30; Referee: V Eshwar Rao

9 October 2021	Corbett	1–5	Delhi	Bangalore, Karnataka
12:30	Chidi 13'	Report	Plaza 45+2'; Ali Jr. 75', 90+5'; Shadap 89'; Bohham 90'	Stadium: Bangalore Football Stadium; Attendance: 15; Referee: Mrutyunjay Amatya

9 October 2021	ARA	1–2	Kenkre	Bangalore, Karnataka
15:45	Dahir 70'	Report	Noorani 14'; Mhatre 66'	Stadium: Bangalore Football Stadium; Attendance: 40; Referee: Ranjita Devi Tekcham

12 October 2021	Kenkre	0–0	Corbett	Bangalore, Karnataka
12:30		Report		Stadium: Bangalore Football Stadium; Attendance: 10; Referee: Suresh Devaraj

12 October 2021	Delhi	2–1	Kerala United	Bangalore, Karnataka
15:45	Ali Jr. 48'; Jangra 61'	Report	Dhath 23'	Stadium: Bangalore Football Stadium; Attendance: 50; Referee: C. R. Srikrishna

14 October 2021	ARA	1–3	Kerala United	Bangalore, Karnataka
12:30	Shaikh 83'	Report	Nwankwo 46', 51'; Mohammedali 90+4'	Stadium: Bangalore Football Stadium; Attendance: 25; Referee: Jamal Mohamed

14 October 2021	Kenkre	0–1	Delhi	Bangalore, Karnataka
15:45		Report	Bohham 2'	Stadium: Bangalore Football Stadium; Attendance: 20; Referee: Mrutyunjay Amatya

== Finals ==
=== Standings ===
Pos	Team	Pld	W	D	L	GF	GA	GD	Pts	Qualification
1	Rajasthan United (C)	3	2	1	0	3	0	+3	7	Promotion to 2021–22 I-League
2	Kenkre	3	1	2	0	2	1	+1	5	Promotion to 2021–22 I-League
3	Delhi	3	1	1	1	7	2	+5	4	
4	Madan Maharaj	3	0	0	3	0	9	−9	0	

Source: AIFF
(C) Champions

=== Matches ===
18 October 2021	Kenkre	1–0	Madan Maharaj	Bangalore, Karnataka
12:30	Raju 85'	Report		Stadium: Bangalore Football Stadium; Attendance: 20; Referee: Ramachandran Venkatesh

18 October 2021	Delhi	0–1	Rajasthan United	Bangalore, Karnataka
15:45		Report	Thapa 90+2'	Stadium: Bangalore Football Stadium; Attendance: 40; Referee: Surojit Das

20 October 2021	Delhi	1–1	Kenkre	Bangalore, Karnataka
12:30	Barboza 79' (pen.)	Report	Pandhare 56'	Stadium: Bangalore Football Stadium; Attendance: 40; Referee: Jamal Mohamed

20 October 2021	Madan Maharaj	0–2	Rajasthan United	Bangalore, Karnataka
15:45		Report	Chhetri 88'; Hp. Singh 90+4'	Stadium: Bangalore Football Stadium; Attendance: 20; Referee: V Eshwar Rao

23 October 2021	Madan Maharaj	0–6	Delhi	Bangalore, Karnataka
11:30		Report	Barboza 6' (pen.); Mali 20', 22'; Gagandeep 57', 64'; Ali Jr. 73'	Stadium: Bangalore Football Stadium; Attendance: 40; Referee: Surojit Das

23 October 2021	Rajasthan United	0–0	Kenkre	Bangalore, Karnataka
15:00		Report		Stadium: Bangalore Football Stadium; Attendance: 100; Referee: Ramachandran Venkatesh

== Statistics ==
=== Top scorers ===
Rank	Player	Club	Goals
1	(India) Anwar Ali Jr.	Delhi	4
2	(Brazil) Sérgio Barboza	Delhi	3
3	(India) Shubham Bhowmick	Madan Maharaj	2
3	(India) Sukjit Singh	Rajasthan United	2
3	(India) Jiten Murmu	Madan Maharaj	2
3	(India) Sheen Stevenson Sohktung	Ryntih	2
