= 2024–25 Indian State Leagues =

2024–25 season in the state football leagues of India

State leagues in India
- Season: 2024–25
- Dates: 25 June 2024 – 27 July 2025

The 2024–25 Indian State leagues season represented the fifth tier of the Indian football league system, a series of state-level football tournaments played as qualifiers to determine teams for the 2025–26 I-League 3.

== Overview ==
Zone	State	League	Teams	League dates	Duration (months)	Champions	Runners-up	I-League 3 qualification
North	Delhi	2024–25 Delhi Premier League	12	26 Sep 2024–24 Mar 2025	6	CISF Protectors	Garhwal Heroes	Royal Rangers
North	Punjab	2024–25 Punjab State Super League	12	25 July 2024–1 Apr 2025	9	Namdhari	Punjab	-
North	Rajasthan	2024–25 R-League A Division	11	7 Apr 2025–31 May 2025	2	Zinc FA	Royal FC Jaipur	Zinc FA
Northeast
Northeast	Assam	Assam State Premier League	11	2 Apr–10 June 2025	2	Chhaygaon	Elevenstar	Chhaygaon
Northeast	Manipur	Manipur State League	19	1 Feb 2025–8 Apr 2025	2	YPHU	Sang-Gai Heroes	-
Northeast	Manipur	Manipur Premier League	18	27 Apr 2025–27 July 2025	3	FC Raengdai	Asufii FA	FC Raengdai
Northeast	Mizoram	2024–25 Mizoram Premier League	8	9 July–15 Oct 2024	3	Aizawl	Mizoram Police	-
Northeast	Sikkim	SFA A Division S-League	8	5 Sep 2024–13 Feb 2025	5	Sikkim Police	Sikkim Brotherhood	Sikkim Brotherhood
Northeast	Sikkim	Sikkim Premier League	9	10 Apr–16 May 2025	1	Sikkim Aakraman	Singling SC	-
Northeast	Nagaland	2025 Nagaland Super League	7	28 Jan 2025–1 Apr 2025	2	Barak	Longterok	-
Northeast	Meghalaya	2024 Meghalaya State League	24	26 Oct 2024–1 Feb 2025	3	Mawlai	Shillong Lajong	Mawlai
East
East	Odisha	2024 FAO League	8	28 July–18 Sep 2024	2	Sunrise Club	Rovers Club	Sunrise Club; Samaleswari
East	West Bengal (Kolkata)	2024–25 Calcutta Premier Division	26	25 June 2024–18 Feb 2025	7	East Bengal	Diamond Harbour	-
East	Chhattisgarh	2025 Chhattisgarh Football League	8	17 Jan–30 Mar 2025	2.5	SECR Bilaspur	New Friends Dantewada	New Friends Dantewada
West	Goa	2024–25 Goa Professional League	14	21 Sep 2024–2 May 2025	7	Sporting Goa	Dempo	CD Salgaocar
West	Gujarat	Gujarat SFA Club Championship	10	19 Oct 2024–20 Mar 2025	5	ARA	Charutar Vidya Mandal	ARA
West	Madhya Pradesh	Madhya Pradesh Premier League	9	26 Oct 2024–14 Jan 2025	3	Lakecity FC	BLG The Diamond Rock	BLG The Diamond Rock
West	Maharashtra	2024–25 Maharashtra State Senior Men's Football League	8	10 May–14 June 2025	1	MMS Solapur	MYJ-GMSC	Mumbay
West	Mumbai	2024–25 Mumbai Premier League	18	13 Oct 2024–13 Apr 2025	6	India On Track	MYJ-GMSC	-
South	Karnataka (Bengaluru)	2024–25 Bangalore Super Division	18	7 Oct 2024–20 Feb 2025	5	FC Agniputhra	Kickstart	FC Agniputhra
South	Andhra Pradesh	2025 AP Super Cup	8	20–27 Mar 2025	8 days	Godavari FC	Kolleru FC	Citadel Godavari Legends
South	Kerala	2024–25 Kerala Premier League	14	27 Jan–12 May 2025	3.5	Muthoot FA	Kerala Police	-

== Northeastern leagues ==
=== Assam ===
Semifinals
A1	Elevenstar Club	1
B2	Green Valley	0
A2	United Chirang Duar	1
B1	Chhaygaon FC	2

Finals
A1	Elevenstar Club	0
B1	Chhaygaon FC	4

=== Mizoram ===
Pos	Team	Pld	W	D	L	GF	GA	GD	Pts	Qualification or relegation
1	Aizawl (C)	14	10	4	0	44	10	+34	34	Advance to Semi-finals
2	Chanmari	14	9	4	1	31	12	+19	31	Advance to Semi-finals
3	Mizoram Police	14	5	4	5	35	25	+10	19	Advance to Semi-finals
4	Sihphir Venghlun (R)	14	6	1	7	22	36	−14	19	Advance to Semi-finals
5	Ramhlun Athletic (R)	14	4	4	6	25	32	−7	16	
6	SYS	14	4	4	6	17	22	−5	16	
7	Chawnpui	14	4	3	7	12	23	−11	15	
8	FC Bethlehem (R)	14	1	2	11	20	46	−26	5	Relegation to the Mizoram First Division

Source: Away End
Rules for classification: 1) Points; 2) Head-to-head points; 3) Goal difference
(C) Champions; (R) Relegated

Semi-Finals
1	Aizawl FC	2	1	3
4	Sihphir Venghlun	0	0	0
2	Chanmari FC	1	0	1
3	Mizoram Police	2	0	2

Finals
1	Aizawl FC	1
2	Mizoram Police	0

=== Nagaland ===
Pos	Team	Pld	W	D	L	GF	GA	GD	Pts	Qualification
1	Barak (C)	12	9	2	1	26	9	+17	29	Advanced to Match 2
2	Nagaland United	12	6	3	3	22	9	+13	21	Advanced to Match 2
3	Longterok (R)	12	5	5	2	17	13	+4	20	Advanced to Match 1
4	27 United	12	4	4	4	22	28	−6	16	Advanced to Match 1
5	Sechü Zubza	12	4	3	5	23	23	0	15	
6	Red Scars	12	2	4	6	10	17	−7	10	
7	Frontier Warriors	12	1	1	10	18	39	−21	4	

Source: Nagaland Super League
(C) Champions; (R) Runners-up

Match 2
27 March
1	Barak (p)	1 (3)
2	Nagaland United	1 (1)
Match 1
25 March
3	Longterok	2
4	27 United	1

Match 3
30 March
2	Nagaland United	0
3	Longterok (a.e.t.)	1

Final
1 April
1	Barak	3
3	Longterok	1

== Northern leagues ==
=== Delhi ===
Pos	Team	Pld	W	D	L	GF	GA	GD	Pts	Qualification or relegation
1	CISF Protectors	22	14	5	3	44	14	+30	47	Champions
2	Garhwal Heroes FC	22	13	5	4	48	23	+25	44	Eligible for I-League 3
3	Royal Rangers FC	22	13	4	5	54	19	+35	43	
4	Sudeva Delhi FC	22	12	6	4	52	18	+34	42	
5	Delhi FC	22	11	5	6	49	26	+23	38	
6	Tarun Sangha FC	22	8	5	9	37	42	−5	29	
7	Hindustan FC	22	9	2	11	27	36	−9	29	
8	National United SC	22	9	1	12	34	44	−10	28	
9	Vatika FC	22	7	5	10	34	36	−2	26	
10	Friends United FC	22	6	3	13	27	53	−26	21	
11	Indian Air Force	22	5	4	13	24	56	−32	19	
12	United Bharat FC	22	2	1	19	15	78	−63	7	

Source: The Away End
Rules for classification: 1) points; 2) goal difference; 3) number of goals scored

=== Punjab ===
Pos	Team	Pld	W	D	L	GF	GA	GD	Pts	Qualification or relegation
1	Namdhari FC^{IL} (C)	22	13	5	4	43	25	+18	44	Champions
2	Punjab FC^{ISL}	22	12	4	6	38	21	+17	40	
3	International FC	22	12	3	7	38	25	+13	39	
4	Dalbir Football Academy	22	11	5	6	30	22	+8	38	
5	Punjab Police FC	22	10	6	6	32	28	+4	36	
6	Young FC	22	10	5	7	28	23	+5	35	
7	Olympian Jarnail FA	22	9	4	9	37	36	+1	31	
8	BSF FC	22	8	5	9	30	31	−1	29	
9	Kehar SC (R)	22	7	8	7	25	27	−2	29	Relegation to Punjab State Second Division
10	CRPF FC (R)	22	5	5	12	20	39	−19	20	Relegation to Punjab State Second Division
11	Doaba United FC (R)	22	3	4	15	17	38	−21	13	Relegation to Punjab State Second Division
12	JCT Academy (R)	22	3	4	15	26	49	−23	13	Relegation to Punjab State Second Division

Source: The Away End
Rules for classification: 1) points; 2) goal difference; 3) number of goals scored
(C) Champions; (R) Relegated

=== Rajasthan ===
Pos	Team	Pld	W	D	L	GF	GA	GD	Pts	Qualification
1	Zinc Football	20	16	2	2	70	6	+64	50	Champions and Eligible for 2025–26 I-League 3
2	Royal FC Jaipur	20	15	2	3	54	14	+40	47	
3	Brothers United	20	15	2	3	48	11	+37	47	
4	Jaipur Elite	20	13	1	6	101	20	+81	40	
5	ASL FC	20	10	0	10	36	34	+2	30	
6	Sunrise FC	20	9	1	10	54	35	+19	28	
7	Jethri FC	20	8	3	9	42	33	+9	27	
8	Rising Jaipur FC	20	4	3	13	22	92	−70	15	
9	Real Jaipur FC	20	4	2	14	33	48	−15	14	
10	City Wolves	20	4	1	15	15	61	−46	13	
11	Rising Rajasthan FC	20	3	1	16	12	133	−121	10	

Updated to match(es) played on 31 May 2025. Source: The Away End
Archived

== Eastern leagues ==
=== Odisha ===
2024 FAO League

=== West Bengal ===
Pos	Team	Pld	W	D	L	GF	GA	GD	Pts	Qualification
1	East Bengal^{ISL} (C)	17	15	2	0	52	7	+45	47	Champions
2	Diamond Harbour^{IL2}	17	12	3	2	39	14	+25	39	
3	Bhawanipore	17	11	3	3	38	13	+25	36	
4	Calcutta Customs	17	8	5	4	32	25	+7	29	
5	Suruchi Sangha	17	8	4	5	23	22	+1	28	
6	Mohammedan^{ISL}	17	7	5	5	33	20	+13	26	

Source: The Away End
Rules for classification: 1) points; 2) goal difference; 3) number of goals scored; 4) head-to-head points; 5) head-to-head goal difference; 6) fair play ranking; 7) drawing of lots
(C) Champions

== Western leagues ==
=== Goa ===
Pos	Team	Pld	W	D	L	GF	GA	GD	Pts	Qualification
1	Sporting Goa^{IL2}	20	14	4	2	52	19	+33	46	Champions
2	Dempo^{IL}	20	14	3	3	41	15	+26	45	
3	CD Salgaocar	20	12	5	3	39	16	+23	41	Eligible for I-League 3
4	Geno SC	20	11	3	6	42	26	+16	36	
5	FC Goa B^{ISL}	20	11	2	7	41	24	+17	35	
6	SESA^{IL3}	20	9	6	5	31	19	+12	33	
7	Cortalim Villagers	20	6	8	6	31	27	+4	26	
8	Goa Police^{INST}	20	6	2	12	25	52	−27	20	

Source: Goa Professional League Official The Away End - Goa Pro League
Rules for classification: 1) points; 2) goal difference; 3) number of goals scored

=== Gujarat ===
Pos.	Team	P	W	D	L	GF	GA	GD	Pts.	Status
1	ARA	18	15	1	2	51	9	+42	46	Champions & eligible for IL3
2	Charutar Vidya Mandal	18	13	1	4	50	18	+32	40	
3	Gandhinagar	18	11	5	2	41	16	+25	38	
4	RBI	18	10	3	5	44	26	+18	33	
5	Suryavanshi	18	8	2	8	40	33	+7	26	
6	Income Tax SRC	18	6	3	9	27	38	–11	21	
7	Godhra	18	6	3	9	21	36	–15	21	
8	Karnavati	18	4	3	11	22	38	–16	15	
9	SAG FA	18	3	1	14	14	52	–38	10	Qualified for 2026 Qualifiers
10	Kickjack FC	18	3	0	15	17	61	–44	9	Qualified for 2026 Qualifiers

Source: The Away End

=== Maharashtra ===
Pos	Team	Pld	W	D	L	GF	GA	GD	Pts	Qualification
1	Magic Made Soccer	14	11	3	0	54	4	+50	36	Champions
2	MYJ–GMSC^{IL2}	14	10	2	2	48	6	+42	32	
3	Maharashtra Oranje	14	9	2	3	54	9	+45	29	
4	Navi Mumbai SA	14	6	2	6	34	25	+9	20	
5	AIYFA Skyhawks	14	5	4	5	35	19	+16	19	
6	Snigmay Pune	14	5	3	6	36	32	+4	18	
7	Milan SB Foundation	14	0	2	12	5	67	−62	2	
8	Ratnagiri Pioneers	14	0	2	12	4	108	−104	2	

Source: The Away End Football Counter
Rules for classification: 1) points; 2) goal difference; 3) number of goals scored

=== Mumbai ===
Pos	Team	Pld	W	D	L	GF	GA	GD	Pts	Qualification
1	India On Track (C, P)	9	5	3	1	17	6	+11	18	Champions and 2026 MSSMFL
2	MYJ–GMSC^{IL2}	9	5	2	2	18	7	+11	17	
3	Hope United	9	4	4	1	19	10	+9	16	2026 MSSMFL
4	Mumbay FC	9	4	3	2	19	13	+6	15	2026 MSSMFL
5	Maharashtra Oranje	9	3	5	1	15	13	+2	14	
6	ICL Mumbai	9	3	1	5	21	17	+4	10	
7	Mumbai City B^{ISL}	9	2	4	3	13	19	−6	10	
8	Mumbai Kenkre	9	2	3	4	16	16	0	9	
9	Kalina Rangers	9	2	2	5	10	32	−22	8	
10	CFCI	9	1	1	7	9	24	−15	4	

Source: MFA official The Away End Football Counter
Rules for classification: 1) points; 2) goal difference; 3) number of goals scored
(C) Champions; (P) Promoted

== Southern leagues ==
=== Bengaluru ===
Pos	Team	Pld	W	D	L	GF	GA	GD	Pts	Qualification or relegation
1	FC Agniputhra (C, P)	17	14	0	3	38	19	+19	42	Champions and qualification for 2025–26 I-League 3
2	Kickstart	17	12	4	1	52	12	+40	40	
3	FC Bengaluru United	17	11	5	1	45	13	+32	38	
4	Kodagu FC	17	11	2	4	40	14	+26	35	
5	Bengaluru B	17	10	4	3	48	18	+30	34	
6	South United	17	9	3	5	31	19	+12	30	
7	MEG & C FC	17	8	2	7	22	27	−5	26	
8	HAL SC	17	8	2	7	16	21	−5	26	
9	SC Bengaluru	17	7	4	6	26	17	+9	25	
10	Students Union	17	6	4	7	22	26	−4	22	
11	FC Real Bengaluru	17	4	6	7	19	24	−5	18	
12	Roots FC	17	4	5	8	20	24	−4	17	
13	ASC & C FC	17	4	4	9	18	42	−24	16	
14	Parikrma FC	17	4	2	11	24	37	−13	14	
15	Rebels FC	17	4	2	11	22	36	−14	14	
16	Bangalore Independents	17	3	5	9	17	48	−31	14	Withdrew
17	Bangalore United FC (R)	17	3	2	12	13	38	−25	11	Relegation to 2025-26 BDFA A Division
18	Real Chikkamagaluru (R)	17	1	4	12	11	49	−38	7	Relegation to 2025-26 BDFA A Division

Source: The Away End
Rules for classification: 1) points; 2) goal difference; 3) number of goals scored
(C) Champions; (P) Promoted; (R) Relegated

=== Kerala ===
Pos	Team	Pld	W	D	L	GF	GA	GD	Pts	Qualification
1	KSEB	13	9	3	1	27	12	+15	30	Advance to Semi-finals
2	Kerala Police	13	8	4	1	21	13	+8	28	Advance to Semi-finals
3	Muthoot FA	13	8	3	2	32	10	+22	27	Advance to Semi-finals
4	Wayanad United	13	7	3	3	23	12	+11	24	Advance to Semi-finals
5	Golden Threads	13	7	3	3	28	19	+9	24	
6	Kerala United	13	6	1	6	16	15	+1	19	
7	Gokulam Kerala B	13	5	3	5	19	16	+3	18	
8	Kovalam	13	5	1	7	20	24	−4	16	
9	Kerala Blasters B	13	4	3	6	22	24	−2	15	
10	Real Malabar	13	3	6	4	19	23	−4	15	
11	PFC Kerala	13	4	0	9	16	21	−5	12	
12	Inter Kerala	13	3	2	8	16	21	−5	11	
13	FC Kerala	13	3	1	9	14	43	−29	10	Relegation to the 2025–26 Kerala Premier League 2
14	Devagiri College	13	0	5	8	15	35	−20	5	Relegation to the 2025–26 Kerala Premier League 2

Source: The Away End
Rules for classification: 1) points; 2) goal difference; 3) number of goals scored

Semifinals
2	Kerala Police	1
4	Wayanad Utd	0
1	KSEB	0
3	Muthoot FA	1

Finals
2	Kerala Police	1
3	Muthoot FA	2

== See also ==
- 2024–25 Indian Super League (Tier I)
- 2024–25 I-League (Tier II)
- 2024–25 I-League 2 (Tier III)
- 2024–25 I-League 3 (Tier IV)
- 2025 Super Cup (April)
- 2024 Durand Cup
