= Anwar Ali (footballer, born 2000) =

Indian professional footballer

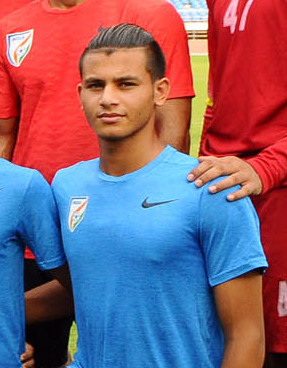
- Ali in 2017

Personal information
- Full name: Anwar Ali
- Date of birth: 28 August 2000 (age 26)
- Place of birth: Chomon, Punjab, India
- Height: 1.79 m (5 ft 10 in)
- Position: Centre-back

Team information
- Current team: East Bengal
- Number: 4

Youth career
- 2015–2017: Minerva Punjab

Senior career*
Years	Team	Apps	(Gls)
2017–2018	Minerva Punjab	0	(0)
2017	→ Indian Arrows (loan)	15	(0)
2018–2020	Mumbai City	0	(0)
2018–2019	→ Indian Arrows (loan)	19	(0)
2019–2020	Mohammedan		
2020–2021	Techtro Swades United		
2021–2024	Delhi	7	(4)
2022–2023	→ Goa (loan)	30	(1)
2023–2024	→ Mohun Bagan (loan)	16	(0)
2024–	East Bengal	26	(6)

International career^{‡}
2015–2017	India U17	8	(0)
2017–2019	India U20	2	(1)
2019	India U23	2	(0)
2022–	India	38	(2)
Medal record
Men's football
Representing India
SAFF Championship
Winner	2023 India
CAFA Nations Cup
Third place	2025 Tajikistan–Uzbekistan	Team
- * Club domestic league appearances and goals as of 19:20, 23 March 2026 (UTC) ‡ National team caps and goals as of 22:00, 6 October 2026 (UTC)

Anwar Ali (Punjabi: ਅਨਵਰ ਅਲੀ; born 28 August 2000) is an Indian professional footballer who plays as a defender for Indian Super League club East Bengal and the India national team.

== Club career ==
Born in Adampur, Punjab, Anwar started to play football at the age of seven for a local club. He started as a striker but later shifted to the defensive line.

=== Minerva Punjab ===
Anwar joined the youth set-up of Minerva Punjab in 2015 and played for the club in different youth level competitions, including the Elite League. His performance at the club earned him national team call-ups.

=== Indian Arrows (loan) ===
After an impressive 2017 FIFA U-17 World Cup campaign, Anwar joined Indian Arrows on a season-long loan from Minerva Punjab ahead of the 2017–18 I-League. He made his professional debut in a 3–0 home win over Chennai City.

=== Mumbai City ===
On 7 August 2018, Anwar joined Indian Super League club Mumbai City on a three-year deal. He was loaned out to Indian Arrows for the 2018–19 I-League. He was named in Mumbai City's squad for the 2019–20 Indian Super League but later withdrew after being diagnosed with a rare heart condition. Later, his contract was terminated on mutual terms and medical grounds.

=== Mohammedan SC ===
On 24 August 2020, Anwar joined Mohammedan for their 2020 I-League Qualifiers, but the AIFF directed the club no not allow him to train with the club, citing his heart condition. Mohammedan chose to release him, considering directions from the top football body, despite a verdict from the Delhi High Court that allowed him to join the club.

=== Techtro Swades United ===
On 23 November 2020, Anwar joined Techtro Swades United of the Himachal Football League on a short-term contract. He appeared twice for the club in the 2020 Himachal Football League.

=== Delhi FC ===
On 21 May 2021, Anwar joined Delhi FC on five-year deal. After being allowed by the AIFF to return to competitive football, he featured in the 2021 Durand Cup and helped Delhi reach the knockout stage. He became the top scorer of the 2021 I-League Qualifiers with four goals from seven appearances.

=== FC Goa ===
On 1 January 2022, Anwar joined Indian Super League club FC Goa on an eighteen-month loan from Delhi FC. He made his debut in a 1–0 home win over Chennaiyin.

=== Mohun Bagan SG ===
On 13 July 2023, Anwar joined Mohun Bagan SG on a four-year loan from Delhi FC.

=== East Bengal FC ===
Anwar terminated his contract with Mohun Bagan on 8 July and after a controversial episode of tussle with the AIFF Players Status Committee (PSC) and his former team Mohun Bagan, Anwar finally received his No Objection Certificate (NOC) and joined East Bengal on a five-year contract. Since his signing, he is evading his punishment by remaining absent from the Delhi High Court along with his lawyer and postponing his hearing every time. Anwar made his debut for East Bengal on 22 September against Kerala Blasters away at Kochi.

== International career ==
=== Youth level ===
In 2015, Anwar was called up for the 2017 FIFA U-17 World Cup preparatory squad of India under-17 after head coach Luís Norton de Matos impressed with his defensive display for Minerva Punjab youth side against India U-17 in a practice match. Two successful years with the national side saw him in the final 21-member squad for the U-17 World Cup, which was hosted in India He started in all of India's group stage matches.

Anwar scored the winner in India U-20's historic 2–1 win against Argentina U-20 in the 2018 COTIF Tournament.

=== Senior debut ===
In May 2019, Anwar was called up for the India senior team national camp but was later sent back after being diagnosed with a rare heart condition.

In March 2022, Anwar was called up for the India squad by coach Igor Štimac for two friendly matches against Bahrain and Belarus. He made his debut on 23 March against Bahrain in a 2–1 defeat. Anwar scored his first international goal on 14 June 2022 against Hong Kong in a 4–0 2023 AFC Asian Cup qualification win.

== Personal life ==
In 2019, Anwar Ali was forbidden from playing football by the AIFF as he was diagnosed with a rare heart disease, namely Hypertrophic cardiomyopathy, where the heart muscle wall becomes abnormally thick and affects the pumping of blood. Later in 2021, Anwar got clearance from the AIFF to play following a Delhi High Court verdict.

== Career statistics ==
=== Club ===
As of match played 16 April 2025

Appearances and goals by club, season and competition
Club	Season	League			Cup (Note: Includes Super Cup)		AFC		Other		Total	
Club	Season	Division	Apps	Goals	Apps	Goals	Apps	Goals	Apps	Goals	Apps	Goals
Minerva Punjab	2017–18	I-League	0	0	0	0	—		—		0	0
Indian Arrows (loan)	2017–18	I-League	15	0	1	0	—		—		16	0
Mumbai City	2018–19	Indian Super League	0	0	0	0	—		—		0	0
Mumbai City	2019–20	Indian Super League	0	0	0	0	—		—		0	0
Indian Arrows (loan)	2018–19	I-League	19	0	2	0	—		—		21	0
Delhi	2021–22	I-League 2nd Division	7	4	0	0	—		4 (Note: Appearance(s) in Durand Cup)	0	11	4
Goa (loan)	2021–22	Indian Super League	10	0	0	0	—		—		10	0
Goa (loan)	2022–23	Indian Super League	20	1	2	0	—		—		22	1
Goa (loan)	Total		30	1	2	0	0	0	—		32	1
Mohun Bagan SG (loan)	2023–24	Indian Super League	16	0	0	0	5 (Note: Appearance(s) in AFC Cup)	2	5	1	26	3
East Bengal	2024–25	Indian Super League	18	0	1	0	3 (Note: Appearance(s) in AFC Challenge League)	1	0	0	22	1
East Bengal	2025–26	Indian Super League	8	3	5	0	—		6 (Note: Five appearances in Durand Cup and One appearance in IFA Shield.)	2	19	5
East Bengal	Total		26	3	6	0	3	1	6	2	41	5
Career total			113	8	11	0	8	3	15	3	147	14

=== International ===
As of 6 October 2026

National team	Year	Apps	Goals
India	2022	8	1
India	2023	10	0
India	2024	7	0
India	2025	9	1
India	2026	4	0
Total		38	2

India score listed first, score column indicates score after each Ali goal

List of international goals scored by Anwar Ali
No.	Date	Venue	Cap	Opponent	Score	Result	Competition
1.	14 June 2022	Vivekananda Yuba Bharati Krirangan, Kolkata, India	6	Hong Kong	1–0	4–0	2023 AFC Asian Cup qualification
2.	29 August 2025	Hisor Central Stadium, Hisor, Tajikistan	28	Tajikistan	1–0	2–1	2025 CAFA Nations Cup

== Honours ==
Mohun Bagan

- Durand Cup: 2023
- Indian Super League Premiership: 2023–24

India

- SAFF Championship: 2023
- Intercontinental Cup: 2023
- Tri-Nation Series: 2023
