= Himanshu Jangra =

Indian footballer

Personal information
- Date of birth: 21 July 2004 (age 22)
- Place of birth: Hisar, Haryana
- Height: 1.80 m (5 ft 11 in)
- Positions: Winger; striker

Youth career
- 2017–2019: Minerva Punjab

Senior career*
Years	Team	Apps	(Gls)
2020	Minerva Punjab B	1	(2)
2020	Minerva Punjab	5	(0)
2020	Mohammedan	1	(0)
2020	Techtro Swades United	4	(5)
2021–2025	Delhi	26	(12)
2022	→ Indian Arrows (loan)	3	(1)
2022–2023	→ East Bengal (loan)	6	(0)
2023	→ East Bengal B (loan)	5	(4)

International career
2019	India U15	5	(7)
2019–2021	India U17	9	(8)
2022–2024	India U20	8	(3)
- * Club domestic league appearances and goals as of 21:22, 7 May 2023 (UTC)

Himanshu Jangra (born 21 July 2004) is an Indian professional footballer who plays as a forward.

He was included in The Guardian's "Next Generation" list for 2021 for 2004 batch.

== Club career ==
=== Early life and youth career ===
Himanshu Jangra is a product of Minerva Punjab Academy; he joined Minerva Punjab in 2016 after being selected during a Trial in Chandigarh. But later in 2017 he made a mark in the Hero Sub Junior I League, where he scored an impressive haul of 18 goals which attracted India national team scouts.

The youngster continued his prolific form in the National leagues by scoring 9 goals and helping his team to win the Hero Junior I Leagues 2018-19 title. Later in 2019, Himanshu was adjudged as the Most Valuable Player in the SAFF Under 15 Championship. He scoring two consecutive hattricks and secured gold medal for Team India.

Himanshu featured for Punjab FC's reserves side in the 2020 I-League 2nd Division, where he scored two goals in a solitary appearance against AU Rajasthan F.C. Impressing everyone by his performance, the attacker earned promotion to the senior side playing in the I-League, where he made five appearances at the age of 15.

Jangra was roped in by Kolkata-based professional club Mohammedan S.C. playing in I-League 2nd Division. Later in the year, he signed for Techtro Swades United FC for the 2020 Himachal Football League season. He went to become top scorer of the league, scoring five goals in just four games.

=== Delhi FC ===
On 12 June 2021, he joined DSA Senior Division club Delhi FC. The club participated in 2021 Delhi 2nd Division Qualifiers for qualification to 2021 I-League 2nd division. On 17 July 2021, In his very first match he assisted 3 goals in 7–0 win against Rangers SC. He continued with his spectacular performance and helped Delhi FC remain top and undefeated at the end of Group Stage. He scored his first goal for the club on 31 July in final against Indian Air Force. Though they lost the game on penalties but the club was nominated to play I-League 2nd Division.

He was part of the club's impressive run till Quarter Finals of 2021 Durand Cup including a win against Indian Super League club Kerala Blasters FC. He scored his 2nd and match winning goal for the club in 2–1 win against Kerala United FC in 2021 I-League Qualifiers preliminary round. However Delhi FC failed to qualify for 2021-22 I-League after poor performance in Final stage of qualifiers.

On 7 October 2021, he was included in The Guardians 60 Next Generation players list among the likes of Gavi and others. He was only the second Indian to be named in the list after Bikash Yumnam made it in 2020 list.

=== East Bengal FC ===
On 20 August 2022, he joined Indian Super League club East Bengal FC on loan from Delhi FC.

== International career ==
He represented India U15 in the 2019 SAFF U-15 Championship, where he scored seven goals that included two hat-tricks as he also secured the golden boot in the process. He scored 1 goal in 5–0 win over Turkmenistan in 2020 AFC U-16 Championship qualification

He was named in final squad of India U16 team which was to play in 2020 AFC U-16 Championship in Bahrain but was later cancelled due to the COVID-19 pandemic.

He was also part of India U20 team which won the 2022 SAFF U-20 Championship, Kumar was also chosen as a member for their 2023 AFC U-20 Asian Cup qualification squad. where he scored three goals in five matches including a goal in 5–2 win against Bangladesh U20 in the Final.

== Career statistics ==
=== Club ===
As of 6 August 2023

Club	Season	League			Cup		Others		AFC		Total	
Club	Season	Division	Apps	Goals	Apps	Goals	Apps	Goals	Apps	Goals	Apps	Goals
Minerva Punjab	2019–20	I-League	5	0	0	0	—		—		5	0
Minerva Punjab B	2020	I-League 2nd Division	1	2	0	0	—		—		1	2
Mohammedan	2020	I-League 2nd Division	1	0	0	0	—		—		1	0
Techtro Swades United	2020	Himachal Football League	4	5	0	0	—		—		4	5
Delhi	2020–21	Delhi Football League	6	1	0	0	—		—		6	1
Delhi	2021	I-League 2nd Division	6	1	4 (Note: Appearance(s) in Durand Cup)	0	—		—		10	1
Delhi	2021–22	Delhi Football League	14	10	0	0	—		—		14	10
Delhi	2023–24	I-League	0	0	1	1	—		—		1	1
Delhi	Delhi total		26	12	4	0	0	0	0	0	30	12
Indian Arrows (loan)	2021–22	I-League	3	1	0	0	—		—		3	1
East Bengal (loan)	2022–23	Indian Super League	6	0	2	0	1 (Note: Appearance(s) in Super Cup)	0	—		9	0
East Bengal B (loan)	2022–23	I-League 2	1	0	—		4 (Note: Appearance(s) in Reliance Foundation Development League)	4	—		5	4
Career total			47	20	7	1	5	4	0	0	59	25

== Honours ==
India U15

- SAFF U-15 Championship: 2019

India U20

- SAFF U-20 Championship: 2022

Delhi

- Shaheed Bhagat Singh Cup: 2022
- Ladakh Climate Cup: 2023

Individual

- SAFF U-15 Championship Most Valuable player: 2019
- SAFF U-15 Championship Top scorer: 2019
