= 2022 Himachal Football League =

2nd season of Himachal Football League

Himachal Football League
- Season: 2022
- Dates: 30 April – 15 May
- Champions: Techtro Swades United FC (1st title)
- Biggest win: Himachal FC 9–2 Northern FA
- Highest scoring: Himachal FC 9–2 Northern FA
- Longest winning run: Techtro Swades United (7 wins)
- Longest unbeaten run: Techtro Swades United (11 games)

The 2022 Himachal Football League was the 2nd season of the Himachal Football League, the top-tier league in the Indian state of Himachal Pradesh, organised by Himachal Pradesh Football Association (HPFA).

The 2022 season kicked off on 30 April with 9 teams competing for the title. Unlike the previous season, the league's duration has increased to one month. The format has also been changed to the league format wherein 9 teams are set to play each other twice.

== Teams ==
The following 9 teams participated in the league.

Locations of 2022 Himachal Football League clubs

Club	Location
Hamir Falcons FC	Hamirpur
Himachal FC	Khad
Himalayan FC Kinnaur	Kinnaur
Khad FC	Khad
Northern FA	
Shimla FC	Shimla
Sai Kangra FA	Kangra
Shiva FC	Nadaun
Techtro Swades United FC	Khad

=== Stadiums ===
- Khad Football Ground, Khad
- Nagnuli Ground, Nagnuli

== Regular season ==
Pos	Team	Pld	W	D	L	GF	GA	GD	Pts	Qualification or relegation
1	Techtro Swades United	14	12	1	1	39	5	+34	37	Champions and possible qualification for 2022–23 I-League 2
2	Himachal	17	9	4	4	32	15	+17	31	Possible qualification for 2022–23 I-League 2
3	Khad	13	9	2	2	26	10	+16	29	
4	Hamir Falcons	15	6	5	4	24	23	+1	23	
5	Shimla	12	4	2	6	14	17	−3	14	
6	Sai Kangra	13	4	2	7	14	25	−11	14	
7	Northern	14	4	2	8	15	34	−19	14	
8	Himalayan Kinnaur	11	2	3	6	7	16	−9	9	
9	Shiva	17	1	3	13	10	36	−26	6	

Source: HPFA
Rules for classification: 1) points; 2) goal difference; 3) number of goals scored

== Matches ==
17 April 2022
1

Shiva	1–2	Sai Kangra
	Report

Nagnuli Ground, Nagnuli, Himachal Pradesh, India

17 April 2022
2

Hamir Falcons	2–1	Sai Kangra
	Report

Nagnuli Ground, Nagnuli, Himachal Pradesh, India

17 April 2022
3

Shimla	1–0	Himalayan Kinnaur
	Report

Nagnuli Ground, Nagnuli, Himachal Pradesh, India

19 April 2022
4

Sai Kangra	2–1	Shimla
	Report

Nagnuli Ground, Nagnuli, Himachal Pradesh, India

19 April 2022
5

Hamir Flacons	1–1	Shiva
	Report

Nagnuli Ground, Nagnuli, Himachal Pradesh, India

21 April 2022
6

Hamir Flacons	1–0	Shimla
	Report

Nagnuli Ground, Nagnuli, Himachal Pradesh, India

30 April 2022
7

Shimla	2–0	Himalayan Kinnaur
	Report

Khad Football Ground, Khad, Himachal Pradesh, India

30 April 2022
8

Techtro Swades United	2–0	Sai Kangra
	Report

Khad Football Ground, Khad, Himachal Pradesh, India

30 April 2022
9

Himachal	1–1	Hamir Falcons
	Report

Nagnuli Ground, Nagnuli, Himachal Pradesh, India

1 May 2022
10

Khad	1–0	Northern
	Report

Khad Football Ground, Khad, Himachal Pradesh, India

1 May 2022
11

Techtro Swades United	4–0	Himalayan Kinnaur
	Report

Khad Football Ground, Khad, Himachal Pradesh, India

1 May 2022
12

Himachal	2–0	Shiva
	Report

Khad Football Ground, Khad, Himachal Pradesh, India

3 May 2022
13

Hamir Falcons	2–1	Himalayan Kinnaur
	Report

Khad Football Ground, Khad, Himachal Pradesh, India

4 May 2022
14

Himachal	2–0	Northern
	Report

Khad Football Ground, Khad, Himachal Pradesh, India

4 May 2022
15

Techtro Swades United	4–0	Shimla
to	Report

Khad Football Ground, Khad, Himachal Pradesh, India

4 May 2022
16

Khad	1–2	Shiva
	Report

Khad Football Ground, Khad, Himachal Pradesh, India

5 May 2022
16

Sai Kangra	0–0	Northern
	Report

Khad Football Ground, Khad, Himachal Pradesh, India

5 May 2022
17

Shiva	1–1	Himalayan Kinnaur
	Report

Khad Football Ground, Khad, Himachal Pradesh, India

6 May 2022
18

Himachal	1–1	Khad
	Report

Khad Football Ground, Khad, Himachal Pradesh, India

6 May 2022
19

Techtro Swades United	1–0	Hamir Falcons
	Report

Khad Football Ground, Khad, Himachal Pradesh, India

7 May 2022
20

Northern	1–2	Himalayan Kinnaur
	Report

Khad Football Ground, Khad, Himachal Pradesh, India

7 May 2022
21

Sai Kangra	1–6	Khad
	Report

Khad Football Ground, Khad, Himachal Pradesh, India

8 May 2022
22

Techtro Swades United	1–0	Himachal
	Report

Khad Football Ground, Khad, Himachal Pradesh, India

8 May 2022
23

Northern	3–2	Shiva
	Report

Khad Football Ground, Khad, Himachal Pradesh, India

8 May 2022
24

Khad	3–1	Hamir Falcons
	Report

Khad Football Ground, Khad, Himachal Pradesh, India

9 May 2022
25

Himachal	1–2	Hamir Falcons
	Report

Khad Football Ground, Khad, Himachal Pradesh, India

10 May 2022
26

Northern	0–0	Himalayan Kinnaur
	Report

Khad Football Ground, Khad, Himachal Pradesh, India

10 May 2022
27

Himachal	2–1	Shimla
	Report

Khad Football Ground, Khad, Himachal Pradesh, India

10 May 2022
28

Khad	2–3	Techtro Swades United
	Report

Khad Football Ground, Khad, Himachal Pradesh, India

11 May 2022
29

Himalayan Kinnaur	2–0	Sai Kangra
	Report

Khad Football Ground, Khad, Himachal Pradesh, India

11 May 2022
30

Northern	0–2	Hamir Falcons
	Report

Khad Football Ground, Khad, Himachal Pradesh, India

12 May 2022
31

Techtro Swades United	3–0	Sai Kangra
	Report

Khad Football Ground, Khad, Himachal Pradesh, India

12 May 2022
31

Khad	2–0	Shiva
	Report

Khad Football Ground, Khad, Himachal Pradesh, India

13 May 2022
32

Himachal	2–0	Himalayan Kinnaur
	Report

Khad Football Ground, Khad, Himachal Pradesh, India

13 May 2022
33

Techtro Swades United	7–0	Northern FA
	Report

Khad Football Ground, Khad, Himachal Pradesh, India

14 May 2022
34

Khad	1–0	Shimla
	Report

Khad Football Ground, Khad, Himachal Pradesh, India

15 May 2022
35

Sai Kangra	0–0	Himachal
0	Report

Khad Football Ground, Khad, Himachal Pradesh, India

15 May 2022
36

Techtro Swades United	2–0	Shiva
	Report

Khad Football Ground, Khad, Himachal Pradesh, India

== See also ==
- 2021–22 Punjab State Super Football League
- 2021–22 FD Senior Division
