= 2025 Nagaland Super League =

Nagaland Super League
- Season: 2024–25
- Dates: 28 January – 1 April
- Champions: Barak (1st title)
- Matches: 46
- Goals: 148 (3.22 per match)

The 2025 Nagaland Super League was the inaugural season of the Nagaland Super League, the men's professional franchise football league in Nagaland, India. It was organised by the Nagaland Football Association.

== Clubs ==
Locations of the NSL clubs

Club	City	Stadium	Capacity
Barak	Peren	Chümoukedima Football Stadium	5,000
Longterok	Mokokchung	Chümoukedima Football Stadium	5,000
Nagaland United	Chümoukedima	Chümoukedima Football Stadium	5,000
Red Scars	Dimapur	Chümoukedima Football Stadium	5,000
Sechü Zubza	Sechü Zubza	Indira Gandhi Stadium	20,000
Frontier Warriors	Tuensang	Indira Gandhi Stadium	20,000
27 United	Kohima	Indira Gandhi Stadium	20,000

== League table ==
Pos	Team	Pld	W	D	L	GF	GA	GD	Pts	Qualification
1	Barak (C)	12	9	2	1	26	9	+17	29	Advanced to Match 2
2	Nagaland United	12	6	3	3	22	9	+13	21	Advanced to Match 2
3	Longterok (R)	12	5	5	2	17	13	+4	20	Advanced to Match 1
4	27 United	12	4	4	4	22	28	−6	16	Advanced to Match 1
5	Sechü Zubza	12	4	3	5	23	23	0	15	
6	Red Scars	12	2	4	6	10	17	−7	10	
7	Frontier Warriors	12	1	1	10	18	39	−21	4	

Source: Nagaland Super League
(C) Champions; (R) Runners-up

== Playoffs ==
=== Bracket ===
Match 2
27 March
1	Barak (p)	1 (3)
2	Nagaland United	1 (1)
Match 1
25 March
3	Longterok	2
4	27 United	1

Match 3
30 March
2	Nagaland United	0
3	Longterok (a.e.t.)	1

Final
1 April
1	Barak	3
3	Longterok	1

=== Final ===
1 April 2025
19:30 IST
Fnal

Barak	3–1	Longterok
Mangkholen 52'; Toka Achumi 66'; Ngamminlun Melvin 85'	Report	Kakhevi Assumi 90+6'

Chümoukedima Football Stadium, Chümoukedima

== Awards ==
NSL Awards Night 2025

Award	Recipient	Club
The William Koso Award (Best Coach)	Khogen Singh	Nagaland United
Best Defender	Benrithung Humtsoe	Barak
Best Striker	Nisede Peseyie	Nagaland United
Golden Glove	Dziesengulie Kire	Barak
Golden Boot	Toka Achumi	Barak
Golden Star	Namang Yimong	Longterok
Golden Ball	Kevisanyu Peseyie	Barak
Best Midfielder	Cornelius Laldinsang Pudaite	Longterok
Fairplay Award		Frontier Warriors
Best Goal	Kunozo Venyo	27 United
Best Social Media		Barak
