= 2019 Rajasthan State Men's League =

Rajasthan State Men's League
- Season: 2019
- Champions: JECRC FC (1st title)
- Matches: 25
- Goals: 105 (4.2 per match)
- Longest winless run: Ajmer FC

The 2019 Rajasthan State Men's League was the 1st season of the top tier state level football league in the Indian state of Rajasthan conducted by Rajasthan Football Association starting from 20 September 2019 with 8 participating teams and concluded on 6 October 2019. JECRC FC become 1st champions. All matches were played on single venue Rajasthan University Sports Complex.

== Teams ==
- Ajmer FC
- AU Rajasthan
- JECRC FC
- Mewar FC
- Neerja Modi FA
- Playspace FC
- Poornima Panthers
- Zinc Football Academy

== Standings ==
Pos	Team	Pld	W	D	L	GF	GA	GD	Pts	Qualification or relegation
1	JECRC FC	7	6	0	1	29	7	+22	18	Champions
2	AU Rajasthan	7	5	0	2	20	8	+12	15	
3	Zinc Football Academy	7	5	0	2	15	4	+11	15	
4	Neerja Modi FA	7	5	0	2	17	9	+8	15	
5	Mewar FC	7	4	0	3	17	14	+3	12	
6	Playspace FC	7	2	0	5	15	26	−11	6	
7	Poornima Panthers	7	1	0	6	6	24	−18	3	
8	Ajmer FC	7	0	0	7	5	32	−27	0	

Source: indiafooty.com
Rules for classification: 1) Points; 2) Goal difference; 3) Goals scored;

== Matches ==
20 September 2019	Mewar FC	2-3	Zinc FA	Jaipur
				Stadium: Rajasthan University Sports Complex

20 September 2019	Ajmer FC	1-7	JECRC FC	Jaipur
				Stadium: Rajasthan University Sports Complex

20 September 2019	AU Rajasthan FC	3-0	Neerja Modi FC	Jaipur
				Stadium: Rajasthan University Sports Complex

20 September 2019	Playspace FC	5-0	Poornima Panthers	Jaipur
				Stadium: Rajasthan University Sports Complex

22 September 2019	AU Rajasthan FC	1-2	JECRC FC	Jaipur
				Stadium: Rajasthan University Sports Complex

22 September 2019	Ajmer FC	0-3	Zinc FA	Jaipur
				Stadium: Rajasthan University Sports Complex

22 September 2019	Playspace FC	3-4	Mewar FC	Jaipur
				Stadium: Rajasthan University Sports Complex

22 September 2019	Neerja Modi FC	1-0	Poornima Panthers	Jaipur
				Stadium: Rajasthan University Sports Complex

24 September 2019	Neerja Modi FC	2-1	JECRC FC	Jaipur
				Stadium: Rajasthan University Sports Complex

24 September 2019	Ajmer FC	1-5	AU Rajasthan FC	Jaipur
				Stadium: Rajasthan University Sports Complex

24 September 2019	Mewar FC	3-1	Poornima Panthers	Jaipur
				Stadium: Rajasthan University Sports Complex

24 September 2019	Zinc FA	3-0	Playspace FC	Jaipur
				Stadium: Rajasthan University Sports Complex

30 September 2019	Neerja Modi FC	5-0	Zinc FA	Jaipur
				Stadium: Rajasthan University Sports Complex

30 September 2019	Ajmer FC	0-3	Mewar FC	Jaipur
				Stadium: Rajasthan University Sports Complex

30 September 2019	JECRC FC	3-0	Poornima Panthers	Jaipur
				Stadium: Rajasthan University Sports Complex

30 September 2019	AU Rajasthan FC	5-0	Playspace FC	Jaipur
				Stadium: Rajasthan University Sports Complex

2 October 2019	Playspace FC	1-11	JECRC FC	Jaipur
				Stadium: Rajasthan University Sports Complex

2 October 2019	Neerja Modi FC	7-0	Ajmer FC	Jaipur
				Stadium: Rajasthan University Sports Complex

2 October 2019	Mewar FC	0-1	AU Rajasthan FC	Jaipur
				Stadium: Rajasthan University Sports Complex

2 October 2019	Zinc FA	3-0	Poornima Panthers	Jaipur
				Stadium: Rajasthan University Sports Complex

4 October 2019	JECRC FC	1-0	Zinc FA	Jaipur
				Stadium: Rajasthan University Sports Complex

4 October 2019	Ajmer FC	1-4	Playspace FC	Jaipur
				Stadium: Rajasthan University Sports Complex

4 October 2019	AU Rajasthan FC	7-2	Poornima Panthers	Jaipur
				Stadium: Rajasthan University Sports Complex

4 October 2019	Neerja Modi FA	2-3	Mewar FC	Jaipur
				Stadium: Rajasthan University Sports Complex

6 October 2019	Playspace FC	2-4	Neerja Modi FC	Jaipur
				Stadium: Rajasthan University Sports Complex

6 October 2019	Poornima Panthers	3-2	Ajmer FC	Jaipur
				Stadium: Rajasthan University Sports Complex

6 October 2019	JECRC FC	4-2	Mewar FC	Jaipur
				Stadium: Rajasthan University Sports Complex

6 October 2019	AU Rajasthan FC	0-3	Zinc FA	Jaipur
				Stadium: Rajasthan University Sports Complex
