= 2023–24 R-League A Division =

4th season of R-League A Division

Rajasthan State Men's League
- Season: 2023–24
- Dates: 8 March, 2024 – 28 May, 2024
- Champions: Jaipur Elite
- Matches played: 72
- Goals scored: 262 (3.64 per match)
- Biggest home win: Jaipur Elite 6-0 ASL FC (15 Mar 2024); Zinc Football 6-0 Royal FC Jaipur (15 May 2024); Zinc Football 6-0 ASL FC (20 May 2024)
- Biggest away win: Champion Maker Club 0-13 Zinc Football (24 Apr 2024)
- Highest scoring: Champion Maker Club 0-13 Zinc Football (24 Apr 2024)
- Longest winning run: 8 matches Brothers United
- Longest unbeaten run: 13 matches Jaipur Elite; Zinc Football
- Longest winless run: 12 matches ASL FC
- Longest losing run: 8 matches ASL FC; Champion Maker Club

The 2023–24 R-League A Division was the 4th season of the Rajasthan State Men's League, the first professional league in the Indian state of Rajasthan. It is organised by the Rajasthan Football Association.

== Teams ==
A total of 9 teams participated in the league.

| Club | City/Town | Stadium |
|---|---|---|
| ASL FC | Jaipur | Royal FC Stadium |
| Aviva Sports Foundation | Udaipur | Thorasi Sikar |
| FC Brothers United | Jaipur | Jiem |
| Champion Maker Club | Ajmer | Mayo College |
| Jaipur Elite | Jaipur | Royal FC Stadium |
| Jaipur Futsal | Jaipur | Jiem |
| Royal FC Jaipur | Jaipur | Royal FC Stadium |
| Sunrise FC | Sirohi | Royal FC Stadium |
| Zinc Football | Udaipur | Zawar Stadium |

== Standings ==
=== League table ===
| Pos | Team | Pld | W | D | L | GF | GA | GD | Pts | Qualification |
|---|---|---|---|---|---|---|---|---|---|---|
| 1 | Jaipur Elite (C) | 16 | 13 | 2 | 1 | 53 | 6 | +47 | 41 | Eligible for 2024–25 I-League 3 |
| 2 | Brothers United | 16 | 12 | 2 | 2 | 45 | 7 | +38 | 38 | |
| 3 | Zinc Football | 16 | 11 | 3 | 2 | 61 | 15 | +46 | 36 | |
| 4 | Aviva Sports Foundation | 16 | 10 | 4 | 2 | 41 | 15 | +26 | 34 | |
| 5 | Royal FC Jaipur | 16 | 5 | 3 | 8 | 19 | 33 | −14 | 18 | |
| 6 | Jaipur Futsal | 16 | 3 | 3 | 10 | 9 | 31 | −22 | 12 | |
| 7 | Sunrise FC | 16 | 2 | 4 | 10 | 13 | 45 | −32 | 10 | |
| 8 | ASL FC | 16 | 2 | 2 | 12 | 13 | 55 | −42 | 8 | |
| 9 | Champion Maker Club | 16 | 2 | 1 | 13 | 8 | 55 | −47 | 7 | |

Updated to match(es) played on 28 May 2024. Source:
(C) Champions

=== Results by games ===
| Team ╲ Round | 1 | 2 | 3 | 4 | 5 | 6 | 7 | 8 | 9 | 10 | 11 | 12 | 13 | 14 | 15 | 16 |
|---|---|---|---|---|---|---|---|---|---|---|---|---|---|---|---|---|
| ASL FC | L | L | L | L | L | L | L | L | D | L | D | L | W | L | L | W |
| Aviva Sports Foundation United | D | W | W | D | W | W | W | W | W | L | L | W | W | W | D | D |
| Brothers United | D | L | W | W | W | W | W | W | W | W | L | W | W | W | W | D |
| Champion Maker Club | L | W | L | L | L | L | L | L | L | L | D | L | W | L | L | L |
| Jaipur Elite | W | W | W | W | W | D | W | W | W | D | W | W | W | L | W | W |
| Jaipur Futsal | D | W | L | W | L | L | L | L | L | L | L | W | D | D | L | L |
| Royal FC Jaipur | L | L | L | W | W | L | L | W | D | D | L | W | D | L | W | L |
| Sunrise FC | D | L | L | L | W | L | L | D | L | D | W | D | L | L | L | L |
| Zinc Football | L | W | L | W | W | W | W | W | W | D | W | W | W | W | D | D |

Updated to match(es) played on 28 May 2024. Source:
W = Win; D = Draw; L = Lose
