= Yan Law =

Indian football manager (born 1992)

Personal information
- Full name: Yan Cheng Law
- Date of birth: 24 December 1992 (age 33)
- Place of birth: Kolkata, West Bengal, India

Youth career
- West Bengal U19

Senior career*
Years	Team	Apps	(Gls)
2006-2012	George Telegraph	124	(28)

International career
2008-2010	India U19	28	(4)

Managerial career
- 2012–2014: Calcutta United
- 2014–2016: Punjab
- 2016-2017: Mohammedan
- 2017-2018: Techtro Swades United
- 2018-2019: Aizawl
- 2019-2020: Biratnagar City
- 2020–2021: Delhi
- 2021-2022: Aizawl
- 2022–2023: Druk Lhayul
- 2023–2025: Delhi
- 2025–2026: United Kolkata
- * Club domestic league appearances and goals

Yan Cheng Law (born 24 December 1992) is an Indian professional football coach and former footballer. He also represented India at the youth level internationally.

== Playing career ==
Law played for the school team of La Martinière Calcutta, and went on to play in the lower tiers of the Calcutta Football League. He got called up for the West Bengal U19 team for the B.C. Roy Trophy at the age of 14 and eventually went on to represent the India U19 team.

== Managerial career ==
At the age of 18, while playing for George Telegraph in the Calcutta league, Law was forced to take the D coaching License course by Joydeep Mukherjee, one of the George Telegraph officials, who saw potential in him to become a coach. Despite being made fun of by older men at the course, he eventually obtained the license. However, upon returning to George Telegraph, he was excluded from the team, so turned to coaching full-time with the help of his father.

=== Calcutta United ===
Law was appointed head coach of Calcutta United Club in the lowest division of Calcutta at the age of 20 through owner Joydeep Mukherjee, who forced him to take his first courses.

By age 26, Law had obtained the AFC A License, the youngest coach to do so.

=== Minerva Punjab ===
In 2019, Law was appointed head coach of Minerva Punjab in the I-League after impressing owner Ranjit Bajaj while Head of Youth Development at Mohammedan.

=== Mohammedan ===
On 31 July 2020, Yan Law was appointed as the head coach of Mohammedan SC. On 11 October 2020, he parted ways with Mohammedan SC.

=== Techtro Swades United ===
On 14 November 2020, Yan Law was appointed as the head coach of Techtro Swades United FC. He led the club to runners-up spot in their maiden tournament of Himachal Football League.

=== Biratnagar City ===
On 1 April 2021, Yan Law was appointed as the head coach of Biratnagar City FC. He led the club to sixth spot in their maiden tournament of Nepal Super League.

=== Aizawl ===
"The club always wants to promote the players of the state of Mizoram and players from the academy, which is fantastic and which I also strongly believe in. If I was also a club owner, I would love to promote the same what Aizawl FC is doing and they are doing a fantastic job. They are the factory of Mizoram football. I am really blessed to be working with such a bunch of talented youngsters. It is a young squad and for them to be performing under this pressure, at this age, is a great experience that many people do not get. It's not easy for these youngsters to cope with but I think they've been doing a good job and I am really happy to be part of Aizawl FC."

— —Yan Law, on his days with Aizawl FC.

On 19 January 2021, Law moved to Aizawl as manager. Under his guidance, the team achieved eighth place in 2021–22 I-League season. He parted ways with Aizawl in June 2022.

=== Druk Lhayul ===
In June 2022, Law was appointed as new head coach of Bhutan Premier League club Druk Lhayul FC.

=== Delhi ===
In 2023, Law was appointed as the new head coach of I-League club Delhi.

== Personal life ==
Law is of Chinese heritage, his great grandfather had immigrated to Calcutta. His family previously owned Kim Wah, a Chinese restaurant that was well known in the 1970s and 1980s.

== Honours ==
=== Player ===
Bengal U19

- B.C. Roy Trophy: 2003–04

=== Manager ===
Delhi

- Ladakh Climate Cup: 2023
