= 2025–26 R-League A Division =

6th season of R-League A Division

Rajasthan State Men's League
- Season: 2025–26
- Dates: 20 March, 2026 – 30 April, 2026
- Champions: Zinc Football (3rd title)
- Matches: 42
- Goals: 181 (4.31 per match)
- Top goalscorer: (India) Amit Kumar (3 Goals)
- Biggest home win: Sunrise FC 11-2 Jethri FC (29 March 2026)
- Biggest away win: Jethri FC 2-6 Zinc Football (20 March 2026); Jethri FC 2-6 Sunrise FC (19 April 2026)
- Highest scoring: Sunrise FC 11-2 Jethri FC (29 March 2026)
- Longest winning run: 9 matches Zinc Football
- Longest unbeaten run: 9 matches Zinc Football
- Longest winless run: 12 matches Rihan Football Academy
- Longest losing run: 6 matches Rihan Football Academy

2025–26 R-League A Division League was the sixth season of R-League A Division, the top tier of football in the state of Rajasthan. Zinc Football were the defending champions. The season began on 20 March 2026 and concluded on 30 April 2026.

== Teams ==
The league featured 7 teams playing 12 matches in a home and away format.

Club	City/Town
ASL FC	Jaipur
Brothers United	Jaipur
Jaipur City FC	Jaipur
Jethri FC	Sikar
Rihan Football Academy	Ajmer
Sunrise FC	Sirohi
Zinc Football	Udaipur

== League table ==
Pos	Team	Pld	W	D	L	GF	GA	GD	Pts	Qualification
1	Zinc Football	12	10	1	1	39	6	+33	31	Champions
2	Jaipur City FC	12	8	1	3	35	16	+19	25	
3	Brothers United	12	7	2	3	28	19	+9	23	
4	Sunrise FC	12	5	3	4	32	25	+7	18	
5	ASL FC	12	5	2	5	20	18	+2	17	
6	Jethri FC	12	2	0	10	21	56	−35	6	
7	Rihan Football Academy	12	0	1	11	6	41	−35	1	

=== Fixtures and results ===
Home \ Away	ASL	BRO	JCY	JFC	RFA	SFC	ZFA
ASL FC	—	1–1	1–1	4–0	5–0	0–2	0–3
Brothers United	3–0	—	0–2	6–4	3–0	5–1	1–3
Jaipur City FC	1–0	4–1	—	4–2	6–0	5–0	0–2
Jethri FC	2–4	2–3	0–5	—	2–0	2–6	2–6
Rihan Football Academy	1–3	0–2	2–5	1–3	—	2–4	0–4
Sunrise FC	1–2	2–2	4–1	11–2	0–0	—	0–0
Zinc Football	3–0	0–1	4–1	6–0	4–0	4–1	—

Legend: Blue = home team win; Yellow = draw; Red = away team win.

=== Results by games ===
Team ╲ Round	1	2	3	4	5	6	7	8	9	10	11	12
ASL FC	W	D	W	L	L	W	L	L	W	L	D	W
Brothers United	W	D	W	L	W	D	W	W	L	L	W	W
Jaipur City FC	W	L	W	W	W	L	W	W	W	W	L	D
Jethri FC	L	L	L	L	W	L	L	L	L	L	W	L
Rihan Football Academy	L	L	L	L	L	D	L	L	L	L	L	L
Sunrise FC	L	D	W	W	D	D	W	L	L	W	L	W
Zinc Football	W	D	L	W	W	W	W	W	W	W	W	W

W = Win; D = Draw; L = Lose
