= 2020 Himachal Football League =

1st season of Himachal Football League

Himachal Football League
- Season: 2020
- Dates: 25 November – 4 December
- Champions: Himachal FC (1st title)
- Matches: 19
- Goals: 64 (3.37 per match)
- Biggest home win: Himachal FC 5–0 Summer Hill United
- Biggest away win: Shahpur FC 0–6 Sai Kangra
- Highest scoring: Shahpur FC 1–6 Techtro Swades United
- Longest winning run: Techtro Swades United (4 wins)
- Longest unbeaten run: Techtro Swades United (4 games)
- Longest winless run: Paonta United (4 games)
- Longest losing run: Paonta United (4 losses)
- Total attendance: N/A
- All statistics correct as of 2 December 2020.

The 2020 Himachal Football League was the 1st season of the Himachal Football League, the top-tier league in the Indian state Himachal Pradesh, organised by Himachal Pradesh Football Association (HPFA).

The inaugural season kicked off on the 25 November 2020, with 10 teams competing for the maiden title. The 10 teams were divided into two groups of 5, with the table toppers from each group advancing to the final.

== Teams ==
A total of 10 teams participated in the league.

Club
Himachal FC
Khad FC
Paonta United FC
Sai Kangra FA
Shahpur FC
Shimla FC
Shiva FC
Summer Hill United FC
Techtro Swades United FC
Venga Boys Kullu FC

== League table ==
=== Group A ===
Pos	Team	Pld	W	D	L	GF	GA	GD	Pts	Qualification
1	Techtro Swades United	4	4	0	0	13	2	+11	12	Final
2	Sai Kangra FC	4	3	0	1	14	3	+11	9	
3	Shiva FC	4	2	0	2	7	5	+2	6	
4	Shahpur FC	4	1	0	3	4	15	−11	3	
5	Paonta United	4	0	0	4	1	14	−13	0	

Updated to match(es) played on 25 November 2020. Source:
Rules for classification: Group stage tiebreakers

25 November 2020
9:00 IST

Paonta United	1–5	Sai Kangra
	Report

Khad Football Ground, Una
Attendance: 0

25 November 2020
15:00 IST

Shiva FC	1–2	Techtro Swades United
	Report	Jayananda Singh; Himanshu Jangra

Khad Football Ground, Una
Attendance: 0

26 November 2020
12:00 IST

Paonta United	0–3 (walkover)	Shahpur FC

Khad Football Ground, Una
Attendance: 0

27 November 2020
12:00 IST

Sai Kangra	3–0	Shiva FC
Mangat 45+3', 76'; Vikas 82'

Khad Football Ground, Una
Attendance: 0

28 November 2020
15:00 IST

Paonta United	0–3 (walkover)	Shiva FC

Khad Football Ground, Una
Attendance: 0

28 November 2020
12:00 IST

Shahpur FC	1–6	Techtro Swades United
		Shaiza; Ekombong; Himanshu Jangrax2; Ranbirx2

Khad Football Ground, Una
Attendance: 0

29 November 2020
15:00 IST

Shahpur FC	0–6	Sai Kangra

Khad Football Ground, Una
Attendance: 0

30 November 2020
9:00 IST

Techtro Swades United	3–0 (walkover)	Paonta United

Khad Football Ground, Una
Attendance: 0

1 December 2020
12:00 IST

Shiva FC	3–0	Shahpur FC

Khad Football Ground, Una
Attendance: 0

2 December 2020
15:00 IST

Sai Kangra	0–2	Techtro Swades United
		Himanshu Jangrax2

Khad Football Ground, Una
Attendance: 0

=== Group B ===
Pos	Team	Pld	W	D	L	GF	GA	GD	Pts	Qualification
1	Himachal FC	4	3	0	1	11	1	+10	9	Final
2	Shimla FC	4	2	1	1	5	3	+2	7	
3	Venga Boys Kullu FC	4	2	1	1	7	7	0	7	
4	Khad FC	4	1	0	3	3	7	−4	3	
5	Summer Hill United	4	1	0	3	5	13	−8	3	

Rules for classification: Group stage tiebreakers

25 November 2020
12:00 IST

Shimla FC	2–0	Khad FC

Khad Football Ground, Una
Attendance: 0

26 November 2020
9:00 IST

Himachal FC	4–0	Venga Boys Kullu FC

Khad Football Ground, Una
Attendance: 0

26 November 2020
15:00 IST

Khad FC	2–0	Summer Hill United

Khad Football Ground, Una
Attendance: 0

27 November 2020
15:00 IST

Venga Boys Kullu	0–0	Shimla FC

Khad Football Ground, Una
Attendance: 0

28 November 2020
15:00 IST

Himachal FC	2–0	Khad FC

Khad Football Ground, Una
Attendance: 0

29 November 2020
9:00 IST

Summer Hill United	3–2	Shimla FC

Khad Football Ground, Una
Attendance: 0

30 November 2020
12:00 IST

Himachal FC	5–0	Summer Hill United

Khad Football Ground, Una
Attendance: 0

30 November 2020
15:00 IST

Khad FC	1–3	Venga Boys Kullu

Khad Football Ground, Una
Attendance: 0

1 December 2020
15:00 IST

Shimla FC	1–0	Himachal FC
	Report

Khad Football Ground, Una
Attendance: 0

2 December 2020
12:00 IST

Venga Boys Kullu	V	Sumer Hill United

Khad Football Ground, Una
Attendance: 0

== Final ==
Himachal FC from group B were the first team to enter final of the inaugural edition of Himachal Football League.

4 December 2020
14:00 IST

Techtro Swades United	0–2	Himachal FC
		Mohit Sharma; Sadananda Singh

Khad Football Ground, Una
Attendance: 0
