= 2022 R-League A Division =

2nd season of R-League A Division

Rajasthan State Men's League
- Season: 2022
- Dates: 10 August – 1 September
- Champions: Jaipur Elite
- Matches: 36
- Goals: 152 (4.22 per match)
- Top goalscorer: Aman Khan (8 goals); Zinc FA

The 2022 R-League A Division is the 3rd season of the Rajasthan State Men's League, the first professional league in the Indian state of Rajasthan. It is organised by the Rajasthan Football Association. The stadium used for all games was the Poornima University Ground.

== Teams ==
A total of 9 teams participated in the league.

Club	City/Town	Head Coach	Shirt Sponsor
Jaipur United	Jaipur		
Brothers United	Jaipur	Philip Shebs	Bulls&Bears Inc.
Jaipur Elite	Jaipur	Shiv Pratap Singh	AIO Sports
Neerja Modi FA	Jaipur	Kuldeep Kumar	
Rajasthan United	Bhilwara	Vikrant Sharma	Fire 1on1
Royal FC Jaipur	Jaipur		
City Wolves			
Sunrise			
Delisha			

== Standings ==
	Team	Pld	W	D	L	GF	GA	GD	Pts	
1	Jaipur Elite	8	6	2	0	20	8	12	20	Champions and nominated to I-League 3
2	Jaipur United	8	6	0	2	34	5	29	18	
3	Royal FC Jaipur	8	5	2	1	19	8	11	17	
4	Rajasthan United	8	5	1	2	23	11	12	16	
5	Neerja Modi FA	8	3	0	5	18	24	-6	9	
6	Brothers United	8	2	2	4	6	12	-6	8	
7	Delisha	8	2	1	5	13	25	-12	7	
8	Sunrise	8	2	1	5	14	29	-15	7	
9	City Wolves	8	0	1	7	5	30	-25	1	
