= 2021–22 Madhya Pradesh Premier League =

2nd season of R-League A Division

Madhya Pradesh Premier League
- Season: 2021
- Dates: 3 – 25 October
- Champions: Eagles FC (1st title)

The 2021–22 Madhya Pradesh Premier League was the 2nd season of the Madhya Pradesh Premier League, the first professional league in the Indian state of Madhya Pradesh. It is organised by the Madhya Pradesh Football Association.

The 2nd season kicked off on the 3 October 2021, with 12 teams competing for the title and qualification for the I-League 2nd Division. The 12 teams were divided into two groups. teams played once against each other in a round-robin format. 2 teams from each group qualified for the Super Four round where they played once against each other. Top 2 teams of the Super Four round Sehore Boys and Eagles FC played in the final.

Eagles FC won the final and crowned champions of the league.

== Teams ==
Club	City/Town	Head Coach	Shirt Sponsor
Barwani FC	Barwani		
Bharti FC	Jabalpur		
Chamunda FC	Dewas		
Eagles FC	Neemuch		
Khel Evam Yuva Kalyan FC	Chindwada		
Lions Club	Jabalpur		
Madan Maharaj FC	Bhopal		
Ratlam City FC	Ratlam		
Sehore Boys FC	Sehore		
SWS Shivaji FC	Betul		
Social Warrior FC	Betul		
The Diamond Rock FA	Balaghat		

== Group stage ==
=== Group A ===
Team	Pld	W	D	L	GF	GA	GD	Pts	
Ratlam City FC	5	4	0	1	9	5	+4	12	Qualified for Super Four
Sehore Boys FC	5	3	1	1	19	3	+16	10	Qualified for Super Four
Chamunda FC	5	3	1	1	19	5	+14	10	
Lions Club	5	2	0	3	10	4	+6	4	
SWS Shivaji FC	5	2	0	3	7	19	-12	4	
Khel Evem Yuva Kalyan	5	0	0	5	2	30	-28	0	

=== Group B ===
Team	Pld	W	D	L	GF	GA	GD	Pts	
The Diamond Rock FA	5	5	0	0	18	2	+16	15	Qualified for Super Four
Eagles FC	5	4	0	1	19	3	+16	12	Qualified for Super Four
Madan Maharaj FC	5	3	0	2	8	8	0	9	
Bharti FC	5	2	0	3	9	13	-4	6	
Barwani FC	5	1	0	4	5	14	-9	3	
Social Warrior FC	5	0	0	5	0	19	-19	0	

== Super Four ==
Team	Pld	W	D	L	GF	GA	GD	Pts	
Sehore Boys FC	3	3	0	0	8	2	+6	9	Qualified for Final
Eagles FC	3	1	0	2	2	2	0	3	Qualified for Final
The Diamond Rock FA	3	1	0	2	3	4	-1	3	
Ratlam City FC	3	1	0	2	1	6	-5	3	

=== Final ===
2 November 2021	Sehore Boys FC	0–1	Eagles FC
