= Khwetelhi Thopi =

Indian footballer

Personal information
- Place of birth: Phek, Nagaland, India

Team information
- Current team: Nagaland United (head coach)

Senior career*
Years	Team	Apps	(Gls)
- Life Sports
2013	Kohima Komets		
2013	Veda		
2014–2016	Rangdajied United		
2016	→ Aizawl (loan)	2	(0)
2017	Naga		
2017	Barak		
2018	Khriekesa		
2018–2024	Kohima Eagles		
- * Club domestic league appearances and goals

Khwetelhi Thopi is an Indian former professional footballer who played as a winger.

== Career ==
Born in the Phek district in Nagaland, Thopi started playing football at the village and school level. In 2012, Thopi played for Life Sports in local tournaments and the Nagaland Premier League. After spending time with Life Sports, Thopi played for Kohima Komets and Veda in 2013. He also represented Nagaland in the Santosh Trophy three times. In 2014, Thopi signed with Shillong-based side Rangdajied United on a five-month contract. While playing for the club, Thopi also turned out for various local teams in Nagaland.

On 25 February 2016, it was announced that Thopi would move to newly promoted I-League side Aizawl for the remainder of the 2015–16 season. Thopi made his professional debut in the Indian first division three days later on 28 February against Bengaluru FC. He came on as an 82nd-minute substitute as Aizawl lost the match 1–0. On 22 August 2016, Thopi made his return to Rangdajied United by scoring a goal for the side as they were defeated by Shillong Lajong in the first match of the Shillong Premier League. After the Shillong Premier League season, Thopi returned to his native Nagaland and played for various clubs including Naga, Barak, Khriekesa, and Kohima Eagles.

== Career statistics ==
As of 7 May 2016

Club	Season	League			League cup		Domestic cup		Continental		Total	
Club	Season	Division	Apps	Goals	Apps	Goals	Apps	Goals	Apps	Goals	Apps	Goals
Aizawl	2015–16	I-League	2	0	—	—	—	—	—	—	2	0
