= TT Nagar Sports Complex =

Multi-purposed stadium in Madhya Pradesh, India

TT Nagar Stadium
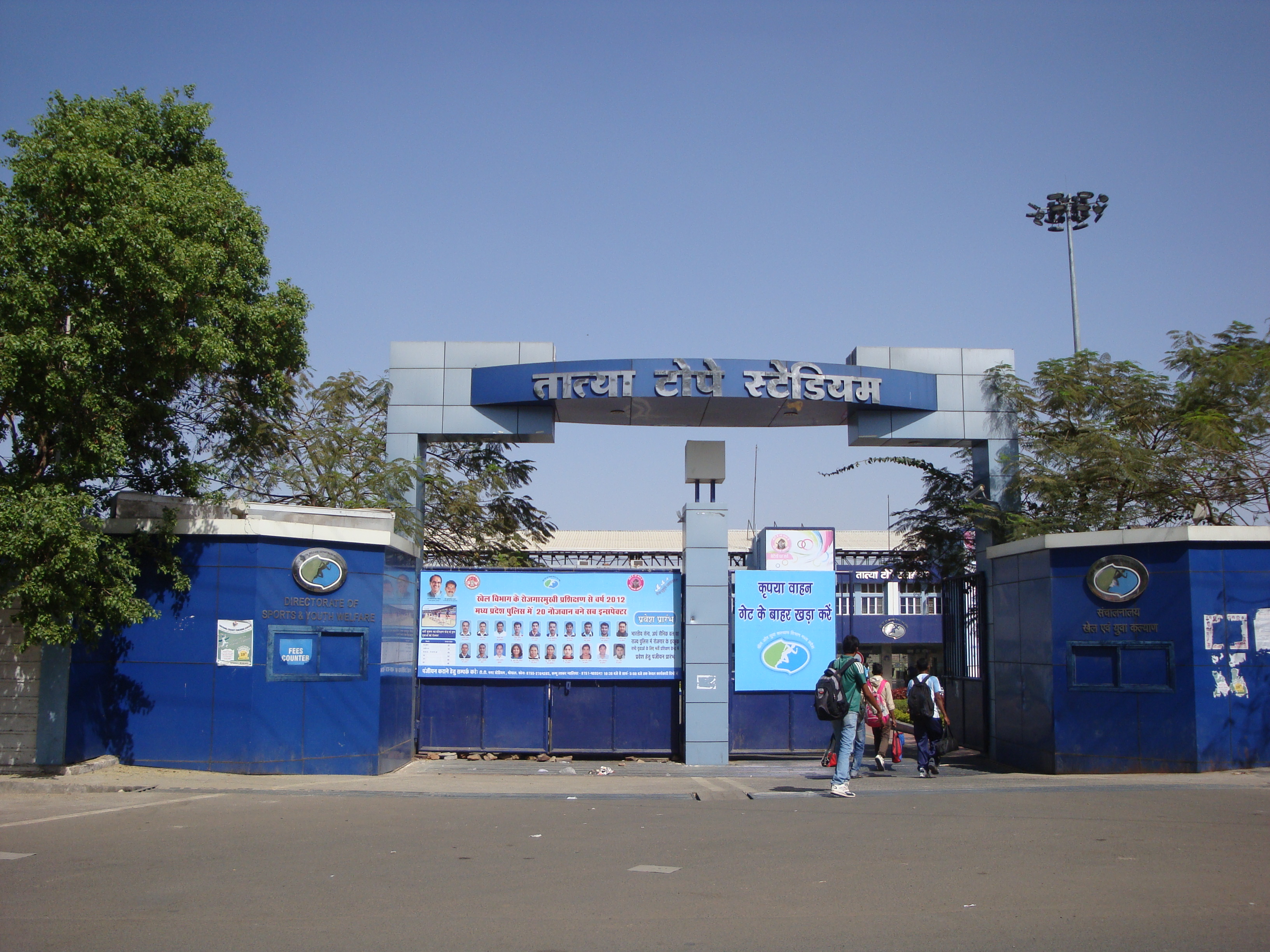
- Tatya Tope Nagar Stadium entrance
- Interactive map of TT Nagar Stadium
- Full name: Tatya Tope Nagar Sports Complex
- Location: Bhopal, Madhya Pradesh
- Coordinates: 23°13′52″N 77°23′59″E
- Owner: Government of Madhya Pradesh
- Operator: Directorate of Sports & Youth Welfare Department
- Capacity: 20,000

Construction
- Opened: 1962
- Renovated: 2013

Tenant
- Madhya Pradesh Premier League (selected matches)

Website
- www.dsywmp.gov.in

Tatya Tope Nagar Sports Complex, also known as TT Nagar Stadium, is a multi-purpose stadium in Bhopal, Madhya Pradesh, India. It also has indoor hall and an Olympic swimming pool among the facilities offered. Football, athletics, volleyball, hockey, basketball, badminton, cricket, handball, futsal, table tennis, judo, taekwondo, and wrestling are among the sports that can be played there.

The ground hosted its only first-class cricket match in 1982 between Madhya Pradesh cricket team and Vidarbha cricket team where home team won by 202 runs.

== See also ==
- Lake City FC
- Madan Maharaj FC
