= Maharaja Umaid Singh Stadium =

Sports venue in Jodhpur, India

Coordinates: 26.29062°N 73.02985°E

Umaid Singh Stadium
- Interactive map of Umaid Singh Stadium
- Full name: Maharaja Shri Umaid Singh Stadium
- Location: Jodhpur, India
- Owner: Rajasthan Government
- Operator: Government of Rajasthan
- Capacity: 20,000
- Surface: Grass
- Scoreboard: Yes
- Acreage: 14,850 m^{2} (159,800 sq ft)

Construction
- Built: 1932
- Opened: 1932

Tenant
- R-League A Division

Maharaja Umaid Singh Stadium, formerly known as the Umaid Sports Stadium, is a multipurpose stadium situated in the Paota suburb of Jodhpur, Rajasthan.The sports complex is built in 1932 headed by Maharaja of Jodhpur Umaid Singh as a sports ground. It is mostly used for political rallies, cultural activities and sporting events.

== History ==
Maharaja Umaid Singh Stadium was built by that time Maharaja Umaid Singh in 1932 as a sports ground. It is the oldest stadium in the city of Jodhpur.

Rajasthan Government announced 2 crore budget to renovate the stadium and make a shooting range. Currently a state level association football academy is running the stadium.

A football club from Jaipur, AU Rajasthan FC borrowed the stadium for their I-League 2nd division matches. Now it is owned by Govt of Rajasthan which uses it for various purposes.
