= 2012 Nagaland Premier League =

Nagaland Premier League
- Season: 2012
- Champions: Barak Flamingoz
- Matches played: 90
- Goals scored: 271 (3.01 per match)
- Top goalscorer: Thangtinlen Haokip (25 goals)
- Longest unbeaten run: Naga Tornados (18 games)

The 2012 Nagaland Premier League was the inaugural season of the Nagaland Premier League, a state league in the Indian state of Nagaland. The league kicked off on 10 March 2012.

== Overview ==
The Nagaland Premier League was started in 2012 as a new top state league for the state of Nagaland which is located in India. The league is considered to be the 3rd tier of the Indian football league system. The league has been started with the aim of giving the youth of Nagaland a stepping stone to become professional in the game of association football and is run by Four Four Two management. The league started the 2012 season with 10 teams based in 6 different districts. On 17 October 2011 it was announced that the Nagaland Premier League champions would be promoted to the I-League 2nd Division.

=== Exhibition Match ===
The NPL kicked off on 2 March with an exhibition match between Life Sports FC and I-League side Shillong Lajong F.C. at the Kohima football ground. . Shillong Lajong won 4-0 over Life Sports FC.

== Venues ==
Kohima, Dimapur and Mokokchung were selected as venues for opening season.

== Teams ==
| Club | District |
|---|---|
| Dimapur United | Dimapur |
| Doyang | Wokha |
| Dynamic | Dimapur |
| Flamingoz | Peren |
| Kohima Komets | Kohima |
| Life Sports | Kohima |
| Naga Tornados | Zunheboto |
| New Market | Kohima |
| Sangpang | Mokokchung |
| Zonipang | Mokokchung |

== League table ==
| Team | Pld | W | D | L | GF | GA | GD | Pts | Champion |
|---|---|---|---|---|---|---|---|---|---|
| Barak Flamingoz | 18 | 14 | 2 | 2 | 45 | 9 | +36 | 44 | Champion |
| Naga Tornados | 18 | 12 | 6 | 0 | 50 | 10 | +40 | 42 | |
| Dimapur United | 18 | 13 | 1 | 4 | 38 | 10 | +28 | 40 | |
| Life Sports | 18 | 10 | 4 | 4 | 38 | 24 | +14 | 34 | |
| Dynamic | 18 | 6 | 2 | 10 | 23 | 36 | -13 | 20 | |
| Kohima Komets | 18 | 5 | 5 | 8 | 20 | 23 | -3 | 20 | |
| Doyang | 18 | 5 | 3 | 10 | 18 | 30 | -12 | 18 | |
| Sangpang | 18 | 4 | 4 | 10 | 15 | 24 | -9 | 16 | |
| Zonipang | 18 | 4 | 4 | 10 | 15 | 41 | -26 | 16 | |
| New Market | 18 | 1 | 1 | 16 | 9 | 62 | -53 | 4 | |

== Top scorers ==
| Rank | Player | Club | Goals |
|---|---|---|---|
| 1 | T. Haokip | Life Sports FC | 25 |
| 2 | David Kuki | Dimapur United | 12 |
| 3 | Amir Lama | Dimapur United | 11 |
| 4 | Asian Kamei | Barak Flamingoz | 11 |
| 5 | Bungthot | Barak Flamingoz | 11 |
