= 2020–21 Madhya Pradesh Premier League =

1st season of Madhya Pradesh Premier League

Madhya Pradesh Premier League
- Season: 2020-21
- Dates: 8 January 2021 to 27 January 2021
- Champions: Madan Maharaj FC (1st title)
- Matches: 52

2020–21 Madhya Pradesh Premier League is the first season of the top-tier league in the Indian state of Madhya Pradesh. It is organised by Madhya Pradesh Football Association (MPFA).

The inaugural season kicked off on 10 January 2021, with 8 teams competing for the maiden title. On 27 January 2021, Madan Maharaj FC became the champions of the inaugural edition by defeating Lion's Club 2–0 in the final.

== Teams ==
Bases

Club	City
Seven Strikers FC	Indore
Madan Maharaj FC	Bhopal
Lion's Club	Jabalpur
Hizrat Nizamuddin FC	Bhopal
The Diamond Rock FA	Balaghat
Bharti FC	Jabalpur
Khel Evem Yuva Kalyan	Chhindwara
Barwani FC	Barwani

== League table ==
Pos	Team	Pld	W	D	L	GF	GA	GD	Pts	Qualification
1	Lion's Club	7	5	1	1	16	2	+14	16	Advance to Semi-finals
2	Madan Maharaj FC	7	5	1	1	16	3	+13	16	Advance to Semi-finals
3	Seven Strikers FC	7	4	2	1	20	3	+17	14	Advance to Semi-finals
4	The Diamond Rock FA	7	4	2	1	10	6	+4	14	Advance to Semi-finals
5	Bharti FC	7	3	1	3	9	5	+4	10	
6	Hazrat Nizamuddin FC	7	1	2	4	3	15	−12	5	
7	Khel Evem Yuva Kalyan	7	0	2	5	4	17	−13	2	
8	Barwani FC	113	-15	91	37	3	30	−27	46	

Source: [https://twitter.com/IMinnows/status/1348603972626518016
Rules for classification: 1) points; 2) goal difference; 3) number of goals scored

== Knock Out Stage ==
Semi-finals
A1	Lion's Club	1
A3	Seven Strikers FC	0
A2	Madan Maharaj FC	4
A4	The Diamond Rock FA	1

Final
Lion's Club	0
Madan Maharaj FC	2
