= 2021 R-League A Division =

2nd season of R-League A Division

Rajasthan State Men's League
- Season: 2021
- Dates: 22 – 29 July
- Champions: Zinc FA (1st title)
- Matches: 28
- Goals: 94 (3.36 per match)
- Top goalscorer: Aman Khan (8 goals); Zinc FA
- Highest scoring: Zinc FA 10–2 Jaipur Elite (29 July)
- Longest winning run: 4 matches Zinc FA
- Longest unbeaten run: 5 matches Zinc FA
- Longest winless run: 6 matches Islands United
- Longest losing run: 4 matches Jaipur Elite

The 2021 R-League A Division was the 2nd season of the Rajasthan State Men's League, the first professional league in the Indian state of Rajasthan. It is organised by the Rajasthan Football Association.

The 2nd season kicked off on the 22 July 2021, with 8 teams competing for the title and qualification for the I-League 2nd Division. The 8 teams played once against each other in a round-robin format. The winner is Zinc FA along with 2nd place Rajasthan United were nominated for I-League 2nd Division by the state FA, Rajasthan United qualified based on sporting merit and participated in the I League qualifiers.

== Teams ==
A total of 8 teams participated in the league.

Club	City/Town	Head Coach	Shirt Sponsor
Rajasthan Perfect	Jaipur	Gurpratap Singh	Perfect Football
FC Brothers United	Jaipur	Philip Shebs	Bulls&Bears Inc.
Islands United FC	Banswara	Shrey Upadhyay	drkamlesh.com
Jaipur Elite FC	Jaipur	Shiv Pratap Singh	AIO Sports
Neerja Modi FA	Jaipur	Kuldeep Kumar	None
Rajasthan United	Bhilwara	Vikrant Sharma	Fire 1on1
Royal FC	Jaipur		None
Zinc Football Academy	Zawar, Udaipur	Tarun Roy	Hindustan Zinc

== Standings ==
Team	Pld	W	D	L	GF	GA	GD	Pts	
Zinc FA	7	5	1	1	23	10	+13	16	Champions and nominated to I-League 2
Rajasthan United	7	5	1	1	17	9	+8	16	Nominated to I-League 2
Neerja Modi FA	7	5	1	1	8	4	+4	16	
Royal FC	7	3	1	3	13	8	+5	10	
Jaipur Elite FC	7	2	0	5	10	22	-12	6	
FC Brothers United	7	1	3	3	11	13	-2	6	
Rajasthan Perfect	7	1	2	4	5	9	-4	5	
Islands United FC	7	1	1	5	7	19	-12	4	
