= Nagaland United SC =

Indian football club

Nagaland United
- Full name: Nagaland United Sports Club
- Nickname: The Bisons
- Short name: NUSC
- Founded: 2024; 2 years ago
- Ground: Chümoukedima Football Stadium
- Capacity: 5,000
- Head coach: Kaizad Ambapardiwalla
- League: Indian Football League; Nagaland Super League (reserves)
- 2026–27: TBA
- Website: www.nagalandunited.com
Home colours	Away colours

Nagaland United Sports Club (NUSC), commonly known as Nagaland United, is an Indian professional football club based in Chümoukedima, Nagaland. Established in 2024, the club competes in the Indian Football League, the second tier of Indian football. The club also competes in the Nagaland Super League, the top state-level football competition in Nagaland, organised by the Nagaland Football Association.

Nagaland United finished third in the inaugural 2025 Nagaland Super League season and won the 25th edition of the NSF Martyrs' Memorial Trophy later that year, defeating Chedema Village Youth Organisation 3–1 in the final. In September 2026, the club acquired Aizawl FC's league sporting rights through an agreement recognised by the All India Football Federation (AIFF), allowing it to participate in the 2026–27 season.

== History ==
=== Foundation and early years (2024–present) ===
Nagaland United Sports Club was established in 2024, ahead of the inaugural Nagaland Super League edition. The Nagaland Super League, and with it Nagaland United's first competitive fixture, was launched on 28 January 2025.

=== 2025 Nagaland Super League ===
In the league phase of the inaugural 2025 season, Nagaland United finished second of seven clubs, recording six wins, three draws and three losses from twelve matches, scoring 22 goals and conceding 9. Results during the season included a 3–0 win over 27 United FC, in which Nisede scored a hat-trick, and a 2–1 victory over Frontier Warriors on match day 11.

The club's second-place finish took it into the playoffs. In the second playoff match on 27 March 2025, Nagaland United was beaten by Barak. They were subsequently eliminated from title contention after a 1–0 defeat to Longterok in the third-place playoff match on 31 March 2025, finishing the debut season in third place overall. Barak FC went on to win the final against Longterok 3–1 to become the league's first champions.

=== 2025 NSF Martyrs' Memorial Trophy ===
In October 2025, Nagaland United Sports Club entered the 25th edition of the NSF Martyrs' Memorial Trophy, an annual club tournament organised by the Angami Students' Union at the Indira Gandhi Stadium in Kohima. The club defeated Mao Students' Union in the quarter-final, before beating Anal Lenruwl Tangpi 4–0 in the semi-final on 16 October 2025, with Sanathoi scoring twice and Jenish and Joel Haokip each adding a goal; Arap Konyak was named player of the match.

In the final on 18 October 2025, Nagaland United defeated Chedema Village Youth Organisation by 3–1 to win the tournament for the first time. Arap Konyak, Joel Haokip and Manton Konyak scored for Nagaland.

=== Indian Football League ===
On September 2026, Nagaland United acquired the Indian Football League sporting rights previously held by Aizawl FC, in an agreement recognised by the All India Football Federation (AIFF). The acquisition enabled the club to enter the 2026–27 Indian Football League, marking its first participation in a national-level league competition.

The club made its debut in the competition on 30 October 2026 against Real Kashmir FC at the TRC Stadium in Srinagar. In the opening match of the 2026–27 season, Nagaland United secured a 3–1 victory over the hosts, recording its first win and earning its first three points in the league. JH Remlala scored the club's first-ever goal in the Indian Football League in the third minute, finishing from close range after a long throw-in by Stephen Lalrinfela.

== Stadium ==
Nagaland United play their home matches at the Chümoukedima Football Stadium in Chümoukedima, which opened in January 2025 with a capacity of approximately 5,000 spectators.

== Players ==
=== First-team squad ===
As of 5 November 2026

Note: Flags indicate national team as defined under FIFA eligibility rules; some limited exceptions apply. Players may hold more than one non-FIFA nationality.

No.	Pos.	Nation	Player
1	GK	IND	Vanlalhriatpuia
4	DF	IND	C Zomuanpuia
5	DF	IND	Rohmingthanga (captain)
6	MF	IND	Vanlalhriatzuala K
7	FW	IND	Laltlanzova
10	FW	IND	Malsawmzuala Tlangte
11	GK	IND	RS Lallawmzuala
12	MF	IND	H Lalruatfela
14	DF	IND	Laldawngzuala
18	FW	IND	Zomuansanga Lalnunzira
20	MF	IND	PC Pazawna

No.	Pos.	Nation	Player
22	DF	IND	RH Laltlanhlua
24	DF	IND	Stephen Lalrinfela
26	FW	IND	Vanlalramnghaka
30	MF	IND	JH Remlala
33	MF	IND	Vanlalawmpuia
37	DF	IND	T Lalmuanawma
41	MF	IND	Eric Remruatpuia Chhangte
42	DF	IND	Laldanmawia Hrangthankima
47	FW	IND	Vincent Lalduhawma
—	GK	NEP	Kiran Chemjong

== Honours ==
- Nagaland Super League
  - Third place (1): 2025
- NSF Martyrs' Memorial Trophy
  - Champions (1): 2025

== See also ==
- Nagaland Football Association
- List of football clubs in India
- Northeast Derby (India)
