= Jayananda Singh =

Indian footballer

Personal information
- Full name: Moirangthem Jayananda Singh
- Date of birth: 1 March 1999 (age 27)
- Place of birth: Imphal, Manipur, India
- Height: 1.80 m (5 ft 11 in)
- Position: Defender

Youth career
- 2015–2016: AIFF Elite Academy
- 2016–2017: DSK Shivajians

Senior career*
Years	Team	Apps	(Gls)
2016–2017	DSK Shivajians	0	(0)
2017	→ Fateh Hyderabad A.F.C. (Loan)	6	(0)
2017	NEROCA F.C.	0	(0)
2017–2019	Delhi Dynamos	1	(0)
2020–	Techtro Swades United FC	1	(1)
- * Club domestic league appearances and goals

Moirangthem Jayananda Singh (born 1 March 1999) is an Indian professional footballer who plays as a left back for the Techtro Swades United FC.

== Career ==
In September 2017, Delhi Dynamos signed Singh ahead of the fourth season of the Indian Super League. A defender who plays as either a full-back or a centre-back, he previously spent time in the youth systems of the AIFF Elite Academy and DSK Shivajians. At the youth international level, Singh captained India at under-14 and under-16 levels and was part of the squad that won the 2013 SAFF U-16 Championship.

On 24 November 2020, Jayananda Singh was officially announced as a signing for Techtro Swades United FC. On his debut, he scored a goal for the club's first ever official game in Himachal Football League.
