= North East Premier League (India) =

Regional professional football league in North East India

- Organising body: North East Football Development Council; Bestserv Inc.
- Founded: 2026
- Country: India
- Region: Northeast India
- Website: neplfootball.com

The North East Premier League (NEPL) is a regional professional football league in Northeast India, officially introduced in January 2026. The league has been conceived as a long-term competition aimed at strengthening football development, sustainability, opportunities for players and stakeholders, and helping state associations move towards financial self-sufficiency, across the eight states.

== History ==
The North East Premier League was formally unveiled on 20 January 2026 at a press conference held in Guwahati. The league was established through a deed of contract signed between the North East Football Development Council (NEFDC), representing the eight state football associations of the region, and Japanese firm Bestserv Inc., under a ten-year agreement.

The first season is set to commence in September 2026.

== Clubs ==
Eight clubs representing the states of Arunachal Pradesh, Assam, Manipur, Meghalaya, Mizoram, Nagaland, Sikkim, and Tripura will be selected through an organised process.

== Format ==
The 2026–27 North East Premier League will consist of a league phase followed by a knockout stage. The competition is expected to follow a franchise-based structure, with matches hosted across multiple regional venues during its first season.

=== League phase ===
Each club will play 14 matches in a double round-robin format, facing other twice (home and away). The top four teams in the standings will advance to the knockout stage.

=== Knockout stage ===
The semi-finals will be played as single-leg matches, with the first-placed facing the fourth-placed and the second-placed facing the third-placed lub. The higher-ranked clubs will host the matches. The final will also be played as a single match at the home ground of the higher-ranked finalist.

== See also ==
- Football in India
- Northeast Derby
- Sikkim Football Association
- Assam Football Association
- Arunachal Pradesh Football Association
- Himachal Pradesh Football Association
- Nagaland Football Association
- All Manipur Football Association
- Mizoram Football Association
- Tripura Football Association
