= Indira Gandhi Stadium (Kohima) =

Football stadium in Kohima, Nagaland

- Interactive map of Indira Gandhi Stadium
- Location: Khikha, Kohima, Nagaland
- Coordinates: 25°42′21″N 94°5′30″E
- Owner: Government of Nagaland
- Operator: Nagaland Football Association
- Capacity: 20,000
- Surface: AstroTurf
- Field size: 104 m × 66 m (341 ft × 217 ft)

Construction
- Groundbreaking: 6 October 1987
- Built: 1987–2003
- Opened: 28 October 2003; 22 years ago
- General contractors: Vilelie Khamo & Sons

Tenants
- Nagaland football team Nagaland Premier League; Nagaland Super League

Indira Gandhi Stadium is a football stadium in Kohima, Nagaland. Opened in 2003, the stadium hosts major regional football matches including the Northeast T. Ao Trophy and the NSF Martyrs Trophy. With 20,000 seats, it is the largest stadium in Nagaland.

== History ==
The stadium is named after Indira Gandhi, the third Prime Minister of India and the country's only female premier. The foundation stone of the stadium was laid by her son Rajiv Gandhi on 6 October 1987, and it was inaugurated on 28 October 2003 by the then Prime Minister of India Atal Bihari Vajpayee. The stadium was built by Nagaland firm Vilelie Khamo & Sons.
