= Mali Khedi =

- village
- Location within Madhya Pradesh Location within India
- Coordinates: 23.197644°N 77.304835°E
- Country: India
- State: Madhya Pradesh
- District: Bhopal
- Tehsil: Huzur

Population (2011)
  - Total: 710
- Time zone: UTC+5:30 (IST)
- ISO 3166 code: MP-IN
- Census code: 482512

Mali Khedi is a village in the Bhopal district of Madhya Pradesh, India. It is located in the Huzur tehsil and the Phanda block. The Jagran Lakecity University is located near the village.

== Demographics ==
According to the 2011 census of India, Mali Khedi has 148 households. The effective literacy rate (i.e. the literacy rate of population excluding children aged 6 and below) is 61.33%.

Demographics (2011 Census)
	Total	Male	Female
Population	710	375	335
Children aged below 6 years	110	53	57
Scheduled caste	52	26	26
Scheduled tribe	110	54	56
Literates	368	214	154
Workers (all)	269	204	65
Main workers (total)	262	198	64
Main workers: Cultivators	79	71	8
Main workers: Agricultural labourers	60	48	12
Main workers: Household industry workers	1	1	0
Main workers: Other	122	78	44
Marginal workers (total)	7	6	1
Marginal workers: Cultivators	2	1	1
Marginal workers: Agricultural labourers	3	3	0
Marginal workers: Household industry workers	0	0	0
Marginal workers: Others	2	2	0
Non-workers	441	171	270
