= 2020–21 Indian Women's League =

Indian Women's League
- Season: 2020–21
- Dates: Cancelled

The 2020–21 Indian Women's League was to be the fifth season of the Indian Women's League, the top division women's professional football league in India. The final round was scheduled to start from 21 April 2021 in Odisha but was later postponed due 2nd wave of COVID-19 pandemic in India.

The AFC (Asian Football Confederation) announced that the winners of the 2020-21 IWL will get to feature in the 2021 edition of AFC Women's Club Championship, the premier women's club tournament of Asia.

== Teams ==
Leagues organized by the state federations acted as preliminary qualifiers.

2020–21 Indian Women's League (India)

| Team | City | State |
|---|---|---|
| Gokulam Kerala | Kozhikode | Kerala |
| Mata Rukmani (Girls) | Dimrapara, Bastar district | Chhattisgarh |
| Barwani FC | Barwani | Madhya Pradesh |
| Shirsh Bihar United | Patna | Bihar |
| Techtro Swades United | Una | Himachal Pradesh |
| Travancore Royals | Thiruvananthapuram | Kerala |
| BBK DAV FT | Amritsar | Punjab |
| Sethu FC | Madurai | Tamil Nadu |
| MMF Club | | |

== Qualifying playoffs ==
=== Group A ===
| Pos | Team | Pld | W | D | L | GF | GA | GD | Pts | Qualification |
|---|---|---|---|---|---|---|---|---|---|---|
| 1 | MMF Club | 0 | 0 | 0 | 0 | 0 | 0 | 0 | 0 | Qualification to Round 2 |
| 2 | Shirsh Bihar United | 0 | 0 | 0 | 0 | 0 | 0 | 0 | 0 | |
| 3 | Travancore Royals | 0 | 0 | 0 | 0 | 0 | 0 | 0 | 0 | |

Source: Voice of Indian Football

==== Schedule ====
7 April 2021
08:30

| Travancore Royals | Postponed | MMF Club |
|---|---|---|
| | Report |

Jawaharlal Nehru Stadium, New Delhi
9 April 2021
16:00

| MMF Club | Postponed | Shirsh Bihar United |
|---|---|---|
| | Report |

Jawaharlal Nehru Stadium, New Delhi
11 April 2021
16:00

| Shirsh Bihar United | Postponed | Travancore Royals |
|---|---|---|
| | Report |

Jawaharlal Nehru Stadium, New Delhi

=== Group B ===
| Pos | Team | Pld | W | D | L | GF | GA | GD | Pts | Qualification |
|---|---|---|---|---|---|---|---|---|---|---|
| 1 | Bhadwani FC | 0 | 0 | 0 | 0 | 0 | 0 | 0 | 0 | Qualification to Round 2 |
| 2 | Sethu | 0 | 0 | 0 | 0 | 0 | 0 | 0 | 0 | |
| 3 | Techtro Swades United | 0 | 0 | 0 | 0 | 0 | 0 | 0 | 0 | |

Source: Voice of Indian Football

==== Schedule ====
7 April 2021
16:00

| Sethu | Postponed | Techtro Swades United |
|---|---|---|
| | Report |

Jawaharlal Nehru Stadium, New Delhi
9 April 2021
08:30

| Techtro Swades United | Postponed | Bhadwani |
|---|---|---|
| | Report |

Jawaharlal Nehru Stadium, New Delhi
11 April 2021
08:30

| Bhadwani | Postponed | Sethu |
|---|---|---|
| | Report |

Jawaharlal Nehru Stadium, New Delhi

=== Group C ===
| Pos | Team | Pld | W | D | L | GF | GA | GD | Pts | Qualification |
|---|---|---|---|---|---|---|---|---|---|---|
| 1 | BBK DAV | 0 | 0 | 0 | 0 | 0 | 0 | 0 | 0 | Qualification to Round 2 |
| 2 | Gokulam Kerala | 0 | 0 | 0 | 0 | 0 | 0 | 0 | 0 | |
| 3 | Mata Rukmani | 0 | 0 | 0 | 0 | 0 | 0 | 0 | 0 | |

Source: AIFF

==== Schedule ====
8 April 2021
16:00

| BBK DAV | Postponed | Mata Rukmani |
|---|---|---|
| | Report |

Jawaharlal Nehru Stadium, New Delhi
10 April 2021
08:30

| BBK DAV | Postponed | Gokulam Kerala |
|---|---|---|
| | Report |

Jawaharlal Nehru Stadium, New Delhi
12 April 2021
08:30

| Gokulam Kerala | Postponed | Mata Rukmani |
|---|---|---|
| | Report |

Jawaharlal Nehru Stadium, New Delhi

=== Round 2 ===
14 April 2021
08:00

| Winner 1 | Postponed | Winner 4 |
|---|---|---|
| | Report |

Jawaharlal Nehru Stadium, New Delhi
14 April 2021
16:00

| Winner 2 | Postponed | Winner 3 |
|---|---|---|
| | Report |

Jawaharlal Nehru Stadium, New Delhi
