= Techtro Swades United Women's FC =

Indian professional association football club

- Full name: Techtro Swades United Women's Football Club
- Nickname: The Lioness
- Short name: TSUWFC
- Founded: August 29, 2020; 5 years ago
- Ground: Khad Football Ground, Una, Himachal Pradesh
- Chairman: Neeraj Kholiya
- League: Himachal Women's League
- 2020–21: Champions
- Website: www.techtrofootball.com

Departments of Techtro Swades United FC
- Football (Women's): Football (Men's)

Techtro Swades United Women's Football Club is an Indian women's football department of Techtro Swades United. The team is based in Una, Himachal Pradesh. It competes in the Himachal Women's League.

The club was established in March 2021. In the same month, they were crowned as the champions of inaugural edition of Himachal Women's League and advanced to Indian Women's League.

== Competitive record ==
Competition	Season	Position
Himachal Women's League	2020–21	1st
Indian Women's League	2020–21	Did not participate
Indian Women's League	2021–22	Not held
Indian Women's League	2022–23	TBD

== Honours ==
- Himachal Women's League
  - Champions (1): 2020–21
