= 2024–25 R-League A Division =

5th season of R-League A Division

Rajasthan State Men's League
- Season: 2024–25
- Dates: 7 April, 2025 – 31 May, 2025
- Champions: Zinc Football
- Matches: 110
- Goals: 487 (4.43 per match)
- Biggest home win: Jaipur Elite 38-0 Rising Rajasthan FC (15 May 2025)
- Biggest away win: Rising Rajasthan FC 0-11 Sunrise FC (5 May 2025)
- Highest scoring: Jaipur Elite 38-0 Rising Rajasthan FC (15 May 2025)
- Longest winning run: 12 matches Zinc Football
- Longest unbeaten run: 14 matches Brothers United
- Longest winless run: 12 matches Rising Rajasthan FC
- Longest losing run: 12 matches Rising Rajasthan FC

The 2024–25 R-League A Division is the 5th season of the Rajasthan State Men's League, the first professional league in the Indian state of Rajasthan. It is organised by the Rajasthan Football Association.

== Teams ==
Locations of the R-League A Division teams

A total of 11 teams participated in the league.

Club	City/Town	Stadium
ASL FC	Jaipur	Chougan Stadium
Brothers United	Jaipur	Jiem
City Wolves	Jaipur	Jaipur Elite Football Ground
Jaipur Elite	Jaipur	Jethri FC Stadium
Jethri FC	Sikar	Jethri FC Stadium
Real Jaipur FC	Jaipur	Royal FC Stadium
Rising Jaipur FC	Jaipur	Jethri FC Stadium
Rising Rajasthan FC	Jaipur	Jiem
Royal FC Jaipur	Jaipur	Royal FC Stadium
Sunrise FC	Sirohi	Royal FC Stadium
Zinc Football	Udaipur	Zawar Stadium

== League table ==
Pos	Team	Pld	W	D	L	GF	GA	GD	Pts	Qualification
1	Zinc Football	20	16	2	2	70	6	+64	50	Champions and Eligible for 2025–26 I-League 3
2	Royal FC Jaipur	20	15	2	3	54	14	+40	47	
3	Brothers United	20	15	2	3	48	11	+37	47	
4	Jaipur Elite	20	13	1	6	101	20	+81	40	
5	ASL FC	20	10	0	10	36	34	+2	30	
6	Sunrise FC	20	9	1	10	54	35	+19	28	
7	Jethri FC	20	8	3	9	42	33	+9	27	
8	Rising Jaipur FC	20	4	3	13	22	92	−70	15	
9	Real Jaipur FC	20	4	2	14	33	48	−15	14	
10	City Wolves	20	4	1	15	15	61	−46	13	
11	Rising Rajasthan FC	20	3	1	16	12	133	−121	10	

Updated to match(es) played on 31 May 2025. Source: The Away End
Archived

== Fixtures and results ==
Home \ Away	ASL	BRO	CIW	JEL	JFC	REJ	RIJ	RIR	RFC	SFC	ZFA
ASL FC	—	0–3	3–1	0–2	2–4	4–0	3–0	3–0	0–3	4–2	1–5
Brothers United	3–0	—	3–0	2–0	0–0	3–0	4–1	2–0	2–3	1–0	0–0
City Wolves	0–3 (Note: Matches were forfeited by City Wolves.)	0–3	—	0–5	1–4	0–3	2–2	0–3	0–3	0–3	0–3
Jaipur Elite	4–1	2–0	9–0	—	2–1	5–1	12–1	38–0	0–3	1–3	1–2
Jethri FC	2–1	0–2	3–0	3–0	—	2–2	9–0	9–0	0–1	3–3	0–5
Real Jaipur FC	0–1	0–2	1–2	0–4	0–1	—	10–0	3–0	1–2	0–1	0–3
Rising Jaipur FC	0–6	0–3	3–5	1–5	1–0	2–2	—	5–2	0–6	2–5	0–6
Rising Rajasthan FC	2–1	1–10	0–1	0–9	2–1	0–8	2–2	—	0–3	0–11	0–4
Royal FC Jaipur	1–2	1–4	4–1	0–0	3–0	3–1	0–1	4–0	—	1–0	2–2
Sunrise FC	2–0	0–1	0–2	1–2	2–0	5–1	0–1	16–0	0–10	—	0–2
Zinc Football	0–1	3–0	3–0	1–0	6–0	8–0	10–0	3–0 (Note: Match was forfeited by Rising Rajasthan.)	0–1	4–0	—

Updated to match(es) played on 31 May 2025. Source: The Away End
RFA Facebook
Legend: Blue = home team win; Yellow = draw; Red = away team win.

=== Results by games ===
Team ╲ Round	1	2	3	4	5	6	7	8	9	10	11	12	13	14	15	16	17	18	19	20
ASL FC	L	L	L	L	L	W	W	L	L	W	L	W	W	L	L	W	L	W	W	W
Brothers United	W	D	W	W	W	W	W	W	D	W	W	W	W	W	L	W	W	L	W	L
City Wolves	L	W	W	L	L	W	D	L	W	L	L	L	L	L	L	L	L	L	L	L
Jaipur Elite	W	W	W	W	W	W	L	L	D	W	W	L	L	W	W	W	L	W	L	W
Jethri FC	L	L	L	L	D	W	W	W	L	L	W	D	W	W	L	W	L	W	D	L
Real Jaipur FC	L	L	W	L	L	L	L	L	W	L	L	D	L	L	L	L	L	W	W	D
Rising Jaipur FC	W	L	W	D	L	W	L	D	L	L	L	L	L	D	W	L	L	L	L	L
Rising Rajasthan FC	L	L	W	L	L	D	W	L	L	L	L	L	L	L	L	L	L	L	L	W
Royal FC Jaipur	W	W	W	D	L	W	L	W	W	D	L	W	W	W	W	W	W	W	W	W
Sunrise FC	L	L	L	L	L	W	L	W	W	W	L	W	L	W	D	L	W	W	W	L
Zinc Football	W	D	D	L	W	W	W	W	W	W	W	W	W	W	W	W	W	L	W	W

Updated to match(es) played on 31 May 2024. Source: The Away End
W = Win; D = Draw; L = Lose
