= Nagaland Premier League =

Indian regional association football league in the state of Nagaland

- Founded: 2011; 15 years ago
- Country: India
- Number of clubs: 10
- Level on pyramid: 5
- Domestic cup: Dr. T. Ao Trophy

The Nagaland Premier League was the top state-level football league in the Indian state of Nagaland. It was managed by Nagaland Football Association (NFA). In 2024 it was announced that a new competition, Nagaland Super League, would be launched as the state's top tier football competition.

== Structure ==
It featured the best 10 clubs of Nagaland competing for the trophy. Each club played other twice (home and away).

The winning club would be nominated for the I-League 2nd Division. Since the league has become inactive, some clubs found initial solution in joining events of nearby Manipur or Mizoram Football Association.

== Clubs ==
This is the completed club list for the 2013 season.

| Club | District |
|---|---|
| Dimapur United | Dimapur |
| Doyang | Wokha |
| Dynamic | Dimapur |
| Flamingoz | Peren |
| Kohima Komets | Kohima |
| Life Sports | Kohima |
| Naga Tornados | Zunheboto |
| New Market | Kohima |
| Sangpang | Mokokchung |
| Zonipang | Mokokchung |

== Winners ==
List of Nagaland Premier League winners
| Season | Champions |
|---|---|
| 2012 | Barak Flamingoz |
| 2013 | Veda F.C. |
