= Jiten Murmu =

Indian professional football player

Personal information
- Full name: Jiten Murmu
- Date of birth: 31 July 1994 (age 32)
- Place of birth: Bankura, West Bengal
- Position: Forward

Team information
- Current team: Bhawanipore
- Number: 17

Youth career
- 2013–2015: East Bengal

Senior career*
Years	Team	Apps	(Gls)
2015–2017	East Bengal	14	(4)
2017–2018	Mohammedan Sporting	4	(1)
2018	Mohun Bagan		
2018–2019	Peerless		
2019–2020	→ Mohammedan (loan)	6	(1)
2020	Bhawanipore	4	(1)
2020–2021	Roundglass Punjab		
2021	Madan Maharaj	6	(2)
2022–	Bhawanipore		
- * Club domestic league appearances and goals

Jiten Murmu is an Indian professional footballer who plays as a forward for Bhawanipore in the Calcutta Football League.

== Career ==
Born in West Bengal, Jiten began his career with the East Bengal FC Reserves and Academy and got promoted to the senior team in 2015. He debuted for Roundglass Punjab on 9 January 2021 in the I-League against Aizawl.
