= Kohima Komets =

Indian association football club

- Full name: Kohima Komets Football Club
- Nickname(s): The Komets
- Founded: 2011; 14 years ago
- Ground: Local Ground, Kohima
- Capacity: 20,000
- League: Nagaland Premier League
Home colours	Away colours

Kohima Komets FC (known simply as KKFC) is an Indian professional football club based in Kohima, Nagaland. The club was established in 2011. It has participated in the I-League 2nd Division (3rd tier of national league pyramid), and currently in the Nagaland Premier League.

== History ==
The Kohima Komets Football Club (KKFC) was established in the year of 2011. The club has participated in I-League 2nd Division held in 2018–19 & the Nagaland Premier League. The Kohima Komets play at the 20,000-capacity Local Ground in Kohima, which is used mostly for football matches.

== Kit manufacturers and shirt sponsors ==
Period	Kit manufacturer	Shirt sponsor
2013–14	Nivia	None
2018—present	Nivia	Aircel

== Players ==
=== First team squad ===
Note: Flags indicate national team as defined under FIFA eligibility rules; some limited exceptions apply. Players may hold more than one non-FIFA nationality.

No.	Pos.	Nation	Player
—	GK	(India) IND	Kenneth Malswamthang
—	GK	(India) IND	Peisuidibe Solo
—	GK	(India) IND	Alemse Sangtam
—	DF	(India) IND	Thangliankup Vaiphei
—	DF	(India) IND	Meino Singh
—	DF	(India) IND	Dominic Kirha
—	DF	(India) IND	Daniel Hmar
—	DF	(India) IND	Thakhellambam Kornan
—	DF	(India) IND	Emmanuel Lungtau
—	DF	(India) IND	Stephen Rutsa
—	DF	(India) IND	Alishe Asuman
—	MF	(India) IND	Surchand Singh
—	MF	(India) IND	Bikram Singh

No.	Pos.	Nation	Player
—	MF	(India) IND	Tingngyek Konyak
—	MF	(India) IND	Velukho Rhakho
—	MF	(India) IND	Ishmael Shaiza
—	MF	(India) IND	Khwetelhi Thopi
—	MF	(India) IND	Johny Khamrang
—	MF	(India) IND	Christopher Kamei
—	MF	(India) IND	Imnaakhum Longkümer
—	MF	(India) IND	Yambem Jetlee Singh
—	FW	(India) IND	K.Abu
—	FW	(India) IND	Kezhose Khizho
—	FW	(India) IND	Premkumar
—	FW	(India) IND	Ninleithing

=== Head coaching record ===
updated on 28 May 2017

Name	Nationality	From	To	P	W	D	L	GF	GA	Win%
Alfredo Ramirez	Mexico	2013	2014	8	1	1	6	4	25	12.50
Paulo Menezes	Portugal	2018	2020							
