= Rajasthan Perfect FC =

Indian association football club

Rajasthan Perfect
- Full name: Rajasthan Perfect Football Club
- Nickname: RPFC
- Founded: 2018; 8 years ago (as AU Rajasthan FC)
- Ground: Maharaja Umaid Singh Stadium
- Capacity: 20,000
- Owner: Spordy Ventures Private Limited
- Head coach: Mangesh Desai
- League: R-League A Division
Home colours	Away colours

Rajasthan Perfect Football Club (formerly as AU Rajasthan Football Club), is an Indian professional football club based in Jaipur, Rajasthan, that competes in the R-League A Division, and previously participated in the I-League 2nd Division. Founded in 2018, the club first competed professionally when they were part of the 2019–20 season of I-League 2nd Division, the second tier of Indian football league system.

== History ==
AU Rajasthan FC is the first premier professional football club and academy based out of Jaipur. The club was founded in the year of 2018 and comes under the banner of Spordy Ventures Private Limited. In its first year of inception, the club has managed to qualify for the Hero Youth leagues and also win the first-ever Rajasthan Women's League. The club aims to provide a pathway of progressive growth from the grassroots level to competing at the highest professional level.

The club is in collaboration with Palamós CF, one of the oldest clubs in Spain, founded in 1898, and its academy Perfect Football is the technical partner of AU Rajasthan FC. The club plans to train players with use of global training methodology in partnership with Perfect Football. AU Rajasthan is the first club from Rajasthan to play in I-League 2nd Division. Rajasthan FC organised Christmas Cup 2020 in Purnima University and Heritage Cup in February 2021, which was won by ARA FC.

AU Rajasthan participated in the inaugural Rajasthan State Men's League 2019 and finished as runners-up with 15 points from 7 matches, behind champion Rajasthan United.

AU Rajasthan FC has launched a premier football residential academy in Jaipur, in collaboration with Poornima University. The club handpicked players from all the major cities of India through trials.

Rajasthan FC rebranded themselves as Rajasthan Perfect FC ahead of R-League A Division 2021.

== Stadiums ==
AU Rajasthan used the Maharaja Umaid Singh Stadium in Jodhpur as their home stadium for I-League 2nd Division of 2019–20 season matches. They played at the University Sports Complex during the inaugural season of R-League A Division.

== Kit manufacturers and shirt sponsors ==
Period	Kit manufacturer	Shirt sponsor
2019—2020	AIO Sports	AU Small Finance Bank
2021—present	AIO Sports	Perfect Football

== Personnel ==
Current technical staff (as of 20 January 2020)
Position	Name
Team manager	(India) Mangesh Shreekant Desai
Technical director	(India) Gurpratap Singh
Head coach	(India) Praveen Kumar
Assistant coach	(India) Nitish Dimri
Physio	(India) Mohammed Shahid

== Players ==
=== 2022 squad ===
As of 5 April 2022

Note: Flags indicate national team as defined under FIFA eligibility rules; some limited exceptions apply. Players may hold more than one non-FIFA nationality.

No.	Pos.	Nation	Player
1	GK	IND	Nitin Meel
2	DF	IND	Abhyuday Motwani
3	DF	IND	Tushar Negi
4	DF	IND	Aravind Sharma
5	DF	IND	Spandan Sharma
6	MF	IND	Pranendra Singh Thakur
7	MF	IND	Kamran Panwar
8	MF	IND	Shiv Pratap Singh Ranawat
9	FW	IND	Ishaan Sahi
10	MF	IND	Bhupendru Singh Meena
11	MF	IND	Utkrsh Koushik
15	DF	IND	Shorayav Bhardwaj
17	DF	IND	Prashant Narayan Choudhary

No.	Pos.	Nation	Player
18	DF	IND	Robot Atkan
19	MF	IND	Ashen Henna Metel
20	MF	IND	Martand Raina
21	MF	IND	DM Rakeveiche
22	DF	IND	Prateek Choudhary
23	MF	IND	Mumtaz Akhtar
24	MF	IND	Deepak Sai Thukral
25	FW	BRA	Eliel da Cruz Guardiano
26	DF	IND	Prithu Sharma
27	MF	IND	Rudra Pratap Singh Bist
45	FW	IND	Rahul Sharma
46	FW	BRA	Pedro Augusto Araujo Pinheiro
99	GK	IND	Maninder Singh

== Team record ==
Season	Div.	Tms.	Pos.	Attendance/G	Federation Cup/Super Cup	AFC Champions League	AFC Cup
2019–20	IL2	18	Group stage	–	DNP	DNP	DNP

Key

- Tms. = Number of teams
- Pos. = Position in league
- Attendance/G = Average league attendance

=== Head coaching record ===
updated on 20 July 2020

Name	Nationality	From	To	P	W	D	L	GF	GA	Win%
Mangesh Shreekant Desai	India	2020		6	1	2	3	4	7	16.67

== Affiliated clubs ==
The following clubs are currently affiliated with AU Rajasthan FC:

- (Spain) Palamós CF (2018–present)
