= Madan Maharaj FC =

Indian professional association football club

Madan Maharaj
- Full name: Madan Maharaj Football Club
- Short name: MMFC
- Founded: 1992; 34 years ago
- Ground: TT Nagar Stadium
- Capacity: 20,000
- Head coach: Amit Kumar Jaiswal
- League: Madhya Pradesh Premier League
Home colours	Away colours	Third colours

Madan Maharaj Football Club is an Indian professional football club based in Bhopal, Madhya Pradesh. It is also first professional football club from the state. They currently compete in Madhya Pradesh Premier League and were part of 2021 I-League Qualifiers.

== History ==
=== Formation and journey ===
The club was founded in 1992. They participated in the 24th Bodofa Upen Brahma All India Gold Cup football tournament and reached the semi-finals.

=== Present years ===
In 2018, Madan Maharaj FC was nominated by the Madhya Pradesh Football Association, but couldn't participate in the I-League 2. Madan Maharaj became champions of Madhya Pradesh Premier League inaugural season in 2021, by defeating Lions Club FC of Jabalpur in the final match, by a margin of 2–0. They scored first goal in 34th minute and increased the lead in 88th minute. In July, the club was nominated for 2021–22 I-League 2nd division or 2021 I-League Qualifiers, by Madhya Pradesh Football Association. In August, teams for the qualifiers were announced, and the club secured a spot.

== Stadium ==
Madam Maharaj played their MP Premier League matches at Barkatullah Khan University's ground in Bhopal. They also play some home matches at Tatya Tope Nagar Sports Complex.

== Players (2022) ==
Note: Flags indicate national team as defined under FIFA eligibility rules; some limited exceptions apply. Players may hold more than one non-FIFA nationality.

No.	Pos.	Nation	Player
—	GK	IND	Sayan Roy
—	GK	IND	Calvin Abhishek
—	GK	IND	Kaushik Das
—	GK	IND	Sumit Haldar
—	DF	IND	Achal Raj Mishra
—	DF	IND	Abhishek Das
—	DF	IND	Vivek Kumar
—	DF	NGR	Loveday Enyinnaya
—	DF	IND	Shorayav Bharadwaj
—	DF	IND	Sourav Das
—	MF	IND	N Mikel Singh
—	MF	IND	Harsh Safique
—	MF	IND	Dolendra Singh
—	MF	IND	Ganesh Beshra
—	MF	IND	Bishnu Bordoloi
—	MF	IND	Hitendra Singh Thakur

No.	Pos.	Nation	Player
—	MF	IND	Mehtab Hossain
—	MF	IND	Siam Hanghal
—	MF	IND	Abhinas Ruidas
—	MF	IND	Omahang Limboo
—	MF	IND	Longjam Swami
—	MF	IND	Hirak Mondal
—	MF	IND	C.Rabi Kumar
—	MF	IND	Mehtab Mehtab
—	MF	IND	Samson Singh
—	MF	IND	Rupesh Kaushal
—	FW	IND	Manvendra singh Sisodiya
—	FW	IND	Akash solanki(Akashsolankioffical)
—	FW	IND	Jiten Murmu
—	FW	RSA	William Twala

== Personnel ==
As of 27 July 2021

Position	Name
Head coach	(India) Amit Kumar Jaiswal
Team director	(India) Subrata Jha
Physiotherapist	(India) Sayed Anvar

== Honours ==
=== League ===
- I-League 2nd Division
  - Fourth place (1): 2021
- Madhya Pradesh Premier League
  - Champions (1): 2021

=== Cup ===
- State Gold Cup (Madhya Pradesh)
  - Champions (1): 2018

== Youth section ==
Madan Maharaj has its youth men's football team, while club's U17 team took part in the group stages of 2022–23 U-17 Youth Cup.

== See also ==
- Lakecity FC
