= Nagaland Super League =

Indian regional association football league in the state of Nagaland

- Organising body: Nagaland Football Association
- Founded: 2024; 2 years ago
- Country: India
- Number of clubs: 7
- Level on pyramid: 5
- Promotion to: I-League 3 (proposed)
- Current champions: Barak FC (1st title) (2025)
- Broadcasters: NSL; Northeast Live; SportsCast India (YouTube)
- Website: nagalandsuperleague.com
- Current: 2025 Nagaland Super League

The Nagaland Super League is a men's professional franchise football league in the state of Nagaland, India, organised by the Nagaland Football Association (NFA).

== History ==
The Nagaland Super League (NSL) was founded in 2024 by the Nagaland Football Association (NFA) to enhance the standard of football in the state and provide a competitive platform for local talent. The inaugural season of the league began in 2025, with the goal of fostering football development, scouting young players, and promoting the sport across Nagaland. The NSL features teams from various districts, creating a high level of competition while contributing to the overall growth of football in the region. The league is seen as a key initiative to elevate Nagaland's football scene and to create opportunities for players to progress to higher levels of the sport.

== Clubs ==
Locations of the NSL clubs

Club	City
27 United	Kohima
Barak	Peren
Frontier Warriors	Tuensang
Longterok	Mokokchung
Nagaland United	Chümoukedima
Red Scars	Dimapur
Sechü Zubza	Sechü Zubza

== Format ==
In the inaugural season, 7 teams took part. They played with each other a league stage consisting of a double round-robin with each team playing total 12 matches. Top 4 teams qualified for playoffs where page playoff system was maintained.

== Stadiums ==
The stadiums for the 2025 edition.

Nagaland United	Barak	Longterok	Red Scars	27 United	Frontier Warriors	Sechü Zubza
Chümoukedima Football Stadium				Indira Gandhi Stadium		
Capacity: 5,000				Capacity: 20,000		

== Results ==
Season	Champions	Runners-up	No. of teams
2025	Barak	Longterok	7

== Marketing ==
Sponsors
IDAN; NOA; DoYRS; GoN; AIFF; NFA	Coca-Cola; Kingfisher; Madame; Nivia; MIP; SuchirIndia	SportsCast India; Toyota; Royal Enfield; Nagaland Post; Kaki; Ahibi
