= Himachal Pradesh Football Association =

State governing body of Football in Himachal Pradesh

- Sport: Football
- Jurisdiction: Himachal Pradesh
- Membership: 12 district associations
- Abbreviation: HPFA
- Affiliation: All India Football Federation (AIFF)
- Headquarters: Una
- President: Sunil Sharma
- Secretary: Deepak Sharma

The Himachal Pradesh Football Association (abbreviated HPFA) is one of the 36 Indian state football associations that are affiliated to the All India Football Federation.

== History ==
The Himachal Pradesh Football Association was founded in 1971 with the objective of fostering the growth of football in the state. Over the years, it has become a vital institution in the sporting landscape, contributing significantly to the advancement of the sport at both the amateur and professional levels.

== State teams ==
=== Men ===
- Himachal Pradesh football team
- Himachal Pradesh under-20 football team
- Himachal Pradesh under-15 football team
- Himachal Pradesh under-13 football team

=== Women ===
- Himachal Pradesh women's football team
- Himachal Pradesh women's under-19 football team
- Himachal Pradesh women's under-17 football team

== Affiliated district associations ==
All 12 districts of Himachal Pradesh are affiliated with the Himachal Pradesh Football Association.

No.	Association	District	President
1	Bilaspur District Football Association	Bilaspur	
2	Chamba District Football Association	Chamba	
3	Hamirpur District Football Association	Hamirpur	
4	Kangra District Football Association	Kangra	
5	Kinnaur District Football Association	Kinnaur	
6	Kullu District Football Association	Kullu	
7	Lahaul and Spiti District Football Association	Lahaul and Spiti	
8	Mandi District Football Association	Mandi	
9	Shimla District Football Association	Shimla	
10	Sirmaur District Football Association	Sirmaur	
11	Solan District Football Association	Solan	
12	Una District Football Association	Una	

== Competitions ==
=== Club level ===
==== Men's Senior ====
- Himachal Football League

==== Women's Senior ====
- Himachal Women's League

== See also ==
- List of Indian state football associations
- Football in India
- North East Premier League (India)
