= Nagaland Football Association =

Association football governing body in Nagaland

- Sport: Football
- Jurisdiction: Nagaland
- Membership: 16 district associations
- Abbreviation: NFA
- Affiliation: All India Football Federation (AIFF)
- Headquarters: Kohima
- President: Neibou Sekhose
- Secretary: Benel M. Lamthiu

The Nagaland Football Association (NFA) is one of the 36 Indian state football associations that are affiliated with the All India Football Federation. It is the state-level governing body of football in Nagaland, India. The Nagaland football team is also administered by NFA. Nagaland Football Association manages Nagaland Super League, the state football competition in Nagaland. It also sends state teams for Santosh Trophy and Rajmata Jijabai Trophy.

== State teams ==
=== Men ===
- Nagaland football team
- Nagaland under-20 football team
- Nagaland under-15 football team
- Nagaland under-13 football team

=== Women ===
- Nagaland women's football team
- Nagaland women's under-19 football team
- Nagaland women's under-17 football team

== Affiliated district associations ==
All 16 district of Nagaland are affiliated with the Nagaland Football Association.

No.	Association	District	President
1	Chümoukedima District Football Association	Chümoukedima	
2	Dimapur District Football Association	Dimapur	
3	Kiphire District Football Association	Kiphire	
4	Kohima District Football Association	Kohima	
5	Longleng District Football Association	Longleng	
6	Mokokchung District Football Association	Mokokchung	
7	Mon District Football Association	Mon	
8	Niuland District Football Association	Niuland	
9	Noklak District Football Association	Noklak	
10	Peren District Football Association	Peren	
11	Football Association Phek District	Phek	
12	Shamator District Football Association	Shamator	
13	Tseminyü District Football Association	Tseminyü	
14	Tuensang District Football Association	Tuensang	
15	Wokha District Football Association	Wokha	
16	Zünheboto District Football Association	Zünheboto	

== Competitions ==
=== Men's ===
- Nagaland Premier League
- Nagaland Super League (franchise)
- Dr. T. Ao Inter District Football Championship
- Nagaland Futsal Club Championship

=== Women's ===
- Nagaland Open Women Football League

== See also ==
- Football in India
- North East Premier League (India)
