= Madhya Pradesh Premier League =

- Organising body: Madhya Pradesh Football Association (MPFA)
- Founded: 2020; 6 years ago
- Country: India
- Number of clubs: 9
- Level on pyramid: 5
- Promotion to: I-League 3
- Current champions: Lakecity (4th title) (2025–26)
- Most championships: Lakecity (4 titles)
- Broadcaster(s): SportsCast India (YouTube)
- Current: 2025–26

The Madhya Pradesh Premier League is the top-tier state club league in the Indian state of Madhya Pradesh. It is organised by Madhya Pradesh Football Association (MPFA). The winner is awarded the SR Deb Trophy.

The inaugural season kicked off on 10 January 2021, with 8 teams competing for the maiden title. On 27 January 2021, Madan Maharaj FC became the champions of the inaugural edition by defeating Lion's Club 2–0 in the final.

== Format and regulations ==
A total of 9 teams are competing in the league. Each team can sign any number of players outside of Madhya Pradesh, however at least 5 in the playing 11 must be from the district the club belongs. Each team plays home and away round robin format, and top two play the final to decide the winner.

== Teams ==
| Club | City/Town | Seasons participated | Titles Won |
|---|---|---|---|
| Lakecity | Bhopal | 2 | 2 |
| Madan Maharaj | Bhopal | 3 | 1 |
| Barwani FC | Barwani | 4 | |
| Barhampur FC | Barhampur | 4 | |
| Indore Warriors | Indore | 2 | |
| Khel Evam Yuva Kalyan FC | Chhindwara | 2 | |
| Lions Club | Jabalpur | 3 | |
| YSDA | Mhow | 2 | |
| Diamond Rock FA | Ratlam | 4 | |

== Winners ==
| Edition | Years | Winning Club | Winner based in | No. of Clubs |
|---|---|---|---|---|
| 1st | 2020–21 | Madan Maharaj | Bhopal | 8 |
| 2nd | 2021–22 | Eagles FC | Neemuch | 12 |
| 3rd | 2022–23 | Lakecity | Bhopal | |
| 4th | 2023–24 | Lakecity | Bhopal | |
| 5th | 2024–25 | Lakecity | Bhopal | |
| 6th | 2025–26 | Lakecity | Bhopal | 8 |

== Media coverage ==
| Period | TV/Streaming channel |
|---|---|
| 2021– | Sportscast India |
