= Rajasthan State Men's League =

Football league in Rajasthan, Cambodia

- Organising body: Rajasthan Football Association
- Founded: 2019; 7 years ago
- Country: India
- Divisions: 2 (A & B Division)
- Number of clubs: 8
- Level on pyramid: 5 & 6
- Promotion to: I-League 3
- Current champions: Zinc FA (3rd title) (2025–26)
- Most championships: Zinc FA (3 titles)
- Broadcaster(s): SportsCast India (YouTube)
- Current: 2025–26

The Rajasthan State Men's League, also known as R-League A Division, is the top state-level football league in the Indian state of Rajasthan, conducted by Rajasthan Football Association. Inaugural season with 8 participating teams, and concluded on 6 October 2019. Rajasthan United became the first champion. All matches were played on a single venue, Rajasthan University Sports Complex.

== League structure ==
Tier	Division
1 _{(5 on Indian football Pyramid)}	R-League A Division
2 _{(6 on Indian football pyramid)}	R-League B Division

== History ==
The first Rajasthan State Men's League started with 8 teams in 2019. Jaipur based JECRC CF won the title.

== Clubs ==
A total of 7 teams participated in the league for the 2025–26 edition.

Club	City/Town
ASL FC	Jaipur
Brothers United	Jaipur
Jaipur City FC	Jaipur
Jethri FC	Sikar
Rihan Football Academy	Ajmer
Sunrise FC	Sirohi
Zinc Football	Udaipur

Locations of the R-League A Division teams

== Media coverage ==
Period	TV/Streaming channel
2019–20	None
2021–	Sportscast India

== Champions ==
=== Winners by season ===
Season	Club
2019	Rajasthan United
2021	Zinc Football
2022	Jaipur Elite
2023–24	Jaipur Elite
2024–25	Zinc Football
2025–26	Zinc Football

=== Performance by clubs ===
Club	Titles	Winning seasons
Zinc Football	3	2021, 2024–25, 2025–26
Jaipur Elite	2	2022, 2023–24
Rajasthan United	1	2019

=== Clubs Promoted to I-League 3 ===
Season	Club
2023–24 I-League 3	Jaipur Elite
2024–25 I-League 3	Jaipur Elite
2025–26 I-League 3	Zinc Football
