= Techtro Swades United FC =

Indian professional association football club based in Una, Himachal Pradesh

Techtro Swades United
- Full name: Techtro Swades United Football Club
- Nickname: The Lions
- Short name: TSUFC
- Founded: 29 August 2020; 6 years ago
- Ground: Khad Football Ground, Una, Himachal Pradesh
- President: Himanshu Bhatt
- Head coach: Sumit Kumar
- League: I-League 3 Himachal Football League
Home colours	Away colours	Third colours

Departments of Techtro Swades United FC
Football (Men's)	Football (Women's)	Football (Reserves)	Futsal

Techtro Swades United Football Club is an Indian professional football club founded in Solan, Himachal Pradesh. The club currently competes in the I-League 3 and the Himachal Football League. The club was established on 29 August 2020, and began their first competitive season in the HFL.

== History ==
The club was founded by Neeraj Kholiya, a football enthusiast who started his journey by creating a YouTube channel in 2014, where he reviewed tech products. Later, he decided to create content related to Indian Football. He formed Techtro Lucknow in 2019, which started competing in the Lucknow Super Division. Techtro Swades United FC was established in order to expand the footballing landscape to a new state where potential footballers could get better opportunities.

In August 2020, Techtro Swades United was launched digitally and became the first ever professional football club from Himachal Pradesh. Minerva Academy became the strategic partner of the club. They appointed Surinder Singh as technical director, and Yan Law as the first ever head coach.

They finished as runners-up in the first edition of Himachal Football League, after losing 2–0 to Himachal FC in the final match. They earned the eligibility to play in 2020–21 season of the I-League 2nd Division, however were not selected. Their women's team finished as the Champions in the first edition of Himachal Women's League 2021. Thus earning the eligibility to play in Indian Women's League. In 2025, defender Kanishka Mazumdar led TSUFC to the Himachal Men's Senior Division League Title with 15 goals out of the 97 the team scored in 14 matches, thus qualifying for I-League 3.

== Crest and colours ==
The crest of Techtro Swades United features the faces of three Asiatic lions in resemblance to the Emblem of Himachal Pradesh as well as the State Emblem of India. On the head of the lions sits the crown which is in the shape of Lotus- the national flower of India and it also resembles the mighty Himalayas. The entire logo is made by using just circles, where many circles are met to make a part or multiple elements of the logo.

The official home colours of the team are red and blue, and the away colours are white and blue. The third kit was of purple and blue. All the three kits consist of patterns resembling the culture of Himachal Pradesh.

== Ownership ==
Techtro Swades United is organised at unique fan-owned model, avoiding limited company hierarchy.

== Honours ==
=== Domestic league ===
- Himachal Football League
  - Champions: 2022
  - Runners-up: 2020

=== Other ===
- All India invitational tournament Gazipur
  - Champion (1): 2021

== Affiliated clubs ==
The following clubs are currently associated with Techtro Swades United FC:

- (India) Minerva Academy FC (2020–present)
- (India) Techtro Lucknow FC (2020–present)
- (India) Delhi FC (2020–present)

== Other departments ==
=== Youth men's ===
The U17 team of Techtro Swades took part in the group stages of 2022–23 U-17 Youth Cup.

== See also ==
- List of football clubs in India
