= Himachal Football League =

Men's professional football league in the Indian state of Himachal Pradesh

Himachal Pradesh Football League
- Organising body: Himachal Pradesh Football Association (HPFA)
- Founded: 2020; 6 years ago
- Country: India
- Number of clubs: 10
- Level on pyramid: 5
- Promotion to: I-League 3
- Current champions: Techtro Swades United FC
- Broadcaster(s): SportsCast India (YouTube)

The Himachal Pradesh Football League is founded by Himachal Pradesh Football Association (HPFA) in 2020 as the top state-level football league in the Indian state of Himachal Pradesh and the 5th tier in Indian football league system.

A total of 10 teams compete in the league, which are divided into two groups of 5, with the table-toppers from each group advancing into the final. The inaugural edition commenced on 25 November 2020.

== Inaugural season ==
Club	City/Town
Himachal FC	Shimla
Khad FC	Khad
Paonta United FC	Paonta
Sai Kangra FA	Kangra
Shahpur FC	Shahpur
Shimla FC	Shimla
Shiva FC	
Summer Hill United FC	Shimla
Techtro Swades United FC	Una
Venga Boys Kullu FC	Kullu
