= Zinc Football Academy =

Indian association football club based in Udaipur

Zinc Football
- Full name: Zinc Football Academy
- Short name: ZF
- Founded: 2017; 9 years ago
- Ground: Mohan Kumaramangalam Stadium
- Owner: Vedanta Resources
- League: R-League A Division; I-League 2
- Website: zincfootball.com
Home colours	Away colours

Zinc Football Academy, also known as Zinc Football, is an Indian professional football club based in Udaipur, Rajasthan. The club competes in R-League A Division, the top tier league of the state. The academy was formed in 2017 as part of Hindustan Zinc Limited major stakeholder Vedanta Resources's CSR. Zinc FA was the champions of the 2021 R-League A Division season and was nominated for the I-League Second Division.

== Affiliated club(s) ==
The following club is currently affiliated with Zinc FA:

- (India) Sesa Football Academy (2018–present)

== Honours ==
=== League ===
- R-League A Division
  - Champions (2): 2021, 2024–25

=== Cup ===
- Hot Weather Football Championship
  - Runners-up (1): 2022

=== Women's ===
- Rajasthan Women's League
  - Champions (1): 2025–26

== Youth team ==
Club's U17 team competes in various nationwide tournaments including the Youth League.

=== Honours ===
- Elite Youth Cup Ahmedabad
  - Champions (1): 2022
- All India U17 Administrator's Challenge Cup
  - Third place (1): 2022

== See also ==
- List of football clubs in India
