= Women's football in India =

- Country: India
- Governing body: All India Football Federation
- National teams: Women's national team India U-20 Women's; India U-17 Women's; India Futsal Women's

National competitions
- List: Senior; Rajmata Jijabai Trophy; National Games Football; U19; Dr. Talimeren Ao Trophy; U17; U17 Women's Youth League; Sub Junior Girls' National Football Championship; Inter-School; Subroto Cup

Club competitions
- List: Indian Women's League (1st tier); Indian Women's League 2 (2nd tier); State leagues (3rd tier)

International competitions
- List: Clubs; AFC Women's Champions League; SAFF Women's Club Championship; Women's national team; AFC Women's Asian Cup: Runners-up (1979, 1983); Asian Games: Group Stage (1998, 2014, 2022); SAFF Women's Championship: Champions (2010, 2012, 2014, 2016, 2019); South Asian Games: Champions (2010, 2016, 2019); Women's U-20 national team; AFC U-20 Women's Asian Cup: Quarter-finals (2004); SAFF U-20 Women's Championship: Champions (2022, 2024); Women's U-17 national team; FIFA U-17 Women's World Cup: Group Stage (2022); AFC U-17 Women's Asian Cup: Group Stage (2005); SAFF U-17 Women's Championship: Champions (2018, 2019, 2025)

Women's football in India is growing in popularity under All India Football Federation, despite the earlier long-term governing body's inability to provide sufficient funds for the game.

== History ==
=== Early history ===
The reportedly first women's football match in then British India was organised in Burma (then a province of British Raj) on 23 July 1926 to raise funds for a charity Akyab Relief Fund. The match was held at Municipal Ground at Myaungmya between the sides hailing from the villages of Maungdi and Sinchaung, with the players recruited from the students and staff of the American Baptist Mission and Karen Schools. Maungdi won the game 3–0.

23 July 1926

Maungdi	3–0	Sinchaung
	Report

Municipal Ground, Myaungmya, Burma, British India
Referee: Mrs. Beale

The first instance of women's football in the Indian provinces occurred in Bengal in the late 1920s. Brajaranjan Ray attempted to start an annual women's football tournament in Calcutta under the aegis of the Women's Sports Association in 1929. He faced severe opposition from the society, but was successful in starting a tournament for the girls' colleges of the city of Calcutta. A handful of colleges such as the Victoria Institution, Asutosh College and Bethune College went on to participate in the tournament.

In independent India, a women's football match took place on 14 November 1955 at the National Sports Stadium in New Delhi, which was reported as the first "all-India women's football match". The match took place between Blues and Maroons with the Blues winning the match by 3–2. The match was attended by 1000 spectators.

14 November 1955

Blues	3–2	Maroons
Champa Advani; ?	Report	?

National Sports Stadium, New Delhi
Attendance: 1000

=== Consolidation in 1975 ===
Women's football has not had the relative advantage in the sport unlike the men's game, and also has not become as prevalent in the country as its male counterpart. The game was administered by the Women's Football Federation of India (WFFI) from 1975 until the early 1990s, when they were absorbed into the AIFF. However, there were complaints that women's football is treated as a poor relation to the men's game, leading to (unfulfilled) plans to de-merge the WFFI.

The women's game also has its early pioneers in the state of West Bengal. The large Kolkata teams, East Bengal and Mohun Bagan, started women's club sides in the 2000–01 season, and they participated with other teams in the Calcutta Women's Football League. However, it has been seen recently that players from Odisha and Manipur have made advances in the game. Players from these two states make up a large part of the India women's national football team. In 2000, two Indian international Sujata Kar and Alpana Seal went on to attend trial abroad for the first time, with German Frauen-Regionalliga Südwest club TSV Crailsheim Women, but the transfers fall through due to not getting work permit.

The women's national competition is played on a state vs. state basis in the India women's football championship. There are also similar national championships for junior teams like the Junior Girls National Championship (for under 19s) and the Under-17 Girls National Championship.

Some female players have become internationally recognised. Among them are Chitra Gangadharan who was the only player from India selected to play for the All Asian Star team. In February 2000, Sujata Kar and Alpana Sil became the first Indian footballers to sign a contract outside India. They signed with the German team TSV Crailsheim, but had to return after a month due to problems with the clearance of their international transfer.

Until 1983, women's football took part in international tournaments like the AFC Women's Asian Cup. For example, the team won silver in 1980 at Calicut. In later years it had become poor in status just like its male counterpart. During the 2003 AFC Women's Championship, the Indian team were embarrassed by a 12–0 defeat to China.

The poor support of the national team by the AIFF became evident, when the team's trip to Germany was only made possible by Non Resident Indians in the country, and by the support of the German Football Association. Furthermore, championships are held in remote locations, and national media coverage is said to be restricted to state and local newspapers.

The women's game reached a new low in June 2009 when FIFA delisted the side from its world rankings for being out of action for more than 18 months. This comes at a time when the game was gaining in popularity amongst the younger generation as evident by the local leagues conducted around the country. The concluded Mumbai Women's Football League 2009–10 organised by the (MDFA) was a major success and featured many talented players who had played for the national team. Furthermore, the popularity of the event gave hope that the women's game could rise in India. The India women's national football team, organised by the All India Football Federation, was revived after being dormant for several years.

One of the barriers to the sport growing is that many women experience prejudice for playing the sport.

On 17 December 2014, general secretary of the All India Football Federation, Kushal Das, gave a presentation on the future of women's football in India during a meeting with FIFA. During his presentation, Das stated that the goal for women's football from 2014 to 2017 was to increase the ranking of the national team overall and in Asia, start a professional women's league and qualify for youth AFC championships.

== National competitions ==
Over the years the Indian Women's Football Championship has been the major championship among state teams.

On 21 April 2016, over a year after the AIFF started plans for a women's football league, the AIFF President, Praful Patel, said that a women's football league would kick off in October 2016 with six teams to be decided, with the goal to expand to eight teams by 2017. Just over two months later, on 5 July 2016, the AIFF organized a workshop to discuss the India women's national team and discuss the proposed women's football league. Five Indian Super League sides (Delhi Dynamos, Chennaiyin FC, Kerala Blasters, FC Pune City, Atletico de Kolkata) and three I-League teams (Bengaluru FC, Aizawl FC, Mumbai FC) attended the workshop. It was announced that the league would feature the eight teams in the league and two other spots would be determined through a pre-qualification round.

On 14 October, the AIFF announced that the preliminary rounds for the Indian Women's League would begin on 17 October 2016 in which ten teams are split into two groups of five teams each, with the winner from each group qualifying for the national finals.

12 clubs participated for the 4th season of Indian Women's League. State women's leagues organized by various state federations acted as the qualifier this season. In addition to these, the Rest of India zone champions has been awarded a place in the final round. Gokulam Kerala defeated FC Alakhpura 9–1 over two legs to secure a place in the Group stage.

== League pyramid ==
The women's football league system in India currently consists of 1 top tier national league i.e Indian Women's League, organised by the All India Football Federation (AIFF). From tier 2 are the State football leagues, organised by regional state associations under AIFF affiliation, in Indian league tier pyramid.

Level	National leagues																										
1	Indian Women's League; 8 clubs – ↓ 2 relegations																										
2	Indian Women's League 2; 15 clubs – 2 promotions ↑↓ 9 relegations																										
	State leagues																										
	State level	Karnataka	Maharastra			West Bengal	Delhi	Meghalaya	Tamil Nadu	Assam	Goa	Manipur	Odisha	Jharkhand	Punjab	Sikkim	Mizoram	Arunachal Pradesh	Bihar	Chhattisgarh	Gujarat	Haryana	Himachal Pradesh	Kerala	Madhya Pradesh	Puducherry	Tripura
3	1	Karnataka Women's Super Division ↑promote ↓relegate	Maharashtra State Senior Women's Football League ↑promote			CWFL Premier Division A ↑promote ↓relegate	Delhi Women's Premier League ↑promote ↓relegate	Meghalaya Women's State League ↑promote	Tamil Nadu Women's League ↑promote	Assam Women's League ↑promote	Goa Women's League ↑promote	Manipur Women's League ↑promote	Odisha Women's League ↑promote	JSA Women's League ↑promote	Punjab Women's League ↑promote	Sikkim Women's Football League ↑promote	Mizoram Women's League ↑promote	Arunachal Women's League ↑promote	Bihar State Women's League ↑promote	Chhattisgarh State Women's Football League ↑promote	Gujarat State Women's League ↑promote	Haryana Women's Football League ↑promote	Himachal Women's League ↑promote	Kerala Women's League ↑promote	Madhya Pradesh Women's Premier League ↑promote	Pondicherry Women's League ↑promote	Tripura Women's Football League ↑promote
4	2	Karnataka Women's A Division	MFA Women's Premier League	PDFA Women's League	Kolhapur Women's League	CWFL Premier Division B	Delhi Women's Championship	SSA Women's Football League	1 division																		
5	3	Karnataka Women's B Division	MFA Women's Super League	2 divisions					1 division																		

== Leagues ==
=== National leagues ===
- Indian Women's League
- Indian Women's League 2

=== State leagues ===
- Arunachal Women's League
- Assam Women's League
- Bihar State Women's League
- Calcutta Women's Football League
- Chhattisgarh State Women's Football League
- Delhi Women's League
- Goa Women's League
- Gujarat State Women's League
- Himachal Women's League
- Karnataka Women's League
- Kerala Women's League
- Ladakh Women's Football Premier League
- Madhya Pradesh Women's Premier League
- Maharashtra State Senior Women's Football League
- Manipur Women's League
- Meghalaya Women's State League
- Mizoram Women's League
- Odisha Women's League
- Pondicherry Women's League
- Punjab Women's League
- Sikkim Women's Football League
- SSA Women's Football League
- Tamil Nadu Women's League
- Tripura Women's Football League

== National championships ==
- Senior Women's National Football Championship (Rajmata Jijabai Trophy)
- Junior Girls' National Football Championship (Dr. Talimeren Ao Trophy)
- Sub Junior Girls' National Football Championship

== See also ==
- Football in India
- Indian football league system
- History of Indian football
