= All India Football Federation =

National governing body of association football in India

AFC
- Short name: AIFF
- Founded: 23 June 1937; 89 years ago
- Headquarters: Dwarka, Delhi
- FIFA affiliation: 1948
- AFC affiliation: 1954
- SAFF affiliation: 1997
- President: Kalyan Chaubey
- Vice-President: N. A. Haris
- General Secretary: Anilkumar Prabhakaran
- Website: the-aiff.com

All India Football Federation (AIFF) is the governing body of football, futsal and beach soccer in India. It is a member of FIFA, and is affiliated with the Asian Football Confederation and the South Asian Football Federation.

It is affiliated with the Ministry of Youth Affairs and Sports, Government of India. India men's and women's football teams are governed by the AIFF, and represent India in various international football tournaments.

The AIFF manages, sanctions, conducts, schedules and runs all national level football tournaments and leagues in India, including Santosh Trophy, Indian Super League, Indian Football League, I-League 2, I-League 3, Super Cup, Durand Cup, Rajmata Jijabai Trophy, Indian Women's League, Indian Women's League 2, National Beach Soccer Championship, Futsal Club Championship, Reliance Foundation Development League, Youth League and others. The federation also indirectly manages local football competitions through its member associations.

== History ==
Before the formation of the All India Football Federation (AIFF), the de facto ruling body for association football in India was the Indian Football Association (IFA). The IFA was founded in 1893 and ran the game in the Bengal region. The federation was mainly governed by Englishmen and served as the most powerful football body in the country during the early 20th century.

The IFA stated efforts to form a countrywide football federation in 1935 when the federation, as well as seven other associations, met at a conference but consensus could not be reached. After differences of opinion and other conflicts were resolved, a meeting was conducted in March 1937 which would serve to be the beginning of the start of the AIFF. The AIFF was officially founded on 23 June 1937 after representatives from the nine regional football associations met at the Army Headquarters in Shimla. Namely, the nine regional football associations were the IFA, Army Sports Control Board, North West India Football Association, Bihar Olympic Association, WIFA, Madras Football Association, United Provinces Sports Control Board, Mysore Football Association, and Ajmer and Mewar Football Association.

After the launch of the national football federation, the idea of an India national football team did not gain much momentum until after India's independence in 1947. Select Indian teams did participate in tours of Australia, Burma, Afghanistan, and South Africa but none were officially part of the national team. In 1948, one year after independence and 11 since forming as a football association, the AIFF gained affiliation with FIFA, the governing body for football around the world. Later that year, the national team was officially formed and participated in their first official tournament, the 1948 Summer Olympics.

In 1950, the national team automatically qualified for the 1950 FIFA World Cup which was to be held in Brazil after all the teams in India's qualification group withdrew. However, prior to the tournament, India withdrew, citing the reason as due to lack of funding. Other reasons given for India's withdrawal included that the AIFF valued the Summer Olympics more than FIFA World Cup at that time and that the players playing mainly barefooted, though the later is just a tale. In 1952, during the Olympics in Finland, India was defeated in the first round by Yugoslavia 10–1. This defeat made the AIFF make it mandatory for players on the national team to wear football boots. In 1954, the AIFF played an active role in promoting football in Asia when they were one of the founding members of the Asian Football Confederation. India took part in four straight Olympic football tournaments between 1948 and 1960 but have failed to qualify since. In 1985, India started to participate in World Cup qualifiers again but have failed to make it to the tournament.

In 1977, the AIFF started the Federation Cup which was the first club based national tournament in the country. The Santosh Trophy, the national tournament for state teams, was started in 1941.

In 1996, the AIFF began the first national league in the country, the semi-professional National Football League. Before this, most clubs played in state leagues or select nationwide tournaments.

In 2006, the AIFF reformatted the league as the I-League in an effort to professionalise the game. However, during the following seasons, the league suffered from a lack of popularity due to poor marketing.

In September 2006, the AIFF signed a 10-year television and media contract with Zee Sports. The deal would make Zee broadcast the National Football League, later the I-League, and other tournaments organised by the AIFF and selected India's international matches. However, in October 2010, the deal between the AIFF and Zee Sports was terminated after differences between both parties related to payment and marketing of football in India.

On 9 December 2010, it was announced that the AIFF had signed a new 15-year, ₹700 crore deal with Reliance Industries and the International Management Group.

It received the AFC President's Recognition Award for Grassroots Football (Silver) for its unwavering commitment to football growth at the grassroots in October 2024. It did better this time compared to its bronze award it received at the last ceremony of the AFC awards.

=== FIFA Suspension ===
On 16 August 2022, the FIFA Council unanimously decided to suspend All India Football Federation with immediate effect due to undue influence from third parties, which constitutes a serious violation of the FIFA Statutes. As a result, India was temporarily excluded from next AFC Asia Cup edition until the suspension got lifted before the tournament began. In response to the ban, AIFF agreed to hold an election on 2 September to restore India's participation in FIFA once it got a new administration. On 27 August, FIFA lifted suspension on India, after the government agreed to end its interference in the AIFF, allowing the AIFF administration to resume activities.

== Administration ==
Foundation
Governance & administration

General body
Executive committee	Standing committee & Judicial bodies
President
Secretary General
AIFF secretariat
Strategy & planning
Football Development	Business & marketing

=== Delegates ===
The following are on the board of the directors at the AIFF.

Name	Position
(India) Kalyan Chaubey (Note: Executive Committee members)	President
(India) Nalapad Ahmed Haris	Vice-president
Vacant	Secretary General
(India) Satyanarayan Muthyalu	Deputy secretary
(India) Kipa Ajay	Treasurer
(India) Syed Sabir Pasha	Technical director
(India) Prashant J. Singh	Head of players' development
(India) Ashish V. Pandey	Grassroots manager
(India) Sarthak Mishra	State development manager
(India) Shveta Sharma	Coaching education
(India) Aman Dubey	Coaching education
(India) Shubham Gurung	Technical coordinator
(India) Khalid Jamil	Head coach (senior men's)
(India) Crispin Chettri	Head coach (senior women's)
(India) Jaydeep Basu	Media director
(India) Ravishankar J.	Referee coordinator

=== Technical committee ===
- IM Vijayan (Note: Executive committee member) (Note: Co-opted former player) – Chairperson
- Shabbir Ali – Deputy chairperson
- Baichung Bhutia
- Eugeneson Lyngdoh
- Climax Lawrence
- Harjinder Singh
- Arun Malhotra
- Santosh Singh
- Pinky Bompal Magar (Note: Co-opted Eminent Former players)
- Victor Amalraj
- Thongam Tababi Devi

=== League committee ===
- Lalnghinglova Hmar – Chairperson
- Arif Ali – Deputy chairperson
- Santanu Pujari
- Amit Chaudhary
- Reginold Vargese
- K. P. Singh
- Kiran Chowgule
- Nizamuddin

=== Development committee ===
- Avijit Paul – Chairperson
- Mulrajsinh Chudasama – Deputy chairperson
- Vijay Bali
- Ratankumar Singh Moirangthem
- S. Dhanasegar
- Muhammed Rafeek T. K. M.
- Liaqat Ali
- Jesiah Villavarayar
- Mohd. Shahid

=== Beach soccer committee ===
- Jignesh Patil – Chairperson
- KI Nizammudin – Deputy chairperson
- Anup Patra
- Bruno Coutinho
- Md. Ikram
- Upen Patel
- Dilip Singh Shekhawat
- Sanjay Mehshack
- Santosh Kumar
- G. P. Palguna

=== Advisory committee ===
- Shabbir Ali – Chairperson
- G. P. Palguna – Deputy chairperson
- Gurdev Singh
- Atanu Bhattacharya
- Irungbam Surkumar Singh
- Victor Manjila
- RP Singh
- Arun Singh Rajput

=== Futsal committee ===
- Vijay Bali – Chairperson
- Amit Khemani – Deputy chairperson
- Kuljit Singh
- Lalrengpuia
- Syed Husnain Ali Naqvi
- Ravinder Prasad Singh
- Naresh Singh Rana
- S. Achu
- B. S. Mehra
- Chung Chung Bhutia
- Mohammad Shahid Jabbar

=== Referee committee ===
- Sankar Komaleeswaran, Chairperson
- Sundarraj Balu – Deputy chairperson
- Chaitali Paul
- Srikrishna Coimbatore Ramaswamy
- Mohd. Kamil
- Sethumadhavan Chozhakkad
- Subrata Sarkar

=== Finance committee ===
- Menla Ethanpa – Chairperson
- Maloji Raje Chhatrapati – Deputy chairperson
- L. V. Lalthantluanga

=== Other members ===
- Valanka Natasha Alemão – Chairperson, women's committee
- Monoranjan Bhattacharya
- Savio Medeira – Head of coaching education
- Kiran Kumar Kulkarni – Chairperson, medical committee
- Malojiraje Chhatrapati
- Mohan Lal
- K. Neibou Sekhose
- Deepak Sharma
- Syed Imtiaz Husain
- Syed Hasnain Ali Naqvi

== National teams ==
=== Men ===
- India national football team
- India national under-23 football team
- India national under-20 football team
- India national under-17 football team
- India national under-15 football team
- India national beach soccer team
- India national futsal team

=== Women ===
- India women's national football team
- India women's national under-20 football team
- India women's national under-17 football team
- India women's national futsal team

== Affiliated associations and leagues ==
There are currently 36 state associations and 2 affiliates with the All India Football Federation.

=== Full members ===
No.	Association	State/UT	President	Status
1	All Manipur Football Association	Manipur	Db Kowar Lamkang	1st term (2026-2030)
2	Andaman and Nicobar Football Association	Andaman and Nicobar Islands	Tahir Ali	3rd term (2019-2023, 2023-2027); 1st term as Secretary (2015-2019)
3	Andhra Pradesh Football Association	Andhra Pradesh	Kotagiri Sridhar	1st term (2026-2030)
4	Arunachal Pradesh Football Association	Arunachal Pradesh	Pema Khandu	3rd term (2019-2022, 2022-2026, 2026-2030)
5	Assam Football Association	Assam	Naba Kumar Doley	2nd term (2019-2023, 2023-2027)
6	Bihar Football Association	Bihar	Jai Bahadur Singh	1st term (2026-2030)
7	Chandigarh Football Association	Chandigarh	K. P. Singh	3rd term (2018-2022, 2022-2026, 2026-2030)
8	Chhattisgarh Football Association	Chhattisgarh	R. Prasanna	1st term (2024-2028)
9	Dadra & Nagar Haveli and Daman & Diu Football Association	Dadra & Nagar Haveli and Daman & Diu	Walter Edward Pereira	2nd term (2026-2030); 1st term as Secretary (2022-2026)
10	Football Association of Odisha	Odisha	Tankadhar Tripathy	1st term (2025-2028)
11	Football Delhi	Delhi	Bahadur Singh Mehra	1st term (2026-2030)
12	Goa Football Association	Goa	Valanka Alemao	1st term (2026-2030)
13	Gujarat State Football Association	Gujarat	Parimal Nathwani	3rd term (2019-2023, 2023-2025, 2025-2029)
14	Haryana Football Association	Haryana	Vacant	Election due
15	Himachal Pradesh Football Association	Himachal Pradesh	Sunil Sharma	1st term (2023-2027)
16	Indian Football Association	West Bengal	Vacant	Election due
17	Jammu and Kashmir Football Association	Jammu and Kashmir	Vacant	Election due
18	Jharkhand Football Association	Jharkhand	Vacant	Election due
19	Karnataka State Football Association	Karnataka	N. A. Haris	3rd term (2019-2023, 2023-2027); 1st term as Acting president (2017-2019)
20	Kerala Football Association	Kerala	Navas Meeran	1st term (2023-2027)
21	Ladakh Football Association	Ladakh	Stanzin Sonam	1st term (2026-2030)
22	Lakshadweep Football Association	Lakshadweep	K. Mohammed Ali	Election due 10 years since 2016
23	Madhya Pradesh Football Association	Madhya Pradesh	Alok Chansoria	1st term (2026-2030)
24	Meghalaya Football Association	Meghalaya	Hamletson Dohling	1st term (2023-2027)
25	Mizoram Football Association	Mizoram	Lalnghinglova Hmar	4th term without cooling-off period (2024-2028); 3 term as Secretary (2012-2024)
26	Nagaland Football Association	Nagaland	Neibou Sekhose	3rd term (2020 Dec-2024 Dec, 2025 Jan-2029 Jan); 1st term as Secretary (Pre 2020)
27	Pondicherry Football Association	Puducherry	D. Nestor	Unknown president before 2020
28	Punjab Football Association	Punjab	Suryajit Singh	1st term (2026-2030)
29	Rajasthan Football Association	Rajasthan	Manvendra Singh	3rd term (2016-2020, 2020-2024, 2024-2028)
30	Sikkim Football Association	Sikkim	Menla Ethenpa	2nd term (2022-2026, 2026-2030)
31	Tamil Nadu Football Association	Tamil Nadu	Vacant	Election due
32	Telangana Football Association	Telangana	Mohammed Ali Rafath	3rd term (2015-2019, 2019-2023, 2023-2027)
33	Tripura Football Association	Tripura	Pranab Sarkar	Election due 1st term (2022-2026)
34	Uttar Pradesh Football Sangh	Uttar Pradesh	Arvind Menon	2nd term (2020-2024, 2024-2028)
35	Uttarakhand State Football Association	Uttarakhand	Vacant	Election due
36	Western India Football Association	Maharashtra	Praful Patel	Election due 20 years as president

=== Affiliate members ===
No.	Association	Department	President	Tenure
1	Railways Sports Promotion Board	Indian Railways	R. Mohanraja	July 2026 — July 2028
2	Services Sports Control Board	Indian Armed Forces	Lt Gen Vipul Singhal	April 2026 — April 2029

=== State leagues list ===
==== Men's ====
- Assam State Premier League (Assam)
- Bangalore Super Division (Karnataka)
- Bihar Soccer League (Bihar)
- Calcutta Football League (West Bengal)
- Chandra Memorial League (Tripura)
- Chennai Football League (Tamil Nadu)
- Chhattisgarh State Men's Football League Championship (Chhattisgarh)
- Dadra & Nagar Haveli Senior Division League and Daman and Diu Senior Division League (Dadra and Nagar Haveli and Daman and Diu)
- FAO League (Odisha)
- Delhi Football League (Delhi)
- Goa Football League (Goa)
- Gujarat SFA Club Championship (Gujarat)
- Haryana Men's Football League (Haryana)
- Himachal Football League (Himachal Pradesh)
- Indrajit Namchoom Arunachal League (Arunachal Pradesh)
- Jammu & Kashmir Premier Football League (Jammu and Kashmir)
- JSA League (Jharkhand)
- Kavaratti League (Lakshadweep)
- Kerala Premier League (Kerala)
- Ladakh Super League (Ladakh)
- Lucknow Super Division (Uttar Pradesh)
- Madhya Pradesh Premier League (Madhya Pradesh)
- Manipur Premier League (Manipur)
- Meghalaya State League (Meghalaya)
- Mizoram Premier League (Mizoram)
- Mumbai Football League, Pune Football League, NDFA League, Kolhapur Senior League, Thane Super Division (Maharashtra)
- Nagaland Premier League (Nagaland)
- Punjab State Super Football League (Punjab)
- Pondicherry Men's League Championship (Pondicherry)
- Rahim League A Division (Telangana)
- Rajasthan State Men's League (Rajasthan)
- Sikkim Premier Division League (Sikkim)
- Uttarakhand Super League (Uttarakhand)

==== Women's ====
- Assam Women's League (Assam)
- Arunachal Women's League (Arunachal)
- Bihar State Women's League (Bihar)
- Calcutta Women's Football League (West Bengal)
- Chhattisgarh State Women's Football League Championship (Chhattisgarh)
- FD Women's League (Delhi)
- Goa Women's League (Goa)
- Gujarat State Women's League (Gujarat)
- Haryana Women's Football League (Haryana)
- Himachal Women's League (Himachal)
- JSA Women's League (Jharkhand)
- Karnataka Women's League (Karnataka)
- Kerala Women's League (Kerala)
- Madhya Pradesh Women's Premier League (Madhya Pradesh)
- Manipur Women's League (Manipur)
- Meghalaya Women's State League (Meghalaya)
- Mizoram Women's League (Mizoram)
- Nagaland Women's Football League (Nagaland)
- Odisha Women's League (Odisha)
- Punjab Women's League (Punjab)
- Pondicherry Women's League (Pondicherry)
- Sikkim Women's Super League (Sikkim)
- Tamil Nadu Women's League (Tamil Nadu)
- WIFA Women's Football League (Maharashtra)

== Competitions ==
=== International level ===
==== Men's senior ====
- Intercontinental Cup
- Tri-Nation Series

==== Women's senior ====
- Gold Cup

=== National level ===
==== Men's senior ====
- Santosh Trophy
- National Beach Soccer Championship

==== Men's youth ====
- Swami Vivekananda NFC (U-20)
- B.C. Roy Trophy (U-15)
- Mir Iqbal Hussain Trophy (U-13)
- Subroto Cup (inter-school)

==== Women's senior ====
- Rajmata Jijabai Trophy

==== Women's youth ====
- Dr. Talimeren Ao Trophy (U-19)
- Sub Junior Girls' National Football Championship (U-16)
- Subroto Cup (inter-school)

=== Club level ===
==== Men's senior ====
- Indian Super League
- Indian Football League
- I-League 2
- I-League 3
- Federation Cup
- Durand Cup
- Futsal Club Championship

==== Men's youth ====
- RF Development League (U-21)
- AIFF Youth League (U-17)
- Kalinga Arrows Cup (U-16)
- Junior League (U-15)
- Sub-Junior League (U-13)

==== Women's senior ====
- Indian Women's League
- Indian Women's League 2

==== Women's youth ====
- AIFF Women's Youth League (U-15)

== Current title holders ==
Competition	Year	Champions	Title	Next edition
Senior (men's)
Santosh Trophy	2025–26	Services	National Champion	2026–27
National Games	2025	Kerala	National Games Champion	2027
National Beach Soccer Championship	2023	Kerala	National Beach Soccer Champion	
Indian Super League	2025–26	East Bengal FC	ISL Champion	2026–27
Indian Football League	2025–26	Diamond Harbour FC	Indian Football League Champion	2026–27
I-League 2	2025–26	Delhi FC	I-League 2 Champion	2026–27
I-League 3	2025–26	FC Banaras Baghpat	I-League 3 Champion	2026–27
AIFF Super Cup	2025-26	Goa	Super Cup Champion	2026–27
Durand Cup	2026	East Bengal FC	Durand Cup Champion	2027
Futsal Club Championship	2024–25	Goal Hunterz	Futsal Club Champion	2025–26
Senior (women's)
Rajmata Jijabai Trophy	2025–26	Manipur	National Women's Champion	2026–27
National Games	2025	Haryana	National Games Women's Champion	2027
Indian Women's League	2024–25	East Bengal	IWL Champion	2025–26
Indian Women's League 2	2024–25	Garhwal United	IWL 2 Champion	2025–26
Youth (men's)
Swami Vivekananda NFC (U20 Men)	2024–25	Delhi	National U-20 Champion	2025–26
B.C. Roy Trophy (U15 Men)	2025–26	Manipur	National U-15 Champion	2026–27
Mir Iqbal Hussain Trophy (U13 Men)	2025–26	West Bengal	National U-13 Champion	2026–27
Reliance Foundation Development League (U-21)	2025-26	Bengaluru	U-21 Champion	2026–27
Youth League (U-17)	2024–25	Punjab	U-17 league Champion	2025–26
Youth League (U-15)	2024–25	Punjab	U-15 league Champion	2025–26
Youth League (U-13)	2024–25	Minerva Academy	U-13 league Champion	2025–26
Youth (women's)
Dr. Talimeren Ao Trophy (U19 Women)	2025–26	Manipur	National U-19 Champion	2026–27
Sub Junior Girls' National Football Championship (U16 Women)	2025–26	Jharkhand	National U-16 Champion	2026–27

== Indian Football League pyramid ==
=== Men's ===
Level	National leagues																																					
1	Indian Super League; 14 clubs clubs – 1 promotion ↑↓ 1 relegation																																					
2	Indian Football League; 10 clubs – 1 promotion ↑↓ 2 relegation																																					
3	I-League 2; 9 clubs – 2 promotions ↑↓ 2 relegations																																					
4	I-League 3; 25 clubs (5 zones) – 2 promotions ↑↓ provisional relegations																																					
	State leagues																																					
	State level	West Bengal	Assam	Delhi	Tamil Nadu	Maharastra					Goa	Jammu and Kashmir	Karnataka	Manipur	Meghalaya	Odisha	Jharkhand	Punjab	Sikkim	Tripura	Kerala	Ladakh	Mizoram	Arunachal Pradesh	Bihar	Chhattisgarh	Dadra and Nagar Haveli and Daman and Diu	Gujarat	Haryana	Himachal Pradesh	Lakshadweep	Madhya Pradesh	Nagaland	Puducherry	Rajasthan	Telangana	Uttar Pradesh	Uttarakhand
	State level	West Bengal	Assam	Delhi	Tamil Nadu	Mumbai	Pune	Nagpur	Kolhapur	Thane	Goa	Jammu and Kashmir	Karnataka	Manipur	Meghalaya	Odisha	Jharkhand	Punjab	Sikkim	Tripura	Kerala	Ladakh	Mizoram	Arunachal Pradesh	Bihar	Chhattisgarh	Dadra and Nagar Haveli and Daman and Diu	Gujarat	Haryana	Himachal Pradesh	Lakshadweep	Madhya Pradesh	Nagaland	Puducherry	Rajasthan	Telangana	Uttar Pradesh	Uttarakhand
5	1	CFL Premier Division ↑promote ↓relegate	Assam State Premier League ↑promote ↓relegate	Delhi Premier League ↑promote ↓relegate	CFA Senior Division ↑promote ↓relegate	Mumbai Premier League ↑promote ↓relegate	PDFA Super Division League ↑promote ↓relegate	NDFA Elite Division League ↑promote ↓relegate	Kolhapur Senior League ↑promote ↓relegate	Thane Super Division ↑promote ↓relegate	Goa Professional League ↑promote ↓relegate	J&K Premier Football League ↑promote ↓relegate	BDFA Super Division ↑promote ↓relegate	Manipur Premier League ↑promote ↓relegate	Meghalaya State League ↑promote ↓relegate	FAO Diamond League ↑promote ↓relegate	JSA League Premier Division ↑promote ↓relegate	Punjab State Super Football League ↑promote ↓relegate	SFA A-Division S-League ↑promote ↓relegate	Chandra Memorial League ↑promote ↓relegate	Kerala Premier League ↑promote ↓relegate	Ladakh Super League ↑promote ↓relegate	Mizoram Premier League ↑promote ↓relegate	Indrajit Namchoom Arunachal League ↑promote	Bihar State Soccer League ↑promote	Chhattisgarh State Men's Football League Championship ↑promote	DD Senior Division League / DNH Senior Division League ↑promote	Gujarat SFA Club Championship ↑promote	Haryana Men's Football League ↑promote	Himachal Football League ↑promote	Kavaratti Football League ↑promote	Madhya Pradesh Premier League ↑promote	Nagaland Super League ↑promote	Pondicherry Men's League Championship ↑promote	Rajasthan State Men's League ↑promote	Rahim League A Division ↑promote	Lucknow Super Division ↑promote	Uttarakhand Super League ↑promote
6	2	CFL 1st Division ↑promote 2 ↓relegate 2	Assam Club Championship / Guwahati Premier Football League ↑promote ↓relegate	FD Senior Division League ↑promote ↓relegate	First Division ↑promote ↓relegate	Mumbai Super League ↑promote ↓relegate	PDFA First Division League ↑promote ↓relegate	NDFA Super Division League ↑promote ↓relegate	1 division		GFA 1st Division League ↑promote ↓relegate	J&K Super Division ↑promote ↓relegate	BDFA A Division ↑promote ↓relegate	AMFA Cup ↑promote ↓relegate	Shillong Premier League ↑promote ↓relegate	FAO Gold League ↑promote ↓relegate	JSA League Super Division ↑promote ↓relegate	Punjab State League Second Division ↑promote ↓relegate	Sikkim B Division ↑promote ↓relegate	Chandra Memorial B Division League ↑promote ↓relegate	Kerala Premier League Second Division ↑promote	Ladakh District Leagues ↑promote	Mizoram 1st Division League ↑promote	1 division														
7	3	CFL 2nd Division ↑promote 2 ↓relegate 2	GSA A Division Football League ↑promote ↓relegate	FD A-Division ↑promote ↓relegate	Second Division ↑promote ↓relegate	MFA First Division ↑promote ↓relegate	PDFA Second Division League ↑promote ↓relegate	NDFA Senior Division League ↑promote ↓relegate	1 division		GFA 2nd Division League ↑promote ↓relegate	J&K A-Division ↑promote ↓relegate	BDFA B Division ↑promote ↓relegate	Thangjam Birchandra-Maipakpi Memorial Winners' Cup ↑promote ↓relegate	Second Division League ↑promote ↓relegate	FAO Silver League ↑promote ↓relegate	JSA League A Division ↑promote	Punjab State League Third Division ↑promote	Sikkim C Division ↑promote	Chandra Memorial C Division League ↑promote	2 divisions			1 division														
8	4	CFL 3rd Division ↑promote 2 ↓relegate 2	GSA B Division Football League ↑promote ↓relegate	FD B-Division ↑promote ↓relegate	Third Division ↑promote ↓relegate	MFA Second Division ↑promote ↓relegate	PDFA Third Division League ↑promote ↓relegate	3 divisions	1 division		GFA 3rd Division League ↑promote	J&K B-Division ↑promote	BDFA C Division ↑promote	Manipur District Leagues ↑promote	Third Division League ↑promote	FAO 2nd Division League ↑promote	3 divisions				2 divisions			1 division														
9	5	CFL 4th Division ↑promote 2 ↓relegate 2	GSA C Division Football League ↑promote	FD C-Division ↑promote	Fourth Division ↑promote	MFA Third Division ↑promote	4 divisions	3 divisions	1 division		4 divisions						3 divisions				2 divisions			1 division														
10	6	CFL 5th Division ↑promote 2	5 divisions				4 divisions	3 divisions	1 division		4 divisions						3 divisions				2 divisions			1 division														

=== Women's ===
Level	League(s) / Division(s)																									
Level	National leagues																									
1	Indian Women's League; 7 clubs – ↓ 0 relegations																									
2	Indian Women's League 2; 8 clubs – 2 promotions ↑↓ relegations TBA																									
	State leagues																									
	State level	Karnataka	West Bengal	Delhi	Maharastra			Tamil Nadu	Assam	Goa	Manipur	Meghalaya	Odisha	Jharkhand	Punjab	Sikkim	Mizoram	Arunachal Pradesh	Bihar	Chhattisgarh	Gujarat	Haryana	Himachal Pradesh	Kerala	Madhya Pradesh	Puducherry
3	1	Karnataka Women's Super Division ↑promote ↓relegate	CWFL Premier Division A ↑promote	FD Women's Premier League ↑promote ↓relegate	WIFA Women's Football League ↑promote			Tamil Nadu Women's League ↑promote	Assam Women's League ↑promote	Goa Women's League ↑promote	Manipur Women's League ↑promote	SSA Women's Football League ↑promote	Odisha Women's League ↑promote	JSA Women's League ↑promote	Punjab Women's League ↑promote	Sikkim Women's Super League ↑promote	Mizoram Women's League ↑promote	Arunachal Women's Football Championship ↑promote	Bihar State Women's League ↑promote	Chhattisgarh State Women's Football League Championship ↑promote	Gujarat State Women's League ↑promote	Haryana Women's Football League ↑promote	Himachal Women's League ↑promote	Kerala Women's League ↑promote	Madhya Pradesh Women's Premier League ↑promote	Pondicherry Women's League ↑promote
4	2	Karnataka Women's A Division	CWFL Premier Division B	FD Women's Championship	MFA Women's League	PDFA Women's Division	Kolhapur Women's League	1 division																		
5	3	Karnataka Women's B Division	2 divisions					1 division																		

== Evolution ==
Men's
Level		Years																
Level		1888–1893		1898–1941		1941–1977	1977–1996	1996–1997	1997–2001	2001–2006	2006–2007	2007–2011	2011–2014	2014–2017	2017–2022	2022–2023	2023–2026	2026–present
Level			1893		1937	1941–1977	1977–1996	1996–1997	1997–2001	2001–2006	2006–2007	2007–2011	2011–2014	2014–2017	2017–2022	2022–2023	2023–2026	2026–present
National leagues	1	None	Formation of Indian Football Association (IFA)	State Leagues		Santosh Trophy		National Football League				I-League			Indian Super League	Indian Super League		
National leagues	1	None	Formation of Indian Football Association (IFA)	State Leagues		Santosh Trophy		National Football League				I-League			I-League	Indian Super League		
National leagues	2	None	Formation of Indian Football Association (IFA)	None	Formation of All India Football Federation (AIFF)	None			NFL Second Division			I-League 2nd Division				I-League		Indian Football League
National leagues	3	None	Formation of Indian Football Association (IFA)	None	Formation of All India Football Federation (AIFF)	None					NFL Third Division	Discontinued				I-League 2		
National leagues	4	None	Formation of Indian Football Association (IFA)	None	Formation of All India Football Federation (AIFF)	None											I-League 3	
Regional leagues	5–11	None	Formation of Indian Football Association (IFA)	None	Formation of All India Football Federation (AIFF)	State Leagues												
Cup competitions		Durand Cup																
Cup competitions							Federation Cup								AIFF Super Cup			
Cup competitions								Indian Super Cup					Discontinued					

Women's
Level		Years			
Level		1937	1991–2016	2016–2023	2023-present
National leagues	1	Formation of All India Football Federation (AIFF)	Senior Women's National Football Championship	Indian Women's League	
National leagues	2	Formation of All India Football Federation (AIFF)	None		Indian Women's League 2
Regional leagues	3–	Formation of All India Football Federation (AIFF)	State Leagues		

== Past office bearers ==
=== Presidents ===
The following is a list of presidents of AIFF:

Presidents	State FA	Tenure
Brigadier V.H.B. Majendie	Army	1937 – ?
Brigadier Dorman Smith	Army	? – ?
D. Moir	Bombay	? – ?
Moin-ul-Haq	Bihar	1948 – 1950
Pankaj Gupta	West Bengal	1950 – 1960
Manindra Nath Dutta Ray	West Bengal	1960 – 1975
Nurul Amin	Assam	1975 – 1980
Khalifa Ziauddin	Maharashtra	1980 – 1988
Priya Ranjan Dasmunsi	Bihar, Women's FA	1988 – 2008
Praful Patel	Maharashtra	2009 – 2022
Kalyan Chaubey	Gujarat	2022 – present

=== Secretaries-General ===
The following is a list of secretaries of AIFF:

Secretaries	State FA	Tenure
Major AC Wilson	Army	1937 – ?
Major JB Donaldson	Army	? – ?
EJ Turner	Bombay	? – ?
Manindra Nath Dutta Ray	Bengal	1942 – 1950
Major Lachman Singh	Army	? – ?
Khalifa Ziauddin	Maharashtra	? – ?
A. T. Vijayrangam	Mysore	? – 1980
Ashok Ghosh	West Bengal	1980 – 1988
P. P. Lakshmanan	Kerala	1988 – 1996
Kedar Nath Mour	Assam	1997 – 2000
Alberto Colaco	Goa	2000 – 2010
Kushal Das	–	2010 – 2022
Sunando Dhar (interim)	–	2022
Shaji Prabhakaran	Delhi	2022 – 2023
Satyanarayan M (interim)	Karnataka	2023 – 2024
Anilkumar Prabhakaran	Kerala	2024 – present

== Controversies ==
From 1988 to 2009, Congress party's Priya Ranjan Dasmunsi was president of AIFF. After him his fellow, then Congress and later Nationalist Congress Party's politician Praful Patel became president and ran it from 2009 to 2022 in an authoritarian manner. He was removed from the position by Supreme Court of India in May 2022 and a three members' committee was appointed to run AIFF. In their decision the judge remarked that the present state of this organisation is not in the interest of proper governance. Patel remained president of the AIFF for 16 years, without any tenure limit. He held the position in 3 terms. As per AIFF, some people dictate Indian football who serve themselves in the expenses of football sport and players. According to The Telegraph newspaper's article, there is rampant and open corruption in the All India Football Federation (AIFF) and due to this, many of the sponsors do not want to sponsor AIFF or be associated with it. And Players, coaches and officials related to football feels that the AIFF's attitude and management of this organisation have to be change, otherwise football will not improve in India.

As of 6 October 2021, since 2020 AIFF avoided elections to new president and office holders. Praful Patel is president of AIFF since 2009 and held president's post even after his legal presidency period ended.

Multiple times, FIFA have accused AIFF of outside influence in it. On 15 August 2022, FIFA suspended the federation for violating its statutes on third-party interference. India was stripped off its hosting rights for international football tournaments, including the 2022 FIFA U-17 Women's World Cup scheduled for October 2022. The Suspension was lifted on 27 August 2022. As a result, 2022 FIFA U-17 Women's World Cup scheduled for October 2022 were held as planned.

This organisation is often accused for neglecting women's football.

The AIFF's strategic roadmap, Vision 2047 outlines goals for women's football. However its financial allocation have remained heavily skewed towards the men's game, with women's national teams and competitions receiving only 16% of total federation expenditure, compared with 48% for men's.

The Indian men's national football team has never played in the FIFA World Cup but India did qualify for the 1950 FIFA World Cup which was held in Brazil. In 1950 FIFA World Cup qualification, the other teams in India's qualification group withdrew due to various reasons and India qualified as the remaining team. However, the Indian team did not participate and withdrew their name. A common myth is that India withdrew and didn't participate because FIFA did not allow Indians to play football barefoot. According to author and sports journalist Jaydeep Basu, this is completely wrong and India did not participate because AIFF did not believe that its then players had the calibre to compete against the top teams of the world. Furthermore, AIFF used to consider the Olympics more important than the FIFA World Cup. According to Basu, by not sending India's team to the 1950 FIFA World Cup, the AIFF negatively affected the development of football in India.

== See also ==
- Sport in India
- Football in Asia
- Football in India
- History of the India national football team
- AIFF Player of the Year Awards
- Indian football league system
- Futsal Association of India
