= Indian State Leagues =

State level men's association football leagues in India

- Organising body: State Football Associations
- Country: India
- Confederation: AFC
- Level on pyramid: 5 (men's); 3 (women's)
- Promotion to: I-League 3 (men's); Indian Women's League 2 (women's)
- Relegation to: Various
- Domestic cup: Durand Cup (invitational)
- Website: www.the-aiff.com
- Current: 2026–27

State football leagues in India represent the premier-state and 5th overall men's and 3rd women's tier of the Indian football league system. There are currently 36 state associations affiliated with the national governing body, the All India Football Federation (AIFF).

Most of the state associations organise and have own affiliated football competitions in their respective states. The state leagues operate as a system of promotion and relegation with the I-League 3 (men's), the Indian Women's League 2 (women's), and lower regional leagues. Clubs of top national leagues (Indian Super League and I-League) also participate in their respective state leagues, most often with youth or reserve teams.

== Eastern states' leagues ==
State/UT	Top league	
State/UT	Men's	Women's
Andaman and Nicobar Islands	—N/a	—N/a
Bihar	Bihar Soccer League	Bihar State Women's League
Chhattisgarh	Chhattisgarh State Men's Football League Championship	Chhattisgarh State Women's Football League
Jharkhand	JSA League	JSA Women's League
Odisha	FAO League	Odisha Women's League
West Bengal	Calcutta Football League	Calcutta Women's Football League

== Northern states' leagues ==
State/UT	Top league	
State/UT	Men's	Women's
Chandigarh (UT)	—N/a	—N/a
Delhi (UT)	Delhi Premier League	Delhi Women's Premier League
Haryana	Haryana Men's Football League	Haryana Women's Football League
Himachal Pradesh	Himachal Football League	Himachal Women's League
Jammu and Kashmir (UT)	Jammu and Kashmir Premier Football League	—N/a
Ladakh (UT)	Leh District Football League; Kargil District Football League	Ladakh Women's Football Premier League
Punjab	Punjab State Super League	Punjab Women's League
Rajasthan	Rajasthan State Men's League	Rajasthan Women's League
Uttarakhand	Uttarakhand Super League	Uttarakhand Women's Football League
Uttar Pradesh	Lucknow Super Division	—N/a

== North-Eastern states' leagues ==
State/UT	Top league	
State/UT	Men's	Women's
Arunachal Pradesh	Indrajit Namchoom Arunachal League	Arunachal Women's League
Assam	Assam State Premier League	Assam Women's League
Manipur	Manipur Premier League	Manipur Women's League
Meghalaya	Meghalaya State League	Meghalaya Women's State League
Mizoram	Mizoram Premier League	Mizoram Women's League
Nagaland	Nagaland Super League	—N/a
Sikkim	Sikkim Football League	Sikkim Women's Football League
Tripura	Chandra Memorial League	Tripura Women's Football League

== Southern states' leagues ==
State/UT	Top league	
State/UT	Men's	Women's
Andhra Pradesh	AP Super Cup	—N/a
Karnataka	Karnataka Super Division	Karnataka Women's League
Kerala	Kerala Premier League	Kerala Women's League
Lakshadweep (UT)	Kavaratti League	—N/a
Pondicherry (UT)	Pondicherry Football League	Pondicherry Women's League
Tamil Nadu	Chennai Football League	Tamil Nadu Women's League
Telangana	A Division Rahim League	Telangana Women’s League

== Western states' leagues ==
State/UT	Top league	
State/UT	Men's	Women's
Dadra and Nagar Haveli and Daman and Diu (UT)	Dadra & Nagar Haveli and Daman & Diu Men's State League	—N/a
Goa	Goa Football League	Goa Women's League
Gujarat	Gujarat SFA Club Championship	Gujarat State Women's League
Madhya Pradesh	Madhya Pradesh Premier League	Madhya Pradesh Women's Premier League
Maharashtra	Maharashtra State Senior Men's Football League	Maharashtra State Senior Women's Football League

== See also ==
- History of Indian football
- Football in India
- List of football clubs in India
- IFA Shield
- Durand Cup
- Super Cup
- Federation Cup
- Santosh Trophy
- Institutional League
- Futsal Club Championship
