= Indian football league system =

Interrelations of club association football leagues in India

- Country: India
- Sport: Association football
- Promotion and relegation: Yes

National system
- Federation: All India Football Federation
- Confederation: AFC
- Top division: Indian Super League (men's); Indian Women's League (women's)
- Second division: Indian Football League (men's); Indian Women's League 2 (women's)
- Cup competition: Men's: Federation Cup; Durand Cup

The Indian football league system is the league structure of football club competitions in India. The highest level of men's club football competition is the Indian Super League. The Indian Women's League, founded in 2016, is the highest level of women's football club competition in India.

== Men's ==
The Indian men's football league system consists of the top 4 national divisions organized by the All India Football Federation (AIFF). From tier 5 are the various regional state football leagues, organized by the respective state associations under the AIFF affiliation.

=== Pyramid ===
Level	National Leagues
1	Indian Super League; 14 clubs – ↓ 1 relegation
2	Indian Football League; 11 clubs – 1 promotion ↑↓ 1 relegation
3	I-League 2; 10 clubs – 2 promotions ↑↓ 1 relegation
4	I-League 3; 20 clubs – 2 promotions ↑↓ provisional relegation

State leagues
National Level	State level	West Bengal	Assam	Delhi	Tamil Nadu	Goa	Jammu and Kashmir	Karnataka	Manipur	Meghalaya	Odisha	Jharkhand	Punjab	Sikkim	Tripura	Kerala	Mizoram	Maharashtra	Ladakh	Andhra Pradesh	Arunachal Pradesh	Bihar	Chhattisgarh	Dadra and Nagar Haveli and Daman and Diu	Gujarat	Haryana	Himachal Pradesh	Lakshadweep	Madhya Pradesh	Nagaland	Puducherry	Rajasthan	Telangana	Uttar Pradesh	Uttarakhand
5	1	CFL Premier Division ↑promote ↓relegate	Assam State Premier League ↑promote ↓relegate	Delhi Premier League ↑promote ↓relegate	CFA Senior Division ↑promote ↓relegate	Goa Professional League ↑promote ↓relegate	J&K Premier Football League ↑promote ↓relegate	BDFA Super Division ↑promote ↓relegate	Manipur Premier League ↑promote ↓relegate	Meghalaya State League ↑promote ↓relegate	FAO Diamond League ↑promote ↓relegate	JSA League Premier Division ↑promote ↓relegate	Punjab State Super Football League ↑promote ↓relegate	SFA "A" Division S-League ↑promote ↓relegate	Chandra Memorial A Division League ↑promote ↓relegate	Kerala Premier League ↑promote ↓relegate	Mizoram Premier League ↑promote ↓relegate	Maharashtra State Senior Men's Football League ↑promote	Leh and Kargil Districts Football League ↑promote	Telugu Super League ↑promote	Indrajit Namchoom Arunachal League ↑promote	Bihar State Soccer League ↑promote	Chhattisgarh State Men's Football League Championship ↑promote	DNH and DD Men's State League ↑promote	Gujarat SFA Club Championship ↑promote	Haryana Men's Football League ↑promote	Himachal Football League ↑promote	Kavaratti Football League ↑promote	Madhya Pradesh Premier League ↑promote	Nagaland Super League ↑promote	Pondicherry Men's League Championship ↑promote	Rajasthan State Men's League ↑promote	Rahim League A Division ↑promote	Uttar Pradesh Football Sangh League ↑promote	Uttarakhand Super League ↑promote
6	2	CFL 1st Division ↑promote 2 ↓relegate 2	Assam Club Championship / Guwahati Premier Football League ↑promote ↓relegate	FD Senior Division League ↑promote ↓relegate	First Division ↑promote ↓relegate	GFA 1st Division League ↑promote ↓relegate	J&K Super Division ↑promote ↓relegate	BDFA A Division ↑promote ↓relegate	AMFA Cup ↑promote ↓relegate	Shillong Premier League ↑promote ↓relegate	FAO Gold League ↑promote ↓relegate	JSA League Super Division ↑promote ↓relegate	Punjab State League Second Division ↑promote ↓relegate	SFA "B" Division ↑promote ↓relegate	Chandra Memorial B Division League ↑promote ↓relegate	Kerala Premier League Second Division ↑promote	Mizoram 1st Division League ↑promote	Lucknow Super Division / Ghaziabad District League / Baghpat District League ↑promote	1 division																
7	3	CFL 2nd Division ↑promote 2 ↓relegate 2	GSA A Division Football League ↑promote ↓relegate	FD A-Division ↑promote ↓relegate	Second Division ↑promote ↓relegate	GFA 2nd Division League ↑promote ↓relegate	J&K A-Division ↑promote ↓relegate	BDFA B Division ↑promote ↓relegate	AMFA Winners' Cup ↑promote ↓relegate	Second Division League ↑promote ↓relegate	FAO Silver League ↑promote ↓relegate	JSA League A Division ↑promote	Punjab State League Third Division ↑promote	SFA "C" Division ↑promote	Chandra Memorial C Division League ↑promote	2 divisions			1 division																
8	4	CFL 3rd Division ↑promote 2 ↓relegate 2	GSA B Division Football League ↑promote ↓relegate	FD B-Division ↑promote ↓relegate	Third Division ↑promote ↓relegate	GFA 3rd Division League ↑promote	J&K B-Division ↑promote	BDFA C Division ↑promote	Manipur District Leagues ↑promote	Third Division League ↑promote	FAO 2nd Division League ↑promote	3 divisions				2 divisions			1 division																
9	5	CFL 4th Division ↑promote 2 ↓relegate 2	GSA C Division Football League ↑promote	FD C-Division ↑promote	Fourth Division ↑promote	4 divisions						3 divisions				2 divisions			1 division																
10	6	CFL 5th Division Group A ↑promote 2 ↓relegate 2	5 divisions			4 divisions						3 divisions				2 divisions			1 division																
11	7	CFL 5th Division Group B _{↑promote 2}	5 divisions			4 divisions						3 divisions				2 divisions			1 division																

=== Status evolution ===
Professional leagues
Semi-professional leagues

Year	Tier 1	Tier 2	Tier 3	Tier 4	Tier 5 and below
1898–1996	State leagues				
1996–1997	National Football League	State leagues (without top divisions)			
1997–2006	National Football League	National Football League 2nd Division	State leagues (without top divisions)		
2006–2007	National Football League	National Football League 2nd Division	National Football League 3rd Division	State leagues (without top divisions)	
2007–2017	I-League	I-League 2nd Division	State leagues (without top divisions)		
2017–2022	I-League & Indian Super League	I-League 2nd Division	State leagues (without top divisions)		
2022–2023	Indian Super League	I-League	I-League 2nd Division	State leagues (without top divisions)	
2023–2025	Indian Super League	I-League	I-League 2	I-League 3	State leagues (without top divisions)
2025–present	Indian Super League	Indian Football League	I-League 2	I-League 3	State leagues (without top divisions)

=== Tier I ===
==== National Football League (1996–2007) ====
Founded in 1996, the National Football League was the first football league of India to be organised on a national scale, in an aim to develop the sport & give platform for Indian footballers in a club league. However, due to several problems the league was defunct to make way for a new professional I-League.

==== I-League (2007–2022) ====
After the end of 2006–07 season, AIFF disbanded the NFL after allegedly missing the full aim of professionalism. To replace NFL, AIFF introduced a fully professional I-League, with ten clubs from the last season of NFL participating in the maiden season of I-League. The league was declared as joint top tier in 2019–20 season when AFC approved AIFF's proposal to demote the AFC Champions League slot, for the AFC Cup. Three seasons later the league was completely demoted to second tier status in Indian football, with the league champions now promoted to the Indian Super League.

==== Indian Super League (2017–present) ====
The I-League suffered from lack of popularity due to poor marketing as the seasons passed by. The deal between the Zee Sports and the AIFF, which was initially signed for a ten-year term in 2006, was terminated in 2010 after disagreement between both the parties. AIFF then signed a new 700-crore deal with Reliance Industries and the International Management Group on 9 December 2010. The Indian Super League was officially launched on 21 October 2013 by IMG–Reliance, Star Sports, and the All India Football Federation with an aim of growing the sport of football in India and increasing its exposure in the country, this time with the big names and high professionalism.

In 2017, The AFC were against allowing the ISL as the main league in India, while I-League clubs East Bengal and Mohun Bagan wanted a complete merger of the ISL and I-League. A couple of weeks later, the AIFF proposed that both the Indian Super League and I-League should run simultaneously on a short–term basis, with the I-League winner qualifying for the AFC Champions League and the ISL champion to AFC Cup qualification stage. The proposal from the AIFF was officially approved by the AFC on 25 July 2017.

Two seasons later the AIFF and AFC announced in a meeting that the Indian Super League was officially the top-tier league of India with the AFC Champions League slot, while the I-League was with the AFC Cup slot. The first recommendation was to open a pathway for two I-League clubs to enter into the ISL by the end of the 2020–21 season, subject to the criteria being fulfilled. The second recommendation was allowing the winner of the I-League to stand a chance of getting promoted to the ISL with no participation fee, starting with the 2022–23 season. In its final recommendation it was agreed that the introduction of promotion and relegation into the top league would be implemented by the end of 2024–25 season, thus making ISL the top tier & I-League officially being 2nd tier competition.

=== Tier II ===
==== NFL Second Division (1997–2007) ====
The NFL's second division was introduced by AIFF in 1997 to supplement the top division. After the 2006–07 season, all the three tiers of NFL were defunct and replaced with I-League and I-League 2nd Division respectively.

==== I-League 2nd Division (2007–2022) ====
The National Football League's second division was succeeded by the I-League 2nd Division in 2008. The state FAs nominated top teams from their respective state leagues to AIFF who then selected the clubs based on criteria. The number of clubs in this league varied each season. Since 2017–18 season, the league saw introduction of the I-League reserve sides which weren't eligible for promotion. After the I-League lost its top tier status, the I-League 2nd Division was demoted, re-establishing India's third tier since the NFL's Third Division in 2006.

==== I-League (2022–2025) ====
Starting from the 2022–23 season, I-League lost its top-tier status. The champions of the 2022–23 I-League were promoted to the ISL with no participation fee. In its recommendation for 2024–25, it was agreed to fully implement promotion and relegation between the two leagues.

==== Indian Football League (2026–present) ====
In 2026, I-League was rebranded as Indian Football League with the participating clubs becoming the league organisers.

=== Tier III ===
==== NFL Third Division (2006) ====
Ten years after the formation of NFL, a third division was briefly introduced for one season in 2006 The NFL Third Division was the first third division tier football league in India to be organized on a national scale. The league was played from 25 November till 18 December 2006 as a promotional tournament for Indian National Football League Second Division. Five teams were promoted to the second division. Starting from the 2022–23 season, I-League 2 filled the void in the third tier left by NFL Third Division in 2006.

==== I-League 2 (2022–present) ====
After demoting I-League to the second tier status in Indian football, its second division i.e., I-League 2nd Division was subsequently demoted to third tier. AIFF renamed the 2nd Division to I-League 2 to avoid disambiguation.

=== Tier IV ===
==== I-League 3 (2023–present) ====
I-League 3 is set to serve as a platform for state champions and nominated teams. It forms the fourth tier of the Indian football league system, between the I-League 2 and the state leagues. No ISL reserve teams are part of it.

=== Tier V & below ===
==== Indian state leagues ====
There are currently total of 36 state associations (including union territories) affiliated with the AIFF. These state associations have state leagues concurrently running. The top teams of state leagues are eligible for the I-League 3 (national 4th tier). Most state leagues have multiple divisions and a promotion/relegation system between these divisions. Calcutta Football League (Oldest football league in Asia) in West Bengal is the oldest state league and has the highest number of divisions with promotion/relegation system in place.

=== System evolution ===
Men's
Level		Years																
Level		1888–1893		1898–1941		1941–1977	1977–1996	1996–1997	1997–2001	2001–2006	2006–2007	2007–2011	2011–2014	2014–2017	2017–2022	2022–2023	2023–2026	2026–present
Level			1893		1937	1941–1977	1977–1996	1996–1997	1997–2001	2001–2006	2006–2007	2007–2011	2011–2014	2014–2017	2017–2022	2022–2023	2023–2026	2026–present
National leagues	1	None	Formation of Indian Football Association (IFA)	State Leagues		Santosh Trophy		National Football League				I-League			Indian Super League	Indian Super League		
National leagues	1	None	Formation of Indian Football Association (IFA)	State Leagues		Santosh Trophy		National Football League				I-League			I-League	Indian Super League		
National leagues	2	None	Formation of Indian Football Association (IFA)	None	Formation of All India Football Federation (AIFF)	None			NFL Second Division			I-League 2nd Division				I-League		Indian Football League
National leagues	3	None	Formation of Indian Football Association (IFA)	None	Formation of All India Football Federation (AIFF)	None					NFL Third Division	Discontinued				I-League 2		
National leagues	4	None	Formation of Indian Football Association (IFA)	None	Formation of All India Football Federation (AIFF)	None											I-League 3	
Regional leagues	5–11	None	Formation of Indian Football Association (IFA)	None	Formation of All India Football Federation (AIFF)	State Leagues												
Cup competitions		Durand Cup																
Cup competitions							Federation Cup								AIFF Super Cup			
Cup competitions								Indian Super Cup					Discontinued					

== Women's ==
The women's football league system in India currently consists of top tier national league i.e. Indian Women's League, organized by the All India Football Federation (AIFF). From 2023 to 24 IWL 2 will form the tier 2, and top 2 clubs will be promoted to IWL. Tier 3 are the State football leagues, organized by regional state associations under AIFF affiliation, in the league tier pyramid of women's football in India.

=== Pyramid ===
Level	National leagues																											
1	Indian Women's League; 8 clubs – ↓ 2 relegations																											
2	Indian Women's League 2; 15 clubs – 2 promotions ↑↓ 9 relegations																											
	State leagues																											
	State level	Karnataka	Maharastra			West Bengal	Delhi	Meghalaya	Tamil Nadu	Assam	Goa	Manipur	Odisha	Jharkhand	Punjab	Sikkim	Mizoram	Arunachal Pradesh	Bihar	Chhattisgarh	Gujarat	Haryana	Himachal Pradesh	Kerala	Madhya Pradesh	Puducherry	Tripura	Ladakh
3	1	Karnataka Women's Super Division ↑promote ↓relegate	Maharashtra State Senior Women's Football League ↑promote			CWFL Premier Division A ↑promote 1 ↓relegate 2	Delhi Women's Premier League ↑promote ↓relegate	Meghalaya Women's State League ↑promote	Tamil Nadu Women's League ↑promote	Assam Women's League ↑promote	Goa Women's League ↑promote	Manipur Women's League ↑promote	Odisha Women's League ↑promote	JSA Women's League ↑promote	Punjab Women's League ↑promote	Sikkim Women's Football League ↑promote	Mizoram Women's League ↑promote	Arunachal Women's League ↑promote	Bihar State Women's League ↑promote	Chhattisgarh State Women's Football League ↑promote	Gujarat State Women's League ↑promote	Haryana Women's Football League ↑promote	Himachal Women's League ↑promote	Kerala Women's League ↑promote	Madhya Pradesh Women's Premier League ↑promote	Pondicherry Women's League ↑promote	Tripura Women's Football League ↑promote	Ladakh Women's Football Premier League ↑promote
4	2	Karnataka Women's A Division	MFA Women's Premier League	PDFA Women's League	Kolhapur Women's League	CWFL Premier Division B ↑promote 2	Delhi Women's Championship	SSA Women's Football League	1 division																			
5	3	Karnataka Women's B Division	MFA Women's Super League	2 divisions					1 division																			

=== Status evolution ===
Professional leagues
Amateur/Semi-professional leagues

Year	Tier 1	Tier 2	Tier 3 & below
1993–2016	State leagues		
2016–2023	Indian Women's League	State leagues (without top divisions)	
2023–present	Indian Women's League	Indian Women's League 2	State leagues (without top divisions)

=== Tier I ===
==== Indian Women's League (2016–present) ====
In 2014, after the success of the India women's team, mainly in the SAFF Women's Championship, a push to start a women's football league, along the lines of recently inaugurated and successful Indian Super League, happened. Clubs such as Pune and Bengaluru expressed interests in joining a national women's league. It was around this time that AIFF started plans to create a league for women along the lines of ISL.

On 21 April 2016, the AIFF president Praful Patel said that Indian Women's League would kick-off in October with six teams to be decided, and goal to expand to eight teams by 2017. Over two months later, on 5 July, AIFF organized a workshop to discuss the India women's national team and proposed women's football league. Five Indian Super League sides – Delhi Dynamos, Chennaiyin, Kerala Blasters, Pune City and Atletico de Kolkata, and three I-League sides – Bengaluru, Aizawl and Mumbai, attended the workshop. It was announced that the league would feature eight teams and two other spots would be determined through a preliminary round. The primary objective of the tournament was to capitalise the potential of Indian women and prepare them for the national team, so as to eventually qualify for AFC Women's Asian Cup and FIFA Women's World Cup.

=== Tier II ===
==== Indian Women's League 2 (2023–present) ====
The league was launched by All India Football Federation as India's first national women's second tier professional football league. In January 2024, the League Committee confirmed the introduction of the system of promotion and relegation of the clubs involving the IWL and IWL 2, effective from the 2024–25 season.

=== Tier III & below ===
==== Indian state leagues ====
There are currently total of 36 state associations (including union territories) affiliated with the AIFF. These state associations have state leagues concurrently running. The top teams of state leagues are eligible for the Indian Women's League 2 (national 2nd tier). Some of the state leagues have multiple divisions and a promotion/relegation system between these divisions. Calcutta Women's Football League (Oldest football league in India) in West Bengal is the oldest state league. Karnataka Women's League has the highest number of divisions with promotion/relegation system in place.

=== System evolution ===
Women's
Level		Years			
Level		1937	1991–2016	2016–2023	2023-present
National leagues	1	Formation of All India Football Federation (AIFF)	Senior Women's National Football Championship	Indian Women's League	
National leagues	2	Formation of All India Football Federation (AIFF)	None		Indian Women's League 2
Regional leagues	3–	Formation of All India Football Federation (AIFF)	State Leagues		

== Youth ==
=== Current Youth League system ===
Level	Competition	Age category
National	Reliance Foundation Development League	Under-21
National	Youth League	Under-17
National	Junior League	Under-15
National	Sub-Junior League	Under-13
National	Subroto Cup	Inter-school

== National Football Championships ==
The National Football Championships are competitions contested among the regional state associations and government institutions under the All India Football Federation. Currently, six championship competitions are divided into age groups for both men and women.

=== Senior NFC (Santosh Trophy) ===
The Santosh Trophy is a men's football competition contested by the regional state associations and government institutions under the AIFF. Before starting the National Football League in 1996, the Santosh Trophy was considered the top domestic championship in India.

=== Senior Women's NFC (Rajmata Jijabai Trophy) ===
Senior Women's National Football Championship for Rajmata Jijabai Trophy is the women's football tournament which is contested among the regional state, territory federations and government institutions of India. It began to play in 1991. The league consisted of 30 teams for the 2019–20 season.

=== U-20, Junior & Sub Junior Boys' NFC ===
The U-20 National Football Championship or Swami Vivekananda U20 National Football Championship is a national level inter-state championship for boys under the age of 20. All affiliated State Units of AIFF are eligible to participate in this championship.

The Junior Boys' National Football Championship or BC Roy Trophy is for the Junior age groups, which was started in 1962. All affiliated State Units of AIFF are eligible to participate in this championship through the two tiers of the competition played across the country.

The Sub Junior Boys' National Football Championship or Mir Iqbal Hussain Trophy is a national level inter-state championship for boys under the age of 16, which was started in 1977. All affiliated State Units of AIFF can participate in this championship through the qualifying round.

=== Junior & Sub Junior Girls' NFC ===
The U-19 Junior Girls' National Football Championship or Dr. Talimeren Ao Trophy was first introduced in 2001.

The U-17 Sub-Junior Girls' National Football Championship was first introduced in 2003 and held at Ooty.

== See also ==
- Futsal Club Championship
- National Beach Soccer Championship
- List of football clubs in India
- History of football in India
