= Mizoram Football Association =

State governing body of Football in Mizoram

- Sport: Football
- Jurisdiction: Mizoram
- Membership: 11 district association
- Abbreviation: MFA
- Founded: 1973; 53 years ago
- Affiliation: All India Football Federation (AIFF)
- Headquarters: Aizawl
- President: Lalnghinglova Hmar
- Secretary: Lalrengpuia

Mizoram Football Association (MFA) is the governing body of football in the state of Mizoram, India. It is affiliated with the All India Football Federation, the national governing body. Mizoram football enthusiasts started Aizawl Sport Association in 1945. After 1972, the name was changed to Mizoram Sports Association. In 1973 under the guidance of Shri Lal Thanhawla, football started as a separate unit and took the name Mizoram Football Association. MFA was registered under society act in the year of 1980. MFA covers 11 regional districts. It sends state teams for Santosh Trophy and Rajmata Jijabai Trophy.

In 2012, led by Tetea Hmar as honorary secretary, who was also executive member of the All India Football Federation (AIFF), the association made a national success when it established the first domestic league, called the Mizoram Premier League (MPL), in India in 2012. MFA had no fund on its own or sponsor for the MPL, Hmar persuaded the local TV provider Zonet to join in the management. Zonet agreed a five-year deal as the sponsor with INR 2.5 million each year. The success of the league led to Mizoram football team winning the Santosh Trophy for the first time in 2014. In 2015, Mizoram lifted the coveted National Games Gold Medal in Men's Football.

== State teams ==
=== Men ===
- Mizoram football team
- Mizoram under-20 football team
- Mizoram under-15 football team
- Mizoram under-13 football team

=== Women ===
- Mizoram women's football team
- Mizoram women's under-15 football team
- Mizoram women's under-13 football team

== Competitions ==
MFA conducts the following tournaments:

=== Club level ===
==== Men's ====
- Mizoram Premier League
- Independence Day Cup
- MFA Super Cup
- MFA Cup

==== Women's ====
- Mizoram Women's League

==== Youth ====
- MFA Youth leagues

==== Futsal ====
- MFA Futsal League
- MFA Futsal Cup

== Mizoram Football League pyramid ==
Tier	Division
I _{(5 on Indian football pyramid)}	Mizoram Premier League _{↑promote (I-League 3) ↓relegate}
II _{(6 on Indian football pyramid)}	Mizoram First Division _{↑promote}

== MFA Independence Day Football 2026 ==
The Mizoram Football Association Independence Day Football Tournament 2026 kicked off on July 27, 2026, at RG Stadium, featuring 12 competing teams. In the opening match, Dinthar FC defeated Chanmari FC 3–1, with Lalbiakzuala winning Player of the Match. Matches are broadcast live via Zonet.

== See also ==
- List of Indian state football associations
- Football in India
- North East Premier League (India)
