= Shaji Prabhakaran =

Indian sports administrator

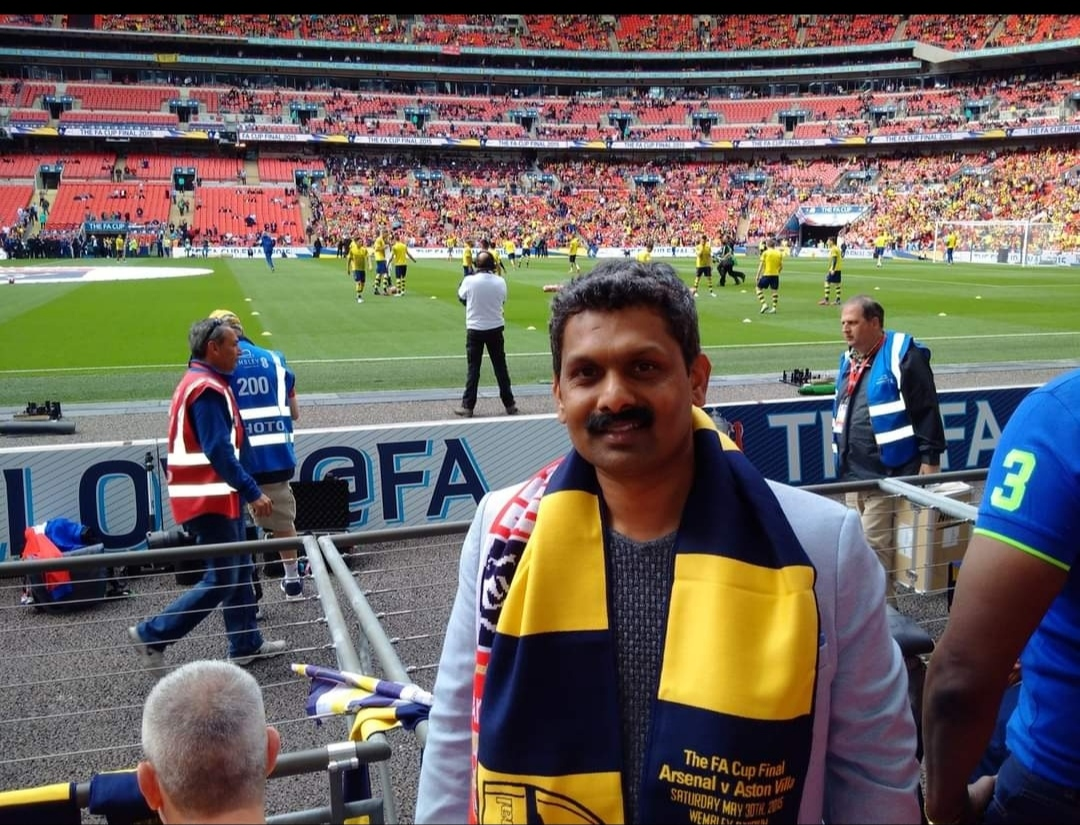
- Prabhakaran pitchside at the 2015 FA Cup final
- Born: 3 May 1972 (age 54); Mavelikara, Kerala, India
- Education: Lakshmibai National Institute of Physical Education (P.Ed, Ph.D)
- Occupations: Former football Consultant (FIFA, AFC)

13th General Secretary of All India Football Federation
- In office 2 September 2022 – 8 November 2023
- Preceded by: Sunando Dhar (interim)
- Succeeded by: Satyanarayan M (acting)

President of Delhi Soccer Association (Football Delhi)
- In office 20 November 2017 – 26 March 2023
- Preceded by: Subhash Chopra
- Succeeded by: Anuj Gupta

Shaji Prabhakaran is an Indian football administrator. He formerly served as the general secretary of the All India Football Federation (AIFF). He was also the president of Delhi Soccer Association (Football Delhi). Prabhakaran is the former FIFA South Central Asia development officer.

== Biography ==
Shaji hails from Kerala. He began playing football at the age of 8, but did not have the opportunity to receive professional training or coaching. As football was not popular in his school at the time he played volleyball and cricket.

At the age of 15, he started playing for a local teagarden club (Binnaguri) in the Dooars area of West Bengal. From that point football then became an integral part of Shaji's life.

Shaji Prabhakaran graduated from Lakshmibai National Institute of Physical Education (LNIPE), Gwalior in 1994. In 2000 he returned to LNIPE and completed his Doctorate (Ph.D.) in Physical Education (football). Currently, he is in the Asian Football Confederation as the elected Executive Committee member since May 2023 and he is also the South Asian Football Federation Executive Committee member. He was appointed as the president of the Football Delhi (Note: It was Delhi Soccer Association earlier, and renamed to its new name Football Delhi in December 2017.) on 19 November 2017. He is also the director of Delhi United SC.

He started his career as a Senior Consultant at the Asian Football Confederation in 2017 following his long association with AIFF as Director of Vision & National Teams. Subsequently, Shaji got elected as the Delhi Soccer Association President, now known as Football Delhi.

In April, 2017 he got appointed as the President and then as Director of the Delhi-based professional I-League level club, Delhi United FC, which competes in the 2nd division.

He was the manager and coach at the CFA (Chandigarh Football Academy) for four years.

He is associated with Mumbai-based sports company, SE TransStadia Pvt Ltd as General Manager and then as Associate Vice President. Shaji is also the founder of football Khelo Foundation.

== Literary works ==
Prabhakaran has authored the book Back to the Roots: A Definitive Guide to Grassroots & Football Development.
