= Punjab Football Association (India) =

State governing body of Football in Punjab

- Sport: Football
- Jurisdiction: Punjab
- Membership: 23 district association
- Abbreviation: PFA
- Founded: 1948; 78 years ago (as East Punjab Football Association)
- Affiliation: All India Football Federation (AIFF)
- Headquarters: Phagwara
- President: Suryajit Singh
- Secretary: Manmohan Singh; Pradeep Kumar

Official website
- punjab.football

The Punjab Football Association (PFA), is the state-level football governing body for Punjab, India. It is affiliated with the All India Football Federation, the sports national governing body. It sends state teams for Santosh Trophy and Rajmata Jijabai Trophy.

== History ==
During the British Raj, football in the Punjab and surrounding regions was governed by the North-West India Football Association since 1932.

After partition, the East Punjab Football Association came into existence on 24 February 1948. The East Punjab Football Association was soon replaced by Punjab Football Association, again affiliated to the All India Football Federation on 24 April 1951.

== State teams ==
=== Men ===
- Punjab football team
- Punjab under-20 football team
- Punjab under-15 football team
- Punjab under-13 football team

=== Women ===
- Punjab women's football team
- Punjab women's under-19 football team
- Punjab women's under-17 football team

== Affiliated district associations ==
All 23 districts of Punjab are affiliated with the Punjab Football Association.

No.	Association	District	President
1	Amritsar District Football Association	Amritsar	
2	Barnala District Football Association	Barnala	
3	Bathinda district Football Association	Bathinda	
4	Faridkot district Football Association	Faridkot	
5	Fatehgarh Sahib district Football Association	Fatehgarh Sahib	
6	Firozpur district Football Association	Firozpur	
7	Fazilka district Football Association	Fazilka	
8	Gurdaspur district Football Association	Gurdaspur	
9	Hoshiarpur district Football Association	Hoshiarpur	
10	Jalandhar district Football Association	Jalandhar	
11	Kapurthala district Football Association	Kapurthala	
12	Ludhiana district Football Association	Ludhiana	
13	Malerkotla district Football Association	Malerkotla	
14	Mansa district Football Association	Mansa	
15	Moga district Football Association	Moga	
16	Sri Muktsar Sahib district Football Association	Sri Muktsar Sahib	
17	Pathankot district Football Association	Pathankot	
18	Patiala district Football Association	Patiala	
19	Rupnagar district Football Association	Rupnagar	
20	Mohali district Football Association	Mohali	
21	Sangrur district Football Association	Sangrur	
22	Shaheed Bhagat Singh Nagar district Football Association	Shaheed Bhagat Singh Nagar	
23	Tarn Taran district Football Association	Tarn Taran	

== Competitions ==
=== Men's ===
- Punjab State Super League
- Punjab State League Second Division
- Punjab State League Third Division

=== Women's ===
- Punjab Women's League

== Punjab Football League pyramid ==
Tier	Division
I _{(Level 5 on Indian Football pyramid)}	Punjab State Super League _{↑promote (I-League 3) ↓relegate}
II _{(Level 6 on Indian Football pyramid)}	Punjab State League Second Division _{↑promote ↓relegate}
III _{(Level 7 on Indian Football pyramid)}	Punjab State League Third Division _{↑promote}

== See also ==
- List of Indian state football associations
- Football in India
