= 2016 Uttarakhand Super League =

Uttarakhand Super League
- Season: 2016
- Champions: Pauri Platoons
- Top goalscorer: (India) Chepko (12 goals)

The 2016 Uttarakhand Super League season (known as the 2016 JSW Uttarakhand Super League for sponsorship reasons) was the first season of the Uttarakhand Super League football competition since its foundation earlier in the year. The season featured fourteen teams and kicked off on 10 July 2016.

Pauri Platoons emerged as the first champions after defeating Nainital FC Lakes in the final on 9 August.

The 25,000-capacity BHEL Stadium in Ranipur is the largest venue by capacity used for Uttarakhand Super League matches.

== Teams ==
Group A	Location	Group B	Location
Chamoli Bugyal FC	Chamoli	Almora Burans	Almora
Dehradun Capital Rangers	Dehradun	Bageshwar FC Kafals	Bageshwar
Haridwar Ganges	Haridwar	Champawat Hills	Champawat
Pauri Platoons	Pauri	Corbett Tigers	Rudrapur
Rudraprayag Monals	Rudraprayag	Nainital FC Lakes	Nainital
Tehri Lions	Tehri	Pithoragarh Panthers	Pithoragarh
Uttarkashi Glaciers	Uttarkashi	Udhamsingh Nagar Warriors	Kashipur

== First round ==
=== Group A ===
Pos	Team	Pld	W	D	L	GF	GA	GD	Pts
1	Dehradun Capital Rangers	6	4	2	0	-	-	—	14
2	Uttarkashi Glaciers	6	3	3	0	-	-	—	12
3	Haridwar Ganges	6	3	1	2	-	-	—	10
4	Pauri Platoons	6	2	1	3	-	-	—	7
5	Rudraprayag Monals	6	1	4	1	-	-	—	7
6	Tehri Lions	6	1	1	4	-	-	—	4
7	Chamoli Bugyal FC	6	1	0	5	-	-	—	3

Updated to match(es) played on 9 August 2016. Source: Uttarakhand Super League standings
Rules for classification: 1) points; 2) goal difference; 3) number of goals scored.

=== Group B ===
Pos	Team	Pld	W	D	L	GF	GA	GD	Pts
1	Pithoragarh Panthers	6	5	0	1	-	-	—	15
2	Bageshwar FC Kafals	6	4	1	1	-	-	—	13
3	Corbett Tigers	6	3	1	2	-	-	—	10
4	Nainital FC Lakes	6	3	1	2	-	-	—	10
5	Champawat Hills	6	1	2	3	-	-	—	5
6	Almora Burans	6	1	1	4	-	-	—	4
7	Udhamsingh Nagar Warriors	6	0	0	6	-	-	—	0

Updated to match(es) played on 9 August 2016. Source: Uttarakhand Super League standings
Rules for classification: 1) points; 2) goal difference; 3) number of goals scored.

== Second round ==
=== Group A ===
Pos	Team	Pld	W	D	L	GF	GA	GD	Pts
1	Dehradun Capital Rangers	3	3	0	0	-	-	—	9
2	Nainital FC Lakes	3	2	0	1	-	-	—	6
3	Uttarkashi Glaciers	3	0	1	2	-	-	—	1
4	Corbett Tigers	3	0	1	2	-	-	—	1

Updated to match(es) played on 9 August 2016. Source: Uttarakhand Super League standings
Rules for classification: 1) points; 2) goal difference; 3) number of goals scored.

=== Group B ===
Pos	Team	Pld	W	D	L	GF	GA	GD	Pts
1	Pithoragarh Panthers	3	3	0	0	-	-	—	9
2	Pauri Platoons	3	2	0	1	-	-	—	6
3	Bageshwar FC Kafals	3	1	0	2	-	-	—	3
4	Haridwar Ganges	3	0	0	3	-	-	—	0

Updated to match(es) played on 9 August 2016. Source: Uttarakhand Super League standings
Rules for classification: 1) points; 2) goal difference; 3) number of goals scored.

== Finals ==
=== Semi-finals ===
6 August	Dehradun Capital Rangers	0–1	Pauri Platoons	Pavelion Ground, Dehradun
12:30 IST		Report

6 August	Pithoragarh Panthers	0–1	Nainital FC Lakes	Pavelion Ground, Dehradun
15:00 IST		Report

=== Third-place match ===
8 August	Pithoragarh Panthers	1–1 (4–5 p)	Dehradun Capital Rangers	Pavelion Ground, Dehradun
15:00 IST		Report

=== Final ===
9 August	Pauri Platoons	2–2 (3–2 p)	Nainital FC Lakes	Pavelion Ground, Dehradun
15:00 IST	S. Singh 45'; M. Singh 86'	Report	Nnanmdi 6'; Tenzin 9'

== End-of-season awards ==
Award	Player	Club
Golden Boot	(India) Chepko	Pithoragarh Panthers
Best forward	(India) Bala Hussain	Dehradun Capital Rangers

== See also ==
- Uttarakhand State Football Association
