= Swami Vivekananda Stadium =

Multi-purpose stadium in Agartala, Tripura, India

- Vivekananda Maidan
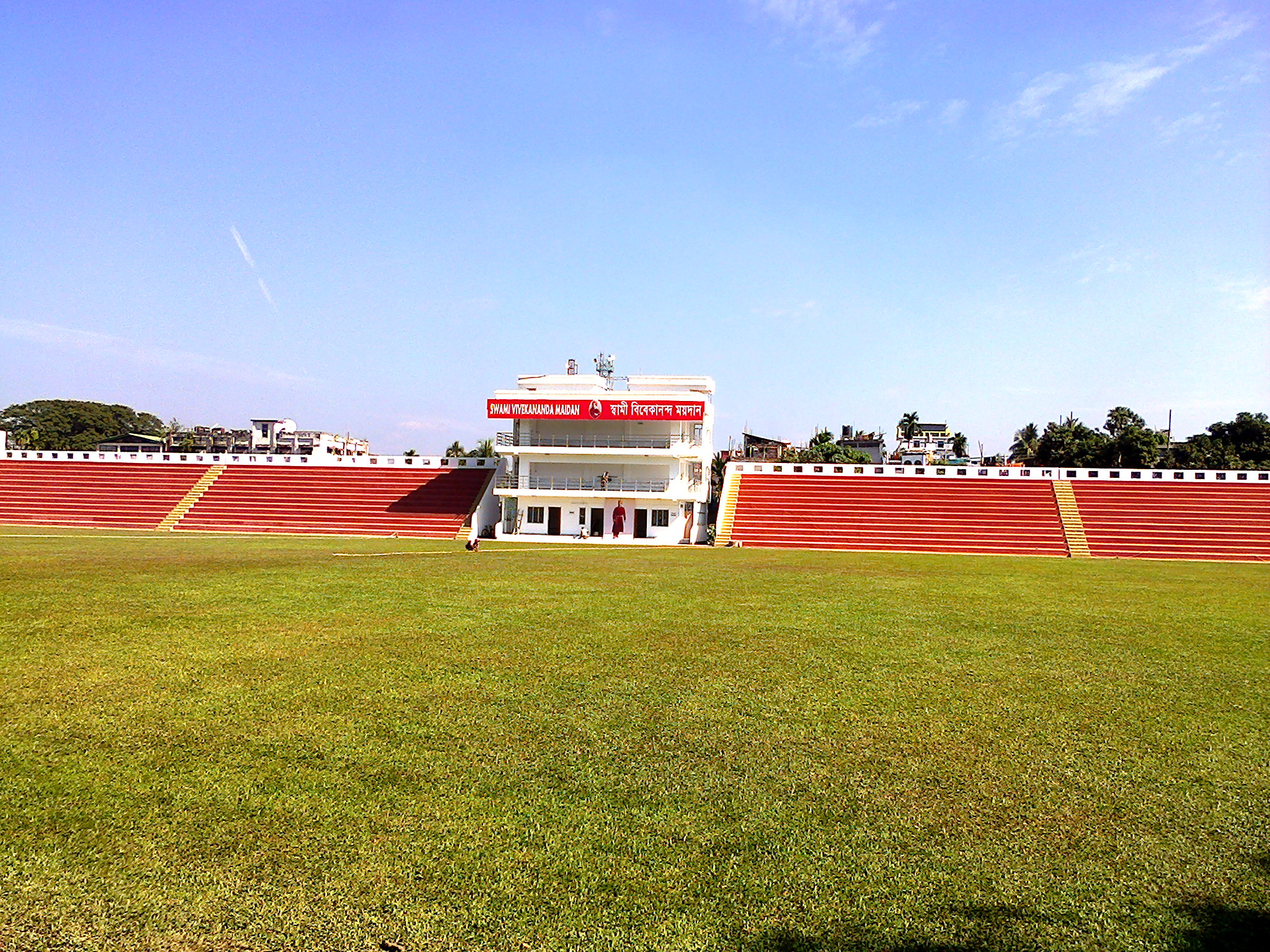
- Interactive map of Swami Vivekananda Stadium
- Full name: Swami Vivekananda Stadium
- Location: Agartala, Tripura, India
- Coordinates: 23°49′41″N 91°17′49″E
- Owner: Government of Tripura
- Capacity: 8,000

Construction
- Built: 2013

Tenants
- Tripura cricket team Tripura football team Forward Club Agartala; Chandra Memorial League

Swami Vivekananda Stadium is a multi-purpose stadium in the capital city of Tripura in Agartala. The ground has capacity of 8,000 persons. The ground is located 2 km from the city center.

Indian Prime Minister Narendra Modi also hosted rally during 2014 prime ministerial campaign.

Its one of the main stadiums in Tripura, with Maharaja Bir Bikram College Stadium and Dasarath Deb Sports Complex, Badharghat.
