= Uttarakhand Super League =

Indian association football league in Uttarakhand

- Organising body: Uttarakhand State Football Association
- Founded: 2016; 10 years ago
- Country: India
- Number of clubs: 14
- Level on pyramid: 5
- Promotion to: I-League 3

The Uttarakhand Super League (USL) is a top state-level football league sanctioned by both the All India Football Federation and Uttarakhand State Football Association, that represents the sport in the state of Uttarakhand. The league is organized by the Uttarakhand Adventure Sports Pvt. Ltd. with the goal of promoting football throughout the state. The league began in July 2016 with fourteen teams playing the inaugural season.

== History ==
In early March 2016 it was announced that Uttarakhand Adventure Sports Pvt Limited, with permission from the All India Football Federation and the Uttarakhand State Football Association, would launch a franchise-based football league based on the Indian Super League. Virendra Singh Rawat was announced as the first technical director of the league while former India international Baichung Bhutia was announced as the brand ambassador for the league. According to Rawat, the league would help footballers from Uttarakhand develop: "Uttarakhand footballers will be biggest beneficiary of the USL as they will get chance to play with foreign football players. The sport will be promoted in a professional manner and each player playing in the tournament will be paid money".

In June 2016 it was announced that the fourteen teams were finalized for the league, as well as the squads for the teams after a bidding process. The first edition of the USL would kick off from 10 July 2016.

After the first season, Pauri Platoons emerged as the inaugural winners, defeating Nainital Lakes on penalties, 3–2, on 9 August 2016.

== Competition format ==
Fourteen teams are divided in two groups of seven before the top four teams from each group qualify for the finals. The qualified teams will then play until grand final to determine the champion.

== Teams ==
The following teams participated in Uttarakhand Super League:

Club	City
Chamoli Bugyal	Chamoli
Almora Burans	Almora
Dehradun Capital Rangers	Dehradun
Bageshwar Kafals	Bageshwar
Haridwar Ganges	Haridwar
Champawat Hills	Champawat
Pauri Platoons	Pauri
Corbett Tigers	Rudrapur
Rudraprayag Monals	Rudraprayag
Nainital Lakes	Nainital
Tehri Lions	Tehri
Pithoragarh Panthers	Pithoragarh
Uttarkashi Glaciers	Uttarkashi
Udham Singh Nagar Warriors	Kashipur

== Final result(s) ==
Season	Date	Winner	Score	Runners–up	Venue	Golden boot	Semi-finalists
2016	9 August	Pauri Platoons	2–2 (3–2 pen)	Nainital Lakes	Pavilion Ground	(India) Chepko (12)	Dehradun Capital Rangers, Pithoragarh Panthers

== See also ==
- Indira Gandhi International Sports Stadium
- Uttarakhand football team
