= SSA Women's Football League =

- Organising body: Shillong Sports Association (SSA)
- Founded: 2022; 4 years ago
- Country: India
- Number of clubs: 12
- Level on pyramid: 4
- Promotion to: Meghalaya Women's State League
- Current champions: Lumparing SSA (1st title) (2025–26)
- Most championships: Mawlai SC (2 titles)

The SSA Women's Football League is the second-level women's state football league in the Indian state of Meghalaya, below the Meghalaya Women's State League, organised by the Shillong Sports Association (SSA). The league is organised by the Shillong Sports Association (SSA), which is affiliated with the Meghalaya Football Association (MFA), the official football governing body of the state.

The inaugural season was held in 2022 and was won by Mawlai SC.

== Venue ==
The matches are held at the MFA Turf, and sometimes at the Nehru Stadium.

== Clubs ==
The teams participating in the 2024–25 season:

No.	Club
1	Kharang SC
2	Laitkor Rngi SC
3	Lumparing SC
4	Madanrting SC
5	Mawpat SC
6	New Challengers
7	Nongrim Hills SC
8	PFR Football Academy
9	Rangdajied United
10	Smit SC

== Champions ==
Season	Champion	Runners-up	Ref
2022–23	Mawlai SC	Laitkor Rngi SC	
2023–24	Mawlai SC	Laitkor Rngi SC	
2024–25	Laitkor Rngi SC	PFR Academy	
2025–26	Lumparing SSA	Laitkor Rngi SC	
