= Forward Club Agartala =

Indian association football club based in Agartala

- Full name: Forward Club Agartala
- Ground: Swami Vivekananda Stadium
- Capacity: 8,000
- League: Chandra Memorial League
| Home colours | Away colours |

Forward Club Agartala is an Indian professional football club based in Agartala, Tripura. The club competes in the Chandra Memorial A Division League. It became the champion of the 2022 Chandra Memorial League.

== Notable players ==
- Victor Amobi
- Christopher Chizoba

== See also ==
- List of football clubs in India
