= Lalnghinglova Hmar =

Indian politician (born 1977)

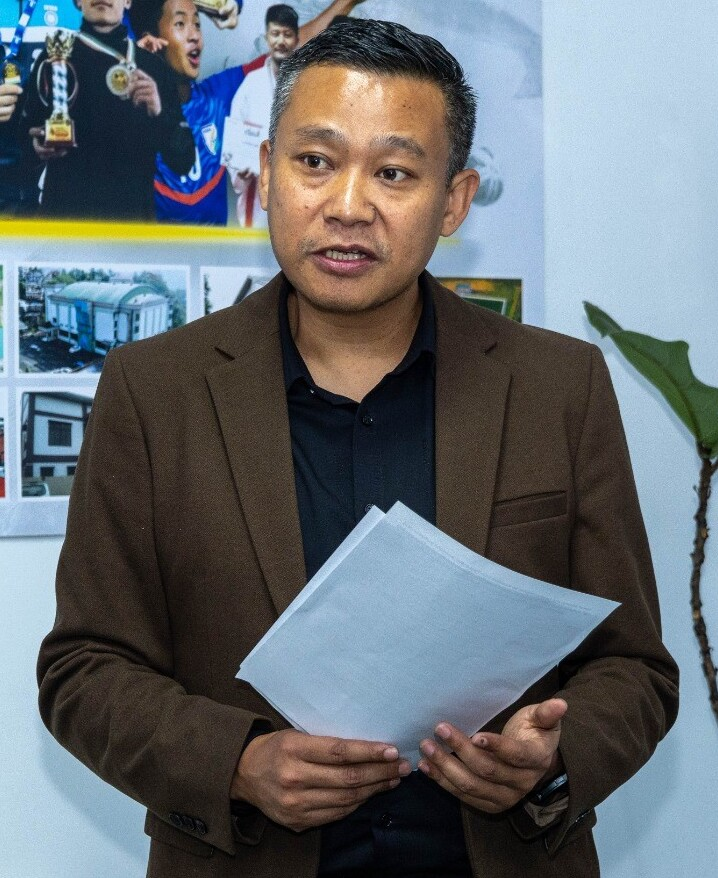
- Lalnghinglova in 2025

Minister of State (Independent Charge) for Labour, Employment, Skill Development and Entrepreneurship
- Incumbent
- Assumed office 8 December 2023
- Chief Minister: Lalduhoma
- Preceded by: Lalchhandama Ralte

Minister of State (Independent Charge) for Sports and Youth Services
- Incumbent
- Assumed office 8 December 2023
- Chief Minister: Lalduhoma
- Preceded by: Robert Romawia Royte

Minister of State (Independent Charge) for Excise and Narcotics
- Incumbent
- Assumed office 8 December 2023
- Chief Minister: Lalduhoma
- Preceded by: Lalrinawma

Member of Mizoram Legislative Assembly
- Incumbent
- Assumed office 8 December 2023
- Preceded by: Lalruatkima
- Constituency: Aizawl West 2

Personal details
- Born: 9 October 1977 (age 48) Aizawl, Mizoram, India
- Party: Zoram People's Movement (since 2017)
- Spouse: Lalsangzeli
- Children: 2 daughters
- Education: M.A. in history
- Alma mater: North Eastern Hill University
- Occupation: Journalism
- Nickname: Tetea Hmar

Lalnghinglova Hmar (popularly known as Tetea Hmar, born on 9 October 1977) is the current Minister of State for Labour, Employment, Skill Development & Entrepreneurship Department, Sport & Youth Services Department and Excise & Narcotics Department. He is also currently the MLA for the Aizawl West 2 Assembly constituency.

Through his journalism and sports activities, he has been credited with revolutionising football in Mizoram. He helped to establish the Mizoram Premier League, for which he is recognised as the father of Mizo football.

Hmar contested the 2019 Lok Sabha election from the Mizoram constituency as an independent candidate but lost to C. Lalrosanga of the Mizo National Front party.

== Early life and education ==
Hmar was born to H. Lalchhuanliana, a Mizoram Police Service officer, and Biakṭhuami. He is the second of four siblings, with two brothers and a sister. He studied at St. Paul's High School and then at Pachhunga University College, both in Aizawl, Mizoram. He completed his bachelor's degree from St. Edmund's College, Shillong and earned his master's degree in history from the North Eastern Hill University, Shillong.

== Career ==
After qualifying the University Grants Commission's National Eligibility Test, Hmar taught history at Pachhunga University College for two years. In 2001, he entered journalism and became the joint editor of the daily newspaper Vanglaini and the Revival Evangelical Weekly. He also serves as Joint Secretary of the Mizoram Olympic Association, and member of the Confederation of Indian Industry National Committee on Sports. He is also currently the President of the Mizoram Football Association, executive committee member of the All India Football Federation, and chairman of the AIFF League Committee.

=== Football ===
Hmar was elected as the honorary secretary of Mizoram Football Association uncontested in 2011, a position he continues to hold as of 2022. Hmar had declared that creating professional league was one of his major goals. He played a key role in establishing the Mizoram Premier League, the first regional domestic league within India, in 2012. MFA had no fund on its own or sponsor for the MPL, Hmar persuaded the local TV provider Zonet to join in the management. Zonet agreed to a five-year deal as the sponsor with INR 2.5 million each year. MPL inspired the growth of Aizawl FC, the 2016-17 I-League champion. It was a national success as the Mizoram team under MFA won the national championship Santosh Trophy for the first time in 2014. MFA had produced the highest level licensed coaches including on A-level, three B-level, and 20 C-level within five years of Hmar's leadership. He was elected unopposed as the President of the Mizoram Football Association, during its Annual General Body Meeting at Aizawl on 23 May 2024.

Hmar created an official liaison with FIFA, which supported the All India Football Federation to organise Grassroots Football Project in Mizoram in 2012 for the first time in India. He also arranged with the German Football Federation the same year for football training in Mizoram from German coaches. He was also instrumental in starting the Mizoram Futsal League, the first in India, with live telecast of Matches by Zonet TV.

In April 2023, Hmar was appointed member of the Social Responsibility Committee of the Asian Football Confederation.

==== Role in AIFF ====
Hmar has been an executive committee member of the All India Football Federation since 2012. He also served as Deputy Chairman of the League Committee under AIFF. AIFF had been seen as highly politicised with a majority of the officers elected from the political arena, and the leadership taken up by political influences. As the situation worsened, on 16 August 2022, the FIFA announced that it officially suspended AIFF "due to undue influence from third parties, which constitutes a serious violation of the FIFA Statutes."

Immediately, the Supreme Court of India constituted the Committee of Administrators for AIFF. Led by former judge A.R. Dave, the committee consisted of seven members with Hmar among them. The committee was assigned to review and remake the AIFF constitutions. In response, the FIFA revoked its suspension on 26 August 2022. On 20 September 2022, Hmar was appointed chairman of the AIFF League Committee, and took up the duty from 27 September.

As a first major step under his leadership, Hmar approved the introduction of the Indian Women's League (IWL) in the AIFF League Committee meeting on 27 March 2023. The IWL was scheduled to start from 25 April 2023.

=== Politics ===
At the Indian parliamentary election for the 17th Lok Sabha in 2019, to contest the sole seat from the Mizoram constituency, the Mizoram Pradesh Congress Committee (representative of the Indian National Congress), and the Zoram People's Movement parties formed a coalition to compete against C. Lalrosanga, a candidate of the state-ruling party Mizo National Front. The MPCC and ZPM chose Hmar to be their jointly-supported candidate. Hmar contested as an independent candidate, and he was popularised with the campaign slogan of being the "Mipui Candidate" or the "People's Candidate." Hmar's major objective was to fight against the Citizenship Amendment Act that was introduced by the National Democratic Alliance, which was supported by the MNF. Hmar lost to Lalrosanga by 8140 votes.

== Personal life ==
Hmar is a Christian, and Presbyterian by denomination. He married Lalsangzeli with whom he has two daughters, Zosangi Hmar (born 2013) and Zochhuani Hmar (born 2015).

== See also ==
- Hmar people
- Mizoram Football Association
