= Chhattisgarh Football Association =

State governing body of Football in Chhattisgarh

- Sport: Football
- Jurisdiction: Chhattisgarh
- Membership: 33 district associations
- Abbreviation: CFA
- Founded: 2000
- Affiliation: All India Football Federation (AIFF)
- Headquarters: Bhilai, Durg
- President: Ajay Chandrakar
- Secretary: G. D. Gandhi

The Chhattisgarh Football Association (CFA) is the state governing body of football in Chhattisgarh, India. It is affiliated with the All India Football Federation, the national governing body. It sends state teams for Santosh Trophy and Rajmata Jijabai Trophy.

== State teams ==
=== Men ===
- Chhattisgarh football team
- Chhattisgarh under-20 football team
- Chhattisgarh under-15 football team
- Chhattisgarh under-13 football team

=== Women ===
- Chhattisgarh women's football team
- Chhattisgarh women's under-19 football team
- Chhattisgarh women's under-17 football team

== Affiliated district associations ==
All 33 districts of Chhattisgarh are affiliated with the Chhattisgarh Football Association.

No.	Association	District	President
1	Balod District Football Association	Balod	
2	Baloda Bazar District Football Association	Baloda Bazar	
3	Balrampur District Football Association	Balrampur	
4	Bastar District Football Association	Bastar	
5	Bemetara District Football Association	Bemetara	
6	Bijapur District Football Association	Bijapur	
7	Bilaspur District Football Association	Bilaspur	
8	Dantewada District Football Association	Dantewada	
9	Dhamtari District Football Association	Dhamtari	
10	Durg District Football Association	Durg	
11	Gariaband District Football Association	Gariaband	
12	Gaurela-Pendra-Marwahi District Football Association	Gaurela-Pendra-Marwahi	
13	Janjgir–Champa District Football Association	Janjgir–Champa	
14	Jashpur District Football Association	Jashpur	
15	Kabirdham District Football Association	Kabirdham	
16	Kanker District Football Association	Kanker	
17	Kondagaon District Football Association	Kondagaon	
18	Khairagarh-Chhuikhadan-Gandai District Football Association	Khairagarh-Chhuikhadan-Gandai	
19	Korba District Football Association	Korba	
20	Koriya District Football Association	Koriya	
21	Mahasamund District Football Association	Mahasamund	
22	Manendragarh-Chirmiri-Bharatpur District Football Association	Manendragarh-Chirmiri-Bharatpur	
23	Mohla-Manpur-Ambagarh Chowki District Football Association	Mohla-Manpur-Ambagarh Chowki	
24	Mungeli District Football Association	Mungeli	
25	Narayanpur District Football Association	Narayanpur	
26	Raigarh District Football Association	Raigarh	
27	Raipur District Football Association	Raipur	
28	Rajnandgaon District Football Association	Rajnandgaon	
29	Sarangarh-Bilaigarh District Football Association	Sarangarh-Bilaigarh	
30	Sakti District Football Association	Sakti	
31	Sukma District Football Association	Sukma	
32	Surajpur District Football Association	Surajpur	
33	Surguja District Football Association	Surguja	

== Competitions ==
=== Men's ===
- Chhattisgarh State Men's Football League Championship

=== Women's ===
- Chhattisgarh State Women's Football League

== See also ==
- List of Indian state football associations
- Football in India
