= 2025 National Games of India =

Sporting event

38th National Games of India
- Host city: Dehradun, Haridwar, Shivpuri, New Tehri, Nainital, Haldwani, Rudrapur, and Pithoragarh
- Motto: Sankalp Se Shikhar Tak (Hindi for, Reaching Heights With Resolve)
- Teams: 37
- Athletes: 11,354
- Sport: 35
- Opening: 28 January
- Closing: 14 February
- Opened by: Narendra Modi (Prime Minister of India)
- Closed by: Amit Shah (Home Minister of India)
- Athlete's Oath: Lakshya Sen
- Main venue: Rajiv Gandhi International Cricket Stadium, Dehradun
- Website: 38th National Games

The 2025 National Games of India, also known as the 38th National Games of India and informally as the Uttarakhand 2025, were held in the state of Uttarakhand from 28 January to 14 February. The games were Inaugurated by Prime Minister Narendra Modi along with him, the Governor of Uttarakhand, Lt. Gen. (Retd.) Gurmit Singh, Chief Minister of Uttarakhand, Pushkar Singh Dhami, Union Ministers of State Ajay Tamta, Raksha Khadse were present among other dignitaries at the event. The Event ended on 14 February 2025, Home Minister Amit Shah was the chief guest of the closing ceremony. Apart from Amit Shah, several dignitaries were in attendance, including Union Sports Minister Mansukh Mandaviya, Uttarakhand Chief Minister Pushkar Singh Dhami, Meghalaya Chief Minister Conrad Sangma, Union Minister of State for Road Transport and Highways Ajay Tamta, Uttarakhand Sports Minister Rekha Arya, Nainital MP Ajay Bhatt, and Indian Olympic Association President and MP P. T. Usha.

== Host selection ==
The Indian Olympic Association gave the Uttarakhand Olympic Association hosting rights for the 2025 edition during the closing ceremony of the 2023 National Games of India.

== Organisers ==
- Uttarakhand Olympic Association
- Government of Uttarakhand Department of Sports
- Ministry of Youth Affairs and Sports
- Indian Olympic Association

== Venues ==
Dehradun

- Maharana Pratap Sports Complex
- Pavallion Ground Sports Complex
- FRIMA Golf Course

Haridwar

- Roshnabad Sports Complex

Shivpuri

- Shivpuri Adventure Sports Complex

New Tehri

- Tehri Lake

Nainital

- Nainital Lake
- Raj Bhavan Golf Course

Haldwani

- Haldwani District Sports Complex
- Indira Gandhi Sports Complex

Rudrapur

- Manoj Sarkar Sports Complex

Pithoragarh

- Hari Singh Thapa Sports Complex

== Marketing ==
The official logo of the games and the mascot, Mauli a Himalayan monal, were unveiled in December 2024. The official olympic torch for the game is named Tejaswini.

== Sports ==
38th National Games of India
- Aquatics ()
  - Diving
  - Swimming
  - Water polo
- Archery ()
- Athletics ()
- Badminton ()
- Basketball ()
  - 3x3 basketball
- Boxing ()
- Canoeing ()
- Equestrian ()
- Field hockey ()
- Football ()
- Golf ()
- Gymnastics ()
- Handball ()
- Judo ()
- Kabaddi ()
- Kho kho ()
- Lawn bowls ()
- Netball ()
- Rowing ()
- Rugby union ()
- Sailing ()
- Shooting ()
- Squash ()
- Table tennis ()
- Taekwondo ()
- Tennis ()
- Triathlon ()
- Volleyball ()
- Weightlifting ()
- Wrestling ()
- Wushu ()
- Yogasana

== Participation and events ==
Participation from 11,354 athletes representing various states and union territories. The host state, Uttarakhand, had the highest number of participants with 1,012, followed by Haryana (875), Maharashtra (795), Karnataka (677), and Tamil Nadu (618). The event featured 32 competitive sports and three demonstration events, including traditional disciplines like Kalarippayattu, Mallakhamba, and Rafting. Competitions were held across multiple venues in cities such as Dehradun, Haridwar, Rishikesh, and Pithoragarh, showcasing India's diverse athletic talent and cultural heritage.

== Medal table ==
* Host nation (Host state)

2025 National Games medal table
Rank	State	Gold	Silver	Bronze	Total
1	Services	68	26	27	121
2	Maharashtra	54	71	76	201
3	Haryana	48	47	58	153
4	Madhya Pradesh	34	26	22	82
5	Karnataka	34	18	28	80
6	Tamil Nadu	27	30	35	92
7	Uttarakhand*	24	35	44	103
8	West Bengal	16	13	18	47
9	Punjab	15	20	31	66
10	Delhi	15	18	29	62
11	Manipur	14	16	25	55
12	Odisha	14	15	17	46
13	Uttar Pradesh	13	20	23	56
14	Kerala	13	17	24	54
15	Rajasthan	9	11	23	43
16	Gujarat	8	10	20	38
17	Jharkhand	7	6	12	25
18	Andhra Pradesh	7	1	6	14
19	Jammu and Kashmir	5	6	13	24
20	Andaman and Nicobar Islands	5	3	2	10
21	Chandigarh	4	6	9	19
22	Himachal Pradesh	4	3	8	15
23	Arunachal Pradesh	4	3	6	13
24	Assam	3	15	16	34
25	Chhattisgarh	3	4	9	16
26	Telangana	3	3	12	18
27	Goa	2	4	4	10
28	Mizoram	2	0	1	3
29	Bihar	1	6	5	12
30	Meghalaya	1	2	2	5
31	Puducherry	0	1	1	2
32	Nagaland	0	0	2	2
32	Sikkim	0	0	2	2
Totals (33 entries)		457	456	610	1,523

Preceded by 2023 National Games of India	National Games of India	Succeeded by TBD
