= Meghalaya Football Association =

Association football governing body in Meghalaya

- Sport: Football
- Jurisdiction: Meghalaya
- Membership: 21 district associations
- Abbreviation: MFA
- Founded: 1976; 50 years ago
- Affiliation: All India Football Federation (AIFF)
- Headquarters: Shillong
- President: Larsing Ming Sawyan
- Secretary: S. S. Raptap

Official website
- www.meghalayafootball.com

The Meghalaya Football Association (MFA) is one of the 36 Indian state football associations that are affiliated with the All India Football Federation. The MFA is the football governing body in the state of Meghalaya, India. The Meghalaya football team is also administered by the MFA. It sends state teams for Santosh Trophy and Rajmata Jijabai Trophy.

== State teams ==
=== Men ===
- Meghalaya football team
- Meghalaya under-20 football team
- Meghalaya under-15 football team
- Meghalaya under-13 football team

=== Women ===
- Meghalaya women's football team
- Meghalaya women's under-19 football team
- Meghalaya women's under-17 football team

== Affiliated district associations ==
The district associations affiliated with the Meghalaya Football Association.

No.	Association	District
1	Amlarem Block Sports Association	Amlarem (West Jaintia Hills)
2	Baghmara District Football Association	South Garo Hills
3	East Jaintia District Football Association	Khliehriat (East Jaintia Hills)
4	Eastern Border Sports Association	Mawsynram (East Khasi Hills)
5	Laskein Block Sports Association	Laskein (West Jaintia Hills)
6	Mawkyrwat District Sports Association	Mawkyrwat (South West Khasi Hills)
7	Mawshynrut Sports Association	Mawshynrut (West Khasi Hills)
8	Nongstoin District Sports Association	Nongstoin (West Khasi Hills)
9	North Garo Hills District Sports Association	North Garo Hills
10	Pyndengumiong District Sports Association	Pyndengumiong (West Khasi Hills)
11	Ri-Bhoi District Sports Association	Ri-Bhoi
12	Riwar Mihngi Sports Association	Riwar Mihngi (East Khasi Hills)
13	Saipung Block Sports Association	Saipung (East Jaintia Hills)
14	Shillong Sports Association	Shillong (East Khasi Hills)
15	Sohra Sports Association	Cherrapunji (East Khasi Hills)
16	Thadlaskein Sports Association	Thadlaskein (West Jaintia Hills)
17	Tura District Football Association	West Garo Hills
18	Tyrsad Area Sports Association	Tyrsad (East Khasi Hills)
19	West Jaintia District Sports Association	Jowai (West Jaintia Hills)
20	Western Ri-Bhoi Sports Association	Jirang (Ri-Bhoi)
21	Williamnagar District Sports Association	East Garo Hills

== Competitions ==
=== Men's ===
- Meghalaya State League

=== Women's ===
- Meghalaya Women's State League

== Meghalaya Football League pyramid ==
Tier	Division
I _{(5 on Indian Football pyramid)}	Meghalaya State League _{↑promote (I-League 3) ↓relegate}
II _{(6 on Indian Football pyramid)}	District leagues (Shillong Premier League and others) _{↑promote}

== See also ==
- Football in India
