= Aizawl West 2 Assembly constituency =

Constituency of the Mizoram legislative assembly in India

Coordinates: 23.733°N 92.709°E

Aizawl West 2
- Constituency No. 16 for the Mizoram Legislative Assembly
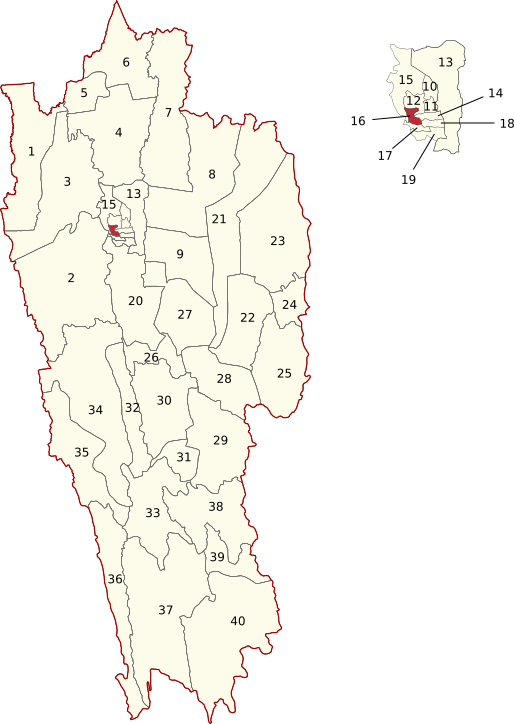

Constituency details
- Country: India
- Region: Northeast India
- State: Mizoram
- District: Aizawl
- Lok Sabha constituency: Mizoram
- Established: 2008
- Total electors: 18,563
- Reservation: ST

Member of Legislative Assembly
- 9th Mizoram Legislative Assembly
- Incumbent Lalnghinglova Hmar
- Party: Zoram People's Movement
- Elected year: 2023

Aizawl West 2 is one of the 40 Legislative Assembly constituencies of Mizoram state in India.

It is part of Aizawl district and is reserved for candidates belonging to the Scheduled Tribes.

== Members of the Legislative Assembly ==
Election	Name	Party
2008	T. Sailo	Mizoram People's Conference
2013	Lalruatkima	Mizo National Front
2018	Lalruatkima	Mizo National Front
2023	Lalnghinglova Hmar	Zoram People's Movement

== Election results ==
=== 2023 ===
2023 Mizoram Legislative Assembly election: Aizawl West 2
Party	Candidate	Votes	%	±%
ZPM	Lalnghinglova Hmar	10,398	58.95	
MNF	Lalruatkima	5,579	31.63	
INC	Dr. Ngurdingliana	1,528	8.66	
Independent	K. Laldingliana	99	0.56	New
NOTA	None of the Above	36	0.2	
Majority		4,819	27.32	
Turnout		17,640	78.08	
ZPM gain from MNF		Swing		

=== 2018 ===
2018 Mizoram Legislative Assembly election: Aizawl West 2
Party	Candidate	Votes	%	±%
MNF	Lalruatkima			
NOTA	None of the Above			
Majority				
Turnout				

== See also ==
- List of constituencies of the Mizoram Legislative Assembly
- Aizawl district
