= IGl Sports Stadium =

Stadium in Haldwani, Uttarakhand, India

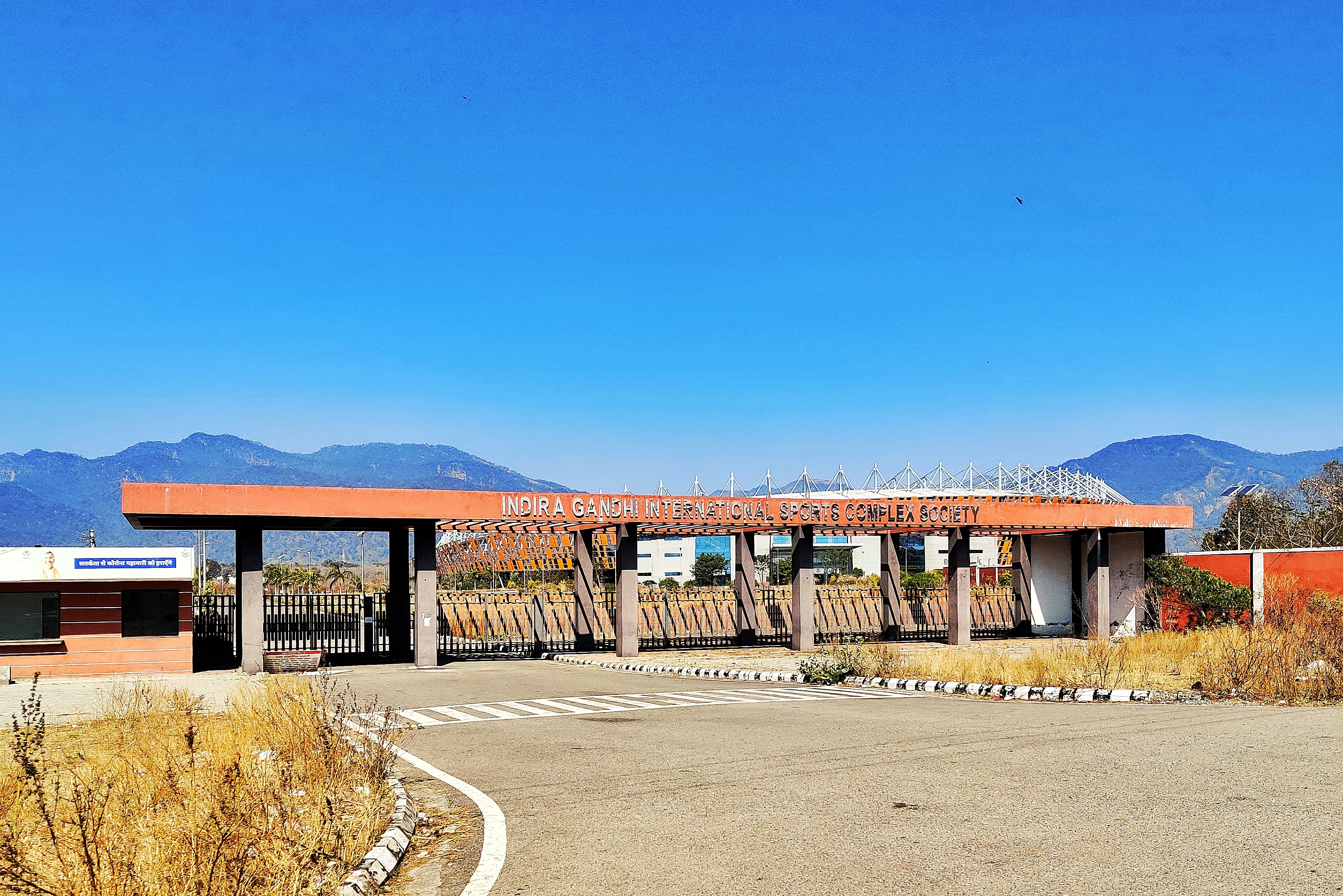
- Entrance gate of the stadium
- Interactive map of IGl Sports Stadium
- Address: Haldwani Bypass Road, Gaulapar; Haldwani; India
- Coordinates: 29.21938°N 79.54297°E
- Owner: Government of Uttarakhand
- Operator: Uttarakhand Olympic Association
- Capacity: 25,000
- Type: Stadium

Tenants
- Uttarakhand football team Uttarakhand Super League

Indira Gandhi International Sports Stadium is multi sports complex located in Haldwani, Uttarakhand, India. The main stadium can seat 25,000 spectators and was inaugurated on 18 December 2016 by Harish Rawat, the then Chief Minister of Uttarakhand. It is spread over 70 acres and has football & cricket grounds, a track for 800-metre race, a hockey field, badminton courts, a lawn tennis court, a boxing ring, and a swimming pool. The stadium was one of the host ground of 38th edition of National games in 2025.

== Location ==
The stadium is located on the banks of the Gaula river in the Gaulapar area of Haldwani. It is about 3 kilometres (1.9 mi) from Haldwani bus station and 2.5 kilometres (1.6 mi) from railway station.

== History ==
On 7 November 2014, the Government of Uttarakhand signed a Memorandum of Understanding (MoU) with the NCC Limited, Hyderabad, to build the stadium in 18 months on 30.20 hectares of land. At that time Rs. 225 crore were allocated to this project. The foundation of Haldwani Stadium was laid on 9 November 2014 by then Chief Minister of Uttarakhand, Harish Rawat. On 18 December 2016, he inaugurated the International Cricket Ground as a part of the stadium complex.

== See also ==
- Doon School Ground
- Rajiv Gandhi International Cricket Stadium, Dehradun
- Maharana Pratap Sports College
