= Uttarakhand State Football Association =

State governing body of Football in Uttarakhand

- Sport: Football
- Jurisdiction: Uttarakhand, India
- Membership: 13 district associations
- Abbreviation: USFA
- Founded: 2004; 22 years ago
- Affiliation: All India Football Federation (AIFF)
- Headquarters: Haldwani, Uttarakhand, India
- President: Subodh Uniyal
- Secretary: Akhtar Ali

The Uttarakhand State Football Association (USFA) is the governing body of football in the Indian state of Uttarakhand. It is affiliated with the All India Football Federation. The USFA sends state teams for the Santosh Trophy and the Rajmata Jijabai Trophy.

== State teams ==
=== Men ===
- Uttarakhand football team
- Uttarakhand under-20 football team
- Uttarakhand under-15 football team
- Uttarakhand under-13 football team

=== Women ===
- Uttarakhand women's football team
- Uttarakhand women's under-19 football team
- Uttarakhand women's under-17 football team

== Affiliated district associations ==
All 13 district of Uttarakhand are affiliated with the Uttarakhand State Football Association.

No.	Association	District	President
1	Almora District Football Association	Almora	
2	Bageshwar District Football Association	Bageshwar	
3	Chamoli District Football Association	Chamoli	
4	Champawat district Football Association	Champawat	
5	Dehradun District Football Association	Dehradun	
6	Haridwar District Football Association	Haridwar	
7	Nainital District Football Association	Nainital	
8	Pauri Garhwal District Football Association	Pauri Garhwal	
9	Pithoragarh District Football Association	Pithoragarh	
10	Rudraprayag District Football Association	Rudraprayag	
11	Tehri Garhwal District Football Association	Tehri Garhwal	
12	Udham Singh Nagar District Football Association	Udham Singh Nagar	
13	Uttarkashi District Football Association	Uttarkashi	

== Competitions ==
=== Men's ===
- Uttarakhand Super League

== Home ground ==
- Indira Gandhi International Sports Stadium

== See also ==
- List of Indian state football associations
- Football in India
- Cricket Association of Uttarakhand
