= Sports in Gujarat =

Sports retain a very valuable position in the culture of Gujarat. Some of the popular sports played in Gujarat are cricket, kho-kho, badminton, football, kabaddi and table tennis. The Sports Authority of Gujarat presides and supervises the sporting activities under the Sports, Youth and Cultural Activities Department. There have been many successful and popular initiatives undertaken by the authority to encourage the sports culture in Gujarat, Khel Mahakumbh' being an example. Gujarat has various levels of sports competitions including events of both larger and smaller levels.

== Important sports events ==
=== Khel Mahakumbh ===
Under the leadership of Shri Narendra Modi, the Prime minister of India - also the former Chief minister of Gujarat - the initiative of ‘Khel Mahakumbh’ (KMK), a mega sporting event was undertaken in the year 2010. Khelo India was initiated nationwide by the Indian Central government keeping Khel Mahakumbh as the base of the initiative.

The event lasts for about a month and each budding talent showcases their skills and hard work. As there are no age limits; people from any age group can participate in it. It commences at the panchayat level and subsequently, moves on to taluka level and district level. Then, winners at this level meet at state level competitions.

Every year a record participation of 3 million participants is observed. Outstanding performers of KMK get benefits of various schemes run by Sports Authority of Gujarat, District Level Sports School (DLSS), Shaktidoot, Centre of Excellence (COE), Khele Gujarat Summer Coaching Camp, In school Program, Khel Pratibha Puraskar, Mahila Puraskar, etc. are also awarded.

There is also Special Khel Mahakumbh for Divyang players (Physically Challenged) in which more than 35,000 players participate with cash prizes more than ₹5 Crore.

==== Age Groups Participating in Khel Mahakumbh ====
Khel Mahakumbh has no restrictions on age bar. The bifurcation of age groups is as follows:

- Under 9 Boys/ Girls
- Under 11 Boys/ Girls
- Under 14 Boys/ Girls
- Under 17 Boys/ Girls
- Above 40 Veterans Men/ Women
- Above 60 Veterans Men/ Women
- Open Age Group

=== Pro Kabaddi League ===
Pro Kabaddi League is an initiative by Mashal Sports Pvt. Ltd and Star India Pvt. Ltd. There have been many innovations since its commencement in 2014, which is a reason for its tremendous growth in popularity. It is backed by Amateur Kabaddi Federation of India, and supported by participating members of the International Kabaddi Federation and the Asian Kabaddi Federation. The League is currently participated in by 12 teams, each split region-wise. Gujarat Fortune Giants represents the state in this league. The Pro Kabaddi League matches are hosted in The EKA Arena by TransStadia in Gujarat.

=== Indian Premier League ===
Gujarat is represented in the Indian Premier League, by its team Gujarat Titans and Gujarat Lions. Cricket matches are often played in Sardar Patel Stadium, and many Indian Premier League matches are hosted there. There's a huge craze for its matches in the people of Gujarat and India.

=== Beach Khel Mahakumbh ===
Beach Khel Mahakumbh refers to the beach-sports fest, a spin off of the Khel Mahakumbh. This fest was held to promote the feasibility of beach-sports and garner new attractions towards the different beaches of Gujarat State. After the event's success and introduction, the Government of Gujarat has strangely not announced any other editions of the fest. The setup of the sports on beaches requires not much efforts, but just a marked area, ball and a goalpost. The fest concluded with a prize distribution ceremony on February 13, 2013, a month later after its commencement. The Sabarmati Riverfront witnessed artificial sandy beach creation to create the same atmosphere as that of a beach and maintain the theme for the final event.

=== Gujarat Premier League ===
Gujarat Premier League is a state and franchise - based T20 cricket tournament. It was hosted for 12 days in 2018 and the matches were played in Surat, Ahmedabad and Rajkot. A total of 18 matches were played between the participating six teams. Each team consisted of one former Indian cricketer, three former International players, three new-cap players and domestic stars. The winning team gets a cash prize of Rs 51 lakh(~$71,000), while the runners-up get cash prize of Rs 21 lakh(~$29,000). Also, each participating team gets Rs 2 lakh(~$2800) in addition to the prize amount.

=== The 6th Asian School Table Tennis Championship ===
The 6th Asian School Table Tennis Championship was held in Vadodara, Gujarat, in August 2019. A total of eight countries including China, Bangladesh, Hong Kong, India, Indonesia, Nepal, Thailand and UAE are participating in the Championship.

=== 2030 Commonwealth Games ===
Ahmedabad, Gujarat, was awarded the hosting rights of the 2030 Commonwealth Games on 26 November 2025. The city was previously awarded the 2029 World Police and Fire Games.

== Cricket ==
The governing body for Cricket in the state is the Gujarat Cricket Association. It is affiliated to BCCI. There are three international standard stadiums in Gujarat - in Ahmedabad, Rajkot and Baroda. There are many other stadiums where domestic level cricket is played. There are many prominent players from Gujarat including Cheteshwar Pujara, Parthiv Patel, Ravindra Jadeja, Irfan Pathan, Yusuf Pathan, Hardik Pandya, Krunal Pandya, Jasprit Bumrah and Axar Patel

== Badminton ==
Badminton as a sports is still developing in Gujarat under its regulating authority, the Gujarat Badminton Association. It is affiliated with the Gujarat Olympic Association and Badminton Association of India. The Association finds talented pool of players and refers them for higher level tournaments by organizing various competitions. Many prominent players in Badminton hail from Gujarat, including Tasnim Mir and Ami Ghia. There are district, state and national level tournaments held in the state.

== Volleyball ==
Volleyball is played extensively in schools and residential colonies. Open Gujarat Volleyball Tournament is a famous event. Prominent players from Gujarat in Volleyball include the Vala Sisters. Gujarat holds many district, state and national level tournaments. to develop this sport.

== Table Tennis ==
The Gujarat State Table Tennis Association is responsible for developing this sport in the state. It is affiliated to governing body of country for this sport. It organizes various competitions to find young talent among the crowd. Some eminent players include Pathik Mehta and Harmeet Desai from Gujarat. In 2019, Harmeet Desai was honored with the Arjuna Award for his outstanding performance in year 2018-2019 as well as his contribution and dedication towards game. Also, Gujarat State Table Tennis Association is coming up with Gujarat Super League Table Tennis.

== Chess ==
Gujarat has produced many grand masters including Tejas Bakre and Ankit Rajpare There are many national level competitions organized in the state by All India Chess Federation for many age groups. One International GM Open was held from 5 October 2018 to 12 October 2018 and the second International GM is scheduled in September 2019.

== See also ==
- Sport in India
