= Satyanarayan M =

Indian journalist, sports administrator

Satyanarayan Muthyalu, also known as Satya, is an Indian sports journalist turned football administrator. He serves as the deputy secretary general of the All India Football Federation.

== Early life and education ==
Sathya completed his LLB at the National Law School of India University in 1988. He started as a sports journalist with Times of India in 1987 and after a year joined Deccan Herald where he was a reporter for two years, both in Bangalore. Later, he moved to Gulf News Abu Dhabi in October 1997, where he was Deputy Editor for over 15 years.

== Career ==
In July 2023, he was appointed as the Deputy Secretary General of AIFF by its executive committee following the Annual General Meeting in Bengaluru chaired by the president Kalyan Chaubey. Earlier in August 2019, he became the general secretary of the Karnataka State Football Association and later became a member of the I-league committee. He is instrumental in developing women's football in the country.
