= Chhattisgarh State Men's Football League Championship =

Top tier men's football league in Chhattisgarh

- Organising body: Chhattisgarh Football Association (CGFA)
- Founded: 2022; 4 years ago
- Country: India
- Number of clubs: 9
- Level on pyramid: 5
- Promotion to: I-League 3
- Current champions: SECR Bilaspur (1st title)
- Most championships: RKM (3 titles)
- Current: 2025

The Chhattisgarh State Men's Football League Championship is the top state-level football league in the Indian state of Chhattisgarh. It is organised by Chhattisgarh Football Association (CGFA).

The inaugural season kicked off on 29 March 2022 with 8 teams competing for the maiden title.

== Format and regulations ==
A total of 9 teams compete in the league. Each team can sign a maximum of 7 players outside the state of Chhattisgarh and can use only 4 other state player in playing Eleven.

== Teams ==
- ATK Champion FC
- Brahmavid Football Academy
- Durg Heroes FC
- New Friends Club, Dantewada
- Rama FC
- Rovers Club
- RKM
- SECR Bilaspur
- Amleshwar fc ( AFC )

== Winners ==
Season	Champions	Runners-up
2022	RKM	
2023	RKM	New Friends Dantewada
2024	RKM	Brahmavid FA
2025	SECR Bilaspur	New Friends Dantewada

== See also ==
- Chhattisgarh Football Association
