= Chandra Memorial League =

Chandra Memorial A Division League
- Organising body: Tripura Football Association
- Country: India
- Confederation: All India Football Federation (AIFF)
- Divisions: 1 (A Division)
- Number of clubs: 8–12 (varies by season)
- Level on pyramid: 5 (Indian football league system)
- Promotion to: I-League 3
- Relegation to: Chandra Memorial B Division League

The Chandra Memorial A Division League is a regional football league in the Indian state of Tripura. It is organised by the Tripura Football Association (TFA), which functions under the All India Football Federation (AIFF).

The league is the highest division within the Tripura state football system and operates a promotion and relegation structure with lower divisions.

== History ==
The Chandra Memorial League system was introduced in the early 2000s to organise football competitions in Tripura in a structured league format. It replaced earlier informal district-level competitions held in and around Agartala.

== Structure ==
The league operates within a three-tier system:

- A Division (top tier)
- B Division (second tier)
- C Division (third tier)

Promotion and relegation occur between divisions depending on seasonal performance.

== Competition format ==
The league follows a round-robin format where all teams play each other.

Points system:

- Win = 3 points
- Draw = 1 point
- Loss = 0 points

The team with the highest points at the end of the season is declared champion.

== Clubs ==
Clubs participating in the league include:

- Ageya Chalo Sangha
- Forward Club Agartala
- Tripura Police FC
- Birendra Club
- Lalbahadur Vyamagar FC
- Nine Bullets FC
- Blood Mouth Club

== Champions ==
Recent champions include:

- 2022–23 – Ageya Chalo Sangha
- 2023–24 – Ageya Chalo Sangha
- 2024–25 – Ageya Chalo Sangha
- 2025–26 – Blood Mouth Club

== Significance ==
The league is part of the state football structure in Tripura and contributes to the development of football at regional level in India. It operates under the Tripura Football Association, which is affiliated with the All India Football Federation.

== See also ==
- Football in India
- Tripura Football Association
- Indian football league system
