= Maharana Pratap Sports College =

College in Uttarakhand, India

- Other names: Raipur Sports College, Dehradun Sports College
- Type: Sports College
- Established: 1993
- Academic affiliations: Uttarakhand Board
- Location: Raipur, Dehradun, Uttarakhand, 248001, India; 30.3030°N 78.1044°E
- Website: www.mpscollege.in

Maharana Pratap Sports College is a sports academy and a college in Raipur, Dehradun, Uttarakhand. It offers sports training in six sports, Athletics, Football, Volleyball, Boxing, Cricket and Field hockey in sixth to twelfth standard and with the curriculum of Uttarakhand Board. It was only sports college in the state until the establishment of Hari Singh Thapa Sports College at Pithoragarh.

== Sports facilities ==
- Multipurpose Indoor Stadium
- Rajiv Gandhi International Cricket Stadium, Dehradun
- Astroturf Hockey Ground
- Athletic field
- Cricket Ground
- Football Ground
