= Gujarat State Women's League =

- Organising body: Gujarat State Football Association (GSFA)
- Founded: 2019; 7 years ago
- Country: India
- Number of clubs: 7
- Level on pyramid: 3
- Promotion to: Indian Women's League 2
- Current champions: SAG (2nd title) (2026)
- Most championships: SAG (2 titles)
- Broadcaster(s): GSFA (YouTube)
- Website: GSFA

The Gujarat State Women's League is the top division of women's football league in the Indian state of Gujarat. The league is organised by the Gujarat State Football Association (GSFA), the official football governing body of the state. Matches are held at the Ahmedabad, Himmatnagar and Ankleshwar.

== Clubs ==
=== 2026 season ===
The teams participating in the 2026 season:

No.	Team
1	ARA
2	Kahaani FC
3	Dodgers FC
4	Sports Authority of Gujarat FA (SAG)
5	Sports Authority of Gujarat FA Reserves (SAG R)
6	Sports Authority of Gujarat FA Vadnagar

== Champions ==
Season	Champion	Runners-up	Ref
2019	Baroda FA	Patan FC	
2020–21	King Star FC	Patan FC	
2021–22	ARA	Kahaani SA	
2022–23	Kahaani SA	Baroda FA	
2023–24	SAG	Patan FC	
2026	SAG	Kahaani SA	
