= Delhi Women's League =

Indian regional women's association football league in Delhi

Delhi Women's Premier League
- Organising body: Delhi Soccer Association
- Founded: 2021; 5 years ago
- Country: India
- Number of clubs: 10
- Level on pyramid: 3–4
- Promotion to: Indian Women's League 2
- Current champions: Juba Sangha (1st title) (2025–26)
- Most championships: Hans FC; Garhwal United (2 titles each)
- Broadcaster(s): SportsCast India (YouTube)
- Website: Official website

Former logo (2020–23)

The Delhi Women's League is the top division of women's football league in the Indian union territory of Delhi. It has been founded under the current name in 2021. Inaugural season was played with 10 teams divided into 2 groups, with Hans FC becoming the champions. The tournament also serves as qualification for the Indian Women's League 2.

== League structure ==
Delhi Women's League
Tier	Division
I _{(3 on Indian Women's Football Pyramid)}	Delhi Women's Premier League
II _{(4 on Indian Women's Football Pyramid)}	Delhi Women's Championship

== Clubs ==
=== 2024–25 season ===
No.	Team
1	City FC
2	Rangers SC
3	Garhwal United
4	Sudeva Delhi
5	HOPS
6	Royal Rangers FC
7	Eves SC
8	Eimi Heroes FC
9	Signature FC
10	Ahbab FC
11	Hans Capital FC
12	Delhi United
13	Juba Sangha FC

== Champions ==
Edition	Season	Champion	Runners-up
1st	2020–21	Hans FC	HOPS
2nd	2021–22	Hans FC	Signature FC
3rd	2022–23	HOPS	Garhwal United
4th	2023–24	Garhwal United	Rangers SC
5th	2024–25	Garhwal United	Juba Sangha
6th	2025–26	Juba Sangha	Garhwal United
