= Ladakh Women's Football Premier League =

- Organising body: Ladakh Football Association (LFA)
- Founded: 2026; 0 years ago
- Country: India
- Number of clubs: 8
- Level on pyramid: 3
- Current champions: Ladakh SFA (1st title) (2026)
- Most championships: Ladakh SFA (1 title)

The Ladakh Women's Football Premier League is the top division of women's football league in the Indian union territory of Ladakh. The league is organised by the Ladakh Football Association (LFA), the official football governing body of the Union Territory.

The inaugural season was won by Ladakh FSA.

== League format ==
The debut season featured teams from four districts participating in a league-cum-knockout format, with a final to determine the champion.

== Venue ==
The matches are held at Spituk Football Stadium in Leh.

== Clubs ==
=== 2026 season ===
Locations of Ladakh Women's Football Premier League clubs

The clubs registered for the inaugural editions:

No.	Team	Location
1	Changthang Football Initiative	Nyoma
2	Imamiya Mission School	Chuchot Gongma
3	JNV Leh	Leh
4	Hydra FC Baroo	Kargil
5	Humas FC	Dras
6	Ladakh Football School and Academy	Leh
7	Leh FC	Leh
8	Unified Ladakh FC	Leh

== Champions ==
Season	Champion	Runners-up	Ref
2026	Ladakh FSA	Unified Ladakh FC	
