= Meghalaya Women's State League =

- Organising body: Meghalaya Football Association (MFA)
- Founded: 2025; 1 year ago
- Country: India
- Number of clubs: 13
- Level on pyramid: 3
- Promotion to: Indian Women's League 2
- Relegation to: District leagues
- Current champions: Jakrem SC (1st title) (2025)
- Most championships: Jakrem SC (1 title)
- Broadcaster(s): T7 News Channel (YouTube)

The Meghalaya Women's State League is the top division of women's football league in the Indian state of Meghalaya. The league is organised by the Meghalaya Football Association (MFA), the official football governing body of the state.

The inaugural season was held in 2025.

== League format ==
The first state women's league consists of the top teams from the district associations affiliated to the Meghalaya FA, with the winners qualifying for the Indian Women's League 2. The league is based on the Meghalaya State League, the men's counterpart with 13 teams participating in the inaugural edition. They were split into three groups.

== Competition structure ==
Tier	Division
I _{(3 on Indian Women's football pyramid)}	Meghalaya Women's State League
II _{(4 on Indian Women's football pyramid)}	District leagues (SSA Women's Football League, and others)

== Venue ==
The matches are held at the SSA Stadium, MFA Ground, Mawlum Tyrsa Ground, EJDSA Ground, Laskein Ground

== Clubs ==
=== 2025 season ===
The teams participating in the 2025 season:

MWSL participants
Group A (Shillong)	Group B (Tysad)	Group C (Khliehriat/Laskein)
Laitkor SC	Mawlum Tyrsad SC	Diengshynrum SC
Na Rympei FA	Jakrem SC	Chirupheiwei Nongkynrih FC
Pay For Right FA	Mawten SC	—N/a
Lapalang SSCC	Bright Future SSCC	—N/a
Pahamsyiem SC	Mawsawrit SC	—N/a
—N/a	Young Sports SCC	—N/a

== Champions ==
Season	Champion	Runners-up	Ref
2025	Jakrem SC	Na Rympei FA	
