= Manipur Women's League =

Women's association football league in Manipur, India

- Organising body: All Manipur Football Association
- Founded: 2009; 17 years ago
- Country: India
- Number of clubs: 8
- Level on pyramid: 3
- Promotion to: Indian Women's League 2
- Current champions: Youth Welfare Club, Thambalkhong (1st title) (2025–26)
- Most championships: Manipur Police (6 titles)

The Manipur Women's League, also the AMFA Senior Women's Football League, is the top division of women's football league in the Indian state of Manipur. It was also known as the A. Shanta Meetei Memorial Senior Women's Football League (earlier held as the BM Singh Trophy). The League is organised by the All Manipur Football Association (AMFA), the official football governing body of the state.

== Venue ==
The matches are held at various stadiums inc Khuman Lampak Main Stadium, Artificial turf, Khurai Lamlong at Imphal.

== Clubs ==
=== 2025–26 season ===
The teams participating in the 2025–26 season:

No.	Team	Location
1	Eastern Sporting Union	Wangkhei, Imphal East
2	FC Imphal	Kwakeithel Mayaikoibi, Imphal West
3	ICSA	Iregbam, Bishnupur
4	Khuman FC	Laipham Khunou, Imphal East
5	KRYPHSA	Naoremthong Laishram Leikai, Imphal West
6	Manipur Police	Police HQ, Imphal
7	Manipur United FA	Tera Lukram Leirak, Sagolband, Imphal
8	The Young Welfare Club	Langthabal, Imphal West
9	Youth Welfare Club	Thambalkhong, Imphal East
10	United Pukhao Sports Association (UPSA)	Pukhao Khabam, Imphal East

== Champions ==
Note: The first Manipur women's championship was held in 1976 with Eastern Sporting Union being the winners and TRAU being the runners-up.

Edition	Season	Champion	Runner-up	Ref
1st	2009			
2nd	2010	Manipur Police		
3rd	2011	Manipur Police	Eastern Sporting Union	
4th	2013	Manipur Police	Eastern Sporting Union	
5th	2014	Eastern Sporting Union	Manipur Police	
6th	2015	Manipur Police	KRYPHSA	
7th	2016	KRYPHSA		
8th	2017	Eastern Sporting Union	KRYPHSA	
9th	2018	Manipur Police	Eastern Sporting Union	
10th	2019	KRYPHSA	Eastern Sporting Union	
11th	2021	Eastern Sporting Union	Young Welfare Club, Langthabal	
12th	2021–22	Young Welfare Club, Langthabal	KRYPHSA	
13th	2022–23	Eastern Sporting Union	KRYPHSA	
14th	2023–24	Manipur Police	KRYPHSA	
15th	2024–25	FC Imphal	Manipur Police	
16th	2026–27	Youth Welfare Club, Thambalkhong	Young Welfare Club, Langthabal	
