= Assam Women's League =

- Organising body: Assam Football Association (AFA)
- Founded: 2023; 3 years ago
- Country: India
- Number of clubs: 12
- Level on pyramid: 3
- Promotion to: Indian Women's League 2
- Current champions: KASA Girls FC (2nd title) (2024–25)
- Most championships: KASA Girls FC (2 titles)

The Assam Women's League is the top division of women's football league in the Indian state of Assam. The league is organised by the Assam Football Association (AFA), the official football governing body of the state. The inaugural season was held in 2023.

== League format ==
The league features twelve teams, placed in three groups. The group stage of the league consist of round robin phase with two winners from each group progressing to the final round. The winners of the final round will be crowned the champions of the Assam Women's League.

== Venue ==
The matches are held at Bijni, Salbari and Goreswar.

== Clubs ==
Teams participating in the 2024–25 season:

No.	Team	Location
1	Akash FC	Guwahati
2	JB Club	Nagaon
3	Karbi Anglong Sports Association Girls FC	Diphu
4	Oil Lakshya Women's XI	Dibrugarh
5	State Football Academy	Guwahati

== Champions ==
Season	Champion	Runners-up	Ref
2023–24	Karbi Anglong Sports Association Girls FC	Sonari Town Club	
2024–25	Karbi Anglong Sports Association Girls FC	Oil Lakshya Women's XI	
