= Madhya Pradesh Women's Premier League =

Top tier women's football league in Madhya Pradesh

Madhya Pradesh Women’s Premier League
- Organising body: Madhya Pradesh Football Association (MPFA)
- Founded: 2021; 5 years ago
- Country: India
- Number of clubs: 6
- Level on pyramid: 3
- Promotion to: Indian Women's League 2
- Current champions: Narmada Valley FC (1st title) (2025–26)
- Most championships: Barwani FC; Narmada Valley FC (1 title)

The Madhya Pradesh Women's Premier League is the top division of women's football league in the Indian state of Chhattisgarh. The league is organised by the Madhya Pradesh Football Association (MPFA), the official football governing body of the state. The first edition was held in 2021, which was won by Barwani FC.

== Teams ==
=== 2025–26 season ===
- National Football Club, Indore
- Tagore FC, Bhopal
- Narmada Valley FC, Mandla
- Casa Barwani Soccer club, Barwani
- Loyal Waves FC, Bhopal
- BLG – The Diamond Rock FC, Balaghat

== Summary ==
| Season | Champions | Runners-up | Ref |
|---|---|---|---|
| 2020–21 | Barwani FC | | |
| 2022–25 | Not held | | |
| 2025–26 | Narmada Valley FC | National FC Indore | |

== See also ==
- Madhya Pradesh Football Association
