= Mizoram Women's League =

- Organising body: Mizoram Football Association (MFA)
- Founded: 2019; 7 years ago
- Country: India
- Number of clubs: 6
- Level on pyramid: 3
- Current champions: James & Judas Memorial FC (1st title) (2025–26)
- Most championships: Mizo Football News FC (2 titles)
- Broadcaster(s): PCLala Photography Official (YouTube); Zonet (final only)

The Mizoram Women's League, (also known as MBOCWWB MFA Women's League for sponsorship reasons), is the top division of women's football league in the Indian state of Mizoram. The league is organised by the Mizoram Football Association (MFA), the official football governing body of the state.

The inaugural season was held in 2019 and was won by ITI Veng.

== Venue ==
The matches are held at the stadiums in Aizawl such as Lammual Stadium, Chite Veng Playground.

== Clubs ==
=== Current season ===
The teams participating in the 2025–26 season:

Group A	Group B
Starlight FC	LM FC
Lalhmachhuani Memorial FC	James & Judas Memorial FC
NCC Mizoram FC	Tlangvaltea FC
Springfield HSS FC	Mizo Football News FC

== Champions ==
Season	Champion	Runners-up	Ref
2019	ITI Veng	Maubawk WFC	
2022–23	SYS FC A	SYS FC B	
2023–24	Mizo Football News FC	Kulikawn FC	
2024–25	Mizo Football News FC	Kulikawn FC	
2025–26	James & Judas Memorial FC	Springfield HSS FC	
