= Tamil Nadu Women's League =

- Organising body: Tamil Nadu Football Association
- Founded: 2019; 7 years ago
- Country: India
- Number of clubs: 6
- Level on pyramid: 3
- Promotion to: Indian Women's League 2
- Current champions: Sethu (3rd title) (2021–22)
- Most championships: Sethu (3 titles)
- Broadcaster(s): Football Makka (YouTube)

The Tamil Nadu Women's League is the top division of women's football league in the Indian state of Tamil Nadu. The League is organised by the Tamil Nadu Football Association (TNFA), the official football governing body of the state.

== History ==
The state women's league was formulated during the tenure of Seeni Mohaideen, chairman of the women’s committee of the Tamil Nadu Football Association. The inaugural tournament was held in the 2019–20 season and was won by Sethu FC.

The matches are usually held at Jawaharlal Nehru Stadium in Chennai.

== Media coverage ==
The league matches are live-streamed on YouTube by Football Makka.

== Clubs ==
=== 2021–22 season ===
The teams which participated in the 2021–22 season:

No.	Team	Location
1	Sethu	Madurai
2	SDAT Excellence Club	Chennai
3	FC Thamizhatchi	
4	Tamil Nadu Police	Chennai
5	Minerva FC	
6	Wow Women's FC	

== Champions ==
Edition	Season	Champion	Runners-up	Ref
1st	2019–20	Sethu	Tamil Nadu Police	
2nd	2020–21	Sethu	SDAT Excellence Club	
3rd	2021–22	Sethu	SDAT Excellence Club	

== See also ==
- Football in India
