= Punjab Women's League =

- Organising body: Punjab Football Association (PFA)
- Founded: 2018; 8 years ago
- Country: India
- Number of clubs: 4
- Level on pyramid: 3
- Promotion to: Indian Women's League 2
- Current champions: CRPF (7th title) (2025–26)
- Most championships: CRPF (7 titles)
- Current: 2026–27

The Punjab Women's League (also known as the JCT Punjab Women's League for sponsorship reasons) is the top division of women's football league in the Indian state of Punjab. The league is organised by the Punjab Football Association (PFA), the official football governing body of the state. The first edition was held in 2018.

== Venue ==
The matches are held at GNDU Sports Complex, CRPF Sports Complex and Khalsa College Ground.

== Clubs ==
=== 2026–27 season ===
The teams participating in the 2026–27 season:

No.	Team
1	CRPF
2	Footie Skill FA, Jalandhar
3	Lovely Professional University Tigers
4	Guru Nanak Dev University FC (GNDU FC)
5	Punjab
6	Skiller Football Academy

== Champions ==
Season	Champion	Runners-up	Ref
2018	CRPF		
2019	BBK Dav FC		
2020–21	CRPF	BBK DAV FC	
2021–22	CRPF	BBK DAV FC	
2022–23	CRPF		
2023–24	CRPF	Guru Nanak Dev University FC	
2024–25	CRPF	Guru Nanak Dev University FC	
2025–26	CRPF	Guru Nanak Dev University FC	
