= Chhattisgarh State Women's Football League =

Top tier women's football league in Chhattisgarh

- Organising body: Chhattisgarh Football Association (CGFA)
- Founded: 2021; 5 years ago
- Country: India
- Number of clubs: 6
- Level on pyramid: 3
- Promotion to: Indian Women's League 2
- Current champions: Mata Rukmani Girls (4th title) (2026)
- Most championships: Mata Rukmani Girls (4 titles)

The Chhattisgarh State Women's Football League is the top division of women's football league in the Indian state of Chhattisgarh. The league is organised by the Chhattisgarh Football Association (CFA), the official football governing body of the state. The first edition was held in 2021, which was won by Mata Rukmani Girls from Bastar.

== Teams ==
=== 2024–25 season ===
- RKM Football Academy
- MGM Ambush Club, Bhilai
- Universal Girls FC
- Girls Football Club Dondi
- Maa Sharda Football Academy
- Shera FC Academy

== Summary ==
Season	Champions	Runners-up	Ref
2021	Mata Rukmani Girls	MGM Ambush Club	
2022	Mata Rukmani Girls		
2023	Mata Rukmani Girls	MGM Ambush Club	
2024	MGM Ambush Club	Shera FC Academy	
2025	MGM Ambush Club	RKM Football Academy	
2026	Mata Rukmani Girls	MGM Ambush Club	

== See also ==
- Chhattisgarh Football Association
