= 2026–27 Indian Women's League 2 =

Indian Women's League 2
- Season: 2026–27
- Dates: 24 October 2026 – 2027
- Matches: 32
- Goals: 148 (4.63 per match)
- Biggest win: Mata Rukmani FC 0–22 United Kolkata SC (24 October 2026)
- Highest scoring: Mata Rukmani FC 0–22 United Kolkata SC (24 October 2026)
- Longest winning run: United Kolkata (4 matches)
- Longest unbeaten run: United Kolkata (4 matches)
- All statistics correct as of 1 November 2026.

The 2026–27 Indian Women's League 2 will be the fourth season of the Indian Women's League 2 (IWL2), the second tier women's football league in India. HOPS were the champions of the previous edition. They were promoted to the 2026–27 IWL alongside Juba Sangha.

== Qualification ==
The teams qualifying and nominated from the 2025–26 Indian State Leagues will join the remaining 2025–26 Indian Women's League 2 and the 2025–26 Indian Women's League relegated teams for the season. This edition will have 18 teams, with the season starting from 23 October 2026.

Relegated from Indian Women's League

- Sribhumi ▼ (Withdrawn)
- Sesa ▼

Team	State/Region	Qualifying method
2025–26 Indian Women's League 2
Krida Prabodhini	Maharashtra	Final round
Mumbai Knights	Maharashtra	Final round
Kemp	Karnataka	Final round
DKR	Telangana	Group stage
2025–26 Indian Women's State leagues
SAG	Gujarat	2026 Gujarat State Women's League champions
Mata Rukmani Girls	Chhattisgarh	2026 Chhattisgarh State Women's Football League champions
Sports Odisha	Odisha	2026 Odisha Women's League third place (Note: The 26 season champions is part of Indian Women's League.)
Rangers	Delhi	2025–26 Delhi Women's League third place (Note: The 2025–26 season champions and runners-up are part of Indian Women's League.)
Misaka United	Karnataka	2025–26 Karnataka Women's League runners-up (Note: The 2025–26 season champions is part of Indian Women's League.)
Zinc Football	Rajasthan	2025–26 Rajasthan Women's League champions
Youth Welfare Club	Manipur	2026–27 Manipur Women's League champions
Sporting Bacaim	Maharashtra	2025–26 Maharashtra State Senior Women's Football League runners-up (Note: The 2025–26 season champions is part of Indian Women's League 2.)
United Kolkata	West Bengal	2025–26 Calcutta Women's Football League runners-up (Note: The 2025–26 season champions is part of Indian Women's League.)
Jakrem	Meghalaya	2026 Meghalaya Women's State League champions
GNDU	Punjab	2025–26 Punjab Women's League champions
Narmada Valley	Madhya Pradesh	2025–26 Madhya Pradesh Women's Premier League champions
Others
AIFF Academy	Telangana	AIFF Developmental Team

== Teams ==
Locations of the IWL 2 teams
Group A
Group B
Group C
Group D

=== Stadiums and locations ===
Group	City	Stadium
Group A	Navi Mumbai	Football Navi Mumbai Centre of Excellence
Group B	Bhubaneswar	Capital Football Arena
Group C	Shillong	SSA Stadium
Group D	Mapusa	Duler Stadium

Team	City/Region	State
Group A
Sporting Bacaim (host)	Mumbai	Maharashtra
United Kolkata	Kolkata	West Bengal
SAG	Gandhinagar	Gujarat
Mata Rukmani Girls	Bastar	Chhattisgarh
GNDU	Amritsar	Punjab
Group B
Sports Odisha (host)	Bhubaneswar	Odisha
DKR	Nizamabad	Telangana
Narmada Valley	Mandla	Madhya Pradesh
Youth Welfare Club	Imphal	Manipur
Krida Prabodhini	Pune	Maharashtra
Group C
Jakrem (host)	South West Khasi Hills	Meghalaya
Kemp	Bengaluru	Karnataka
Mumbai Knights	Mumbai	Maharashtra
AIFF Academy	Hyderabad	Telangana
Group D
Sesa (host)	Sircaim	Goa
Rangers	New Delhi	Delhi
Zinc Football	Udaipur	Rajasthan
Misaka United	Bengaluru	Karnataka

== Personnel ==
Team	Head coach	Captain
AIFF Academy	(India) Rutuja Gunwant	(India) Aysha Sartape
DKR	(India) Gottipati Nagaraju	(India) Kodi Alekhya
GNDU	(India) Sukhvir Singh	(India) Simran
Jakrem	(India) Janbor Marbaniang	(India) Catherine Kharkongor
Kemp	(India) Praveen Raju Devaraj Varalakshmi	(India) Mithila Ramani
Krida Prabodhini	(India) Dhiraj Mishra	(India) Rani Kadam
Mata Rukmani Girls	(India) Prerna Mishra	(India) Pinki Kashyap
Misaka United	(India) Yeshwanth Reddy Mekala	(India) Tarini Kumar
Mumbai Knights	(India) Murgesh Udayar Nadar	(India) Deepika Venkatesh
Narmada Valley	(India) Laxmi Sahees	(India) Tejaswini Maravi
Rangers	(India) Munish Kumar	(India) Parul
Sesa	(India) Gavin Elias Araujo	(India) Simran Narvekar
Sporting Bacaim	(India) Mitchel Ivan Silva	(India) Arya More
SAG	(India) Hemanshu Chowhan	(India) Jeelkumari Damor
Sports Odisha	(India) Jaspal Urma	(India) Satyabati Khadia
United Kolkata	(India) Kulsum Bi Shaikh	(India) Bala Devi
Youth Welfare Club	(India) Tomba Singh	(India) Roshibina Chanu Moiranghtem
Zinc Football	(India) Amrutha Aravind Valliyath	(India) Mira Devi Pukhrambam

== Venues ==
Stage	Group	City	Stadium	Capacity
Group stage	A	Navi Mumbai	Navi Mumbai CoE	NA
Group stage	B	Bhubaneswar	Capital Football Arena	NA
Group stage	C	Shillong	SSA Football Stadium	5,000
Group stage	D	Mapusa	Duler Stadium	10,000
Final round		TBC		

== Group stage ==
=== Group A ===
Pos	Team	Pld	W	D	L	GF	GA	GD	Pts	Qualification
1	United Kolkata	4	4	0	0	37	1	+36	12	Final round
2	Sporting Bacaim (H)	4	3	0	1	15	3	+12	9	Final round
3	GNDU	4	2	0	2	6	10	−4	6	
4	SAG	4	0	1	3	1	16	−15	1	
5	Mata Rukmani Girls	4	0	1	3	3	32	−29	1	

Source: IFL
Rules for classification: 1) points; 2) head-to-head points; 3) head-to-head goal difference; 4) goal difference; 5) number of goals scored; 6) drawing of lots
(H) Hosts

==== Matches ====
24 October 2026	Mata Rukmani Girls	0–22	United Kolkata	Navi Mumbai
09:00		IFL; Report	Priya Ruidas 6'; Linda 11', 43', 57', 63', 76'; Ngangom 14', 21', 25', 42', 44', 49', 65', 68'; Kai Rumi 18', 47', 58'; Tanusree Roy 60', 87', 90+6'; Yumnam 89'; Sonali Soren 90+4'	Stadium: Football Navi Mumbai Centre of Excellence; Attendance: 50; Referee: Vikas; Player of the Match: Bala Devi Ngangom (United Kolkata)

24 October 2026	GNDU	4–0	SAG	Navi Mumbai
16:00	Bandana 5'; Pushpa Devi 34'; Palak 39'; Neha 41'	IFL; Report		Stadium: Football Navi Mumbai Centre of Excellence; Attendance: 60; Referee: Deepraj Sangelkar (GNDU); Player of the Match: Palak

26 October 2026	SAG	0–5	Sporting Bacaim	Navi Mumbai
09:00		IFL; Report	Arya More 8', 77'; Ani Tayang 30'; Alisha Lyngdoh 42'; Khushbu Saroj 66'	Stadium: Football Navi Mumbai Centre of Excellence; Attendance: 50; Referee: Neetu Rana; Player of the Match: Arya More (Sporting Bacaim)

26 October 2026	GNDU	2–1	Mata Rukmani Girls	Navi Mumbai
16:00	Khushbu 17'; Palak 51'	IFL; Report	Payal Yadav 45+1'	Stadium: Football Navi Mumbai Centre of Excellence; Attendance: 45; Referee: Sen Hangma Subba; Player of the Match: Yogita (Mata Rukmani Girls)

28 October 2026	Sporting Bacaim	2–0	GNDU	Navi Mumbai
09:00	Arya More 44'; Ani Tayang 45+3'	IFL; Report		Stadium: Football Navi Mumbai Centre of Excellence; Attendance: 50; Referee: R Kannan; Player of the Match: Ani Tayang (Sporting Bacaim)

28 October 2026	United Kolkata	6–0	SAG	Navi Mumbai
16:00	Linda 21'; Yumnam 40'; Ngangom 43', 73' (pen.); Kai Rumi 69'; Sonia Marak 86'	IFL; Report		Stadium: Football Navi Mumbai Centre of Excellence; Attendance: 50; Referee: Deepraj Sangelkar; Player of the Match: Kai Rumi (United Kolkata)

30 October 2026	United Kolkata	7–0	GNDU	Navi Mumbai
09:00	Anita Kumari 17', 61'; Ngangom 22', 45', 52', 59', 67'	IFL; Report		Stadium: Football Navi Mumbai Centre of Excellence; Attendance: 45; Referee: Sen Hangma Subba; Player of the Match: Bala Devi Ngangom (United Kolkata)

30 October 2026	Mata Rukmani Girls	1–7	Sporting Bacaim	Navi Mumbai
16:00	Payal Yadav 64'	IFL; Report	Khushbu Saroj 11', 25', 72'; Rebecca Zamthianmawi 14'; Aishwarya Jagtap 21', 40'; Devika Yadav 66'	Stadium: Football Navi Mumbai Centre of Excellence; Attendance: 25; Referee: Vikas; Player of the Match: Khushbu Saroj (Sporting Bacaim)

1 November 2026	SAG	1–1	Mata Rukmani Girls	Navi Mumbai
09:00	Gundiya Manju 11'	IFL; Report	Jyoti Nag 90'	Stadium: Football Navi Mumbai Centre of Excellence; Attendance: 50; Referee: R. Kannan; Player of the Match: Gundiya Manju (SAG)

1 November 2026	Sporting Bacaim	1–2	United Kolkata	Navi Mumbai
16:00	Arya More 80'	IFL; Report	Ngangom 40'; Anita Kumari 45+3'	Stadium: Football Navi Mumbai Centre of Excellence; Attendance: 250; Referee: Neetu Rana; Player of the Match: Kamala Devi Yumnam (United Kolkata)

=== Group B ===
Pos	Team	Pld	W	D	L	GF	GA	GD	Pts	Qualification
1	Youth Welfare Club	4	3	1	0	13	3	+10	10	Final round
2	Narmada Valley	4	1	3	0	11	6	+5	6	
3	Sports Odisha (H)	4	1	2	1	9	8	+1	5	
4	Krida Prabodhini	4	0	3	1	10	15	−5	3	
5	DKR	4	0	1	3	8	19	−11	1	

Source: IFL
Rules for classification: 1) points; 2) head-to-head points; 3) head-to-head goal difference; 4) goal difference; 5) number of goals scored; 6) drawing of lots
(H) Hosts

==== Matches ====
24 October 2026	Narmada Valley	6–1	DKR	Bhubaneswar
08:00	Ambika Dhurwey 45+3'; Lalita 53', 54', 65'; Neelam Pusam 57', 83'	IFL; Report	Laxmi Thatal 42'	Stadium: Capital Football Arena; Attendance: 30; Referee: RD Hringnidam; Player of the Match: Lalita (Narmada Valley)

24 October 2026	Krida Prabodhini	0–5	Youth Welfare Club	Bhubaneswar
15:00		IFL; Report	Alva Devi Senjam 10', 52'; Herina Basumatary 29'; Abema Devi Phanjoubam 56'; Luxmi Devi Athokpam 82'	Stadium: Capital Football Arena; Attendance: 55; Referee: Kishan Dash; Player of the Match: Luxmi Devi Athokpam (Youth Welfare Club)

26 October 2026	Youth Welfare Club	3–2	Sports Odisha	Bhubaneswar
08:00	Abema Devi Phanjoubam 56'; Rosy Thanga 74'; Herina Basumatary 29'	IFL; Report	Naik 25'; Satyabati Khadia 83'	Stadium: Capital Football Arena; Attendance: 60; Referee: Suvankar Das; Player of the Match: Herina Basumatary (Youth Welfare Club)

26 October 2026	Krida Prabodhini	4–4	Narmada Valley	Bhubaneswar
15:00	Sumaiyya Shaikh 10', 86', 88'; Mangpineng Khongsai 75'	IFL; Report	Lalita 23'; Neelam Pusam 34', 89'; Ambika Dhurwey 66' (pen.)	Stadium: Capital Football Arena; Attendance: 35; Referee: Pipilmoris Wanniang; Player of the Match: Sumaiyya Shaikh (Krida Prabodhini)

28 October 2026	Sports Odisha	2–2	Krida Prabodhini	Bhubaneswar
08:00	Naik 67'; Rupashree Munda 76'	IFL; Report	Payal Kothari 52', 62'	Stadium: Capital Football Arena; Attendance: 45; Referee: RD Hringnidam; Player of the Match: Manisha Naik (Sports Odisha)

28 October 2026	DKR	1–5	Youth Welfare Club	Bhubaneswar
15:00	GVR Namratha 35'	IFL; Reort	Rosy Thanga 44'; Silky Devi Sorokhaibam 47'; Alva Devi Senjam 79', 90+1'; Herina Basumatary 88'	Stadium: Capital Football Arena; Attendance: 25; Referee: Avisekh Saha; Player of the Match: Silky Devi Sorokhaibam (Youth Welfare Club)

30 October 2026	DKR	4–4	Krida Prabodhini	Bhubaneswar
08:00	Hoineihat 41', 45', 45+6'; Manju Kanwar 59'	Report	Sumaiyya Shaikh 24', 82'; Aarya Chaudhare 39', 45+4'	Stadium: Capital Football Arena; Attendance: 20; Referee: Suvankar Das; Player of the Match: Hoineihat (DKR)

30 October 2026	Narmada Valley	1–1	Sports Odisha	Bhubaneswar
15:00	Neelam Pusam 90+1'	IFL; Report	Munda 90+5'	Stadium: Capital Football Arena; Attendance: 60; Referee: Pipilmoris Wanniang; Player of the Match: Neelam Pusam (Narmada Valley)

1 November 2026	Youth Welfare Club	0–0	Narmada Valley	Bhubaneswar
08:00		IFL; Report		Stadium: Capital Football Arena; Attendance: 25; Referee: Kishan Dash; Player of the Match: Pooja Wate (Narmada Valley)

1 November 2026	Sports Odisha	4–2	DKR	Bhubaneswar
15:00	Satyabati Khadia 9'; Naik 45'; Malati Munda 45+6', 90+4'	IFL; Report	Manju Kanwar 70', 71'	Stadium: Capital Football Arena; Attendance: 60; Referee: Avisekh Saha; Player of the Match: Malati Munda (Sports Odisha)

=== Group C ===
Pos	Team	Pld	W	D	L	GF	GA	GD	Pts	Qualification
1	Jakrem (H)	3	3	0	0	8	3	+5	9	Final round
2	Kemp	3	2	0	1	9	5	+4	6	Final round
3	AIFF Academy	3	0	1	2	3	7	−4	1	
4	Mumbai Knights	3	0	1	2	2	7	−5	1	

Source: IFL
Rules for classification: 1) points; 2) head-to-head points; 3) head-to-head goal difference; 4) goal difference; 5) number of goals scored; 6) drawing of lots
(H) Hosts

==== Matches ====
25 October 2026	Mumbai Knights	1–3	Kemp	Shillong
09:00	Sushmita Bardhan 87'	IFL; Report	Markkadharshi R 40'; Puja Pachi 62'; Asika K 90+1'	Stadium: SSA Stadium; Attendance: 50; Referee: Ningnihring SR Anal; Player of the Match: Markkadharshi R (Kemp)

25 October 2026	Jakrem	2–1	AIFF Academy	Shillong
14:30	Makrisha Songthiang 11'; Bahunlang Synrem 65'	IFL; Report	Roshibina Chanu Khumanthem 56'	Stadium: SSA Stadium; Attendance: 500; Referee: Kanika Barman; Player of the Match: Makrisha Songthiang (Jakrem)

27 October 2026	AIFF Academy	1–1	Mumbai Knights	Shillong
09:00	Vanisree M K 45+1'	IFL; Report	Geetika Negi 83'	Stadium: SSA Stadium; Attendance: 50; Referee: Pynskhemhame Mawthoh; Player of the Match: Geetika Negi (Mumbai Knights)

27 October 2026	Kemp	2–3	Jakrem	Shillong
14:30	Puja Pachi 1'; Aarushi Santhosh 63'	IFL; Report	Darishisha Kharlyngdoh 19'; Marbarin Nongrum 25'; Makrisha Songthiang 66'	Stadium: SSA Stadium; Attendance: 1,167; Referee: Baju Tussoh; Player of the Match: Makrisha Songthiang (Jakrem)

29 October 2026	Kemp	4–1	AIFF Academy	Shillong
09:00	Sonali Mondal 3'; Puja Pachi 8'; Mandala 30'; Asika K 81'	IFL; Report	Sanvi Chaubey 33'	Stadium: SSA Stadium; Attendance: 50; Referee: Kanika Barman; Player of the Match: Anusha Mandala (Kemp)

29 October 2026	Mumbai Knights	0–3	Jakrem	Shillong
14:30		IFL; Report	Bahunlang Synrem 40'; Iaphisha Marbaniang 60'; Marbarin Nongrum 67'	Stadium: SSA Stadium; Attendance: 1,200; Referee: Ningnihring SR Anal; Player of the Match: Marbarin Nongrum (Jakrem)

=== Group D ===
Pos	Team	Pld	W	D	L	GF	GA	GD	Pts	Qualification
1	Sesa (H)	3	2	1	0	7	1	+6	7	Final round
2	Rangers	3	1	2	0	3	1	+2	5	
3	Misaka United	3	1	0	2	2	4	−2	3	
4	Zinc Football	3	0	1	2	1	7	−6	1	

Source: IFL
Rules for classification: 1) points; 2) head-to-head points; 3) head-to-head goal difference; 4) goal difference; 5) number of goals scored; 6) drawing of lots
(H) Hosts

==== Matches ====
25 October 2026	Zinc Football	0–0	Rangers	Mapusa
09:00		IFL; Report		Stadium: Duler Stadium; Attendance: 50; Referee: Pooja S Player of the Match: Parwati Yadav (Rangers)

25 October 2026	Sesa	1–0	Misaka United	Mapusa
16:00	Simran Narvekar 73'	IFL; Report		Stadium: Duler Stadium; Attendance: 100; Referee: Kusum Mandi; Player of the Match: Simran Narvekar (Sesa)

27 October 2026	Misaka United	2–1	Zinc Football	Mapusa
09:00	Tarini Sibal 83'; Iaraplang Nongrum 89'	IFL; Report	Routray 36'	Stadium: Duler Stadium; Attendance: 50; Referee: Jestin Jose Kuzhivelil; Player of the Match: Tarini Sibal (Misaka United)

27 October 2026	Rangers	1–1	Sesa	Mapusa
16:00	Parul 61'	IFL; Report	Sulekha Kanhar 12'	Stadium: Duler Stadium; Attendance: 100; Referee: Vinay Kondamuri; Player of the Match: Rekha (Rangers)

29 October 2026	Rangers	2–0	Misaka United	Mapusa
09:00	Simran 59'; Ruchi 90+4'	IFL; Report		Stadium: Duler Stadium; Attendance: 50; Referee: Kusum Mandi; Player of the Match: Sanjana (Rangers)

29 October 2026	Zinc Football	0–5	Sesa	Mapusa
16:00		IFL; Report	Aniela Barretto 25', 45+1'; Simran Narvekar 61'; Pearl Fernandes 66'; Valaina Fernandes 90'	Stadium: Duler Stadium; Attendance: 100; Referee: Pooja S Player of the Match: Aniela Barretto (Sesa)

=== Ranking of second-placed teams ===
Pos	Grp	Team	Pld	W	D	L	GF	GA	GD	Pts	Qualification
1	A	Sporting Bacaim	3	2	0	1	8	2	+6	6	Advance to Final round
2	C	Kemp	3	2	0	1	9	5	+4	6	Advance to Final round
3	D	Rangers	3	1	2	0	3	1	+2	5	
4	B	Narmada Valley	3	0	3	0	5	5	0	3	

Source: IFL
Rules for classification: 1) points; 2) goal difference; 3) number of goals scored; 4) drawing of lots

== Final round ==
=== Standings ===
Pos	Team	Pld	W	D	L	GF	GA	GD	Pts	Promotion
1	Jakrem	0	0	0	0	0	0	0	0	Promotion to IWL
2	Kemp	0	0	0	0	0	0	0	0	Promotion to IWL
3	Sesa	0	0	0	0	0	0	0	0	
4	Sporting Bacaim	0	0	0	0	0	0	0	0	
5	United Kolkata	0	0	0	0	0	0	0	0	
6	Youth Welfare Club	0	0	0	0	0	0	0	0	

Updated to match(es) played on unknown. Source: IFL
Rules for classification: 1) points; 2) head-to-head points; 3) head-to-head goal difference; 4) goal difference; 5) number of goals scored; 6) drawing of lots

== See also ==
- Men
  - 2026–27 Indian Super League (Tier I)
  - 2026–27 Indian Football League (Tier II)
  - 2026–27 I-League 2 (Tier III)
  - 2026–27 I-League 3 (Tier IV)
  - 2026–27 Indian State Leagues (Tier V)
  - 2026–27 AIFF Super Cup
  - 2026 Durand Cup
  - 2026 Reliance Foundation Development League
- Women
  - 2026–27 Indian Women's League (Tier I)
