= 2025–26 Indian Women's League 2 =

Indian Women's League 2
- Season: 2025–26
- Dates: 20 March 2026 – 10 May 2026
- Champions: HOPS (1st title)
- Promoted: HOPS; Juba Sangha
- Matches: 41
- Goals: 141 (3.44 per match)
- Top goalscorer: Simran Gurung (9 goals)
- Biggest win: MGM Ambush 0–12 Suruchi Sangha (29 March 2026)
- Longest winning run: HOPS (9 matches)
- Longest unbeaten run: HOPS (9 matches)
- Longest winless run: Suruchi Sangha (5 matches)
- Longest losing run: Suruchi Sangha (5 matches)

The 2025–26 Indian Women's League 2 was the third season of the Indian Women's League 2 (IWL2), the second tier women's football league in India.

Garhwal United were the champions of the previous edition. They were promoted to the 2025–26 IWL alongside Sesa.

== Qualification ==
The teams qualifying and nominated from the 2024–25 Indian State Leagues will join the remaining 2024–25 Indian Women's League 2 and the 2024–25 Indian Women's League relegated teams for the season. This edition will have 14 teams, that will be split into two groups of five each and one group of four. The group stage will be played in a single round-robin format in two centralised locations in Karnataka and Kerala from 20 March to 29 March 2026.

Relegated from Indian Women's League

- Odisha ▼
- HOPS ▼

Team	State/Region	Qualifying method
2024–25 Indian Women's League 2
Krida Prabodhini	Maharashtra	Final round
Mumbai Knights	Maharashtra	Group stage
Roots	Karnataka	Final round
2024–25 Indian Women's State leagues
DKR	Telangana	2025 Telangana Women's League champions
Imphal	Manipur	2024–25 Manipur Women's League champions
Juba Sangha	Delhi	2024–25 Delhi Women's League runners-up (Note: 2024–25 season champions participates in IWL.)
KASA Girls	Assam	2024–25 Assam Women's League champions
Kemp	Karnataka	2024–25 Karnataka Women's League runners-up (Note: 2024–25 season champions participates in IWL.)
Kerala United	Kerala	2024–25 Kerala Women's League runners-up (Note: 2024–25 season champions participates in IWL.)
MGM Ambush	Chhattisgarh	2024–25 Chhattisgarh State Women's Football League champions
Suruchi Sangha	West Bengal	2024–25 Calcutta Women's Football League semifinalists (Note: Both the 2024–25 season champions and runners-up are part of Indian Women's League.)
Others
DFA Raisen	Madhya Pradesh	Nominated (Note: The state league was not held for the 2024–25 season. The winners of the state championship was nominated)

== Teams ==
Locations of the IWL 2 teams
Group A
Group B
Group C

=== Stadiums and locations ===
Group	City	Stadium	Capacity
Group A	Bengaluru	PD CSE Phase 2	250
Group B	Thrissur	Municipal Corporation Stadium	15,000
Group C	Bengaluru	PD CSE Phase 2	250

Team	City/Region	State
Group A
Roots (host)	Bengaluru	Karnataka
Odisha	Bhubaneswar	Odisha
Mumbai Knights	Mumbai	Maharashtra
DFA Raisen	Raisen	Madhya Pradesh
Juba Sangha FC	New Delhi	Delhi
Group B
Kerala United (host)	Malappuram	Kerala
KASA Girls FC	Diphu	Assam
HOPS	New Delhi	Delhi
Krida Prabodhini	Pune	Maharashtra
DKR Football Academy	Nizamabad	Telangana
Group C
Kemp (host)	Bengaluru	Karnataka
MGM Ambush FC	Raipur	Chhattisgarh
FC Imphal	Imphal	Manipur
Suruchi Sangha	Kolkata	West Bengal

== Personnel ==
Team	Head coach	Captain
DFA Raisen	(India) Param Ashwar	(India) Pallavi Rawat
DKR Football Academy	(India) Gottipati Nagaraju	(India) Kodi Alekhya
HOPS	(India) Ravi Kumar Punia	(India) Khushi
FC Imphal	(India) Bebekananda Singh Pukhrambam	(India) Bhumika Devi Thingujam
Juba Sangha FC	(India) Kulbhushan Manderwal	(India) Kiran
KASA Girls FC	(India) Horen Engti	(India) Sonia Marak
Kemp	(India) Sudhakar D.	(India) Mithila Ramani
Kerala United	(India) Rajeev Raj	(India) Sharmila
Krida Prabodhini	(India) Dhiraj Mishra	(India) Rani Kadam
MGM Ambush FC	(India) Mukesh Shrivastav	(India) Soniya Sahu
Mumbai Knights	(India) Preetam Mahadik	(India) Nikita Jude
Odisha	(India) Mitchel Ivan Silva	(India) Muriel Adam
Roots	(India) Deep Mahanta Patir	(India) Rosy Thanga
Suruchi Sangha	(India) Sourav Chakraborty (India) Ranjan Bhattacherjee	(India) Jyotsna Bara

- During group stage.
- From final round.

== Group stage ==
=== Group A ===
Pos	Team	Pld	W	D	L	GF	GA	GD	Pts	Qualification
1	Juba Sangha	4	3	1	0	8	4	+4	10	Final round
2	Mumbai Knights	4	2	2	0	9	4	+5	8	Final round
3	Roots (H)	4	1	1	2	5	6	−1	4	
4	DFA Raisen	4	1	1	2	4	7	−3	4	
5	Odisha	4	0	1	3	1	6	−5	1	

Source: IFL
Rules for classification: 1) points; 2) head-to-head points; 3) head-to-head goal difference; 4) goal difference; 5) number of goals scored; 6) drawing of lots
(H) Hosts

==== Matches ====
20 March 2026	Mumbai Knights	1–1	Odisha	Bengaluru
09:00	Bhagyashree Dalvi 89'	IFL; Report	Ashwathi P. 40'	Stadium: Padukone Dravid CSE Phase 2 Attendance: 50; Referee: Ruba Devi G. Player of the Match: Ashwathi P. (Odisha)

20 March 2026	Juba Sangha	2–1	DFA Raisen	Bengaluru
15:00	Dinakshi 32'; Naketa 38'	IFL; Report	Laxmi Kumari 73'	Stadium: Padukone Dravid CSE Phase 2 Attendance: 50; Referee: Rachana Hasmukh Kamani; Player of the Match: Dinakshi (Juba Sangha)

22 March 2026	DFA Raisen	2–2	Roots	Bengaluru
09:00	Manju Kanwar 49' (pen.); Sapna 90+1'	IFL; Report	Vipanshi 7', 82'	Stadium: Padukone Dravid CSE Phase 2 Attendance: 100; Referee: Kusum Mandi; Player of the Match: Vipanshi (Roots)

22 March 2026	Juba Sangha	3–3	Mumbai Knights	Bengaluru
16:00	Vunglawmching 63'; Nidhi 80'; Ritu Devi 89'	IFL; Report	Bhagyashree Dalvi 9', 77', 90+4'	Stadium: Padukone Dravid CSE Phase 2 Attendance: 50; Referee: Sen Hangma Subba; Player of the Match: Bhagyashree Dalvi (Mumbai Knights)

24 March 2026	Roots	0–2	Juba Sangha	Bengaluru
09:00		IFL; Report	Dinakshi 15'; Kiran 39'	Stadium: Padukone Dravid CSE Phase 2 Attendance: 75; Referee: Snigdha Mondal; Player of the Match: Dinakshi (Juba Sangha)

24 March 2026	Odisha	0–1	DFA Raisen	Bengaluru
15:00		IFL; Report	Soni Munda 47'	Stadium: Padukone Dravid CSE Phase 2 Attendance: 50; Referee: Rachana Hasmukh Kamani; Player of the Match: Soni Munda (DFA Raisen)

26 March 2026	Odisha	0–1	Juba Sangha	Bengaluru
09:00		IFL; Report	Kiran 90+3'	Stadium: Padukone Dravid CSE Phase 2 Attendance: 50; Referee: Ruba Devi G. Player of the Match: Monisha D. (Odisha)

26 March 2026	Mumbai Knights	2–0	Roots	Bengaluru
15:00	Jahnavi Shetty 8'; Diti Kanungo 90+5'	IFL; Report		Stadium: Padukone Dravid CSE Phase 2 Attendance: 50; Referee: Sen Hangma Subba; Player of the Match: Diti Kanungo (Mumbai Knights)

28 March 2026	DFA Raisen	0–3	Mumbai Knights	Bengaluru
09:00		IFL; Report	Nishka Parkash 51'; Bhagyashree Dalvi 80'; Sanvi Chaubey 90+3'	Stadium: Padukone Dravid CSE Phase 2 Attendance: 50; Referee: Sayani Roy; Player of the Match: Nishka Parkash (Mumbai Knights)

28 March 2026	Roots	3–0	Odisha	Bengaluru
16:00	Rosy Thanga 56', 74'; Thounaojam Martina Devi 90+3'	IFL; Report		Stadium: Padukone Dravid CSE Phase 2 Attendance: 25; Referee: Snigdha Mondal; Player of the Match: Rosy Thanga (Roots)

=== Group B ===
Pos	Team	Pld	W	D	L	GF	GA	GD	Pts	Qualification
1	HOPS	4	4	0	0	6	1	+5	12	Final round
2	Krida Prabodhini	4	3	0	1	14	2	+12	9	Final round
3	KASA Girls	4	2	0	2	12	6	+6	6	
4	Kerala United (H)	4	0	1	3	1	13	−12	1	
5	DKR	4	0	1	3	1	12	−11	1	

Source: IFL
Rules for classification: 1) points; 2) head-to-head points; 3) head-to-head goal difference; 4) goal difference; 5) number of goals scored; 6) drawing of lots
(H) Hosts

==== Matches ====
22 March 2026	HOPS	1–0	KASA Girls	Thrissur
09:00	Muskan 8'	IFL; Report		Stadium: Corporation Stadium; Attendance: 50; Referee: Pooja S. Player of the Match: Muskan (HOPS)

22 March 2026	DKR	0–6	Krida Prabodhini	Thrissur
16:00		IFL	Simran Gurung 27', 89'; Sumaiyya Shaikh 35', 47'; Ngashepam Pinku Devi 64'; Namram Lamnganbi Chanu 90+3'	Stadium: Corporation Stadium; Attendance: 50; Referee: Mahi Tudu; Player of the Match: Sumaiyya Shaikh (Krida Prabodhini)

24 March 2026	Krida Prabodhini	4–0	Kerala United	Thrissur
09:00	Simran Gurung 8', 38'; Payal Kothari 15'; Himani Rawat 87'	IFL; Report		Stadium: Corporation Stadium; Attendance: 30; Referee: Bishnupriya Das; Player of the Match: Simran Gurung (Krida Prabodhini)

24 March 2026	DKR	0–1	HOPS	Thrissur
16:00		IFL; Report	Muskan 87'	Stadium: Corporation Stadium; Attendance: 80; Referee: RD Hringnidam; Player of the Match: Muskan (HOPS)

26 March 2026	Kerala United	0–0	DKR	Thrissur
09:00		IFL; Report		Stadium: Corporation Stadium; Attendance: 30; Referee: Pooja S. Player of the Match: Jyoti Jagat (DKR)

26 March 2026	KASA Girls	0–3	Krida Prabodhini	Thrissur
16:00		IFL; Report	Ngashepam Pinku Devi 26'; Simran Gurung 60'; Sumaiyya Shaikh 62'	Stadium: Corporation Stadium; Attendance: 50; Referee: Rajashri Hansda; Player of the Match: Ngasepam Pinku Devi (Krida Prabodhini)

28 March 2026	KASA Girls	5–1	DKR	Thrissur
09:00	Maidangshri Narzary 5', 44', 58', 70'; Mothe Anjali 36' (o.g.)	IFL; Report	Kodi Alekhya 42'	Stadium: Corporation Stadium; Attendance: 50; Referee: Bishnupriya Das; Player of the Match: Maidangshri Narzary (KASA Girls)

28 March 2026	HOPS	2–0	Kerala United	Thrissur
16:00	Muskan 43'; Reena Kumari 58'	IFL; Report		Stadium: Corporation Stadium; Attendance: 80; Referee: Mahi Tudu; Player of the Match: Muskan (HOPS)

30 March 2026	Krida Prabodhini	1–2	HOPS	Thrissur
09:00	Simran Gurung 4'	IFL; Report	Khushbu 27'; Rani Kadam 73' (o.g.)	Stadium: Corporation Stadium; Attendance: 30; Referee: RD Hringnidam; Player of the Match: Khushbu (HOPS)

30 March 2026	Kerala United	1–7	KASA Girls	Thrissur
16:00	Dhatchana 85'	IFL	Puja Pachi 3', 29', 46', 63', 73', 90+4'; Maidangshri Narzary 18'	Stadium: Corporation Stadium; Attendance: 50; Referee: Rajashri Hansda; Player of the Match: Puja Pachi (KASA Girls)

=== Group C ===
Pos	Team	Pld	W	D	L	GF	GA	GD	Pts	Qualification
1	Kemp (H)	3	2	1	0	9	1	+8	7	Final round
2	Suruchi Sangha	3	2	0	1	13	1	+12	6	Final round
3	Imphal	3	1	1	1	10	3	+7	4	
4	MGM Ambush	3	0	0	3	1	28	−27	0	

Source: IFL
Rules for classification: 1) points; 2) head-to-head points; 3) head-to-head goal difference; 4) goal difference; 5) number of goals scored; 6) drawing of lots
(H) Hosts

==== Matches ====
25 March 2026	Imphal	9–1	MGM Ambush	Bengaluru
09:00	Herina Basumatary 7'; Chingangbam Binomala Chanu 10'; Phanjoubam Abema Devi 20'; Leihaorungbam Sanathoi Devi 36'; Athokpam Luxmi Devi 56'; Thongam Reshma Devi 58', 63', 89'; Sorokhaibam Silky Devi 86'	IFL; Report	Janvi Sahu 80'	Stadium: Padukone Dravid CSE Phase 2 Attendance: 50; Referee: Sayani Roy; Player of the Match: Chingangbam Binomala Chanu (Imphal)

25 March 2026	Kemp	1–0	Suruchi Sangha	Bengaluru
15:00	Vyasapuram Nandini 74'	IFL; Report		Stadium: Padukone Dravid CSE Phase 2 Attendance: 75; Referee: Neetu Rana; Player of the Match: Vyasapuram Nandini (Kemp)

27 March 2026	Suruchi Sangha	1–0	Imphal	Bengaluru
09:00	Kumkum Saren 74'	IFL; Report		Stadium: Padukone Dravid CSE Phase 2 Attendance: 60; Referee: Neetu Rana; Player of the Match: Kumkum Saren (Suruchi Sangha)

27 March 2026	MGM Ambush	0–7	Kemp	Bengaluru
15:00		IFL	Marakkadharshi 34', 45'; Khushbu Saroj 48', 56', 65'; Tanvi Nair 52', 63'	Stadium: Padukone Dravid CSE Phase 2 Attendance: 50; Referee: Kusum Mandi; Player of the Match: Khushbu Saroj (Kemp)

29 March 2026	MGM Ambush	0–12	Suruchi Sangha	Bengaluru
09:00		IFL; Report	Roshni Tigga 10', 50', 69', 78', 84', 90'; Sanjana Oraon 24', 26'; Roshni Baskey 82', 90+2'; Tulsi Hembram 83', 87'	Stadium: Padukone Dravid CSE Phase 2 Attendance: 50; Referee: Ruba Devi G. Player of the Match: Roshni Tigga (Suruchi Sangha)

29 March 2026	Imphal	1–1	Kemp	Bengaluru
16:00	Phanjoubam Abema Devi 67'	IFL; Report	Amisha Baxla 79'	Stadium: Padukone Dravid CSE Phase 2 Attendance: 150; Referee: Neetu Rana; Player of the Match: Thingujam Bhumika Devi (Imphal)

== Final round ==
=== Standings ===
Pos	Team	Pld	W	D	L	GF	GA	GD	Pts	Promotion
1	HOPS (C, P)	5	5	0	0	8	0	+8	15	Promotion to Indian Women's League
2	Juba Sangha (P)	5	4	0	1	15	5	+10	12	Promotion to Indian Women's League
3	Kemp (H)	5	3	0	2	9	6	+3	9	
4	Krida Prabodhini	5	2	0	3	9	12	−3	6	
5	Mumbai Knights	5	1	0	4	3	9	−6	3	
6	Suruchi Sangha	5	0	0	5	3	15	−12	0	

Source: IFL
Rules for classification: 1) points; 2) head-to-head points; 3) head-to-head goal difference; 4) goal difference; 5) number of goals scored; 6) drawing of lots
(C) Champions; (H) Hosts; (P) Promoted

=== Matches ===
2 May 2026	Kemp	1–3	Juba Sangha	Bengaluru
09:00	Ramji 55'	IFL; Report	Nidhi 8'; Vipanshi 24', 43'	Stadium: Padukone Dravid CSE Phase 2 Attendance: 50; Referee: Rajashri Hansda

2 May 2026	Mumbai Knights	2–1	Suruchi Sangha	Bengaluru
16:00	Diti Kanungo 42'; Nishka Parkash 45+3'	IFL; Report	Roshni Tigga 73'	Stadium: Padukone Dravid CSE Phase 2 Attendance: 20; Referee: Sen Hangma Subba; Player of the Match: Nishka Parkash (Mumbai Knights)

2 May 2026	HOPS	3–0	Krida Prabodhini	Bengaluru
20:00	Nandini Balla 38' (o.g.); Santosh 50'; Reena Kumari 72'	IFL; Report		Stadium: Padukone Dravid CSE Phase 2 Attendance: 20; Referee: Dheeraj Srinivas; Player of the Match: Santosh (HOPS)

4 May 2026	Juba Sangha	5–2	Krida Prabodhini	Bengaluru
09:00	Nidhi 13', 19', 45+1'; Vipanshi 36', 89'	IFL; Report	Purva Gaikwad 83'; Sumaiyya Shaikh 90+5'	Stadium: Padukone Dravid CSE Phase 2 Attendance: 15; Referee: Sayani Roy; Player of the Match: Nidhi (Juba Sangha)

4 May 2026	HOPS	2–0	Mumbai Knights	Bengaluru
16:00	Santosh 47', 64'	IFL; Report		Stadium: Padukone Dravid CSE Phase 2 Attendance: 50; Referee: Rd Hringnidam

4 May 2026	Kemp	2–0	Suruchi Sangha	Bengaluru
20:00	Anusha Mandala 1'; Sabara Khatun 90+1'	IFL; Report		Stadium: Padukone Dravid CSE Phase 2 Attendance: 50; Referee: R. Kannan; Player of the Match: Vyasapuram Nandini (Kemp)

6 May 2026	Krida Prabodhini	1–3	Kemp	Bengaluru
09:00	Gurung 11'	IFL; Report	Vyasapuram Nandini 29'; Monisha D. 45+1'; Rebecca Zamthianmawi 62'	Stadium: Padukone Dravid CSE Phase 2 Attendance: 40; Referee: Sathish R.

6 May 2026	Suruchi Sangha	0–1	HOPS	Bengaluru
16:00		IFL; Report	Santosh 28'	Stadium: Padukone Dravid CSE Phase 2 Attendance: 10; Referee: Sen Hangma Subba; Player of the Match: Santosh (HOPS)

6 May 2026	Juba Sangha	1–0	Mumbai Knights	Bengaluru
20:00	Poonam 71'	IFL; Report		Stadium: Padukone Dravid CSE Phase 2 Attendance: 15; Referee: Rajashri Hansda; Player of the Match: Poonam (Juba Sangha)

8 May 2026	Suruchi Sangha	1–6	Juba Sangha	Bengaluru
09:00	Roshni Baskey 25'	IFL; Report	Kiran 16', 90+5'; Nidhi 21'; Vipanshi 40', 48', 60'	Stadium: Padukone Dravid CSE Phase 2 Attendance: 10; Referee: Rd Hringnidam; Player of the Match: Vipanshi (Juba Sangha)

8 May 2026	Mumbai Knights	0–2	Krida Prabodhini	Bengaluru
16:00		IFL; Report	Simran Gurung 34'; Sumaiyya Shaikh 37'	Stadium: Padukone Dravid CSE Phase 2 Attendance: 15; Referee: Dheeraj Srinivas

8 May 2026	HOPS	1–0	Kemp	Bengaluru
20:00	Shailja 28'	IFL; Report		Stadium: Padukone Dravid CSE Phase 2 Attendance: 40; Referee: Sayani Roy

10 May 2026	Krida Prabodhini	4–1	Suruchi Sangha	Bengaluru
09:00	Ngashepam Pinku Devi 10'; Sumaiyya Shaikh 44', 45+3'; Simran Gurung 90+1'	IFL; Report	Chandani Kumari 69'	Stadium: Padukone Dravid CSE Phase 2 Attendance: 10; Referee: Sathish R. Player of the Match: Sumaiyya Shaikh

10 May 2026	Kemp	3–1	Mumbai Knights	Bengaluru
16:00	Rebecca Zamthianmawi 27', 41'; Khushbu Saroj 63'	IFL; Report	Shreya Kaup 73'	Stadium: Padukone Dravid CSE Phase 2 Attendance: 50; Referee: R. Kannan

10 May 2026	Juba Sangha	0–1	HOPS	Bengaluru
20:00		IFL; Report	Shailja 79'	Stadium: Padukone Dravid CSE Phase 2 Attendance: 30; Referee: Rajashri Hansda

== Season statistics ==
As of 10 May 2026

=== Top scorers ===
Rank	Player	Club	Goals
1	(India) Simran Gurung	Krida Prabodhini	9
2	(India) Sumaiyya Shaikh	Krida Prabodhini	7
2	(India) Roshni Tigga	Suruchi Sangha	7
2	(India) Vipanshi	Juba Sangha	7
5	(India) Puja Pachi	KASA Girls	6
5	(India) Nidhi	Juba Sangha	6
7	(India) Bhagyashree Dalvi	Mumbai Knights	5
7	(India) Maidangshri Narzary	KASA Girls	5
9	(India) Khushbu Saroj	Kemp	4
9	(India) Kiran	Juba Sangha	4

== See also ==
- Men
  - 2025–26 Indian Super League (Tier I)
  - 2025–26 Indian Football League (Tier II)
  - 2025–26 I-League 2 (Tier III)
  - 2025–26 I-League 3 (Tier IV)
  - 2025–26 Indian State Leagues (Tier V)
  - 2025–26 AIFF Super Cup
  - 2025 Durand Cup
  - 2026 Reliance Foundation Development League
- Women
  - 2025–26 Indian Women's League (Tier I)
