= 2026–27 Indian Women's League =

Indian Women's League
- Season: 2026–27
- Dates: 13 November 2026 – 23 January 2027
- Matches: 5
- Goals: 17 (3.4 per match)
- Biggest away win: Juba Sangha 0–8 Garhwal United (21 November 2026)
- Highest scoring: Juba Sangha 0–8 Garhwal United (21 November 2026)

The 2026–27 Indian Women's League, also known as LXME Indian Women's League for sponsorship reasons, is the tenth season of the Indian Women's League, the top division women's professional football league in India. A new partnership with LXME & Capri Sports brings a reformed and more commercial viability to the league especially for Women's football in India. East Bengal are the defending champions. The entire season will be streamed LIVE on YouTube as the 2026-27 season starts on November 13, 2026.

== Changes from last season ==
Eight clubs will compete in the 10th season, with two clubs promoted from 2025–26 Indian Women's League 2 with the season starting from 13 November 2026. After holding previous season in a centralised venue format across three stadiums in West Bengal, this season features venues spread across three cities.

Promoted from Indian Women's League 2

- HOPS ▲
- Juba Sangha ▲

Relegated to Indian Women's League 2

- Sribhumi ▼
- Sesa ▼

== Clubs ==
Locations of the Indian Women's League clubs

=== Stadiums and locations ===
City	Stadium	Capacity
Kalyani	Kalyani Stadium	20,000
Jamshedpur	Tata Football Ground	
Bengaluru	TBC	TBC

Club	City	State/Region
East Bengal	Kolkata	West Bengal
Garhwal United	New Delhi	Delhi
Gokulam Kerala	Kozhikode	Kerala
HOPS	New Delhi	Delhi
Juba Sangha	New Delhi	Delhi
Kickstart	Bengaluru	Karnataka
Nita	Cuttack	Odisha
Sethu	Madurai	Tamil Nadu

=== Personnel and sponsorships ===
Team	Head coach	Captain	Kit manufacturer	Shirt sponsor
East Bengal	(India) Anthony Andrews	(India) Shilky Devi Hemam	Trak Only	Emami
Garhwal United	(India) Akshay Unni	(India) Sanfida Nongrum	Nivia	Infinix, Itel, M3M, Techno
Gokulam Kerala	(India) Raman Vijayan	(India) Baby Lalchhandami	Flyhigh	Reporter TV, Sree Gokulam
HOPS	(India) Ravi Kumar Punia	(India) Vunglawmching		
Juba Sangha	(India) Kulbhushan Manderwal	(India) Kiran		
Kickstart	(India) Raghu Kumar Muniswamy	(India) Aruna Bag	Sweat	Amagi
Nita	(India) Paromita Sit	(India) Cindy Colney	KTH	Falcon Charity Foundation
Sethu	(India) Kali Alaudeen Nisthar	(India) Malavika Prasad	Snugly Couture	Cosco, De Shayra Skinz, PRIST, SIT

== Foreign players ==
Teams allowed to register maximum of three foreign players. All three can be part of the starting lineup.

Players name in bold indicates that the player was registered during the mid-season transfer window.

Club	Player 1	Player 2	Player 3	Former player(s)
East Bengal	(Uganda) Fazila Ikwaput	(Uganda) Resty Nanziri	(Ghana) Abena Anoma Opoku	—
Garhwal United	(Ghana) Catherine Arthur	(Ghana) Elizabeth Danso	(Ghana) Ernestina Tetteh	—
Gokulam Kerala	(Malawi) Vanessa Chikupira	(Burundi) Asha Djafari	(Kenya) Phoeby Okech Owiti	—
HOPS	—	—	—	—
Juba Sangha	—	—	—	—
Kickstart	(Ghana) Holali Ativor	(Ghana) Mercy Attobrah	(Cameroon) Montah Pemboura Roukayatou	—
Nita	(Ghana) Joyce Asamoah	(Ghana) Matilda Kwao	(Ghana) Kadidja Ibrahim Teme	—
Sethu	(Ghana) Emmanuella Adzi	(Ghana) Juanita Aguadze	(Gabon) Victoire Biatholi Maimouna	—

== League table ==
Pos	Team	Pld	W	D	L	GF	GA	GD	Pts	Qualification or relegation
1	Garhwal United	2	1	0	1	9	2	+7	3	Qualification for AFC Champions League
2	Sethu	1	1	0	0	2	1	+1	3	
3	Nita	1	1	0	0	2	1	+1	3	
4	East Bengal	1	1	0	0	1	0	+1	3	
5	Juba Sangha	2	1	0	1	2	8	−6	3	
6	Kickstart	1	0	0	1	1	2	−1	0	
7	Gokulam Kerala	1	0	0	1	0	1	−1	0	Relegation to Indian Women's League 2
8	HOPS	1	0	0	1	0	2	−2	0	Relegation to Indian Women's League 2

Updated to match(es) played on 21 November 2026. Source: IFL
Rules for classification: 1) points; 2) head-to-head points; 3) head-to-head goal difference; 4) goal difference; 5) number of goals scored; 6)drawing of lots

== Results ==
=== Fixtures and results ===
Home \ Away	EAB	GWU	GOK	HOP	JBS	KST	NIT	SET
East Bengal			1–0					
Garhwal United								
Gokulam Kerala								
HOPS								
Juba Sangha		0–8		2–0				
Kickstart								1–2
Nita		2–1						
Sethu								

Updated to match(es) played on 21 November 2026. Source: IFL
Legend: Blue = home team win; Yellow = draw; Red = away team win.

=== Results by match ===
The table lists the results of the teams after each match.

Match	1	2	3	4	5	6	7	8	9	10	11	12	13	14
East Bengal	W													
Garhwal United	L	W												
Gokulam Kerala	L													
HOPS	L													
Juba Sangha	W	L												
Kickstart	L													
Nita	W													
Sethu	W													

Updated to match(es) played on 21 November 2026. Source: IFL
W = Win; D = Draw; L = Loss

=== Positions by round ===
The table lists the positions of teams after each round mentioned in official fixtures.

Team ╲ Round	1	2	3	4	5	6	7	8	9	10	11	12	13	14
East Bengal	4	4^{*}												
Garhwal United	5	1												
Gokulam Kerala	7	7^{*}												
HOPS	8	8^{*}												
Juba Sangha	1	5												
Kickstart	6	6^{*}												
Nita	3	2^{*}												
Sethu	2	3^{*}												

Updated to match(es) played on 21 November 2026. Source: IFL
= Champions; = Relegation
Notes: * indicates the team did not play during the gameweek, ^{1} includes postponed matches of Round 2

== Matches ==
- All times are in IST (UTC+5:30).

=== Round 1 ===
13 November 2026	**East Bengal**	**1–0**	**Gokulam Kerala**	Kalyani
19:00	Ikwaput 90+2'	IFL; Report		Stadium: Kalyani Stadium; Attendance: 759; Referee: Sen Hangma Subba; Player of the Match: Shreya Hooda (Gokulam Kerala)

14 November 2026	**Kickstart**	**1–2**	**Sethu**	Kalyani
19:00	Adzi 30' (o.g.)	IFL; Report	Aguadze 18', 67' (pen.)	Stadium: Kalyani Stadium; Attendance: 765; Referee: Kanika Barman; Player of the Match: Juanita Aguadze (Sethu)

16 November 2026	**Nita**	**2–1**	**Garhwal United**	Kalyani
19:00	Tetteh 47' (o.g.); Nongmeikapam 66'	IFL; Report	Kipgen 1'	Stadium: Kalyani Stadium; Attendance: 896; Referee: Pooja S Player of the Match: Sibani Devi Nongmeikapam (Nita)

17 November 2026	**Juba Sangha**	**2–0**	**HOPS**	Kalyani
19:00	Vipanshi 37', 66'	IFL; Report		Stadium: Kalyani Stadium; Attendance: 648; Referee: Kanika Barman; Player of the Match: Vipanshi (Juba Sangha)

=== Round 2 ===
19 November 2026	**Nita**	**Postponed**	**East Bengal**	Kalyani
19:00		Report		Stadium: Kalyani Stadium

20 November 2026	**Sethu**	**Postponed**	**Gokulam Kerala**	Kalyani
15:00		Report		Stadium: Kalyani Stadium

20 November 2026	**Kickstart**	**Postponed**	**HOPS**	Kalyani
19:00		Report		Stadium: Kalyani Stadium

21 November 2026	**Juba Sangha**	**0–8**	**Garhwal United**	Kalyani
19:00		IFL; Report	Danso 21', 59'; Kipgen 37'; Nongrum 44'; Pal 45+1'; Nidhi 75', 80'; Singha 90+3'	Stadium: Kalyani Stadium; Attendance: 578; Referee: Sen Hangma Subba; Player of the Match: Elizabeth Danso (Garhwal United)

=== Round 3 ===
23 November 2026	**Kickstart**	**v**	**East Bengal**	Kalyani
19:00		Report		Stadium: Kalyani Stadium

24 November 2026	**Gokulam Kerala**	**v**	**Garhwal United**	Kalyani
19:00		Report		Stadium: Kalyani Stadium

26 November 2026	**HOPS**	**v**	**Sethu**	Kalyani
19:00		Report		Stadium: Kalyani Stadium

27 November 2026	**Nita**	**v**	**Juba Sangha**	Kalyani
15:00		Report		Stadium: Kalyani Stadium

=== Round 4 ===
27 November 2026	**Garhwal United**	**v**	**East Bengal**	Kalyani
19:00		Report		Stadium: Kalyani Stadium

28 November 2026	**Kickstart**	**v**	**Gokulam Kerala**	Kalyani
19:00		Report		Stadium: Kalyani Stadium

30 November 2026	**Juba Sangha**	**v**	**Sethu**	Kalyani
19:00		Report		Stadium: Kalyani Stadium

1 December 2026	**HOPS**	**v**	**Nita**	Kalyani
19:00		Report		Stadium: Kalyani Stadium

=== Round 5 ===
3 December 2026	**East Bengal**	**v**	**Sethu**	Kalyani
19:00		Report		Stadium: Kalyani Stadium

4 December 2026	**Gokulam Kerala**	**v**	**Nita**	Kalyani
15:00		Report		Stadium: Kalyani Stadium

4 December 2026	**Juba Sangha**	**v**	**Kickstart**	Kalyani
19:00		Report		Stadium: Kalyani Stadium

5 December 2026	**Garhwal United**	**v**	**HOPS**	Kalyani
19:00		Report		Stadium: Kalyani Stadium

=== Round 6 ===
10 December 2026	**East Bengal**	**v**	**HOPS**	Jamshedpur
19:00		Report		Stadium: Tata Football Ground

11 December 2026	**Gokulam Kerala**	**v**	**Juba Sangha**	Jamshedpur
19:00		Report		Stadium: Tata Football Ground

12 December 2026	**Sethu**	**v**	**Garhwal United**	Jamshedpur
19:00		Report		Stadium: Tata Football Ground

14 December 2026	**Kickstart**	**v**	**Nita**	Jamshedpur
15:00		Report		Stadium: Tata Football Ground

=== Round 7 ===
14 December 2026	**East Bengal**	**v**	**Juba Sangha**	Jamshedpur
19:00		Report		Stadium: Tata Football Ground

15 December 2026	**Gokulam Kerala**	**v**	**HOPS**	Jamshedpur
19:00		Report		Stadium: Tata Football Ground

17 December 2026	**Kickstart**	**v**	**Garhwal United**	Jamshedpur
19:00		Report		Stadium: Tata Football Ground

18 December 2026	**Nita**	**v**	**Sethu**	Jamshedpur
15:00		Report		Stadium: Tata Football Ground

=== Round 8 ===
18 December 2026	**Gokulam Kerala**	**v**	**East Bengal**	Jamshedpur
19:00		Report		Stadium: Tata Football Ground

19 December 2026	**HOPS**	**v**	**Juba Sangha**	Jamshedpur
19:00		Report		Stadium: Tata Football Ground

21 December 2026	**Garhwal United**	**v**	**Nita**	Jamshedpur
19:00		Report		Stadium: Tata Football Ground

22 December 2026	**Sethu**	**v**	**Kickstart**	Jamshedpur
19:00		Report		Stadium: Tata Football Ground

=== Round 9 ===
24 December 2026	**Garhwal United**	**v**	**Juba Sangha**	Jamshedpur
19:00		Report		Stadium: Tata Football Ground

25 December 2026	**East Bengal**	**v**	**Nita**	Jamshedpur
15:00		Report		Stadium: Tata Football Ground

25 December 2026	**HOPS**	**v**	**Kickstart**	Jamshedpur
19:00		Report		Stadium: Tata Football Ground

26 December 2026	**Gokulam Kerala**	**v**	**Sethu**	Jamshedpur
19:00		Report		Stadium: Tata Football Ground

=== Round 10 ===
28 December 2026	**East Bengal**	**v**	**Kickstart**	Jamshedpur
19:00		Report		Stadium: Tata Football Ground

29 December 2026	**Garhwal United**	**v**	**Gokulam Kerala**	Jamshedpur
19:00		Report		Stadium: Tata Football Ground

4 January 2027	**Juba Sangha**	**v**	**Nita**	Bengaluru
19:00		Report

5 January 2027	**Sethu**	**v**	**HOPS**	Bengaluru
19:00		Report

=== Round 11 ===
7 January 2027	**East Bengal**	**v**	**Garhwal United**	Bengaluru
19:00		Report

8 January 2027	**Sethu**	**v**	**Juba Sangha**	Bengaluru
15:00		Report

8 January 2027	**Gokulam Kerala**	**v**	**Kickstart**	Bengaluru
19:00		Report

9 January 2027	**Nita**	**v**	**HOPS**	Bengaluru
19:00		Report

=== Round 12 ===
11 January 2027	**Sethu**	**v**	**East Bengal**	Bengaluru
19:00		Report

12 January 2027	**HOPS**	**v**	**Garhwal United**	Bengaluru
19:00		Report

14 January 2027	**Kickstart**	**v**	**Juba Sangha**	Bengaluru
19:00		Report

15 January 2027	**Nita**	**v**	**Gokulam Kerala**	Bengaluru
15:00		Report

=== Round 13 ===
15 January 2027	**HOPS**	**v**	**East Bengal**	Bengaluru
19:00		Report

16 January 2027	**Garhwal United**	**v**	**Sethu**	Bengaluru
19:00		Report

18 January 2027	**Juba Sangha**	**v**	**Gokulam Kerala**	Bengaluru
19:00		Report

19 January 2027	**Nita**	**v**	**Kickstart**	Bengaluru
19:00		Report

=== Round 14 ===
21 January 2027	**Juba Sangha**	**v**	**East Bengal**	Bengaluru
19:00		Report

22 January 2027	**Garhwal United**	**v**	**Kickstart**	Bengaluru
15:00		Report

22 January 2027	**HOPS**	**v**	**Gokulam Kerala**	Bengaluru
19:00		Report

23 January 2027	**Sethu**	**v**	**Nita**	Bengaluru
19:00		Report

== Season statistics ==
As of 17 November 2026

=== Top scorers ===
Rank	Player	Club	Goals
1	(Ghana) Juanita Aguadze	Sethu	2
1	(India) Lhingdeikim Kipgen	Garhwal United	2
1	(Ghana) Elizabeth Danso	Garhwal United	2
1	(India) Nidhi	Garhwal United	2
1	(India) Vipanshi	Juba Sangha	2
6	(Uganda) Fazila Ikwaput	East Bengal	1
6	(India) Deepika Pal	Garhwal United	1
6	(India) Monisha Singha	Garhwal United	1
6	(India) Sanfida Nongrum	Garhwal United	1
6	(India) Sibani Devi	Nita	1

=== Clean sheets ===
Rank	Player	Club	Clean sheets
1	(India) Panthoi Chanu	East Bengal	1
1	(India) Ribansi Jamu	Garhwal United	1
1	(India) Manisha	Juba Sangha	1

== See also ==
- **Men**
  - 2026–27 Indian Super League (Tier I)
  - 2026–27 Indian Football League (Tier II)
  - 2026–27 I-League 2 (Tier III)
  - 2026–27 I-League 3 (Tier IV)
  - 2026–27 Indian State Leagues (Tier V)
  - 2026–27 AIFF Super Cup
  - 2026 Durand Cup
- **Women**
  - 2026–27 Indian Women's League 2 (Tier II)
