= 2024–25 Indian Women's League 2 =

Indian Women's League 2
- Season: 2024–25
- Dates: 28 March – 17 May 2025
- Champions: Garhwal United (1st title)
- Promoted: Garhwal United; Sesa
- Matches: 40
- Goals: 151 (3.78 per match)
- Top goalscorer: Lhingdeikim (12 goals)

The 2024–25 Indian Women's League 2 was the second season of the Indian Women's League 2, the second tier women's football league in India.

== Qualification ==
The teams qualifying and nominated from the 2023–24 and 2024–25 Indian State Leagues will join the remaining 2023–24 Indian Women's League 2 teams for the season.

Team	State/Region	Qualifying method
2023–24 Indian Women's League 2
Casa Barwani	Madhya Pradesh	Group stage
Garhwal United	Delhi	Final round
Krida Prabodhini	Maharashtra	Group stage
Mumbai Knights	Maharashtra	Group stage
Pudhuvai Unicorns	Puducherry	Final round
SAG	Gujarat	Final round (Note: Also 2023–24 Gujarat State Women’s League champions.)
Tuem	Goa	Final round
2023–24/2024–25 Indian Women's State leagues (Note: The 2024–25 season for many states were ongoing after the nomination cut-off date or were yet to begin.)
Liberty Ladies	Puducherry	2023–24 Pondicherry Women's Football League runners-up
Roots	Karnataka	2023–24 Karnataka Women's League third place (Note: Nominated after the 2023–24 season runners-up Parikrma FC withdrew. The 2024–25 season runners-up Kemp to join IWL 2 from the 2025–26 season.)
Sesa	Goa	2024–25 Goa Women's League champions
Suruchi Sangha	West Bengal	2023–24 Calcutta Women's Football League third place (Note: Both the 2023–24 season champions and runners-up are part of Indian Women's League.)
Others
Indian Arrows Women Juniors	Karnataka	AIFF Developmental Team
Inter Kashi	Uttar Pradesh	Nominated
NorthEast United	Assam	Nominated
Tungabhadra	Andhra Pradesh	Nominated

== Teams ==
Locations of the IWL 2 teams
Group A
Group B
Group C

=== Stadiums and locations ===
Group	City	Stadium	Capacity
Group A	Mapusa	Duler Stadium	5,000
Group B	Bengaluru	PD CSE Phase 2	250
Group C	Sircaim	Sesa Academy Ground	1,000

Team	City	State
Garhwal United	New Delhi	Delhi
Pudhuvai Unicorns	Pondicherry	Puducherry
Tuem	Pernem	Goa
SAG	Gandhinagar	Gujarat
Sesa	Sanquelim	Goa
NorthEast United	Guwahati	Assam
Roots	Bengaluru	Karnataka
Suruchi Sangha	Kolkata	West Bengal
Krida Prabodhini	Pune	Maharashtra
Mumbai Knights	Mumbai	Maharashtra
Casa Barwani	Barwani	Madhya Pradesh
Liberty Ladies	Pondicherry	Puducherry
Inter Kashi	Varanasi	Uttar Pradesh
Tungabhadra	Anantapur	Andhra Pradesh
Indian Arrows Women Juniors	Bengaluru	Karnataka

== Personnel ==
Team	Head coach	Captain
Casa Barwani	(India) Deepak Chouhan	(India) Krishna Bhati
Garhwal United	(India) Akshay Unni	(India) Sanfida Nongrum
Indian Arrows Women Juniors	(Sweden) Joakim Alexandersson	(India) Julan Nongmaithem
Inter Kashi	(India) Anirban Ghosh	(India) Vaani Kalucha
Krida Prabodhini	(India) Dhiraj Mishra	(India) Rani Kadam
Liberty Ladies	(India) Sumithra Kamaraj	(India) Priyadharshini Selladurai
Mumbai Knights	(India) Preetam Mahadik	(India) Nikita Jude
NorthEast United	(India) Jeevan Jayaraj	(India) Rekha Kataki
Pudhuvai Unicorns	(India) Dinesh Kumar S.	(India) Monisha D.
Roots	(India) Anto Vinod Stephan	(India) Achom Degio
SAG	(India) Suneet Azad	(India) Naazbanu Shaikh
Sesa	(India) Sevirino Fernandes	(India) Sushmita Jadhav
Suruchi Sangha	(India) Ranjan Bhattacherjee	(India) Mou Chakraborty
Tuem	(India) Flavina Rodrigues	(India) Jossel Mascarenhas
Tungabhadra	(India) Dada Khalandar P.	(India) R. Shobha

== Group stage ==
=== Group A ===
Pos	Team	Pld	W	D	L	GF	GA	GD	Pts	Qualification
1	Garhwal United	4	4	0	0	15	0	+15	12	Final round
2	Krida Prabodhini	4	3	0	1	11	4	+7	9	Final round
3	Suruchi Sangha	4	2	0	2	6	3	+3	6	
4	SAG	4	1	0	3	4	7	−3	3	
5	Tuem (H)	4	0	0	4	0	22	−22	0	

Source: I-League
Rules for classification: 1) points; 2) head-to-head points; 3) head-to-head goal difference; 4) goal difference; 5) number of goals scored; 6) drawing of lots
(H) Hosts

==== Matches ====
28 March 2025	Krida Prabodhini	0–3	Garhwal United	Mapusa
09:00		I-League; PDF Report	Lhingdeikim Kipgen 12', 67'; Deepika Pal 78'	Stadium: Duler Stadium; Attendance: 20; Referee: RD Hringnidam

28 March 2025	SAG	0–3	Suruchi Sangha	Mapusa
16:00		I-League; PDF Report	Oinam Babita Devi 10'; Pukhrambam Mira Devi 37' (pen.); Moirangthem Ambika Devi 57'	Stadium: Duler Stadium; Attendance: 100; Referee: Salahudheen K. Player of the Match: Oinam Babita Devi (Suruchi Sangha)

30 March 2025	Suruchi Sangha	2–0	Tuem	Mapusa
09:00	Laishram Bijeiya Chanu 26'; Pukhrambam Mira Devi 90+4'	I-League; PDF Report		Stadium: Duler Stadium; Attendance: 10; Referee: Harkomal Singh Duhra; Player of the Match: Laishram Bijeiya Chanu (Suurchi Sangha)

30 March 2025	SAG	0–2	Krida Prabodhini	Mapusa
16:00		I-League; PDF Report	Sumaiyya Shaikh 56'; Sakshi Hiwale 86'	Stadium: Duler Stadium; Attendance: 75; Referee: Akash Govind

1 April 2025	Tuem	0–4	SAG	Mapusa
09:00		I-League; PDF Report	Misbabanu Sindhi 29'; Jeel Kumari Damor 39'; Manju Gundiya 53'; Malvita Mascarenhas 85' (o.g.)	Stadium: Duler Stadium; Attendance: 10; Referee: Rajendran N

1 April 2025	Garhwal United	1–0	Suruchi Sangha	Mapusa
16:00	Jhanu Roy 83' (o.g.)	I-League; PDF Report		Stadium: Duler Stadium; Attendance: 150; Referee: RD Hringnidam

3 April 2025	Garhwal United	2–0	SAG	Mapusa
09:00	Lhingdeikim Kipgen 28'; Mangpineng Khongsai 53'	I-League; PDF Report		Stadium: Duler Stadium; Attendance: 50; Referee: Harkomal Singh Duhra

3 April 2025	Krida Prabodhini	7–0	Tuem	Mapusa
16:00	Jossel Mascarenhas 35' (o.g.); Divya Pawara 45', 66', 90+2'; Sakshi Hiwale 53'; Sumaiyya Shaikh 65', 90+7'	I-League; PDF Report		Stadium: Duler Stadium; Attendance: 50; Referee: Akash Govind

5 April 2025	Suruchi Sangha	1–2	Krida Prabodhini	Mapusa
09:00	Riya Duley 89'	I-League; PDF Report	Sumaiyya Shaikh 26', 56'	Stadium: Duler Stadium; Attendance: 50; Referee: Rajendran N

5 April 2025	Tuem	0–9	Garhwal United	Mapusa
16:00		I-League; PDF Report	Sanfida Nongrum 2', 58'; Rupali Boro 6'; Lhingdeikim Kipgen 9', 54'; Fragrancy Riwan 21'; Heirangkhongjam Linda Chanu 30'; Deepika Pal 79'; Iaraplang Nongrum 88'	Stadium: Duler Stadium; Attendance: 50; Referee: Salahudheen K

=== Group B ===
Pos	Team	Pld	W	D	L	GF	GA	GD	Pts	Qualification
1	Roots (H)	4	4	0	0	6	1	+5	12	Final round
2	Indian Arrows	4	3	0	1	11	2	+9	9	Final round
3	Pudhuvai Unicorns	4	2	0	2	8	6	+2	6	
4	Inter Kashi	4	1	0	3	9	8	+1	3	
5	Casa Barwani	4	0	0	4	0	17	−17	0	

Source: I-League
Rules for classification: 1) points; 2) head-to-head points; 3) head-to-head goal difference; 4) goal difference; 5) number of goals scored; 6) drawing of lots
(H) Hosts

==== Matches ====
2 April 2025	Inter Kashi	5–0	Casa Barwani	Bengaluru
09:00	Anchal Patel 2'; Naorem Henarita Devi 22', 31'; Alisha Lyngdoh 41'; Vaani Kalucha 90'	I_League; PDF Report		Stadium: PD CSE Phase 2 Attendance: 50; Referee: Divyesh Rajnish Ule; Player of the Match: Naorem Henarita Devi (Inter Kashi)

2 April 2025	Indian Arrows	2–1	Pudhuvai Unicorns	Bengaluru
16:00	Abhista Basnett 11'; Valaina Jada Fernandes 49'	I_League; PDF Report	Keerthana M 40'	Stadium: PD CSE Phase 2 Attendance: 38; Referee: Bosco Kas; Player of the Match: Julan Nongmaithem (Indian Arrows)

4 April 2025	Pudhuvai Unicorns	0–1	Roots	Bengaluru
09:00		I_League; PDF Report	Neha Mukati 47'	Stadium: PD CSE Phase 2 Attendance: 50; Referee: Ajay Ghorui; Player of the Match: Maitreyi Palasamudram (Roots)

4 April 2025	Indian Arrows	1–0	Inter Kashi	Bengaluru
16:00	Viksit Bara 64'	I_League; PDF Report		Stadium: PD CSE Phase 2 Attendance: 50; Referee: Abhenav; Player of the Match: Viksit Bara (Indian Arrows)

7 April 2025	Roots	1–0	Indian Arrows	Bengaluru
09:00	Maibam Nandeshwori Devi 12'	I_League; PDF Report		Stadium: PD CSE Phase 2 Attendance: 40; Referee: Bosco Kas; Player of the Match: Maibam Nandeshwori Devi (Roots)

7 April 2025	Casa Barwani	0–3	Pudhuvai Unicorns	Bengaluru
16:00		I_League; PDF Report	Subashini M 13'; Keerthana M 45+1', 45+5'	Stadium: PD CSE Phase 2 Attendance: 50; Referee: Vinay Nagesh Kondamuri; Player of the Match: Keerthana M (Pudhuvai Unicorns)

9 April 2025	Casa Barwani	0–8	Indian Arrows	Bengaluru
09:00		I_League; PDF Report	Divyani Linda 13'; Shveta Rani 17'; Abhista Basnett 23'; Anushka Kumari 28', 29', 49'; Gurleen Kaur 68'; Gurnaz Kaur 88'	Stadium: PD CSE Phase 2 Attendance: 40; Referee: Abhenav; Player of the Match: Anushka Kumari (Indian Arrows)

9 April 2025	Inter Kashi	1–3	Roots	Bengaluru
16:00	Chandam Anjali Devi 80'	I_League; PDF Report	Maibam Nandeshwori Devi 18'; Aishwarya M 64'; Maitreyi Palasamudram 90+1'	Stadium: PD CSE Phase 2 Attendance: 40; Referee: Divyesh Rajnish Ule; Player of the Match: Maibam Nandeshwori Devi (Roots)

11 April 2025	Pudhuvai Unicorns	4–3	Inter Kashi	Bengaluru
09:00	Keerthana M 21', 51', 54'; Devamithra 36'	I_League; PDF Report	Clea Abigail Colaco 14'; Amrita Sharma 31'; Naorem Henarita Devi 64'	Stadium: PD CSE Phase 2 Attendance: 40; Referee: Vinay Nagesh Kondamuri; Player of the Match: Keerthana M (Pudhuvai Unicorns)

11 April 2025	Roots	1–0	Casa Barwani	Bengaluru
16:00	Ruthu Sreenandan 84'	I_League; PDF Report		Stadium: PD CSE Phase 2 Attendance: 40; Referee: Ajay Ghorui; Player of the Match: Sanjita Niroula (Roots)

=== Group C ===
Pos	Team	Pld	W	D	L	GF	GA	GD	Pts	Qualification
1	Sesa (H)	4	2	2	0	13	3	+10	8	Final round
2	Tungabhadra	4	2	1	1	9	8	+1	7	Final round
3	Mumbai Knights	4	1	3	0	8	3	+5	6	
4	Liberty Ladies	4	1	2	1	15	4	+11	5	
5	NorthEast United	4	0	0	4	1	28	−27	0	

Source: I-League
Rules for classification: 1) points; 2) head-to-head points; 3) head-to-head goal difference; 4) goal difference; 5) number of goals scored; 6) drawing of lots
(H) Hosts

==== Matches ====
30 March 2025	Tungabhadra	2–2	Mumbai Knights	Sircaim
09:00	Anwita Raghuraman 12'; Vyasapuram Nandini 51'	I-League; PDF Report	Delfiya Pereira 14'; Devika Yadav 39'	Stadium: Sesa Academy Ground; Attendance: 50; Referee: Neha M

30 March 2025	NorthEast United	0–12	Liberty Ladies	Sircaim
16:00		I-League; PDF Report	Mamata Sing 2', 8'; Sahana K 6', 32'; Singo Murmu 14', 36', 50'; Marakkadharshi 45+2', 88'; Priyadharshini Selladurai 52', 67'; Deepika Chouhan 85'	Stadium: Sesa Academy Ground; Attendance: 50; Referee: Neetu Rana

1 April 2025	Liberty Ladies	1–1	Sesa	Sircaim
09:00	Priyadharshini Selladurai 52'	I-League; PDF Report	Pushpa Parab 70'	Stadium: Sesa Academy Ground; Attendance: 25; Referee: Snigdha Mondal

1 April 2025	NorthEast United	0–4	Tungabhadra	Sircaim
16:00		I-League; PDF Report	K Durga 5'; Anwita Raghuraman 20'; Anusha Mandala 36'; Susmitha P 86'	Stadium: Sesa Academy Ground; Attendance: 20; Referee: Pooja S

3 April 2025	Sesa	7–1	NorthEast United	Sircaim
09:00	Pushpa Parab 17', 86'; Pearl Fernandes 33'; Sushmita Jadhav 39', 59'; Flani Costa 55', 90+4'	I-League; PDF Report	Doshmie Rowtia 43'	Stadium: Sesa Academy Ground; Attendance: 20; Referee: Pooja S

3 April 2025	Mumbai Knights	0–0	Liberty Ladies	Sircaim
16:00		I-League; PDF Report		Stadium: Sesa Academy Ground; Attendance: 20; Referee: Neetu Rana

5 April 2025	Mumbai Knights	5–0	NorthEast United	Sircaim
09:00	Kanchan Rawat 17'; Delfiya Pereira 34', 59', 71'; Rebecca Zamthianmawi 83'	I-League; PDF Report		Stadium: Sesa Academy Ground; Attendance: 15; Referee: Snigdha Mondal

5 April 2025	Tungabhadra	0–4	Sesa	Sircaim
16:00		I-League; PDF Report	Pushpa Parab 34', 49'; Sushmita Jadhav 37'; Aniela Barretto 86'	Stadium: Sesa Academy Ground; Attendance: 20; Referee: Neha M

7 April 2025	Liberty Ladies	2–3	Tungabhadra	Sircaim
09:00	Singo Murmu 11'; Anjana Nakulan 33'	I-League; PDF Report	Anwita Raghuraman 23'; Erukala Sai Varshitha 63'; Vyasapuram Nandini 90'	Stadium: Sesa Academy Ground; Attendance: 20; Referee: Neetu Rana

7 April 2025	Sesa	1–1	Mumbai Knights	Sircaim
16:00	Sushmita Jadhav 50'	I-League; PDF Report	Rebecca Zamthianmawi 75'	Stadium: Sesa Academy Ground; Attendance: 20; Referee: Snigdha Mondal

== Final round ==
=== Standings ===
Pos	Team	Pld	W	D	L	GF	GA	GD	Pts	Promotion
1	Garhwal United	4	4	0	0	13	1	+12	12	Promotion to Indian Women's League
2	Indian Arrows (Note: Indian Arrows were initially not eligible for promotion during the course of the league, as they are an AIFF developmental team. AIFF confirmed their promotion on 11 July 2025. The decision was later rescinded on 23 November 2025.)	4	3	0	1	11	2	+9	9	
3	Sesa	4	1	0	3	5	12	−7	3	Promotion to Indian Women's League
4	Krida Prabodhini	4	1	0	3	4	11	−7	3	
5	Roots	4	1	0	3	2	9	−7	3	
6	Tungabhadra	0	0	0	0	0	0	0	0	Withdrew

Source: I-League
Rules for classification: 1) points; 2) head-to-head points; 3) head-to-head goal difference; 4) goal difference; 5) number of goals scored; 6) drawing of lots

==== Matches ====
9 May 2025	Roots	0–2	Indian Arrows	Mapusa
16:30		I-League; PDF Report	Anushka Kumari 59'; Divyani Linda 81'	Stadium: Duler Stadium; Attendance: 100; Referee: Kanika Barman; Player of the Match: Anushka Kumari (Indian Arrows)

9 May 2025	Sesa	0–5	Garhwal United	Mapusa
20:30		I-League; PDF Report	Lhingdeikim 20', 22', 26', 64'; Simran Gurung 90+2'	Stadium: Duler Stadium; Attendance: 250; Referee: Ranjita Devi Tekcham; Player of the Match: Lhingdeikim (Garhwal United)

11 May 2025	Krida Prabodhini	1–3	Garhwal United	Mapusa
16:30	Purva Gaikwad 50'	I-League; PDF Report	Fragrancy Riwan 11'; Lhingdeikim 41'; Esther Tingjoukim 72'	Stadium: Duler Stadium; Attendance: 100; Referee: Sen Hangma Subba; Player of the Match: Esther Tingjoukim (Garhwal United)

11 May 2025	Indian Arrows	5–0	Sesa	Mapusa
20:30	Anita Dungdung 20', 44', 53', 74'; Anushka Kumari 39'	I-League; PDF Report		Stadium: Duler Stadium; Attendance: 20; Referee: Kusum Mandi; Player of the Match: Anita Dungdung (Indian Arrows)

13 May 2025	Garhwal United	2–0	Indian Arrows	Mapusa
16:30	Sanfida Nongrum 56', 68'	I-League; PDF Report		Stadium: Duler Stadium; Attendance: 200; Referee: Ruba Devi G

13 May 2025	Roots	0–3	Krida Prabodhini	Mapusa
20:30		I-League; PDF Report	Divya Pawara 74', 83'; Sumaiyya Shaikh 90'	Stadium: Duler Stadium; Attendance: 30; Referee: Neetu Rana; Player of the Match: Divya Pawara (Krida Prabodhini)

15 May 2025	Sesa	1–2	Roots	Mapusa
16:30	Pushpa Parab 6' (pen.)	I-League; PDF Report	Achom Degio 73' (pen.); Rosy Thanga 76'	Stadium: Duler Stadium; Attendance: 20; Referee: Ruba Devi G Player of the Match: Achom Degio (Roots)

15 May 2025	Indian Arrows	4–0	Krida Prabodhini	Mapusa
20:30	Valaina Fernandes 8', 21'; Anushka Kumari 45+2'; Divyani Linda 57'	I-League; PDF Report		Stadium: Duler Stadium; Attendance: 200; Referee: Kanika Barman

17 May 2025	Krida Prabodhini	0–4	Sesa	Mapusa
16:30		I-League; PDF Report	Pushpa Parab 32', 90+2'; Sushmita Jadhav 39'; Flani Costa 74'	Stadium: Duler Stadium; Attendance: 200; Referee: Ranjita Devi Tekcham; Player of the Match: Pushpa Parab (Sesa)

17 May 2025	Garhwal United	3–0	Roots	Mapusa
20:30	Lhingdeikim 44', 45+3'; Shruti Kumari 58'	I-League; PDF Report		Stadium: Duler Stadium; Attendance: 50; Referee: Sen Hangma Subba; Player of the Match: Sanfida Nongrum (Garhwal United)

== Season statistics ==
As of 17 May 2025

=== Top scorers ===
Rank	Player	Club	Goals
1	(India) Lhingdeikim	Garhwal United	12
2	(India) Pushpa Parab	Sesa	8
3	(India) Sumaiyya Shaikh	Krida Prabodhini	6
3	(India) Keerthana M	Pudhuvai Unicorns	6
3	(India) Anushka Kumari	Indian Arrows	6

== See also ==
- Women
  - 2024–25 Indian Women's League
- Men
  - 2024–25 Indian Super League
  - 2024–25 I-League
  - 2024–25 I-League 2
  - 2024–25 I-League 3
  - 2024 Durand Cup
  - 2025 Super Cup
