= 2023–24 Indian Women's League 2 =

Indian Women's League 2
- Season: 2023–24
- Dates: 22 March – 28 May 2024
- Champions: Sreebhumi (1st title)
- Promoted: Sreebhumi; Nita
- Matches: 45
- Goals: 192 (4.27 per match)
- Top goalscorer: Shruti Kumari (10 goals)

The 2023–24 Indian Women's League 2 was the first season of the Indian Women's League 2, the second tier women's football league in India.

== Format ==
The Group stage was initially to consist of the 24 teams divided into six groups of four each, in the round-robin format, with the winners of every group proceeding to the final round. The final round will constitute of a single-leg round-robin format, with the top two teams gaining promotion to the Indian Women's League. It will be held at a centralised venue.

== Qualification ==
The teams qualifying from the 2023–24 Indian State Leagues will join the remaining 2022–23 Indian Women's League teams for the inaugural IWL 2 season. In February 2024, the AIFF announced the eligibility for nominations in the IWL 2, with the member associations required to conduct a league with at least six teams with a minimum of 10 matches per team. The League Committee reviewed the nominations filed by the various State FAs and recommended the finalisation of the teams after cut-off date. 9 teams withdrew citing financial demands and inability to assemble sufficient number of players. Additional withdrawal came from Manipur Police, Kerala United and Parikrma FC. The remaining teams were joined by additional state nominations to form the 15 teams for the season.

Team	State/Region	Qualifying method
2022–23 Indian Women's League
Mumbai Knights FC	Maharashtra	Group stage
Celtic Queens FC	Puducherry	Group stage
2023–24 Indian Women's State leagues
Pudhuvai Unicorns	Puducherry	2023–24 Pondicherry Women's League champions
FC Tuem	Goa	2023–24 Goa Women's League champions
Sreebhumi FC	West Bengal	2023–24 Calcutta Women's Football League champions
Garhwal United FC	Delhi	2023–24 FD Women's League champions
MGM Ambush	Chhattisgarh	2023–24 Chhattisgarh State Women's Football League champions
Pune Krida Prabodhini	Maharashtra	2023–24 WIFA Women's Football League runner-up (Note: The champions of the 2023–24 WIFA Women's Football League, Mumbai Knights had already qualified.)
Nita FA	Odisha	2023–24 Odisha Women's League champions
City Bahadurgarh FC	Haryana	2023–24 Haryana Women's League champions
SAI FC Kokrajhar	Assam	2023–24 Assam Women's League semifinalists (Note: SAI FC Kokrajhar selected by the Assam FA, while KASA Girls FC were the 2023–24 Assam Women's League champions.)
Others
SAG FA	Gujarat	Nominated (Note: SAG FA nominated by the Gujarat FA. The 2023–24 Gujarat State Women’s League took place after the nomination cut-off date.)
AIPL FC	Bihar	Nominated
Casa Barwani SC	Madhya Pradesh	Nominated
Khad FC	Himachal Pradesh	Nominated

== Teams ==
=== Stadiums and locations ===
Locations of the IWL2 teams
Group A
Group B
Group C

Group	City	Stadium	Capacity
Group A	Kokrajhar	SAI STC Stadium	10,000
Group B	Dum Dum	Amal Dutta Krirangan	6,000
Group C	Mapusa	Duler Stadium	5,000

Team	City	State/Region
AIPL FC	Patna	Bihar
Casa Barwani SC	Barwani	Madhya Pradesh
Celtic Queens FC	Pondicherry	Puducherry
City Bahadurgarh FC	Bahadurgarh	Haryana
Garhwal United FC	Delhi	Delhi
Khad FC	Una	Himachal Pradesh
Pune Krida Prabodhini	Pune	Maharastra
MGM Ambush	Raipur	Chhattisgarh
Mumbai Knights FC	Mumbai	Maharastra
Nita FA	Cuttack	Odisha
Pudhuvai Unicorns	Pondicherry	Puducherry
SAI FC Kokrajhar	Kokrajhar	Assam
SAG FA	Gandhinagar	Gujarat
Sreebhumi FC	Kolkata	West Bengal
FC Tuem	Pernem	Goa

== Personnel ==
Team	Head coach	Captain
AIPL	(India) Arijit Sarkar	(India) Salina Kumari
Casa Barwani	(India) Shahrukh Qureshi	(India) Krishna Bhati
Celtic Queens	(India) Vivek K S	(India) Sujata Rai
City Bahadurgarh	(India) Sudharshan Singh	(India) Preety
Garhwal United	(India) Akshay Unni	(India) Thokchom Devajani Devi
Khad	(India) Renu Bala	(India) Shital Sahani
MGM Ambush	(India) Mukesh Shrivastav	(India) Nandini Nirmalkar
Mumbai Knights	(India) Preetam Mahadik	(India) Valencia Lourdina D'Mello
Nita	(India) Pratima Biswas	(India) Pipili Mohanty
Pudhuvai Unicorns	(India) Dinesh Kumar	(India) Shanmugapriya Sasikumar
Pune Krida Prabodhini	(India) Dhiraj Mishra	(India) Rani Kadam
SAI Kokrajhar	(India) Pradip Kumar Brahma	(India) Kabita Wary
SAG	(India) Kalpana Dass	(India) Shilpa Thakor
Sreebhumi	(India) Sujata Kar	(India) Mousumi Murmu
Tuem	(India) Kulsum Bi Shaikh	(India) Laura Estibeiro

== Group stage ==
=== Group A ===
Pos	Team	Pld	W	D	L	GF	GA	GD	Pts	Qualification
1	Pudhuvai Unicorns	4	3	1	0	6	3	+3	10	Final round
2	Garhwal United	4	3	0	1	20	1	+19	9	Final round
3	Mumbai Knights	4	2	1	1	10	8	+2	7	
4	SAI Kokrajhar (H)	4	1	0	3	4	14	−10	3	
5	AIPL	4	0	0	4	4	18	−14	0	

Source: I-League
Rules for classification: 1) points; 2) head-to-head points; 3) head-to-head goal difference; 4) goal difference; 5) number of goals scored; 6) drawing of lots
(H) Hosts

==== Matches ====
23 March 2024	AIPL	2–4	Mumbai Knights	Kokrajhar
09:00	Manisha Kumari 5'; Hema Munda 24'	Report	Muriel Adam 5', 11'; Nishka Parkash 55'; Bhumika Mane 61'	Stadium: SAI Stadium; Attendance: 300; Referee: Prem Narzary; Player of the Match: Bhumika Mane (Mumbai Knights)

23 March 2024	Garhwal United	0–1	Pudhuvai Unicorns	Kokrajhar
15:00		Report	Keerthana M 7'	Stadium: SAI Stadium; Attendance: 200; Referee: Chitrambada Patra; Player of the Match: Keerthana M (Pudhuvai Unicorns)

25 March 2024	Pudhuvai Unicorns	1–0	SAI Kokrajhar	Kokrajhar
09:00	Madhumathi 49'	Report		Stadium: SAI Stadium; Attendance: 200; Referee: Chitrambada Patra; Player of the Match: Madhumathi (Pudhuvai Unicorns)

25 March 2024	Garhwal United	10–0	AIPL	Kokrajhar
15:00	Shruti Kumari 11', 13', 26', 28'; Sanfida Nongrum 41', 43', 45+1'; Oinam Babita Devi 47', 84', 90+2'	Report		Stadium: SAI Stadium; Attendance: 500; Referee: Monika Jana; Player of the Match: Shruti Kumari (Garhwal United)

27 March 2024	SAI Kokrajhar	0–8	Garhwal United	Kokrajhar
09:00		Report	Raziya Khan 18', 45+1', 87'; Shruti Kumari 21', 39', 53', 73'; Sanfida Nongrum 35'	Stadium: SAI Stadium; Attendance: 50; Referee: Sen Hangma Subba; Player of the Match: Shruti Kumari (Garhwal United)

27 March 2024	Mumbai Knights	2–2	Pudhuvai Unicorns	Kokrajhar
15:00	Valencia Lourdina D'mello 23'; Bhumika Mane 90+2'	Report	Madhumathi 44'; Susmitha P 73'	Stadium: SAI Stadium; Attendance: 250; Referee: Prem Narzary; Player of the Match: Valencia Lourdina D'Mello (Mumbai Knights)

29 March 2024	Mumbai Knights	0–2	Garhwal United	Kokrajhar
09:00		Report	Sanfida Nongrum 42', 44'	Stadium: SAI Stadium; Attendance: 60; Referee: Mahi Tudu; Player of the Match: Sanfida Nongrum (Garhwal United)

29 March 2024	AIPL	1–2	SAI Kokrajhar	Kokrajhar
15:00	Puja Kumari 45+3'	Report	Maidangshri Narzary 28', 45+5'	Stadium: SAI Stadium; Attendance: 500; Referee: Sen Hangma Subba; Player of the Match: Maidangshri Narzary (SAI Kokrajhar)

31 March 2024	Pudhuvai Unicorns	2–1	AIPL	Kokrajhar
09:00	Madhumathi 65'; Kaviya S 85'	Report	Puja Kumari 4'	Stadium: SAI Stadium; Attendance: 40; Referee: Mahi Tudu; Player of the Match: Madhumathi

31 March 2024	SAI Kokrajhar	2–4	Mumbai Knights	Kokrajhar
15:00	Maidangshri Narzary 18', 24'	Report	Vk Srutilakshmi Ranjish 58'; Arya More 61'; Nishka Parkash 71'; Valencia Lourdina D'mello 80'	Stadium: SAI Stadium; Attendance: 500; Referee: Sen Hangma Subba; Player of the Match: Nishka Parkash (Mumbai Knights)

=== Group B ===
Pos	Team	Pld	W	D	L	GF	GA	GD	Pts	Qualification
1	Sreebhumi (H)	4	3	1	0	21	2	+19	10	Final round
2	Nita	4	2	2	0	6	3	+3	8	Final round
3	Pune Krida Prabodhini	4	2	0	2	12	8	+4	6	
4	MGM Ambush	4	1	0	3	2	18	−16	3	
5	CASA Barwani	4	0	1	3	4	14	−10	1	

Source: I-League
Rules for classification: 1) points; 2) head-to-head points; 3) head-to-head goal difference; 4) goal difference; 5) number of goals scored; 6) drawing of lots
(H) Hosts

==== Matches ====
24 March 2024	CASA Barwani	1–1	Nita	Dum Dum
09:00	Kuni Munda 72' (pen.)	Report	Lalita Boypai 39'	Stadium: Amal Dutta Krirangan; Attendance: 200; Referee: Pooja S Player of the Match: Priya Rui Das (Nita)

24 March 2024	MGM Ambush	0–4	Pune Krida Prabhodini	Dum Dum
15:00		Report	Sanika Patil 48'; Urvi Salunkhe 76', 90+2'; Sumaiyya Shaikh 80'	Stadium: Amal Dutta Krirangan; Attendance: 50; Referee: Sahadev Muchem; Player of the Match: Urvi Salunkhe (Pune Krida Prabhodini)

26 March 2024	Pune Krida Prabhodhini	1–4	Sreebhumi	Dum Dum
08:30	Sumaiyya Shaikh 37'	Report	Sujata Mahata 35', 71'; Gita Das 45'; Rimpa Haldar 90+!'	Stadium: Amal Dutta Krirangan; Attendance: 100; Referee: Ruba Devi G Player of the Match: Sujata Mahata (Sreebhumi)

26 March 2024	MGM Ambush	2–1	CASA Barwani	Dum Dum
15:30	Nisha Bhoi 61'; Nandini Dewanagan 67'	Report	Laxmi Priya Lenka 90+4'	Stadium: Amal Dutta Krirangan; Attendance: 20; Referee: Harsha Saini; Player of the Match: Nisha Bhoi (MGM Ambush)

28 March 2024	Sreebhumi	11–0	MGM Ambush	Dum Dum
08:30	Mousumi Murmu 17' (pen.), 22' (pen.); Sujata Mahata 19', 30', 59'; Kabita Saren 43', 45', 49', 51'; Tania Kanti 62'; Mini Roy 90+1'	Report		Stadium: Amal Dutta Krirangan; Attendance: 150; Referee: RD Hringnidam; Player of the Match: Kabita Saren (Sreebhumi)

28 March 2024	Nita	3–2	Pune Krida Prabhodhini	Dum Dum
15:30	Priya Rui Das 4', 69'; Nibedita Nayak 21'	Report	Aditi Gadekar 39'; Vaishnavi Pawar 49'	Stadium: Amal Dutta Krirangan; Attendance: 20; Referee: Pooja S Player of the Match: Priya Rui Das (Nita)

30 March 2024	Nita	2–0	MGM Ambush	Dum Dum
08:30	Deblina Bhattacharjee 46'; Babita Kumari 90+1'	Report		Stadium: Amal Dutta Krirangan; Attendance: 15; Referee: Harsha Saini; Player of the Match: Babita Kumari

30 March 2024	CASA Barwani	1–6	Sreebhumi	Dum Dum
15:30	Anita Oraon 40' (o.g.)	Report	Rimpa Haldar 14', 23'; Sujata Mahata 36'; Kabita Saren 51'; Tania Kanti 65'; Anita Kumari 73'	Stadium: Amal Dutta Krirangan; Attendance: 150; Referee: Ruba Devi G Player of the Match: Rimpa Haldar (Sreebhumi)

1 April 2024	Pune Krida Prabhodhini	5–1	CASA Barwani	Dum Dum
08:30	Sumaiyya Shaikh 14', 21', 45+1', 58'; Reetika Sahani 54'	Report	Rukhsar Khanam 78'	Stadium: Amal Dutta Krirangan; Attendance: 20; Player of the Match: Sumaiyya Shaikh

1 April 2024	Sreebhumi	0–0	Nita	Dum Dum
15:30		Report		Stadium: Amal Dutta Krirangan; Attendance: 200; Referee: Pooja S Player of the Match: Sujata Mahata (Sreebhumi)

=== Group C ===
Pos	Team	Pld	W	D	L	GF	GA	GD	Pts	Qualification
1	Tuem (H)	4	4	0	0	20	3	+17	12	Qualification for Final Round
2	SAG	4	3	0	1	10	9	+1	9	Qualification for Final Round
3	Celtic Queens	4	2	0	2	10	9	+1	6	
4	Khad	4	1	0	3	5	10	−5	3	
5	City Bahadurgarh	4	0	0	4	1	15	−14	0	

Source: I-League
Rules for classification: 1) points; 2) head-to-head points; 3) head-to-head goal difference; 4) goal difference; 5) number of goals scored; 6) drawing of lots
(H) Hosts

==== Matches ====
22 March 2024	Khad	2–3	SAG	Mapusa
09:00	Riya Jasrotia 13' (pen.); Shital Sahani 15'	Report	Shilpa Thakor 3', 18'; Misbabanu Sindhi 77'	Stadium: Duler Stadium; Attendance: 100; Referee: Ajay Kumar; Player of the Match: Shilpa Thakor (SAG)

22 March 2024	Celtic Queens	3–1	City Bahadurgarh	Mapusa
16:15	Simran Gurung 10', 89'; Pemayanchen Dukpa 47'	Report	Preety 60'	Stadium: Duler Stadium; Attendance: 40; Referee: Kumari Nandita; Player of the Match: Simran Gurung (Celtic Queens)

24 March 2024	City Bahadurgarh	0–6	Tuem	Mapusa
08:30		Report	Pushpa Parab 6', 13'; Laxmi Tamang 9'; Sibani Sharma 27' (pen.); Kimberly Fernandez 64' (pen.); Fatima Braganza 89'	Stadium: Duler Stadium; Attendance: 100; Referee: Usha; Player of the Match: Sibani Sharma (Tuem)

24 March 2024	Celtic Queens	4–0	Khad	Mapusa
16:15	Amrita Sharma 45+3'; Promila 56'; Simran Gurung 89', 90+5' (pen.)	Report		Stadium: Duler Stadium; Attendance: 100; Referee: Snigdha Mondal; Player of the Match: Promila (Celtic Queens)

26 March 2024	Tuem	5–2	Celtic Queens	Mapusa
08:30	Pearl Fernandes 5'; Pushpa Parab 6', 52', 84'; Laxmi Tamang 50'	Report	Tanvi Kore 72'; Jeewanti 76'	Stadium: Duler Stadium; Attendance: 40; Referee: Ranjita Devi Tekcham; Player of the Match: Pushpa Parab (Tuem)

26 March 2024	SAG	3–0	City Bahadurgarh	Mapusa
15:30	Shilpa Thakor 1'; Bhumisha Dravid 45+2', 75'	Report		Stadium: Duler Stadium; Attendance: 100; Referee: Ajay Kumar; Player of the Match: Bhumisha Dravid (SAG)

28 March 2024	SAG	3–1	Celtic Queens	Mapusa
08:30	Shilpa Thakor 37', 44', 90+4'	Report	Promila 21'	Stadium: Duler Stadium; Attendance: 100; Referee: Kumari Nandita; Player of the Match: Shanti Odedara (SAG)

28 March 2024	Khad	0–3	Tuem	Mapusa
16:15		Report	Pearl Fernandes 43', 50'; Fatima Braganza 73'	Stadium: Duler Stadium; Attendance: 50; Referee: Snigdha Mondal; Player of the Match: Pearl Fernandes (Tuem)

30 March 2024	City Bahadurgarh	0–3	Khad	Mapusa
08:30		Report	Manju Devi 2', 69'; Shital Sahani 49'	Stadium: Duler Stadium; Attendance: 100; Referee: Usha; Player of the Match: Manju Devi (Khad)

30 March 2024	Tuem	6–1	SAG	Mapusa
16:15	Pearl Fernandes 5'; Pushpa Parab 28', 78'; Laxmi Tamang 47', 56'; Aniela Barretto 69'	Report	Shanti Odedara 90+2'	Stadium: Duler Stadium; Attendance: 200; Referee: Ranjita Devi Tekcham; Player of the Match: Pushpa Parab (Tuem)

== Final round ==
=== Standings ===
Pos	Team	Pld	W	D	L	GF	GA	GD	Pts	Qualification
1	Sreebhumi	5	3	1	1	13	5	+8	10	Promotion to Indian Women's League
2	Nita	5	3	1	1	15	7	+8	10	Promotion to Indian Women's League
3	Garhwal United	5	3	0	2	15	6	+9	9	
4	Pudhuvai Unicorns	5	2	1	2	7	5	+2	7	
5	Tuem (H)	5	1	3	1	5	4	+1	6	
6	SAG	5	0	0	5	2	30	−28	0	

Source: I-League
Rules for classification: 1) points; 2) head-to-head points; 3) head-to-head goal difference; 4) goal difference; 5) number of goals scored; 6) drawing of lots
(H) Hosts

==== Matches ====
20 May 2024	Tuem	1–1	Pudhuvai Unicorns	Mapusa
08:00	Fatima Braganza 88'	Report	Marakkadharshi 32'	Stadium: Duler Stadium; Attendance: 50; Referee: Harsha Saini; Player of the Match: Marakkadharshi (Pudhuvai Unicorns)

20 May 2024	Garhwal United	8–1	SAG	Mapusa
16:30	Raziya Khan 9'; Sanfida Nongrum 21', 29', 38'; Shruti Kumari 41'; Iaraplang Nongrum 85'; Monisha Singha 89', 90+3'	Report	Misbabanu Sindhi 5' (pen.)	Stadium: Duler Stadium; Attendance: 50; Referee: Kanika Barman; Player of the Match: Sanfida Nongrum (Garhwal United)

20 May 2024	Sreebhumi	3–1	Nita	Mapusa
20:30	Kai Rumi 2'; Rimpa Haldar 57'; Mousumi Murmu 74'	Report	Sikha Malik 70'	Stadium: Duler Stadium; Attendance: 200; Referee: Ruba Devi G Player of the Match: Mousumi Murmu (Sreebhumi)

22 May 2024	Pudhuvai Unicorns	1–2	Nita	Mapusa
08:00	Keerthana M 8'	Report	Babita Kumari 61'; Roshni Tigga 67'	Stadium: Duler Stadium; Attendance: 50; Referee: Neetu Rana; Player of the Match: Babita Kumari (Nita)

22 May 2024	Sreebhumi	1–4	Garhwal United	Mapusa
16:30	Kabita Saren 90+1'	Report	Fragrancy Riwan 45+3'; Monisha Singha 80', 85'; Esther Tingjoukim 90+3'	Stadium: Duler Stadium; Attendance: 100; Referee: Rachana Hasmukh Kamani; Player of the Match: Monisha Singha (Garhwal United)

22 May 2024	Tuem	3–0	SAG	Mapusa
20:30	Pushpa Parab 40'; Joizima Fernandes 74'; Fatima Braganza 82'	Report		Stadium: Duler Stadium; Attendance: 100; Referee: Ranjita Devi Tekcham; Player of the Match: Arpita Pednekar (Tuem)

24 May 2024	Nita	1–1	Tuem	Mapusa
08:00	Babita Kumari 64'	Report	Fatima Braganza 56'	Stadium: Duler Stadium; Attendance: 30; Referee: Ruba Devi G Player of the Match: Laxmi Tamang (Tuem)

24 May 2024	SAG	0–7	Sreebhumi	Mapusa
16:30		Report	Sonali Soren 3'; Mousumi Murmu 6', 29' (pen.), 89'; Bandana Roy 45+2'; Sujata Mahata 51'; Tania Kanti 52'	Stadium: Duler Stadium; Attendance: 200; Referee: Harsha Saini; Player of the Match: Mousumi Murmu (Sreebhumi)

24 May 2024	Pudhuvai Unicorns	1–0	Garhwal United	Mapusa
20:30	Yuvarani R 81'	Report		Stadium: Duler Stadium; Attendance: 50; Referee: Kanika Barman; Player of the Match: Yuvarani R (Pudhuvai Unicorns)

26 May 2024	Garhwal United	1–3	Nita	Mapusa
08:00	Shruti Kumari 86'	Report	Sikha Malik 57', 90'; Roshni Tigga 83'	Stadium: Duler Stadium; Attendance: 100; Referee: Ranjita Devi Tekcham; Player of the Match: Sikha Malik (Nita)

26 May 2024	SAG	0–4	Pudhuvai Unicorns	Mapusa
16:30		Report	Boya Dasari Anitha 11', 24'; Yuvarani R 39'; Pandiselvi R 90+2'	Stadium: Duler Stadium; Attendance: 50; Referee: Neetu Rana; Player of the Match: Yuvarani R (Pudhuvai Unicorns)

26 May 2024	Sreebhumi	0–0	Tuem	Mapusa
20:30		Report		Stadium: Duler Stadium; Attendance: 200; Referee: Rachana Hasmukh Kamani; Player of the Match: Laura Estibeiro (Tuem)

28 May 2024	Tuem	0–2	Garhwal United	Mapusa
08:00		Report	Monisha Singha 34'; Thiemlalnei 60'	Stadium: Duler Stadium; Attendance: 0 Referee: Kanika Barman; Player of the Match: Sanfida Nongrum (Garhwal United)

28 May 2024	Nita	8–1	SAG	Mapusa
16:30	Sikha Malik 27', 33', 80', 88'; Babita Kumari 44', 87'; Lalita Boypai 71'; Roshni Tigga 90+1'	Report	Guddi Gundiya 55'	Stadium: Duler Stadium; Attendance: 50; Referee: Ruba Devi G Player of the Match: Sikha Malik (Nita)

28 May 2024	Pudhuvai Unicorns	0–2	Sreebhumi	Mapusa
20:30		Report	Rimpa Haldar 62'; Mousumi Murmu 87'	Stadium: Duler Stadium; Attendance: 200; Referee: Ranjita Devi Tekcham; Player of the Match: Rimpa Haldar (Sreebhumi)

== See also ==
- Women
  - 2023–24 Indian Women's League
- Men
  - 2023–24 Indian Super League
  - 2023–24 I-League
  - 2023–24 I-League 2
  - 2023–24 I-League 3
  - 2023 Durand Cup
  - 2024 Super Cup
