= Anjana Thapa =

Indian footballer

Personal information
- Date of birth: 4 March 2003 (age 23)
- Place of birth: Dehradun, Uttarakhand, India
- Position: Midfielder

Team information
- Current team: Sesa
- Number: 21

Senior career*
Years	Team	Apps	(Gls)
2021–2022	Indian Arrows	6	(0)
2022	→ Modern Girls FC		
2022–2023	Mata Rukmani FC	7	(0)
2023–2024	Garhwal United	8	(0)
2024	→ Pink Panthers FC		
2024–2025	Sribhumi	2	(0)
2025	Transport United	1	(0)
2025–	Sesa		

International career
2022	India U20		
- * Club domestic league appearances and goals

Anjana Thapa (born 4 March 2003) is an Indian professional footballer from Uttarakhand, who plays as a midfielder for the Indian Women's League club Sesa. She has also represented India at the youth level internationally.

== Early life and education ==
Thapa is from Galjiwada, Dehradun, Uttarakhand. She is the daughter of Man Bahadur Thapa, a vegetable seller. Before joining Sreebhumi FC, she played for Pink Panthers FC, Garhwal United Football Club, Mata Rukmani FC (Girls), Modern Girls FC and Indian Arrows. She started playing football at the local academy in Basantvihar, Dehradun and learnt her basics under her first coach Rahul Negi of Garhwal Heroes. She did her schooling at Gorkha memorial school and was a student of Gorkha Military Inter College, Dehradun.

== Career ==
Thapa was selected for the senior India camp in Goa in September 2024 under coach Santosh Kashyap. Later, she was named among the probables for the senior India camp at Anantapur, Andhra Pradesh under chief coach Crispin Chettri, ahead of the Pink Ladies Cup in February 2025. But she could not make it to the final team. In March 2022, she was included for the Under–17 camp at Jasmshedpur for the AFC Women's Champions 2022 and later under–20 camp at Jharkhand. She played the 2022–2023 Senior Women's National Football Championship for Uttarakhand.

She played for Sreebhumi Football Club in the Indian Women's League 2024–2025. Earlier, she played in the Delhi Women's League.
