= Inter Kashi FC (women) =

Women's football club in India

Inter Kashi Women
- Full name: Inter Kashi Football Club Women
- Nickname: Vishalakshis
- Short name: IKA, IKFCW, KSHI
- Founded: 8 October 2024; 2 years ago
- Owner: RDB Group of Companies
- Chairman: Vinod Dugar
- Head coach: Anirban Ghosh
- League: Indian Women's League 2
Home colours	Away colours	Third colours

Inter Kashi FC Women, commonly referred to as Inter Kashi Women, was the women's football section of Inter Kashi FC, based in Varanasi, Uttar Pradesh. They debuted in 2024–25 season of the Indian Women's League 2, the second division of women's football league in India. It was the first women's professional club from Uttar Pradesh. The club was in collaboration with Spanish Atlético Madrid and Andorran clubs Inter Escaldes and FC Andorra. Due to financial irregularities regarding Court of Arbitration for Sport's appeal, the club has ceased its women's section after the inaugural season.

== History ==
=== Formation ===
The Inter Kashi women's football team was formed on 8th of October 2024 and has participated in their inaugural season of the Indian Women's League 2.

=== Management ===
Position	Name
Chairman	(India) Vinod Dugar
President	(India) Prithijit Das
Chief Operations Officer	(India) Bhaskar Basu

== Club captains ==
Period	Name
2024–2025	(India) Vaani Kalucha

== Records and statistics ==
=== Overview ===
Season	League			
Season	League	Tier	No. of teams	Position
2024–25	Indian Women's League 2	II	15	11

=== League statistics ===
Season	Division								Top scorer	
Season	Division	Position	P	W	D	L	GF	GA	Player	Goals
2024–25	Indian Women's League 2	11	4	1	0	3	9	8	Naorem Henarita Devi	3

=== Top scorers ===
As of 30 March 2025
Still active team players are highlighted

Top scorers record
#	Player	League	AFC	Total
1	Naorem Henarita Devi	3	—	3
2	Anchal Patel	1	—	1
2	Alisha Lyngdoh	1	—	1
2	Vaani Kalucha	1	—	1
2	Chandam Anjali Devi	1	—	1
2	Amrita Sharma	1	—	1
2	Clea Abigail Colaco	1	—	1

== Notable players ==
The following Inter Kashi players have been capped at senior/youth international level. Years in brackets indicate their spells at the club.

- (India) Chingakham Alina (2025)
- (India) Anjali Patel (2025)

== Associated clubs ==
The following clubs were associated with Inter Kashi Women:

- (Spain) Atlético Madrid
- (Andorra) Inter Club d'Escaldes
- FC Andorra
