= Monisha Singha =

Indian footballer

Personal information
- Date of birth: 13 January 2007 (age 19)
- Place of birth: West Bengal, India
- Height: 1.57 m (5 ft 2 in)
- Position: Forward

Team information
- Current team: Garhwal United
- Number: 13

Senior career*
Years	Team	Apps	(Gls)
2022–	Garhwal United		

International career^{‡}
2025–	India U20	4	(0)
2025–	India	1	(0)
- * Club domestic league appearances and goals ‡ National team caps and goals as of 2 January 2025

Monisha Singha (born 13 January 2007) is an Indian professional footballer from West Bengal, who plays as a forward for the club Garhwal United in the Indian Women's League 2 and the India women's national football team.

== Early life and career ==
She did her schooling from KVS Bairagarh in Madhya Pradesh. She is a product of Baichung Bhutia Football Schools programme.

== Career ==
Singha has represented Madhya Pradesh and Delhi in the junior and senior nationals. In May 2024, she was also part of the Delhi team that played in Group A of the 28th Senior Women's National Football Championship for Rajmata Jijabai Trophy 2023–24 at the AIFF National Centre for Excellence ground, Delhi.

Singha was selected in the 23-player Indian squad by Indian coach Joakim Alexandersson and she played the second of the two FIFA international friendlies against Maldives on 2 January at the Padukone-Dravid Centre for Sports Excellence in Bengaluru. She made her senior India debut as a substitute in the second match on 2 January. She represented India in the Pink Ladies Under 20 Youth Cup 2025 at Emirhan Sport Center in Manavgat, Turkey.

== Career statistics ==
=== International ===
As of 2 January 2025

National team	Year	Caps	Goals
India	2025	1	0
Total		1	0
