= Manisha Naik =

Indian footballer (born 2003)

Personal information
- Date of birth: 1 April 2003 (age 23)
- Place of birth: Keonjhar, Odisha, India
- Position: Forward

Team information
- Current team: Odisha
- Number: 9

Senior career*
Years	Team	Apps	(Gls)
- Sports Odisha
- Odisha Police
2024–	Odisha		

International career^{‡}
2020	India U17		
2025–	India	1	(0)
- * Club domestic league appearances and goals ‡ National team caps and goals as of 3 June 2025

Manisha Naik (born 1 April 2003) is an Indian professional footballer from Odisha, who plays as a forward for the Indian Women's League club Nita and the India national football team. She has also played for Sports Odisha and Odisha state in the domestic competitions.

== Early life ==
Naik is from Keonjhar, Odisha. She learnt her basics at the Sports Hostel, Bhubaneswar. One of her first coaches were Mamata Sawant and Geetanjali Khuntia. She is employed with Odisha Police. She now trains under Crispin Chettri.

== Career ==
=== Domestic ===
Naik started as a sub-junior player for Odisha which reached the semifinals of the sub-junior Girls National Football Championship played at Imphal, Manipur in October 2017. She played the sub Junior Nationals again at home in Cuttack and scored 10 goals as part of the Odisha team in July 2018.

One of her first medals with senior Odisha women came when they won the silver medal in the 36th National Games at Ahmedabad on 10 October 2022. She played the 28th Senior National (final round) at Kolkata in May 2024 and the 29th Senior Women National Football Championship for Odisha at Chhattisgarh in December 2024, where as part of Odisha team, she won a silver medal. In February 2025, she was also part of the Odisha team that won the silver medal in the 38th National Games at Haldwani, Uttarakhand.

In March 2020, she also represented the bronze winning Odisha state police team at the BN Mullik Memorial All India Police Football championships at Agartala, Tripura in March 2025.

=== International ===
Naik made her Senior India debut in the first of the two FIFA Women's International Friendlies against Uzbekistan played on 30 May 2025 at the Padukone-Dravid Centre for Sports Excellence stadium, Bengaluru.

She was part of the under 17 Indian women's team that won the two FIFA International Friendlies against Romania U-17 team at Turkey in February 2020.

== Career statistics ==
=== International ===
As of 3 June 2025

National team	Year	Caps	Goals
India	2025	1	0
Total		1	0
