= Indian Women's League 2 =

Indian Women's professional football league

- Organising body: Capri Sports, AIFF
- Founded: 2023; 3 years ago
- First season: 2023–24
- Country: India
- Confederation: AFC
- Number of clubs: 18
- Level on pyramid: 2
- Promotion to: Indian Women's League
- Relegation to: State leagues
- Current champions: HOPS (1st title)
- Most championships: Sribhumi; Garhwal United; HOPS (1 title each)
- Broadcaster: Sportvot
- Sponsor: Lxme
- Website: indianfootballleague.in
- Current: 2026–27 Indian Women's League 2

The Indian Women's League 2 (IWL 2), officially known as LXME Indian Women's League 2 for sponsorship reasons, is the second-tier professional women's football league in the Indian football league system. The competition was established in 2023, with its first season starting in 2024. It was launched as India’s first national second-tier professional women’s football league, positioned below the Indian Women's League.

== History ==
Original IWL 2 logo

The league was launched by All India Football Federation as India's first national women's second tier professional football league. In January 2024, the League Committee confirmed the introduction of the system of promotion and relegation of the clubs involving the IWL and IWL 2, effective from the 2024–25 season.

On 22 September 2026, the AIFF and Capri Sports entered into a 15-year partnership for the commercial development and marketing rights of the Indian Women's League (IWL) and Indian Women's League 2 (IWL 2).

== Format ==
The inaugural season constituted of 24 clubs which qualified through state leagues as well as being nominated by the Member State Associations. The Group stage consisted of the clubs which will be divided into five groups of three each and each club playing their opponents in their respective group once in a round-robin format, with the winners of every group proceeding to the Final Round. The Final Round will constitute of a single-leg round-robin format, with the top two teams gaining promotion to the Indian Women's League.

== Clubs ==
Locations of the IWL 2 teams
Group A
Group B
Group C
Group D

Team	City/Region	State
Group A
Sporting Bacaim (host)	Mumbai	Maharashtra
United Kolkata	Kolkata	West Bengal
SAG	Gandhinagar	Gujarat
Mata Rukmani Girls	Bastar	Chhattisgarh
GNDU	Amritsar	Punjab
Group B
Sports Odisha (host)	Bhubaneswar	Odisha
DKR	Nizamabad	Telangana
Narmada Valley	Mandla	Madhya Pradesh
Youth Welfare Club	Imphal	Manipur
Krida Prabodhini	Pune	Maharashtra
Group C
Jakrem (host)	South West Khasi Hills	Meghalaya
Kemp	Bengaluru	Karnataka
Mumbai Knights	Mumbai	Maharashtra
AIFF Academy	Hyderabad	Telangana
Group D
Sesa (host)	Sircaim	Goa
Rangers	New Delhi	Delhi
Zinc Football	Udaipur	Rajasthan
Misaka United	Bengaluru	Karnataka

== All time clubs ==
A total of 32 clubs have participated so far in the group stage or final round of IWL 2 since its inception from 2023, up to the current season.

=== All time clubs to play in the IWL 2 ===
Club	Location	No. of seasons	First app	Last app	Best finish
AIPL FC	Patna, Bihar	1	2023–24		5th in group stage (2023–24)
CASA Barwani SC	Barwani, Madhya Pradesh	2	2023–24	2024–25	5th in group stage (2023–24, 2024–25)
Celtic Queens FC	Pondicherry, Puducherry	1	2023–24		4th in group stage (2023–24)
City Bahadurgarh FC	Bahadurgarh, Haryana	1	2023–24		4th in group stage (2023–24)
DFA Raisen	Raisen, Madhya Pradesh	1	2025–26		4th in group stage (2025–26)
DKR FA	Nizamabad, Telangana	1	2025–26		5th in group stage (2025–26)
Garhwal United	New Delhi, Delhi	2	2023–24	2024–25	Champions (2024–25)
HOPS	New Delhi, Delhi	1	2025–26		Champions (2025–26)
FC Imphal	Imphal, Manipur	1	2025–26		3rd in group stage (2025–26)
Indian Arrows	Bengaluru, Karnataka	1	2024–25		Runners-up (2024–25)
Inter Kashi	Varanasi, Uttar Pradesh	1	2024–25		4th in group stage (2024–25)
Juba Sangha	New Delhi, Delhi	1	2025–26		Runners-up (2025–26)
KASA Girls	Diphu, Assam	1	2025–26		3rd in group stage (2025–26)
Kemp	Bengaluru, Karnataka	1	2025–26		3rd in final round (2025–26)
Kerala United	Thrissur, Kerala	1	2025–26		4th in group stage (2025–26)
Khad FC	Una, Himachal Pradesh	1	2023–24		4th in group stage (2023–24)
Krida Prabodhini	Pune, Maharashtra	3	2023–24	2025–26	4th in final round (2024–25, 2025–26)
Liberty Ladies	Pondicherry, Puducherry	1	2024–25		4th in group stage (2024–25)
MGM Ambush	Raipur, Chhattisgarh	2	2023–24	2025–26	4th in group stage (2023–24, 2025–26)
Mumbai Knights	Mumbai, Maharashtra	3	2023–24	2025–26	5th in final round (2025–26)
Nita	Cuttack, Odisha	1	2023–24		Runners-up (2023–24)
NorthEast United	Guwahati, Assam	1	2024–25		5th in group stage (2024–25)
Odisha	Bhubaneswar, Odisha	1	2025–26		5th in group stage (2025–26)
Pudhuvai Unicorns	Pondicherry, Puducherry	2	2023–24	2024–25	4th in final round (2023–24)
Roots	Bengaluru, Karnataka	2	2024–25	2025–26	5th in final round (2024–25)
Sesa	Sanquelim, Goa	1	2024–25		3rd in final round (2024–25)
SAI Kokrajhar	Kokrajhar, Assam	1	2023–24		4th in group stage (2023–24)
Sports Authority of Gujarat	Gandhinagar, Gujarat	2	2023–24	2024–25	6th in final round (2023–24)
Sribhumi	Kolkata, West Bengal	1	2023–24		Champions (2023–24)
Suruchi Sangha	Kolkata, West Bengal	2	2024–25	2025–26	6th in final round (2025–26)
FC Tuem	Pernem, Goa	2	2023–24	2024–25	5th in final round (2023–24)
Tungabhadra	Anantapur, Andhra Pradesh	1	2024–25		2nd in group stage (2024–25)

== Sponsorship ==
In October 2026, it was announced that LXME, India's first women's investment and financial platform, would be the title sponsor for the league and hence the league would be known as Lxme Indian Women's League 2.

Period	Title sponsor	Tournament name
2023–2026	none	Indian Women's League 2
2026–present	Lxme	Lxme Indian Women's League 2

== Media coverage ==
The first three seasons of the league lacked TV broadcasting, and matches were live streamed on the official YouTube channels of AIFF and SportsKPI. In October 2026, Capri Sports joined hands with SportVot who became the digital broadcast partners for the league.

Period	TV telecast	Online streaming
2023–2026	none	YouTube
2026–present	none	Sportvot

== Champions ==
=== IWL 2 results ===
Season	Champions	Runner-up	Third place
2023–24	Sribhumi	Nita	Garhwal United
2024–25	Garhwal United	Indian Arrows	Sesa
2025–26	HOPS	Juba Sangha	Kemp

=== Performance by clubs ===
Club	Champion	Runner-up	Third place
Garhwal United	1 (2024–25)	–	1 (2023–24)
Sribhumi	1 (2023–24)	–	–
HOPS	1 (2025–26)	–	–
Nita	–	1 (2023–24)	–
Indian Arrows	–	1 (2024–25)	–
Juba Sangha	–	1 (2025–26)	–
Sesa	–	–	1 (2024–25)
Kemp	–	–	1 (2025–26)

== Records ==
=== Top scorers by season ===
Season	Player	Club	Goals
2023–24	(India) Shruti Kumari	Garhwal United	10
2024–25	(India) Lhingdeikim Kipgen	Garhwal United	12
2025–26	(India) Simran Gurung	Krida Prabodhini	9

== See also ==
- Football in India
- Women's football in India
