= Juba Sangha FC =

Indian association football club

- Full name: Juba Sangha Football Club
- Founded: 1999; 27 years ago
- Ground: Ambedkar Stadium
- Capacity: 35,000
- Owner: Tapati Deb
- Head coach: Kulbhushan Manderwal
- League: Indian Women's League
- 2025–26: IWL 2, Runners-up (Promoted)
Home colours	Away colours

Juba Sangha Football Club, is an Indian women's professional football club based in New Delhi, that competes in the Indian Women's League and the Delhi Women's League. It is affiliated with the Football Delhi.

The club focuses on promoting and developing women's football, providing opportunities in grassroots, training programs, workshops and tournaments at the local level. It has an academy named Athlead Juba Ingolstadt Academy which was officially inaugurated on 26 November 2025.

== Squad ==
As of 13 November 2026

Note: Flags indicate national team as defined under FIFA eligibility rules; some limited exceptions apply. Players may hold more than one non-FIFA nationality.

No.	Pos.	Nation	Player
1	GK	IND	Manisha
2	DF	IND	Kavita
3	DF	IND	Ritu Devi
4	DF	IND	Poonam
6	DF	IND	Naina
7	FW	IND	Vipanshi
8	MF	IND	Varsha
9	MF	IND	Kanchan
10	MF	IND	Kiran (captain)
11	FW	IND	Nisha
12	FW	IND	Manisha
13	FW	IND	Nitu
14	FW	IND	Gayatri Devi
15	FW	IND	Laxmi
16	FW	IND	Khushi
17	FW	IND	Rekha
18	FW	IND	Soniya

No.	Pos.	Nation	Player
19	MF	IND	Asha
20	MF	IND	Komal
21	GK	IND	Preeti
22	DF	IND	Sneha
23	DF	IND	Kusum
24	MF	IND	Khushbu
25	DF	IND	Samiksha
26	FW	IND	Lavanya Shukla
27	DF	IND	Vandana
28	MF	IND	Shinu
30	MF	IND	Nidhu
41	GK	IND	Soniya
99	GK	IND	Samaira Sharma

== Honours ==
=== Domestic ===
- Indian Women's League 2
  - Runners-up (1): 2025–26

=== Regional ===
- Delhi Women's League
  - Champions (1): 2025–26
  - Runners-up (1): 2024–25

== Affiliated clubs ==
- (Germany) FC Ingolstadt 04 (from 2025)
