= Anusha Mandala =

Indian football player

Personal information
- Date of birth: 4 June 2008 (age 18)
- Place of birth: Atmakur, Anantapur district, Andhra Pradesh, India
- Position: Midfielder

Team information
- Current team: Kemp
- Number: 25

Senior career*
Years	Team	Apps	(Gls)
- Kemp
2024–2025	Tungabhadra		
2025–	Kemp		
- * Club domestic league appearances and goals

Anusha Mandala (born 4 June 2008) is an Indian professional footballer from Andhra Pradesh who plays as a midfielder for the Indian Women's League 2 club Kemp.

== Early life and career ==
Mandala is from Atmakur, Anantapur district, Andhra Pradesh. She comes from a farming community. She joined Anantapur Sports Academy in 2018. She joined the Anantapur Sports Academy, a sport for development initiative of an Anantapur NGO, Rural Development Trust under Laliga Foundation in 2018. Laliga is India's first women's residential football academy in Andhra Pradesh.

== Career ==
She made her Senior India debut on 2 January 2025, in the second of the two friendlies against the Maldives at Bengaluru . In October 2023, she was selected to play for the Andhra Pradesh state junior football team. After the first game, chief coach Joakim Alexandersson made six changes in the squad and including Mandala, who played the second match as a defender to make her India debut. In October 2024, she represented Andhra Pradesh senior team in the 29th Senior Women's National Football Championship for the Rajmata Jijabai Trophy.
