= Sesa Football Academy (women) =

- Full name: Sesa Football Academy
- Short name: SFA
- Founded: 2023; 3 years ago
- Ground: Sircaim Academy Ground, Goa
- Owner: Vedanta Sports
- Head coach: Gavin Elias Araujo
- League: Indian Women's League; Goa Women's League
- Website: sesafootballacademy.in
Home colours	Away colours

Sesa Football Academy is an Indian women's professional football club from Goa. It forms the women's section of the club Sesa Football Academy and participates in Indian Women's League, the top tier of Indian women's football. They finished third in the 2024–25 edition of the second tier Indian Women's League 2 and were promoted to the top tier Indian Women's League.

== History ==
While working towards the aim of women empowerment through football, Sesa Football Academy launched the Vedanta Women's League in 2017, with the support of Goa Football Association. The league was inaugurated by then Goa Chief Minister Manohar Parrikar in the presence of eminent women's football legends. The Vedanta Women's League has since completed two seasons, with over 200 girls given an opportunity to play football. The winner of the 2018 edition, Panjim Footballers, went on to play in the Indian Women's League as the sole team from Goa.

Sesa won the top tier state league Goa Women's League in 2024–25.

== Squad ==
As of December 2025

Note: Flags indicate national team as defined under FIFA eligibility rules; some limited exceptions apply. Players may hold more than one non-FIFA nationality.

No.	Pos.	Nation	Player
2	DF	IND	Riya Sarkar
5	DF	IND	Seema Kispotta
6	MF	IND	Sulekha Kanhar
7	DF	IND	Sanjana Chhura
8	MF	IND	Simran Narvekar
10	FW	IND	Aniela Barretto
11	DF	IND	Aaroshi Govekar (captain)
13	DF	IND	Fatima Braganza
14	MF	IND	Flani Costa
15	MF	IND	Janhabi Kishan
16	MF	IND	Piyali Roy
17	MF	KEN	Berta Adhiambo Omita
18	DF	IND	Merecia Tavares
20	GK	IND	Ashika Gadekar

No.	Pos.	Nation	Player
21	MF	IND	Anjana Thapa
22	FW	IND	Laxmi Priya Lenka
23	GK	BHU	Sangita Monger
24	MF	IND	Jeewanti Bisht
25	GK	IND	Anshika
27	DF	IND	Ambruta Nayak
28	DF	IND	Sheela Singh
29	MF	IND	Sarjida Khatun
31	GK	IND	Akila
33	DF	IND	Payel Layek
34	FW	KEN	Maurine Achieng
71	GK	IND	Josline D'Souza
73	MF	IND	Arpita Pednekar

== Honours ==
=== Domestic ===
- Goa Women's League
  - Champions (1): 2024–25
