= Lhingdeikim Kipgen =

Indian football player

Lhingdeikim
Personal information
- Full name: Lhingdeikim Kipgen
- Date of birth: 23 January 2008 (age 18)
- Place of birth: Peniel Village, Churachandpur, Manipur, India
- Height: 1.50 m (4 ft 11 in)
- Position: Forward

Team information
- Current team: Garhwal United
- Number: 20

Senior career*
Years	Team	Apps	(Gls)
2019-2023	Pehlum Lamhil Lawm		
2022–2023	Eastern Sporting Union		
- Rani Laxmibai SA
2024–	Garhwal United	8	(12)

International career^{‡}
2025–	India U20	10	(1)
2025–	India	1	(4)
- * Club domestic league appearances and goals ‡ National team caps and goals as of 2 January 2025

Lhingdeikim Kipgen (23 January 2008) is an Indian professional footballer from Manipur, who plays as a forward for the club Garhwal United in the Indian Women's League 2 and the India women's national football team.

== Early life and career ==
Kipgen is from Peniel village, Tuibong TD block, Churachandpur district, Manipur, India. She started with the local club, Pehlum Lamhil Lawm. Later, she honed her skills at Baichung Bhutia Football Schools programme. She also played for Eastern Sporting Union in the 2022–23 Indian Women's League season.

She made her senior India debut in the FIFA friendlies against Maldives at the Padukone-Dravid Centre for Sports Excellence in December and January 2025. She made her debut in the second friendly and scored her first four career goals for the country on 2 January 2025. She scored twice in each half (12', 16', 56', 59'). She is selected by the Indian chief coach Crispin Chettri for the National camp at Anantapur, Andhra Pradesh, ahead of the 2025 Pink Ladies Cup, to be held at Sharjah, United Arab Emirates, from 20 to 26 February 2025. On 17 February 2025, she was named in the final squad.

== Career statistics ==
=== International ===
As of 2 January 2025

National team	Year	Caps	Goals
India	2025	1	4
Total		1	4

Scores and results list India's goal tally first.

List of international goals scored by Lhingdeikim
No.	Date	Venue	Opponent	Score	Result	Competition
1.	2 January 2025	Padukone – Dravid Centre for Sports Excellence, Bengaluru, India	Maldives	1–0	11–1	Friendly
2.	2 January 2025	Padukone – Dravid Centre for Sports Excellence, Bengaluru, India	Maldives	3–0	11–1	Friendly
3.	2 January 2025	Padukone – Dravid Centre for Sports Excellence, Bengaluru, India	Maldives	7–1	11–1	Friendly
4.	2 January 2025	Padukone – Dravid Centre for Sports Excellence, Bengaluru, India	Maldives	8–1	11–1	Friendly
