= Garhwal United FC =

Indian association football club based in Delhi

Garhwal United
- Full name: Garhwal United Football Club
- Founded: 2020; 6 years ago
- Owner: Bhagwan Singh Negi
- Head coach: Akshay Unni
- League: Indian Women's League; Delhi Women's League
- 2024–25: Champions
Home colours	Away colours

Garhwal United Football Club is an Indian women's professional football club from Delhi. It forms the women's section of the club Garhwal Heroes and participates in Indian Women's League, the top tier of Indian women's football. Their best finish in the second tier was third position in the final round in the 2023–24 season.

== History ==
Garhwal FC women's team participates in the state league of Delhi in FD Women's League, under the name Garhwal United FC. They first participated in the state league in 2020.

They finished as winners in the 2024–25 season of the Indian Women's League 2, which enabled promotion to the top tier Indian Women's League.

== Squad ==
As of 13 November 2026

Note: Flags indicate national team as defined under FIFA eligibility rules; some limited exceptions apply. Players may hold more than one non-FIFA nationality.

No.	Pos.	Nation	Player
1	GK	IND	Jyotsna Bara
2	DF	IND	Pakpi Devi Yumlembam
3	DF	GHA	Catherine Arthur
4	DF	IND	Linda Chanu Heirangkhongjam
6	DF	GHA	Ernestina Tetteh
7	MF	IND	Deepika Pal
8	MF	IND	Bonifilia Shullai
9	FW	GHA	Elizabeth Danso
10	MF	IND	Sanfida Nongrum (captain)
11	MF	IND	Lhingdeikim Kipgen
13	FW	IND	Monisha Singha
14	FW	IND	Anita Dungdung
15	MF	IND	Harmeen Kaur
16	FW	IND	Nidhi
17	FW	IND	Fragrancy Riwan

No.	Pos.	Nation	Player
18	FW	IND	Shruti Kumari
19	FW	IND	Bobita Pachi
20	MF	IND	Poonam
21	MF	IND	Aarti
22	DF	IND	Sanamija Chanu Khumukcham
23	DF	IND	Ruby Thiemlalnei Gangte
24	DF	IND	Jyoti
27	DF	IND	Alka Indwar
49	GK	IND	Ribansi Jamu
50	GK	IND	Anika Devi Sharubam
66	MF	IND	Esther Tingjoukim

== Personnel ==
=== Technical staff ===
As of December 2025

Position	Name
Head coach	(India) Akshay Unni
Assistant coach	(India) Akash Thomas
Physio	(India) Anubha Bhargava
Team manager	(India) Nithin Nair

== Honours ==
=== Domestic ===
- Indian Women's League 2
  - Champions (1): 2024–25

=== Regional ===
- Delhi Women's League
  - Champions (2): 2023–24, 2024–25
  - Runners-up (2): 2022–23, 2025–26
