= Karnataka Women's League =

- Organising body: KSFA
- Founded: January 2019; 7 years ago
- Country: India
- Number of clubs: 9
- Level on pyramid: 3–5
- Promotion to: Indian Women's League 2
- Current champions: Kickstart (7th title) (2025–26)
- Most championships: Kickstart (7 titles)
- Broadcaster(s): SportsCast India; Sports Paddock (YouTube)

The Karnataka Women's League, also referred to as the Karnataka Women's Super Division League, is the top division of women's football league in the Indian state of Karnataka. The League is organised by the Karnataka State Football Association (KSFA), the official football governing body of the state.

== League structure ==
Karnataka Women's League
Tier	Division
I _{(3 on Indian Women's Football Pyramid)}	Karnataka Women's Super Division League _{↑promote (to Indian Women's League 2) ↓relegate}
II _{(4 on Indian Women's Football Pyramid)}	Karnataka Women's A Division League _{↑promote ↓relegate}
II _{(5 on Indian Women's Football Pyramid)}	Karnataka Women's B Division League _{↑promote}

== Clubs ==
=== 2025–26 Super Division ===
Sl No.	Team Name
1.	Bengaluru
2.	Kemp
3.	Kickstart
4.	Legends de Sporting
5.	Maatru Pratishtana
6.	Misaka United
7.	Pass
8.	Pink Panthers
9.	Roots
10.	Kodagu

== Champions ==
Edition	Season	Champion	Runners-up	Ref.
1st	2019	Bangalore United FC	Indian Football Factory	
2nd	2019–20	Kickstart	Bangalore United FC	
3rd	2020–21	Kickstart	Maatru Pratishtana FC	
4th	2021–22	Kickstart	Misaka United FC	
5th	2022–23	Kickstart	Misaka United FC	
6th	2023–24	Kickstart	Parikrma FC	
7th	2024–25	Kickstart	Kemp	
8th	2025–26	Kickstart	Misaka United FC	

== See also ==
- Football in India
