= Kemp FC =

Indian women's association football team

Kemp
- Full name: Kemp Football Club
- Short name: KFC
- Founded: 2022; 4 years ago
- Ground: Various
- Owner: Kemp Excellence Foundation
- Chairman: Kathleen De Saran
- Head coach: Praveen Raju Devaraj Varalakshmi
- League: Indian Women's League 2 Karnataka Women's League
- 2024–25: Runners-up
- Website: https://www.kempfc.com/
| Home colours | Away colours |

Kemp Football Club is an Indian women's professional football club from Bengaluru, Karnataka. It plays in the Indian second tier Indian Women's League 2 and Karnataka Women's League, the top women’s league in Karnataka.

== History ==
It was established on 6 June 2022, and registered as Kemp FC LLP in December 2023. The club owned by the Kemp Excellence Foundation provides opportunities and supports young girls to pursue football at a competitive level. It is started by six parents of the players. Kathleen De Saren is the president of the club. It earned promotion to the Indian Women's League 2.

The club finished second in the 2024 edition of the Karnataka Women's League after losing on goal difference to defending champions Kickstart FC. In June 2023, they won the B Division by defeating OTB football club 4-0 in the final, and were promoted to the A Division.

On 6 February 2025, Kemp FC entered into an agreement with Tamil Nadu based Sethu FC to enhance player development. Kemp FC also runs an academy with good infrastructure and AIFF-licensed coaches.

== Squad ==
As of 20 March 2026

Note: Flags indicate national team as defined under FIFA eligibility rules; some limited exceptions apply. Players may hold more than one non-FIFA nationality.

| No. | Pos. | Nation | Player |
|---|---|---|---|
| 1 | GK | IND | Aruni Singh |
| 3 | DF | IND | Anoushka Johnson |
| 4 | FW | IND | Vyasapuram Nandini |
| 5 | MF | IND | Tara Anand |
| 6 | DF | IND | Niya Reddy |
| 7 | MF | IND | Amisha Baxla |
| 8 | MF | IND | Tanvi Nair |
| 9 | FW | IND | K. Asika |
| 10 | FW | IND | Khusbu Saroj |
| 11 | MF | IND | Rivka Ramji |
| 12 | MF | IND | Mithila Ramani |
| 14 | FW | IND | Sabara Khatun |
| 15 | MF | IND | Sunalinda Iawren |
| 16 | GK | IND | Laya Balasubramanian |

| No. | Pos. | Nation | Player |
|---|---|---|---|
| 17 | MF | IND | Neha Mukati |
| 18 | MF | IND | Marakkadharshi |
| 19 | FW | IND | Sonali Mondal |
| 20 | DF | IND | Arya Sree S. |
| 21 | MF | IND | Yuvarani R. |
| 22 | DF | IND | Mallikka Mandal |
| 23 | DF | IND | Rebecca Zamthianmawi |
| 24 | MF | IND | Avanthika Swamy |
| 25 | DF | IND | Anusha Mandala |
| 27 | FW | IND | Chinmayi Tili |
| 28 | MF | IND | Anaya Susan Thomas |
| 30 | GK | IND | Reshma M. |

== Honours ==
- Karnataka Women's League
  - Runners-up (1): 2024–25
