= Mumbai Knights FC =

Indian women's association football club based in Maharashtra

Mumbai Knights
- Full name: Mumbai Knights Football Club
- Founded: 2011; 15 years ago
- Ground: Cooperage Ground, Mumbai
- Capacity: 5,000
- Owner: Preetam Mahadik
- Head coach: Murgesh Udayar Nadar
- League: Indian Women's League 2 WIFA Women's Football League; Mumbai Women's Premier League (reserves)
Home colours	Away colours

Mumbai Knights Football Club is an Indian professional football club from Mumbai. They currently participate in the Indian Women's League 2.

== History ==
Mumbai Knights FC made their top tier debut in the Indian Women's League in 2022–23 season, getting relegated in the group stage. They got promoted to the inaugural edition of the second tier Indian Women's League 2 by winning the 2023–24 edition of the WIFA Women's Football League.

== Squad ==
As of 20 March 2026

Note: Flags indicate national team as defined under FIFA eligibility rules; some limited exceptions apply. Players may hold more than one non-FIFA nationality.

No.	Pos.	Nation	Player
1	GK	IND	Samaira Sharma
2	DF	IND	Mansi Samre
3	DF	IND	Nikita Jude (captain)
4	DF	IND	Krishita Iyer
5	DF	IND	V. K. Sruthilakshmi Ranjish
6	MF	IND	Zita Gloria
7	MF	IND	Bhagyashree Dalvi
8	MF	IND	Prisha Patel
9	FW	IND	Shreya Kaup
10	MF	IND	Divya Basantani
11	FW	IND	Nishka Parkash
13	FW	IND	Delfiya Pereira
14	MF	IND	Jahnavi Shetty
15	DF	IND	Sanam Rathod

No.	Pos.	Nation	Player
16	MF	IND	Anubhuti Pathak
17	DF	IND	Radhika Vyas
18	FW	IND	Sanvi Chaubey
19	DW	IND	Mahi Virdi
21	DF	IND	Meera Toolsidass
22	MF	IND	Diti Kanungo
23	GK	IND	Dhvani Jain
24	DF	IND	Vasty Kiphoineng Haokip
30	GK	IND	Soniya
31	GK	IND	Minakshee Bhagat
66	FW	IND	Alisha Sandeep Mehta
77	DF	IND	Sapna Jaiswar
98	DF	IND	Urvi Salunkhe

== Honours ==
- WIFA Women's Football League
  - Champions (3): 2022–23, 2023–24, 2024–25
- Mumbai Women's Football League
  - Champions (3): 2021–22, 2022–23, 2024–25
