= Maharashtra State Senior Women's Football League =

- Organising body: Western India Football Association (Maharashtra)
- Founded: 2017; 9 years ago
- Country: India
- Number of clubs: 10
- Level on pyramid: 3
- Promotion to: Indian Women's League 2
- Relegation to: District leagues
- Current champions: Krida Prabodhini (1st title) (2025–26)
- Most championships: Mumbai Knights (3 titles)

The Maharashtra State Senior Womenʼs Football League, also formerly known as WIFA Women's Football League, is the top division of women's football in the Indian state of Maharashtra. The league was first held in 2017 and is organised by the Western India Football Association (WIFA), the official football governing body of the state.

== History ==
The Maharashtra State Senior Women's Football League was founded by Western India Football Association (WIA) in 2017 to introduce women's football in Maharashtra in the lines of men's domestic football system. The league consists of teams from the women's divisions of the district football associations.

== Competition structure ==
Tier	Division
I _{(3 on Indian Women's football pyramid)}	Maharashtra State Senior Women's Football League
II _{(4 on Indian Women's football pyramid)}	District leagues (MFA Women's Premier League, PDFA Women's League and others)

== Clubs ==
=== 2024–25 season ===
The teams participating in the 2024–25 season:

Location of MSSWFL teams

No.	Team	Location
1	Aspire FC	Pune
2	Bacaim FC	Vasai
3	Dervan FC	Dervan
4	Ignite FC	Pune
5	Kenkre	Mumbai
6	Mumbai Knights	Mumbai

== Venue ==
The matches are held at Cooperage Ground.

== Champions ==
Season	Champion	Runners-up	Ref
2017	Pune City	United Poona SA	(as WIFA Women's Football Championship)
2018–19	Kolhapur City		(as WIFA IWL Maharashtra Qualifiers)
2019–20	Kenkre	Kolhapur City	
2020–21	Cancelled due to COVID-19 pandemic in India		
2021–22	PIFA Sports	S.P. Football Academy	
2022–23	Mumbai Knights	PIFA Sports	
2023–24	Mumbai Knights	Krida Prabodhini	
2024–25	Mumbai Knights	Aspire FC	
2025–26	Krida Prabodhini	SC Bacaim	
