= Sircaim =

Sircaim Sirsaim
- Village
- Location in Goa, India Sircaim (India)
- Coordinates: 15°37′18.444″N 73°54′3.24″E
- Country: India
- State: Goa
- District: North Goa

Languages
  - Official: Konkani
- Time zone: UTC+5:30 (IST)
- Telephone code: 00-91-832
- Vehicle registration: GA
- Nearest city: Mapusa
- Website: goa.gov.in

Sircaim (or Sirsaim) is a village situated in the Bardez sub-district or taluka of Goa, which lies along the west-coast of India. It lies close to or within the mining belt of North Goa. It is home to a football academy for youth, and a jetty for iron-ore transportation. Though located in Bardez, it has also been involved in mining activities which are otherwise mainly based in Bicholim and other sub-districts of Goa.

== Area and population ==
It has an area of 377 hectares, and 713 households. Its population of 2,850 comprises 1,442 males and 1,408 females. In the 0-6 age group, it has a population of 217 children, of whom 117 are male and 100 are female.

== Literacy ==
Of its population 2,422 are literate (1,254 males and 1,168 females), according to the 2011 Census.

== Sircaim jetty ==
Sircaim is home to a jetty, from which one mining company - describing itself as a trader (in ore) -- had some 10,117 metric tonnes of ore at Sircaim in May 2018, around the time when curbs on the processing and exporting of iron ore from Goa were in place due to governmental and court restrictions. This issue came up when the High Court of Bombay at Goa declined to grant relief to mining companies and traders who were seeking a modification of the court's interim order stopping the transportation of privately mined ore in Goa.

Among the companies operationation at Sircaim were ILPL, the Formento Mining-linked Infrastructure Logistics Private Limited, and NRB (NRB Group founded by Narayan R Bandekar), both connected with the jetty.

== Industrial plans ==
In December 2012, the Government of Goa announced plans for a new industrial estate at Sircaim spread over an area of 835,000 square metres, together with new such estates in Tuem (phase III and IV), Sancoale (phase IV), Poinguinim in Canacona and Latambarcem in Bicholim.

== Church ==
The Our Lady of Miracles Church is located in Sircaim.

== Banks ==
It has branches of the HDFC Bank and the State Bank of India in the village.

== Post office ==
Sircaim has its post office (a branch office), under the PIN code of 403502. It is a non-delivery office, coming under the nearby postal taluk of Bicholim, within the Goa postal division, the Goa-Panaji postal region and the Maharashtra postal circle.

== Football academy ==
Sircaim is home to one of the two Sesa Football Academy premises in Goa, the other being at Sanquelim. The Sesa Football Academy Ground is at Sircaim.
