= 2026 SAFF Women's Championship final =

- Event: 2026 SAFF Women's Championship
Bangladesh	India
(Bangladesh)	(India)
1	3
- Date: 6 June 2026
- Venue: Jawaharlal Nehru Stadium, Margao
- Referee: Anjana Rai (Nepal)
- Attendance: 729

The 2026 SAFF Women's Championship final was the final match of the 2026 SAFF Women's Championship. It took place on 6 June 2026 at Margao, Goa. It was announced that the matches during the tournament, including the final, would take place at the Fatorda Stadium. Defending champions Bangladesh and hosts India qualified for the final match after defeating Nepal and Bhutan respectively in the semi-finals.

India clinched their sixth SAFF Women's Championship title last winning the title in the 2019 edition.

== Venue ==
The final was played at Jawaharlal Nehru Stadium, Margao, Goa.

Margao	2026 SAFF Women's Championship final (India)
Jawaharlal Nehru Stadium	2026 SAFF Women's Championship final (India)
Capacity: 16,200	2026 SAFF Women's Championship final (India)
Margao Stadium outside image	2026 SAFF Women's Championship final (India)

== Route to the final ==
Bangladesh started their campaign in Group B with a 4–2 victory over the Maldives. However, in their final group stage match, they suffered a 3–0 defeat against the hosts, India. In the semi-finals, Bangladesh faced Group A winners Nepal and secured a dramatic 2–1 victory to advance to the final.

The hosts, India, had a dominant run in Group B, beginning their campaign with a resounding 11–0 win against the Maldives, where Aveka Singh scored four goals. They followed it up with a 3–0 clean-sheet victory over Bangladesh to finish at the top of their group. In the semi-finals, India locked horns with Bhutan and earned a narrow 1–0 victory to seal their place in the final.

Bangladesh
Round
India
Opponent
Result
Group stage
Opponent
Result
Maldives
4–2
Match 1
Maldives
11–0
India
0–3
Match 2
Bangladesh
3–0

Team	Pld	W	D	L	GF	GA	GD	Pts
India	2	2	0	0	14	0	+14	6
Bangladesh	2	1	0	1	4	5	−1	3
Maldives	2	0	0	2	2	15	−13	0

Final standings

Team	Pld	W	D	L	GF	GA	GD	Pts
India	2	2	0	0	14	0	+14	6
Bangladesh	2	1	0	1	4	5	−1	3
Maldives	2	0	0	2	2	15	−13	0

Opponent
Result
Knockout stage
Opponent
Result
Nepal
2–1
Semi-finals
Bhutan
1–0

== Match ==
6 June 2026
18:30

Bangladesh	1–3	India
R. Chakma 45+2'	Report	Xaxa 42'; Nongrum 46'; Kom 82'

Jawaharlal Nehru Stadium, Margao
Attendance: 729
Referee: Anjana Rai (Nepal)

Bangladesh	India

BANGLADESH:
GK	23	Mile Akter
MF	8	Maria Manda (c)
DF	3	Shamsunnahar Sr.
DF	4	Afeida Khandaker
DF	5	Kohati Kisku
MF	6	Momita Khatun	(substituted off) 90+1'
MF	9	Anika Rania	(substituted off) 60'
FW	10	Tohura Khatun	(substituted off) 72'
DF	13	Surovi Akter
FW	17	Ritu Porna Chakma
FW	20	Shamsunnahar Jr.	(substituted off) 90+1'
Substitutes:
GK	1	Rupna Chakma
DF	2	Sheuli Azim
MF	7	Monika Chakma	(substituted on) 60'
MF	11	Umehla Marma	(substituted on) 90+1'
FW	12	Sauravi Akanda
MF	14	Halima Akther
MF	15	Arpita Biswas
DF	16	Unnati Khatun
FW	18	Shaheda Ripa	(substituted on) 90+1'
FW	19	Mst Sagorika	(substituted on) 72'
GK	21	Surma Jannat
DF	22	Swarna Rani Mandal
Manager:
(England) Peter Butler

INDIA:
GK	1	Panthoi Chanu
MF	6	Sangita Basfore (c)	(substituted off) 88'
DF	3	Nirmala Devi
DF	4	Shilky Devi
DF	5	Juli Kishan
FW	8	Sanfida Nongrum
DF	9	Astam Oraon
FW	10	Pyari Xaxa	(substituted off) 85'
MF	16	Manisha Kalyan	(substituted off) 71'
MF	18	Jasoda Munda
FW	19	Aveka Singh	(substituted off) 46'
Substitutes:
DF	2	Purnima Kumari
MF	7	Soumya Guguloth	(substituted on) 88'
FW	11	Grace Dangmei	(substituted on) 85'
FW	12	Lynda Kom	(substituted on) 71'
GK	13	Shreya Hooda
DF	14	Ranjana Chanu
MF	15	Priyangka Devi
FW	17	Karishma Shirvoikar
FW	20	Thoibisana Chanu
MF	21	Sarita Yumnam
MF	22	Malavika Prasad	(substituted on) 46'
FW	23	Ribansi Jamu
Manager:
(India) Crispin Chhetri

Assistant referees:
Choden Tshering (Bhutan)
Dhimal Merina (Nepal)
Fourth official:
Minisarani Yapa Y.A.P. (Sri Lanka)
Match commissioner:
Subha Rahman (Bangladesh)
Referee assessor:
Maria Rebello (India)

Match rules

- 90 minutes
- 30 minutes of extra time if necessary
- Penalty shoot-out if scores still level
- Maximum of fifteen named substitutes
- Maximum of five substitutions, with a sixth allowed in extra time
- Maximum of one concussion substitution

== See also ==
- 2026 SAFF Women's Championship
- 2026 SAFF Championship
- 2026 SAFF Championship final
- 2026 SAFF U-17 Championship
- 2026 SAFF U-17 Women's Championship
