= India women's national football team results (2020–present) =

This article shows the results of India women's national football team from the 2020s.

Legend Win Draw Loss

Only Senior A international matches are listed here.

== 2021 ==
| 19 February Turkish Women's Cup | Russia | 8–0 | India | Kargıcak, Turkey |
| | Morina 3', 40'; Chernomyrdina 15' (pen.); Sheina 42'; Korovkina 46', 56', 62'; Maibam 84' (o.g.) | Report; GSA | | Stadium: Gold City Sports Complex |

| 23 February Turkish Women's Cup | India | 2–3 | Ukraine | Kargıcak, Turkey |
| | Xaxa 14'; Kalyan 26' | Report GSA | Kozlova 42'; Apanashchenko 62' (pen.), 90+3' | Stadium: Gold City Sports Complex |

| 5 April Friendly | Uzbekistan | 1–0 | India | Olmaliq, Uzbekistan |
| | Shoyimova 87' | Report; GSA | | Stadium: AGMK Stadium; Attendance: 57; Referee: Asker Nadjafaliyev (Uzbekistan) |

| 8 April Friendly | India | 1–2 | Belarus | Olmaliq, Uzbekistan |
| | Basfore 90+6' | Report; GSA | Shuppo 68' (pen.); Pilipenko 77' | Stadium: AGMK Stadium; Attendance: 150; Referee: Rustam Lutfullin (Uzbekistan) |

| 2 October Friendly | United Arab Emirates | 1–4 | India | Dubai, United Arab Emirates |
| 21:30 IST | Rashid 50' | Report; GSA | Kalyan 20'; Xaxa 27'; Nganbam 41'; Tamang 75' | Stadium: Theyab Awana Stadium; Referee: Omar Mohamed Al Ali (United Arab Emirates) |

| 4 October Friendly | Tunisia | 1–0 | India | Dubai, United Arab Emirates |
| 21:30 IST | Houij 8' | Report; GSA | | Stadium: Theyab Awana Stadium; Referee: Khuloud Khudoum Al Zaabi (United Arab Emirates) |

| 10 October Friendly | Bahrain | 0–5 | India | Hamad Town, Bahrain |
| 20:30 IST | | Report; GSA | Basfore 13'; Xaxa 19', 68'; Indumathi 34'; Kalyan 69' | Stadium: Hamad Town Stadium; Attendance: 20; Referee: Ahmed Khalil Bahrain) |

| 13 October Friendly | India | 1–0 | Chinese Taipei | Hamad Town, Bahrain |
| 21:30 IST | Gour 3' | Report; GSA | | Stadium: Hamad Town Stadium; Referee: Mohammed Ebrahim Marshad (Bahrain) |

| 25 November Int. Football Tournament of Manaus | Brazil | 6–1 | India | Manaus, Brazil |
| 21:00 (UTC−04:00) | Debinha 1'; Queiroz 37'; Borges 52', 81'; Ferraz 54'; Ferreira 76' | Report; GSA | Kalyan 8' | Stadium: Arena da Amazônia; Attendance: 3,194; Referee: Daiane Caroline Muniz dos Santos (Brazil) |

| 28 November Int. Football Tournament of Manaus | India | 0–3 | Chile | Manaus, Brazil |
| 17:00 (UTC−04:00) | | Report; GSA | Urrutia 13'; Hernández 84'; Araya 85' | Stadium: Arena da Amazônia; Referee: Rejane Caetano da Silva (Brazil) |

| 1 December Int. Football Tournament of Manaus | Venezuela | 2–1 | India | Manaus, Brazil |
| 17:00 (UTC−04:00) | Speckmaier 50'; Olivieri 81' | Report; GSA | Dangmei 18' | Stadium: Arena da Amazônia; Referee: Thayslane de Melo Costa (Brazil) |

== 2022 ==
| 20 January AFC Asian Cup GS | India | 0–0 (Voided) | Iran | Navi Mumbai, India |
| 19:30 UTC+5:30 | | Report | | Stadium: DY Patil Stadium; Referee: Lara Lee (Australia) |

| 23 January AFC Asian Cup GS | Chinese Taipei | Cancelled | India | Navi Mumbai, India |
| 19:30 UTC+5:30 | | Report | | Stadium: DY Patil Stadium |

| 26 January AFC Asian Cup GS | India | Cancelled | China | Mumbai, India |
| 19:30 UTC+5:30 | | Report | | Stadium: Mumbai Football Arena |

| 5 April Friendly | India | 1–0 | Egypt | Zarqa, Jordan |
| 22:00 UTC+3 | Naorem 32' | Report | | Stadium: Prince Mohammed Stadium; Attendance: 100; Referee: Haneen Murad (Jordan) |

| 8 April Friendly | Jordan | 0–1 | India | Zarqa, Jordan |
| 22:30 UTC+3 | | Report | Kalyan 48' | Stadium: Prince Mohammed Stadium; Attendance: 350; Referee: Osama Hasan (Jordan) |

| 7 September 2022 SAFF W GS | India | 3–0 | Pakistan | Kathmandu, Nepal |
| 13:00 UTC+5:45 | Khan 21' (o.g.); Dangmei 23'; Guguloth 90+4' | | | Stadium: Dashrath Stadium; Attendance: 250; Referee: Yapa Y.A. Pabasara Minisarani (Sri Lanka) |

| 10 September 2022 SAFF W GS | Maldives | 0–9 | India | Kathmandu, Nepal |
| 17:30 UTC+5:45 | | | Tamang 24', 45+2', 85', 88'; Naorem 42'; Dangmei 53', 86'; Guguloth 55'; Kashmina 84' | Stadium: Dashrath Stadium; Attendance: 180; Referee: Anjana Rai (Nepal) |

| 13 September 2022 SAFF W GS | India | 0–3 | Bangladesh | Kathmandu, Nepal |
| 17:30 UTC+5:45 | | | Shopna 12', 52'; Sarkar 22' | Stadium: Dashrath Stadium; Attendance: 279; Referee: Choki Om (Bhutan) |

| 16 September 2022 SAFF W SF | Nepal | 1–0 | India | Kathmandu, Nepal |
| 17:30 UTC+5:45 | Rashmi 45+1' | | | Stadium: Dashrath Stadium; Attendance: 7253; Referee: Choki Om (Bhutan) |

== 2023 ==
| 15 February Friendly | India | 2–2 | Nepal | Chennai, India |
| 19:30 UTC+5:30 | Guguloth 56'; Indumathi 68' | AIFF | Bhandari 90' (pen.), 90+2' | Stadium: Jawaharlal Nehru Stadium; Referee: Alamgir Sarker (Bangladesh) |

| 18 February Friendly | India | 0–0 | Nepal | Chennai, India |
| 19:30 UTC+5:30 | | AIFF | | Stadium: Jawaharlal Nehru Stadium; Referee: Alamgir Sarker (Bangladesh) |

| 19 March Friendly | Jordan | 2–1 | India | Amman, Jordan |
| 18:30 UTC+5:30 | Jbarah 8'; Al-Jamaeen 12' | Report | Gour 74' | Stadium: Petra Stadium |

| 22 March Friendly | Jordan | 0–0 | India | Amman, Jordan |
| 18:30 UTC+5:30 | | Report | | Stadium: Petra Stadium |

| 28 March Friendly | Uzbekistan | 3–2 | India | Tashkent, Uzbekistan |
| 17:30 UTC+5:30 | Khabibullaeva 7'; Karachik 23'; Zaripova 90+2' | Report | Dangmei 22'; Indumathi 61' | Stadium: Pakhtakor Central Stadium |

| 4 April 2024 Olympic Qualifiers Round 1 | Kyrgyzstan | 0–5 | India | Bishkek, Kyrgyzstan |
| 20:00 UTC+6 | | | Tamang 6', 42'; Guguloth 45+3'; Hemam 61'; Gour 63' | Stadium: Dolen Omurzakov Stadium; Attendance: 354; Referee: Pansa Chaisanit (Thailand) |

| 7 April 2024 Olympic Qualifiers Round 1 | India | 4–0 | Kyrgyzstan | Bishkek, Kyrgyzstan |
| 20:00 UTC+6 | Sandhiya 18', 56'; Tamang 24'; Gour 85' | | | Stadium: Dolen Omurzakov Stadium; Referee: Kim Yu-Jeong (South Korea) |

| 21 September 2022 Asian Games | Chinese Taipei | 2–1 | India | Wenzhou, China |
| 17:00 UTC+5:30 | Li-chin 68'; Yu-hsuan 84' | Report | Tamang 46' | Stadium: Wenzhou Olympic Sports Center; Attendance: 5,681; Referee: Casey Reibelt (Australia) |

| 24 September 2022 Asian Games | India | 0–1 | Thailand | Wenzhou, China |
| 13:30 UTC+5:30 | | Report | Thongrong 51' | Stadium: Wenzhou Olympic Sports Center; Attendance: 16,047; Referee: Le Thi Ly (Vietnam) |

| 26 October 2024 Olympic Qualifiers Round 2 | Japan | 7–0 | India | Tashkent, Uzbekistan |
| 15:30 UTC+5:30 | Nakashima 17', 46'; Hayashi 53'; Tanaka 54'; Moriya 56'; Seike 73'; Naomoto 81' | Report | | Stadium: Lokomotiv Stadium; Attendance: 100; Referee: Yang Shu-ting (Chinese Taipei) |

| 29 October 2024 Olympic Qualifiers Round 2 | India | 1–3 | Vietnam | Tashkent, Uzbekistan |
| 15:30 UTC+5:30 | Sandhiya 80' | Report | Huỳnh Như 4'; Trần Thị 22'; Phạm Hải Yến 73' | Stadium: Lokomotiv Stadium; Attendance: 150; Referee: Pansa Chaisanit (Thailand) |

| 1 November 2024 Olympic Qualifiers Round 2 | Uzbekistan | 3–0 | India | Tashkent, Uzbekistan |
| 17:30 UTC+5:30 | Kudratova 2'; Karachik 51', 83' | Report | | Stadium: Bunyodkor Stadium; Attendance: 1,850; Referee: Veronika Bernatskaya (Kyrgyz Republic) |

== 2024 ==
| 21 February 2024 Turkish Women's Cup | India | 4–3 | Estonia | Alanya, Turkey |
| 13:30 UTC+5:30 | Kalyan 17', 81'; Indumathi 62'; Xaxa 79' | AIFF; EJL | Tammik 32'; Kubassova 88'; Lillemäe 90' | Stadium: Gold City Sport Complex; Referee: Melis Özçiğdem (Turkey) |

| 24 February 2024 Turkish Women's Cup | India | 2–0 | Hong Kong | Alanya, Turkey |
| 19:00 UTC+5:30 | Tamang 19'; Guguloth 79' | Report | | Stadium: Gold City Sport Complex; Referee: Melek Dakan (Turkey) |

| 27 February 2024 Turkish Women's Cup | Kosovo | 1–0 | India | Alanya, Turkey |
| 13:30 UTC+5:30 | Memeti 90+2' | AIFFGSA | | Stadium: Gold City Sport Complex; Referee: Gamze Durmuş (Turkey) |

| 31 May Friendly | Uzbekistan | 3–0 | India | Tashkent, Uzbekistan |
| 17:00 UTC+5 | Khabibullaeva 49' (pen.), 77', 89' | ReportGSA | | Stadium: Milliy Stadium; Attendance: 67; Referee: Edita Mirabidova (Uzbekistan) |

| 4 June Friendly | Uzbekistan | 0–0 | India | Tashkent, Uzbekistan |
| 17:00 UTC+5 | | Report | | Stadium: Milliy Stadium; Attendance: 64 |

| 9 July Friendly | Myanmar | 2–1 | India | Yangon, Myanmar |
| --:-- UTC+6:30 | Win Theingi Tun 14'; San Thaw Thaw 74' | Report | Xaxa 58' | Stadium: Thuwunna Stadium |

| 12 July Friendly | Myanmar | 1–1 | India | Yangon, Myanmar |
| --:-- UTC+6:30 | Win Theingi Tun 50' | Report | Xaxa 48' | Stadium: Thuwunna Stadium |

| 17 October 2024 SAFF W GS | Pakistan | 2–5 | India | Kathmandu, Nepal |
| 17:30 UTC+5:45 | Suha Hirani 45+2' (pen.); Kayla Siddiqi 47' | Report | Dangmei 5', 42'; Kalyan 17'; Ngangom 35'; Chouhan 78' | Stadium: Dashrath Stadium; Attendance: 452; Referee: Anjana Rai (Nepal) |

| 23 October 2024 SAFF W GS | India | 1–3 | Bangladesh | Kathmandu, Nepal |
| 17:30 UTC+5:45 | Ngangom 43' | Report | Afeida Khandaker 19'; Tohura 29', 42' | Stadium: Dashrath Stadium; Attendance: 251; Referee: Choki Om (Bhutan) |

| 27 October 2024 SAFF W SF | Nepal | 1–1 (4–2 p) | India | Kathmandu, Nepal |
| 18:30 UTC+5:45 | Bhandari 66' | Report | Basfore 62' | Stadium: Dashrath Stadium; Attendance: 18,009; Referee: Choki Om (Bhutan) |
| | Penalties |
| | Bhandari (penalty scored); Rana (penalty scored); Sabita Rana Magar (penalty scored); Amisha Karki (penalty scored) | | (penalty missed) Loitongbam; (penalty scored) Kalyan; (penalty scored) Shirvoikar; (penalty missed) Sorokhaibam |

| 30 December Friendly | India | 14–0 | Maldives | Bengaluru, India |
| 15:30 UTC+5:30 | Xaxa 7', 8', 15'; Kom 12', 21', 29', 52'; Sillay 16', 45'; Basfore 51'; Sorokhaibam 54'; D'Souza 59', 66'; Haldar 62' | Report | | Stadium: Padukone – Dravid Centre for Sports Excellence; Referee: Kanika Barman (India) |

== 2025 ==
| 2 January Friendly | India | 11–1 | Maldives | Bengaluru, India |
| 15:30 UTC+5:30 | Kipgen 12', 16', 56', 59'; D'Souza 15'; Haneefa 17' (o.g.); Pooja 41'; Nongmeikapam 45+1'; Gurung 62', 68'; Khumukcham 71' (pen.) | Report | Rifa 27' | Stadium: Padukone – Dravid Centre for Sports Excellence; Referee: Ranjita Devi Tekcham (India) |

| 20 February 2025 Pink Ladies Cup | Jordan | 0–2 | India | Al Hamriyah, United Arab Emirates |
| 15:00 UTC+4 | | Report | Naorem 23'; Kalyan 54' | Stadium: Al Hamriya Sports Club Stadium |

| 23 February 2025 Pink Ladies Cup | Russia | 2–0 | India | Al Hamriyah, United Arab Emirates |
| 19:00 UTC+4 | Zhukova 25'; Smirnova 90+2' | Report | | Stadium: Al Hamriya Sports Club Stadium; Referee: Khudum Bhit Khulud (United Arab Emirates) |

| 26 February 2025 Pink Ladies Cup | India | 0–3 | South Korea | Al Hamriyah, United Arab Emirates |
| 11:00 UTC+4 | | Report | Choi Yoo-jung 8'; Choi Dak-yeong 27'; Moon Eun-ju 81' | Stadium: Al Hamriya Sports Club Stadium |

| 30 May Friendly | Uzbekistan | 1–0 | India | Bengaluru, India |
| 16:30 UTC+5:30 | Khabibullaeva 56' | Report | | Stadium: Padukone-Dravid Centre for Sports Excellence; Referee: Kim Yu-jeong (South Korea) |

| 3 June Friendly | India | 0–1 | Uzbekistan | Bengaluru, India |
| 16:30 UTC+5:30 | | Report | Kudratova 49' | Stadium: Padukone-Dravid Centre for Sports Excellence; Referee: Cha Min-ji (South Korea) |

| 23 June 2026 AFC ACQ | Mongolia | 0–13 | India | Chiang Mai, Thailand |
| 16:00 UTC+7 | | Report | Basfore 8'; Guguloth 20', 59'; Xaxa 29', 45', 46', 52', 55'; Haldar 67'; Prasad 71'; Selladurai 73', 86'; Dangmei 75' (pen.) | Stadium: 700th Anniversary Stadium; Referee: Jon Sol-mi (North Korea) |

| 29 June 2026 AFC ACQ | India | 4–0 | Timor-Leste | Chiang Mai, Thailand |
| 16:00 UTC+7 | Kalyan 12', 80'; Tamang 58'; Kom 85' | Report | | Stadium: 700th Anniversary Stadium; Referee: Doumouh Albakkar (Lebanon) |

| 2 July 2026 AFC ACQ | India | 5–0 | Iraq | Chiang Mai, Thailand |
| 16:00 UTC+7 | Basfore 14'; Kalyan 44'; Angamuthu 48'; Phanjoubam 64'; Nongmaithem 80' | Report | | Stadium: 700th Anniversary Stadium; Referee: Azusa Sugino (Japan) |

| 5 July 2026 AFC ACQ | Thailand | 1–2 | India | Chiang Mai, Thailand |
| 19:30 UTC+7 | Chatchawan 47' | Report | Basfore 29', 74' | Stadium: 700th Anniversary Stadium; Referee: Kim Yu-jeong (South Korea) |

| 21 October Friendly | Iran | 2–0 | India | Shillong, India |
| 18:00 UTC+5:30 | Didar 67', 74' | Report | | Stadium: Jawaharlal Nehru Stadium; Referee: Pansa Chaisanit (Thailand) |

| 27 October Friendly | India | 1–2 | Nepal | Shillong, India |
| 18:00 UTC+5:30 | Shirvoikar 81' | Report | Bhandari 2', 63' | Stadium: Jawaharlal Nehru Stadium; Referee: Pansa Chaisanit (Thailand) |

== 2026 ==
| 4 March 2026 AFC Women's Asian Cup | Vietnam | 2–1 | India | Perth, Australia |
| 16:30 (IST) | Ngân 30', 90+4' | AFC; AIFF; FIFA | Nongrum 52' | Stadium: Perth Rectangular Stadium; Attendance: 1,961; Referee: Kim Yu-jeong (South Korea) |

| 7 March 2026 AFC Women's Asian Cup | India | 0–11 | Japan | Perth, Australia |
| 16:30 (IST) | | AFC; AIFF; FIFA | Yamamoto 4'; Hasegawa 13'; Miyazawa 20', 35', 81'; Seike 45+5', 55'; Ueki 47', 50', 65'; Hijikata 62' | Stadium: Perth Rectangular Stadium; Attendance: 3,233; Referee: Veronika Bernatskaia (Kyrgyzstan) |

| 10 March 2026 AFC Women's Asian Cup | India | 1–3 | Chinese Taipei | Sydney, Australia |
| 14:30 (IST) | Kalyan 39' | AFC; AIFF; FIFA | Su 12'; Elangbam 45+9' (o.g.); Chen 77' | Stadium: Western Sydney Stadium; Attendance: 3,648; Referee: Casey Reibelt (Australia) |

| 11 April 2026 FIFA Series | Kenya | 2–0 | India | Nairobi, Kenya |
| 20:30 IST | Amnyolet 2'; Engesha 57' | FIFA; AIFF | | Stadium: Nyayo National Stadium; Referee: Josephine Nantongo (Uganda) |

| 15 April 2026 FIFA Series | India | 3–2 | Malawi | Nairobi, Kenya |
| 16:30 IST | Oraon 18'; A. Singh 45+1'; Selladurai 84' | FIFA; AIFF | Khumalo 43'; Henry 60' | Stadium: Nyayo National Stadium; Referee: Yordanos Mulugeta (Ethiopia) |

| 25 May 2026 2026 SAFF GS | Maldives | 0–11 | India | Margao, India |
| 19:30 | | SAFF; AIFF | Naorem 10', 17'; Xaxa 29'; A. Singh 34', 66', 70', 86'; Dangmei 39'; Shirvoikar 52', 68'; Basfore 60' | Stadium: Jawaharlal Nehru Stadium; Attendance: 225; Referee: Sharaban Tahura (Bangladesh) |

| 31 May 2026 2026 SAFF GS | India | 3–0 | Bangladesh | Margao, India |
| 19:30 | Xaxa 36'; Kom 78' (pen.); Prasad 90+1' | SAFF; AIFF | | Stadium: Jawaharlal Nehru Stadium; Attendance: 553; Referee: Choki Om (Bhutan) |

| 3 June 2026 2026 SAFF SF | India | 1–0 | Bhutan | Margao, India |
| 20:00 | Nongrum 58' | SAFF; AIFF | | Stadium: Jawaharlal Nehru Stadium; Attendance: 324; Referee: Yapa Appuhamilage Pabasara Minisaraniyapa (Sri Lanka) |

| 5 June 2026 2026 SAFF Final | Bangladesh | 1–3 | India | Margao, India |
| 18:30 | R. Chakma 45+1' | SAFF; AIFF | Xaxa 42'; Nongrum 46'; Kom 82' | Stadium: Jawaharlal Nehru Stadium; Attendance: 729; Referee: Anjana Rai (Nepal) |

| 8 October Friendly | India | 0–4 | Russia | Kolkata, India |
| 18:00 (IST) | | AIFF; RFU | Sheina 41'; Petukhova 60', 65'; Svistunova 81' | Stadium: Kishore Bharati Krirangan; Referee: Virendha Rai (Bhutan) |

| 11 October Friendly | India | 0–8 | Russia | Kolkata, India |
| 18:00 (IST) | | AIFF; RFU | Ishmukhametova 21', 43' (pen.); Achoian 25', 45+1'; Kishmakhova 29'; Mashina 50', 51'; Semenova 74' | Stadium: Kishore Bharati Krirangan; Referee: Virendha Rai (Bhutan) |

== See also ==
- India national football team results (2020–present)
- India women's national football team results (unofficial matches)
- India women's national football team results (2010–2019)
