= Ribansi Jamu =

Indian football player

Personal information
- Date of birth: 16 December 2008 (age 17)
- Place of birth: Meghalaya, India
- Height: 1.66 m (5 ft 5 in)
- Position: Goalkeeper

Team information
- Current team: Garhwal United
- Number: 49

Senior career*
Years	Team	Apps	(Gls)
2022–2023	Laitkor Rngi SC		
2024–	Garhwal United		

International career^{‡}
2025–	India U20	2	(0)
2025–	India	2	(0)
- * Club domestic league appearances and goals ‡ National team caps and goals as of 25 May 2026

Ribansi Jamu (born 16 December 2008) is an Indian professional footballer from Meghalaya who plays as a goalkeeper for the club Garhwal United Football Club in the Indian Women's League 2 and the India women's national football team. She is a product of Baichung Bhutia Football Schools programme.

== Early life and career ==
Jamu is from Shillong, Meghalaya.

She played in the Shillong Sports Association Women's Football League, the top league in Shillong, Meghalaya, for Laitkor Rngi Sports Club women's team. Later, she joined the Baichung Bhutia Football Schools Residential Academy at Nashik, Maharashtra. In May 2024, she played for Football Delhi in the 28th Rajmata Jijabai Trophy. In 2022, playing for Sati Raja Memorial SS of Ri-Bhoi, she was declared as the best goalkeeper in the under 17 girls division of the state level Subroto Cup.

=== International career ===
She was selected in the 23-player Indian squad by Indian coach Joakim Alexandersson and she played the second FIFA international friendlies against Maldives on 2 January at the Padukone-Dravid Centre for Sports Excellence in Bengaluru. In that match, she made her senior India debut as a substitute coming off the bench to replace Nandini.

She represented the Indian under 20 football team in the Pink Ladies International Youth Cup at Turkey.

== Career statistics ==
=== International ===
As of 25 May 2026

National team	Year	Caps	Goals
India	2025	1	0
India	2026	1	0
Total		2	0

== Honours ==
India

- SAFF Women's Championship: 2026
