= Kohati Kisku =

Bangladeshi footballer

Personal information
- Full name: Kohati Kisku
- Date of birth: 5 September 2005 (age 21)
- Place of birth: Thakurgaon District, Bangladesh
- Height: 1.50 m (4 ft 11 in)
- Position: Defender

Team information
- Current team: Bangladesh Police

Youth career
- 2014–2017: Rangatungi United

Senior career*
| Years | Team | Apps | (Gls) |
| 2024 | ARB College | | (1) |
| 2025– | Bangladesh Police | | |

International career^{‡}
| 2019 | Bangladesh U15 | | |
| 2022 | Bangladesh U17 | | |
| 2025– | Bangladesh | 8 | (2) |
- * Club domestic league appearances and goals as of 1 January 2026 ‡ National team caps and goals as of 21 September 2026

Kohati Kisku (Bengali: কোহাতি কিস্কু; born 5 September 2005) is a Bangladeshi women's professional footballer who plays as a defender for Bangladesh Police and the Bangladesh national team.

== Early life ==
Kohati Kisku was born in Thakurgaon District, Bangladesh. She was raised in a Christian family belonging to the Santal community.

Kisku began playing football for her local school team in the Bangamata Primary School Football Tournament. In 2014, former college teacher Tajul Islam established the Rangatungi United Female Football Academy. After scouting her eldest sister Bithika, Islam recruited Kisku and her sister Sohagi to the academy. Kisku trained at the facility for two to three years before being selected for the national youth setup. Alongside her football training, she completed her Secondary School Certificate (SSC) examinations.

== Domestic career ==
Kisku began her domestic football career playing for the Thakurgaon district under-14 team. As a starting midfielder, she helped the team reach the final of the JFA U-14 National Women's Football Championship in November 2017. This was the first time the district reached the final of the tournament, where they finished as runners-up.

In the Bangladesh Women's Football League, Kisku played for ARB Sporting during the 2024 season. On 9 May 2024, she scored a goal at the Birshreshtha Shaheed Mostafa Kamal Stadium in Kamalapur during a 17–0 win against Jamalpur Kacharipara Club.

Kisku joined Bangladesh Police FC ahead of the 2025–26 league season. On 29 December 2025, Kisku played in the team's first league match, where Police FC lost 2–0 to the Bangladesh Army team.

== International career ==
Kisku was called up to the Bangladesh under-15 national team in October 2019 for the SAFF U-15 Women's Championship in Bhutan, finishing as tournament runners-up after a defeat to India in 5–3 penalty shootout. She joined the under-17 squad's training camp ahead of the 2022 AFC U-17 Women's Asian Cup qualifiers. Following the national team's victory at the 2022 SAFF Women's Championship, Kisku and her sister Sohagi received a Tk10 lakh cash prize from the government. In August 2023, the Bangladesh Football Federation (BFF) introduced a revised central contract system following player demands for better pay, under which Kisku was awarded a central contract and placed in the "Pool C" tier.

In February 2025, 18 senior players boycotted the national team training camp to protest head coach Peter Butler. Kisku was among the 13 players who continued attending the camp at the National Stadium, and she was subsequently named in the 23-member senior squad for two friendly matches against the United Arab Emirates. During the 2026 AFC Women's Asian Cup qualification in June 2025, Kisku scored her first senior international goal in the 40th minute of a 7–0 victory over Bahrain, following a cross from Maria Manda. In the next group match against Myanmar, Bangladesh won 2–1 and qualified for the AFC Women's Asian Cup for the first time.

Kisku was included in the squad for a home tri-nation cup against Malaysia and Azerbaijan in November 2025. In February 2026, she was selected for the 26-member squad for the 2026 AFC Women's Asian Cup in Australia. At the tournament in March 2026, she started in all the group stage matches against China, North Korea, and Uzbekistan and finished the tournament without a point. In May 2026, she was selected for the 2026 SAFF Women's Championship in Goa, India. During the opening Group B match on 28 May, she scored a stoppage-time header from a corner kick by Ritu Porna Chakma, finalizing a 4–2 victory over the Maldives. In the subsequent group stage match against India, Bangladesh suffered a 3–0 defeat which ended 10-match unbeaten streak in the SAFF competition. Bangladesh lost the final match 1–3 to India, ending the consecutive SAFF title streak.

== Personal life ==
Kohati Kisku is the youngest of three sisters, alongside Bithika and Sohagi, and has two brothers. Her sister, Sohagi Kisku, is also a professional footballer who plays for the Bangladesh women's national football team.
