= Thoibisana Chanu Toijam =

Indian footballer

Thoibisana Chanu
Personal information
- Full name: Thoibisana Chanu Toijam
- Date of birth: 7 March 2007 (age 19)
- Place of birth: Manipur, India
- Height: 1.69 m (5 ft 7 in)
- Position: Defender

Team information
- Current team: East Bengal
- Number: 14

Youth career
- 2022: Manipur

Senior career*
Years	Team	Apps	(Gls)
–2022	Young Welfare Club		
2022–2023	East Bengal		
2023–2026	Sreebhumi		
2026–	East Bengal		

International career^{‡}
2023	India U17	4	(1)
2024	India U20	15	(1)
2024–	India	3	(0)
- * Club domestic league appearances and goals as of 14 May 2025 ‡ National team caps and goals as of 25 May 2026

Thoibisana Chanu Toijam (Meitei: Toijam Thoibisana Chanu, born 7 March 2007) is an Indian professional footballer from Manipur who plays as a midfielder for the Indian Women's League club East Bengal and the India women's national football team.

== Early life and career ==
Chanu is from Manipur. She was selected for the senior National camp in December 2024, ahead of the two FIFA international friendlies with Maldives to be played at Bengaluru. Later, she made it to the 23–member squad. In April 2022, she played for Young Welfare Club, Langthabal in the Hero Indian Women League qualifying round.

She made her senior international debut coming in as a substitute in the second half of the first match against Maldives at the Padukone-Dravid Centre for Sports Excellence in Bengaluru on 30 December 2024. The new chief coach of the Indian women's team Crispin Chettri named 32 probables including Chanu for the Pink Ladies Cup to be played at Dubai in February 2025. Earlier in February 2024, she was part of the Indian team that became joint-winners of the 2024 SAFF U-19 Women's Championship. In June 2022, she represented Manipur unit, AMFA, in the Hero Women's Junior Under–17 National Football Championship 2022 at Guwahati, Assam.

== Career statistics ==
=== International ===
As of 25 May 2026

National team	Year	Caps	Goals
India	2024	1	0
India	2025	1	0
India	2026	1	0
Total		3	0

== Honours ==
India

- SAFF Women's Championship: 2026
