= Lynda Kom =

Indian woman football player

Personal information
- Full name: Lynda Kom Serto
- Date of birth: 28 February 2005 (age 21)
- Place of birth: Khoirentak Khunou, Manipur, India
- Height: 1.54 m (5 ft 1 in)
- Position: Forward

Team information
- Current team: Sethu
- Number: 9

Senior career*
Years	Team	Apps	(Gls)
2022	The Young Welfare Club		
2022–2025	Odisha	32	(17)
2025–	Sethu	7	(7)

International career^{‡}
2017–2019	India U17	5	(3)
2022	India U20	12	(8)
2024–	India	19	(7)
- * Club domestic league appearances and goals ‡ National team caps and goals as of 11 October 2026

Lynda Kom Serto (born 28 February 2005) is an Indian professional footballer from Manipur, who plays as a forward for Sethu in the Indian Women's League and the India national football team.

== Early life and education ==
Lynda hails from Khoirentak Khunou village in Manipur. Her father is a farmer, and her mother runs a stationery shop. She is the youngest of four children. She always used to play with the boys who used to play in the ground, which is close to her house. Despite her father's hesitation, she continued to play with the boys and got selected for the Sports Authority of India Training Centre hostel at Imphal. Her nickname is Biju, after the Manipuri actress Biju Ningombam.

== Career ==
Lynda made her debut for India in 2017, at the SAFF U-15 Women's Championship in Bangladesh. She also played in the U-16 AFC Championship Qualifiers. She performed well for Manipur at the 2019 Junior Nationals at Kolhapur that paved the way for her selection to the 2019 Under-17 World Cup. In that tournament, she scored six goals and was awarded the golden boot.

She scored five goals in the SAFF U-18 Women's Championship in Jamshedpur, where India beat Bangladesh on better goal difference and Lynda was declared as the Most Valuable Player after bagging the golden boot for being the top goal scorer.

== Career statistics ==
=== International ===
As of 11 October 2026

National team	Year	Caps	Goals
India	2024	1	4
India	2025	9	1
India	2026	9	2
Total		19	7

Scores and results list India's goal tally first.

List of international goals scored by Lynda Kom
No.	Date	Venue	Opponent	Score	Result	Competition
1.	30 December 2024	Padukone – Dravid Centre for Sports Excellence, Bengaluru, India	Maldives	3–0	14–0	Friendly
2.	30 December 2024	Padukone – Dravid Centre for Sports Excellence, Bengaluru, India	Maldives	6–0	14–0	Friendly
3.	30 December 2024	Padukone – Dravid Centre for Sports Excellence, Bengaluru, India	Maldives	7–0	14–0	Friendly
4.	30 December 2024	Padukone – Dravid Centre for Sports Excellence, Bengaluru, India	Maldives	10–0	14–0	Friendly
5.	29 June 2025	700th Anniversary Stadium, Chiang Mai, Thailand	Timor-Leste	4–0	4–0	2026 AFC Women's Asian Cup qualification
6.	31 May 2026	Jawaharlal Nehru Stadium, Margao, India	Bangladesh	2–0	3–0	2026 SAFF Women's Championship
7.	6 June 2026	Jawaharlal Nehru Stadium, Margao, India	Bangladesh	3–1	3–1	2026 SAFF Women's Championship

== Honours ==
India

- SAFF Women's Championship: 2026

Odisha

- Indian Women's League: 2023–24
