= Nirmala Devi Phanjoubam =

Indian footballer

Nirmala Devi
Personal information
- Full name: Nirmala Devi Phanjoubam
- Date of birth: 2 March 2003 (age 23)
- Place of birth: Manipur, India
- Height: 1.64 m (5 ft 5 in)
- Position: Defender

Team information
- Current team: Sethu
- Number: 3

Senior career*
Years	Team	Apps	(Gls)
- Andro Mahilla MA
2021–2022	Kickstart		
- United Pukhao SA
2022–2023	Eastern Sporting Union		
2023–	Sethu		

International career^{‡}
- India U20
2025–	India	16	(1)
- * Club domestic league appearances and goals ‡ National team caps and goals as of 6 June 2026

Nirmala Devi Phanjoubam (Meitei: Phanjoubam Nirmala Devi, 2 March 2003) is an Indian professional footballer from Manipur who plays as a defender for the Indian Women's League club Sethu and the India national football team. She has also represented the clubs Eastern Sporting Union and Kickstart at the domestic level.

== Early life and career ==
Devi is from Manipur. She is selected by Indian chief coach Crispin Chettri for the National camp at Anantapur, Andhra Pradesh, in preparation for the Pink Ladies Cup, to be held at Sharjah, United Arab Emirates, from 20 to 26 February 2025. On 17 February 2025, she was named in the final squad. She made her senior India debut against Jordan at the Al Hamriya Sports Club Stadium, Sharjah on 20 February 2025.

In July 2020, she was in the probables list selected by All India Football Federation for the Under–17 Women's World Cup 2021.

== Career statistics ==
=== International ===
As of 6 June 2026

National team	Year	Caps	Goals
India	2025	9	1
India	2026	7	0
Total		16	1

Scores and results list India's goal tally first.

List of international goals scored by Nirmala Devi Phanjoubam
No.	Date	Venue	Opponent	Score	Result	Competition
1.	2 July 2025	700th Anniversary Stadium, Chiang Mai, Thailand	Iraq	4–0	5–0	2026 AFC Women's Asian Cup qualification

== Honours ==
India

- SAFF Women's Championship: 2026
