= Anika Rania Siddiqui =

Footballer playing for Bangladesh (born 2005)

Personal information
- Date of birth: 25 May 2005 (age 21)
- Place of birth: Stockholm, Sweden
- Height: 1.55 m (5 ft 1 in)
- Position: Midfielder

Senior career*
Years	Team	Apps	(Gls)
2023	IF Brommapojkarna	1	(0)

International career^{‡}
2026–	Bangladesh	8	(1)
Medal record
Women's football
Representing Bangladesh
SAFF Women's Championship
Runner-up	2026 India
- * Club domestic league appearances and goals ‡ National team caps and goals as of 21 September 2026

Anika Rania Siddiqui (born 25 May 2005) is a footballer who plays as a midfielder. Born in Sweden, she plays for the Bangladesh national team.

== Early career ==
Siddiqui was born and raised in Sweden. She spent her youth years at AIK Stockholm before continuing her development at IF Brommapojkarna.

== Club career ==
Siddiqui made her debut in the Swedish Cup in 2023 when she was 17, coming on in the 87th minute against Eskilstuna United DFF.

== International career ==
After a trial, Siddiqui was selected for the national team and made her debut against China in the 2026 AFC Women's Asian Cup. She scored her first goal against the Maldives in the 2026 SAFF Women's Championship.

== International goals ==
No.	Date	Venue	Opponent	Score	Result	Competition
1	29 May 2026	Fatorda Stadium, Margao, India	Maldives	1–0	4–2	2026 SAFF Women's Championship
