= Karishma Shirvoikar =

Indian footballer

Personal information
- Full name: Karishma Purushottam Shirvoikar
- Date of birth: 4 August 2001 (age 25)
- Place of birth: Odxel, Goa, India
- Height: 1.51 m (4 ft 11 in)
- Position: Forward

Team information
- Current team: Kickstart

Senior career*
Years	Team	Apps	(Gls)
2017–2019	Panjim Footballers	5	(7)
2019	→ PVC Parra (loan)		
2020–2022	Gokulam Kerala	17	(7)
2022–2023	Mumbai Knights	7	(1)
2023–2025	Kickstart	26	(13)
2025–2026	Sribhumi		
2026–	Kickstart		

International career^{‡}
2018	India U17		
2021–	India	19	(3)
- * Club domestic league appearances and goals ‡ National team caps and goals as of 3 June 2026

Karishma Purushottam Shirvoikar (born 4 August 2001) is an Indian professional footballer from Goa, who plays as a forward for the Indian Women's League club Kickstart and represents the India women's national football team.

== Early life ==
Shirvoikar is from a small sea-side village named Odxel, on the outskirts of Panaji, Goa. Her mother, Anjani, sells vegetables for a living as her father, Purushottam, is sick and stays at home. She studied at Our Lady of the Rosary Higher Secondary school, Dona Paula. She lives in Panaji. In the school, she learnt her basics from coach Carol Fernandes Gomes.

== Career ==
Shirvoikar started playing football on the beaches of Goa with boys in 2011 and played in the Times Girls Soccer League for her school in 2014. In 2017, she joined Panjim Footballers and was part of the team that won the Goa Football League for two years. In the same year she was selected to represent Goa in the Junior Nationals.

In 2018, she took part in the Under-17 Brics Cup in South Africa and in 2019, she played for PVC Parra in the Goan's Women's League, and for Panjim Footballers in the Indian Women's League. She was selected by Palamos CF to train in Spain with CD Fontsanta Fatjo, a third division team, also in 2019. For two seasons, in 2019-2020 and 2021–2022, she played for Gokulam FC. In September 2021, she was dropped from the Indian team which played friendlies against UAE and Bahrain. From 2023 to 2024, she is playing for Kickstart.

In February 2023, she was back in the Indian team that played two friendlies against Nepal, and the next month in March, she played two friendly matches against Jordan at the Petra Stadium in Amman, Jordan as preparation for Olympic Qualifier. She was selected for the AFC Women's Olympic Qualifier Round 1 at Bishkek, Kyrgyz Republic also in April 2023.

== Career statistics ==
=== International ===
As of 3 June 2026

National team	Year	Caps	Goals
India	2021	2	0
India	2022	0	0
India	2023	5	0
India	2024	3	0
India	2025	4	1
India	2026	5	2
Total		19	3

Scores and results list India's goal tally first.

List of international goals scored by Karishma Shirvoikar
No.	Date	Venue	Opponent	Score	Result	Competition
1.	27 October 2025	Jawaharlal Nehru Stadium, Shillong, India	Nepal	1–2	1–2	Friendly
2.	25 May 2026	Jawaharlal Nehru Stadium, Margao, India	Maldives	6–0	11–0	2026 SAFF Women's Championship
3.	25 May 2026	Jawaharlal Nehru Stadium, Margao, India	Maldives	9–0	11–0	2026 SAFF Women's Championship

== Honours ==
India

- SAFF Women's Championship: 2026

Gokulam Kerala

- Indian Women's League: 2019–20, 2021–22

Kickstart

- Karnataka Women's League: 2023–24

Panjim Footballers

- Goa Women's League: 2017, 2018
