= Aveka Singh =

Indian footballer (born 2003)

Personal information
- Date of birth: 30 December 2003 (age 22)
- Place of birth: Delhi, India
- Height: 1.67 m (5 ft 6 in)
- Position: Midfielder

Team information
- Current team: Næstved
- Number: 9

Youth career
- 2016: FCBEscola India

College career
Years	Team	Apps	(Gls)
2021–2024	UC Irvine Anteaters	6	(0)

Senior career*
Years	Team	Apps	(Gls)
2020–2021	Hans Capital	19	(4)
2022–2023	Fundació Terrassa	24	(11)
2025–	Næstved	15	(1)

International career^{‡}
2017–2020	India U17	11	(5)
2026–	India	7	(5)
- * Club domestic league appearances and goals as of 29 August 2026 ‡ National team caps and goals as of 6 June 2026

Aveka Singh (born 30 December 2003) is an Indian professional footballer who plays as a midfielder for the B-Liga club Næstved and the India national team.

== Early life ==
Singh started playing football at the age of five. She played football at school in India. She has regarded Brazil international Neymar as her football idol.

== Education ==
Singh attended the University of California, Irvine in the United States. She attended the university on an athletic scholarship. She studied business economics.

== Club career ==
Singh was described as "seen in action at the Junior Girls' National Football Championship... as well as the Hero U17 Women's Championship". She played for American side UC Irvine Anteaters. She also played for Spanish side Terrassa. She played for the club during the American off-season.

== International career ==
Singh is an India youth international. She helped the India women's national under-15 football team win the 2018 SAFF U-15 Women's Championship. She could have played for the India women's national under-17 football team at the FIFA U-17 Women's World Cup but it was cancelled due to the coronavirus pandemic. She was described as "made her international debut under current women's senior team coach Maymol Rocky".

== Style of play ==
Singh mainly operates as a midfielder. She initially operated as a left-winger. After that, she switched to midfielder.

== Personal life ==
Singh is the daughter of Dr Rachna and Subir Singh. She is a native of Delhi and started playing her football with her uncle Nitin Chainani and mentored by her agent Bhawna Khanna. She has been a supporter of English side Tottenham Hotspur.

== Career statistics ==
=== International ===
As of 6 June 2026

National team	Year	Caps	Goals
India	2026	7	5
Total		7	5

Scores and results list India's goal tally first, score column indicates score after each Singh goal.

List of international goals scored by Aveka Singh
No.	Date	Venue	Opponent	Score	Result	Competition
1.	15 April 2026	Nyayo National Stadium, Nairobi, Kenya	Malawi	2–1	3–2	2026 FIFA Series
2.	25 May 2026	Jawaharlal Nehru Stadium, Margao, India	Maldives	4–0	11–0	2026 SAFF Women's Championship
3.	25 May 2026	Jawaharlal Nehru Stadium, Margao, India	Maldives	8–0	11–0	2026 SAFF Women's Championship
4.	25 May 2026	Jawaharlal Nehru Stadium, Margao, India	Maldives	10–0	11–0	2026 SAFF Women's Championship
5.	25 May 2026	Jawaharlal Nehru Stadium, Margao, India	Maldives	11–0	11–0	2026 SAFF Women's Championship

== Honours ==
India

- SAFF Women's Championship: 2026
