= Sangita Basfore =

Indian footballer

Personal information
- Full name: Sangita Basfore
- Date of birth: 12 July 1996 (age 30)
- Place of birth: Kalyani, West Bengal, India
- Height: 1.63 m (5 ft 4 in)
- Position: Midfielder

Team information
- Current team: Sethu

Senior career*
Years	Team	Apps	(Gls)
- West Bengal
–2016	Chandney SC		
2016–2018	Rising Students	5	(0)
2018–2024	SSB Women	26	(10)
2025–2026	East Bengal		
2026–	Sethu		

International career^{‡}
2012–2016	India U19	8	(0)
2015–	India	81	(10)
- * Club domestic league appearances and goals ‡ National team caps and goals as of 11 October 2026

Sangita Basfore (born 12 July 1996) is an Indian professional footballer who plays as a midfielder the Indian Women's League club Sethu and the India women's national team.

== Club career ==
=== West Bengal ===
Sangita had featured for the West Bengal State Team before moving to Rising Student Club.

=== Rising Student Club ===
On 2016, Sangita signed for the Indian Women's League side Rising Student Club based in Odisha

=== SSB Women ===
On 2018, Sangeeta signed for SSB Women's FC. On the 2018–19 Indian Women's League, SSB Women's qualified for the Semi-Finals by a comfortable 2–0 victory against Hans Women FC where Sangita scored a fabulous goal before they lost the semi-finals to Sethu FC on a big margin of 8–1. She ended up scoring 3 goals at the end of the season.

== International career ==
Sangita was selected for the India Women's U19 team at the age of 17. Sangeeta was called up for the Indian National Team at the age of 19 for the Olympics Tournament in 2016. Sangita scored her first international goal against Sri Lanka on 2019 SAFF Women's Championship in their group stage match which was held on 17 March 2019. Sangita had also captained the national side against Uzbekistan in the 2019 Turkish Women's Cup which they lost 0–1.

== Career statistics ==
=== International ===
As of 11 October 2026

National team	Year	Caps	Goals
India	2015	1	0
India	2016	2	0
India	2017	1	0
India	2018	3	0
India	2019	26	1
India	2021	9	2
India	2022	0	0
India	2023	10	0
India	2024	12	2
India	2025	8	4
India	2026	9	1
Total		81	10

Scores and results list India's goal tally first.

List of international goals scored by Sangita Basfore
No.	Date	Venue	Opponent	Score	Result	Competition
1.	17 March 2019	Sahid Rangsala, Biratnagar, Nepal	Sri Lanka	4–0	5–0	2019 SAFF Women's Championship
2.	8 April 2021	AGMK Stadium, Olmaliq, Uzbekistan	Belarus	1–2	1–2	Friendly
3.	10 October 2021	Hamad Town Stadium, Hamad Town, Bahrain	Bahrain	1–0	5–0	Friendly
4.	27 October 2024	Dasharath Rangasala, Kathmandu, Nepal	Nepal	1–0	1–1	2024 SAFF Women's Championship
5.	30 December 2024	Padukone – Dravid Centre for Sports Excellence, Bengaluru, India	Maldives	9–0	14–0	Friendly
6.	23 June 2025	700th Anniversary Stadium, Chiang Mai, Thailand	Mongolia	1–0	13–0	2026 AFC Women's Asian Cup qualification
7.	2 July 2025	700th Anniversary Stadium, Chiang Mai, Thailand	Iraq	1–0	5–0	2026 AFC Women's Asian Cup qualification
8.	5 July 2025	700th Anniversary Stadium, Chiang Mai, Thailand	Thailand	1–0	2–1	2026 AFC Women's Asian Cup qualification
9.	5 July 2025	700th Anniversary Stadium, Chiang Mai, Thailand	Thailand	2–1	2–1	2026 AFC Women's Asian Cup qualification
10.	25 May 2026	Jawaharlal Nehru Stadium, Margao, India	Maldives	7–0	11–0	2026 SAFF Women's Championship

== Honours ==
India

- SAFF Women's Championship: 2016, 2019, 2026
- South Asian Games Gold medal: 2016, 2019

East Bengal

- Indian Women's League: 2025–26

Rising Students Club

- Indian Women's League: 2017–18

SSB Women

- Calcutta Women's Football League: 2019–20
