= Bangladesh women's national football team =

Women's association football team representing Bangladesh

Bangladesh
- Nicknames: Bengal Tigresses (বাংলার বাঘিনী); Red and Green (লাল-সবুজ)
- Association: Bangladesh Football Federation (BFF)
- Confederation: AFC (Asia)
- Sub-confederation: SAFF (South Asia)
- Head coach: Peter James Butler
- Captain: Maria Manda
- Most caps: Sabina Khatun (61)
- Top scorer: Sabina Khatun (38)
- Home stadium: National Stadium; BSSS Mostafa Kamal Stadium
- FIFA code: BAN
First colours	Second colours

FIFA ranking
- Current: 106 ▲1 (20 October 2026)
- Highest: 100 (6 December 2013; 11 December 2017)
- Lowest: 147 (24 August 2022)

First international
- Bangladesh 0–1 Nepal (Dhaka, Bangladesh; 29 January 2010)

Biggest win
- Bangladesh 9–0 Bhutan (Cox's Bazar, Bangladesh; 15 December 2010)

Biggest defeat
- North Korea 10–0 Bangladesh (Osaka, Japan; 14 September 2026)

Asian Cup
- Appearances: 1 (first in 2026)
- Best result: group stage (2026)

SAFF Championship
- Appearances: 7 (first in 2010)
- Best result: Champion (2022, 2024)
Medal record
SAFF Championship
Gold medal – first place	2022 Nepal	Team
Gold medal – first place	2024 Nepal	Team
Silver medal – second place	2016 India	Team
Silver medal – second place	2026 India	Team
South Asian Games
Bronze medal – third place	2010 Dhaka	Team
Bronze medal – third place	2016 Guwahati	Team

The Bangladesh women's national football team is the women's national association football team of Bangladesh controlled by the Bangladesh Football Federation under the supervision of the women's football committee. It is a member of the Asian Football Confederation.

Bangladesh won the SAFF Women's Championship in 2022 and 2024. They also secured a bronze medal in the South Asian Federation Games 2010 and a silver medal at the SAFF Women's Championship 2016.

== History ==
=== Origins (2007–2012) ===
Women's football was introduced in Bangladesh when the nation's first-ever football tournament dedicated to women was staged under the Vision Asia programme in November 2007. Eight teams from different districts all over the country took part in the tournament. The tournament's success, led to the Bangladesh Football Federation organizing the 2008 Women's school football tournament, under the Vision Bangladesh programme. The National Football Championship for women was introduced the subsequent year for different district teams to take part in. While in 2009, Golam Robbani Choton, a veteran in the Dhaka football scene, was put in charge of the inactive women's national team. However, the Bangladesh women's team was continuously neglected throughout the late 2000s.

Bangladesh played their first international game on 29 January 2010 against Nepal, during the 2010 South Asian Games, held in Dhaka, losing 1–0. The team impressed in the following fixtures, pulling off two successive victories against Sri Lanka and then Pakistan, respectively. Although they suffered a 0–7 defeat at the hands of India during their last group stage game, Bangladesh secured the bronze medal. The team proceeded to take part in the 2010 SAFF Women's Championship later on that year, which was played on home soil, but this time in Cox's Bazar. They won significantly against Bhutan and Sri Lanka (2–0 and 9–0); however they were defeated by Nepal in the semifinals.

It was in 2011 when the football federation decided to launch the Bangladesh Women's Football League. The national team was active the following year, taking part in the 2012 SAFF Championship. They lost to India and Sri Lanka, attaining their sole victory against Bhutan, 1–0, thanks to a goal from captain Pru Suinu. Nonetheless, the team failed to advance past the group stages.

=== Emergence (2013–2020) ===
After the 2012 SAFF Women's Championship, BFF started to make a structure for the women's team. On the other hand, the government started the Bangamata Sheikh Fazilatunnesa Mujib Gold Cup Football Tournament in 2011, where a number of footballers from all over the country showcased their football playing skill on a yearly basis, strengthening the national team's pipeline of talents. In October 2014, Norio Tsukitate was appointed as the team's first foreign head coach. Bangladesh team management started an almost year-long camp for the 2014 SAFF Women's Championship, and the Bangladesh team won two of their three group matches and reached the semi-finals, where Bangladesh lost against Nepal by 1–0. After the tournament concluded, Golam Robbani Choton returned to head coach duty.

In the 2016 SAFF Women's Championship, Bangladesh reached the final having defeated Maldives 6–0 in the semi-final. Nonetheless, the inexperienced team lost 3–1 to India in the final. The team's fortunes at the 2019 SAFF Women's Championship did not change, as they lost to India by a margin of 4–0 in the semi-final.

=== Golden era (2021–present) ===

Bangladesh's victorious 2022 SAFF Women's Championship Final starting lineup

Bangladesh did not make it to the 2022 AFC Women's Asian Cup qualification. But, after that, Bangladesh played three FIFA friendly matches, one against Hong Kong, where they beat Hong Kong by 5–0 in 2021, and two against Malaysia, where they drew one and won one by 6–0 before the 2022 SAFF Women's Championship.

Bangladesh won all three group matches, defeating Maldives by 3–0, Pakistan by 6–0, and India by 3–0, and reached the semi-finals as unbeaten group champion. In the semi-finals, having defeated Bhutan by 8–0 and they reached the final. Bangladesh faced Nepal in the final, where Bangladesh clinched their maiden SAFF Women's Championship title with a 3–1 victory over Nepal in an entertaining final at the Dasharath Rangasala in Kathmandu on 19 September 2022.

Peter James Butler became Bangladesh's head coach in March 2024. Bangladesh won their second consecutive title at the 2024 SAFF Women's Championship, defeating Nepal 2–1 in the final.

Chief Adviser Muhammad Yunus meets with the Bangladesh women's football team that won the 2024 SAFF Women's Championship

However, since the 2024 tournament, relations between some players and Butler worsened. In February 2025, a group of players led by Sabina Khatun boycotted a training camp, demanding Butler's resignation. The Bangladesh Football Federation (BFF) intervened and offered new contracts to players of the national team. The dispute was resolved by late March 2025.

In June–July 2025, Bangladesh took part in the 2026 AFC Women's Asian Cup qualifiers. The team secured qualification for the 2026 AFC Women's Asian Cup, their first ever for the continental tournament.

== Team image ==
=== Colours ===
The Bangladesh national football team plays in bottle green shirts and dark red shorts, with the away kit as the opposite. These national colours of Bangladesh are also represented on the Flag of Bangladesh.

=== Home stadium ===
The Bangladesh women's national team plays their home matches at the National Stadium, Dhaka, and Bir Sherestha Shaheed Shipahi Mostafa Kamal Stadium.

=== Media coverage ===
Bangladesh's both home and away matches are broadcast live on Bangladesh Television and T Sports.

=== Rivalries ===
==== India ====
Bangladesh has developed a competitive and closely watched regional rivalry with India, especially in the context of the SAFF Women's Championship. For much of the 2010s, India maintained dominance in the fixture, defeating Bangladesh in the final of the 2016 SAFF Championship and again in the semi-final of the 2019 edition. However, a turning point came during the 2022 SAFF Women's Championship, when Bangladesh defeated India 3–0 in the group stage—marking their first-ever victory over India in senior women's football and ending India's 24-match unbeaten streak in the SAFF competition since its inception in 2010. Bangladesh went on to win the 2022 SAFF title, defeating Nepal 3–1 in the final, becoming champions for the first time. This rivalry has paralleled the rapid rise of Bangladesh's women's football team. While India still leads in overall head-to-head results, Bangladesh's growing competitiveness and historic 2022 win have made this rivalry one of the most anticipated fixtures in South Asian women's football.

==== Nepal ====
The rivalry between Bangladesh and Nepal has grown steadily over the past decade, fueled by encounters in the knockout stages of the SAFF Women's Championship. While Nepal traditionally held the upper hand in earlier meetings, the balance of power has gradually shifted. The defining moment in the rivalry came in 2022, when Bangladesh defeated Nepal 3–1 in the final held in Kathmandu, capturing their first SAFF Women's Championship title and spoiling Nepal's hopes of a historic win on home soil. The match was widely seen as a turning point for Bangladeshi women's football, showcasing a fast, pressing style and a new generation of confident players nurtured through the country's youth development programs.

== Results and fixtures ==
The following is a list of match results in the last 12 months, as well as any future matches that have been scheduled.

Legend

Win Draw Lose

=== 2025 ===
26 November 2025 Bangladesh Tri-Nations Cup	Bangladesh	0–1	Malaysia	Dhaka, Bangladesh
18:00 UTC+6		Report	Nur Ainsyah Murad 29'	Stadium: National Stadium; Referee: Om Choki (Bhutan)

2 December 2025 Bangladesh Tri-Nations Cup	Bangladesh	1–2	Azerbaijan	Dhaka, Bangladesh
18:00 UTC+6	Manda 33'	Report	Jafarzade 19'; Manya 83'	Stadium: National Stadium; Referee: Om Choki (Bhutan)

=== 2026 ===
25 February 2026 Unofficial friendly	Bangladesh	1–1	(Australia) Sydney Wanderers	Sydney
03:00 BST (UTC+6)		Report		Attendance: 0 (Note: Behind closed doors)

3 March 2026 AFC Women's Asian Cup GS	Bangladesh	0–2	China	Sydney
14:00 BST (UTC+6)		Report (AFC); Report (FIFA)	Wang Shuang 44'; Zhang Rui 45+1'	Stadium: Western Sydney Stadium; Attendance: 6,006; Referee: Pansa Chaisanit (Thailand)

6 March 2026 AFC Women's Asian Cup GS	Bangladesh	0–5	North Korea	Sydney
08:00 BST (UTC+6)		Report (AFC); Report (FIFA)	Myong Yu-jong 45+5' (pen.); Kim Kyong-yong 45+7', 64'; Chae Un-yong 62'; Kim Hye-yong 90'	Stadium: Western Sydney Stadium; Attendance: 2,102; Referee: Doumouh Al Bakkar (Lebanon)

9 March 2026 AFC Women's Asian Cup GS	Bangladesh	0–4	Uzbekistan	Perth, Australia
15:00 BST (UTC+6)		Report (AFC); Report (FIFA)	Khabibullaeva 10', 62', 66'; Kudratova 88'	Stadium: Perth Rectangular Stadium; Attendance: 1,117; Referee: Mahnaz Zokaee (Iran)

11 May 2026 Unofficial friendly	Bangladesh	2–0	(Thailand) Kasem Bundit	Bangkok, Thailand
16:00 BST (UTC+6)	Anika 15'; Umehla 77'	Report		Stadium: Alpine Football Training Camm (Pitch 1); Attendance: 0 (Note: Behind closed doors)

17 May 2026 Unofficial friendly	Bangladesh	0–2	(Thailand) Bangkok WFC	Bangkok, Thailand
16:00 BST (UTC+6)		Report		Stadium: Alpine Football Training Camm (Pitch 1); Attendance: 0

29 May 2026 2026 SAFF GS	Bangladesh	4–2	Maldives	Margao, India
20:00 BST (UTC+6)	Siddiqui 1'; Marma 34'; Prity 63'; Kisku 90+5'	Report	Noora 42'; Fazla 57'	Stadium: Jawaharlal Nehru Stadium; Attendance: 127; Referee: Rachana Kamani (India)

31 May 2026 2026 SAFF GS	Bangladesh	0–3	India	Margao, India
20:00 BST (UTC+6)		Report	Xaxa 36'; Kom 78' (pen.); Prasad 90+1'	Stadium: Jawaharlal Nehru Stadium; Attendance: 553; Referee: Choki Om (Bhutan)

3 June 2026 2026 SAFF SF	Bangladesh	2–1	Nepal	Margao, India
16:30 BST (UTC+6)	R. Chakma 45+1'; P. Rai 90+3' (o.g.)	Report	Rana 22'	Stadium: Jawaharlal Nehru Stadium; Referee: Om Choki (Bhutan)

6 June 2026 2026 SAFF Final	Bangladesh	1–3	India	Margao, India
19:00 BST (UTC+6)	R. Chakma 45+1'	Report	Xaxa 42'; Nongrum 46'; Kom 82'	Stadium: Jawaharlal Nehru Stadium; Attendance: 729; Referee: Anjana Rai (Nepal)

14 September 2026 2026 Asian Games	Bangladesh	0–10	North Korea	Osaka, Japan
13:00 BST (UTC+6)		Report	Jon Ryong-Jong 5', 10'; Hwang Yu-Yong 12'; Chae Un-Yong 18', 35'; Kim Kyong-yong 40', 43'; Ri Song-a 51'; Jong Kum 60'; Han Jin-Hong 90'	Stadium: Nagai Stadium; Attendance: 1,343; Referee: Plong Pich Akara (Cambodia)

17 September 2026 2026 Asian Games	Bangladesh	0–6	South Korea	Osaka, Japan
13:00 BST (UTC+6)		Report	Kim Min-ji 16'; Jeong Da-bin 42'; Choe Yu-ri 65'; Ji So-yun 77'; Hyun Seul-gi 79'; Ko Yoo-jin 90+1'	Stadium: Nagai Stadium; Attendance: 135; Referee: Fatemeh Nasiri Looshani (Iran)

21 September 2026 2026 Asian Games	Bangladesh	0–0	Myanmar	Osaka, Japan
13:00 BST (UTC+6)				Stadium: Nagai Stadium; Attendance: 571; Referee: Roziyabonu Yusupova (Uzbekistan)

1 December 2026 Friendly	Bangladesh	v	Singapore	Bishan, Singapore
		Report		Stadium: Bishan Stadium

5 December 2026 Friendly	Bangladesh	v	Singapore	Jalan Besar, Singapore
		Report		Stadium: Jalan Besar Stadium

== Coaching staff ==
=== Current coaching staff ===
As of 27 May 2026

Position	Name
Head coach	(England) Peter James Butler
Team manager	(Bangladesh) Khalid Mahmud Nowmee
Assistant coach	(Bangladesh) Abul Hossain
Assistant coach	(Bangladesh) Lina Chakma
Goalkeeping coach	(Bangladesh) Masud Ahamad
Strength & conditioning coach	(Australia) Cameron Nicholas Lord
Media manager	(Bangladesh) Md Saeed Hasan
Physiotherapist	(Bangladesh) Jannatul Ferdous Konok
Video analyst	(Bangladesh) Mo Mehedi Hasan Siddiqui
Photographer & videographer	(Bangladesh) Anisur Rahman
Team attendant	(Bangladesh) Md Rashibul Hossen

=== Manager history ===
- (Bangladesh) Golam Robbani (2009–2014)
- (Japan) Norio Tsukitate (2014)
- (Bangladesh) Golam Robbani (2015–2023)
- (Bangladesh) Saiful Bari Titu (2023–2024)
- (England) Peter James Butler (2024–Present)

== Players ==
=== Current squad ===
The following players were called up for the final squad for the 2026 Asian Games in September 2026.

Caps and goals updated as of 1 September 2026.

No.	Pos.	Player	Date of birth (age)	Caps	Goals	Club
1	GK	Rupna Chakma	2 January 2004 (age 22)	39	0	(Bangladesh Football Federation) Rajshahi Stars
2	GK	Mile Akter	14 September 2006 (age 20)	8	0	(Bangladesh Football Federation) Bangladesh Army
3	GK	Swarna Rani Mandal	6 June 2006 (age 20)	2	0	(Bangladesh Football Federation) Rajshahi Stars
4	DF	Sheuli Azim	20 December 2001 (age 24)	51	1	(Bangladesh Football Federation) Rajshahi Stars
5	DF	Shamsunnahar Sr.	31 January 2003 (age 23)	54	0	(Bangladesh Football Federation) Farashganj SC
6	DF	Afeida Khandaker	18 November 2006 (age 19)	30	4	(Bangladesh Football Federation) Rajshahi Stars
7	DF	Kohati Kisku	5 September 2005 (age 21)	23	2	(Bangladesh Football Federation) Bangladesh Police
8	DF	Mst Surovi Akter Arfin	5 June 2008 (age 18)	4	0	(Bangladesh Football Federation) Bangladesh Army
9	DF	Arpita Biswas	7 May 2009 (age 17)	0	0	(Bangladesh Football Federation) Bangladesh Army
10	DF	Unnati Khatun	30 December 2005 (age 20)	1	0	(Bangladesh Football Federation) Bangladesh Army
11	MF	Airin Khatun	10 January 2005 (aged 21)	0	0	(Bangladesh Football Federation) Bangladesh Police
12	DF	Nabiran Khatun	18 December 2006 (aged 19)	3	0	(Bangladesh Football Federation) BKSP
13	MF	Monika Chakma	15 September 2003 (age 23)	45	4	(Bangladesh Football Federation) Farashganj SC
14	MF	Mst Momita Khatun	1 December 2009 (age 16)	4	0	(Bangladesh Football Federation) Bangladesh Army
15	MF	Maria Manda (C)	10 May 2003 (age 23)	53	1	(Bangladesh Football Federation) Farashganj SC
16	MF	Anika Rania Siddiqui	25 May 2005 (age 21)	7	1	Free agent
17	MF	Munki Akhter	5 December 2008 (aged 17)	14	1	(Bangladesh Football Federation) Rajshahi Stars
18	FW	Tohura Khatun	5 May 2003 (age 23)	40	15	(Bangladesh Football Federation) Farashganj SC
19	FW	Ritu Porna Chakma	30 December 2003 (age 22)	42	15	(Myanmar Football Federation) Ayeyawady
20	FW	Shaheda Akter Ripa	8 December 2005 (age 20)	24	1	(Bangladesh Football Federation) Rajshahi Stars
21	FW	Mst Sagorika	1 December 2007 (age 18)	17	5	(Bangladesh Football Federation) Bangladesh Police
22	FW	Shamsunnahar Jr.	30 March 2004 (age 22)	38	8	(Bangladesh Football Federation) Farashganj SC
23	FW	Most Sultana	18 May 2002 (aged 23)	9	0	(Bangladesh Football Federation) Bangladesh Army

=== Recent call-ups ===
The following players have been called up for the team in the last 12 months.

Pos.	Player	Date of birth (age)	Caps	Goals	Club	Latest call-up
DF	Ruma Akter	28 November 2006 (age 19)	0	0	(Bangladesh) Siraj Srity Songsod	v. Thailand, 27 October 2025
DF	Joynob Bibi Rita	1 January 2007 (age 19)	6	0	Bangladesh Army	v. Azerbaijan, 2 December 2025
FW	Mamoni Chakma	11 February 2009 (age 17)	1	0	(Bangladesh) Ansar & VDP	v. Azerbaijan, 2 December 2025
FW	Sinha Jahan Shikha	5 November 2007 (age 19)	1	0	Bangladesh Army	v. Azerbaijan, 2 December 2025
^{INJ} Withdrew due to injury^{PRE} Preliminary squad^{SUS} Suspended^{RET} Retired

=== Captains ===
- Trishna Chakma (2009–2012)
- Suinu Pru Marma (2012–2014)
- Aungmraching Marma (2014–2015)
- Sabina Khatun (2015–2024)
- Afeida Khandaker (2025–2026)
- Maria Manda (2026–Present)

== Records ==
As of 6 June 2025

*Players in bold are still active with Bangladesh.

=== Most capped players ===
Rank	Name	Caps	Goals	Position	Career
1	Sabina Khatun	61	38	FW	2009–2024
2	Shamsunnahar	54	0	DF	2016–
3	Maria Manda	53	1	MF	2016–
4	Sheuli Azim	51	1	DF	2014–
5	Monika Chakma	45	4	MF	2019–
6	Masura Parvin	44	3	DF	2014–2024
7	Ritu Porna Chakma	42	15	FW	2021–
8	Tohura Khatun	40	15	FW	2018–
9	Rupna Chakma	39	0	GK	2019–
10	Shamsunnahar Jr.	38	8	FW	2021–

=== Top goalscorers ===
Rank	Player	Goals	Caps	Ratio	Career
1	**Sabina Khatun**	38	61	0.62	2009–2024
2	**Tohura Khatun**	15	40	0.38	2018–
3	**Ritu Porna Chakma**	15	42	0.36	2021–
4	**Krishna Rani Sarkar**	11	33	0.33	2014–2024
5	Sirat Jahan Shopna	10	25	0.4	2014–2022
6	**Shamsunnahar Jr.**	8	38	0.21	2020–
7	Aungmraching Marma	5	19	0.26	2009–2015
7	Suinu Pru Marma	5	20	0.25	2009–2014
9	**Mst. Sagorika**	5	17	0.29	2024–
9	**Afeida Khandaker**	4	32	0.13	2023–
9	**Monika Chakma**	4	45	0.09	2019–

== Competitive record ==
=== FIFA Women's World Cup ===
FIFA Women's World Cup record									Qualification record						
Year	Result	Pld	W	D	L	GF	GA	GD	Pld	W	D	L	GF	GA	GD
(China) 1991 to (Germany) 2011	Did not exist								Did not exist						
(Canada) 2015	Did not qualify								Via AFC Women's Asian Cup						
(France) 2019	Did not enter								Did not enter						
(Australia) (New Zealand) 2023	Did not qualify								Via AFC Women's Asian Cup						
(Brazil) 2027	To be determined								Via AFC Women's Asian Cup						
(Costa Rica) (Jamaica) (Mexico) (United States) 2031	To be determined								To be determined						
(United Kingdom) 2035	To be determined								To be determined						
Total	0/9	–	–	–	–	–	–	–	–	–	–	–	–	–	–

=== Olympic Games ===
Summer Olympics record									Qualification record						
Year	Round	Pld	W	D*	L	GF	GA	GD	Pld	W	D*	L	GF	GA	GD
(United States) 1996 to (China) 2008	Did not exist								Did not exist						
(United Kingdom) 2012	Did not qualify								2	0	0	2	0	6	−6
(Brazil) 2016	Did not enter														
(Japan) 2020	Did not qualify								3	0	1	2	2	13	−11
(France) 2024	Withdrew from qualification								Withdrew						
(United States) 2028	To be determined								To be determined						
(Australia) 2032	To be determined								To be determined						
Total	0/8	–	–	–	–	–	–	–	5	0	1	4	2	19	−18

*Denotes draws includes knockout matches decided on penalty kicks.

=== AFC Women's Asian Cup ===
AFC Women's Asian Cup record									Qualification record						
Year	Result	GP	W	D*	L	GS	GA	GD	GP	W	D*	L	GS	GA	GD
(Hong Kong) 1975 to (China) 2010	Did not exist								Did not exist						
(Vietnam) 2014	Did not qualify								3	0	0	3	0	15	−15
(Jordan) 2018	Did not enter								Did not enter						
(India) 2022	Did not qualify								2	0	0	2	0	10	−10
(Australia) 2026	Group stage	3	0	0	3	0	11	−11	3	3	0	0	16	1	+15
(Uzbekistan) 2029	To be determined								To be determined						
Total:1/21	Group stage	3	0	0	3	0	11	-11	8	3	0	5	16	26	−10

*Draws include knockout matches decided on penalty kicks.

=== Asian Games ===
Asian Games record
Year	Result	Position	GP	W	D*	L	GF	GA	GD
(China) 1990 to (Qatar) 2006	Did not exist								
(China) 2010	Did not enter								
(South Korea) 2014	Did not enter								
(Indonesia) 2018	Did not enter								
(China) 2022	Group stage	12th	3	0	1	2	2	15	−13
(Japan) 2026	Group stage	11th	3	0	1	2	0	16	−16
(Qatar) 2030	To be determined								
(Saudi Arabia) 2034	To be determined								
Total	2/20	11th	6	0	1	5	2	31	−29

*Draws include knockout matches decided on penalty kicks.

=== SAFF Women's Championship ===
SAFF Women's Championship records
Host Year	Result	GP	W	D*	L	GF	GA	GD
(Bangladesh) 2010	Semi-final	4	2	0	2	11	9	+2
(Sri Lanka) 2012	Group stage	3	1	0	2	2	5	−3
(Pakistan) 2014	Semi-final	4	2	0	2	10	8	+2
(India) 2016	Runners-up	4	2	1	1	13	3	+10
(Nepal) 2019	Semi-final	3	1	0	2	2	7	−5
(Nepal) 2022	Champion	5	5	0	0	23	1	+22
(Nepal) 2024	Champion	4	3	1	0	11	3	+7
(India) 2026	Runners-up	4	2	0	2	7	8	−1
Total	8/8	31	18	2	11	79	45	+34

*Draws include knock-out matches decided on penalty kicks.

=== South Asian Games ===
South Asian Games record
Year	Result	GP	W	D*	L	GF	GA	GD
(Bangladesh) 2010	Bronze medal	4	2	0	2	3	8	–5
(India) 2016	Bronze medal	4	2	0	2	5	9	–4
Total	2/2	8	4	0	4	8	17	−9

*Draws include knockout matches decided on penalty kicks.

As of 22 September 2021

== Head-to-head record ==
As of 21 September 2026

Against	Region	P	W	D	L	GF	GA	GD	%Win
Afghanistan	AFC	2	2	0	0	12	1	+11	100.00
Azerbaijan	UEFA	1	0	0	1	1	2	−1	0.00
Bahrain	AFC	1	1	0	0	7	0	+7	100.00
Bhutan	AFC	8	8	0	0	43	4	+39	100.00
China	AFC	1	0	0	1	0	2	−2	0.00
Chinese Taipei	AFC	2	0	0	2	0	5	−5	0.00
Hong Kong	AFC	1	1	0	0	5	0	+5	100.00
India	AFC	14	2	1	11	11	50	−39	14.29
Indonesia	AFC	1	0	1	0	0	0	+0	0.00
Iran	AFC	2	0	0	2	0	7	−7	0.00
Jordan	AFC	2	0	1	1	2	7	−5	0.00
Malaysia	AFC	4	1	1	2	7	3	+4	25.00
Maldives	AFC	5	5	0	0	18	3	+15	100.00
Myanmar	AFC	3	1	1	1	2	6	−4	33.33
Nepal	AFC	14	3	5	6	11	19	−8	21.43
North Korea	AFC	2	0	0	2	0	15	−15	0.00
Pakistan	AFC	3	2	1	0	8	1	+7	66.67
Philippines	AFC	1	0	0	1	0	4	−4	0.00
Singapore	AFC	3	2	0	1	11	3	+8	66.67
South Korea	AFC	1	0	0	1	0	6	−6	0.00
Sri Lanka	AFC	4	3	0	1	7	3	+4	75.00
Thailand	AFC	3	0	0	3	1	17	−16	0.00
Turkmenistan	AFC	1	1	0	0	7	0	+7	100.00
United Arab Emirates	AFC	2	0	0	2	2	6	−4	0.00
Uzbekistan	AFC	2	0	0	2	0	7	−7	0.00
Vietnam	AFC	1	0	0	1	1	6	−5	0.00
Total	26 nations	84	32	11	41	156	177	−21	38.10

Source: Results

== Honours ==
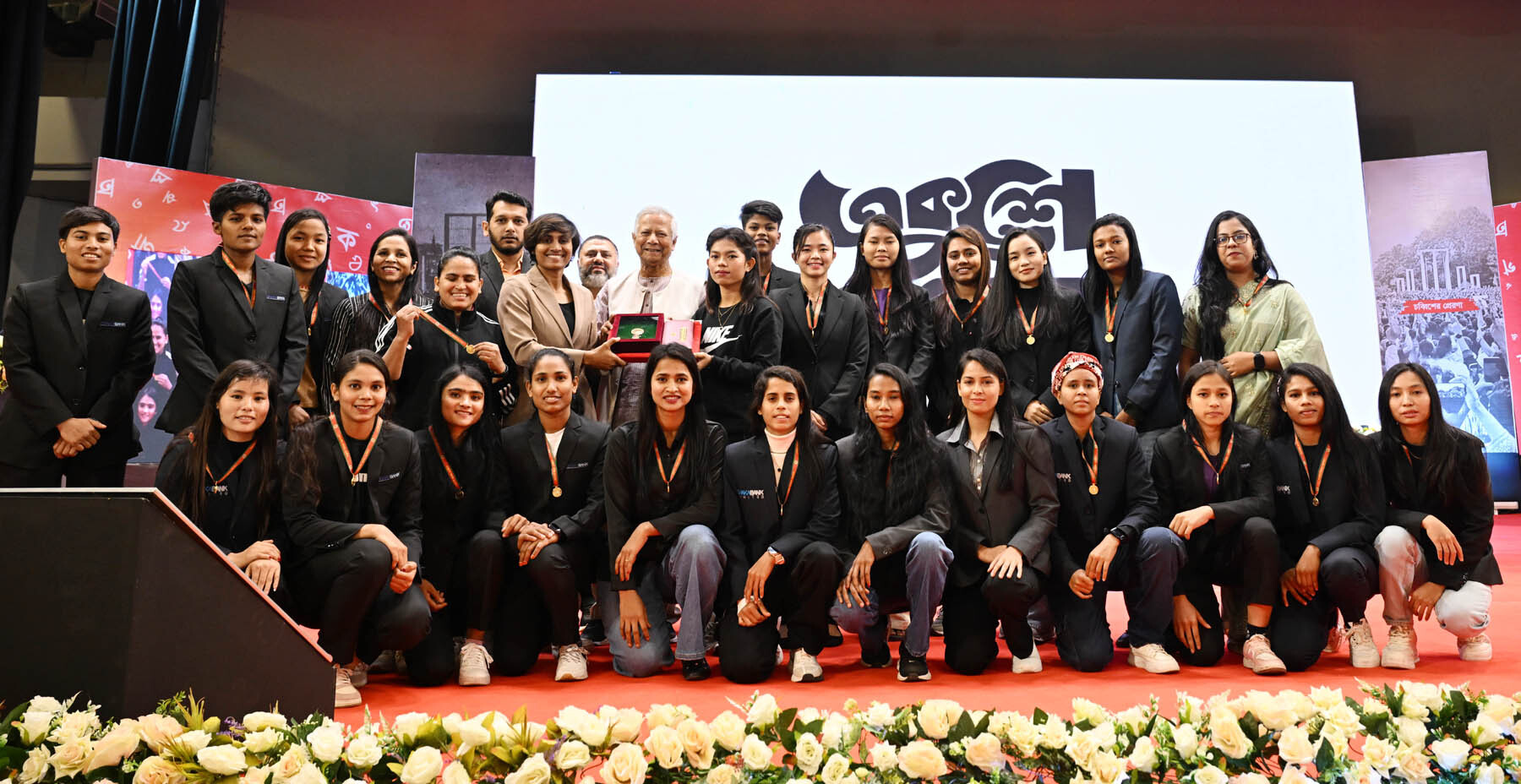
Muhammad Yunus awarding the Ekushey Padak to Bangladesh women's national team

=== Regional ===
- SAFF Women's Championship
  - Champion: 2022, 2024
  - Runner-up: 2016, 2026

=== National ===
- Ekushey Padak: 2025

== See also ==
- Sport in Bangladesh
- Women's football in Bangladesh
- Bangladesh Football Federation
- Bangladesh women's national football team results
- Bangladesh women's national under-20 football team
- Bangladesh women's national under-17 football team
- Bangladesh men's national team
