= Sanfida Nongrum =

Indian football player

Personal information
- Date of birth: 25 April 2005 (age 21)
- Place of birth: Shillong, Meghalaya, India
- Height: 1.61 m (5 ft 3 in)
- Position: Midfielder

Team information
- Current team: Garhwal United
- Number: 10

Youth career
- Kick Start FCC

Senior career*
Years	Team	Apps	(Gls)
- Royal Wahingdoh
2020–2021	Bangalore United FC		
2021–2022	Sirvodem SC		
2022–2023	Sports Odisha		
2023–	Garhwal United		
2025–2026	→ Misaka United FC (loan)		

International career^{‡}
2026–	India	9	(3)
- * Club domestic league appearances and goals ‡ National team caps and goals as of 11 October 2026

Sanfida Nongrum (born 25 April 2005) is an Indian professional footballer from Meghalaya, who plays as a midfielder for the Indian Women's League club Garhwal United and the India women's national football team.

== Early life ==
Nongrum hails from Shillong.

== Career ==
She was the captain of the Garhwal United which won the Indian Women's League 2 in the 2024–25 season. She is also the captain of the Garhwal United in 2025. In 2024, she led the Laitkor club clinch the Women's Football League title in Meghalaya. She also played for Bangalore United, Sports Odisha and Sirvodem SC, and has also played for the Meghalaya sub-junior girls' team. In the Senior Women's National Football Championship, she represented Delhi.

In the 2025–26 season of the Karnataka Women's League, she was named Player of the Tournament being the top scorer with 15 goals.

=== International ===
She made her senior India debut in the AFC Women's Asia Cup at Perth, Australia on 4 March 2026 and scored a goal in the debut match against Vietnam in the first match of Group C. Thus, she became the first player from Meghalaya to earn a senior India cap.

== Career statistics ==
=== International ===
As of 11 October 2026

National team	Year	Caps	Goals
India	2026	9	3
Total		9	3

Scores and results list India's goal tally first.

List of international goals scored by Sanfida Nongrum
No.	Date	Venue	Opponent	Score	Result	Competition
1.	4 March 2026	Perth Rectangular Stadium, Perth, Australia	Vietnam	1–1	1–2	2026 AFC Women's Asian Cup
2.	3 June 2026	Jawaharlal Nehru Stadium, Margao, India	Bhutan	1–0	1–0	2026 SAFF Women's Championship
3.	6 June 2026	Jawaharlal Nehru Stadium, Margao, India	Bangladesh	2–1	3–1	2026 SAFF Women's Championship

== Honours ==
India

- SAFF Women's Championship: 2026
