= Malavika Prasad =

Indian footballer

Malavika P.
Personal information
- Full name: Malavika Prasad
- Date of birth: 12 November 2003 (age 22)
- Place of birth: Kasaragod, Kerala, India
- Height: 1.63 m (5 ft 4 in)
- Position: Forward

Team information
- Current team: Sethu
- Number: 11

Youth career
- 2017–2019: Kerala

Senior career*
Years	Team	Apps	(Gls)
2019–2020	Misaka United FC		
2021	Travancore Royals FC		
2021–2022	Kemp		
2022	ASOS Rainbow		
2022–2023	Kerala Blasters		
2024–	Sethu		

International career^{‡}
2025–	India	13	(2)
- * Club domestic league appearances and goals ‡ National team caps and goals as of 11 October 2026

Malavika Prasad (born 12 November 2003) is an Indian professional footballer from Kerala, who plays as a forward for the Indian Women's League club Sethu and the India women's national football team.

== Early life and career ==
Malavika is from Kasaragod, Kerala. Before joining Sethu FC, she played for Kerala Blasters FC, ASOS Rainbow Athletic Club, Kemp Football Club, Travancore Royals Football Club and Misaka United FC. She also represented the Kerala State sub–junior girls team in 2018–2019 and 2017–18. With lack of proper grounds to practice and short of funds, Kerala Blasters stopped the activities of their women's team in 2023 for some time and she moved on to the Madurai club, Sethu FC for the next season.

She is named in the 32–Indian probables list for the National camp at Anantapur, Andhra Pradesh by chief coach Crispin Chettri, ahead of the Pink Ladies Cup to be held in UAE in February 2025.

=== Senior India debut ===
Malavika made her Senior India debut in the first of the two FIFA Women's International Friendlies against Uzbekistan played on 30 May 2025 at the Padukone-Dravid Centre for Sports Excellence stadium, Bengaluru.

=== Awards ===
In July 2024, she was presented the Kerala Football Association's Best Player award in the female category.

== Career statistics ==
=== International ===
As of 11 October 2026

National team	Year	Caps	Goals
India	2025	5	1
India	2026	8	1
Total		13	2

Scores and results list India's goal tally first.

List of international goals scored by Malavika Prasad
No.	Date	Venue	Opponent	Score	Result	Competition
1.	23 June 2025	700th Anniversary Stadium, Chiang Mai, Thailand	Mongolia	10–0	13–0	2026 AFC Women's Asian Cup qualification
2.	31 May 2026	Jawaharlal Nehru Stadium, Margao, India	Bangladesh	3–0	3–0	2026 SAFF Women's Championship

== Honours ==
India

- SAFF Women's Championship: 2026
