= India women's national football team =

Women's national football team representing India

India
- Nicknames: The Blue Tigresses
- Association: All India Football Federation (AIFF)
- Confederation: AFC (Asia)
- Sub-confederation: SAFF (South Asia)
- Head coach: Crispin Chettri
- Captain: Sweety Devi Ngangbam
- Most caps: Ashalata Devi Loitongbam (100)
- Top scorer: Bala Devi Ngangom (48)
- FIFA code: IND
First colours	Second colours

FIFA ranking
- Current: 69 (20 October 2026)
- Highest: 49 (December 2013)
- Lowest: 70 (June 2025)

First international
- As India S: India S 2–0 Hong Kong (Calicut, India; 12 January 1980); As India: India 5–0 Singapore (Hong Kong; 7 June 1981)

Biggest win
- India 18–0 Bhutan (Cox's Bazar, Bangladesh; 13 December 2010)

Biggest defeat
- India 0–16 China (Bangkok, Thailand; 11 December 1998)

Asian Cup
- Appearances: 10 (first in 1980)
- Best result: Runners-up (1980, 1983)

Asian Games
- Appearances: 3 (first in 1998)
- Best result: Group stage (1998, 2014, 2022)

SAFF Championship
- Appearances: 7 (first in 2010)
- Best result: Champions (2010, 2012, 2014, 2016, 2019, 2026)
Medal record
AFC Asian Cup
Silver medal – second place	1980 India
Silver medal – second place	1983 Thailand
Bronze medal – third place	1981 Hong Kong
SAFF Championship
Gold medal – first place	2010 Bangladesh
Gold medal – first place	2012 Sri Lanka
Gold medal – first place	2014 Pakistan
Gold medal – first place	2016 India
Gold medal – first place	2019 Nepal
Gold medal – first place	2026 India
South Asian Games
Gold medal – first place	2010 Dhaka	Team
Gold medal – first place	2016 Guwahati & Shillong	Team
Gold medal – first place	2019 Kathmandu & Pokhara	Team

The India women's national football team represents India in women's international football and is governed by the All India Football Federation. Under the global jurisdiction of FIFA and governed in Asia by the AFC. India is also part of the South Asian Football Federation. The team was one of the best in Asia in the mid-1970s to early 1980s, when they became runners-up in the 1979 and the 1983 AFC Women's Asian Cup. The Indian women's national team is yet to participate in the FIFA Women's World Cup and the Olympic Games.

== History ==
=== Golden years (1975–1991) ===
Football for women in Asia started later compared to their male counterparts. The seed of women's football in India was planted in the early 1970s. The first manager was Sushil Bhattacharya, in 1975 and from 1975 until 1991, the administration of the game was in the hands of the Women's Football Federation of India (WFFI), which comes under the Asian Ladies' Football Confederation (ALFC) that had recognition from neither FIFA nor AFC. Both organizations continuously tried to dissuade Asian countries from sending teams to these tournaments, for which the first few editions of AFC Women's Asian Cup seen very few teams. Thus, the 1980 featured two Indian teams (India N & India S), Western Australia, Taiwan, Hong Kong and Malaysia. India did well enough in all these tournaments under Sushil Bhattacharya. In the next edition of 1981 India achieved third position, defeated by Thailand, and became runners-up in the 1983, edition losing to Thailand again. This was the best chapter for the Indian women team in the Asian platform as since 1983 the performance declined along with mismanagement in the federation. The game was administered by WFFI from 1975 until the early 1990s, when they were absorbed into the AIFF.

=== Decline (1991–2009) ===
The AIFF did very less to lift the women's football from their meager condition. It was the time when FIFA conceptualized and organised FIFA Women's World Cup in 1991 and International Olympic Committee started the women's competition at 1996 Summer Olympics. Time and again, the AIFF officials stated that lifting the standard of women's football to the level of their Asian counterparts was their chief aim. The AIFF failed to sponsor the team's first foreign trip in 1997 to Germany before the Asian Championships. Eventually, the trip was made possibly with the help of the German Football Association and NRI's living in Germany.

1998 Asian Games was first participation for the national team. They were defeated by Chinese Taipei 1–13, before facing the biggest defeat in the history by China PR with an embarrassing scoreline of 0–16.

The women's game reached a new low in June 2009 when FIFA delisted the side from its world rankings, for being out of action for more than 18 months. From 1991 to 2010 the performance of the Indian team was very poor, participating in just 5 editions.

=== Resurgence (2010–2021) ===
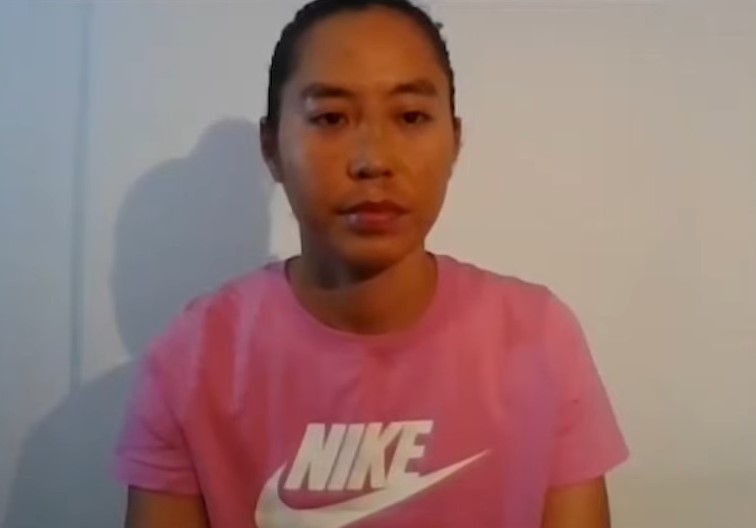
Ngangom Bala Devi, all-time leading goalscorer for India.

After 2009 sanction by FIFA, the AIFF started to better the condition of the national team and women's football, which led to commencing SAFF Women's Championship and also including women's football in the South Asian Games. The women's team resumed playing on 29 January 2010 after nearly a year-long hiatus. Indian team earn massive success in SAFF competitions, winning the SAFF Women's Championship four times in a row without losing a single game. Additionally, they won two gold medals at South Asian Games.

They participated in the qualifiers for the 2012 Summer Olympics in March 2011. In their first match India has beaten group hosts Bangladesh 3–0. In the second round India played Uzbekistan, where they tied the first match 1–1, but lost the second leg 1–5.

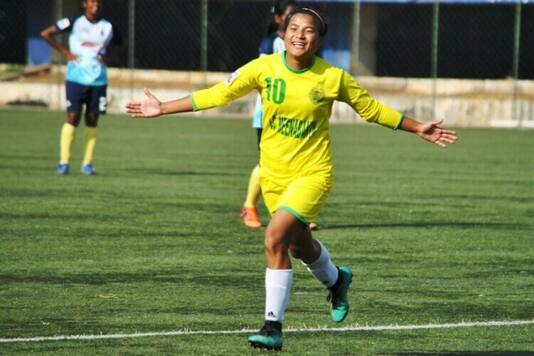
Nongmaithem Ratanbala Devi, one of the most capped midfielders for India.

India participated for the second time at the Asian games in 2014, but the condition was not better than the previous participation, 16 years back in 1998. Though India defeated Maldives easily with 15–0 score, a similar fate was faced by them in the next two matches, being defeated by South Korea and Thailand with the same score of 0–10.

In August 2018, Indian women national team was invited to participate in Cotif Tournament where clubs and national and autonomous teams participate every year since 1984, held at Valencia, Spain. 2018 Cotif was 35th Anniversary of the tournament. At this tournament they faced 3 Spanish club teams and Morocco. First lost to Fundación Albacete, 1–4, then to Levante UD, 0–5, then the Moroccan side defeated India with a score 5–1, but on the last match India played with maturity, though lost to Madrid CFF with 0–1 score.

In November 2018, India qualified to the second round of 2020 AFC Women's Olympic Qualifying Tournament for the first time since the qualifying tournament started for the 2008 Summer Olympics.

For preparation of 2020 Olympics 2nd round qualifiers India played two matches each against Hong Kong and Indonesia winning all four of them 5–2 & 1–0 against Hong Kong and 3–0 & 2–0 against Indonesia respectively. Following these matches India played at the 2019 Gold Cup organised at home, where they won their first match against Iran by 1–0 but lost next two matches to Nepal and Myanmar by 1–2 and 0–2 respectively and failed to reach the final.

=== 2022 onwards ===
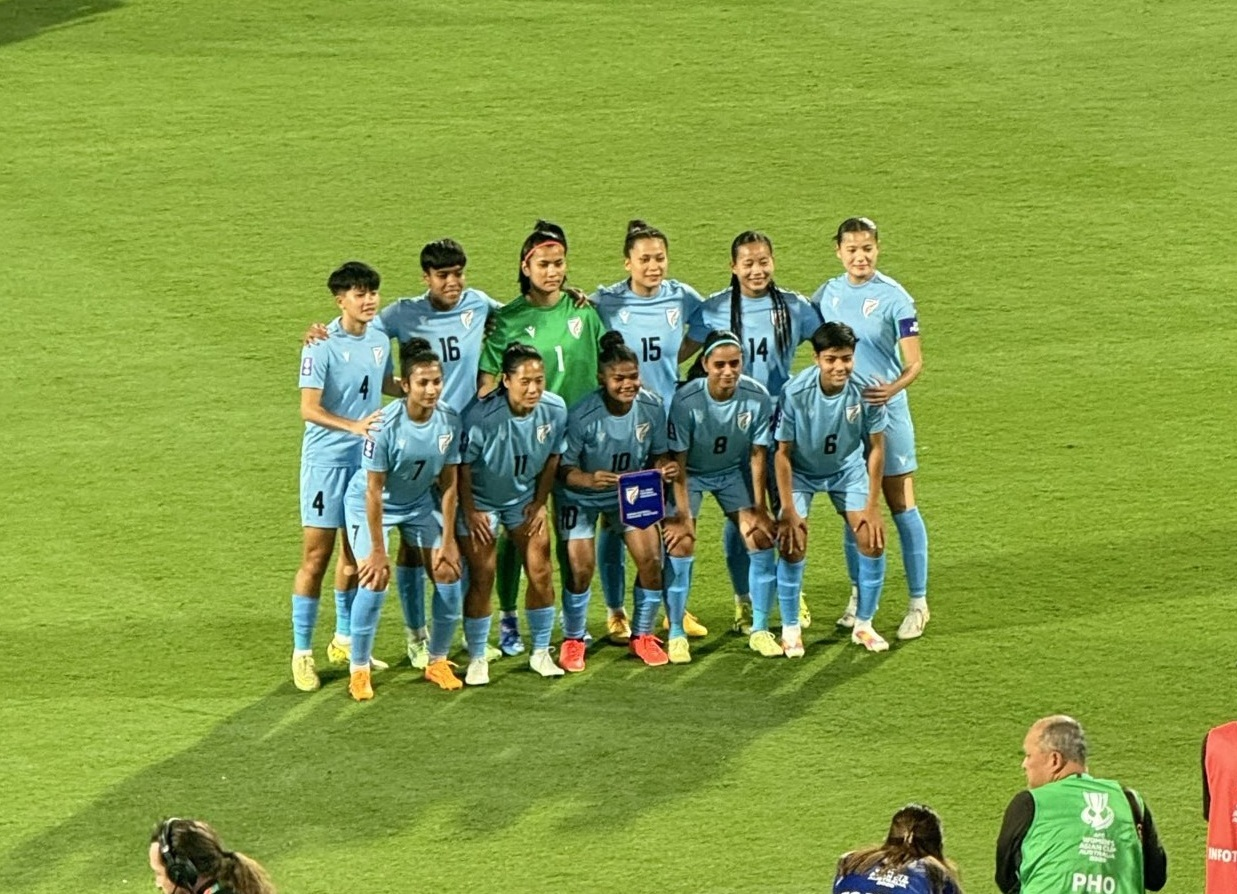
India playing XI vs Vietnam at the 2026 AFC Asian Cup.

India returned to the AFC Women's Championship, now known as the AFC Women's Asian Cup, when it hosted the 2022 edition. They last appeared in 2003, before qualifiers was introduced since the 2006 edition. However India was forced to withdraw from the 2022 tournament it is hosting due to a COVID-19 outbreak within the team.

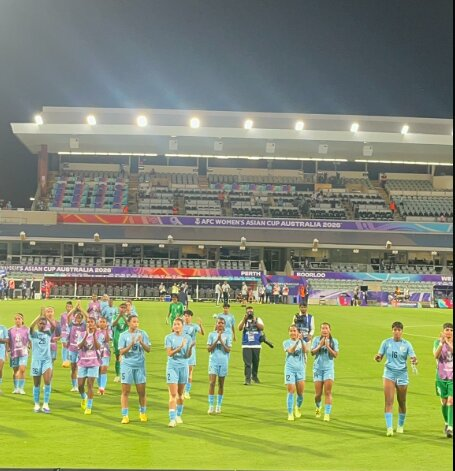
Blue tigresses appreciating the fans for supporting during the 2026 Asian Cup match against Vietnam in Perth, Australia.

At the 2022 SAFF Women's Championship, India lost a match at the regional tournament for the first time. They lost against Bangladesh 0–3 in the group stage. The team also lost the semifinal against Nepal 0–1. Thus failing to win the SAFF title for the first time ever.

In July 2025, India secured a berth at the AFC Women's Asian Cup for the first time via qualification. India defeated group qualifiers host Thailand 2–1 to earn a berth at the 2026 edition set to be hosted in Australia. Head coach Crispin Chettri noted the distinct challenges in managing a women’s team, emphasizing injury risks and physiological considerations.

== Results and fixtures ==
The following is a list of match results in the last 12 months, as well as any future matches that have been scheduled.

Legend

Win Draw Loss Fixture Void or Postponed

=== 2026 ===
4 March 2026 AFC Women's Asian Cup	Vietnam	2–1	India	Perth, Australia
16:30 (IST)	Ngân Thị Vạn Sự 30', 90+4'	AIFF; FIFA	Nongrum 52'	Stadium: Perth Rectangular Stadium; Attendance: 1,961; Referee: Kim Yu-jeong (South Korea)

7 March 2026 AFC Women's Asian Cup	India	0–11	Japan	Perth, Australia
16:30 (IST)		AIFF; FIFA	Yamamoto 4'; Hasegawa 13'; Miyazawa 20', 35', 81'; Seike 45+5', 55'; Ueki 47', 50', 65'; Hijikata 62'	Stadium: Perth Rectangular Stadium; Attendance: 3,233; Referee: Veronika Bernatskaia (Kyrgyzstan)

10 March 2026 AFC Women's Asian Cup	India	1–3	Chinese Taipei	Sydney, Australia
14:30 (IST)	Kalyan 39'	AIFF; FIFA	Su Yu-hsuan 12'; Elangbam 45+9' (o.g.); Chen Yu-chin 77'	Stadium: Western Sydney Stadium; Attendance: 3,648; Referee: Casey Reibelt (Australia)

11 April 2026 FIFA Series SF	Kenya	2–0	India	Nairobi, Kenya
20:30 IST	Amnyolet 2'; Engesha 57'	Report (FIFA); Report (AIFF)		Stadium: Nyayo National Stadium; Referee: Josephine Nantongo (Uganda)

15 April 2026 FIFA Series Third Place Play-Off	India	3–2	Malawi	Nairobi, Kenya
16:30 IST	Oraon 18'; A. Singh 45+1'; Selladurai 84'	Report (FIFA); Report (AIFF)	Khumalo 43'; Henry 60'	Stadium: Nyayo National Stadium; Referee: Yordanos Mulugeta (Ethiopia)

25 May 2026 2026 SAFF GS	Maldives	0–11	India	Margao, India
19:30		Report	Naorem 10', 17'; Xaxa 29'; A. Singh 34', 66', 70', 86'; Dangmei 39'; Shirvoikar 52', 68'; Basfore 60'	Stadium: Jawaharlal Nehru Stadium; Attendance: 225; Referee: Sharaban Tahura (Bangladesh)

31 May 2026 2026 SAFF GS	India	3–0	Bangladesh	Margao, India
19:30	Xaxa 36'; Kom 78' (pen.); Prasad 90+1'	Report		Stadium: Jawaharlal Nehru Stadium; Attendance: 553; Referee: Choki Om (Bhutan)

3 June 2026 2026 SAFF SF	India	1–0	Bhutan	Margao, India
20:00	Nongrum 58'	Report		Stadium: Jawaharlal Nehru Stadium; Attendance: 324; Referee: Yapa Appuhamilage Pabasara Minisaraniyapa (Sri Lanka)

6 June 2026 2026 SAFF Final	Bangladesh	1–3	India	Margao, India
18:30	R. Chakma 45+1'	Report	Xaxa 42'; Nongrum 46'; Kom 82'	Stadium: Jawaharlal Nehru Stadium; Attendance: 729; Referee: Anjana Rai (Nepal)

8 October Friendly	India	0–4	Russia	Kolkata, India
18:00 (IST)		AIFF; RFU	Sheina 41'; Petukhova 60', 65'; Svistunova 81'	Stadium: Kishore Bharati Krirangan; Referee: Virendha Rai (Bhutan)

11 October Friendly	India	0–8	Russia	Kolkata, India
18:00 (IST)		AIFF; RFU	Ishmukhametova 21', 43' (pen.); Achoian 25', 45+1'; Kishmakhova 29'; Mashina 50', 51'; Semenova 74'	Stadium: Kishore Bharati Krirangan; Referee: Virendha Rai (Bhutan)

== Team staff ==
As of April 2026

Position	Name	Ref
Head coach	(India) Crispin Chettri	
Assistant coaches	(India) Sujata Kar (India) Nivetha Ramadoss	
Goalkeeping coach	(India) Mario Aguiar	
Strength and conditioning coach	(India) Amit Yadav	
Physiotherapist	(India) Asmin Dsouza (India) Sadhvi Koyande	
Doctor	(India) Harleen Uppal	
Team manager	(India) Anjali Devi Mekala	
Media manager	(India) Akhil Rawat	
Team Director	(India) Subrata Paul	

=== Manager history ===
As of 11 October 2026, after the match against Russia.

Name	Years	Played	Won	Draw	Lost	Win %
(India) Sushil Bhattacharya	1975	–	–	–	–	–
(India) Jagannath Krishnaswamy	1979–1980	5	2	2	1	40
(India) N. S. Thapar	1981	5	3	1	1	60
unknown	1983	6	4	0	2	66.67
unknown	1986	2	1	0	1	50
(India) Isaiah Arumainayagam	1994	3	0	0	3	0
unknown	1995	3	0	0	3	0
unknown	1997	3	2	0	1	66.67
(India) S. Arumainayagam	1998	3	0	0	3	0
(India) Harjinder Singh	1999, 2005−2007	11	2	0	9	22.22
(India) P. K. Kabui	2001	4	1	0	3	25
(India) Ratankumar Singh Moirangthem	2003	3	1	0	2	33.33
(India) Premkanta Singh Sapam	2007	2	1	0	1	50
(India) Mohammad Shahid Jabbar	2009–2012	21	18	1	2	85.71
(India) Anadi Barua	2013	5	2	1	2	40
(India) Tarun Roy	2014	8	6	0	2	75
(India) Sajid Dar	2015–2017	15	8	3	4	53.33
(India) Maymol Rocky	2017–2021	34	18	5	11	52.94
(Sweden) Thomas Dennerby	2021–2023	21	7	3	11	33.33
(India) Suren Chettri	2022 (interim)	4	2	0	2	50
(India) Chaoba Devi Langam	2024	7	2	2	3	28.57
(India) Santosh Kashyap	2024	3	1	1	1	33.33
(Sweden) Joakim Alexandersson	2024–2025 (interim)	2	2	0	0	100
(India) Crispin Chettri	2025–present	19	10	0	9	52.63
(Costa Rica) Amelia Valverde	2026	3	0	0	3	0
Total		192	93	19	80	48.44

Note: Only International A matches considered.

== Players ==
=== Current squad ===
The following players were named in the squad for the friendlies against Russia on 8 and 11 October respectively.

Caps and goals correct as of 11 October 2026, after the match against Russia.

No.	Pos.	Player	Date of birth (age)	Caps	Goals	Club
	GK	Monalisha Devi Moirangthem	3 July 2006 (age 20)	4	0	(All India Football Federation) Sribhumi
	GK	Adrija Sarkhel	19 November 2004 (age 21)	0	0	(All India Football Federation) Nita
	GK	Nandini Mattu	6 June 2007 (age 19)	1	0	(All India Football Federation) Sethu
	DF	Ranjana Chanu Sorokhaibam	10 March 1999 (age 27)	50	4	(All India Football Federation) Kickstart
	DF	Juli Kishan	8 May 1999 (age 27)	17	0	(All India Football Federation) Nita
	DF	Purnima Kumari	10 February 2005 (age 21)	12	0	(All India Football Federation) Sethu
	DF	Kiran Pisda	16 August 2001 (age 25)	11	0	(All India Football Federation) Kickstart
	DF	Dhurga Perumal	12 October 2010 (age 16)	2	0	(All India Football Federation) Sethu
	DF	Malati Munda	15 February 2004 (age 22)	2	0	(All India Football Federation) Nita
	DF	Mousumi Murmu	26 December 2004 (age 21)	5	0	(All India Football Federation) Sribhumi
	DF	Shubhangi Singh	11 June 2006 (age 20)	2	0	(All India Football Federation) Gokulam Kerala
	MF	Sangita Basfore	12 July 1996 (age 30)	81	10	(All India Football Federation) East Bengal
	MF	Sanfida Nongrum	26 April 2005 (age 21)	9	3	(All India Football Federation) Garhwal United
	MF	Priyadharshini Selladurai	26 February 2003 (age 23)	9	3	(All India Football Federation) Gokulam Kerala
	MF	Babina Devi Lisham	1 February 2005 (age 21)	9	0	(All India Football Federation) Sethu
	MF	Babysana Devi Thingbaijam	1 February 2001 (age 25)	2	0	(All India Football Federation) Kickstart
	MF	Cindy Colney	26 March 2007 (age 19)	2	0	(All India Football Federation) Nita
	MF	Santosh	13 October 2003 (age 23)	2	0	(All India Football Federation) HOPS
	FW	Lynda Kom	28 February 2005 (age 21)	19	7	(All India Football Federation) Sethu
	FW	Malavika Prasad	12 November 2003 (age 23)	13	2	(All India Football Federation) Sethu
	FW	Renu Gour	16 January 2001 (age 25)	25	4	(All India Football Federation) Kickstart
	FW	Jasoda Munda	3 April 2001 (age 25)	8	0	(All India Football Federation) Nita
	FW	Sibani Devi Nongmeikapam	13 January 2007 (age 19)	3	1	(All India Football Federation) Sribhumi
	FW	Sushmita Jadhav	3 May 2001 (age 25)	0	0	(All India Football Federation) Sethu

=== Recent call-ups ===
The following players have also been called up to the squad within the past 12 months.

Pos.	Player	Date of birth (age)	Caps	Goals	Club	Latest call-up
GK	Panthoi Chanu Elangbam	1 February 1996 (age 30)	32	0	(India) East Bengal	2026 SAFF Women's Championship
GK	Ribansi Jamu	16 December 2008 (age 17)	2	0	(India) Garhwal United	2026 SAFF Women's Championship
GK	Shreya Hooda	25 May 1999 (age 27)	19	0	(India) Gokulam Kerala	2026 SAFF Women's Championship
GK	Sowmiya Narayanasamy	25 July 2000 (age 26)	3	0	(India) Gokulam Kerala	2026 AFC Women's Asian Cup
GK	Linthoingambi Devi Maibam	2 February 1999 (age 27)	13	0	(India) Kickstart	2026 FIFA Series
GK	Payal Basude	30 September 2003 (age 23)	2	0	(India) East Bengal	2026 AFC Asian Cup Qualifiers
DF	Astam Oraon	5 February 2005 (age 21)	13	1	(India) East Bengal	2026 SAFF Women's Championship
DF	Nirmala Devi Phanjoubam	2 March 2003 (age 23)	16	1	(India) Sethu	2026 SAFF Women's Championship
DF	Sarita Yumnam	4 February 2002 (age 24)	4	0	(India) East Bengal	2026 SAFF Women's Championship
DF	Thoibisana Chanu Toijam	7 March 2007 (age 19)	3	0	(India) Sribhumi	2026 SAFF Women's Championship
DF	Sweety Devi Ngangbam (captain)	1 December 1999 (age 26)	70	1	(India) East Bengal	2026 AFC Women's Asian Cup
DF	Sanju Yadav	12 September 1997 (age 29)	65	11	(India) Sribhumi	2026 AFC Women's Asian Cup
DF	Sushmita Lepcha	19 March 1996 (age 30)	0	0	(India) East Bengal	2026 AFC Women's Asian Cup
DF	Martina Thokchom	13 July 2004 (age 22)	18	0	(India) Sethu	2026 FIFA Series
MF	Aveka Singh	30 December 2003 (age 22)	7	5	(Denmark) Næstved	2026 SAFF Women's Championship
MF	Priyangka Devi Naorem	9 April 2003 (age 23)	18	5	(India) East Bengal	2026 SAFF Women's Championship
MF	Shilky Devi Hemam	23 November 2005 (age 20)	34	1	(India) East Bengal	2026 SAFF Women's Championship
MF	Anju Tamang	22 December 1995 (age 30)	69	15	(India) Sribhumi	2026 AFC Women's Asian Cup^{INJ}
MF	Karthika Angamuthu	1 January 2000 (age 26)	16	1	(India) East Bengal	2026 AFC Asian Cup Qualifiers
FW	Karishma Shirvoikar	4 August 2001 (age 25)	19	3	(India) Sribhumi	2026 SAFF Women's Championship
FW	Manisha Kalyan	27 November 2001 (age 24)	53	15	(Greece) AEK	2026 SAFF Women's Championship
FW	Pyari Xaxa	18 May 1997 (age 29)	47	21	(India) Nita	2026 SAFF Women's Championship
FW	Soumya Guguloth	18 January 2001 (age 25)	43	7	(India) East Bengal	2026 SAFF Women's Championship
FW	Grace Dangmei^{RET}	5 February 1996 (age 30)	96	24	(India) Sribhumi	2026 SAFF Women's Championship
FW	Kaviya Pakkirisamy	23 December 2002 (age 23)	4	0	(India) Sethu	2026 FIFA Series
FW	Rimpa Haldar	6 February 2005 (age 21)	14	2	(India) Sribhumi	2026 FIFA Series
Notes: ^{INJ} Withdrew due to injury; ^{PRE} Preliminary squad / standby; ^{RET} Retired from the national team; ^{WD} Player withdrew from the squad due to non-injury issue

=== Previous squads ===
AFC Women's Asian Cup

- 2022 AFC Women's Asian Cup
- 2026 AFC Women's Asian Cup

Asian Games

- 1998 Asian Games
- 2014 Asian Games
- 2022 Asian Games

SAFF Women's Championship

- 2016 SAFF Women's Championship
- 2026 SAFF Women's Championship

South Asian Games

- 2016 South Asian Games

== Records ==
As of 11 October 2026
Players in bold are still active, at least at club level.

=== Most capped players ===
#	Player	Year(s)	Caps	Goals
1	Ashalata Devi Loitongbam	2011–2024	100	4
2	Grace Dangmei	2013–2026	96	24
3	Bembem Devi Oinam	1995–2016	82	18
4	**Sangita Basfore**	2016–	81	10
5	**Sweety Devi Ngangbam**	2018–	70	1
6	**Anju Tamang**	2016–	69	15
7	**Sanju Yadav**	2016–	65	11
8	Indumathi Kathiresan	2014–2024	59	17
9	Bala Devi Ngangom	2007–2024	58	48
10	Aditi Chauhan	2011–2023	57	0

=== Top goalscorers ===
#	Player	Year(s)	Goals	Caps
1	Bala Devi Ngangom	2007–2024	48	58
2	Sasmita Mallik	2007–2017	36	42
3	Kamala Devi Yumnam	2011–2022	36	51
4	Grace Dangmei	2013–2026	24	96
5	**Pyari Xaxa**	2015–	21	47
6	Tababi Devi Thongam	1995–2011	19	—N/a
7	Bembem Devi Oinam	1995–2016	18	82
8	Indumathi Kathiresan	2014–2024	17	59
9	**Anju Tamang**	2016–	15	69
10	**Manisha Kalyan**	2019–	15	53

=== Captains ===
Bold indicates current captain
Reserve captains include vice-captains and others who captained in place of the incumbent in international competitive matches and friendlies

Tenure	Incumbent	Reserve captains	Major Tournaments	Ref
1980	Judy D'Silva	Chitra Gangadharan, Yolanda D'Souza	1980 AFC Women's Championship	
1981	Kuntala Ghosh Dastidar		1981 AFC Women's Championship	
1983	Shanti Mullick		1983 AFC Women's Championship	
1994–1995	unknown		1995 AFC Women's Championship	
1997	Tababi Devi Thongam		1997 AFC Women's Championship	
1998–2001	Maria Rebello	Tababi Devi Thongam	1998 Asian Games; 2001 AFC Women's Championship	
1999	Chaoba Devi Langam		1999 AFC Women's Championship	
2003; 2007; 2011–2016	Bembem Devi Oinam	Sradhanjali Samantaray, Madhu Kumari, Sujata Kar, Sasmita Mallik, Tuli Goon, Romi Devi Ashem, Bala Devi Ngangom	2003 AFC Women's Championship; 2012 SAFF Women's Championship; 2014 Asian Games; 2014 SAFF Women's Championship; 2016 South Asian Games	
2005	Sradhanjali Samantaray			
2007	Sujata Kar			
2010	Robita Devi Wangkhem		2010 South Asian Games	
2010	Tababi Devi Thongam		2010 SAFF Women's Championship	
2013	Tuli Goon			
2016–2018	Bala Devi Ngangom	Ashalata Devi Loitongbam	2016 SAFF Women's Championship	
2018–2024	Ashalata Devi Loitongbam	Aditi Chauhan, Sangita Basfore, Indumathi Kathiresan, Dalima Chhibber, Grace Dangmei, Bala Devi Ngangom, Sweety Devi Ngangbam, Sandhiya Ranganathan, Manisha Kalyan, Panthoi Chanu Elangbam	2019 SAFF Women's Championship; 2019 South Asian Games; 2022 AFC Women's Asian Cup; 2022 SAFF Women's Championship; 2024 SAFF Women's Championship	
2025–present	**Sweety Devi Ngangbam**	Sangita Basfore, Grace Dangmei, Pyari Xaxa, Shilky Devi Hemam	2026 AFC Women's Asian Cup	
2026	Grace Dangmei		2026 SAFF Women's Championship	

== Competitive record ==
=== FIFA Women's World Cup ===
FIFA Women's World Cup record									Qualification record						
Year	Result	Pld	W	D	L	GF	GA	GD	Pld	W	D	L	GF	GA	GD
(China) 1991	Did not enter								Did not enter						
(Sweden) 1995	Did not enter								Did not enter						
(United States) 1999	Did not qualify								Via AFC Women's Asian Cup						
(United States) 2003	Did not qualify								Via AFC Women's Asian Cup						
(China) 2007	Did not qualify								Via AFC Women's Asian Cup						
(Germany) 2011	Did not enter								Did not enter						
(Canada) 2015	Did not qualify								Via AFC Women's Asian Cup						
(France) 2019	Did not qualify								Via AFC Women's Asian Cup						
(Australia) (New Zealand) 2023	Withdrew from qualification								Via AFC Women's Asian Cup						
(Brazil) 2027	Did not qualify								Via AFC Women's Asian Cup						
(Costa Rica) (Jamaica) (Mexico) (United States) 2031	To be determined								To be determined						
(United Kingdom) 2035	To be determined								To be determined						
Total: 0/10	–	–	–	–	–	–	–	–	–	–	–	–	–	–	–

=== Olympic Games ===
Summer Olympics record									Qualification record						
Year	Round	Pld	W	D*	L	GF	GA	GD	Pld	W	D*	L	GF	GA	GD
(United States) 1996	Did not enter								Did not enter						
(Australia) 2000	Did not qualify								Via FIFA Women's World Cup						
(Greece) 2004	Did not enter								Did not enter						
(China) 2008	Did not qualify								2	0	0	2	0	8	−8
(United Kingdom) 2012	Did not qualify								3	1	1	1	5	6	−1
(Brazil) 2016	Did not qualify								2	1	0	1	4	7	−3
(Japan) 2020	Did not qualify								6	3	2	1	17	8	+9
(France) 2024	Did not qualify								5	2	0	3	10	13	−3
(United States) 2028	Did not qualify								Via AFC Women's Asian Cup						
(Australia) 2032	To be determined								To be determined						
Total: 0/9	–	–	–	–	–	–	–	–	18	7	3	8	36	42	−6

*Draws include knockout matches decided on penalty kicks.

=== AFC Women's Asian Cup ===
AFC Women's Asian Cup record									Qualification record						
Year	Result	Pld	W	D*	L	GF	GA	GD	Pld	W	D*	L	GF	GA	GD
(Hong Kong) 1975	Did not enter								No Qualification						
(Taiwan) 1977	Did not enter								No Qualification						
(India) 1980	Runners-up	7	4	2	1	8	3	+5	No Qualification						
(Hong Kong) 1981	Third Place	5	3	1	1	15	1	+14	No Qualification						
(Thailand) 1983	Runners-up	6	4	0	2	11	5	+6	No Qualification						
(Hong Kong) 1986	Did not enter								No Qualification						
(Hong Kong) 1989	Did not enter								No Qualification						
(Japan) 1991	Did not enter								No Qualification						
(Malaysia) 1993	Did not enter								No Qualification						
(Malaysia) 1995	Group stage	3	0	0	3	3	12	−9	No Qualification						
(China) 1997	Group stage	3	2	0	1	13	1	+12	No Qualification						
(Philippines) 1999	Group stage	4	1	0	3	3	12	−9	No Qualification						
(Chinese Taipei) 2001	Group stage	4	1	0	3	3	13	−10	No Qualification						
(Thailand) 2003	Group stage	3	1	0	2	7	14	−7	No Qualification						
(Australia) 2006	Did not qualify								3	1	0	2	13	5	+8
(Vietnam) 2008	Did not qualify								2	1	0	1	4	5	−1
(China) 2010	Did not enter								Did not enter						
(Vietnam) 2014	Did not qualify								3	0	1	2	2	5	−3
(Jordan) 2018	Did not qualify								4	1	0	3	3	25	−22
(India) 2022	Participated in the Group stage, but withdrew due to COVID-19 outbreak inside the team (Note: India failed to name the required 13 players and were unable to play their match of the group stage against Chinese Taipei due to them having only fewer than 13 players left with the remaining team members testing positive for COVID-19. They were considered to have withdrawn from the competition, and all previous matches played by them were considered "null and void" and would not be considered in determining the final group rankings.)								Qualified as hosts						
(Australia) 2026	Group stage	3	0	0	3	2	16	−14	4	4	0	0	24	1	+23
(Uzbekistan) 2029	To be determined								To be determined						
Total: 10/21	Runners-up	38	16	3	19	65	75	−10	16	7	1	8	46	41	+5

Notes:

AFC Women's Asian Cup history
Year	Round	Score	Result
1980	Round 1	India S 2–0 Western Australia	Won
1980	Round 1	India S 2–0 Hong Kong	Won
1980	Round 1	India S 0–0 Chinese Taipei	Draw
1980	Round 1	India S 1–0 India N	Won
1980	Round 1	India S 0–0 Malaysia	Draw
1980	Semi-final	India S 3–1 Hong Kong	Won
1980	Final	India S 0–2 Chinese Taipei	Loss
1981	Round 1	India 5–0 Singapore	Won
1981	Round 1	India 8–0 Philippines	Won
1981	Round 1	India 0–0 Hong Kong	Draw
1981	Semi-final	India 0–1 Thailand	Loss
1981	3rd Place	India 2–0 Hong Kong	Won
1983	Round 1	India 5–0 Philippines	Won
1983	Round 1	India 1–0 Hong Kong	Won
1983	Round 1	India 3–0 Malaysia	Won
1983	Round 1	India 1–2 Thailand	Loss
1983	Round 1	India 1–0 Singapore	Won
1983	Final	India 0–2 Thailand	Loss
1995	Round 1	India 0–1 Uzbekistan	Loss
1995	Round 1	India 0–6 Japan	Loss
1995	Round 1	India 0–5 South Korea	Loss
1997	Round 1	India 3–0 Hong Kong	Won
1997	Round 1	India 0–1 Japan	Loss
1997	Round 1	India 10–0 Guam	Won
1999	Round 1	India 0–7 North Korea	Loss
1999	Round 1	India 3–0 Malaysia	Won
1999	Round 1	India 0–3 Vietnam	Loss
1999	Round 1	India 0–3 Chinese Taipei	Loss
2001	Round 1	India 0–7 South Korea	Loss
2001	Round 1	India 0–5 Chinese Taipei	Loss
2001	Round 1	India 0–1 Thailand	Loss
2001	Round 1	India 3–0 Malaysia	Won
2003	Round 1	India 6–0 Uzbekistan	Won
2003	Round 1	India 0–12 China	Loss
2003	Round 1	India 1–2 Vietnam	Loss
2022	Round 1	India 0–0 Iran	Voided
2022	Round 1	India n/a Chinese Taipei	Cancelled
2022	Round 1	India n/a China	Cancelled
2026	Round 1	India 1–2 Vietnam	Loss
2026	Round 1	India 0–11 Japan	Loss
2026	Round 1	India 1–3 Chinese Taipei	Loss

*Draws include knockout matches decided on penalty kicks.
At 1980 AFC Asia Cup India placed two teams, India Senior (India S) and India Novice (India N), other version called as India North and India South.

=== Asian Games ===
Asian Games record
Year	Result	Pld	W	D*	L	GF	GA	GD
(China) 1990	Did not enter							
(Japan) 1994	Did not enter							
(Thailand) 1998	Group stage	3	0	0	3	1	36	−35
(South Korea) 2002	Did not enter							
(Qatar) 2006	Did not enter							
(China) 2010	Did not enter							
(South Korea) 2014	Group stage	3	1	0	2	15	20	−5
(Indonesia) 2018	Did not enter							
(China) 2022	Group stage	2	0	0	2	1	3	−2
(Japan) 2026	Did not enter							
Total: 3/10	Group stage	8	1	0	7	17	59	−42

Asian Games History
Year	Round	Score	Result
1998	Round 1	India 0–7 South Korea	Loss
1998	Round 1	India 1–13 Chinese Taipei	Loss
1998	Round 1	India 0–16 China	Loss
2014	Round 1	India 15–0 Maldives	Won
2014	Round 1	India 0–10 South Korea	Loss
2014	Round 1	India 0–10 Thailand	Loss
2022	Round 1	India 1–2 Chinese Taipei	Loss
2022	Round 1	India 0–1 Thailand	Loss

*Draws include knockout matches decided on penalty kicks.

=== SAFF Women's Championship ===
India has won the SAFF Women's Championship five times in a row.

SAFF Women's Championship record
Year	Result	Pld	W	D*	L	GF	GA	GD
(Bangladesh) 2010	Winners	5	5	0	0	40	0	+40
(Sri Lanka) 2012	Winners	5	5	0	0	33	1	+32
(Pakistan) 2014	Winners	5	5	0	0	36	1	+35
(India) 2016	Winners	4	3	1	0	11	3	+8
(Nepal) 2019	Winners	4	4	0	0	18	1	+17
(Nepal) 2022	Semi-final	4	2	0	2	12	4	+8
(Nepal) 2024	Semi-final	3	1	1	1	7	6	+1
(India) 2026	Winners	4	4	0	0	18	1	+17
Total: 8/8	Winners	34	29	2	3	175	17	+158

*Draws include knockout matches decided on penalty kicks.

=== South Asian Games ===
India has won the South Asian Games three times.

South Asian Games record
Year	Result	Pld	W	D*	L	GF	GA	GD
(Bangladesh) 2010	Winners	5	5	0	0	29	2	+27
(India) 2016	Winners	5	3	2	0	14	1	+13
(Nepal) 2019	Winners	4	4	0	0	14	0	+14
Total: 3/3	Winners	14	12	2	0	57	3	+54

*Draws include knockout matches decided on penalty kicks.

=== Other tournaments ===
Other Tournaments
Gold Cup	Turkish Women's Cup	Torneio Internacional de Futebol Feminino	Pink Ladies Cup	FIFA Series
(India) 2019: 3rd place	(Turkey) 2019: 6th place; (Turkey) 2021: Friendlies; (Turkey) 2024: (silver) Runners-up	(Brazil) 2021: 4th place	(United Arab Emirates) 2025: 4th place	(Kenya) 2026: (bronze) 3rd place

Bold Positions show best finish in the tournaments.
Red border indicates, India had hosted the games.

== Honours ==
=== Continental ===
- AFC Women's Asian Cup:
  - (silver) Runners-up (2): 1980, 1983
  - (bronze) Third Place (1): 1981

=== Regional ===
- SAFF Women's Championship:
  - (gold) Champions (6): 2010, 2012, 2014, 2016, 2019, 2026
- South Asian Games
  - (gold) Gold medal (3): 2010, 2016, 2019

== FIFA World Ranking ==
As of 11 December 2025

Best Ranking Best Mover Worst Ranking Worst Mover

India's FIFA World Ranking History
Rank	Year	Games Played	Won	Lost	Drawn	Best		Worst	
Rank	Year	Games Played	Won	Lost	Drawn	Rank	Move	Rank	Move
67	2025	12	6	6	0	63	▲7	70	▼1
69	2024	6	3	3	0	66	Steady	69	▼4
65	2023	12	2	3	7	60	▲1	65	▼4
61	2022	2	2	0	0	56	▲3	61	▼4
55	2021	12	3	9	0	55	▲2	57	▼4
53	2020	0	0	0	0	53	▲2	55	▼2
57	2019	27	17	6	4	57	▲6	63	▼1
62	2018	3	1	1	1	59	▲1	62	▼3
57	2017	7	4	0	3	56	▲4	60	▼4
54	2016	7	4	3	0	54	▲3	58	▼1
57	2015	2	1	0	1	55	Steady	57	▼2
53	2014	8	6	0	2	50	▲1	53	▼3
49	2013	5	2	1	2	49	▲1	51	Steady
52	2012	5	5	0	0	52	▲2	54	▼1
53	2011	6	3	1	2	53	▲1	54	▼2
56	2010	10	10	0	0	55	Steady	56	▼5
50	2009	0	0	0	0	50	▲2	50	▼2
52	2008	0	0	0	0	52	▲2	55	Steady
56	2007	4	1	0	3	55	▲2	57	▼1
55	2006	0	0	0	0	55	▲1	56	▼1
56	2005	3	1	0	2	56	▲2	58	▼1
58	2004	0	0	0	0	58	Steady	58	▼1
57	2003	3	1	0	2	56	Steady	57	▼3

== See also ==
- India women's under-20 team
- India women's under-17 team
- Sport in India
- Football in India
- Women's football in India
- Indian Women's League
- India women's football championship
- List of India women's national football team hat-tricks
- Women's association football around the world
