= Maldives women's national football team =

Women's national association football team representing Maldives

Maldives
- Association: Football Association of Maldives
- Confederation: AFC (Asia)
- Sub-confederation: SAFF (South Asia)
- Head coach: Mohamed Athif
- Captain: Hawwa Haneefa
- Top scorer: Fadhuwa Zahir (11)
- Home stadium: National Football Stadium
- FIFA code: MDV
First colours	Second colours	Third colours

FIFA ranking
- Current: 167 (20 October 2026)
- Highest: 91 (December 2009)
- Lowest: 167 (December 2025)

First international
- Myanmar 17–0 Maldives (Ho Chi Minh City, Vietnam; 1 October 2004)

Biggest win
- Maldives 3–0 Qatar (Malé, Maldives; 27 June 2013); Sri Lanka 2–5 Maldives (Siliguri, West Bengal; 26 December 2016)

Biggest defeat
- Myanmar 17–0 Maldives (Ho Chi Minh City, Vietnam; 1 October 2004)

SAFF Championship
- Appearances: 8 (first in 2010)
- Best result: Semifinals (2016)

The Maldives women's national football team was first formed in 2003. The team represents Maldives in international women's football and thus falls under the governance of the Football Association of Maldives. The team played its first official international match against Myanmar on 1 October 2004.

== Team image ==
=== Home stadium ===
The Maldives women's national football team plays their home matches on the Maldives National Football Stadium.

== Results and fixtures ==
The following is a list of match results in the last 12 months, as well as any future matches that have been scheduled.

Legend

Win Draw Lose Fixture

=== 2026 ===
25 May 2026 2026 SAFF GS	Maldives	0–11	India	Margao, India
19:30 (19:00 MVT UTC+5)		Report	Naorem 10', 17'; Xaxa 29'; A. Singh 34', 66', 70', 86'; Dangmei 39'; Shirvoikar 52', 68'; Basfore 60'	Stadium: Jawaharlal Nehru Stadium; Attendance: 225; Referee: Sharaban Tahura (Bangladesh)

29 May 2026 2026 SAFF GS	Bangladesh	4–2	Maldives	Margao, India
19:30 (19:00 MVT UTC+5)	Siddiqui 1'; Marma 34'; Prity 63'; Kisku 90+5'	Report	Noora 42'; Fazla 57'	Stadium: Jawaharlal Nehru Stadium; Attendance: 127; Referee: Rachana Kamani (India)

== Coaching staff ==
As of 2025

Position	Name	Ref.
Head coach	(Maldives) Mohamed Athif	
Assistant coach	(Maldives) Mariyam Mirfatah	
Assistant coach	(Maldives) Aminath Siyana	
Goalkeeping coach	(Maldives) Ahmed Fayaz	
Physical coach	(Maldives) Sheenez Mohamed	

=== Manager history ===
- (Maldives) Mohamed Athif (2018)
- (Maldives) Ahmed Nashid (2019)
- (Maldives) Mohamed Nizam (2024–2025)
- (Maldives) Mohamed Athif (2025–)

== Players ==
=== Current squad ===
- The following players were called up for the 2026 SAFF Women's Championship matches in May 2026 .

Caps and goals accurate up to and including 13 July 2021.

No.	Pos.	Player	Date of birth (age)	Caps	Goals	Club
1	GK	Fathimath Sausan				(Football Association of Maldives) Maldives Soccer Mates
18	GK	Saiga Hussain	26 March 1993 (age 33)			(Football Association of Maldives)
5	DF	Shiyana Ahmed Zuhair	1 January 1988 (age 38)			(Football Association of Maldives) Maldives Soccer Mates
6	DF	Fathimath Afza	1 November 1988 (age 38)			(Football Association of Maldives) New Radiant S.C.
8	DF	Maryam Shafa Binthi Ahmed Ali				(Football Association of Maldives)
14	DF	Hawwa Haneefa	31 January 1990 (age 36)			(Football Association of Maldives) Maziya S&RC
20	DF	Maeesha Abdul Hannan (Captain)				(Football Association of Maldives) New Radiant S.C.
22	DF	Rishma Abdullah				(Football Association of Maldives)
12	DF	Shahula Thaufeeq				(Football Association of Maldives) Maziya S&RC
7	MF	Fathimath Inaasha Adam	21 April 2001 (age 25)			(Football Association of Maldives)
13	MF	Fathimath Saliya				(Football Association of Maldives)
16	MF	Aminath Shudha				(Football Association of Maldives)
4	MF	Shahfa Shiuth				(Football Association of Maldives) New Radiant S.C.
9	MF	Safiyya Rafa	9 April 1998 (age 28)			(Football Association of Maldives) Maldives Soccer Mates
11	MF	Aishath Siuna				(Football Association of Maldives)
10	FW	Mariyam Noora	4 September 2002 (age 24)			(Football Association of Maldives) New Radiant S.C.
17	FW	Mariyam Rifa	29 August 1992 (age 34)			(Football Association of Maldives)
19	FW	Raniya Ibrahim	6 April 2005 (age 21)			(Football Association of Maldives) Maldives Soccer Mates
21	FW	Aminath Fazla				(Football Association of Maldives) New Radiant S.C.
3	FW	Aishath Raveena				(Football Association of Maldives)
23		Farah Ahmed				(Football Association of Maldives)

=== Recent call-ups ===
The following players have been called up to a squad in the past 12 months.

Pos.	Player	Date of birth (age)	Caps	Goals	Club	Latest call-up

=== Previous squads ===
Asian Games

- 2018 Asian Games – squads

== Records ==
Active players in bold, statistics correct as of 2020.

=== Most capped players ===
#	Player	Year(s)	Caps

=== Top goalscorers ===
#	Player	Year(s)	Goals	Caps

== Competitive record ==
=== FIFA Women's World Cup ===
FIFA Women's World Cup record									Qualification record						
Year	Result	GP	W	D	L	GS	GA	GD	GP	W	D	L	GS	GA	GD
(China) 1991 to (United States) 2003	Did not exist								Did not exist						
(China) 2007	Did not qualify								Via AFC Women's Asian Cup						
(Germany) 2011	Did not qualify								Via AFC Women's Asian Cup						
(Canada) 2015	Did not enter								Did not enter						
(France) 2019	Did not enter								Did not enter						
(Australia) (New Zealand) 2023	Did not qualify								Via AFC Women's Asian Cup						
(Brazil) 2027	Did not qualify								Via AFC Women's Asian Cup						
(Costa Rica) (Jamaica) (Mexico) (United States) 2031	To be determined								To be determined						
(United Kingdom) 2035	To be determined								To be determined						
Total	0/10	–	–	–	–	–	–	–	–	–	–	–	–	–	–

=== Olympic Games ===
Summer Olympics record									Qualification record						
Year	Round	Pld	W	D*	L	GF	GA	GD	Pld	W	D*	L	GF	GA	GD
(United States) 1996 to (Greece) 2004	Did not exist								Did not exist						
(China) 2008	Did not qualify								3	0	0	3	0	20	−20
(United Kingdom) 2012	Did not enter								Did not enter						
(Brazil) 2016	Did not enter								Did not enter						
(Japan) 2020	Did not qualify								3	0	0	3	2	11	−9
(France) 2024	Withdrew from qualification								Withdrew						
(United States) 2028	Did not qualify								Via AFC Women's Asian Cup						
(Australia) 2032	To be determined								To be determined						
Total	0/9	–	–	–	–	–	–	–	3	0	0	3	2	31	−29

*Denotes draws includes knockout matches decided on penalty kicks.

=== AFC Women's Asian Cup ===
AFC Women's Asian Cup record									Qualification record						
Year	Result	GP	W	D*	L	GS	GA	GD	GP	W	D*	L	GS	GA	GD
(Hong Kong) 1975 to (Thailand) 2003	Did not exist								Did not exist						
(Australia) 2006	Did not qualify								2	0	0	2	0	10	−10
(Vietnam) 2008	Did not enter								Did not enter						
(China) 2010	Did not qualify								4	0	0	4	0	20	−20
(Vietnam) 2014	Did not enter								Did not enter						
(Jordan) 2018	Did not enter								Did not enter						
(India) 2022	Did not qualify								2	0	0	2	0	20	−20
(Australia) 2026	Did not qualify								3	0	0	3	0	15	−15
(Uzbekistan) 2029	To be determined								To be determined						
Total	0/21	–	–	–	–	–	–	–	11	0	0	11	0	65	−65

*Denotes draws includes knockout matches decided on penalty kicks.

=== Asian Games ===
Asian Games record
Year	Result	GP	W	D*	L	GF	GA	GD
(China) 1990 to (South Korea) 2002	Did not exist							
(Qatar) 2006	Did not participate							
(China) 2010	Did not participate							
(South Korea) 2014	Group stage	3	0	0	3	0	38	−38
(Indonesia) 2018	Group stage	3	0	0	3	0	21	−21
(China) 2022	Did not participate							
(Japan) 2026	To be determined							
Total	2/10	6	0	0	6	0	59	−59

*Denotes draws includes knockout matches decided on penalty kicks.

=== SAFF Women's Championship ===
SAFF Women's Championship record
Year	Result	GP	W	D*	L	GF	GA	GD
(Bangladesh) 2010	Group stage	3	0	1	2	3	10	−7
(Sri Lanka) 2012	Group stage	3	0	1	2	1	9	−8
(Pakistan) 2014	Group stage	3	1	0	2	2	11	−9
(India) 2016	Semi-finals	4	2	0	2	8	18	−10
(Nepal) 2019	Group stage	2	0	0	2	0	8	−8
(Nepal) 2022	Group stage	3	0	0	3	0	19	−19
(Nepal) 2024	Group stage	3	0	0	3	0	25	−25
(India) 2026	Group stage	2	0	0	2	2	15	−13
Total	8/8	23	3	2	18	16	116	−100

*Draws include knockout matches decided on penalty kicks.

=== South Asian Games ===
South Asian Games record
Year	Result	GP	W	D*	L	GF	GA	GD
(Bangladesh) 2010	Did not enter							
(India) 2016	Group stage	4	1	1	2	2	5	−3
(Nepal) 2019	Third place	3	1	0	2	2	9	−7
Total	2/3	7	2	1	4	4	14	−10

*Draws include knockout matches decided on penalty kicks.

=== AFF Women's Championship ===
AFF Women's Championship record
Year	Result	Pld	W	D*	L	GF	GA	GA
Invitee
(Vietnam) 2004	Group stage	3	0	0	3	0	43	−43
Total	1/12	3	0	0	3	0	43	−43

*Denotes draws includes knockout matches decided on penalty kicks.

== Honours ==
=== Regional ===
- **South Asian Games**

Bronze Medal: 2019

== See also ==
- Sport in Maldives
  - Football in Maldives
    - FAM Women's Football Championship
- Maldives women's national football team results
