= 2026 SAFF Women's Championship =

International football competition in India

Tournament details
- Host country: India
- Cities: Margao, Goa
- Dates: 25 May – 6 June 2026
- Teams: 6 (from 1 sub-confederation)
- Venue: Fatorda Stadium

Final positions
- Champions: India (6th title)
- Runners-up: Bangladesh

Tournament statistics
- Matches played: 9
- Goals scored: 35 (3.89 per match)
- Top scorer(s): (India) Aveka Singh (4 goals)
- Best player: (India) Sanfida Nongrum
- Best goalkeeper: (India) Panthoi Chanu Elangbam
- Fair play award: Nepal

The 2026 SAFF Women's Championship was the 8th edition of the SAFF Women's Championship, an international football competition for women's national teams from the South Asia region, organized by the South Asian Football Federation (SAFF). The tournament was played in India from 25 May to 6 June 2026 at Jawaharlal Nehru Stadium in Margao, Goa.

Bangladesh were the defending champions. On 6 June 2026, India beat Bangladesh by 3–1 in the final, winning the championship for the sixth time. India last won the title in the 2019 edition.

== Participating teams ==
The following six teams confirmed their participation in the tournament. Pakistan skipped this edition in India due to strenuous relations with the hosts.

Country	Appearance	Previous best performance	FIFA ranking (April 2026)
India (Host)	8th	Champions (2010, 2012, 2014, 2016, 2019)	69
Nepal	8th	Runners-up (2010, 2012, 2014, 2019, 2022, 2024)	87
Bangladesh	8th	Champions (2022, 2024)	112
Sri Lanka	8th	Semi-finals (2012, 2014, 2019)	162
Bhutan	8th	Semi-finals (2022, 2024)	164
Maldives	8th	Semi-finals (2016)	167

== Venue ==
All matches were played at Jawaharlal Nehru Stadium, Margao, Goa.

Margao	2026 SAFF Women's Championship (India)
Jawaharlal Nehru Stadium	2026 SAFF Women's Championship (India)
Capacity: 16,200	2026 SAFF Women's Championship (India)
Margao Stadium outside image	2026 SAFF Women's Championship (India)

== Draw ==
The draw ceremony of the tournament was held at the SAFF Secretariat in Dhaka, Bangladesh on 22 April 2026. The seeding for the draw was done in accordance with the latest FIFA Rankings issued on April 21. India and Nepal were placed in Pot 1; Bangladesh and Sri Lanka were placed in Pot 2; and Bhutan and Maldives were placed in Pot 3. Finally, Nepal, Sri Lanka and Bhutan were drawn in Group A, and the host was drawn along with Bangladesh and the Maldives in Group B.

=== Pots ===
Pot 1	Pot 2	Pot 3
India (H); Nepal	Bangladesh; Sri Lanka	Bhutan; Maldives

=== Result ===
Group A
Pos	Team
A1	Nepal
A2	Sri Lanka
A3	Bhutan

Group B
Pos	Team
B1	India
B2	Bangladesh
B3	Maldives

== Match officials ==
Referees

- (Bhutan) Choki Om
- (Bangladesh) Sharaban Tahura
- (India) Ranjita Devi Tekcham
- (India) Rachana Kamani
- (Nepal) Anjana Rai
- (Sri Lanka) Y. A. P. Minisarani Yapa

Assistant Referees & Fourth Officials

- (Bhutan) Tshering Choden
- (Nepal) Merina Dhimal
- (Bangladesh) Salma Akter Mone
- (India) Debala Devi Elangbam
- (India) Riiohlang Dhar
- (Sri Lanka) H. M. Malika Madhushani

Match Commissioners

- (Bangladesh) Subha Rahman
- (India) Wendy D'Costa

Referee Assessors

- (India) Maria Rebello

== Group stage ==
Tie-breaking criteria
The ranking of teams in each group is determined by the points obtained in all group matches. If two or more teams are equal on points, the following criteria are used to determine the ranking:
1. Points in head-to-head matches among tied teams;
2. Goal difference in head-to-head matches among tied teams;
3. Goals scored in head-to-head matches among tied teams;
4. If more than two teams remain tied after applying criteria 1–3, these criteria are reapplied exclusively to the subset of remaining tied teams;
5. Goal difference in all group matches;
6. Goals scored in all group matches;
7. Penalty shoot-out if only two teams are tied and they met in the last round of the group;
8. Disciplinary points in all group matches (yellow card = −1 point, indirect red card = −3 points, direct red card = −3 points, yellow followed by direct red card = −4 points), with the fewest minus points ranked highest;
9. Drawing of lots.

Key to colours in group tables
Group winners and runners-up advance to the Semi-finals

- All matches are being played in Goa, India.
- Times listed are UTC+5:30.

=== Group A ===
Pos	Team	Pld	W	D	L	GF	GA	GD	Pts	Qualification
1	Nepal	2	2	0	0	3	0	+3	6	Advance to knockout stage
2	Bhutan	2	1	0	1	4	1	+3	3	Advance to knockout stage
3	Sri Lanka	2	0	0	2	0	6	−6	0	

Source: SAFF
Rules for classification: 1) points; 2) head-to-head points; 3) head-to-head goal difference; 4) goal difference; 5) number of goals scored; 6) drawing of lots
25 May 2026
16:30

Bhutan	0–1	Nepal
	Report	Rana 23'

Jawaharlal Nehru Stadium, Margao
Referee: Ranjita Devi Tekcham (India)
Player of the match: Rekha Poudel (Nepal)

28 May 2026
16:30

Sri Lanka	0–4	Bhutan
	Report	Tshering 27', 80', 83'; Lhazom 54'

Jawaharlal Nehru Stadium, Margao
Attendance: 49
Referee: Anjana Rai (Nepal)
Player of the match: Pema Choden (Bhutan)

31 May 2026
16:30

Nepal	2–0	Sri Lanka
Ghishing 45+3'; Nagarkote 62'	Report

Jawaharlal Nehru Stadium, Margao
Attendance: 761
Referee: Ranjita Devi Tekcham (India)
Player of the match: Rashmi Ghising (Nepal)

=== Group B ===
Pos	Team	Pld	W	D	L	GF	GA	GD	Pts	Qualification
1	India (H)	2	2	0	0	14	0	+14	6	Advance to knockout stage
2	Bangladesh	2	1	0	1	4	5	−1	3	Advance to knockout stage
3	Maldives	2	0	0	2	2	15	−13	0	

Source: SAFF
Rules for classification: 1) points; 2) head-to-head points; 3) head-to-head goal difference; 4) goal difference; 5) number of goals scored; 6) drawing of lots
(H) Hosts
25 May 2026
19:30

Maldives	0–11	India
	Report	Naorem 11', 17'; Xaxa 28'; A. Singh 34', 66', 70', 86'; Dangmei 40'; Shirvoikar 53', 68'; Basfore 60'

Jawaharlal Nehru Stadium, Margao
Attendance: 225
Referee: Sharaban Tahura (Bangladesh)
Player of the match: Aveka Singh (India)

28 May 2026
19:30

Bangladesh	4–2	Maldives
Siddiqui 1'; Marma 34'; Prity 63'; Kisku 90+5'	Report	Noora 42'; Fazla 57'

Jawaharlal Nehru Stadium, Margao
Attendance: 127
Referee: Rachana Kamani (India)
Player of the match: Maria Manda (Bangladesh)

31 May 2026
19:30

India	3–0	Bangladesh
Xaxa 36'; Kom 78' (pen.); Prasad 90+1'	Report

Jawaharlal Nehru Stadium, Margao
Attendance: 553
Referee: Choki Om (Bhutan)
Player of the match: Sanfida Nongrum (India)

== Knockout stage ==
In the knockout stages, if a match finished goalless at the end of normal playing time, extra time would have been played (two periods of 15 minutes each) and followed, if necessary, by a penalty shoot-out to determine the winner.

=== Bracket ===
Semi-finals
3 June – Margao
Nepal	1
Bangladesh	2
3 June – Margao
India	1
Bhutan	0

Final
6 June – Margao
Bangladesh	1
India	3

=== Semi-finals ===
3 June 2026
16:00

Nepal	1–2	Bangladesh
Rana 22'	Report	R. Chakma 45+1'; Pr. Rai 90+3' (o.g.)

Jawaharlal Nehru Stadium, Margao
Attendance: 289
Referee: Choki Om (Bhutan)
Player of the match: Ritu Porna Chakma (Bangladesh)
3 June 2026
20:00

India	1–0	Bhutan
Nongrum 58'	Report

Jawaharlal Nehru Stadium, Margao
Attendance: 324
Referee: Y. A. P. Minisarani Yapa (Sri Lanka)
Player of the match: Sanfida Nongrum (India)

=== Final ===
6 June 2026
18:30

Bangladesh	1–3	India
R. Chakma 45+1'	Report	Xaxa 42'; Nongrum 46'; Kom 82'

Jawaharlal Nehru Stadium, Margao
Attendance: 729
Referee: Anjana Rai (Nepal)
Player of the match: Sanfida Nongrum (India)

== Winner ==
8th SAFF Women's Championship 2026

India
Sixth title

== Awards ==
Most Valuable Player	Top Scorer	Best Goalkeeper	Fair Play
(India) Sanfida Nongrum	(India) Aveka Singh (4 Goals)	(India) Panthoi Chanu Elangbam	Nepal

== Statistics ==
=== Goalscorers ===
There have been 35 goals scored in 9 matches, for an average of 3.89 goals per match.

4 goals

- (India) Aveka Singh

3 goals

- (Bhutan) Pema Choden Tshering
- (India) Pyari Xaxa

2 goals

- (Bangladesh) Ritu Porna Chakma
- (India) Karishma Shirvoikar
- (India) Lynda Kom
- (India) Priyangka Devi Naorem
- (India) Sanfida Nongrum
- (Nepal) Gita Rana

1 goal

- (Bangladesh) Anika Rania Siddiqui
- (Bangladesh) Kohati Kisku
- (Bangladesh) Sauravi Akanda Prity
- (Bangladesh) Umehla Marma
- (Bhutan) Deki Lhazom
- (India) Grace Dangmei
- (India) Malavika Prasad
- (India) Sangita Basfore
- (Maldives) Aminath Fazla
- (Maldives) Mariyam Noora
- (Nepal) Rashmi Ghishing
- (Nepal) Renuka Nagarkote

1 own goal

- (Nepal) Preeti Rai (against Bangladesh)

Source: Soccerway

=== Hat-tricks ===
- **Bold** indicates the winner.

No.	Player	For	Against	Goals	Result	Date	Ref.
1.	Aveka Singh	**India**	Maldives	4	11–0	25 May 2026	
2.	Pema Choden Tshering	**Bhutan**	Sri Lanka	3	4–0	28 May 2026	

== Broadcasting ==
Country / Region	Broadcasters	Ref.
Global	FanCode	
Bangladesh	T Sports	
Nepal	DGO Stream	

== See also ==
- 2026 SAFF Championship
- 2026 SAFF Club Championship
