= Jasoda Munda =

Indian football player

Personal information
- Date of birth: 3 April 2001 (age 25)
- Place of birth: Sambalpur, Odisha, India
- Height: 1.63 m (5 ft 4 in)
- Position: Midfielder

Team information
- Current team: Nita
- Number: 8

Youth career
- 2016–2018: Nita

Senior career*
Years	Team	Apps	(Gls)
2018–2019	Rising Students		
2021–2022	Odisha Police		
2022	Sports Odisha		
2022–2025	Odisha		
2025–	Nita		

International career^{‡}
2026–	India	8	(0)
- * Club domestic league appearances and goals as of 3 March 2026 ‡ National team caps and goals as of 11 October 2026

Jasoda Munda (born 3 April 2001) is an Indian professional footballer from Odisha, who plays as a midfielder for the Indian Women's League club Nita and the India women's national football team. She has also played for Odisha FCW, Rising Students, and Sports Odisha.

== Early life ==
Munda pursued her education at Deba Ray College in Nayapalli, Bhubaneswar while developing her football career. She currently works as an employee of the Odisha Police, having been appointed as a Police Constable by the Government of Odisha in June 2021.

== Career ==
Munda played for the Sambalpur Women's football team until 2014 and later made the switch to Nita Football Academy in Bhubaneswar in 2016. Jasoda has represented Odisha women's football team in the U-18, U-19 and Senior levels. Her participation in the Senior Nationals got her a job with Odisha Police, who she represented post the pandemic from 2021. Jasoda played her first Odisha Women's League in 2018 for Rising Students Club.

Munda's club career includes stints with Rising Student Club, Odisha Police and Sports Odisha, and she was signed by Odisha FC Women, highlighting her progression in the top tier of Indian women's football. Recently, she represented Nita Football Academy in the 2025–26 Indian Women's League season.

== Career statistics ==
=== International ===
As of 11 October 2026

National team	Year	Caps	Goals
India	2026	8	0
Total		8	0

== Honours ==
India

- SAFF Women's Championship: 2026

Odisha

- Indian Women's League: 2023–24
- Odisha Women's League: 2022–23

Odisha Police

- Odisha Women's League: 2021–22

Rising Students Club

- Odisha Women's League: 2020–21

Odisha (state)

- National Games: 2023, 2022 (runner-up)
- Khelo India Beach Games: 2025
- Junior Girl's National Football Championship: 2017–18 (runner-up)
