= 2026 SAFF Women's Championship squads =

Squads for football competition in India

The 2026 SAFF Women's Championship is the 8th edition of the SAFF Women's Championship, organized by the South Asian Football Federation (SAFF). The tournament is scheduled to be held in India from 25 May to 5 June 2026.

The following squads were announced by the respective national federations. Each team is permitted to register a maximum of 23 players for the tournament (except the hosts India, who named a 26-member preliminary squad).

Only players in these squads are eligible to take part in the tournament.

== Group A ==
=== Bhutan ===
Bhutan named their final squad on 25 May 2026.

Head coach: (South Korea) Kim Tae-in

Note: Flags indicate national team as defined under FIFA eligibility rules; some limited exceptions apply. Players may hold more than one non-FIFA nationality.

No.	Pos.	Nation	Player
1	GK	BHU	Sangita Monger
2	DF	BHU	Sonam Choden
3	DF	BHU	Kelzang T. Wangmo
4	DF	BHU	Ganga Ghalley
5	DF	BHU	Suk Maya Ghalley
6	DF	BHU	Pema Choden Tshering (Captain)
7	MF	BHU	Tshering Yangden
8	MF	BHU	Pema Kuenzang Choeki
9	FW	BHU	Deki Lhazom
10	FW	BHU	Sherab Pelmo
11	MF	BHU	Namgyel Dema
12	GK	BHU	Jamyang Choden

No.	Pos.	Nation	Player
13	MF	BHU	Preya Ghalley
14	MF	BHU	Tshering Lhaden
15	MF	BHU	Tashi Wangmo
16	DF	BHU	Dorji Edon
17	FW	BHU	Namsel Wangzom
18	FW	BHU	Tshering Yangchen
19	FW	BHU	Yeshey Bidha
20	FW	BHU	Puja Rai
21	FW	BHU	Pema Yangzom
22	GK	BHU	Kinzang Dema
23	FW	BHU	Ugyen Lhamo

=== Nepal ===
Nepal's squad was announced on 16 May 2026.

Head coach: (Nepal) Nabin Neupane

Note: Flags indicate national team as defined under FIFA eligibility rules; some limited exceptions apply. Players may hold more than one non-FIFA nationality.

No.	Pos.	Nation	Player
1	GK	NEP	Usha Nath
2	DF	NEP	Puja Rana
3	DF	NEP	Bimala BK
4	DF	NEP	Samikshaya Ghimire
5	DF	NEP	Sabina Chaudhary
6	DF	NEP	Hira Kumari Bhujel
7	MF	NEP	Renuka Nagarkoti
8	MF	NEP	Saru Limbu
9	FW	NEP	Anita KC
10	FW	NEP	Purnima Rai
11	FW	NEP	Anita Basnet
12	DF	NEP	Gita Rana

No.	Pos.	Nation	Player
13	FW	NEP	Rekha Poudel
14	MF	NEP	Preeti Rai
15	FW	NEP	Meena Deuba
16	GK	NEP	Anjila Tumbapo Subba (Captain)
17	DF	NEP	Pratishya Chaudhary
18	MF	NEP	Birshana Chaudhary
19	FW	NEP	Rashmi Ghishing
20	GK	NEP	Anjana Rana Magar
21	DF	NEP	Nisha Thokar
22	FW	NEP	Anita Lamjel
23	MF	NEP	Dipa Shahi

=== Sri Lanka ===
Sri Lanka's squad was announced on 25 May 2026.

Head coach: (Qatar) Ahmed Al-Mannai

Note: Flags indicate national team as defined under FIFA eligibility rules; some limited exceptions apply. Players may hold more than one non-FIFA nationality.

No.	Pos.	Nation	Player
1	GK	SRI	Ashani Anuradhini
2	FW	SRI	Y. Umasankavi
3	FW	SRI	Hashini Rathnayaka
4	FW	SRI	Rashmi Devindi
5	DF	SRI	S. Viththiyalani
6	DF	SRI	Madumali Somarathna
7	FW	SRI	Sanduni Sewmini
8	DF	SRI	Achala S. Perera
9	MF	SRI	P. Shanu
10	DF	SRI	Gagani Gayathma
11	DF	SRI	J. Layansika
12	MF	SRI	Thushani Madhushika
13	FW	SRI	Parami Rajapaksha

No.	Pos.	Nation	Player
14	DF	SRI	Sasidi Nimsara
15	MF	SRI	Aathika Asfar
16	FW	SRI	Tharidi Weliwita
17	GK	SRI	Imesha Warnakulasuriya (Captain)
18	MF	SRI	S. Tharmika
19	DF	SRI	S. Yuwarani
20	MF	SRI	Lochani Sooriyaarachchi
21	MF	SRI	Navanjana Perera
22	GK	SRI	Tharushika Dilshani
23	GK	SRI	Harshani Rupasinha

== Group B ==
=== Bangladesh ===
The defending champions Bangladesh announced their final 23-member squad on 27 May 2026. Maria Manda was appointed as the captain of Bangladesh in this competition.

Head coach: (England) Peter Butler

Note: Flags indicate national team as defined under FIFA eligibility rules; some limited exceptions apply. Players may hold more than one non-FIFA nationality.

No.	Pos.	Nation	Player
1	GK	BAN	Rupna Chakma
2	DF	BAN	Sheuli Azim
3	DF	BAN	Shamsunnahar Sr.
4	DF	BAN	Afeida Khandaker
5	DF	BAN	Kohati Kisku
6	MF	BAN	Mst Momita Khatun
7	MF	BAN	Monika Chakma
8	MF	BAN	Maria Manda (Captain)
9	MF	BAN	Anika Rania Siddiqui
10	FW	BAN	Tohura Khatun
11	FW	BAN	Umehla Marma
12	FW	BAN	Saurvi Akanda Pritty

No.	Pos.	Nation	Player
13	DF	BAN	Mst Surovi Akter Arfin
14	MF	BAN	Mst Halima Akther
15	DF	BAN	Arpita Biswas Arpita
16	DF	BAN	Unnati Khatun
17	FW	BAN	Ritu Porna Chakma
18	FW	BAN	Shaheda Akter Ripa
19	FW	BAN	Mst Sagorika
20	FW	BAN	Shamsunnahar Jr.
21	DF	BAN	Mst Surma Jannat
22	GK	BAN	Swarna Rani Mandal
23	GK	BAN	Mile Akter

=== India ===
The hosts India named their final squad on 23 May 2026.

Head coach: (India) Crispin Chettri

Note: Flags indicate national team as defined under FIFA eligibility rules; some limited exceptions apply. Players may hold more than one non-FIFA nationality.

No.	Pos.	Nation	Player
1	GK	IND	Panthoi Chanu Elangbam (Captain)
2	DF	IND	Purnima Kumari
3	DF	IND	Nirmala Devi Phanjoubam
4	DF	IND	Shilky Devi Hemam
5	DF	IND	Juli Kishan
6	MF	IND	Sangita Basfore
7	FW	IND	Soumya Guguloth
8	MF	IND	Sanfida Nongrum
9	DF	IND	Astam Oraon
10	FW	IND	Pyari Xaxa
12	FW	IND	Lynda Kom Serto

No.	Pos.	Nation	Player
13	GK	IND	Shreya Hooda
14	DF	IND	Ranjana Chanu Sorokhaibam
15	MF	IND	Priyangka Devi Naorem
17	FW	IND	Karishma Shirvoikar
18	MF	IND	Jasoda Munda
19	FW	IND	Aveka Singh
20	MF	IND	Thoibisana Chanu Toijam
21	DF	IND	Sarita Yumnam
22	FW	IND	Malavika Prasad
23	GK	IND	Ribansi Jamu

=== Maldives ===
Maldives named their final squad on 25 May 2026.

Head coach: (Maldives) Sabah Mohamed Ibrahim

Note: Flags indicate national team as defined under FIFA eligibility rules; some limited exceptions apply. Players may hold more than one non-FIFA nationality.

No.	Pos.	Nation	Player
1	GK	MDV	Fathimath Sausan
2	DF	MDV	Fathimath Faiha Ali
3	DF	MDV	Aishath Raveena
4	DF	MDV	Shahfa Shiuth
5	DF	MDV	Shiyana Ahmed Zuhair
6	DF	MDV	Fathimath Afza
7	FW	MDV	Fathimath Inaasha Adam
8	MF	MDV	Mariyam Shafa Binath Ahmed Ali
9	FW	MDV	Safiyya Rafa
10	FW	MDV	Mariyam Noora
11	MF	MDV	Aishath Siuna
12	GK	MDV	Shahula Thaufeeq

No.	Pos.	Nation	Player
13	FW	MDV	Fathimath Saliya
14	MF	MDV	Hawwa Haneefa
15	MF	MDV	Aishath Laiba Zahir
16	DF	MDV	Aminath Shudha
17	FW	MDV	Mariyam Rifa
18	FW	MDV	Saiga Hussain
19	MF	MDV	Raniya Ibrahim
20	MF	MDV	Maeesha Aminath Hannan (Captain)
21	MF	MDV	Aminath Fazla
22	GK	MDV	Rishma Abdullah
23	MF	MDV	Farah Ahmed
