= KIIT =

KIIT may refer to:

- Kalinga Institute of Industrial Technology, also known as KIIT University, Bhubaneswar, Odisha, India
  - KIIT School of Management, business school within the institute
  - KIIT Group of Institutions, private organisation running the institute
  - KIIT incident 2025, suicide of Prakriti Lamsal, a Nepalese student in India
- KIIT-CD, a low-power television station (channel 11) licensed to North Platte, Nebraska, United States
