= Juli Kishan =

Indian football player

Personal information
- Date of birth: 8 May 1999 (age 27)
- Place of birth: Rourkela, Orissa, India
- Height: 1.59 m (5 ft 3 in)
- Position: Defender

Team information
- Current team: Nita
- Number: 16

Youth career
- Young AC Kuarmunda

Senior career*
Years	Team	Apps	(Gls)
2018–2019	Rising Students	5	(0)
- East Coast Railway
- Odisha Police
2021–2022	Sports Odisha	8	(0)
2022–2024	Odisha	18	(1)
2024–	Nita	11	(1)

International career^{‡}
2022–	India	17	(0)
- * Club domestic league appearances and goals ‡ National team caps and goals as of 11 October 2026

Juli Kishan (born 8 May 1999) is an Indian professional footballer from Odisha, who plays as a defender for the Indian Women's League club Nita and the India women's national football team. She has also played for Odisha Police and East Coast Railways.

== Early life ==
Juli was born in Rourkela to Yogeshwar Kishan. She started playing football in 2016 with Young Association Club in Kuarmunda village. Former player and coach Gitanjali Khuntia spotted her at the U-19 Odisha State camp. She was appointed as a constable by Odisha State Police in June 2021.

== Career ==
- 2016: She started playing football and was selected for the Odisha team in July to play in the Junior under-19 women's National Football Tournament at Cuttack.
- 10 September 2022: Senior India debut against Maldives at SAFF games.
- September 2022: SAFF Women's Football Championship, Dasharath Stadium, Kathmandu, Nepal.
- February 2023: Two friendly matches against Nepal, Jawaharlal Nehru Stadium, Chennai.
- March 2023: Friendly matches against Jordan in Amman, and against Uzbekistan in Tashkent.
- 2023: She is among the 34 probables for the National camp of the Senior India team preparing for AFC Olympic Qualifiers Round 2 at Bhubaneswar from July 30.

== Career statistics ==
=== International ===
As of 11 October 2026

National team	Year	Caps	Goals
India	2022	2	0
India	2023	3	0
India	2024	4	0
India	2025	0	0
India	2026	8	0
Total		17	0

== Honours ==
India

- SAFF Women's Championship: 2026

Odisha

- Indian Women's League: 2023–24

Odisha Police

- Odisha Women's League: 2021–22

Odisha (state)

- National Games Silver medal: 2022
