= 2022–23 Odisha Women's League =

Odisha Women's League
- Season: 2022–23
- Dates: 27 November - 21 December
- Champions: Odisha FC Women (1st title)
- Indian Women's League: Odisha FC Women
- Matches played: 16
- Goals scored: 67 (4.19 per match)
- Top goalscorer: Yumnam Kamala Devi (East Coast Railway) (22 goals)
- All statistics correct as of 11 December 2022.

The 2022–23 Odisha Women's League was the 10th edition of the Odisha Women's League, the top Odia professional football league, since its establishment in 2011. Odisha Police are the defending champions. The league is organised by the Football Association of Odisha (FAO), the official football governing body of Odisha, in association with the Department of Sports and Youth Services (DSYS) of the Government of Odisha.

On 26 November 2022, the jersey launch ceremony of the six participating teams for the 2022–23 season was held in the presence of Minister of Sports for Government of Odisha, Tusharkanti Behera, and the Secretary of the Football Association of Odisha (FAO), Asirbad Behera, at the Kalinga Stadium. Football Association of Odisha (FAO) treasurer Bhakta Ballav Das, vice-president Dilip Kumar Sahoo, and joint-secretaries Avijit Paul and Sangeeta Sharma, and Department of Sports and Youth Services Officer-on-Special-Duty (OSD), Shuvendu Panda, were also present on the occasion alongside captains, coaches, and managers of all participating teams.

== Teams ==
Venues in Odisha

=== Personnel ===
| Team | Head coach | Captain |
|---|---|---|
| East Coast Railway | | (India) Supriya Routray |
| Odisha FC Women | (India) Crispin Chettri | (India) Karishma Oram |
| Odisha Government Press | | (India) Pipili Mohanty |
| Odisha Police | (India) Sakina Nesa | (India) Jabamani Soren |
| Sports Odisha | (India) Sarita Jayanti Behera | (India) Manisha Naik |
| Rising Students Club | (India) Sheikh Manzoor | (India) Ashrita Kangadi |

=== Squads ===
| East Coast Railway | Odisha FC Women | Odisha Government Press | Odisha Police | Sports Odisha | Rising Students Club |
|---|---|---|---|---|---|
| Supriya Routray (C); Manisa Panna; Chandani Patel; Jabamani Tudu; Sonali Behera; Janjali Sahu; Yumnam Kamala Devi; Laharee Mangaraj; Tara Khatoon; Pinky Purty; Madhusmita Barik; Mamata Patra; Sumitra Munda; Deogi Murmu; Pratima Minz; Swarnamayee Samal; Bishnupriya Mahanta | Karishma Oram (C); Sasmita Parida; Arifa Zaheer; Juli Kishan; Jasoda Munda; Pyari Xaxa; Grace Lalrampari Hauhnar; Karthika Angamuthu; Bannya Kabiraj; Susmita Tanty; Sumitra Xalxo; Shreya Hooda; Munica Minz; Satyabati Khadia; Malati Munda; Deepa Nayak; Kamini Munda; Sradhanjali Panda; Janaki Murmu; Saloni Rathod | Pipili Mohanty (C); Sila Singh; Sonali Sabar; Sunita Swain; Suprava Barik; Nirmala Behera; Animi Kritika Kumari; Laxmipriya Bhoi; Monalisa Naik; Priyadarshini Behera; Reshma Singh | Jabamani Soren (C); Sanjukta Tirkey; Sasmita Ekka; Sinulata Sahoo; Soni Behera; Arati Anima Khadia; Eva Panna; Jasmani Samad; Jharana Malik; Laxmi Munda; Parbati Kujur; Runi Nayak; Gomati Bara; Kabita Kar; Pravasini Parida; Rajeswari Das; Susmita Dalei; Tikina Samal; Swarnapriya Nayak; Suman Pragyan Mohapatra | Manisha Naik (C); Manju Ganjhu; Suhasini Mahakul; Sangeeta Das; Maxima Kujur; Shibani Mundari; Sumitra Hembram; Salege Majhi; Pratima Oram; Subhasmita Subhadarsini Das; Subhasini Saha; Baisakhi Nayak; Sarita Soreng; Sanghamitra Malik; Sasmita Amanga; Pranati Pati; Pratima Nayak; Pari Pradhan; Basanti Xess; Spandita Das | Ashrita Kangadi (C); Subhasini Oram; Subhadra Sahoo; Subhashree Swain; Barsha Mahakud; Bharati Das; Gayatri Behera; Janhabi Kishan; Joshna Lakra; Laxmipriya Lenka; Nikita Bishi; Premsila Lugun; Ranee Bag; Ambruta Nayak; Jyosna Kishan; Pramila Kishan |

== Standings ==
| Pos | Team | Pld | W | D | L | GF | GA | GD | Pts | Qualification |
|---|---|---|---|---|---|---|---|---|---|---|
| 1 | Odisha FC Women | 10 | 10 | 0 | 0 | 46 | 3 | +43 | 30 | Qualification for the 2022–23 Indian Women's League |
| 2 | East Coast Railway | 10 | 8 | 0 | 2 | 46 | 4 | +42 | 24 | |
| 3 | Sports Odisha | 10 | 5 | 0 | 5 | 19 | 25 | −6 | 15 | |
| 4 | Rising Students Club | 10 | 4 | 0 | 6 | 12 | 34 | −22 | 12 | |
| 5 | Odisha Police | 10 | 3 | 0 | 7 | 20 | 21 | −1 | 9 | |
| 6 | Odisha Government Press | 10 | 0 | 0 | 10 | 0 | 55 | −55 | 0 | |

Source: Orisports
Rules for classification: 1) points; 2) head-to-head points; 3) head-to-head goal difference; 4) goal difference; 5) number of goals scored; 6) drawing of lots

== Statistics ==
=== Scoring ===
As of 21 December 2022

| Rank | Player | Club | Goals |
|---|---|---|---|
| 1 | Yumnam Kamala Devi | East Coast Railway | 22 |
| 2 | Pyari Xaxa | Odisha FC Women | 11 |
| 3 | Karthika Angamuthu | Odisha FC Women | 9 |
| 3 | Deepa Nayak | Odisha FC Women | 9 |
| 4 | Supriya Routray | East Coast Railway | 8 |
| 5 | Manisha Naik | Sports Odisha | 7 |
| 6 | Jasoda Munda | Odisha FC Women | 6 |
| 6 | Jasmani Samad | Odisha Police | 6 |
| 7 | Jabamani Soren | Odisha Police | 5 |
| 7 | Pratima Nayak | Sports Odisha | 5 |
| 8 | Ambruta Nayak | Rising Students Club | 4 |
| 8 | Tara Khatoon | East Coast Railway | 4 |
| 9 | Eva Panna | Odisha Police | 3 |
| 9 | Laharee Mangaraj | East Coast Railway | 3 |
| 9 | Malati Munda | Odisha FC Women | 3 |
| 9 | Nikita Bishi | Rising Students Club | 3 |
| 10 | Gayatri Behera | Rising Students Club | 2 |
| 10 | Munica Minz | Odisha FC Women | 2 |
| 10 | Pinky Purty | East Coast Railway | 2 |
| 10 | Saloni Rathod | Odisha FC Women | 2 |
| 10 | Soni Behera | Odisha Police | 2 |
| 10 | Subhasini Saha | Sports Odisha | 2 |
| 11 | Arati Anima Khadia | Odisha Police | 1 |
| 11 | Arifa Zaheer | Odisha FC Women | 1 |
| 11 | Bannya Kabiraj | Odisha FC Women | 1 |
| 11 | Jabamani Tudu | East Coast Railway | 1 |
| 11 | Karishma Oram | Odisha FC Women | 1 |
| 11 | Manisa Panna | East Coast Railway | 1 |
| 11 | Parbati Kujur | Odisha Police | 1 |
| 11 | Pranati Pati | Sports Odisha | 1 |
| 11 | Premsila Lugun | Rising Students Club | 1 |
| 11 | Sasmita Amanga | Sports Odisha | 1 |
| 11 | Satyabati Khadia | Odisha FC Women | 1 |
| 11 | Subhadra Sahoo | Rising Students Club | 1 |
| 11 | Subhasmita Das | Sports Odisha | 1 |
| 11 | Suhasini Mahakul | Sports Odisha | 1 |
| 11 | Suman Pragyan Mohapatra | Odisha Police | 1 |
| 11 | Susmita Dalei | Odisha Police | 1 |
