= Pyari Xaxa =

Indian footballer

Personal information
- Date of birth: 18 May 1997 (age 29)
- Place of birth: Jhartarang, Sundergarh district, Orissa, India
- Height: 1.56 m (5 ft 1 in)
- Position: Forward

Team information
- Current team: Nita
- Number: 10

Youth career
- Kunwarmunda

Senior career*
| Years | Team | Apps | (Gls) |
| 2016–2018 | Rising Students | 11 | (14) |
| 2022 | Sports Odisha | 10 | (12) |
| 2022–2025 | Odisha | 30 | (31) |
| 2025– | Nita | 7 | (10) |

International career^{‡}
| 2014 | India U19 | 3 | (2) |
| 2015– | India | 47 | (22) |
- * Club domestic league appearances and goals ‡ National team caps and goals as of 6 June 2026

Pyari Xaxa (born 18 May 1997) is an Indian professional footballer who plays as a forward for the Indian Women's League club Nita and the India national team.

Pyari is widely regarded as one of India's most dynamic and prolific attackers, known for her speed, sharp positioning, and clinical finishing. Her pace and attacking threat have often been cited as major assets for the national team, with some calling her the Ferrari of the Indian women's side due to her speed.

Pyari is a two-time Indian Women's League champion and a National Games gold medalist, underlining her consistency and success at both club and state levels. Over the years, she has been recognised for her outstanding performances with several individual honours, including the AIFF Women's Promising Player of the Year (2015), the Indian Football Fans’ Player of the Year (2020–21), and the FPAI Indian Women's Player of the Year (2025).

== Early life ==
Pyari hails from Jhartarang in the Sundergarh district of Odisha. Her first formal club involvement was with a local club called Kunwarmunda (also spelled "Kumarmunda" or "Kuarmunda") in Odisha, where she played in her formative years. This early environment, playing often alongside boys in her village, gave her game-time, development and exposure.

== Club career ==
=== Rising Students Club ===
In 2016, Pyari was signed by Rising Students Club, an Odisha-based club, to play in the inaugural edition of the Indian Women's League.

In the 2016–17 Indian Women's League season, Pyari made a major impact, where she scored a total of 14 goals (10 in the preliminary round and 4 in the final round), helping her team reach the final, though they lost to Eastern Sporting Union. This performance underlined her goal-scoring ability and marked her as one of the emerging forwards in Indian women's football.

After an impressive inaugural IWL campaign where Pyari scored 14 goals and helped her side reach the final, she continued her fine form into the 2017–18 Indian Women's League, scoring 3 goals. Her contributions were vital as Rising Students Club went on to win the league title, defeating Eastern Sporting Union in the final.

=== Sports Odisha ===
Ahead of the 2021–22 Indian Women's League, Pyari represented and captained Odisha Police, leading the team to the 2021–22 Odisha Women's League title. Her four crucial goals played a key role in their championship-winning campaign, which also secured qualification for the 2021–22 Indian Women's League. Pyari joined the Sports Odisha for the 2021–22 IWL season. During the season, Pyari recorded 12 goals in 10 appearances, once again proving to be one of the most consistent forwards in the Indian women's circuit.

=== Odisha FC Women ===
In mid-2022, Pyari Xaxa became the first-ever signing for Odisha FC Women, the women's team of the Indian Super League club Odisha FC. Since joining, she has established herself as one of the side's most influential players, leading the attack with consistency and an exceptional scoring record.

During the 2022–23 Odisha Women's League, clubs first ever participation in a league, Pyari was in outstanding form, scoring 11 goals and guiding Odisha FC Women to their maiden regional title. Despite missing the 2022–23 Indian Women's League season due to a knee injury that required surgery in January 2023, she remained a key figure off the field. Her recovery was further challenged by a setback while attempting an early return to action.

Fully fit again, Pyari returned for the 2023–24 Indian Women's League season, where she rediscovered her scoring touch, netting 8 goals to finish as Odisha FC Women's top scorer and joint second-highest overall in the league. Her efforts played a pivotal role in helping the club secure its first-ever Indian Women's League championship. After an outstanding 2023–24 season, Pyari won the 2025 FPAI Indian Player of the Year award and was also nominated for the 2024 Women's Footballer of the Year award by Times of India Sports Awards.

With 31 goals in 30 appearances, Pyari Xaxa currently stands as the all-time leading goalscorer for Odisha FCW.

== International career ==
Xaxa made her senior international debut in 2014, featuring for the India U19 side during the 2015 AFC U-19 Women's Championship qualification campaign.

Pyari made her senior India debut in 2015, at the age of 18, and has since become a regular member of the national team setup. She was a part of the team that won gold medal at the 2016 South Asian Games in Shillong. In recognition of her promise and performances, Pyari was awarded the 2015 AIFF Women's Promising Player of the Year.

Despite her talent, Pyari's international journey has not been entirely smooth. She missed selection for a 30-member India squad ahead of the 2024 AFC Women's Olympic Qualifying Tournament due to injury.

Her prolific performance in June 2025, helped India qualify for the 2026 AFC Women's Asian Cup. In recognition of her performances for both club and country, Pyari was adjudged the FPAI Indian Women's Player of the Year.

== Career statistics ==
=== International ===
As of 6 June 2026

| National team | Year | Caps | Goals |
|---|---|---|---|
| India | 2015 | 1 | 0 |
| India | 2016 | 2 | 0 |
| India | 2017 | 1 | 2 |
| India | 2018 | 3 | 0 |
| India | 2019 | 2 | 1 |
| India | 2021 | 11 | 4 |
| India | 2022 | 2 | 0 |
| India | 2023 | 1 | 0 |
| India | 2024 | 8 | 6 |
| India | 2025 | 8 | 5 |
| India | 2026 | 8 | 3 |
| Total | | 47 | 21 |

Scores and results list India's goal tally first.

List of international goals scored by Pyari Xaxa
| No. | Date | Venue | Opponent | Score | Result | Competition |
|---|---|---|---|---|---|---|
| 1. | 31 July 2017 | MP Selayang Stadium, Kuala Lumpur, Malaysia | Malaysia | 1–0 | 2–0 | Friendly |
| 2. | 31 July 2017 | MP Selayang Stadium, Kuala Lumpur, Malaysia | Malaysia | 2–0 | 2–0 | Friendly |
| 3. | 23 January 2019 | Hong Kong | Hong Kong | 1–0 | 1–0 | Friendly |
| 4. | 23 February 2021 | Gold City Sports Complex, Kargıcak, Turkey | Ukraine | 1–0 | 2–3 | 2021 Turkish Women's Cup |
| 5. | 2 October 2021 | Theyab Awana Stadium, Dubai, United Arab Emirates | United Arab Emirates | 2–0 | 4–1 | Friendly |
| 6. | 10 October 2021 | Hamad Town Stadium, Hamad Town, Bahrain | Bahrain | 2–0 | 5–0 | Friendly |
| 7. | 10 October 2021 | Hamad Town Stadium, Hamad Town, Bahrain | Bahrain | 4–0 | 5–0 | Friendly |
| 8. | 21 February 2024 | Gold City Sports Complex, Alanya, Turkey | Estonia | 3–1 | 4–3 | 2024 Turkish Women's Cup |
| 9. | 9 July 2024 | Thuwunna Stadium, Yangon, Myanmar | Myanmar | 1–1 | 1–2 | Friendly |
| 10. | 12 July 2024 | Thuwunna Stadium, Yangon, Myanmar | Myanmar | 1–0 | 1–1 | Friendly |
| 11. | 30 December 2024 | Padukone – Dravid Centre for Sports Excellence, Bengaluru, India | Maldives | 1–0 | 14–0 | Friendly |
| 12. | 30 December 2024 | Padukone – Dravid Centre for Sports Excellence, Bengaluru, India | Maldives | 2–0 | 14–0 | Friendly |
| 13. | 30 December 2024 | Padukone – Dravid Centre for Sports Excellence, Bengaluru, India | Maldives | 4–0 | 14–0 | Friendly |
| 14. | 23 June 2025 | 700th Anniversary Stadium, Chiang Mai, Thailand | Mongolia | 3–0 | 13–0 | 2026 AFC Women's Asian Cup qualification |
| 15. | 23 June 2025 | 700th Anniversary Stadium, Chiang Mai, Thailand | Mongolia | 4–0 | 13–0 | 2026 AFC Women's Asian Cup qualification |
| 16. | 23 June 2025 | 700th Anniversary Stadium, Chiang Mai, Thailand | Mongolia | 5–0 | 13–0 | 2026 AFC Women's Asian Cup qualification |
| 17. | 23 June 2025 | 700th Anniversary Stadium, Chiang Mai, Thailand | Mongolia | 6–0 | 13–0 | 2026 AFC Women's Asian Cup qualification |
| 18. | 23 June 2025 | 700th Anniversary Stadium, Chiang Mai, Thailand | Mongolia | 8–0 | 13–0 | 2026 AFC Women's Asian Cup qualification |
| 19. | 25 May 2026 | Jawaharlal Nehru Stadium, Margao, India | Maldives | 3–0 | 11–0 | 2026 SAFF Women's Championship |
| 20. | 31 May 2026 | Jawaharlal Nehru Stadium, Margao, India | Bangladesh | 1–0 | 3–0 | 2026 SAFF Women's Championship |
| 21. | 6 June 2026 | Jawaharlal Nehru Stadium, Margao, India | Bangladesh | 1–0 | 3–1 | 2026 SAFF Women's Championship |

== Honours ==
India

- SAFF Women's Championship: 2026
- South Asian Games: 2016

Odisha

- Indian Women's League: 2023–24
- Odisha Women's League: 2022–23

Rising Students

- Indian Women's League: 2017–18, 2016–17 (runner-up)
- Odisha Women's League: 2017

Odisha Police

- Odisha Women's League: 2021–22

Odisha (State)

- Rajmata Jijabai Trophy: 2024–25 (runner-up)
- Junior Girls' National Football Championship: 2013–14 (runner-up)
- National Games: 2023, 2022 (runner-up), 2025 (runner-up)

Individual

- AIFF Women's Promising Player of the Year: 2014–15
- FPAI Indian Player of the Year: 2024–25
- Indian Football Fans' Player of the Year: 2020–21
- Ekalabya Puraskar (Odisha): 2021, 2022
- GrandQueens Leadership Award for Women in Sports: 2023
