= 2024–25 Odisha Women's League =

Odisha Women's League
- Season: 2024–25
- Dates: 8 January 2025 - 18 March 2025
- Champions: Nita (2nd title)
- Matches: 10
- Goals: 44 (4.4 per match)

The 2024–25 Odisha Women's League was the 12th edition of the Odisha Women's League, the top Odia professional football league, since its establishment in 2011. Nita Football Academy are the defending champions. The league is organised by the Football Association of Odisha (FAO), the official football governing body of Odisha, in association with the Department of Sports and Youth Services (DSYS) of the Government of Odisha.

== Teams ==
No.	Team	Location
1	Nita Football Academy	Cuttack
2	Odisha Government Press	Cuttack
3	Odisha Police	Cuttack
4	Rising Students Club	Cuttack
5	KIIT & KISS	Bhubaneswar
6	Sports Odisha	Bhubaneswar
7	Tarini Football Academy	Keonjhar
8	Tata Steel Foundation	Joda
9	Young Association Kuarmunda	Sundergarh
10	Buxi Jagabandhu Club	Bargarh
11	Manorama Club	Deogarh

== Venues ==
- Kalinga Stadium
- Unit 1 Football Ground

== League stage ==
Pos	Team	Pld	W	D	L	GF	GA	GD	Pts	Qualification
1	Nita Football Academy (Note: If the top teams are already playing in national leagues, then the next highest ranked team would be eligible for Indian Women's League 2.)	10	8	2	0	50	2	+48	26	Champions
2	Sports Odisha	10	8	2	0	0	0	0	26	Qualification for 2025–26 Indian Women's League 2
3	Odisha Police	10	8	1	1	0	0	0	25	
4	KIIT & KISS	10	6	0	4	0	0	0	18	
5	Young Association Kuarmunda	10	5	1	4	0	0	0	16	
6	Tarini Football Academy	10	5	1	4	0	0	0	16	
7	Odisha Government Press	10	4	1	5	0	0	0	13	
8	Tata Steel Foundation	10	3	1	6	0	0	0	10	
9	Rising Students Club	10	1	2	7	0	0	0	5	
10	Manorama Club	10	1	1	8	0	0	0	4	
11	Buxi Jagabandhu Club	10	0	0	10	0	0	0	0	

Source: The Away End
Rules for classification: 1) points; 2) head-to-head points; 3) head-to-head goal difference; 4) goal difference; 5) number of goals scored; 6) drawing of lots
