= Crispin Chettri =

Indian football manager

Personal information
- Full name: Crispin Chettri
- Date of birth: 20 January 1975 (age 51)
- Place of birth: Kurseong, West Bengal, India

Team information
- Current team: India Women (head coach)

Youth career
- Williamson Magor FA

Senior career*
Years	Team	Apps	(Gls)
–	Mohun Bagan		
- Tollygunge Agragami
- United

International career
1999–2000	India U19		

Managerial career
- 2020–2021: Mohammedan (assistant)
- 2021–2024: Odisha (state)
- 2021–2022: Sethu
- 2022–2025: Odisha
- 2025–2026: India Women
- 2026: India Women (assistant)
- 2026–: India Women
- * Club domestic league appearances and goals

Crispin Chettri (born 20 January 1975) is an Indian football manager and former footballer, who is currently serving as the head coach of the India women's national football team. He also served as the head coach of the Indian women's club Odisha. He has also represented India at the youth level internationally.

== Early life ==
Chettri hails from Kurseong, located in the Darjeeling district, West Bengal.

== Playing career ==
Chettri has represented the clubs Mohun Bagan, Tollygunge Agragami and United SC in the domestic leagues. He represented Assam at the state level in Santosh Trophy and also later represented Bengal, Maharashtra and Sikkim.

== International career ==
Chettri was selected for the Indian youth team that toured Mauritius in 1999. He represented the Indian U19 team at the 2000 AFC Youth Championship qualifiers held at Sri Lanka in 2000.

== Coaching career ==
Chettri had his first coaching job as the assistant manager of the Kolkata club Mohammedan SC which was playing in the I-League.

=== Sethu FC ===
Chettri was named the head coach of the Sethu FC for the 2021–22 Indian Women's League season. They finished as runners-up for the season behind Gokulam Kerala.

=== Odisha FC ===
Chettri was named the head coach of the Odisha FC Women for the 2022–23 Indian Women's League season. Under his coaching, Odisha FC won their first domestic trophy Odisha Women's League in the 2022–23 season. They qualified for the 2022–23 Indian Women's League, where they finished as quarter-finalists in their debut appearance at the first tier.

Chettri led Odisha to their maiden Indian Women's League title in the 2023–24 season.

Odisha FC Women represented India in the 2024–25 AFC Women's Champions League after winning the national league. In the preliminary stage, they won against Etihad (UAE) and Lion City Sailors (Singapore). Odisha advanced to the group stage and were drawn into Group C with Urawa Red Diamonds (Japan), Ho Chi Minh City FC (Vietnam), and Taichung Blue Whale (Chinese Taipei). They were eliminated in the group stage after a series of defeats, including a 17–0 loss to Urawa Red Diamonds.

Odisha FC Women, the defending champions of the Indian Women's League (IWL), were relegated to IWL 2 in the 2024–25 season following a disappointing campaign. Despite winning the IWL title in 2023–24 under head coach Crispin Chettri, the team endured a poor run, finishing with only 12 points from 11 matches. Their relegation was confirmed after a 3–0 loss to Sreebhumi FC on April 16, 2025, marking a dramatic fall from grace for the club.

=== India ===
In February 2025, Chettri took over as the head coach of the India women's football team and led them during the Pink Ladies Cup. In July 2025, Chettri led India to a historic qualification for the AFC Women's Asian Cup as the team secured a berth at for the first time via qualification. India defeated group qualifiers host Thailand 2–1 to earn a berth at the 2026 edition set to be hosted in Australia.

== Managerial statistics ==
As of 6 June 2026

All competitive games (league, domestic and continental cups) are included.

Managerial record by team and tenure
Team	From	To	Record				
Team	From	To	P	W	D	L	Win %
Sethu	2021	2022	11	10	0	1	90.9
Odisha	2022	2025	43	27	5	11	62.8
India	2025	present	17	10	0	7	58.8
Total			71	47	5	19	66.2

== Honours ==
=== Player ===
Eveready Association

- Kalinga Cup: 2005

=== Manager ===
Sethu FC

- Indian Women's League runner-up: 2021–22

Odisha FC

- Indian Women's League: 2023–24
- Odisha Women's League: 2022–23

Odisha

- National Games Gold medal: 2023; Silver medal: 2022
