= 2023–24 Odisha Women's League =

Odisha Women's League
- Season: 2023–24
- Dates: 6 December 2023 - 6 January 2024
- Champions: Nita (1st title)
- Matches played: 30
- Goals scored: 103 (3.43 per match)
- Biggest home win: Nita FA 9–0 Ardor FA (12 December 2023)
- Biggest away win: Ardor FA 0–11 Sports Odisha (10 December 2023)
- Highest scoring: Ardor FA 0–11 Sports Odisha (10 December 2023)
- All statistics correct as of 6 January 2024.

The 2023–24 Odisha Women's League was the 11th edition of the Odisha Women's League, the top Odia professional football league, since its establishment in 2011. Odisha FC are the defending champions, but are not participating in the current edition. The league is organised by the Football Association of Odisha (FAO), the official football governing body of Odisha, in association with the Department of Sports and Youth Services (DSYS) of the Government of Odisha.

== Teams ==
- Ardor Football Academy
- KIIT & KISS
- Nita Football Academy
- Odisha Government Press
- Rising Students Club
- Sports Odisha

== Venues ==
=== Choudwar ===
- OTM Ground

=== Bhubaneswar ===
- Unit-1 Ground

== League stage ==
Pos	Team	Pld	W	D	L	GF	GA	GD	Pts	Qualification
1	Nita FA	10	9	1	0	36	2	+34	28	Champions and qualification for the 2023–24 Indian Women's League 2
2	Odisha Government Press	10	6	2	2	17	3	+14	20	
3	KIIT & KISS	10	4	3	3	18	13	+5	15	
4	Rising Students Club	10	4	0	6	11	19	−8	12	
5	Sports Odisha	10	3	2	5	22	13	+9	11	
6	Ardor FA	10	0	0	10	0	54	−54	0	

Source: The Away End
Rules for classification: 1) points; 2) head-to-head points; 3) head-to-head goal difference; 4) goal difference; 5) number of goals scored; 6) drawing of lots
