= Birsa Munda Stadium =

Birsa Munda Stadium may refer to several sports stadiums in India:

- Birsa Munda Athletics Stadium, Ranchi
- Birsa Munda Football Stadium, Ranchi
- Birsa Munda Hockey Stadium, Ranchi
- Birsa Munda International Hockey Stadium, Rourkela
- Birsa Munda Athletic Stadium, Rourkela
