= 2020–21 Odisha Women's League =

Odisha Women's League
- Season: 2020–21
- Dates: 28 February - 27 March
- Champions: Rising Students Club (3rd title)
- Indian Women's League: Not held
- Matches: 30
- Goals: 112 (3.73 per match)
- Top goalscorer: Deepa Nayak (SAI-STC) (13 goals)
- Highest scoring: Odisha Sports Hostel 6–4 SAI-STC (15 March 2021)
- All statistics correct as of 27 March 2021.

The 2020–21 Odisha Women's League was the 8th edition of the Odisha Women's League, the top Odia professional football league, since its establishment in 2011. East Coast Railway are the defending champions. The league is organised by the Football Association of Odisha (FAO), the official football governing body of Odisha, in association with the Department of Sports and Youth Services (DSYS) of the Government of Odisha.

On 27 February 2021, during the press meet and jersey launch ceremony for the 2020–21 season, the league was rechristened as Odisha Women's League. The ceremony took place in the presence of Principal Secretary of Department of Sports and Youth Services, Vishal Kumar Dev, and the Honorary Secretary of the Football Association of Odisha (FAO), Avijit Paul, at the Kalinga Stadium. On 28 February 2021, R. Vineel Krishna, Special Secretary to the Chief Minister Naveen Patnaik, and Director of Department of Sports and Youth Services graced the opening ceremony of the season as the chief guest.

== Teams ==
Venues in Odisha

=== Personnel ===
Team	Head coach	Captain
East Coast Railway	(India) Biswajit Padhiary	(India) Manisa Panna
Odisha Government Press	(India) Sirajuddin Khan	(India) Sasmita Parida
Odisha Police	(India) Gayatri Mallick	(India) Manisha Tirkey
Odisha Sports Hostel	(India) Mamata Kumari Samanta	(India) Bannya Kabiraj
Rising Students Club	(India) Shaik Manzoor	(India) Satyabati Khadia
SAI-STC	(India) Abarna Selvaraj	(India) Eva Panna

=== Squads ===
East Coast Railway	Odisha Government Press	Odisha Police	Odisha Sports Hostel	Rising Students Club	SAI-STC Cuttack
Manisa Panna (C); Bishnupriya Mahanta; Deogi Murmu; Itishree Malik; Janjali Sahu; Juli Kishan; Laharee Mangaraj; Lochana Munda; Madhusmita Barik; Monica Minz; Pratima Minz; Sarojini Tirkey; Sonali Behera; Srijana Tamang; Suprabha Rout; Supriya Routray; Swarnamayee Samal; Tara Khatoon	Sasmita Parida (C); Anima Kritika Kumari; Arupriya Moharana; Janhabi Nayak; Jyotsna Kishan; Krishna Barick; Laxmipriya Lenka; Laxmipriya Moharana; Leepa Nayak; Manisha Behera; Pragyan Kishan; Sila Singh; Sonia Ekka; Sunita Swain; Suprava Barik; Twinkle Digal	Manisha Tirkey (C); Arati Anima Khadia; Hema Xaxa; Jabamani Soren; Jasmani Samad; Jyotsna Mallick; Karishma Oram; Parbati Kujur; Pravasini Parida; Sasmita Ekka; Sonali Oram; Swarnapriya Nayak; Tikina Samal	Bannya Kabiraj (C); Diptirani Kujur; Geeta Kishan; Gurubari Karjee; Malati Munda; Manisha Naik; Manju Ganjhu; Maxima Kujur; Pratima Jojo; Pratima Nayak; Salege Majhi; Sangeeta Das; Shanti Murmu; Shibani Mundari; Shridevi Hansdah; Spandita Das; Subhasmita Subhadarsini Das; Sumitra Hembram; Susmita Tanty	Satyabati Khadia (C); Ambruta Nayak; Ashrita Kangadi; Bharati Das; Janaki Murmu; Jasoda Munda; Jharana Mallik; Joshna Lakra; Kamini Munda; Pramila Kishan; Premsila Lugun; Runi Nayak; Sanjukta Tirkey; Sradhanjali Panda; Subhadra Nayak; Subhadra Sahu; Sumitra Xalxo; Susmita Dalei	Eva Panna (C); Deepa Nayak; Gudiya Kumari; Jyoti Dalei; Nikita Bishi; Pragyanjali Nayak; Pushpa Yadav; Soni Behera; Suman Pragyan Mohapatra; Sunita Soren; Swetapadma Sahoo; Varsha Mahakud

== Standings ==
Pos	Team	Pld	W	D	L	GF	GA	GD	Pts	Qualification
1	Rising Students Club (C)	10	9	0	1	28	7	+21	27	Qualification for the 2020–21 Indian Women's League
2	East Coast Railway	10	9	0	1	25	5	+20	27	
3	Odisha Sports Hostel	10	5	1	4	29	19	+10	16	
4	SAI-STC	10	3	2	5	19	26	−7	11	
5	Odisha Police	10	1	1	8	5	23	−18	4	
6	Odisha Government Press	10	1	0	9	6	32	−26	3	

Source: Orisports
Rules for classification: 1) points; 2) head-to-head points; 3) head-to-head goal difference; 4) goal difference; 5) number of goals scored; 6) drawing of lots
(C) Champions

== Statistics ==
=== Scoring ===
As of 27 March 2021

==== Top scorers ====
Rank	Player	Club	Goals
1	(India) Deepa Nayak	SAI-STC	13
2	(India) Manisha Naik	Odisha Sports Hostel	11
2	(India) Sarojini Tirkey	East Coast Railway	11
3	(India) Jasoda Munda	Rising Students Club	10
4	(India) Satyabati Khadia	Rising Students Club	9
5	(India) Tara Khatoon	East Coast Railway	6
6	(India) Malati Munda	Odisha Sports Hostel	4
6	(India) Sumitra Xalxo	Rising Students Club	4
6	(India) Supriya Routray	East Coast Railway	4
7	(India) Bannya Kabiraj	Odisha Sports Hostel	3
7	(India) Diptirani Kujur	Odisha Sports Hostel	3
7	(India) Jyoti Dalei	SAI-STC	3
7	(India) Susmita Tanty	Odisha Sports Hostel	3
8	(India) Anima Kritika Kumari	Odisha Government Press	2
8	(India) Karishma Oram	Odisha Police	2
8	(India) Lahari Mangaraj	East Coast Railway	2
8	(India) Laxmipriya Lenka	Odisha Government Press	2
8	(India) Sonali Behera	East Coast Railway	2
8	(India) Subhadra Sahu	Rising Students Club	2
9	(India) Bharati Das	Rising Students Club	1
9	(India) Eva Panna	SAI-STC	1
9	(India) Geeta Kishan	Odisha Sports Hostel	1
9	(India) Gudiya Kumari	SAI-STC	1
9	(India) Janjali Sahu	East Coast Railway	1
9	(India) Jasmani Samad	Odisha Police	1
9	(India) Jyotsna Mallick	Odisha Police	1
9	(India) Kamini Munda	Rising Students Club	1
9	(India) Pragyan Kishan	Odisha Government Press	1
9	(India) Pratima Minz	East Coast Railway	1
9	(India) Sangeeta Das	Odisha Sports Hostel	1
9	(India) Sonia Ekka	Odisha Government Press	1
9	(India) Sonali Oram	Odisha Police	1
9	(India) Sridevi Hansdah	Odisha Sports Hostel	1
9	(India) Sumitra Hembram	Odisha Sports Hostel	1
9	(India) Varsha Mahakud	SAI-STC	1
Source: Orisports

==== Hat-tricks ====
Player	For	Against	Result	Date
(India) Malati Munda	Odisha Sports Hostel	Odisha Police	6–1	28 February 2021
(India) Manisha Naik	Odisha Sports Hostel	Odisha Police	6–1	28 February 2021
(India) Satyabati Khadia	Rising Students Club	Odisha Police	3–1	8 March 2021
(India) Diptirani Kujur	Odisha Sports Hostel	SAI-STC	6–4	15 March 2021
(India) Deepa Nayak	SAI-STC	Odisha Sports Hostel	4–6	15 March 2021
(India) Deepa Nayak	SAI-STC	Odisha Government Press	7–2	24 March 2021
(India) Jyoti Dalei	SAI-STC	Odisha Government Press	7–2	24 March 2021
(India) Jasoda Munda	Rising Students Club	SAI-STC	3–0	27 March 2021
Source: Orisports

Result column shows goal tally of player's team first.

==== Own-goals ====
Player	Against	Result	Date
(India) Salege Majhi (Odisha Sports Hostel)	Rising Students Club	2–4	18 March 2021
Source: Orisports

Result column shows goal tally of player's team first.
