= Monalisha Devi Moirangthem =

Indian footballer

Monalisha Devi
Personal information
- Full name: Monalisha Devi Moirangthem
- Date of birth: 3 July 2006 (age 20)
- Place of birth: Manipur, India
- Height: 1.75 m (5 ft 9 in)
- Position: Goalkeeper

Team information
- Current team: Nita

Senior career*
Years	Team	Apps	(Gls)
- KRYPHSA
–2023	Kickstart		
2023–2024	Odisha		
2024–2026	Sreebhumi		
2026–	Nita		

International career^{‡}
2022	India U17		
2024	India U20	12	(0)
2025–	India	4	(0)
- * Club domestic league appearances and goals ‡ National team caps and goals as of 11 October 2026

Monalisha Devi Moirangthem (Meitei: Moirangthem Monalisha Devi, born 3 July 2006) is an Indian professional footballer from Manipur. She plays as a goalkeeper for the Indian Women's League club Nita and the India women's national football team.

== Early life ==
Monalisha was born in Thoubal district, Manipur, India. At a very young age she started playing at the football ground next to her house along with Melody Chanu, another goalkeeper in the India under 17 team in 2022.

== Career ==
Monalisha was part of the Indian team that played the FIFA women's U-17 women's World Cup at Bhubaneswar, India. India player against Brazil, Morocco and United States from 11 to 30 October 2022.

She was selected for the SAFF U-20 Women's Championship to be held in Dhaka, Bangladesh in February 2024.

She was also selected for the Indian team to take part in the Turkish Women's Cup 2024 in Alanya, Turkey, from 21 to 27 February 2024.

On 14 July 2025, she was part of the India U20 women's national team that drew 1–1 against Uzbekistan in the first of two friendlies at the Do’stlik Stadium, in Tashkent. The Indian under 20 team which had a camp at the Padukone-Dravid Centre for Sports Excellence in Bengaluru before leaving for Tashkent are preparing for the AFC U20 Women's Asian Cup Qualifiers in August 2025, where the other teams are Indonesia, Turkmenistan and hosts Myanmar.

=== Senior India debut ===
Monalisha made her Senior India debut at Bengaluru in May 2025, along with defender Shubhangi Singh, against the Uzbekistan senior team in the two FIFA friendlies which India lost 0–1 in both matches. Bothe were in the match-day squads.

On 5 July 2025, she was also part of the senior India team in Thailand that secured a berth qualifying in Group B for the AFC Women's Asia Cup 2026. She played one match and later joined the U20 camp on 20 July.

== Career statistics ==
=== International ===
As of 11 October 2026

National team	Year	Caps	Goals
India	2025	2	0
India	2026	2	0
Total		4	0

== Honours ==
Odisha

- Indian Women's League: 2023–24

Manipur

- Rajmata Jijabai Trophy: 2023–24
