= 2019–20 FAO Women's League =

FAO Women's League
- Season: 2019–20
- Dates: 27 November - 30 December
- Champions: East Coast Railway (3rd title)
- Indian Women's League: Odisha Police
- Matches: 20
- Goals: 34 (1.7 per match)
- Biggest home win: Odisha Police 4–1 Rising Student's Club (11 December 2019)
- Biggest away win: Rising Student's Club 0–3 East Coast Railway (15 December 2019)
- Highest scoring: Odisha Police 4–1 Rising Student's Club (11 December 2019)
- All statistics correct as of 1 January 2020.

The 2019–20 FAO Women's League was the 7th edition of the FAO Women's League. SAI-STC Cuttack were the defending champions. The FAO Women's League (FWL) is organised every year by the Football Association of Odisha (FAO), the official football governing body of Odisha, India. The regular season started on 20 February 2019 and ended on 9 March 2019. Sangeeta Sharma, Joint Secretary (FAO), and Geetanjali Khuntia (Ex-Indian International) were the chief guests in the inauguration ceremony. On 30 December 2019, East Coast Railway were crowned the champions, garnering fifteen points from eight matches.

== Teams ==
- East Coast Railway
- Odisha Police
- Odisha Sports Hostel
- Rising Student's Club
- SAI-STC Cuttack

== Venues ==
Venues of the FAO Football League

=== Cuttack ===
- Odisha Police Ground
- Ravenshaw University Ground
- Sports Hostel Ground

== League stage ==
| Pos | Team | Pld | W | D | L | GF | GA | GD | Pts | Qualification |
|---|---|---|---|---|---|---|---|---|---|---|
| 1 | East Coast Railway (C) | 8 | 4 | 3 | 1 | 11 | 5 | +6 | 15 | |
| 2 | Odisha Police | 8 | 3 | 4 | 1 | 9 | 4 | +5 | 13 | Qualification for the 2019–20 Indian Women's League |
| 3 | Odisha Sports Hostel | 8 | 2 | 5 | 1 | 6 | 6 | 0 | 11 | |
| 4 | Rising Student's Club | 8 | 1 | 4 | 3 | 5 | 9 | −4 | 7 | |
| 5 | SAI-STC Cuttack | 8 | 0 | 4 | 4 | 3 | 10 | −7 | 4 | |

Source: Orisports
Rules for classification: 1) points; 2) head-to-head points; 3) head-to-head goal difference; 4) goal difference; 5) number of goals scored; 6) drawing of lots

Note: The winner of the league stage would qualify for the 2019–20 Indian Women's League.
