= 2021–22 Odisha Women's League =

Odisha Women's League
- Season: 2021–22
- Dates: 12 February - 15 March
- Champions: Odisha Police (1st title)
- Indian Women's League: Odisha Police; Sports Odisha
- Matches: 30
- Goals: 101 (3.37 per match)
- Highest scoring: Odisha Police 9–0 Rising Students Club (28 February 2022)

The 2021–22 Odisha Women's League was the 9th edition of the Odisha Women's League, the top Odia professional football league, since its establishment in 2011. Rising Students Club are the defending champions. The league is organised by the Football Association of Odisha (FAO), the official football governing body of Odisha, in association with the Department of Sports and Youth Services (DSYS) of the Government of Odisha.

On 10 February 2022, the jersey launch ceremony for the 2021–22 season was held in the presence of Principal Secretary of the Department of Sports and Youth Services, Vineel Krishna, and the Honorary Secretary of the Football Association of Odisha (FAO), Avijit Paul, at the Kalinga Stadium. The captains and vice-captains of the six participating teams were also present during the jersey launch ceremony. On 12 February 2022, Sailendra Kumar Jena, Joint Secretary of the Department of Sports and Youth Services and the guest of honour for the Opening Ceremony, declared the season open. Odisha Police finished the season unbeaten and clinched their first ever Odisha Women's League title.

== Teams ==
Venues in Odisha

=== Personnel ===
Team	Head coach	Captain
East Coast Railway	(India) Biswajit Padhiary	(India) Manisa Panna
Odisha Government Press	(India) Sirajuddin Khan	(India) Sasmita Parida
Odisha Police	(India) Mohammad Shahid Jabbar	(India) Pyari Xaxa
Sports Odisha	(India) Sarita Behera	(India) Bannya Kabiraj
Rising Students Club	(India) Shaik Manzoor	(India) Shradhanjali Panda
SAI-STC	(India) Abarna Selvaraj	(India) Pushpa Yadav

== Standings ==
Pos	Team	Pld	W	D	L	GF	GA	GD	Pts	Qualification
1	Odisha Police (C)	10	9	1	0	45	2	+43	28	Qualification for the 2021–22 Indian Women's League
2	Sports Odisha	10	6	2	2	17	13	+4	20	Qualification for the 2021–22 Indian Women's League
3	East Coast Railway	10	6	1	3	19	10	+9	19	
4	Rising Students Club	10	3	0	7	10	28	−18	9	
5	Odisha Government Press	10	2	0	8	6	20	−14	6	
6	SAI-STC	10	2	0	8	4	28	−24	6	

Source: Orisports FAO
Rules for classification: 1) points; 2) head-to-head points; 3) head-to-head goal difference; 4) goal difference; 5) number of goals scored; 6) drawing of lots
(C) Champions

== Friendlies ==
Odisha state under-18 women's team played developmental friendlies with Rising Student Club, Odisha Government Press, and Odisha Police and weren't a part of the points table.

6 March 2022 Friendly	Odisha U18	2–1	Rising Student Club	Bhubaneswar, Odisha
	Malati Munda; Malati Munda	Report	Subhadra Sahoo	Stadium: Kalinga Stadium

8 March 2022 Friendly	Odisha U18	1–0	Odisha Government Press	Bhubaneswar, Odisha
		Report		Stadium: Kalinga Stadium

11 March 2022 Friendly	Odisha U18	0–5	Odisha Police	Bhubaneswar, Odisha
		Report		Stadium: Kalinga Stadium
