= Viksit Bara =

Indian football player

Personal information
- Date of birth: 8 April 2008 (age 18)
- Place of birth: Gumla district, Jharkhand, India
- Position: Defender

Team information
- Current team: Nita
- Number: 5

Senior career*
Years	Team	Apps	(Gls)
- Jharkhand
2024–2025	Indian Arrows		
2025–	Nita		

International career^{‡}
2023	India U17		
2025–	India U20	5	(0)
2024–	India	2	(0)
- * Club domestic league appearances and goals ‡ National team caps and goals as of 2 January 2025

Viksit Bara (born 8 April 2008) is an Indian professional footballer from Jharkhand. She plays as a defender for the Indian Women's League club Nita and the India national football team. She has also represented Jharkhand in the senior national championships.

== Early life ==
Bara is from Gumla, Jharkhand.

== Career ==
=== Domestic ===
She played the 29th Senior Women's National football championship for Jharkhand in October 2024. In August 2024, she played for Jharkhand in the Junior Girls National Football Championship Tier 1 at RDT Stadium in Anantapur, Andhra Pradesh. They finished second losing to Manipur in the finals 2–0.

=== International ===
She was selected in the 23-player Indian squad by Indian coach Joakim Alexandersson and she played the two FIFA international friendlies against Maldives on 30 December and 2 January at the Padukone-Dravid Centre for Sports Excellence in Bengaluru. She made her senior India debut as a substitute in the first match on 30 December in the 64th minute replacing Sorokhaibam Ranjana Chanu. In April 2023, she played for India in the AFC Under 17 Women's Asian Cup Qualifiers Indonesia 2024 at Bishkek, Kyrgyzstan where India defeat Kyrgyz Republic 1–0. She also played the AFC Under 17 Women's Asian Cup Qualifiers in September 2023 at Indonesia. She was selected for the Indian under 20 women team for Pink Ladies Youth Cup played at Turkey in February 2025.

== Career statistics ==
=== International ===
As of 2 January 2025

National team	Year	Caps	Goals
India	2024	1	0
India	2025	1	0
Total		2	0
