= Manisa Panna =

Indian footballer (born 1991)

Personal information
- Full name: Manisa Panna
- Date of birth: 20 April 1991 (age 35)
- Place of birth: Dandiapalli, Sundergarh, Odisha, India
- Position: Defender

Team information
- Current team: Nita
- Number: 3

Senior career*
Years	Team	Apps	(Gls)
2016–2017	Rising Students Club	11	(1)
2018	Eastern Sporting Union		
2019	Kolhapur City		
2020–2021	Gokulam Kerala		
2022	Sports Odisha	11	(0)
2022–2023	East Coast Railway		
2023–2024	Odisha		
2024–	Nita		

International career^{‡}
2015–	India	31	(0)
- * Club domestic league appearances and goals ‡ National team caps and goals as of 1 November 2023

Manisa Panna (also Manisha, born 20 April 1991) is an Indian professional footballer who plays as a defender for the Indian Women's League club Nita and the India women's national football team. She was part of the team at the 2015–16 AFC Women's Olympic Qualifying Tournament. She previously played for Gokulam Kerala and Odisha in the Indian Women's League.

== International career ==
Manisa was part of the Indian team since 2015 and plays as a defender in the national team. She first played in the 2015-16 AFC Women's Olympic Qualifying Tournament. Later she also played in the South Asian Games and 2016 SAFF Women's Championship.

== Career statistics ==
=== International ===
As of 1 November 2023

International caps and goals
Year	Caps	Goals
2015	1	0
2016	7	0
2017	7	0
2018	2	0
2019	0	0
2021	5	0
2022	4	0
2023	5	0
Total	31	0

== Honours ==
India

- SAFF Women's Championship: 2016
- South Asian Games Gold medal: 2016

Odisha

- Indian Women's League: 2023–24

Gokulam Kerala

- Indian Women's League: 2019–20

Odisha (state)

- Rajmata Jijabai Trophy: 2010–11
- National Games Silver medal: 2022

Railways

- Rajmata Jijabai Trophy: 2015–16
