= 2018–19 FAO Women's League =

FAO Women's League
- Season: 2018–19
- Dates: 20 February - 9 March
- Champions: SAI-STC Cuttack (1st title)
- Indian Women's League: SAI-STC Cuttack
- Matches: 10
- Goals: 26 (2.6 per match)
- Top goalscorer: Nikita Bishi; SAI-STC Cuttack (4 goals)
- Biggest home win: Odisha Sports Hostel 5-0 Bidanasi Club (28 February 2019)
- Biggest away win: SAI-STC Cuttack 4-0 Odisha Sports Hostel (26 February 2019)
- Highest scoring: Odisha Sports Hostel 5-0 Bidanasi Club (28 February 2019); Odisha Police 4-1 Bidanasi Club (20 February 2019)
- Longest winless run: Rising Student's Club (4 matches)
- All statistics correct as of 8 May 2019.

The 2018–19 FAO Women's League was the 6th edition of the FAO Women's League. Rising Student's Club were the defending champions. The FAO Women's League (FWL) is organised every year by the Football Association of Odisha (FAO), the official football governing body of Odisha, India. The regular season started on 20 February 2019 and ended on 9 March 2019.

== Teams ==
- Bidanasi Club
- Odisha Police
- Odisha Sports Hostel
- Rising Student's Club
- SAI-STC Cuttack

== Venues ==
Venues of the FAO Football League

=== Bhubaneswar ===
- Kalinga Stadium

=== Cuttack ===
- Barabati Stadium
- Odisha Police Ground
- Satyabrata Stadium
- Shatabdi Vihar Football Ground

== League stage ==
Pos	Team	Pld	W	D	L	GF	GA	GD	Pts	Qualification
1	SAI-STC Cuttack (champions)	4	2	2	0	7	1	+6	8	Qualification for the 2018–19 Indian Women's League
2	Odisha Police (runners-up)	4	2	2	0	6	2	+4	8	
3	Odisha Sports Hostel	4	2	0	2	8	6	+2	6	
4	Bidanasi Club	4	1	0	3	3	12	−9	3	
5	Rising Student's Club	4	0	2	2	2	5	−3	2	

Source: Orisports
Rules for classification: 1) points; 2) head-to-head points; 3) head-to-head goal difference; 4) goal difference; 5) number of goals scored; 6) drawing of lots

Note: The winner of the league stage would qualify for the 2018–19 Indian Women's League season.

=== Matches ===
20 February 2019	Odisha Police	4–1	Bidanasi Club	Cuttack
14:30 IST	Jabamani Soren 47'; Alochana Senapati 53'; 82' (o.g.); Karishma Oram 86'		Manasini Bhoi 12'	Stadium: Reserve Police Ground

22 February 2019	SAI-STC Cuttack	1–1	Rising Student's Club	Cuttack
14:30 IST	Nikita Bishi 28'		Subhadra Sahu 50'	Stadium: Satyabrata Stadium

24 February 2019	SAI-STC Cuttack	0–0	Odisha Police	Cuttack
14:30 IST				Stadium: Reserve Police Ground

24 February 2019	Bidanasi Club	2–1	Rising Student's Club	Cuttack
14:30 IST	Jyoshna Kishan 28'; 70' (o.g.)		Subhadra Sahu 8'	Stadium: Bidanasi Ground

26 February 2019	SAI-STC Cuttack	4–0	Odisha Sports Hostel	Bhubaneswar
14:30 IST	Deepa Nayak 20'; Nikita Bishi 72', 76', 78'			Stadium: Kalinga Stadium

28 February 2019	Odisha Sports Hostel	5–0	Bidanasi Club	Bhubaneswar
14:30 IST	Samita Tanty 24'; Mitali Munda 25', 76'; Diptirani Kujur 50'; Sarita Soreng 80'			Stadium: Kalinga Stadium

5 March 2019	Odisha Sports Hostel	2–0	Rising Student's Club	Bhubaneswar
14:30 IST	Susmita Tanty 39'; Damayanti Tiriya 45'			Stadium: Kalinga Stadium

7 March 2019	Odisha Police	0–0	Rising Student's Club	Cuttack
14:30 IST				Stadium: Reserve Police Ground

7 March 2019	SAI-STC Cuttack	2–0	Bidanasi Club	Cuttack
14:30 IST	Deepa Nayak 35'; Rashmi 91'			Stadium: Bidansi Ground

9 March 2019	Odisha Police	2–1	Odisha Sports Hostel	Cuttack
14:30 IST	Alochana Senapati 89'; Satyabadi Khadia 90+3'		Susmita Tanty 61'	Stadium: Bidanasi Ground

== Statistics ==
=== Top scorers ===
As of 9 May 2019

Rank	Player	Club	Goals
1	(India) Nikita Bishi	SAI-STC Cuttack	4
2	(India) Susmita Tanty	Odisha Sports Hostel	3
3	(India) Alochana Senapati	Odisha Police	2
3	(India) Deepa Nayak	SAI-STC Cuttack	2
3	(India) Mitali Munda	Odisha Sports Hostel	2
3	(India) Subhadra Sahu	Rising Student's Club	2
4	(India) Damayanti Tiriya	Odisha Sports Hostel	1
4	(India) Diptirani Kujur	Odisha Sports Hostel	1
4	(India) Jabamani Soren	Odisha Police	1
4	(India) Jyoshna Kishan	Bidanasi Club	1
4	(India) Karishma Oram	Odisha Police	1
4	(India) Manasini Bhoi	Bidanasi Club	1
4	(India) Rashmi	SAI-STC Cuttack	1
4	(India) Sarita Soreng	Odisha Sports Hostel	1
4	(India) Satyabadi Khadia	Odisha Police	1

==== Hat-tricks ====
Player	For	Against	Result	Date
(India) Nikita Bishi	SAI-STC	Odisha Sports Hostel	4–0	28 February 2019
