= Birsa Munda Athletic Stadium =

Stadium in India

- Interactive map of Birsa Munda Athletic Stadium
- Full name: Birsa Munda Athletic Stadium
- Location: Rourkela, India
- Coordinates: 22.225°N 84.868°E
- Owner: Government of Odisha
- Capacity: 9,000
- Surface: Synthetic track (Athletics); Natural turf (Football)
- Scoreboard: Yes

Construction
- Opened: 2023

Tenants
- Nita Football Academy; Samaleswari SC

Birsa Munda Athletic Stadium is a stadium in Rourkela, Odisha, India. It is used mostly for football matches and athletics. It has seating capacity of 9000 spectators, including accessible seating.

== History ==
On 10 March 2023, Chief Minister Naveen Patnaik inaugurated the Birsa Munda Athletic Stadium Complex in Rourkela, Odisha. This facility is part of a broader initiative to develop Sundargarh district, which has a strong reputation for producing national and international athletes.

== Facilities ==
The Birsa Munda Athletic Stadium Complex is a state-of-the-art facility designed to host athletics and football events. The stadium includes a 400-meter synthetic athletics track and a natural turf football field, equipped with floodlights to facilitate nighttime events. It has a seating capacity of more than 9,000 spectators, including accessible seating for disabled individuals. The complex spans 11 acres and was developed with a total project cost of over ₹148 crore.

== Events ==
The stadium hosts the home matches of Nita Football Academy in the Indian Women's League.
