= Suicide of Prakriti Lamsal =

Suicide of a Nepali student in India

- Date: 16 February 2025
- Location: Kalinga Institute of Industrial Technology, Bhubaneswar, Odisha, India
- Type: Suicide
- Cause: Alleged harassment and institutional negligence.
- Participants: Prakriti Lamsal

On 16 February 2025, Nepali B.Tech student Prakriti Lamsal was found dead in her hostel at KIIT Bhubaneswar, Odisha, India, in a suspected suicide. Protests erupted as students alleged harassment and institutional negligence. The university ordered all Nepali students to vacate, leaving many stranded. Police arrested a male student in connection with the case, while the Nepali Embassy intervened. Investigations are ongoing amid rising tensions.

== Background ==
Prakriti Lamsal was a student from Siddharthanagar, Bhairahawa, in the Rupandehi District of Nepal. She was pursuing her higher studies at the Kalinga Institute of Industrial Technology (KIIT) in Bhubaneswar, Odisha, India. She was found dead in her hostel room on 16 February 2025 in what appeared to be a suicide.

== Incident ==
Lamsal was found dead in her hostel room at the Kalinga Institute of Industrial Technology on 16 February 2025. Her body was discovered by her roommate, who became concerned after not hearing from her for a while. The roommate went to check on her and found Lamsal unresponsive. The incident was immediately reported to university authorities.

Lamsal had last communicated with her family earlier that day, mentioning that she was heading to a campus event. Her father reported that she had called her mother at around 2:51 PM, sounding normal and mentioning her plans. However, later that afternoon, the family was informed by university authorities between 5 PM and 5:30 PM about her death.

Details surrounding the exact method of her death have not been publicly disclosed, but the incident was classified as a suicide following the autopsy report. On February 18, 2025, police handed over the body of Prakriti Lamsal to her family following an autopsy.

== Aftermath ==
KIIT initially issued suspension notices to over 1100 Nepali students, instructing them to vacate their campus housing. This decision led to widespread protests from the Nepali student community, who raised concerns about harassment and the handling of complaints. The university later retracted the suspension notices, allowing the students to return.

During the protests, some students reported instances of verbal abuse by university staff. In one incident, a staff member reportedly made a remark comparing the university's budget to Nepal's, which was perceived as insensitive. The staff member later apologized, stating that the comment was made "on the spur of the moment." Odisha Police arrested five university staffers for actions related to efforts to remove Nepali students from campus.

The Odisha Higher Education Department summoned KIIT founder Achyuta Samanta for discussions regarding the events surrounding Prakriti's death and the university's response. Authorities also planned forensic tests to further investigate the case. The Nepali Embassy in India intervened to ensure a thorough investigation into Prakriti's death and address the concerns of Nepali students studying in India.

On 10 April 2025, Odisha High Court issued an interim stay on proceedings initiated by India's NHRC(National Human Rights Commission).
