= Mohammad Shahid Jabbar =

Indian football manager (born 1965)

Mohammad Jabbar
Personal information
- Full name: Mohammad Shahid Jabbar
- Date of birth: 5 May 1965 (age 61)
- Place of birth: Cuttack, Orissa, India
- Position: Forward

Senior career*
Years	Team	Apps	(Gls)
1980–1984	Chand Club		
1984–1998	Orissa Police		

Managerial career
- 1998–2007: Orissa Police
- 2007–2008: Odisha Women
- 2009–2012: India Women
- 2023: Odisha Women
- * Club domestic league appearances and goals

Mohammad Shahid Jabbar is an Indian football coach and former footballer. He served as the head coach of the India women's national football team from 2010 to 2012, and currently as the head coach of Odisha women's football team.

== Playing career ==
Jabbar played for Chand club in the local league and also represented Odisha in the Santosh Trophy at the 1993 and 1995 editions.

== Coaching career ==
=== India Women: 2009–2012 ===
Jabbar took over the reins of the Indian women's team in 2009 following years of inactivity since 2007 and took part in his first tournament as coach in January 2010 during the 2010 South Asian Games in Bangladesh. Jabbar led the India Women to the final where they faced Nepal. India Women managed to win the tournament by defeating Nepal 3–1. This was India's first ever championship in women's football. Jabbar then led the India Women to the 2010 SAFF Women's Championship in which they defeated Nepal again in the final on 23 December 2010 in Cox's Bazar by a score of 1–0. Jabbar then led the India Women into the 2012 Olympic Qualifiers in which they were placed in Group B along with Bangladesh and Uzbekistan; India ended in 2nd in the group and eliminated after losing 1–5 to Uzbekistan in a play-off to decide who would go on to the next round.

Jabbar also coached the Indian team at the 2012 SAFF Women's Championship, where they successfully defended their title by beating Nepal.

== Honours ==
=== Manager ===
India Women

- SAFF Women's Championship: 2010, 2012
- South Asian Games Gold medal: 2010
