= Nita Football Academy =

- Full name: Nita Football Academy
- Short name: Nita FA
- Founded: 2011; 15 years ago
- Ground: Dhabaleswar Institute of Polytechnic Ground
- Owner: Nita Football Trust
- Chairman: Subrat Das
- Head coach: Paromita Sit
- League: M: FAO Second Division League; W: Indian Women's League; Odisha Women's League
- 2024–25: Indian Women's League, 6th of 8 Odisha Women's League, Champions
- Website: nitafootball.com
Home colours	Away colours	Third colours

Nita Football Academy is an Indian professional football club and academy based in Radha Damodarpur, Cuttack, Odisha. It is the first private residential football academy of Odisha, dedicated to promoting football among underprivileged girls. They are the current champions of the Odisha Women's League and Khelo India State Championships U-17. Many of the academy students have represented at sub-junior, junior, and senior national levels. They finished as runners-up in the 2023–24 season of the Indian Women's League 2, which enabled promotion to the top tier Indian Women's League.

== History ==
Established in 2011, Nita Football Academy was founded by the Nita Football Trust with the mission of promoting football, particularly among underprivileged girls. The academy is affiliated to Cuttack District Athletic Association, Football Association of Odisha (FAO), and were conditionally accredited as an Advanced Private Residential Academy by the All India Football Federation (AIFF). Its headquarters are located at Dhabaleswar Institute of Polytechnique, Radha Damodarpur, Khuntuni, near Cuttack, and they will be playing the Indian Women's League 2024-25 at the Birsa Munda Athletic Stadium at Rourkela as their home ground.

The academy has girls in under-19, under-17, and under-15 categories training under supporting coaches, administrative staff, matron, hostel facilities, full-fledged canteen, physiotherapist, ambulance services, on-call doctor and an advanced gymnasium. The academy also takes care of the player’s education by providing facilities in the technical education and in nearby school and colleges. The academy also operates in Puri to train students using the infrastructure facilities of Puri Zilla School.

The men's section joined FAO Second Division League in 2026 season where finished as semi-finalists.

== Squad ==
As of 13 November 2026

Note: Flags indicate national team as defined under FIFA eligibility rules; some limited exceptions apply. Players may hold more than one non-FIFA nationality.

No.	Pos.	Nation	Player
1	GK	IND	Monalisha Devi Moirangthem
2	DF	GHA	Joyce Asamoah
4	DF	IND	Elizabed Lakra
5	DF	IND	Pratima Bangal
6	DF	IND	Kritina Devi Thounaojam
7	FW	IND	Neha Sillay
11	FW	GHA	Kadidja Ibrahim Teme
12	MF	IND	Bhumika Devi Khumukcham
14	MF	IND	Cindy Colney (captain)
16	MF	IND	Tamanna
17	MF	IND	Ipshita Rout
18	DF	IND	Viksit Bara
19	FW	IND	Rukmani Murmu

No.	Pos.	Nation	Player
20	FW	IND	Sibani Devi Nongmeikapam
21	GK	IND	Sakro Hembram
24	MF	IND	Lipi Kishan
25	DF	IND	K. Ngopawdi
27	FW	IND	Sikha Malik
31	GK	IND	Susmita Pun
50	MF	IND	Thandamoni Baskey
60	MF	GHA	Matilda Kwao
73	MF	IND	Ritu Badaik
75	DF	IND	Ambalika Khundongbam

== Management ==
Position	Name
Chairman	(India) Subrat Das
President	(India) Bhakta Ballav Das
General Secretary	(India) Arun Parija
Chief Technical Advisor	(India) Mohammad Shahid Jabbar

== Honours ==
=== Domestic ===
- Indian Women's League 2
  - Runners-up (1): 2023–24

=== Regional ===
- Odisha Women's League
  - Champions (3): 2023–24, 2024–25 2026
- FAO Inter Club Futsal Championship
  - Champions (1): 2025

=== Youth ===
- Women's Youth League (U17)
  - Runners-up (1): 2026–27
