= Odisha Women's League =

- Organising body: FAO (Odisha)
- Founded: 15 August 2011; 14 years ago
- Country: India
- Number of clubs: 6
- Level on pyramid: 3
- Promotion to: Indian Women's League 2
- Current champions: Nita Football Academy (2nd title) (2024–25)
- Most championships: East Coast Railway; Rising Students Club (3 titles)
- Broadcaster(s): FA Odisha (YouTube); SportsKPI
- Current: 2026 Odisha Women's League

The Odisha Women's League (OWL), also known as the FAO Women's League, is the women's top division football league of Odisha, India. The league is among the existing top tier women's football leagues in India. The league is organised every year by the apex football governing body of Odisha, the Football Association of Odisha (FAO), in association with the Department of Sports and Youth Services (DSYS) of the Government of Odisha. It is currently contested by 6 clubs across the state.

Since the inception of the Odisha Women's League, a total of four clubs have been crowned champions. East Coast Railway and Rising Students Club have won the most titles in league history, being crowned champions thrice. Chand Club, Odisha Police, and SAI-STC have won it once.

== History ==
Odisha Women's League was brought up as AT Group Women's Football League in the year 2011 as Odisha's premier level women's football league. The Football Association of Odisha (FAO) introduced the league system to provide a platform for women to showcase their footballing abilities. The league system eventually continued to be a hit among the footballing enthusiasts of Odisha. Footballing talents from the FAO Women's League are recruited in the Odisha women's football team, and eventually in India women's national football team.

On 27 February 2021, during the press meet and jersey launch ceremony for the 2020-21 season, the league was rechristened as Odisha Women's League. The Department of Sports and Youth Services Principal Secretary and Honorary Secretary of Football Association of Odisha (FAO) attended the ceremony at Kalinga Stadium.

== Venues ==
Venues for FAO Leagues in Odisha

=== Bhubaneswar ===
- Kalinga Stadium
- Capital High School Ground (Capital Football Arena)
- OSAP 7th Battalion Ground (Odisha Football Academy Ground)
- Unit-1 Ground (Bhubaneswar Football Academy Ground)

=== Cuttack ===
- Barabati Stadium
- Odisha Police Ground
- Ravenshaw University Ground
- Sports Hostel Ground

=== Choudwar ===
- OTM Ground

== Clubs ==
Club	Location	No. of seasons	First app	Last app	Best finish
Ardor Football Academy	Bhubaneswar	1	2023–24		6th (2023–24)
Aul Women's FC	Aul	1	2026		4th in Final round (2026)
Bidanasi Club	Cuttack	1	2018–19		4th (2018–19)
Buxi Jagabandhu Club	Bargarh	1	2024–25		11th (2024–25)
Chand Club	Cuttack	4	2011	2017	Runners-Up (2011, 2012)
Chauliaganj Club	Cuttack	2	2011	2012	Group stage (2011, 2012)
East Coast Railway	Bhubaneswar	8	2012	2022–23	Champions (2012, 2015, 2019–20)
Ganjam XI	Brahmapur	1	2026		Group stage (2026)
KIIT & KIIS	Bhubaneswar	3	2023–24	2026	3rd (2023–24)
Mangala Club	Cuttack	4	2011	2015	Semi-finalist (2011, 2015)
Manorama Club	Deogarh	2	2024–25	2026	10th (2024–25)
Morning Club	Cuttack	1	2011		Group stage (2011)
Nita Football Academy	Cuttack	3	2023–24	2026	Champions (2023–24, 2024–25, 2026)
Odisha FC	Bhubaneswar	1	2022–23		Champions (2022–23)
Odisha Government Press	Cuttack	6	2020–21	2026	Runners-Up (2023–24)
Odisha Police	Cuttack	11	2011	2026	Champions (2021–22)
Radha Gobinda Club	Cuttack	3	2011	2015	Group stage (2011, 2012, 2015)
Radha Raman Club	Cuttack	2	2011	2012	Champions (2011)
Rising Students Club	Cuttack	10	2011	2024–25	Champions (2013, 2017, 2020–21)
SAI-STC Cuttack	Cuttack	5	2017	2021–22	Champions (2018–19)
Sports Odisha	Bhubaneswar	11	2013	2026	Runners-Up (2015, 2017, 2021–22, 2024–25)
SRM Sporting Club	Umerkote	1	2026		Group stage (2026)
Sunrise Club	Cuttack	2	2011	2015	Group stage (2011, 2015)
Sunshine Club	Cuttack	4	2011	2015	Group stage (2011, 2012, 2015)
Tarini Football Academy	Keonjhar	2	2024–25	2026	5th in Final round (2026)
Tata Steel Foundation	Joda	2	2024–25	2026	8th (2024–25)
Young Association Kuarmunda	Sundergarh	2	2024–25	2026	5th (2024–25)

== Championships ==
Season	Champion	Runners-up
2011	Radha Raman Club	Chand Club
2012	East Coast Railway	Chand Club
2013	Rising Students Club	East Coast Railway
2015	East Coast Railway	Sports Odisha
2017	Rising Students Club	Sports Odisha
2018–19	SAI-STC	Odisha Police
2019–20	East Coast Railway	Odisha Police
2020–21	Rising Students Club	East Coast Railway
2021–22	Odisha Police	Sports Odisha
2022–23	Odisha FC	East Coast Railway
2023–24	Nita Football Academy	Odisha Government Press
2024–25	Nita Football Academy	Sports Odisha
2026	Nita Football Academy	Odisha Police

=== Championships by team ===
Club	Titles	Runners-up	Winning seasons
East Coast Railway	3	1	2012, 2015, 2019–20
Rising Students Club	3	0	2013, 2017, 2020–21
Nita Football Academy	3	0	2023–24, 2024–25, 2026
Odisha Police	1	3	2021–22
SAI-STC	1	0	2018–19
Radha Raman Club	1	0	2011
Odisha FC	1	0	2022–23
Sports Odisha	0	4	—
Chand Club	0	1	—

== See also ==
- Odisha women's football team
