= Odisha FC (women) =

Indian women's association football club based in Bhubaneswar, Odisha

Odisha Women
- Full name: Odisha Football Club Women
- Nicknames: The Kalinga Warriors; The Juggernauts
- Short name: OFCW
- Founded: 1 July 2022; 4 years ago
- Ground: Kalinga Stadium; Bhubaneswar, Odisha
- Capacity: 15,000
- Owner: GMS Inc.
- President: Vacant
- Head coach: Mitchel Ivan Silva
- League: Indian Women's League 2
- 2025–26: IWL 2, Group stage
- Website: odishafc.com
Home colours

Odisha Football Club Women ([oɽiˈsa]) is an Indian professional women's football club based in Bhubaneswar, Odisha, that competes in the Indian Women's League 2, the second tier of Indian women's football. Odisha FC Women were founded in 2022, when the Indian Super League side Odisha FC announced the formation of their women's side.

Odisha played their first-ever home match on 27 November 2022 at the Kalinga Stadium in Bhubaneswar, registering a 1–0 victory over East Coast Railway in the Odisha Women's League, the premier women's football competition in the state. Building on that strong start, the club went on to clinch the 2022–23 Odisha Women's League, securing the first silverware in their history and earning qualification to the Indian Women's League, the highest tier of women's professional football in India.

In a remarkable rise, Odisha lifted the 2023–24 Indian Women's League title in just their second season at the top level. The triumph also secured their maiden qualification to the inaugural 2024–25 AFC Women's Champions League, marking the club's historic debut on the continental stage.

== History ==
With an aim to have a professional women's team from Odisha, one of the major hotbeds of Indian women's football, Odisha FC club brought in an experienced football administrator, Randeep Baruah, as their Head of academy & Women's Football, to structure the women's football department. In 2022, on the holy occasion of Ratha Yatra, the Indian Super League (ISL) club Odisha FC announced the launch of their senior women's team. On the same day, the club announced the appointment of AFC A-Licensed coach and former player, Crispin Chettri, as team's first Head Coach.

Odisha FC Women kicked-off their professional football journey with participating in the 2022–23 Odisha Women's League, the top division women's football league of Odisha. Odisha played their first ever match on 27 November 2022, with a 1–0 win against East Coast Railway at the Kalinga Stadium in Bhubaneswar. The club went on to win their first regional siverware with winning the Odisha Women's League title with a perfect record of with 10 wins from 10 games, to qualify for the 2022–23 Indian Women's League. Pyari Xaxa ended up as the top scorer for the side with 11 goals in 10 games.

In the 2022–23 Indian Women's League season, Odisha finished third in the group stage of the competition, qualifying for the knockout stage with a total of 16 points with 5 wins, 1 draw, and 1 loss. Odisha faced defending champions Gokulam Kerala in the quarter-finals, which ended up 1–1 at the end of regular time, however, Odisha lost 0–3 on penalties, bowing out of the league. Despite ending up on the losing side in the quarter-final, Odisha directly qualified for the 2023–24 Indian Women's League season, as direct qualification was awarded to teams which qualified for the knockout round and finished in the top eight positions in the 2022–23 season.

In their second season in top-flight football since inception, Odisha won their first-ever national division silverware by winning the 2023–24 Indian Women's League title. Odisha ended up with 31 points from 12 games, qualifying for the 2024–25 AFC Women's Champions League, Asia's premier club women's football tournament organized by the Asian Football Confederation (AFC). Pyari Xaxa ended up as the top scorer for Odisha with 8 goals, followed by Win Theingi Tun with 7 goals to her name. Later in FIFA also congratulated the Odisha FC Women side for their outstanding performance in the Indian Women's League, crowning them as the Champions of India.

In the 2024–25 Indian Women's League season, Odisha began as defending champions after winning the title in 2023–24, but endured a difficult campaign marked by inconsistent form and a long winless run. Odisha ended up with 12 points from 14 games, ultimately finishing in 7th in the league resulting in relegation from the top flight, a rare fall for reigning champions in Indian women's club football. Lynda Kom ended up as the top scorer for Odisha with 7 goals to her name.

== Club crest and kits ==
=== Crest ===
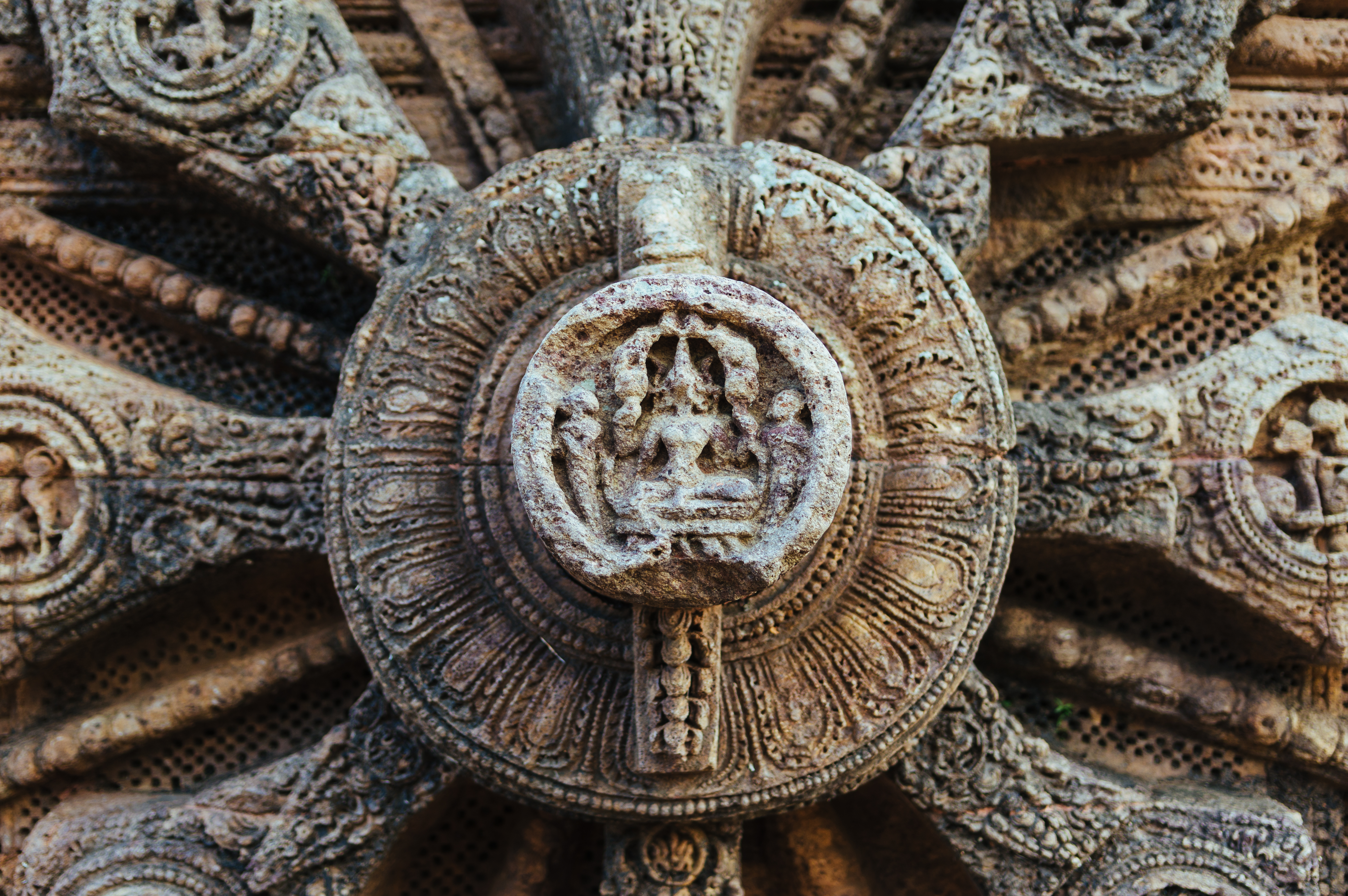
Center of a stone wheel engraved in the 13th-century-built Konark Sun Temple, a UNESCO World Heritage Site in Odisha, India.

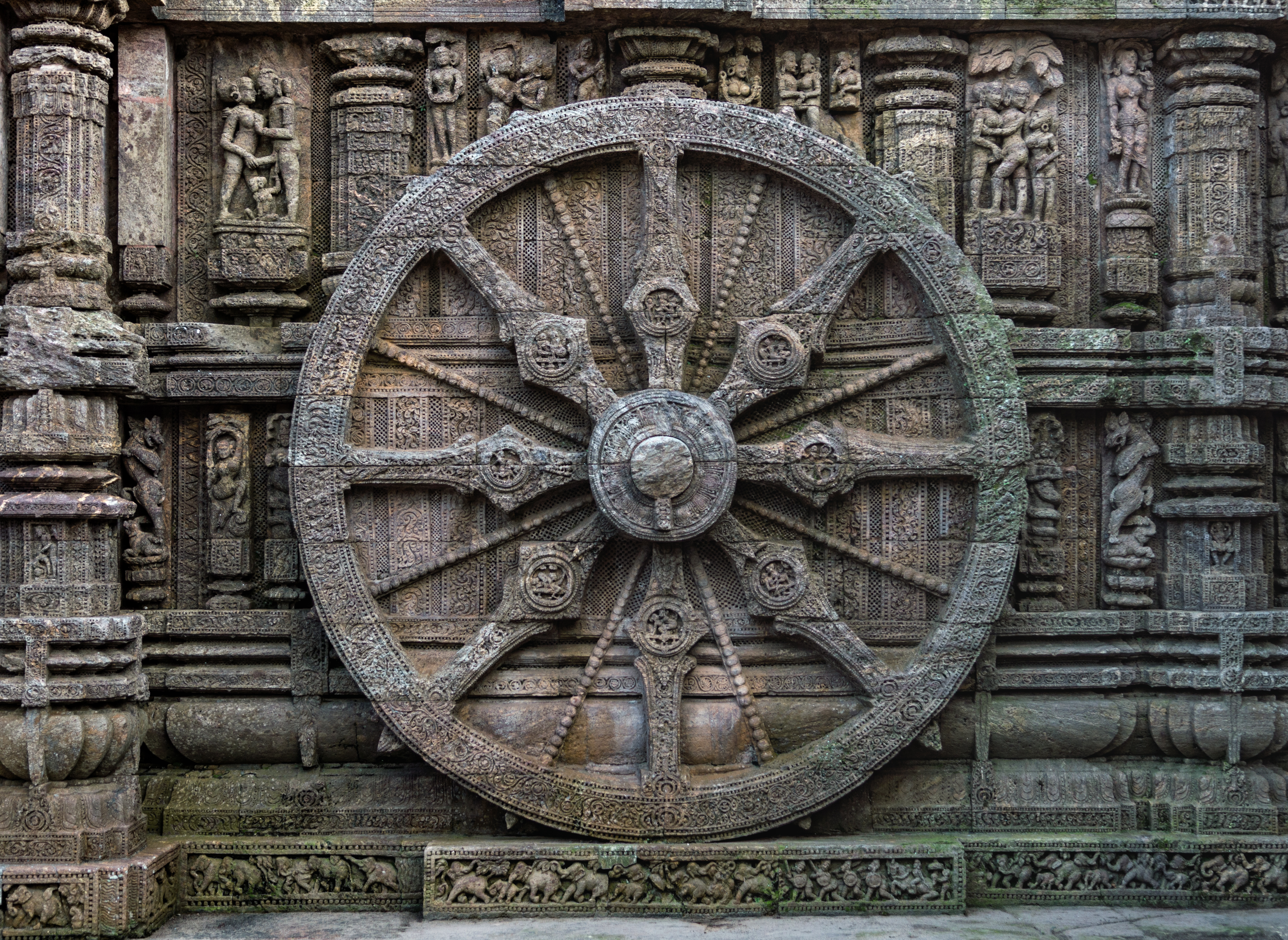
A stone wheel engraved in the walls of the temple which is designed as a chariot consisting of 24 such wheels.

On 15 September 2019, Odisha unveiled their official logo embodying the heritage and the culture of the state of Odisha and the vision and the ideology of its parent company, GMS Inc. The design for the crest is inspired from the Chakras or the chariot wheels of the famous Konark Sun Temple, a World Heritage Site in Odisha which represents movement and development; the ship design represents GMS, the world's largest buyer of ships and offshore assets, and the owner of the club.

=== Kit manufacturers and shirt sponsors ===
Period	Kit manufacturer	Shirt sponsor	Sleeve sponsor
2022–23	Trak-Only	Odisha Tourism	Serajuddin & Co.
2023–24	Trak-Only	Odisha Tourism	Serajuddin & Co.
2024–25	Trak-Only	Odisha Tourism	iServeU
2025–26	–	Odisha Tourism	Leela Worldwide; Lila Worldwide

=== Kit evolution ===
2022−23	2023−24	2024−25	2025−26

== Stadium ==
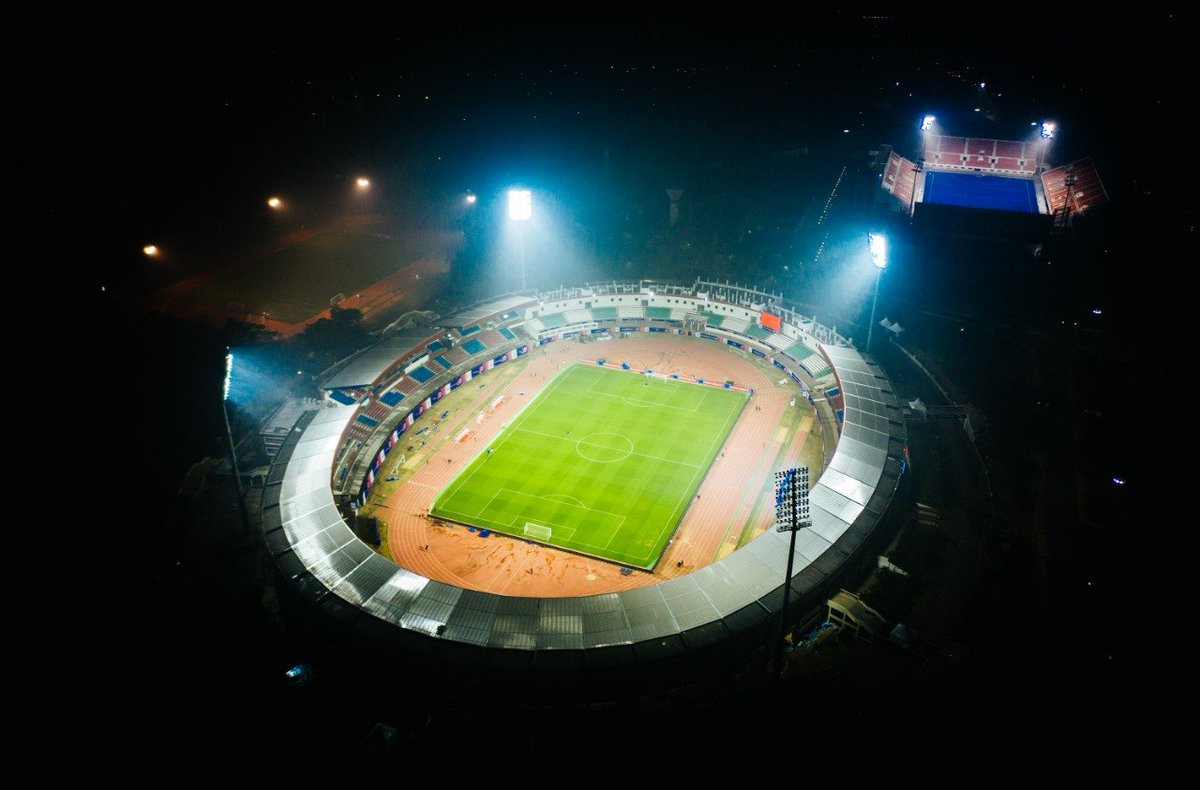
An elevated view of the Kalinga Stadium in 2019

Established in 1978, the Kalinga Stadium in Bhubaneswar, is the home ground of Odisha. The 12,000-capacity stadium has hosted several national and international tournaments including the Indian Super League, I-League, Super Cup, and 2019 Gold Cup. It was one of the venues to host the 2022 FIFA U-17 Women's World Cup. The stadium also serves as the home base for the India women's national football team and youth national teams.

== Support ==
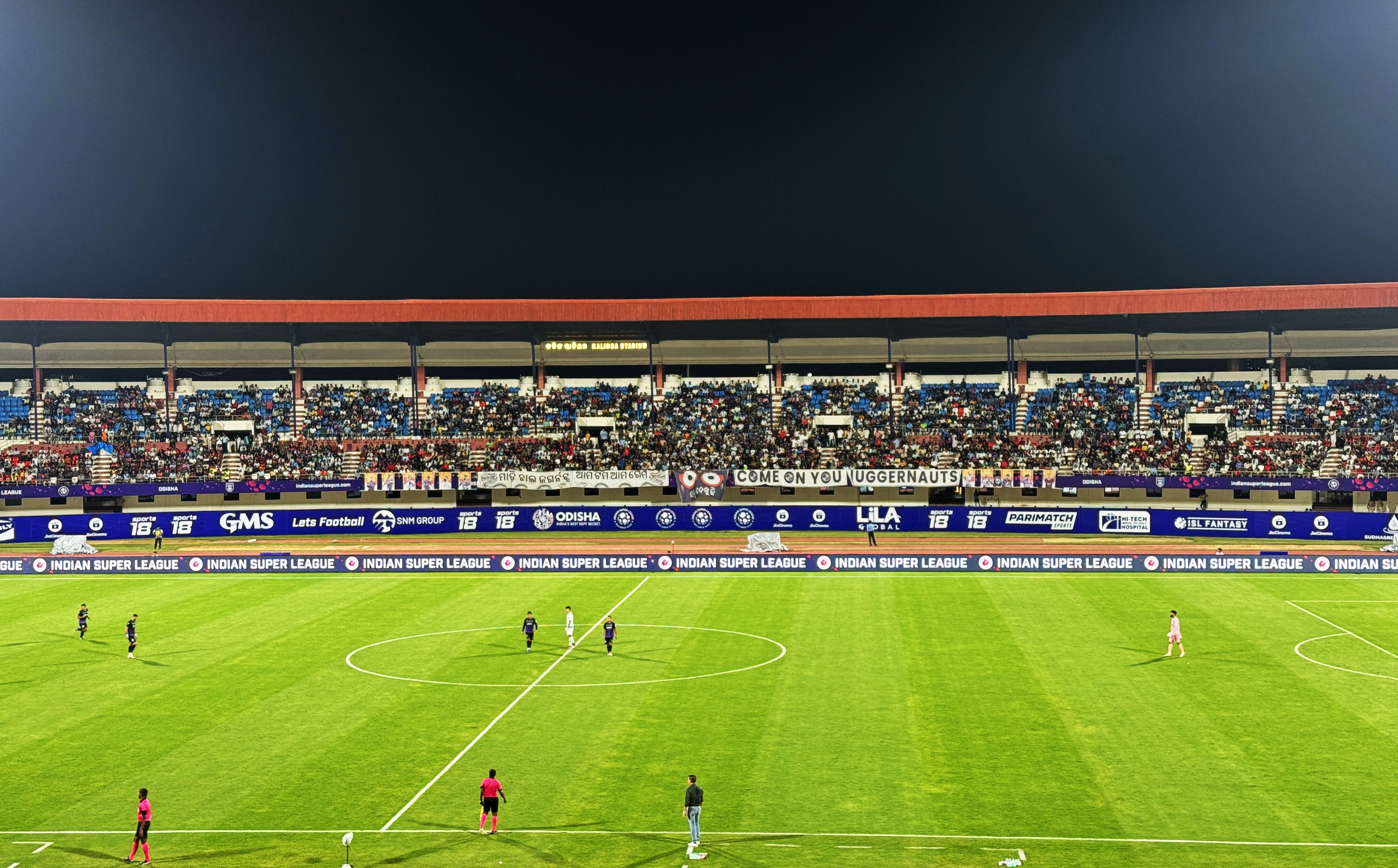
The Juggernauts in full voice at the Kalinga Stadium.

Odisha FC had immediately grown its popularity post its inception which resulted in the formation of its supporters group, known as The Juggernauts. The name of the group is derived from Jagannātha i.e. the "world-lord", combining jagata ("world") and natha ("lord"). Juggernaut is defined as a large powerful force or organization that cannot be stopped. After the club entered into a 3-year technical affiliation with the Premier League side Watford, the Juggernauts became the first Indian football supporters' group to get into an international alliance with supporters' group of a foreign club on September 3. They partnered with Watford's largest supporters' group, i.e. The 1881 Movement, for a cross-cultural fan exchange programme.

== Squad ==
As of 20 March 2026

Note: Flags indicate national team as defined under FIFA eligibility rules; some limited exceptions apply. Players may hold more than one non-FIFA nationality.

No.	Pos.	Nation	Player
1	GK	IND	Manassvi Rani
2	DF	IND	Kajal
3	DF	IND	Sadhika Shyam
5	MF	IND	Harleen Kaur Sokhi
6	MF	IND	Kanchan Rawat
7	FW	IND	Muskan Khan
8	MF	IND	Megan Leah Gamage
9	MF	IND	Irom Priyadashini Devi
10	MF	IND	Muriel Adam (captain)
11	FW	IND	Isabel D'Souza
12	MF	IND	Nim Lhamu Tamang

No.	Pos.	Nation	Player
13	DF	IND	Ashwathi P.
14	MF	IND	Monisha D.
15	DF	IND	Annu Gupta
16	MF	IND	Aanshi Khanna
17	FW	IND	Fatima Yar Mohammed Khan
21	FW	IND	Aysha Sartape
22	DF	IND	Rakhee Sawant
23	MF	IND	Anuska Rai
25	GK	IND	Aarti Banwari
31	GK	IND	Sunita Chettri
75	DF	IND	Vijayajeyanthi

== Records and statistics ==
As of 28 March 2026

Overall records
Season	League									OWL	AWCL	Top Scorer	
Season	Tier	P	W	D	L	GF	GA	Pts	Position	OWL	AWCL	Player	Goals
2022–23	1	7	5	1	1	28	2	16	Quarter-finalists	Champions	–	(India) Pyari Xaxa	11
2023–24	1	12	10	1	1	31	4	31	Champions	–	–	(India) Pyari Xaxa	8
2024–25	1	14	3	3	8	16	25	12	7th	–	Group Stage	(India) Lynda Kom	9
2025–26	2	4	0	1	3	1	6	1	Group Stage	–	–	(India) Aswathi P.	1

== Personnel ==
=== Current technical staff ===
Position	Name
Head coach	(India) Mitchel Ivan Silva
Assistant coach	Vacant
Goalkeeping coach	Vacant
Team Manager	(India) Cedric Williams
Team Physio	Vacant

=== Managerial history ===
Name	Nationality	Period	Ref.
Crispin Chettri	India	2022–2025	
Mitchel Ivan Silva	India	2026–	

=== Football Sport Management ===
Position	Name	Ref.
Technical Assistant	(India) Joy Gabriel	

== Management ==
Position	Name	Refs.
Club Owner & Advisor	(United States) Rohan Sharma	
Club President & CEO	(India) Ashish Shah	
General Manager	(India) Ravi Khedar	
Head of Finance	(India) Ajit Panda	
Senior Manager - Club Operations	(India) Bishes Panda	
Commercial Manager	(India) Ashis Hota	
Technical Assistant	(India) Joy Gabriel	
Senior Club Photographer	(India) Prateek Pattanayak	

== Honours ==
=== Domestic ===
- Indian Women's League
  - Winners (1): 2023–24

=== Regional ===
- Odisha Women's League
  - Winners (1): 2022–23

=== Recognitions ===
- IWL Roll of Honours
  - Best Media Operations (1): 2023–24

== Performance in Asian competitions ==
Season	Competition	Round	Club	Result	Position	Top scorer(s)	Goals
2024–25	AWCL	Preliminary Stage	(Singapore) Lion City Sailors	4–1	Group B Winners	(Ghana) Jennifer Kankam Yeboah	3
2024–25	AWCL	Preliminary Stage	(Jordan) Etihad Club	2–1	Group B Winners	(Ghana) Jennifer Kankam Yeboah	3
2024–25	AWCL	Group Stage	(Japan) Urawa Red Diamonds	0–17	Group C	(Ghana) Jennifer Kankam Yeboah	3
2024–25	AWCL	Group Stage	(Vietnam) Hồ Chí Minh City	1–3	Group C	(Ghana) Jennifer Kankam Yeboah	3
2024–25	AWCL	Group Stage	(Chinese Taipei) Taichung Blue Whale	0–4	Group C	(Ghana) Jennifer Kankam Yeboah	3

== Affiliated clubs ==
The following clubs are affiliated with Odisha FC:

- (England) Watford FC (2021–present)
- (Brazil) Avai FC (2021–present)

== See also ==
- Odisha FC
- Odisha women's football team
- Odisha football team
- Odisha Women's League
- Football Association of Odisha
