= KIIT Group of Institutions =

Private institutions in Odisha, India

KIIT Group of Institutions is a private university in Bhubaneswar, Odisha, India. It includes KIIT University, Kalinga Institute of Medical Sciences, Kalinga Institute of Dental Sciences, Kalinga Institute of Social Sciences and other institutes.

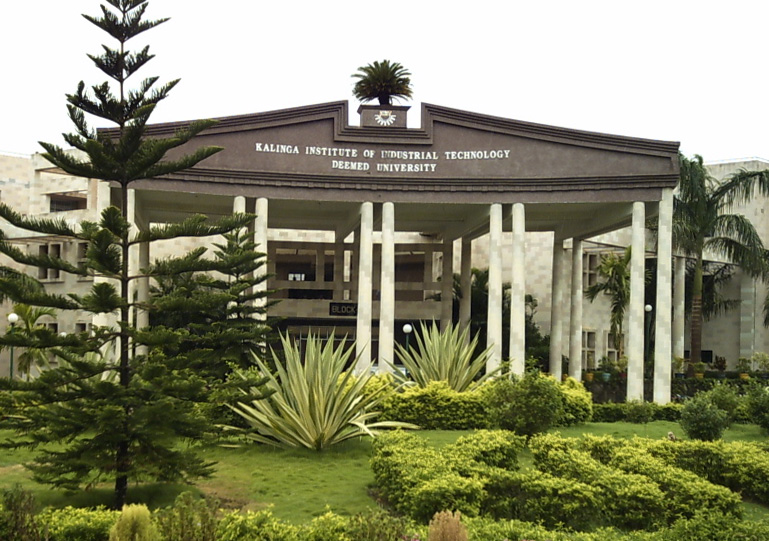
KIIT Deemed to be University

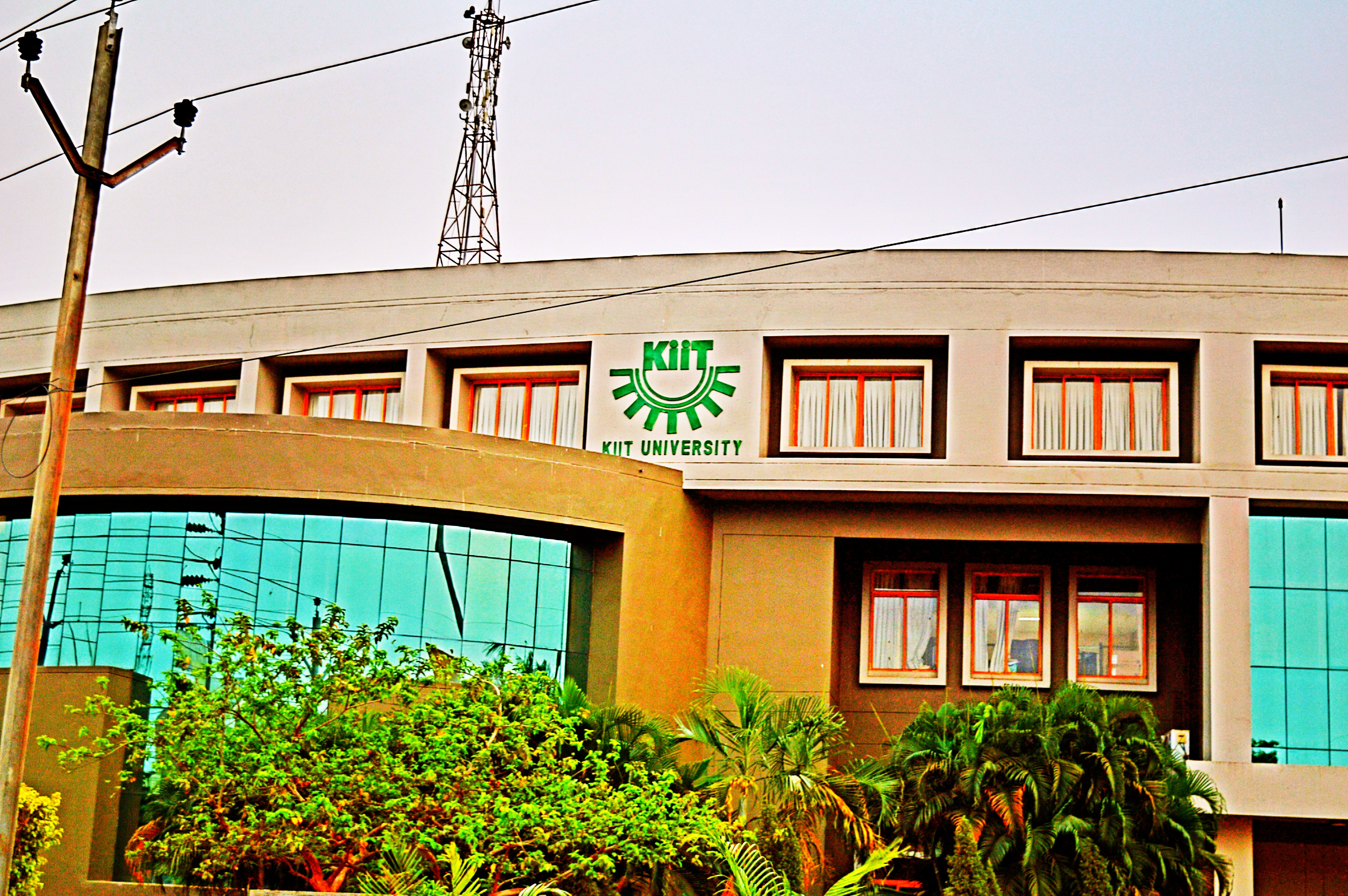
KIIT Central Library

== Programmes under KIIT University ==
- B Tech and M Tech: offered from KIIT School of Technology separate school for every department
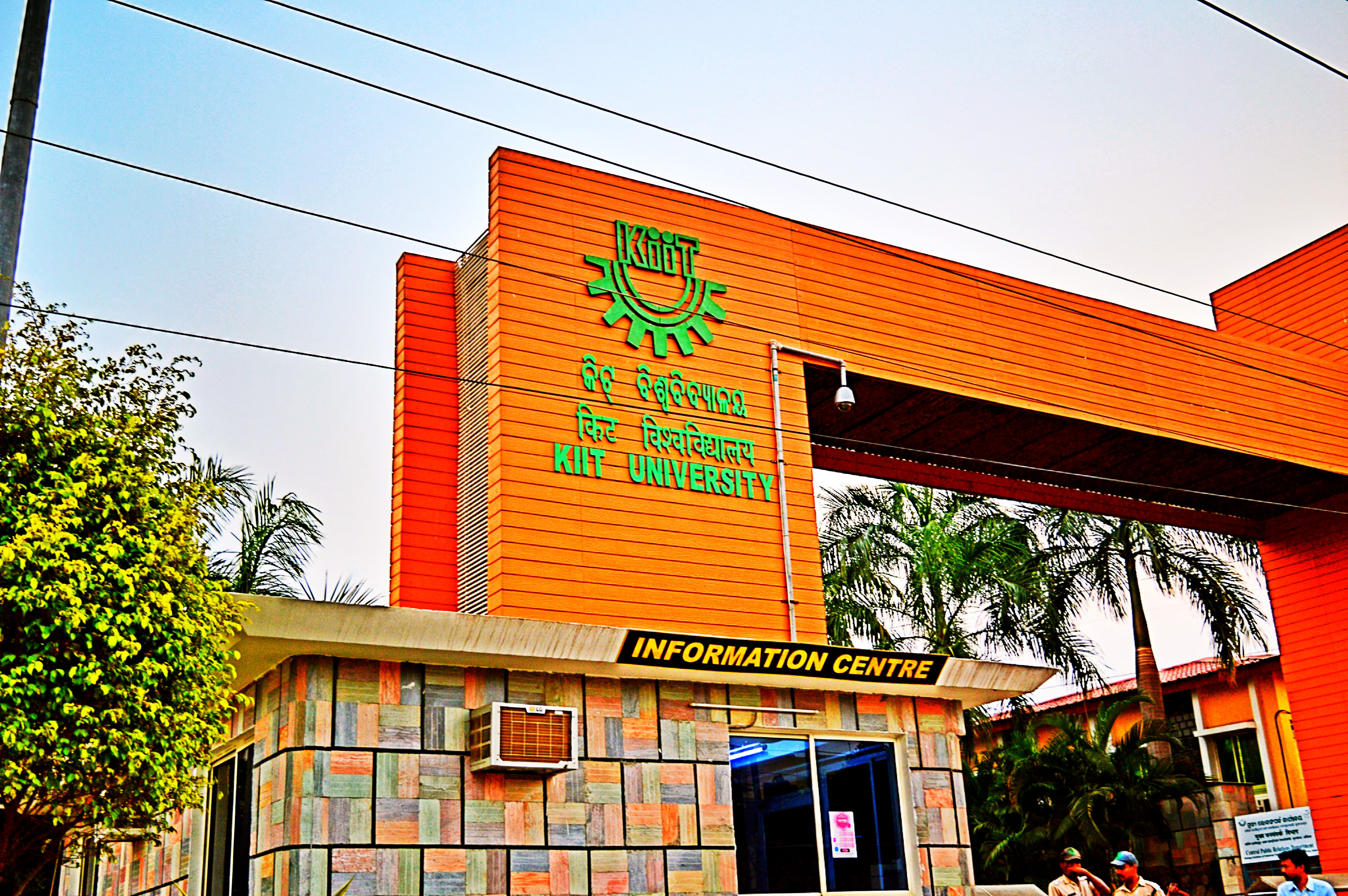
  KIIT Campus 6 Gate
- Master in Computer Application (MCA)established in 1997, BCA established in 2007: offered from KIIT School of Computer Application
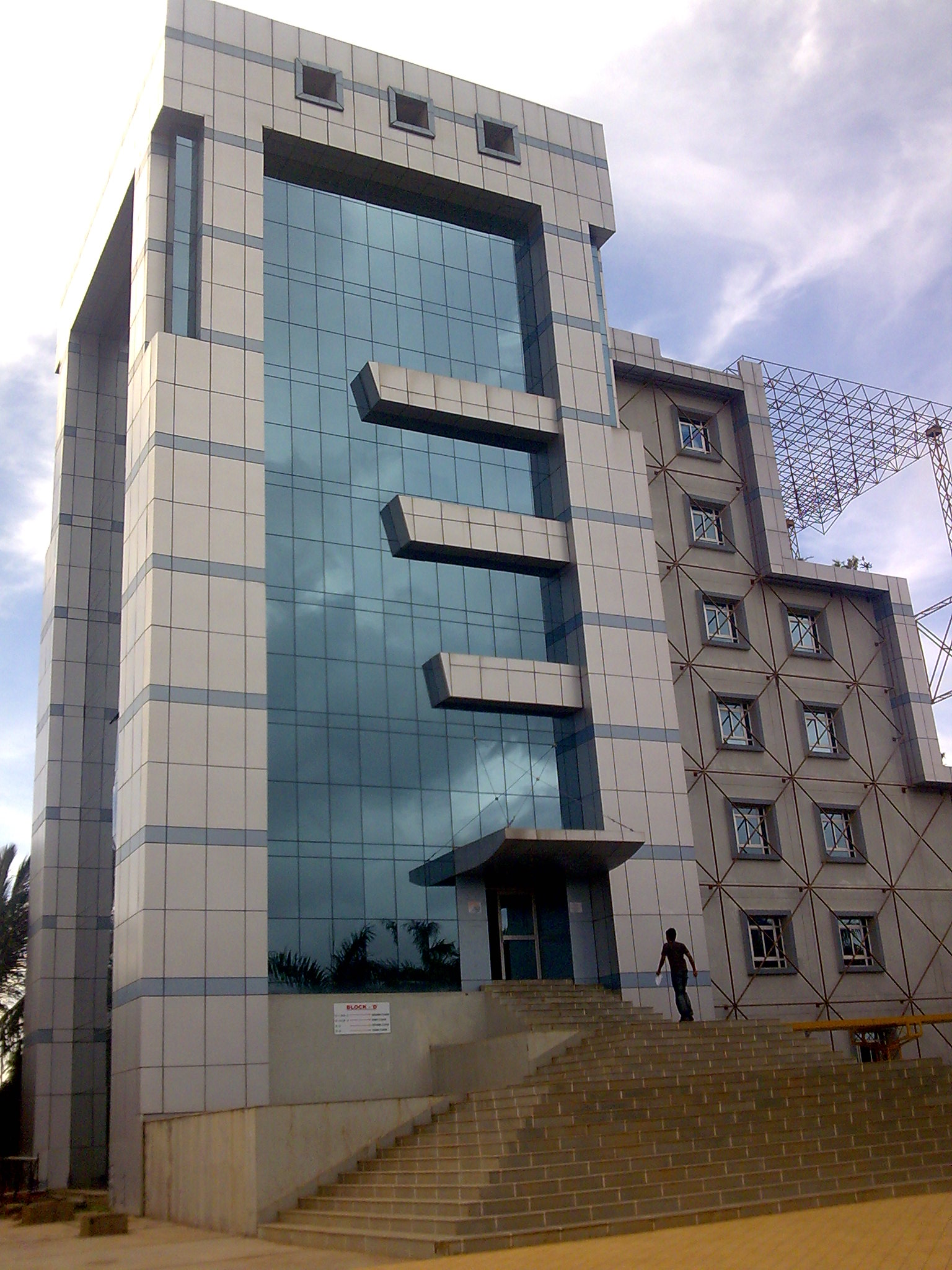
  KIIT School of Computer Application
- MBA and MBA (BIM), BBA: Offered from KIIT School of Management, established in 1993
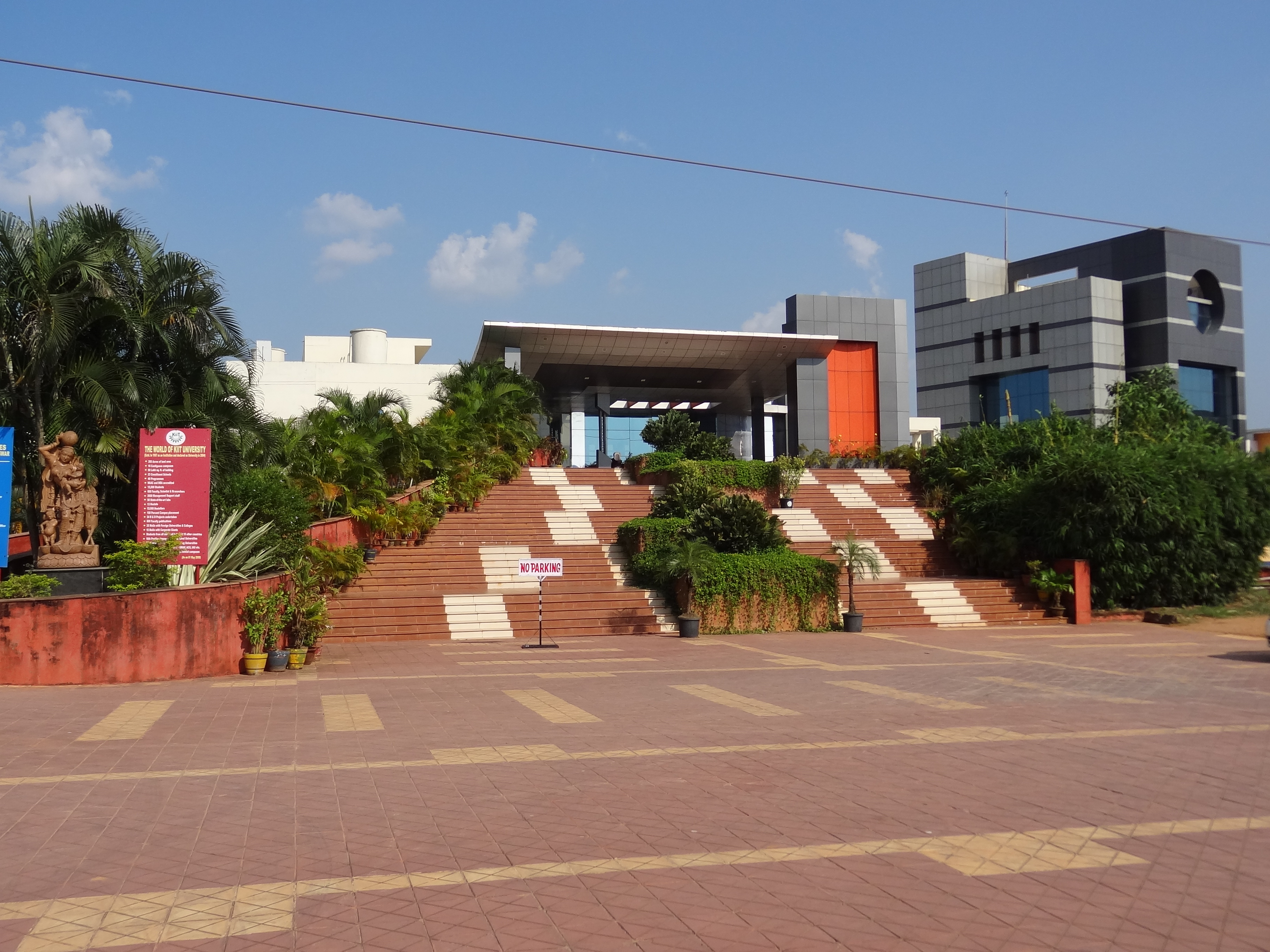
  KIIT School of Management campus
- MBA in Rural Management (MRM): Offered from KIIT School of Rural Management (KSRM), started in 2007
- B.Tech, M.Sc and PhD program in Biotechnology: Offered by KIIT School of Biotechnology (KSBT), starting from 2007
- BBA.LL.B, BA.LL.B, B.Sc.LL.B AND LL.M Offered by KIIT Law School (KLS), started in 2007
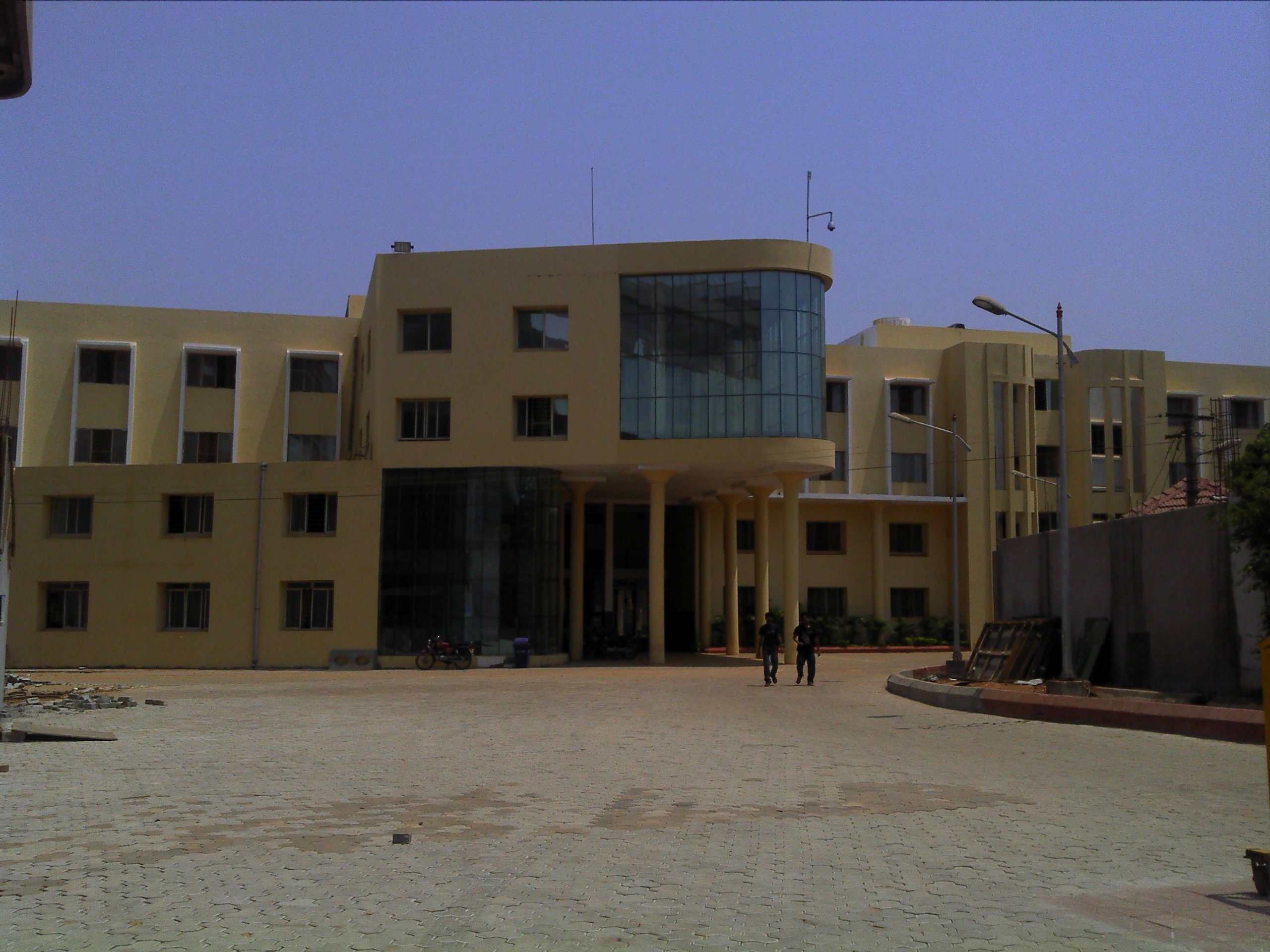
  KIIT Law school Boys' Hostel

- Master in Journalism & Mass Communication
- Bachelor of Fashion Design(B.Des)
- Bachelor of Fashion Technology (B.F.Tech)
- Master of Fashion Management
- PG Diploma Courses in Film & Television
- Bachelor of Architecture(B.Arch)

== Programmes under KIIT Society ==
- MBBS : Offered from Kalinga Institute of Medical Sciences, Kusabhadra Campus.(KIMS)
- BDS : Offered by Kalinga Institute of Dental Sciences (KIDS)
- Diploma Engineering : Offered from Kalinga Polytechnic, established in 1995
- Certificate Courses :Offered from KIIT Industrial Training Institute, established in 1992
- KIIT International School
- KIIT Science College: Pre-college education in science

== Kalinga Institute of Medical Sciences and Pradyumna Bal Memorial Hospital ==
Conceived to provide health care facilities to the deprived poor. The Medical College is divided into 20 academic departments: providing the study, treatment, and prevention of human diseases, and maternity care and consists of a 500 bedded hospital with an expansion program of a multi specialty hospital to be opened very shortly.

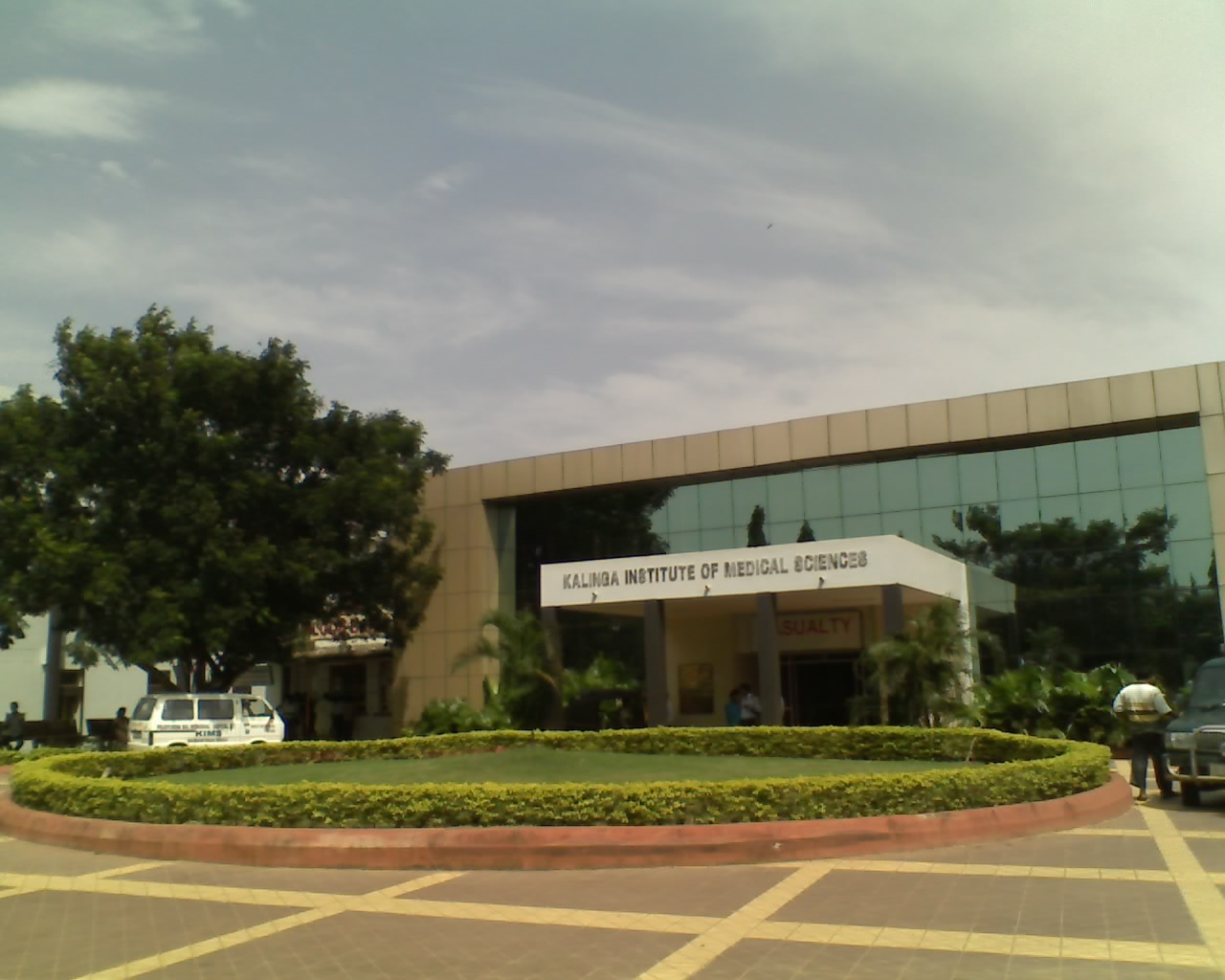
KIMS

== KIIT student activity center ==
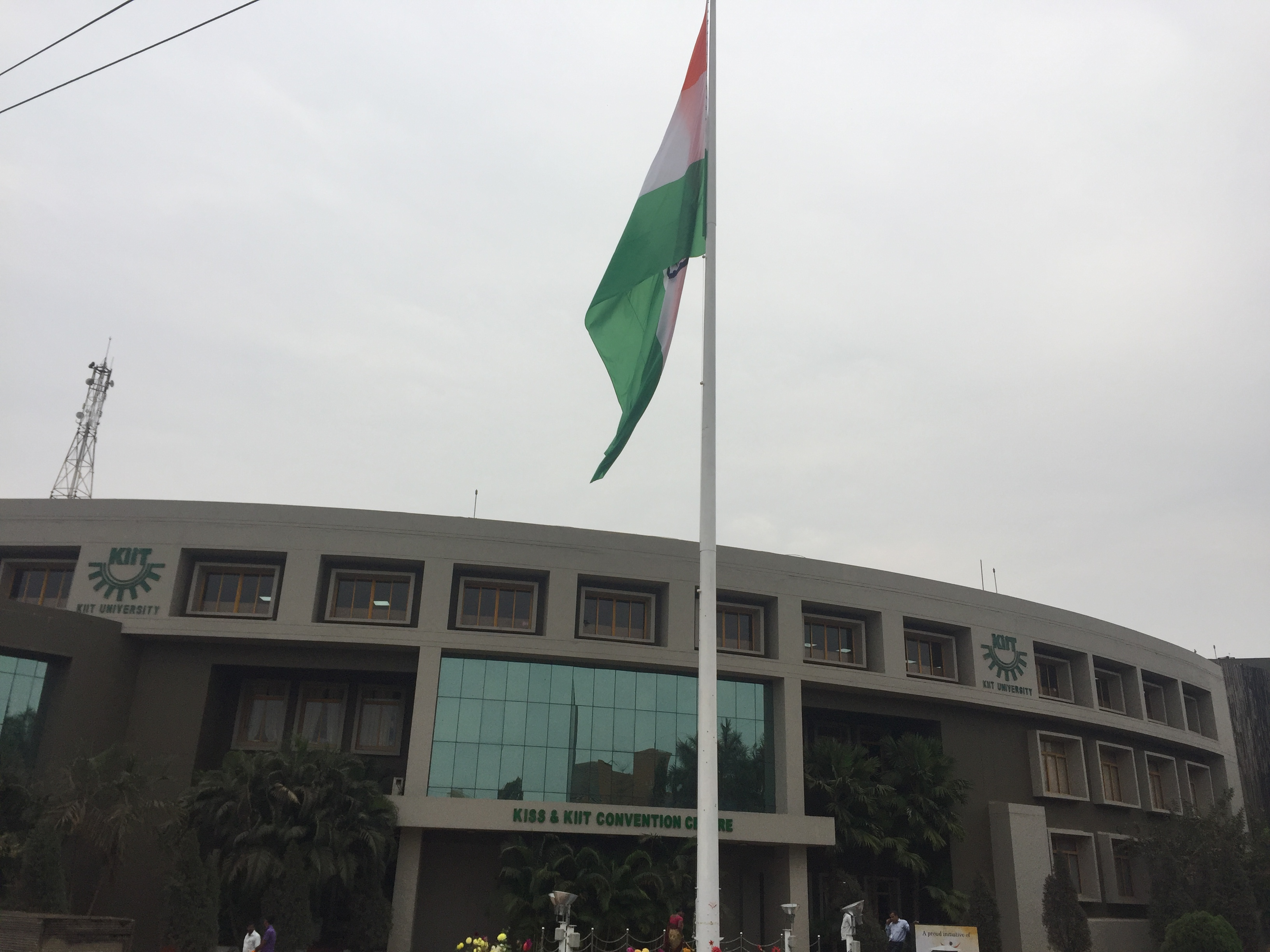
KIIT convention centre

- , campus 13,(ksac)
