= 2022 National Games of India =

Sports event

36th National Games of India
- Host city: Ahmedabad, Gandhinagar, Surat, Vadodara, Rajkot, and Bhavnagar
- Motto: Celebrating Unity Through Sports
- Teams: 37
- Athletes: 7000
- Events: 36
- Opening: 29 September 2022
- Closing: 12 October 2022
- Opened by: Narendra Modi (Prime Minister of India)
- Main venue: Narendra Modi Stadium, Motera, Ahmedabad

The 2022 National Games of India, also known as the 36th National Games of India and informally as Gujarat 2022, was the 36th edition of the National Games of India and was held in Ahmedabad, Gandhinagar, Surat, Vadodara, Rajkot and Bhavnagar in the state of Gujarat between 29 September and 12 October 2022.

== Participating teams ==
Teams are expected from all 28 states and eight union territories of India as well a team representing Indian Armed Forces. The new union territories of Ladakh and Dadra and Nagar Haveli and Daman and Diu made their National Games debut at these games.

- Andaman and Nicobar Islands
- Andhra Pradesh
- Arunachal Pradesh
- Assam
- Bihar
- Chandigarh
- Chhattisgarh
- Dadra and Nagar Haveli and Daman and Diu
- Delhi
- Goa
- Gujarat
- Haryana
- Himachal Pradesh
- Jammu and Kashmir
- Jharkhand
- Karnataka
- Kerala
- Ladakh
- Lakshadweep
- Madhya Pradesh
- Maharashtra
- Manipur
- Meghalaya
- Mizoram
- Nagaland
- Odisha
- Puducherry
- Punjab
- Rajasthan
- Services
- Sikkim
- Tamil Nadu
- Telangana
- Tripura
- Uttar Pradesh
- Uttarakhand
- West Bengal

== Marketing ==
The official logo and motto of the games was unveiled on 22 July 2022. The logo depicts an Asiatic lion head make up of sporting pictograms and the Statue of Unity. The official motto of the games is "Celebrating unity through sports". The games mascot is Savaj the asiatic lion.

The curtain raiser event was held on 4 September 2022 at EKA Arena.

== Venues ==
The games will be held across the cities of Ahmedabad, Gandhinagar, Surat, Vadodara, Rajkot and Bhavnagar. While Cycling-Track Events will be held in Indira Gandhi Cycling Velodrome, Delhi.

=== Ahmedabad ===
- Narendra Modi Stadium (Opening and closing ceremonies)
- Sanskar Dham (Archery, Indian Archery, Kho Kho, Mallakhambh)
- EKA Arena (Football, Kabaddi, Rugby7s, Yogasana)
- Sabarmati Riverfront (Canoeing, Roller Sports, Rowing, Soft Tennis, Tennis)
- Kensville Golf and Country Club (Golf, Lawn Bowls)
- Crown Shooting Academy (Shooting)
- Rifle Club (Shooting)
- Shahibaug Police Stadium (Football)

=== Gandhinagar ===
- IIT Gandhinagar (Athletics, Softball, Squash, Triathlon)
- Mahatma Mandir (Boxing, Fencing, Judo, Weightlifting, Wrestling, Wushu)

=== Surat ===
- Dumas Beach (Beach Sports)
- PDDU Indoor Stadium (Badminton, Table Tennis)

=== Vadodara ===
- Sama Sports Complex (Gymnastics)

=== Rajkot ===
- Sardar Patel Swimming Complex (Aquatics)
- Dhyanchand Hockey Ground (Hockey)

=== Bhavnagar ===
- Multipurpose Hall, SAG (Basketball, Netball, Volleyball)

=== New Delhi ===
- Indira Gandhi Cycling Velodrome (Track Cycling)

== Sports ==
The sports programme will include athletics, field hockey, football, volleyball, lawn tennis, table tennis, skateboarding, Netball and judo, and will also feature traditional sports such as kabaddi, kho kho, mallakhamba, and yogasana.

36th National Games of India
- Archery
- Athletics
- Badminton
- Basketball
  - 3x3 basketball
- Boxing
- Bowls
- Cycling
- Fencing
- Field hockey
- Football
- Golf
- Gymnastics
- Handball
- Judo
- Kabaddi
- Kho kho
- Mallakhamba
- Netball
- Roller skating
- Rowing
- Rugby sevens
- Shooting
- Skateboarding
- Softball
- Soft tennis
- Squash
- Swimming
- Taekwondo
- Table tennis
- Tennis
- Triathlon
- Volleyball
- Weightlifting
- Wrestling
- Wushu
- Yogasana

== Medal table ==
As of 12 October 2022

2022 National Games medal table
Rank	State	Gold	Silver	Bronze	Total
1	Services	61	35	32	128
2	Maharashtra	39	38	63	140
3	Haryana	38	38	40	116
4	Karnataka	27	23	38	88
5	Tamil Nadu	25	22	27	74
6	Kerala	23	18	13	54
7	Madhya Pradesh	20	25	21	66
8	Uttar Pradesh	20	18	18	56
9	Manipur	20	10	20	50
10	Punjab	19	32	25	76
11	Delhi	14	17	40	71
12	Gujarat*	13	15	21	49
13	West Bengal	13	14	17	44
14	Assam	9	10	9	28
15	Telangana	8	7	8	23
16	Arunachal Pradesh	6	1	0	7
17	Odisha	4	11	11	26
18	Jharkhand	3	5	5	13
19	Chandigarh	3	4	4	11
20	Rajasthan	3	3	24	30
21	Andhra Pradesh	2	9	5	16
22	Chhattisgarh	2	5	6	13
23	Andaman and Nicobar Islands	2	5	5	12
24	Himachal Pradesh	2	4	3	9
25	Tripura	2	0	1	3
26	Uttarakhand	1	8	9	18
27	Jammu and Kashmir	1	2	9	12
28	Mizoram	1	1	2	4
28	Puducherry	1	1	2	4
30	Goa	0	0	5	5
31	Bihar	0	0	2	2
32	Sikkim	0	0	1	1
33	Dadra and Nagar Haveli and Daman and Diu	0	0	0	0
33	Ladakh	0	0	0	0
33	Lakshadweep	0	0	0	0
33	Meghalaya	0	0	0	0
33	Nagaland	0	0	0	0
Totals (37 entries)		382	381	486	1,249

== See also ==
- Khelo India Youth Games
- 2015 National Games of India
- Khelo India University Games

Preceded by 2020 National Games of India	National Games of India	Succeeded by 2023 National Games of India
