= 2023 FAO Super Cup =

2023 Super Cup
FAO Super Cup

Tournament details
- Country: India
- Venue(s): Barabati Stadium (Cuttack)
- Dates: 24–29 August 2023
- Teams: 8

Final positions
- Champions: Sports Odisha (1st title)

Tournament statistics
- Matches played: 7
- Goals scored: 23 (3.29 per match)
- Top goal scorer(s): Dinabandhu Das (Young Utkal Club) (4 goals)
- All statistics correct as of 25 August 2023.

The 2023 FAO Super Cup was the third edition of the FAO Super Cup, the main club knockout football competition of Odisha, India. The competition ran from 17 to 23 August 2023. The entire tournament took place at one venue i.e. the Barabati Stadium in Cuttack. Sports Odisha became the champions.

The competition features teams from the Diamond, Gold, and Silver competitions of the FAO League, the premier state level football league in Odisha, India. The top four teams from the Diamond League, top three from Silver League, and the winners of the Silver League qualify for the tournament.

== Teams ==
A total of 8 teams will participate in the competition. From FAO League, the top four teams from the Diamond Division, three from the Gold Division, and the winner of Silver Division play-off will qualify for the tournament.

Team	Qualifying method	App. (last)
Sunrise Club	2023 FAO Diamond League champions	3rd (2022)
Sports Odisha	2023 FAO Diamond League runners-up	3rd (2022)
Radha Raman Club	2023 FAO Diamond League third place	2nd (2022)
Young Utkal Club	2023 FAO Diamond League fourth place	2nd (2022)
Rising Star Club	2023 FAO Gold League champions	3rd (2022)
Kishore Club	2023 FAO Gold League runners-up	2nd (2022)
Jay Durga Club	2023 FAO Gold League third place	2nd (2022)
Independent Club	2023 FAO Silver League champions	1st

=== Dates ===
Phase	Round	Dates
Main Tournament	Quarter-finals	24–25 August 2023
Main Tournament	Semi-finals	27 August 2023
Main Tournament	Final	29 August 2023

== Bracket ==
Quarter-finals
24 August – Cuttack
Radha Raman Club	3
Kishore Club	0
25 August – Cuttack
Sunrise Club	1
Independent Club	0
24 August – Cuttack
Sports Odisha	3
Jay Durga Club	1
25 August – Cuttack
Young Utkal Club	5 (2)
Rising Star Club (p)	5 (4)

Semi-finals
27 August – Cuttack
Radha Raman Club	1 (4)
Sunrise Club (p)	1 (5)
27 August – Cuttack
Sports Odisha (p)	1 (4)
Rising Star Club	1 (3)

Final
29 August – Cuttack
Sunrise Club	0
Sports Odisha	1

== Quarter-finals ==
24 August 2023
16:00

Radha Raman Club	3–0	Kishore Club
Tophan Nayak 30'; Binay Kisan 45+1'; Biki Sethi 89'	Report

Barabati Stadium, Cuttack
Referee: Rabin Biswas

24 August 2023
18:30

Sports Odisha	3–1	Jay Durga Club
Pintu Samal 45+2' (pen.); Jagannath Tudu 66', 89'	Report	Sk. Nawazish Noor 67' (pen.)

Barabati Stadium, Cuttack
Referee: Bimalendu Mondal

25 August 2023
16:00

Sunrise Club	1–0	Independent Club
Finto 75'	Report

Barabati Stadium, Cuttack

25 August 2023
18:30

Young Utkal Club	5–5	Rising Star Club
Dinabandhu Das 45+3', 48' (pen.), 68' (pen.), 88' (pen.); Bijay Kumar Barik 82'	Report	Hari Kathayat 2'; Bikash Chandra Padhihary 19', 75'; Jitu Muduli 41'; Madhu Jani 58'
Penalties
Bikash Kumar Sahoo (penalty scored); Babul Kumar Rout (penalty scored)	2–4	(penalty scored) Bijay Singh; (penalty scored) Abhinash Muduli; (penalty scored) Jitu Muduli; (penalty scored) Madhu Jani

Barabati Stadium, Cuttack

== Semi-finals ==
27 August 2023
16:00

Radha Raman Club	1–1	Sunrise Club
Spirav Ranjam Hanuman 90' (pen.)	Report	Selwyn Frazier Miranda 39'
Penalties
Chandrakanta Das (penalty scored); Binay Kisan (penalty scored); Gaurav Negi (penalty scored); Tophan Nayak (penalty scored)	4–5	(penalty scored) Jamir Oram; (penalty scored) Selwyn Frazier Miranda; (penalty scored) Finto; (penalty scored) Ashanta Kerketta; (penalty scored) Sanjib Oram

Barabati Stadium, Cuttack

27 August 2023
18:30

Sports Odisha	1–1	Rising Star Club
Raisen Tudu 82'	Report	Abhinash Muduli 49'
Penalties
Pintu Samal (penalty scored); D Sanjay (penalty scored); Prasanta Srihari (penalty scored); Suraj Naik (penalty scored)	4–3	(penalty scored) Bikash Chandra Padhihary; (penalty scored) Abhinash Muduli; (penalty scored) Madhu Jani

Barabati Stadium, Cuttack

== Final ==
29 August 2023
17:00

Sunrise Club	0–1	Sports Odisha
	Report	Jagannath Tudu 78'

Barabati Stadium, Cuttack

== See also ==
- 2023 FAO League
- 2022 FAO Super Cup
- FAO League
- FAO Super Cup
- Odisha Women's League
- Odisha football team
- Odisha women's football team
- Football Association of Odisha
