= 2022–23 Indian State Leagues =

2022–23 season in state football leagues of India

State leagues in India
- Season: 2022–23

The 2022–23 Indian State leagues season represented the fifth tier of the Indian football league system, a series of state-level football tournaments played as qualifiers to determine teams for the 2023–24 I-League 3.

== Overview ==
| Zone | State | League | Total teams | Champions | Runners-up | I-League 3 qualification |
|---|---|---|---|---|---|---|
| North | Delhi | Delhi Premier League | 10 | Vatika | Delhi | Vatika FC; Garhwal |
| North | Punjab | Punjab State Super Football League | 11 | RoundGlass Punjab | Punjab Police | International FC; Doaba United |
North-East
| North-East | Manipur | Manipur State League | 17 | KLASA | Rising Athletic Union | KLASA; KIYC |
| North-East | Meghalaya | Meghalaya State League | 25 | Rangdajied | Khliehmawlieh YC | Rangdajied |
| North-East | Mizoram | Mizoram Premier League | 8 | Chawnpui FC | FC Venghnuai | - |
| North-East | Tripura | Chandra Memorial League | N/A | Forward Club Agartala | N/A | - |
East
| East | Jharkhand (Jamshedpur) | JSA League Premier Division | 11 | Jamshedpur B | Tata Steel | - |
| East | Odisha | FAO League | 8 | Sunrise Club | Radha Raman Club | Sports Odisha |
| East | Sikkim | Sikkim Premier Division League | 8 | Sikkim Police FC | Sikkim Himalayan | - |
| East | West Bengal (Kolkata) | Calcutta Premier Division | 14 | Mohammedan | Bhawanipore | Bhawanipore; Diamond Harbour |
| East | Chhattisgarh | Chhattisgarh State Men's Football League | 9 | RKM FA | New Friends Dantewada | RKM FA; New Friends Dantewada |
| West | Goa | Goa Professional League | 11 | Dempo | Sporting Goa | Dempo; Sporting Goa |
| West | Gujarat | Gujarat SFA Club Championship | 17 | Baroda FA | ARA | Baroda FA; ARA |
| West | Madhya Pradesh | Madhya Pradesh Premier League | 8 | Lake City | Diamond Rock FA | Lake City |
| West | Maharashtra (Mumbai) | MFA Elite Division | 16 | Ambernath United Atlanta | Karnatak SA | Millat |
| West | Rajasthan | Rajasthan State Men's League | 9 | Jaipur Elite | Jaipur United | Jaipur Elite |
| South | Karnataka (Bengaluru) | Bangalore Super Division | 20 | SC Bengaluru | FC Bengaluru United | SC Bengaluru; Kickstart |
| South | Kerala | Kerala Premier League | 22 | Kerala United | Gokulam Kerala B | Kerala United |

== State leagues and standings ==
=== Chhattisgarh ===
| Pos | Team | Pld | W | D | L | GF | GA | GD | Pts | Qualification or relegation |
|---|---|---|---|---|---|---|---|---|---|---|
| 1 | RKM Football Academy | 16 | 13 | 3 | 0 | 63 | 4 | +59 | 42 | Champions and eligible for 2023-24 I-League 3 |
| 2 | New Friends Dantewada | 16 | 10 | 3 | 3 | 30 | 14 | +16 | 33 | Possible qualification for 2023-24 I-League 3 |
| 3 | Youth Boys | 16 | 9 | 4 | 3 | 28 | 13 | +15 | 31 | |
| 4 | Rajhara Mines | 16 | 8 | 4 | 4 | 32 | 16 | +16 | 28 | |
| 5 | North East Institute | 16 | 7 | 5 | 4 | 22 | 16 | +6 | 26 | |
| 6 | Brahmavid FA | 16 | 3 | 4 | 9 | 7 | 29 | −22 | 13 | |
| 7 | Shera FA | 16 | 3 | 3 | 10 | 12 | 32 | −20 | 12 | |
| 8 | Mahamaya | 16 | 3 | 2 | 11 | 12 | 52 | −40 | 11 | |
| 9 | ATK Champion | 16 | 1 | 2 | 13 | 11 | 41 | −30 | 5 | |

Source: The Away End
Rules for classification: 1) points; 2) goal difference; 3) number of goals scored

=== Delhi ===
| Pos | Team | Pld | W | D | L | GF | GA | GD | Pts | Qualification |
|---|---|---|---|---|---|---|---|---|---|---|
| 1 | Vatika FC | 20 | 14 | 2 | 4 | 39 | 16 | +23 | 44 | Champions and qualification for 2023–24 I-League 3 |
| 2 | Delhi | 20 | 12 | 3 | 5 | 47 | 26 | +21 | 39 | Qualification for 2023–24 I-League 3 |
| 3 | Sudeva Delhi | 20 | 11 | 4 | 5 | 38 | 24 | +14 | 37 | |
| 4 | Garhwal | 20 | 10 | 6 | 4 | 39 | 23 | +16 | 36 | |
| 5 | Royal Rangers FC | 20 | 9 | 5 | 6 | 50 | 32 | +18 | 32 | |
| 6 | Indian Air Force FC | 20 | 10 | 1 | 9 | 32 | 31 | +1 | 31 | |
| 7 | Rangers SC | 20 | 7 | 5 | 8 | 40 | 46 | −6 | 26 | |
| 8 | Friends United FC | 20 | 6 | 5 | 9 | 44 | 39 | +5 | 23 | |
| 9 | Tarun Sangha | 20 | 5 | 4 | 11 | 30 | 49 | −19 | 19 | |
| 10 | Hindustan | 20 | 3 | 5 | 12 | 21 | 41 | −20 | 14 | |
| 11 | Uttarakhand FC | 20 | 3 | 0 | 17 | 18 | 71 | −53 | 9 | |

Source: The Away End
Rules for classification: 1) points; 2) head-to-head points; 3) head-to-head goal difference; 4) head-to-head goals scored; 5) goal difference; 6) number of goals scored; 7) fair play ranking; 8) drawing of lots

=== Goa ===
| Pos | Team | Pld | W | D | L | GF | GA | GD | Pts | Qualification |
|---|---|---|---|---|---|---|---|---|---|---|
| 1 | Dempo | 15 | 9 | 3 | 3 | 25 | 15 | +10 | 30 | Champions and qualification for 2023–24 I-League 3 |
| 2 | Sporting Goa | 15 | 9 | 2 | 4 | 26 | 15 | +11 | 29 | Qualification for 2023–24 I-League 3 |
| 3 | Salgaocar | 15 | 8 | 4 | 3 | 23 | 14 | +9 | 28 | |
| 4 | FC Goa B | 15 | 4 | 10 | 1 | 17 | 11 | +6 | 22 | |
| 5 | Churchill Brothers | 15 | 5 | 6 | 4 | 23 | 17 | +6 | 21 | |
| 6 | Calangute Association | 15 | 5 | 5 | 5 | 18 | 14 | +4 | 20 | |

Source: Goa Pro League - The Away End
Rules for classification: 1) points; 2) goal difference; 3) number of goals scored

=== Gujarat ===
| Pos | Team | Pld | W | D | L | GF | GA | GD | Pts | Qualification |
|---|---|---|---|---|---|---|---|---|---|---|
| 1 | Baroda FA (C) | 13 | 12 | 0 | 1 | 46 | 8 | +38 | 36 | Champions and possible qualification for 2023–24 I-League 2 |
| 2 | ARA | 12 | 6 | 2 | 4 | 34 | 10 | +24 | 20 | Possible qualification for 2023–24 I-League 2 |
| 3 | Suryavanshi FC | 13 | 6 | 2 | 5 | 20 | 28 | −8 | 20 | |
| 4 | RBI | 12 | 5 | 3 | 4 | 43 | 19 | +24 | 18 | |
| 5 | CVM FC | 12 | 5 | 2 | 5 | 21 | 19 | +2 | 17 | |
| 6 | SAG FA | 12 | 4 | 2 | 6 | 23 | 33 | −10 | 14 | |
| 7 | Parul FC | 9 | 4 | 1 | 4 | 14 | 15 | −1 | 13 | |
| 8 | Rangers FA | 9 | 2 | 3 | 4 | 7 | 11 | −4 | 9 | |
| 9 | Income Tax SRC | 7 | 1 | 1 | 5 | 10 | 24 | −14 | 4 | Relegation to GSFA 2nd Division |
| 10 | Vapi FC | 9 | 1 | 0 | 8 | 10 | 50 | −40 | 3 | Relegation to GSFA 2nd Division |

Source: GSFA
Rules for classification: 1) points; 2) head-to-head points; 3) head-to-head goal difference; 4) head-to-head goals scored; 5) goal difference; 6) number of goals scored; 7) fair play ranking; 8) drawing of lots
(C) Champions

=== Karnataka (Bengaluru) ===
| Pos | Team | Pld | W | D | L | GF | GA | GD | Pts | Qualification or relegation |
|---|---|---|---|---|---|---|---|---|---|---|
| 1 | SC Bengaluru (C, P) | 18 | 15 | 1 | 2 | 53 | 11 | +42 | 46 | Champions and Qualification to 2023-24 I-League 3 |
| 2 | Bengaluru United | 18 | 14 | 3 | 1 | 66 | 12 | +54 | 45 | |
| 3 | Kickstart (P) | 18 | 13 | 3 | 2 | 54 | 17 | +37 | 42 | Qualification to 2023-24 I-League 3 |
| 4 | Rebels | 18 | 11 | 3 | 4 | 41 | 17 | +24 | 36 | |
| 5 | Bengaluru B | 18 | 10 | 3 | 5 | 52 | 16 | +36 | 33 | |
| 6 | Students Union | 18 | 9 | 4 | 5 | 33 | 24 | +9 | 31 | |
| 7 | Deccan | 18 | 8 | 5 | 5 | 31 | 19 | +12 | 29 | |
| 8 | Bangalore Independents | 18 | 9 | 1 | 8 | 35 | 29 | +6 | 28 | |
| 9 | MEG | 18 | 8 | 4 | 6 | 25 | 20 | +5 | 28 | |
| 10 | ASC | 18 | 5 | 7 | 6 | 33 | 29 | +4 | 22 | |
| 11 | Friends United | 18 | 5 | 7 | 6 | 28 | 36 | −8 | 22 | |
| 12 | Bangalore Dream United | 18 | 6 | 4 | 8 | 24 | 41 | −17 | 22 | |
| 13 | Agniputhra | 18 | 6 | 3 | 9 | 29 | 35 | −6 | 21 | |
| 14 | Kodagu | 18 | 5 | 5 | 8 | 23 | 20 | +3 | 20 | |
| 15 | Roots | 18 | 5 | 5 | 8 | 18 | 23 | −5 | 20 | |
| 16 | Bangalore United FC | 18 | 4 | 3 | 11 | 18 | 47 | −29 | 15 | |
| 17 | Young Challengers | 18 | 4 | 1 | 13 | 13 | 56 | −43 | 13 | |
| 18 | Bangalore Eagles (R) | 18 | 1 | 4 | 13 | 11 | 50 | −39 | 7 | Relegation to 2023-24 BDFA A Division |
| 19 | ADE (R) | 18 | 0 | 0 | 18 | 7 | 92 | −85 | 0 | Relegation to 2023-24 BDFA A Division |
| 20 | Jawahar Union (W) | 0 | 0 | 0 | 0 | 0 | 0 | 0 | 0 | Withdrew |

Rules for classification: 1) points; 2) goal difference; 3) number of goals scored
(C) Champions; (P) Promoted; (R) Relegated; (W) ?

=== Kerala ===
| Pos | Team | Pld | W | D | L | GF | GA | GD | Pts | |
|---|---|---|---|---|---|---|---|---|---|---|
| 1 | Wayanad United FC | 5 | 3 | 2 | 0 | 8 | 3 | +5 | 11 | Advanced to Semi Finals |
| 2 | Kerala Police (A) | 5 | 3 | 1 | 1 | 10 | 7 | +3 | 10 | |
| 3 | Gokulam Kerala B | 5 | 2 | 1 | 2 | 10 | 6 | +4 | 7 | Advanced to Semi Finals |
| 4 | Kerala United (C) | 5 | 2 | 1 | 2 | 8 | 7 | +1 | 7 | Advanced to Semi Finals |
| 5 | Kovalam | 5 | 1 | 1 | 3 | 4 | 10 | −6 | 4 | Advanced to Semi Finals |
| 6 | Kerala Blasters B | 5 | 0 | 2 | 3 | 2 | 8 | −6 | 2 | |

Source: KFA
(A) Withdrew due to participation in the all-India Police Tournament; (C) Champions and Qualification to 2023–24 I-League 3

Final

| 19 March 2023 | Kerala United | 1–0 | Gokulam Kerala B | Kalpetta |
| 19:30 IST | Akhil J. Chandran (OG 78) | | | Stadium: M. K. Jinachandran Memorial District Stadium |

=== Maharashtra (Mumbai) ===
| Pos | Team | Pld | W | D | L | GF | GA | GD | Pts | Qualification |
|---|---|---|---|---|---|---|---|---|---|---|
| 1 | Ambernath United Atlanta | 15 | 14 | 1 | 0 | 68 | 8 | +60 | 43 | Champions |
| 2 | Karnataka Sports Association | 15 | 12 | 2 | 1 | 66 | 12 | +54 | 38 | Harwood Champions League (Note: Since the club represents Karnataka, it is not eligible for 2023–24 I-League 3) |
| 3 | Millat FC | 15 | 12 | 1 | 2 | 51 | 14 | +37 | 37 | 2023–24 I-League 3 and Harwood Champions League |
| 4 | Maharashtra Oranje | 15 | 10 | 2 | 3 | 44 | 15 | +29 | 32 | 2023–24 I-League 2 and Harwood Champions League (Note: In September 2023, Oranje FC took over current champions Ambernath United Atlanta FC. Hence, they will compete as Maharashtra Oranje FC in 2023–24 I-League 2 and Harwood Champions League) |
| 5 | DK Pharma | 15 | 10 | 2 | 3 | 46 | 21 | +25 | 32 | |
| 6 | JMJ Sports | 15 | 8 | 5 | 2 | 27 | 11 | +16 | 29 | |
| 7 | GMSC | 15 | 7 | 1 | 7 | 25 | 26 | −1 | 22 | |
| 8 | PIFA | 15 | 6 | 3 | 6 | 23 | 32 | −9 | 21 | |
| 9 | Mumbai Kenkre | 15 | 5 | 4 | 6 | 23 | 29 | −6 | 19 | |
| 10 | Sellebrity | 15 | 5 | 3 | 7 | 13 | 28 | −15 | 18 | |
| 11 | Protrack | 15 | 4 | 2 | 9 | 19 | 52 | −33 | 14 | |
| 12 | Iron Born CFCI | 15 | 4 | 1 | 10 | 12 | 25 | −13 | 13 | |
| 13 | Bombay Muslims | 15 | 3 | 1 | 11 | 12 | 32 | −20 | 10 | |
| 14 | Rudra | 15 | 3 | 1 | 11 | 19 | 66 | −47 | 10 | |
| 15 | Mumbai Strikers | 15 | 1 | 1 | 13 | 6 | 36 | −30 | 4 | Relegation to MFA Super Premier League |
| 16 | India Rush | 15 | 1 | 0 | 14 | 13 | 60 | −47 | 3 | Relegation to MFA Super Premier League |

Source: MFA Elite Premier League
Rules for classification: 1) points; 2) goal difference; 3) number of goals scored

=== Odisha ===
| Pos | Team | Pld | W | D | L | GF | GA | GD | Pts | Qualification |
|---|---|---|---|---|---|---|---|---|---|---|
| 1 | Sunrise Club (C) | 7 | 5 | 1 | 1 | 11 | 5 | +6 | 16 | Champions, Qualification to 2022 FAO Super Cup, and Possible Qualification to 2023–24 I-League 3 |
| 2 | Radha Raman Club (C) | 7 | 5 | 1 | 1 | 19 | 4 | +15 | 16 | Champions, Qualification to 2022 FAO Super Cup, and Possible Qualification to 2023–24 I-League 3 |
| 3 | Young Utkal Club | 7 | 4 | 1 | 2 | 14 | 7 | +7 | 13 | Qualification to 2022 FAO Super Cup |
| 4 | Sports Hostel | 7 | 4 | 1 | 2 | 12 | 8 | +4 | 13 | Qualification to 2022 FAO Super Cup |
| 5 | Rising Student Club | 7 | 2 | 2 | 3 | 12 | 15 | −3 | 8 | |
| 6 | Rovers Athletic Club | 7 | 2 | 2 | 3 | 10 | 15 | −5 | 8 | |
| 7 | Odisha Police | 7 | 1 | 2 | 4 | 4 | 10 | −6 | 5 | |
| 8 | East Coast Railway | 7 | 0 | 0 | 7 | 3 | 21 | −18 | 0 | Relegation to 2023 FAO Gold League |

Source: Orisports
Rules for classification: 1) points; 2) head-to-head points; 3) head-to-head goal difference; 4) goal difference; 5) number of goals scored; 6) drawing of lots

=== Rajasthan ===
| | Team | Pld | W | D | L | GF | GA | GD | Pts | |
|---|---|---|---|---|---|---|---|---|---|---|
| 1 | Jaipur Elite | 8 | 6 | 2 | 0 | 20 | 8 | 12 | 20 | Champions and nominated to I-League 3 |
| 2 | Jaipur United | 8 | 6 | 0 | 2 | 34 | 5 | 29 | 18 | |
| 3 | Royal FC Jaipur | 8 | 5 | 2 | 1 | 19 | 8 | 11 | 17 | |
| 4 | Rajasthan United | 8 | 5 | 1 | 2 | 23 | 11 | 12 | 16 | |
| 5 | Neerja Modi FA | 8 | 3 | 0 | 5 | 18 | 24 | -6 | 9 | |
| 6 | Brothers United | 8 | 2 | 2 | 4 | 6 | 12 | -6 | 8 | |
| 7 | Delisha | 8 | 2 | 1 | 5 | 13 | 25 | -12 | 7 | |
| 8 | Sunrise | 8 | 2 | 1 | 5 | 14 | 29 | -15 | 7 | |
| 9 | City Wolves | 8 | 0 | 1 | 7 | 5 | 30 | -25 | 1 | |

=== West Bengal (Kolkata) ===
| Pos | Team | Pld | W | D | L | GF | GA | GD | Pts | Qualification |
|---|---|---|---|---|---|---|---|---|---|---|
| 1 | Mohammedan (C) | 4 | 3 | 1 | 0 | 10 | 1 | +9 | 10 | Champions |
| 2 | Bhawanipore | 4 | 2 | 1 | 1 | 7 | 5 | +2 | 7 | Eligible for I-League 2 (Note: If the top teams are already playing in national leagues, then the next highest ranked team(s) would be eligible for I-League 2.) |
| 3 | Aryan | 4 | 1 | 2 | 1 | 4 | 6 | −2 | 5 | Eligible for I-League 2 |
| 4 | East Bengal | 4 | 0 | 3 | 1 | 2 | 4 | −2 | 3 | |
| 5 | Kidderpore | 4 | 0 | 1 | 3 | 2 | 9 | −7 | 1 | |
| 6 | ATK Mohun Bagan | 0 | 0 | 0 | 0 | 0 | 0 | 0 | 0 | Withdrew |

Updated to match(es) played on 1 November. Source: Soccerway
Rules for classification: 1) points; 2) goal difference; 3) number of goals scored; 4) head-to-head points; 5) head-to-head goal difference; 6) fair play ranking; 7) drawing of lots
(C) Champions

== See also ==
- 2022–23 Indian Super League
- 2022–23 I-League
- 2023–24 I-League 3
- 2022–23 Indian Elite League
