= 2018 FAO League =

FAO League
- Season: 2018
- Dates: 17 August - 29 September
- Champions: Sunrise Club (4th title) (Diamond League); Young Utkal Club (Gold League)
- Relegated: Bidanasi Club (Diamond League)
- Matches played: 75
- Goals scored: 187 (2.49 per match)
- Top goalscorer: Md. Fayaz KF (9 goals) (Sunrise Club); Biki Sethi (7 goals) (Sunshine Club); Sanjit Khora (6 goals) (Rising Star Club); Prabhat Dansena (5 goals) (SAI-STC)
- Highest scoring: Town Club 5-2 Yuva Bandhu Cultural Club (YVCG) (4 September 2018); Sunshine Club 7-0 Western Mahaveer Club (25 August 2018)
- All statistics correct as of 21 September 2018.

The 2018 FAO League was the ninth season of the FAO League. Radha Raman Club were the defending champions. Chauliaganj FC entered as the promoted team from the FAO 2nd Division League. The FAO League is organised every year by the Football Association of Odisha (FAO), the official football governing body of Odisha, India. The regular season started on 17 August 2018. Sunrise Club became champions of the 2018 edition of the league, winning their fourth title.

== Teams ==
=== Teams in Diamond League ===
- Bidanasi Club
- East Coast Railway
- Jay Durga Club
- Odisha Police
- Radha Raman Club
- Rising Student's Club
- Sports Hostel
- Sunrise Club

=== Teams in Gold League ===
- Independent Club
- Kishore Club
- Mangala Club
- Radha Gobind Club
- Rising Star Club
- Rovers Club
- Young Utkal Club

=== Teams in Silver League ===
- Azad Hind Club
- Chand Club
- Chauliaganj Club
- Club N Club
- Lalbag Club
- Odisha Government Press (OGP)
- SAI-STC
- State Bank of India
- Sunshine Club
- Town Club
- Western Mahaveer Club
- Yuba Vandhu Cultural Group (YVCG)

== Officiating ==
=== Match Officials ===
- Sujit Kumar Patro

=== Referees ===
- Arun Nayak
- Bhim Kumar Chettri
- Daitari Karua
- Jamal Mohamed
- Jyoti Ranjan Swain
- Nabin Kumar Naik
- R. Palmson Moses
- Raju Mohanty
- Sapneswar Kanhar
- Sheikh Hayat
- Sujit Kumar
- Sudip Das
- Suresh Dash
- Tarun Kumar Pradhan

== Revamp ==
=== League Format ===
In a total revamp of the league, the FAO League was converted from premier league of the state to second highest level footballing league in the year 2018 as the premier state level football league was introduced by the Football Association of Odisha. The league system currently is a three-tier system consisting of Diamond, Gold and Silver leagues. The top four teams of the diamond league and the winners of Gold and Silver league would be promoted to the FAO Super Cup i.e. highest state level football league in Odisha.

== Venue ==
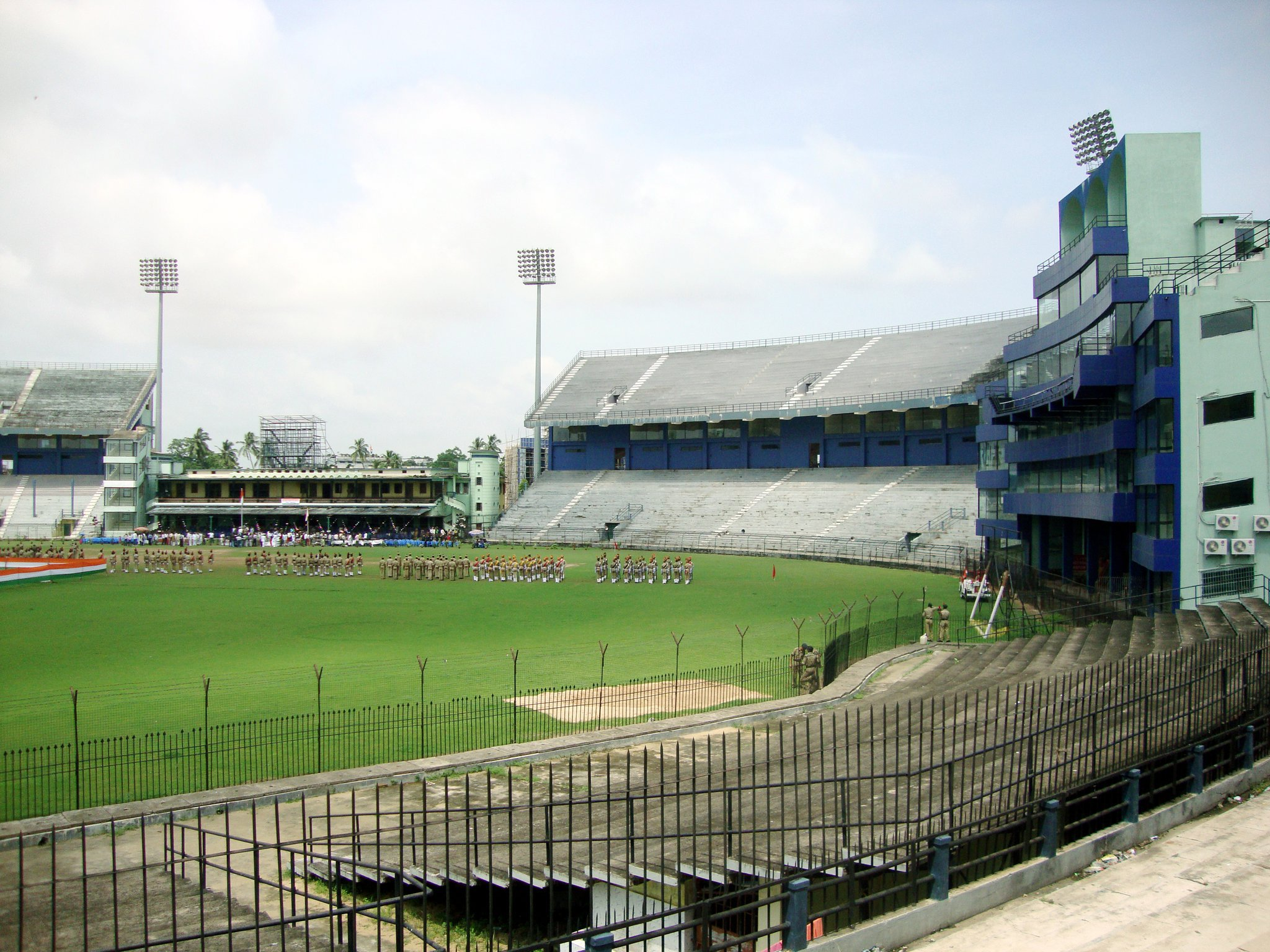
Barabati Stadium in Cuttack, Odisha

== League stage ==
=== Diamond League ===
==== League table ====
| Pos | Team | Pld | W | D | L | GF | GA | GD | Pts | Qualification |
|---|---|---|---|---|---|---|---|---|---|---|
| 1 | Sunrise Club (C) | 7 | 5 | 1 | 1 | 19 | 3 | +16 | 16 | Champions, Advance to FAO Super Cup |
| 2 | Odisha Police | 7 | 5 | 1 | 1 | 13 | 8 | +5 | 16 | Advance to FAO Super Cup |
| 3 | Sports Hostel | 7 | 4 | 3 | 0 | 5 | 3 | +2 | 15 | Advance to FAO Super Cup |
| 4 | Rising Student's Club | 7 | 4 | 2 | 1 | 11 | 4 | +7 | 14 | Advance to FAO Super Cup |
| 5 | East Coast Railway | 7 | 2 | 2 | 3 | 2 | 6 | −4 | 8 | |
| 6 | Jay Durga Club | 7 | 1 | 2 | 4 | 5 | 9 | −4 | 5 | |
| 7 | Radha Raman Club | 7 | 1 | 0 | 6 | 5 | 16 | −11 | 3 | |
| 8 | Bidanasi Club (R) | 7 | 0 | 1 | 6 | 1 | 12 | −11 | 1 | Relegation to Gold League |

Source: Orisports
Rules for classification: 1) points; 2) head-to-head points; 3) head-to-head goal difference; 4) goal difference; 5) number of goals scored; 6) drawing of lots

==== Results ====
| Home \ Away | BC | ER | JD | OP | RR | RS | SC | SH |
|---|---|---|---|---|---|---|---|---|
| Bidanasi Club | — | 0–1 | 0–0 | 1–3 | 0–2 | 0–1 | 0–5 | WO |
| East Coast Railway | 1–0 | — | 0–0 | | 1–0 | 0–0 | 0–3 | 0–1 |
| Jay Durga Club | 0–0 | 0–0 | — | 1–3 | 2–1 | 1–3 | 1–2 | WO |
| Odisha Police | 3–1 | 2–0 | 3–1 | — | 3–1 | 2–1 | 0–4 | 0–0 |
| Radha Raman Club | 2–0 | 0–1 | 1–2 | 1–3 | — | 1–3 | 0–4 | 0–1 |
| Rising Student's Club | 1–0 | 0–0 | 3–1 | 1–2 | 3–1 | — | 1–0 | 2–2 |
| Sunrise Club | 5–0 | 3–0 | 2–1 | 4–0 | 4–0 | 0–1 | — | 1–1 |
| Sports Hostel | WO | 1–0 | WO | 0–0 | 1–0 | 2–2 | 1–1 | — |

Updated to match(es) played on 1 October 2018. Source: Orisports
Legend: Blue = home team win; Yellow = draw; Red = away team win.

=== Gold League ===
| Pos | Team | Pld | W | D | L | GF | GA | GD | Pts | Qualification |
|---|---|---|---|---|---|---|---|---|---|---|
| 1 | Young Utkal Club (C) | 6 | 5 | 1 | 0 | 16 | 2 | +14 | 16 | Promotion to 2019 Diamond League; Advance to 2018 FAO Super Cup |
| 2 | Rising Star Club | 6 | 5 | 0 | 1 | 14 | 6 | +8 | 15 | Advance to 2018 FAO Super Cup |
| 3 | Rovers Club | 6 | 3 | 0 | 3 | 10 | 9 | +1 | 9 | Advance to 2018 FAO Super Cup |
| 4 | Mangala Club | 6 | 2 | 2 | 2 | 2 | 7 | −5 | 8 | |
| 5 | Kishore Club | 5 | 2 | 0 | 3 | 4 | 9 | −5 | 6 | |
| 6 | Radha Gobinda Club | 4 | 0 | 1 | 3 | 2 | 9 | −7 | 1 | |
| 7 | Independent Club (R) | 5 | 0 | 0 | 5 | 0 | 2 | −2 | 0 | Relegation to 2019 Silver League |

Source: Orisports
Rules for classification: 1) points; 2) head-to-head points; 3) head-to-head goal difference; 4) goal difference; 5) number of goals scored; 6) drawing of lots

=== Silver League ===
==== Group stage ====
===== Group A =====
| Pos | Team | Pld | W | D | L | GF | GA | GD | Pts | Qualification |
|---|---|---|---|---|---|---|---|---|---|---|
| 1 | SAI-STC | 5 | 4 | 1 | 0 | 15 | 2 | +13 | 13 | Advance to Silver Play-off |
| 2 | Club N Club | 5 | 3 | 0 | 2 | 13 | 3 | +10 | 9 | |
| 3 | Chauliaganj Club | 4 | 2 | 1 | 1 | 8 | 3 | +5 | 7 | |
| 4 | Odisha Government Press (OGP) | 5 | 1 | 2 | 2 | 0 | 7 | −7 | 5 | |
| 5 | Town Club | 5 | 1 | 1 | 3 | 5 | 13 | −8 | 4 | |
| 6 | Yuba Vandhu Cultural Group (YVCG) | 4 | 0 | 1 | 3 | 2 | 15 | −13 | 1 | Advance to Silver Eliminator |

Source: Orisports
Rules for classification: 1) points; 2) head-to-head points; 3) head-to-head goal difference; 4) goal difference; 5) number of goals scored; 6) drawing of lots

===== Group B =====
| Pos | Team | Pld | W | D | L | GF | GA | GD | Pts | Qualification |
|---|---|---|---|---|---|---|---|---|---|---|
| 1 | Sunshine Club | 5 | 4 | 1 | 0 | 20 | 1 | +19 | 13 | Advance to Play-off |
| 2 | Chand Club | 4 | 2 | 2 | 0 | 6 | 4 | +2 | 8 | |
| 3 | Lalbag Club | 5 | 1 | 3 | 1 | 2 | 3 | −1 | 6 | |
| 4 | State Bank of India (Odisha) | 5 | 1 | 2 | 2 | 7 | 9 | −2 | 5 | |
| 5 | Azad Hind Club | 5 | 1 | 1 | 3 | 5 | 9 | −4 | 4 | |
| 6 | Western Mahaveer Club | 4 | 0 | 1 | 3 | 1 | 16 | −15 | 1 | Advance to Eliminator |

Source: Orisports
Rules for classification: 1) points; 2) head-to-head points; 3) head-to-head goal difference; 4) goal difference; 5) number of goals scored; 6) drawing of lots

== Statistics ==
=== Scoring ===
As of 5 September 2018

==== Hat-tricks ====
| Player | For | Against | Result | Date |
|---|---|---|---|---|
| (India) M Trinath | SAI-STC | Town Club | 5–0 | 23 August 2018 |
| (India) Biki Sethi | Sunshine Club | Western Mahaveer Club | 7–0 | 25 August 2018 |
| (India) Md. Fayaz KF | Sunrise Club | Bidanasi Club | 5–0 | 26 August 2018 |
| (India) Ramesh Murmu | Chauliaganj Club | Odisha Government Press (OGP) | 4–0 | 28 August 2018 |
| (India) Debraj SA | Club 'N' Club | Town Club | 4–0 | 30 August 2018 |
| (India) Harish Chandra Murmu | Town Club | Yuva Bandhu Cultural Group (YVCG) | 5–2 | 4 September 2018 |
