= 2022 FAO League =

FAO League
- Season: 2022
- Dates: 3 July – 1 September
- Champions: Diamond League: Sunrise Club Radha Raman Club (joint-champions); Gold League: Bidanasi Club; Silver League: Kishore Club
- Relegated: Diamond League: East Coast Railway; Gold League: Sunshine Club
- Matches: 65
- Goals: 261 (4.02 per match)
- Top goalscorer: Diamond League: Dinabandhu Das (Young Utkal Club) Raisen Tudu (Sports Hostel) (6 goals); Gold League: Kono Boris (Bidanasi Club) (9 goals); Silver League: Ramesh Chandra Murmu (Chauliaganj Club) (7 goals)
- All statistics correct as of 30 August 2022.

The 2022 FAO League was the eleventh season of the FAO League, the top Odia professional football league, since its establishment in 2010. Sports Hostel were the defending champions. FAO League is annually organised by the Football Association of Odisha (FAO), the official football governing body of Odisha, in association with Department of Sports & Youth Services (DSYS), Government of Odisha.

Due to the COVID-19 pandemic in India, the FAO League had not been organised since its last edition in 2019. After a span of two years, the regular season kicked-off from 3 July 2022. The inauguration ceremony took place at Barabati Stadium, Cuttack. Bhabani Shankar Chayani, Collector & District Magistrate, Cuttack, graced the occasion as the Chief Guest, alongside Pankaj Lochan Mohanty, President, Odisha Cricket Association, as the Guest of Honour. Asirbad Behera, Secretary, Football Association of Odisha, along with all the office bearers and members of Football Association of Odisha, were present for the inauguration ceremony.

Sunrise Club and Radha Raman Club were declared as joint-champions with both teams finishing the Diamond League with 16 points each from 7 games. Both teams won the match 5 times, drew once, and lost once, however, Sunrise Cub emerged at the top of the table as a result of head-to-head points. Bidanasi Club won the Gold League, and earned promotion to the Diamond League for the next season with 16 points from 6 games, where they won 5 and drew 1 of their matches. Kishore Club were the winners of the Silver League, beating Town Club 2–0 in the play-off match of the Silver League. For the 2022 FAO Super Cup, Sunrise Club, Radha Raman Club, Sports Hostel, and Young Utkal Club qualify from the Diamond League, Bidanasi Club, Rising Star Club, and Jay Durga Club qualify from the Gold League, and Kishore Club qualify from the Silver League.

== Teams ==
=== Diamond ===
- East Coast Railway
- Odisha Police
- Radha Raman Club
- Rising Students Club
- Rovers Athletic Club
- Sports Hostel
- Sunrise Club
- Young Utkal Club

=== Gold ===
- Bidanasi Club
- Chand Club
- Jay Durga Club
- Rising Star Club
- Mangala Club
- Radha Gobinda Club
- Sunshine Club

=== Silver ===
==== Silver A ====
- Azad Hind Club
- Kishore Club
- Lalbag Club
- SBI Sports Recreation Club

==== Silver B ====
- Chauliaganj Club
- Odisha Government Press Club
- Town Club
- Royal Club
- Yuva Vandhu Cultural Group (YVCG)

== Venue ==
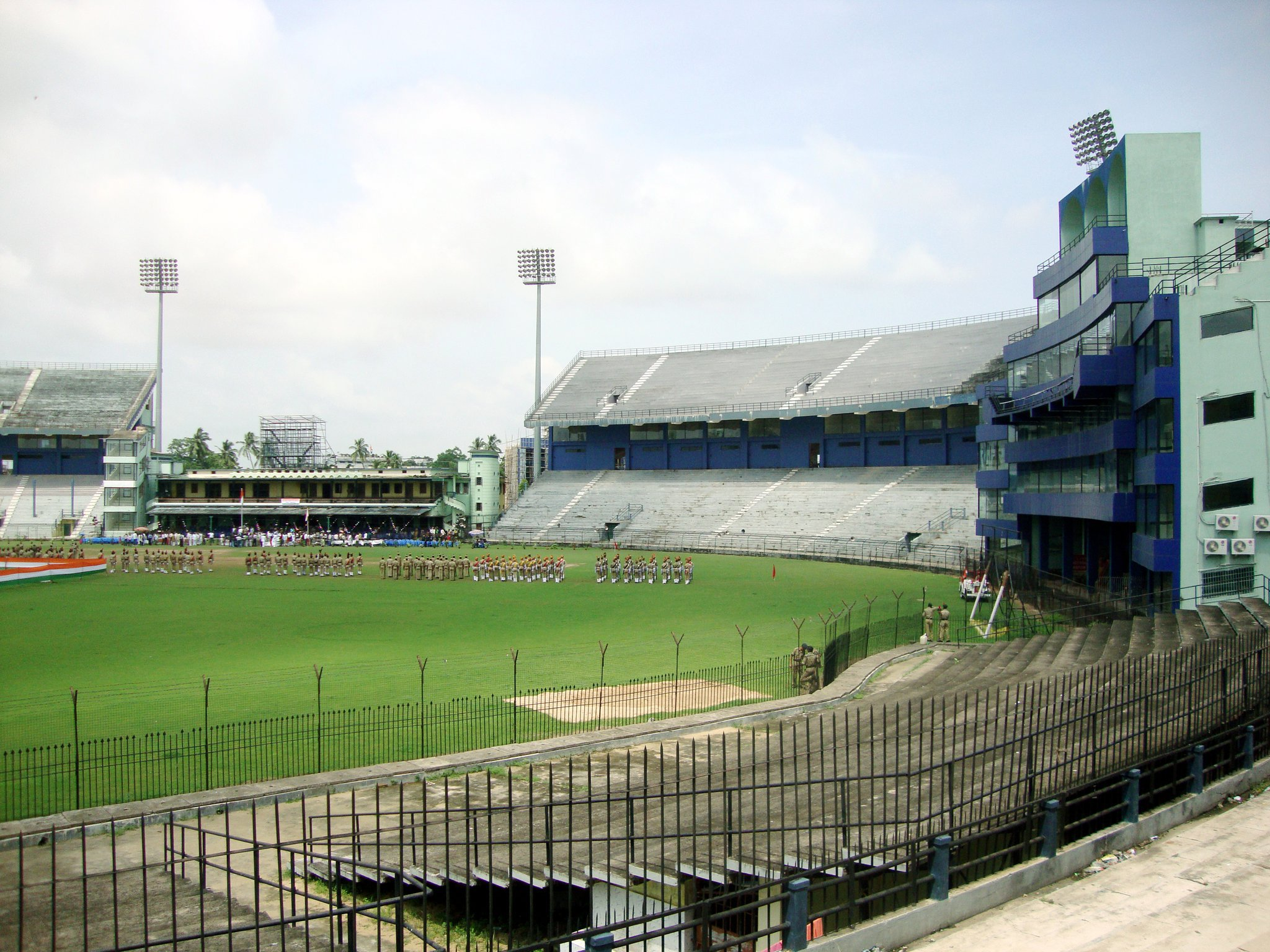
Barabati Stadium in Cuttack, Odisha

== League stage ==
=== Diamond League ===
Pos	Team	Pld	W	D	L	GF	GA	GD	Pts	Qualification
1	Sunrise Club (C)	7	5	1	1	11	5	+6	16	Champions, Qualification to 2022 FAO Super Cup, and Possible Qualification to 2023–24 I-League 3
2	Radha Raman Club (C)	7	5	1	1	19	4	+15	16	Champions, Qualification to 2022 FAO Super Cup, and Possible Qualification to 2023–24 I-League 3
3	Young Utkal Club	7	4	1	2	14	7	+7	13	Qualification to 2022 FAO Super Cup
4	Sports Hostel	7	4	1	2	12	8	+4	13	Qualification to 2022 FAO Super Cup
5	Rising Student Club	7	2	2	3	12	15	−3	8	
6	Rovers Athletic Club	7	2	2	3	10	15	−5	8	
7	Odisha Police	7	1	2	4	4	10	−6	5	
8	East Coast Railway	7	0	0	7	3	21	−18	0	Relegation to 2023 FAO Gold League

Source: Orisports
Rules for classification: 1) points; 2) head-to-head points; 3) head-to-head goal difference; 4) goal difference; 5) number of goals scored; 6) drawing of lots

=== Gold League ===
Pos	Team	Pld	W	D	L	GF	GA	GD	Pts	Qualification
1	Bidanasi Club (C)	6	5	1	0	24	6	+18	16	Promotion to 2023 FAO Diamond League; Qualification to 2022 FAO Super Cup
2	Rising Star Club	6	4	2	0	17	6	+11	14	Qualification to 2022 FAO Super Cup
3	Jay Durga Club	6	4	1	1	12	5	+7	13	Qualification to 2022 FAO Super Cup
4	Chand Club	6	3	0	3	20	14	+6	9	
5	Radha Gobinda Club	6	2	0	4	19	25	−6	6	
6	Mangala Club	6	1	0	5	7	20	−13	3	
7	Sunshine Club	6	0	0	6	7	30	−23	0	Relegation to 2023 FAO Silver League

Source: Orisports
Rules for classification: 1) points; 2) head-to-head points; 3) head-to-head goal difference; 4) goal difference; 5) number of goals scored; 6) drawing of lots

=== Silver League ===
==== Group stage ====
===== Group A =====
Pos	Team	Pld	W	D	L	GF	GA	GD	Pts	Qualification
1	Kishore Club	2	2	0	0	8	2	+6	6	Advance to Silver Group Promotion Play-off
2	Lalbag Club	3	1	1	1	4	6	−2	4	
3	Azad Hind Club	3	1	0	2	9	11	−2	3	
4	SBI Sports Recreation Club	2	0	1	1	5	7	−2	1	Relegation to 2023 FAO Second Division League

Source: Orisports
Rules for classification: 1) points; 2) head-to-head points; 3) head-to-head goal difference; 4) goal difference; 5) number of goals scored; 6) drawing of lots

===== Group B =====
Pos	Team	Pld	W	D	L	GF	GA	GD	Pts	Qualification
1	Town Club	4	3	1	0	14	2	+12	10	Advance to Silver Group Promotion Play-off
2	Chauliaganj Club	4	2	2	0	15	7	+8	8	
3	Royal Club	4	2	1	1	8	7	+1	7	
4	Odisha Government Press Club	4	0	1	3	4	10	−6	1	
5	Yuva Vandhu Cultural Group (YVCG)	4	0	1	3	1	16	−15	1	Relegation to 2023 FAO Second Division League

Source: Orisports
Rules for classification: 1) points; 2) head-to-head points; 3) head-to-head goal difference; 4) goal difference; 5) number of goals scored; 6) drawing of lots

==== Promotion Play-off ====
30 August 2022	Kishore Club	2–0	Town Club	Barabati Stadium, Cuttack
	Jagdish Oram 50'; Ansh Chatria 74'

== Statistics ==
=== Scoring ===
As of 30 August 2022

==== Diamond League ====
Rank	Player	Club	Goals
Diamond
1	Raisen Tudu	Sports Hostel	6
1	Dinabandhu Das	Young Utkal Club	6
2	Antarjami Naik	Rising Student Club	4
2	Arjun Nayak	Radha Raman Club	4
2	Bhole Shankar Majhi	Odisha Police	4
2	Sanjit Khara	Rovers Athletic Club	4
3	Babul Kumar Rout	Young Utkal Club	3
3	Biki Sethi	Radha Raman Club	3
3	Irshad SP	Sunrise Club	3
3	Parao Tudu	Sports Hostel	3
3	Sourav Ranjan Hanuman	Radha Raman Club	3
4	Anand Oram	Rising Student Club	2
4	Binay Kisan	Radha Raman Club	2
4	Edwin Tirkey	Rovers Athletic Club	2
4	Francis Lakra	Sunrise Club	2
4	Ganesh Sethi	Young Utkal Club	2
4	Kartik Hantal	Rovers Athletic Club	2
4	Krishanu Das	Radha Raman Club	2
4	Sanjit Panna	East Coast Railway	2
4	Sheikh Farid	Rising Student Club	2
5	Abubakar Alhassan	Sunrise Club	1
5	Anand Lakra	Sunrise Club	1
5	Arunanshu Gupta	Rovers Athletic Club	1
5	Bapuni Bindhani	Young Utkal Club	1
5	Bhagaban Chuniar	Sports Hostel	1
5	Bikram Majhi	Radha Raman Club	1
5	Bijay Kumar Barik	Young Utkal Club	1
5	Chandra Muduli	Rovers Athletic Club	1
5	D. Srinath	Radha Raman Club	1
5	Deepak Oram	Sunrise Club	1
5	Guman Singh	Rovers Athletic Club	1
5	Jamir Oram	Rising Student Club	1
5	Keshi Hansdah	East Coast Railway	1
5	Mahesh Pradhan	Sunrise Club	1
5	Pintu Samal	Sports Hostel	1
5	Rakesh Sahoo	Young Utkal Club	1
5	Sadhu Marandi	Sunrise Club	1
5	Samuel Kane	Sunrise Club	1
5	Sanjib Oram	Sports Hostel	1
5	Souvik Chatterjee	Rovers Athletic Club	1
5	Srikant Bhoi	Radha Raman Club	1
5	V. Srinivas	Radha Raman Club	1
5	Y. Gothankar	Radha Raman Club	1

==== Gold League ====
Rank	Player	Club	Goals
Gold
1	Kono Boris	Bidanasi Club	9
2	Janmo Xess	Chand Club	8
3	Pradhan Murmu	Radha Gobinda Club	6
3	Prakash Naik	Bidanasi Club	6
4	Pradhan Murmu	Radha Gobinda Club	5
5	Manoj Das	Bidanasi Club	4
5	Mohammed Habib	Chand Club	4
5	Rajesh Nayak	Bidanasi Club	4
6	Debraj Saha	Mangala Club	3
6	Dharmendra Pradhan	Jay Durga Club	3
6	Jitu Muduli	Rising Star Club	3
6	Parmeswar Tirkey	Radha Gobinda Club	3
6	Prakash Badai	Chand Club	3
6	Rohit Bada	Radha Gobinda Club	3
6	Roshan Panna	Radha Gobinda Club	3
6	Sunil Sardar	Jay Durga Club	3
6	Tridev Mukhi	Sunshine Club	3
7	Anish Darjy	Chand Club	2
7	Arjun Muduli	Rising Star Club	2
7	B. Siba	Radha Gobinda Club	2
7	Bikash Padhiary	Jay Durga Club	2
7	Chand Gopi	Sunshine Club	2
7	Chandra Sekhar Behera	Rising Star Club	2
7	Chandrakant Das	Bidanasi Club	2
7	Sanjay Dungia	Chand Club	2
7	Sayed Manzoor Ali	Jay Durga Club	2
8	Abhishek Kerketta	Jay Durga Club	1
8	Bijay Das	Mangala Club	1
8	Bimal Berua	Sunshine Club	1
8	Chandan Nayak	Mangala Club	1
8	Chandan Ram	Radha Gobinda Club	1
8	Dasarath Munda	Mangala Club	1
8	Dommane Kilane	Chand Club	1
8	Doulamuni Dharua	Bidanasi Club	1
8	Khagewar Lakra	Bidanasi Club	1
8	Malav Nayak	Mangala Club	1
8	Niraj Mahapatra	Bidanasi Club	1
8	Paresh Behera	Rising Star Club	1
8	Prafulla Lakra	Bidanasi Club	1
8	Sayed Sansherhak	Sunshine Club	1
8	Sheikh Sahanawaz Alam	Jay Durga Club	1
8	Sheikh Saqib Shahzada	Rising Star Club	1
8	Shinu	Bidanasi Club	1
8	Shreeyanshu Sinha	Radha Gobinda Club	1
8	Usta Jani	Rising Star Club	1
8	Vimal Kumar	Rising Star Club	1

==== Silver League ====
Rank	Player	Club	Goals
Silver
1	Ramesh Chandra Murmu	Chauliaganj Club	7
2	Papu Majhi	Town Club	6
3	Soumya Ranjan Swain	Town Club	5
4	Ghanashyam Sa	Azad Hind Club	3
5	Abdul Rajak Siliki	Kishore Club	2
5	Abhinas Samal	Royal Club	2
5	Ajay Barua	Royal Club	2
5	Bhabani Shankar Biswal	Odisha Government Press Club	2
5	Dara Singh Jamunda	Chauliaganj Club	2
5	Mahesh Singh	Town Club	2
5	Mana Karangia	Chauliaganj Club	2
5	Om Mahanda	Odisha Government Press Club	2
5	Sabir Khan	Royal Club	2
5	Shraban Nayak	Lalbag Club	2
5	Swadhin Badhai	Kishore Club	2
6	Ashish Samal	Royal Club	1
6	Ankit Behera	Kishore Club	1
6	Ansh Chatria	Kishore Club	1
6	Anurag Sahu	Kishore Club	1
6	Basudev Naik	Azad Hind Club	1
6	Bhabagrahi Kumura	Azad Hind Club	1
6	Bibek Bag	Kishore Club	1
6	Biswajit Parija	SBI Sports Recreation Club	1
6	Ganeshwar Sidhu	Chauliaganj Club	1
6	Jagdish Oram	Kishore Club	1
6	Jasobanta Mirdha	Azad Hind Club	1
6	Kabu Sahoo	Chauliaganj Club	1
6	Keshaba Majhi	Azad Hind Club	1
6	Kunaram Soren	Lalbag Club	1
6	Lakhiram Hembram	SBI Sports Recreation Club	1
6	Mohit Kumar Samal	Royal Club	1
6	Prabhat Dansena	Kishore Club	1
6	Rajesh Chatar	SBI Sports Recreation Club	1
6	Ramesh Birua	SBI Sports Recreation Club	1
6	Sadananda Kumura	Azad Hind Club	1
6	Satyaban Kishan	Azad Hind Club	1
6	Sheikh Saizada	Lalbag Club	1
6	Shyam Soren	Chauliaganj Club	1
6	Sidan Balmuch	SBI Sports Recreation Club	1
6	Siddarth Nayak	Yuva Vandhu Cultural Group (YVCG)	1
6	Sunil Bhoi	Town Club	1

==== Hat-tricks ====
Player	For	Against	Result	Date	Ref
(India) Bhole Shankar Majhi	Odisha Police	East Coast Railway	3–1	14 July 2022	
(India) Sanjit Khara	Rovers Club	East Coast Railway	3–1	19 July 2022	
(India) Ramesh Chandra Murmu	Chauliaganj Club	Yuva Vandhu Cultural Group (YVCG)	7–0	28 July 2022	
(India) Mohammed Habib	Chand Club	Radha Gobinda Club	6–3	2 August 2022	
(India) Rohit Bada	Radha Gobinda Club	Mangala Club	8–2	7 August 2022	
(India) Pradhan Munda	Radha Gobinda Club	Mangala Club	8–2	7 August 2022	
(India) Rajesh Nayak	Bidanasi Club	Radha Gobinda Club	9–0	25 August 2022	

==== Own-goals ====
Player	For	Against	Result	Date	Ref
(India) Ashish Samal (Royal Club)	Chauliaganj Club	Royal Club	3–3	23 July 2022	
(India) Rakesh Sahu (Young Utkal Club)	Rising Student Club	Young Utkal Club	1–2	26 August 2022	
