= 2022 FAO Super Cup =

2022 Super Cup
FAO Super Cup

Tournament details
- Country: India
- Venue(s): CRRI Ground; Barabati Stadium (Cuttack)
- Dates: 11–18 September 2022 (Quarter-finals); 30 June – 2 July 2023 (Semi-finals & Final)
- Teams: 8

Final positions
- Champions: Rising Star Club (1st title)
- Runners-up: Bidanasi Club

Tournament statistics
- Matches played: 7
- Goals scored: 16 (2.29 per match)
- All statistics correct as of 2 July 2023.

The 2022 FAO Super Cup was the second edition of the FAO Super Cup, the main club knockout football competition of Odisha, India. The competition ran from 11 to 18 September 2022. The entire tournament took place at one venue i.e. the CRRI Ground in Cuttack. Due to the COVID-19 pandemic in India, the Super Cup had not been organised since 2018, and hence this edition was only the second edition of the Super Cup, after its inaugural 2018 edition. Rising Star Club became the champions, winning their first title after defeating Bidanasi Club in the final on penalties.

The competition features teams from the Silver, Gold and Diamond competitions of the FAO League, the premier state level football league in Odisha, India. The top four teams from the Diamond League, top three from Silver League, and the winners of the Silver League qualify for the tournament.

== Teams ==
A total of 8 teams will participate in the competition. From FAO League, the top four teams from the Diamond Division, three from the Gold Division, and the winner of Silver Division play-off will qualify for the tournament.

Team	Qualifying method	App. (last)
Sunrise Club	2022 FAO Diamond League champions	2nd (2018)
Radha Raman Club	2022 FAO Diamond League runners-up	1st
Sports Hostel	2022 FAO Diamond League third place	2nd (2018)
Young Utkal Club	2022 FAO Diamond League fourth place	1st
Bidanasi Club	2022 FAO Gold League champions	1st
Rising Star Club	2022 FAO Gold League runners-up	2nd (2018)
Jay Durga Club	2022 FAO Gold League third place	1st
Kishore Club	2022 FAO Silver League champions	1st

=== Dates ===
Phase	Round	Dates
Main Tournament	Quarter-finals	11–14 September 2022
Main Tournament	Semi-finals	30 June 2023
Main Tournament	Final	2 July 2023

== Quarter-finals ==
11 September 2022

Sunrise Club	3–1	Kishore Club
Arpan Lakra 3'; Rahan Bramha 59'; Mahesh Pradhan 71'	Report	Ankit Behera 90+1'

CRRI Ground, Cuttack

12 September 2022

Radha Raman Club	0–0 (a.e.t.)	Jay Durga Club
	Report
Penalties
	3–4

CRRI Ground, Cuttack

13 September 2022

Sports Hostel	0–0 (a.e.t.)	Rising Star Club
	Report
Penalties
	1–3

CRRI Ground, Cuttack

14 September 2022

Young Utkal Club	0–0 (a.e.t.)	Bidanasi Club
	Report
Penalties
	3–5

CRRI Ground, Cuttack

== Semi-finals ==
30 June 2023
16:00 IST

Sunrise Club	2–3	Rising Star Club
Flinto F. 53'; Samir Kerketta 84'	Report	Madhu Jani 63', 81'; Jitu Muduli 86'

Barabati Stadium, Cuttack, Odisha

30 June 2023
16:00 IST

Jay Durga Club	2–5	Bidanasi Club
Janmo Xess 63', 87'	Report	Rajesh Kumar Nayak 8', 26'; Rajesh Nayak 43', 44'; Antarjami Naik 49'

Barabati Stadium, Cuttack, Odisha

== Final ==
2 July 2023
16:00 IST

Rising Star Club	0–0	Bidanasi Club
	Report
Penalties
	2–0

Barabati Stadium, Cuttack, Odisha

== See also ==
- 2023 FAO League
- 2018 FAO Super Cup
- FAO League
- FAO Super Cup
- Odisha Women's League
- Odisha football team
- Odisha women's football team
- Football Association of Odisha
