= 2019 FAO League =

FAO League
- Season: 2019
- Dates: 24 July – 22 September
- Champions: Odisha Sports Hostel (1st title)
- Promoted: Odisha Sports Hostel
- Relegated: Jay Durga Club
- Matches: 63
- Goals: 202 (3.21 per match)
- Top goalscorer: Arunanshu Gupta (Rovers Club) (9 goals)
- Highest scoring: Chauliaganj Club 6–3 Independent Club (26 August 2019)
- All statistics correct as of 12 September 2019.

The 2019 FAO League was the tenth season of the FAO League, the top Odia professional football league, since its establishment in 2010. Sunrise Club were the defending champions whereas Bidanasi Club were relegated from the Diamond League last season and played in the Gold League in the 2019 edition. The FAO League is annually organised by the Football Association of Odisha (FAO), the official football governing body of Odisha, India. The regular season started on 24 July. Sunrise Club were the defending champions, ending up at the top with sixteen points having a positive goal difference of fifteen. Odisha Police ended their 2018 FAO League stage at the runners-up spot with sixteen points, having a positive goal difference of nine.

Odisha Sports Hostel won their maiden title, ending up at the top with sixteen points having a positive goal difference of seven. Rising Student's Club were the runners up with fifteen points. In the Gold Division, Rovers Club topped the table with eleven points, having a positive goal difference of nine. Rising Star Club ended their group stage campaign with eight points having a positive goal difference of one. In the Silver Division, SAI-STC and Club N Club qualified for the Silver Play-Off. However, Club N Club failed to put up a team for the play-off, hence SAI-STC were crowned as the champions of the Silver Division.

== Teams ==
=== Diamond ===
- Sunrise Club
- Odisha Police
- Sports Hostel
- Rising Students Club
- East Coast Railway
- Radha Raman Club
- Jay Durga Club
- Young Utkal Club

=== Gold ===
- Bidanasi Club
- Rising Star Club
- Rovers Club
- Mangala Club
- Radha Gobinda Club
- Sunshine Club

=== Silver ===
==== Silver A ====
- SAI-STC Cuttack
- Chand Club
- Lalbag Club
- State Bank of India
- Azad Hind Club

==== Silver B ====
- Independent Club
- Chauliaganj Club
- Club N Club
- Town Club
- Royal Club

== Venue ==
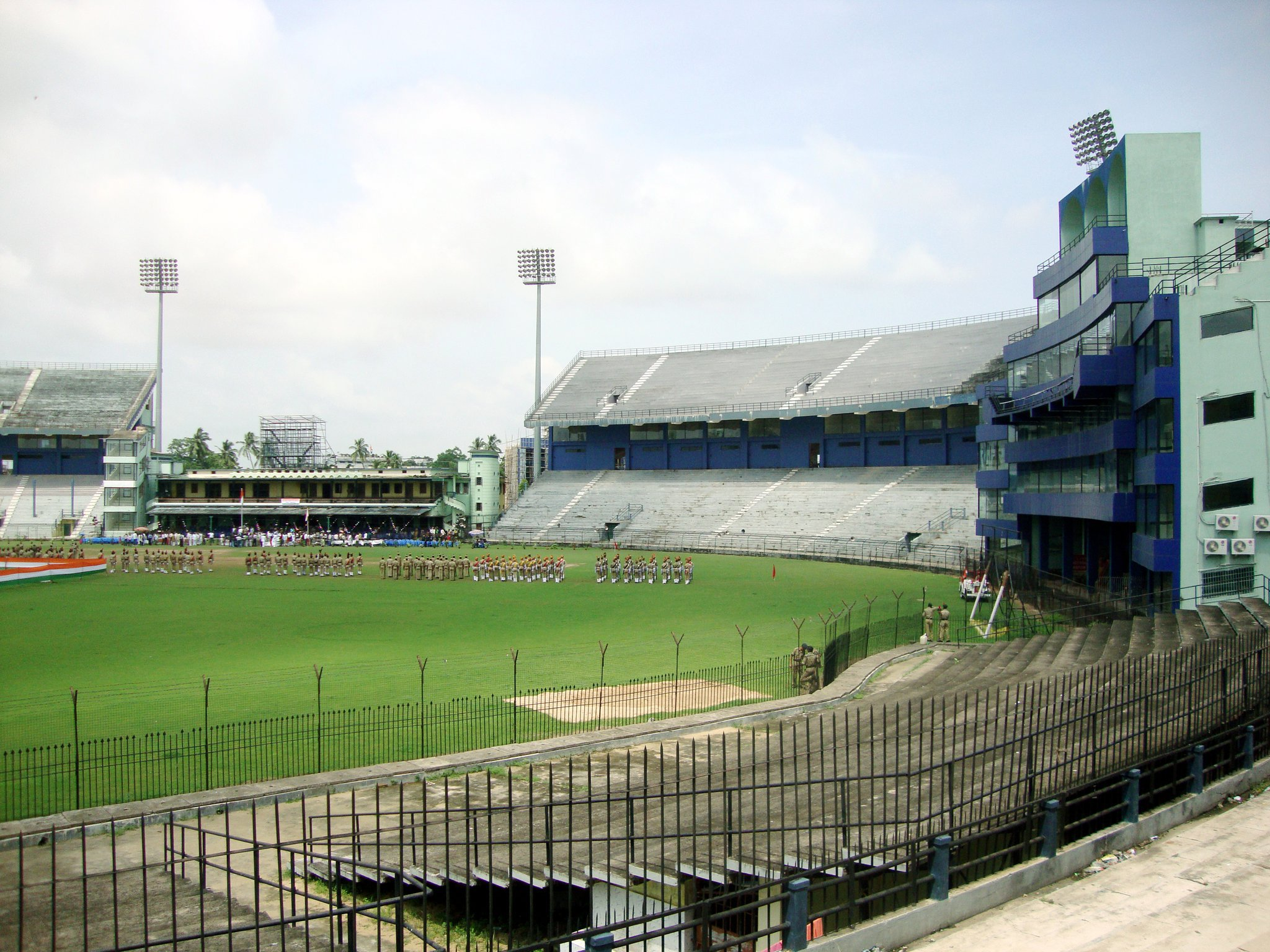
Barabati Stadium in Cuttack, Odisha

== League stage ==
=== Diamond League ===
==== League table ====
Pos	Team	Pld	W	D	L	GF	GA	GD	Pts	Qualification
1	Sports Hostel (C)	7	5	1	1	12	5	+7	16	Champions, Advance to FAO Super Cup
2	Rising Student Club	7	5	0	2	14	7	+7	15	Advance to FAO Super Cup
3	Sunrise Club	7	4	1	2	13	4	+9	13	Advance to FAO Super Cup
4	Odisha Police	7	4	1	2	9	4	+5	13	Advance to FAO Super Cup
5	Radha Raman Club	7	2	2	3	12	7	+5	8	
6	Young Utkal Club	7	2	0	5	7	21	−14	6	
7	East Coast Railway	7	1	2	4	7	16	−9	5	
8	Jay Durga Club (R)	7	1	1	5	6	16	−10	4	Relegation to Gold League

Source: Orisports
Rules for classification: 1) points; 2) head-to-head points; 3) head-to-head goal difference; 4) goal difference; 5) number of goals scored; 6) drawing of lots

Note: Top four teams of Diamond League would qualify for the FAO Super Cup.

==== Results ====
Home \ Away	ER	JD	OP	RR	RS	SC	SH	YU
East Coast Railway	—	3–2	1–2	1–1	0–2	0–6	1–1	1–2
Jay Durga Club	2–3	—	0–0	0–4	2–6	0–1	2–1	0–1
Odisha Police	2–1	0–0	—	2–0	1–0	0–2	0–1	4–0
Radha Raman Club	1–1	4–0	0–2	—	1–2	0–0	0–1 (Note: Match was adjourned at the 29th minute since Radha Raman Club refused to compete further over one of the referee's decision. The matter has been referred to the committee for further proceedings.)	6–1
Rising Student's Club	2–0	6–2	0–1	2–1	—	1–0	0–2	3–1
Sunrise Club	6–0	1–0	2–0	0–0	0–1	—	0–3	4–0
Sports Hostel	1–1	1–2	1–0	1–0 (Note: Match was adjourned at the 29th minute since Radha Raman Club refused to compete further over one of the referee's decision. The matter has been referred to the committee for further proceedings.)	2–0	3–0	—	3–2
Young Utkal Club	2–1	1–0	0–4	1–6	1–3	0–4	2–3	—

Source: Orisports
Legend: Blue = home team win; Yellow = draw; Red = away team win.

=== Gold League ===
Pos	Team	Pld	W	D	L	GF	GA	GD	Pts	Qualification
1	Rovers Club (Q) (C)	5	3	2	0	14	5	+9	11	Promotion to Diamond League; Advance to FAO Super Cup
2	Rising Star Club (Q)	5	2	2	1	6	5	+1	8	Advance to FAO Super Cup
3	Radha Gobinda Club (Q)	4	2	1	1	10	7	+3	7	Advance to FAO Super Cup
4	Sunshine Club	4	1	1	2	4	6	−2	4	
5	Mangala Club	5	1	1	3	7	13	−6	4	
6	Bidanasi Club (R)	5	0	3	2	5	10	−5	3	Relegation to Silver League

Updated to match(es) played on 12 September 2019. Source: Orisports
Rules for classification: 1) points; 2) head-to-head points; 3) head-to-head goal difference; 4) goal difference; 5) number of goals scored; 6) drawing of lots

Note: Top three teams of the Gold League would qualify for the FAO Super Cup.

=== Silver League ===
==== Group stage ====
===== Group A =====
Pos	Team	Pld	W	D	L	GF	GA	GD	Pts	Qualification
1	SAI-STC (Q) (C)	4	3	1	0	14	2	+12	10	Playoffs
2	Chand Club	4	3	0	1	18	3	+15	9	
3	Azad Hind Club	4	1	1	2	5	13	−8	4	
4	SBI Odisha	4	0	2	2	1	9	−8	2	
5	Lalbag Club	4	0	2	2	4	15	−11	2	Silver Eliminator

Source: Orisports
Rules for classification: 1) points; 2) head-to-head points; 3) head-to-head goal difference; 4) goal difference; 5) number of goals scored; 6) drawing of lots

===== Group B =====
Pos	Team	Pld	W	D	L	GF	GA	GD	Pts	Qualification
1	Club N Club (Q)	4	3	1	0	6	3	+3	10	Playoffs
2	Chauliaganj Club	4	3	0	1	10	5	+5	9	
3	Royal Club	4	2	0	2	6	2	+4	6	
4	Independent Club	4	1	1	2	10	9	+1	4	
5	Town Club	4	0	0	4	2	15	−13	0	Silver Eliminator

Source: Orisports
Rules for classification: 1) points; 2) head-to-head points; 3) head-to-head goal difference; 4) goal difference; 5) number of goals scored; 6) drawing of lots

==== Playoffs ====
===== Final =====
11 September 2019	SAI-STC	W/O	Club N Club	Barabati Stadium, Cuttack
		Report

== Statistics ==
=== Scoring ===
==== Top scorers ====
As of 12 September 2019

Rank	Player	Club	Goals
1	Arunanshu Gupta	Rovers Club	9
2	Chandra Sekhar Behera	Chand Club	6
3	Antarjami Nayak	Radha Gobinda Club	5
3	Dara Singh Jamuda	Chauliaganj Club	5
3	Francis Lakra	Sports Hostel	5
3	Pravat Dansena	SAI-STC Cuttack	5
4	Johnson Kiro	Rising Student's Club	4
4	Sheikh Farid	Chand Club	4
4	Shibo Kindo	Independent Club	4
5	Arun Budula	Odisha Police	3
5	Basudev Nayak	Azad Hind Club	3
5	Dinabandhu Dash	Young Utkal Club	3
5	Jagdish Oram	SAI-STC Cuttack	3
5	Md. Fayaz KF	Sunrise Club	3
5	Pranab Barik	Royal Club	3
5	Richard Omuah Kissi	Radha Raman Club	3
5	Sanatan Lohar	East Coast Railways	3
5	Abhinash Samal	SAI-STC Cuttack	2
5	Adwin Tirkey	Rising Student's Club	2
5	Arjun Muduli	Rising Star Club	2
5	Arpan Lakra	Sunrise Club	2
5	Badal Kumar Bhoi	Sunshine Club	2
5	Bhabagrahi Padhiary	Sports Hostel	2
5	Bijay Ghallan	Odisha Police	2
5	Deepak Biswal	Young Utkal Club	2
5	Dhiraj Prakash Meher	Radha Raman Club	2
5	Jaysingh Gagrayi	Sports Hostel	2
5	M Trinath	SAI-STC Cuttack	2
5	Manjit Kissan	Sports Hostel	2
5	Manoj Kumar Das	Bidanasi Club	2
5	Md. Afridi	Chand Club	2
5	Md. Javed	Lalbag Club	2
5	Mukhwinderjit Singh	Sunrise Club	2
5	Opara Ndubuisi	Jay Durga Club	2
5	Pabitra Minz	Independent Club	2
5	Papu Majhi	Mangala Club	2
5	Pradyumna Swain	Independent Club	2
5	Pramod Kumar Das	Odisha Police	2
5	Rajesh Nayak	Rising Student's Club	2
5	Raju Bisar	Rising Student's Club	2
5	Sanjeet Panna	East Coast Railways	2
5	Sanjit Khora	Radha Gobinda Club	2
5	Sheikh Imtiaz Ali	Chand Club	2
5	Shyam Sundar Soren	Chauliaganj Club	2
5	Sunil Sardar	Sunrise Club	2
5	Tofan Nayak	Mangala Club	2
7	Ajay Barwa	SAI-STC Cuttack	1
7	Ajay Behera	Bidanasi Club	1
7	Akash Das	Sunshine Club	1
7	Akash Oram	Rovers Club	1
7	Almaz Pervez	Bidanasi Club	1
7	Ambika Lakra	Sunrise Club	1
7	Arbind Lakra	Rising Student's Club	1
7	Arjun Nayak	Radha Raman Club	1
7	Babul Rout	Mangala Club	1
7	Bapi Soren	Royal Club	1
7	Basanta Kalo	Azad Hind Club	1
7	Betal Lakra	Radha Raman Club	1
7	Bijay Kumar Barik	Young Utkal Club	1
7	Bikash Barla	Club N Club	1
7	Bikash Sahoo	Young Utkal Club	1
7	Blacky Lakra	East Coast Railways	1
7	Dhananjay Majhi	Radha Raman Club	1
7	Edwin Tirkey	Rising Student's Club	1
7	Ganga Oram	Club N Club	1
7	Govinda Senapati	Odisha Police	1
7	Gurpreet Singh	Sunrise Club	1
7	Hemant Hansda	SAI-STC Cuttack	1
7	Jagan Das	Town Club	1
7	Jagmohan Jerai	Odisha Police	1
7	Jayanta Kumar Behera	State Bank of India	1
7	Jayanta Mahanta	Radha Raman Club	1
7	Jugeswar Bag	Independent Club	1
7	Janmo Xess	Radha Gobinda Club	1
7	Jamir Oram	Radha Gobinda Club	1
7	Karfulla Lakra	Bidanasi Club	1
7	Kartik Hantal	Rising Star Club	1
7	Keshab Majhi	Azad Hind Club	1
7	Khitish Dansena	Club N Club	1
7	Kishan Oram	Jay Durga Club	1
7	Krisanu Das	Mangala Club	1
7	Kwabena Kemavor	Radha Raman Club	1
7	Laxman Bindhani	Sports Hostel	1
7	Mahendra Soren	Chauliaganj Club	1
7	Malay Nayak	Mangala Club	1
7	Mano Karangia	Chauliaganj Club	1
7	Md. Bilal	Chand Club	1
7	Mihir Bhoi	Independent Club	1
7	Naren Suna	Rovers Club	1
7	Naresh Bhumi	Rising Star Club	1
7	Nirmal Kumar	Sunrise Club	1
7	Nitesh Mondal	Radha Raman Club	1
7	Purna Chandra Samal	Sunshine Club	1
7	Raj Kumar Das	Jay Durga Club	1
7	Raja Das	Rovers Club	1
7	Rajiv Das	Club N Club	1
7	Ramesh Chandra Murmu	Chauliaganj Club	1
7	Ramesh Oram	Sunrise Club	1
7	Sanjay Hembram	Royal Club	1
7	Sanjay Khadia	Club N Club	1
7	Saroj Behera	Royal Club	1
7	Shasikant Sandyl	Chand Club	1
7	Sheikh Mustakim	East Coast Railways	1
7	Sheikh Shahid	Lalbag Club	1
7	Sheikh Shahzad	SAI-STC Cuttack	1
7	Sheikh Zahid	Rising Student's Club	1
7	Sheikh Zuber	Jay Durga Club	1
7	Sona Hara	Rovers Club	1
7	Sourav Mukherjee	Rising Star Club	1
7	SS Alam	Rising Student's Club	1
7	Sukru Oram	Rovers Club	1
7	Sumit Oram	Radha Gobinda Club	1
7	Sunil Toppo	Club N Club	1
7	Syed Abu Hurera	Jay Durga Club	1

==== Hat-tricks ====
Player	For	Against	Result	Date	Ref
(India) Francis Lakra	Sports Hostel	Sunrise	3–0	5 August 2019	
(India) Sheikh Farid	Chand	Lalbag	6–1	17 August 2019	
(India) Pravat Dansena	SAI-STC Cuttack	Lalbag	7–1	22 August 2019	
(Ghana) Richard Omuah Kissi	Radha Raman	Young Utkal	6–1	24 August 2019	
(India) Dara Singh Jamuda	Chauliaganj Club	Independent	6–3	26 August 2019	
(India) Chandra Sekhar Behera	Chand Club	State Bank of India	6–0	29 August 2019	
(India) Chandra Sekhar Behera	Chand Club	Azad Hind Club	6–1	1 September 2019	
(India) Antarjami Nayak	Radha Gobinda Club	Mangala Club	4–1	10 September 2019	

==== Own Goals ====
- Ajit Rout (Mangala Club)
- Bibhu Ranjan Nayak (State Bank of India)
- Emanuel Tirkey (Jay Durga Club)
- Kshitish Dansena (Club N Club)
- Md. Javed (Lalbag Club)
