= 2018 FAO Super Cup =

2018 Super Cup
FAO Super Cup

Tournament details
- Country: India
- Venue(s): Barabati Stadium, Cuttack
- Dates: 2–7 October 2018
- Teams: 8

Final positions
- Champions: Sunrise Club (1st title)
- Runners-up: Rising Student's Club

Tournament statistics
- Matches played: 7
- Goals scored: 18 (2.57 per match)
- Top goal scorers: (India) Arbind Lakra (Rising Student's); (India) Gurpreet Singh (Sunrise); (India) Lakhai Murmu (Rising Student's); (India) Md. Fayaz KF (Sunrise); (India) Sheikh Farid (Rising Student's) (2 goals)

The 2018 FAO Super Cup was the inaugural edition of the FAO Super Cup, the main club knockout football competition of Odisha, India. The competition began on 2 October and concluded with the final on 7 October 2018. The entire tournament took place at Barabati Stadium in Cuttack.

The competition features teams from the Silver, Gold and Diamond competitions of the FAO League, the premier state level football league in Odisha. The top four teams from the Diamond League, top three from Silver League, and the winners of the Silver League qualify for the tournament.

== Teams ==
A total of 8 teams participated in the competition. Sunrise Club emerged as the champions whereas beating Rising Student's Club 2–1 in the final.

Main Competition
(8 teams)

Diamond League

- Odisha Police
- Rising Student's Club
- Sports Hostel
- Sunrise Club

Gold League

- Rising Star Club
- Rovers Club
- Young Utkal Club

Silver League

- Sunshine Club

=== Dates ===
On 9 May 2018, the Football Association of Odisha announced the schedule and full format of the tournament.

Phase	Round	Dates
Main Tournament	Quarter-finals	2 – 3 October 2018
Main Tournament	Semi-finals	5 October 2018
Main Tournament	Final	7 October 2018

== Quarter-finals ==
2 October 2018
13:30 IST

Sunrise	3–0	Sunshine
Md. Fayaz KF 28'; Dinesh Lakra 51'; Gurpreet Singh 59'	Report

Barabati Stadium, Cuttack

2 October 2018
15:30 IST

Rovers	1–0	Police
Arunangas Gupta 30'	Report

Barabati Stadium, Cuttack

3 October 2018
13:30 IST

Sports Hostel	w/o	Rising Star
	Report

Barabati Stadium, Cuttack

3 October 2018
15:30 IST

Rising Student's	4–1	Young Utkal
Raju Bisar 9'; Arbind Lakra 23'; Chandra Sekhar Behera 75'; Lakhai Murmu 87'	Report	Rakesh Sahoo 6'

Barabati Stadium, Cuttack

== Semi-finals ==
5 October 2018
13:30 IST

Sunrise	1–1 (a.e.t.)	Sports Hostel
Mukesh Bhoi	Report	Manjit Kissan
Penalties
	4–2

Barabati Stadium, Cuttack

5 October 2018
13:30 IST

Rising Student's	3–1	Rovers
Sheikh Farid 35', 41'; Arbind Lakra 43'	Report	Sumit Oram 83'

Barabati Stadium, Cuttack

== Final ==
The final was played on 7 October 2018 at the Barabati Stadium and Sunrise won the inaugural Super Cup by defeating Rising Student's in the final.

7 October 2018
15:30 IST

Sunrise	2–1	Rising Student's
Gurpreet Singh 11'; Md. Fayaz KF 70'	Report	Lakhai Murmu 12'

Barabati Stadium, Cuttack

== Goalscorers ==
2 goals

- (India) Arbind Lakra (Rising Student's)
- (India) Gurpreet Singh (Sunrise)
- (India) Lakhai Murmu (Rising Student's)
- (India) Md. Fayaz KF (Sunrise)
- (India) Sheikh Farid (Rising Student's)

1 goal

- (India) Arunangas Gupta (Rovers)
- (India) Chandra Sekhar Behera (Rising Student's)
- (India) Raju Bisar (Rising Student's)
- (India) Dinesh Lakra (Sunrise)
- (India) Manjit Kissan (Sports Hostel)
- (India) Mukesh Bhoi (Sunrise)
- (India) Rakesh Sahoo (Young Utkal)
- (India) Sumit Oram (Rovers)

== See also ==
- 2018 FAO League
- FAO League
- FAO Super Cup
- FAO Women's League
- Football Association of Odisha
- Odisha football team
- Odisha women's football team
