= Ramiah =

Ramiah is a surname. Notable people with the surname include:

- B. S. Ramiah (1905–1983), Indian journalist
- K. Ramiah (1892–1988), Indian politician
- Kailasa Venkata Ramiah (1926–1994), Indian academic
- Krishnaswami Ramiah (1892–1988), Indian geneticist and politician
