= Kalinga Cup =

- Organiser(s): Football Association of Odisha; Department of Sports & Youth Services, Govt. of Odisha
- Founded: 1962; 63 years ago
- Region: India
- Teams: 20
- Current champions: Army XI (2nd title)
- Most championships: Mohammedan (3 titles)

Kalinga Cup (also known as All India Kalinga Cup) is an annual association football tournament held in Odisha, India. It is organised by Football Association of Odisha and Department of Sports and Youth of Government of Odisha. The tournament was introduced in 1962 by then Odisha Chief Minister Biju Patnaik.

== Venue ==
The matches are held at Barabati Stadium, Cuttack, Odisha.

== Awards ==
Award name	Prize money
Champions	₹ 3,00,000
Runners-up	₹ 2,00,000

== Results ==
List of Kalinga Cup Finals
Year	Winners	Score	Runners-up	Ref.
1964	Mohammedan Sporting			
1991	Mohammedan Sporting (2)	2–1	Mohun Bagan	
1993	East Bengal	2–0	Mohun Bagan	
2005	Eveready Association	2–0	State Sports Hostel, Cuttack	
2006	Oil India			
2009	Amity United	5–4	Army XI	
2010	Army XI	1–1 (10–9 p)	(Nepal) Three Star Club	
2012	Mohammedan (3)	2–1	Vasco	
2013	Southern Samity	0–0 (4–2 p)	Air India	
2014	ONGC	2–1	Kalighat Milan Sangha	
2016	Army XI (2)	5–1	Bidanasi Club	
