= National Rice Research Institute =

Research institute in Cuttack, India

The National Rice Research Institute was established in 1966 under the Indian Council of Agricultural Research (ICAR) at Bidhyadharpur, Cuttack, India. It was given an experimental farm land of 60 hectares.

== Research ==
The institute performs research in various disciplines of rice research, including:

- Biochemistry
- Blue green algae
- Entomology
- Food technology
- Glycemic Index
- Nematology
- Plant breeding and genetics
- Plant pathology and mycology
- Plant Physiology

== Site ==
The site occupies approximately 250 acres (1.0 km^{2}). Many of the scientists are housed on the campus, which includes a co-operative store, a co-operative dairy, and a CGHS dispensary. There is also a hostel and in-transit accommodation.

== Organisation ==
The research institute is divided into various departments, each headed by a departmental head. After the implementation of the Gajendragadkar Commission report, working conditions (in terms of pay) have improved greatly for the research scientists.

== Notable staff ==
- Ex-Directors
  - Krishnaswami Ramiah – Founder director
  - R. H. Richharia
