= 2023 FAO League =

FAO League
- Season: 2023
- Dates: 5 July – 23 August
- Champions: Diamond League: Sunrise Club (6th title); Gold League: Rising Star Club; Silver League: Independent Club
- Relegated: Diamond League: Odisha Police; Gold League: Radha Gobinda Club; Silver League: Lalbag Club
- Matches played: 63
- Goals scored: 214 (3.4 per match)
- Top goalscorer: Diamond League: Dinabandhu Das (Young Utkal Club) (7 goals); Gold League: Bikash Chandra Padhiary (Rising Star Club) (6 goals)
- All statistics correct as of 23 August 2023.

The 2023 FAO League was the twelfth season of the FAO League, the top Odia professional football league, since its establishment in 2010. Sunrise Club and Radha Raman Club were the joint defending champions. FAO League is annually organised by the Football Association of Odisha (FAO), the official football governing body of Odisha, in association with Department of Sports & Youth Services (DSYS), Government of Odisha.

== Teams ==
=== Diamond ===
- Bidanasi Club
- Odisha Police
- Radha Raman Club
- Rising Student Club
- Rovers Athletic Club
- Sports Odisha
- Sunrise Club
- Young Utkal Club

=== Gold ===
- Chand Club
- East Coast Railway
- Kishore Club
- Jay Durga Club
- Rising Star Club
- Mangala Club
- Radha Gobinda Club

=== Silver ===
==== Silver A ====
- Azad Hind Club
- Lalbag Club
- Sunshine Club
- Town Club

==== Silver B ====
- Chauliaganj Club
- Eleven Gun Club
- Independent Club
- Royal Club

== Venue ==
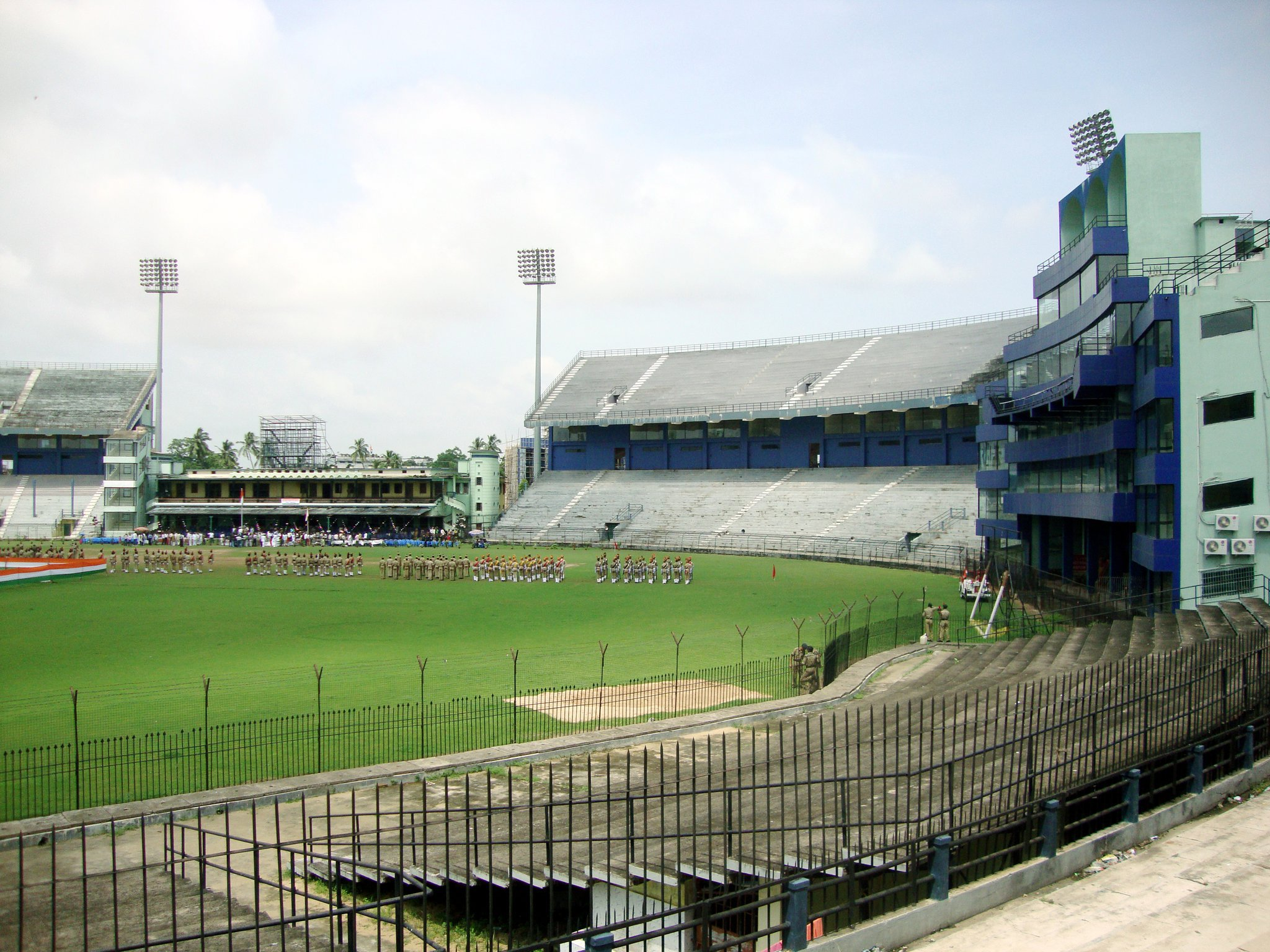
Barabati Stadium in Cuttack, Odisha

== League stage ==
=== Diamond League ===
Pos	Team	Pld	W	D	L	GF	GA	GD	Pts	Qualification
1	Sunrise Club (C)	7	6	1	0	16	3	+13	19	Qualification to 2023 FAO Super Cup, and eligible for 2023–24 I-League 3
2	Sports Odisha	7	4	2	1	14	11	+3	14	Qualification to 2023 FAO Super Cup, and eligible for 2023–24 I-League 3
3	Radha Raman Club	7	4	1	2	13	6	+7	13	Qualification to 2023 FAO Super Cup
4	Young Utkal Club	7	2	4	1	10	9	+1	10	Qualification to 2023 FAO Super Cup
5	Bidanasi Club	7	2	1	4	7	7	0	7	
6	Rising Student Club	7	2	0	5	11	15	−4	6	
7	Rovers Athletic Club	7	1	2	4	9	18	−9	5	
8	Odisha Police (R)	7	1	1	5	10	21	−11	4	Relegation to 2024 FAO Gold League

Source: Orisports
Rules for classification: 1) points; 2) head-to-head points; 3) head-to-head goal difference; 4) goal difference; 5) number of goals scored; 6) drawing of lots
(C) Champions; (R) Relegated

=== Gold League ===
Pos	Team	Pld	W	D	L	GF	GA	GD	Pts	Qualification
1	Rising Star Club (C)	6	5	1	0	18	5	+13	16	Promotion to 2024 FAO Diamond League, Qualification to 2023 FAO Super Cup
2	Kishore Club	6	4	2	0	14	8	+6	14	Qualification to 2023 FAO Super Cup
3	Jay Durga Club	6	3	2	1	11	9	+2	11	Qualification to 2023 FAO Super Cup
4	Chand Club	6	1	3	2	10	13	−3	6	
5	Mangala Club	6	1	1	4	9	18	−9	4	
6	East Coast Railway	6	1	2	3	5	9	−4	5	
7	Radha Gobinda Club (R)	6	0	1	5	5	10	−5	1	Relegation to 2024 FAO Silver League

Source: Orisports
Rules for classification: 1) points; 2) head-to-head points; 3) head-to-head goal difference; 4) goal difference; 5) number of goals scored; 6) drawing of lots
(C) Champions; (R) Relegated

=== Silver League ===
==== Group stage ====
===== Group A =====
Pos	Team	Pld	W	D	L	GF	GA	GD	Pts	Qualification
1	Sunshine Club	3	3	0	0	10	1	+9	9	Advance to Promotion Play-off
2	Town Club	3	1	1	1	9	8	+1	4	
3	Azad Hind Club	3	1	0	2	5	13	−8	3	
4	Lalbag Club	3	0	1	2	4	6	−2	1	Advance to Relegation Play-off

Source: Orisports
Rules for classification: 1) points; 2) head-to-head points; 3) head-to-head goal difference; 4) goal difference; 5) number of goals scored; 6) drawing of lots

===== Group B =====
Pos	Team	Pld	W	D	L	GF	GA	GD	Pts	Qualification
1	Independent Club	3	2	1	0	10	1	+9	7	Advance to Promotion Play-off
2	Royal Club	3	1	1	1	4	5	−1	4	
3	Chauliaganj Club	3	1	1	1	4	9	−5	4	
4	Eleven Gun Club	3	0	1	2	0	3	−3	1	Advance to Relegation Play-off

Source: Orisports
Rules for classification: 1) points; 2) head-to-head points; 3) head-to-head goal difference; 4) goal difference; 5) number of goals scored; 6) drawing of lots

==== Promotion Play-off ====
23 August 2023	Sunshine Club	0–4	Independent Club	Barabati Stadium, Cuttack
17:30 UTC+5:30		Report	Prakash Naik 5', 30'; Chandan Nayak 64', 74'	Referee: Asirbad Kanungo

==== Relegation Play-off ====
9 August 2023	Lalbag Club	1–1 (4–6 p)	Eleven Gun Club	Barabati Stadium, Cuttack
	Biswabhaban Das 88'	Report	Babul Singh 54'

== Statistics ==
=== Scoring ===
As of 2 August 2023

==== Diamond League ====
Rank	Player	Club	Goals
Diamond
1	Dinabandhu Das	Young Utkal Club	7
2	Francis Lakra	Rising Student Club	6
3	Raisen Tudu	Sports Odisha	5
3	Selwyn Frazier Miranda	Sunrise Club	5
4	Anand Soreng	Odisha Police	4
5	Bholeshankar Majhi	Odisha Police	3
5	Bijay Behera	Odisha Police	3
5	Finto	Sunrise Club	3
5	Rajesh Nayak	Bidanasi Club	3
5	Ronik Majhi	Sports Odisha	3
5	Samir Kerketta	Sunrise Club	3
5	Tophan Nayak	Radha Raman Club	3
6	Anand Oram	Rising Student Club	2
6	Bapuni Bindhani	Young Utkal Club	2
6	Chandra Muduli	Rovers Athletic Club	2
6	D. Sanjay	Sports Odisha	2
6	Fagu Hembram	Radha Raman Club	2
6	Jamir Oram	Sunrise Club	2
6	Kartik Hantal	Rovers Athletic Club	2
6	Papu Majhi	Radha Raman Club	2
6	Pintu Samal	Sports Odisha	2
6	Sanjit Khora	Rovers Athletic Club	2
6	Sourav Ranjan Hanuman	Radha Raman Club	2
7	Adwin Tirkey	Rising Student Club	1
7	Arpan Lakra	Sunrise Club	1
7	Artatrana Samal	Young Utkal Club	1
7	Binay Kisam	Radha Raman Club	1
7	D. Srinath	Radha Raman Club	1
7	Dipin A.	Bidanasi Club	1
7	Jagannath Tudu	Sports Odisha	1
7	Manoj Swamy Kannan	Sunrise Club	1
7	Prasanta Srihari	Sports Odisha	1
7	Prayas Panda	Bidanasi Club	1
7	Rahul Mukhi	Rovers Athletic Club	1
7	Rajaganapathy K.	Sunrise Club	1
7	Rakesh Oram	Rising Student Club	1
7	Riswan Shoukath	Bidanasi Club	1
7	Robert Usham	Radha Raman Club	1
7	Sunil Khilla	Rovers Athletic Club	1
7	Sunil Munda	Rovers Athletic Club	1
7	Wangden Lama	Bidanasi Club	1

==== Gold League ====
Rank	Player	Club	Goals
Gold
1	Bikash Chandra Padhiary	Rising Star Club	6
2	Gopal Oram	Chand Club	5
2	Satyaprakash Pradhan	Mangala Club	5
3	Dashmath Murmu	Kishore Club	4
3	Sanjit Panna	East Coast Railway	4
4	Abhinash Munda	Chand Club	3
4	Bhabagrahi Padhiary	Jay Durga Club	3
4	Hari Kathayat	Rising Star Club	3
4	Prabhat Dansena	Kishore Club	3
4	Roshan Panna	Jay Durga Club	3
5	Abhishek Kerketta	Jay Durga Club	2
5	Abinash Muduli	Rising Star Club	2
5	Bibek Prasad Bag	Kishore Club	2
5	Bijay Singh	Rising Star Club	2
5	Jitu Muduli	Rising Star Club	2
6	Amar Lakra	Kishore Club	1
6	Ankit Behera	Kishore Club	1
6	Arjun Samantray	Chand Club	1
6	Ashanur Mallick	Radha Gobinda Club	1
6	Bighneswar Bhoi	Mangala Club	1
6	Deepak Biswal	Mangala Club	1
6	Gokul Oram	East Coast Railway	1
6	Jagadish Oram	Kishore Club	1
6	Janmo Xess	Jay Durga Club	1
6	Krishna Haripal	Kishore Club	1
6	Kshetrimayum Somokanta Singh	Kishore Club	1
6	Madhu Jani	Rising Star Club	1
6	Malaya Nayak	Mangala Club	1
6	Mrinmay Mondal	Radha Raman Club	1
6	Prakash Bhoi	Kishore Club	1
6	Rakesh Kumar Jena	Mangala Club	1
6	Romi Oram	Chand Club	1
6	Satender Oraon	Rising Star Club	1
6	Shaktiraj Kumura	Radha Gobinda Club	1
6	Sayed Manzar Ali	Rising Star Club	1
6	Sheikh Nawazish Noor	Jay Durga Club	1
6	Tushar Kant Nag	Kishore Club	1
6	Uttam Sil	Jay Durga Club	1

==== Silver League ====
Rank	Player	Club	Goals
Silver
1	Trinath Nayak	Royal Club	2
2	Abhimanyu Mahakud	Chauliaganj Club	1
2	Ajay Majhi	Sunshine Club	1
2	Abhinash Samal	Sunshine Club	1
2	Mohati Samal	Sunshine Club	1
2	Shyam Sundar Soren	Chauliaganj Club	1

==== Own Goals ====
Player	Club	Match Result	Date
Diamond League
Laxman Gadnayak	Rovers Athletic Club	Radha Raman Club 5-2 Rovers AC	20 July 2023
Pintu Samal	Rising Student Club	Sports Odisha 3-2 Rising Student Club	22 July 2023
