= Krishnaswami Ramiah =

Indian agricultural scientist (1892–1988)

Krishnaswamy Ramiah
- Born: 15 April 1892; Kizhakarai, Ramnad district, Madras Presidency, British Raj (now Ramanathapuram district, Tamil Nadu, India)
- Died: 3 August 1988 (aged 96); Bengaluru, Karnataka, India
- Occupation: Agricultural scientist
- Known for: Rice genetics
- Spouse: Janaki Ammal (3 Aug 1902 – 15 March 1985)
- Children: 7
- Awards: 1938: MBE; 1961:ICAR International Rice Year Medal; 1957:Padma Shri; 1969:INSA Sunder Lal Hora Medal; 1970:Padma Bhushan

Krishnaswamy Ramiah MBE (15 April 1892 – 3 August 1988) was an Indian agricultural scientist, geneticist, parliamentarian and the founder director of Central Rice Research Institute, Cuttack, credited with introducing systematic hybridisation programmes in rice breeding in India. The Government of India honoured him in 1957, with the award of Padma Shri, the fourth-highest Indian civilian award for his services to the nation and followed it up with the third-highest civilian honour of the Padma Bhushan in 1970.

== Biography ==
Ramiah, born in 1892, started his career, in 1914, as a member of research staff at the Paddy Breeding Station in Coimbatore, Tamil Nadu. In three years time, by 1917, he produced new crossbreeds of rice though pure line selection and breed improvement. Later, he introduced systematic hybridisation programmes, known to be the first Indian scientist to pursue such a protocol in rice breeding. When the Government of India established the Central Rice Research Institute in 1946, Ramiah was selected to head the institution as its founder director and continued at his post when the institute was later brought under the Indian Council of Agricultural Research. During his tenure there, he also led the International Rice Commission, a Food and Agriculture Organization (FAO) initiative. He was reported to have contributed to the FAO sponsored Indo-Japonica Hybridization programme which yielded the nitrogen responsive rice varieties of Mahsuri, Malinja, ADT 27 and Circna, the first two released in Malaysia, the third in India and the last one, in Australia. He also evolved a number of varieties of rice which include GEB 24, ADT 3, CO 4 and CO 25. The GEB 24 variety is a progenitor for 83 rice varieties developed across countries.

Ramiah was one of the first scientists who advocated for standardisation of gene symbols for rice. Serving as the FAO expert based in Bangkok, he was involved with the rice breeding in many countries. He was known to have conducted advanced research on X-ray induced mutation of rice and established a gene bank for rice. He was the author of two books on the subject, Rice in Madras and Rice Breeding and Genetics.

The British government appointed Ramiah a Member of the Order of the British Empire (MBE) in the 1938 Birthday Honours list. After India's independence, the Government of India recognised his services by awarding him the fourth-highest civilian honour of Padma Shri in 1957 and the third-highest honour of the Padma Bhushan in 1970. The Centre for Environmental Science and Engineering of the Indian Institute of Technology Bombay has instituted Ramiah Memorial Lecture, an annual lecture event, in his honour. He died on 3 August 1988, survived by his five sons and two daughters and their families; his wife had predeceased him.

== See also ==
- Central Rice Research Institute
- Indian National Science Academy
- Indian Council of Agricultural Research
