= FAO Super Cup =

- Organiser(s): Football Association of Odisha (FAO)
- Founded: 2018; 8 years ago
- Region: Odisha
- Teams: 8 (2023)
- Current champions: Odisha Police (1st title)
- Most championships: Sunrise Club (2 titles)
- Broadcaster(s): FA Odisha; SportsKPI (YouTube, Facebook)
- 2026 FAO Super Cup

The FAO Super Cup (also known as the MGM FAO Super Cup for sponsorship reasons) is an annual knockout football competition in men's domestic football, based in Odisha, India. The inaugural edition of the Super Cup was played in 2018. The Super Cup is organised by and named after the Football Association of Odisha (FAO), the official football governing body of Odisha, India. Sunrise Club of Cuttack were the champions of the inaugural edition of the tournament, beating the Rising Students Club.

== History ==
In 2018, the Football Association of Odisha, in a total revamp, introduced the two new leagues to the footballing system of the state; annual knockout football competition in men's domestic football i.e. the FAO Super Cup and the Inter District Football Championship, which will be played among the districts of Odisha.

== League format ==
A three-tier system consisting of Diamond, Gold and Silver leagues; top four teams from the Diamond League, top three teams of Gold League, and the winners of Silver League play-off, would be promoted to the FAO Super cup. A total of eight teams compete in the tournament. In a total revamp of the league, the FAO Football league was converted to second highest level footballing league, as the premier state level football league was introduced by the Football Association of Odisha from 2018.

== Results ==
List of FAO Super Cup Finals
Year	Winners	Score	Runners-up
2018	Sunrise Club	2–1	Rising Students Club
2022	Rising Star Club	0–0 (2–0 p)	Bidanasi Club
2023	Sports Odisha	1–0	Sunrise Club
2024	Sunrise Club	1–0	Rovers Club
2026	Odisha Police	5–1	Young Utkal Club

=== Results by team ===
Club	Wins	First final won	Last final won	Runners-up	Last final lost	Total final appearances
Sunrise Club	2	2018	2024	1	2023	3
Sports Odisha	1	2023	2023			1
Rising Star Club	1	2022	2022			1
Odisha Police	1	2026	2026			1
Bidanasi Club	0			1	2022	1
Rising Students Club	0			1	2018	1
Rovers Club	0			1	2024	1
Young Utkal Club	0			1	2026	1

== See also ==
- FAO League
- Odisha Women's League
- Football Association of Odisha
- I-League
- Indian Super League
- Odisha football team
