= FAO League =

- Organising body: Football Association of Odisha (FAO)
- Founded: 2010; 16 years ago
- Country: India
- Divisions: 2 (FAO First Division, FAO Second Division)
- Number of clubs: 24 (total in all 3 groups)
- Level on pyramid: 5–8
- Promotion to: I-League 3
- Relegation to: Various
- Domestic cup: Kalinga Cup
- League cup: FAO Super Cup
- Current champions: Sunrise Club (8th title) (2026–27)
- Most championships: Sunrise Club (8 titles)
- Broadcaster(s): FA Odisha; SportsKPI (online streaming)

The Football Association of Odisha League, (also known as the MGM FAO League for sponsorship reasons) often abbreviated to the FAO League, is the top state football league of the Indian state of Odisha, organised by Football Association of Odisha (FAO) in association with Department of Sports & Youth Services (DSYS), Government of Odisha.

== History ==
The major domestic league in the state held at Cuttack was known as Cuttack Football League until 2010 when FAO decided to restructure the league as FAO league. It continues as the top-tier competition for Cuttack-based football clubs.

The FAO League was brought up as Siddhartha Odisha First Division League in 2010 as Odisha's premier level football league. FAO introduced the league system to provide the footballing talents of the state a platform to showcase their abilities. The league system continued with the same format for seven years, until its revamp in 2018. Since the inception of the FAO League, a total of five clubs have been crowned champions. Sunrise have won the most titles in league history, being crowned champions four times. Odisha Police have won the league twice whereas East Coast Railway, Sports Odisha, Radha Gobinda Club, and Radha Raman Club have each won it once.

In a total competition revamp, FAO League was converted to a threeptier first division highest level footballing league of the state in 2018. The First Division League currently has three tiers, Diamond, Gold and Silver leagues, followed by the Second Division.

== League structure ==
FAO League
| Tier | Division |
|---|---|
| I _{(5 on Indian Football pyramid)} | FAO Diamond League _{↑promote (to I-League 3) ↓relegate} |
| II _{(6 on Indian Football pyramid)} | FAO Gold League _{↑promote ↓relegate} |
| III _{(7 on Indian Football pyramid)} | FAO Silver League _{↑promote ↓relegate} |
| IV _{(8 on Indian Football pyramid)} | FAO Second Division League _{↑promote} |

== Venues ==
Venues of the FAO Football League

=== Bhubaneswar ===
- Kalinga Stadium

=== Cuttack ===
- Barabati Stadium
- Odisha Police Ground
- Satyabrata Stadium

== Diamond League ==
FAO Diamond League
- Organising body: Football Association of Odisha (FAO)
- Founded: 2010; 16 years ago
- Country: India
- Number of clubs: 8
- Level on pyramid: 4
- Promotion to: I-League 3
- Relegation to: FAO Gold League
- Domestic cup: Kalinga Cup
- League cup: FAO Super Cup
- Current champions: Sunrise Club (8th title)
- Most championships: Sunrise Club (8 titles)

=== 2026–27 clubs ===
- Bidanasi Club
- Kishore Club
- Radha Raman Club
- Rising Star Club
- Rising Student Club
- Rovers Club
- Sports Odisha
- Sunrise Club

=== Champions ===
| Season | Champion | Runner–up |
|---|---|---|
| 2010 | East Coast Railway | Rising Student's Club |
| 2011 | Odisha Police | Radha Gobinda Club |
| 2012 | Odisha Police | Jobra Durga Club |
| 2013 | Radha Gobinda Club | Jobra Durga Club |
| 2014 | Sunrise Club | East Coast Railway |
| 2015 | Sunrise Club | Rising Student's Club |
| 2016 | Sunrise Club | East Coast Railway |
| 2017 | Radha Raman Club | Sunrise Club |
| 2018 | Sunrise Club | Odisha Police |
| 2019 | Sports Odisha | Rising Students Club |
| 2022 | Sunrise Club, Radha Raman Club (joint-champions) | |
| 2023 | Sunrise Club | Sports Odisha |
| 2024 | Sunrise Club | Rovers Club |
| 2026–27 | Sunrise Club | Rovers Club |

=== Championships by club ===
| Club | Titles | Runners-up | Winning seasons |
|---|---|---|---|
| Sunrise Club | 8 | 1 | 2014, 2015, 2016, 2018, 2022, 2023, 2024, 2026–27 |
| Odisha Police | 2 | 1 | 2011, 2012 |
| Radha Raman Club | 2 | 0 | 2017, 2022 |
| East Coast Railway | 1 | 2 | 2010 |
| Radha Gobinda Club | 1 | 1 | 2013 |
| Sports Odisha | 1 | 1 | 2019 |
| Rising Student Club | 0 | 3 | — |
| Jobra Durga Club | 0 | 2 | — |

== Gold League ==
FAO Gold League
- Organising body: Football Association of Odisha (FAO)
- Country: India
- Number of clubs: 7
- Level on pyramid: 5
- Promotion to: FAO Diamond League
- Relegation to: FAO Silver League
- League cup: FAO Super Cup

=== 2026–27 clubs ===
- Chand Club
- Independent Club
- Jay Durga Club
- JR Gallant Club
- Mangala Club
- Odisha Police
- Young Utkal Club

=== Champions ===
| Season | Champion | Runner-up |
|---|---|---|
| 2018 | FAO XI | Eleven Gun Club |
| 2019 | Rovers Club | Rising Star Club |
| 2022 | Bidanasi Club | Rising Star Club |
| 2023 | Rising Star Club | Kishore Club |
| 2024 | Kishore Club | Mangala Club |
| 2026–27 | Mangala Club | Young Utkal Club |

== Silver League ==
FAO Silver League
- Organising body: Football Association of Odisha (FAO)
- Country: India
- Number of clubs: 8
- Level on pyramid: 6
- Promotion to: FAO Gold League
- Relegation to: FAO League 2nd Division
- League cup: FAO Super Cup

=== 2026–27 clubs ===
- Chauliaganj Club
- Eleven Gun Club
- Radha Gobinda Club
- Sunshine Club
- Town Club
- YAFC Choudwar

=== Champions ===
| Season | Champion | Runner–up |
|---|---|---|
| 2018 | Sunshine Club | SAI-STC |
| 2019 | SAI-STC | Club-n-Club |
| 2022 | Kishore Club | Town Club |
| 2023 | Independent Club | Sunshine Club |
| 2024 | Junior Gallant Club | Chauliaganj Club |
| 2026–27 | Eleven Gun Club | Radha Gobinda Club |

== FAO Second Division League ==
=== 2026–27 clubs ===
- Barabati United Club
- Rohit FA
- LOC
- CRRI
- Odisha Government Press (OGP)
- Morning FC, CDAA, Bidanasi
- Tarzan Club
- Azad Hind Club
- Lalbag Club
- Urban Adventure FC
- State Bank SC
- Uday Club
- Eleven Bright Star
- Nita Football Academy
- Sartol FC

| Season | Champion | Runners-up |
|---|---|---|
| 2010 | Kishore Club | Town Club |
| 2011 | Yuva Vandhu Cultural Group (YVCG) | Lalbagh Club |
| 2012 | Town Club | Royal Club |
| 2013 | Jay Bharat Cultural Club | Uday Club |
| 2014 | Lalbagh Club | Royal Club |
| 2016 | Club 'N' Club | Royal Club |
| 2017 | Chauliaganj Club | Royal Club |
| 2022 | Eleven Gun Club | Uday Club |
| 2023 | Junior Gallant Club | YAFC Choudwar Club |
| 2024 | YAFC Choudwar Club | Uday Club |
| 2026 | Barabati United Club | OGP |

== See also ==
- I-League 3
- Football in India
