= Sports Odisha =

Indian multisports club based in Bhubaneswar, Odisha

- Full name: Sports Odisha
- Founded: 2011; 14 years ago
- Ground: Kalinga Stadium; Bhubaneswar, Odisha
- Capacity: 15,000
- Owner(s): Department of Sports and Youth Services (DSYS), Government of Odisha
- League: I-League 3 FAO League; Odisha Women's League

Sports Odisha is an Indian institutional multisports club based in Bhubaneswar, Odisha. It is owned by Government of Odisha and most of the club's players are selected from the Odisha State Sports Hostel scheme, due to which the team also competes as Odisha Sports Hostel.

The men's team competes in the FAO League at the state tier and in the 2023–24 season qualified for I-League 3, the fourth-tier men's professional football league in India. The women's team participated in the Indian Women's League and the Odisha Women's League at the state level. Sports Odisha have also appeared at the Futsal Club Championship.

== Players (men's) ==
As of 12 October 2023

Note: Flags indicate national team as defined under FIFA eligibility rules; some limited exceptions apply. Players may hold more than one non-FIFA nationality.

No.	Pos.	Nation	Player
1		IND	Sanjay Hembram
2		IND	Pintu Samal
3		IND	Srinath D.
4		IND	Rakesh Oram (captain)
5		IND	Mohan Majhi
6		IND	Rahul Mukhi
7		IND	Arpan Lakra
8		IND	Prasanta Srihari
9		IND	Raisen Tudu
10		IND	Kartik Hantal
11		IND	Dinabandhu Das
12		IND	Alok Kumar Das
14		IND	Anand Oram
15		IND	Chandrakant Das
16		IND	Chandra Mohan Murmu

No.	Pos.	Nation	Player
17		IND	D. Sanjay
18		IND	Parao Tudu
19		IND	Fagu Hembram
20		IND	Chandra Muduli
21		IND	Siddhanta Padhan
22		IND	Arbin Lakra
23		IND	Indra Kujur
24		IND	Dasarath Hembram
25		IND	Jagannath Tudu
26		IND	Ganesh Naik
27		IND	Lesson Kumar Munda
28		IND	Prempiyush Bagh
29		IND	Indra Oram
30		IND	Abhinash Kishan
31		IND	Rabi Deulapadia

== Players (women's) ==
As of 6 December 2023

Note: Flags indicate national team as defined under FIFA eligibility rules; some limited exceptions apply. Players may hold more than one non-FIFA nationality.

No.	Pos.	Nation	Player
3	DF	IND	Ratna Halder
6	MF	IND	Sumitra Hembram
10	FW	IND	Manisha Naik
12	DF	IND	Subasini Saha
13	DF	IND	Sangeeta Das
14	DF	IND	Niketa Bishi
15	MF	IND	Janhabi Kishan
16	MF	IND	Premsila Lugun
17	FW	IND	Subhadra Sahoo
18	DF	IND	Susmita Tanty

No.	Pos.	Nation	Player
19	DF	IND	Ambruta Nayak
20	MF	IND	Bharati Das
23	MF	IND	Pratima Oram
24	FW	IND	Deepa Nayak
25	DF	IND	Pratima Nayak
27	DF	IND	Salege Majhi
31	GK	IND	Spandita Das
32	DF	IND	Shibani Mundari
77	DF	IND	Kamini Munda

== Honours ==
=== Domestic (men's) ===
- FAO League
  - Champions (1): 2019
  - Runners-up (1): 2023
- FAO Super Cup
  - Champions (1): 2023
- Kalinga Cup
  - Runners-up (1): 2005

=== Domestic (women's) ===
- Odisha Women's League
  - Runners-up (4): 2015, 2017, 2021–22, 2024–25

=== Recognitions ===
- IWL Roll of Honours
  - Best Match Organisation (1): 2023–24
