= Football Association of Odisha =

State governing body of Football in Odisha

- Sport: Football
- Jurisdiction: Odisha
- Membership: 33 district associations
- Abbreviation: FAO
- Founded: 1949 (as Orissa Football Association); 2010; 16 years ago (as Football Association of Orissa)
- Affiliation: All India Football Federation (AIFF)
- Headquarters: Cuttack
- President: Tankadhar Tripathy
- Secretary: Asirbad Behera

The Football Association of Odisha (FAO) is the governing body of football in the state of Odisha, India. The Odisha football team and Odisha women's football team are administered by the Football Association of Odisha. The FAO is affiliated with the All India Football Federation, the national administrating body for football in India.

== History ==
It was formed in 1949 and became an independent registered body in 1961. The organisation was renamed after the committee of Orissa Football Association was dissolved due to litigation in 2010.

== Teams ==
=== State teams ===
Team	Head coach	Team manager	Tournament
Odisha Men	Akshay Das	Gangadhar Behera	Santosh Trophy
Odisha Women	Crispin Chettri	Gitanjali Khuntia	Senior Women's NFC

=== State youth teams ===
Team	Head coach	Tournament
Odisha Junior Men (U-20)		Swami Vivekananda NFC (U -20)
Odisha Junior Men (U-15)	Suraj Thapa	B.C. Roy Trophy
Odisha Junior Women (U-19)	Suraj Thapa	Junior Girl's NFC
Odisha Sub-Junior Boys (U-13)	Nipendra Kumar Das	Mir Iqbal Hussain Trophy
Odisha Sub-Junior Girls (U-17)	Shaik Manzoor	Sub-Junior Girl's NFC

== Affiliated district associations ==
The 33 district associations of Odisha affiliated with the Football Association of Odisha.

No.	Association	District/Region
1	Angul District Athletic Association	Angul
2	Balangir District Athletic Association	Balangir
3	Balasore District Athletic Association	Balasore
4	Bargarh District Athletic Association	Bargarh
5	Bhadrak District Athletic Association	Bhadrak
6	Bhubaneswar Athletic Association	Bhubaneswar (Khordha)
7	Boudh District Athletic Association	Boudh
8	Cuttack District Athletic Association	Cuttack
9	Debagarh District Athletic Association	Debagarh
10	Dhenkanal District Athletic Association	Dhenkanal
11	Gajapati District Athletic Association	Gajapati
12	Ganjam District Athletic Association	Ganjam
13	Jagatsinghpur District Athletic Association	Jagatsinghpur
14	Jajpur District Athletic Association	Jajpur
15	Jharsuguda District Athletic Association	Jharsuguda
16	Kalahandi District Athletic Association	Kalahandi
17	Kendrapara District Athletic Association	Kendrapara
18	Keonjhar District Athletic Association	Kendujhar
19	Khordha District Athletic Association	Khordha
20	Koraput District Athletic Association	Koraput
21	Malkangiri District Athletic Association	Malkangiri
22	Mayurbhanj District Athletic Association	Mayurbhanj
23	Nabarangpur District Athletic Association	Nabarangpur
24	Nayagarh District Athletic Association	Nayagarh
25	Nuapada District Athletic Association	Nuapada
26	Paradeep Port Trust	Paradeep (Jagatsinghpur)
27	Phulbani District Athletic Association	Kandhamal
28	Puri District Athletic Association	Puri
29	Rayagada District Athletic Association	Rayagada
30	Rourkela Steel Plant	Rourkela (Sundargarh)
31	Sambalpur District Athletic Association	Sambalpur
32	Subarnapur District Athletic Association	Subarnapur
33	Sundargarh District Athletic Association	Sundargarh

== Competitions ==
=== District level ===
==== Men's ====
- Sahani Cup (Senior Inter-District Football Championship)

==== Women's ====
- PC Behera Trophy (Senior Women Inter-District Football Championship)

=== Club level ===
==== Men's ====
- FAO League
- FAO Super Cup
- Kalinga Cup

==== Women's ====
- Odisha Women's League

==== Youth ====
- FAO Youth League (U15 and U13)

==== Futsal ====
- FAO Inter Club Futsal Championship

== Odisha Football League pyramid ==
FAO League
Tier	Division
I _{(Level 5 on Indian Football pyramid)}	FAO Diamond League _{↑promote (to I-League 3) ↓relegate}
II _{(Level 6 on Indian Football pyramid)}	FAO Gold League _{↑promote ↓relegate}
III _{(Level 7 on Indian Football pyramid)}	FAO Silver League _{↑promote ↓relegate}
IV _{(Level 8 on Indian Football pyramid)}	FAO Second Division League _{↑promote}

== Evolution ==
Years		1949	1962– 2010	2010–2011	2011–2016	2016-2018	2018–present
Level		1949	1962– 2010	2010–2011	2011–2016	2016-2018	2018–present
Men's
State leagues	1	Formation of Football Association of Odisha (FAO)	None	FAO First Division League			FAO Diamond League
State leagues	2	Formation of Football Association of Odisha (FAO)	None	FAO Second Division League			FAO Gold League
State leagues	3	Formation of Football Association of Odisha (FAO)	None				FAO Silver League
State leagues	4	Formation of Football Association of Odisha (FAO)	None				FAO Second Division League
Cup competitions			Kalinga Cup			Not held	
Cup competitions			None			FAO Super Cup	
Women's
State leagues	1		None		Odisha Women's League		

== Honours ==
=== Men ===
- B. C. Roy Trophy (Junior National Football Championship)

(gold) Winners (1): 1968–69
(silver) Runners-up (3): 1961–62, 1976–77, 2024–25

- Mir Iqbal Hussain Trophy (Sub-Junior National Football Championship)

(gold) Winners (1): 2018–19
(silver) Runners-up (4): 1993–94, 2000–01, 2012–13, 2015–16

=== Women ===
- Senior Women's National Football Championship

(gold) Winners (1): 2010–11
(silver) Runners-up (6): 2000–01, 2001–02, 2007–08, 2009–10, 2013–14, 2018–19

- National Games

(gold) Gold medal (3): 2007, 2011, 2023
(silver) Silver medal (2): 2015, 2022
(bronze) Bronze medal (1): 2002

- Junior Girl's National Football Championship

(silver) Runners-up (8): 2002–03, 2005–06, 2007–08, 2008–09, 2011–12, 2013–14, 2015–16, 2017–18

- Sub–Junior Girl's National Football Championship

(gold) Winners (1): 2006–07
(silver) Runners-up (7): 2003–04, 2004–05, 2007–08, 2008–09, 2009–10, 2010–11, 2018–19

=== Federation awards ===
- 2023–24 Best Member Association for Hosting AIFF Competitions
- 2023–24 AIFF Special Award for Hosting Various AIFF Events
- 2015 AIFF Award for Best Grassroots Programme
- 2017–18 AIFF's FIFA Development Project Rank #10

== Management ==
Management of FAO for the term 2024–28:

Position	Office-bearer
President	Tankadhar Tripathy
Vice-president(s)	Bijay Das; Padma Lochan Lenka; Dilip Kumar Sahoo; Rabi Narayan Panda; Asit Baran Pati; Mohammad Shahid Jabbar; Sahadev Rout; Birendra Kumar Behera
Working president	Srikara Mishra
Secretary	Asirbad Behera
Joint secretary(s)	Avijit Paul; Biswa Ranjan Gharei; Bijay Kumar Das
Treasurer	Bhakta Ballav Das

=== AIFF committee members ===
Committee	Member
Executive committee	(India) Avijit Paul
Technical committee	(India) Pinky Bompal Magar

== Accredited academies ==
Team	Manager	AIFF Academy Rating
Sports Odisha	Shuvendu Panda	
FAO Academy	Sanjeev Patsani	

== See also ==
- List of Indian state football associations
- Football in India
