= Barabati Stadium =

Multi-purpose international cricket stadium in Cuttack, Odisha, India

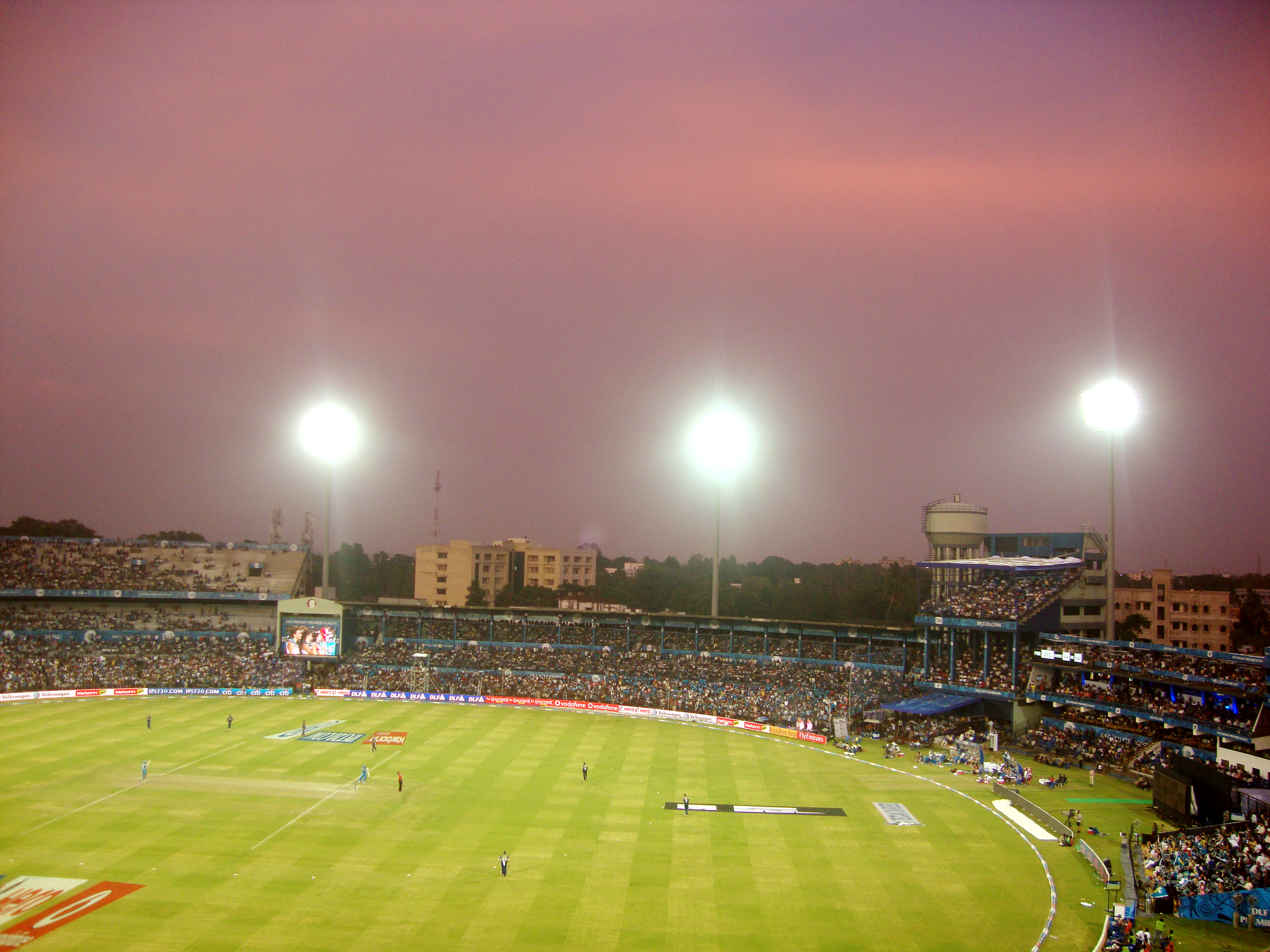
- The Barabati Stadium in Cuttack
- Interactive map of Barabati Stadium
- Address: Stadium Road, Cuttack, India
- Location: Stadium Road, Cuttack, Odisha
- Coordinates: 20°28′52″N 85°52′7″E
- Owner: Government of Odisha; Odisha Olympic Association
- Operator: Odisha Cricket Association; Football Association of Odisha
- Capacity: 45,000

Construction
- Opened: 1958

Tenants
- India national cricket team India women's national cricket team Odisha cricket team (1958–present); Odisha women's cricket team (1958–present); Deccan Chargers (2010–2012); Kings XI Punjab (2014); Kolkata Knight Riders (2014); Odisha football team (1958–present); Odisha women's football team (1958–present)

Ground information
- Location: Stadium Road, Cuttack, Odisha, India
- Establishment: 1958
- End names
- Mahanadi River End; Kathajodi River End

International information
- First men's Test: 4–7 January 1987: India v Sri Lanka
- Last men's Test: 8–12 November 1995: India v New Zealand
- First men's ODI: 27 January 1982: India v England
- Last men's ODI: 9 February 2025: India v England
- First men's T20I: 5 October 2015: India v South Africa
- Last men's T20I: 9 December 2025: India v South Africa
- Only women's Test: 7–11 March 1985: India v New Zealand
- First women's ODI: 1 February 2013: Australia v Pakistan
- Last women's ODI: 15 February 2013: South Africa v Sri Lanka
- As of 12 June 2022; Source: ESPNcricinfo

The Barabati Stadium is an Indian sports stadium used mostly for cricket and association football, and also sometimes for concerts and field hockey, located in Cuttack, Odisha. It is a regular venue for international cricket and is the home ground of Odisha cricket team. It is the seventeenth largest cricket stadium in the world and twelfth largest cricket stadium in India in terms of seating capacity. The stadium is owned and operated by the Odisha Olympic Association. It is also used for association football. It hosts Santosh Trophy national football tournament and the state's Odisha First Division League football matches. The Barabati Stadium is one of the older grounds in India, having hosted several touring sides – including the MCC, the West Indies team and the Australians – before it hosted its first international cricket match. It hosted only the third one-day international in this country, in January 1982, when India put it across England by five wickets to lift the series 2–1. It hosted its first ever Test match five years later where India played hosts to Sri Lanka. Though it is not a regular Test venue, it continues to host One-Day Internationals regularly. It also hosted the 2013 Women's Cricket World Cup. This ground is also known for its good playing conditions.

The cricket and football venue is equipped with floodlights for day-and-night games and is a regular venue for ODI matches. It was an adopted home venue for former Indian Premier League franchise Deccan Chargers, Kings Xi Punjab, and Kolkata Knight Riders. Barabati Stadium has successfully served as the venue for both Indian Premier League and the now defunct Odisha Premier League. It also hosted Senior Women's T20 Challenger Trophy 2020 in January 2020.

== History and development ==
The Barabati Stadium in Cuttack hosted only the third One Day International in the country, in January 1982, when India beat England by five wickets to win the series 2–1. In the first Test match here, five seasons later, the Sri Lankans were greeted with an underprepared wicket affording vastly unpredictable bounce. Dilip Vengsarkar, then at the height of his career, made his highest Test score of 166, his fourth century in eight Tests, when no other batsman on either side crossed 60. India won by an innings and 67 runs. Kapil Dev bagged his 300th Test victim, bowling Rumesh Ratnayake with a ball that failed to sit up.

The only other Test match here, against New Zealand in 1995–96, was badly affected by rain, affording less than 180 overs of playing time. Narendra Hirwani, on a comeback trail, took 6 for 59 in New Zealand's only innings, the best bowling figures here.

Though it is not one of the regular Test venues anymore, it continues to enjoy the status of international venue and hosts One-Day Internationals regularly. India have won one of the two Test matches played here, and have an 11–4 win–loss record in ODIs.

=== Indoor Hall ===
In 2012, OCA named the indoor cricket hall at Barabati Stadium after Sachin Tendulkar.

== International cricket centuries ==
=== Key ===
- * denotes that the batsman was not out.
- Inns. denotes the number of the innings in the match.
- Balls denotes the number of balls faced in an innings.
- NR denotes that the number of balls was not recorded.
- Parentheses next to the player's score denotes his century number at the Feroz Shah Kotla.
- The column title Date refers to the date the match started.
- The column title Result refers to match result

=== Test centuries ===
The following table summarises the Test centuries scored at the Barabati Stadium.

No.	Score	Player	Team	Balls	Inns.	Opposing team	Date	Result
1	166	Dilip Vengsarkar	India	279	1	Sri Lanka	4 January 1987	Won

=== One Day Centuries ===
The following table summarises the One Day centuries scored at the Barabati Stadium.

No.	Score	Player	Team	Balls	Inns.	Opposing team	Date	Result
1	102	Ravi Shastri	India	142	1	England	27 December 1984	Lost
2	104	Ajay Jadeja	India	126	2	West Indies	9 November 1994	Won
3	127*	Sachin Tendulkar	India	138	2	Kenya	18 February 1996	Won
4	153*	Mohammad Azharuddin	India	150	1	Zimbabwe	9 April 1998	Won
5	116*	Ajay Jadeja	India	121	1	Zimbabwe	9 April 1998	Won
6	102	Grant Flower	Zimbabwe	118	2	India	9 April 1998	Lost
7	111*	Kevin Pietersen	England	128	1	India	26 November 2008	Lost
8	111	Ajinkya Rahane	India	108	1	Sri Lanka	2 November 2014	Won
9	113	Shikhar Dhawan	India	107	1	Sri Lanka	2 November 2014	Won
10	150	Yuvraj Singh	India	127	1	England	19 January 2017	Won
11	134	MS Dhoni	India	122	1	England	19 January 2017	Won
12	102	Eoin Morgan	England	81	2	India	19 January 2017	Lost
13	119	Rohit Sharma	India	90	2	England	9 February 2025	Won

== International cricket five-wicket hauls ==
=== Key ===
Symbol	Meaning
†	The bowler was man of the match
‡	10 or more wickets taken in the match
§	One of two five-wicket hauls by the bowler in the match
Date	Day the Test started or ODI was held
Inn	Innings in which five-wicket haul was taken
Overs	Number of overs bowled
Runs	Number of runs conceded
Wkts	Number of wickets taken
Econ	Runs conceded per over
Batsmen	Batsmen whose wickets were taken
Result	Result of the match

=== Tests ===
Five-wicket hauls in Test matches at Barabati Stadium
No.	Bowler	Date	Team	Opposing team	Inn	Overs	Runs	Wkts	Econ	Batsmen	Result
1	Ravi Ratnayeke	4 January 1987	Sri Lanka	India	1	27.3	85	5	3.09	Sunil Gavaskar; Raman Lamba; Ravi Shastri; Dilip Vengsarkar; Maninder Singh	India won
2	Narendra Hirwani	8 November 1995	India	New Zealand	2	31	59	6	1.90	Mark Greatbatch; Roger Twose; Adam Parore; Martin Crowe; Chris Cairns; Matthew Hart	Drawn

== Records ==
Match Information:

Game Type	No. of Games
Test Matches	2
ODI	19
T20I	2

Test Match Statistics:

Category	Information
Highest Team Score	India (400 All Out against Sri Lanka)
Lowest Team Score	Sri Lanka (142 All Out against India)
Best Batting Performance	Dilip Vengsarkar (166 Runs against Sri Lanka)
Best Bowling Performance	Narendra Hirwani (6/59 against New Zealand)

ODI Match Statistics:

Category	Information
Highest Team Score	India (381/6 in 50 Overs against England)
Lowest Team Score	West Indies (113 All Out in 34.2 Overs against Australia)
Best Batting Performance	Mohammad Azharuddin (153* Runs against Zimbabwe)
Best Bowling Performance	Daren Powell (4/27 against India)

== Notable events ==
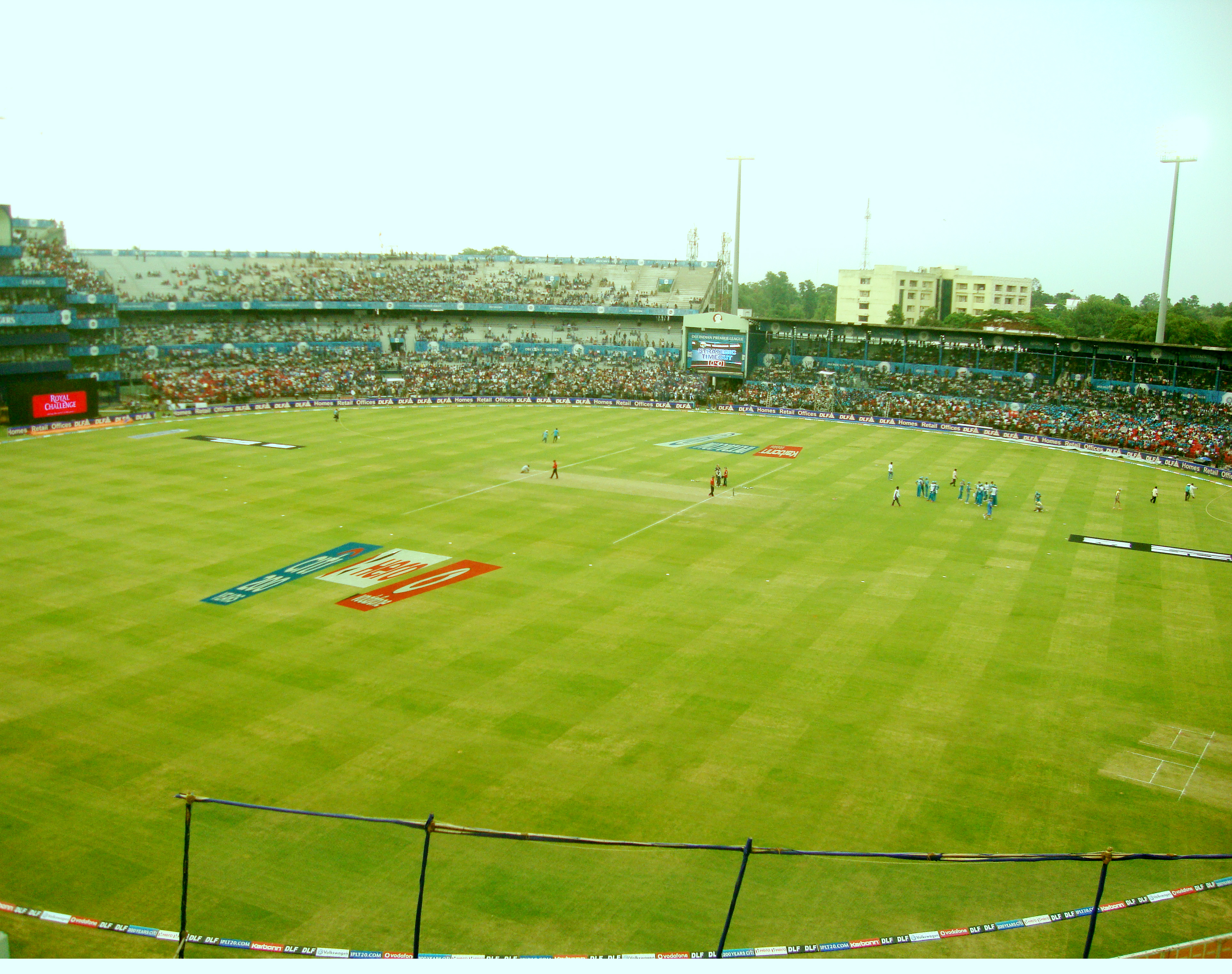
Barabati stadium

- Kapil Dev bagged his 300th test wicket when he bowled Rumesh Ratnayake of Sri Lanka in January 1987
- The Stadium hosted matches in two World Cups hosted in the subcontinent – 1987 Cricket World Cup (Australia beat Zimbabwe by 70 runs)and 1996 Cricket World Cup (India beat Kenya by 7 Wickets)
- Mohammad Azharuddin and Ajay Jadeja put on an unbroken 275 run partnership against Zimbabwe which was the then highest ODI partnership
- The above partnership is the current world record for the 4th Wicket in ODI Cricket.
- The partnership is the current world record for any unbroken partnership.
- The most runs scored here in Test cricket was by India who were all out for 400 in 1987 and 298–8 in 1995. The third highest score was by Sri Lanka who were dismissed for 191 runs in 1987.
- In Test cricket, the most runs scored here was by Dilip Vengsarkar(166 runs) followed by Kapil Dev(60 runs) and Sri Lankan Roy Dias(58 runs).
- The most wickets were taken by Narendra Hirwani and Maninder Singh(6 wickets each) followed by Sri Lankan Ravi Ratnayeke and Kapil Dev (5 wickets each).
- In ODIs, the highest score was made by India who scored 381–6 in 2017.
- In ODIs, highest individual score at the venue is 153* by Mohammad Azharuddin against Zimbabwe.
- The most runs scored here was by Sachin Tendulkar with 469 runs, followed by Ajay Jadeja with 273 runs and Rohit Sharma with 262 runs.
- The most wickets taken here was by Ravindra Jadeja (10 wickets), followed by Anil Kumble, Ishant Sharma and Ajit Agarkar all with 7 wickets each
- On 19 January 2017, in the 2nd ODI match between India vs England Yuvraj Singh 150(127) and Mahendra Singh Dhoni 134(122), both Scored their last century at this Stadium that helped India to reach 381/6 (50 Overs). It was the second highest 4th Wicket partnership of 256 runs at this venue. England scored 366/8 (50 overs) with the help of Eoin Morgan 102(81) runs. As a result, India won the match by 15 runs.

== Santosh Trophy 2012 ==
This stadium was the main venue of the 2012 Santosh Trophy football tournament which was won by Services.

== See also ==
- List of Test cricket grounds
- List of international cricket grounds in India
- Lists of stadiums
