= 2025–26 Indian Women's League =

Indian Women's League
- Season: 2025–26
- Dates: 20 December 2025 – 18 May 2026
- Champions: East Bengal (2nd title)
- Relegated: Sesa; Sribhumi
- AFC Champions League: East Bengal
- Matches: 54
- Goals: 175 (3.24 per match)
- Top goalscorer: Fazila Ikwaput (20 goals)
- Best goalkeeper: Panthoi Chanu Elangbam
- Biggest home win: East Bengal 9–0 Sesa (30 December 2025)
- Biggest away win: Kickstart 0–5 Nita (27 December 2025); Sesa 0–5 Sethu; Nita 0–5 East Bengal (2 January 2026); Kickstart 0–5 East Bengal (6 January 2026)
- Highest scoring: East Bengal 9–0 Sesa (30 December 2025)
- Longest winning run: East Bengal (9 matches)
- Longest unbeaten run: East Bengal (9 matches)
- Longest winless run: Sesa (13 matches)
- Longest losing run: Sesa (5 matches)

The 2025–26 Indian Women's League was the ninth season of the Indian Women's League, the top division women's professional football league in India. Defending champions East Bengal won their second consecutive top tier title on 12 May 2026.

== Changes from last season ==
Eight clubs will compete in the 9th season, with two clubs promoted from 2024–25 Indian Women's League 2. In November 2025, AIFF announced that the league will be held in two phases. The first phase will be held from 20 December 2025 to 6 January 2026, while the second phase will be held from 27 April to 18 May 2026. A move away from the club based home venues to centralised venues, with double-round-robin format preserved. While AIFF had promoted their developmental team Indian Arrows Women on 11 July 2025, but the decision was later rescinded on 23 November 2025 and Sesa was promoted.

Promoted from Indian Women's League 2

- Garhwal United ▲
- Sesa ▲

Relegated to Indian Women's League 2

- Odisha ▼
- HOPS ▼

== Clubs ==
Locations of the Indian Women's League clubs
Location of the Kolkata football clubs

=== Stadiums and locations ===
The matches for the first phase will be played at two venues located in Kolkata and Kalyani, West Bengal; National Center of Excellence and Kalyani Stadium respectively. The second phase will be played at National Center of Excellence and East Bengal Ground.

Club	City	State/Region
East Bengal	Kolkata	West Bengal
Garhwal United	New Delhi	Delhi
Gokulam Kerala	Kozhikode	Kerala
Kickstart	Bengaluru	Karnataka
Nita	Cuttack	Odisha
Sesa	Sircaim	Goa
Sethu	Madurai	Tamil Nadu
Sribhumi	Kolkata	West Bengal

=== Personnel and sponsorships ===
Team	Head coach	Captain	Kit manufacturer	Shirt sponsor
East Bengal	(India) Anthony Andrews	(Uganda) Resty Nanziri	Trak Only	Emami
Garhwal United	(India) Akshay Unni	(India) Sanfida Nongrum	Nivia	Infinix, Itel, M3M, Techno
Gokulam Kerala	(India) Raman Vijayan	(India) Roja Devi Asem	Flyhigh	Reporter TV, Sree Gokulam
Kickstart	(India) Chaoba Devi Langam	(India) Linthoingambi Devi Wangkhem	Sweat	Amagi
Nita	(India) Paromita Sit	(India) Pyari Xaxa	KTH	Falcon Charity Foundation
Sesa	(India) Nicholas Rodrigues	(India) Aaroshi Govekar	AG	Vedanta
Sethu	(India) Manoj Joshi	(Nepal) Anjila Tumbapo Subba	Snugly Couture	Cosco, De Shayra Skinz, PRIST, SIT
Sribhumi	(India) Sujata Kar	(India) Grace Dangmei	Trak Only	Athlead Sports School, Cosco, Purti

=== Managerial changes ===
Team	Outgoing manager	Manner of departure	Date of vacancy	Position in table	Incoming manager	Date of appointment
Sesa	(India) Nicholas Lewis Rodrigues	Mutual consent	2 January 2026	8th	(India) Gavin Elias Araujo	6 January 2026
Kickstart	(India) Chaoba Devi Langam	Managing Manipur youth	January 2026	7th	(India) Raghu Kumar Muniswamy	March 2026
Sesa	(India) Gavin Elias Araujo	End of interim spell	3 May 2026	8th	(India) Edith Lauriano Fernandes	6 May 2026

== Foreign players ==
Teams allowed to register maximum of three foreign players. All three can be part of the starting lineup.

Players name in bold indicates that the player was registered during the mid-season transfer window.

Club	Player 1	Player 2	Player 3	Former player(s)
East Bengal	(Ghana) Fazila Ikwaput	(Ghana) Resty Nanziri	(Ghana) Abena Anoma Opoku	—
Garhwal United	(Ghana) Ernestina Tetteh	(Ghana) **Elizabeth Danso**	(Ghana) **Catherine Arthur**	(Ghana) Joyce Larbi
Gokulam Kerala	(Kenya) Phoeby Okech	(Cameroon) **Sorelle Hornella Metiefangtagne**	(Nigeria) **Emueje Ogbiagbevha**	(Ghana) Sandra Atinga (Mozambique) Ninika
Kickstart	(Nigeria) Emem Essien	(Nepal) **Saru Limbu**	(Nepal) **Renuka Nagarkote**	(Nigeria) Rafiat Titilayo Aweda (Nigeria) Loveth Njideka Edeh
Nita	(Ghana) Sussana Konadu	(Ghana) Matilda Kwao	(Kenya) **Elizabeth Kioko Katungwa**	(Togo) Amiratou N'djambara
Sesa	(Kenya) Bertha Adhiambo Omita	(Bhutan) **Sangita Monger**	(Kenya) **Maurine Achieng**	(Ghana) Diana Antwi (Ghana) Beatrice Ntiwaa Nketia
Sethu	(Nepal) Anjila Tumbapo Subba	(Ghana) Abigail Antwi	(Ghana) Doreen Graham	—
Sribhumi	(Ghana) Felicia Daw Owusu	(Ghana) **Philomena Abakah**	(Ghana) **Veronica Appiah**	(Ghana) Priscilla Lartey

== League table ==
Pos	Team	Pld	W	D	L	GF	GA	GD	Pts	Qualification or relegation
1	East Bengal (C)	14	13	0	1	47	5	+42	39	Qualification for AFC Champions League
2	Sethu	14	7	4	3	26	14	+12	25	
3	Kickstart	14	6	3	5	17	21	−4	21	
4	Nita	14	5	5	4	26	23	+3	20	
5	Gokulam Kerala	14	4	6	4	16	16	0	18	
6	Garhwal United	14	4	3	7	16	28	−12	15	
7	Sribhumi (R)	14	3	4	7	24	26	−2	13	Relegation to Indian Women's League 2
8	Sesa (R)	14	0	3	11	9	48	−39	3	Relegation to Indian Women's League 2

Source: IFL
Rules for classification: 1) points; 2) head-to-head points; 3) head-to-head goal difference; 4) goal difference; 5) number of goals scored; 6)drawing of lots
(C) Champions; (R) Relegated

== Results ==
=== Fixtures and results ===
Home \ Away	EAB	GWU	GOK	KST	NIT	SES	SET	SRI
East Bengal		2–1	2–1	1–2	2–0	9–0	1–0	3–1
Garhwal United	0–5		2–6	0–1	0–1	3–1	2–1	0–3
Gokulam Kerala	0–3	1–1		1–0	1–1	3–0	0–0	0–4
Kickstart	0–5	0–1	1–0		0–5	3–1	1–1	2–1
Nita	0–5	0–0	1–1	1–1		6–1	1–3	3–2
Sesa	0–6	1–3	0–0	0–3	2–3		0–5	2–2
Sethu	0–1	4–1	1–1	2–1	2–1	1–1		2–1
Sribhumi	0–2	2–2	0–1	2–2	3–3	1–0	2–4	

Source: IFL
Legend: Blue = home team win; Yellow = draw; Red = away team win.

=== Results by match ===
The table lists the results of the teams after each match.

Match	1	2	3	4	5	6	7	8	9	10	11	12	13	14
East Bengal	W	W	W	W	W	W	W	W	W	L	W	W	W	W
Garhwal United	W	W	L	L	D	L	L	D	D	L	W	L	L	W
Gokulam Kerala	D	L	D	W	D	D	L	W	L	W	L	W	D	D
Kickstart	L	L	L	L	W	L	W	D	W	W	W	W	D	D
Nita	D	W	W	W	L	L	W	D	D	L	D	L	W	D
Sesa	L	L	L	L	L	D	L	L	L	D	L	D	L	L
Sethu	W	L	D	W	W	W	W	L	W	W	L	D	D	D
Sribhumi	W	W	L	L	W	L	L	D	L	D	D	L	D	L

Source: IFL
W = Win; D = Draw; L = Loss

=== Positions by round ===
The table lists the positions of teams after each round mentioned in official fixtures.

Team ╲ Round	1	2	3	4	5	6	7	8^{1}	9	10	11	12	13	14
East Bengal	5^{*}	4	4	2	1	1	1	1	1	1	1	1	1	1
Garhwal United	1	1	3	5	4	5	5	6	7	7	7	7	7	6
Gokulam Kerala	3	6	6	6	6	6	6	5	5	4	5	5	5	5
Kickstart	7	7	7	7	7	7	7	7	6	5	4	3	3	3
Nita	4	2	1	1	3	3	3	3	3	3	3	4	4	4
Sesa	8	8	8	8	8	8	8	8	8	8	8	8	8	8
Sethu	2	5	5	3	2	2	2	2	2	2	2	2	2	2
Sribhumi	6^{*}	3	2	4	5	4	4	4	4	6	6	6	6	7

Source: IFL
= Champions; = Relegation
Notes: * indicates the team did not play during the gameweek, ^{1} includes postponed matches of Round 1

== Matches ==
- All times are in IST (UTC+5:30).

=== Round 1 ===
20 December 2025	Sethu	2–1	Kickstart	Kolkata
09:00	Kaviya 20'; Malavika 50'	I-League; Report	Thingbaijam 12'	Stadium: National Center of Excellence; Attendance: 0 Referee: Neetu Rana; Player of the Match: Ruchi Yadav (Sethu)

20 December 2025	Nita	1–1	Gokulam Kerala	Kalyani
15:00	Sillay 40'	I-League; Report	Ninika 46'	Stadium: Kalyani Stadium; Attendance: 50; Referee: Pooja S. Player of the Match: Neha Sillay (Nita)

20 December 2025	Garhwal United	3–1	Sesa	Kolkata
15:00	Kipgen 12'; Nongrum 15'; Pal 45+4'	I-League; Report	Khatun 89'	Stadium: National Center of Excellence; Attendance: 0 Referee: Ruba Devi G. Player of the Match: Sanfida Nongrum (Garhwal United)

=== Round 2 ===
24 December 2025	Gokulam Kerala	0–4	Sribhumi	Kalyani
09:00		I-League; Report	Dangmei 4', 59'; Haldar 66'; Kayenpaibam 77'	Stadium: Kalyani Stadium; Attendance: 40; Referee: Bishnupriya Das; Player of the Match: Phoeby Okech (Gokulam Kerala)

24 December 2025	Nita	6–1	Sesa	Kolkata
09:00	Xaxa 1', 71', 74'; Khumukcham 6'; N'djambara 25', 60'	I-League; Report	D. Antwi 90+3'	Stadium: National Center of Excellence; Attendance: 20; Referee: Mahi Tudu; Player of the Match: Pyari Xaxa (Nita)

24 December 2025	Sethu	0–1	East Bengal	Kalyani
14:30		I-League; Report	Guguloth 77'	Stadium: Kalyani Stadium; Attendance: 100; Referee: Sen Hangma Subba; Player of the Match: Soumya Guguloth

24 December 2025	Kickstart	0–1	Garhwal United	Kolkata
14:30		I-League; Report	Kipgen 79'	Stadium: National Center of Excellence; Attendance: 25; Referee: Kusum Mandi; Player of the Match: Lhingdeikim Kipgen

=== Round 3 ===
27 December 2025	Kickstart	0–5	Nita	Kolkata
09:00		I-League; Report	Xaxa 2', 31', 76'; N'djambara 38'; Sillay 64'	Stadium: National Center of Excellence; Attendance: 100; Referee: Singdha Mondal; Player of the Match: Pyari Xaxa (Nita)

27 December 2025	Sribhumi	1–0	Sesa	Kalyani
09:00	Tamang 20'	I-League; Report		Stadium: Kalyani Stadium; Attendance: 30; Referee: Pooja S. Player of the Match: Mamta Verma (Sribhumi)

27 December 2025	Sethu	1–1	Gokulam Kerala	Kolkata
14:30	Kaviya 16'	I-League; Report	M. Subba 90+3'	Stadium: National Center of Excellence; Attendance: 150; Referee: Neetu Rana; Player of the Match: Muskan Subba (Gokulam Kerala)

27 December 2025	East Bengal	2–1	Garhwal United	Kalyani
14:30	Raul 22'; Ikwaput 63'	I-League; Report	Singha 72'	Stadium: Kalyani Stadium; Attendance: 100; Referee: Ranjita Devi Tekcham; Player of the Match: Astam Oraon (East Bengal)

=== Round 4 ===
30 December 2025	Garhwal United	0–1	Nita	Kolkata
09:00		I-League; Report	Pyari Xaxa 7'	Stadium: National Center of Excellence; Attendance: 50; Referee: Mahi Tudu; Player of the Match: Neha Sillay (Nita)

30 December 2025	Sribhumi	2–4	Sethu	Kalyani
09:00	Shirvoikar 50', 87'	I-League; Report	Kom 10', 18', 90+5' (pen.); A. Antwi 46'	Stadium: Kalyani Stadium; Attendance: 50; Referee: Sen Hangma Subba; Player of the Match: Lynda Kom (Sethu)

30 December 2025	Gokulam Kerala	1–0	Kickstart	Kolkata
14:30	Asem 52'	I-League; Report		Stadium: National Center of Excellence; Attendance: 70; Referee: Ruba Devi G. Player of the Match: Roja Devi Asem (Gokulam Kerala)

30 December 2025	East Bengal	9–0	Sesa	Kalyani
14:30	Guguloth 6', 54', 86'; Ikwaput 9', 22', 25', 72'; Raul 18'; Nanziri 40'	I-League; Report		Stadium: Kalyani Stadium; Attendance: 300; Referee: Bishnupriya Das; Player of the Match: Soumya Guguloth (East Bengal)

=== Round 5 ===
2 January 2026	Gokulam Kerala	1–1	Garhwal United	Kolkata
09:00	Shilji 21'	I-League; Report	Pal 52'	Stadium: National Center of Excellence; Attendance: 30; Referee: Pooja S. Player of the Match: Deepika Pal (Garhwal United)

2 January 2026	Kickstart	2–1	Sribhumi	Kalyani
09:00	Edeh 81'; Thingbaijam 85' (pen.)	I-League; Report	Yumnam 12' (pen.)	Stadium: Kalyani Stadium; Attendance: 50; Referee: Neetu Rana; Player of the Match: Babysana Devi Thingbaijam (Kickstart)

2 January 2026	Sesa	0–5	Sethu	Kolkata
14:30		I-League; Report	Thokchom 24'; Kaviya 27'; Lisham 35'; Kom 65'; Yadav 72'	Stadium: National Center of Excellence; Attendance: 40; Referee: Kusum Mandi; Player of the Match: Malavika Prasad (Sethu)

2 January 2026	Nita	0–5	East Bengal	Kalyani
14:30		I-League; Report	Raul 6'; Guguloth 42'; Nanziri 51'; Ikwaput 63'; Naorem 89'	Stadium: Kalyani Stadium; Attendance: 350; Referee: Ranjita Devi Tekcham; Player of the Match: Resty Nanziri (East Bengal)

=== Round 6 ===
6 January 2026	Sesa	0–0	Gokulam Kerala	Kolkata
09:00		I-League; Report		Stadium: National Center of Excellence; Attendance: 20; Referee: Bishnupriya Das; Player of the Match: Baby Lalchhandami (Gokulam Kerala)

6 January 2026	Garhwal United	0–3	Sribhumi	Kalyani
10:00		Report	Toijam 56'; Kayenpaibam 79'; Tamang 90+1'	Stadium: Kalyani Stadium; Attendance: 70; Referee: Ruba Devi G. Player of the Match: Anju Tamang (Sribhumi)

6 January 2026	Sethu	2–1	Nita	Kolkata
14:30	Kom 72', 81'	I-League; Report	Xaxa 7'	Stadium: National Center of Excellence; Attendance: 50; Referee: Singdha Mondal; Player of the Match: Lynda Kom (Sethu)

6 January 2026	Kickstart	0–5	East Bengal	Kalyani
14:30		I-League; Report	Ikwaput 15', 73'; Nanziri 45+2'; Raul 60'; Oraon 62'	Stadium: Kalyani Stadium; Attendance: 450; Referee: Sen Hangma Subba; Player of the Match: Fazila Ikwaput (East Bengal)

=== Round 7 ===
9 January 2026	Kickstart	3–1	Sesa	Kolkata
09:00	Essien 2', 61', 90+3'	I-League; Report	Barretto 17'	Stadium: National Center of Excellence; Attendance: 25; Referee: Sen Hangma Subba; Player of the Match: Emem Peace Essien (Kickstart)

9 January 2026	Nita	3–2	Sribhumi	Kalyani
09:00	Shirvoikar 25' (o.g.); Xaxa 55', 90'	I-League; Report	Tamang 45+2'; Shirvoikar 67'	Stadium: Kalyani Stadium; Attendance: 30; Referee: Pooja S. Player of the Match: Pyari Xaxa (Nita)

9 January 2026	Sethu	4–1	Garhwal United	Kolkata
14:30	Dhurga 53'; Malavika 60'; Kom 62'; Phanjoubam 74'	I-League; Report	Tingjoukim 84'	Stadium: National Center of Excellence; Attendance: 30; Referee: Mahi Tudu; Player of the Match: Ruchi Yadav (Sethu)

9 January 2026	Gokulam Kerala	0–3	East Bengal	Kalyani
14:30		I-League; Report	Ikwaput 36'; Nanziri 55'; Raul 76'	Stadium: Kalyani Stadium; Attendance: 300; Referee: Ranjita Devi Tekcham; Player of the Match: Shilky Devi Hemam (East Bengal)

=== Round 1 (cont.) ===
27 April 2026	East Bengal	3–1	Sribhumi	Kolkata
16:00	Ikwaput 37', 46', 60'	IFL; Report	Haldar 80'	Stadium: East Bengal Ground; Attendance: 300; Referee: Ranjita Devi Tekcham; Player of the Match: Fazila Ikwaput (East Bengal)

=== Round 8 ===
30 April 2026	Nita	1–1	Kickstart	Kolkata
09:00	Bag 85' (o.g.)	IFL; Report	Pisda 49'	Stadium: National Center of Excellence; Attendance: 30; Referee: Rachana Kamani; Player of the Match: Kiran Pisda (Kickstart)

30 April 2026	Gokulam Kerala	3–0	Sesa	Kolkata
09:00	Asem 45+3'; Ogbiagbevha 79'; Shaji 87'	IFL; Report		Stadium: East Bengal Ground; Attendance: 25; Referee: Mahi Tudu; Player of the Match: Roja Devi Asem (Gokulam Kerala)

30 April 2026	East Bengal	1–0	Sethu	Kolkata
15:00	Ikwaput 64'	IFL; Report		Stadium: East Bengal Ground; Attendance: 150; Referee: Bishnupriya Das; Player of the Match: Malavika Prasad (Sethu)

30 April 2026	Sribhumi	2–2	Garhwal United	Kolkata
15:00	Nongmeikapam 71' (pen.); Haldar 80'	IFL; Report	Tingjoukim 7'; Danso 8'	Stadium: National Center of Excellence; Attendance: 30; Referee: Pooja S. Player of the Match: Rimpa Haldar (Sribhumi)

=== Round 9 ===
3 May 2026	Sesa	0–3	Kickstart	Kolkata
16:00		IFL; Report	Essien 17'; Limbu 29'; Thingbaijam 67' (pen.)	Stadium: National Center of Excellence; Attendance: 30; Referee: Ranjita Devi Tekcham; Player of the Match: Emem Essien (Kickstart)

3 May 2026	Sethu	2–1	Sribhumi	Kolkata
16:00	S. Kumari 13'; Kom 20'	IFL; Report	Abakah 38' (pen.)	Stadium: East Bengal Ground; Attendance: 40; Referee: Neetu Rana; Player of the Match: Malavika Prasad (Sethu)

3 May 2026	Nita	0–0	Garhwal United	Kolkata
20:00		IFL; Report		Stadium: National Center of Excellence; Attendance: 20; Referee: Snigdha Mondal; Player of the Match: Jasoda Munda (Nita)

3 May 2026	East Bengal	2–1	Gokulam Kerala	Kolkata
20:00	Ikwaput 6', 65'	IFL; Report	S. Singh 70'	Stadium: East Bengal Ground; Attendance: 100; Referee: Ruba Devi G. Player of the Match: Fazila Ikwaput (East Bengal)

=== Round 10 ===
6 May 2026	Garhwal United	2–6	Gokulam Kerala	Kolkata
16:00	Nongrum 16'; S. Kumari 27'	IFL; Report	Ogbiagbevha 11', 42'; Theertha Lakshmi 22'; M. Subba 70'; Sahena 90+3'; Kashyap 90+5'	Stadium: National Center of Excellence; Attendance: 16; Referee: Mahi Tudu; Player of the Match: Emueje Ogbiagbevha (Gokulam Kerala)

6 May 2026	Sesa	2–2	Sribhumi	Kolkata
16:00	Omita 37'; Barretto 55'	IFL; Report	Ngangom 47', 84'	Stadium: East Bengal Ground; Attendance: 30; Referee: Pooja S. Player of the Match: Bala Devi Ngangom (Sribhumi)

6 May 2026	Nita	1–3	Sethu	Kolkata
20:00	Sillay 17'	IFL; Report	Prasad 64', 81'; Yadav 72'	Stadium: National Center of Excellence; Attendance: 16; Referee: Ranjita Devi Tekcham; Player of the Match: Malavika Prasad (Sethu)

6 May 2026	East Bengal	1–2	Kickstart	Kolkata
20:00	Ikwaput 7'	IFL; Report	Essien 16'; Thingbaijam 58'	Stadium: East Bengal Ground; Attendance: 100; Referee: Rachana Hasmukh Kamani; Player of the Match: Sandhya Maity (East Bengal)

=== Round 11 ===
9 May 2026	Sribhumi	3–3	Nita	Kolkata
09:00	Appiah 32'; Abakah 78'; Dangmei 90+5'	IFL; Report	Kioko 22', 55'; Xaxa 43'	Stadium: National Center of Excellence; Attendance: 10; Referee: Ruba Devi G. Player of the Match: Neha Sillay (Nita)

9 May 2026	Kickstart	1–0	Gokulam Kerala	Kolkata
16:00	Limbu 17'	IFL; Report		Stadium: National Center of Excellence; Attendance: Neetu Rana; Referee: 15; Player of the Match: Saru Limbu (Kickstart)

9 May 2026	Sesa	0–6	East Bengal	Kolkata
20:00		IFL; Report	Angamuthu 14', 28'; Guguloth 45+1'; Lepcha 45+4'; Ikwaput 70'; Nanziri 87'	Stadium: East Bengal Ground; Attendance: 100; Referee: Bishnupriya Das; Player of the Match: Karthika Angamuthu (East Bengal)

9 May 2026	Garhwal United	2–1	Sethu	Kolkata
20:00	Singha 33'; Danso 68'	IFL; Report	Narzary 27'	Stadium: National Center of Excellence; Attendance: 25; Referee: Mahi Tudu; Player of the Match: Monisha Singha (Garhwal United)

=== Round 12 ===
12 May 2026	Sethu	1–1	Sesa	Kolkata
16:00	Kom 9'	IFL; Report	Achieng 59'	Stadium: National Center of Excellence; Attendance: 15; Referee: Snigdha Mondal; Player of the Match: Maurine Achieng (Sesa)

12 May 2026	Sribhumi	0–1	Gokulam Kerala	Kolkata
16:00		IFL; Report	Ogbiagbevha 42'	Stadium: East Bengal Ground; Attendance: 25; Referee: Rachana Hashmukh Kamani; Player of the Match: Emueje Ogbiagbevha (Gokulam Kerala)

12 May 2026	Garhwal United	0–1	Kickstart	Kolkata
20:00		IFL; Report	Bag 41'	Stadium: National Center of Excellence; Attendance: 15; Referee: Ranjita Devi Tekcham; Player of the Match: Aruna Bag (Kickstart)

12 May 2026	East Bengal	2–0	Nita	Kolkata
20:00	Guguloth 25', 65'	IFL; Report		Stadium: East Bengal Ground; Attendance: 50; Referee: Pooja S. Player of the Match: Soumya Guguloth (East Bengal)

=== Round 13 ===
15 May 2026	Sesa	2–3	Nita	Kolkata
16:00	Achieng 62'; Pednekar 90+8'	IFL; Report	Xaxa 38'; Konadu 60'; Colney 90'	Stadium: National Center of Excellence; Attendance: 50; Referee: Rachana Hasmukh Kamani; Player of the Match: Sussana Konadu (Nita)

15 May 2026	Sribhumi	2–2	Kickstart	Kolkata
16:00	Ngangom 3'; Appiah 31'	IFL; Report	Essien 33'; Balamurugan 71'	Stadium: East Bengal Ground; Attendance: 20; Referee: Neetu Rana; Player of the Match: Ranjana Chanu Sorokhaibam (Kickstart)

15 May 2026	Gokulam Kerala	0–0	Sethu	Kolkata
20:00		IFL; Report		Stadium: National Center of Excellence; Attendance: 20; Referee: Mahi Tudu; Player of the Match: Shilji Shaji (Gokulam Kerala)

15 May 2026	Garhwal United	0–5	East Bengal	Kolkata
20:00		IFL; Report	Guguloth 13', 63'; Naorem 28'; Ikwaput 71', 73'	Stadium: East Bengal Ground; Attendance: 100; Referee: Ruba Devi G. Player of the Match: Soumya Guguloth (East Bengal)

=== Round 14 ===
18 May 2026	Gokulam Kerala	1–1	Nita	Kolkata
15:00	Selladurai 9'	IFL; Report	Xaxa 45+3'	Stadium: East Bengal Ground; Attendance: 50; Referee: Pooja S.

18 May 2026	Kickstart	1–1	Sethu	Kolkata
15:00	Emem Essien 22'	IFL; Report	Hoshika 83'	Stadium: National Center of Excellence; Attendance: 15; Referee: Snigdha Mondal; Player of the Match: Emem Essien (Kickstart)

18 May 2026	Sesa	1–3	Garhwal United	Kolkata
19:00	Kanhar 36'	IFL; Report	Kipgen 27'; Danso 39'; S. Kumari 59'	Stadium: National Center of Excellence; Attendance: 10; Referee: Bishnupriya Das; Player of the Match: Elizabeth Danso (Garhwal United)

18 May 2026	Sribhumi	0–2	East Bengal	Kolkata
19:00		IFL; Report	Ikwaput 41' (pen.); Raul 55'	Stadium: East Bengal Ground; Attendance: 350; Referee: Neetu Rana; Player of the Match: Fazila Ikwaput (East Bengal)

== Season statistics ==
As of 18 May 2026

=== Top scorers ===
Rank	Player	Club	Goals
1	(Uganda) Fazila Ikwaput	East Bengal	20
2	(India) Pyari Xaxa	Nita	13
3	(India) Soumya Guguloth	East Bengal	10
4	(India) Lynda Kom	Sethu	9
5	(Nigeria) Emem Essien	Kickstart	7
6	(India) Sulanjana Raul	East Bengal	5
7	(Uganda) Resty Nanziri	East Bengal	5
8	(India) Malavika Prasad	Sethu	4
8	(India) Babysana Devi Thingbaijam	Kickstart	4
8	(Nigeria) Emueje Ogbiagbevha	Gokulam Kerala	4

=== Hat-tricks ===
Player	For	Against	Result	Date
(India) Pyari Xaxa	Nita	Sesa	6–1 (H)	24 December 2025
(India) Pyari Xaxa	Nita	Kickstart	5–0 (A)	27 December 2025
(India) Lynda Kom	Sethu	Sribhumi	4–2 (A)	30 December 2025
(Uganda) Fazila Ikwaput	East Bengal	Sesa	9–0 (H)	30 December 2025
(India) Soumya Guguloth	East Bengal	Sesa	9–0 (H)	30 December 2025
(Nigeria) Emem Essien	Kickstart	Sesa	3–1 (H)	9 January 2026
(Uganda) Fazila Ikwaput	East Bengal	Sribhumi	3–1 (H)	27 April 2026

Notes

- (H) – Home team
- (A) – Away team

=== Clean sheets ===
Rank	Player	Club	Clean sheets
1	(India) Panthoi Chanu Elangbam	East Bengal	10
2	(India) Monalisha Devi Moirangthem	Sribhumi	4
3	(India) Adrija Sarkhel	Nita	3
3	(India) Linthoingambi Devi Maibam	Kickstart	3
5	(India) Ribansi Jamu	Garhwal United	2
5	(India) Melody Chanu Keisham	Gokulam Kerala	2
5	(Nepal) Anjila Tumbapo Subba	Sethu	2
5	(India) Shreya Hooda	Gokulam Kerala	2
9	(India) Hempriya Seram	Sethu	1
9	(Ghana) Beatrice Ntiwaa Nketia	Sesa	1
9	(India) Aishwarya A.	Kickstart	1
9	(India) Sowmiya Narayanasamy	Gokulam Kerala	1
9	(India) Mamani Das	East Bengal	1

== Awards ==
=== Season awards ===
The following awards will be given at the conclusion of the season:

Award	Winner	Club
Best Striker	(Uganda) Fazila Ikwaput	East Bengal
Best Goalkeeper	(India) Panthoi Chanu Elangbam	East Bengal
Best Defender	(India) Nirmala Devi Phanjoubam	Sethu
Best Midfielder	(India) Sanfida Nongrum	Garhwal United

== See also ==
- Men
  - 2025–26 Indian Super League (Tier I)
  - 2025–26 Indian Football League (Tier II)
  - 2025–26 I-League 2 (Tier III)
  - 2025–26 I-League 3 (Tier IV)
  - 2025–26 Indian State Leagues (Tier V)
  - 2025–26 AIFF Super Cup
  - 2025 Durand Cup
  - 2026 Reliance Foundation Development League
- Women
  - 2025–26 Indian Women's League 2 (Tier II)
