= 2025–26 Gokulam Kerala FC (Women) season =

2025–26 season of Gokulam Kerala FC (Women)

Gokulam Kerala
2025-26 season
- Owner: Sree Gokulam Group
- Chairman President: Gokulam Gopalan; V. C. Praveen
- Head coach: Raman Vijayan
- Stadium: EMS Stadium
- Indian Women's League: 4th
- All statistics correct as of 22 December 2025.

The 2025–26 season was Gokulam Kerala's eighth season since its establishment in 2018 and their eighth participation in the Indian Women's League (IWL).

== Current technical staff ==
Position	Name
Head coach	(India) Raman Vijayan
Assistant coach	(India) Priyanka Kangralkar
Fitness and conditioning coach	(Brazil) Djair Miranda Garcia
Technical director	(India) Derrick Pereira
Goalkeeping coach	(India) Aadil Ansari
Team manager	(India) Azlam Shafi
Team analyst	(India) Anjitha

== First-team squad ==
As of 27 April 2026

Note: Flags indicate national team as defined under FIFA eligibility rules; some limited exceptions apply. Players may hold more than one non-FIFA nationality.

No.	Pos.	Nation	Player
1	GK	IND	Shreya Hooda
2	DF	IND	Thounaojam Kritina Devi
3	DF	IND	Alina Chingakham
4	MF	IND	Baby Lalchhandami
5	DF	IND	Sowntharya Rajkumar
6	DF	IND	Asem Roja Devi
7	MF	IND	Menaka Devi Lourembam
8	MF	CMR	Sorelle Hornella Metiefangtagne
10	FW	IND	Babita Devi Oinam
11	FW	IND	Heigrujam Daya Devi
12	MF	IND	Mira Devi Pukhrambam
13	DF	KEN	Phoeby Okech
14	DF	IND	Rejiya Devi Laishram
15	DF	IND	Th Sahena
16	DF	IND	Shubhangi Singh
17	MF	IND	Muskan Subba

No.	Pos.	Nation	Player
18	FW	IND	R. Darshini Devi
19	MF	IND	Harmilan Kaur
20	FW	IND	Shilji Shaji
21	GK	IND	Melody Chanu Keisham
22	GK	IND	Anitha S.
23	MF	IND	Remi Thokchom
24	MF	IND	Deblina Bhattacharjee
25	MF	IND	Priyanka Kashyap
26	FW	IND	Greeshma M. P.
30	MF	IND	Priyadharshini Selladurai
31	GK	IND	Sowmiya Narayanasamy
33	DF	IND	Dalima Chhibber
35	MF	IND	Jyoti Chouhan
55	DF	IND	Alexiba Samson
98	DF	IND	Theertha Laskhmi E.
99	FW	NGR	Emueje Ogbiagbevha

== Transfers ==
=== Transfers in ===
Entry date	Position	Player	Previous club	Fee	Ref.
24 October 2025	GK	(India) Melody Chanu Keisham	(India) East Bengal	Free Transfer	
24 October 2025	MF	(India) Remi Thokchom	(India)	Free Transfer	
24 October 2025	DF	(India) Alina Chingakham	(India) Inter Kashi FC	Free Transfer	
18 December 2025	GK	(India) Sowmiya Narayanasamy	(India)	Free Transfer	
18 December 2025	GK	(India) Shreya Hooda	(India) Odisha	Free Transfer	
18 December 2025	MF	(India) Priyadharshini Selladurai	(India) Liberty Ladies FC	Free Transfer	
18 December 2025	DF	(India) Sowntharya Rajkumar	(India) AADUKALAM SPORTS CLUB	Free Transfer	
18 December 2025	MF	(India) Menaka Devi Lourembam	(India) East Bengal	Free Transfer	
18 December 2025	MF	(India) Babita Devi Oinam	(India) Roots FA	Free Transfer	
18 December 2025	MF	(India) Mira Devi Pukhrambam	(India) Roots FA	Free Transfer	
18 December 2025	MF	(India) Deblina Bhattacharjee	(India)	Free Transfer	
18 December 2025	MF	(India) Priyanka Kashyap	(India)	Free Transfer	
19 December 2025	FW	(Mozambique) Ninika	(Jordan) Etihad Club	Free Transfer	
19 December 2025	MF	(Ghana) Sandra Atinga	(India) Sribhumi	Free Transfer	
05 January 2026	DF	(India) Dalima Chhibber	(India) Kickstart	Free Transfer	
09 January 2026	MF	(India) Jyoti Chouhan	(India) East Bengal	Free Transfer	
27 April 2026	MF	(Cameroon) Sorelle Hornella Metiefangtagne		Free Transfer	
27 April 2026	FW	(Nigeria) Emueje Ogbiagbevha		Free Transfer	
27 April 2026	DF	(India) Theertha Lakshmi		Free Transfer	

=== Transfers out ===
Exit date	Position	No.	Player	To club	Fee	Ref.
28 July 2025	FW	98	(India) Harshika Jain	(Romania) Olimpia Gherla	Free Transfer	
1 August 2025	FW	10	(Uganda) Fazila Ikwaput	(India) East Bengal	Free Transfer	
1 August 2025	MF	4	(India) Hemam Shilky Devi	(India) East Bengal	Free Transfer	
1 August 2025	GK	1	(India) Payal Basude	(India) East Bengal	Free Transfer	
1 November 2025	DF	6	(India) Martina Thokchom	(India) Sethu	Free Transfer	
1 November 2025	MF	7	(India) Nongmaithem Ratanbala Devi	(India) Sribhumi	Free Transfer	
1 November 2025	FW	11	(India) Manasa K.	(India) Quartz Women FA	Free Transfer	
1 November 2025	MF	15	(India) Soniya Jose	(India) United FC Cochin	Free Transfer	
1 November 2025	FW	11	(India) Arathy PM	(India) Quartz Women FA	Free Transfer	
1 November 2025	GK	32	(India) Aleena James	(India) SSC Cheruvathur	Free Transfer	
1 November 2025	MF	70	(India) Huidrom Ranjita Devi	(India) Deccan Dynamos	Free Transfer	
1 November 2025	FW	71	(India) Mahalakshmi	(India) Dipti Sangha F C	Free Transfer	
1 November 2025	DF	88	(India) Pranita Nimkar	(India) Sporting Club Bacaim	Free Transfer	
1 November 2025	FW	90	(Uganda) Sharon Namatovu		Free Transfer	
27 January 2026	FW	32	(Mozambique) Ninika		Free Transfer	
27 January 2026	MF	8	(Ghana) Sandra Atinga		Free Transfer	

== Competitions ==
=== Overview ===
Competition	First match	Last match	Starting round	Final position	Record							
Competition	First match	Last match	Starting round	Final position	Pld	W	D	L	GF	GA	GD	Win %
IWL	20 December 2025		Match Day 1	TBD	14	4	6	4	16	16	+0	28.57
Total					14	4	6	4	16	16	+0	28.57

Last updated: 18 May 2026
Source: Competitions

=== Indian Women's League ===
==== League table ====
Pos	Team	Pld	W	D	L	GF	GA	GD	Pts	Qualification or relegation
3	Kickstart	14	6	3	5	17	21	−4	21	
4	Nita	14	5	5	4	26	23	+3	20	
5	Gokulam Kerala	14	4	6	4	16	16	0	18	
6	Garhwal United	14	4	3	7	16	28	−12	15	
7	Sribhumi (R)	14	3	4	7	24	26	−2	13	Relegation to Indian Women's League 2

Source: IFL
Rules for classification: 1) points; 2) head-to-head points; 3) head-to-head goal difference; 4) goal difference; 5) number of goals scored; 6)drawing of lots
(R) Relegated

==== Results by round ====
Round	1	2	3	4	5	6	7	8	9	10	11	12	13	14
Ground	N	N	N	N	N	N	N	N	N	N	N	N	N	N
Result	D	L	D	W	D	D	L	W	L	W	L	W	D	D
Position	3	6	6	6	6	6	6	5	5	4	5	5	5	5
Points	1	1	2	5	6	7	7	10	10	13	13	16	17	18

A = Away; H = Home; N = Neutral; W = Win; D = Draw; L = Loss

==== Matches ====
In November 2025, AIFF announced that the league will be held in two phases. The first phase will be held from 20 December 2025 to 6 January 2026, while the second phase will be held from 20 April to 10 May 2026.

20 December 2025	Nita	1–1	Gokulam Kerala	Kalyani
15:00	Sillay 40'	I-League; PDF Report	Ninika 46'	Stadium: Kalyani Stadium; Attendance: 50; Referee: Pooja S. Player of the Match: Neha Sillay (Nita)

24 December 2025	Gokulam Kerala	0–4	Sribhumi	Kalyani
09:00		I-League; PDF Report	Dangmei 4', 59'; Haldar 66'; Kayenpaibam 77'	Stadium: Kalyani Stadium; Attendance: 40; Referee: Bishnupriya Das; Player of the Match: Phoeby Okech (Gokulam Kerala)

27 December 2025	Sethu	1–1	Gokulam Kerala	Kolkata
15:00	Kaviya 16'	I-League; PDF Report	M. Subba 90+3'	Stadium: National Center of Excellence; Attendance: 150; Referee: Neetu Rana; Player of the Match: Muskan Subba (Gokulam Kerala)

30 December 2025	Gokulam Kerala	1–0	Kickstart	Kolkata
15:00	Asem 52'	I-League; PDF Report		Stadium: National Center of Excellence; Attendance: 70; Referee: Ruba Devi G. Player of the Match: Roja Devi Asem (Gokulam Kerala)

2 January 2026	Gokulam Kerala	1-1	Garhwal United	Kolkata
09:00	Shilji 21'	I-League; PDF Report	Pal 52'	Stadium: National Center of Excellence; Attendance: 30; Referee: Pooja S. Player of the Match: Deepika Pal (Garhwal United)

6 January 2026	Sesa	0-0	Gokulam Kerala	Kolkata
09:00		I-League; PDF Report		Stadium: National Center of Excellence; Attendance: 20; Referee: Bishnupriya Das; Player of the Match: Baby Lalchhandami (Gokulam Kerala)

9 January 2026	Gokulam Kerala	0-3	East Bengal	Kalyani
15:00		I-League; PDF Report	Ikwaput 36'; Nanziri 55'; Raul 76'	Stadium: Kalyani Stadium; Attendance: 300; Referee: Ranjita Devi Tekcham; Player of the Match: Shilky Devi Hemam (East Bengal)

30 April 2026	Gokulam Kerala	3–0	Sesa	Kolkata
20:00	Asem 45+3'; Ogbiagbevha 79'; Shaji 87'	IFL; Report		Stadium: East Bengal Ground; Attendance: 25; Referee: Mahi Tudu; Player of the Match: Roja Devi Asem (Gokulam Kerala)

3 May 2026	East Bengal	2-1	Gokulam Kerala	Kolkata
20:00	Ikwaput 6', 65'	IFL; Report	S. Singh 70'	Stadium: East Bengal Ground; Attendance: 100; Referee: Ruba Devi G. Player of the Match: Fazila Ikwaput (East Bengal)

6 May 2026	Garhwal United	2-6	Gokulam Kerala	Kolkata
16:00	Nongrum 16'; S. Kumari 27'	IFL; Report	Ogbiagbevha 11', 42'; Theertha Lakshmi 22'; M. Subba 70'; Sahena 90+3'; Kashyap 90+5'	Stadium: National Center of Excellence; Attendance: 16; Referee: Mahi Tudu; Player of the Match: Emueje Ogbiagbevha (Gokulam Kerala)

9 May 2026	Kickstart	1-0	Gokulam Kerala	Kolkata
16:00	Limbu 17'	IFL		Stadium: National Center of Excellence; Attendance: Neetu Rana; Referee: 15; Player of the Match: Saru Limbu (Kickstart)

12 May 2026	Sribhumi	0-1	Gokulam Kerala	Kolkata
16:00		IFL	Ogbiagbevha 42'	Stadium: East Bengal Ground

15 May 2026	Gokulam Kerala	0-0	Sethu	Kolkata
20:00		IFL		Stadium: National Center of Excellence

18 May 2026	Gokulam Kerala	1–1	Nita	Kolkata
16:00	Selladurai 9'	IFL; Report	Xaxa 45+3'	Stadium: East Bengal Ground; Attendance: 50; Referee: Pooja S.

== Statistics ==
=== Goal scorers ===
Rank	No.	Pos.	Nat.	Name	IWL	Total
1	99	FW	(Nigeria)	Emueje Ogbiagbevha	4	4
2	6	DF	(India)	Roja Devi Asem	2	2
2	17	MF	(India)	Muskan Subba	2	2
2	20	FW	(India)	Shilji Shaji	2	2
5	15	DF	(India)	Th Sahena	1	1
5	16	DF	(India)	Shubhangi Singh	1	1
5	25	MF	(India)	Priyanka Kashyap	1	1
5	30	FW	(India)	Priyadharshini Selladurai	1	1
5	32	FW	(Mozambique)	Ninika	1	1
5	98	DF	(India)	Theertha Laskhmi E	1	1
Own Goals					0	0
Total					16	16

=== Clean sheets ===
Rank.	No.	Nation	Name	IWL	Total
1	1	(India)	Shreya Hooda	2	2
1	21	(India)	Melody Chanu Keisham	2	2
3	31	(India)	Sowmiya Narayanasamy	1	1
