= 2026–27 Gokulam Kerala FC (Women) season =

2026–27 season of Gokulam Kerala FC (Women)

Gokulam Kerala
2026-27 season
- Owner: Sree Gokulam Group
- Chairman President: Gokulam Gopalan; V. C. Praveen
- Head coach: Raman Vijayan
- Stadium: EMS Stadium
- Indian Women's League: TBD
- All statistics correct as of 18 June 2026.

The 2026–27 season Will be Gokulam Kerala's Ninth season since its establishment in 2018 and their eighth participation in the Indian Women's League (IWL).

== Current technical staff ==
| Position | Name |
|---|---|
| Head coach | (India) Raman Vijayan |
| Assistant coach | (India) Priyanka Kangralkar |
| Fitness and conditioning coach | (Brazil) Djair Miranda Garcia |
| Technical director | (India) Derrick Pereira |
| Goalkeeping coach | (India) Aadil Ansari |
| Team manager | (India) Azlam Shafi |
| Team analyst | (India) Anjitha |

== First-team squad ==
As of 30 September 2026

Note: Flags indicate national team as defined under FIFA eligibility rules; some limited exceptions apply. Players may hold more than one non-FIFA nationality.

| No. | Pos. | Nation | Player |
|---|---|---|---|
| 1 | GK | IND | Shreya Hooda |
| 2 | DF | IND | Thounaojam Kritina Devi |
| 3 | DF | IND | Alina Chingakham |
| 4 | MF | IND | Baby Lalchhandami |
| 5 | DF | IND | Sowntharya Rajkumar |
| 6 | DF | IND | Asem Roja Devi |
| 7 | MF | IND | Menaka Devi Lourembam |
| 8 | MF | CMR | Sorelle Hornella Metiefangtagne |
| 10 | FW | IND | Babita Devi Oinam |
| 11 | FW | IND | Heigrujam Daya Devi |
| 12 | MF | IND | Mira Devi Pukhrambam |
| 13 | DF | KEN | Phoeby Okech |
| 14 | DF | IND | Rejiya Devi Laishram |
| 15 | DF | IND | Th Sahena |
| 16 | DF | IND | Shubhangi Singh |
| 17 | MF | IND | Muskan Subba |
| 18 | FW | IND | R. Darshini Devi |

| No. | Pos. | Nation | Player |
|---|---|---|---|
| 19 | MF | IND | Harmilan Kaur |
| 20 | FW | IND | Shilji Shaji |
| 21 | GK | IND | Melody Chanu Keisham |
| 22 | GK | IND | Anitha S. |
| 23 | MF | IND | Remi Thokchom |
| 25 | MF | IND | Priyanka Kashyap |
| 26 | FW | IND | Greeshma M. P. |
| 30 | MF | IND | Priyadharshini Selladurai |
| 31 | GK | IND | Sowmiya Narayanasamy |
| 33 | DF | IND | Dalima Chhibber |
| 55 | DF | IND | Alexiba Samson |
| 98 | DF | IND | Theertha Laskhmi E. |
| 99 | FW | NGR | Emueje Ogbiagbevha |
| — | MF | IND | Mousumi Murmu |
| — | DF | IND | Trisha Mallick |
| — | MF | IND | Amisha Baxla |

== Transfers ==
=== Transfers in ===
| Entry date | Position | Player | Previous club | Fee | Ref. |
|---|---|---|---|---|---|
| 07 September 2026 | MF | (India) Mousumi Murmu | (India) Sribhumi | Free Transfer | |
| 30 September 2026 | DF | (India) Trisha Mallick | (India) Sethu | Free Transfer | |
| 17 October 2026 | MF | (India) Amisha Baxla | (India) Sporting Club Bacaim | Free Transfer | |

=== Transfers out ===
| Exit date | Position | No. | Player | To club | Fee | Ref. |
|---|---|---|---|---|---|---|
| 28 July 2025 | MF | 35 | (India) Jyoti Chouhan | (Israel) Bnot Netanya F.C. | Free Transfer | |
| 01 August 2026 | MF | 24 | (India) Deblina Bhattacharjee | (India) East Bengal | Free Transfer | |
