= 2022 SAFF U-18 Women's Championship =

- The official logo

Tournament details
- Host country: India
- Dates: 15–25 March 2022
- Teams: 3 (from 1 sub-confederation)
- Venue: 1 (in Jamshedpur host cities)

Final positions
- Champions: India (1st title)
- Runners-up: Bangladesh
- Third place: Nepal

Tournament statistics
- Matches played: 6
- Goals scored: 24 (4 per match)
- Attendance: 10,113 (1,686 per match)
- Top scorer(s): (India) Serto Lynda Kom (5 goals)
- Best player: (India) Serto Lynda Kom
- Fair play award: Bangladesh

The 2022 SAFF U-18 Women's Championship was the third edition of the SAFF U-18 Women's Championship, an international football competition for women's under–18 national teams organized by SAFF. The tournament was held from 15 to 25 March 2022 in Jamshedpur, India.

India won the title of the SAFF U–18 Women's Championship 2022 after finishing on the top table with nine points and with a superior goal difference over Bangladesh.

== Host selection ==
On 15 December 2021, AIFF declared to be the host of the tournament.

== Venue ==
All matches were held in Jamshedpur, Jharkhand, India.

Jamshedpur	Jamshedpur is located in India
JRD Tata Sports Complex	Jamshedpur is located in India
Capacity: 24,424	Jamshedpur is located in India

== Participating nations ==
Team	Appearances in the SAFF U-18 Women's Championship	Previous best performance
Bangladesh	3rd	Champions (2018, 2021)
India (Host)	3rd	Runners-up (2021)
Nepal	3rd	Runners-up (2018)

== Match officials ==
- (Bhutan) Choden Kizang
- (Bhutan) Choki Om
- (Sri Lanka) Yapa Appuhamilage Pabasara Minisarani

== Players eligibility ==
Players born on or after 1 January 2004 are eligible to compete in the tournament. Each team has to register a squad of minimum 16 players and maximum 23 players, minimum two of whom must be goalkeepers.

== Group stage ==
=== League table ===
Pos	Team	Pld	W	D	L	GF	GA	GD	Pts	Status
1	India (H)	4	3	0	1	13	2	+11	9	Champion
2	Bangladesh	4	3	0	1	7	4	+3	9	
3	Nepal	4	0	0	4	4	18	−14	0	

Source: SAFF
(H) Hosts

=== Matches ===
15 March 2022
19:00

India	7–0	Nepal
Priyanka Sujeesh 15'; Lynda Kom 17', 35'; Apurna Narzary 69'; Purnima Kumari 77'; Sumita Munda 87'; Nitu Linda 90+6'	Report (SAFF); Report (AIFF)

JRD Tata Sports Complex, Jamshedpur
Attendance: 2,000
Referee: Choki Om (Bhutan)

17 March 2022
19:00

Nepal	2–4	Bangladesh
Dipa Shahi 31'; Amisha Karki 90+3'	Report (SAFF)	Afeida Khandaker 2'; Mst Aklima Khatun 33'; Mst Eity Khatun 35'; Shaheda Akter Ripa 43'

JRD Tata Sports Complex, Jamshedpur
Attendance: 523
Referee: Pabasara Y. Minisarani (Sri Lanka)

19 March 2022
19:00

Bangladesh	0–1	India
	Report (SAFF); Report (AIFF)	Nitu Linda 63'

JRD Tata Sports Complex, Jamshedpur
Attendance: 856
Referee: Choki Om (Bhutan)

21 March 2022
19:00

Nepal	1–5	India
Sadipa Bholan 79'	Report (SAFF); Report (AIFF)	Shilky Devi Hemam 16'; Lynda Kom 23', 38', 61'; Anita Kumari 55'

JRD Tata Sports Complex, Jamshedpur
Attendance: 1,200
Referee: Pabasara Y. Minisarani (Sri Lanka)

23 March 2022
19:00

Bangladesh	2–1	Nepal
Shamsunnahar Jr. 69'; Shaheda Akter Ripa 83'	Report (SAFF)	Amisha Karki 4'

JRD Tata Sports Complex, Jamshedpur
Attendance: 300
Referee: Choden Kinzang (Bhutan)

25 March 2022
19:00

India	0–1	Bangladesh
	Report (SAFF); Report (AIFF)	Mst Aklima Khatun 74'

JRD Tata Sports Complex, Jamshedpur
Attendance: 5,234
Referee: Choki Om (Bhutan)

== Winners ==
2022 SAFF U-18 Women's Championship champions

India
First title

== Awards ==
The following awards were given at the conclusion of the tournament:

Top Goalscorer	Most Valuable Player	Fair Play award
(India) Serto Lynda Kom	(India) Serto Lynda Kom	Bangladesh

== Statistics ==
=== Goalscorers ===
There have been 24 goals scored in 6 matches, for an average of 4 goals per match.

5 goals

- (India) Serto Lynda Kom

2 goals

- (Bangladesh) Shaheda Akter Ripa
- (Bangladesh) Most Aklima Khatun
- (India) Nitu Linda
- (Nepal) Amisha Karki

1 goal

- (Bangladesh) Afeida Khandaker
- (Bangladesh) Mst Eity Khatun
- (Bangladesh) Shamsunnahar Jr.
- (India) Priyanka Sujeesh Pottekkat
- (India) Apurna Narzary
- (India) Hemam Shilky Devi
- (India) Anita Kumari
- (India) Purnima Kumari
- (India) Sumita Munda
- (Nepal) Sadipa Bholan
- (Nepal) Dipa Shahi

== See also ==
- 2022 SAFF Women's Championship
- 2022 SAFF U-15 Women's Championship
- 2022 SAFF U-20 Championship
- 2022 SAFF U-17 Championship
