= Mogini (surname) =

Mogini is a surname found in the Marma people and Magh people. Notable people with the surname include:

- Anuching Mogini (born 2003), Bangladeshi footballer, twin sister of Anai
- Anai Mogini (born 2003), Bangladeshi footballer
