= 2021 SAFF U-19 Women's Championship =

Tournament details
- Host country: Bangladesh
- Dates: 11–22 December
- Teams: 5 (from 1 sub-confederation)
- Venue: 1 (in Dhaka host cities)

Final positions
- Champions: Bangladesh (2nd title)
- Runners-up: India
- Third place: Nepal
- Fourth place: Bhutan

Tournament statistics
- Matches played: 11
- Goals scored: 44 (4 per match)
- Attendance: 49,303 (4,482 per match)
- Top scorer(s): (Bangladesh) Shaheda Akter Ripa (5 goals)
- Best player: (Bangladesh) Shaheda Akter Ripa
- Fair play award: Nepal

The 2021 SAFF U-19 Women's Championship was the second edition of the SAFF U-19 Women's Championship, an international football competition for women's under-19 national teams organized by SAFF. The tournament was held from 11 to 22 December 2021 at BSSS Mostafa Kamal Stadium, Dhaka in Bangladesh.

Bangladesh is the defending champion having defeated India 1–0 goals in the final of the tournament.

== Host selection ==
On 14 October 2021, SAFF members board meeting took place in Malé, Maldives, where Bangladesh was announced to be the host of the tournament.

== Venue ==
All matches were held at the BSSS Mostafa Kamal Stadium in Dhaka, Bangladesh.

Dhaka	Dhaka is located in Bangladesh
BSSS Mostafa Kamal Stadium	Dhaka is located in Bangladesh
Capacity: 25,000	Dhaka is located in Bangladesh

== Participating nations ==
FIFA suspended Pakistan Football Federation on 7 April 2021, so they cannot participate in this competition. Maldives withdrew from the tournament before the fixtures were finalised.

Team	Appearances in the SAFF U-19 Women's Championship	Previous best performance
Bangladesh (Host)	2nd	Champions (2018)
Bhutan	2nd	Fourth-place (2018)
India	2nd	Third-place (2018)
Nepal	2nd	Runners-up (2018)
Sri Lanka	1st	–

== Players eligibility ==
Players born on or after 1 January 2002 are eligible to compete in the tournament. Each team has to register a squad of minimum 16 players and maximum 23 players, minimum two of whom must be goalkeepers.

== Match officials ==
Referees

- (Bhutan) Tshering Yangkhey
- (Bangladesh) Jaya Chakma
- (India) Ruba Devi Gurusamy
- (Nepal) Anjana Rai
- (Sri Lanka) Pabasara Y. Minisarani

Assistant referees

- (Bangladesh) Salma Akter Mone
- (India) Reshmi Thapa Chhetri
- (Nepal) Bina Nawachhe Shrestha
- (Nepal) Meera Tamang
- (Sri Lanka) Malika Madhushani

== Group stage ==
Key to colours in group tables
Group winners and runners-up advance to the semi-finals

Tiebreakers

Teams are ranked according to points (3 points for a win, 1 point for a draw, 0 points for a loss), and if tied on points, the following tiebreaking criteria are applied, in the order given, to determine the rankings.

1. Points in head-to-head matches among tied teams;
2. Goal difference in head-to-head matches among tied teams;
3. Goals scored in head-to-head matches among tied teams;
4. If more than two teams are tied, and after applying all head-to-head criteria above, a subset of teams are still tied, all head-to-head criteria above are reapplied exclusively to this subset of teams;
5. Goal difference in all group matches;
6. Goals scored in all group matches;
7. Penalty shoot-out if only two teams are tied and they met in the last round of the group;
8. Disciplinary points (yellow card = 1 point, red card as a result of two yellow cards = 3 points, direct red card = 3 points, yellow card followed by direct red card = 4 points);
9. Drawing of lots.

=== Standings ===
Pos	Team	Pld	W	D	L	GF	GA	GD	Pts	Status
1	Bangladesh (H)	4	3	1	0	19	0	+19	10	Advance to the Final
2	India	4	3	0	1	9	1	+8	9	Advance to the Final
3	Nepal	4	2	1	1	10	1	+9	7	
4	Bhutan	4	1	0	3	5	13	−8	3	
5	Sri Lanka	4	0	0	4	0	28	−28	0	

Source: Global Sports Archive
(H) Hosts

=== Matches ===
11 December 2021
15:00 UTC+6:00

Bhutan	5–0	Sri Lanka
Pema Yangzom 21', 23'; Tshering Choden 28'; Sonam Lhamo 45'; Tharmika Sivaneswaran 85' (o.g.)	SAFF; GSA

BSSS Mostafa Kamal Stadium, Dhaka
Attendance: 250
Referee: Jaya Chakma (Bangladesh)
11 December 2021
19:00 UTC+6:00

Bangladesh	0–0	Nepal
	SAFF; GSA

BSSS Mostafa Kamal Stadium, Dhaka
Attendance: 500
Referee: Ruba Devi Gurusamy (India)

13 December 2021
15:00 UTC+6:00

Bhutan	0–6	Bangladesh
	SAFF; GSA	Tohura 2', 45+3'; Ripa 41', 47'; Ritu 69'; Maria 90+2'

BSSS Mostafa Kamal Stadium, Dhaka
Attendance: 492
Referee: Pabasara Y. Minisarani (Sri Lanka)
13 December 2021
19:00 UTC+6:00

India	5–0	Sri Lanka
Santosh 2'; Karen Estrocio 5'; N. Linda 9', 41'; Priyangka 82'	Report

BSSS Mostafa Kamal Stadium, Dhaka
Attendance: 372
Referee: Tshering Yangkhey (Bhutan)

15 December 2021
15:00 UTC+6:00

Nepal	6–0	Sri Lanka
Rashmi Kumari Ghising 5', 85'; Sabita Rana Magar 7'; Menuka Magar 43'; Rajani Thokar 48'; Saloni Rana Magar 53'	SAFF; GSA

BSSS Mostafa Kamal Stadium, Dhaka
Attendance: 150
Referee: Tshering Yangkhey (Bhutan)
15 December 2021
19:00 UTC+6:00

India	3–0	Bhutan
Sumati 7'; Priyangka 41', 53'	SAFF; GSA

BSSS Mostafa Kamal Stadium, Dhaka
Attendance: 250
Referee: Anjana Rai (Nepal)

17 December 2021
15:00 UTC+6:00

Bangladesh	1–0	India
Shamsunnahar 7'	SAFF; GSA

BSSS Mostafa Kamal Stadium, Dhaka
Attendance: 1743
Referee: Pabasara Y. Minisarani (Sri Lanka
17 December 2021
19:00 UTC+6:00

Nepal	4–0	Bhutan
Menuka Magar 2', 72'; Kusum Khatiwada 18'; Rajani Thokar 21'	SAFF; GSA

BSSS Mostafa Kamal Stadium, Dhaka
Attendance: 873
Referee: Ruba Devi Gurusamy (India)

19 December 2021
15:00 UTC+6:00

India	1–0	Nepal
Priyangka 67'	SAFF; GSA

BSSS Mostafa Kamal Stadium, Dhaka
Attendance: 276
Referee: Jaya Chakma (Bangladesh)
19 December 2021
19:00 UTC+6:00

Sri Lanka	0–12	Bangladesh
	SAFF; GSA	Anuching 2', 77'; Ritu 7', 43'; Ripa 16', 49', 87'; Akhi 47'; Afeida 54', 70', 83'; Unnoti Khatun 84'

BSSS Mostafa Kamal Stadium, Dhaka
Attendance: 1233
Referee: Anjana Rai (Nepal)

== Final ==
22 December 2021
18:00 UTC+6:00

Bangladesh	1–0	India
Mogini 80'	SAFF; GSA

BSSS Mostafa Kamal Stadium, Dhaka
Attendance: 8125
Referee: Anjana Rai (Nepal)

== Winners ==
2021 SAFF U-19 Women's Championship champions

Bangladesh
Second title

== Awards ==
The following awards were given at the conclusion of the tournament:

Top Goalscorer	Most Valuable Player	Fair Play award
(Bangladesh) Shaheda Akter Ripa	(Bangladesh) Shaheda Akter Ripa	Nepal

== Statistics ==
=== Goalscorers ===
There have been 44 goals scored in 11 matches, for an average of 4 goals per match.

5 goals

- (Bangladesh) Shaheda Akter Ripa

4 goals

- (India) Naorem Priyangka Devi

3 goals

- (Bangladesh) Afeida Khandaker
- (Bangladesh) Ritu Porna Chakma
- (Nepal) Menuka Kumari Ale Magar

2 goals

- (Bangladesh) Anuching Mogini
- (Bangladesh) Tohura Khatun
- (Bhutan) Pema Yangzom
- (India) Nitu Linda
- (Nepal) Reshmi Kumari Ghishing
- (Nepal) Rajani Thokar

1 goal

- (Bangladesh) Anai Mogini
- (Bangladesh) Maria Manda
- (Bangladesh) Unnoti Khatun
- (Bangladesh) Akhi Khatun
- (Bangladesh) Shamsunnahar
- (Bhutan) Sonam Lhamo
- (Bhutan) Tshering Choden
- (India) Karen Estrocio
- (India) Sumati Kumari
- (India) Santosh
- (Nepal) Kusum Khatiwada
- (Nepal) Sabita Rana Magar
- (Nepal) Saloni Ranamagar

1 own goal

- (Sri Lanka) Subhashi Madhushani (against Bhutan)
