= Nitu Linda =

Indian footballer

Personal information
- Date of birth: 5 June 2006 (age 20)
- Place of birth: Ranchi, Jharkhand, India
- Position: Midfielder

Team information
- Current team: United Kolkata SC

Senior career*
Years	Team	Apps	(Gls)
- Jharkhand
2023–2025	Sribhumi		
2025–	United Kolkata SC		

International career^{‡}
2020	India U17		
2021–2024	India U20		
2024–	India	1	(0)
- * Club domestic league appearances and goals ‡ National team caps and goals as of 30 December 2024

Nitu Linda (born 5 April 2006) is an Indian professional footballer from Jharkhand who plays as a midfielder for the Indian Women's League 2 club United Kolkata SC and the India national football team.

== Early life ==
Linda is from Ranchi, Jharkhand. Her father's name is Soharai Oraon. She has two elder sisters and three brothers. One of her brothers, Dhaneswar Oraon, who works in brick kilns, encouraged her to play football and supported her. In 2018, her mother died and she had to manage the house. So she used to double up working in the fields and the brick kilns.

== Career ==
Linda was selected in the 23-player Indian squad by Indian coach Joakim Alexandersson and she played the second of the two FIFA international friendlies against Maldives on January 2 at the Padukone-Dravid Centre for Sports Excellence in Bengaluru.

She was selected to play the 2020 Under 17 Women's World Cup which was delayed due to COVID-19 pandemic. In 2021, she playe the SAFF U-19 Women's Championship in Bangladesh. In 2022, she was part of the Indian team at the SAFF U-18 Women's Championship in Jamshedpur. In February 2023, she also played the SAFF U-20 Women's Championship in Dhaka. In February 2024, she captained the Indian team that jointly won the SAFF Under 19 Women's Championship 2024 at Dhaka, Bangladesh.

== Career statistics ==
=== International ===
As of 30 December 2024

National team	Year	Caps	Goals
India	2024	1	0
Total		1	0
