= 2009 AFC U-19 Women's Championship qualification =

Tournament details
- Teams: 11 (from 1 confederation)

This article include details of 2009 AFC U-19 Women's Championship qualification.

Five of the 11 teams qualified.

== Group A ==
All matches were held at Shah Alam and Kuala Lumpur, Malaysia (UTC+8).

Team	Pld	W	D	L	GF	GA	GD	Pts
South Korea	5	5	0	0	66	0	+66	15
Vietnam	5	4	0	1	33	6	+27	12
Myanmar	5	3	0	2	22	11	+11	9
Jordan	5	2	0	3	17	21	−4	6
Philippines	5	1	0	4	2	42	−40	3
Singapore	5	0	0	5	2	62	−60	0

28 October 2008
16:00

Jordan	0–11	South Korea
	Report	Lee Sae-yum 6', 56'; Kim Na-rae 21'; Hyun Hye-ji 30', 55'; Jung Hae-in 64', 69', 77'; Kwon Eun-som 67', 90'; Kim Jin-young 81'

Shah Alam Stadium, Shah Alam
Attendance: 30
Referee: Bentla D'Coth (India)
28 October 2008
18:30

Vietnam	12–0	Singapore
Trần Thị Thu 4', 65', 84'; Lê Thu Thanh Hương 10', 39'; Nguyễn Thị Hòa 30', 45'; Phùng Thị Nhung 54'; Hoàng Minh Thu 56'; Trịnh Ngọc Hoa 72'; Nguyễn Thị Hương 87'; Nguyễn Hương Giang 89'	Report

Shah Alam Stadium, Shah Alam
Attendance: 20
Referee: Charymurat Kurbanov (Turkmenistan)
28 October 2008
16:00

Myanmar	8–0	Philippines
Moe Sandar Aung 7', 29', 30'; Su Pyay Mon 19', 60' (pen.); San Ei Phyu 43'; Nan Kham Mo 67', 71'	Report

KLFA Stadium, Kuala Lumpur
Attendance: 50
Referee: Võ Minh Trí (Vietnam)

30 October 2008
16:00

South Korea	20–0	Philippines
Kim Na-rae 8' (pen.); Kang Yu-mi 14', 15', 42'; Kim Hye-ri 27', 64'; Kong Hye-won 28', 30', 62'; Park Sung-eun 34'; Lee Sae-yum 49', 58', 69'; Kim Jin-young 55', 81'; Kwon Eun-som 70', 75', 82'; Moon Mi-ra 78', 84'	Report

Shah Alam Stadium, Shah Alam
Attendance: 20
Referee: Dilovarshokh Orzuev (Tajikistan)
30 October 2008
18:30

Myanmar	0–4	Vietnam
	Report	Nguyễn Thị Nguyệt 9'; Nguyễn Thị Hòa 12'; Phùng Thị Nhung 16'; Trần Thị Thu 85'

Shah Alam Stadium, Shah Alam
Attendance: 20
Referee: Bentla D'Coth (India)
30 October 2008
16:00

Jordan	13–1	Singapore
Al-Nahar 17', 19', 40', 75', 82', 90'; Al-Masri 21', 77'; Al-Majali 27', 35'; Jebreen 73'; Mohammad Al-Hyasat 90'	Report	Charmaine 79'

KLFA Stadium, Kuala Lumpur
Attendance: 30
Referee: Praew Semaksuk (Thailand)

1 November 2008
16:00

Philippines	0–2	Jordan
	Report	Amin Al-Masri 38', 47'

Shah Alam Stadium, Shah Alam
Attendance: 20
Referee: Praew Semaksuk (Thailand)
1 November 2008
18:30

Singapore	0–11	Myanmar
	Report	Moe Sandar Aung 3', 61', 66', 90'; Khin Mar Lin 11'; Zin Mar Win 13', 62'; Yei Yei Oo 22'; Nan Kham Mo 30', 75'; Su Mon Aung 69'

Shah Alam Stadium, Shah Alam
Attendance: 20
Referee: Chaitali Paul (India)
1 November 2008

South Korea	6–0	Vietnam
Park Sung-eun 15'; Lim Seon-joo 39'; Lee Sae-yum 46'; Jung Hae-in 55', 71'; Kang Yu-mi 90+1'	Report

KLFA Stadium, Kuala Lumpur
Attendance: 30
Referee: Bentla D'Coth (India)

4 November 2008
16:00

Vietnam	11–0	Philippines
Phùng Thị Nhung 13', 74', 79', 86'; Trần Thị Thu 61', 72', 87'; Nguyễn Thị Nguyệt 68', 77', 85', 90'	Report

Shah Alam Stadium, Shah Alam
Attendance: 30
Referee: Chaitali Paul (India)
4 November 2008
18:30

Singapore	0–24	South Korea
	Report	Kim Jin-young 5', 40', 76'; Moon Mi-ra 10', 74', 88'; Kong Hye-won 12', 18', 20', 25'; Kim Pur-eun 17'; Park Sung-eun 21', 27', 46', 66', 67'; Kim Na-rae 24', 32', 55', 86'; Choe Jeon-hui 34'; Lee Eun-ji 45'; Kim Hye-ri 70', 81'

Shah Alam Stadium, Shah Alam
Attendance: 20
Referee: Charymurat Kurbanov (Turkmenistan)
4 November 2008
16:00

Myanmar	3–2	Jordan
Nan Kham Mo 16'; Su Pyay Mon 28'; Yei Yei Oo 45+2'	Report	Mahmoud Jebreen 2'; Al-Majali 63'

KLFA Stadium, Kuala Lumpur
Attendance: 20
Referee: Dilovarshokh Orzuev (Tajikistan)

6 November 2008
16:00

Philippines	2–1	Singapore
Mara Krstia 10', 61'	Report	Binte Jeilani 68' (pen.)

Shah Alam Stadium, Shah Alam
Attendance: 30
Referee: Võ Minh Trí (Vietnam)
6 November 2008
18:30

Jordan	0–6	Vietnam
	Report	Nguyễn Thị Nguyệt 5'; Hoàng Minh Thu 13'; Phùng Thị Nhung 33'; Nguyễn Thị Hòa 35'; Lê Thu Thanh Hương 62'; Phạm Thị Hằng 65'

Shah Alam Stadium, Shah Alam
Attendance: 20
Referee: Praew Semaksuk (Thailand)
6 November 2008
16:00

South Korea	5–0	Myanmar
Kim Na-rae 13' (pen.); Kang Yu-mi 40'; Kwon Eun-som 59'; Lim Seon-joo 75'; Kong Hye-won 90+2'	Report

KLFA Stadium, Kuala Lumpur
Attendance: 50
Referee: Bentla D'Coth (India)

== Group B ==
All matches were held at Kuala Lumpur, Malaysia (UTC+8).

Team	Pld	W	D	L	GF	GA	GD	Pts
Thailand	4	4	0	0	20	2	+18	12
Australia	4	3	0	1	28	2	+18	9
Chinese Taipei	4	2	0	2	10	6	+4	6
Iran	4	1	0	3	5	16	−11	3
India	4	0	0	4	1	38	−37	0

29 October 2008
16:00

Chinese Taipei	0–3	Australia
	Report	Pam Simon 35', 43'; Ella Jade 58'

KLFA Stadium, Kuala Lumpur
Attendance: 50
Referee: Rita Gani (Malaysia)
29 October 2008
18:30

India	1–4	Iran
Snehal Dilip 59'	Report	Parvin 2'; Zahra 26', 90+1'; Fazeli Shiva 38'

KLFA Stadium, Kuala Lumpur
Attendance: 90
Referee: Shen Huang Ying (China PR)

31 October 2008
16:00

Chinese Taipei	2–1	Iran
Wu Shih-ping 17'; Lin Kai-ling 83'	Report	Yeganeh 13'

KLFA Stadium, Kuala Lumpur
Attendance: 30
Referee: Li Hong (China PR)
31 October 2008
18:30

Thailand	9–0	India
Dangda Taneekarn 4', 67'; Nisa Romyen 11', 21', 71', 85'; Tonglek Kanokwan 27'; Saengchan Khwanrudi 31'; Darika Peanpailun 69'	Report

KLFA Stadium, Kuala Lumpur
Attendance: 40
Referee: Niu Hui Jun (China PR)

2 November 2008
16:00

Australia	18–0	India
Polias Teresa 7'; May Kerr 9', 14'; Sophie Charlotte 13', 20', 48', 69'; Sykes 22', 27', 37', 43'; Racheal Nicole 33', 52', 79'; Bronwyn Grace 78'; Pam Simon 80'; Karina Lee 83' van-Egmond 90+1'	Report

KLFA Stadium, Kuala Lumpur
Attendance: 20
Referee: Shen Huang Ying (China PR)
2 November 2008
18:30

Iran	0–7	Thailand
	Report	Darika Peanpailun 15', 39'; Nisa Romyen 16', 19'; Dangda Taneekarn 44'; Sailom Pittayanukulsup 51'; Thongsombut Rattikan 89'

KLFA Stadium, Kuala Lumpur
Attendance: 80
Referee: Rita Gani (Malaysia)

5 November 2008
16:00

Thailand	2–1	Chinese Taipei
Nisa Romyen 2'; Thongsombut Rattikan 79'	Report	Yu Hsiu-chin 28'

KLFA Stadium, Kuala Lumpur
Attendance: 50
Referee: Niu Hui Jun (China PR)
5 November 2008
18:30

Iran	0–6	Australia
	Report	Marianna 5'; Pam Simon 11', 44' van-Egmond 70'; Butt 79'; May Kerr 90+1'

KLFA Stadium, Kuala Lumpur
Attendance: 50
Referee: Rita Gani (Malaysia)

7 November 2008
16:00

Australia	1–2	Thailand
Nicole 25'	Report	Thongsombut Rattikan 27'; Sailom Pittayanukulsup 47'

KLFA Stadium, Kuala Lumpur
Attendance: 40
Referee: Shen Huang Ying (China PR)
7 November 2008
18:30

Chinese Taipei	7–0	India
Lin Ya-han 18', 88'; Chen Yen-ping 19', 57'; Yang Ya-han 21', 54'; Lin Kai-ling 63'	Report

KLFA Stadium, Kuala Lumpur
Attendance: 100
Referee: Li Hong (China PR)

=== Ranking of third-placed teams ===
Team	Pld	W	D	L	GF	GA	GD	Pts
Chinese Taipei	4	2	0	2	10	6	+4	6
Myanmar	4	2	0	2	11	11	0	6

- Note: Myanmar's match against sixth-placed team Singapore was excluded.

== Qualified nations ==
- South Korea: Qualification Group A winners
- Vietnam: Qualification Group A runner-up
- Thailand: Qualification Group B winners
- Australia: Qualification Group B runner-up
- Chinese Taipei: Qualification Group B third-placed

=== Automatically qualified teams ===
- North Korea (Defending champions)
- Japan (2007 runners-up)
- China (2007 3rd place)
