= 2007 AFC U-19 Women's Championship qualification =

Tournament details
- Teams: 9 (from 1 confederation)

This article include details of 2007 AFC U-19 Women's Championship qualification. It was held from 7 to 15 November 2006.

== Group A ==
All matches were held at Kuala Lumpur, Malaysia (UTC+8).

Team	Pld	W	D	L	GF	GA	GD	Pts
Thailand	4	3	1	0	30	4	+26	10
Myanmar	4	3	1	0	18	5	+13	10
India	4	2	0	2	13	7	+6	6
Jordan	4	1	0	3	7	11	–4	3
Singapore	4	0	0	4	1	42	–41	0

7 November 2006
16:30

Thailand	17–0	Singapore
Chawong 2', 21', 48', 54', 70'; Srangthaisong 18', 66'; Peangthem 25', 30', 36', 44'; Sornsai 43', 45+2', 50', 55', 65'	Report

KLFA Stadium, Kuala Lumpur
Attendance: 50
Referee: Rita Ghani (Malaysia)
7 November 2006
19:00

Jordan	0–4	India
	Report	Devi Ngangom 3', 35', 58', 81'

KLFA Stadium, Kuala Lumpur
Attendance: 50
Referee: Li Hong (China PR)

9 November 2006
16:30

India	1–2	Myanmar
Hmar 80'	Report	Khin Marlar Tun 18'; Khin Moe Wai 21'

KLFA Stadium, Kuala Lumpur
Attendance: 100
Referee: Zhang Dongqing (China PR)
9 November 2006
19:00

Jordan	0–5	Thailand
	Report	Kertsombun 2'; Sornsai 5', 42'; Wiphakonwit 28'; Peangthem 62'

KLFA Stadium, Kuala Lumpur
Attendance: 0
Referee: Krystyna Helena Szokolai (Australia)

11 November 2006
16:30

Myanmar	2–0	Jordan
Thandar Moe 17'; Su Nyein Aye 40'	Report

KLFA Stadium, Kuala Lumpur
Attendance: 50
Referee: Li Hong (China PR)
11 November 2006
19:00

Singapore	0–7	India
	Report	Maibam Bembem 9', 63'; Bala Devi 12'; Hmar 69', 82'; Chettri Anuradha 81', 90' (pen.)

KLFA Stadium, Kuala Lumpur
Attendance: 100
Referee: Rita Ghani (Malaysia)

13 November 2006
16:30

Singapore	0–7	Jordan
	Report	Khraisat Samaa 16', 47', 53'; Jbarah Maysa 39', 41'; Jebreen Shahnaz 74', 79'

KLFA Stadium, Kuala Lumpur
Attendance: 50
Referee: Zhang Dongqing (China PR)
13 November 2006
19:00

Thailand	3–3	Myanmar
Shwe Sin Aung 25' (o.g.); Pitsamai Sornsai 36', 84'	Report	May Thet Phyu 77'; Aye Aye Khaing 80' (pen.); Ei Ei Phyo 90+1'

KLFA Stadium, Kuala Lumpur
Attendance: 100
Referee: Krystyna Helena Szokolai (Australia)

15 November 2006
16:30

India	1–5	Thailand
Maibam Bembem 61'	Report	Sunisa Srangthaisong 2' (pen.), 4', 50', 72'; Pitsamai Sornsai 25'

KLFA Stadium, Kuala Lumpur
Attendance: 50
Referee: Rita Ghani (Malaysia)
15 November 2006
19:00

Myanmar	11–1	Singapore
Lo Wer Phaw 15', 61', 76'; Khin Moe Wai 29', 68'; Khin Marlar Tun 33', 63', 79'; Aye Aye Khaing 49'; Mu Mu Lwin 54'; Ang Xian Qing 82' (o.g.)	Report	Shamini Anbarazan 65'

KLFA Stadium, Kuala Lumpur
Attendance: 100
Referee: Li Hong (China PR)

== Group B ==
All matches were held at Taipei, Taiwan (UTC+8).

Team	Pts	Pld	W	D	L	GF	GA	GD
Chinese Taipei	9	3	3	0	0	14	0	+14
Vietnam	6	3	2	0	1	6	1	+5
Guam	3	3	1	0	2	3	8	−5
Hong Kong	0	3	0	0	3	0	14	−14

2006-11-08

Chinese Taipei	1–0	Vietnam

Zhongshan Soccer Stadium, Taipei

2006-11-08

Guam	3–0	Hong Kong

Zhongshan Soccer Stadium, Taipei

2006-11-10

Vietnam	3–0	Guam

Zhongshan Soccer Stadium, Taipei

2006-11-10

Chinese Taipei	8–0	Hong Kong

Zhongshan Soccer Stadium, Taipei

2006-11-12

Chinese Taipei	5–0	Guam

Zhongshan Soccer Stadium, Taipei

2006-11-12

Vietnam	3–0	Hong Kong

Zhongshan Soccer Stadium, Taipei
