= Juhi Singh =

Indian footballer (born 2007)

Personal information
- Date of birth: 29 July 2007 (age 19)
- Place of birth: Delhi, India
- Position: Defender

Team information
- Current team: Garhwal United
- Number: 3

Senior career*
Years	Team	Apps	(Gls)
- Kickstart
- Eves SC
2025–	Garhwal United		

International career^{‡}
2023	India U17		
2024	India U20	3	(0)
2025–	India	1	(0)
- * Club domestic league appearances and goals ‡ National team caps and goals as of 2 January 2025

Juhi Singh (born 29 July 2007) is an Indian professional footballer from Delhi, who plays as a defender for the Indian Women's League club Garhwal United and the India national football team.

== Early life and education ==
Singh is from Delhi. She did her schooling at Tagore International School, East of Kailash, Delhi. She started with the Eves Soccer Club in Delhi and also played for Delhi state team.

== Career ==
She was selected among the Indian probables for the National camp ahead of the friendlies against Maldives. She made her senior India debut in the second FIFA friendly against Maldives at the Padukone-Dravid Centre for Sports Excellence on 1 January 2025. She came off the bench to score her first goal for India.

In February 2023, she was selected for the Indian under–17 women's football team to play the two friendlies against Jordan in Jordan. In April 2023, she was also part of the Indian team for the AFC U–17 Women's Asian Cup Qualifiers Round 1 at Bishkek, Kyrgyz Republic on 26 April and against Myanmar on 28 April. In July 2023, she was also part of the 33 probables selected for the National camp at Indore under chief coach Priya PV, in preparation for the AFC U–17 Women's Asian Cup Qualifiers Round 2. She played the Round 2 qualifier at Buriram City Stadium on 21 September 2023 coming off the bench in the 73rd minute. India lost 0–4 against Thailand.

== Career statistics ==
=== International ===
As of 2 January 2025

National team	Year	Caps	Goals
India	2025	1	0
Total		1	0
