= Bhumika Devi Khumukcham =

Indian footballer

Bhumika Devi
Personal information
- Full name: Bhumika Devi Khumukcham
- Date of birth: 15 February 2007 (age 19)
- Place of birth: Manipur, India
- Position: Midfielder

Team information
- Current team: Nita
- Number: 11

Senior career*
Years	Team	Apps	(Gls)
–2025	FC Imphal		
2025–	Nita		

International career^{‡}
2025–	India U20	9	(1)
2025–	India	1	(1)
- * Club domestic league appearances and goals ‡ National team caps and goals as of 2 January 2025

Bhumika Devi Khumukcham (Meitei: Khumukcham Bhumika Devi, born 15 February 2007) is an Indian professional footballer from Manipur. She plays as a midfielder for the Indian Women's League club Nita and the India women's national football team.

== Early life ==
She hails from Manipur.

== Career ==
Devi was selected in the 23-player Indian squad by Indian coach Joakim Alexandersson and she played the second of the two FIFA international friendlies against Maldives on January 2 at the Padukone-Dravid Centre for Sports Excellence in Bengaluru. She made her senior India debut in the second match against Maldives.

In June 2022, she played for Manipur in the Hero Junior Under 17 Women's National Football Championship at Indira Gandhi Athletic Stadium, Guwahati.

She scored a goal against Chinese Taipei in India's 3–1 victory in the final match of the group stage at the 2026 AFC U-20 Women's Asian Cup.

== Career statistics ==
=== International ===
As of 2 January 2025

National team	Year	Caps	Goals
India	2025	1	1
Total		1	1

Scores and results list India's goal tally first.

List of international goals scored by Bhumika Devi
No.	Date	Venue	Opponent	Score	Result	Competition
1.	2 January 2025	Padukone – Dravid Centre for Sports Excellence, Bengaluru, India	Maldives	11–1	11–1	Friendly
