= Anai Mogini =

Bangladeshi footballer

Personal information
- Date of birth: 1 March 2003 (age 23)
- Place of birth: Khagrachhari
- Position: Right-back

Youth career
- 2012: Mogachori Primary School
- 2013–2021: Ghagra Bohumukhi High School
- Suehlamong FA

Senior career*
Years	Team	Apps	(Gls)
2021–2022	Bashundhara Kings		

International career^{‡}
2016	Bangladesh U-14	4	(1)
2016–2019	Bangladesh U16	2	(0)
2021–2022	Bangladesh U19	5	(1)
2018	Bangladesh futsal	3	(0)
Medal record
Women's football
Representing Bangladesh
SAFF Women's Championship
Winner	2022 Nepal
SAFF U-20 Women's Championship
Winner	2021 Bangladesh
Bangamata U-19 Women's International Gold Cup
Winner	2019 Bangladesh
AFC U-14 Girls' Regional C'ship – South and Central
Winner	2016 Bangladesh	Bangladesh U14
- * Club domestic league appearances and goals as of 9 December 2020 ‡ National team caps and goals as of 19 September 2022

Anai Mogini (Bengali: আনাই মগিনি; born 1 March 2003) was a Bangladeshi women's football defender who played as a right-back for Bashundhara Kings.

She has also played for the Bangladesh women's national futsal team.

== Early years ==
Anai Mogini was born in 2003 in Khagrachhari district. Her father, Ripru Magh, is a farmer. He sells traditional herbal medicine. Her mother's name is Apruma Mogini. She studied at Ghagra Bohumukhi High School in Rangamati district.

== Early career ==
Mogini started playing football in 2011. She played in the Bangamata Sheikh Fazilatunnesa Mujib Gold Cup Football Tournament for Mogachori Primary School, Rangamati, which was an annual national youth football for girls. The team became the champion in 2012. She represented Rangamati in the KFC national women's championship in 2014 as her home district, Khagrachhari, was not taking part in the competition. Anai Mogini also played for her school, Ghagra Bohumukhi High School, where she helped her team to become runners-up in Bangamata Sheikh Fazilatunnesa Mujib Gold Cup Football Tournament in 2013, 2014, and 2015.

== International career ==
Mogini was a member of the AFC U-14 Girls' Regional Championship – South and Central winning team in 2016 in Tajikistan., where scored a goal.

She was selected to the Bangladesh U17 team for the 2017 AFC U-16 Women's Championship qualification – Group C matches. She played for the first time at the tournament in the match against Kyrgyzstan U17 on 31 August 2016. Being group C champion, Bangladesh qualified for the 2017 AFC U-16 Women's Championship in Thailand in September 2017.

== Personal life ==
Mogini is the older twin sister of Anuching Mogini, who also plays football.

== Honours ==
AFC U-14 Girls' Regional C'ship – South and Central
Bangladesh U-14 Girls'

- Champion: 2016

Bangladesh U-20

- SAFF Women's Championship: 2021
