= Aruna Bag =

Indian female football player

Personal information
- Full name: Aruna Bag
- Date of birth: 27 April 2003 (age 23)
- Place of birth: Kalna, West Bengal, India
- Position: Defender

Team information
- Current team: Kickstart
- Number: 17

Senior career*
| Years | Team | Apps | (Gls) |
| – | Behala Aikya Sammilani | | |
| – | West Bengal Police SC | | |
| 2020–2022 | Sribhumi | | |
| 2022– | Kickstart | | |

International career^{‡}
| 2024– | India | 9 | (0) |
- * Club domestic league appearances and goals ‡ National team caps and goals as of 26 February 2025

Aruna Bag (born 27 April 2003) is an Indian professional footballer from West Bengal who plays as a defender for the Indian Women's League club Kickstart and the India national football team. She has also represented West Bengal and Karnataka in the Rajmata Jijabai Trophy.

== Early life ==
Bag is from Kalna, Purba Bardhaman district, West Bengal. Her father runs a cycle repair shop and her mother is a home maker. Till the age of 18, she used to play many games including cricket, football and kabaddi. But she chose football, when her teacher asked her to decide between kabaddi and football for the School National Games. She used to practice at the Asansol football ground, a five-hour journey from Kalna, on week-ends. Within three years, she made her debut in the Senior Indian team.

== Career ==
She played for Sreebhumi Football Club, West Bengal Police Sports Club and Behala Aikya Sammilani before joining Kickstart. After two seasons at Kickstart, she was selected for the India women's national football team. In June 2024, she made her debut during the Uzbekistan tour. She played the Senior National women's football championship in 2022-23 and also played the Indian Women's League in the same year. On 29 December 2024, she was selected in the 23-member squad for the FIFA International friendlies against Maldives on 30 December and 2 January at the Padukone-Dravid Centre for Sports Excellence in Bengaluru. She is also named among the 32 probables for camp ahead of the Pink Ladies Cup to be played in Dubai from 20 to 26 February 2025.

== Career statistics ==
=== International ===
As of 26 February 2025

| National team | Year | Caps | Goals |
|---|---|---|---|
| India | 2024 | 7 | 0 |
| India | 2025 | 2 | 0 |
| Total | | 9 | 0 |
