= Anuching Mogini =

Bangladeshi footballer

Personal information
- Date of birth: 1 March 2003 (age 23)
- Place of birth: Khagrachhari
- Position: Forward

Youth career
- 2013–2021: Ghagra Bohumukhi High School
- Suehlamong FA

Senior career*
Years	Team	Apps	(Gls)
2020	Nasrin	12	(3)
2021–2022	ARB College	13	(14)

International career^{‡}
2016	Bangladesh U-14	4	(5)
2016–2019	Bangladesh U-16	4	(5)
2021–2022	Bangladesh U-19	4	(2)
2016–2022	Bangladesh	3	(0)
Medal record
Women's football
Representing Bangladesh
SAFF Women's Championship
Winner	2022 Nepal
Runner-up	2016 India
SAFF U-20 Women's Championship
Winner	2018 Bhutan
Winner	2021 Bangladesh
Bangamata U-19 Women's International Gold Cup
Winner	2019 Bangladesh
AFC U-14 Girls' Regional C'ship – South and Central
Winner	2016 Bangladesh	Bangladesh U14
- * Club domestic league appearances and goals as of 9 December 2020 ‡ National team caps and goals as of 19 September 2022

Anuching Mogini (Bengali: আনুচিং মগিনি; born 1 March 2003) is a Bangladeshi professional women's football forward.

Mogini was a member of the AFC U-14 Girls' Regional Championship – South and Central winning team in 2016 in Tajikistan., where she scored five goals in that tournament. She is the younger twin sister of Anai Mogini, who also plays football.

== Early years ==
Anuching Mogini was born in 2003 in Khagrachhari district. Her father, Ripru Magh, is a farmer. She studied at Ghagra Bohumukhi High School in Rangamati district.

== Early career ==
Anuching Mogini started playing football in 2011. She played in the Bangamata Sheikh Fazilatunnesa Mujib Gold Cup Football Tournament for Mogachori Primary School, where her team became the champion that year. She represented Narayanganj in the KFC national women's championship in 2014 as her home district, Khagrachhari, was not taking part in the competition.

== International career ==
Anuching Mogini was selected to the Bangladesh women's U-17 team for the 2017 AFC U-16 Women's Championship qualification – Group C matches. She scored five goals in that tournament. Being group C champion, Bangladesh have qualified for the 2017 AFC U-16 Women's Championship in Thailand in September 2017.

== Honours ==
AFC U-14 Girls' Regional C'ship – South and Central
Bangladesh U-14 Girls'

- Champion: 2016

Bangladesh U-20

- SAFF Women's Championship: 2021
