= Joakim Alexandersson =

Swedish footballer (born 1976)

Personal information
- Full name: Joakim Bernt Alexandersson
- Date of birth: 27 January 1976 (age 50)
- Place of birth: Borås, Sweden
- Height: 1.90 m (6 ft 3 in)
- Position: Defender

Senior career*
Years	Team	Apps	(Gls)
- Dalstorps IF
1994–2006	IF Elfsborg		
2006–2008	Aalesund	15	(0)
2007	→ Skeid (loan)	6	(0)
2008	Mjällby AIF	3	(0)
2009–2010	Dalstorps IF		
2011	Grimsås IF	20	(3)
2012–2013	Bollebygds IF	16	(3)

International career
1998	Sweden U21	1	(0)

Managerial career
- 2009−2011: Dalstorps IF (assistant)
- 2011: Grimsås IF
- 2012−2013: Bollebygds IF
- 2018−2020: IF Elfsborg (youth)
- 2024−2025: India Women U17
- 2024−: India Women U20
- 2024: India Women (interim)
- 2025−: Indian Arrows Women
- 2026−: India Women U17
- * Club domestic league appearances and goals

Joakim Bernt Alexandersson (born 27 January 1976) is a Swedish football manager and former footballer who played as a defender. He currently serves as the head coach of the India U20 and India U17 women's football teams. He also served as the interim head coach of the India women's national football team.

A youth product of Dalstorps IF, Alexandersson spent the majority of his career with IF Elfsborg, with whom he made 175 Allsvenskan appearances, won the Svenska Cupen twice, played in the UEFA Cup, and was the club's player of the year in 1999. He spent two years in Norwegian football with Aalesund, with whom he gained promotion to and played in the 2007 Tippeligaen, and on loan to Skeid. He returned to Sweden for a brief spell in the Superettan with Mjällby AIF before five years playing and coaching in the regional leagues of Västergötland. He was capped once for Sweden at under-21 level.

== Early life and IF Elfsborg career ==
Alexandersson was born in Borås, Sweden, in 1976. As a youngster he played football with Dalstorps IF, and he joined the main club in Borås, IF Elfsborg, as an 18-year-old in 1994. He was a member of the squad that gained promotion from the second tier in 1996, and in a nine-year spell, between 1997 and 2005, scored seven goals from 175 Allsvenskan appearances, 167 as a starter. In January 1998, he won his only cap for Sweden under-21s, in a 1–1 friendly draw with Ethiopia. The following year, he was chosen as IF Elfsborg's player of the year.

He was on the winning side in two Svenska Cupen finals. Elfsborg beat AIK in 2001 in a lengthy penalty shoot-out – Alexandersson took and scored with his side's fourth attempt; the match was eventually decided after 24 kicks – and enjoyed a more comfortable victory over Assyriska FF in 2003. The cup wins meant that Elfsborg qualified for the UEFA Cup, and Alexandersson made his debut in European competition in the 2001–02 UEFA Cup qualifying round second leg at home to Estonian club Narva Trans, a 5–0 win. He made no further appearances in that edition of the competition.

In the 2004–05 UEFA Cup second qualifying round, goalless with three minutes left to play of the away leg against Glentoran, Alexandersson "volleyed in a free-kick from the right swung over by left-winger Andreas Klarström." He also scored the winner in the home leg. He started in the first leg of the 2004–05 UEFA Cup first round match, in which Elfsborg lost 2–0 away to Dinamo Zagreb; the second leg ended goalless.

== Football in Norway ==
In January 2006, Alexandersson signed a three-year contract with Aalesund, newly relegated to the Norwegian First Division. He played in ten matches as Aalesund were promoted as runners-up and a further five in the 2007 Tippeligaen before finishing that season back in the First Division with six appearances on loan to Skeid. Ahead of the 2008 season, Alexandersson wanted regular football and Aalesund needed to free up space in the squad. Talk of a return to the First Division with Kongsvinger or Sandnes Ulf came to nothing, and in February 2008, he was released by mutual consent and returned to Swedish football.

== Later life and career ==
After three appearances in the 2008 Superettan (second tier) for Mjällby AIF, Alexandersson moved into the Västergötlands Fotbollförbund district leagues where he began to coach as well as play. After two seasons as player and assistant coach with Dalstorps IF, he spent the 2011 campaign as player-coach with Grimsås IF, and then returned to the Borås area where he took a job at a school in Sandared. He joined Bollebygds IF as player-coach, and said ahead of the 2012 season that his priority would be coaching rather than playing. He played 16 league matches over a two-year spell, and his team were twice relegated.

Alexandersson was appointed as head of youth at IF Elfsborg in November 2018, and spent two years in the role.
