= Sowmiya Narayanasamy =

Indian footballer

Personal information
- Date of birth: 25 July 2000 (age 26)
- Place of birth: Salem, Tamil Nadu, India
- Height: 1.71 m (5 ft 7 in)
- Position: Goalkeeper

Team information
- Current team: Gokulam Kerala
- Number: 31

Senior career*
Years	Team	Apps	(Gls)
2019–2022	Sethu	16	(0)
2022–2023	Gokulam Kerala	8	(0)
2025–	Gokulam Kerala	4	(0)

International career^{‡}
2018	India U19		
2019–	India	3	(0)
- * Club domestic league appearances and goals as of 18 May 2026 ‡ National team caps and goals as of 1 November 2023

Sowmiya Narayanasamy (born 25 July 2000) is an Indian professional footballer who plays for the Indian Women's League club Gokulam Kerala and the India women's national football team.

== Career ==
Sowmiya won first trophy of her club career with Sethu FC in 2019 Indian Women's League season. She was part of the Indian team that played the AFC Women's Asia Cup 2022.

== Career statistics ==
=== International ===
As of 1 November 2023

National team	Year	Caps	Goals
India	2019	1	0
India	2021	0	0
India	2022	1	0
India	2023	1	0
India	2024	0	0
India	2025	0	0
India	2026	0	0
Total		3	0

== Honours ==
India

- SAFF Women's Championship: 2019

Sethu FC

- Indian Women's League: 2018–19

Gokulam Kerala

- Indian Women's League: 2022–23

Tamil Nadu

- Rajmata Jijabai Trophy: 2022–23
- National Games Bronze medal: 2022
