= Roja Devi Asem =

Indian footballer (born 2000)

Roja Devi
Personal information
- Full name: Asem Roja Devi
- Date of birth: 15 April 2000 (age 26)
- Place of birth: Manipur, India
- Position: Defender

Team information
- Current team: Gokulam Kerala
- Number: 6

Senior career*
Years	Team	Apps	(Gls)
2016–2017	Pune City	5	(1)
2017–2018	Eastern Sporting Union	7	(2)
2020–2021	KRYPHSA	7	(2)
2022–2023	Kickstart	11	(6)
2023–	Gokulam Kerala	47	(7)

International career^{‡}
2018	India U17	4	(2)
2018	India U19	4	(1)
2019	India	16	(0)
- * Club domestic league appearances and goals as of 15 May 2026 ‡ National team caps and goals as of 9 March 2020

Roja Devi Asem (Meitei: Asem Roja Devi, born 15 April 2000) is an Indian professional footballer who plays as a defender for the Indian Women's League club Gokulam Kerala and the India women's national team.

== Career ==
As the Indian Women's League launched in 2016, she played for FC Pune City for the first season of the league. She played five matches and scored a goal. In the next season, for 2017–18, she played for Eastern Sporting Union and scored 2 goals. For the 2019–20 season she played for the Kryphsa F.C. and scored 2 goals in 7 matches.

== Honours ==
India

- SAFF Women's Championship: 2019
- South Asian Games Gold medal: 2019

KRYPHSA

- Indian Women's League runner-up: 2019–20

Gokulam Kerala

- Indian Women's League: 2022–23

Manipur

- Rajmata Jijabai Trophy: 2021–22, 2023–24
- National Games Gold medal: 2022
