= Neha Sillay =

Indian footballer (born 2006)

Personal information
- Date of birth: 19 May 2006 (age 20)
- Place of birth: Mangali, Hisar, Haryana, India
- Height: 1.57 m (5 ft 2 in)
- Position: Forward

Team information
- Current team: Nita
- Number: 7

Senior career*
Years	Team	Apps	(Gls)
2022–2023	Mohammedan Sporting		
2023–2024	HOPS		
2024–2025	Odisha		
2025–	Nita		

International career^{‡}
- India U17
2022–	India U20	22	(8)
2024–	India	1	(2)
- * Club domestic league appearances and goals ‡ National team caps and goals as of 25 October 2025

Neha Sillay (born 19 May 2006) is an Indian professional footballer from Haryana, who plays as a forward for the Indian Women's League club Nita and the India women's national football team.

== Early life ==
Sillay is from Mangali village, Hissar, Haryana.

== Career ==
Sillay was part of the Indian squad which played at the 2022 FIFA U-17 Women's World Cup at Bhubaneswar in 2022.

Earlier in October 2022, she played the Under-17 friendly matches in Spain against WSS Barcelona. In 2023, she was called for the Senior camp to prepare for AFC Olympic Qualifiers Round 2. She made her Senior India debut in the friendlies against the Maldives at Bengaluru on 2 January 2025.

In October 2024, she played for Odisha FC against Ho Chi Minh city the AFC Women's Champions League 2024–2025, at the Thong Nhat Stadium in Vietnam.

== Honours ==
Haryana

- Rajmata Jijabai Trophy runner-up: 2022–23

== Career statistics ==
=== International ===
As of 30 December 2024

National team	Year	Caps	Goals
India	2024	1	2
Total		1	2

Scores and results list India's goal tally first.

List of international goals scored by Neha Sillay
No.	Date	Venue	Opponent	Score	Result	Competition
1.	30 December 2024	Padukone – Dravid Centre for Sports Excellence, Bengaluru, India	Maldives	5–0	14–0	Friendly
2.	30 December 2024	Padukone – Dravid Centre for Sports Excellence, Bengaluru, India	Maldives	8–0	14–0	Friendly
