= National Center of Excellence =

Football complex in Kolkata, India

- National Center of Excellence - India Football Campus
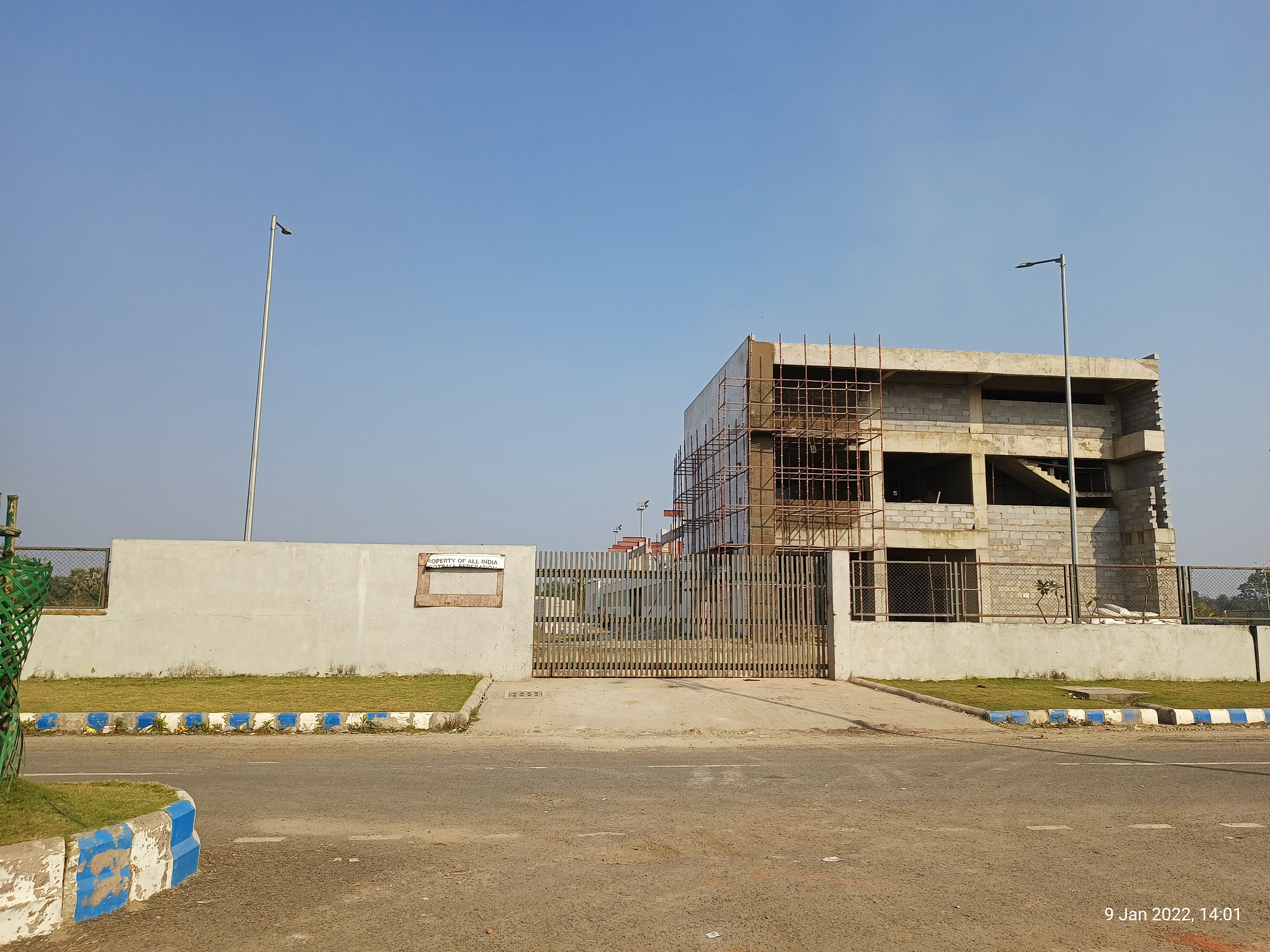

- Location within West Bengal
- Address: Street Number 787, Action Area II, New Town, Kolkata 700157; India
- Coordinates: 22.6089°N 88.4599°E
- Owner: All India Football Federation
- Public transit: Eco Park

Construction
- Built: 2018 (8 years ago)
- Cost: ₹200 crore (equivalent to ₹268 crore or US$28 million in 2023)
- Architect: Collage Design Pvt. Ltd.
- General contractors: Shanghvi and Associates Consultants Pvt. Ltd, MEPCON Design Studio

Website
- the-aiff.com/national-center-excellence

The National Center of Excellence (or National Center of Excellence - India Football Campus) by All India Football Federation is an under construction football complex, in Kolkata, West Bengal, India. It serves as one of the home bases for India national football team and India women's national football team. It includes India’s first ever roof top pitch. Built on a 15 acres (650,000 ft^{2}) land behind Eco Park and beside a proposed deer park, in Action Area II, Rajarhat, New Town.

== Location ==
The National Center of Excellence is located on Plot No. AA-IIE/57/A, Street Number 787, Action Area-II (E) of New Town. It is surrounded by Eco Park golf arena on two sides and proposed deer park on another side. Eco Park metro station of Kolkata Metro Orange Line will serve National Center of Excellence.

== History ==
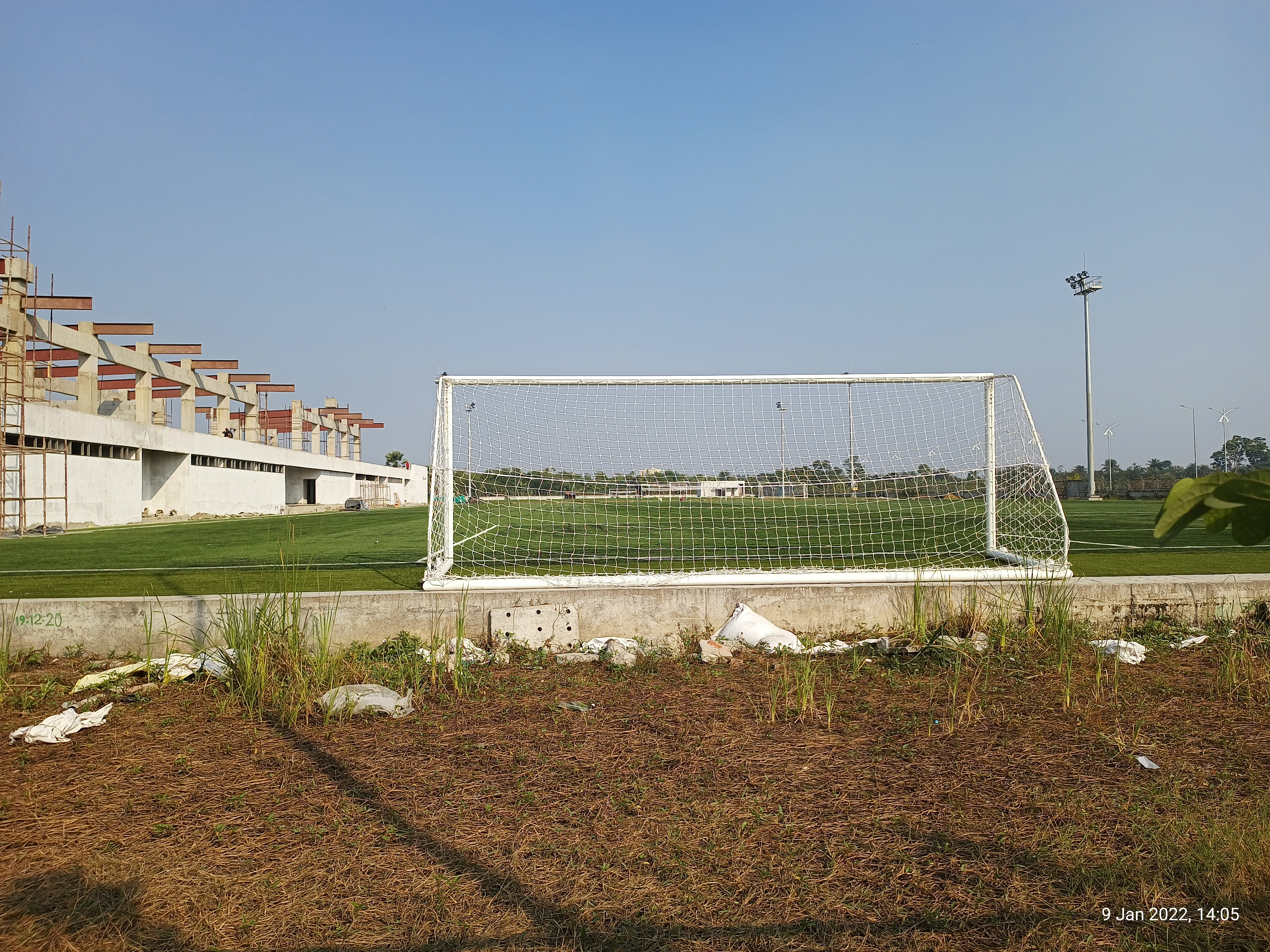
One of the turf of the National Center of Excellence

Back in 2014, after the Kolkata-based club Atlético de Kolkata (ATK) won the first season of Indian Super League (ISL), Chief Minister Mamata Banerjee proposed and offered the club owners, plot in Rajarhat NewTown area, to build an international standard football stadium. She said, "We have the Salt Lake Stadium for football and the Eden Gardens for cricket. So, I would urge Atletico to develop an international stadium in Rajarhat where we are ready to provide you land" and "You have made entire Bengal proud by winning the ISL. I take this opportunity to urge you for developing the new stadium. Come to us with all the relevant documents and we will ensure the procedures are formalised as early as possible," During that time, the preparations for 2017 FIFA U-17 World Cup had also started. Government of West Bengal handed over Rabindra Sarobar Stadium to host U-17 World Cup matches and asked them to develop it into a world-class football stadium. In 2017, the quarter shareholder of ATK, Atlético Madrid exited and the plan of building an international standard football stadium never materialised. And the U-17 World Cup venue silently shifted from Rabindra Sarobar Stadium to Salt Lake Stadium. Later that year, during the U-17 World Cup, All India Football Federation President Praful Patel, with the presence of FIFA President Gianni Infantino and Mamata Banerjee announced National Centre of Excellence in Rajarhat, New Town. It was a part of U-17 World Cup legacy. Mamata Banerjee said that the Government of West Bengal would provide 15 acres (650,000 ft^{2}) land on lease at ₹1 (1.0¢ US) for 90 years. A two-year deadline from inception of work was given. The works started in late 2018–early 2019 with an estimate of ₹100 crore (equivalent to ₹134 crore or US$14 million in 2023), which doubled later. From beginning, the project has faced hurdles which led to delays. When work started, the region was hit by severe monsoon. Then in 2020, the Super Cyclone Amphan; COVID-19 pandemic and lockdown hampered the work.

== Details ==
The Center of Excellence is being set up by the All India Football Federation with the technical and financial help from FIFA and Asian Football Confederation. It will cater the India national football team and India women's national football team, and will be their home base. It will have technical centre for the national teams, coach and referee education, youth and grassroots development, hotel for the national teams, futsal development, medical centre, an artificial pitch, a natural pitch, a stadium, dressing rooms and centre for sports management, sports science and sports law. The centre will also feature India’s first ever roof top pitch. It is being built in multiple phases. The first phase includes the technical centre, artificial and natural fields. It is being designed by a Mumbai-based firm Collage Design Pvt. Ltd., at a cost of ₹200 crore (equivalent to ₹268 crore or US$28 million in 2023). The total site area is 15 acres (650,000 ft^{2}), where the development area is 5.75 acres (250,000 ft^{2}). The centre will also feature India’s first ever roof top pitch.

== See also ==
- Football in Kolkata
