= Shubhangi Singh =

Indian footballer (born 2006)

Personal information
- Date of birth: 11 June 2006 (age 20)
- Place of birth: Uttar Pradesh, India
- Height: 1.60 m (5 ft 3 in)
- Position: Defender

Team information
- Current team: Gokulam Kerala
- Number: 16

Senior career*
Years	Team	Apps	(Gls)
2023–	Gokulam Kerala	30	(3)

International career
2023	India U17	3	(0)
2025–	India U20	23	(2)
2026–	India	2	(0)
- * Club domestic league appearances and goals as of 11 October 2026

Shubhangi Singh (born 11 June 2006) is an Indian women's international footballer who plays as a defender for the Indian Women's League club Gokulam Kerala and the India national team.

== Career ==
=== Gokulam Kerala ===
In 2023, Shubhangi joined Indian Women's League club Gokulam Kerala.

== International career ==
=== Youth ===
In the FIFA U-17 World Cup, she was part of the Indian team that played three matches in October 2022 and she captained India in the 2026 AFC U-20 Women's Asian Cup held in Thailand in April 2026.

== Career statistics ==
=== International ===
As of 11 October 2026

National team	Year	Caps	Goals
India	2026	2	0
Total		2	0
