= India women's national under-20 football team =

Women's under-20 national association football team representing India

India Women's U-20
- Nickname: Young Tigresses
- Association: All India Football Federation
- Confederation: Asian Football Confederation (Asia)
- Sub-confederation: SAFF (South Asia)
- Head coach: Joakim Alexandersson
- Captain: Shubhangi Singh
- FIFA code: IND
First colours	Second colours

First international
- India 0–4 South Korea (Goa, India; 19 April 2002)

Biggest win
- India 18–0 Pakistan (Chonburi, Thailand; 24 October 2018)

Biggest defeat
- Australia 18–0 India (Kuala Lumpur, Malaysia; 12 November 2008)

Asian Cup
- Appearances: 4 (first in 2002)
- Best result: Quarter final (2004)

SAFF Championship
- Appearances: 5 (first in 2018)
- Best result: Champions (2022, 2024)
Medal record
SAFF Championship
Gold medal – first place	2022 India
Gold medal – first place	2024 Bangladesh
Silver medal – second place	2021 Bangladesh
Bronze medal – third place	2018 Bhutan

The India women's national under-20 football team represents India in international women's under-20 football in the AFC U-20 Women's Asian Cup and the FIFA U-20 Women's World Cup. It is controlled by the AIFF.

== History ==
=== FIFA U-20 Women's World Cup ===
FIFA organised U20 women's world cup in 2002 for the first time, and for qualification from Asian teams, only the finalist from AFC U-20 Women's Asian Cup is allowed to enter into the tournament, which was also the same criteria for the next edition and since 2006 the top three teams from AFC U19 championships would be allowed to enter into U20 world cup. India failed to qualify for the FIFA U-20 Women's World Cup as they failed to be finalist in any AFC U19 Championships till 2017 edition.

=== AFC U-19 Women's Championship ===
The AFC U-19 Women's Championship serves as a qualifying competition for the FIFA U-20 Women's World Cup. For first three edition from 2002, it had been organised on every even years, and in all those three championships India participated. After 2006 Championship, it had been organised on every odd years since 2007 and coincidentally India failed to qualify for the Championships since then.

India hosted the inaugural AFC U-19 Women's Championship in 2002. India U-19 failed to advance beyond group stage, finishing third in group. Indian girls lost to eventual champions Japan by 9−0 and South Korea by 4−0, only had a win against Guam by 6−0 but did not help much to move forward.

In next edition of championship held in China, India done well to reach quarter finals, winning against Hong Kong by 2−1, Singapore by 1−0 and a loss against Chinese Tapei by 0−3, and reaching the quarter final, their FIFA U20 Worldcup dream was shattered as was knocked out by North Korea by 0−10.

For 2006 edition the qualification round started for AFC U19 Women's Championship, where India easily qualified, defeating Kyrgyzstan by 7−0 and Bangladesh by 9−0 which was their biggest win that time. 2006 AFC U-19 Women's Championship saw India finishing bottom of group, consisting of Asian heavyweights South Korea, North Korea and Japan, defeated by all these three team by huge goal difference of 11−0, 14−0 and 6−0 respectively. That's the last time India made it into the group stage of the AFC U-19 Women's Championship.

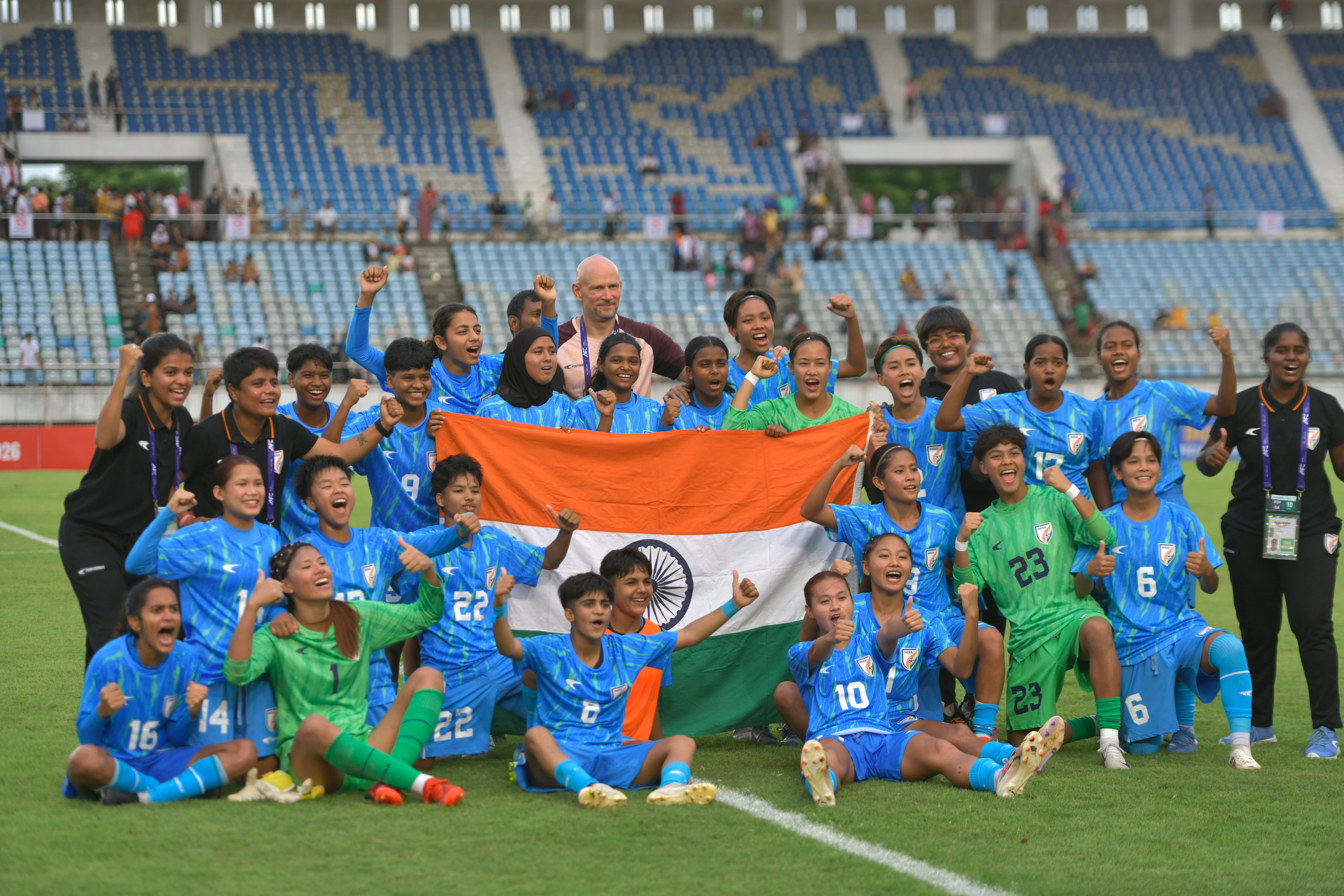
India celebrating after qualifying for the 2026 AFC U20 Asian Cup.

At the 2007 qualification India lost two games in the group stage against Myanmar by 1−2 and Thailand by 1−5 which cost the AFC Championships for the first time in 2007 edition. Similar fate was in 2009 qualification tournament which was worse than before as India lost all the group matches and the worst performance came against Australia, where the Australian girls defeated the Indian by a huge 18−0, thus their biggest defeat till now. Next four edition, the girls seen similar scenario with zero luck to enter in the championships. For 2019 AFC U-19 Women's Championship India faced Pakistan, Nepal and Thailand in round 1 at the 2019 Championship qualification where they won two match defeating Pakistan by 18−0 which is their biggest win till now and host Thailand by 1−0 and a defeat by Nepal with 0−2, but India failed to move to round 2 courtesy of their head-to-head result against Nepal. While Thailand, Nepal and India finished on three points, the goal difference between just these three teams were counted, which left Thailand at the top with a +2 goal difference, while India and Nepal were tied at -1, due to this, the head-to-head result between India and Nepal came into play again, and Nepal go through and India left behind. But, India won their group stage in the 2026 AFC U-20 Asian cup qualification. Beating Turkmenistan 0–5, beating Myanmar 0–1, and tying to Indonesia 0–0.India was placed in Group C with Australia, Japan, and Chinese Taipei. In their opening game they lost to Japan 0–6. Then losing their game to Australia 0–5. However, India managed to beat Chinese Taipei 1–3. It was India’s first win in the tournament since 2004. However, India was the third placed worst ranked team and failed to qualify for the quarter-finals.

=== SAFF U-18 Women's Championship ===
2018 SAFF U-18 Women's Championship, at Bhutan, is the inaugural edition of the SAFF U18 championships being organised by SAFF on every even years to align with the AFC U19 Championships and FIFA U20 Worldcup. It's a preparatory tournament for the South Asian teams for AFC U19 championship qualification round. India thrashed host Bhutan and Maldives by 4−0 and 8−0 respectively in the group matches, reaching to the semi-finals they lost to Nepal through penalty shoot-out by 1−3 as the full-time ended in a 1−1 tie, thus their dream of first SAFF u18 champion ended here but they won the third place in the tournament by defeating Bhutan again by a solitary goal.

=== SAFF U-19 Women's Championship ===
The 2024 SAFF U-19 Women's Championship is the fifth edition of the SAFF U-18/19/20 Women's Championship, an international football competition for women's under–19 national teams organized by SAFF. On 07 February 2024, India beat Nepal 4–0 to enter SAFF U-19 Women's Championships final and shared the title in the final with Bangladesh.

== Recent results and fixtures ==
The following is a list of match results in the last 12 months, as well as any future matches that have been scheduled.

Legend

Win Draw Loss Fixture

=== 2025 ===
29 November Friendly	India	1–0	Uzbekistan	Mamallapuram, India
17:00 UTC+5:30				Stadium: Scamper Park (FC Madras Academy)

2 December Friendly	India	4–2	Uzbekistan	Mamallapuram, India
17:00 UTC+5:30		Report		Stadium: Scamper Park (FC Madras Academy)

=== 2026 ===
19 February Unofficial friendly	Hammarby women (Sweden)	6–0	India	Stockholm, Sweden
18:30 IST	? 16', 22', 53', 59', 77', 85'	Report		Stadium: Hammarby IP

22 February Unofficial friendly	Täby women (Sweden)	0–4	India	Lidingö, Sweden
–:– IST		Report	B. Kumari 10', 63'; Kipgen 23'; Sillay 80'	Stadium: Bosön

25 February Unofficial friendly	Enskede women (Sweden)	1–1	India	Lidingö, Sweden
–:– IST	?? 88'	Report	Nongmeikapam 44'	Stadium: Bosön

28 February Unofficial friendly	Karlbergs women (Sweden)	2–1	India	Lidingö, Sweden
–:– IST	?? 58'; ?? 72'	Report	Sillay 56'	Stadium: Bosön

5 March Unofficial friendly	Älvsjö women (Sweden)	2–5	India	Lidingö, Sweden
–:– IST	??; ??	Report	Kipgen 1', 20' (pen.), 59'; Colney 34'; Raul 90'	Stadium: Bosön

2 April AFC U-20 Asian Cup	Japan	6–0	India	Pathum Thani, Thailand
20:00 UTC+7	Chanu 12' (o.g.); Kimura 54'; Fukushima 57'; Tago 75'; Matsunaga 81'; Y. Honda 87'	Report		Stadium: Thammasat Stadium; Attendance: 47; Referee: Khin Nyein Chan (Myanmar)

5 April AFC U-20 Asian Cup	India	0–5	Australia	Pathum Thani, Thailand
16:00 UTC+7		Report	Halmarick 38' (pen.), 39', 48'; Butrus 54'; Brown 90+4'	Stadium: Pathum Thani Stadium; Referee: Esra'a Al-Mbaidin (Jordan)

8 April AFC U-20 Asian Cup	Chinese Taipei	1–3	India	Pathum Thani, Thailand
16:00 UTC+7	Kao Hsin 90+3'	Report	Khumukcham 26'; Nongmeikapam 32', 87' (pen.)	Stadium: Pathum Thani Stadium; Attendance: 30; Referee: Bùi Thị Thu Trang (Vietnam)

== Coaching staff ==
As of July 2025, following are the current coaching staffs:

Position	Name
Head coach	(Sweden) Joakim Alexandersson
Assistant coach	(India) Paromita Sit
Goalkeeper coach	(India) KK Hameed
Strength and conditioning coach	
Performance analyst	(India) Shrivatsa Joglekar

== Players ==
=== Current squad ===
The following 23 players were called up for the 2026 AFC U-20 Women's Asian Cup to be held in Thailand in April 2026.

Caps and goals are correct as of 8 April 2026, after the match against Chinese Taipei.

No.	Pos.	Player	Date of birth (age)	Caps	Goals	Club
1	GK	Monalisha Devi Moirangthem	3 July 2006 (age 20)	12	0	(All India Football Federation) Sribhumi
23	GK	Nandini Mattu	6 June 2007 (age 19)	0	0	(All India Football Federation) Sethu
13	GK	Ribansi Jamu	18 December 2008 (age 17)	2	0	(All India Football Federation) Garhwal United
22	DF	Cindy Colney	26 March 2007 (age 19)	14	1	(All India Football Federation) Nita
5	DF	Nishima Kumari	13 July 2007 (age 19)	6	0	(All India Football Federation) Sribhumi
14	DF	Remi Thokchom	14 March 2008 (age 18)	10	0	(All India Football Federation) Gokulam Kerala
15	DF	Ruchi Yadav	1 January 2006 (age 20)	0	0	(All India Football Federation) Sethu
2	DF	Sahena TH	14 March 2006 (age 20)	7	0	(All India Football Federation) Gokulam Kerala
16	DF	Shubhangi Singh (captain)	11 June 2006 (age 20)	23	2	(All India Football Federation) Gokulam Kerala
4	DF	Thoibisana Chanu Toijam	7 March 2007 (age 19)	15	1	(All India Football Federation) Sribhumi
19	MF	Anju Chanu Kayenpaibam	2 March 2007 (age 19)	12	1	(All India Football Federation) Sethu
6	MF	Arina Devi Nameirakpam	4 March 2008 (age 18)	10	1	(All India Football Federation) Sribhumi
12	MF	Bhumika Devi Khumukcham	15 February 2007 (age 19)	9	1	(All India Football Federation) Nita
18	MF	Monisha Singha	13 January 2007 (age 19)	4	0	(All India Football Federation) Garhwal United
7	MF	Neha Sillay	19 May 2006 (age 20)	22	8	(All India Football Federation) Nita
8	MF	Pooja	7 February 2007 (age 19)	17	8	(All India Football Federation) HOPS
3	MF	Shruti Kumari	25 February 2006 (age 20)	3	0	(All India Football Federation) Garhwal United
9	FW	Babita Kumari	2 August 2008 (age 18)	7	0	(All India Football Federation) Nita
20	FW	Deepika Pal	22 January 2008 (age 18)	6	0	(All India Football Federation) Garhwal United
11	FW	Lhingdeikim Kipgen	23 January 2008 (age 18)	10	1	(All India Football Federation) Garhwal United
17	FW	Shilji Shaji	13 March 2007 (age 19)	3	0	(All India Football Federation) Gokulam Kerala
10	FW	Sibani Devi Nongmeikapam	13 January 2007 (age 19)	17	10	(All India Football Federation) Sribhumi
21	FW	Sulanjana Raul	4 June 2007 (age 19)	12	6	(All India Football Federation) East Bengal

=== Recent call-ups ===
Pos.	Player	Date of birth (age)	Caps	Goals	Club	Latest call-up
GK	Melody Chanu Keisham	2 March 2006 (age 20)	5	0	(India) Gokulam Kerala	Uzbekistan, December 2025
DF	Alka Indwar	10 May 2008 (age 18)	0	0	(India) Garhwal United	2026 AFC U-20 Asian Cup^{PRE}
DF	Alina Chingakham	7 June 2008 (age 18)	4	0	(India) Gokulam Kerala	Uzbekistan, December 2025
DF	Juhi Singh	29 July 2007 (age 19)	3	0	(India) Garhwal United	Uzbekistan, December 2025
DF	Viksit Bara	8 April 2008 (age 18)	5	0	(India) Indian Arrows	Uzbekistan, December 2025
DF	Sanjita Devi Thingbaijam	10 September 2006 (age 20)	1	0	(India) Garhwal United	Pink Ladies U20 Youth Cup
MF	Misha Bhandari	30 June 2006 (age 20)	0	0	(England) Loughborough University	March 2026^{PRE}
MF	Khushbu Saroj	16 May 2007 (age 19)	3	0	(India) Kemp	Uzbekistan, December 2025
^{INJ} Withdrew due to injury^{PRE} Preliminary squad / standby

== Competitive record ==
=== FIFA U-20 Women's World Cup ===
India has never qualified for the under-20 women's world cup, but had come close to qualify in 2004 where they needed to qualify for finals but ended up getting knocked out in quarterfinals.

FIFA U-20 Women's World Cup record
Host/Year	Result	Pld	W	D*	L	GF	GA	GD
(Canada) 2002 to (Poland) 2026	Did not qualify							
Total: 0/12	–	–	–	–	–	–	–	–

=== AFC U-20 Women's Asian Cup ===
India was the first nation to host AFC U-20 women's championship. In that edition, they failed to progress to the knockouts stage as they finished below South Korea and Japan. However, in the next edition India qualified for the quarterfinals, but were thrashed 10–0 by North Korea. In the next edition, which was also the last time they played this tournament, India suffered massive defeats as they finished bottom of their group of four teams with -31 as goal difference.

AFC U-20 Women's Asian Cup record									Qualification record						
Host/Year	Result	Pld	W	D*	L	GF	GA	GD	Pld	W	D*	L	GF	GA	GD
(India) 2002	Group stage	3	1	0	2	6	13	−7	No Qualification						
(China) 2004	Quarterfinal	4	2	0	2	3	14	−11	No Qualification						
(Malaysia) 2006	Group stage	3	0	0	3	0	31	−31	2	2	0	0	16	0	+16
(China) 2007	Did not qualify								4	2	0	2	13	7	+6
(China) 2009	Did not qualify								4	0	0	4	1	38	−37
(Vietnam) 2011	Did not qualify								3	2	0	1	10	4	+6
(China) 2013	Did not qualify								5	2	0	3	2	25	−23
(China) 2015	Did not qualify								3	1	0	2	4	6	−2
(China) 2017	Did not qualify								2	0	1	1	1	5	−4
(Thailand) 2019	Did not qualify								3	2	0	1	19	2	+17
(Uzbekistan) 2022	Cancelled								Cancelled						
(Uzbekistan) 2024	Did not qualify								3	2	1	0	14	1	+13
(Thailand) 2026	Group stage	3	1	0	2	3	12	−9	3	2	1	0	8	0	+8
(China) 2028	To be decided								To be decided						
Total: 4/12	Quarterfinal	13	4	0	9	12	70	−58	32	15	3	14	88	88	0

AFC U-20 Women's Asian Cup History
Year	Round	Score	Result
2002	Group stage	India 0–4 South Korea	Loss
2002	Group stage	India 6−0 Guam	Won
2002	Group stage	India 0–9 Japan	Loss
2004	Group stage	India 2–1 Hong Kong	Won
2004	Group stage	India 1–0 Singapore	Won
2004	Group stage	India 0–3 Chinese Taipei	Loss
2004	Quarter-final	India 0–10 North Korea	Loss
2006	Group stage	India 0–11 South Korea	Loss
2006	Group stage	India 0−14 North Korea	Loss
2006	Group stage	India 0–6 Japan	Loss
2026	Group stage	India 0–6 Japan	Loss
2026	Group stage	India 0−5 Australia	Loss
2026	Group stage	India 3–1 Chinese Taipei	Won

=== SAFF U-18/U-19/U-20 Women's Championship ===
SAFF U-18/U-19/U-20 Women's Championship record
Host/Year	Result	Pld	W	D*	L	GF	GA	GD
(Bhutan) 2018	Semi-final	4	3	0	1	14	1	+13
(Bangladesh) 2021	Runners-up	5	3	0	2	9	2	+7
(India) 2022	Winners	4	3	0	1	13	2	+11
(Bangladesh) 2023	Group stage	3	1	1	1	13	3	+10
(Bangladesh) 2024	Winners	4	2	1	1	15	2	+13
(Bangladesh) 2025	Did not participate							
(Nepal) 2026	Participated by India U17 team (Note: Though the tournament is for U-20 age group, India fielded their U-17 team as a preparatory tournament for the 2026 AFC U-17 Women's Asian Cup.)							
Total: 5/7	Winners	20	12	2	6	64	10	+54

- DNP : Did not participate
- DNQ : Did not qualify

=== Other tournaments ===
==== Pink Ladies U20 Youth Cup ====
- Pink Ladies U20 Youth Cup – 2nd out of 4 teams (Pink Ladies Cup).

== Overall competitive records ==
As of 8 April 2026 vs Chinese Taipei (excluding friendlies & minor tournaments)

Competition	Pld	W	D	L	GF	GA	GD	Win%
FIFA U-20 Women's World Cup	0	0	0	0	0	0	+0	—
AFC U-20 Women's Asian Cup	13	4	0	9	12	70	−58	30.77
AFC U-20 Women's Asian Cup Qualification	32	15	3	14	88	88	+0	46.88
SAFF U-20 Women's Championship	20	12	3	5	64	10	+54	60.00
Total	65	31	6	28	164	168	−4	47.69

== Head-to-head record ==
As of 8 April 2026 vs Chinese Taipei (excluding friendlies & minor tournaments)

The following table shows India's head-to-head record in the official tournaments of AFC U-20 Women's Asian Cup (including qualifiers) and SAFF U-20 Women's Championship.

Positive Record Neutral Record Negative Record

Opponent	Pld	W	D	L	GF	GA	GD	Win %
Australia	2	0	0	2	0	23	−23	0.00
Bangladesh	10	4	2	4	18	5	+13	40.00
Bhutan	5	5	0	0	30	0	+30	100.00
Chinese Taipei	4	1	0	3	3	18	−15	25.00
Guam	1	1	0	0	6	0	+6	100.00
Hong Kong	1	1	0	0	2	1	+1	100.00
Indonesia	2	1	1	0	6	0	+6	50.00
Iran	3	0	1	2	4	9	−5	0.00
Japan	3	0	0	3	0	21	−21	0.00
Jordan	3	2	0	1	7	3	+4	66.67
Kyrgyzstan	1	1	0	0	7	0	+7	100.00
Lebanon	1	1	0	0	3	1	+2	100.00
Maldives	1	1	0	0	8	0	+8	100.00
Myanmar	3	1	0	2	2	10	−8	33.33
North Korea	2	0	0	2	0	24	−24	0.00
Nepal	7	4	1	2	19	7	+12	57.14
Pakistan	1	1	0	0	18	0	+18	100.00
Singapore	3	3	0	0	15	0	+15	100.00
South Korea	2	0	0	2	0	15	−15	0.00
Sri Lanka	1	1	0	0	5	0	+5	100.00
Thailand	3	1	0	2	2	14	−12	33.33
Turkmenistan	1	1	0	0	7	0	+7	100.00
Uzbekistan	2	1	1	0	5	2	+3	50.00
Vietnam	3	0	1	2	1	15	−14	0.00
Total	65	31	6	28	164	168	−4	47.69

== See also ==
- India women's national football team
- India women's national under-17 football team
- India national football team
- Indian Women's League
- Women's football in India
- Sport in India
- Football in India
