= Emueje Ogbiagbevha =

Nigerian association footballer (born 1990)

Personal information
- Full name: Emueje Ogbiagbevha
- Date of birth: 10 February 1990 (age 36)
- Place of birth: Nigeria,
- Height: 1.75 m (5 ft 9 in)
- Position: Striker

Team information
- Current team: FC Minsk
- Number: 9

Senior career*
Years	Team	Apps	(Gls)
- Pelican Stars
2009–2010	Rossiyanka	31	(29)
2011–2012	Energiya Voronezh	13	(15)
2012	BIIK Kazygurt		
2016–2020	FC Minsk	52	(79)
2025–2026	Dinamo Minsk		
2026	Gokulam Kerala	6	(4)

International career
- Nigeria
- * Club domestic league appearances and goals

Emueje Ogbiagbevha is a Nigerian footballer who plays as a striker. She previously played for BIIK Kazygurt in the Kazakhstani Championship, and in the Russian Championship for Rossiyanka and Energiya Voronezh. She was the top scorer of the 2010 season. While playing in Rossiyanka she won two doubles. She has also played the Champions League with Energiya Voronezh and Kazygurt She is also a member of the Nigerian national team. In 2016, Ogbiagbevha joined FC Minsk.

In the 2019-20 season she became the first African woman to win the (shared) UEFA Women's Champions League top scorer award. After the season her contract expired at Minsk.

== Early career ==
She previously played for Pelican Stars F.C., Nasarawa Amazons and Delta Queens F.C. in Nigeria Women Premier League.
