= Priyadharshini Selladurai =

Indian football player

Personal information
- Full name: Priyadharshini Selladurai
- Date of birth: 26 February 2003 (age 23)
- Place of birth: Tamil Nadu, India
- Position: Midfielder

Team information
- Current team: Gokulam Kerala
- Number: 30

Senior career*
Years	Team	Apps	(Gls)
- FC Thamizhatchi
2022–2023	Sethu		
2023–2024	Gokulam Kerala		
2024–2025	Kemp		
2025	Liberty Ladies FC		
2025–	Gokulam Kerala	10	(0)

International career^{‡}
2025–	India	9	(3)
- * Club domestic league appearances and goals as of 15 May 2026 ‡ National team caps and goals as of 11 October 2026

Priyadharshini Selladurai (born 26 February 2003) is an Indian professional footballer from Tamil Nadu who plays as a midfielder for the Indian Women's League club Gokulam Kerala and the India national football team.

== Early life and career ==
Priyadharshini is from Tamil Nadu. She is selected by Indian chief coach Crispin Chettri for the National camp at Anantapur, Andhra Pradesh, in preparation for the Pink Ladies Cup, to be held at Sharjah, United Arab Emirates, from 20 to 26 February 2025. Before joining Kemp, she played for Gokulam Kerala FC, Sethu Madurai, FC Thamizhatchi, Tamil Nadu State Team, TNFA Junior Women's Team 2018. She played a crucial role in Tamil Nadu winning the Rajmata Jijabai Trophy for the second time. She scored a goal and assisting in another, in the 2–1 victory in the final against Haryana at the Gurunanak Stadium in Amritsar on 28 June 2023.

She plays for Kemp FC in the 2024–2025 KSFA women's league. In the match against Maatru Pratishtana FC on 4 August 2024, she scored a hat-trick.

=== Senior India debut ===
She made her Senior India debut in the first of the two FIFA Women's International Friendlies against Uzbekistan played on 30 May 2025 at the Padukone-Dravid Centre for Sports Excellence stadium, Bengaluru.

== Career statistics ==
=== International ===
As of 11 October 2026

National team	Year	Caps	Goals
India	2025	5	2
India	2026	4	1
Total		9	3

Scores and results list India's goal tally first.

List of international goals scored by Priyadharshini Selladurai
No.	Date	Venue	Opponent	Score	Result	Competition
1.	23 June 2025	700th Anniversary Stadium, Chiang Mai, Thailand	Mongolia	11–0	13–0	2026 AFC Women's Asian Cup qualification
2.	23 June 2025	700th Anniversary Stadium, Chiang Mai, Thailand	Mongolia	13–0	13–0	2026 AFC Women's Asian Cup qualification
3.	15 April 2026	Nyayo National Stadium, Nairobi, Kenya	Malawi	3–2	3–2	2026 FIFA Series
