= Indian women's national futsal team results =

India women's national futsal team

This article summarizes the outcomes of all officially recognised matches played by the India women's national futsal team in the 2020s. Update on 23 January (vs Sri Lanka).

Summary Matches 1–9
Games	Won	Draw	Lost	GF	GA	Win %
9	4	0	5	34	27	44.44%
Biggest win
Maldives 1–11 India 13 January 2026
Biggest defeat
India 0–6 Indonesia 17 January 2025
Honours
(silver) 2026 SAFF Championship, Thailand

Key
Indicates Indian team won the match
Indicates the match ended in draw
Indicates Indian team lost the match

== 2020s ==
=== 2025 ===
15 January 2025 2025 AFC Asian Cup qualifiers	Hong Kong	5–0	India	Yogyakarta, Indonesia
11:30 UTC+5:30	Cheung Wai Ki 13', 23', 40'; Wai Yuen Ting 27'; Kung Yuet Charis 35'	AFC; AIFF		Stadium: Among Rogo Sports Hall; Referee: Nour Chaito (Lebanon)

17 January 2025 2025 AFC Asian Cup qualifiers	India	0–6	Indonesia	Yogyakarta, Indonesia
14:30 UTC+5:30		AFC; AIFF	Ikeu Rosita 7'; Insyafadya 13'; Fitri 14'; Novita Murni 20'; Diah Tri 22'; Nisma Francida Rusdiana 32'	Stadium: Among Rogo Sports Hall; Referee: Reem Al-Bishi (Saudi Arabia)

19 January 2025 2025 AFC Asian Cup qualifiers	India	3–4	Kyrgyzstan	Yogyakarta, Indonesia
11:30 UTC+5:30	Drishti Pant 3'; Khushbu Saroj 34', 40'	AFC; AIFF	Aizhan Boronbekova 10'; Nursuluu Murzakulova 12' (pen.); Rebecca Zamthianmawi 20' (o.g.); Nazik Kumyshbek Kyzy 40'	Stadium: Among Rogo Sports Hall

=== 2026 ===
13 January 2026 2026 SAFF Championship	Maldives	1–11	India	Bangkok, Thailand
12:30 IST	Achom Degio 39' (o.g.)	SAFF; AIFF	Mithila Ramani 4'; Ritika Singh 6', 17'; Khushbu Saroj 17', 22', 24', 26'; Sonali Mondal 17', 37'; Nishka Parkash 33', 34'	Stadium: Nonthaburi Stadium; Attendance: 20; Referee: Khamprasong Xayavongsy (Laos)

15 January 2026 2026 SAFF Championship	Bangladesh	3–1	India	Bangkok, Thailand
12:30 IST	Sabina Khatun 7', 11'; Sumaya Matsushima 31'	SAFF; AIFF	Arya More 37'	Stadium: Nonthaburi Stadium; Attendance: 50; Referee: Benjapol Mucharoensap (Thailand)

17 January 2026 2026 SAFF Championship	India	8–1	Nepal	Bangkok, Thailand
15:00 IST	Diti Kanungo 4', 4', 13', 15'; Nishka Parkash 8'; Ritika Singh 22', 37'; Khushbu Saroj 24'	SAFF; AIFF	Manisha Thapa Magar 8'	Stadium: Nonthaburi Stadium, Bangkok; Attendance: 40; Referee: Benjapol Mucharoensap (Thailand)

19 January 2026 2026 SAFF Championship	India	5–3	Pakistan	Bangkok, Thailand
17:30 IST	Arya More 14'; Ritika Singh 28'; Khushbu Saroj 29'; Diti Kanungo 37', 40'	SAFF; AIFF	Kayanat Bokhari 4'; Azwa Chaudhry 26'; Anmool Hira 27'	Stadium: Nonthaburi Stadium; Attendance: 50; Referee: Nattakit Hintua (Thailand)

23 January 2026 2026 SAFF Championship	Bhutan	2–1	India	Bangkok, Thailand
17:30 IST	Jamyang Choden 20'; Deki Lhazom 28'	SAFF; AIFF	Khushbu Saroj 36'	Stadium: Nonthaburi Stadium; Attendance: 43; Referee: Ali Ahmadi (Iran)

25 January 2026 2026 SAFF Championship	Sri Lanka	2–5	India	Bangkok, Thailand
15:00 IST	Shanu Paskaran 22'; Gowry Surenthiran 28'	SAFF; AIFF	Sonali Mondal 6', 7', 16'; Mithila Ramani 9'; Pooja Gupta 36'	Stadium: Hua Mak Indoor Stadium; Attendance: 50; Referee: Benjapol Mucharoensap (Thailand)

=== Result by confederation ===
Confederation	Pld	W	D	L	GF	GA	GD	Win %	First meeting	Last meeting
AFC	9	4	0	5	34	27	+7	44.44	2025	2026
CAF	0	0	0	0	0	0	0	0	—N/a	—N/a
CONCACAF	0	0	0	0	0	0	0	0	—N/a	—N/a
CONMEBOL	0	0	0	0	0	0	0	0	—N/a	—N/a
OFC	0	0	0	0	0	0	0	0	—N/a	—N/a
UEFA	0	0	0	0	0	0	0	0	—N/a	—N/a
FIFA	9	4	0	5	34	27	+7	44.44%	2025	2026

== See also ==
- India national futsal team results
