= 2026 SAFF Women's Futsal Championship squads =

The following squads were announced for the tournament. Each team is permitted to register their official player lineup and coaching staff.

== Bangladesh ==
Bangladesh announced their final squad on 14 December 2025.

Head coach: (Iran) Saeid Khodarahmi

Note: Flags indicate national team as defined under FIFA eligibility rules; some limited exceptions apply. Players may hold more than one non-FIFA nationality.

No.	Pos.	Nation	Player
1		BAN	Sabina Khatun (Captain)
2		BAN	Sumaya Matsushima
3		BAN	Masura Parvin
4		BAN	Krishna Rani Sarkar
5		BAN	Lipi Akter
6		BAN	Mehenur Akhter
7		BAN	Nouson Jahan
8		BAN	Nilufa Yesmin Nila

No.	Pos.	Nation	Player
9		BAN	Marzia
10		BAN	Ratri Moni
11		BAN	Mst Sumi Khatun
12		BAN	Mishrat Jahan Moushumi
13		BAN	Etie Rani (GK)
14		BAN	Sathi Biswas (GK)
15		BAN	Shopna Akter Jili (GK)

== Bhutan ==
Bhutan's final squad was announced on 24 December 2025.

Head coach: (Bhutan) Passang Tshering

Note: Flags indicate national team as defined under FIFA eligibility rules; some limited exceptions apply. Players may hold more than one non-FIFA nationality.

No.	Pos.	Nation	Player
—		BHU	Sangita Monger (GK)
—		BHU	Kelden Wangmo
—		BHU	Jamyang Choden
—		BHU	Tshering Yangchen
—		BHU	Phuntsho Choden
—		BHU	Tshering Lhaden
—		BHU	Tshering Yangden

No.	Pos.	Nation	Player
—		BHU	Pema Kuenzang Choeki
—		BHU	Deki Lhazom
—		BHU	Sonam Lhamo (Captain)
—		BHU	Namgyel Dema
—		BHU	Karma Yuden (GK)
—		BHU	Sunita Rai
—		BHU	Yeshey Bidha

== India ==
India named their final squad on 6 January 2026.

Head coach: (India) Joshuah Vaz

Note: Flags indicate national team as defined under FIFA eligibility rules; some limited exceptions apply. Players may hold more than one non-FIFA nationality.

No.	Pos.	Nation	Player
—		IND	Tanvi Mavani (GK)
—		IND	Achom Degio
—		IND	Radhika Patel
—		IND	Mithila Ramani
—		IND	Nishka Parkash
—		IND	Arya More
—		IND	Jigmet Chunzen (Captain)

No.	Pos.	Nation	Player
—		IND	Khushbu Saroj
—		IND	Sonali Mondal
—		IND	Ritika Singh
—		IND	Diti Kanungo
—		IND	Pooja Gupta
—		IND	Aiswarya Arumugam
—		IND	Aarushi Santhosh

== Maldives ==
Maldives named their final lineup on 7 January 2026.

Head coach: (Maldives) Athif Mohamed

Note: Flags indicate national team as defined under FIFA eligibility rules; some limited exceptions apply. Players may hold more than one non-FIFA nationality.

No.	Pos.	Nation	Player
1		MDV	Saiga Hussain (GK)
2		MDV	Mariyam Shafa Binth Ahmed Ali
3		MDV	Fathimath Sausan (GK)
4		MDV	Aiminath Shaamila
5		MDV	Fathimath Faiha Ali
6		MDV	Fathimath Saliya (Captain)
7		MDV	Aminath Fazla

No.	Pos.	Nation	Player
8		MDV	Mariyam Rifa
9		MDV	Fathimath Saina
10		MDV	Mariyam Noora
11		MDV	Fathimath Afza
12		MDV	Raniya Ibrahim
13		MDV	Fathimath Inaasha Adam
14		MDV	Hawwa Haneefa

== Nepal ==
Nepal's squad was announced on 7 January 2026.

Head coach: (Nepal) Bikram Maharjan

Note: Flags indicate national team as defined under FIFA eligibility rules; some limited exceptions apply. Players may hold more than one non-FIFA nationality.

No.	Pos.	Nation	Player
1		NEP	Sabitri Kishan (GK)
2		NEP	Anjali Machamasi
3		NEP	Bimala Chaudhary
4		NEP	Bimala Thapa
5		NEP	Jharana Dumrakoti (GK)
6		NEP	Dipa Rai (Captain)
7		NEP	Jennifer Rana

No.	Pos.	Nation	Player
8		NEP	Manisha Thapa Magar
9		NEP	Praktishya Thakuri
10		NEP	Roshani Bohara Chettri
11		NEP	Sajina Koirala
12		NEP	Sunkala Rai
13		NEP	Sushma Tamang
14		NEP	Anita KC

== Pakistan ==
Pakistan's squad was announced on 13 January 2026.

Head coach: (Iran) Fatemeh Sharif

Note: Flags indicate national team as defined under FIFA eligibility rules; some limited exceptions apply. Players may hold more than one non-FIFA nationality.

No.	Pos.	Nation	Player
1		PAK	Jennah Farooki (GK)
2		PAK	Zeeyana Jivraj (GK)
3		PAK	Aliya Sadiq
4		PAK	Aiman Ali
5		PAK	Alina Ispahani
6		PAK	Fatima Nasir
7		PAK	Sibal Fawad

No.	Pos.	Nation	Player
8		PAK	Kayanat Bokhari (Captain)
9		PAK	Azwa Chaudhry
10		PAK	Amani Khan
11		PAK	Khadija Kazmi
12		PAK	Ghazala Amir
13		PAK	Anmool Hira
14		PAK	Syeda Mahpara (GK)

== Sri Lanka ==
Sri Lanka's squad was announced on 11 January 2026.

Head coach: (Sri Lanka) Rajamany Devasagayam

Note: Flags indicate national team as defined under FIFA eligibility rules; some limited exceptions apply. Players may hold more than one non-FIFA nationality.

No.	Pos.	Nation	Player
1		SRI	Sakura Sewwandi (GK)
4		SRI	Aathika Asfar
5		SRI	Dulini De Silva
8		SRI	Shanu Lakmali
9		SRI	Shanu Baskaran
10		SRI	Gowry Surenthiran
11		SRI	Stephanie Dias (Captain)

No.	Pos.	Nation	Player
12		SRI	Sanduni Sewmini
16		SRI	Tharindi Welivita
17		SRI	Imesha Warnakulasuriya
17		SRI	Tharmika Siwaneswaran
20		SRI	Lochani Sooriyarachchi
22		SRI	Ashani Imesha (GK)
