= Maldives women's national futsal team =

Represents Maldives in women's international futsal

Maldives
- Association: FAM
- Confederation: AFC (Asia); SAFF (South Asia)
- Head coach: Athif Mohamed
- FIFA code: MDV
- FIFA ranking: 96 (8 May 2026)
Home colours	Away colours

First international
- Maldives 1–11 India (Bangkok, Thailand; 13 January 2026)

Biggest defeat
- Bangladesh 14–2 Maldives (Bangkok, Thailand; 25 January 2026)

SAFF Women's Futsal Championship
- Appearances: 1 (First in 2026)
- Best result: Group stage (2026)

The Maldives women's national futsal team represents Maldives in women's international futsal. The team is controlled by the governing body for association football in Maldives, Football Association of Maldives (FAM), which is currently a member of the Asian Football Confederation (AFC) and the regional South Asian Football Federation (SAFF).

== History ==
=== Early attempts ===
The Football Association of Maldives made an initial attempt to establish a women's national futsal team in 2017, with the aim of participating in the 2018 AFC Women's Futsal Championship. Although an entry was reportedly submitted, the team did not ultimately take part in the competition, and the initiative did not materialise.

=== Formation ===
A women's futsal programme was introduced by the Football Association of Maldives in 2025 as part of efforts to develop the sport and increase women's participation. The national team was subsequently formed in January 2026, with players primarily selected from the 2025 FAM Women's League and the Maldives women's national football team.

=== International debut ===
The Maldives made its international debut at the SAFF Women's Futsal Championship in 2026, which marked the inaugural edition of the competition. The team's first match was played against India, resulting in an 11–1 defeat. Maldives scored its first international futsal goal during the match, which was recorded as an own goal.

During the tournament, Maldives also recorded its heaviest defeat, a 14–2 loss against Bangladesh. The team lost all of its matches in the competition, with its closest result being a 7–6 defeat to Sri Lanka.

== Coaching staff ==
Following is the current coaching staff.

Role	Name
Head coach	(Maldives) Athif Mohamed
Assistant coach	(Maldives) Mohamed Ihsan Saeed
Team Manager	(Maldives) Aminath Siyana
Doctor	(Maldives) Aminath Nifsha
Goalkeeping coach	(Maldives) Ibrahim Ahmed
Kit manager	(Maldives) Ismail Naseer

== Players ==
The following players were named to the squad for the 2026 SAFF Women's Futsal Championship from 13 to 25 January 2026.

No.	Pos.	Player	Date of birth (age)	Caps	Goals	Club
1	GK	Saiga Hussain			0	(Football Association of Maldives)
2	FP	Mariyam Shafa Binth Ahmed Ali			0	(Football Association of Maldives)
3	GK	Fathimath Sausan			0	(Football Association of Maldives)
4	FP	Aiminath Shaamila			0	(Football Association of Maldives)
5	FP	Fathimath Faiha Ali			0	(Football Association of Maldives)
6	FP	Fathimath Saliya			2	(Football Association of Maldives)
7	FP	Aminath Fazla			2	(Football Association of Maldives)
8	FP	Mariyam Rifa			0	(Football Association of Maldives)
9	FP	Fathimath Saina			0	(Football Association of Maldives)
10	FP	Mariyam Noora			2	(Football Association of Maldives)
11	FP	Fathimath Afza			0	(Football Association of Maldives)
12	FP	Raniya Ibrahim			3	(Football Association of Maldives)
13	FP	Fathimath Inaasha Adam			0	(Football Association of Maldives)
14	FP	Hawwa Haneefa			0	(Football Association of Maldives)

== Competitive record ==
*Draws include knockout matches decided on penalty kicks.

=== FIFA Women's Futsal World Cup ===
FIFA Futsal Women's World Cup record
Year	Result	GP	W	D*	L	GS	GA	GD	Squad	Coach
(Philippines) 2025	Did not exist									
Total	0/0	–	–	–	–	–	–	–	—	

=== AFC Women's Futsal Asian Cup ===
AFC Women's Futsal Asian Cup record
Year	Result	GP	W	D*	L	GS	GA	GD	Squad	Coach
(Malaysia) 2015	Did not exist									
(Thailand) 2018	Did not exist									
(China) 2025	Did not exist									
(Myanmar) 2027	To be determined									
Total	0/0	–	–	–	–	–	–	–	—	

=== SAFF Women's Futsal Championship ===
SAFF Women's Futsal Championship record
Year	Result	GP	W	D*	L	GS	GA	GD	Squad	Coach
(Thailand) 2026	7th	6	0	0	6	12	44	−32	squad	(Maldives) Athif Mohamed
Total	1/1	6	0	0	6	12	44	−32	—	

== Results and fixtures ==
=== 2026 ===
13 January 2026 2026 SAFF Championship	Maldives	1–11	India	Bangkok, Thailand
14:00 (ICT, UTC+7)	Achom Degio 39' (o.g.)	Report	Mithila Ramani 4'; Ritika Singh 6', 17'; Khushbu Saroj 17', 22', 24', 26'; Sonali Mondal 17', 37'; Nishka Parkash 33', 34'	Stadium: Nonthaburi Stadium, Bangkok; Attendance: 20; Referee: Khamprasong Xayavongsy (Laos)

15 January 2026 2026 SAFF Championship	Maldives	0–5	Nepal	Bangkok, Thailand
16:30 (ICT, UTC+7)		Report	Jenifer Rana 4', 12'; Bimala Chaudhary 11'; Manisha Thapa Magar 18'; Fathimath Saina 39' (o.g.)	Stadium: Nonthaburi Stadium, Bangkok; Attendance: 86; Referee: Vaja Vishal Mahendrabhai (India)

17 January 2026 2026 SAFF Championship	Maldives	1–3	Pakistan	Bangkok, Thailand
19:00 (ICT, UTC+7)	Mariyam Noora 9'	Report	Azwa Chaudhry 3'; Kayanat Bokhari 16'; Anmool Hira 23'	Stadium: Nonthaburi Stadium; Attendance: 37; Referee: Nicholas Backo (Australia)

21 January 2026 2026 SAFF Championship	Bhutan	4–2	Maldives	Bangkok, Thailand
19:00 (ICT, UTC+7)	Pema Kuenzang Choeki 6'; Yeshey Bidha 13'; Namgyel Dema 28'; Tshering Lhaden 34'}	Report	Raniya Ibrahim 9'; Fathimath Saliya 39'	Stadium: Nonthaburi Stadium; Attendance: 36; Referee: Vaja Vishal Mahendrabhai (India)

23 January 2026 2026 SAFF Championship	Sri Lanka	7–6	Maldives	Bangkok, Thailand
16:30 (ICT, UTC+7)	Imesha Warnakulasuriya 2', 10', 31'; Tharidi Weliwita 6', 17'; Hawwa Haneefa 27' (o.g.); Mariyam Noora 37' (o.g.)	Report	Aminath Fazla 10', 26'; Stephni Dias 13' (o.g.); Fathimath Saliya 14'; Tharmika Sivaneswaran 30' (o.g.); Raniya Ibrahim 40' (2pen.)	Stadium: Nonthaburi Stadium; Attendance: 50; Referee: Mohammad Javad Ehtesham (Iran)

25 January 2026 2026 SAFF Championship	Bangladesh	14–2	Maldives	Bangkok, Thailand
11:00 (ICT, UTC+7)	Sabina Khatun 10', 14', 23', 30'; Lipi Akter 17', 18', 32'; Krishna Rani Sarkar 17', 34'; Sumaya Matsushima 24'; Nilufa Yesmin Nila 31'; Mehenur Akhter 32'; Masura Parvin 36'	Report	Raniya Ibrahim 4'; Mariyam Noora 40'	Stadium: Hua Mak Indoor Stadium

== Head-to-head records ==
As of 25 January 2026

The following table shows Maldives' head-to-head records. (includes all matches)

Positive record
Neutral record
Negative record

Against	M	W	D	L	GF	GA	GD
Sri Lanka	1	0	0	1	6	7	-1
Nepal	1	0	0	1	0	5	-5
India	1	0	0	1	1	11	-10
Bangladesh	1	0	0	1	2	14	-12
Pakistan	1	0	0	1	1	3	-2
Bhutan	1	0	0	1	2	4	-2
Total	6	0	0	6	12	44	-32

== See also ==
- Maldives national futsal team
