= India women's national futsal team =

Women's national futsal team representing India

India
- Shirt badge/Association crest
- Nickname(s): Futsal Tigresses
- Association: All India Football Federation
- Confederation: AFC (Asia); SAFF (South Asia)
- Head coach: Joshuah Vaz
- Captain: Jigmet Chunzen
- Most caps: Khusbhu Saroj (9)
- Top scorer: Khushbu Saroj (9)
- FIFA code: IND
- FIFA ranking: 82 (24 September 2026)
Home colours	Away colours

First international
- Hong Kong 5–0 India (Yogyakarta, Indonesia; 15 January 2025)

Biggest win
- Maldives 1–11 India (Bangkok, Thailand; 13 January 2026)

Biggest defeat
- India 0–6 Indonesia (Yogyakarta, Indonesia; 17 January 2025)

FIFA World Cup
- Appearances: 0 (First in 0)
- Best result: 0

AFC Women's Futsal Asian Cup
- Appearances: 0

SAFF Futsal Championship
- Appearances: 1 (First in 2026)
- Best result: 2nd (2026)

The India women's national futsal team represents India in international futsal competitions. The team is controlled by the All India Football Federation (AIFF) and governed by the Asian Football Confederation (AFC).

India made its debut against Hong Kong at the 2025 AFC Women's Futsal Asian Cup qualification on 15 January in Yogyakarta, Indonesia.

== History ==
=== Formation, debut and first tournament ===
On 11 October 2024, the AFC announced 19 national teams that would be participating in the draws for the 2025 AFC Women's Futsal Asian Cup qualification. India was one of the nine new entrants for the qualification tournament. On 5 November, the AIFF announced that trials to select the first ever women's national futsal team commenced in Bhavnagar, Gujarat. The trials were held for six days in which 121 players from 15 states participated, out of which 25 players were shortlisted for the first national camp from 11 to 15 November 2024. Nineteen players were shortlisted from the first camp, that was followed by a second camp held in December. On 9 January 2025, the final squad of fourteen players were announced for the Asian Cup qualifiers.

The 2025 AFC Women's Futsal Asian Cup qualification was the first ever international tournament for the national side. India was drawn in Group B alongside host Indonesia, Hong Kong, Kyrgyzstan and Pakistan on 17 October 2024. However, Pakistan withdrew its team from participating in the tournament in December 2024. On 15 January, in the debut match India lost 0–5 against Hong Kong. In the second match against the host Indonesia, India could not score and lost the match by 6–0. In the final match against Kyrgyzstan on 19 January 2025, India managed to score three goals. However, India lost the match by a narrow margin of 4–3 and failed to qualify for the 2025 AFC Women's Futsal Asian Cup. Drishti Pant scored the first goal for India in the third minute of the match, thus becoming the first ever goal scorer for India in women's futsal.

=== 2026–present ===
In May 2025, at the South Asian Football Federation (SAFF) Congress in Kathmandu, it was proposed that a SAFF Futsal Championship would be held annually. On 5 October 2025, SAFF announced that the first ever SAFF Futsal Championship for both men and women would be held from 13 to 26 January 2026, in Thailand. The tournament was in round-robin format. Out of the six matches, India recorded four wins and two losses, finishing as runners-up in the tournament. India won against the Maldives, Nepal, Pakistan and Sri Lanka and the two losses were against Bangladesh and Bhutan. On 13 January 2026, in the first match against the Maldives, India registered their first ever win. They defeated the Maldives by 11–0 which is also their biggest win to date. In this match, Khushbu Saroj scored 4 goals, thus becoming the first ever hat-trick scorer for the national team.

== Competitive record ==
=== FIFA Futsal Women's World Cup ===
FIFA Futsal Women's World Cup record
Year	Result	Position	Pld	W	T	L	GF	GA
(Philippines) 2025	Did not qualify							
Total	0/0	0	0	0	0	0	0	0

=== AFC Women's Futsal Asian Cup ===
AFC Women's Futsal Asian Cup record									Qualification record					
Year	Result	Position	Pld	W	T	L	GF	GA	Pld	W	T	L	GF	GA
(Malaysia) 2015	Did not exist								No qualification tournament					
(Thailand) 2018	Did not exist								No qualification tournament					
(Kuwait) 2020	Cancelled due to COVID-19 pandemic								No qualification tournament					
(China) 2025	Did not qualify								3	0	0	3	3	15
Total	0/0	0	0	0	0	0	0	0	3	0	0	3	3	15

=== SAFF Futsal Championship ===
SAFF Championship records
Host/Year	Round	Position	GP	W	D	L	GF	GA
(Thailand) 2026	Runners-up	2nd	6	4	0	2	31	12
Total	1/1	0 Title	6	4	0	2	31	12

== Results and fixtures ==
For past match results of the national team, see the team's results page.

Matches in the last 12 months, and future scheduled matches Win Draw Loss Fixture

=== 2026 ===
13 January 2026 2026 SAFF Championship	Maldives	1–11	India	Bangkok, Thailand
12:30 IST	Achom Degio 39' (o.g.)		Mithila Ramani 4'; Ritika Singh 6', 17'; Khushbu Saroj 17', 22', 24', 26'; Sonali Mondal 17', 37'; Nishka Parkash 33', 34'	Stadium: Nonthaburi Stadium; Attendance: 20

15 January 2026 2026 SAFF Championship	Bangladesh	3–1	India	Bangkok, Thailand
12:30 IST	Sabina Khatun 7', 11'; Sumaya Matsushima 31'		Arya More 37'	Stadium: Nonthaburi Stadium; Attendance: 50

17 January 2026 2026 SAFF Championship	India	8–1	Nepal	Bangkok, Thailand
15:00 IST	Diti Kanungo 4', 4', 13', 15'; Nishka Parkash 8'; Ritika Singh 22', 37'; Khushbu Saroj 24'	Report	Manisha Thapa Magar 8'	Stadium: Nonthaburi Stadium, Bangkok; Attendance: 40; Referee: Benjapol Mucharoensap (Thailand)

19 January 2026 2026 SAFF Championship	India	5–3	Pakistan	Bangkok, Thailand
17:30 IST	Arya More 14'; Ritika Singh 28'; Khushbu Saroj 29'; Diti Kanungo 37', 40'	Report	Kayanat Bokhari 4'; Azwa Chaudhry 26'; Anmool Hira 27'	Stadium: Nonthaburi Stadium; Attendance: 50; Referee: Nattakit Hintua (Thailand)

23 January 2026 2026 SAFF Championship	Bhutan	2–1	India	Bangkok, Thailand
17:30 IST	Jamyang Choden 20'; Deki Lhazom 28'	Report	Khushbu Saroj 36'	Stadium: Nonthaburi Stadium; Attendance: 43; Referee: Ali Ahmadi (Iran)

25 January 2026 2026 SAFF Championship	Sri Lanka	2–5	India	Bangkok, Thailand
15:00 IST	Shanu Paskaran 22'; Gowry Surenthiran 28'	Report	Sonali Mondal 6', 7', 16'; Mithila Ramani 9'; Pooja Gupta 36'	Stadium: Hua Mak Indoor Stadium; Attendance: 50; Referee: Benjapol Mucharoensap (Thailand)

== Head-to-head records ==
As of 26 January 2026 vs Sri Lanka

The following table shows India's head-to-head records. (includes all matches)

Positive record
Neutral record
Negative record

Opponent	Pld	W	D	L	GF	GA	GD
Bangladesh	1	0	0	1	1	3	–2
Bhutan	1	0	0	1	1	2	–1
Hong Kong	1	0	0	1	0	5	–5
Indonesia	1	0	0	1	0	6	–6
Kyrgyzstan	1	0	0	1	3	4	–1
Maldives	1	1	0	0	11	1	+10
Nepal	1	1	0	0	8	1	+7
Sri Lanka	1	1	0	0	5	2	+3
Pakistan	1	1	0	0	5	3	+2
Total	9	4	0	5	34	27	+7

== Coaching staff ==
Position	Name	Ref.
Head coach	(India) Joshuah Vaz	
Assistant coach	(India) Judon Dominic D’Souza	
Goalkeeping coach	(India) Veerababu Sivaneni	

== Players ==
=== Current squad ===
Following 14 players were named in the squad for the 2026 SAFF Women's Futsal Championship.

No.	Pos.	Player	Date of birth (age)	Caps	Goals	Club
	GK	Tanvi Mavani	11 March 2004 (age 22)	3	0	(All India Football Federation) ARA FC
	GK	Aiswarya Arumugam		0	0	
	DF	Achom Degio				(All India Football Federation) East Kameng DFA
	DF	Arya More				(All India Football Federation) Aspire FC
	DF	Radhika Patel				(All India Football Federation) ARA FC
	DF	Jigmet Chunzen (Captain)				
	MF	Pooja Gupta				(All India Football Federation) Aspire FC
	MF	Ritika Singh				(All India Football Federation) Aspire FC
	MF	Aarushi Santhosh				
	MF	Diti Kanungo				
	MF	Nishka Parkash				
	MF	Sonali Mondal				
	FW	Khushbu Saroj		9	9	(All India Football Federation) Kemp FC
	FW	Mithila Ramani				

=== Recent callups ===
The following footballers were part of national selection in the past twelve months, but are not part of the current call-up.

Pos.	Player	Date of birth (age)	Caps	Goals	Club	Latest call-up

== See also ==
- Futsal Club Championship
- Futsal Association of India
- Football in India
- History of Indian football
- India national football team
- India women's national football team
- Sport in India
