= Bangladesh women's national football team results (2020–present) =

This article provides details of international football games played by the Bangladesh women's national football team from 2020 to present.

== Results ==
Key
Win
Draw
Defeat

=== 2021 ===
26 September 2021 FIFA Friendly	Bangladesh	5–0	Hong Kong	Tashkent, Uzbekistan
16:00 UTC+6	T. Khatun 18'; S. Khatun 43', 53', 57', 85'			Stadium: JAR Stadium

22 September 2021 2022 AFC Women's Asian Cup qualification Group G	Iran	5–0	Bangladesh	Tashkent, Uzbekistan
16:00 UTC+6	Motevalli 4'; Khosravi 14'; Taherkhani 31' (pen.), 61' (pen.); Dabbaghi 55'	Report		Stadium: Milliy Stadium; Attendance: 0 Referee: Edita Mirabidova (Uzbekistan)

19 September 2021 2022 AFC Women's Asian Cup qualification Group G	Bangladesh	0–5	Jordan	Tashkent, Uzbekistan
16:00 UTC+6		Report	Jebreen 35'; Al Bitar 45'; Jbarah 62', 67', 77'	Stadium: Milliy Stadium; Attendance: 0 Referee: Oh Hyeon-jeong (South Korea)

12 September 2021 FIFA Friendly	Nepal	0–0	Bangladesh	Kathmandu, Nepal
17:15 BST		Report		Stadium: Dasharath Rangasala

9 September 2021 FIFA Friendly	Nepal	2–1	Bangladesh	Kathmandu, Nepal
17:15 BST	Sabita Rana 13' Prity Roy 32'	Report	Tohura Khatun 83'	Stadium: Dasharath Rangasala

=== 2022 ===
19 September 2022 2022 SAFF W F	Bangladesh	3–1	Nepal	Kathmandu, Nepal
17:00	Shamsunnahar Jr. 13'; Sarkar 42', 77'	Report	Anita 70'	Stadium: Dashrath Stadium; Attendance: 15730; Referee: Tekcham Ranjita Devi (India)

16 September 2022 2022 SAFF W SF	Bangladesh	8–0	Bhutan	Kathmandu, Nepal
13:00	Shopna 2'; Sabina 18', 54', 90+3'; Sarkar 30'; Ritu Chakma 35'; Masura 57'; Tohura 87'	Report		Stadium: Dashrath Stadium; Attendance: 282; Referee: Tekcham Ranjita Devi (India)

13 September 2022 2022 SAFF W GS	India	0–3	Bangladesh	Kathmandu, Nepal
17:30		Report	Shopna 12', 52'; Sarkar 22'	Stadium: Dashrath Stadium; Attendance: 279; Referee: Choki Om (Bhutan)

10 September 2022 2022 SAFF W GS	Pakistan	0–6	Bangladesh	Kathmandu, Nepal
13:00		Report	Monika 3'; Shopna 28'; Sabina 31', 35', 59'; Ritu Chakma 77'	Stadium: Dashrath Stadium; Attendance: 205; Referee: Choki Om (Bhutan)

7 September 2022 2022 SAFF W GS	Bangladesh	3–0	Maldives	Kathmandu, Nepal
17:30	Sabina 32', 40'; Masura 34'	Report		Stadium: Dashrath Stadium; Attendance: 240; Referee: Anjana Rai (Nepal)

26 June 2022 Friendly	Bangladesh	0–0	Malaysia	Dhaka, Bangladesh
BST (UTC+6)				Stadium: Bir Sherestha Shaheed Shipahi Mostafa Kamal Stadium

23 June 2022 Friendly	Bangladesh	6–0	Malaysia	Dhaka, Bangladesh
BST (UTC+6)	Akhi 9', 29'; Sabina 25'; Shopna 44'; Chakma 66'; Rani 73'			Stadium: Bir Sherestha Shaheed Shipahi Mostafa Kamal Stadium

=== 2023 ===
4 December 2023 Friendly	Bangladesh	8–0	Singapore	Dhaka, Bangladesh
15:00 BST (UTC+6)	T. Khatun 16', 24'; Ritu Chakma 18', 62'; S. Akhter 57'; Khatun 75'; Matsushima 87'; Shamsunnahar Jr. 90+1'	Report		Stadium: Bir Sherestha Shaheed Shipahi Mostafa Kamal Stadium; Referee: Choki Om (Bhutan)

1 December 2023 Friendly	Bangladesh	3–0	Singapore	Dhaka, Bangladesh
16:00 BST (UTC+6)	Khandakar 3'; T. Khatun 16', 60'	Report (BFF)		Stadium: Bir Sherestha Shaheed Shipahi Mostafa Kamal Stadium; Referee: Appuhamila Pabasara Minisarani (Sri Lanka)

28 September 2023 Football at the 2023 Asian Games Group D	Nepal	1–1	Bangladesh	Wenzhou, China
14:00 BST (UTC+6)	Rekha Poudel 82'	Report	Khatun 44'	Stadium: Wenzhou Sports Centre; Attendance: 3,304; Referee: Yu Hong (China)

25 September 2023 Football at the 2023 Asian Games Group D	Bangladesh	1–6	Vietnam	Wenzhou, China
18:00 BST (UTC+6)	Parvin 87' (pen.)	Report	Phạm Hải Yến 5'; Nguyễn Thị Thúy Hằng 34'; Trần Thị Duyên 66'; Thái Thị Thảo 78'; Nguyễn Thị Bích Thùy 71', 80'	Stadium: Wenzhou Sports Centre; Attendance: 2,108; Referee: Yu Hong (China)

22 September 2023 Football at the 2023 Asian Games Group D	Japan	8–0	Bangladesh	Wenzhou, China
21:30 BST (UTC+6)	Chiba 7', 29'; Tanikawa 8' (pen.), 80'; Shiokoshi 45'; Hijikata 49'; Sakakibara 58', 85'	Report		Stadium: Wenzhou Sports Centre; Attendance: 2,744; Referee: Kim Yu-jeong (South Korea)

16 July 2023 Friendly	Bangladesh	0–0 (2–4 p)	Nepal	Dhaka, Bangladesh
17:30 UTC+6		Report		Stadium: Bir Sherestha Shaheed Shipahi Mostafa Kamal Stadium; Referee: Kanika Barman (India)

13 July 2023 Friendly	Bangladesh	1–1	Nepal	Dhaka, Bangladesh
17:30 UTC+6	Khatun 66'	Report	Bhandari 90+1'	Stadium: Bir Sherestha Shaheed Shipahi Mostafa Kamal Stadium; Referee: Choki Om (Bhutan)

=== 2024 ===
31 May Friendly	Bangladesh	0–4	Chinese Taipei	Dhaka, Bangladesh
17:45 BST (UTC+6)		Report	Su Yu-hsuan 12', 27', 56'; Su Sin-yun 19'	Stadium: Bashundhara Kings Arena; Referee: Choki Om (Bhutan)

3 June Friendly	Bangladesh	0–1	Chinese Taipei	Dhaka, Bangladesh
17:45 BST (UTC+6)		Report	Su Yu-hsuan 17'	Stadium: Bashundhara Kings Arena; Referee: Yapa Pabasara Minisaraniyapa (Sri Lanka)

24 July Friendly	Bhutan	1–5	Bangladesh	Thimphu, Bhutan
18:00 UTC+6	Tshering 13'	Report	Mst. Sagorika 49', 76', 90+2'; S. Khatun 53'; Chakma 54'	Stadium: Changlimithang Stadium; Referee: H.M. Malika Madhushani (Sri Lanka)

27 July Friendly	Bhutan	2–4	Bangladesh	Thimphu, Bhutan
18:00 UTC+6	Lhazom 14', 21'	Report	Sabina 34'; Mst Sahorika 39'; Dorji Edon 61' (o.g.); Ritu Porna 86'	Stadium: Changlimithang Stadium; Referee: Y.A. Pabasara Minisaraniyapa (Sri Lanka)

20 October 2024 2024 SAFF W GS	Bangladesh	1–1	Pakistan	Kathmandu, Nepal
17:45 BST (UTC+6)	Shamsunnahar Jr. 90+1'	Report	Malik 32'	Stadium: Dashrath Stadium; Attendance: 307; Referee: Choki Om (Bhutan)

23 October 2024 2024 SAFF W GS	India	1–3	Bangladesh	Kathmandu, Nepal
17:45 BST (UTC+6)			Tohura Khatun Afeida Khandaker	Stadium: Dashrath Stadium

27 October 2024 2024 SAFF W SF	Bangladesh	7–1	Bhutan	Kathmandu, Nepal
13:45 BST (UTC+6)	Ritu 7'; Tohura 15', 35', 58'; Sabina 26', 37'; Sheuli 72'	Report	Lhazom 41'	Stadium: Dasharath Rangasala, Attendance: 486; Referee: Y.A. Pabasara Minisaraniyapa (Sri Lanka)

30 October 2024 2024 SAFF W F	Bangladesh	2–1	Nepal	Kathmandu, Nepal
18:30 BST (UTC+6)	Monika 52'; Ritu 81'	Report	Amisha Karki 56'	Stadium: Dasharath Rangasala; Attendance: 15,373; Referee: Kanika Barman (India)

=== 2025 ===
26 February 2025 Friendly	United Arab Emirates	3–1	Bangladesh	Dubai, United Arab Emirates
21:30 BST (UTC+6)	Elizabeth Forshaw 18'; Georgia Gibson 28', 73'	Report	Afeida Khandaker 35' (pen.)	Stadium: Theyab Awana Stadium; Referee: Alissar Baddour (Syria)

2 March 2025 Friendly	United Arab Emirates	3–1	Bangladesh	Dubai, United Arab Emirates
21:30 BST (UTC+6)	Nouf Faleh 32'; Mia Lindborg 40'; Georgia Gibson 58'	Report	Afeida Khandaker 80' (pen.)	Stadium: Theyab Awana Stadium; Referee: Alissar Baddour (Syria)

31 May 2025 Women's Tri-Nation Cup	Bangladesh	0–0	Indonesia	Amman, Jordan
20:00 BST (UTC+6)		Report		Stadium: King Abdullah Stadium; Referee: Perissa Nasr (Lebanon)

3 June 2025 Women's Tri-Nation Cup	Jordan	2–2	Bangladesh	Amman, Jordan
22:00 BST (UTC+6)	Jbarah 5'; Al Bitar 58'	Report	Shamsunnahar 43'; Ripa 81'	Stadium: King Abdullah Stadium; Referee: Heba Saadieh (Palestine)

29 June 2025 2026 AFC Women's Asian Cup qualification	Bahrain	0–7	Bangladesh	Yangon, Myanmar
16:30 BST (UTC+6)		Report	Shamsunnahar Jr. 10'; Ritu 15'; Kohati 40'; Tohura 45+2', 45+3'; Rawan Al Ali 59' (o.g.); Munki 74'	Stadium: Thuwunna Stadium; Referee: Kanika Barman (India)

2 July 2025 2026 AFC Women's Asian Cup qualification	Bangladesh	2–1	Myanmar	Yangon, Myanmar
15:30 BST (UTC+6)	Ritu 19', 70'	Report	Win Win 89'	Stadium: Thuwunna Stadium; Referee: Esraa Almbaiden (Jordan)

5 July 2025 2026 AFC Women's Asian Cup qualification	Bangladesh	7–0	Turkmenistan	Yangon, Myanmar
BST (UTC+6)	Rani 4'; Shamsunnahar Jr. 6', 13'; Chakma 16'; Porna 17', 41'; Khatun 20'	Report		Stadium: Thuwunna Stadium; Referee: Mu Mingxin (China)

24 October 2025 Friendly	Thailand	3–0	Bangladesh	Bangkok, Thailand
17:00 BST (UTC+6)	O. Waenngoen 1'; S. Pengngam 51'; P. Aupachai 86'	Report		Stadium: Thonburi University Stadium; Referee: Ms Bui Thi Thu Trang (Vietnam)

27 October 2025 Friendly	Thailand	5–1	Bangladesh	Bangkok, Thailand
17:00 BST (UTC+6)	Pengngam 12'; Chiraphon Mangkhaldee 23'; Madison Jett Castain 34', 54'; Mongkoldee 60' (pen.)	Report	Shamsunnahar 29'	Stadium: Thonburi University Stadium; Referee: Ms Bui Thi Thu Trang (Vietnam)

November Bangladesh Tri-Nations Cup	Bangladesh	0–1	Malaysia	Dhaka, Bangladesh
18:00 BST (UTC+6)		Report	Nur Ainsyah Murad 29'	Stadium: National Stadium; Referee: Om Choki (Bhutan)

November Bangladesh Tri-Nations Cup	Bangladesh	1–2	Azerbaijan	Dhaka, Bangladesh
18:00 BST (UTC+6)	Manda 33'	Report	Jafarzade 19'; Manya 83'	Stadium: National Stadium; Referee: Om Choki (Bhutan)

=== 2026 ===
25 February 2026 Closed Door Unofficial Friendly	Bangladesh	1–1	(Australia) Sydney Wanderers	Sydney, Australia
03:00 BST (UTC+6)		Report

3 March 2026 AFC Women's Asian Cup GS	Bangladesh	0–2	China	Sydney, Australia
14:00 BST (UTC+6)		Report (AFC); Report (FIFA)	Wang Shuang 44'; Zhang Rui 45+1'	Stadium: Western Sydney Stadium; Attendance: 6,006; Referee: Pansa Chaisanit (Thailand)

6 March 2026 AFC Women's Asian Cup GS	Bangladesh	0–5	North Korea	Sydney, Australia
08:00 BST (UTC+6)		Report (AFC); Report (FIFA)	Myong Yu-jong 45+5' (pen.); Kim Kyong-yong 45+7', 64'; Chae Un-yong 62'; Kim Hye-yong 90'	Stadium: Western Sydney Stadium; Attendance: 2,102; Referee: Doumouh Al Bakkar (Lebanon)

9 March 2026 AFC Women's Asian Cup GS	Bangladesh	0–4	Uzbekistan	Perth, Australia
BST (UTC+6)		Report (AFC); Report (FIFA)	Khabibullaeva 10', 62', 66'; Kudratova 88'	Stadium: Perth Rectangular Stadium; Attendance: 1,117; Referee: Mahnaz Zokaee (Iran)

10 May 2026 Unofficial friendly	Bangladesh	2–0	(Thailand) Kasem Bundit	Bangkok, Thailand
16:00 BST (UTC+6)	Anika 15'; Umehla 77'	Report		Stadium: Alpine Football Training Camm (Pitch 1)

17 May 2026 Unofficial friendly	Bangladesh	0–2	(Thailand) Bangkok WFC	Bangkok, Thailand
16:00 BST (UTC+6)		Report		Stadium: Alpine Football Training Camm (Pitch 1)

29 May 2026 2026 SAFF GS	Bangladesh	4–2	Maldives	Margao, India
20:00 BST (UTC+6)	Siddiqui 1'; Marma 34'; Prity 63'; Kisku 90+5'	Report	Noora 42'; Fazla 57'	Stadium: Jawaharlal Nehru Stadium; Attendance: 127; Referee: Rachana Kamani (India)

31 May 2026 2026 SAFF GS	India	3–0	Bangladesh	Margao, India
20:00 BST (UTC+6)	Xaxa 36'; Kom 78' (pen.); Prasad 90+1'	Report		Stadium: Jawaharlal Nehru Stadium; Attendance: 553; Referee: Choki Om (Bhutan)

3 June 2026 2026 SAFF SF	Nepal	1–2	Bangladesh	Margao, India
16:30 BST (UTC+6)	Rana 22'	Report	R. Chakma 45+1'; Preeti Rai 90+3' (o.g.)	Stadium: Jawaharlal Nehru Stadium; Attendance: 289; Referee: Choki Om (Bhutan)

5 June 2026 2026 SAFF F	Bangladesh	1–3	India	Margao, India
19:00 BST (UTC+6)	R. Chakma 45+1'	Report	Xaxa 42'; Nongrum 46'; Kom 82'	Stadium: Jawaharlal Nehru Stadium; Attendance: 729; Referee: Anjana Rai (Nepal)

14 September 2026 Football at the 2026 Asian Games Group F	Bangladesh	0–10	North Korea	Osaka, Japan
13:00 BST (UTC+6)		Report	Jon Ryong-Jong 5', 10'; Hwang Yu-Yong 12'; Chae Un-Yong 18', 35'; Kim Kyong-yong 40', 43'; Ri Song-a 51'; Jong Kum 60'; Han Jin-Hong 90'	Stadium: Nagai Stadium; Attendance: 1,343; Referee: Plong Pich Akara (Cambodia)

17 September 2026 Football at the 2026 Asian Games Group F	Bangladesh	0–6	South Korea	Osaka, Japan
13:00 BST (UTC+6)	Kim Min-ji 16'; Jeong Da-bin 42'; Choe Yu-ri 65'; Ji So-yun 77'; Hyun Seul-gi 79'; Ko Yoo-jin 90+1'	Report		Stadium: Nagai Stadium; Attendance: 135; Referee: Fatemeh Nasiri Looshani (Iran)

21 September 2026 Football at the 2026 Asian Games Group F	Bangladesh	0–0	Myanmar	Osaka, Japan
13:00 BST (UTC+6)		Report		Stadium: Nagai Stadium; Attendance: 571; Referee: Roziyabonu Yusupova (Uzbekistan)
