= Bangladesh women's national football team results =

This is a list of the Bangladesh women's national football team results from 2010 to the present.

== Record ==
=== By competition ===
As of 30 October 2024

Opponent	GP	W	D	L	GF	GA	GD
2020 Olympics Q	3	0	0	3	2	13	–11
Football at the Asian Games Women's tournament	3	0	1	2	2	15	–13
Summer Olympics – Women's Asian Qualifiers	2	0	0	2	0	6	–6
AFC Women's Asian Cup Qualification	5	0	0	5	0	25	–25
Football at the South Asian Games – Women's tournament	8	4	0	4	8	17	–9
SAFF Women's Championship	27	16	2	9	74	37	+37
Total	48	20	3	25	86	113	–27

Source: Results

=== By venue ===
As of 3 May 2025

Venue	GP	W	D	L	GF	GA	GD
Home	21	7	3	11	32	44	-12
Away	17	4	6	9	22	34	-12
Neutral	29	15	3	11	70	57	13
Total	67	26	12	31	124	135	-11

As of 17 September 2026

Against	Region	P	W	D	L	GF	GA	GD	%Win	First match	Most recent match
Nepal	AFC	13	2	5	6	9	18	−9	15.38	29 January 2010	30 October 2024
Chinese Taipei	AFC	2	0	0	2	0	5	−5	0.00	3 June 2024	31 May 2024
Sri Lanka	AFC	4	3	0	1	7	3	+4	75.00	31 January 2010	7 February 2016
Pakistan	AFC	3	2	1	0	8	1	+7	66.67	2 February 2010	20 October 2024
India	AFC	12	2	1	9	10	44	−34	16.67	6 February 2010	23 October 2023
Bhutan	AFC	7	7	0	0	36	4	+32	100.00	15 December 2010	27 October 2024
Uzbekistan	AFC	2	0	0	2	0	7	−7	0.00	20 March 2011	9 March 2026
Thailand	AFC	3	0	0	3	1	17	−16	0.00	21 May 2013	27 October 2025
Iran	AFC	2	0	0	2	0	7	−7	0.00	23 May 2013	22 September 2021
Philippines	AFC	1	0	0	1	0	4	−4	0.00	25 May 2013	
Afghanistan	AFC	2	2	0	0	12	1	+11	100.00	13 November 2014	16 December 2016
Maldives	AFC	4	4	0	0	14	1	+13	100.00	17 November 2014	7 September 2022
Singapore	AFC	3	2	0	1	11	3	+8	66.67	16 February 2017	4 December 2023
Malaysia	AFC	4	1	1	2	7	3	+4	25.00	17 February 2017	26 November 2025
Myanmar	AFC	2	1	0	1	2	6	−4	50.00	8 November 2018	2 July 2025
Jordan	AFC	2	0	1	1	2	7	−5	0.00	19 September 2021	3 June 2025
Hong Kong	AFC	1	1	0	0	5	0	+5	100.00	26 September 2021	
Japan	AFC	1	0	0	1	0	8	−8	0.00	22 September 2023	22 September 2023
Vietnam	AFC	1	0	0	1	1	6	−5	0.00	25 September 2023	25 September 2023
United Arab Emirates	AFC	2	0	0	2	2	6	−4	0.00	26 February 2025	2 March 2025
Indonesia	AFC	1	0	1	0	0	0	+0	0.00	31 May 2025	31 May 2025
Bahrain	AFC	1	1	0	0	7	0	+7	100.00	29 June 2025	29 June 2025
Turkmenistan	AFC	1	1	0	0	7	0	+7	100.00	5 July 2025	5 July 2025
Azerbaijan	UEFA	1	0	0	1	1	2	−1	0.00	2 December 2025	2 December 2025
China	AFC	1	0	0	1	0	2	−2	0.00	3 March 2026	3 March 2026
North Korea	AFC	2	0	0	2	0	15	−15	0.00	6 March 2026	14 September 2026
South Korea	AFC	1	0	0	1	0	6	−6	0.00	17 September 2026	17 September 2026
Total		79	29	10	40	142	176	−34	36.71	29 January 2010	17 September 2026

Source: Results

== Results and fixtures ==
=== 2026 ===
25 February 2026 Friendly	Bangladesh	1–1	(Australia) Sydney Wanderers	Sydney, Australia
03:00 BST (UTC+6)		Report		Attendance: 0 (Note: Behind closed doors)

3 March 2026 AFC Women's Asian Cup GS	Bangladesh	0–2	China	Sydney, Australia
14:00 BST (UTC+6)		Report (AFC); Report (FIFA)	Wang Shuang 44'; Zhang Rui 45+1'	Stadium: Western Sydney Stadium; Attendance: 6,006; Referee: Pansa Chaisanit (Thailand)

6 March 2026 AFC Women's Asian Cup GS	Bangladesh	0–5	North Korea	Sydney, Australia
08:00 BST (UTC+6)		Report (AFC); Report (FIFA)	Myong Yu-jong 45+5' (pen.); Kim Kyong-yong 45+7', 64'; Chae Un-yong 62'; Kim Hye-yong 90'	Stadium: Western Sydney Stadium; Attendance: 2,102; Referee: Doumouh Al Bakkar (Lebanon)

9 March 2026 AFC Women's Asian Cup GS	Bangladesh	0–4	Uzbekistan	Perth, Australia
15:00 BST (UTC+6)		Report (AFC); Report (FIFA)	Khabibullaeva 10', 62', 66'; Kudratova 88'	Stadium: Perth Rectangular Stadium; Attendance: 1,117; Referee: Mahnaz Zokaee (Iran)

10 May 2026 Unofficial friendly	Bangladesh	2–0	(Thailand) Kasem Bundit	Bangkok, Thailand
16:00 BST (UTC+6)	Anika 15'; Umehla 77'	Report		Stadium: Alpine Football Training Camm (Pitch 1); Attendance: 0 (Note: Behind closed doors)

17 May 2026 Unofficial friendly	Bangladesh	0–2	(Thailand) Bangkok WFC	Bangkok, Thailand
16:00 BST (UTC+6)		Report		Stadium: Alpine Football Training Camm (Pitch 1); Attendance: 0 (Note: Behind closed doors)

29 May 2026 2026 SAFF GS	Bangladesh	4–2	Maldives	Margao, India
20:00 BST (UTC+6)	Siddiqui 1'; Marma 34'; Prity 63'; Kisku 90+5'	Report	Noora 42'; Fazla 57'	Stadium: Jawaharlal Nehru Stadium; Attendance: 127; Referee: Rachana Kamani (India)

31 May 2026 2026 SAFF GS	Bangladesh	0–3	India	Margao, India
20:00 BST (UTC+6)		Report	Xaxa 36'; Kom 78' (pen.); Prasad 90+1'	Stadium: Jawaharlal Nehru Stadium; Attendance: 553; Referee: Choki Om (Bhutan)

3 June 2026 2026 SAFF SF	Nepal	1–2	Bangladesh	Margao, India
16:30 BST (UTC+6)	Rana 22'	Report	R. Chakma 45+1'; Preeti Rai 90+3' (o.g.)	Stadium: Jawaharlal Nehru Stadium; Attendance: 289; Referee: Choki Om (Bhutan)

5 June 2026 2026 SAFF F	Bangladesh	1–3	India	Margao, India
19:00 BST (UTC+6)	R. Chakma 45+1'	Report	Xaxa 42'; Nongrum 46'; Kom 82'	Stadium: Jawaharlal Nehru Stadium; Attendance: 729; Referee: Anjana Rai (Nepal)

14 September 2026 Football at the 2026 Asian Games Group F	Bangladesh	0–10	North Korea	Osaka, Japan
13:00 BST (UTC+6)		Report	Jon Ryong-Jong 5', 10'; Hwang Yu-Yong 12'; Chae Un-Yong 18', 35'; Kim Kyong-yong 40', 43'; Ri Song-a 51'; Jong Kum 60'; Han Jin-Hong 90'	Stadium: Nagai Stadium; Attendance: 1,343; Referee: Plong Pich Akara (Cambodia)

17 September 2026 Football at the 2026 Asian Games Group F	Bangladesh	0–6	South Korea	Osaka, Japan
13:00 BST (UTC+6)		Report	Kim Min-ji 16'; Jeong Da-bin 42'; Choe Yu-ri 65'; Ji So-yun 77'; Hyun Seul-gi 79'; Ko Yoo-jin 90+1'	Stadium: Nagai Stadium; Attendance: 135; Referee: Fatemeh Nasiri Looshani (Iran)

21 September 2026 Football at the 2026 Asian Games Group F	Bangladesh	0–0	Myanmar	Osaka, Japan
13:00 BST (UTC+6)		Report		Stadium: Nagai Stadium; Attendance: 571; Referee: Roziyabonu Yusupova (Uzbekistan)

- Bangladesh Results and Fixtures – Soccerway.com

=== 2025 ===
26 February 2025 Friendly	Bangladesh	1–3	United Arab Emirates	Dubai, United Arab Emirates
21:30 BST (UTC+6)	Afeida Khandaker 35' (pen.)	Report	Elizabeth Forshaw 18'; Georgia Gibson 28', 73'	Stadium: Theyab Awana Stadium; Referee: Alissar Baddour (Syria)

2 March 2025 Friendly	Bangladesh	1–3	United Arab Emirates	Dubai, United Arab Emirates
21:30 BST (UTC+6)	Afeida Khandaker 80' (pen.)	Report	Nouf Faleh 32'; Mia Lindborg 40'; Georgia Gibson 58'	Stadium: Theyab Awana Stadium; Referee: Alissar Baddour (Syria)

31 May 2025 Women's Tri-Nation Cup	Bangladesh	0–0	Indonesia	Amman, Jordan
20:00 BST (UTC+6)		Report		Stadium: King Abdullah Stadium; Referee: Perissa Nasr (Lebanon)

3 June 2025 Women's Tri-Nation Cup	Bangladesh	2–2	Jordan	Amman, Jordan
22:00 BST (UTC+6)	Shamsunnahar 43'; Ripa 81'	Report	Jbarah 5'; Al Bitar 58'	Stadium: King Abdullah Stadium; Referee: Heba Saadieh (Palestine)

29 June 2025 2026 AFC Women's Asian Cup qualification	Bangladesh	7–0	Bahrain	Yangon, Myanmar
16:30 BST (UTC+6)	Shamsunnahar Jr. 10'; Ritu 15'; Kohati 40'; Tohura 45+2', 45+3'; Rawan Al Ali 59' (o.g.); Munki 74'	Report		Stadium: Thuwunna Stadium; Referee: Kanika Barman (India)

2 July 2025 2026 AFC Women's Asian Cup qualification	Bangladesh	2–1	Myanmar	Yangon, Myanmar
15:30 BST (UTC+6)	Ritu 19', 70'	Report	Win Win 89'	Stadium: Thuwunna Stadium; Referee: Esraa Almbaiden (Jordan)

5 July 2025 2026 AFC Women's Asian Cup qualification	Bangladesh	7–0	Turkmenistan	Yangon, Myanmar
BST (UTC+6)	Rani 4'; Shamsunnahar Jr. 6', 13'; Chakma 16'; Porna 17', 41'; Khatun 20'	Report		Stadium: Thuwunna Stadium; Referee: Mu Mingxin (China)

24 October 2025 Friendly	Bangladesh	0–3	Thailand	Bangkok, Thailand
17:00 BST (UTC+6)		Report	O. Waenngoen 1'; S. Pengngam 51'; P. Aupachai 86'	Stadium: Thonburi University Stadium; Referee: Ms Bui Thi Thu Trang (Vietnam)

27 October 2025 Friendly	Bangladesh	1–5	Thailand	Bangkok, Thailand
17:00 BST (UTC+6)	Shamsunnahar 29'	Report	S. Pengngam 12'; Chiraphon Mangkhaldee 23'; Madison Jett Castain 34', 54'; Mongkoldee 60' (pen.)	Stadium: Thonburi University Stadium; Referee: Ms Bui Thi Thu Trang (Vietnam)

26 November 2025 Bangladesh Tri-Nations Cup	Bangladesh	0–1	Malaysia	Dhaka, Bangladesh
18:00 UTC+6		Report	Nur Ainsyah Murad 29'	Stadium: National Stadium; Referee: Om Choki (Bhutan)

2 December 2025 Bangladesh Tri-Nations Cup	Bangladesh	1–2	Azerbaijan	Dhaka, Bangladesh
18:00 UTC+6	Manda 33'	Report	Jafarzade 19'; Esra Manya 83'	Stadium: National Stadium; Referee: Om Choki (Bhutan)

=== 2024 ===
31 May 2024 Friendly	Bangladesh	0–4	Chinese Taipei	Dhaka, Bangladesh
17:45 BST (UTC+6)		Report	Su Yu-hsuan 12', 27', 56'; Su Sin-yun 19'	Stadium: Bashundhara Kings Arena; Referee: Choki Om (Bhutan)

3 June 2024 Friendly	Bangladesh	0–1	Chinese Taipei	Dhaka, Bangladesh
17:45 BST (UTC+6)		Report	Su Yu-hsuan 17'	Stadium: Bashundhara Kings Arena; Referee: Yapa Pabasara Minisaraniyapa (Sri Lanka)

24 July 2024 Friendly	Bangladesh	5–1	Bhutan	Thimphu, Bhutan
18:00 UTC+6	Mst. Sagorika 49', 76', 90+2'; S. Khatun 53'; Chakma 54'	Report	Tshering 13'	Stadium: Changlimithang Stadium; Referee: H.M. Malika Madhushani (Sri Lanka)

27 July 2024 Friendly	Bangladesh	4–2	Bhutan	Thimphu, Bhutan
18:00 UTC+6	Sabina 34'; Mst. Sagorika 39'; Dorji Edon 61' (o.g.); Ritu Porna 86'	Report	Lhazom 14', 21'	Stadium: Changlimithang Stadium; Referee: Y.A. Pabasara Minisaraniyapa (Sri Lanka)

20 October 2024 2024 SAFF W GS	Bangladesh	1–1	Pakistan	Kathmandu, Nepal
17:45 BST (UTC+6)	Shamsunnahar Jr. 90+1'	Report	Malik 32'	Stadium: Dashrath Stadium; Attendance: 307; Referee: Choki Om (Bhutan)

23 October 2024 2024 SAFF W GS	Bangladesh	3–1	India	Kathmandu, Nepal
17:45 BST (UTC+6)	Afeida Khandaker 19'; Tohura 29', 42'	Report	Bala Devi 44'	Stadium: Dashrath Stadium

27 October 2024 2024 SAFF W SF	Bangladesh	7–1	Bhutan	Kathmandu, Nepal
13:45 BST (UTC+6)	Ritu 7'; Tohura 15', 35', 58'; Sabina 26', 37'; Sheuli 72'	Report	Lhazom 41'	Stadium: Dasharath Rangasala; Attendance: 486; Referee: Y.A. Pabasara Minisaraniyapa (Sri Lanka)

30 October 2024 2024 SAFF W F	Bangladesh	2–1	Nepal	Kathmandu, Nepal
18:30 BST (UTC+6)	Monika 52'; Ritu 81'	Report	Amisha Karki 56'	Stadium: Dasharath Rangasala; Attendance: 15,373; Referee: Kanika Barman (India)

=== 2023 ===
4 December 2023 Friendly	Bangladesh	8–0	Singapore	Dhaka, Bangladesh
15:00 BST (UTC+6)	T. Khatun 16', 24'; Ritu Chakma 18', 62'; S. Akhter 57'; Khatun 75'; Matsushima 87'; Shamsunnahar Jr. 90+1'	Report		Stadium: Bir Sherestha Shaheed Shipahi Mostafa Kamal Stadium; Referee: Choki Om (Bhutan)

1 December 2023 Friendly	Bangladesh	3–0	Singapore	Dhaka, Bangladesh
16:00 BST (UTC+6)	Khandakar 3'; T. Khatun 16', 60'	Report (BFF)		Stadium: Bir Sherestha Shaheed Shipahi Mostafa Kamal Stadium; Referee: Appuhamila Pabasara Minisarani (Sri Lanka)

28 September 2023 Football at the 2023 Asian Games Group D	Bangladesh	1–1	Nepal	Wenzhou, China
14:00 BST (UTC+6)	Khatun 44'	Report	Rekha Poudel 82'	Stadium: Wenzhou Sports Centre; Attendance: 3,304; Referee: Yu Hong (China)

25 September 2023 Football at the 2023 Asian Games Group D	Bangladesh	1–6	Vietnam	Wenzhou, China
18:00 BST (UTC+6)	Parvin 87' (pen.)	Report	Phạm Hải Yến 5'; Nguyễn Thị Thúy Hằng 34'; Trần Thị Duyên 66'; Thái Thị Thảo 78'; Nguyễn Thị Bích Thùy 71', 80'	Stadium: Wenzhou Sports Centre; Attendance: 2,108; Referee: Yu Hong (China)

22 September 2023 Football at the 2023 Asian Games Group D	Bangladesh	0–8	Japan	Wenzhou, China
21:30 BST (UTC+6)		Report	Chiba 7', 29'; Tanikawa 8' (pen.), 80'; Shiokoshi 45'; Hijikata 49'; Sakakibara 58', 85'	Stadium: Wenzhou Sports Centre; Attendance: 2,744; Referee: Kim Yu-jeong (South Korea)

16 July 2023 Friendly	Bangladesh	0–0 (2–4 p)	Nepal	Dhaka, Bangladesh
17:30 UTC+6		Report		Stadium: Bir Sherestha Shaheed Shipahi Mostafa Kamal Stadium; Referee: Kanika Barman (India)

13 July 2023 Friendly	Bangladesh	1–1	Nepal	Dhaka, Bangladesh
17:30 UTC+6	Khatun 66'	Report	Bhandari 90+1'	Stadium: Bir Sherestha Shaheed Shipahi Mostafa Kamal Stadium; Referee: Choki Om (Bhutan)

=== 2022 ===
19 September 2022 2022 SAFF W F	Bangladesh	3–1	Nepal	Kathmandu, Nepal
17:00	Shamsunnahar Jr. 13'; Sarkar 42', 77'	Report	Anita 70'	Stadium: Dashrath Stadium; Attendance: 15730; Referee: Tekcham Ranjita Devi (India)

16 September 2022 2022 SAFF W SF	Bangladesh	8–0	Bhutan	Kathmandu, Nepal
13:00	Shopna 2'; Sabina 18', 54', 90+3'; Sarkar 30'; Ritu Chakma 35'; Masura 57'; Tohura 87'	Report		Stadium: Dashrath Stadium; Attendance: 282; Referee: Tekcham Ranjita Devi (India)

13 September 2022 2022 SAFF W GS	Bangladesh	3–0	India	Kathmandu, Nepal
17:30	Shopna 12', 52'; Sarkar 22'	Report		Stadium: Dashrath Stadium; Attendance: 279; Referee: Choki Om (Bhutan)

10 September 2022 2022 SAFF W GS	Bangladesh	6–0	Pakistan	Kathmandu, Nepal
13:00	Monika 3'; Shopna 28'; Sabina 31', 35', 59'; Ritu Chakma 77'	Report		Stadium: Dashrath Stadium; Attendance: 205; Referee: Choki Om (Bhutan)

7 September 2022 2022 SAFF W GS	Bangladesh	3–0	Maldives	Kathmandu, Nepal
17:30	Sabina 32', 40'; Masura 34'	Report		Stadium: Dashrath Stadium; Attendance: 240; Referee: Anjana Rai (Nepal)

26 June 2022 Friendly	Bangladesh	0–0	Malaysia	Dhaka, Bangladesh
BST (UTC+6)				Stadium: Bir Sherestha Shaheed Shipahi Mostafa Kamal Stadium

23 June 2022 Friendly	Bangladesh	6–0	Malaysia	Dhaka, Bangladesh
BST (UTC+6)	Akhi 9', 29'; Sabina 25'; Shopna 44'; Chakma 66'; Rani 73'			Stadium: Bir Sherestha Shaheed Shipahi Mostafa Kamal Stadium

=== 2021 ===
26 September 2021 FIFA Friendly	Bangladesh	5–0	Hong Kong	Tashkent, Uzbekistan
16:00 UTC+6	T. Khatun 18'; S. Khatun 43', 53', 57', 85'			Stadium: JAR Stadium

22 September 2021 2022 AFC Women's Asian Cup qualification Group G	Bangladesh	0–5	Iran	Tashkent, Uzbekistan
16:00 UTC+6		Report	Motevalli 4'; Khosravi 14'; Taherkhani 31' (pen.), 61' (pen.); Dabbaghi 55'	Stadium: Milliy Stadium; Attendance: 0 Referee: Edita Mirabidova (Uzbekistan)

19 September 2021 2022 AFC Women's Asian Cup qualification Group G	Bangladesh	0–5	Jordan	Tashkent, Uzbekistan
16:00 UTC+6		Report	Jebreen 35'; Al Bitar 45'; Jbarah 62', 67', 77'	Stadium: Milliy Stadium; Attendance: 0 Referee: Oh Hyeon-jeong (South Korea)

12 September 2021 FIFA Friendly	Bangladesh	0–0	Nepal	Kathmandu, Nepal
17:15 BST		Report		Stadium: Dasharath Rangasala

9 September 2021 FIFA Friendly	Bangladesh	1–2	Nepal	Kathmandu, Nepal
17:15 BST	Tohura Khatun 83'	Report	Sabita Rana 13'; Preeti Rai 32'	Stadium: Dasharath Rangasala

=== 2019 ===
20 March 2019 2019 SAFF Championship	Bangladesh	0–4	India	Biratnagar, Nepal
15:30 UTC+5:45		AIFF	Indumathi 22', 37'; Dalima 18'; Manisha 93+3'	Stadium: Sahid Rangsala

16 March 2019 2019 SAFF Championship	Bangladesh	0–3	Nepal	Biratnagar, Nepal
15:30 UTC+5:45		SAFF	Parvin 6' (o.g.); Sabitra 23'; Manjali 28'	Stadium: Sahid Rangsala; Attendance: 4687

14 March 2019 2019 SAFF Championship	Bangladesh	2–0	Bhutan	Biratnagar, Nepal
15:30 UTC+5:45	Moushumi 18'; Sabina 85'			Stadium: Sahid Rangsala
