= 2026 SAFF Women's Futsal Championship =

International women's futsal competition

Tournament details
- Host country: Thailand
- Dates: 13–25 January 2026
- Teams: 7 (from 1 sub-confederation)
- Venues: 2 (in 1 host city)

Final positions
- Champions: Bangladesh (1st title)
- Runners-up: India
- Third place: Bhutan

Tournament statistics
- Matches played: 21
- Goals scored: 146 (6.95 per match)
- Attendance: 1,039 (49 per match)
- Top scorer(s): (Bangladesh) Sabina Khatun (14 goals in 6 matches)

The 2026 SAFF Women's Futsal Championship was the inaugural edition of the SAFF Women's Futsal Championship, a biennial international futsal tournament organised by the South Asian Football Federation (SAFF) for women's national teams from South Asia. The tournament was played in Bangkok, Thailand, from 13 to 25 January 2026.

The championship will also featured capacity-building courses for coaches and referees, aimed at strengthening the development of women's futsal in the region.

== Venue ==
SAFF General Secretary Purushottam Kattel stated that Thailand was selected due to its infrastructure, accessibility, and limited futsal experience among member nations. Potential India–Pakistan logistical considerations were also cited as a factor.

Venue in Thailand
Bangkok		2026 SAFF Women's Futsal Championship (Thailand)
Nonthaburi Stadium	Hua Mak Indoor Stadium	2026 SAFF Women's Futsal Championship (Thailand)
Capacity: 4,000	Capacity: 8,000	2026 SAFF Women's Futsal Championship (Thailand)
Nonthaburi Province Stadium outside image		2026 SAFF Women's Futsal Championship (Thailand)

== Participating teams ==
All seven SAFF member associations made their debut in the inaugural edition.

Country	Appearance	Previous best	FIFA Futsal ranking (December 2025)
Bangladesh	1st (Debut)	—N/a	44
Bhutan	1st (Debut)	—N/a	NR
India	1st (Debut)	—N/a	86
Maldives	1st (Debut)	—N/a	NR
Nepal	1st (Debut)	—N/a	NR
Pakistan	1st (Debut)	—N/a	NR
Sri Lanka	1st (Debut)	—N/a	NR

== Match officials ==
Due to the limited number of SAFF futsal referees, SAFF appointed 10 futsal referees to officiate the tournament, nine of whom were from outside the regional body.

Referees

- (Football Australia) Nicholas Backo
- (All India Football Federation) Vaja Vishal Mahendrabhai
- (Football Federation Islamic Republic of Iran) Ali Ahmadi
- (Football Federation Islamic Republic of Iran) Mohammad Javad Ehtesham
- (Football Federation Islamic Republic of Iran) Ali Hafizi
- (Lao Football Federation) Khampasong Xayavongsy
- (New Zealand Football) Chris Sinclair
- (Football Association of Thailand) Benjapol Mucharoensap
- (Football Association of Thailand) Chonlakan Luangsa-Ard
- (Football Association of Thailand) Nattakit Hintua

Match Commissioners

- (Football Association of Maldives) Shahir Ahmed
- (Bhutan Football Federation) D. Tashi Wangmo
- (All India Football Federation) Jonathan De Souza
- (All India Football Federation) Arunava Bhattacharya

Referee Accessors

- (Iran) Mahmud-Reza Nasirloo
- (Thailand) Krutsri Presser

== Standings ==
Pos	Team	Pld	W	D	L	GF	GA	GD	Pts	Result	BAN	IND	BHU	NEP	PAK	SRI	MDV
1	Bangladesh (C)	6	5	1	0	38	10	+28	16	Champions		3–1	3–3	3–0	9–1	6–3	14–2
2	India	6	4	0	2	31	12	+19	12	Runners-up				8–1	5–3		
3	Bhutan	6	3	2	1	18	13	+5	11	Third-place		2–1				5–1	4–2
4	Nepal	6	3	1	2	18	17	+1	10				5–3		5–1		
5	Pakistan	6	2	1	3	12	23	−11	7				1–1			3–2	
6	Sri Lanka	6	1	1	4	17	27	−10	4			2–5		2–2			7–6
7	Maldives	6	0	0	6	12	44	−32	0			1–11		0–5	1–3		

Source: Matchfoari
Legend: Blue = home team win; Yellow = draw; Red = away team win.
(C) Champions

== Matches ==
The SAFF had released its official match schedule for the season, detailing dates, venues, and kickoff times for all games.

13 January 2026
14:00
Match 1

Maldives	1–11	India
Achom Degio 39' (o.g.)	Report	Mithila Ramani 4'; Ritika Singh 6', 17'; Khushbu Saroj 17', 22', 24', 26'; Sonali Mondal 17', 37'; Nishka Parkash 33', 34'

Nonthaburi Stadium, Bangkok, Thailand
Attendance: 20
Referee: Khamprasong Xayavongsy (Laos)
13 January 2026
17:00
Match 2

Pakistan	1–1	Bhutan
K. Bokhari 23'	Report	Yeshey Bidha 26'

Nonthaburi Stadium, Bangkok, Thailand
Attendance: 56
Referee: Benjapol Mucharoensap (Thailand)
13 January 2026
20:00
Match 3

Sri Lanka	2–2	Nepal
Tharmika Sivaneswaran 2'; Tharidi Weliwita 25'	Report	Manisha Thapa Magar 11'; Bimala Chaudhary 15'

Nonthaburi Stadium, Bangkok, Thailand
Attendance: 56
Referee: Vaja Vishal Mahendrabhai (India)

15 January 2026
14:00
Match 4

Bangladesh	3–1	India
Sabina 7', 13'; Matsushima 31'	Report	Arya More 37'

Hua Mak Indoor Stadium, Bangkok, Thailand
Attendance: 50
Referee: Benjapol Mucharoensap (Thailand)
15 January 2026
16:30
Match 5

Maldives	0–5	Nepal
	Report	Jenifer Rana 4', 12'; Bimala Chaudhary 11'; Manisha Thapa Magar 18'; Fathimath Saina 39' (o.g.)

Hua Mak Indoor Stadium, Bangkok, Thailand
Attendance: 86
Referee: Vaja Vishal Mahendrabhai (India)
15 January 2026
19:00
Match 6

Pakistan	3–2	Sri Lanka
Stephni Dias 10' (o.g.); Azwa Chaudhry 22', 38'	Report	Tharmika Sivaneswaran 19'; Stephni Dias 22'

Hua Mak Indoor Stadium, Bangkok, Thailand
Attendance: 50
Referee: Nattakit Hintua (Thailand)

17 January 2026
14:00
Match 7

Bangladesh	3–3	Bhutan
Matsushima 7'; Sabina 35'; Masura 36'	Report	Deki 3'; Sonam Lhamo 27', 30'

Nonthaburi Stadium, Bangkok, Thailand
Attendance: 63
Referee: Vaja Vishal Mahendrabhai (India)
17 January 2026
16:30
Match 8

India	8–1	Nepal
Diti Kanungo 4', 4', 13', 15'; Nishka Parkash 8'; Ritika Singh 22', 37'; Khushbu Saroj 24'	Report	Manisha Thapa Magar 8'

Nonthaburi Stadium, Bangkok, Thailand
Attendance: 40
Referee: Benjapol Mucharoensap (Thailand)
17 January 2026
19:00
Match 9

Maldives	1–3	Pakistan
Mariyam Noora 9'	Report	Azwa Chaudhry 3'; K. Bokhari 16'; Anmool Hira 23'

Nonthaburi Stadium, Bangkok, Thailand
Attendance: 37
Referee: Nicholas Backo (Australia)

19 January 2026
14:00
Match 10

Bangladesh	3–0	Nepal
Sabina 14'; Krishna 19'; Lipi Akter 33'	Report

Nonthaburi Stadium, Bangkok, Thailand
Attendance: 50
Referee: Mohammad Javad Ehtesham (Iran)
19 January 2026
16:30
Match 11

Bhutan	5–1	Sri Lanka
Sunita Rai 7'; Tshering Yangden 28'; Ashani Imesha 29' (o.g.); Lochani Sooriyaarachchi 36' (o.g.); Pema Kuenzang Choeki 40'	Report	Tharidi Weliwita 33'

Nonthaburi Stadium, Bangkok, Thailand
Attendance: 32
Referee: Khampasong Xayavongsy (Laos)
19 January 2026
19:00
Match 12

India	5–3	Pakistan
Arya More 14'; Ritika Singh 28'; Khushbu Saroj 29'; Diti Kanungo 37', 40'	Report	Kayanat Bokhari 4'; Azwa Chaudhry 26'; Anmool Hira 27'

Nonthaburi Stadium, Bangkok, Thailand
Attendance: 50
Referee: Nattakit Hintua (Thailand)

21 January 2026
14:00
Match 13

Bangladesh	6–3	Sri Lanka
Sabina 18', 20'; Matsushima 29'; Krishna 36', 40'; Masura 38'	Report	Shanu Paskaran 13'; Imesha Warnakulasuriya 16', 40'

Nonthaburi Stadium, Bangkok, Thailand
Attendance: 43
Referee: Nicholas Backo (Australia)
21 January 2026
16:30
Match 14

Nepal	5–1	Pakistan
Manisha Thapa Magar 3', 9'; Roshani Bohara Chettri 16'; Dipa Rai 32'; Jennifer Rana 35'	Report	Azwa Chaudhry 27'

Nonthaburi Stadium, Bangkok, Thailand
Attendance: 50
Referee: Chonlakan Luangsa-Ard (Thailand)
21 January 2026
19:00
Match 15

Bhutan	4–2	Maldives
Pema Kuenzang Choeki 6'; Yeshey Bidha 13'; Namgyel Dema 28'; Tshering Lhaden 34'	Report	Raniya Ibrahim 9'; Fathimath Saliya 39'

Nonthaburi Stadium, Bangkok, Thailand
Attendance: 36
Referee: Vaja Vishal Mahendrabhai (India)

23 January 2026
14:00
Match 16

Bangladesh	9–1	Pakistan
Sabina 8', 16', 34', 40'; Nilufa 10'; Nouson Jahan 10', 12'; Krishna 16', 32'	Report	Anmool Hira 33'

Nonthaburi Stadium, Bangkok, Thailand
Attendance: 50
Referee: Nicholas Backo (Australia)
23 January 2026
16:30
Match 17

Sri Lanka	7–6	Maldives
Imesha Warnakulasuriya 2', 10', 31'; Tharidi Weliwita 6', 17'; Hawwa Haneefa 27' (o.g.); Mariyam Noora 37' (o.g.)	Report	Aminath Fazla 10', 26'; Stephni Dias 13' (o.g.); Fathimath Saliya 14'; Tharmika Sivaneswaran 30' (o.g.); Raniya Ibrahim 40' (2pen.)

Nonthaburi Stadium, Bangkok, Thailand
Attendance: 50
Referee: Mohammad Javad Ehtesham (Iran)
23 January 2026
19:00
Match 18

Bhutan	2–1	India
Jamyang Choden 20'; Deki 28'	Report	Khushbu Saroj 36'

Nonthaburi Stadium, Bangkok, Thailand
Attendance: 43
Referee: Ali Ahmadi (Iran)

25 January 2026
11:00
Match 19

Bangladesh	14–2	Maldives
Sabina 10', 14', 23', 30'; Lipi Akter 17', 18', 32'; Krishna 17', 34'; Matsushima 24'; Nilufa 31'; Mehenur Akhter 32'; Masura Parvin 36'	Report	Raniya Ibrahim 4'; Mariyam Noora 40'

Hua Mak Indoor Stadium, Bangkok, Thailand
25 January 2026
14:00
Match 20

Sri Lanka	2–5	India
Shanu Paskaran 22'; Gowry Surenthiran 28'	Report	Sonali Mondal 6', 7', 16'; Mithila Ramani 9'; Pooja Munnalal Gupta 36'

Hua Mak Indoor Stadium, Bangkok, Thailand
Attendance: 50
Referee: Benjapol Mucharoensap (Thailand)
25 January 2026
17:00
Match 21

Nepal	5–3	Bhutan
Sajina Koirala 9'; Anita KC 13'; Jenifer Rana 19', 30'; Sushma Tamang 25'	Report	Deki 23', 26'; Pema Kuenzang Choeki 28'

Hua Mak Indoor Stadium, Bangkok, Thailand
Attendance: 127
Referee: Khampasong Xayavongsy (Laos)

== Statistics ==
=== Goalscorers ===
There were 146 goals scored in 21 matches, for an average of 6.95 goals per match.

14 goals

- (Bangladesh) Sabina Khatun

7 goals

- (Bangladesh) Krishna Rani Sarkar
- (India) Khushbu Saroj

6 goals

- (India) Diti Kanungo

5 goals

- (India) Ritika Singh
- (India) Sonali Mondal
- (Nepal) Manisha Thapa Magar
- (Nepal) Jenifer Rana
- (Pakistan) Azwa Chaudhry
- (Sri Lanka) Imesha Warnakulasuriya

4 goals

- (Bangladesh) Sumaya Matsushima
- (Bangladesh) Lipi Akter
- (Bhutan) Deki Lhazom
- (Sri Lanka) Tharidi Weliwita

3 goals

- (Bangladesh) Masura Parvin
- (Bangladesh) Nouson Jahan
- (Bhutan) Pema Kuenzang Choeki
- (India) Nishka Parkash
- (Maldives) Raniya Ibrahim
- (Pakistan) Kayanat Bokhari
- (Pakistan) Anmool Hira

2 goals

- (Bangladesh) Nilufa Yesmin Nila
- (Bhutan) Yeshey Bidha
- (Bhutan) Sonam Lhamo
- (India) Arya More
- (India) Mithila Ramani
- (Maldives) Aminath Fazla
- (Maldives) Fathimath Saliya
- (Nepal) Bimala Chaudhary
- (Sri Lanka) Tharmika Sivaneswaran

1 goal

- (Bangladesh) Mehenur Akhter
- (Bhutan) Jamyang Choden
- (Bhutan) Namgyel Dema
- (Bhutan) Tshering Lhaden
- (Bhutan) Sunita Rai
- (Bhutan) Tshering Yangden
- (India) Pooja Munnalal Gupta
- (Maldives) Mariyam Noora
- (Nepal) Anita KC
- (Nepal) Dipa Rai
- (Nepal) Roshani Bohara Chettri
- (Nepal) Sajina Koirala
- (Nepal) Sushma Tamang
- (Sri Lanka) Stephni Dias
- (Sri Lanka) Shanu Paskaran

1 own goal

- (Bangladesh) Masura Parvin (against Maldives)
- (India) Achom Degio (against Maldives)
- (Maldives) Hawwa Haneefa (against Sri Lanka)
- (Maldives) Mariyam Noora (against Sri Lanka)
- (Maldives) Fathimath Saina (against Nepal)
- (Sri Lanka) Ashani Imesha (against Bhutan)
- (Sri Lanka) Tharmika Sivaneswaran (against Maldives)
- (Sri Lanka) Lochani Sooriyaarachchi (against Bhutan)

2 own goals

- (Sri Lanka) Stephni Dias (against Pakistan and Maldives)

== Broadcasting ==
Territory	Broadcaster(s)	Reference
No restricted territory	Sportzworkz^{(YouTube channel)}	2026 SAFF Women's Futsal matches's channel on YouTube

== See also ==
- 2026 SAFF Championship
- 2026 SAFF Futsal Championship
- 2026 SAFF Club Championship
- 2026 SAFF U-17 Women's Championship
- 2026 SAFF U-19 Women's Championship
- 2026 SAFF Women's Championship
