= Nepal women's national futsal team =

Represents Nepal in women's international futsal

Nepal
- Association: ANFA
- Confederation: AFC (Asia); SAFF (South Asia)
- Head coach: Bikram Maharjan
- FIFA code: NEP
- FIFA ranking: 91 (8 May 2026)

First international
- Nepal 2-2 Sri Lanka (Bangkok, Thailand; 13 January 2026)

Biggest defeat
- Nepal 1-8 India (Bangkok, Thailand; 17 January 2026)

SAFF Women's Futsal Championship
- Appearances: 1 (First in 2026)
- Best result: Group stage (2026)

The Nepal women's national futsal team represents Nepal in women's international futsal. The team is controlled by the governing body for association football in Nepal, All Nepal Football Association (ANFA), which is currently a member of the Asian Football Confederation (AFC) and the regional South Asian Football Federation (SAFF).

== History ==
A women's futsal program was activated by All Nepal Football Association in 2025. They participated in the 2026 SAFF Women's Futsal Championship. They draw 2-2 in their first international against Srilanka.

== Coaching staff ==
Following is the current coaching staff.

Position	Name
Head coach	(Nepal) Bikram Maharjan
Assistant coach	(Nepal) Naresh Shrestha
Team Manager	(Nepal) Suraj Maharjan
Doctor	(Nepal) Purnima Ghising
Goalkeeping coach	(Nepal) Sumit Kumar Ale
Team Staff	(Nepal) Suman Pradhan

== Players ==
The following players were named to the squad for the 2026 SAFF Women's Futsal Championship from 13 to 25 January 2026.

No.	Pos.	Player	Date of birth (age)	Caps	Goals	Club
1	GK	Sabitri Kishan	29 May 1996 (age 30)		0	(All Nepal Football Association) APF
2	FP	Anjali Machamasi			0	(All Nepal Football Association)
3	FP	Bimala Chaudhary	1 March 1997 (age 29)		1	(All Nepal Football Association) Tribhuvan Army
4	FP	Bimala Thapa			0	(All Nepal Football Association)
5	GK	Jharana Dumrakoti			0	(All Nepal Football Association) Sankata
6	FP	Dipa Rai			0	(All Nepal Football Association)
7	FP	Jennifer Rana			0	(All Nepal Football Association)
8	FP	Manisha Thapa Magar			1	(All Nepal Football Association)
9	FP	Praktishya Thakuri			0	(All Nepal Football Association) Sankata
10	FP	Roshani Bohara Chettri			0	(All Nepal Football Association)
11	FP	Sajina Koirala			0	(All Nepal Football Association)
12	FP	Sunkala Rai			0	(All Nepal Football Association)
13	FP	Sushma Tamang			0	(All Nepal Football Association)
14	FP	Anita KC	5 January 1997 (age 29)		0	(All Nepal Football Association) APF

== Tournament records ==
*Draws include knockout matches decided on penalty kicks.
**Gold background colour indicates that the tournament was won.
***Red border colour indicates tournament was held on home soil.

== Results and fixtures ==
=== 2026 ===
13 January 2026 2026 SAFF Championship	Sri Lanka	2–2	Nepal	Bangkok, Thailand
21:15 NST	Tharmika Siwaneswaran 2'; Tharindi Welivita 25'	Report	Manisha Thapa Magar 11'; Bimala Chaudhary 15'	Stadium: Nonthaburi Stadium, Bangkok; Attendance: 56; Referee: Vaja Vishal Mahendrabhai (India)

15 January 2026 2026 SAFF Championship	Maldives	0–5	Nepal	Bangkok, Thailand
17:45 NST		Report	Jenifer Rana 4', 12'; Bimala Chaudhary 11'; Manisha Thapa Magar 18'; Fathimath Saina 39' (o.g.)	Stadium: Nonthaburi Stadium, Bangkok; Attendance: 86; Referee: Vaja Vishal Mahendrabhai (India)

17 January 2026 2026 SAFF Championship	India	8–1	Nepal	Bangkok, Thailand
17:45 NST	Diti Kanungo 4', 4', 13', 15'; Nishka Parkash 8'; Ritika Singh 22', 37'; Khushbu Saroj 24'	Report	Manisha Thapa Magar 8'	Stadium: Nonthaburi Stadium; Attendance: 40; Referee: Benjapol Mucharoensap (Thailand)

19 January 2026 2026 SAFF Championship	Bangladesh	3–0	Nepal	Bangkok, Thailand
12:45 NST	Sabina Khatun 14'; Krishna Rani Sarkar 19'; Lipi Akter 33'	Report		Stadium: Nonthaburi Stadium; Attendance: 50; Referee: Mohammad Javad Ehtesham (Iran)

21 January 2026 2026 SAFF Championship	Nepal	5–1	Pakistan	Bangkok, Thailand
15:15 NST	Manisha Thapa Magar 3', 9'; Roshani Bohara Chettri 16'; Dipa Rai 32'; Jennifer Rana 35'	Report	Azwa Chaudhry 27'	Stadium: Nonthaburi Stadium; Attendance: 50; Referee: Chonlakan Luangsa-Ard (Thailand)

25 January 2026 2026 SAFF Championship	Nepal	5–3	Bhutan	Bangkok, Thailand
15:45 NST	Sajina Koirala 9'; Anita KC 13'; Jenifer Rana 19', 30'; Sushma Tamang 25'	Report	Deki Lhazom 23', 26'; Pema Kuenzang Choeki 28'	Stadium: Hua Mak Indoor Stadium; Attendance: 127; Referee: Khampasong Xayavongsy (Laos)

== Head-to-head records ==
As of 17 January 2026 vs India

The following table shows Nepal’s head-to-head records. (includes all matches)

Positive record
Neutral record
Negative record

Against	M	W	D	L	GF	GA	GD
Sri Lanka	1	0	1	0	2	2	0
Maldives	1	1	0	0	5	0	+5
India	1	0	0	1	1	8	–7
Bangladesh	1	0	0	1	0	3	–3
Pakistan	1	1	0	0	5	1	+4
Bhutan	1	1	0	0	5	3	+2
Total	6	3	1	2	18	17	+1

== See also ==
- Futsal in Nepal
- Nepal national futsal team
