= Pakistan women's national futsal team =

Women's national futsal team representing Pakistan

Pakistan
- Association: Pakistan Football Federation
- Confederation: AFC (Asia)
- Head coach: Fatemeh Sharif
- Captain: Kayanat Bokhari
- Top scorer: Azwa Chaudhry (5)
- FIFA code: PAK
- FIFA ranking: 94 (8 May 2026)
Home colours	Away colours

First international
- Pakistan 1–1 Bhutan (Bangkok, Thailand; 13 January 2026)

Biggest win
- Maldives 1–3 Pakistan (Bangkok, Thailand; 17 January 2026)

Biggest defeat
- Bangladesh 9–1 Pakistan (Bangkok, Thailand; 23 January 2026)

SAFF Women's Futsal Championship
- Appearances: 1 (First in 2026)
- Best result: Group stage (2026)

The Pakistan women's national futsal team (Urdu: پاکستان ویمنز قومی فٹسال ٹیم) represents Pakistan in international women's futsal competitions and is controlled by the Pakistan Football Federation (PFF).

== History ==
Following the establishment of the FIFA Futsal Women's World Cup and the confirmation of its inaugural edition in 2025, Pakistan registered for the AFC Women's Futsal Asian Cup qualifiers for the first time in June 2024, with the competition doubling as qualification for the World Cup. However, in December of the same year, the federation announced the team's withdrawal due to financial constraints, after being drawn with India, Indonesia, Hong Kong, and the Kyrgyz Republic.

A year later, Pakistan entered the inaugural 2026 SAFF Women's Futsal Championship, held in Thailand from 13 to 25 January 2026. During the tournament, the team played its first international match on 13 January, ending in a 1–1 draw against Bhutan. Two days later, Pakistan achieved their first international win, edging past Sri Lanka 3–2.

== Coaching staff ==
As of 16 January 2026

Role	Name
Head coach	(Iran) Fatemeh Sharif
Assistant coach	(Iran) Solmaz Azimian
Goalkeeper coach	(Iran) Zeinab Saberi
Physiotherapist	(Pakistan) Gul Bashra
Team Manager	(Pakistan) Mejzgaan Orakzai
Media Officer	(Pakistan) Nirmeen Tariq

== Players ==
=== Current squad ===
The following players were called up for the 2026 SAFF Women's Futsal Championship in Thailand, from 13 to 25 January 2026.

- 1 Jennah Farooki (GK)
- 2 Zeeyana Jivraj (age 26) (GK)
- 3 Aliya Sadiq
- 4 Aiman Ali
- 5 Alina Ispahani
- 6 Fatima Nasir
- 7 Sibal Fawad
- 8 Kayanat Bokhari (age 23) (C)
- 9 Azwa Chaudhry (age 19)
- 10 Amani Khan
- 11 Khadija Kazmi
- 12 Ghazala Amir
- 13 Anmool Hira
- 14 Syeda Mahpara

== Competitive record ==
=== FIFA Women's Futsal World Cup ===
FIFA Futsal Women's World Cup record
Year	Result	GP	W	D*	L	GS	GA	GD	Squad	Coach
(Philippines) 2025	Withdrew									
Total	0/0	–	–	–	–	–	–	–	—	

*Draws include knockout matches decided on penalty kicks.

=== AFC Women's Futsal Asian Cup ===
AFC Women's Futsal Asian Cup record
Year	Result	GP	W	D*	L	GS	GA	GD	Squad	Coach
(Malaysia) 2015	Did not exist									
(Thailand) 2018	Did not exist									
(China) 2025	Withdrew									
Total	0/0	–	–	–	–	–	–	–	—	

*Draws include knockout matches decided on penalty kicks.

=== SAFF Women's Futsal Championship ===
SAFF Women's Futsal Championship record
Year	Result	GP	W	D*	L	GS	GA	GD	Squad	Coach
(Thailand) 2026	5th	6	2	1	3	12	23	−11	squad	(Iran) Fatemeh Sharif
Total	1/1	6	2	1	3	12	23	−11	—	

*Draws include knockout matches decided on penalty kicks.

== All-time record ==
As of 23 January 2026
Key

Positive balance (more wins than losses)
Neutral balance (as many wins as losses)
Negative balance (more losses than wins)

Opponent	Pld	W	D	L	GF	GA	GD
Bangladesh	1	0	0	1	1	9	−8
Bhutan	1	0	1	0	1	1	0
India	1	0	0	1	3	5	−2
Maldives	1	1	0	0	3	1	+2
Nepal	1	0	0	1	1	5	−4
Sri Lanka	1	1	0	0	3	2	+1
Total	6	2	1	3	12	23	−11

== See also ==
- Pakistan women's national football team
