= Bangladesh women's national futsal team =

Women's Tutsal Team representing Bangladesh

Bangladesh
- Shirt badge/Association crest
- Nickname(s): Red & Green Tigress
- Association: Bangladesh Football Federation (BFF)
- Confederation: AFC (Asia); SAFF (South Asia)
- Head coach: Said Khodarahmi
- Captain: Sabina Khatun
- Top scorer: Sabina Khatun (15)
- FIFA code: BAN
- FIFA ranking: 42 ▲2 (8 May 2026)
- Highest FIFA ranking: (May–October 2024)
- Lowest FIFA ranking: (May–October 2024)
Home colours	Away colours

First international
- Malaysia 7–1 Bangladesh (Bangkok, Thailand; 2 May 2018)

Biggest win
- Bangladesh 14–2 Maldives (Bangkok, Thailand; 25 January 2026)

Biggest defeat
- Bangladesh 0–7 Vietnam (Bangkok, Thailand; 4 May 2018)

FIFA Futsal Women's World Cup
- Appearances: 0

AFC Women's Futsal Asian Cup
- Appearances: 1 (First in 2018)
- Best result: Group stage (2018)

SAFF Women's Futsal Championship
- Appearances: Champions (2026)

The Bangladesh women's national futsal team (Bengali: বাংলাদেশ মহিলা জাতীয় ফুটসাল দল) represents Bangladesh in international futsal competitions and is controlled by the Bangladesh Football Federation (BFF).

While Bangladesh has yet to participate in the FIFA Futsal Women's World Cup, they have participated once at the AFC Women's Futsal Asian Cup, in 2018.

== History ==
A women's futsal program was activated by the Bangladesh Football Federation in 2018. They qualified directly for the 2018 AFC Women's Futsal Championship, where Sabina Khatun was appointed as captain and Golam Robbani Choton as head coach. They played their first international match against Malaysia, losing by 7–1 on 2 May 2018 at Bangkok Arena. Bangladesh participated & won first 2026 SAFF Women's Futsal Championship. in Thailand among 7 teams.

== Results and fixtures ==
The following is a list of match results in the last 12 months, as well as any future matches that have been scheduled.

Legend

Win Draw Lose Fixture

=== 2018 ===
2 May 2018 2018 AFC Women's Futsal Championship Group B	Bangladesh	1–7	Malaysia	Bangkok, Thailand
17:00 BST (UTC+6)	Parvin 3'	Report	Hanis Farhana 3'; Zurain 4'; Asnidah 18'; Shazreen 19', 40'; Atiqah 20'; Intan 22'	Stadium: Bangkok Arena; Attendance: 50; Referee: Liang Qingyun (China)

4 May 2018 2018 AFC Women's Futsal Championship Group B	Bangladesh	0–7	Vietnam	Bangkok, Thailand
14:30 BST (UTC+6)		Report	Đỗ Thị Nguyên 3', 31', 39'; Võ Thị Thùy Trinh 11', 12'; Nguyễn Thị Thành 21'; Lê Thị Thùy Linh 24'	Stadium: Bangkok Arena; Attendance: 56; Referee: Mari Miyazaki (Japan)

6 May 2018 2018 AFC Women's Futsal Championship Group B	Bangladesh	1–6	Chinese Taipei	Bangkok, Thailand
14:30 BST (UTC+6)	S. Khatun 22'	Report	A. Khatun 1' (o.g.); Lin Ya-hui 3', 29'; Tang Yung-ching 9'; Wang Shu-wen 18'; Kuo Tsu-erh 25'	Stadium: Indoor Stadium Huamark; Attendance: 156; Referee: Kumi Hiruma (Japan)

=== 2026 ===
15 January 2026 2026 SAFF Women's Futsal Championship	Bangladesh	3–1	India	Bangkok, Thailand
13:00 BST (UTC+6)	Sabina 7', 13'; Sumaya 31'	Report	Arya Dhanaji More 37'	Stadium: Hua Mak Indoor Stadium; Attendance: 50; Referee: Benjapol Mucharoensap (Thailand)

17 January 2026 2026 SAFF Women's Futsal Championship	Bangladesh	3–3	Bhutan	Bangkok, Thailand
13:00 BST (UTC+6)	Sumaya Matsushima 7'; Sabina Khatun 35'; Masura Parvin 36'	Report	Deki Lhazom 3'; Sonam Lhamo 27', 30'	Stadium: Nonthaburi Stadium; Attendance: 63; Referee: Vaja Vishal Mahendrabhai (India)

19 January 2026 2026 SAFF Women's Futsal Championship	Bangladesh	3–0	Nepal	Bangkok, Thailand
13:00 BST (UTC+6)	Sabina Khatun 14'; Krishna Rani Sarkar 19'; Lipi Akter 33'	Report		Stadium: Nonthaburi Stadium; Attendance: 50; Referee: Mohammad Javad Ehtesham (Iran)

21 January 2026 2026 SAFF Women's Futsal Championship	Bangladesh	6–3	Sri Lanka	Bangkok, Thailand
13:00 BST (UTC+6)	Sabina Khatun 18', 20'; Sumaya Matsushima 29'; Krishna Rani Sarkar 36', 40'; Masura Parvin 38'	Report		Stadium: Nonthaburi Stadium; Attendance: 43; Referee: Nicholas Backo (Australia)

23 January 2026 2026 SAFF Women's Futsal Championship	Bangladesh	9–1	Pakistan	Bangkok, Thailand
13:00 BST (UTC+6)	Sabina Khatun 8', 16', 34', 40'; Nilufa Yesmin Nila 10'; Nouson Jahan 10', 12'; Krishna Rani Sarkar 16', 32'	Report	Anmool Hira 33'	Stadium: Nonthaburi Stadium; Attendance: 50; Referee: Nicholas Backo (Australia)

25 January 2026 2026 SAFF Women's Futsal Championship	Bangladesh	14–2	Maldives	Bangkok, Thailand
13:00 BST (UTC+6)				Stadium: Indoor Stadium Huamark

== Players ==
The following players are called up for the 2026 SAFF Women's Futsal Championship held on Thailand in January 2026.

No.	Pos.	Player	Date of birth (age)	Club
1	GK	Shejuti Islam Smrity		
2	GK	Shopna Akter Jili		
3	FP	Mehenur Akhter		
4	FP	Sumi Khatun		
5	FP	Masura Parvin	17 October 2001 (age 24)	
6	FP	Marzia Akter	15 October 2002 (age 23)	
7	FP	Sumaya Matsushima	15 February 2001 (age 25)	
8	FP	Lipi Akter		
9	FP	Krishna Rani Sarkar	1 January 2001 (age 25)	
10	FP	Nouson Jahan		
11	FP	Sabina Khatun	25 October 1993 (age 32)	
12	FP	Ratri Moni		
13	FP	Nilufa Yesmin Nila	15 November 2003 (age 22)	
14	GK	Etie Rani		

== Top scorers ==
As of 25 January 2026

Rank	Player	Goals
1	Sabina Khatun	15
2	Krishna Rani Sarkar	7
3	Sumaya Matsushima	4
4	Masura Parvin	4
5	Lipi Akter	4
6	Nouson Jahan	3
7	Nilufa Yesmin Nila	2
8	Mehenur Akhter	1

== Tournament history ==
=== FIFA Futsal Women's World Cup ===
FIFA Futsal Women's World Cup records
Year	Round	Position	GP	W	D	L	GF	GA
(Philippines) 2025	Did not enter							
Total	0/1	0	0	0	0	0	0	0

=== Women's Futsal World Tournament ===
Women's Futsal World Tournament records
Year	Round	Position	GP	W	D	L	GF	GA
(Spain) 2010	Did not enter							
(Brazil) 2011	Did not enter							
(Portugal) 2012	Did not enter							
(Spain) 2013	Did not enter							
(Costa Rica) 2014	Did not enter							
(Guatemala) 2015	Did not enter							
Total	0/6	0	0	0	0	0	0	0

=== AFC Women's Futsal Asian Cup ===
AFC Women's Futsal Asian Cup records
Year	Round	Position	GP	W	D	L	GF	GA
(Malaysia) 2015	Did not enter							
(Thailand) 2018	Group stage	14/15	3	0	0	3	2	20
(Kuwait) 2020	Cancelled due to COVID-19 pandemic							
(China) 2025	Did not enter							
Total	1/3	0	3	0	0	3	2	20

AFC Women's Futsal Asian Cup history
Year	Round	Opponent	Score	Result	Venue
2018	Group stage	Malaysia	1–7	Loss	Bangkok, Thailand
2018	Group stage	Vietnam	0–7	Loss	Bangkok, Thailand
2018	Group stage	Chinese Taipei	1–6	Loss	Bangkok, Thailand

=== AFC Women's Futsal Asian Cup qualification ===
AFC Women's Futsal Asian Cup qualification records
Year	Round	Position	GP	W	D	L	GF	GA
2025	Did not enter							
Total	0/1	0	0	0	0	0	0	0

=== SAFF Women's Futsal Championship ===
SAFF Women's Futsal Championship records
Host/Year	Round	Position	GP	W	D	L	GF	GA
(Thailand) 2026	Round-robin	1st	6	5	1	0	38	10
Total	1/1	1 Title	6	5	1	0	38	10

== Head-to-head records ==
The following table shows Bangladesh's head-to-head records against all opponents.

As of 25 January 2026

Opponent	GP	W	D	L	GF	GA	GD	Win %
Bhutan	1	0	1	0	3	3	+0	0.00
Chinese Taipei	1	0	0	1	1	6	−5	0.00
India	1	1	0	0	3	1	+2	100.00
Malaysia	1	0	0	1	1	7	−6	0.00
Maldives	1	1	0	0	14	2	+12	100.00
Nepal	1	1	0	0	3	0	+3	100.00
Pakistan	1	1	0	0	9	1	+8	100.00
Sri Lanka	1	1	0	0	6	3	+3	100.00
Vietnam	1	0	0	1	0	7	−7	0.00
Total	9	5	1	3	40	30	+10	55.56

== Coaching history ==
As of 25 January 2026

Head coach	From	To	P	W	D	L	GS	GA	%W
(Bangladesh) Amirul Islam	1 April 2018	30 December 2018	3	0	0	3	2	20	0.00
(Iran) Said Khodarahmi	1 October 2025	Present	6	5	1	0	38	10	83.33

== Current coaching staff ==
Position	Name
Team manager	(Bangladesh) Md Imranur Rahman
Coach	(Iran) Said Khodarahmi
Assistant coach	(Iran) Mitra Chinsari
Goalkeeping coach	(Iran) Mahnaz Ashteyanimoghadam
Physio	(Bangladesh) Miss Uraiporn Dankamon
Team staff	(Bangladesh) Taposhi Akter

== See also ==
- Football in Bangladesh
- Sport in Bangladesh
