= Football in the Maldives =

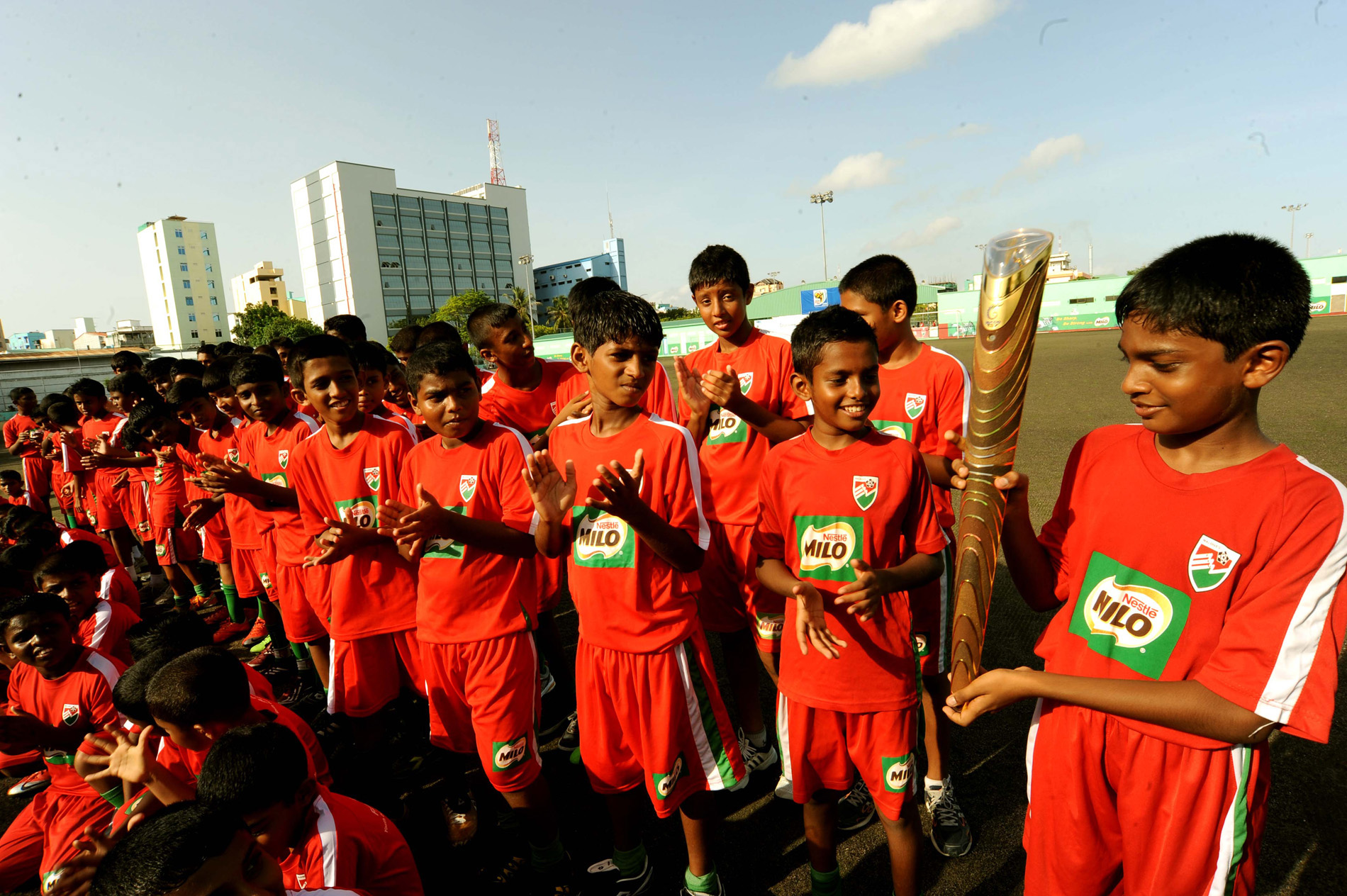
- Footballers of the national youth team of Maldives at the Queen's Baton 2010 in Malé
- Country: Maldives
- Governing body: Football Association of Maldives
- National teams: Maldives men's Maldives women's Maldives U-23 men's Maldives U-20 men's Maldives U-17 men's Maldives futsal men's Maldives futsal women's
- Nickname: The Red Snappers

Club competitions
- List: Leagues: Men's; Dhivehi Premier League (1st Tier); FAM Regional Leagues (2nd Tier); Atoll Championship (3rd Tier); Women's; FAM Women's League (1st Tier); Cups: FA Cup; President's Cup; Charity Shield; Cup Winners' Cup

International competitions
- AFC Challenge League; AFC Women's Champions League; FIFA World Cup; FIFA Women's World Cup; AFC Asian Cup; AFC Women's Asian Cup; Diamond Jubilee Football Tournament

Football is a major organised sport in the Maldives, with the Football Association of Maldives (FAM) serving as the national governing body. FAM is affiliated with the Asian Football Confederation (AFC) and is responsible for the organisation and development of football in the country. The Maldives men's national team competes in international tournaments organised by FIFA, the AFC and the South Asian Football Federation (SAFF). Its major achievements include winning the SAFF Championship in 2008 and 2018, as well as finishing third in the 2014 AFC Challenge Cup, which the Maldives hosted.

== History ==
The Maldives began participating in international football at the 1979 Indian Ocean Island Games in Réunion. The national team played Seychelles on 27 August 1979, losing 9–0, according to the team's historical match records. The development of organised football subsequently expanded through national and regional competitions.

The Maldives gained recognition in South Asian football after winning the SAFF Championship in 2008, defeating India 1–0 in the final to secure its first title. In 2014, the country hosted the AFC Challenge Cup, an international tournament for AFC member countries that were categorised as "emerging countries" in the "Vision Asia" programme. The Maldives finished third after defeating Afghanistan in a penalty shootout following a 1–1 draw, marking one of the national team's most notable achievements in an Asian competition.

In 2018, the Maldives won its second SAFF Championship, again defeating India in the final. The victory established the country as one of the successful teams in the history of the regional tournament.

== Administration ==
The Football Association of Maldives (FAM) is the national governing body for association football, futsal and beach soccer in the Maldives. Founded in 1982, it became affiliated with the Asian Football Confederation (AFC) in 1984 and FIFA in 1986, establishing its formal role within international football governance. FAM's statutes set out its objectives, including promoting and regulating football throughout the country, organising national competitions, enforcing regulations, and supervising football, futsal.

FAM represents Maldivian football internationally and oversees the development of national teams, domestic competitions and club football. Its Executive Committee is responsible for strategic oversight, policy and supervision of competitions, while the association's Congress serves as its supreme decision-making body. The association organises the Dhivehi Premier League (DDPL), the highest level of professional football in the Maldives, in partnership with title sponsor Dhiraagu. Information about the league, including fixtures and standings, is published through the leagues official website.

== Football stadiums in the Maldives ==
Stadium	City	Capacity	Tenants	Image
National Football Stadium	Malé	11,850	National teams, various clubs	

== See also ==
- Lists of stadiums
