= SAFF Women's Futsal Championship =

- Founded: 5 October 2025
- Region: South Asia (SAFF)
- Teams: 7
- Related competitions: SAFF Futsal Championship
- Current champions: Bangladesh (1st title)
- Most championships: Bangladesh (1 title)
- Website: saffederation.org
- 2026 SAFF Women's Futsal Championship

The SAFF Women's Futsal Championship is a futsal competition for the women's national teams of South Asia, organised by the South Asian Football Federation (SAFF). It will be the first futsal tournament held specifically for South Asian nations, with the inaugural edition expected to take place in January 2026.

== History ==
The creation of a SAFF Women's Futsal Championship was first confirmed by SAFF officials in May 2025, with all member associations notified of the plan. The competition is intended to provide greater exposure for South Asian women's futsal teams, who until now have only competed in continental tournaments under the AFC.

Prior to this initiative, SAFF members participated sporadically in AFC futsal competitions, often with limited success.

== Results ==
Edit.	Year	Hosts	Final			Third place playoff			No. of teams
Edit.	Year	Hosts	Champions	Score	Runners-up	Third place	Score	Fourth place	No. of teams
1	2026	Thailand	Bangladesh	RR	India	Bhutan	RR	Nepal	7

== Overall team records ==
As of 2026 SAFF Women's Futsal Championship

Rank	Team	Part	Pld	W	D	L	GF	GA	Dif	Pts
1	Bangladesh	1	6	5	1	0	38	10	+28	16
2	India	1	6	4	0	2	31	12	+19	12
3	Bhutan	1	6	3	2	1	18	13	+5	11
4	Nepal	1	6	3	1	2	18	17	+1	10
5	Pakistan	1	6	2	1	3	12	23	−11	7
6	Sri Lanka	1	6	1	1	4	17	27	−10	4
7	Maldives	1	6	0	0	6	12	44	−32	0

== Participating nations ==
Legend

- 1st – Champions
- 2nd – Runners-up
- 3rd – Third place
- 4th – Fourth place
- – = Did not participate
- LS = League stage
- – Hosts

Team	(Thailand) 2026
Bangladesh	1st
Bhutan	3rd
India	2nd
Maldives	7th
Nepal	4th
Pakistan	5th
Sri Lanka	6th

== Awards ==
Tournament	Most Valuable Player	Top scorer(s)	Total Tournaments Goals	Best Goalkeeper	Fair play award
2026	(Bangladesh) Sabina Khatun (14 goals)	(Bangladesh) Sabina Khatun (14 goals)	146	(Bangladesh) Shopna Akter Jili	Nepal

== See also ==
- SAFF Futsal Championship
- AFC Women's Futsal Asian Cup
- ASEAN Women's Futsal Championship
- CAFA Women's Futsal Championship
- WAFF Women's Futsal Championship
