= Fatemeh Sharif =

Iranian futsal player and coach

Personal information
- Full name: Fatemeh Sharif
- Date of birth: 14 September 1986 (age 40)
- Place of birth: Gonabad, Iran
- Height: 1.77 m (5 ft 10 in)
- Position: Pivot

Team information
- Current team: Pakistan (Head coach)

Senior career*
Years	Team	Apps	(Gls)
2008–2009	Saipa Tehran		
2009–2010	Vahdat Khuzestan		
2010–2011	Fadak Yasuj		
2011–2012	Foolad Mahan Isfahan		
2012–2013	Matin Varamin		(62)
2013–2014	Palayesh Naft Abadan		
2014–2015	Sepidrood Rasht		
2015–2016	Taavoni Ahrar Rasht		
2016–2017	Sepidrood Rasht		
2017–2018	Meshki Poushan Mashhad		
2018–2019	Namino Isfahan		

International career^{‡}
2006–2014	Iran		

Managerial career
- 2016–2017: Pirouzi Kamyaran
- 2017–2018: Meshki Poushan Mashhad (Player-coach)
- 2018–2019: Namino Isfahan (Player-coach)
- 2019–?: Iran (assistant)
- 2025-: Pakistan (Head Coach)
- * Club domestic league appearances and goals as of 30 April 2020 ‡ National team caps and goals as of 30 April 2020

Fatemeh Sharif (Persian: فاطمه شریف; born 14 September 1986) is an Iranian futsal player and coach. She is the head coach of Pakistan women's national futsal team.

== Honours ==
=== National team ===
- Head coach of U-17 national futsal team

Winning the championship title at the 2025 Asian Youth Olympic Games in Bahrain.

- Ranked among the top 10 Women’s Futsal club Coaches in the world in 2024 by Futsal Planet
- Coach of the national futsal team (2020)
- Coach of the national women's youth futsal team (2015–2018)
- (Third place in the women's national futsal team at the 2014 Victoria D-Russia tournament
- Third place with the women's national futsal team in the 2013 Victory D-Russia tournament
- Winning the championship with the women's national futsal team in the West Asia-Jordan 2007 tournament
