= SAFF Futsal Championship =

Futsal competition for South Asian nations

- Founded: 2026
- Region: South Asia (SAFF)
- Teams: 7
- Related competitions: SAFF Women's Futsal Championship
- Current champions: Maldives (1st title)
- Most championships: Maldives (1 title)
- Website: saffederation.org
- 2026 SAFF Futsal Championship

The SAFF Futsal Championship is a futsal competition for national teams of South Asia, organised by the South Asian Football Federation (SAFF). It is the first futsal tournament held specifically for South Asian nations, with the inaugural edition in January 2026.

== History ==
The creation of a futsal championship was first confirmed by SAFF officials in May 2025, with all member associations notified of the plan. The competition is intended to provide greater exposure for South Asian futsal teams, who until now have only competed in continental tournaments under the AFC.

Prior to this initiative, SAFF members participated sporadically in AFC futsal competitions, often with limited success.

== Results ==
| Ed. | Year | Hosts | Final | | | Third place playoff | | | No. of teams |
| Ed. | Year | Hosts | Champions | Score | Runners-up | Third place | Score | Fourth place | No. of teams |
| 1 | 2026 | Thailand | Maldives | RR | India | Nepal | RR | Pakistan | 7 |

== Overall team records ==
As of 2026 SAFF Futsal Championship

| Rank | Team | Part | Pld | W | D | L | GF | GA | Dif | Pts |
|---|---|---|---|---|---|---|---|---|---|---|
| 1 | Maldives | 1 | 6 | 6 | 0 | 0 | 28 | 6 | +22 | 18 |
| 2 | India | 1 | 6 | 3 | 2 | 1 | 26 | 17 | +9 | 11 |
| 3 | Nepal | 1 | 6 | 3 | 2 | 1 | 18 | 12 | +6 | 11 |
| 4 | Pakistan | 1 | 6 | 3 | 1 | 2 | 20 | 20 | 0 | 10 |
| 5 | Bangladesh | 1 | 6 | 2 | 1 | 3 | 16 | 21 | −5 | 7 |
| 6 | Sri Lanka | 1 | 6 | 0 | 1 | 5 | 10 | 24 | −14 | 1 |
| 7 | Bhutan | 1 | 6 | 0 | 1 | 5 | 11 | 29 | −18 | 1 |

== Participating nations ==
Legend

- 1st – Champions
- 2nd – Runners-up
- 3rd – Third place
- 4th – Fourth place
- – = Did not participate
- LS = League stage
- – Hosts

| Team | (Thailand) 2026 |
|---|---|
| Bangladesh | 5th |
| Bhutan | 7th |
| India | 2nd |
| Maldives | 1st |
| Nepal | 3rd |
| Pakistan | 4th |
| Sri Lanka | 6th |

== Awards ==
| Tournament | Most Valuable Player | Top scorer(s) | Total Tournaments Goals | Best Goalkeeper | Fair play award |
|---|---|---|---|---|---|
| 2026 | (Maldives) Mohamed Imran | (Maldives) Mohamed Imran (9 goals) | 129 | (Maldives) Zaidhaan Ahmed | India |

== See also ==
- SAFF Women's Futsal Championship
- AFC Futsal Asian Cup
- ASEAN Futsal Championship
- CAFA Futsal Cup
- WAFF Futsal Championship
