= Nilufa Yesmin Nila =

Bangladeshi footballer (born 2003)

Personal information
- Date of birth: 15 November 2003 (age 22)
- Place of birth: Kushtia, Bangladesh
- Position: Defender

Team information
- Current team: Paro

Senior career*
Years	Team	Apps	(Gls)
2025	Paro		
2026–	IM 10 (futsal)	3	(2)

International career^{‡}
2021–	Bangladesh	18	(0)
2025–	Bangladesh futsal	6	(2)
- * Club domestic league appearances and goals as of 19 June 2026 ‡ National team caps and goals as of 25 May 2026

Nilufa Yesmin Nila (born 15 November 2003) is a Bangladeshi professional footballer who plays as a defender.

== Early life ==
Nila was born on 15 November 2003 in Kushtia, Bangladesh. The daughter of Basiran, she has a younger sister. Growing up, she attended Chand Sultana Girls High School.

Following her stint there, she attended Amla Government College. Subsequently, she attended Jashore University of Science and Technology, located in Jashore.

== Club career ==
In 2025, Nila signed for Bhutanese side Paro.

In 2026, she joined IM10 for the 2025–26 Women's Futsal League Bangladesh, which was the first edition of the league.

== International career ==
Nila is a Bangladesh international. During September 2022, she played for the Bangladesh women's national football team at the 2022 SAFF Women's Championship, helping them win the competition.
