= Masura Parvin =

Bangladeshi footballer

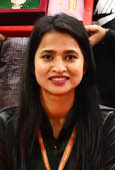

Personal information
- Full name: Masura Parvin
- Date of birth: October 17, 2001 (age 25)
- Place of birth: Satkhira, Khulna, Bangladesh
- Height: 1.68 m (5 ft 6 in)
- Position: Centre-back

Senior career*
Years	Team	Apps	(Gls)
2020–2023	Bashundhara Kings	25	(2)
2023–2024	Nasrin	8	(3)
2025	Transport United	6	(4)
2026	IM 10 (futsal)		
2026	Paro WFC	4	(1)

International career^{‡}
2014–2017	Bangladesh U-16	9	(0)
2018–2019	Bangladesh U-19	8	(1)
2014–	Bangladesh	44	(3)
2026–	Bangladesh futsal	9	(4)
Medal record
Women's football
Representing Bangladesh
SAFF Women's Championship
Winner	2022 Nepal
Winner	2024 Nepal
Winner	2026 Thailand
Runner-up	2016 India
South Asian Games
Bronze medal – third place	2016 India
SAFF U-20 Women's Championship
Winner	2018 Bhutan
Bangamata U-19 Women's International Gold Cup
Winner	2019 Bangladesh
- * Club domestic league appearances and goals as of 10 June 2026 ‡ National team caps and goals as of 25 May 2026

Masura Parvin (Bengali: মাসুরা পারভিন; born 17 October 2001) is a Bangladeshi women's professional footballer who plays as a centre-back for the Bangladesh national team.

Masura has previously played for the Bangladesh women's national under-16 football team. She played four matches at 2017 AFC U-16 Women's Championship qualification in Group C held in Dhaka. Moreover, she has played for the Bangladesh women's national futsal team.

== Early years ==
Masura was born on 17 October 2001 in Satkhira district.

== Club career ==
=== Bashundhara Kings ===
Parvin joined Bashundhara Kings ahead of the 2019–20 Bangladesh Women's Football League. She was deployed as a centre-back in the defensive line. In the season, her club that won all 12 matches and scored 119 goals while conceding three.

She subsequently won a second consecutive league title with Bashundhara Kings in the 2020–21 season.

=== Nasrin ===
After Bashundhara Kings withdrew from the domestic women's league, Parvin joined Nasrin for the 2023–24 Bangladesh Women's Football League, alongside several members of the Bangladesh national team. Nasrin went on to win the title.

=== Transport United ===
In March 2025, Bhutanese club Transport United renewed its interest in signing Parvin after previously approaching her several months earlier, with which she agreed. She travelled to Bhutan in April 2025 to join Transport United for the 2025 Bhutan Women's National League, alongside teammate Rupna Chakma.

=== IM10 ===
Masura joined IM10 for the 2025–26 Women's Futsal League Bangladesh, which was the first edition of the league. The club won title by winning all the matches.

=== Paro ===
She joined Paro in 2026.

== International career ==
Masura was selected to the Bangladesh girls' U-17 team for the 2017 AFC U-16 Women's Championship qualification – Group C matches. She made her debut at the tournament during a match against Iran on 27 August 2016. After winning the group, Bangladesh qualified for the 2017 AFC U-16 Women's Championship in Thailand in September 2017.

== International goals ==
Scores and result list Bangladesh's goal tally first.

No.	Date	Venue	Opponent	Score	Result	Competition
1	7 September 2022	Dasharath Rangasala, Kathmandu, Nepal	Maldives	2–0	3–0	2022 SAFF Women's Championship
2	16 September 2022	Dasharath Rangasala, Kathmandu, Nepal	Bhutan	6–0	8–0	2022 SAFF Women's Championship
3	25 September 2023	Wenzhou Olympic Sports Center Stadium, Wenzhou, China	Vietnam	1–6	1–6	2022 Asian Games

== Honours ==
=== Club ===
Bashundhara Kings Women

- Bangladesh Women's Football League
  - Winners (2): 2019–20, 2020–21

=== International ===
- SAFF Women's Championship

Champion : 2022, 2024
Runner-up : 2016

- South Asian Games

Bronze : 2016

- SAFF U-20 Women's Championship

Champion (1): 2018

- Bangamata U-19 Women's International Gold Cup

Champion trophy shared (1): 2019
