= Krishna Rani Sarkar =

Bangladeshi footballer

Personal information
- Date of birth: January 1, 2001 (age 25)
- Place of birth: North Pathalia, Gopalpur, Tangail, Bangladesh
- Position: Forward

Team information
- Current team: Transport United

Youth career
- 2011–13: Suti V. M. Pilot Model High School

Senior career*
Years	Team	Apps	(Gls)
2018	Sethu	6	(0)
2020–2023	Bashundhara Kings	25	(50)
2023–2024	Nasrin	8	(3)
2025	Transport United	7	(22)
2026–	IM 10 (futsal)	3	(10)

International career^{‡}
2013–2015	Bangladesh U-14	8	(4)
2014–2017	Bangladesh U-16	10	(10)
2018–2020	Bangladesh U-19	9	(6)
2014–	Bangladesh	33	(11)
2026–	Bangladesh futsal	9	(7)
Medal record
Women's football
Representing Bangladesh
SAFF Women's Championship
Winner	2022 Nepal
Winner	2026 Thailand
Runner-up	2016 India
South Asian Games
Bronze medal – third place	2016 India
SAFF U-20 Women's Championship
Winner	2018 Bhutan
Bangamata U-19 Women's International Gold Cup
Winner	2019 Bangladesh
AFC U-14 Girls' Regional C'ship – South and Central
Winner	2015 Bangladesh	Bangladesh U14
- * Club domestic league appearances and goals as of 19 June 2026 ‡ National team caps and goals as of 26 May 2026

Krishna Rani Sarkar (Bengali: কৃষ্ণা রানী সরকার; born 1 January 2001) is a Bangladeshi professional footballer who plays as a forward for the Bangladesh women's national football team. She has also played for the Bangladesh women's national futsal team.

== Club career ==
=== Transport United ===
In 2025, Krishna joined Bhutan Women's National League club Transport United.

=== IM10 ===
Krishna joined IM10 for the 2025–26 Women's Futsal League Bangladesh, which was the first edition of the league.

== International career ==
Krishna was selected to the Bangladesh women's U-17 team for the 2015 AFC U-16 Women's Championship qualification – Group B matches in 2014. She played four matches and scored one goal in that tournament. She was also an integral member of the team that won the AFC U-14 Girls' Regional Championship – South and Central in 2015.

She was named as captain for the 2017 AFC U-16 Women's Championship qualification – Group C matches. She played tremendously in the tournament, scoring 8 goals in 5 matches. Being group C champion, Bangladesh qualified for the 2017 AFC U-16 Women's Championship.

In 2026, she contributed to Bangladesh winning the title in 2026 SAFF Women's Futsal Championship, with 7 goals.

== International goals ==
Scores and results list Bangladesh's goal tally first.

No.	Date	Venue	Opponent	Score	Result	Competition
1	13 November 2014	Jinnah Sports Stadium, Islamabad, Pakistan	Afghanistan	2–1	6–1	2014 SAFF Women's Championship
2	13 November 2014	Jinnah Sports Stadium, Islamabad, Pakistan	Afghanistan	3–1	6–1	2014 SAFF Women's Championship
3	13 November 2014	Jinnah Sports Stadium, Islamabad, Pakistan	Afghanistan	5–1	6–1	2014 SAFF Women's Championship
4	7 February 2016	Jawaharlal Nehru Stadium, Shillong, India	Sri Lanka	1–0	2–1	2016 South Asian Games
5	7 February 2016	Jawaharlal Nehru Stadium, Shillong, India	Sri Lanka	2–1	2–1	2016 South Asian Games
6	11 November 2018	Thuwunna Stadium, Yangon, Myanmar	India	1–7	1–7	2020 AFC Women's Olympic Qualifying Tournament
7	23 June 2022	BSSS Mostafa Kamal Stadium, Dhaka, Bangladesh	Malaysia	6–0	6–0	Friendly Match
8	13 September 2022	Dasharath Stadium, Kathmandu, Nepal	India	2–0	3–0	2022 SAFF Women's Championship
9	16 September 2022	Dasharath Stadium, Kathmandu, Nepal	Bhutan	3–0	8–0	2022 SAFF Women's Championship
10	19 September 2022	Dashrath Stadium, Kathmandu, Nepal	Nepal	2–0	3–1	2022 SAFF Women's Championship
11	19 September 2022	Dashrath Stadium, Kathmandu, Nepal	Nepal	3–1	3–1	2022 SAFF Women's Championship

== Honours ==
Bashundhara Kings Women

- Bangladesh Women's Football League: 2019–20, 2020–21

Bangladesh

- SAFF Women's Championship: 2022; runner-up: 2016
- South Asian Games bronze medal: 2016

Bangladesh U-19

- SAFF U-18 Women's Championship: 2018
- Bangamata U-19 Women's International Gold Cup: 2019

Bangladesh U-14

- AFC U-14 Girls' Regional C'ship – South and Central: 2015

== Education ==
As of 2022, she was an undergraduate student at American International University-Bangladesh.
