= Sumaya Matsushima =

Bangladeshi footballer (born 15 February 2001 in Japan)

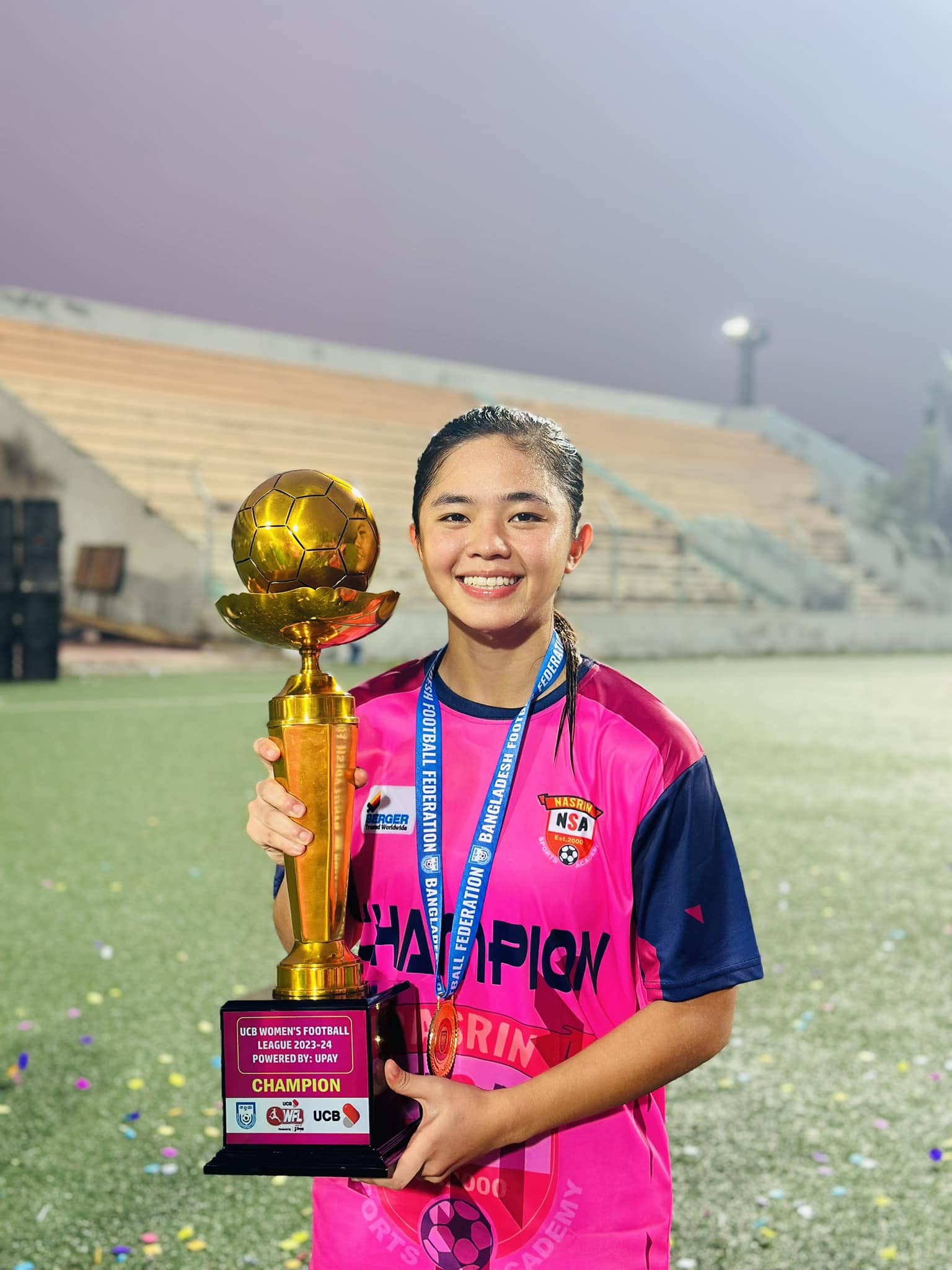
- Sumaya with Nasrin SC

Personal information
- Birth name: Matsushima Sumaya
- Date of birth: 15 February 2001 (age 25)
- Place of birth: Nagoya, Japan
- Position: Forward

Senior career*
Years	Team	Apps	(Gls)
2020–2023	Bashundhara Kings	11	(8)
2023–2024	Nasrin	8	(11)
2025–2026	Paro	9	(21)
2026–	IM10 (futsal)		

International career^{‡}
2023–	Bangladesh	10	(1)
2026–	Bangladesh futsal	6	(4)
Medal record
Women's football
Representing Bangladesh
SAFF Women's Championship
Winner	2024 Nepal
SAFF Women's Futsal Championship
Winner	2026 Thailand
- * Club domestic league appearances and goals as of 19 June 2026 ‡ National team caps and goals as of 26 January 2026

Sumaya Matsushima (Bengali: সুমাইয়া মাতসুশিমা, Japanese: 松島 スマヤ; born 15 February 2001) is a professional footballer who plays as a forward. Born in Japan, she represents the Bangladesh national team.

She is also considered to be the first professional woman freestyler in Bangladesh. At the age of 2, she moved from Japan to Bangladesh in 2003 and became a permanent resident of Bangladesh, as her father was a Bangladeshi.

== Early life ==
Sumaya was born in Nagoya, Japan. Her mother, Tomomi Matsushima, is Japanese while her father, Masudur Rahman, is Bangladeshi. She moved to Bangladesh at the age of 2. She became a permanent resident in 2008.

Sumaya studied at Sea Breeze International School until 8th grade, and then moved to Don Bosco School and college. In 2018, she formed a football team and participated in the Inter-English Medium School festival. Her team participated in the competition six times and were champions four times in a row. Sumaya was the top goal scorer in the competition.

== Club career ==
She started playing professionally in the Maldives for Dhivehi Sifainge Club.

=== Bashundhara Kings ===
In 2020, she was selected by the Bashundhara Kings to play as a forward.

=== Paro ===
In 2025, she signed with Bhutan Women's National League club Paro.

=== IM10 ===
Sumaya joined IM10 for the 2025–26 Women's Futsal League Bangladesh, which was the first edition of the league.

== International career ==
Sumaya made her national team debut for Bangladesh on 15 July 2023 against Nepal.

In 2026, she contributed to Bangladesh's winning the title in 2026 SAFF Women's Futsal Championship, with 4 goals.

== Honours ==
Bashundhara Kings

- Bangladesh Women's Football League: 2021–22, 2021–22

Bangladesh

- SAFF Women's Championship: 2024
- SAFF Women's Futsal Championship: 2026

== International goals ==
No.	Date	Venue	Opponent	Score	Result	Competition
1	4 December 2023	BSSSMK Stadium, Dhaka, Bangladesh	Singapore	7–0	8–0	Friendly
