= Nonthaburi Province Stadium =

Multi-purpose stadium in Thailand

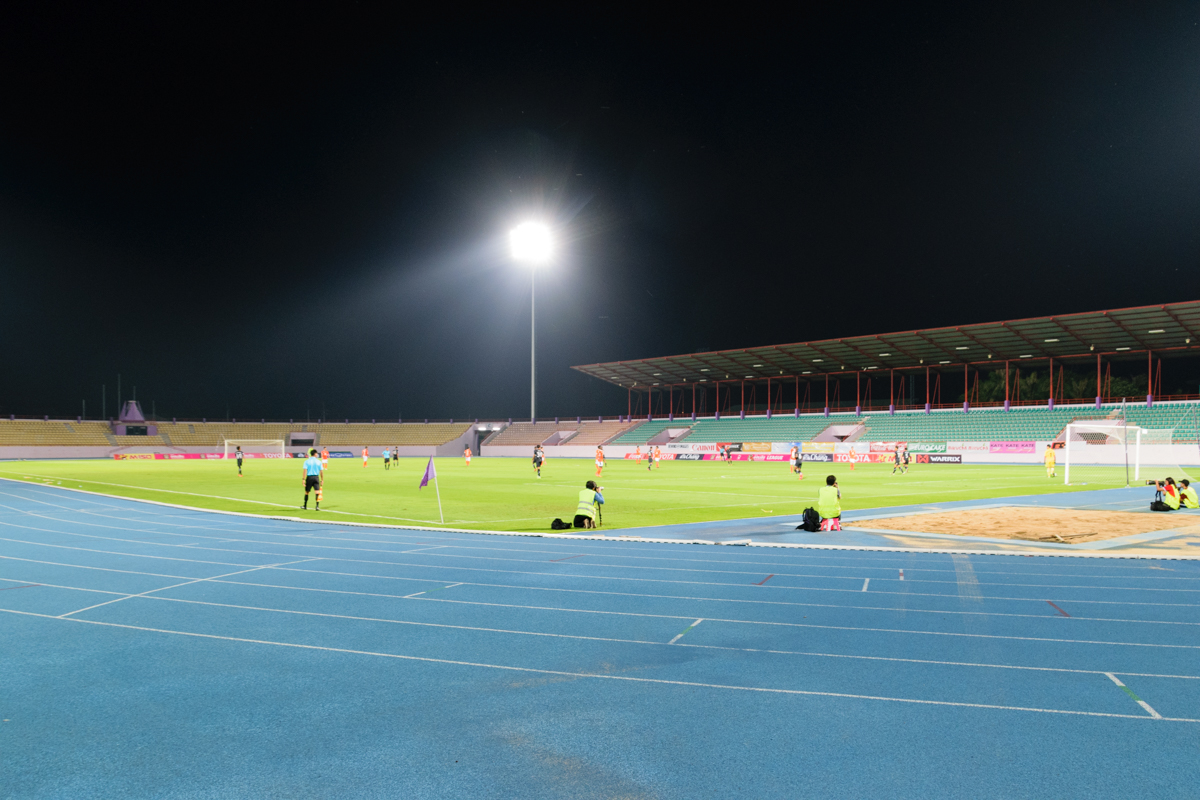
- Interactive map of Nonthaburi Province Stadium
- Location: Nonthaburi, Thailand
- Coordinates: 13°51′03″N 100°26′29″E
- Owner: Nonthaburi Provincial Administration Organization
- Operator: Nonthaburi Provincial Administration Organization
- Capacity: 10,000
- Surface: Grass
- Public transit: MRT Bang Phlu

Construction
- Opened: 2016
- Cost: 1400 million baht

Tenants
- Nonthaburi F.C. Nonthaburi United F.C.

Nonthaburi Province Stadium, Nonthaburi Sports Complex Stadium (Thai: สนามกีฬาจังหวัดนนทบุรี "นนทบุรี สปอร์ต คอมเพล็กซ์") is a multi-purpose stadium in Nonthaburi Province, Thailand. It is currently used mostly for football matches and is the home stadium of Nonthaburi United. The stadium holds 10,000 people.
