= Kayanat Bokhari =

Pakistani footballer (born 2003)

Kayanat Bokhari کائنات بخاری
Personal information
- Full name: Syed Kayanat Zahra Bokhari
- Date of birth: 11 April 2003 (age 23)
- Place of birth: Netherlands
- Position: Midfielder

International career
Years	Team	Apps	(Gls)
- Pakistan

Syeda Kayanat Zahra Bokhari (Urdu: سیدہ کائنات زہرہ بخاری; born 11 April 2003) is a professional footballer who plays as a midfielder. Born in the Netherlands, she represents Pakistan at international level.

== Early life and education ==
Bokhari was born in 2003 in the Netherlands in a Muslim family of Pakistani decent. Her father is a former cricketer. She is a native of The Hague, the Netherlands.

Bokhari obtained a MBO. She studied physical education.

== Career ==
Bokhari is a Pakistan international. She was first called up to the Pakistan women's national football team for friendlies in 2023.
