= Sabina Khatun =

Bangladeshi footballer

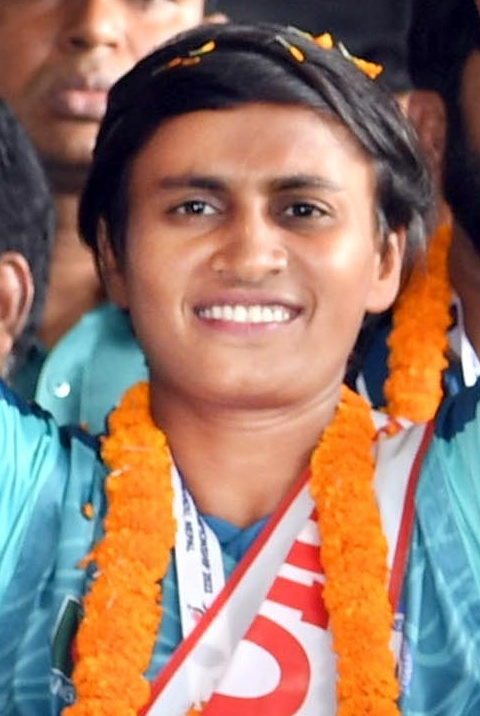
- Sabina in 2022

Personal information
- Date of birth: 25 October 1993 (age 33)
- Place of birth: Satkhira, Khulna, Bangladesh
- Position: Forward

Team information
- Current team: New Radiant

Senior career*
Years	Team	Apps	(Gls)
2009–2012	Satkhira District	21	(70)
2009	Bangladesh VDP	5	(6)
2011	Sheikh Jamal Dhanmondi	5	(25)
2013	Dhaka Mohammedan	4	(28)
2014–2016	Team BJMC	12	(74)
2015	Maldives Defense Force	7	(22)
2018	Sethu	7	(6)
2020–2023	Bashundhara Kings	33	(81)
2021–2022	→ Maldives Army (loan)	5	(21)
2023–2024	Nasrin Sporting Club	8	(17)
2024	Kickstart		
2024	Royal Thimphu College		
2025–2026	Paro WFC	16	(35)
2026	IM 10 (futsal)	3	(10)
2026	Paro WFC	4	(1)
2026	New Radiant	2	(5)

International career^{‡}
2009–2012	Bangladesh U19	5	(1)
2009–2024	Bangladesh	61	(38)
2018–	Bangladesh futsal	9	(15)
Medal record
Women's football
Representing Bangladesh
SAFF Women's Championship
Winner	2026 Thailand
Winner	2024 Nepal
Winner	2022 Nepal
Runner-up	2016 India
South Asian Games
Bronze medal – third place	2010 Bangladesh
Bronze medal – third place	2016 India
- * Club domestic league appearances and goals as of 19 June 2026 ‡ National team caps and goals as of 25 May 2026

Sabina Khatun (Bengali: সাবিনা খাতুন; born 25 October 1993) is a Bangladeshi professional women's footballer who plays as a forward. She is a member of the Bangladesh national football team, and the former captain.

She holds the record of most international goals for Bangladesh, male or female. She is also the all-time top goalscorer in Bangladeshi club football, with over 300 goals. She has also played for the Bangladesh women's national futsal team.

== Early years ==
Khatun was born at Satkhira in Khulna Division. She is the fourth child of Md. Syed Ghazi and Mumtaz Begum. Khatun's relationship with football started back in 2007 when she was in class eight. She was introduced to football by the Satkhira district football coach Akbar. She was called up to the Bangladesh women's national football team after finding success at the school, inter-school and inter-district levels.

She is currently an undergraduate student of Gono Bishwabidyalay.

== Club career ==
=== Royal Thimphu College ===
Sabina was selected for the Royal Thimphu College squad to play in the 2024–25 AFC Women's Champions League.

=== Paro ===
She went to play for Paro WFC in the Bhutan Women's National League in 2025. There she scored 35 goals in 16 matches. In one match she scored 9 goals, contributing to a 28–0 win.

=== IM 10 ===
Sabina joined IM10 for the 2025–26 Women's Futsal League Bangladesh, which was the first edition of the league.

=== Paro ===
She returned to Paro in 2026.

== International career ==
In 2009, Khatun received her first call-up to the Bangladesh national team, which she captained from 2015 to 2024.

In 2026, she led Bangladesh to clinch the title in 2026 SAFF Women's Futsal Championship, with 14 goals in 6 matches.

== Career statistics ==
=== International ===
As of match played 30 October 2024

Appearances and goals by national team and year
National team	Year	Apps	Goals
Bangladesh	2010	8	4
Bangladesh	2011	2	0
Bangladesh	2012	3	0
Bangladesh	2013	3	0
Bangladesh	2014	4	4
Bangladesh	2015	0	0
Bangladesh	2016	6	7
Bangladesh	2017	2	2
Bangladesh	2018	3	0
Bangladesh	2019	3	1
Bangladesh	2020	0	0
Bangladesh	2021	5	4
Bangladesh	2022	7	9
Bangladesh	2023	7	3
Bangladesh	2024	8	4
Total		61	38

Scores and results list Bangladesh's goal tally first, score column indicates score after each Sabina Khatun goal.

List of international goals scored by Sabina Khatun
No.	Date	Venue	Opponent	Score	Result	Competition
1	2 February 2010	Bangabandhu National Stadium, Dhaka, Bangladesh	Pakistan	1–0	1–0	2010 South Asian Games
2	13 December 2010	Cox's Bazar Stadium, Cox's Bazar, Bangladesh	Sri Lanka	2–0	2–0	2010 SAFF Championship
3	15 December 2010	Cox's Bazar Stadium, Cox's Bazar, Bangladesh	Bhutan	5–0	9–0	2010 SAFF Championship
4	15 December 2010	Cox's Bazar Stadium, Cox's Bazar, Bangladesh	Bhutan	8–0	9–0	2010 SAFF Championship
5	13 November 2014	Jinnah Sports Stadium, Islamabad, Pakistan	Afghanistan	4–1	6–1	2014 SAFF Championship
6	15 November 2014	Jinnah Sports Stadium, Islamabad, Pakistan	India	1–2	1–5	2014 SAFF Championship
7	17 November 2014	Jinnah Sports Stadium, Islamabad, Pakistan	Maldives	2–0	3–1	2014 SAFF Championship
8	17 November 2014	Jinnah Sports Stadium, Islamabad, Pakistan	Maldives	3–1	3–1	2014 SAFF Championship
9	9 February 2016	Jawaharlal Nehru Stadium, Shillong, India	Maldives	2–0	2–0	2016 South Asian Games
10	13 February 2016	Jawaharlal Nehru Stadium, Shillong, India	India	1–3	1–5	2016 South Asian Games
11	29 December 2016	Kanchenjunga Stadium, Siliguri, India	Afghanistan	1–0	6–0	2016 SAFF Championship
12	29 December 2016	Kanchenjunga Stadium, Siliguri, India	Afghanistan	2–0	6–0	2016 SAFF Championship
13	29 December 2016	Kanchenjunga Stadium, Siliguri, India	Afghanistan	3–0	6–0	2016 SAFF Championship
14	29 December 2016	Kanchenjunga Stadium, Siliguri, India	Afghanistan	4–0	6–0	2016 SAFF Championship
15	29 December 2016	Kanchenjunga Stadium, Siliguri, India	Afghanistan	5–0	6–0	2016 SAFF Championship
16	2 January 2017	Kanchenjunga Stadium, Siliguri, India	Maldives	3–0	6–0	2016 SAFF Championship
17	2 January 2017	Kanchenjunga Stadium, Siliguri, India	Maldives	6–0	6–0	2016 SAFF Championship
18	14 March 2019	Sahid Rangasala, Biratnagar, Nepal	Bhutan	2–0	2–0	2019 SAFF Championship
19	26 September 2021	JAR Stadium, Tashkent, Uzbekistan	Hong Kong	2–0	5–0	Friendly
20	26 September 2021	JAR Stadium, Tashkent, Uzbekistan	Hong Kong	3–0	5–0	Friendly
21	26 September 2021	JAR Stadium, Tashkent, Uzbekistan	Hong Kong	4–0	5–0	Friendly
22	26 September 2021	JAR Stadium, Tashkent, Uzbekistan	Hong Kong	5–0	5–0	Friendly
23	23 June 2022	BSSSMK Stadium, Dhaka, Bangladesh	Malaysia	2–0	6–0	Friendly
24	7 September 2022	Dasharath Stadium, Kathmandu, Nepal	Maldives	1–0	3–0	2022 SAFF Championship
25	7 September 2022	Dasharath Stadium, Kathmandu, Nepal	Maldives	3–0	3–0	2022 SAFF Championship
26	10 September 2022	Dasharath Stadium, Kathmandu, Nepal	Pakistan	3–0	6–0	2022 SAFF Championship
27	10 September 2022	Dasharath Stadium, Kathmandu, Nepal	Pakistan	4–0	6–0	2022 SAFF Championship
28	10 September 2022	Dasharath Stadium, Kathmandu, Nepal	Pakistan	5–0	6–0	2022 SAFF Championship
29	16 September 2022	Dasharath Stadium, Kathmandu, Nepal	Bhutan	2–0	8–0	2022 SAFF Championship
30	16 September 2022	Dasharath Stadium, Kathmandu, Nepal	Bhutan	5–0	8–0	2022 SAFF Championship
31	16 September 2022	Dasharath Stadium, Kathmandu, Nepal	Bhutan	8–0	8–0	2022 SAFF Championship
32	13 July 2023	BSSSMK Stadium, Dhaka, Bangladesh	Nepal	1–0	1–1	Friendly
33	28 September 2023	Wenzhou Sports Centre, Wenzhou, China	Nepal	1–0	1–1	2022 Asian Games
34	4 December 2023	BSSSMK Stadium, Dhaka, Bangladesh	Singapore	6–0	8–0	Friendly
35	24 July 2024	Changlimithang Stadium, Thimphu, Bhutan	Bhutan	2–1	5–1	Friendly
36	27 July 2024	Changlimithang Stadium, Thimphu, Bhutan	Bhutan	1–2	4–2	Friendly
37	27 October 2024	Dasharath Stadium, Kathmandu, Nepal	Bhutan	3–0	7–1	2024 SAFF Championship
38	27 October 2024	Dasharath Stadium, Kathmandu, Nepal	Bhutan	5–0	7–1	2024 SAFF Championship

== Honours ==
Sheikh Jamal Dhanmondi Club

- Bangladesh Women's Football League: 2011

Bashundhara Kings

- Bangladesh Women's Football League: 2019–20, 2020–21, 2021–22

Bangladesh

- SAFF Women's Championship

Champion : 2022, 2024
Runner-up : 2016

- SAFF Women's Futsal Championship

Champion:2026

- South Asian Games

Bronze (2) : 2010, 2016

Individual

- SAFF Women's Championship Most Valuable Player: 2022
- Anannya Top Ten Awards : 2016
