= Bhutan Football Federation =

Governing body of association football in Bhutan

AFC
- Short name: BFF
- Founded: 1983; 43 years ago
- Headquarters: Babena
- Location: Thimphu
- FIFA affiliation: 2000
- AFC affiliation: 1993
- SAFF affiliation: 2000
- President: Dasho Ugyen Tsechup Dorji
- Website: bhutanfootball.org

The Bhutan Football Federation (Dzongkha: འབྲུག་རྐང་རིལ་ཚོགས་སྡེ) is the governing body of football in Bhutan, controlling the Bhutan national football team, Bhutan women's national football team and the Bhutan national futsal team. It is also responsible for organising the Bhutan Premier League and women's league, alongside Dzongkhag (District) leagues, Women's National League, as well as various youth and recreational tournaments.

== History ==
The Bhutan Football Federation was founded in 1983 as part of the Bhutan Olympic Committee. It has been a member of FIFA since 2000 and the Asian Football Confederation since 1993.

The Bhutan national football team was considered "the worst football team" up until 2015 when it won a World Cup qualifying game against Sri Lanka.

In 2016, the BFF introduced Club Licensing Regulation to bring basic standards to the football economy of the country.

In July 2017, the BFF Disciplinary Committee suspended Druk Pol F.C. for two years after a player disobeyed a referee during a match.

Name	Position	Source
(Bhutan) Dasho Ugyen Tsechup Dorji	President	
(Bhutan) Pema Dorji	Vice-president	
(Bhutan) Ugyen Wangchhuk	General secretary	
(Bhutan) B. T. Dorji	Treasurer	
(Turkey) Mehmet F. Kale	Technical director	
	Team coach (men's)	
(Bhutan) Karma Choden	Team coach (women's)	
(Bhutan) Phuntsho Wangdi	Media/communications manager	
	Futsal coordinator	
(Bhutan) Ugyen Dorji	Referee coordinator	

== Prizes ==
- 2016: AFC aspiring member association of the year
