= 2024 SAFF Women's Championship squads =

Squads for football competition in Nepal

The 2024 SAFF Women's Championship was the 7th edition of the SAFF Women's Championship, organized by the South Asian Football Federation (SAFF). The tournament was held in Kathmandu, Nepal from 17 to 30 October 2024.

The following squads were announced by the respective national federations. Each team was permitted to register a maximum of 23 players for the tournament.

Only players in these squads were eligible to take part in the tournament.

== Group A ==
=== India ===
India's squad was announced on 14 October 2024.

Head coach: (India) Santosh Kashyap

Note: Flags indicate national team as defined under FIFA eligibility rules; some limited exceptions apply. Players may hold more than one non-FIFA nationality.

No.	Pos.	Nation	Player
1	GK	IND	Payal Ramesh Basude
2	DF	IND	Ashalata Devi Loitongbam (Captain)
3	DF	IND	Shilky Devi Hemam
4	DF	IND	Juli Kishan
5	DF	IND	Ranjana Chanu Sorokhaibam
6	DF	IND	Sanju
7	DF	IND	Dalima Chhibber
8	DF	IND	Aruna Bag
9	MF	IND	Anju Tamang
10	MF	IND	Priyangka Devi Naorem
11	MF	IND	Sangita Basfore
12	MF	IND	Karthika Angamuthu

No.	Pos.	Nation	Player
13	FW	IND	Rimpa Haldar
14	FW	IND	Grace Dangmei
15	FW	IND	Soumya Guguloth
16	FW	IND	Karishma Purushottam Shirvoikar
17	FW	IND	Sandhiya Ranganathan
18	FW	IND	Manisha
19	FW	IND	Jyoti
20	FW	IND	Ngangom Bala Devi
21	GK	IND	Elangbam Panthoi Chanu
22	GK	IND	Linthoingambi Devi Maibam
23	DF	IND	Linthoingambi Devi Wangkhem

=== Bangladesh ===
Bangladesh's squad was announced on 15 October 2024.

Head coach: (England) Peter James Butler

Note: Flags indicate national team as defined under FIFA eligibility rules; some limited exceptions apply. Players may hold more than one non-FIFA nationality.

No.	Pos.	Nation	Player
1	GK	BAN	Rupna Chakma
2	GK	BAN	Mst Yearzan
3	GK	BAN	Mile Akter
4	DF	BAN	Masura Parvin
5	DF	BAN	Afeida Khandaker
6	DF	BAN	Sheuli Azim
7	DF	BAN	Shamsunnahar Sr.
8	DF	BAN	Nilufa Yasmin Nila
9	DF	BAN	Kohati Kisku
10	MF	BAN	Monika Chakma
11	MF	BAN	Maria Manda
12	MF	BAN	Sapna Rani

No.	Pos.	Nation	Player
13	MF	BAN	Most Munki Akhter
14	FW	BAN	Airin Khatun
15	FW	BAN	Sumaya Matsushima
16	FW	BAN	Sanjida Akhter
17	FW	BAN	Ritu Porna Chakma
18	FW	BAN	Shaheda Akter Ripa
19	FW	BAN	Sabina Khatun (Captain)
20	FW	BAN	Tohura Khatun
21	FW	BAN	Shamsunnahar Jr.
22	FW	BAN	Srimoti Krishnarani Sarkar
23	FW	BAN	Mst Sagorika

=== Pakistan ===
Pakistan's squad was announced on 8 October 2024.

Head coach: (Pakistan) Adeel Rizki

Note: Flags indicate national team as defined under FIFA eligibility rules; some limited exceptions apply. Players may hold more than one non-FIFA nationality.

No.	Pos.	Nation	Player
1	GK	PAK	Nisha Ashraf
2	DF	PAK	Kayla Siddiqi
3	DF	PAK	Mishal Bhatti
4	DF	PAK	Sarah Khan
5	DF	PAK	Nizalia Siddiqui
6	DF	PAK	Sophia Quershi
7	DF	PAK	Fatima Nasir
8	DF	PAK	Mehreen Khan
9	MF	PAK	Suha Hirani
10	MF	PAK	Maria Khan (Captain)
11	MF	PAK	Sanah Mehdi
12	MF	PAK	Amina Hanif

No.	Pos.	Nation	Player
13	MF	PAK	Rameen Fareed
14	MF	PAK	Kayanat Bokhari
15	FW	PAK	Nadia Khan
16	FW	PAK	Zahmena Malik
17	FW	PAK	Isra Khan
18	FW	PAK	Anmol Hira
19	FW	PAK	Anushay Usman
20	FW	PAK	Alia Sadiq
21	GK	PAK	Mafia Parveen
22	GK	PAK	Rumaysa Khan
23	FW	PAK	Zoya Zeeshan

== Group B ==
=== Nepal ===
Nepal's squad was announced on 14 October 2024.

Head coach: (Nepal) Rajendra Tamang

Note: Flags indicate national team as defined under FIFA eligibility rules; some limited exceptions apply. Players may hold more than one non-FIFA nationality.

No.	Pos.	Nation	Player
1	GK	NEP	Anjila Tumbapo Subba (Captain)
2	DF	NEP	Gita Rana
3	DF	NEP	Amrita Jaisi
4	DF	NEP	Samikchya Ghimire
5	DF	NEP	Nisha Thokar
6	DF	NEP	Puja Rana
7	DF	NEP	Bimala BK
8	DF	NEP	Hira Kumari Bhujel
9	DF	NEP	Sajani Thokar
10	MF	NEP	Renuka Nagarkoti
11	MF	NEP	Preeti Rai
12	MF	NEP	Saru Limbu

No.	Pos.	Nation	Player
13	MF	NEP	Dipa Shahi
14	MF	NEP	Sabita Rana Magar
15	MF	NEP	Anita Basnet
16	MF	NEP	Amisha Karki
17	MF	NEP	Bimala Chaudhary
18	FW	NEP	Rashmi Kumari Ghising
19	FW	NEP	Anita KC
20	FW	NEP	Rekha Poudel
21	FW	NEP	Sabitra Bhandari
22	GK	NEP	Anjana Rana Magar
23	GK	NEP	Usha Nath

=== Sri Lanka ===
Sri Lanka's squad was announced on 13 October 2024.

Head coach: (Sri Lanka) Hassan Roomy

Note: Flags indicate national team as defined under FIFA eligibility rules; some limited exceptions apply. Players may hold more than one non-FIFA nationality.

No.	Pos.	Nation	Player
1	GK	SRI	Francis Chamantha Salomi
2	DF	SRI	Godawalage Maheshika Kumudini
3	DF	SRI	Shashikala Maduwanthi
4	DF	SRI	Sakura Subasinghe
5	DF	SRI	Praveena Perera
6	DF	SRI	Dewamuni Himaya Sachini De Silva
7	MF	SRI	Achala S. Perera
8	MF	SRI	Madumali Somarathna
9	FW	SRI	Poornima Perera
10	FW	SRI	Selvaraj Yuwarani
11	FW	SRI	Ishanka Weerasingha
12	MF	SRI	Thushani Madhushika (Captain)

No.	Pos.	Nation	Player
13	DF	SRI	Navanjana Perera
14	MF	SRI	Paskaran Shanu
15	MF	SRI	Stephanie Dias
16	FW	SRI	Geethangali Madhushani
17	FW	SRI	Ashani Anuradhini
18	FW	SRI	Lochani Sooriyaarachchi
19	MF	SRI	Surenthiran Gowri
20	DF	SRI	Imesha Warnakulasuriya
21	MF	SRI	Sivaneswaran Tharmika
22	GK	SRI	Tharidi Weliwita
23	GK	SRI	Sanduni Sewmini

=== Maldives ===
The Maldives squad was announced on 18 October 2024.

Head coach: (Maldives) Mohamed Nizam

Note: Flags indicate national team as defined under FIFA eligibility rules; some limited exceptions apply. Players may hold more than one non-FIFA nationality.

No.	Pos.	Nation	Player
1	GK	MDV	Aminath Leeza
2	DF	MDV	Zulaikha Habeeb
3	MF	MDV	Safiyya Rafa
4	DF	MDV	Fathimath Sibahath Haneef
5	MF	MDV	Shiyana Ahmed Zuhair
6	MF	MDV	Fathimath Afza
7	DF	MDV	Fathimath Inaasha Adam
8	MF	MDV	Maryam Shafa Binthi Ahmed Ali
9	FW	MDV	Aishath Althaf Mohamed
10	MF	MDV	Mariyam Noora
11	FW	MDV	Fathimath Shahuma
12	MF	MDV	Shahfa Shiuth

No.	Pos.	Nation	Player
13	DF	MDV	Aishath Raveena
14	DF	MDV	Hawwa Haneefa (Captain)
15	DF	MDV	Aminath Zaahiya
16	MF	MDV	Aishath Ameesha Salaam
17	FW	MDV	Mariyam Rifa
18	GK	MDV	Saiga Hussain
19	MF	MDV	Raniya Ibrahim
20	DF	MDV	Maeesha Abdul Hannan
21	FW	MDV	Aminath Fazla
22	DF	MDV	Rishma Abdullah
23	GK	MDV	Fathimath Sausan

=== Bhutan ===
Bhutan's squad was announced on 14 October 2024.

Head coach: (New Zealand) Nicola Demaine

Note: Flags indicate national team as defined under FIFA eligibility rules; some limited exceptions apply. Players may hold more than one non-FIFA nationality.

No.	Pos.	Nation	Player
1	GK	BHU	Sangita Monger
2	DF	BHU	Kelzang Tshering Wangmo
3	DF	BHU	Sangay Dema
4	DF	BHU	Tashi Wangmo
5	DF	BHU	Suk Maya Ghalley
6	MF	BHU	Pema Choden Tshering
7	FW	BHU	Tshering Yangden
8	MF	BHU	Deki Yangdon
9	FW	BHU	Deki Lhazom
10	MF	BHU	Sonam Lhamo
11	FW	BHU	Namgyel Dema
12	DF	BHU	Jamyang Choden

No.	Pos.	Nation	Player
13	FW	BHU	Sunita Rai
14	FW	BHU	Tshering Lhaden
15	MF	BHU	Sonam Choden
16	DF	BHU	Dorji Edon
17	MF	BHU	Tshendu Tshering Pelzom
18	MF	BHU	Tshering Yangchen
19	FW	BHU	Yeshey Bidha
20	DF	BHU	Phuntsho Choden
21	GK	BHU	Karma Yuden
22	GK	BHU	Kinzang Dema
23	DF	BHU	Sangay Wangmo
