= Bhutan women's national football team results =

The Bhutan women's national football team represents Bhutan in international women's football. The team is controlled by the governing body for football in Bhutan, the Bhutan Football Federation, which is currently a member of the Asian Football Federation and the regional body the South Asian Football Federation. Bhutan play their home games at the national stadium, Changlimithang. It is one of the younger national teams in the world having played its first match in 2010.

== 2010s ==
=== 2010 ===
6 December Friendly	Bangladesh	7–0	Bhutan	Dhaka, Bangladesh
		Report

13 December SAFF Championship	India	18–0	Bhutan	Cox's Bazar, Bangladesh

15 December SAFF Championship	Bangladesh	9–0	Bhutan	Cox's Bazar, Bangladesh

17 December SAFF Championship	Bhutan	1–1	Sri Lanka	Cox's Bazar, Bangladesh

=== 2012 ===
7 September SAFF Championship	Bhutan	0–4	Sri Lanka	CR & FC Grounds, Colombo
15:30		Report	Kumari 4'; Kumudumala 21', 57'; Perera 84'

9 September SAFF Championship	Bangladesh	1–0	Bhutan	CR & FC Grounds, Colombo
15:30	Pru 19'	Report

11 September SAFF Championship	Bhutan	0–11	India	CR & FC Grounds, Colombo
8:30		Report	Goon 13'; Devi 23', 30'; Malik 27' (pen.); Magar 38', 49', 65'; Devi 42', 64'; Chanu 63'; Routray 73'

=== 2014 ===
12 November SAFF Championship	Nepal	8–0	Bhutan	Jinnah Sports Stadium, Islamabad
	Sajana Rana 14', 45+1'; Menuka Giri 21'; Anu Lama 36', 40'; Dipa Adhikari 60', 84'; Sabitra Bhandari 88'	Report

14 November SAFF Championship	Sri Lanka	3–0	Bhutan	Jinnah Sports Stadium, Islamabad
	Achala Chitrani 20'; Erandi Kumudumala 40'; Praveena Perea 88'	Report

16 November SAFF Championship	Pakistan	4–1	Bhutan	Jinnah Sports Stadium, Islamabad
	Sehar Zaman 55'; Shahlyla Baloch 68'; Shenaz Roshan 74'; Malika Noor 79' (pen.)	Report	Yangdon 69'

=== 2016 ===
26 December SAFF Championship	Nepal	8−0	Bhutan	Kanchanjangha Stadium, Siliguri

28 December SAFF Championship	Bhutan	0−2	Sri Lanka	Kanchanjangha Stadium, Siliguri

30 December SAFF Championship	Maldives	3−1	Bhutan	Kanchanjangha Stadium, Siliguri

=== 2019 ===
12 March SAFF Championship	Nepal	3−0	Bhutan	Sahid Maidan Rangasala Stadium, Biratnagar

14 March SAFF Championship	Bhutan	0−2	Bangladesh	Sahid Maidan Rangasala Stadium, Biratnagar

23 July Friendly	Bhutan	0–1	Sri Lanka	Thimphu, Bhutan
		Report	Praveena 90+1'	Stadium: Changlimithang Stadium

26 July Friendly	Bhutan	1–0	Sri Lanka	Thimphu, Bhutan
	Yangden 17' (pen.)	Report		Stadium: Changlimithang Stadium

== 2020s ==
=== 2022 ===
6 September 2022 SAFF W GS	Bhutan	0–4	Nepal	Kathmandu, Nepal
17:30		Report	Sabitra 12', 63'; Anita 73', 85'	Stadium: Dashrath Stadium; Attendance: 2210; Referee: Tekcham Ranjita Devi (India)

9 September 2022 SAFF W GS	Sri Lanka	0–5	Bhutan	Kathmandu, Nepal
17:30		Report	Dema 42'; Lhazom 50', 64'; Lhaden 85'; Wangmo 89'	Stadium: Dashrath Stadium; Attendance: 172; Referee: Tekcham Ranjita Devi (India)

16 September 2022 SAFF W SF	Bangladesh	8–0	Bhutan	Kathmandu, Nepal
13:00	Shopna 2'; Sabina 18', 54', 90+3'; Sarkar 30'; Ritu Chakma 35'; Masura 57'; Tohura 87'			Stadium: Dashrath Stadium

24 September 2022 Friendly	Saudi Arabia	3–3	Bhutan	Abha, Saudi Arabia
	Sadagah 15'; Mobarak 75'; Ibrahim 90'	Report	Choden Tshering 5'; Yangdon 40'; Choden 42'	Stadium: Prince Sultan bin Abdul Aziz Stadium; Referee: Pansa Chaisanit (Thailand)

28 September 2022 Friendly	Saudi Arabia	2–4	Bhutan	Abha, Saudi Arabia
	Al-Tamimi 53' (pen.); Mobarak 72'	Report	Choden Tshering 22', 30', 59'; Yangdon 68'	Stadium: Prince Sultan bin Abdul Aziz Stadium

=== 2023 ===
5 April 2023 2024 AFC Olympic Qualifiers Round 1	Uzbekistan	9–0	Bhutan	Tashkent, Uzbekistan
17:00 UTC+5	Khabibullaeva 2', 20', 45+1', 48', 73'; Karachik 30', 42'; Norboeva 51'; Shoyimova 90+1'	Report		Stadium: Milliy Stadium; Attendance: 145; Referee: Azusa Sugino (Japan)

8 April 2023 2024 AFC Olympic Qualifiers Round 1	Bhutan	2–1	Jordan	Tashkent, Uzbekistan
15:00 UTC+5	Dema 64'; Rai 76'	Report	Jbarah 90+2' (pen.)	Stadium: Pakhtakor Stadium; Referee: Atena Lashani (Iran)

11 April 2023 2024 AFC Olympic Qualifiers Round 1	Timor-Leste	1–3	Bhutan	Tashkent, Uzbekistan
15:00 UTC+5	Godelivia 90+5'		N. Dema 43', 67'; J. Choden 75'	Stadium: Pakhtakor Stadium

21 September 2023 Women's Friendly Tournament	Lebanon	3–2	Bhutan	Taif, Saudi Arabia
17:30 UTC+3	Iskandar 30'; Salha 61'; Awad 64'		Lhazom 82', 86'	Stadium: King Fahd Sports City

24 September 2023 Women's Friendly Tournament	Bhutan	0–0	Laos	Taif, Saudi Arabia
17:30 UTC+3				Stadium: King Fahd Sports City

27 September 2023 Women's Friendly Tournament SF	Saudi Arabia	0–1 (a.e.t.)	Bhutan	Taif, Saudi Arabia
20:30 UTC+3			Bidha 112'	Stadium: King Fahd Sports City; Referee: Nodira Mirzoeva (Tajikistan)

30 September 2023 Women's Friendly Tournament F	Lebanon	1–0 (a.e.t.)	Bhutan	Taif, Saudi Arabia
20:30 UTC+3	L. Iskandar 102'			Stadium: King Fahd Sports City; Referee: Nodira Mirzoeva (Tajikistan)

=== 2024 ===
24 July Friendly	Bhutan	1–5	Bangladesh	Thimphu, Bhutan
18:00 UTC+6	Tshering 13'		Sagorika 49', 76', 90+2'; S. Khatun 53'; Chakma 54'	Stadium: Changlimithang Stadium

27 July Friendly	Bhutan	2–4	Bangladesh	Thimphu, Bhutan
	Lhazom 14', 21'		S. Khatun 34'; Sagorika 39'; Dorji Edon 61' (o.g.); Chakma 85'	Stadium: Changlimithang Stadium

18 October 2024 SAFF W GS	Nepal	0–0	Bhutan	Kathmandu, Nepal
17:30 UTC+5:45				Stadium: Dasharath Rangasala

21 October 2024 SAFF W GS	Bhutan	4–1	Sri Lanka	Kathmandu, Nepal
				Stadium: Dashrath Stadium

24 October 2024 SAFF W GS	Maldives	0–13	Bhutan	Kathmandu, Nepal
13:30 UTC+5:45			S. Choden 5'; Tshering 7', 18'; Lhazom 15', 19', 46', 52', 70'; N. Dema 41'; D. Yangden 47'; T. Yangden 65', 80'; Laden 68'	Stadium: Dashrath Stadium; Referee: Jaya Chakma (Bangladesh)

27 October 2024 SAFF W SF	Bangladesh	7–1	Bhutan	Kathmandu, Nepal
13:30 UTC+5:45				Stadium: Dasharath Rangasala

=== 2025 ===
28 May Tri-Nation Cup	Bhutan	0–0	Hong Kong	Thimphu, Bhutan
18:00 UTC+6		Report		Stadium: Changlimithang Stadium

3 June Tri-Nation Cup	Bhutan	1–3	Malaysia	Thimphu, Bhutan
18:00 UTC+6	Bidha 24'	Report	Intan 29'; Ainsyah 45+5'; Farahiyah 90+7'	Stadium: Changlimithang Stadium

7 July 2026 AFC Women's Asian Cup qualification	Bhutan	3–2	Singapore	Amman, Jordan
16:00 UTC+3	Bidha 1'; Edon 67'; Rai 87'	Report	Ganeswaran 10'; Edon 26' (o.g.)	Stadium: King Abdullah II Stadium

10 July 2026 AFC Women's Asian Cup qualification	Bhutan	2–1	Lebanon	Amman, Jordan
: UTC+3	Tshering 45+2', 86'	Report	Khoury 81'	Stadium: King Abdullah II Stadium

13 July 2026 AFC Women's Asian Cup qualification	Iran	7–1	Bhutan	Amman, Jordan
16:00 UTC+3	Alizadeh 3'; Shaban 6', 10'; Zandi 38'; Ghanbari 81'; Zolfi 83'; Tamrian 85'	Report	Lhazom 12'	Stadium: King Abdullah II Stadium

16 July 2026 AFC Women's Asian Cup qualification	Jordan	3–0	Bhutan	Amman, Jordan
: UTC+3	Jbarah 4'; Al-Majali 39' (pen.); Akroush 79'	Report		Stadium: King Abdullah II Stadium

=== 2026 ===
7 April Friendly	Bhutan	7–0	Macau	Thimphu, Bhutan
18:00 UTC+6	Ghalley 7'; Lhazom 15'; Edon 41' (pen.); Ch. Tshering 45+4', 71', 84'; Dema 87'	Report		Stadium: Changlimithang Stadium; Referee: Sharaban Tahura (Bangladesh)

25 May 2026 2026 SAFF GS	Bhutan	0–1	Nepal	Margao, Goa
16:30 (17:00 BTT UTC+6)		Report	Rana 23'	Stadium: Jawaharlal Nehru Stadium; Referee: Tekcham Ranjita (India)

28 May 2026 2026 SAFF GS	Sri Lanka	0–4	Bhutan	Margao, Goa
16:30 (17:00 BTT UTC+6)		Report	Pema 27', 80', 83'; Lhazom 54'	Stadium: Jawaharlal Nehru Stadium; Attendance: 49; Referee: Anjana Rai (Nepal)

28 May 2026 2026 SAFF SF	India	1–0	Bhutan	Margao, Goa
20:00 (20:30 BTT UTC+6)	Nongrum 58'	Report		Stadium: Jawaharlal Nehru Stadium; Attendance: 324; Referee: Y. A. P Minisarani Yapa (Sri Lanka)

== Records ==
=== By venue ===
As at 21 July 2026:

Venue	Played	Won	Drawn	Lost	For	Against	Diff	Win %	Loss %
Home	7	2	1	4	12	13	−1	28.57%	57.14%
Away	13	2	2	9	9	49	−40	15.38%	69.23%
Neutral	25	8	2	15	42	94	−52	32%	60%
Total	45	12	5	28	63	156	−93	25.58%	62.22%

=== By year ===
As at 21 July 2026:

Year	Played	Won	Drawn	Lost	For	Against	Diff	Win %	Loss %
2010	4	0	1	3	1	35	−34	0%	75%
2012	3	0	0	3	0	16	−16	0%	100%
2014	3	0	0	3	1	15	−14	0%	100%
2016	3	0	0	3	1	13	−12	0%	100%
2019	4	1	0	3	1	6	−5	25%	75%
2022	5	2	1	2	12	17	−5	40%	40%
2023	7	3	1	3	8	15	−7	42.85%	42.85%
2024	6	2	1	3	21	17	+4	33.33%	50%
2025	6	2	1	3	7	16	−9	33.33%	50%
2026	4	2	0	2	11	2	+9	50%	50%
Total	45	12	5	28	63	156	−93	25.58%	62.22%

=== By competition ===
As at 21 July 2026:

Competition	Played	Won	Drawn	Lost	For	Against	Diff	Win %	Loss %
Friendly	8	3	1	4	18	22	−4	37.5%	50%
SAFF Women's Championship	24	4	2	18	30	99	−69	16.67%	75%
AFC Women's Asian Cup qualification	4	2	0	2	6	13	−7	50%	50%
AFC Women's Olympic Qualifying Tournament	3	2	0	1	5	11	−6	66.67%	33.33%
2025 Women's Tri-Nation Cup	2	0	1	1	1	3	−2	0%	50%
SAFF Women's International Friendly Tournament	4	1	1	2	3	4	−1	25%	50%
Total	45	12	5	28	63	156	−93	25.58%	62.22%

=== By opponent ===
As at 21 July 2026:

Opponent	Played	Won	Drawn	Lost	For	Against	Diff	Win %	Loss %
Bangladesh	8	0	0	8	4	43	−39	0%	100%
Hong Kong	1	0	1	0	0	0	0	0%	0%
India	3	0	0	3	0	30	−30	0%	100%
Iran	1	0	0	1	1	7	−6	0%	100%
Jordan	2	1	0	1	2	4	−2	50%	50%
Laos	1	0	1	0	0	0	0	0%	0%
Lebanon	3	1	0	2	4	5	−1	33.33%	66.67%
Macau	1	1	0	0	7	0	+7	100%	0%
Malaysia	1	0	0	1	1	3	−2	0%	100%
Maldives	2	1	0	1	14	3	+11	50%	50%
Nepal	6	0	1	5	0	28	−28	0%	83.33%
Pakistan	1	0	0	1	1	4	−3	0%	100%
Saudi Arabia	3	2	1	0	8	5	+3	66.67%	0%
Singapore	1	1	0	0	3	2	+1	100%	0%
Sri Lanka	9	4	1	4	15	12	+3	37.5%	37.5%
Timor-Leste	1	1	0	0	3	1	+2	100%	0%
Uzbekistan	1	0	0	1	0	9	−9	0%	100%
Total	45	12	5	28	63	156	-93	25.58%	62.22%
