= Sheuli Azim =

Bangladeshi footballer (born 2001)

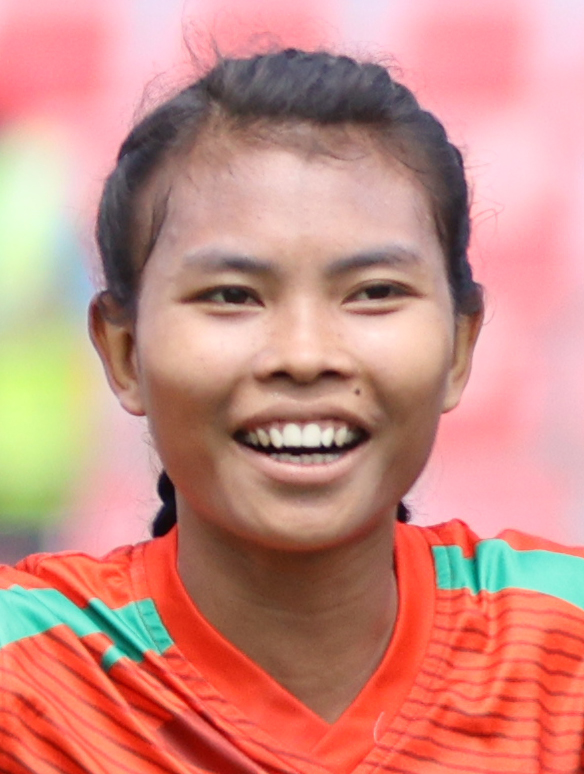

Personal information
- Full name: Sheuli Azim Marak
- Date of birth: 20 December 2001 (age 24)
- Place of birth: Kolsindur, Dhobaura, Mymensingh
- Height: 1.60 m (5 ft 3 in)
- Positions: Right-back; centre-back

Team information
- Current team: Rajshahi Stars
- Number: 2

Youth career
- 2011–2013: Kalsindur Government Primary School
- Kalsindur FA

Senior career*
Years	Team	Apps	(Gls)
2020–2023	Bashundhara Kings	37	(27)
2023–2024	Nasrin	8	(0)
2025	Paro	4	(0)
2025–	Rajshahi Stars	9	(0)

International career^{‡}
2013–2015	Bangladesh U14	7	(0)
2014–2017	Bangladesh U16	8	(0)
2018–2019	Bangladesh U19	10	(2)
2014–	Bangladesh	53	(1)
2018	Bangladesh futsal	3	(0)
Medal record
Women's football
Representing Bangladesh
SAFF Women's Championship
Winner	2024 Nepal
Winner	2022 Nepal
Runner-up	2016 India
South Asian Games
Bronze medal – third place	2016 India
SAFF U-20 Women's Championship
Winner	2018 Bhutan
Bangamata U-19 Women's International Gold Cup
Winner	2019 Bangladesh
- * Club domestic league appearances and goals as of 19 February 2026 ‡ National team caps and goals as of 17 September 2026

Sheuli Azim Marak (Bengali: শিউলী আজিম মারাক IPA: [ʃiuli azim maɾak]; born 20 December 2001) is a Bangladeshi professional footballer who plays as a right-back or a centre-back for Rajshahi Stars and the Bangladesh national team.

She has also played for the Bangladesh women's national futsal team.

== Early years ==
Sheuli Azim (Ajim) was born on 20 December 2001 to a Garo family in Kolsindur, Dhobaura, Mymensingh district.

== Early career ==
Sheuli first played in 2011 Bangamata Sheikh Fazilatunnesa Mujib Gold Cup Football Tournament for Kalsindur Government Primary School.

== Club career ==
=== Paro ===
In 2025, Sheuli Azim joined Bhutan Women's National League club Paro.

=== Rajshahi Stars ===
On 22 December 2025, she joined Rajshahi Stars.

== International career ==
Sheuli Azim was selected to the Bangladesh girls' U-17 team for the 2017 AFC U-16 Women's Championship qualification – Group C matches. She played first time at the tournament in the match against Iran girls' U-17 on 27 August 2016. She capped 5 times for the U-17 nationals. Being group C champion, Bangladesh have qualified for the 2017 AFC U-16 Women's Championship in Thailand in September 2017.

== Career statistics ==
=== International ===
As of match played 5 July 2025
Scores and results list Bangladesh's goal tally first, score column indicates score after each Sheuli Azim goal.

List of international goals scored by Sheuli Azim
No.	Date	Venue	Opponent	Score	Result	Competition
1	27 October 2024	Dasharath Rangasala, Kathmandu, Nepal	Bhutan	7–1	7–1	2024 SAFF Women's Championship

== Honours ==
=== Club ===
Bashundhara Kings

- Bangladesh Women's Football League
  - Winners (2): 2019–20, 2020–21

Rajshahi Stars

- Bangladesh Women's Football League: 2025–26

=== International ===
- SAFF Women's Championship

Winner : 2022, 2024
Runner-up : 2016

- South Asian Games

Bronze : 2016

- SAFF U-20 Women's Championship

Champion (1): 2018

- Bangamata U-19 Women's International Gold Cup

Champion trophy shared (1): 2019

- AFC U-14 Girls' Regional C'ship – South and Central

Bangladesh U-14 Girls'
Champion : 2015
