= Sajid Dar =

Indian former footballer and manager

Sajid Yousuf Dar
Personal information
- Full name: Sajid Yousuf Dar
- Place of birth: Jammu and Kashmir, India

Senior career*
| Years | Team | Apps | (Gls) |
| –2000 | YMCA | | |
| 2000–2002 | Jammu and Kashmir | | |

Managerial career
- 2011–12: India U19 (assistant)
- 2012–2014: Indian U14 and U16
- 2015–2017: Indian Women
- 2016: India Women U19
- * Club domestic league appearances and goals

Sajid Yousuf Dar is an Indian football coach and former football player. He previously served as the Head Coach of the Indian Senior Women’s National Football Team as well as the Indian Youth Teams (Boys). In November 2024, Sajid earned the AFC Pro Licence, the highest coaching certification in Asia. He currently works as a Football Coach at the University of Kashmir and serves as an AIFF/AFC Coach Educator.

As a player, Sajid represented the Jammu and Kashmir side in the Santosh Trophy from 2000 to 2002 and captained JK YMCA during the 1998 Federation Cup.

Widely regarded as one of the leading football coaches in India, he holds the distinction of winning two major titles consecutively: a Gold medal at the South Asian Games and the SAFF Cup. Sajid is the son of renowned international footballer Mohammad Yousuf Dar. Sajid was influenced from an early age by his family's strong football background. His father, Mohammad Yousuf Dar, was a prominent footballer in Jammu and Kashmir, and his cousin, Aslam Parveez Dar, both represented India at the international level. Growing up in this environment played a key role in shaping his passion for the sport and ultimately guided him toward a career in football, both as a player and coach.

== Playing career ==
Born in Jammu and Kashmir, Sajid in his early days started his career at local and school level. He made it to YMCA Football Club which used to be among the best teams in J and K. He went on to play for YMCA in the Federation Cup and under his captaincy YMCA won many prestigious tournaments in the 1990s. He also represented Jammu and Kashmir in the Junior Nationals and Santosh Trophy from 2000 to 2002. Sajid also played for JKSRTC Football Team and Iqbal Sports and was considered as one of the best defenders in North Zone.

== Coaching career ==
Sajid is currently regarded as one of the most promising and talented football coaches in India. He began his coaching career in 2004 after earning a Diploma in Football Coaching from the Netaji Subhas National Institute of Sports (NSNIS), Patiala. Soon after, he was appointed as the Football Coach at the University of Kashmir and later took charge of the Jammu & Kashmir U-21 football team. Following the completion of his AFC 'A' License, he was named Assistant Coach for the preparatory phase of the India U-19 national team. In the early years of his career, Sajid was also involved in scouting activities for the All India Football Federation (AIFF).

In 2012, Sajid was appointed Head Coach of the India U-14 national football team, which participated in the AFC Football Festival in Kathmandu, Nepal, and the SAARC Football Championship in Tokyo, Japan. He later took charge of the India U-16 team that was part of the AIFF Elite Academy in preparation for the 2017 FIFA U-17 World Cup.

In March 2015, Sajid was appointed Head Coach of the India women's national football team ahead of the qualifiers for the 2016 Summer Olympics. His first match in charge was on 13 March 2015, in which India secured a 4–0 win over Sri Lanka. However, a subsequent defeat to Myanmar ended their Olympic qualification campaign.

That same year, Sajid was selected by the Asian Football Confederation (AFC) for its instructors course in Malaysia. He also attended the International Coaching Course (ICC) in Hennef, Germany, conducted by the German Football Association in September 2015.

In 2016, Sajid achieved his first major international success as Head Coach when he led the Indian women’s team to a gold medal at the 2016 South Asian Games, defeating Nepal 4–0 in the final.

In January 2017, under Sajid’s leadership, India clinched their fourth consecutive SAFF Women’s Championship title. He also served as Head Coach of the India U-19 women’s team during the AFC Qualifiers held in Vietnam.

Sajid concluded his tenure as Head Coach of the Indian women’s national team in April 2017, signing off with a 2–0 victory against Hong Kong in Pyongyang, North Korea.

In addition to his coaching roles, Sajid is also an accredited AFC Coach Educator.

== Statistics ==
=== Managerial statistics ===
As of 11 April 2017

| Team | From | To | Record | | | | Win % |
| Team | From | To | G | W | D | L | |
|---|---|---|---|---|---|---|---|
| India Women | 1 March 2015 | April 2017 | 15 | 8 | 3 | 4 | 53.3% |
| Total | | | 15 | 8 | 3 | 4 | 53.3% |

== Honours ==
=== Managerial ===
India Women

- SAFF Women's Championship: 2016
- South Asian Games Gold Medal: 2016
- U-17 Administrator Cup: 2013
- U-19 I-League West Zone Champion: 2013

Individual

- Best Coach of the Year (2014) – Awarded by the Government of Jammu & Kashmir
