= Bhutan women's national football team =

Women's national association football team representing Bhutan

Bhutan
- Nickname: Dragon Ladies
- Association: Bhutan Football Federation
- Confederation: AFC (Asia)
- Sub-confederation: SAFF (South Asia)
- Head coach: Kim Tae-in
- Captain: Pema Choden Tshering
- Top scorer: Deki Lhazom (16)
- Home stadium: Changlimithang Stadium
- FIFA code: BHU
First colours	Second colours

FIFA ranking
- Current: 161 ▲3 (16 June 2026)
- Highest: 113 (March 2017; March 2018)
- Lowest: 178 (March 2023)

First international
- Bangladesh 7–0 Bhutan (Dhaka, Bangladesh; 6 December 2010)

Biggest win
- Maldives 0–13 Bhutan (Kathmandu, Nepal; 24 October 2024)

Biggest defeat
- India 18–0 Bhutan (Cox's Bazar, Bangladesh; 13 December 2010)

SAFF Championship
- Appearances: 8 (first in 2010)
- Best result: Semi-finals (2022, 2024, 2026)

The Bhutan women's national football team represents Bhutan in international women's football. The team is controlled by the governing body for football in Bhutan, the Bhutan Football Federation, which is currently a member of the Asian Football Federation and the regional body the South Asian Football Federation.

Bhutan play their home games at the national stadium, Changlimithang. It is one of the younger national teams in the world having played its first match in 2010.

== History ==
=== Introduction to Bhutanese Football ===
Bhutanese football in general came to the international stage comparatively late in the day with the men's national team only playing their first competitive international match in 1982 and the only junior team to compete internationally, the Under-17s making their debut in 2003.

The women's team did not enter any form of international competition until 2010. Prior to their entry into international football, a formal women's competition was established in Bhutan for the first time, supported by a grant from FIFA and run by the Bhutan Football Federation. Because of the very under-developed state of women's football in Bhutan at this time, club teams did not exist and so the tournament consisted of teams representing individual Dzongkhags. This competition was used not only to increase the popularity of football amongst women in the country, but also to act as means of identifying and coaching players who would form the first ever Bhutan women's national football squad.

=== Competitive debut ===
Their first ever competitive game was a friendly match against Bangladesh in Dhaka on 6 December 2010 as a warm up for their appearance at the inaugural SAFF Women's Championships a week later. Unfortunately, their debut was one to forget as, having travelled to Cox's Bazar where all of the group matches were scheduled to take place, they succumbed 7–0 to their hosts. Their competition proper got off to an even worse start as they lost 18–0 to India, one of the strongest teams in the region. Bangladesh then repeated their performance in the pre-competition friendly running out 9–0 victors and eliminating Bhutan from the competition. The team were able to salvage some pride in their final game, drawing 1–1 with Sri Lanka, which marks their only positive result of any kind as well as their first competitive goal (one of two times they have scored a goal in a competitive match).

Their performance at the SAFF Championships saw them gain 889 ranking points. Although they were at this stage only provisionally ranked in 127th and last place as they had not played the required number of five competitive matches against officially ranked teams, their performance saw them achieve a higher points total than four other provisionally ranked teams: the U.S. Virgin Islands, Liberia, Qatar and Afghanistan. Had they been officially ranked, their points tally would have placed them in 122nd place ahead of ranked nations Tanzania, Belize, Antigua and Barbuda and Botswana.

=== Withdrawal and return to international football ===
The women's team then withdrew from international football for the next two years, re-emerging to play in the 2012 SAFF Women's Championship. Prior to the tournament in Sri Lanka, the team of twenty five, including two referees and physiotherapists, but with the playing squad consisting entirely of students, flew to Bangkok for two weeks training to get accustomed to warmer weather. They entered the tournament provisionally ranked 34th out of 35 in the Asian Football Confederation, with only Afghanistan ranked below them, and unranked on the global listing because they had been inactive for more than eighteen months. At this point, with their points total of 889, they had a higher technical rating than twelve teams who were either unranked due to inactivity or provisionally ranked in last place due to insufficient competition and had more ranking points than five officially ranked teams: Iraq, Mozambique, Malawi, Antigua and Barbuda and Botswana.

The team travelled to Sri Lanka to play their fixtures at the Ceylonese Rugby & Football Club Grounds and were drawn in a group with the same teams as the previous edition of the tournament. Sri Lanka took advantage of their status as hosts in the first match, beating Bhutan 4–0, taking the lead after just four minutes through Nilushika Kumari, with Praveena Perera wrapping up the scoring at the end of the game following two goals either side of half time from Erandi Kumudumala. Bhutan performed better in their next game, a narrow 1–0 loss to Bangladesh, but this eliminated them from the tournament. Their final match against India was very one-sided, though not as great a defeat as last time, India still ran out victors 11–0 sending Bhutan home without a point or a goal.

=== Rankings, performance, and current status ===
Having now played the required five games against already ranked teams, Bhutan received their first official ranking position: 128th, ahead of Antigua and Barbuda and Botswana. Bhutan have not played a competitive match since the 2014 SAFF Championships, but due to movements around them, did climb to a high ranking of 115th in December 2013.

Bhutan took part in the 2014 SAFF Women's Championship in Pakistan, losing all three games, including a 4–1 loss to host Pakistan in which Tshering Yangdon scored just the second official goal in the team's history.

On 24 October 2024, Bhutan trashed Maldives with the score of 13-0,which record their biggest victory ever in the history.

== Team image ==
=== Home stadium ===
The Bhutan women's national football team plays their home matches on the Changlimithang Stadium.

== Results and fixtures ==
The following is a list of match results in the last 12 months, as well as any future matches that have been scheduled.

Legend

Win Draw Lose Fixture

=== 2026 ===
7 April 2026 Friendly	Bhutan	7–0	Macau	Thimphu, Bhutan
18:00 UTC+6	Ghalley 7'; Lhazom 15'; Edon 41' (pen.); Ch. Tshering 45+4', 71', 84'; Dema 87'	Report		Stadium: Changlimithang Stadium; Referee: Sharaban Tahura (Bangladesh)

25 May 2026 2026 SAFF GS	Bhutan	0–1	Nepal	Margao, Goa
16:30 (17:00 BTT UTC+6)		Report	Rana 23'	Stadium: Jawaharlal Nehru Stadium; Referee: Tekcham Ranjita (India)

28 May 2026 2026 SAFF GS	Sri Lanka	0–4	Bhutan	Margao, Goa
16:30 (17:00 BTT UTC+6)		Report	Pema 27', 80', 83'; Lhazom 54'	Stadium: Jawaharlal Nehru Stadium; Attendance: 49; Referee: Anjana Rai (Nepal)

3 June 2026 2026 SAFF SF	India	1–0	Bhutan	Margao, Goa
20:00 (20:30 BTT UTC+6)	Nongrum 58'	Report		Stadium: Jawaharlal Nehru Stadium; Attendance: 324; Referee: Y. A. P Minisarani Yapa (Sri Lanka)

29 November 2026 Friendly	Indonesia	v	Bhutan	Kudus, Indonesia
--:-- UTC+7				Stadium: Wergu Wetan Stadium

== Head-to-head record ==
As of 3 June 2026 after match against India :

Key

Positive balance (more wins than losses)
Neutral balance (as many wins as losses)
Negative balance (more losses than wins)

The following table shows Bhutan' all-time official international record per opponent:

Opponent	Pld	W	D	L	GF	GA	GD	W%	Confederation
Bangladesh	8	0	0	8	4	43	–39	0	AFC
Hong Kong	1	0	1	0	0	0	0	0	AFC
India	3	0	0	3	0	30	–30	0	AFC
Iran	1	0	0	1	1	7	–6	0	AFC
Jordan	2	1	0	1	2	4	–2	50	AFC
Laos	1	0	1	0	0	0	0	0	AFC
Lebanon	3	1	0	2	4	5	–1	33.33	AFC
Macau	1	1	0	0	7	0	+7	100	AFC
Malaysia	1	0	0	1	1	3	–2	0	AFC
Maldives	2	1	0	1	14	3	+11	50	AFC
Nepal	6	0	1	5	0	28	–28	0	AFC
Pakistan	1	0	0	1	1	4	–3	0	AFC
Saudi Arabia	3	2	1	0	8	5	+3	66.67	AFC
Singapore	1	1	0	0	3	2	+1	100	AFC
Sri Lanka	9	4	1	4	15	12	+3	37.5	AFC
Timor-Leste	1	1	0	0	3	1	+2	100	AFC
Uzbekistan	1	0	0	1	0	9	–9	0	AFC
Total	45	12	5	28	63	156	–93	25.58	—

== Coaching staff ==
=== Current coaching staff ===
As of July 2025

Position	Name
Head coach	(South Korea) Kim Tae-in
Assistant coach	(Bhutan) Tanka Maya Ghalley
Goalkeeping coach	(Bhutan) Mon Bhattrai
Physiotherapist	(Bhutan) Chhador Zangmo
Team manager	(Bhutan) Tashi Wangmo
Media officer	(Bhutan) Cheki wangmo

=== Manager history ===
Name	Period	Tournament
(Bhutan) Kota Namgay	2010–2012	2010 SAFF Women's Championship: Eighth Place (Last); 2012 SAFF Women's Championship: Eighth Place (Last)
(Bhutan) Dorji Khandu	2014	2012 SAFF Women's Championship: Seventh Place
(South Korea) Lee Sung-jea	2016–2019	2016 SAFF Women's Championship: Seventh Place (Last); 2019 SAFF Women's Championship: Sixth Place
(Bhutan) Denka Na	2019	
(South Korea) Hong Kyung-suk	2022–2023	2022 SAFF Women's Championship: Semi-finalist
(Bhutan) Karma Choden	2023	2023 SAFF Women's Friendly Tournament: Finalist
(England) Nicola Demaine	2024	2024 SAFF Women's Championship: Semi-finalist
(South Korea) Kim Tae-in	2025–	2026 SAFF Women's Championship: Semi-finalist

== Players ==
=== Current squad ===
- The following players were called up for the 2026 AFC Women's Asian Cup qualification in July 2025.

Caps and goals are updated as of 16 July 2025 after the match against Jordan. (Although without subs vs Jordan)

No.	Pos.	Player	Date of birth (age)	Caps	Goals	Club
1	GK	Sangita Monger	28 June 1999 (age 27)	20	0	(All India Football Federation) Sesa
21	GK	Karma Yuden	2 November 2004 (age 22)	0	0	(Bhutan Football Federation) Transport United FC
22	GK	Kinzang Dema	15 February 2004 (age 22)	3	0	(Bhutan Football Federation) Royal Thimphu College
2	DF	Sonam Choden	28 November 2002 (age 23)	4	0	
3	DF	Kelzang Tshering Wangmo	20 September 2004 (age 22)	8	1	(Bhutan Football Federation)
23	DF	Tashi Wangmo	21 October 2005 (age 21)	5	0	(Bhutan Football Federation) Transport United
5	DF	Suk Maya Ghalley	28 November 1998 (age 27)	26	1	(Bhutan Football Federation) Royal Thimphu College
12	DF	Jamyang Choden	3 April 2001 (age 25)	19	1	(Bhutan Football Federation) Ugyen Academy
16	DF	Dorji Edon	9 October 2001 (age 25)	19	2	(Bhutan Football Federation) Ugyen Academy
18	DF	Tshering Choden	9 September 2004 (age 22)	1	0	(Bhutan Football Federation)
4	MF	Ganga Ghalley	9 February 2005 (age 21)	1	0	(Bhutan Football Federation) Royal Thimphu College
6	MF	Pema Choden Tshering (captain)	5 February 1996 (age 30)	26	9	(Bhutan Football Federation) Transport United
8	MF	Deki Yangdon	27 June 2003 (age 23)	19	1	(Bhutan Football Federation) Royal Thimphu College
10	MF	Sonam Lhamo	29 May 2004 (age 22)	8	0	(Bhutan Football Federation) Royal Thimphu College
15	MF	Sonam Choden	16 May 2002 (age 24)	13	2	(Bhutan Football Federation) Royal Thimphu College
7	FW	Tshering Yangden	16 August 1999 (age 27)	16	2	(Bhutan Football Federation) Ugyen Academy
9	FW	Deki Lhazom	4 January 2004 (age 22)	32	15	(Bhutan Football Federation) Royal Thimphu College
11	FW	Namgyel Dema	13 August 2000 (age 26)	15	6	(Bhutan Football Federation) Royal Thimphu College
13	FW	Sunita Rai	7 August 2001 (age 25)	15	2	(Bhutan Football Federation) Transport United
14	FW	Tshering Lhaden	11 May 2003 (age 23)	11	2	(Bhutan Football Federation) Royal Thimphu College
17	FW	Ugyen Lhamo	28 November 2006 (age 19)	0	0	
19	FW	Yeshey Bidha	27 March 2004 (age 22)	13	3	(Football Association of Indonesia) Persiratu Putri
20	FW	Pema Choeki	9 October 2004 (age 22)	4	0	(Bhutan Football Federation) Royal Thimphu College

=== Recent call-ups ===
- The following players have been called up to a Bhutan squad in the past 12 months.

Pos.	Player	Date of birth (age)	Caps	Goals	Club	Latest call-up

== Records ==
Active players in bold, statistics correct as of 2020.

=== Top goalscorers ===
#	Player	Year(s)	Goals	Caps
**1**	Deki Lhazom	2022–present	16	34

== Competitive record ==
=== FIFA Women's World Cup ===
FIFA Women's World Cup record									Qualification record						
Year	Result	GP	W	D	L	GS	GA	GD	GP	W	D	L	GS	GA	GD
(China) 1991 to (Germany) 2011	Did not exist								Did not exist						
(Canada) 2015 to (Australia) (New Zealand) 2023	Did not enter								Did not enter						
(Brazil) 2027	Did not qualify								Via AFC Women's Asian Cup						
(Costa Rica) (Jamaica) (Mexico) (United States) 2031	To be determined								To be determined						
(United Kingdom) 2035	To be determined								To be determined						
Total	0/10	–	–	–	–	–	–	–	–	–	–	–	–	–	–

=== Olympic Games ===
Summer Olympics record									Qualification record						
Year	Round	Pld	W	D*	L	GF	GA	GD	Pld	W	D*	L	GF	GA	GD
(United States) 1996 to (China) 2008	Did not exist								Did not exist						
(United Kingdom) 2012 to (Japan) 2020	Did not enter								Did not enter						
(France) 2024	Did not qualify								3	2	0	1	5	11	−6
(United States) 2028	Did not qualify								Via AFC Women's Asian Cup						
(Australia) 2032	To be determined								To be determined						
Total	0/9	–	–	–	–	–	–	–	3	2	0	1	5	11	−6

*Denotes draws includes knockout matches decided on penalty kicks.

=== AFC Women's Asian Cup ===
AFC Women's Asian Cup record									Qualification record						
Hosts / Year	Result	GP	W	D*	L	GS	GA	GD	GP	W	D*	L	GS	GA	GD
(Hong Kong) 1975 to (China) 2010	Did not exist								Did not exist						
(Vietnam) 2014 to (India) 2022	Did not enter								Did not enter						
(Australia) 2026	Did not qualify								4	2	0	2	6	13	−7
(Uzbekistan) 2029	To be determined								To be determined						
Total	0/21	–	–	–	–	–	–	–	4	2	0	2	6	13	−7

*Denotes draws includes knockout matches decided on penalty kicks.

=== SAFF Women's Championship ===
SAFF Women's Championship record
Hosts / Year	Result	GP	W	D*	L	GS	GA	GD
(Bangladesh) 2010	Group stage	3	0	1	2	1	28	−27
(Sri Lanka) 2012	Group stage	3	0	0	3	0	16	−16
(Pakistan) 2014	Group stage	3	0	0	3	1	15	−14
(India) 2016	Group stage	3	0	0	3	1	13	−12
(Nepal) 2019	Group stage	2	0	0	2	0	5	−5
(Nepal) 2022	Semi-finals	3	1	0	2	5	12	−7
(Nepal) 2024	Semi-finals	4	2	1	1	18	8	+10
(India) 2026	Semi-finals	3	1	0	2	4	2	+2
Total	8/8	24	4	2	18	30	99	−69

SAFF Women's Championship history
Year	Round	Score	Result
2010	Group stage	India **18–0** Bhutan	Loss
2010	Group stage	Bangladesh **9–0** Bhutan	Loss
2010	Group stage	Bhutan **1–1** Sri Lanka	Draw
2012	Group stage	Bhutan **0–4** Sri Lanka	Loss
2012	Group stage	Bangladesh **1–0** Bhutan	Loss
2012	Group stage	Bhutan **0–11** India	Loss
2014	Group stage	Nepal **8–0** Bhutan	Loss
2014	Group stage	Sri Lanka **3–0** Bhutan	Loss
2014	Group stage	Pakistan **4–1** Bhutan	Loss
2016	Group stage	Nepal **8–0** Bhutan	Loss
2016	Group stage	Bhutan **0–2** Sri Lanka	Loss
2016	Group stage	Maldives **3–1** Bhutan	Loss
2019
2019	Group stage	Nepal **3–0** Bhutan	Loss
2019	Group stage	Bhutan **0–2** Bangladesh	Loss
2022
2022	Group stage	Bhutan **0–4** Nepal	Loss
2022	Group stage	Sri Lanka **0–5** Bhutan	Win
2022	Semi-finals	Bangladesh **8–0** Bhutan	Loss
2024
2024	Group stage	Nepal **0–0** Bhutan	Draw
2024	Group stage	Bhutan **4–1** Sri Lanka	Win
2024	Group stage	Maldives **0–13** Bhutan	Win
2024	Semi-finals	Bangladesh **7–1** Bhutan	Loss
2026
2026	Group stage	Bhutan **0–1** Nepal	Loss
2026	Group stage	Sri Lanka **0–4** Bhutan	Win
2026	Semi-finals	India **1–0** Bhutan	Loss

*Denotes draws includes knockout matches decided on penalty kicks. Red border indicates that the tournament was hosted on home soil. Gold, silver, bronze backgrounds indicates 1st, 2nd and 3rd finishes respectively. Bold text indicates best finish in tournament.

== See also ==
- Sport in Bhutan
  - Football in Bhutan
    - Women's football in Bhutan

National teams
Men's

- Bhutan national football team
- Bhutan national under-23 football team
- Bhutan national under-20 football team
- Bhutan national under-17 football team
- Bhutan national futsal team

Women's

- Bhutan women's national football team results
