= Lee Sung-jae (disambiguation) =

Lee Sung-jae (born 1970) is a South Korean actor.

Lee Sung-jae may also refer to:

- Lee Sung-jae (footballer born 1976), a South Korean footballer
- Lee Sung-jae (footballer born 1987), a South Korean footballer

== See also ==
- Lee Seung-jae (disambiguation)
- Lee Sung-jea (born 1968), a South Korean footballer
