= Janet W. Schofield =

Janet Ward Schofield is a social psychologist and professor emerita of psychology at the University of Pittsburgh. She also worked at the Learning Research and Development Center.

== Early life and education ==
Schofield studied at Harvard University, where she received a bachelor's degree in social relations, magna cum laude, in 1968, followed by a master's degree and, in 1972, a PhD in social psychology. She is a member of Phi Beta Kappa.

== Career ==
Schofield taught psychology and sociology at Spelman College in Atlanta from 1969 to 1970. She then worked in Washington, D.C. as a research psychologist, first in the policy research division of the Office of Economic Opportunity from 1972 and then at the National Institute of Education from 1973.

Schofield joined the University of Pittsburgh as an assistant professor in 1974. She was promoted to associate professor in 1980 and to professor in the social psychology program of the Department of Psychology in 1986. She became a senior scientist at the university's Learning Research and Development Center in 1983 and began chairing the social psychology program in 2002. She became professor emerita in September 2013. From 2009 to 2023, she was also senior advisor and professor of psychology at Royal Thimphu College in Bhutan.

Schofield was a member of the National Advisory Panel on School Desegregation Research, and in 2003 she sat on an advisory committee on race and ethnic relations among young people at the National Academy of Sciences. From 1993 to 1996, she was an elected member of the Council of Representatives of the American Psychological Association.

== Research ==
Schofield's research has examined school desegregation and relations between racial groups in schools, as well as the ways computers affect social processes in the classroom. Her reviews of research on the effects of desegregated schooling were cited by Justice Stephen Breyer in his dissent in Parents Involved in Community Schools v. Seattle School District No. 1 (2007).

Her book Black and White in School: Trust, Tension, or Tolerance?, which drew on her interviews with students, received the 1983 Gordon Allport Intergroup Relations Prize. In Computers and Classroom Culture (1995), she examined how the way schools and classrooms are socially organized shapes computer use, including the use of artificially intelligent tutors, why teachers made limited use of them and how gender shaped students' reactions. The book treated computers as having social as well as technical effects, and found that their use moved teachers toward a more guiding role while many teachers resisted them. With Ann Locke Davidson, she wrote Bringing the Internet to School: Lessons from an Urban District (2002), a study of how Internet use was introduced in the schools of an urban district and how it affected equity, academic work and social life.

== Books ==
- Schofield, Janet Ward (1982). Black and White in School: Trust, Tension, or Tolerance?. Praeger.
- Schofield, Janet Ward (1995). Computers and Classroom Culture. Cambridge University Press. doi:10.1017/CBO9780511571268. ISBN 978-0-521-47924-0.
- Schofield, Janet Ward; Davidson, Ann Locke (2002). Bringing the Internet to School: Lessons from an Urban District. Jossey-Bass. ISBN 978-0-7879-5686-8.

== Awards and recognition ==
Schofield won the 1983 Gordon Allport Intergroup Relations Prize of the Society for the Psychological Study of Social Issues and received an honorable mention for the same prize in 1991. She is a fellow of the Society for the Psychological Study of Social Issues and of Divisions 8, 15 and 48 of the American Psychological Association, and an inaugural fellow of the American Educational Research Association. The University of Pittsburgh chapter of Phi Eta Sigma elected her an honorary member for excellence in teaching.
