= Lee Seung-jae =

Lee Seung-jae may refer to:

- Lee Seung-jae (film producer), producer of multiple Kim Ki-duk films beginning with the 1998 Birdcage Inn
- Lee Seung-jae (speed skater), competitor for South Korea at the 2002 Winter Olympics
- Lee Seung-jae (footballer) (born 1998), South Korean footballer

== See also ==
- Lee Sung-jae (disambiguation)
- Seung-jae, a Korean given name
