= Peter Butler (footballer, born 1966) =

English football manager (born 1966)

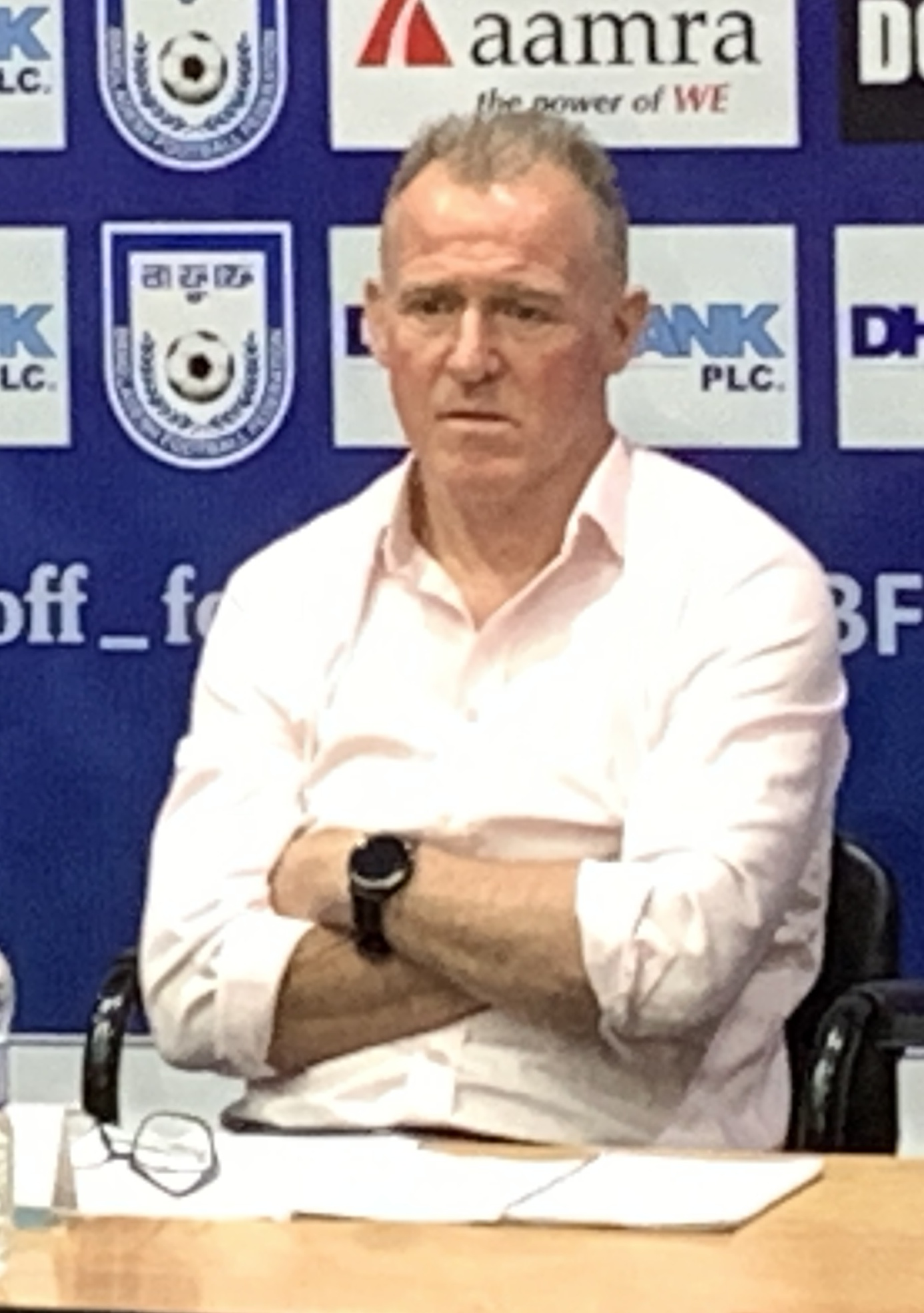
- Butler in 2025

Personal information
- Full name: Peter James Butler
- Date of birth: 27 August 1966 (age 60)
- Place of birth: Halifax, England
- Height: 5 ft 9 in (1.75 m)
- Position: Midfielder

Team information
- Current team: Bangladesh women (head coach)

Senior career*
Years	Team	Apps	(Gls)
1984–1986	Huddersfield Town	5	(0)
1986	→ Cambridge United (loan)	14	(1)
1986	Bury	11	(0)
1986–1988	Cambridge United	55	(9)
1988–1992	Southend United	142	(9)
1992	→ Huddersfield Town (loan)	7	(0)
1992–1994	West Ham United	70	(3)
1994–1996	Notts County	20	(0)
1996	→ Grimsby Town (loan)	3	(0)
1996	→ West Bromwich Albion (loan)	15	(0)
1996–1998	West Bromwich Albion	50	(0)
1998–2000	Halifax Town	63	(1)
2001–2002	Sorrento FC		
Total		455	(23)

Managerial career
- 2000: Halifax Town (caretaker manager)
- 2001–2002: Sorrento FC
- 2002–2004: Sabah FA
- 2006: Singapore Armed Forces FC
- 2006–2008: Persiba Balikpapan
- 2008–2009: Kelantan FA
- 2009–2010: Yangon United FC (technical director)
- 2010–2011: BEC Tero Sasana
- 2011–2012: Kelantan FA
- 2012: Persiba Balikpapan
- 2012: Terengganu FA
- 2012–2013: PBDKT T-Team FC
- 2014–2017: Botswana
- 2017: Platinum Stars
- 2018: Persipura
- 2018: PSMS
- 2019–2022: Liberia
- 2023–2024: BFF Elite Academy
- 2024–: Bangladesh women
- 2025–: Bangladesh women U20
Relatives	Chester Butler (son)
- * Club domestic league appearances and goals

Peter James Butler (born 27 August 1966) is an English professional football manager and former player who is the current manager of the Bangladesh women's national team. As a player, he made more than 450 appearances in the Football League and the Premier League. After retiring in October of 2000 he began coaching, working for teams in England, Australia and South-East Asia. He was in charge of the Botswana national team from 2014 until 2017. He currently holds a UEFA Pro License Qualification.

== Playing career ==
Butler played as a midfielder for Huddersfield Town, Cambridge United, Bury, Southend United, West Ham United, Notts County, Grimsby Town, West Bromwich Albion and Halifax Town.

== Coaching career ==
After a spell as caretaker manager of Halifax Town, Butler moved to Australia where he became player-manager of Sorrento FC 2000–2002, where he set up their academy. He then coached in Singapore with the Singapore Armed Forces Football Club (SAFFC), in Malaysia with Sabah FA, in Indonesia with Persiba Balikpapan, and then back to Malaysia as coach of Kelantan FA. In September of 2009, Butler signed a one-year contract as Technical Director and Head Coach of Yangon United FC of Myanmar. In September of 2010 Butler became head coach of Thai Premier League team BEC Tero Sasana F.C. Butler returned to Kelantan to become head coach for the second time in November of 2011. He resigned from this job in September of 2009, stating his wife's illness was the primary reason for the departure. Butler was immediately hired by Indonesian Super league side Persiba Balikpapan whom he coached in 2006-08 and led them into the newly formed ISL. He reportedly resigned from Persiba in May 2012, but his resignation is challenged by the club.

=== Terengganu and T-Team ===
He officially took over the head coach role at Terengganu FA, from Mat Zan Mat Aris on 1 June 2012, although he had already performed his duties as Terengganu head coach before the date. As head coach Butler reprimanded two players for returning from a night out at 3am on a morning before a match. He actions were mainly backed by the Malaysian public. However the club's management did not support his stance leading to a six-month ban, RM4,000 fine, 15 per cent cut on monthly salary and the termination of his contract.

The penalties received by Butler were considered by the public to be unjust and a means of simply removing him from the club. He was left with 15 months payment on his contract outstanding. The Football Association of Malaysia declared their intent to investigate the situation.

On 18 October, Football Association of Malaysia's disciplinary board completely exonerated Butler of any charges, quashed the suspension imposed on him and publicly condemned the Terengganu FA of bringing shame to the FAM, the TFA were ordered to pay Butler the remaining months on his contract.

=== Botswana ===
In February 2014, Butler was appointed manager of the Botswana national team. In his first International game he beat South Sudan 3-0, before losing to Eswatini 4-1. Botswana then went on to beat Burundi & Guinea-Bissau to reach the group stages of the 2015 Africa Cup of Nations qualification. They ended up losing 2-1 to Tunisia in their first game, before losing 2-0 to Egypt, 2-0 to Senegal, and 2-0 to Egypt in their next 3 games. They were able to draw Tunisia 0-0 in their 5th game but lost 3-0 to Senegal in their final match, finishing the group in 4th place with only 1 point.

In October of 2015 Butler guided Botswana to a 5-1 win over 2 matches in their 2018 FIFA World Cup qualification (CAF) first round against Eritrea. Botswana were then defeated by Mali in the second round, winning the first match 2-1 at the Obed Itani Chilume Stadium before losing 2-0 at the Stade du 26 Mars in the return match.

When asked about Botswana in an interview, Butler said that "It's a beautiful country, and the raw passion that Botswanans have for the game is unbelievable. In fact, most of Africa has such an incredibly deep love and enthusiasm for football. You can really feel it when you spend time here."

In February 2017 he was one of a number of managers on the shortlist for the vacant Rwanda national team manager role.

Butler resigned from the Botswana job in June 2017, and within days was appointed as the new head coach of Platinum Stars in South Africa's Premier Soccer League. He departed the position in September 2017.

=== Liberia ===
On 21 August 2019, he was appointed as manager of the Liberia national football team.

=== BFF Elite Football Academy ===
On 23 November 2023, he was appointed as coach of the BFF Elite Football Academy which is directly operated by Bangladesh Football Federation. When asked about the job, he said that he needed a new challenge and a change. He was scheduled to take charge of the academy from 1 January 2024. However, he officially took control of the academy from 18 January 2024.

=== Bangladesh women's national team ===
In March 2024, Butler was made the temporary head coach of the Bangladesh women's national football team while also coaching at the BFF Elite Football Academy. Eventually, following the conclusion of the 2023–24 Bangladesh Championship League, he was made the permanent head coach and departed from his role at the Academy.

On 31 May 2024, Bangladesh lost 0–4 to Chinese Taipei in his first game incharge.

On 30 October 2024, under the guidance of head coach Peter Butler, Bangladesh won their second-ever SAFF Women's Championship title, defeating Nepal 2–1 in the final of the 2024 edition.

On 2 July 2025, Bangladesh, still under Butler’s management, qualified for the 2026 AFC Women's Asian Cup for the first time in their history. They secured qualification with a match to spare, following a dominant 7–0 victory over Pot 2 side Bahrain and a 2–1 win against Pot 1 side and Group C hosts Myanmar. At the time of qualification, Bangladesh were ranked 128th in the world, making them the lowest-ranked team ever to qualify for the AFC Women's Asian Cup.

== Managerial statistics ==
Team	From	To	Record							
Team	From	To	G	W	D	L	GF	GA	GD	Win %
Bangladesh women	March 2024	Present	26	10	3	13	51	52	−1	38.46
Bangladesh U20 women	July 2025	Present	18	12	1	5	63	22	+41	66.67

== Honours ==
=== Managerial ===
Bangladesh women

- SAFF Women's Championship: 2024
- Qualified for 2026 AFC Women's Asian Cup

Bangladesh women U-20

- SAFF U-20 Women's Championship: 2025
- Qualified for 2026 AFC U-20 Women's Asian Cup
