= Maymol Rocky =

Indian female coach

Personal information
- Full name: Maymol Nedugadan Rocky
- Date of birth: 19 May 1984 (age 42)
- Place of birth: Angamaly, Kerala, India
- Position: Right back

Senior career*
Years	Team	Apps	(Gls)
2000–2011	Goa		

International career
2003	India		

Managerial career
- 2017: India Women (assistant)
- 2017–2021: India Women
- 2023: India U20 (women)
- 2023: India Women (assistant)
- * Club domestic league appearances and goals

Maymol Nedugadan Rocky (born 19 May 1984) is an Indian football manager and former footballer and currently the head coach of the India women's under-20 football team. She was the first female coach to be appointed the head coach of India women's national football team.

== Early life ==
Maymol hailed from Kerala, and grew up in Dabolim in Goa.

== Career ==
Maymol started her sports career in Athletics. She also developed a love for football, and in 2000 represented Goa in the National Championships. The next year, Maymol made her International debut for the Indian Women's Senior Team as a right back. Her first international tournament was Asian Football Confederation Women's Championship 2001 held in Chinese Taipei when she was only 17 years. Maymol continued playing till 2012.

As a coach, Maymol and an AFC ‘A’ Coaching Certificate and is also an instructor for the AIFF ‘D’ License Instructors Course. Before, being appointed as the head coach of the Indian Senior Women's National Team, the All India Football Federation had tasked Maymol with the role of coaching the junior teams from 2012, after which she graduated to the senior ranks as an assistant coach.

Maymol works with the Sports Authority of Goa as a football coach, when she is not with the Indian Teams on coaching duty.

Her first assignment as head coach of the Indian women's team was the 2018 COTIF Tournament. On 19 July 2021, Maymol resigned from the post of Indian Women's head coach citing personal reasons.

In January 2023, she was appointed the head coach of the India women's under-20 football team.

== Honours ==
=== Manager ===
India Women

- SAFF Women's Championship: 2019
- South Asian Games Gold medal: 2019
