= Kanglung Gewog =

Kanglung Gewog བཀང་ལུང་
- Gewog
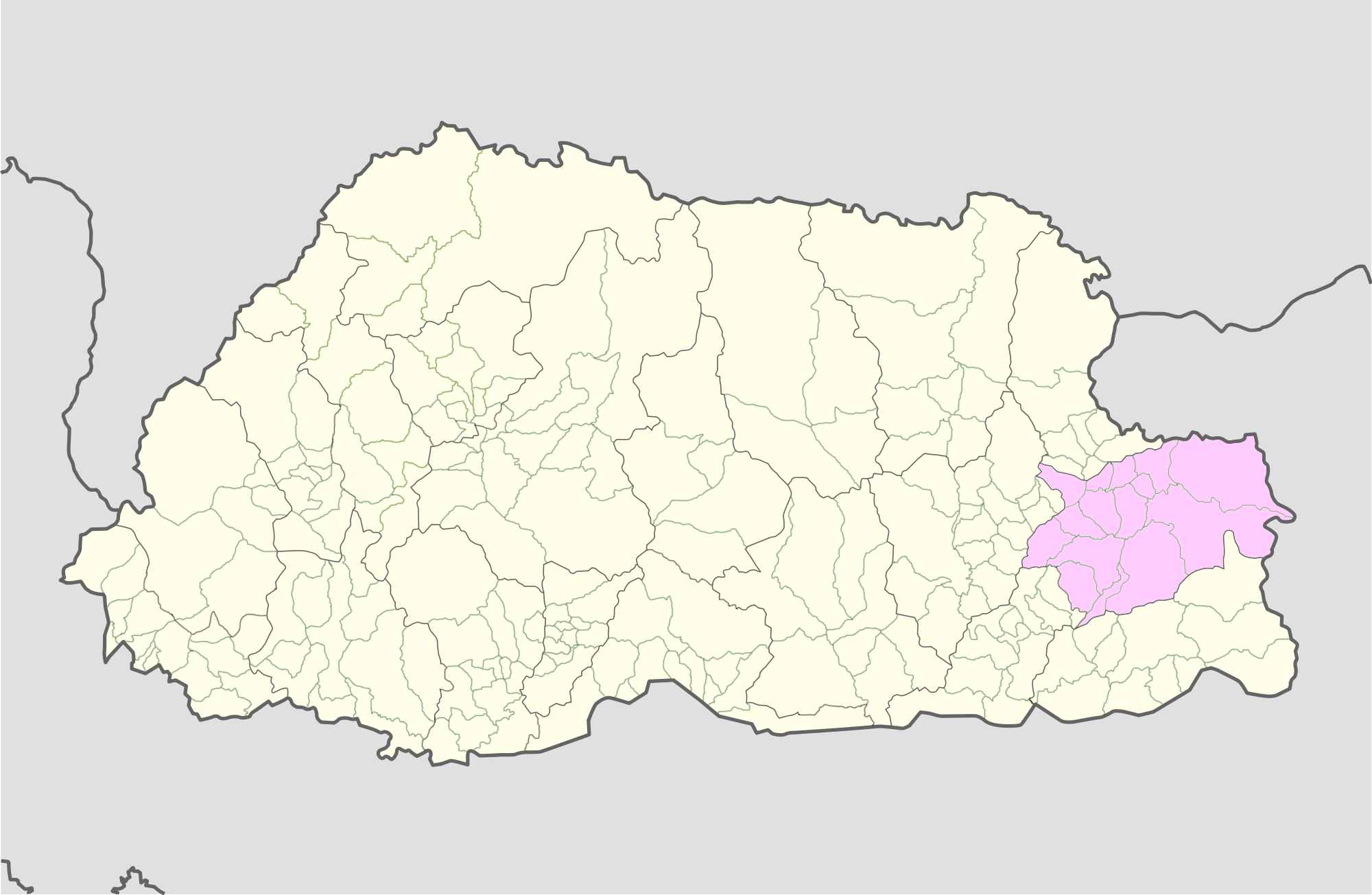
- Country: Bhutan
- District: Trashigang District
- Time zone: UTC+6 (BTT)

Kanglung Gewog (Dzongkha: བཀང་ལུང་) is a gewog (village block) of Trashigang District, Bhutan. Kanglung is in eastern Bhutan and is known for being home to Shebrubtse college and also known as Domkhar Kanglung gewog has a total of 67.14 km sq area. Kanglung Gewog has a total population of 7,316. It consists of 3,944 males and 3,372 females. The construction of Zangdopelri was made feasible because of the industrious labor of Sharcho Khorlo Tshebgay, under Tamshing Jakar in 1978. The Zangdopelri is three storied and has some important relics. Today it is considered as one of the most sacred and oldest in the areas. Kanglung gewog has one domestic airport at Yonphula, which helps the people with better transportation service within Bhutan.
