= Rupna Chakma =

Bangladeshi football player (born 2004)

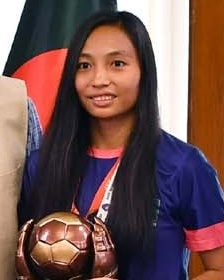
- Rupna in 2024

Personal information
- Full name: Rupna Chakma
- Date of birth: 2 January 2004 (age 22)
- Place of birth: Naniarchar, Rangamati, Chittagong Division, Bangladesh
- Height: 1.57 m (5 ft 2 in)
- Position: Goalkeeper

Team information
- Current team: Rajshahi Stars
- Number: 1

Youth career
- Suehlamong FA

Senior career*
Years	Team	Apps	(Gls)
2020–2024	Bashundhara Kings	25	(0)
2025–2026	Transport United Ladies	6	(0)
2026–	Rajshahi Stars	10	(0)

International career^{‡}
2018–2020	Bangladesh U17		(0)
2018–2022	Bangladesh U19	19	(0)
2019–	Bangladesh	41	(0)
2018	Bangladesh futsal	3	(0)
Medal record
Women's football
Representing Bangladesh
SAFF Women's Championship
Winner	2022 Nepal
Winner	2024 Nepal
SAFF U-18/U-19/U-20 Women's Championship
Winner	2018 Bhutan
Winner	2021 Bangladesh
Bangamata U-19 Women's International Gold Cup
Winner	2019 Bangladesh
- * Club domestic league appearances and goals as of 16 February 2026 ‡ National team caps and goals as of 21 September 2026

Rupna Chakma (Chakma: 𑄢𑄪𑄛𑄴𑄚 𑄌𑄋𑄴𑄟𑄳𑄦; Bengali: রুপনা চাকমা) is a Bangladeshi professional football player who plays for the Bangladesh national team and Rajshahi Stars.

She was part of the Bangladesh team that won the 2022 and 2024 SAFF Women's Championship and was named "The best goalkeeper" in both of those tournaments.

She has also played for the Bangladesh women's national futsal team.

== Club career ==
=== Bashundhara Kings ===
In 2020, Rupna signed with Bashundhara Kings Women for the Bangladesh Women's Football League. During her tenure with the club, she was a key part of the squad that secured consecutive league titles in the 2020–21 and 2021–22 seasons. She made 25 appearances for the club before her departure in early 2025.

=== Transport United ===
In April 2025, Rupna moved abroad for the first time, joining the Bhutanese club Transport United Ladies for the Bhutan Women's National League. She was part of a group of five Bangladeshi players recruited to the league following their regional success.

=== Rajshahi Stars ===
Rupna joined Rajshahi Stars for the 2025–26 Bangladesh Women's Football League, where her debut match resulted in a 12–0 win. She became the league's best goalkeeper in the season.

== International career ==
Chakma played in the Bangladesh under-16 team in 2019.

In 2018, she joined the Under-19 Women's Team in the 2021 SAFF Championship, where Bangladesh defeatedIndia in the final.

She made her senior international debut in 2019. She starred in the 2022 SAFF Women's Championship, where Bangladesh won the title for the first time, and Rupna was awarded the Best Goalkeeper trophy.

In October 2024, she helped Bangladesh defend its title at the 2024 SAFF Women's Championship, and was again named the tournament's best goalkeeper.

In 2025, she was part of the squad that achieved Bangladesh's historic first qualification for the 2026 AFC Women's Asian Cup.

== Honours ==
Bashundhara Kings

- Bangladesh Women's Football League: 2020–21, 2021–22

Rajshahi Stars

- Bangladesh Women's Football League: 2025–26

Bangladesh

- SAFF Women's Championship: 2022, 2024

Bangladesh U20

- SAFF U-20 Women's Championship: 2018, 2021
- Bangamata U-19 Women's Gold Cup: 2019

Individual

- SAFF Women's Championship Best Goalkeeper: 2022, 2024

== Personal life ==
Rupna's achievements brought attention to her family's struggles. After the 2022 SAFF Women's Football Tournament, the deputy commissioner of Rangamati visited Rupna's home and provided financial support. Media coverage of her story caught the attention of former Prime Minister Sheikh Hasina, who ordered that a new house be built for Rupna's family.
