= 2024 SAFF Women's Championship =

Tournament details
- Host country: Nepal
- Dates: 17–30 October 2024
- Teams: 7 (from 1 sub-confederation)
- Venue: 1 (in 1 host city)

Final positions
- Champions: Bangladesh (2nd title)
- Runners-up: Nepal

Tournament statistics
- Matches played: 12
- Goals scored: 62 (5.17 per match)
- Attendance: 55,371 (4,614 per match)
- Top scorer(s): (Bhutan) Deki Lhazom (8 goals)
- Best player: (Bangladesh) Ritu Porna Chakma
- Best goalkeeper: (Bangladesh) Rupna Chakma
- Fair play award: Bhutan

The 2024 SAFF Women's Championship was the 7th edition of the SAFF Women's Championship, the international women's football championship contested by the national teams of the South Asian Football Federation (SAFF). The tournament was played 17–30 October 2024 in Kathmandu, Nepal.

Bangladesh was the defending champion. In the final, Bangladesh played against Nepal on 30 October 2024 at the Dasharath Rangasala Stadium in Kathmandu. Bangladesh won the final match 2–1, claiming their second SAFF title.

== Participating teams ==
The following seven teams were participated in the tournament.

Country	Appearance	Previous best performance	FIFA ranking August 2024
India	7th	Champions (2010, 2012, 2014, 2016, 2019)	68
Nepal (Host)	7th	Runners-up (2010, 2012, 2014, 2019, 2022)	99
Bangladesh	7th	Champions (2022)	139
Sri Lanka	7th	Semi-finals (2012, 2014, 2019)	157
Pakistan	5th	Semi-finals (2010)	158
Maldives	7th	Semi-finals (2016)	161
Bhutan	7th	Semi-finals (2022)	175

== Venue ==
All matches were played at this ground.

Kathmandu
Dasharath Rangasala
Capacity: 20,000
Kathmandu is located in Nepal

== Draw ==
The draw ceremony of the tournament was held in Hotel InterContinental, Dhaka, Bangladesh on 8 June 2024. The seven participants was divided into two groups which Group A consist three teams & followed by Group B four teams.

=== Pots ===
Pot 1	Pot 2	Pot 3	Pot 4
India; Nepal (hosts)	Maldives; Bangladesh	Bhutan; Pakistan	Sri Lanka

=== Result ===
Group A
Pos	Team
A1	India
A2	Bangladesh
A3	Pakistan

Group B
Pos	Team
B1	Nepal
B2	Sri Lanka
B3	Maldives
B4	Bhutan

== Match officials ==
The following officials were chosen for the competition by BFF tournament committee.

Referees

- (Bangladesh) Jaya Chakma
- (Bhutan) Choki Om
- (India) Kanika Barman
- (Nepal) Anjana Rai
- (Sri Lanka) Y. A. Pabasara Minisaraniyapa

Assistant referees

- (Bangladesh) Salma Akter Mone
- (Bhutan) Tshering Choden
- (India) Ujjal Halder
- (Nepal) Merina Dhimal
- (Sri Lanka) H. M. Malika Madhushani

== Group stage ==
- All matches were played at Nepal.
- Times listed are UTC+05:45.

Key to colours in group tables
Group winners and runners-up advance to the Semi-finals

=== Group A ===
Pos	Team	Pld	W	D	L	GF	GA	GD	Pts	Qualification
1	Bangladesh	2	1	1	0	4	2	+2	4	Qualified for Knockout stage
2	India	2	1	0	1	6	5	+1	3	Qualified for Knockout stage
3	Pakistan	2	0	1	1	3	6	−3	1	

Source: Soccerway
17 October 2024
17:30

Pakistan	2–5	India
Suha Hirani 45+2' (pen.); Kayla Siddiqi 47'	Report	Dangmei 5', 42'; Manisha 17'; Bala Devi 35'; Chouhan 78'

Dasharath Rangasala, Kathmandu
Attendance: 452
Referee: Anjana Rai (Nepal)

20 October 2024
17:30

Bangladesh	1–1	Pakistan
Shamsunnahar Jr. 90+1'	Report	Malik 32'

Dasharath Rangasala, Kathmandu
Attendance: 307
Referee: Choki Om (Bhutan)

23 October 2024
17:30

India	1–3	Bangladesh
Bala Devi 43'	Report	Afeida 19'; Tohura 29', 42'

Dasharath Rangasala, Kathmandu
Attendance: 251
Referee: Choki Om (Bhutan)

=== Group B ===
Pos	Team	Pld	W	D	L	GF	GA	GD	Pts	Qualification
1	Nepal (H)	3	2	1	0	17	0	+17	7	Qualified for Knockout stage
2	Bhutan	3	2	1	0	17	1	+16	7	Qualified for Knockout stage
3	Sri Lanka	3	1	0	2	2	10	−8	3	
4	Maldives	3	0	0	3	0	25	−25	0	

Source: Soccerway
(H) Hosts
18 October 2024
13:30

Sri Lanka	1–0	Maldives
Dilasha Imasha 17'	Report

Dasharath Rangasala, Kathmandu
Attendance: 104
Referee: Jaya Chakma (Bangladesh)

18 October 2024
17:30

Nepal	0–0	Bhutan
	Report

Dasharath Rangasala, Kathmandu
Attendance: 5,562
Referee: Y.A. Pabasara Minisaraniyapa (Sri Lanka)

21 October 2024
13:30

Bhutan	4–1	Sri Lanka
Lhazom 7', 76'; Dorji Edon 32'; Namgyel Dema 79'	Report	Thushani Madushika 23'

Dasharath Rangasala, Kathmandu
Attendance: 214
Referee: Kanika Barman (India)

21 October 2024
17:30

Maldives	0–11	Nepal
	Report	Preeti 5', 65', 87' (pen.); Sabita Rana Magar 29'; Rekha 32', 42', 48', 63', 78'; Anita KC 69'; Amisha Karki 88'

Dasharath Rangasala, Kathmandu
Attendance: 6,671
Referee: Y.A. Pabasara Minisaraniyapa (Sri Lanka)

24 October 2024
13:30

Maldives	0–13	Bhutan
	Report	Sonam Choden 5'; Tshering 7', 18'; Lhazom 14', 19', 46', 52', 70'; Namgyel Dema 41'; Deki Yangdon 47'; Tshering Yangden 65', 80'; Tshering Lhaden 68'

Dasharath Rangasala, Kathmandu
Attendance: 325
Referee: Jaya Chakma (Bangladesh)

24 October 2024
17:30

Nepal	6–0	Sri Lanka
Sabita Rana Magar 8'; Sabitra 12'; Rekha 13', 36'; Amisha Karki 47'; Rashmi Kumari Ghising 90+4'	Report

Dasharath Rangasala, Kathmandu
Attendance: 7,617
Referee: Kanika Barman (India)

== Knockout stage ==
- In the knockout stages, if a match finished goalless at the end of normal playing time, extra time would have been played (two periods of 15 minutes each) and followed, if necessary, by a penalty shoot-out to determine the winner.

=== Bracket ===
Semi-finals
27 October – Kathmandu
Bangladesh	7
Bhutan	1
27 October – Kathmandu
Nepal (p)	1 (4)
India	1 (2)

Final
30 October – Kathmandu
Bangladesh	2
Nepal	1

=== Semi-finals ===
27 October 2024
13:30

Bangladesh	7–1	Bhutan
Ritu 7'; Tohura 15', 35', 58'; Sabina 26', 37'; Sheuli 72'	Report	Lhazom 41'

Dasharath Rangasala, Kathmandu
Attendance: 486
Referee: Y.A. Pabasara Minisaraniyapa (Sri Lanka)
27 October 2024
18:30

Nepal	1–1	India
Bhandari 66'	Report	Basfore 62'
Penalties
Bhandari (penalty scored); Rana (penalty scored); Sabita Rana Magar (penalty scored); Amisha Karki (penalty scored)	4–2	(penalty missed) Ashalata Devi; (penalty scored) Manisha; (penalty scored) Shirvoikar; (penalty missed) Ranjana Chanu

Dasharath Rangasala, Kathmandu
Attendance: 18,009
Referee: Choki Om (Bhutan)

=== Final ===
30 October 2024
18:30

Bangladesh	2–1	Nepal
Monika 52'; Ritu 81'	Report	Amisha Karki 56'

Dasharath Rangasala, Kathmandu
Attendance: 15,373
Referee: Kanika Barman (India)

== Winner ==
7th SAFF Women's Championship 2024

Bangladesh
Second title

== Awards ==
The following awards were given at the conclusion of the tournament. The Top scorers (top scorer), Most Valuable Player (best overall player) and Best Goalkeeper (goalkeeper with the most clean sheets) awards were given.

Most Valuable Player	Top scorer(s)	Best Goalkeeper	Fair Play Award
(Bangladesh) Ritu Porna Chakma	(Bhutan) Deki Lhazom (8 goals)	(Bangladesh) Rupna Chakma	Bhutan

== Statistics ==
=== Goalscorers ===
There were 62 goals scored in 12 matches, for an average of 5.17 goals per match.

8 goals

- (Bhutan) Deki Lhazom

7 goals

- (Nepal) Rekha Poudel

5 goals

- (Bangladesh) Tohura Khatun

3 goals

- (Nepal) Preeti Rai
- (Nepal) Amisha Karki

2 goals

- (Bangladesh) Ritu Porna Chakma
- (Bangladesh) Sabina Khatun
- (Bhutan) Tshering Yanden
- (Bhutan) Namgyel Dema
- (Bhutan) Pema Choden Tshering
- (India) Bala Devi
- (India) Grace Dangmei
- (Nepal) Sabita Rana Magar
- (Nepal) Sabitra Bhandari

1 goal

- (Bangladesh) Monika Chakma
- (Bangladesh) Sheuli Azim
- (Bangladesh) Shamsunnahar Jr.
- (Bangladesh) Afeida Khandaker
- (Bhutan) Deki Yangdon
- (Bhutan) Dorji Edon
- (Bhutan) Sonam Choden
- (Bhutan) Tshering Lhaden
- (India) Manisha Kalyan
- (India) Jyoti Chouhan
- (Nepal) Anita KC
- (Nepal) Rashmi Kumari Ghising
- (Pakistan) Suha Hirani
- (Pakistan) Kayla Siddiqi
- (Pakistan) Zahmena Malik
- (Sri Lanka) Dilasha Imasha
- (Sri Lanka) Thushani Madushika

Source: GSA

=== Hat-tricks ===
† Bold Club indicates winner of the match.

Player	For	Against	Result	Date	Ref
(Nepal) Preeti Rai^{3}	Nepal	Maldives	11–0	21 October 2024	
(Nepal) Rekha Poudel^{5}	Nepal	Maldives	11–0	21 October 2024	
(Bhutan) Deki Lhazom^{5}	Bhutan	Maldives	13–0	24 October 2024	
(Bangladesh) Tohura Khatun^{3}	Bangladesh	Bhutan	7–1	27 October 2024	

== Broadcasting rights ==
Country	Broadcaster	Ref.
India	FanCode	fancode.com
Nepal	Kantipur Max HD, Kantipur Max HD (YouTube)	Kantipur Max HD on YouTube

== See also ==
- 2024 SAFF U-17 Championship
- 2024 SAFF U-20 Championship
