= Tashi Wangmo =

Bhutanese politician

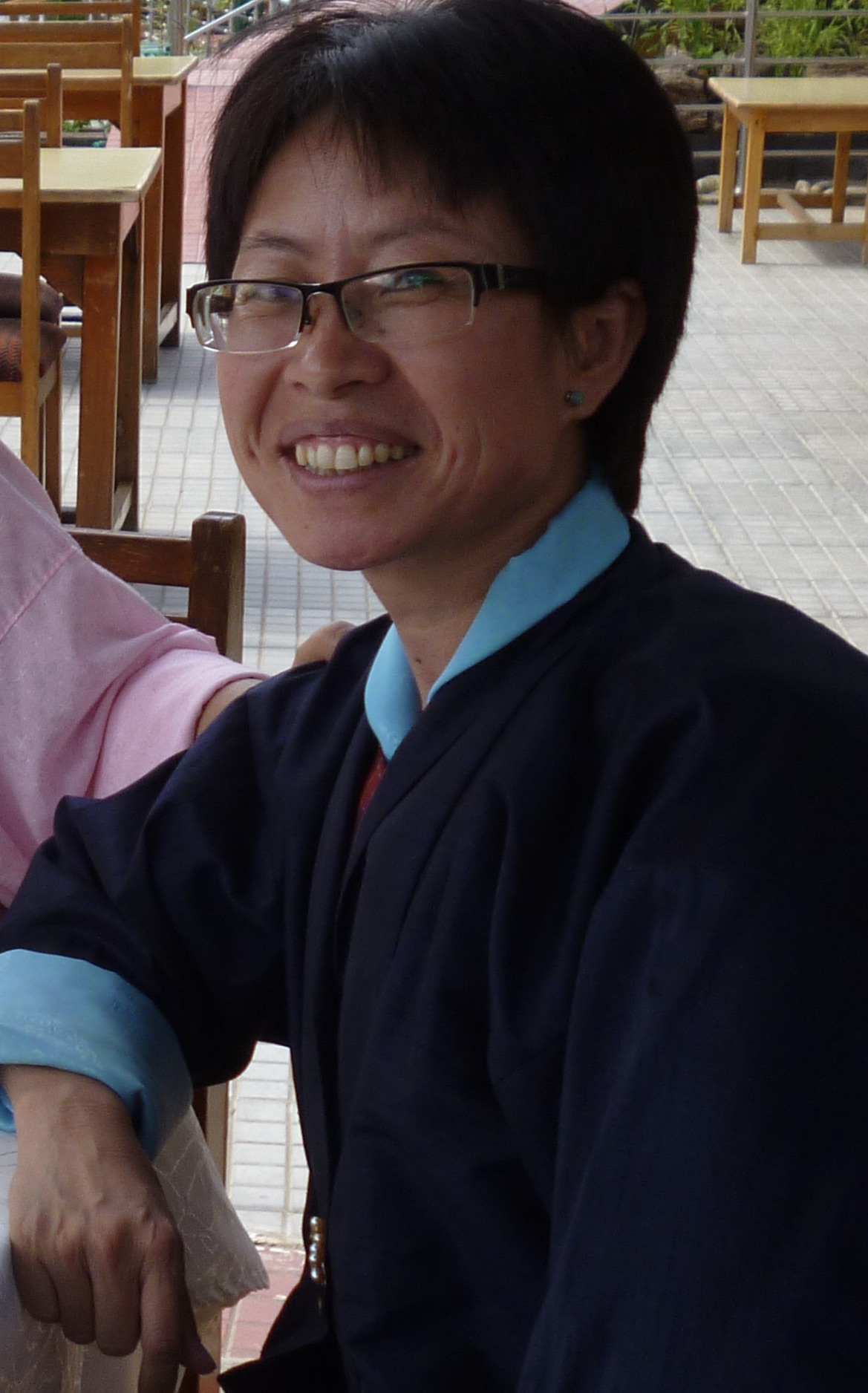

Appointed member of the National Council of Bhutan
- In office 10 May 2018 – ongoing
- In office 2013–2018
- In office 2008–2013

Personal details
- Born: 19 February 1973 (age 53) Mangthong, Kanglung, Trashigang, Bhutan

Tashi Wangmo (born 19 February 1973) is a member of the National Council of Bhutan.

== Background ==
=== Education ===
Tashi Wangmo attended primary school in Kanglung, high school at Khaling and later Sherubtse. She won a scholarship to attend University of Wollongong, in Australia and graduated in 1997 with a Bachelor of Mechanical Engineering (Honours). In 2014 the university gave her their outstanding alumni award. In 2003, Tashi completed a Masters in Public Policy at the National Graduate Institute for Policy Studies (GRIPS), in Tokyo, Japan.

=== Career ===
Tashi Wangmo worked as Assistant Engineer in the Department of Civil Aviation from 1999-2000. She moved to the National Technical Training Authority (NTTA) for three years before being appointed Head of the Policy and Planning Division of the Ministry of Labour and Human Resources. In 2008, Tashi Wangmo, then only 35 years old, was appointed to the National Council as a special nominee of the King of Bhutan. She retained her position through the elections of 2013 and 2018.

The World Economic Forum in Geneva chose her as one of their Young Global Leaders in 2010.
