= SAFF Women's Championship =

- Organiser(s): SAFF
- Founded: 2010; 16 years ago
- Region: South Asia
- Teams: 7: Bangladesh; Bhutan; India; Maldives; Nepal; Pakistan; Sri Lanka
- Related competitions: SAFF Championship
- Current champions: India (6th title)
- Most championships: India (6 titles)
- Broadcaster: FanCode
- Website: saffederation.org
- 2026 SAFF Women's Championship

The SAFF Women's Championship, also called the South Asian Football Federation Women's Cup, is a competition for women's national football teams governed by the South Asian Football Federation (SAFF). All seven members are eligible to participate in the tournament. India are the current champions, having defeated Bangladesh in Goa. However India remain most successful team in the history of the competition, having won six titles, while Bangladesh has won the title twice.

== History ==
The current SAFF members are Bangladesh, Bhutan, India, Maldives, Nepal, Pakistan and Sri Lanka. Formerly, eight members used to compete against each other, until Afghanistan departed. It is held approximately every two years. India won first 5 editions, beating Nepal four times and Bangladesh once in the final.

== Results ==
Ed.	Year	Host	Final			Losing semi-finalists	No. of teams
Ed.	Year	Host	Champion	Score	Runner-up	Losing semi-finalists	No. of teams
1	2010	Bangladesh	India	1–0	Nepal	Bangladesh and Pakistan	8
2	2012	Sri Lanka	India	3–1	Nepal	Afghanistan and Sri Lanka	8
3	2014	Pakistan	India	6–0	Nepal	Bangladesh and Sri Lanka	8
4	2016	India	India	3–1	Bangladesh	Maldives and Nepal	7
5	2019	Nepal	India	3–1	Nepal	Bangladesh and Sri Lanka	6
6	2022	Nepal	Bangladesh	3–1	Nepal	Bhutan and India	7
7	2024	Nepal	Bangladesh	2–1	Nepal	Bhutan and India	7
8	2026	India	India	3–1	Bangladesh	Bhutan and Nepal	6
9	2028						
10	2030						

== Teams reaching the top four ==
Nation	Champions	Runners-up	Semi-finalists
India	6 (2010, 2012, 2014, **2016**, 2019, **2026**)		2 (2022, 2024)
Bangladesh	2 (2022, 2024)	2 (2016, 2026)	3 (**2010**, 2014, 2019)
Nepal		6 (2010, 2012, 2014, **2019**, **2022**, **2024**)	2 (2016, 2026)
Sri Lanka			3 (**2012**, 2014, 2019)
Bhutan			3 (2022, 2024, 2026)
Afghanistan*			1 (2012)
Maldives			1 (2016)
Pakistan			1 (2012)

Bold = Hosts
* = Not part of SAFF anymore

== Overall team records ==
In this ranking 3 points are awarded for a win, 1 for a draw and 0 for a loss. As per statistical convention in football, matches decided in extra time are counted as wins and losses, while matches decided by penalty shoot-outs are counted as draws. Teams are ranked by total points, then by goal difference, then by goals scored.

As of 2026 SAFF Women's Championship

Rank	Team	Part	Pld	W	D	L	GF	GA	Dif	Pts
1	India	8	34	29	2	3	175	17	+158	89
2	Nepal	8	35	25	2	8	137	25	+112	77
3	Bangladesh	8	31	18	2	11	81	46	+35	56
4	Sri Lanka	8	27	8	1	18	22	80	–58	25
5	Pakistan	5	15	5	1	9	23	53	–30	16
6	Bhutan	8	24	4	1	19	30	99	–69	13
7	Maldives	8	23	3	2	18	16	115	–99	11
8	Afghanistan	4	12	1	2	9	10	67	–57	5

== Results by tournament ==
Legend

- **1st** – Champions
- **2nd** – Runners-up
- **3rd** – Third place
- **4th** – Fourth place
- **SF** – Semifinals
- GS – Group stage
- dq – Disqualified/Suspended by FIFA/AFC/SAFF
- q – Qualified for upcoming tournament
- — Hosts
- × – Did not enter
- × – Withdrew before tournament begins
- — Not part of SAFF

Team	(Bangladesh) 2010	(Sri Lanka) 2012	(Pakistan) 2014	(India) 2016	(Nepal) 2019	(Nepal) 2022	(Nepal) 2024	(India) 2026	Total
Bangladesh	**SF**	GS	**SF**	**2nd**	**SF**	**1st**	**1st**	**2nd**	8
Bhutan	GS	GS	GS	GS	GS	**SF**	**SF**	**SF**	8
India	**1st**	**1st**	**1st**	**1st**	**1st**	**SF**	**SF**	**1st**	8
Nepal	**2nd**	**2nd**	**2nd**	**SF**	**2nd**	**2nd**	**2nd**	**SF**	8
Maldives	GS	GS	GS	**SF**	GS	GS	GS	GS	8
Pakistan	**SF**	GS	GS	×	×	GS	GS	×	5
Sri Lanka	GS	**SF**	**SF**	GS	**SF**	GS	GS	GS	8
Former team(s)
Afghanistan	GS	**SF**	GS	GS	Not part of SAFF				4

== Overall top goalscorers ==
Name	Goals
(India) Bala Devi	27
(Bangladesh) Sabina Khatun	26
(Nepal) Anu Lama	22
(Nepal) Sabitra Bhandari	21
(India) Sasmita Mallik	20
(Nepal) Jamuna Gurung	17
(India) Kamala Devi	17
(Nepal) Sajana Rana	10
(Bhutan) Deki Lhazom	10
(Nepal) Rekha Poudel	8

== Winning coaches ==
Year	Team	Coach
2010	India	(India) MD. Shahid Jabbar
2012	India	(India) MD. Shahid Jabbar
2014	India	(India) Tarun Roy
2016	India	(India) Sajid Dar
2019	India	(India) Maymol Rocky
2022	Bangladesh	(Bangladesh) Golam Robbani
2024	Bangladesh	(England) Peter Butler
2026	India	(India) Crispin Chettri

== Awards ==
The following awards are given at the conclusion of the tournament.

Year	Most Valuable Player	Top scorer(s)		Best goalkeeper	Fair play award
Year	Most Valuable Player	Player(s)	Goals	Best goalkeeper	Fair play award
2010	(India) Bala Devi	(India) Sasmita Malik	13	Not awarded	Not awarded
2012	(India) Kamala Devi	(Nepal) Jamuna Gurung	8	Not awarded	Not awarded
2014	(Bangladesh) Sabina Khatun	(India) Bala Devi	16	Not awarded	Maldives
2016	(India) Indumathi Kathiresan	(Nepal) Sabitra Bhandari	12	Not awarded	Nepal
2019	(India) Grace Dangmei	(Nepal) Sabitra Bhandari (India) Indumathi Kathiresan	4	Not awarded	Bangladesh
2022	(Bangladesh) Sabina Khatun	(Bangladesh) Sabina Khatun	8	(Bangladesh) Rupna Chakma	Bangladesh
2024	(Bangladesh) Ritu Porna	(Bhutan) Deki Lhazom	8	(Bangladesh) Rupna Chakma	Bhutan
2026	(India) Sanfida Nongrum	(India) Aveka Singh	4	(India) Panthoi Chanu Elangbam	Nepal

== See also ==
- SAFF Championship
- AFC Women's Asian Cup
- Football at the Asian Games
- ASEAN Women's Championship
- CAFA Women's Championship
- EAFF E-1 Women's Football Championship
- WAFF Women's Championship
- Sub-continental football championships in Asia
- Football at the South Asian Games
- SABA Women's Championship
- CAVA Women's Volleyball Nations League
- SAFF U-20 Championship
- SAFF U-17 Championship
- SAFF U-20 Women's Championship
- SAFF U-17 Women's Championship
