= Lee Sung-jea =

South Korean footballer and manager

Personal information
- Date of birth: 29 March 1968 (age 58)
- Place of birth: South Korea

Youth career
- Sangji University

Senior career*
Years	Team	Apps	(Gls)
1993	Korail FC		

Managerial career
- 2005–2006: Afghanistan U-20
- 2007: Afghanistan U-23
- 2014–2015: South Sudan
- 2016–2019: Bhutan (women's)
- * Club domestic league appearances and goals

- Lee Sung-jea
- Hangul: 이성제
- RR: I Seongje
- MR: I Sŏngje
- IPA: iː.sʰʌŋ.dʑe

Lee Sung-jea (Korean: 이성제, Korean pronunciation: [iː.sʌŋ.dʑe]; born on 29 March 1968) is a South Korean football manager and former player.

== Club career ==
He played for Korail FC in Korea National League.

== Managerial career ==
He was appointed a South Sudan manager in 2014.
