= Seung-jae =

- Hangul: 승재
- RR: Seungjae
- MR: Sŭngjae

Seung-jae is a Korean given name.

People with this name include:

- Woo Seung-jae (born 1986), South Korean wrestler
- Seo Seung-jae (born 1997), South Korean badminton player
- Lee Seung-jae (speed skater) (born 1982), South Korean speed skater who represented South Korea at the 2002 Winter Olympics

Fictional characters with this name include:

- Kang Seung-jae, character played by Yoon Kye-sang in 2004 South Korean television series My 19 Year Old Sister-in-Law
- Lee Seung-jae, character played by Oh Jung-se in 2013 South Korean film How to Use Guys with Secret Tips
- Mo Seung-jae, character played by Yeon Jung-hoon in 2017 South Korean television series Man to Man

== See also ==
- List of Korean given names
