= Krishna Khatri =

Nepalese footballer

Krishna Khatri (Nepali: कृष्णा खत्री) is a Nepalese woman's footballer who has played for the Nepal women's national football team.
