= Sonam Choden =

Bhutanese footballer (born 2002)

Personal information
- Date of birth: 16 May 2002 (age 24)
- Place of birth: Bhutan
- Position: Midfielder

Team information
- Current team: Royal Thimphu College

Senior career*
Years	Team	Apps	(Gls)
- Gelephu Girls Academy
- Mandala FC
2023–2025	Royal Thimphu College		
2025	Kickstart	1	(0)
2025–	Royal Thimphu College		

International career
	Bhutan	18	(6)
- * Club domestic league appearances and goals

Sonam Choden (born 16 May 2002) is a Bhutanese professional footballer who plays as a midfielder for the Bhutanese club Royal Thimphu College and the Bhutan women's national football team.

== Early life ==
Choden was born on 16 May 2002 in Bhutan. A native of Punakha, Bhutan, she has been nicknamed "Chungku".

== Club career ==
Choden started her career with Bhutanese side Gelephu Girls Academy. Following her stint there, she signed for Bhutanese side Mandala FC. In 2023, she signed for Bhutanese side Royal Thimphu College Women's FC, helping the club win the league title.

Two years later, she signed for Indian side Kickstart FC. Bhutanese news website WÒRDS FÒR YÒU wrote in 2025 that she "solidified her reputation as one of Bhutan’s brightest football talents".

== International career ==
Choden is a Bhutan international. During September 2023, she played for the Bhutan women's national football team at the 2023 SAFF Women's International Friendly Tournament.
