= 2022 SAFF Women's Championship =

Tournament details
- Host country: Nepal
- Dates: 6–19 September
- Teams: 7 (from 1 sub-confederation)
- Venue: 1 (in 1 host city)

Final positions
- Champions: Bangladesh (1st title)
- Runners-up: Nepal

Tournament statistics
- Matches played: 12
- Goals scored: 59 (4.92 per match)
- Attendance: 30,048 (2,504 per match)
- Top scorer(s): (Bangladesh) Sabina Khatun (8 goals)
- Best player: (Bangladesh) Sabina Khatun
- Best goalkeeper: (Bangladesh) Rupna Chakma
- Fair play award: Bangladesh

The 2022 SAFF Women's Championship was the 6th edition of the SAFF Women's Championship, the international women's football championship contested by the national teams of the South Asian Football Federation (SAFF). The tournament was played from 6–19 September 2022 in Kathmandu, Nepal.

In the final, Bangladesh played Nepal on 19 September 2022 at the Dasharath Rangasala Stadium in Kathmandu. Bangladesh won the final match 3–1, claiming their first SAFF title. Bangladeshi player Sabina Khatun was the tournament's best player, winning the Most Valuable Player award. Also, Sabina Khatun won the Top Scorer(s) award as she scored the most goals during the tournament with eight. Bangladesh's Rupna Chakma, with four clean sheets, won the Best Goalkeeper award, which is awarded to the goalkeeper with the most clean sheets.

== Participating teams ==
Apart from the hosts, Nepal, six other South Asian teams participated in the tournament. Pakistan would participate in the tournament after two editions.

Country	Appearance	Previous best performance	FIFA ranking Oct 2022
India	6th	Champions (2010, 2012, 2014, 2016, 2019)	61
Nepal (Host)	6th	Runners-up (2010, 2012, 2014, 2019)	103
Bangladesh	6th	Runners-up (2016)	140
Sri Lanka	6th	Semi-finals (2012, 2014, 2019)	155
Maldives	6th	Semi-finals (2016)	159
Bhutan	6th	Group stage (2010, 2012, 2014, 2016, 2019)	177
Pakistan	4th	Semi-finals (2010)	160

== Venue ==
Nepal was confirmed as the host for the 2022 SAFF Women's Championship at the SAFF Ordinary Congress on 2 July 2022.

Kathmandu
Dasharath Rangasala
Capacity: 18,000
2022 SAFF Women's Championship is located in Nepal

== Match officials ==
Referees

- (Bangladesh) Jaya Chakma
- (Bhutan) Choki Om
- (India) Ranjita Devi Tekcham
- (Nepal) Anjana Rai
- (Sri Lanka) Pabasara Minisarani

Assistant referees

- (Bangladesh) Salma Akter Moni
- (Bhutan) Choden Tshering
- (India) Riiohlang Dhar
- (Nepal) Radhika Shakya
- (Sri Lanka) Malika Madhushani

== Group stage ==
- All matches were played at Nepal.
- Times listed are UTC+05:45.

Key to colours in group tables
Group winners and runners-up advance to the semi-finals

=== Group A ===
Pos	Team	Pld	W	D	L	GF	GA	GD	Pts	Status
1	Bangladesh	3	3	0	0	12	0	+12	9	Qualified for Knockout stage
2	India	3	2	0	1	12	3	+9	6	Qualified for Knockout stage
3	Pakistan	3	1	0	2	7	9	−2	3	
4	Maldives	3	0	0	3	0	19	−19	0	

Source: Soccerway
Rules for classification: (1) points; (2) head-to-head points; (3) head-to-head goal difference; (4) goal difference; (5) number of goals scored; (6) drawing of lots
7 September
13:00

India	3–0	Pakistan
Maria 21' (o.g.); Grace 23'; Soumya 90+4'	Report

Dasharath Rangasala, Kathmandu
Attendance: 250
Referee: Yapa Y.A. Pabasara Minisarani (Sri Lanka)
7 September
17:30

Bangladesh	3–0	Maldives
Sabina 32', 40'; Masura 34'	Report

Dasharath Rangasala, Kathmandu
Attendance: 240
Referee: Anjana Rai (Nepal)

10 September
13:00

Pakistan	0–6	Bangladesh
	Report	Monika 3'; Shopna 28'; Sabina 31', 35', 59'; Ritu Chakma 77'

Dasharath Rangasala, Kathmandu
Attendance: 205
Referee: Choki Om (Bhutan)
10 September
17:30

Maldives	0–9	India
	Report	Tamang 24', 45+2', 85', 88'; Priyangka 42'; Grace 53', 86'; Guguloth 55'; Kashmina 84'

Dasharath Rangasala, Kathmandu
Attendance: 180
Referee: Anjana Rai (Nepal)

13 September
13:00

Maldives	0–7	Pakistan
	Report	Rameen 39'; Khadija 49' (pen.); Nadia 54', 78', 84', 90'; Anmol 90+5'

Dasharath Rangasala, Kathmandu
Attendance: 97
Referee: Yapa Y.A. Pabasara Minisarani (Sri Lanka)
13 September
17:30

India	0–3	Bangladesh
	Report	Shopna 12', 52'; Sarkar 22'

Dasharath Rangasala, Kathmandu
Attendance: 279
Referee: Choki Om (Bhutan)

=== Group B ===
Pos	Team	Pld	W	D	L	GF	GA	GD	Pts	Status
1	Nepal (H)	2	2	0	0	10	0	+10	6	Qualified for Knockout stage
2	Bhutan	2	1	0	1	5	4	+1	3	Qualified for Knockout stage
3	Sri Lanka	2	0	0	2	0	11	−11	0	

Source: Soccerway
Rules for classification: 1) points; 2) head-to-head points; 3) head-to-head goal difference; 4) goal difference; 5) number of goals scored; 6) drawing of lots
(H) Hosts
6 September
17:30

Bhutan	0–4	Nepal
	Report	Sabitra 12', 63'; Anita 73', 85'

Dasharath Rangasala, Kathmandu
Attendance: 2,710
Referee: Tekcham Ranjita Devi (India)

9 September
17:30

Sri Lanka	0–5	Bhutan
	Report	Dema 42'; Lhazom 50', 64'; Lhaden 85'; Wangmo 89'

Dasharath Rangasala, Kathmandu
Attendance: 172
Referee: Tekcham Ranjita Devi (India)

12 September
17:30

Nepal	6–0	Sri Lanka
Rashmi 9'; Saru 11'; Amrita 17'; Dipa 45+3'; Amisha 73', 90+3'	Report

Dasharath Rangasala, Kathmandu
Attendance: 2,650
Referee: Jaya Chakma (Bangladesh)

== Knockout stage ==
- Times listed are UTC+05:45.

=== Bracket ===
Semi-finals
16 September–Kathmandu
Bangladesh	8
Bhutan	0
16 September–Kathmandu
Nepal	1
India	0

Final
19 September–Kathmandu
Bangladesh	3
Nepal	1

=== Semi-finals ===
16 September 2022
13:00

Bangladesh	8–0	Bhutan
Shopna 2'; Sabina 18', 54', 90+3'; Sarkar 30'; Ritu Porna 35'; Masura 57'; Tohura 87'	Report

Dasharath Rangasala, Kathmandu
Attendance: 282
Referee: Tekcham Ranjita Devi (India)

16 September 2022
17:30

Nepal	1–0	India
Rashmi 45+1'	Report

Dasharath Rangasala, Kathmandu
Attendance: 7,253
Referee: Choki Om (Bhutan)

== Final ==
19 September 2022
17:00

Bangladesh	3–1	Nepal
Shamsunnahar Jr. 13'; Krishna 42', 77'	Report	Anita 70'

Dasharath Rangasala, Kathmandu
Attendance: 15,730
Referee: Tekcham Ranjita Devi (India)

== Winner ==
6th SAFF Women's Championship 2022

Bangladesh
First title

== Statistics ==
=== Goalscorers ===
There have been 59 goals scored in 12 matches, for an average of 4.92 goals per match.

8 goals

- (Bangladesh) Sabina Khatun

4 goals

- (Bangladesh) Mosammat Sirat Jahan Shopna
- (Bangladesh) Krishna Rani Sarkar
- (India) Anju Tamang
- (Pakistan) Nadia Khan

3 goals

- (India) Grace Dangmei
- (Nepal) Anita Basnet

2 goals

- (Bangladesh) Ritu Porna Chakma
- (Bangladesh) Masura Parvin
- (Bhutan) Deki Lhazom
- (India) Soumya Guguloth
- (Nepal) Sabitra Bhandari
- (Nepal) Amisha Karki
- (Nepal) Rashmi Kumari Ghising

1 goal

- (Bangladesh) Shamsunnahar Jr.
- (Bangladesh) Monika Chakma
- (Bangladesh) Tohura Khatun
- (Bhutan) Namgyel Dema
- (Bhutan) Tshering Lhaden
- (Bhutan) Galey Wangmo
- (India) Naorem Priyangka Devi
- (India) M. K. Kashmina
- (Nepal) Saru Limbu
- (Nepal) Amritra Jaishi
- (Nepal) Dipa Shahi
- (Pakistan) Rameen Fareed
- (Pakistan) Khadija Kazmi
- (Pakistan) Anmol Hira

1 own goal

- (Pakistan) Maria Khan (against India)

=== Awards ===
The following awards were given at the conclusion of the tournament. The Top scorers (top scorer), Most Valuable Player (best overall player) and Best Goalkeeper (goalkeeper with the most clean sheets) awards were given.

Most Valuable Player	Top scorer(s)	Best Goalkeeper	Fair Play Award
(Bangladesh) Sabina Khatun	(Bangladesh) Sabina Khatun (8 goals)	(Bangladesh) Rupna Chakma	Bangladesh

== See also ==
- 2022 AFC Women's Asian Cup
- 2022 AFF Women's Championship
- 2022 CAFA Women's Championship
- 2022 EAFF E-1 Football Championship (women)
- 2022 WAFF Women's Championship
- 2022 SAFF U-15 Women's Championship
- 2022 SAFF U-18 Women's Championship
