= Pema Choden Tshering =

Bhutanese footballer

Personal information
- Full name: Pema Choden Tshering
- Date of birth: 5 February 1996 (age 30)
- Place of birth: Thimphu, Bhutan
- Positions: Midfielder; forward

Team information
- Current team: Thimphu City F.C.

International career^{‡}
Years	Team	Apps	(Gls)
	Bhutan	26	(5)
- ‡ National team caps and goals as of 10 August 2025

Pema Choden Tshering is a Bhutanese footballer who plays as a forward for the Bhutan women's national football team and Thimphu City. She is currently the captain of Bhutan.

== Early life ==
She was born to Hishey Tshering, the president of Thimphu City FC.

== Career ==
She has served as head of women's football of Bhutan Football Federation. She was the first person to score a hat trick for Bhutan women's national team, in a 4-2 friendly win against Saudi Arabia.

== Style of play ==
She has been described as "an all-rounder player who plays in midfield".

== International goals ==
No.	Date	Venue	Opponent	Score	Result	Competition
1.	24 September 2022	Prince Sultan bin Abdul Aziz Stadium, Abha, Saudi Arabia	Saudi Arabia	1–0	3–3	Friendly
2.	28 September 2022	Prince Sultan bin Abdul Aziz Stadium, Abha, Saudi Arabia	Saudi Arabia	1–0	4–2	Friendly
3.	28 September 2022	Prince Sultan bin Abdul Aziz Stadium, Abha, Saudi Arabia	Saudi Arabia	2–0	4–2	Friendly
4.	28 September 2022	Prince Sultan bin Abdul Aziz Stadium, Abha, Saudi Arabia	Saudi Arabia	3–1	4–2	Friendly
5.	24 July 2024	Changlimithang Stadium, Thimphu, Bhutan	Bangladesh	1–0	1–5	Friendly
6.	24 October 2024	Dasarath Rangasala, Kathmandu, Nepal	Maldives	2–0	13–0	2024 SAFF Women's Championship
7.	24 October 2024	Dasarath Rangasala, Kathmandu, Nepal	Maldives	4–0	13–0	2024 SAFF Women's Championship
8.	10 July 2025	King Abdullah II Stadium, Amman, Jordan	Lebanon	1–0	2–1	2026 AFC Women's Asian Cup qualification
9.	10 July 2025	King Abdullah II Stadium, Amman, Jordan	Lebanon	2–1	2–1	2026 AFC Women's Asian Cup qualification
10.	9 April 2026	Changlimithang Stadium, Thimphu, Bhutan	Macau	4–0	7–0	Friendly
11.	9 April 2026	Changlimithang Stadium, Thimphu, Bhutan	Macau	5–0	7–0	Friendly
12.	9 April 2026	Changlimithang Stadium, Thimphu, Bhutan	Macau	6–0	7–0	Friendly
13.	28 May 2026	Jawaharlal Nehru Stadium, Margao, India	Sri Lanka	1–0	4–0	2026 SAFF Women's Championship
14.	28 May 2026	Jawaharlal Nehru Stadium, Margao, India	Sri Lanka	3–0	4–0	2026 SAFF Women's Championship
15.	28 May 2026	Jawaharlal Nehru Stadium, Margao, India	Sri Lanka	4–0	4–0	2026 SAFF Women's Championship

== Personal life ==
She enjoys reading.
