= Royal Thimphu College =

Private college in Thimphu, Bhutan

- ཐིམ་ཕུག་རྒྱལ་འཛིན་མཐོ་རིམ་སློབ་གྲྭ།
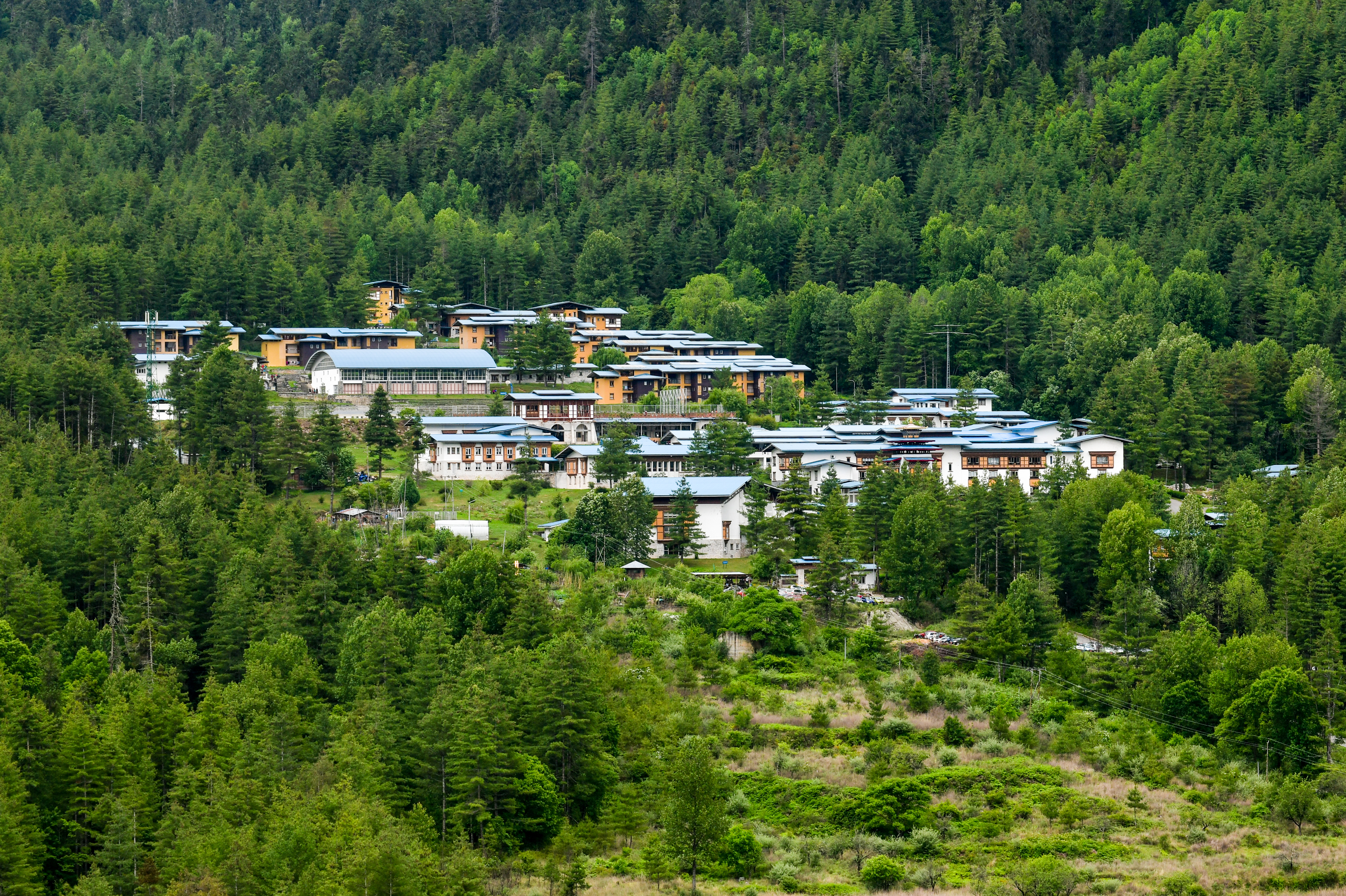
- Motto: Inspiring Education in Bhutan
- Type: Private college
- Established: 2009
- Parent institution: Royal University of Bhutan
- President: Tshewang Tandin
- Dean: Shivaraj Bhattarai
- Director: Tenzing Yonten
- Location: Thimphu
- Website: https://www.rtc.bt/

Royal Thimphu College is a private college in Thimphu, Bhutan under the Royal University of Bhutan. It is Bhutan's first private college.

The campus is located in an area of 25 acres of land in Ngabiphu, a rural area in Thimphu dzongkhag, located 7 km from the capital city of Thimphu. The college has a number of linkages with institutions of higher education abroad.

== History ==
The college was inaugurated on 18 July 2009 by Her Majesty, Ashi Kesang Choeden Wangchuck. It is affiliated to the Royal University of Bhutan, and offers undergraduate degrees in a variety of fields under the auspices of the University. Royal Thimphu College has since established a number of international partnerships, including with Wheaton College in the United States, the alma mater of the Fifth King of Bhutan, His Majesty Jigme Khesar Namgyel Wangchuck. In 2016, the College became the first in Bhutan to be accredited by the Bhutan Accreditation Council (BAC), which awarded it its highest grade of A+. The college was reaccredited with A+ in June 2023.

== Departments ==
Royal Thimphu College has several broad departments, namely the departments of business studies, social sciences, nursing and health sciences, information technology and mathematics, and the humanities. As an affiliated college of the Royal University of Bhutan, Royal Thimphu College offers a variety of RUB-prescribed majors in one or more of these departments. The majority of students belong to the business department. Other departments originally offered only double majors, although some single major degrees have since been introduced in the fields of English studies, nursing studies (Bachelor of Science) and environmental management. Of the many departments that the college offers, the nursing department is affiliated to Khesar Gyalpo University of Medical Sciences of Bhutan.

The college also fields men's and women's football teams that compete in the Bhutan Premier League and the Women's National League, respectively.

== Research grants ==
Royal Thimphu College has received many global grants. In 2016, the College was awarded the Institutional Development Grant from the Wenner-Gren Foundation for anthropological research based in the United States. The grant provided $125,000 for the college to support the development of capacity in the field of anthropology in the country. More recently it has received numerous substantial grants through the Erasmus Programme in Europe for projects to increase internationalization, foster entrepreneurship, and to build expertise in qualitative research as well as appreciation for its many uses.

== See also ==
- Royal Thimphu College Women's FC
