= Sri Lanka women's national football team =

Women's national association football team representing Sri Lanka

Sri Lanka
- Association: Football Federation of Sri Lanka
- Confederation: AFC (Asia)
- Sub-confederation: SAFF (South Asia)
- Head coach: Muhammad Jusmin
- Captain: Thushani Madhushika
- Top scorer: Praveena Perera (8)
- FIFA code: SRI
First colours	Second colours

FIFA ranking
- Current: 165 (20 October 2026)
- Highest: 101 (December 2013; December 2017)
- Lowest: 165 (June 2026)

First international
- India 8–1 Sri Lanka (Dhaka, Bangladesh; 29 January 2010)

Biggest win
- Bhutan 0–4 Sri Lanka (Colombo, Sri Lanka; 7 September 2010)

Biggest defeat
- Sri Lanka 0–16 Myanmar (Mandalay, Myanmar; 11 March 2015)

SAFF Championship
- Appearances: 8 (first in 2010)
- Best result: Semi-finals (2012, 2014, 2019)

The Sri Lanka women's national football team is the female representative football team for Sri Lanka. As of 2014 the national team has never entered qualifying for the FIFA Women's World Cup nor the AFC Women's Asian Cup.

The team has played in all three editions of the South Asian SAFF Women's Championship, where it reached the semi-finals in 2012 and 2014.

== History ==
Sri Lanka women's national football team played their first game in 2010 against India which they lost 8–1. Sri Lanka women's national football team had never played in FIFA Women's World Cup or AFC Women's Asian Cup nor entered the qualifications. They have played in the SAFF Women's Championship and in the South Asian Games. Due to their lack of experience they didn't show any great performance in the regional level of football. But they have qualified for the semi-finals of 2012 and 2014 SAFF Women's Championships.

Sri Lanka made their continental level football debut in the 2016 Summer Olympic Qualifiers when they were soundly beaten 16–0 by Myanmar. In the next game they were defeated by India. In 2016 they participated in the South Asian Games but lost all of their matches in the football tournament. Sri Lanka participated in the 4th SAFF Women's Championship in 2016 but they failed to reach the semi-finals after a shock defeat to Maldives which are ranked below them.

== Results and Fixtures ==
The following is a list of match results in the last 12 months, as well as any future matches that have been scheduled.

Legend

Win Draw Lose Fixture

=== 2026 ===
28 May 2026 2026 SAFF GS	Sri Lanka	0–4	Bhutan	Margao, Goa
16:30 SLST (UTC+5:30)		Report	Pema 27', 80', 83'; Lhazom 54'	Stadium: Jawaharlal Nehru Stadium; Attendance: 49; Referee: Anjana Rai (Nepal)

31 May 2026 2026 SAFF GS	Nepal	2–0	Sri Lanka	Margao, Goa
16:30 SLST (UTC+5:30)	Ghishing 45+3'; Nagarkote 62'	Report		Stadium: Jawaharlal Nehru Stadium; Attendance: 761; Referee: Ranjita Devi Tekcham (India)

7 June 2026 Friendly	Saudi Arabia	4–0	Sri Lanka	Bangkok, Thailand
19:00 UTC+7	Abdullah 24', 37'; Abu-Alsamh 26', 27'			Stadium: Windmill Football Club Stadium

== Coaching staff ==
=== Current coaching staff ===
As of 6 April 2025

Position	Name
Head coach	(Sri Lanka) Muhammad Jusmin
Assistant coach	(Sri Lanka) T. G. D. K. Samarasinghe (Sri Lanka) M. J, Mohamed Ratnam
Goalkeeper Coach	(Sri Lanka) Buddhika Sampath Bandara
Team manager	(Sri Lanka) Hithaishi Jayawardana
Physiotherapist	(Sri Lanka) Imalsha Udayanjalee
Masseur	(Sri Lanka) Nadeeshika Wijerathna

=== Manager history ===
- (Sri Lanka) Mohamed Hassan Roomy (2024-2024)
- (Sri Lanka) Muhammad Jusmin (2025-)

== Players ==
=== Current squad ===
- The following players were called up for the 2026 SAFF Women's Championship India.

No.	Pos.	Player	Date of birth (age)	Club
1	GK	Ashni Anuradhini		
22	GK	Tharushika Dilshani		(Football Federation of Sri Lanka) Blue Eagles SC
23	GK	Harshani Rupasinha		
2	DF	Y. Umasankavi		
3		Shashikala Rathnayaka		
4	DF	Rashmi Devindi		
5	DF	Sundararaja Viththiyalani		(Football Federation of Sri Lanka) Blue Eagles SC
14	DF	Sasidi Nimsara		
18	DF	Sivaneswaran Tharmika		
19	DF	Selvaraj Yuwarani	10 September 1997 (age 29)	(Football Federation of Sri Lanka) Blue Eagles SC
8	MF	Achala Sanjeewani Perera		
12	MF	Thushani Madushika		(Football Federation of Sri Lanka) Sea Hawks FC
13	MF	Parami Rajapaksha		
16		Tharidi Weliwita		
17	MF	Imesha Warnakulasyriya (Captain)		
20	MF	Lochani Sooriyaarachchi		
21	MF	Nawanjana Perera		(Football Federation of Sri Lanka) Sea Hawks FC
6		Shanika Somarathna		
7		Sanduni Sewmini		
9	FW	Paskaran Shanu	9 February 2000 (age 26)	
10	FW	Gagani Gayathma		(Football Federation of Sri Lanka) Blue Eagles SC
11	FW	J. Layansika		
15		Fathima Aathika Asfar		

=== Recent call-ups ===
The following footballers were part of a national selection in the past twelve months, but are not part of the current squad.

Pos.	Player	Date of birth (age)	Caps	Goals	Club	Latest call-up
GK	Ishanka Weerasinghe	1 December 1997 (age 28)		-		AFC Asian Cup qualification,June 2025
GK	Sakura Subasinghe	30 May 1995 (age 31)		-		AFC Asian Cup qualification,June 2025
GK	Dilki Sihara			-		AFC Asian Cup qualification,June 2025
DF	Maheshika Godawalage	13 August 1991 (age 35)		-		AFC Asian Cup qualification,June 2025
DF	Lakmini Silva			-		AFC Asian Cup qualification,June 2025
DF	Chamantha Francis			-		AFC Asian Cup qualification,June 2025
DF	Navanjana Perera			-		AFC Asian Cup qualification,June 2025 Template:Nat fs r break
MF	Kanchana			-		AFC Asian Cup qualification,June 2025
MF	Praveena Perera	6 July 1995 (age 31)		-		AFC Asian Cup qualification,June 2025
MF	Dilasha Dias	31 October 2000 (age 26)		-		AFC Asian Cup qualification,June 2025
MF	Achala Perera	3 January 1996 (age 30)		-		AFC Asian Cup qualification,June 2025
	Himaya de Silva			-		AFC Asian Cup qualification,June 2025
	Surenthiran Gowri			-	(Sri Lanka)	
^{INJ} Withdrew due to injury^{PRE} Preliminary squad / standby^{RET} Retired from the national team^{SUS} Serving suspension^{WD} Player withdrew from the squad due to non-injury issue.

=== Notable players ===
- Erandi Liyanage

== Head-to-head record ==
Key

Positive balance (more wins than losses)
Neutral balance (as many wins as losses)
Negative balance (more losses than wins)

Country	Matches	Win	Draw	Loss	GF	GA	GD	Win/Draw %	Confederation
Bahrain	3	0	0	3	1	9	−8	0	AFC
Bangladesh	4	1	0	3	3	7	−4	25	AFC
Bhutan	9	4	1	4	12	15	−3	44.44	AFC
India	8	0	0	8	1	45	−44	0	AFC
Laos	1	0	0	1	0	2	−2	0	AFC
Maldives	7	4	0	3	12	9	+3	57.14	AFC
Myanmar	1	0	0	1	0	16	−16	0	AFC
Nepal	10	0	0	10	0	44	−44	0	AFC
Pakistan	2	1	0	1	2	4	−2	50	AFC
Saudi Arabia	2	0	0	2	0	6	−6	0	AFC
Singapore	1	1	0	0	1	0	+1	100	AFC
Uzbekistan	1	0	0	1	0	10	−10	0	AFC

== Competitive record ==
=== FIFA Women's World Cup ===
FIFA Women's World Cup record									Qualification record						
Year	Result	GP	W	D	L	GS	GA	GD	GP	W	D	L	GS	GA	GD
(China) 1991 to (Germany) 2011	Did not exist								Did not exist						
(Canada) 2015 to (Australia) (New Zealand) 2023	Did not enter								Did not enter						
(Brazil) 2027	Did not qualify								Via AFC Women's Asian Cup						
(Costa Rica) (Jamaica) (Mexico) (United States) 2031	To be determined								To be determined						
(United Kingdom) 2035	To be determined								To be determined						
Total	0/10	–	–	–	–	–	–	–	–	–	–	–	–	–	–

=== Olympic Games ===
Summer Olympics record									Qualification record						
Year	Round	Pld	W	D*	L	GF	GA	GD	Pld	W	D*	L	GF	GA	GD
(United States) 1996 to (China) 2008	Did not exist								Did not exist						
(United Kingdom) 2012	Did not enter								Did not enter						
(Brazil) 2016	Did not qualify								2	0	0	2	0	20	−20
(Japan) 2020	Did not enter								Did not enter						
(France) 2024	Suspended by FIFA								Suspended by FIFA						
(United States) 2028	Did not qualify								Via AFC Women's Asian Cup						
(Australia) 2032	To be determined								To be determined						
Total	0/9	–	–	–	–	–	–	–	2	0	0	2	0	20	−20

*Denotes draws includes knockout matches decided on penalty kicks.

=== AFC Women's Asian Cup ===
AFC Women's Asian Cup record									Qualification record						
Hosts / Year	Result	GP	W	D*	L	GS	GA	GD	GP	W	D*	L	GS	GA	GD
(Hong Kong) 1975 to (China) 2010	Did not exist								Did not exist						
(Vietnam) 2014 to (India) 2022	Did not enter								Did not enter						
(Australia) 2026	Did not qualify								3	0	0	3	0	20	−20
(Uzbekistan) 2029	To be determined								To be determined						
Total	0/21	–	–	–	–	–	–	–	3	0	0	3	0	20	−20

*Denotes draws includes knockout matches decided on penalty kicks.

=== SAFF Women's Championship ===
SAFF Women's Championship record
Year	Result	GP	W	D*	L	GS	GA	GD
(Bangladesh) 2010	Group stage	3	0	1	2	1	10	−9
(Sri Lanka) 2012	Semi-final	4	2	0	2	6	9	−3
(Pakistan) 2014	Semi-final	4	2	0	2	5	9	−4
(India) 2016	Group stage	3	1	0	2	4	6	−2
(Nepal) 2019	Semi-final	3	1	0	2	2	9	−7
(Nepal) 2022	Group stage	2	0	0	2	0	11	−11
(Nepal) 2024	Group stage	3	1	0	2	2	10	−8
(India) 2026	Group stage	2	0	0	2	0	6	−6
Total	8/8	24	7	1	16	20	70	−50

*Denotes draws includes knockout matches decided on penalty kicks.

=== South Asian Games ===
South Asian Games record
Year	Position	Pld	W	D*	L	GF	GA	GD
(Bangladesh) 2010	5th	5	0	0	5	2	18	−16
(India) 2016	5th	4	0	0	4	2	13	−11
(Nepal) 2019	4th	3	0	0	3	1	9	−8
Total	3/3	12	0	0	12	5	40	−35

*Denotes draws includes knockout matches decided on penalty kicks.

== See also ==
- Sri Lanka national football team
- Sri Lanka national under-23 football team
- Sri Lanka national under-20 football team
- Sri Lanka national under-17 football team
