= Deki Lhazom =

Bhutanese footballer

Personal information
- Full name: Deki Lhazom
- Date of birth: 4 January 2004 (age 22)
- Place of birth: Trashigang, Bhutan
- Position: Forward

Team information
- Current team: RTC

Youth career
- 2017–2022: Gelephu Football Academy

Senior career*
Years	Team	Apps	(Gls)
2022–2023	Al-Ittihad	8	(2)
2021–2023	Gelephu Academy	24	(72)
2024–	RTC	53	(122)

International career^{‡}
2023	Bhutan U-20	4	(7)
2022–	Bhutan	34	(16)
Medal record
Women's Futsal
Representing Bhutan
SAFF Women's Futsal Championship
Bronze medal – third place	2026 Thailand
- * Club domestic league appearances and goals ‡ National team caps and goals as of 2 May 2026

Deki Lhazom is a Bhutanese professional women's footballer who plays as a forward for the Bhutan women's national team. She is the highest goal scorer of Bhutan's senior national team with 16 goals. She also plays for the Bhutan women's national futsal team.

== Club career ==
Lhazom began playing football at age eight. She was noticed by a district coach while playing for her school club. She was then invited to the 2017 Milo Cup before entering into the women's academy in Gelephu.

After impressing in senior international friendlies against Saudi Arabia, she was offered a contract with Al-Ittihad of the Saudi Women's Premier League. By joining the club, she became the first female Bhutanese player in history to play abroad. The Bhutan Football Federation reported that it was initially a one-year contract worth $3000 USD or about Nu. 240,000 per month.

== International career ==
Lhazom made her international debut at the 2017 SAFF U-15 Women's Championship. She went on to appear in every SAFF youth tournament through 2022. She scored against Nepal at the 2019 edition of the tournament. The goal helped Nepal secure its only point in the competition, ultimately failing to advance to the knockout rounds.

In December 2019, Lhazom was part of the under-15 national team that competed in a pair of friendlies away to Nepal. Lhazom scored her nation's only goal in the opening 1–6 defeat.

Lhazom made her senior international debut on 6 September 2022 against Nepal in the 2022 SAFF Women's Championship. Her first two senior international goals came against Sri Lanka on 10 September 2022 in the same competition. The match ended in a 5–0 victory. The result set several records for the team, including largest margin of victory and first win, multi-goal victory, and shutout in the tournament.

In September 2022, she scored a goal and impressed in a set of international friendlies away to Saudi Arabia.

== Career statistics ==
=== Club ===
Club	Season	Division	League		Continental		Others		Total	
Club	Season	Division	Apps	Goals	Apps	Goals	Apps	Goals	Apps	Goals
Al-Ittihad	2020-21	Saudi Women's Pro League	8	2					8	2
Gelaphu Academy	2021	Bhutan Women's League	1	2					1	2
Gelaphu Academy	2023	Bhutan Women's League	7	18			16	52	23	70
Gelaphu Academy	Total		8	20			16	52	24	72
RTC	2024	Bhutan Women's League	18	45	2	0			20	45
RTC	2025	Bhutan Women's League	17	54	3	1			20	55
RTC	2026	Bhutan Women's League	18	23	3	1			21	24
RTC	Total		53	122	8	2			61	124
Total career			69	144	8	2	16	52	93	198

=== International ===
As of match played 28 September 2022

Years	Apps	Goal
2022	5	3
2023		-
2024		10
2025		1
2026		2
Total	?	16

== International goals ==
=== Senior ===
Scores and results list Bhutan's goal tally first.

No.	Date	Venue	Opponent	Score	Result	Competition
1.	9 September 2022	Dasarath Rangasala, Kathmandu, Nepal	Sri Lanka	2–0	5–0	2022 SAFF Women's Championship
2.	9 September 2022	Dasarath Rangasala, Kathmandu, Nepal	Sri Lanka	3–0	5–0	2022 SAFF Women's Championship
3.	28 September 2022	Prince Sultan bin Abdul Aziz Stadium, Abha, Saudi Arabia	Saudi Arabia	4–1	4–2	Friendly
4.	27 July 2024	Changlimithang, Thimphu, Bhutan	Bangladesh	1–0	2–5	Friendly
5.	27 July 2024	Changlimithang, Thimphu, Bhutan	Bangladesh	2–0	2–5	Friendly
6.	21 October 2024	Dasarath Rangasala, Kathmandu, Nepal	Sri Lanka	1–0	4–1	2024 SAFF Women's Championship
7.	21 October 2024	Dasarath Rangasala, Kathmandu, Nepal	Sri Lanka	3–1	4–1	2024 SAFF Women's Championship
8.	24 October 2024	Dasarath Rangasala, Kathmandu, Nepal	Maldives	3–0	13–0	2024 SAFF Women's Championship
9.	24 October 2024	Dasarath Rangasala, Kathmandu, Nepal	Maldives	5–0	13–0	2024 SAFF Women's Championship
10.	24 October 2024	Dasarath Rangasala, Kathmandu, Nepal	Maldives	7–0	13–0	2024 SAFF Women's Championship
11.	24 October 2024	Dasarath Rangasala, Kathmandu, Nepal	Maldives	9–0	13–0	2024 SAFF Women's Championship
12.	24 October 2024	Dasarath Rangasala, Kathmandu, Nepal	Maldives	12–0	13–0	2024 SAFF Women's Championship
13.	29 October 2024	Dasarath Rangasala, Kathmandu, Nepal	Bangladesh	1–5	1–7	2024 SAFF Women's Championship
14.	13 July 2025	King Abdullah II Stadium, Amman, Jordan	Iran	1–3	1–7	2026 AFC Women's Asian Cup qualification
15.	9 April 2026	Changlimithang Stadium, Thimphu, Bhutan	Macau	2–0	7–0	Friendly
16.	28 May 2026	Jawaharlal Nehru Stadium, Margao, India	Sri Lanka	2–0	4–0	2026 SAFF Women's Championship
Last updated 9 April 2026

=== Youth ===
Scores and results list Bhutan's goal tally first.

No.	Date	Venue	Opponent	Score	Result	Competition
1.	13 October 2019	Changlimithang Stadium, Thimphu, Bhutan	Nepal	1–1	1–1	2019 SAFF U-15 Women's Championship
2.	23 December 2019	ANFA Complex, Lalitpur, Nepal	Nepal	1–2	1–6	Friendly
3.	8 March 2023	Petra Stadium, Amman, Jordan	Lebanon	2–5	2–6	2024 AFC U-20 Women's Asian Cup qualification
4.	12 March 2023	Petra Stadium, Amman, Jordan	Mongolia	1–0	4–0	2024 AFC U-20 Women's Asian Cup qualification
5.	12 March 2023	Petra Stadium, Amman, Jordan	Mongolia	2–0	4–0	2024 AFC U-20 Women's Asian Cup qualification
6.	12 March 2023	Petra Stadium, Amman, Jordan	Mongolia	3–0	4–0	2024 AFC U-20 Women's Asian Cup qualification
7.	12 March 2023	Petra Stadium, Amman, Jordan	Mongolia	4–0	4–0	2024 AFC U-20 Women's Asian Cup qualification
Last updated 23 March 2023
