= 2016 SAFF Women's Championship =

International women's football championship

Tournament details
- Host country: India
- Dates: 26 December 2016 – 4 January 2017
- Teams: 7
- Venue: 1 (in 1 host city)

Final positions
- Champions: India (4th title)
- Runners-up: Bangladesh

Tournament statistics
- Matches played: 12
- Goals scored: 57 (4.75 per match)
- Attendance: 117,662 (9,805 per match)
- Top scorer(s): (Nepal) Sabitra Bhandari (12 goals)
- Best player: (India) Indumathi Kathiresan
- Fair play award: Nepal

The 2016 SAFF Women's Championship was the 4th edition of the SAFF Women's Championship, the biennial international women's football championship contested by the national teams of the South Asian Football Federation (SAFF). The tournament began in India from 26 December 2016 and went on until 4 January 2017. The country was awarded hosting rights in January 2016. This was the first time India had hosted the SAFF Women's Championship.

The defending champions coming into the tournament were India, who won the three preceding tournaments. By the end of the tournament, India emerged as champions again, defeating Bangladesh in the final 3–1.

== Participating teams ==
Apart from the hosts, India, six other South Asian teams participated in the tournament. On 3 November 2016 it was announced that Pakistan would not participate in the tournament.

Country	Appearance	Previous best performance	FIFA ranking December 2016
India (Host)	4th	Champions (2010, 2012, 2014)	54
Afghanistan	4th	Semi-finals	n/a
Bangladesh	4th	Semi-finals	114
Bhutan	4th	Group-stage	n/a
Maldives	4th	Group-stage	116
Nepal	4th	Runners-up	105
Sri Lanka	4th	Semi-finals	115

== Venue ==
The Kanchenjunga Stadium in Siliguri, West Bengal served as the host venue for the SAFF Women's Championship.

Siliguri	2016 SAFF Women's Championship is located in India
Kanchenjunga Stadium	2016 SAFF Women's Championship is located in India
Capacity: 30,000	2016 SAFF Women's Championship is located in India

== Group stage ==
The group stage draw for the tournament was held on 17 November 2016 at the South Asian Football Federation head office in Dhaka.

=== Group A ===
Pos	Team	Pld	W	D	L	GF	GA	GD	Pts	Qualification
1	Nepal	3	3	0	0	18	0	+18	9	Advance to knockout stage
2	Maldives	3	2	0	1	8	12	−4	6	Advance to knockout stage
3	Sri Lanka	3	1	0	2	4	6	−2	3	
4	Bhutan	3	0	0	3	1	13	−12	0	

Source: Soccerway
Rules for classification: Tie-breaking criteria

26 December 2016
12:30 IST

Nepal	8–0	Bhutan
Bhandari 5', 9', 23', 35', 72', 77'; Sharmila Thapa 26'; Khatri 90'	Report

Kanchenjunga Stadium, Siliguri
Attendance: 1368
Referee: Monir Dhali (Bangladesh)

26 December 2016
16:30 IST

Sri Lanka	2–5	Maldives
Liyanage 43'; Kumudini 45+2'	Report	Rifa 24'; Zahir 27', 64', 80'; Shamila 88'

Kanchenjunga Stadium, Siliguri
Attendance: 2613
Referee: P.Singh (India)

28 December 2016
12:30 IST

Bhutan	0–2	Sri Lanka
	Report	Liyanage 60'; Perera 77'

Kanchenjunga Stadium, Siliguri
Attendance: 4064
Referee: Hanafi Zardan (Afghanistan)

28 December 2016
16:30 IST

Maldives	0–9	Nepal
	Report	Bhandari 12', 28', 39', 50', 63'; Yonjan 52'; Lama 71'; Bhujel 74'; BK 90+3'

Kanchenjunga Stadium, Siliguri
Attendance: 7462
Referee: Mizanur Rahman (Bangladesh)

30 December 2016
12:30 IST

Nepal	1–0	Sri Lanka
Gunawardane 87' (o.g.)	Report

Kanchenjunga Stadium, Siliguri
Attendance: 4830
Referee: Monir Dhali (Bangladesh)

30 December 2016
16:30 IST

Maldives	3–1	Bhutan
Zahir 18', 90'; Shamila 36'	Report	Ghalley 81'

Kanchenjunga Stadium, Siliguri
Attendance: 6701
Referee: P.Singh (India)

=== Group B ===
Pos	Team	Pld	W	D	L	GF	GA	GD	Pts	Qualification
1	Bangladesh	2	1	1	0	6	0	+6	4	Advance to knockout stage
2	India (H)	2	1	1	0	5	1	+4	4	Advance to knockout stage
3	Afghanistan	2	0	0	2	1	11	−10	0	

Source: Soccerway
Rules for classification: Tie-breaking criteria
(H) Hosts

27 December 2016
16:30 IST

India	5–1	Afghanistan
Kamala Devi 3', 32'; Mallik 29'; Dangmei 45+2'; Sanju 90+2'	Report	Muhtaj 88'

Kanchenjunga Stadium, Siliguri
Attendance: 20411
Referee: Mizanur Rahman (Bangladesh)

29 December 2016
16:30 IST

Bangladesh	6–0	Afghanistan
Sabina 6', 15', 40', 44', 48'; Shopna 85'	Report

Kanchenjunga Stadium, Siliguri
Attendance: 14310
Referee: Ismail Khan (Maldives)

31 December 2016
16:30 IST

India	0–0	Bangladesh
	Report

Kanchenjunga Stadium, Siliguri
Attendance: 10498
Referee: Hanafi Zardan (Afghanistan)

== Knockout stage ==
=== Bracket ===
Semi-finals
2 January
Nepal	1
India	3
2 January
Bangladesh	6
Maldives	0

Final
4 January
India	3
Bangladesh	1

=== Semi-finals ===
2 January 2017
12:30 IST

Nepal	1–3	India
Bhandari 75'	Report	Kamala Devi 45'; Indumathi 50'; Mallik 83'

Kanchenjunga Stadium, Siliguri
Attendance: 16478
Referee: Mizan Khandakar (Bangladesh)

2 January 2017
16:30 IST

Bangladesh	6–0	Maldives
Shopna 11', 22', 58'; Sabina 48', 64' (pen.); Nargis Khatun 52'	Report

Kanchenjunga Stadium, Siliguri
Attendance: 8464
Referee: P.Singh (India)

== Final ==
4 January 2017
16:30 IST

India	3–1	Bangladesh
Dangmei 12'; Mallik 60'; Indumathi 67'	Report	Shopna 40'

Kanchenjunga Stadium, Siliguri
Attendance: 20463
Referee: Ismail Khan (Maldives)

== Goalscorers ==
12 goals

- (Nepal) Sabitra Bhandari

8 goals

- (Bangladesh) Sabina Khatun

5 goals

- (Bangladesh) Sirat Jahan Shopna
- (Maldives) Fadhuwa Zahir

3 goals

- (India) Sasmita Malik
- (India) Yumnam Kamala Devi

2 goals

- (India) Grace Dangmei
- (India) Indumathi Kathiresan
- (Maldives) Aminath Shamila
- (Sri Lanka) Erandi Liyanage

1 goal

- (Afghanistan) Farkhunda Muhtaj
- (Bangladesh) Nargis Khatun
- (Bhutan) Tanka Maya Ghalley
- (India) Sanju Yadav
- (Maldives) Mariyam Rifa
- (Nepal) Sharmila Thapa
- (Nepal) Krishna Khatri
- (Nepal) Manjali Yonjan
- (Nepal) Sapana Lama
- (Nepal) Hira Kumari Bhujel
- (Nepal) Nirmala BK
- (Sri Lanka) Maheshika Kumudini
- (Sri Lanka) Praveena Perera

1 own goal

- (Sri Lanka) Rushani Gunawardena (playing against Nepal)
