= Nepal women's national football team results =

The Nepal women's national football team is controlled by the All Nepal Football Association and represents Nepal in women's international football competitions. It is a member of the Asian Football Confederation and the South Asian Football Federation and as of December 2023 had not qualified for the World Cup or an AFC Women's Asian Cup.

This is a list of the team's results since the earliest known records.

== 2020s ==
=== 2026 ===
25 May 2026 2026 SAFF GS	Bhutan	0–1	Nepal	Margao, Goa
16:30		Report	Rana 23'	Stadium: Jawaharlal Nehru Stadium; Referee: Tekcham Ranjita (India)

31 May 2026 2026 SAFF GS	Nepal	2–0	Sri Lanka	Margao, Goa
16:30	Ghishing 45+3'; Nagarkote 62'	Report		Stadium: Jawaharlal Nehru Stadium; Attendance: 761; Referee: Ranjita Devi Tekcham (India)

3 June 2026 2026 SAFF SF	Nepal	1–2	Bangladesh	Margao, Goa
16:00	Rana 22'	Report	R. Chakma 45+1'; Preeti Rai 90+3' (o.g.)	Stadium: Jawaharlal Nehru Stadium; Attendance: 289; Referee: Choki Om (Bhutan)

=== 2025 ===
17 February 2025 Vianet Championship GS	Nepal	1–0	Kyrgyzstan	Kathmandu, Nepal
17:30 UTC+5:45	Bimala Chaudhary 9'	Report		Stadium: Dasharath Rangasala; Attendance: 11,516; Referee: Kanika Barman (India); Player of the Match: Preeti Rai

20 February 2025 Vianet Championship GS	Lebanon	0–1	Nepal	Kathmandu, Nepal
17:30 UTC+5:45		Report	Bhandari 42'	Stadium: Dasharath Rangasala; Attendance: 11,473; Referee: Tekcham Ranjita Devi (India)

23 February 2025 Vianet Championship GS	Nepal	2–2	Myanmar	Kathmandu, Nepal
17:30 UTC+5:45	Rana Magar 11'; Bhandari 41'	Report	May Htet Lu 6'; Myat Noe Khin 17'	Stadium: Dasharath Rangasala; Attendance: 12,605; Player of the Match: Sabitra Bhandari

26 February 2025 Vianet Championship final	Myanmar	2–0	Nepal	Kathmandu, Nepal
17:30 UTC+5:45	Yu Par Khaing 61'; Win Theingi Tun 63'	Report		Stadium: Dasharath Rangasala; Attendance: 19,580

2 June Friendly	Thailand	2–0	Nepal	Pathum Thani, Thailand
	Chatchawan 59'; Jiraporn 73'			Stadium: Thammasat Stadium; Referee: Le Thi Ly (Vietnam)

29 June 2025 2026 AFC Asian Cup Q	Nepal	9–0	Laos	Tashkent, Uzbekistan
17:00 UTC+5	Basnet 12'; Bhandari 45', 55', 74', 79'; Limbu 47'; Ghising 57'; K.C. 83'; Inthaphone 88' (o.g.)	Report		Stadium: Milliy Stadium, Tashkent; Referee: Wint War Tun (Myanmar)

2 July 2025 2026 AFC Asian Cup Q	Sri Lanka	0–8	Nepal	Tashkent, Uzbekistan
17:00 UTC+5		Report	G. Rana 7', 55'; Bhandari 14', 36', 40'; Thokar 62'; Poudel 78'; P. Rana 89'	Stadium: Milliy Stadium, Tashkent; Referee: Wang Chieh (Chinese Taipei)

5 July 2025 2026 AFC Asian Cup Q	Uzbekistan	3–3 (4–2 p)	Nepal	Tashkent, Uzbekistan
20:00 UTC+5	Khabibullaeva 2'; Karachik 11'; Shoyimova 39'	Report	Bhandari 24', 73'; Rana 71'	Stadium: Milliy Stadium, Tashkent; Referee: Asaka Koizumi (Japan)
	Penalties
	Shoyimova (penalty scored); Zoirova (penalty scored); Khikmatova (penalty scored); Aminjonova (penalty scored)		(penalty missed) Bhandari; (penalty scored) Rana; (penalty scored) S. Magar; (penalty missed) A. Magar

24 October Friendly	Nepal	0–3	Iran	Shillong, India
18:00 UTC+5:30			Didar 49'; Ghanbari 52'; Behesht 57'	Stadium: Jawaharlal Nehru Stadium; Referee: Choki Om (Bhutan)

27 October Friendly	India	1–2	Nepal	Shillong, India
18:00 UTC+5:30	Shirvoikar 81'		Bhandari 2', 63'	Stadium: Jawaharlal Nehru Stadium; Referee: Pansa Chaisanit (Thailand)

29 October Unofficial friendly	India	1–1 (0–3 p)	Nepal	Gangtok, India
16:45 UTC+5:30	Guguloth 30'	Report	Ghising 45+2'	Stadium: Paljor Stadium; Referee: Meera Tamang (Bhutan)
	Penalties
	Priyadharshini (penalty missed); Santosh (penalty missed); Oraon (penalty missed)		S. Magar (penalty scored); Ghising (penalty scored); Basnet (penalty missed); Thokar (penalty scored)

26 November Friendly	Indonesia	2–1	Nepal	Yogyakarta, Indonesia
19:30 UTC+7	Gea 58'; Aulia 67'	Report	Vivi 20' (o.g.)	Stadium: Maguwoharjo Stadium

2 December Friendly	Nepal	0–1	Chinese Taipei	Yogyakarta, Indonesia
19:30 UTC+7		Report	Huang Ke-Sin 53'	Stadium: Maguwoharjo Stadium

=== 2024 ===
20 February 2024 2024 WAFF Women's Championship	Nepal	4–1	Syria	Jeddah, Saudi Arabia
17:00 UTC+3	Karki 9'; Basnet 12'; Bhandari 18'; Poudel 68'	Report	Mustafa 43'	Stadium: King Abdullah Sports City Reserve Stadium; Referee: Doumouh Al Bakkar (Lebanon)

22 February 2024 2024 WAFF Women's Championship	Iraq	0–5	Nepal	Jeddah, Saudi Arabia
17:00 UTC+3		Report	Bhandari 14', 15', 36', 43', 79'	Stadium: King Abdullah Sports City Reserve Stadium; Referee: Haneen Murad (Jordan)

24 February 2024 2024 WAFF Women's Championship	Palestine	0–4	Nepal	Jeddah, Saudi Arabia
20:00 UTC+3		Report	Bhandari 40', 78'; Poudel 59'; Rana 90+6' (pen.)	Stadium: King Abdullah Sports City Reserve Stadium; Referee: Ahmed Saad (Bahrain)

27 February 2024 2024 WAFF Championship SF	Nepal	2–1	Lebanon	Jeddah, Saudi Arabia
20:00 UTC+3	Bhandari 76'; Rai 90+4'	Report	P. Rana 37' (o.g.)	Stadium: Prince Abdullah Al-Faisal Sports City; Referee: Ahmed Saad (Bahrain)

29 February 2024 2024 WAFF Women's Championship F	Jordan	2–2 (5–3 p)	Nepal	Jeddah, Saudi Arabia
19:00 UTC+3	Feras 73'; Abu-Sabbah 89'	Report	Rana Magar 28'; G. Rana 90+2' (pen.)	Stadium: Prince Abdullah Al-Faisal Sports City; Referee: Mohamed Juma (Bahrain)
	Penalties
	Al-Majali (penalty scored); Jbarah (penalty scored); Zoqash (penalty scored); Abu-Sabbah (penalty scored); Fraij (penalty scored)		(penalty scored) G. Rana; (penalty scored) Shahi; (penalty scored) Kumari Bhujel; (penalty missed) Jaisi

18 October 2024 SAFF Championship GS	Bhutan	0–0	Nepal	Kathmandu, Nepal
17:30 UTC+5:45		Report		Stadium: Dasharath Rangasala; Attendance: 5,562; Referee: Y.A. Pabasara Minisaraniyapa (Sri Lanka)

21 October 2024 SAFF Championship GS	Nepal	11–0	Maldives	Kathmandu, Nepal
17:30 UTC+5:45	Preeti 5', 65', 87' (pen.); Sabita Rana Magar 29'; Rekha 32', 42', 48', 63', 78'; Anita KC 69'; Amisha Karki 88'	Report		Stadium: Dasharath Rangasala; Attendance: 6,671; Referee: Y.A. Pabasara Minisaraniyapa (Sri Lanka)

24 October 2024 SAFF Championship GS	Nepal	6–0	Sri Lanka	Kathmandu, Nepal
17:30 UTC+5:45		Report		Stadium: Dasharath Rangasala; Attendance: 7,617

27 October 2024 2024 SAFF W SF	Nepal	1–1 (4–2 p)	India	Kathmandu, Nepal
18:30	Bhandari 66'	Report	Basfore 62'	Stadium: Dashrath Stadium; Attendance: 18,009; Referee: Choki Om (Bhutan)
	Penalties
	Bhandari (penalty scored); Rana (penalty scored); Magar (penalty scored); Karki (penalty scored)		(penalty missed) Ashalata Devi; (penalty scored) Manisha; (penalty scored) Shirvoikar; (penalty missed) Ranjana Chanu

30 October 2024 2024 SAFF W F	Bangladesh	2–1	Nepal	Kathmandu, Nepal
17:45 BST (UTC+6)		Report		Stadium: Dasharath Rangasala; Attendance: 15,373

=== 2023 ===
15 February Friendly	India	2–2	Nepal	Chennai, India
19:30 UTC+5:30	Guguloth 56'; Kathiresan 68'	Report	Bhandari 90' (pen.), 90+2'	Stadium: Jawaharlal Nehru Stadium

18 February Friendly	India	0–0	Nepal	Chennai, India
19:30 UTC+5:30		Report		Stadium: Jawaharlal Nehru Stadium

5 April 2023 2024 AFC Olympic Qualifiers–Round 1	Nepal	1–5	Vietnam	Kathmandu, Nepal
18:00 UTC+5:45	Bhandari 80'	Report	Phạm Hải Yến 11'; Huỳnh Như 36' (pen.), 48'; Nguyễn Thị Bích Thùy 38'; Nguyễn Thị Thanh Nhã 90+1'	Stadium: Dasarath Stadium; Attendance: 2,715; Referee: Sunita Thongthawin (Thailand)

8 April 2023 2024 AFC Olympic Qualifiers Round 1	Vietnam	2–0	Nepal	Kathmandu, Nepal
18:00 UTC+5:45	Phạm Hải Yến 4', 7'	Report		Stadium: Dasarath Stadium; Referee: Oh Hyeon Jeong (South Korea)

13 July 2023 Friendly	Bangladesh	1–1	Nepal	Dhaka, Bangladesh
17:30 UTC+6	Khatun 66'	Report	Bhandari 90+1'	Stadium: Bir Sherestha Shaheed Shipahi Mostafa Kamal Stadium; Referee: Choki Om (Bhutan)

16 July 2023 Friendly	Bangladesh	0–0 (2–4 p)	Nepal	Dhaka, Bangladesh
00:00 BST (UTC+6)				Stadium: Bir Sherestha Shaheed Shipahi Mostafa Kamal Stadium

22 September 2022 Asian Games GS	Nepal	0–2	Vietnam	Wenzhou, China
--:-- UTC+8			Pham Hai Yen 53'; Nguyễn Thị Bích Thùy 64'	Stadium: Wenzhou Olympic Stadium

25 September 2022 Asian Games GS	Japan	8–0	Nepal	Wenzhou, China
--:-- UTC+8				Stadium: Wenzhou Olympic Stadium

28 September 2022 Asian Games GS	Bangladesh	1–1	Nepal	Wenzhou, China
--:-- UTC+8	Poudel 83'		Khatun 44'	Stadium: Wenzhou Olympic Stadium; Attendance: 3,304; Referee: Yu Hong (China)

Date	Opponent	Result	Score*	Venue	Competition
19 September 2022	Bangladesh	L	1–3	Dasharath Rangasala, Kathmandu, Nepal	2022 SAFF W Final
16 September 2022	India	W	1–0	Dasharath Rangasala, Kathmandu, Nepal	2022 SAFF W SF
12 September 2022	Sri Lanka	W	6–0	Dasharath Rangasala, Kathmandu, Nepal	2022 SAFF W GS
6 September 2022	Bhutan	W	4–0	Dasharath Rangasala, Kathmandu, Nepal	2022 SAFF W GS
21 September 2021	Hong Kong	D	0–0	JAR Stadium, Tashkent, Uzbekistan	2022 AFC Women's Asian Cup qualification
18 September 2021	Philippines	L	1–2	JAR Stadium, Tashkent, Uzbekistan	2022 AFC Women's Asian Cup qualification
12 September 2021	Bangladesh	D	0–0	Dasharath Rangasala, Kathmandu, Nepal	Friendly
9 September 2021	Bangladesh	W	2–1	Dasharath Rangasala, Kathmandu, Nepal	Friendly

== 2010s ==
Date	Opponent	Result	Score*	Venue	Competition
9 December 2019	India	L	0–2	Pokhara Rangashala, Pokhara, Nepal	2019 South Asian Games (final)
7 December 2019	India	L	0–1	Pokhara Rangashala, Pokhara, Nepal	2019 South Asian Games
5 December 2019	Maldives	W	3–0	Pokhara Rangashala, Pokhara, Nepal	2019 South Asian Games
3 December 2019	Sri Lanka	W	1–0	Pokhara Rangashala, Pokhara, Nepal	2019 South Asian Games
12 September 2019	Uzbekistan	L	2–3	Karakol, Kyrgyzstan	2019 Nadezhda Cup (final)
10 September 2019	Tajikistan	W	1–0	Karakol, Kyrgyzstan	2019 Nadezhda Cup
9 September 2019	Uzbekistan	L	0–2	Karakol, Kyrgyzstan	2019 Nadezhda Cup
8 September 2019	Kyrgyzstan	W	8–2	Karakol, Kyrgyzstan	2019 Nadezhda Cup
9 April 2019	Indonesia	W	2–1	Bahtoo Stadium, Mandalay, Myanmar	2020 AFC Women's Olympic Qualifying Tournament (second round)
6 April 2019	India	L	1–3	Mandalarthiri Stadium, Mandalay, Myanmar	2020 AFC Women's Olympic Qualifying Tournament (second round)
3 April 2019	Myanmar	L	1–3	Mandalarthiri Stadium, Mandalay, Myanmar	2020 AFC Women's Olympic Qualifying Tournament (second round)
22 March 2019	India	L	1–3	Sahid Rangashala, Biratnagar, Nepal	2019 SAFF Women's Championship (final)
20 March 2019	Sri Lanka	W	4–0	Sahid Rangashala, Biratnagar, Nepal	2019 SAFF Women's Championship
16 March 2019	Bangladesh	W	3–0	Sahid Rangashala, Biratnagar, Nepal	2019 SAFF Women's Championship
12 March 2019	Bhutan	W	3–0	Sahid Rangashala, Biratnagar, Nepal	2019 SAFF Women's Championship
15 February 2019	Myanmar	L	1–3	Kalinga Stadium, Bhubaneswar, India	2019 Women's Gold Cup (final)
13 February 2019	Iran	W	3–0	Kalinga Stadium, Bhubaneswar, India	2019 Women's Gold Cup
11 February 2019	India	W	2–1	Kalinga Stadium, Bhubaneswar, India	2019 Women's Gold Cup
9 February 2019	Myanmar	L	0–3	Kalinga Stadium, Bhubaneswar, India	2019 Women's Gold Cup
13 November 2018	Bangladesh	D	1–1	Thuwunna Stadium, Yangon, Myanmar	2020 AFC Women's Olympic Qualifying Tournament (first round)
11 November 2018	Myanmar	D	1–1	Thuwunna Stadium, Yangon, Myanmar	2020 AFC Women's Olympic Qualifying Tournament (first round)
8 November 2018	India	D	1–1	Thuwunna Stadium, Yangon, Myanmar	2020 AFC Women's Olympic Qualifying Tournament (first round)
31 October 2018	(China) Beijing BG Phoenix F.C.	L	1–2	Xiannongtan Stadium, Beijing, China	Exhibition match
30 October 2018	(China) Beijing Sport University	W	3–0	Xiannongtan Stadium, Beijing, China	Exhibition match
29 October 2018	(China) Beijing BG Phoenix F.C.	L	1–4	Xiannongtan Stadium, Beijing, China	Exhibition match
24 May 2017	Malaysia	L	1–4	UMS Stadium, Kota Kinabalu, Malaysia	Exhibition match (International friendly)
22 May 2017	Malaysia	D	1–1	Likas Stadium, Kota Kinabalu, Malaysia	Exhibition match (International friendly)
2 January 2017	India	L	1–3	Kanchenjunga Stadium, Siliguri, India	2016 SAFF Women's Championship
31 December 2016	Sri Lanka	W	1–0	Kanchenjunga Stadium, Siliguri, India	2016 SAFF Women's Championship
28 December 2016	Maldives	W	9–0	Kanchenjunga Stadium, Siliguri, India	2016 SAFF Women's Championship
26 December 2016	Bhutan	W	8–0	Kanchenjunga Stadium, Siliguri, India	2016 SAFF Women's Championship
17 December 2016	Malaysia	W	1-0	ANFA Complex, Satdobato, Lalitpur, Nepal	Exhibition match (International friendly)
15 February 2016	India	L	0–4	Jawaharlal Nehru Stadium (Shillong), Shillong, India	2016 South Asian Games (final)
13 February 2016	Sri Lanka	W	4–0	Jawaharlal Nehru Stadium (Shillong), Shillong, India	2016 South Asian Games
11 February 2016	India	D	0–0	Jawaharlal Nehru Stadium (Shillong), Shillong, India	2016 South Asian Games
7 February 2016	Maldives	W	2–0	Jawaharlal Nehru Stadium (Shillong), Shillong, India	2016 South Asian Games
5 February 2016	Bangladesh	W	3–0	Jawaharlal Nehru Stadium (Shillong), Shillong, India	2016 South Asian Games
21 November 2014	India	L	0–6	Jinnah Stadium, Islamabad, Pakistan	2014 SAFF Women's Championship (final)
19 November 2014	Bangladesh	W	1–0	Jinnah Stadium, Islamabad, Pakistan	2014 SAFF Women's Championship
16 November 2014	Sri Lanka	W	3–0	Jinnah Stadium, Islamabad, Pakistan	2014 SAFF Women's Championship
14 November 2014	Pakistan	W	2–0	Jinnah Stadium, Islamabad, Pakistan	2014 SAFF Women's Championship
12 November 2014	Bhutan	W	8–0	Jinnah Stadium, Islamabad, Pakistan	2014 SAFF Women's Championship
26 October 2013	Qatar	W	3–0	Grand Hamad Stadium, Doha, Qatar	Exhibition match (International friendly)
24 October 2013	Qatar	W	6–0	Grand Hamad Stadium, Doha, Qatar	Exhibition match (International friendly)
8 January 2013	Kuwait	W	8–0	Mohammed Al-Hamad Stadium, Kuwait City, Kuwait	Exhibition match (International friendly)
16 September 2012	India	L	1–3	CR & FC Grounds, Colombo, Sri Lanka	2012 SAFF Women's Championship (final)
14 September 2012	Sri Lanka	W	3–0	CR & FC Grounds, Colombo, Sri Lanka	2012 SAFF Women's Championship
12 September 2012	Afghanistan	W	7–1	CR & FC Grounds, Colombo, Sri Lanka	2012 SAFF Women's Championship
10 September 2012	Maldives	W	5–0	CR & FC Grounds, Colombo, Sri Lanka	2012 SAFF Women's Championship
8 September 2012	Pakistan	W	8–0	CR & FC Grounds, Colombo, Sri Lanka	2012 SAFF Women's Championship
23 December 2010	India	L	0–1	Cox’s Bazar Stadium, Cox's Bazar, Bangladesh	2010 SAFF Women's Championship
21 December 2010	Bangladesh	W	3–0	Cox’s Bazar Stadium, Cox's Bazar, Bangladesh	2010 SAFF Women's Championship
18 December 2010	Pakistan	W	12–0	Cox’s Bazar Stadium, Cox's Bazar, Bangladesh	2010 SAFF Women's Championship
14 December 2010	Afghanistan	W	13–0	Cox’s Bazar Stadium, Cox's Bazar, Bangladesh	2010 SAFF Women's Championship
12 December 2010	Maldives	W	6–0	Cox’s Bazar Stadium, Cox's Bazar, Bangladesh	2010 SAFF Women's Championship
8 February 2010	India	L	1–3	Bangabandhu National Stadium, Dhaka, Bangladesh	2010 South Asian Games
6 February 2010	Pakistan	W	7–0	Bangabandhu National Stadium, Dhaka, Bangladesh	2010 South Asian Games
4 February 2010	India	L	0–5	Bangabandhu National Stadium, Dhaka, Bangladesh	2010 South Asian Games
2 February 2010	Sri Lanka	W	8–0	Bangabandhu National Stadium, Dhaka, Bangladesh	2010 South Asian Games
29 January 2010	Bangladesh	W	1–0	Bangabandhu National Stadium, Dhaka, Bangladesh	2010 South Asian Games

== 2000s ==
The team did not play any competitive matches between 2000 and 2010.

== 1990s ==
Date	Opponent	Result	Score*	Venue	Competition
16 November 1999	Uzbekistan	L	1–6	Panaad Stadium, Bacolod City, Philippines	1999 AFC Women's Championship
12 November 1999	Japan	L	0–14	Panaad Stadium, Bacolod City, Philippines	1999 AFC Women's Championship
10 November 1999	Thailand	L	0–5	Iloilo Sports Complex, Iloilo City, Philippines	1999 AFC Women's Championship
8 November 1999	Philippines	L	0–5	Iloilo Sports Complex, Iloilo City, Philippines	1999 AFC Women's Championship

== 1980s ==
Date	Opponent	Result	Score*	Venue	Competition
24 December 1989	Japan	L	0–14	Hong Kong Stadium, So Kon Po, Hong Kong	1989 AFC Women's Championship
22 December 1989	Indonesia	L	0–8	Hong Kong Stadium, So Kon Po, Hong Kong	1989 AFC Women's Championship
18 December 1989	Hong Kong	L	0–3	Hong Kong Stadium, So Kon Po, Hong Kong	1989 AFC Women's Championship
19 December 1986	Indonesia	L	0–6	Hong Kong Stadium, So Kon Po, Hong Kong	1986 AFC Women's Championship
17 December 1986	Thailand	L	0–5	Hong Kong Stadium, So Kon Po, Hong Kong	1986 AFC Women's Championship
14 December 1986	Hong Kong	L	0–1	Hong Kong Stadium, So Kon Po, Hong Kong	1986 AFC Women's Championship

* Nepal score always listed first

Win Draw Loss

== Competitive record ==
*Draws include knockout matches decided on penalty kicks.
***Red border colour indicates tournament was held on home soil.

=== Women's World Cup ===
FIFA Women's World Cup
Year	Result	Pld	W	D*	L	GF	GA	GD	Pts
(China) 1991	Did not qualify								
(Sweden) 1995	Did not qualify								
(United States) 1999	Did not qualify								
(United States) 2003	Did not qualify								
(China) 2007	Did not qualify								
(Germany) 2011	Did not qualify								
(Canada) 2015	Did not qualify								
(France) 2019	Did not qualify								
(Australia) (New Zealand) 2023	Did not qualify								
(Brazil) 2027	To be determined								
Total	-	-	-	-	-	-	-	-	-

=== AFC Women's Asian Cup ===
AFC Women's Asian Cup
Year	Result	Pld	W	D*	L	GF	GA	GD	Pts
(Hong Kong) 1975	Did not enter (No team)								
(Taiwan) 1977	Did not enter (No team)								
(India) 1979	Did not enter (No team)								
(Hong Kong) 1981	Did not enter (No team)								
(Thailand) 1983	Did not enter (No team)								
(Hong Kong) 1986	Round 1	3	0	0	3	0	12	-12	0
(Hong Kong) 1989	Round 1	3	0	0	3	0	25	-25	0
(Japan) 1991	Did not enter								
(Malaysia) 1993	Did not enter								
(Malaysia) 1995	Did not enter								
(China) 1997	Did not enter								
(Philippines) 1999	Round 1	4	0	0	4	1	30	-29	0
(Chinese Taipei) 2001	Did not enter								
(Thailand) 2003	Did not enter								
(Australia) 2006	Did not enter								
(Vietnam) 2008	Did not enter								
(China) 2010	Did not enter								
(Vietnam) 2014	Did not enter								
(Jordan) 2018	Did not enter								
(India) 2022	Did not qualify								
(Australia) 2026	To be determined								
Total	3/20	10	0	0	10	1	67	-66	0

=== SAFF Women's Championship ===
SAFF Women's Championship
Year	Result	Pld	W	D*	L	GF	GA	GD	Pts
(Bangladesh) 2010	Runners-up	5	4	0	1	34	1	+33	12
(Sri Lanka) 2012	Runners-up	5	4	0	1	24	4	+20	12
(Pakistan) 2014	Runners-up	5	4	0	1	17	6	+11	12
(India) 2016	Semi Final	4	3	0	1	19	3	+16	9
(Nepal) 2019	Runners-up	4	3	0	1	11	3	+8	9
(Nepal) 2022	Runners-up	4	3	0	1	12	1	+11	9
(Nepal) 2024	Runners-up	5	3	1	1	19	3	+16	10
(India) 2026	Qualified								
Total	7/7	32	24	1	7	136	21	+115	73

=== Olympic Games ===
Summer Olympics record										Qualification record						
Year	Round	Pos	Pld	W	D	L	GF	GA	Squad	Outcome	Pld	W	D	L	GF	GA
(United States) 1996	Did not enter									The 1995 FIFA Women's World Cup served as the qualifying tournament						
(Australia) 2000	Did not enter									The 1999 FIFA Women's World Cup served as the qualifying tournament						
(Greece) 2004	Did not enter									Did not enter						
(China) 2008	Did not enter									Did not enter						
(United Kingdom) 2012	Did not enter									Did not enter						
(Brazil) 2016	Did not enter									Did not enter						
(Japan) 2020	Did not qualify									2nd of 3	6	1	3	2	7	10
(France) 2024	Did not qualify									3rd of 3	2	0	0	2	1	7
(United States) 2028	To be determined									To be determined						
Total	–	0/8	–	–	–	–	–	–	–	Total	8	1	3	4	7	17

=== Asian Games ===
Asian Games
Year	Result	Pld	W	D	L	GF	GA	GD	Pts
(China) 1990	Did not enter								
(Japan) 1994	Did not enter								
(Thailand) 1998	Did not enter								
(South Korea) 2002	Did not enter								
(Qatar) 2006	Did not enter								
(China) 2010	Did not enter								
(South Korea) 2014	Did not enter								
(Indonesia) 2018	Did not enter								
(China) 2022	Group Stage	3	0	1	2	1	11	-10	1
Total	-	-	-	-	-	-	-	-	-

=== South Asian Games ===
South Asian Games
Year	Result	Pld	W	D*	L	GF	GA	GD	Pts
(Bangladesh) 2010	Silver	5	3	0	2	17	9	+8	9
(India) 2016	Silver	5	3	1	1	9	4	+5	10
(Nepal) 2019	Silver	4	2	0	2	4	3	+1	6
(Pakistan) 2027	TBD								
Total	3/3	14	8	1	5	30	16	+14	25

== See also ==
- Nepal national football team results
