= 2024 WAFF Women's Championship squads =

List of squads of the 2024 WAFF Women's Championship

The 2024 WAFF Women's Championship is an international women's association football tournament held in Saudi Arabia from 18 until 28 February 2024. The 8 national teams involved in the tournament were required to register a squad of 23 players, including three goalkeepers. Only players in these squads were eligible to take part in the tournament.

The age listed for each player is on 19 February 2024, the first day of the tournament. The club listed is the club for which the player last played a competitive match before the tournament. A flag is included for coaches who are of a different nationality than their own national team.

== Group A ==
=== Saudi Arabia ===
Head coach: (Spain) Lluís Cortés

The final 23-player squad was announced on 7 February 2024. On 11 February 2024, Al Jawharah Saud was withdrawn from the squad due to injury and was replaced by Noura Ibrahim.

| No. | Pos. | Player | Date of birth (age) | Club |
|---|---|---|---|---|
| 1 | GK | Sara Khalid | 2 August 1996 (aged 27) | (Saudi Arabia) Al Nassr |
| 2 | DF | Bayan Sadagah (captain) | 15 November 1994 (aged 29) | (Saudi Arabia) Al-Ittihad |
| 3 | DF | Leen Mohammed | 22 March 2003 (aged 20) | (Saudi Arabia) Al-Shabab |
| 4 | DF | Talah Al-Ghamdi | 18 November 1999 (aged 24) | (Saudi Arabia) Al-Ittihad |
| 5 | MF | Lana Abdulrazak | 22 May 2005 (aged 18) | (Saudi Arabia) Al-Ittihad |
| 6 | MF | Athaa Fahad | 13 March 1996 (aged 27) | (Saudi Arabia) Al-Shabab |
| 7 | FW | Mubarkh Al-Saiari | 19 December 1998 (aged 25) | (Saudi Arabia) Al Nassr |
| 8 | MF | Sara Hamad | 27 June 1992 (aged 31) | (Saudi Arabia) Al Nassr |
| 9 | FW | Al Bandari Mobarak | 9 December 2001 (aged 22) | (Saudi Arabia) Al-Shabab |
| 10 | MF | Seba Tawfiq | 13 January 2005 (aged 19) | (Saudi Arabia) Al-Ittihad |
| 11 | FW | Fatimah Mansour | 10 December 2007 (aged 16) | (Saudi Arabia) Al-Shabab |
| 12 | DF | Shuruq Al-Hwsawi | 25 November 1994 (aged 29) | (Saudi Arabia) Al Hilal |
| 13 | MF | Hala Khashoggi | 11 October 1999 (aged 24) | (Saudi Arabia) Al-Ittihad |
| 14 | FW | Joury Tarek | 13 March 2003 (aged 20) | (Saudi Arabia) Al-Ittihad |
| 15 | MF | Moudi Abdulmohsen | 20 September 2001 (aged 22) | (Saudi Arabia) Al-Shabab |
| 16 | FW | Moluk Al-Hawsawi | 10 January 2005 (aged 19) | (Saudi Arabia) Al-Ahli |
| 17 | FW | Haya Maher | 30 August 2001 (aged 22) | (Saudi Arabia) Al Qadsiah |
| 18 | FW | Noura Ibrahim | 17 September 1998 (aged 25) | (Saudi Arabia) Al-Shabab |
| 19 | DF | Nouf Saud | 7 November 2000 (aged 23) | (Saudi Arabia) Al Hilal |
| 20 | GK | Mona Abdulrahman | 27 October 1996 (aged 27) | (Saudi Arabia) Al-Shabab |
| 21 | GK | Reem Al-Beloshi | 21 January 2001 (aged 23) | (Saudi Arabia) Al Nassr |
| 22 | FW | Abeer Nasser | 14 September 1998 (aged 25) | (Saudi Arabia) Al-Shabab |
| 23 | DF | Raghad Mukhayzin | 24 October 1996 (aged 27) | (Saudi Arabia) Al-Ahli |

=== Guam ===
Head coach: Kristin Thompson

The final 23-player squad was announced on 13 February 2024.

| No. | Pos. | Player | Date of birth (age) | Club |
|---|---|---|---|---|
| 1 | GK | Isabella Hara | 10 September 2002 (aged 21) | |
| 2 | MF | Emily Walton | 11 January 2002 (aged 22) | |
| 3 | DF | Mihaela Perez | 13 August 2002 (aged 21) | |
| 4 | DF | Samantha Kenney | 18 January 2004 (aged 20) | |
| 5 | GK | Yasmeen Lopez | | |
| 6 | MF | True Dydasco | 11 December 1998 (aged 25) | |
| 7 | DF | Kaia Malakooti | 13 April 2004 (aged 19) | |
| 8 | MF | Rebecca Bartosh | 4 October 2000 (aged 23) | (Italy) Roma CF |
| 9 | MF | Jenae Perez | 13 August 2002 (aged 21) | |
| 10 | DF | Maile Chargualaf | | |
| 11 | MF | Jenna Merrill | 22 April 1992 (aged 31) | |
| 12 | MF | Inyssa Perez | 22 July 1994 (aged 29) | |
| 13 | FW | Analea Meno | 5 July 2006 (aged 17) | |
| 14 | FW | Camryn Cruz | | |
| 15 | FW | Mariah Anaya | 10 October 1999 (aged 24) | |
| 16 | DF | Kalle Damian | | |
| 17 | DF | Aida-Rose Pedemonte | | |
| 18 | GK | Gabrielle Moser | 22 June 2005 (aged 18) | |
| 19 | FW | Lexi Taitague | 2 February 2006 (aged 18) | |
| 20 | MF | Kaia Villanueva | 15 June 2007 (aged 16) | |
| 21 | GK | Sierra Ruehl | 27 September 2007 (aged 16) | |
| 22 | DF | Sophia San Agustin | 22 September 2004 (aged 19) | |
| 23 | MF | Aryanna Sanchez | | |

=== Lebanon ===
Head coach: Wael Gharzeddine

The final 23-player squad was announced on 17 February 2024.

| No. | Pos. | Player | Date of birth (age) | Caps | Goals | Club |
|---|---|---|---|---|---|---|
| 1 | GK | Lamitta El Dib | 2 September 2005 (aged 18) | 10 | 0 | (Lebanon) EFP |
| 2 | DF | Julie Atallah | 28 July 2005 (aged 18) | 9 | 0 | (Lebanon) SAS |
| 3 | DF | Karly Harfouche | 3 August 2004 (aged 19) | 2 | 0 | (Lebanon) SAS |
| 4 | DF | Amina Karime | 20 December 2005 (aged 18) | 14 | 0 | (Lebanon) BFA |
| 5 | DF | Waed Raed | 9 November 2006 (aged 17) | 17 | 1 | (Lebanon) SAS |
| 6 | DF | Ayana Rezkalla | 21 April 2008 (aged 15) | 1 | 0 | (Lebanon) EFP |
| 7 | FW | Samira Awad | 30 June 2000 (aged 23) | 23 | 5 | (Lebanon) SAS |
| 8 | DF | Rana Al Mokdad | 18 November 1998 (aged 25) | 25 | 1 | (Lebanon) SAS |
| 9 | MF | Syntia Salha | 12 January 2003 (aged 21) | 22 | 6 | (Lebanon) BFA |
| 10 | FW | Lili Iskandar | 16 May 2002 (aged 21) | 20 | 9 | (Saudi Arabia) Al-Ittihad |
| 11 | FW | Angelina Saade | 23 June 2006 (aged 17) | 3 | 0 | (Lebanon) BFA |
| 12 | MF | Nathalie Matar (captain) | 20 September 1995 (aged 28) | 22 | 0 | (France) USPSO |
| 13 | DF | Lara Bou Hamra | 16 February 2004 (aged 20) | 6 | 0 | (Lebanon) BFA |
| 14 | FW | Christy Maalouf | 20 December 2005 (aged 18) | 17 | 8 | (France) Paris FC 2 |
| 15 | DF | Dima Al Kasti | 13 December 2001 (aged 22) | 19 | 4 | (Lebanon) SAS |
| 16 | MF | Stephanie El Kazzi | 29 September 2004 (aged 19) | 10 | 0 | (Lebanon) EFP |
| 17 | MF | Cecile Iskandar | 12 March 2007 (aged 16) | 5 | 1 | (Lebanon) SAS |
| 18 | FW | Hanin Tamim | 5 April 2000 (aged 23) | 19 | 8 | (Lebanon) SAS |
| 19 | MF | Yara Bou Rada | 7 August 2000 (aged 23) | 23 | 2 | (Lebanon) EFP |
| 20 | MF | Christina Tikle | 31 August 2004 (aged 19) | 2 | 0 | (Lebanon) BFA |
| 21 | GK | Clara Khalil | 28 May 2004 (aged 19) | 2 | 0 | (Lebanon) Helium |
| 22 | MF | Zahwa Arabi | 2 November 2005 (aged 18) | 16 | 2 | (Lebanon) EFP |
| 23 | GK | Marcelle Skaiki | 1 February 2007 (aged 17) | 0 | 0 | (Lebanon) Super Girls |

=== Jordan ===
Head coach: Maher Abu Hantash

The final 23-player squad was announced on 8 February 2024.

| No. | Pos. | Player | Date of birth (age) | Club |
|---|---|---|---|---|
| 1 | GK | Sherin Al-Shalabe | 3 June 1994 (aged 29) | (Jordan) Etihad |
| 2 | DF | Haya Khalil | 12 September 1994 (aged 29) | (Saudi Arabia) Al-Taqadom |
| 3 | DF | Alanoud Al-Zabrey | 18 May 1999 (aged 24) | (Jordan) |
| 4 | DF | Alia Hasan | | (Jordan) Al-Nasser |
| 5 | FW | Tala Al-Barghouthi | 11 April 2002 (aged 21) | (Jordan) Amman |
| 6 | MF | Razan Al-Zagha | 23 March 1995 (aged 28) | (Jordan) |
| 7 | DF | Nour Zoqash | 1 September 1999 (aged 24) | (Jordan) Etihad |
| 8 | MF | Enas Al-Jamaeen | 11 November 2003 (aged 20) | (Jordan) Etihad |
| 9 | FW | Bana Al-Bitar | 6 October 1996 (aged 27) | (Saudi Arabia) Jeddah |
| 10 | FW | Mai Sweilem | 25 September 1995 (aged 28) | (Saudi Arabia) Al-Shabab |
| 11 | FW | Maysa Jbarah | 20 September 1989 (aged 34) | (Saudi Arabia) Al Nassr |
| 12 | GK | Rawand Kassab | 6 November 2003 (aged 20) | (Saudi Arabia) Al-Ahli |
| 13 | FW | Leen Al-Btoush | 20 July 2001 (aged 22) | (Saudi Arabia) Neom |
| 14 | FW | Lina Al-Saheb | 18 August 1996 (aged 27) | (Jordan) |
| 15 | FW | Sarah Abu-Sabbah | 27 October 1999 (aged 24) | (Germany) 1. FC Union Berlin |
| 16 | MF | Zaina Hazem | 8 July 2004 (aged 19) | (Jordan) Etihad |
| 17 | MF | Rouzbahan Fraij | 7 April 2000 (aged 23) | (Jordan) Al-Ahli |
| 18 | MF | Yasmine Al-Ajrab | | (Jordan) |
| 19 | DF | Ayah Al-Majali | 9 March 1992 (aged 31) | (Saudi Arabia) Al-Ahli |
| 20 | DF | Lana Feras | 1 June 1998 (aged 25) | (Saudi Arabia) Al-Shabab |
| 21 | DF | Rand Abu-Hussein | 1 March 1997 (aged 26) | (Jordan) |
| 22 | GK | Malak Shannak | 1 August 1998 (aged 25) | (Saudi Arabia) Al-Ittihad |
| 23 | MF | Noor Al Mashayek | 13 April 2003 (aged 20) | (Jordan) |
| 24 | GK | Sereen Ihraibi | 22 June 2004 (aged 19) | (Jordan) Etihad |

== Group B ==
=== Palestine ===
Head coach: Amer Khair

| No. | Pos. | Player | Date of birth (age) | Club |
|---|---|---|---|---|
| 1 | GK | Mirave Marouf | 14 January 2006 (aged 18) | |
| 2 | DF | Amna Bakri | 4 October 1999 (aged 24) | (Israel) Arraba |
| 3 | DF | Sara Kord | 5 February 2005 (aged 19) | |
| 4 | DF | Sireen Ghattas | 29 May 2001 (aged 22) | (Palestine) |
| 5 | DF | Aya Khattab (Captain) | 22 December 1999 (aged 24) | |
| 6 | MF | Ahlam-Laila Nasr | 4 November 2004 (aged 19) | (Sweden) Ifö Bromölla IF |
| 7 | MF | Jeniver Shattara | 9 May 2003 (aged 20) | |
| 8 | FW | Malak Barakat | 16 March 2006 (aged 17) | |
| 9 | MF | Tala Gabi | | |
| 10 | FW | Aya Abed | 5 January 1999 (aged 25) | (Israel) Arraba |
| 11 | MF | Natali Shaheen | 2 July 1994 (aged 29) | |
| 12 | MF | Miral Qassis | 22 July 2006 (aged 17) | (Palestine) |
| 13 | MF | Lillian Nasrah | 13 April 2004 (aged 19) | |
| 14 | MF | Zjada Baydass | 23 March 2004 (aged 19) | (United States) |
| 15 | FW | Aline Khoury | 11 May 2000 (aged 23) | |
| 16 | MF | Dina Abdeen | 26 November 2006 (aged 17) | (United States) |
| 17 | MF | Nadine Mohamed | 7 October 2003 (aged 20) | (Germany) Türkiyemspor Berlin |
| 18 | FW | Nour Youssef | 18 July 2005 (aged 18) | (Germany) 1. FC Union Berlin |
| 19 | FW | Dima Al Ramhe | 23 November 2001 (aged 22) | (Israel) Arraba |
| 20 | MF | Nadine Elias | 31 May 1995 (aged 28) | (Israel) Arraba |
| 21 | DF | Mira Natour | 15 May 1999 (aged 24) | |
| 22 | GK | Guevara Alsheikh | | (United States) |
| 23 | GK | Charlotte Phillips | 24 June 2005 (aged 18) | (Canada) York Lions |

=== Nepal ===
Head coach: Rajendra Tamang

An initial 31-player preliminary squad was named on 3 February 2024. The final 23-player squad was announced on 12 February 2024.

| No. | Pos. | Player | Date of birth (age) | Club |
|---|---|---|---|---|
| | GK | Anjila Tumbapo Subba (Captain) | 28 May 1996 (aged 27) | (India) Sethu FC |
| | GK | Anjana Rana Magar | 17 January 2002 (aged 22) | (Nepal) |
| | GK | Usha Nath | 23 January 2001 (aged 23) | (Nepal) |
| | DF | Gita Rana | 21 September 1996 (aged 27) | (India) Sethu FC |
| | DF | Amrita Jaisi | 15 October 1994 (aged 29) | (India) Sports Odisha |
| | DF | Hira Kumari Bhujel | 26 December 1995 (aged 28) | (Nepal) |
| | DF | Bimala B.K. | 17 April 2002 (aged 21) | (Nepal) |
| | DF | Nisha Thokar | 1 February 2001 (aged 23) | (Nepal) |
| | DF | Samikshya Ghimire | 26 December 1999 (aged 24) | (Nepal) |
| | DF | Puja Rana | 29 March 2001 (aged 22) | (Nepal) |
| | DF | Sabina Chaudhary | | (Nepal) |
| | MF | Anita Basnet | 9 February 1994 (aged 30) | |
| | MF | Amisha Karki | 23 October 2005 (aged 18) | (Nepal) |
| | MF | Anita K.C. | 5 January 1997 (aged 27) | (Nepal) |
| | MF | Preeti Rai | 20 November 2004 (aged 19) | (India) Kickstart FC |
| | MF | Dipa Shahi | | (India) Kickstart FC |
| | MF | Bimala Chaudhary | 1 March 1997 (aged 26) | (Nepal) |
| | MF | Chandra Bhandari | | (Nepal) |
| | MF | Saraswati Hamal | | (Nepal) |
| | FW | Sabitra Bhandari | 2 May 1996 (aged 27) | (France) EA Guingamp |
| | FW | Rekha Poudel | 7 January 2001 (aged 23) | (Nepal) |
| | FW | Rashmi Ghising | 15 June 2002 (aged 21) | (India) Sports Odisha |
| | FW | Sabita Rana Magar | 7 July 2003 (aged 20) | (Nepal) |

=== Syria ===
Head coach: Issam Al-Jama

| No. | Pos. | Player | Date of birth (age) | Club |
|---|---|---|---|---|
| 1 | GK | Khozama Al-Melhem | | (Syria) |
| 2 | DF | Dlnay Ismail | | (Syria) |
| 3 | DF | Elham Oglan | | (Syria) |
| 4 | MF | Mai Al-Jany | | (Syria) |
| 5 | DF | Mayar Alloush | | (Syria) |
| 6 | MF | Julnar Mustafa | | (Syria) |
| 7 | FW | Aisha Hamo | | (Syria) |
| 8 | MF | Lana Ibrahem | | (Syria) |
| 9 | FW | Nor Mustafa (Captain) | 29 November 2001 (aged 22) | (Saudi Arabia) Al-Ittihad |
| 10 | FW | Maisalon Mahfoud | | (Syria) |
| 11 | FW | Aya Mohammed | | (Syria) |
| 12 | FW | Hayat Dayoub | | (Syria) |
| 13 | DF | Rasha Ramadan | | (Syria) |
| 14 | MF | Rand Ibrahim | | (Syria) |
| 15 | MF | Taim Al-Ahmad | | (Syria) |
| 16 | DF | Maria Elias | | (Syria) |
| 17 | MF | Sedra Khezran | | (Syria) |
| 18 | FW | Lava Othman | | (Syria) |
| 19 | DF | Razan Khwande | | (Syria) |
| 20 | FW | Seant Omar | | (Syria) |
| 21 | DF | Halaz Haji | 25 August 2003 (aged 20) | (Syria) |
| 22 | GK | Raneem Abu Lateef | 13 December 2005 (aged 18) | (Syria) |
| 23 | GK | Kristen Hanosh | | (Syria) |

=== Iraq ===
Head coach: Adil Qader

The final 23-player squad was announced on 18 February 2024.

| No. | Pos. | Player | Date of birth (age) | Club |
|---|---|---|---|---|
| | GK | Faiza Jalal Mahmoud | | (Iraq) Al-Quwa Al-Jawiya |
| | GK | Zahraa Ali Hussein | | (Iraq) |
| | GK | Salar Abdulwahid Khalid | | (Iraq) |
| | MF | Nadia Fadhil | 28 April 1995 (aged 28) | (Iraq) Al-Quwa Al-Jawiya |
| | DF | Bahra Mohammed | 1 February 1993 (aged 31) | (Iraq) Al-Quwa Al-Jawiya |
| | | Esraa Adnan Hashim | | (Iraq) Al-Quwa Al-Jawiya |
| | | Soz Kazim Kamal | | (Iraq) Al-Quwa Al-Jawiya |
| | | Ghoofran Sadeq Mahdi | | (Iraq) |
| | MF | Mina Kareem Jaber | 24 June 1998 (aged 25) | (Iraq) Naft Al-Shamal |
| | | Tabarak Muaead | | (Iraq) Al-Quwa Al-Jawiya |
| | MF | Direen Mulla Bakr | 13 January 2000 (aged 24) | (Iraq) |
| | MF | Tiba Al-Quraishi | 13 January 1996 (aged 28) | (Iraq) Al-Quwa Al-Jawiya |
| | FW | Sipal Shukur Rasheed | 6 June 1996 (aged 27) | (Iraq) Naft Al-Shamal |
| | | Barzeh Nidham Shawkat | | (Iraq) |
| | MF | Zainab Abbas | 22 December 1996 (aged 27) | (Iraq) Al-Quwa Al-Jawiya |
| | | Mays Mahdi Hassan | | (Iraq) Al-Zawraa |
| | | Samera Rauf Salih | | (Iraq) |
| | | Yusra Ibrahim Hassan | | (Iraq) |
| | | Elaf Hossam-aldine | | (Iraq) Al-Quwa Al-Jawiya |
| | | Sara Sarhang | | (Iraq) |
| | | Huda Hadi Abdulamir | | (Iraq) |
| | | Soulin Abdullah Saadi | | (Iraq) |
| | FW | Shokhan Nooraldin | 10 April 2000 (aged 23) | (Saudi Arabia) Al Hilal |
