= Rama Singh =

Nepali television personality and footballer

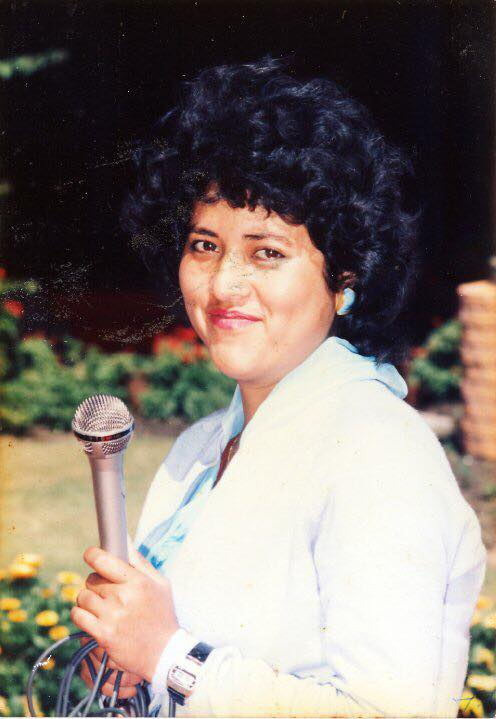
- Rama Singh at an event

Personal information
- Full name: Rama Singh
- Place of birth: Kathmandu, Nepal
- Height: 5 ft 3 in (1.60 m)
- Position: Midfielder

International career
Years	Team	Apps	(Gls)
1986—1999	Nepal		

Rama Singh is a Nepalese television personality and former soccer player and captain for the Nepal women's national football team.

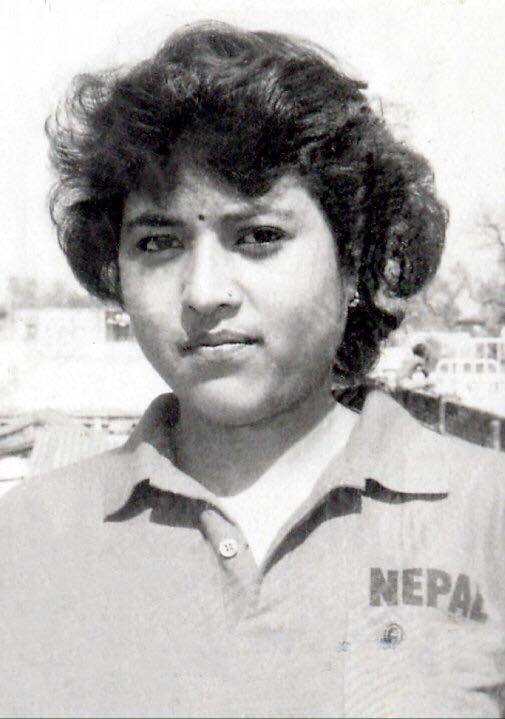
The official portrait for women's national football team

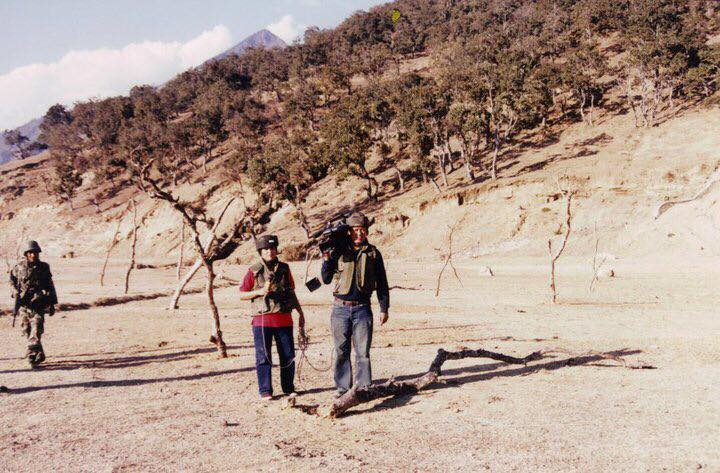
Reporting at a mopping up operation with the Nepal Army during a Maoist insurgency at Kotwada, Kalikot, Nepal

== Football / soccer career ==
After the announcement that FIFA wouldn’t be allowed to fund those associations which did not include women’s football, the Asian Football Federation introduced women's football in Nepal. The president of All Nepal Football Association, Kamal Thapa, initiated the women’s football team. Rama Singh played while studying Masters Level.

Singh started her journey in football in 1983 as the captain on Nepal’s women football's Bagmati team. At the 1986 Asian Cup, she captained Nepal as it made its international debut. The 16-member squad, selected from the National Games in Illam, lost the match against Hong Kong by 1-0. She later represented Nepal at the 1989 and 1999 Asian Cup.

== Television and film career ==
Singh started her career as a news anchor of Nepal Television in 1986. She is known to be the first news anchor in Nepali Television history. When Nepal Television was introduced in Nepal in 1985, she was not completely aware about journalism. Before entering the television field, she was actively a part of broadcasting media in Radio Nepal since she was 5 years old through her father B.B Singh.

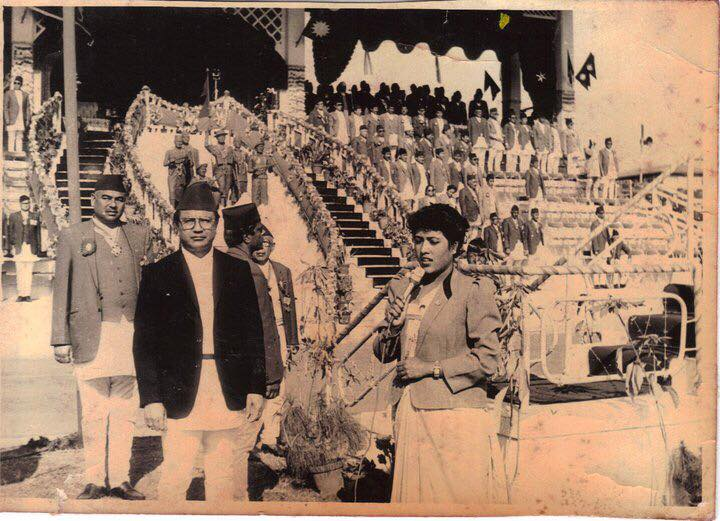
Broadcasting live at Tudikhel, Nepal on constitution day 1989

She wrote a supporting documentary on journalism including the pros and cons of having training in this field as she didn't get enough training.

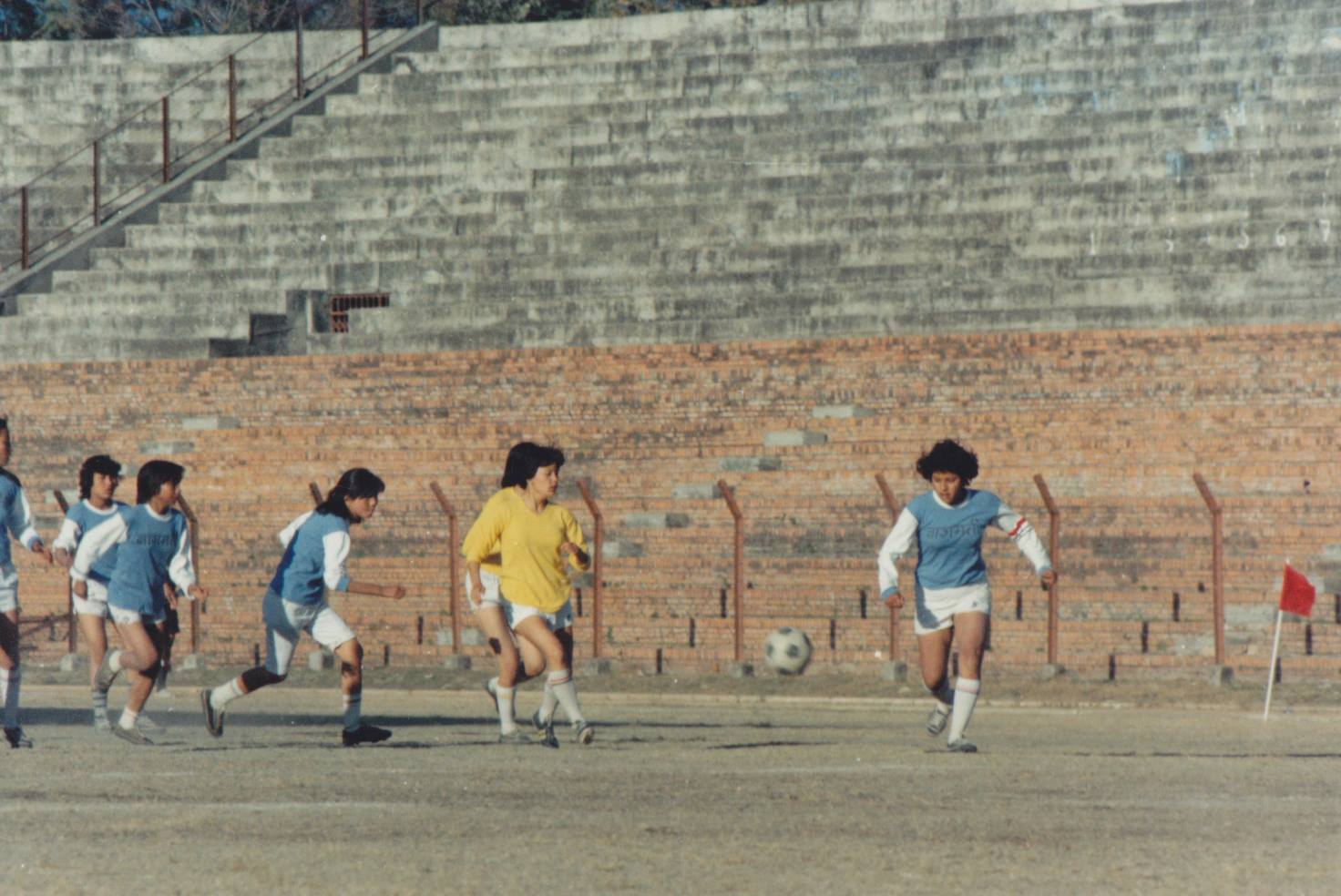
One of the local games in Kathmandu, Nepal

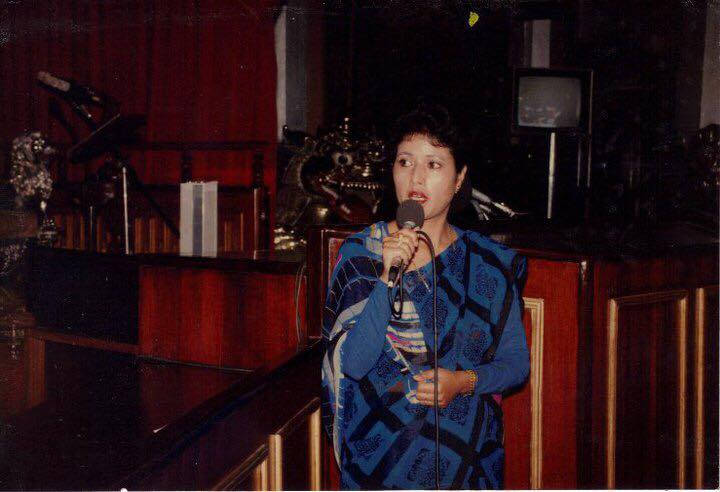
In the parliament building broadcasting live

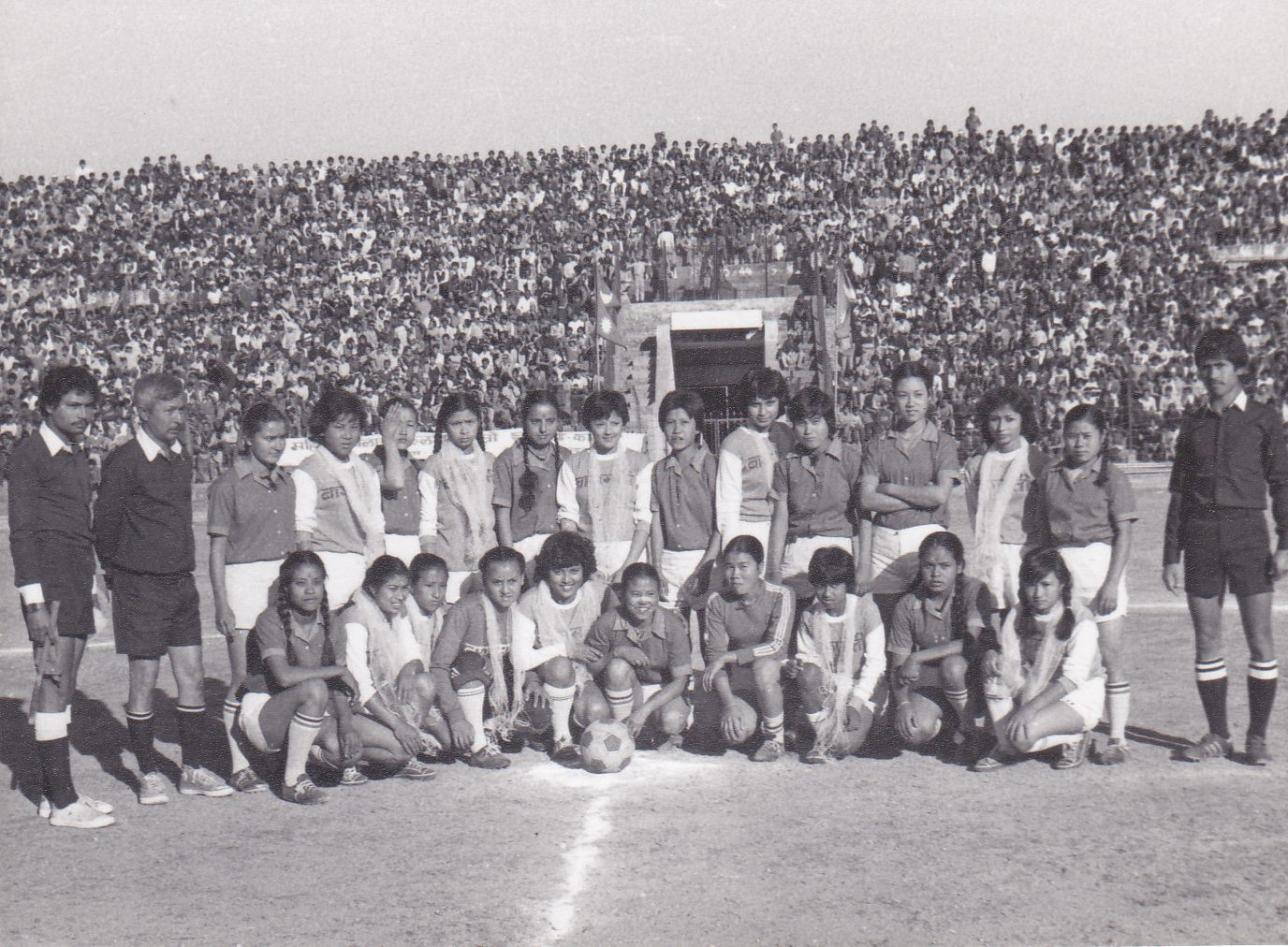
First international football game in the Nepali women's football history

Singh has also released a poetry book titled "Sanghar Ma Parkhi Basey" released in 2000. She later released a song album from the book which featured 11 artists such as Rabin Sharma and Reema gurung.

Singh acted in the film entitled, Basudev.

== Other work ==
While in America, she started a "One-Dollar Project" which provided help and free education to the children of Nepal who lost their parents in Nepalese wars.

== Achievements ==
- Selected as one of the Nepal’s Top 50 Personalities of Year 2004, The Boss Magazine
- Selected as one of the 10 Most Influential Women of Nepal in Year 2004, The Boss Magazine
- Selected as one of the 50 Most Influential Women of Nepal in Year 2005, The Boss Magazine
- "Prabal Gorkhadakshin Bahu" Medal from HM the King of Nepal in 2006
- "Tarani Dutta Koirala Media Award" from the Reporters Club Nepal in 2006
- "Celebrity Women Hood Award" from Celebrity Women’s Organization in 2005
- "Birendra Aishwarya Sewa Padak" from the HM the King of Nepal in 2002
- "Bhupal Man Singh Award" from Bhupal Man Singh Trust in 1998
- "Gaddhi Aarohan Rajat Mahotsab Award" from the HM the King of Nepal in 1996
- "Abhiyan National Award" from Abhiyan, a professional group of Nepali artists, in 1988
