= Dhruba KC =

Nepalese football manager

Personal information
- Full name: Dhruba KC
- Place of birth: Nepal

Managerial career
- Years: Team
- 1998: Nepal men's
- 2005: Three Star Club
- 2010: Machhindra
- 2010–12: Nepal women's
- 2015–: Nepal men's

Dhruba KC was the coach of the Nepal national football team, appointed on July 16, 2015, after the contact of foreign coach Jack Stefanowski was not renewed.

== Career ==
Dhruba KC started off by coaching Nepal national football team in the All India Governor's Gold Cup in Sikkim, India. However, as the tournament is not an official international tournament it wasn't recognized by FIFA as actually having coached the national team. Dhruba KC also coached the Three Star Club in 2005 where his team reached the semi-finals of the 2005 AFC President's Cup only to lose on penalties. He also coached the Nepali women's national team in the inaugural 2010 SAFF Women's Championship and subsequent 2012 SAFF Women's Championship where both times Nepal finished runners up to India. Dhruba KC also spent a brief time as head coach of Machhindra in 2010.
