= Rebecca Bartosh =

Guamanian footballer (born 2000)

Personal information
- Date of birth: October 4, 2000 (age 26)
- Place of birth: Canada
- Height: 5 ft 6 in (1.68 m)
- Positions: Midfielder; defender

Team information
- Current team: Rome City

College career
Years	Team	Apps	(Gls)
2019–2020	Pittsburgh Panthers	19	(0)
2021–2022	Kansas State Wildcats	3	(0)

Senior career*
Years	Team	Apps	(Gls)
2023–	Rome City		

International career
2023–	Guam		
- * Club domestic league appearances and goals

Rebecca Bartosh is a professional footballer who plays as a midfielder for Rome City. Born in Guam, she plays for the Guam national team.

== Early life ==
The daughter of a policeman, Bartosh started playing football at the age of four. She spent time living in Virginia as a child. Bartosh attended the University of Pittsburgh.

== Club career ==
Bartosh played for American side FC Virginia, where she captained the club.

== International career ==
Bartosh represented Guam internationally at the 2024 EAFF E-1 Football Championship.

== International goals ==
No.	Date	Venue	Opponent	Score	Result	Competition
1.	2 December 2023	Suoka Sports Training Base, Zhuhai, China	Macau	2–0	6–0	2025 EAFF E-1 Football Championship
2.	2 December 2023	Suoka Sports Training Base, Zhuhai, China	Macau	5–0	6–0	2025 EAFF E-1 Football Championship
3.	19 February 2024	King Abdullah Sports City Reserve Stadium, Jeddah, Saudi Arabia	Lebanon	1–0	3–4	2024 WAFF Women's Championship
4.	19 February 2024	King Abdullah Sports City Reserve Stadium, Jeddah, Saudi Arabia	Lebanon	2–0	3–4	2024 WAFF Women's Championship
5.	2 July 2025	Việt Trì Stadium, Việt Trì, Vietnam	Maldives	1–0	3–0	2026 AFC Women's Asian Cup qualification
6.	2 July 2025	Việt Trì Stadium, Việt Trì, Vietnam	Maldives	2–0	3–0	2026 AFC Women's Asian Cup qualification
7.	2 July 2025	Việt Trì Stadium, Việt Trì, Vietnam	Maldives	3–0	3–0	2026 AFC Women's Asian Cup qualification

== Style of play ==
Bartosh mainly operates as a midfielder and is two-footed.
