= Rekha Poudel =

Nepalese footballer (born 2001)

Personal information
- Date of birth: 7 January 2001 (age 25)
- Place of birth: Khotang District, Nepal
- Height: 1.60 m (5 ft 3 in)
- Position: Forward

Team information
- Current team: Nepal Police

Senior career*
Years	Team	Apps	(Gls)
–2019	Biratnagar Metropolitan City		
2019–2021	APF		
2021–2022	Nepal Police		
2023	Sports Odisha	7	(4)
2024–2025	Abu Dhabi Country Club	4	(2)
2025	Maziya	4	(8)
2026–	Nepal Police		
2026-	Phnom Penh Crown	1	(1)

International career^{‡}
2014	Nepal U14	5	(+1)
2018	Nepal U18	4	(7)
2018–2019	Nepal U19	4	(2)
2019–	Nepal	20	(12)
Medal record
Women's football
Representing Nepal
SAFF Women's Championship
Runner-up	Nepal 2019	Team
Runner-up	Nepal 2022	Team
Runner-up	Nepal 2024	Team
WAFF Women's Championship
Runner-up	Saudi Arabia 2024	Team
- * Club domestic league appearances and goals as of 23 December 2025 ‡ National team caps and goals as of 29 February 2024

Rekha Poudel (Nepali: रेखा पौडेल; born 7 January 2001) is a Nepalese professional footballer who plays for the Nepalese club Nepal Police and the Nepal national team.

== Club career ==
In 2019, Paudel played a pivotal role in Biratnagar Metropolitan City's triumph in the Deputy Mayor Cup Women's Football Tournament and was named the tournament's best player.

In April 2023, She joined Indian Women's League Side Sports Odisha.

=== Abu Dhabi Country Club ===
On 5 August 2024, Poudel signed with the United Arab Emirates champions Abu Dhabi Country Club ahead of for their debut in the 2024–25 AFC Women's Champions League. On 25 August 2024, She made her debut for the club in a 2–1 victory over Laos's Young Elephants, netting her first goal in the 46th minute and becoming the first Nepalese player to score in the AFC Women's Champions League. On the final matchday against Host Al Nassr, She scored the winning goal in the 68th minute, securing the club's place in the group stage of the inaugural edition. On 6 October 2024, Rekha Poudel became the first Nepali footballer, male or female, to compete in the group stage of the AFC Women's Champions League, making her debut in the final round of the competition, not just the preliminary round.

== International career ==
=== Youth ===
In 2018, 17-year-old Poudel was a part of the Nepalese under-18 team who finished as runners-up in the 2018 SAFF U-18 Women's Championship. She scored 7 goals in the opening match, a 12–0 victory over Pakistan. She also played the 2019 AFC U-19 Women's Championship qualification, marking Nepal's first youth-level continental appearance. She scored a brace against India, helping her team advance to the next round.

=== Senior ===
In 2019, she was named to the final squad for the 2019 SAFF Women's Championship. She made her Senior debut on 12 March 2019, coming on as substitute in the 88th minute in a 3–0 win against Bhutan. On 20 March 2019, She scored her first goal for the team in a 4–0 victory over Sri Lanka in the semifinals.

== Career statistics ==
=== International ===
As of match played on 24 October 2024

Appearances and goals by national team and year
National team	Year	Apps	Goals
Nepal	2019	5	1
Nepal	2022	3	0
Nepal	2023	5	1
Nepal	2024	7	9
Nepal	2025		1
Total		20	12

Scores and results list Nepal's goal tally first, score column indicates score after each Poudel goal.
As of match played on 21 October 2024

List of international goals scored by Rekha Poudel
No.	Date	Venue	Opponent	Score	Result	Competition
1	20 March 2019	Sahid Rangsala, Biratnagar, Nepal	Sri Lanka	4–0	4–0	2019 SAFF Women's Championship
2	28 September 2023	Wenzhou Sports Center Stadium, Wenzhou, China	Bangladesh	1–1	1–1	2022 Asian Games
3	20 February 2024	King Abdullah Sports City Reserve Stadium, Jeddah, Saudi Arabia	Syria	4–1	4–1	2024 WAFF Women's Championship
4	24 February 2024	King Abdullah Sports City Reserve Stadium, Jeddah, Saudi Arabia	Palestine	2–0	4–0	2024 WAFF Women's Championship
5	21 October 2024	Dasharath Rangasala, Kathmandu, Nepal	Maldives	3–0	11–0	2024 SAFF Women's Championship
6	21 October 2024	Dasharath Rangasala, Kathmandu, Nepal	Maldives	4–0	11–0	2024 SAFF Women's Championship
7	21 October 2024	Dasharath Rangasala, Kathmandu, Nepal	Maldives	5–0	11–0	2024 SAFF Women's Championship
8	21 October 2024	Dasharath Rangasala, Kathmandu, Nepal	Maldives	6–0	11–0	2024 SAFF Women's Championship
9	21 October 2024	Dasharath Rangasala, Kathmandu, Nepal	Maldives	9–0	11–0	2024 SAFF Women's Championship
10	24 October 2024	Dasharath Rangasala, Kathmandu, Nepal	Sri Lanka	3–0	6–0	2024 SAFF Women's Championship
11	24 October 2024	Dasharath Rangasala, Kathmandu, Nepal	Sri Lanka	4–0	6–0	2024 SAFF Women's Championship
12	2 July 2025	Milliy Stadium, Tashkent, Uzbekistan	Sri Lanka	7–0	8–0	2026 AFC Women's Asian Cup qualification
