= 2024 WAFF Women's Championship =

8th edition of the WAFF Women's Championship

بطولة اتحاد غرب آسيا الثامنة للسيدات

Tournament details
- Host country: Saudi Arabia
- City: Jeddah
- Dates: 19–29 February
- Teams: 8 (from 3 sub-confederations)
- Venues: 2 (in 1 host city)

Final positions
- Champions: Jordan (6th title)
- Runners-up: Nepal

Tournament statistics
- Matches played: 15
- Goals scored: 56 (3.73 per match)
- Attendance: 12,700 (847 per match)
- Top scorer(s): (Nepal) Sabitra Bhandari (9 goals)
- Best player: (Jordan) Maysa Jbarah
- Best goalkeeper: (Jordan) Sherin Al-Shalabe

The 2024 WAFF Women's Championship was the eighth edition of the WAFF Women's Championship, the international women's football tournament in West Asia competed by the national teams in the West Asian Football Federation (WAFF). The tournament was hosted by the kingdom of Saudi Arabia, it was the first major women's football tournament to be hosted in the kingdom.

Jordan were three-time defending champions having won the last three editions (Jordan 2014, Bahrain 2019 and Jordan 2022). and they successfully retained the title for the sixth time, after beating Nepal on penalties in the final. In the other hand tournament's host Saudi Arabia were unable to secure victory in any of their matches. Nepalese striker Sabitra Bhandari won the top scorer award scoring nine goals throughout the tournament. Jordanian player Maysa Jbarah was voted the tournament's best player, whilst Jbarah teammate Sherin Al-Shalabe was awarded the best goalkeeper award.

== Teams ==
=== Participating teams ===
On 4 February 2024, the WAFF announced that 8 countries would participate in the 2024 edition – the highest number of participating countries in a single edition since United Arab Emirates 2011 – with Saudi Arabia participating for the first time in a major football tournament. This was also the first edition where non-West Asian Football Federation members were also invited, namely Guam, an EAFF member and Nepal, a SAFF member.

Although numerous Egyptian media outlets indicated that an invitation had been sent to the Egypt women's national football team for the 2024 edition, the team was not included in the list of participants published on 4 February 2024.

Country	Appearance	Previous best performance	FIFA ranking December 2023
Guam	1st	Debut	93
Iraq	2nd	Group stage (2011)	NR
Jordan	8th	Champions (2005, 2007, 2014, 2019, 2022)	74
Lebanon	5th	Runners-up (2022)	134
Nepal	1st	Debut	105
Palestine	7th	Runners-up (2014)	136
Saudi Arabia	1st	Debut	175
Syria	5th	Third place (2005, 2022)	160

Did not enter

- Bahrain
- Kuwait
- Oman
- Qatar
- United Arab Emirates
- Yemen

=== Draw ===
The final draw took place at the West Asian Football Federation Headquarters in Amman, Jordan, on 5 February 2024 at 11:00 AST (UTC+3).

For the draw, The eight participating teams were drawn into a singular pot. Saudi Arabia, the host nation was identified by a different color and was automatically allocated to Group A, Position A1. A second pot with 8 balls representing positions A1, A2, A3, A4, B1, B2, B3, and B4 was used for the draw. The A1 position was marked with a different color. each time a team was drawn from the first pot was simultaneously assigned its specific position from the second pot.

=== Squads ===
Each team had to register a squad of 23 players, minimum three of whom must be goalkeepers.

== Match officials ==
Referees

- (Bahrain) Mohamed Juma
- (Bahrain) Ahmed Saad
- (Iraq) Ahmed Gatea
- (Jordan) Esraa Al-Mbaiden
- (Jordan) Haneen Murad
- (Lebanon) Doumouh Al Bakkar
- (Palestine) Muath Owfi
- (Syria) Alesar Baddour
- (United Arab Emirates) Khuloud Al-Zaabi

Assistant referees

- (Bahrain) Nawaf Moosa
- (Bahrain) Salman Mohamed Talasi
- (Iraq) Karrar Abbas Half
- (Jordan) Islam Al-Abadi
- (Jordan) Sabreen Al-Abadi
- (Lebanon) Mohamad El Hajje
- (Palestine) Alaa Amro
- (Syria) Roba Zarka
- (United Arab Emirates) Amal Badhafari

== Venues ==
On 4 February 2024, WAFF announced Jeddah as the designated host city, with two chosen venues: the annex stadium of King Abdullah Sports City for the group stage and Prince Abdullah Al-Faisal Sports City for the knockout stage.

2024 WAFF Women's Championship is located in Saudi Arabia	Jeddah	
2024 WAFF Women's Championship is located in Saudi Arabia	King Abdullah Sports City Reserve Stadium	Prince Abdullah Al-Faisal Sports City
2024 WAFF Women's Championship is located in Saudi Arabia	Capacity: 10,000	Capacity: 27,000

== Group stage ==
Tiebreakers

Teams were ranked according to points (3 points for a win, 1 point for a draw, 0 points for a loss), and if tied on points, the following tiebreaking criteria were applied, in the order given, to determine the rankings:

1. Points in head-to-head matches among tied teams;
2. Goal difference in head-to-head matches among tied teams;
3. Goals scored in head-to-head matches among tied teams;
4. If more than two teams are tied, and after applying all head-to-head criteria above, a subset of teams are still tied, all head-to-head criteria above are reapplied exclusively to this subset of teams;
5. Goal difference in all group matches;
6. Goals scored in all group matches;
7. Disciplinary points (yellow card = 1 point, red card as a result of two yellow cards = 3 points, direct red card = 3 points, yellow card followed by direct red card = 4 points);
8. Drawing of lots.

=== Group A ===
Pos	Team	Pld	W	D	L	GF	GA	GD	Pts	Qualification
1	Jordan	3	3	0	0	8	1	+7	9	Advance to knockout phase
2	Lebanon	3	2	0	1	7	7	0	6	Advance to knockout phase
3	Guam	3	1	0	2	5	7	−2	3	
4	Saudi Arabia (H)	3	0	0	3	3	8	−5	0	

Source: GSA
(H) Hosts
19 February 2024
17:00

Guam	3–4	Lebanon
Bartosh 8', 17'; Anaya 84'	Report; Report (WAFF); Report (AFC)	L. Iskandar 48', 88', 90+3'; Maalouf 74'

King Abdullah Sports City Reserve Stadium, Jeddah
Attendance: 200
Referee: Khuloud Al-Zaabi (United Arab Emirates)
19 February 2024
20:00

Saudi Arabia	1–3	Jordan
Mohammed 34'	Report; Report (WAFF); Report (AFC)	Sweilem 26'; Jbarah 62'; Al-Majali 73' (pen.)

King Abdullah Sports City Reserve Stadium, Jeddah
Attendance: 900
Referee: Mohamed Juma (Bahrain)

21 February 2024
17:00

Jordan	3–0	Guam
Jbarah 42', 65'; Pedemonte 79' (o.g.)	Report; Report (WAFF); Report (AFC)

King Abdullah Sports City Reserve Stadium, Jeddah
Attendance: 300
Referee: Ahmed Saad (Bahrain)
21 February 2024
20:00

Lebanon	3–2	Saudi Arabia
Maalouf 3'; Saud 6' (o.g.); Salha 38' (pen.)	Report; Report (WAFF); Report (AFC)	Abdulrazak 61'; Tawfiq 81'

King Abdullah Sports City Reserve Stadium, Jeddah
Attendance: 700
Referee: Ahmed Gatea (Iraq)

23 February 2024
17:00

Lebanon	0–2	Jordan
	Report; Report (WAFF); Report (AFC)	Hazem 65'; Feras 80'

King Abdullah Sports City Reserve Stadium, Jeddah
Attendance: 500
Referee: Muath Owfi (Palestine)
23 February 2024
20:00

Saudi Arabia	0–2	Guam
	Report; Report (WAFF); Report (AFC)	Anaya 21', 41'

King Abdullah Sports City Reserve Stadium, Jeddah
Attendance: 500
Referee: Alesar Baddour (Syria)

=== Group B ===
Pos	Team	Pld	W	D	L	GF	GA	GD	Pts	Qualification
1	Nepal	3	3	0	0	13	1	+12	9	Advance to knockout phase
2	Palestine	3	2	0	1	4	4	0	6	Advance to knockout phase
3	Syria	3	1	0	2	4	5	−1	3	
4	Iraq	3	0	0	3	0	11	−11	0	

Source: GSA
20 February 2024
17:00

Nepal	4–1	Syria
Karki 9'; Basnet 12'; Bhandari 18'; Poudel 68'	Report; Report (WAFF); Report (AFC)	Mustafa 43'

King Abdullah Sports City Reserve Stadium, Jeddah
Attendance: 500
Referee: Doumouh Al Bakkar (Lebanon)
20 February 2024
20:00

Palestine	3–0	Iraq
Youssef 63' (pen.), 64'; Abed 68'	Report; Report (WAFF); Report (AFC)

King Abdullah Sports City Reserve Stadium, Jeddah
Attendance: 300
Referee: Esraa Al-Mbaiden (Jordan)

22 February 2024
17:00

Iraq	0–5	Nepal
	Report; Report (WAFF); Report (AFC)	Bhandari 14', 15', 36', 43', 79'

King Abdullah Sports City Reserve Stadium, Jeddah
Attendance: 700
Referee: Haneen Murad (Jordan)
22 February 2024
20:00

Syria	0–1	Palestine
	Report; Report (WAFF); Report (AFC)	Qassis 87'

King Abdullah Sports City Reserve Stadium, Jeddah
Attendance: 100
Referee: Khuloud Al-Zaabi (United Arab Emirates)

24 February 2024
17:00

Syria	3–0	Iraq
Elias 38'; Mustafa 49'; Khwandi 80'	Report; Report (WAFF); Report (AFC)

King Abdullah Sports City Reserve Stadium, Jeddah
Attendance: 100
Referee: Doumouh Al Bakkar (Lebanon)
24 February 2024
20:00

Palestine	0–4	Nepal
	Report; Report (WAFF); Report (AFC)	Bhandari 40', 78'; Poudel 59'; G. Rana 90+6' (pen.)

King Abdullah Sports City Reserve Stadium, Jeddah
Attendance: 900
Referee: Ahmed Saad (Bahrain)

== Knockout stage ==
In the knockout stage, penalty shoot-out would be used to decide the winner if necessary (no extra time was played).

=== Bracket ===
Semi-finals
27 February – Jeddah
Jordan	5
Palestine	0
27 February – Jeddah
Nepal	2
Lebanon	1

Final
29 February – Jeddah
Jordan	2 (5)
Nepal	2 (3)

=== Semi-finals ===
27 February 2024
17:00

Jordan	5–0	Palestine
Jbarah 27', 83'; Feras 34'; Abu Sabbah 59'; Al-Jamaeen 86' (pen.)	Report; Report (WAFF); Report (AFC)

Prince Abdullah Al-Faisal Sports City, Jeddah
Attendance: 200
Referee: Ahmed Gatea (Iraq)
27 February 2024
20:00

Nepal	2–1	Lebanon
Bhandari 76'; Rai 90+4'	Report; Report (WAFF); Report (AFC)	P. Rana 37' (o.g.)

Prince Abdullah Al-Faisal Sports City, Jeddah
Attendance: 2,000
Referee: Ahmed Saad (Bahrain)

=== Final ===
29 February 2024
19:00

Jordan	2–2	Nepal
Feras 73'; Abu-Sabbah 89'	Report; Report (WAFF); Report (AFC)	Rana Magar 28'; G. Rana 90+2' (pen.)
Penalties
Al-Majali (penalty scored); Jbarah (penalty scored); Zoqash (penalty scored); Abu-Sabbah (penalty scored); Fraij (penalty scored)	5–3	(penalty scored) G. Rana; (penalty scored) Shahi; (penalty scored) Kumari Bhujel; (penalty missed) Jaisi

Prince Abdullah Al-Faisal Sports City, Jeddah
Attendance: 4,800
Referee: Mohamed Juma (Bahrain)

Jordan	Nepal

GK	1	Sherin Al-Shalabe
DF	19	Ayah Al-Majali
DF	21	Rand Abu-Hussein
DF	3	Alanoud Al-Zabrey
DF	7	Nour Zoqash
DF	20	Lana Feras
MF	8	Enas Al-Jamaeen		(substituted off) 33'
FW	10	Sarah Abu-Sabbah	(yellow card) 43'
MF	17	Rouzbahan Fraij
FW	13	Leen Al-Btoush		(substituted off) 58'
FW	11	Maysa Jbarah (c)
Substitutions:
FW	9	Bana Al-Bitar		(substituted on) 33'
MF	16	Zaina Hazem		(substituted on) 58'
Manager:
Maher Abu Hantash

GK	16	Anjila Tumbapo Subba (c)
DF	2	Puja Rana	(yellow card) 90+6'
DF	5	Amrita Jaisi	(yellow card) 73'
DF	6	Hira Kumari Bhujel
FW	10	Rashmi Ghising		(substituted off) 45+2'
DF	12	Gita Rana
FW	13	Rekha Poudel	(yellow card) 79'
MF	14	Preeti Rai		(substituted off) 74'
FW	18	Sabita Rana Magar
MF	19	Amisha Karki		(substituted off) 90'
MF	23	Dipa Shahi
Substitutions:
MF	11	Anita Basnet		(substituted on) 45+2'
DF	15	Amrita Jaisi		(substituted on) 74'
MF	17	Bimala Chaudhary		(substituted on) 90'
Manager:
Rajendra Tamang

Assistant referees:
Nawaf Moosa (Bahrain)
Salman Mohamed Talasi (Bahrain)
Fourth official:
Khuloud Al-Zaabi (United Arab Emirates)

== Awards ==
The following awards were given at the conclusion of the tournament:

Top scorer
(Nepal) Sabitra Bhandari
9 goals
Best Player
(Jordan) Maysa Jbarah
Best goalkeeper
(Jordan) Sherin Al-Shalabe

== Statistics ==
=== Goal scorers ===
There were 56 goals scored in 15 matches, for an average of 3.73 goals per match.

9 goals

- (Nepal) Sabitra Bhandari

5 goals

- (Jordan) Maysa Jbarah

3 goals

- (Guam) Mariah Anaya
- (Jordan) Lana Feras
- (Lebanon) Lili Iskandar

2 goals

- (Guam) Rebecca Bartosh
- (Lebanon) Christy Maalouf
- (Nepal) Rekha Poudel
- (Nepal) Gita Rana
- (Palestine) Nour Youssef
- (Syria) Nor Mustafa

1 goal

- (Jordan) Mai Sweilem
- (Jordan) Ayah Al-Majali
- (Jordan) Zaina Hazem
- (Jordan) Sarah Abu Sabbah
- (Jordan) Enas Al-Jamaeen
- (Jordan) Sarah Abu-Sabbah
- (Lebanon) Syntia Salha
- (Nepal) Amisha Karki
- (Nepal) Anita Basnet
- (Nepal) Preeti Rai
- (Nepal) Sabita Rana Magar
- (Palestine) Aya Abed
- (Palestine) Miral Qassis
- (Saudi Arabia) Leen Mohammed
- (Saudi Arabia) Lana Abdulrazak
- (Saudi Arabia) Seba Tawfiq
- (Syria) Maria Elias
- (Syria) Razan Khwandi

1 own goal

- (Guam) Aida-Rose Pedemonte (against Jordan)
- (Nepal) Puja Rana (against Lebanon)
- (Saudi Arabia) Nouf Saud (against Lebanon)

Source: GSA

=== Tournament rankings ===
Pos.	Team	G	Pld	W	D	L	Pts	GF	GA	GD
1	Jordan	A	5	4	1	0	13	15	3	+12
2	Nepal	B	5	4	1	0	13	17	4	+13
Eliminated in the semi-finals
3	Lebanon	A	4	2	0	2	6	8	9	−1
4	Palestine	B	4	2	0	2	6	4	9	−5
Eliminated in the group stage
5	Syria	B	3	1	0	2	3	4	5	−1
6	Guam	A	3	1	0	2	3	5	7	−2
7	Saudi Arabia	A	3	0	0	3	0	3	8	−5
8	Iraq	B	3	0	0	3	0	0	11	−11
