= Nor Mustafa =

Syrian international footballer (born 2001)

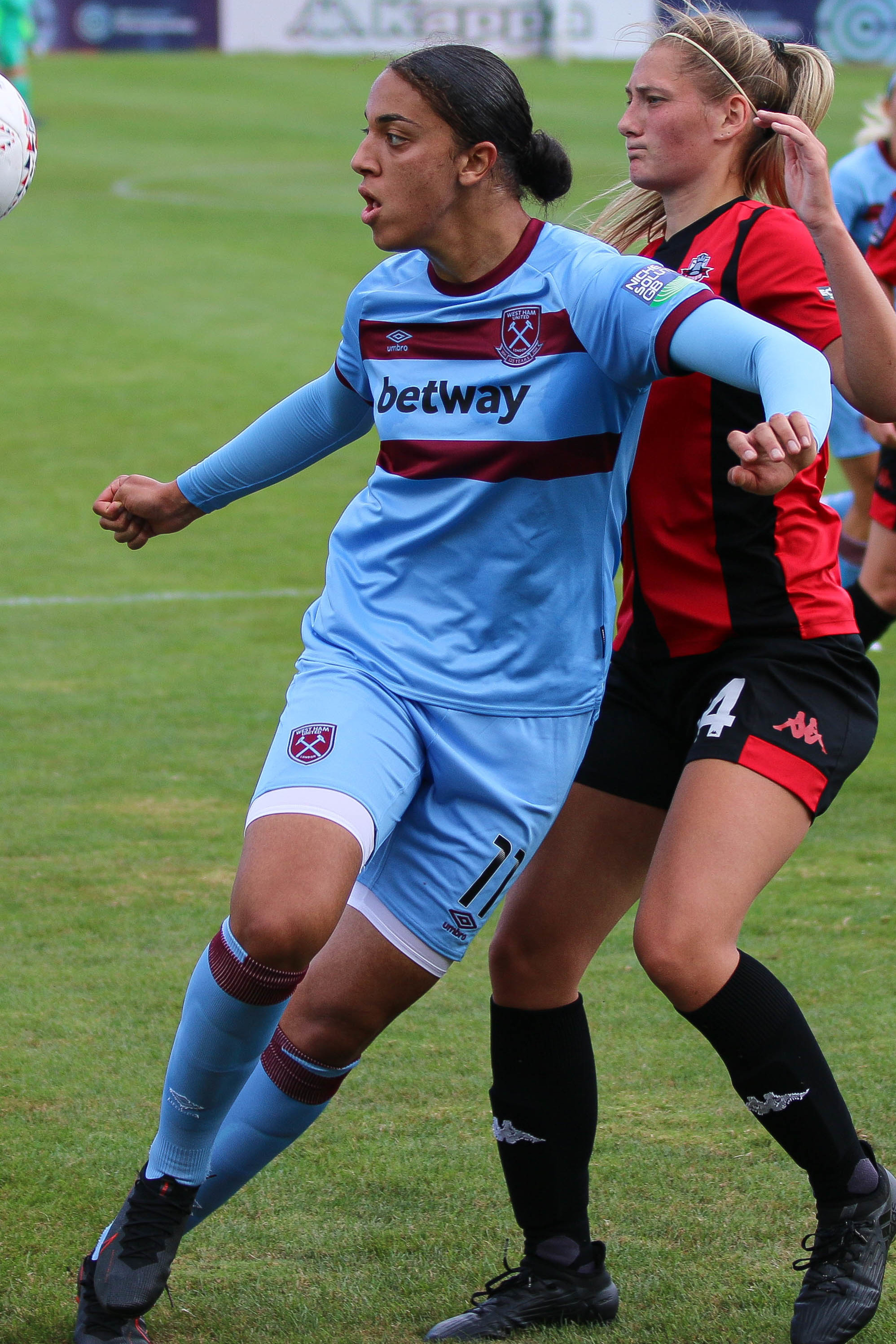
- Mustafa with West Ham United in 2020

Personal information
- Date of birth: 29 November 2001 (age 24)
- Place of birth: Eskilstuna, Sweden
- Height: 1.80 m (5 ft 11 in)
- Position: Forward

Team information
- Current team: Al-Ittihad
- Number: 9

Senior career*
Years	Team	Apps	(Gls)
2019–2020	Eskilstuna United	1	(0)
2020–2021	West Ham United	9	(0)
2021–2022	Le Havre	8	(0)
2022	Hibernian	27	(3)
2023–2024	Al-Ittihad	7	(5)
2024–	Eastern Flames	17	(7)

International career^{‡}
2019–2020	Sweden U19		
2024–	Syria	5	(3)
- * Club domestic league appearances and goals ‡ National team caps and goals as of 24 February 2026

Nor Mustafa (Arabic: نُور مُصْطَفَى; born 29 November 2001) is a professional footballer who plays as a forward for the Saudi Women's Premier League club Eastern Flames. Born in Sweden, she plays for the Syria national team.

== Club career ==
Mustafa joined West Ham in July 2020, becoming the club's fifth signing of the summer. She made her debut on 6 September, coming on in the 81st minute in a 1–1 draw with Tottenham. She was transferred to French Division 2 Féminine club Le Havre in September 2021.

== International career ==
On 12 February 2024, the Syrian Football Association announced that Mustafa had switched her FIFA nationality and became eligible to represent Syria at international stage. She joined the team for the 2024 WAFF Women's Championship, and made her debut on 13 February 2024, in a pre-tournament friendly 1–0 defeat against Lebanon.

== Personal life ==
Mustafa is of Syrian Kurdish descent.

== Career statistics ==
=== Club ===
Appearances and goals by club, season and competition
Club	Season	League			National cup		League cup		Total	
Club	Season	Division	Apps	Goals	Apps	Goals	Apps	Goals	Apps	Goals
Eskilstuna United	2019	Damallsvenskan	1	0	1 (Note: Appearances in the Svenska Cupen Damer)	1	–		2	1
West Ham United	2020–21	FA WSL	9	0	0	0	6 (Note: Appearances in the FA Women's League Cup)	1	15	1
Le Havre AC	2021–22	D2 Féminin	8	0	3	1			11	1
Hibernian	2022–23	SWPL 1	27	3	1	0			28	3
Al-Ittihad	2023–24	Saudi Women's Premier League	7	5	2	0			9	5
Easter Flames	2024–25	Saudi Women's Premier League	17	7					17	7
Career total			69	15	7	2	6	1	83	18

=== International ===
Statistics accurate as of match played 24 February 2024.

Syria
Year	Apps	Goals
2024	5	3
Total	5	3

As of match played 24 February 2024. Syria score listed first, score column indicates score after each Mustafa goal.

No.	Date	Cap	Venue	Opponent	Score	Result	Competition
1	15 February 2024	2	Safa Stadium, Beirut, Lebanon	Lebanon	1–3	1–3	Friendly
2	20 February 2024	3	King Abdullah Sports City Reserve Stadium, Jeddah, Saudi Arabia	Nepal	1–3	1–4	2024 WAFF Women's Championship
3	24 February 2024	5	King Abdullah Sports City Reserve Stadium, Jeddah, Saudi Arabia	Iraq	2–0	3–0	2024 WAFF Women's Championship
