= 2025 International Women's Championship =

Women's national association football tournament

Vianet International Women's Championship

Tournament details
- Host country: Nepal
- Dates: 17–26 February 2025
- Teams: 4 (from 1 confederation)
- Venue: 1 (in 1 host city)

Final positions
- Champions: Myanmar (1st title)
- Runners-up: Nepal
- Third place: Lebanon
- Fourth place: Kyrgyzstan

Tournament statistics
- Matches played: 7
- Goals scored: 19 (2.71 per match)
- Top scorer: (Myanmar) May Htet Lu (3 goals)
- Best player: (Nepal) Renuka Nagarkote

The 2025 International Women's Championship, officially known as the Vianet International Women's Championship for sponsorship with Vianet Communications, was a friendly international women's football championship. Held at Dasharath Stadium in Kathmandu, Nepal from 17 to 26 February 2025, the tournament was played by four teams: Myanmar, Nepal, Kyrgyzstan, and Lebanon.

The final, which took place on 26 February 2025, saw the top two-placed teams in the single round-robin (Myanmar and Nepal, respectively) face each other. Myanmar beat hosts Nepal 2–0 to claim the title.

== Teams ==
=== Participants ===
Four teams, all from the AFC, entered the tournament.

Country	Confederation	FIFA ranking (December 2024)
Myanmar	AFC	55
Nepal	AFC	103
Kyrgyzstan	AFC	128
Lebanon	AFC	134

== Group stage ==
Team	Pld	W	D	L	GF	GA	GD	Pts	Result
Myanmar	3	2	1	0	10	3	+7	7	Advanced to final
Nepal	3	2	1	0	4	2	+2	7	Advanced to final
Lebanon	3	1	0	2	3	4	−1	3	
Kyrgyzstan	3	0	0	3	0	8	−8	0	

Source: ANFA Instagram, Global Sports Archive
17 February 2025
13:30 UTC+5:45

Myanmar	3–1	Lebanon
Win Theingi Tun 57'; Shwe Yee Tun 72'; San Thaw Thaw 75'	Report	Iskandar 60'

Dasharath Rangasala, Kathmandu
Referee: Anjana Rai (Nepal)
17 February 2025
17:30 UTC+5:45

Nepal	1–0	Kyrgyzstan
Chaudhary 10'	Report

Dasharath Rangasala, Kathmandu
Attendance: 7,416
Referee: Kanika Barman (India)

20 February 2025
13:30 UTC+5:45

Kyrgyzstan	0–5	Myanmar
	Report	Yoon Wadi Hlaing 2', 41'; Sandar Lin 30'; May Htet Lu 36', 49'

Dasharath Rangasala, Kathmandu
Referee: Umesh Bidari (Nepal)
20 February 2025
17:30 UTC+5:45

Lebanon	0–1	Nepal
	Report	S. Bhandari 42'

Dasharath Rangasala, Kathmandu
Attendance: 11,473
Referee: Ranjita Devi Tekcham (India)

23 February 2025
13:30 UTC+5:45

Kyrgyzstan	0–2	Lebanon
	Report	Maalouf 13'; Mehanna 22'

Dasharath Rangasala, Kathmandu
Referee: Anjana Rai (Nepal)
23 February 2025
17:30 UTC+5:45

Nepal	2–2	Myanmar
Rana Magar 11'; S. Bhandari 41'	Report	May Htet Lu 6'; Myat Noe Khin 16'

Dasharath Rangasala, Kathmandu
Attendance: 12,605
Referee: Kanika Barman (India)

== Final ==
26 February 2025
18:00 UTC+5:45

Myanmar	2–0	Nepal
Yu Per Khaing 62'; Win Theingi Tun 64'	Report

Dasharath Rangasala, Kathmandu
Referee: Ranjita Devi Tekcham (India)

== Goalscorers ==
There were 19 goals scored in 7 matches, for an average of 2.71 goals per match.

3 goals

- (Myanmar) May Htet Lu

2 goals

- (Myanmar) Win Theingi Tun
- (Myanmar) Yoon Wadi Hlaing
- (Nepal) Sabitra Bhandari

1 goal

- (Lebanon) Lili Iskandar
- (Lebanon) Christy Maalouf
- (Lebanon) Mya Mehanna
- (Myanmar) Myat Noe Khin
- (Myanmar) San Thaw Thaw
- (Myanmar) Sandar Lin
- (Myanmar) Shwe Yee Tun
- (Myanmar) Yu Per Khaing
- (Nepal) Bimala Chaudhary
- (Nepal) Sabita Rana Magar
