= Anita Basnet =

Nepalese footballer (born 1994)

Personal information
- Date of birth: 1994 (age 31–32)
- Place of birth: Samdu, Terhathum, Nepal
- Position: Forward

Team information
- Current team: Red Eagles S.C.
- Number: 28

Senior career*
| Years | Team | Apps | (Gls) |
- APF Club
| 2018–2020 | Sethu FC | 8 | (1) |
| 2022–2023 | Lords FA | 5 | (0) |
| 2023–2025 | APF Club | | |
| 2026– | Red Eagles S.C. | | |

International career
| | Nepal | 27 | (8) |
- * Club domestic league appearances and goals

Anita Basnet (Nepali: अनिता बस्नेत) is a Nepalese professional footballer who plays for Red Eagles S.C. and represents the Nepal women's national football team.

== International goals ==
As of match played on 21 October 2024

Appearances and goals by year
| National team | Year | Apps | Goals |
|---|---|---|---|
Nepal
| Nepal | 2019 | | 2 |
| Nepal | 2022 | | 3 |
| Nepal | 2024 | | 1 |
| Nepal | 2025 | | 2 |
| Total | | | 8 |

Scores and results list Nepal's goal tally first, score column indicates score after each Basnet goal.

| No. | Date | Venue | Opponent | Score | Result | Competition |
|---|---|---|---|---|---|---|
| 1. | 13 February 2019 | Kalinga Stadium, Bhubaneswar, India | Iran | 1–0 | 3–0 | 2019 Gold Cup |
| 2. | 20 March 2019 | Sahid Rangsala, Biratnagar, Nepal | Sri Lanka | 2–0 | 4–0 | 2019 SAFF Women's Championship |
| 3. | 6 September 2022 | Dasharath Rangasala, Kathmandu, Nepal | Bhutan | 3–0 | 4–0 | 2022 SAFF Women's Championship |
| 4. | 6 September 2022 | Dasharath Rangasala, Kathmandu, Nepal | Bhutan | 4–0 | 4–0 | 2022 SAFF Women's Championship |
| 5. | 19 September 2022 | Dasharath Rangasala, Kathmandu, Nepal | Bangladesh | 1–3 | 1–3 | 2022 SAFF Women's Championship |
| 6. | 20 February 2024 | King Abdullah Sports City Reserve Stadium, Jeddah | Syria | 2–1 | 4–1 | 2024 WAFF Women's Championship |
| 7. | 29 June 2025 | Milliy Stadium, Tashkent, Uzbekistan | Laos | 1–0 | 9–0 | 2026 AFC Women's Asian Cup qualification |
| 8. | 29 June 2025 | Milliy Stadium, Tashkent, Uzbekistan | Laos | 8–0 | 9–0 | 2026 AFC Women's Asian Cup qualification |

== Honours ==
=== Club ===
Sethu FC

- Indian Women's League: 2018–19
