= Preeti Rai =

Nepali footballer (born 1989)

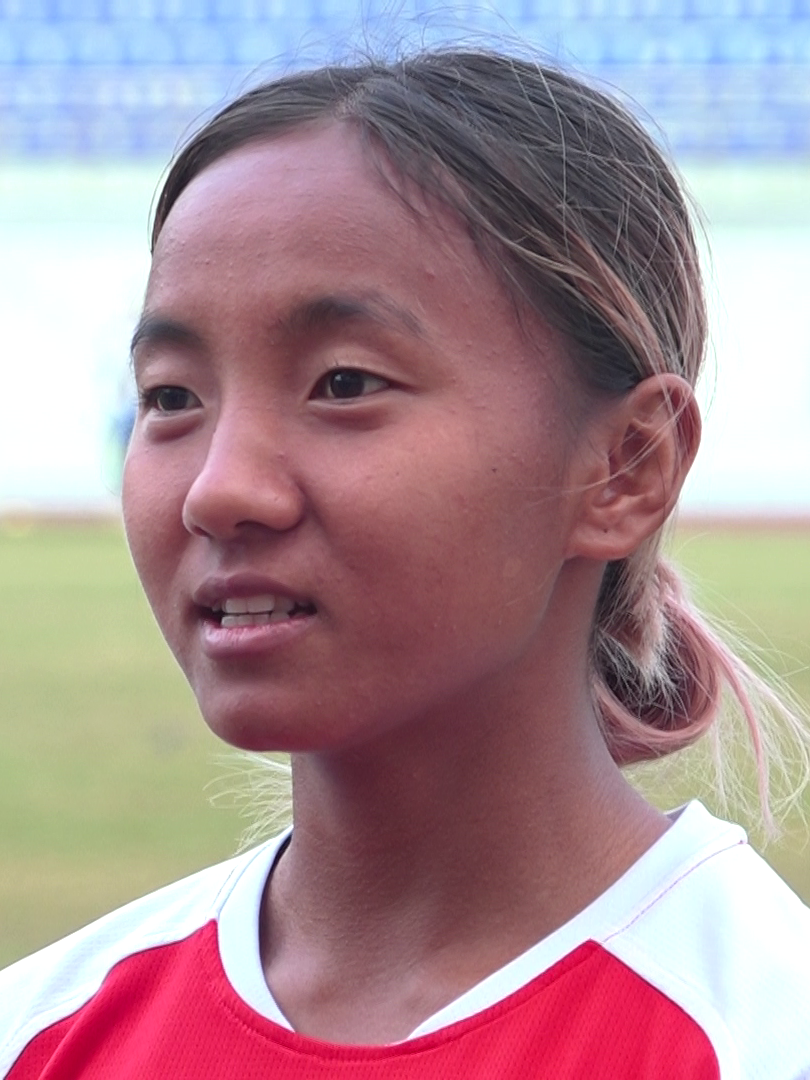

Personal information
- Full name: Preeti Kulung Rai
- Date of birth: 21 November 2004 (age 21)
- Place of birth: Kathmandu, Nepal
- Height: 4 ft 10 in (1.47 m)
- Position: Midfielder

Team information
- Current team: Preah Khan Reach Svay Rieng

Senior career*
Years	Team	Apps	(Gls)
- APF FC
2023–2024	Kickstart	8	(0)
2025–2026	Etihad	4	(1)
2026–	Preah Khan Reach Svay Rieng	1	(2)

International career^{‡}
2021–	Nepal	21	(5)
Medal record
Women's football
Representing Nepal
SAFF Women's Championship
Runner-up	2022 Nepal
Runner-up	2024 Nepal
WAFF Women's Championship
Runner-up	2024 Saudi Arabia
- * Club domestic league appearances and goals as of 27 April 2026 ‡ National team caps and goals as of 31 August 2025

Preeti Kulung Rai (Nepali: प्रीति राई; born 21 November 2004) is a Nepalese professional footballer who plays as a midfielder for Preah Khan Reach Svay Rieng and Nepal national women's team.

== Early life ==
Rai is a native of Solukhumbu District, Nepal. She is the daughter of Chandra Prasad Rai and Gyanmaya Rai. She attended Sharada Academy in Nepal. She started playing football at the age of six.

== Club career ==
In 2025, she joined Jordan Women's Pro League club Etihad Club.

== International career ==
Rai made a remarkable debut for Nepal's national women's football team in a FIFA Friendly match against Bangladesh at Dasharath Stadium on 9 September 2021. At just 16 years old, Rai showed her skills and made an immediate impact by scoring a stunning goal in the 22nd minute.

Rai was part of Nepal women's national football team at the 2024 WAFF Women's Championship. Nepal team finished second place in the tournament.

== Style of play ==
Preeti Rai is primarily known for her role as a midfielder, where her playing style is defined by her playmaking abilities, vision, and technical skills. She has an impressive ability to control the game from the midfield, making precise passes and creating scoring opportunities for her teammates. Her skill in providing accurate and timely assists has made her a valuable asset to both her club and the Nepal National Women's Team.

== Statistics ==
=== International goals ===
As of match played on 21 October 2024

Appearances and goals by national team and year
National team	Year	Apps	Goals
Nepal
Nepal	2021		1
Nepal	2024		4
Total			5

Scores and results list Nepal's goal tally first, score column indicates score after each Rai goal.
As of match played on 21 October 2024

No.	Date	Venue	Opponent	Score	Result	Competition
1.	9 September 2021	Dasharath Rangasala, Kathmandu, Nepal	Bangladesh	2–1	2–1	FIFA Friendly
2.	27 February 2024	Prince Abdullah Al-Faisal Sports City, Jeddah, Saudi Arabia	Lebanon	2–1	2–1	2024 WAFF Women's Championship
3.	21 October 2024	Dasharath Rangasala, Kathmandu, Nepal	Maldives	1–0	11–0	2024 SAFF Women's Championship
4.	21 October 2024	Dasharath Rangasala, Kathmandu, Nepal	Maldives	7–0	11–0	2024 SAFF Women's Championship
5.	21 October 2024	Dasharath Rangasala, Kathmandu, Nepal	Maldives	10–0	11–0	2024 SAFF Women's Championship
