= Nepal women's national football team =

Women's national association football team representing Nepal

Nepal
- Nickname: Gorkhali Chelis
- Association: All Nepal Football Association (ANFA)
- Confederation: AFC (Asia)
- Sub-confederation: SAFF (South Asia)
- Head coach: Nabin Neupane
- Captain: Sabitra Bhandari
- Most caps: Sabitra Bhandari (61)
- Top scorer: Sabitra Bhandari (68)
- Home stadium: Various
- FIFA code: NEP
First colours	Second colours

FIFA ranking
- Current: 89 ▼1 (20 October 2026)
- Highest: 87 (August – December 2025)
- Lowest: 119 (September 2015)

First international
- Nepal 0–1 Hong Kong (Hong Kong; 14 December 1986)

Biggest win
- Nepal 13–0 Afghanistan (Cox's Bazar, Bangladesh; 14 December 2010)

Biggest defeat
- Japan 14–0 Nepal (Hong Kong; 24 December 1989); Japan 14–0 Nepal (Barotac Nuevo, Philippines; 12 November 1999)

Asian Cup
- Appearances: 3 (first in 1986)
- Best result: Group stage (1986, 1989, 1999)

SAFF Championship
- Appearances: 8 (first in 2010)
- Best result: Runners-up (2010, 2012, 2014, 2019, 2022, 2024)
Medal record
SAFF Women's Championship
Silver medal – second place	2010 Bangladesh
Silver medal – second place	2012 Sri Lanka
Silver medal – second place	2014 Pakistan
Silver medal – second place	2019 Nepal
Silver medal – second place	2022 Nepal
Silver medal – second place	2024 Nepal
South Asian Games
Silver medal – second place	2010 Dhaka	Team
Silver medal – second place	2016 Guwahati & Shillong	Team
Silver medal – second place	2019 Kathmandu & Pokhara	Team
- Website: the-anfa.com

The Nepal women's national football team is controlled by the All Nepal Football Association and represents Nepal in international women's football competitions. The Women's Football Department has been developed to manage the women's football activities. The official motto of women's football in Nepal is "Football for Change". It is a member of the Asian Football Confederation and the South Asian Football Federation and has yet to qualify for the World Cup.

== History ==
=== Formation ===
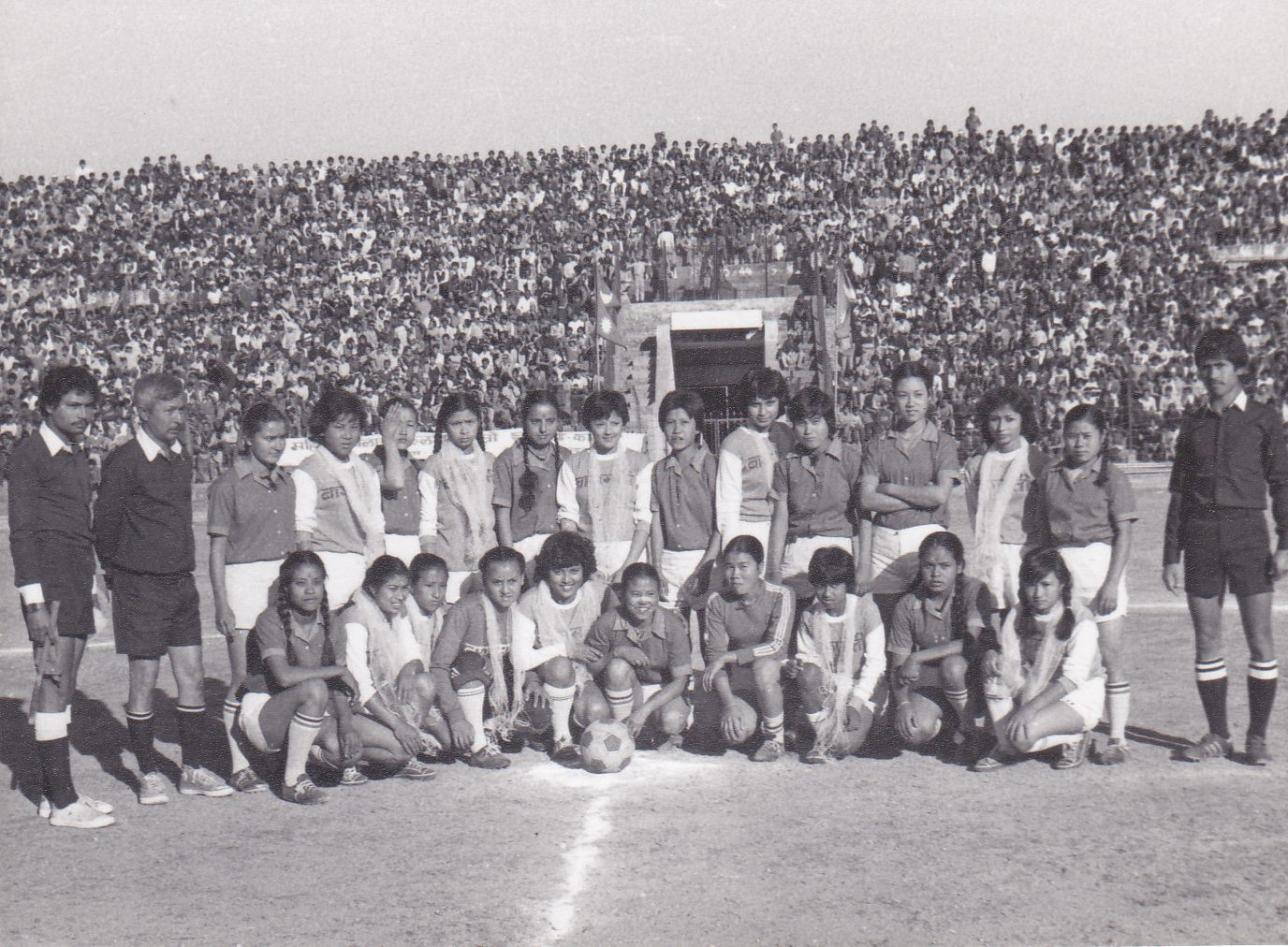
First international football game in the Nepali women's football in 1984

Nepal formed a women's national team in the mid-1980s and debuted in the 1986 AFC Women's Championship. During that tournament, Nepal played their first official match against Hong Kong (14 December 1986), which they lost 1–0. The Nepal women's side also participated in the final three phases of the Asian Cup in 1986, 1989 and 1999, never going beyond the group stages. Nepal proved to be in a difficult group with former champions Thailand, alongside Indonesia and Hong Kong, two relatively strong teams. As a result, Nepal had lost all three matches, two of them jarringly, while the match against Hong Kong proved to be a steady profit. In 1989 Nepal played again in the championship, against the same opponents, except that Thailand was substituted against Japan. This resulted in meagre points for Nepal, who lost every game by a wide margin, the smallest being a 0–3 defeat against Hong Kong.

Nepal's FIFA First Vice President was Kamal Thapa. Nepal's first woman captain was Rama Singh. When the Nepali women's football team was created, Kamal Thapa was the president of the All Nepal Football Association. Singh, who represented the Bagmati team, started playing in 1985. The national team's second captain was Kamala Hirachan who also represented the Gandaki team and the third women's team captain was Meera Chaudhary who represented the Naryani team. Singh later became the first newsreader in Nepali television history, and Chaudhary has held a rank of DSP in Nepal police. The first female international goal scorer of Nepal is Pema Dolma Lama, who scored a goal against Uzbekistan at the 1999 AFC Women's Championship held in Philippines.

=== Crisis years ===
As a result of the democracy uprising in 1990, there was an eight-year period without a women's national team. This negatively affected player recruitment, but nevertheless Nepal soon returned to international football during the Women's Asian Cup in 1999. Despite their return, the results were about the same as before the eight-year hiatus. The championship ended in the group stage with Japan, Thailand, Uzbekistan and the Philippines, where Nepal lost all four games. Since then, Nepal has not appeared in the Women's Asian cup. Former men's national team technical director, Holger Obermann served as the technical advisor for the Chelis during their 1999 campaign.

However, this did not mean that Nepal had not played football since 1999. The Mangladevi League, roughly a month-long women's football tourney, was set up trying to bring in women football players across the country. It was played in early 2000, in a league-cum-knockout format. It was an initiative taken by a single person, but was sadly discontinued after a year.

Nepal had a long period without matches, but they impressed many in the South Asian Games in 2010, where they reached the final after beating several opponents by a wide margin. in. In the final, they lost narrowly 1–3 against the heavy favorite India. This gave the national team much-needed recognition. The 11th South Asian Games were also the first to host a women's football event as well. In the opening match of the 2010 South Asian Games, Nepal's U-23 women's team faced hosts Bangladesh, where they won with a single goal. The second match against Sri Lanka proved to be more illustrious as victory came in the form of 8 goals while holding a clean sheet. However, the scoring spree was short-lived as the third group-stage match against India saw a heavy 0–5 loss. Nevertheless, Nepal had done enough to qualify for the second round (semi-finals) against Pakistan which they won with a resounding 7–0 scoreline. This meant that Nepal would face a difficult rematch against India in the final, although any result would ensure a medal at the very least for the Chelis. Despite finally ending the scoring drought against India, the game was lost 1–3. Despite putting on a valiant performance, the Chelis returned home with a silver medal which came to the delight of many supporters of Nepali football due to the rarity of the occasion.

=== Regeneration ===
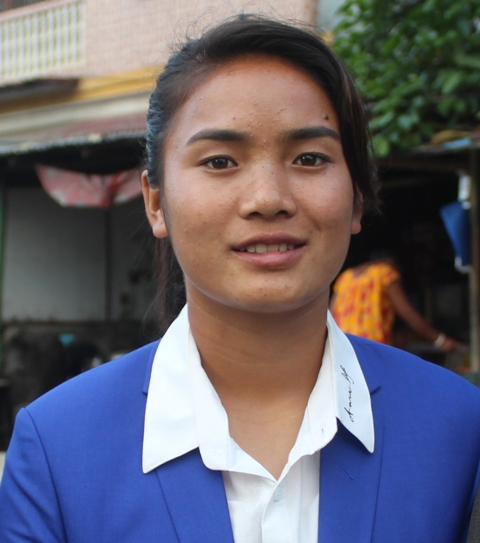
Anjila Tumbapo Subba played numerous games for Nepal.

The regeneration of women's football in Nepal was first realised when after the national leagues were reinstated in 2009. The women's national team prior to this hadn't played an international game for 5 years. Nevertheless, the Chelis began training for two upcoming major international tournaments in the following year. In 2010, Nepali women footballers returned with two runner-up trophies, one from the 11th South Asian Games, and the other from the SAFF Women's Football Championship. Despite limited training, resources and less attention compared to the men's team, the women's team performed exceedingly well. In the South Asian Games, they defeated Sri Lanka 8–0, and in SAFF they thrashed Afghanistan 13–0 and Pakistan 11–0. Striker Anu Lama was the star of SAFF, scoring three hat-tricks to be declared the best player of the tournament. However, the team was defeated 0–5 by India in the SAG final, but it was a much more closely fought match when they lost 0–1 to the same team in the SAFF final recently.

Following the team's 2010 regeneration, the women's side's FIFA ranking rose by 22 places.

== Team image ==
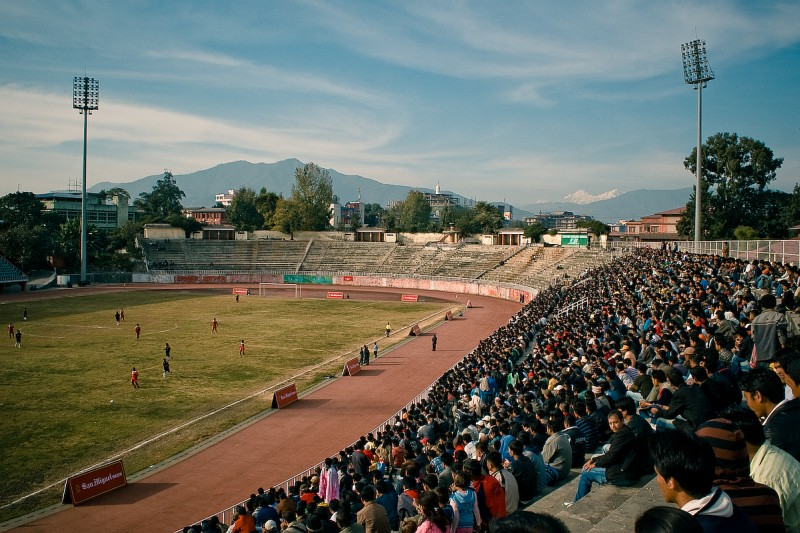
The Dasharath Rangasala in 2008

=== Nicknames ===
The Nepal women's national football team has also been known as the "Nepali Chelis".

=== Home stadium ===
The team's home stadium is the Dasarath Rangasala Stadium, a multi-purpose stadium in central Kathmandu. It is shared with the Nepal men's national football team. Holding 25,000 spectators, of which 5,000 seated, the Dasarath Rangasala is the biggest stadium in Nepal. It is named after Dashrath Chand, one of Nepal's martyrs. Prior to the 2013 SAFF Championship in Nepal, the Dasarath Rangasala underwent heavy renovation that saw several improvements such as the expansion of seats from 20,000 to 25,000.

== FIFA World Ranking ==
As of 15 March 2026

Nepal's FIFA World Ranking history
Year	2003	2010	2011	2012	2013	2014	2015	2016	2017	2018	2019	2020	2021	2022	2023	2024	2025
FIFA World Ranking	103	116	116	108	94	107	114	105	91	108	97	92	103	103	105	103	89
AFC Ranking	–	22	23	23	24	21	24	20	22	20	21	16	21	21	20	20	15

== Results and fixtures ==
The following is a list of match results in the last 12 months, as well as any future matches that have been scheduled.

Legend

Win Draw Lose Fixture

=== 2025 ===
24 October Friendly	Nepal	0–3	Iran	Shillong, India
18:00 UTC+5:30			Didar 49'; Ghanbari 52'; Behesht 57'	Stadium: Jawaharlal Nehru Stadium; Referee: Choki Om (Bhutan)

27 October Friendly	India	1–2	Nepal	Shillong, India
18:00 UTC+5:30	Shirvoikar 81'		Bhandari 2', 63'	Stadium: Jawaharlal Nehru Stadium; Referee: Pansa Chaisanit (Thailand)

29 October Unofficial friendly	India	1–1 (0–3 p)	Nepal	Gangtok, India
16:45 UTC+5:30	Guguloth 30'	Report	Ghising 45+2'	Stadium: Paljor Stadium; Referee: Meera Tamang (Bhutan)
	Penalties
	Priyadharshini (penalty missed); Santosh (penalty missed); Oraon (penalty missed)		S. Magar (penalty scored); Ghising (penalty scored); Basnet (penalty missed); Thokar (penalty scored)

26 November Friendly	Indonesia	2–1	Nepal	Yogyakarta, Indonesia
19:30 UTC+7	Gea 58'; Aulia 67'	Report	Vivi 20' (o.g.)	Stadium: Maguwoharjo Stadium

2 December Friendly	Nepal	0–1	Chinese Taipei	Yogyakarta, Indonesia
19:30 UTC+7		Report	Huang Ke-Sin 53'	Stadium: Maguwoharjo Stadium

=== 2026 ===
25 May 2026 2026 SAFF GS	Bhutan	0–1	Nepal	Margao, Goa
16:30		Report	Rana 23'	Stadium: Jawaharlal Nehru Stadium; Referee: Tekcham Ranjita (India)

31 May 2026 2026 SAFF GS	Nepal	2–0	Sri Lanka	Margao, Goa
16:30	Ghishing 45+3'; Nagarkote 62'	Report		Stadium: Jawaharlal Nehru Stadium; Attendance: 761; Referee: Ranjita Devi Tekcham (India)

3 June 2026 2026 SAFF SF	Nepal	1–2	Bangladesh	Margao, Goa
16:00	Gita 22'	Report	R. Chakma 45+1'; Sagorika 90+3'	Stadium: Jawaharlal Nehru Stadium; Attendance: 289; Referee: Om Choki (Bhutan)

== Coaching staff ==
As of October 2025

Position	Name
Head coach	(Nepal) Nabin Neupane
Assistant coach	(Nepal) Raj Kumar KC (Nepal) Bhagwati Thapa
Goalkeeping coach	(Nepal) Suraj Kumar Lama
Medical officer	(Nepal) Dr. Alisha Rai
Physio	(Nepal) Shila Giri
Kit manager	(Nepal) Bikash Gurung
Team official	Vacant
Media manager	(Nepal) Krishna Singh Lothyal
Team Manager	(Nepal) Bindra Dewan

=== Coaching history ===
List of head coaches
Name	Period	Achievements
(Nepal) Dhruba KC	2010–2012	2010 SAFF Women's Championship: (silver) Runner-up; 2012 SAFF Women's Championship: (silver) Runner-up
(Nepal) Hari Khadka	2018–2019	
(Australia) Gary Phillips As Technical Director	2019–2021	
(Australia) Gary Phillips	2021–2022	
(Nepal) Kumar Thapa	2022	
(Nepal) Rajendra Tamang	2024–2025	2024 WAFF Women's Championship: (silver) Runner-up; 2024 SAFF Women's Championship: (silver) Runner-up; 2025 International Women's Championship: (silver) Runner-up
(Belgium) Patrick De Wilde	2025	
(Nepal) Nabin Neupane	2025–present	

== Players ==
=== Current squad ===
The following players were called up for the final squad for the 2026 SAFF Women's Championship in May 2026.

No.	Pos.	Player	Date of birth (age)	Caps	Goals	Club
	GK	Anjana Rana Magar	January 17, 2002 (age 24)	12	0	(All Nepal Football Association) APF
	GK	Anjila Tumbapo Subba	May 28, 1996 (age 30)	58	0	(All Nepal Football Association) APF
	GK	Usha Nath	January 23, 2001 (age 25)	2	0	(All Nepal Football Association) Nepal Police
	DF	Bimala B.K.	January 23, 2002 (age 24)	15	0	(Bangladesh Football Federation) Rajshahi Stars
	DF	Gita Rana	September 21, 1996 (age 30)	58	4	(Bhutan Football Federation) Transport United
	DF	Hira Kumari Bhujel	December 26, 1995 (age 30)	–	–	(Football Association of Malaysia) Red Eagles
	DF	Puja Rana	March 28, 2001 (age 25)	17	1	(Bhutan Football Federation) Thimphu City
	DF	Samikshya Ghimire	December 26, 1999 (age 26)	15	0	(Bhutan Football Federation) Transport United
	DF	Nisha Thokar	February 1, 2001 (age 25)	7	1	(Football Association of Malaysia) Red Eagles
	DF	Pratiksha Chaudhary	October 29, 2004 (age 22)	0	0	(Bhutan Football Federation) Transport United
	DF	Sabina Chaudhary	August 30, 2005 (age 21)	1	0	(All Nepal Football Association) Nepal Police
	MF	Anita Basnet	February 9, 1994 (age 32)	58	7	(Football Association of Malaysia) Red Eagles
	MF	Preeti Rai	November 20, 2004 (age 22)	21	5	(Football Federation of Cambodia) Preah Khan Reach Svay Rieng
	MF	Dipa Shahi	November 28, 1999 (age 26)	–	–	(Bhutan Football Federation) Transport United
	MF	Saru Limbu	March 6, 1999 (age 27)	50	3	(Bhutan Football Federation) Paro
	MF	Renuka Nagarkote	April 16, 1995 (age 31)	56	0	(Bhutan Football Federation) Paro
	MF	Anita K.C.	January 5, 1997 (age 29)	30	1	(Bhutan Football Federation) Transport United
	MF	Anita Lamjel	July 24, 2004 (age 22)	3	0	(All Nepal Football Association) Nepal Army
	MF	Birshana Chaudhary	January 29, 2006 (age 20)	–	–	(All Nepal Football Association) Nepal Police
	FW	Rashmi Kumari Ghising	June 15, 2002 (age 24)	24	3	(Bhutan Football Federation) Transport United
	FW	Rekha Poudel	January 7, 2001 (age 25)	23	12	(Football Federation of Cambodia) Phnom Penh Crown
	FW	Mina Deuba	January 29, 2006 (age 20)	–	–	(Bhutan Football Federation) Transport United
	FW	Purnima Rai	June 29, 2006 (age 20)	–	–	(All Nepal Football Association) Nepal Police

=== Recent call-ups ===
The following footballers were part of a national selection in the past twelve months, but are not part of the current squad.

Pos.	Player	Date of birth (age)	Caps	Goals	Club	Latest call-up
MF	Renuka Hamal	August 20, 1998 (age 28)			(Nepal) APF	v. Chinese Taipei, 2 December 2025
MF	Sajani Thokar	November 28, 2000 (age 25)	–	–	Nepal Police	v. Chinese Taipei, 2 December 2025
^{INJ} Withdrew due to injury^{PRE} Preliminary squad / standby^{RET} Retired from the national team^{SUS} Serving suspension^{WD} Player withdrew from the squad due to non-injury issue.

== Competitive record ==
=== FIFA Women's World Cup ===
FIFA Women's World Cup record										Qualification record						
Year	Round	Pos	Pld	W	D	L	GF	GA	GD	Pld	W	D	L	GF	GA	GD
(China) 1991	Did not enter									Did not enter						
(Sweden) 1995	Did not enter									Did not enter						
(United States) 1999	Did not enter									Did not enter						
(United States) 2003	Did not enter									Did not enter						
(China) 2007	Did not enter									Did not enter						
(Germany) 2011	Did not enter									Did not enter						
(Canada) 2015	Did not enter									Did not enter						
(France) 2019	Did not enter									Did not enter						
(Australia) (New Zealand) 2023	Did not qualify									Via AFC Women's Asian Cup						
(Brazil) 2027	Did not qualify									Via AFC Women's Asian Cup						
(Costa Rica) (Jamaica) (Mexico) (United States) 2031	To be determined									To be determined						
(United Kingdom) 2035	To be determined									To be determined						
Total	0/10	–	–	–	–	–	–	–	–	–	–	–	–	–	–	–

=== Olympic Games ===
Summer Olympics record									Qualification record						
Year	Round	Pld	W	D*	L	GF	GA	GD	Pld	W	D*	L	GF	GA	GD
(United States) 1996	Did not enter								Did not enter						
(Australia) 2000	Did not enter								Did not enter						
(Greece) 2004	Did not enter								Did not enter						
(China) 2008	Did not enter								Did not enter						
(United Kingdom) 2012	Did not enter								Did not enter						
(Brazil) 2016	Did not enter								Did not enter						
(Japan) 2020	Did not qualify								6	1	3	2	7	10	−3
(France) 2024	Did not qualify								2	0	0	2	1	7	−6
(United States) 2028	Did not qualify								Via AFC Women's Asian Cup						
(Australia) 2032	To be determined								To be determined						
Total	0/9	–	–	–	–	–	–	–	8	1	3	4	7	17	−10

*Denotes draws includes knockout matches decided on penalty kicks.

=== AFC Women's Asian Cup ===
AFC Women's Asian Cup record									Qualification record						
Year	Result	Pld	W	D*	L	GF	GA	GD	Pld	W	D*	L	GF	GA	GD
(Hong Kong) 1975	Did not exist								No Qualification						
(Taiwan) 1977	Did not exist								No Qualification						
(India) 1980	Did not exist								No Qualification						
(Hong Kong) 1981	Did not exist								No Qualification						
(Thailand) 1983	Did not exist								No Qualification						
(Hong Kong) 1986	Group stage	3	0	0	3	0	12	−12	No Qualification						
(Hong Kong) 1989	Group stage	3	0	0	3	0	25	−25	No Qualification						
(Japan) 1991	Did not enter								No Qualification						
(Malaysia) 1993	Did not enter								No Qualification						
(Malaysia) 1995	Did not enter								No Qualification						
(China) 1997	Did not enter								No Qualification						
(Philippines) 1999	Group stage	4	0	0	4	1	30	−29	No Qualification						
(Chinese Taipei) 2001	Did not enter								No Qualification						
(Thailand) 2003	Did not enter								No Qualification						
(Australia) 2006	Did not enter								Did not enter						
(Vietnam) 2008	Did not enter								Did not enter						
(China) 2010	Did not enter								Did not enter						
(Vietnam) 2014	Did not enter								Did not enter						
(Jordan) 2018	Did not enter								Did not enter						
(India) 2022	Did not qualify								2	0	1	1	1	2	−1
(Australia) 2026	Did not qualify								3	2	1	0	20	3	+17
(Uzbekistan) 2029	To be determined								To be determined						
Total	3/21	10	0	0	10	1	67	−66	5	2	2	1	21	5	+16

*Draws include knockout matches decided on penalty kicks.

=== Asian Games ===
Asian Games record
Year	Round	Position	GP	W	D	L	GF	GA	GD
(China) 1990	Did not enter								
(Japan) 1994	Did not enter								
(Thailand) 1998	Did not enter								
(South Korea) 2002	Did not enter								
(Qatar) 2006	Did not enter								
(China) 2010	Did not enter								
(South Korea) 2014	Did not enter								
(Indonesia) 2018	Did not enter								
(China) 2022	Group stage	11th	3	0	1	2	1	11	−10
(Japan) 2026	Did not qualify								
Total	1/9	11th	3	0	1	2	1	11	−10

*Draws include knockout matches decided on penalty kicks.

=== SAFF Women's Championship ===
SAFF Women's Championship record
Year	Result	Pld	W	D*	L	GF	GA	GD
(Bangladesh) 2010	Runners-up	5	4	0	1	34	1	+33
(Sri Lanka) 2012	Runners-up	5	4	0	1	24	4	+20
(Pakistan) 2014	Runners-up	5	4	0	1	17	6	+11
(India) 2016	Semi Final	4	3	0	1	19	3	+16
(Nepal) 2019	Runners-up	4	3	0	1	11	3	+8
(Nepal) 2022	Runners-up	4	3	0	1	12	1	+11
(Nepal) 2024	Runners-up	5	3	1	1	19	3	+16
(India) 2026	Semi Final	3	2	0	1	4	2	+2
Total	8/8	35	26	1	8	140	23	+117

*Draws include knockout matches decided on penalty kicks.

=== South Asian Games ===
South Asian Games record
Year	Result	Pld	W	D*	L	GF	GA	GD	Pts
(Bangladesh) 2010	Silver	5	3	0	2	17	9	+8	9
(India) 2016	Silver	5	3	1	1	9	4	+5	10
(Nepal) 2019	Silver	4	2	0	2	4	3	+1	6
(Pakistan) 2026	To be determined								
Total	3/3	14	8	1	5	30	16	+14	25

*Draws include knockout matches decided on penalty kicks.

=== WAFF Women's Championship ===
WAFF Women's Championship
Year	Result	Pld	W	D*	L	GF	GA	GD
(Saudi Arabia) 2024	Runners-up	5	4	1	0	17	4	+13
Total	1/1	5	4	1	0	17	4	+13

*Draws include knockout matches decided on penalty kicks.

=== Other tournaments ===
Host/year/tournament name	Result	Pld	W	D*	L	GF	GA	GD
(India) 2019 Women's Gold Cup	Runners-up	4	2	0	2	6	7	–1
(Kyrgyzstan) 2019 Nadezhda Cup	Runners-up	4	2	0	2	11	7	+4
(Nepal) 2025 International Women's Championship	Runners-up	4	2	1	1	4	4	0

== Head-to-head record ==
As of 5 July 2025, after the match against Uzbekistan.

Key
More wins
Equal wins/losses ratio
More losses

Nepal women's national football team head-to-head records
Opponents	First played	Pld	W	D	L	GF	GA	GD	Confederation
Afghanistan	2010	2	2	0	0	20	1	+19	AFC
Bangladesh	2010	13	6	5	2	18	9	+8	AFC
Bhutan	2014	5	4	1	0	27	0	+27	AFC
Hong Kong	1986	3	0	1	2	0	4	−4	AFC
India	2010	19	3	5	11	14	40	−26	AFC
Indonesia	1986	3	1	0	2	2	15	−13	AFC
Iran	2019	2	1	0	1	3	3	0	AFC
Iraq	2024	1	1	0	0	5	0	+5	AFC
Japan	1989	3	0	0	3	0	36	−36	AFC
Jordan	2024	1	0	1	0	2	2	0	AFC
Kuwait	2013	1	1	0	0	8	0	+8	AFC
Kyrgyzstan	2019	2	2	0	0	9	2	+7	AFC
Laos	2025	1	1	0	0	9	0	+9	AFC
Lebanon	2024	2	2	0	0	3	1	+2	AFC
Malaysia	2016	3	1	1	1	3	5	−2	AFC
Maldives	2010	6	6	0	0	36	0	+36	AFC
Myanmar	2018	6	0	2	4	5	14	−9	AFC
Pakistan	2010	4	4	0	0	29	0	+29	AFC
Palestine	2024	1	1	0	0	4	0	+4	AFC
Philippines	1999	2	0	0	2	1	7	−6	AFC
Qatar	2013	2	2	0	0	9	0	+9	AFC
Sri Lanka	2010	10	10	0	0	44	0	+44	AFC
Syria	2024	1	1	0	0	4	1	+3	AFC
Tajikistan	2019	1	1	0	0	1	0	+1	AFC
Thailand	1986	3	0	0	3	0	12	−12	AFC
Uzbekistan	1999	4	0	1	3	6	14	−8	AFC
Vietnam	2023	3	0	0	3	1	9	−8	AFC
27 Countries	1986	104	50	17	37	263	175	+88	FIFA

== Honours ==
=== Regional ===
- SAFF Women's Championship
  - Runners-up (6): 2010, 2012, 2014, 2019, 2022, 2024
- SAG Games
  - Runners-up (3): 2010, 2016, 2019
- WAFF Women's Championship
  - Runners-up (1): 2024

== See also ==
- Football in Nepal
- Nepal women's national under-20 football team
- Nepal women's national under-17 football team
