= Gita Rana =

Nepalese footballer

Personal information
- Full name: Gita Rana
- Date of birth: 21 September 1996 (age 30)
- Place of birth: Bardiya District, Nepal
- Height: 1.64 m (5 ft 5 in)
- Position: Defender

Senior career*
Years	Team	Apps	(Gls)
2015–2020	APF		
2020–2021	Masha United	4	(1)
2023–2024	Sethu	12	(0)
2024–2026	APF		
2026	Transport United Ladies		

International career
2016–	Nepal	15	(5)
- * Club domestic league appearances and goals

Gita Rana (Nepali: गिता राना; born 21 September 1996) is a Nepalese professional footballer who plays as a defender. She is also a member of the Nepal national team.

== International career ==
Rana made her international debut against Malaysia in a friendly match in 2016.

== International goals ==
Scores and results list Nepal's goal tally first.

List of international goals
No.	Date	Venue	Opponent	Score	Result	Competition
1.	24 February 2024	King Abdullah Sports City, Jeddah, Saudi Arabia	Palestine	4–0	4–0	2024 WAFF Women's Championship
2.	29 February 2024	Prince Abdullah Al-Faisal Sports City, Jeddah, Saudi Arabia	Jordan	2–2	2–2 (3–5 p)	2024 WAFF Women's Championship
3.	2 July 2025	Milliy Stadium, Tashkent, Uzbekistan	Sri Lanka	1–0	8–0	2026 AFC Women's Asian Cup qualification
4.	2 July 2025	Milliy Stadium, Tashkent, Uzbekistan	Sri Lanka	5–0	8–0	2026 AFC Women's Asian Cup qualification
5.	5 July 2025	Milliy Stadium, Tashkent, Uzbekistan	Uzbekistan	2–3	3–3 (2–4 p)	2026 AFC Women's Asian Cup qualification
6.	25 May 2026	Jawaharlal Nehru Stadium, Margao, India	Bhutan	1–0	1–0	2026 SAFF Women's Championship
7.	3 June 2026	Jawaharlal Nehru Stadium, Margao, India	Bangladesh	1–0	1–2	2026 SAFF Women's Championship
