= Sarah Abu-Sabbah =

Jordanian footballer

Personal information
- Full name: Sarah Basem Najem Abu-Sabbah
- Date of birth: 27 October 1999 (age 27)
- Place of birth: Düsseldorf, Germany
- Height: 1.70 m (5 ft 7 in)
- Position: Midfielder

Youth career
- 2014–2015: SGS Essen
- 2015–2016: Bayer Leverkusen U17

Senior career*
| Years | Team | Apps | (Gls) |
| 2014–2016 | Bayer Leverkusen | 1 | (0) |
| 2017–2018 | Bayer Leverkusen II | 22 | (22) |
| 2018–2021 | Borussia Mönchengladbach | 65 | (46) |
| 2022–2023 | SV Meppen | 9 | (0) |
| 2023–2025 | 1. FC Union Berlin | 38 | (48) |
| 2025–2026 | Viktoria Berlin | 18 | (5) |

International career^{‡}
| 2016 | Jordan U17 | 3 | (1) |
| 2017– | Jordan | 14 | (2) |
- * Club domestic league appearances and goals as of 30 July 2026 (UTC) ‡ National team caps and goals as of 16 July 2023 (UTC)

Sarah Basem Najem Abu-Sabbah (Arabic: سارة باسم نجم أبو صباح; born 27 October 1999) is a German-born Jordanian footballer. She has also played for the Jordan under-17 team that played in the 2016 FIFA U-17 World Cup and the senior national team of Jordan.

== Early life ==
Abu-Sabbah was born on 27 October 1999 in Düsseldorf, Germany. Her father migrated to Germany in 1994. She started playing football at age 4 with her mother registering her at a boys' football club.

== Youth career ==
Abu-Sabbah played for the youth teams of SGS Essen and Bayer Leverkusen at the U17 Bundesliga South/SouthWest division in the 2014–15 and 2015–16 season respectively.

== Club career ==
On 20 March 2016 she made her first appearance for the senior team of Bayer Leverkusen at the Frauen-Bundesliga, becoming the first female Jordanian to play in a league outside Jordan and the first Arab to play in the German women's league. She only played in one match. In 2017, she is playing for Bayer Leverkusen II of third-tier league Regionalliga West.

In June 2018, she joined Borussia Mönchengladbach, where she achieved the top scorer in the 2020–21 2. Bundesliga with 11 goals. She played for newly promoted Bundesliga club SV Meppen in 2022. In July 2023, she signed for 1. FC Union Berlin in the Regionalliga Nordost, contributing to their promotion to the 2. Bundesliga in her debut season at the club.

== International career ==
Abu-Sabbah first joined the Jordan U-17 team in 2015. At the 2016 FIFA U-17 World Cup which was hosted in Jordan, she debuted for the under-17 team of Jordan in the match against Spain. She later scored the first goal of the Jordan U-17 team in the tournament in their 1-4 loss to Mexico.

She debuted for the senior team in September 2017 in the 2–1 friendly win against Latvia in Riga. She was among the players that represented Jordan at the 2018 AFC Women's Asian Cup.

== International goals ==
Scores and results list Jordan's goal tally first.

| No. | Date | Venue | Opponent | Score | Result | Competition |
|---|---|---|---|---|---|---|
| 1. | 12 April 2018 | Amman International Stadium, Amman, Jordan | China | 1–1 | 1–8 | 2018 AFC Women's Asian Cup |
| 2. | 5 April 2023 | Pakhtakor Stadium, Tashkent, Uzbekistan | Timor-Leste | 3–0 | 3–1 | 2024 AFC Women's Olympic Qualifying Tournament |
| 3. | 27 February 2024 | Prince Abdullah Al-Faisal Sports City, Jeddah, Saudi Arabia | Palestine | 3–0 | 5–0 | 2022 WAFF Women's Championship |
