= India national under-23 football team =

Men's under-23 national association football team representing India

India U-23
- Nickname: The Blue Colts
- Association: AIFF
- Confederation: AFC (Asia)
- Sub-confederation: SAFF (South Asia)
- Head coach: Naushad Moosa
- Captain: Bikash Yumnam
- FIFA code: IND
First colours	Second colours

First international
- India 1–1 Oman (Hyderabad, India; 4 August 1991)

Biggest win
- India 6–0 Brunei (Doha, Qatar; 9 September 2025)

Biggest defeat
- Japan 5–0 India (Guangzhou, China; 16 November 2010); India 0–5 United Arab Emirates (Incheon, South Korea; 15 September 2014)

Asian Games
- Appearances: 5 (first in 2002)
- Best result: Round of 16 (2010, 2022)

SAFF Championship
- Appearances: 1 (first in 2009)
- Best result: Champions (2009)

South Asian Games
- Appearances: 4 (first in 2004)
- Best result: Runners–up (2004, 2016)
Medal record
Men's football
SAFF Championship
Gold medal – first place	2009 Bangladesh	Team
South Asian Games
Silver medal – second place	2016 Guwahati & Shillong	Team
Silver medal – second place	2004 Islamabad	Team

The India national under-23 football team represents India in international under-23 football and is controlled by the All India Football Federation (AIFF). A member of the Asian Football Confederation (AFC), the team is eligible to compete in the Summer Olympic Games, the AFC U-23 Asian Cup, and the Asian Games, subject to qualification.

Since only allowing under-23 sides to compete in the Olympic Games in 1992, India have never qualified for the summer games. The under-23 side have also never participated in the AFC U-23 Asian Cup while at best only making it to the round of 16 in the Asian Games.

== History ==
=== Asian Games ===
==== 2002 Busan Games ====
The under-23 side participated in their first ever tournament during the 2002 Asian Games in Busan, South Korea. They were put into a group with China, Turkmenistan, and Bangladesh. Their first match was against Bangladesh. India won 3–0 through a brace from future senior captain Baichung Bhutia and a strike from Renedy Singh. India played their second match two days later against Turkmenistan. They won 3–1. Bhutia again scored a brace while Abhishek Yadav scored the third goal as India ran out 3–1 winners. Unfortunately, in their final match against China, India could not find the net as they fell 2–0 and thus were knocked-out of the Asian Games.

==== 2006 Doha Games ====
During the 2006 Asian Games India were placed in a group with Iran, Hong Kong, and Maldives. In their first match against Hong Kong, India drew 1–1 with Pappachen Pradeep scoring the lone Indian goal. In their second match, India faced off against Maldives and won 2–1. Irungbam Surkumar Singh and Subhas Sumbhu Chakrobarty were the scorers for India that night. Finally, in their last match against Iran, India once again lost 2–0 and thus were once again knocked-out of the Asian Games.

==== 2010 Guangzhou Games ====
During the 2010 Asian Games in Guangzhou, China, India were placed in a group with Qatar, Kuwait Athletes, and Singapore. India lost their first match against the Kuwait Athletes 2–0 and then lost their second match against Qatar 2–1 with the lone India goal coming from Dharmaraj Ravanan. India went on to win their final match of the group stage against Singapore 4–1. Four players scored each goal, Jewel Raja, Balwant Singh, Jibon Singh, and Manish Maithani. The victory managed to help India finish in third-place which then helped India become the best third-place team out of all the other third-placed teams and thus qualified them for the Round of 16.

In the Round of 16, India took on powerhouse Japan at the Huangpu Sports Center. India went on to lose the match 5–0 with Kensuke Nagai scoring a brace and Ryohei Yamazaki, Kazuya Yamamura, and Kota Mizunuma scoring a goal each.

==== 2014 Incheon Games ====
For the 2014 Asian Games in Incheon, South Korea, India were placed in Group G with Jordan and the United Arab Emirates. In their first match against the United Arab Emirates, India went down 5–0. Seven days later, India were defeated by Jordan 2–0 to end their Asian Games participation.

==== 2022 Hangzhou Games ====
At the 2022 Asian Games in Hangzhou, China, India were placed in Group A with China, Myanmar and the Bangladesh. In the first match China defeated India 1–5. India won their next Match against Bangladesh 1–0 and played out a 1–1 draw with Myanmar. But in the Round of 16 they lost against Saudi Arabia 0–2.

=== Other tournaments ===
==== 2009 SAFF Championship ====
Before the 2009 SAFF Championship in Bangladesh, it was announced that India would send the under-23 side to the tournament. India were placed in Group A with Afghanistan, Maldives, and Nepal. In their first match against Afghanistan, India won 1–0 through Jeje Lalpekhlua. In their next match against Nepal, a Sushil Kumar Singh goal was the difference as India won again 1–0. Despite losing the last match of the group stage to Maldives 2–0 India were still through to the semi-finals.

India defeated Bangladesh in the semi-finals 1–0 through Sushil Kumar Singh. Finally, in the final against Maldives, India won through penalties 3–1 after finishing extra-time with the score at 0–0 to win the championship.

== Results and fixtures ==
Matches in the last 12 months, and future scheduled matches

Legend

Win Draw Loss Fixture

=== 2026 ===
28 March 2026 U-23 Tri-Nation Championship	India	5–0	Bhutan	Yupia, India
19:00 IST	R. M. Haobam 44'; Bhat 51', 81'; T. S. Haobam 79'; Ajsal 85'	Report		Stadium: Golden Jubilee Stadium

31 March 2026 U-23 Tri-Nation Championship	India	0–1	Tajikistan	Yupia, India
19:00 IST		Report	Azizbek 9'	Stadium: Golden Jubilee Stadium; Referee: Crystal John (India)

== Coaching staff ==
The current coaching staff of the team are:

Position	Name
Head coach	(India) Naushad Moosa
Assistant coach	(India) Noel Wilson
Goalkeeping coach	(India) Gumpe Rime

== Players ==
The following 24 players were called up for the 2026 Tri-Nation Series in March 2026.

Caps and goals are correct as of 31 March 2026, after the match against Tajikistan.

No.	Pos.	Player	Date of birth (age)	Caps	Goals	Club
1	GK	Mohanraj Kaithamalai	24 June 2004 (age 22)	3	0	(All India Football Federation) Chennaiyin
13	GK	Priyansh Dubey	22 July 2006 (age 20)	3	0	(All India Football Federation) Mohun Bagan SG
	GK	Dipesh Chauhan	20 November 2003 (age 22)	4	0	(All India Football Federation) NorthEast United
2	DF	Harsh Palande	26 January 2005 (age 21)	9	0	(All India Football Federation) Bengaluru
5	DF	Pramveer Singh	2 January 2005 (age 21)	8	0	(All India Football Federation) NorthEast United
19	DF	Ronney Kharbudon	2 March 2003 (age 23)	3	0	(All India Football Federation) Goa
22	DF	Ricky Meetei Haobam	30 August 2006 (age 20)	9	1	(All India Football Federation) Bengaluru
	DF	Dippendu Biswas	24 April 2003 (age 23)	3	0	(All India Football Federation) Mohun Bagan SG
	DF	Sanatomba Singh Yanglem	15 May 2006 (age 20)	1	0	(All India Football Federation) SC Delhi
	DF	Subham Bhattacharya	2 August 2006 (age 20)	0	0	(All India Football Federation) Odisha
4	MF	Lalrinliana Hnamte (captain)	29 April 2003 (age 23)	11	0	(All India Football Federation) SC Delhi
10	MF	Shivaldo Singh Chingangbam	13 June 2004 (age 22)	8	2	(All India Football Federation) Bengaluru
11	MF	Ebindas Yesudasan	19 April 2005 (age 21)	2	0	(All India Football Federation) Kerala Blasters
15	MF	Macarton Nickson	3 June 2005 (age 21)	7	0	(All India Football Federation) NorthEast United
16	MF	Tomba Singh Haobam	17 February 2003 (age 23)	2	1	(All India Football Federation) Inter Kashi
17	MF	Lalremtluanga Fanai	10 July 2002 (age 24)	8	0	(All India Football Federation) Bengaluru
21	MF	Vinith Venkatesh	31 July 2005 (age 21)	4	0	(All India Football Federation) Bengaluru
	MF	Zothanpuia	17 April 2005 (age 21)	0	0	(All India Football Federation) Mumbai City
7	FW	Suhail Ahmad Bhat	8 April 2005 (age 21)	8	5	(All India Football Federation) Mohun Bagan SG
8	FW	Muhammad Ajsal	28 March 2003 (age 23)	2	1	(All India Football Federation) Mumbai City
9	FW	Mohammed Sanan K	13 October 2003 (age 23)	10	1	(All India Football Federation) Jamshedpur
14	FW	Thoi Singh Huidrom	4 May 2004 (age 22)	3	0	(All India Football Federation) NorthEast United
18	FW	Adison Singh Thokchom	6 July 2004 (age 22)	2	0	(All India Football Federation) Mohammedan
20	FW	Lalthankima	16 September 2005 (age 21)	3	0	(All India Football Federation) Mohammedan

=== Recent callups ===
The following footballers were part of national selection in the past twelve months, but are not part of the current call-up.

Pos.	Player	Date of birth (age)	Caps	Goals	Club	Latest call-up
^{INJ} Player injuries; ^{PRE} Preliminary squad / standby; ^{OTH} Player withdrew from squad due to non-injury issue

=== Past squads ===
==== Asian Games ====
- 2002 Asian Games
- 2006 Asian Games
- 2010 Asian Games
- 2014 Asian Games
- 2022 Asian Games

== Competitive record ==
=== Summer Olympics ===
From 1908 to 1988, football at the Olympics was played by senior national teams. and between these years India national football team competed at all Games from 1948 to 1960. From 1992, FIFA allowed only U-23 national teams to play the tournament at the Olympics. Though U-23 players were allowed, the qualifying matches of 1992 Olympics to 2012 Olympics were played by the Senior national team of India but failed to qualify to the Olympics finals from 1992 to 2012. AFC started AFC U-23 Championship from 2013 which is now acted as the qualifying tournament for the Olympics for the Asian countries, where top three teams are allowed entry to Olympic finals. India is yet to qualify for the AFC U-23 Championship and thus also at Olympics since then.

Summer Olympics record									Summer Olympics qualification record					
Host/Year	Result	Position	Pld	W	T	L	GF	GA	Pld	W	T	L	GF	GA
1908−1988	See India national football team								See India national football team					
(Spain) 1992	Did not qualify								4	0	1	3	3	7
(United States) 1996	Did not qualify								4	2	0	2	8	7
(Australia) 2000	Did not qualify								2	0	1	1	0	2
(Greece) 2004	Did not qualify								2	1	0	1	1	2
(China) 2008	Did not qualify								8	0	3	5	3	13
(United Kingdom) 2012	Did not qualify								4	1	2	1	5	6
Since 2016, AFC U-23 Championship acted as the AFC qualifier (top 3 finishers)
(Brazil) 2016	Did not qualify								Did not qualify 2016 AFC U-23					
(Japan) 2020	Did not qualify								Did not qualify 2020 AFC U-23					
(France) 2024	Did not qualify								Did not qualify 2024 AFC U-23					
(United States) 2028	To be determined								To be determined					
Total	0/8	0 Titles	0	0	0	0	0	0	24	4	7	13	20	37

=== AFC U-23 Asian Cup ===
AFC U-23 Asian Cup was initially set to be held as AFC U-22 Championships in 2013 and its qualification matches in 2012, but the finals tournament was postponed to be played in January 2014. Till now, six championships held, in 2014, 2016, 2018, 2020, 2022 and 2024. However, India failed to qualify to any of the championships.

AFC U-23 Asian Cup record									AFC U-23 qualification record					
Year	Result	Position	Pld	W	T	L	GF	GA	Pld	W	T	L	GF	GA
(Oman) 2014	Did not qualify								5	2	1	2	11	10
(Qatar) 2016	Did not qualify								3	0	1	2	0	6
(China) 2018	Did not qualify								3	1	0	2	3	4
(Thailand) 2020	Did not qualify								2	0	0	2	0	5
(Uzbekistan) 2022	Did not qualify								3	1	1	1	2	2
(Qatar) 2024	Did not qualify								2	0	0	2	1	5
(Saudi Arabia) 2026	Did not qualify								3	2	0	1	9	2
(Japan) 2028	To be determined								To be determined					
Total	0/8	0 Titles	0	0	0	0	0	0	21	6	3	12	26	34

=== Asian Games ===
From 1951 to 1998 India competed in eleven Asian Games except the 1990 and the 1994 editions, and was competed by the senior national team. As the turn of the century, Olympic Council of Asia (OCA) changed the rules of participation of players in the Asian Games. Since the Football at the 2002 Asian Games, the age of the players is limited to 23 years while three over–aged players are allowed among each squad, similar to the rules for participation at the Summer Olympics. Though the senior team won the 1951 and the 1962 gold medal, and a bronze at the 1970 Asian Games but the India U-23 team has yet to win a medal at the Asian Games football tournament.

Asian Games record
Host/Year	Result	Position	Pld	W	D	L	GF	GA	Squad	Ref.
1951 – 1998	See India national football team									
(South Korea) 2002	Group stage	10th of 24	3	2	0	1	6	3	Squad	
(Qatar) 2006	Group stage	14th of 28	3	1	1	1	3	4	Squad	
(China) 2010	Round of 16	14th of 28	4	1	0	3	5	10	Squad	
(South Korea) 2014	Group stage	26th of 32	2	0	0	2	0	7	Squad	
(Indonesia) 2018	Indian Olympic Association did not allow team's participation									
(China) 2022	Round of 16	9th of 21	4	1	1	2	3	8	Squad	
(Japan) 2026	Did not participate									
Total	5/6	0 Titles	16	5	2	9	17	32	—	—

=== SAFF Championship ===
First time an Indian under-23 team participated in any championship organised by SAFF was in 2009. For the 2009 SAFF Championship, AIFF decided to send the under-23 team instead of the senior national team. Despite the underage team, India won the championship after beating the Maldives in the final.

In January 2025, SAFF announced the inaugural U-23 Championship, which will begin in 2026.

SAFF Championship record (Senior & Under-23)
Host/Year	Result	Position	Pld	W	D	L	GF	GA	Squad	Ref.
In the senior championship
(Bangladesh) 2009	Champions	1st	5	4	0	1	3	2	Squad	
In the under-23 championship
(Bangladesh) 2026	To be determined								Squad	
Total	1	1 Title	5	4	0	1	3	2	—	

=== South Asian Games ===
South Asian Games record
Year	Result	Position	Pld	W	T	L	GF	GA	Ref.
1984–1999	See India national football team								
(Pakistan) 2004	Played by India under-20 team								
(Sri Lanka) 2006	Played by India under-20 team								
(Bangladesh) 2010	Played by India under-20 team								
(India) 2016	Runners–up	2nd	4	2	0	2	7	5	
(Nepal) 2019	Did not participate								
(Pakistan) 2027	To be determined								
Total	1 Edition	0 Title	4	2	0	2	7	5	—

== Overall competitive records ==
As of 9 September 2025 vs Brunei (excluding friendlies & minor tournaments)

Competition	Pld	W	D	L	GF	GA	GD	Win%
Summer Olympics	0	0	0	0	0	0	+0	—
Asian Games	16	5	2	9	17	32	−15	31.25
South Asian Games	4	2	0	2	7	5	+2	50.00
AFC Olympic qualifiers	24	5	7	12	24	36	−12	20.83
AFC U-23 Asian Cup	0	0	0	0	0	0	+0	—
AFC U-23 Asian Cup Qualification	21	6	3	12	26	34	−8	28.57
SAFF U-23 Championship	0	0	0	0	0	0	+0	—
Total	65	18	12	35	74	107	−33	27.69

== Head-to-head record ==
As of 9 September 2025 vs Brunei (excluding friendlies & minor tournaments)

The following table shows India's head-to-head record in the official tournaments of Asian Games, South Asian Games, AFC U-23 Asian Cup (including qualifiers) and SAFF U-23 Championship.

Positive Record Neutral Record Negative Record

Opponent	Pld	W	D	L	GF	GA	GD	Win %
Bahrain	1	1	0	0	2	0	+2	100.00
Bangladesh	4	3	1	0	7	0	+7	75.00
Brunei	1	1	0	0	6	0	+6	100.00
China	3	0	0	3	2	9	−7	0.00
Hong Kong	1	0	1	0	1	1	+0	0.00
Iran	1	0	0	1	0	2	−2	0.00
Iraq	3	0	1	2	2	6	−4	0.00
Japan	1	0	0	1	0	5	−5	0.00
Jordan	1	0	0	1	0	2	−2	0.00
Kuwait	2	0	0	2	1	4	−3	0.00
Kyrgyzstan	1	0	1	0	0	0	+0	0.00
Lebanon	2	1	0	1	6	5	+1	50.00
Maldives	2	2	0	0	5	3	+2	100.00
Myanmar	5	1	4	0	6	5	+1	20.00
North Korea	2	0	0	2	1	4	−3	0.00
Nepal	1	0	0	1	1	2	−1	0.00
Oman	5	1	1	3	6	11	−5	20.00
Pakistan	2	2	0	0	5	2	+3	100.00
Qatar	5	0	1	4	4	9	−5	0.00
Saudi Arabia	1	0	0	1	0	2	−2	0.00
Singapore	1	1	0	0	4	1	+3	100.00
Sri Lanka	1	0	0	1	0	1	−1	0.00
Syria	3	0	0	3	0	7	−7	0.00
Tajikistan	1	0	0	1	0	2	−2	0.00
Thailand	4	1	1	2	3	4	−1	25.00
Turkmenistan	5	4	0	1	11	5	+6	80.00
United Arab Emirates	4	0	1	3	1	10	−9	0.00
Uzbekistan	2	0	0	2	0	5	−5	0.00
Total	65	18	12	35	74	107	−33	27.69

== Honours ==
- LG Cup
  - Winners (1): 2002
- SAFF Championship
  - Winners (1): 2009
- South Asian Games
  - Silver medal (1): 2016

== See also ==
- Football in India
- India national football team
- India women's national football team
- India national under-20 football team
- India national under-17 football team
- Sport in India
