= Tri-Nation Series (India) =

International football tournament

- Organiser(s): AIFF
- Founded: 2017; 9 years ago
- Region: India
- Teams: 3
- Current champions: Tajikistan U23 (1st title)
- Most championships: India (2 titles)
- 2026

The Tri-Nation Series is a 3-team association football tournament organised by the All India Football Federation (AIFF). It was launched as a replacement for the Nehru Cup with the first edition held in 2017, and won by India.

== Results ==
Year	Host	Winner	Runner-up	3rd place
2017; Details	Mumbai	India	Saint Kitts and Nevis	Mauritius
2023; Details	Imphal	India	Myanmar	Kyrgyzstan
2026; Details	Yupia	Tajikistan U23	India U23	Bhutan U23

== Medal summary ==
Rank	Nation	Gold	Silver	Bronze	Total
1	India	2	1	0	3
2	Tajikistan	1	0	0	1
3	Myanmar	0	1	0	1
3	Saint Kitts and Nevis	0	1	0	1
5	Bhutan	0	0	1	1
5	Kyrgyzstan	0	0	1	1
5	Mauritius	0	0	1	1
Totals (7 entries)		3	3	3	9

== See also ==
- Nehru Cup
- AIFF Intercontinental Cup
