= 2026 Tri-Nation Series (India) =

2026 U-23 Tri-Nation Championship
Tournament details
- Host country: India
- Dates: 25–31 March
- Teams: 3 (from 1 confederation)
- Venue: 1 (in 1 host city)

Final positions
- Champions: Tajikistan (1st title)
- Runners-up: India

Tournament statistics
- Matches played: 3
- Goals scored: 7 (2.33 per match)

The 2026 Tri-Nation Championship (also 2026 U-23 Tri-Nation Championship) is the third edition of the Tri-Nation Series, a 3-team football tournament held at the Golden Jubilee Stadium in the Indian city of Yupia between the 25 and 31 March. The tournament will be organised by the All India Football Federation (AIFF) and Arunachal Pradesh Football Association (APFA) as part of the U-23 men team's preparation for the Asian Games.

== Participating nations ==
Country	Appearance
India U23	3rd (host)
Tajikistan U23	1st
Bhutan U23	1st

- Note- FIFA do not produce any ranking for national under-23 teams.

== Venue ==
- All matches are held at the Golden Jubilee Stadium, Yupia, India.

Yupia	2026 Tri-Nation Series (India) is located in India
Golden Jubilee Stadium	2026 Tri-Nation Series (India) is located in India
27.1692°N 93.7431°E	2026 Tri-Nation Series (India) is located in India
Capacity: 15,000	2026 Tri-Nation Series (India) is located in India

== Standings ==
Pos	Team	Pld	W	D	L	GF	GA	GD	Pts	
1	Tajikistan	2	2	0	0	2	0	+2	6	Champions
2	India (H)	2	1	0	1	5	1	+4	3	
3	Bhutan	2	0	0	2	0	6	−6	0	

Source: GSA
(H) Hosts

== Matches ==
25 March 2026
19:00 UTC+5:30

Bhutan	0–1	Tajikistan
	Report	Gafurov 16'

Golden Jubilee Stadium, Yupia

28 March 2026
19:00 UTC+5:30

India	5–0	Bhutan
R. Haobam 44'; Bhat 51', 81'; T. Haobam 79'; Ajsal 85'	Report

Golden Jubilee Stadium, Yupia

31 March 2026
19:00 UTC+5:30

India	0–1	Tajikistan
	Report	Azizbek 9'

Golden Jubilee Stadium, Yupia
Referee: Crystal John (India)

== Winners ==
2023 Tri-Nation Series champion

Tajikistan
1st title

== Goalscorers ==
There were 7 goals scored in 3 matches, for an average of 2.33 goals per match.

2 goals

- (India) Suhail Ahmad Bhat

1 goal

- (India) Ricky Meetei Haobam
- (India) Tomba Singh Haobam
- (India) Muhammad Ajsal
- (Tajikistan) Masrur Gafurov
- (Tajikistan) Khaitov Azizbek
