= Football at the 2016 South Asian Games – Men's team squads =

Below are the squads for the Men's football tournament at 2016 South Asian Games, hosted by India, which will take place between 5 February 2016 and 16 February 2016.

== Group A ==
=== India ===
Coach: (England) Lee Johnson

No.	Pos.	Player	Date of birth (age)	Caps	Goals	Club
1	GK	Rehenesh TP				
16	GK	Kamaljit Singh				
15	GK	Laxmikant Kattimani				
2	DF	Narayan Das				
3	DF	Koushik Sarkar				
4	DF	Sandesh Jhingan				
5	DF	Bikramjit Singh				
12	DF	Salam Ranjan Singh				
13	DF	Samad Ali Mallick				
20	DF	Pritam Kotal				
7	MF	Vinit Rai				
8	MF	Germanpreet Singh				
9	MF	Lallianzuala Chhangte				
10	MF	Udanta Singh				
17	MF	Rowllin Borges				
18	MF	Jayesh Rane				
19	MF	Amoes Do				
6	FW	Jerry Mawimingthanga				
14	FW	Holicharan Narzary				

== Group B ==
=== Bhutan ===
Coach:

No.	Pos.	Player	Date of birth (age)	Caps	Goals	Club
1	GK	Tshering Dendup				
21	GK	Gyaltshen Zangpo				
23	GK	Tobgay				
2	DF	Kinley Penjor				
4	DF	Jigme Tshering Dorjee				
5	DF	Tenzing Dorji				
6	DF	Chimmi Dorji (Captain)				
8	DF	Nima Wangdi				
20	DF	Choki Wangchuk				
9	MF	Tenzin Shezang				
11	MF	Sonal Tobgay				
12	MF	Lungtok Dawa				
14	MF	Dawa Tshering				
16	MF	Tshering Dorji				
17	MF	Biren Basnet				
22	MF	Lhendup Dorji				
7	FW	Chencho Gyeltshen				
15	FW	Kesang Penjor				
18	FW	Dorji				
19	FW	Kezang Wangdi				

=== Nepal ===
Coach: (Nepal) Raju Kaji Shakya

No.	Pos.	Player	Date of birth (age)	Caps	Goals	Club
1	GK	Bikesh Kuthu				
19	GK	Alan Neupane				
20	GK	Amrit Chaudhary				
6	DF	Aditya Chaudhary				
4	DF	Ananta Tamang				
3	DF	Biraj Maharjan (Captain)				
15	DF	Dinesh Rajbansi				
5	DF	Man Bahadur Tamang				
2	DF	Kamal Shrestha (Not Eligible)				
12	MF	Bikram Lama				
8	MF	Bishal Rai				
11	MF	Heman Gurung				
10	MF	Jagajeet Shrestha				
16	MF	Prakash Budhathoki				
14	FW	Anjan Bista				
7	FW	Bimal Gharti Magar				
18	FW	Nawayug Shrestha				
9	FW	Ranjan Bista				
13	FW	Sunil Bal				
17	FW	Suman Lama				

== See also ==
- Football at the 2016 South Asian Games – Women's team squads
