= Football at the 2016 South Asian Games – Women's team squads =

Football at the 2016 South Asian Games – Women's tournament Below are the squads for the Women's football tournament at 2016 South Asian Games, hosted by India, which will take place between 5 February 2016 and 16 February 2016.

== India ==
Coach: (India) Sajid Dar

| No. | Pos. | Player | Date of birth (age) | Caps | Goals | Club |
|---|---|---|---|---|---|---|
| 15 | GK | Aditi Chauhan | 5 November 1991 (aged 24) | | | |
| | GK | Okram Roshini Devi | 8 February 1994 (aged 21) | | | |
| | GK | Elangbam Panthoi Chanu | 23 December 1996 (aged 19) | | | |
| 4 | DF | Loitongbam Ashalata Devi | 3 July 1993 (aged 22) | | | |
| | DF | Gurumayum Radharani Devi | 1 March 1991 (aged 24) | | | |
| | DF | Manisa Panna | 20 April 1991 (aged 24) | | | |
| | DF | Supriya Routray | 12 June 1990 (aged 25) | | | |
| | DF | Thokchom Umapati Devi | 10 March 1991 (aged 24) | | | |
| 18 | DF | Dalima Chhibber | 30 August 1991 (aged 24) | | | |
| 6 | MF | Oinam Bembem Devi | 1 March 1980 (aged 35) | | | |
| 7 | MF | Yumlembam Premi Devi | 6 December 1993 (aged 22) | | | |
| 17 | MF | Sangita Basfore | 18 May 1997 (aged 18) | | | |
| | MF | Kshetrimayum Margaret Devi | 9 May 1996 (aged 19) | | | |
| | MF | Sasmita Malik | 10 April 1989 (aged 26) | | | |
| 16 | MF | Irom Prameshwori Devi | 1 May 1989 (aged 26) | | | |
| 14 | MF | Sanju Yadav | 9 December 1997 (aged 18) | | | |
| 10 | FW | Ngangom Bala Devi | 2 February 1990 (aged 26) | | | |
| 12 | FW | Grace Dangmei | 5 February 1996 (aged 20) | | | |
| 9 | FW | Yumnam Kamala Devi | 4 March 1992 (aged 23) | | | |
| | FW | Pyari Xaxa | 18 May 1997 (aged 18) | | | |

== Bangladesh ==
Coach: Golam Robbani

Note: Flags indicate national team as defined under FIFA eligibility rules; some limited exceptions apply. Players may hold more than one non-FIFA nationality.

| No. | Pos. | Nation | Player |
|---|---|---|---|
| 1 | GK | BAN | Rowshan Ara |
| 2 | DF | BAN | Sheuli Azim |
| 3 | DF | BAN | Shamsunnahar |
| 4 | DF | BAN | Mossammat Nargis Khatun |
| 5 | DF | BAN | Masura Parvin |
| 6 | MF | BAN | Sanjida Akhter |
| 7 | FW | BAN | Maynu Marma (Vice-captain) |
| 8 | MF | BAN | Mishrat Jahan Moushumi |
| 9 | FW | BAN | Sirat Jahan |
| 10 | FW | BAN | Sabina Khatun (Captain) |

| No. | Pos. | Nation | Player |
|---|---|---|---|
| 11 | MF | BAN | Marzia Akter |
| 12 | FW | BAN | Krishna Rani Sarkar |
| 13 | DF | BAN | Nilufa Yesmin Nila |
| 14 | MF | BAN | Israt Jahan Ratna |
| 15 | MF | BAN | Maria Manda |
| 16 | GK | BAN | Mahmuda Akhter |
| 17 | GK | BAN | Sabina Akter |
| 18 | DF | BAN | Anai Mogini |
| 19 | FW | BAN | Munmun Akter |
| 20 | FW | BAN | Anuching Mogini |

== Maldives ==
Coach:

| No. | Pos. | Player | Date of birth (age) | Caps | Goals | Club |
|---|---|---|---|---|---|---|
| | | Fadhuwa Zahir | | | | |

== Nepal ==
Coach: (Nepal) Dhruba KC

| No. | Pos. | Player | Date of birth (age) | Caps | Goals | Club |
|---|---|---|---|---|---|---|
| 16 | GK | Anjali Thumba Subba | – | – | – | (All Nepal Football Association) |
| 20 | GK | Lila Lamgade | – | – | – | (All Nepal Football Association) |
| 1 | GK | Namita Kumari Dali | 16 June 1991 (age 34) | – | – | (All Nepal Football Association) Nepal Police Club |
| 4 | DF | Ghim Kumari Gurung | – | – | – | (All Nepal Football Association) |
| 3 | DF | Poonam Jarga Magar | – | – | – | (All Nepal Football Association) |
| 15 | DF | Mana Maya Limbu | – | – | – | (All Nepal Football Association) |
| 5 | DF | Amrita Jaisi | – | – | – | (All Nepal Football Association) |
| 2 | DF | Bhagawati Thapa | – | – | – | (All Nepal Football Association) |
| 12 | MF | Sajana Rana | 13 June 1987 (age 38) | 8 | 8 | (Football Association of Maldives) New Radiant S.C. |
| 17 | MF | Laxmi Puadel | – | – | – | (All Nepal Football Association) |
| 18 | MF | Deepa Rai | – | – | – | (All Nepal Football Association) |
| 7 | MF | Sapana Lama | – | – | – | (All Nepal Football Association) |
| 6 | MF | Hira Kumari Bhujel | – | – | – | (All Nepal Football Association) |
| 11 | MF | Anita Basnet | – | – | – | (All Nepal Football Association) |
| 10 | FW | Anu Lama | 3 October 1987 (age 38) | 19 | 30 | (All Nepal Football Association) APF Club |
| 8 | FW | Deepa Adhikari | – | – | – | (All Nepal Football Association) |
| 14 | FW | Niru Thapa | – | – | – | (All Nepal Football Association) |
| 9 | FW | Sabitra Bhandari | – | – | – | (All Nepal Football Association) |
| 13 | FW | Anjali Waiba | – | – | – | (All Nepal Football Association) |
| 19 | FW | Krishna Khatri | – | – | – | (All Nepal Football Association) |

== Sri Lanka ==
Coach:

| No. | Pos. | Player | Date of birth (age) | Caps | Goals | Club |
|---|---|---|---|---|---|---|
| | | Hasara Dilrangi | | | | |
| | | R Ekanayake | | | | |
| | | Hasara Dilrangi | | | | |
| | | A.S. Perera | | | | |

== See also ==
Football at the 2016 South Asian Games – Men's team squads
