= 2026 SAFF U-23 Championship =

Tournament details
- Host country: Bangladesh
- City: Dhaka
- Teams: 7 (from 1 sub-confederation)
- Venue: 1

The 2026 SAFF U-23 Championship is the inaugural edition of the SAFF U-23 Championship, an international football competition for men's under-23 national teams from South Asia region, organized by the South Asian Football Federation (SAFF). The tournament scheduled to be played in Dhaka, Bangladesh from May 2026. However, it has not yet taken place due to scheduling conflicts. The tournament might possibly be held before the 2027 AFC U-23 Asian Cup qualifiers.

== Host selection ==
At the SAFF Executive Committee virtual meeting, held on 8 January 2025 in the Dhaka, Bangladesh. The SAFF tournament committee announced the name of Bangladesh host country of the tournament.

== Participating teams ==
The following seven teams will participate in the competition.

Team	Appearances in the SAFF U-23 Championship	Previous best performance
Bangladesh (Host)	Debut	—N/a
Bhutan	Debut	—N/a
India	Debut	—N/a
Maldives	Debut	—N/a
Nepal	Debut	—N/a
Pakistan	Debut	—N/a
Sri Lanka	Debut	—N/a

== Players eligibility ==
Each team had to register a squad of minimum 16 and maximum 23 players. Players born on or after 1 January 2004 were eligible to compete in the tournament (as per FIFA eligibility rules of underage competitions).

== Venue ==
All matches will held at the National Stadium, Dhaka, Bangladesh.

Dhaka	2026 SAFF U-23 Championship is located in Bangladesh
National Stadium	2026 SAFF U-23 Championship is located in Bangladesh
23°43′40.2″N 90°24′48.4″E	2026 SAFF U-23 Championship is located in Bangladesh
Capacity: 22,400 seats	2026 SAFF U-23 Championship is located in Bangladesh

== Draw ==
The draw ceremony of the tournament yet to be held.

=== Draw result ===
Draw Ceremony has not been held yet.

== Match officials ==
Referees

Not yet selected. Will be selected soon.

Assistant referees

Not yet selected. Will be selected soon.

== Group stage ==
- All matches were played at Dhaka, Bangladesh.
- Times listed are UTC+6

The groups have not been determined yet. They will be determined soon.

== Knockout stage ==
Not yet determined. Will be determined soon.

== Awards ==
Not yet determined. Will be determined soon.

== Statistics ==
Not yet determined. Will be determined soon.

=== Goalscorers ===
Not yet determined. Will be determined soon.

=== Hat-tricks ===
Not yet determined. Will be determined soon.

== Broadcasting rights ==
Country	Broadcaster	Ref.
India	FanCode	fancode.com

== See also ==
- 2026 SAFF U-17 Championship
- 2026 SAFF U-20 Championship
- 2026 SAFF Championship
- 2026 SAFF Futsal Championship
- 2026 SAFF Club Championship
- 2026 SAFF Women's Championship
