= SAFF U-23 Championship =

- Founded: 2026
- Region: South Asia (SAFF)
- Teams: 7
- Website: saffederation.org
- 2026 SAFF U-23 Championship

The SAFF U-23 Championship is a biennial football championship for male footballers under the age of 23 and is organized by the South Asian Football Federation (SAFF). The championship will be held for the first time in August 2026 in Bangladesh. The tournaments are held just before AFC U-23 Asian Cup qualification matches, keeping in mind about proper preparation for that.

== History ==
On 9 January 2025, the SAFF virtual meeting was held in Dhaka. At that meeting, the SAFF tournament committee decided that, the SAFF Under-23 Championship will be held around May 2026. It is hoped that through this competition, teams from the region will be able to prepare for the Youth Olympics and the U-23 Asian Cup.

== Results ==
Ed.	Year	Hosts	Final			Third place playoff			No. of teams
Ed.	Year	Hosts	Champions	Score	Runners-up	Third place	Score	Fourth place	No. of teams
1	2026	Bangladesh							7

== Participating nations ==
Legend

- 1st – Champions
- 2nd – Runners-up
- 3rd – Third place
- 4th – Fourth place
- GS – Group stage
- q – Qualified for upcoming tournament
- — Hosts
- × – Did not enter
- • – Did not qualify
- × – Withdrew before qualification
- — Withdrew after qualification
- — Disqualified after qualification

Team	(Bangladesh) 2026	Total
Bangladesh	TBD	0
Bhutan	TBD	0
India	TBD	0
Maldives	TBD	0
Nepal	TBD	0
Pakistan	TBD	0
Sri Lanka	TBD	0

== Awards ==
Tournament	Most Valuable Player	Top scorer(s)	Goals	Best Goalkeeper	Fair play award
2026	TBD	TBD	TBD	TBD	TBD

== Winning coaches ==
Year	Team	Coach
2026	TBD	TBD

== See also ==
- SAFF Championship
- SAFF U-20 Championship
- SAFF U-17 Championship
- South Asian Games
- SAFF Women's Championship
- SAFF U-20 Women's Championship
- SAFF U-17 Women's Championship
