= Pema Tshewang =

Bhutanese football referee

- Full name: Pema Tshewang
- Born: Punakha, Bhutan
- Other occupation: Physical education teacher Sports coach

Domestic
Years	League	Role
2011–present (since 2012 at the Bhutan Premier League)	Bhutan Premier League	Referee

International
Years	League	Role
2014–present	FIFA listed	Referee

Pema Tshewang is a Bhutanese football referee, who has been FIFA-listed since 2014.

== Career ==
Tshewang graduated from Higher Secondary School in his native Punakha in 2008 and began an amateur referee career as a part-time job in 2011, while studying physical education in Paro. In 2017, he graduated with a diploma in P.E. and sports coaching from the Paro College of Education. He later began coaching the sports teams of the Sports Federation from different faculties of the Royal University of Bhutan, and has helped in the organization of the university's winter and summer games for students.

In 2014, FIFA named Tshewang as the Bhutanese representative for international competitions. In 2019, he was selected as Bhutan's referee for the men's tournament of the South Asian Games in Kathmandu, Nepal, where he oversaw a single game between Nepal and Sri Lanka (1–1) in Dasharath Rangasala Stadium. He has also officiated friendly matches for the FIFA Series qualification, including a game between Seychelles and Bangladesh at the Sylhet District Stadium in March 2023, which ended in the crowning of the Seychelles by a 1–0 result, following a penalty kick given by Tshewang to the Seychelles after a foul by Md Saad Uddin on Daryl Bertrand, which was then scored by player Michael Mancienne.

Tshewang has also been active in the SAFF Championship, which is a primary competition for men's national teams from the South Asian Football Federation. He was appointed for the 2023 edition held in India, where he refereed two group stage matches: Pakistan vs. Kuwait (0–4), and the 1–0 victory of Lebanon over the Maldives. Also in 2023, Tshewang took part in Nepal's organization of the SAFF U-19 Championship, where he led a game between the locals and the Maldives (4–1) in Kathmandu. During the heated match, Nepalese player Sujan Dangol provoked Maldivian player Mohamed Iyaan Hassan, and ended up fighting each other and being sent off by Tshewang, who showed them both a red card. After the game finished, Maldivian player Afzal Mohamed (who had already been issued a yellow card), was shown a second yellow and a subsequent red card by Tshewang, after he angrily protested Tshewang's refereeing decisions.

More prominent roles for Tshewang came within the SAFF tournaments, reaching the refereeing of the final match of the 2025 SAFF U-17 Championship in Sri Lanka on 27 September 2025, where India U-17 defeated Bangladesh U-17 on penalties following a 2–2 draw at the Colombo Racecourse Stadium. In the previous edition, Tshewang refereed a semifinal game between Pakistan U-17 and Bangladesh U-17, which was won by the Bengalis on penalties.

== Selected performances ==
Date	Match	Result	Round	Tournament
4 December 2019	Nepal – Sri Lanka	1–1	Group stage	South Asian Games
24 June 2023	Pakistan – Kuwait	0–4	Group stage	2023 SAFF Championship
28 June 2023	Lebanon – Maldives	1–0	Group stage	2023 SAFF Championship
25 September 2023	Nepal – Maldives	4–1	Group stage	2023 SAFF U-19 Championship
28 September 2024	Pakistan – Bangladesh	2–2 (7–8)	Semifinals	2024 SAFF U-17 Championship
27 September 2025	Bangladesh – India	2–2 (1–4)	Final	2025 SAFF U-17 Championship
