= Paro College of Education =

Coordinates: 27.4170°N 89.4228°E

Location
- Paro; Paro, 00975; Bhutan

Information
- Type: Education
- Established: 4 November 1974
- Local authority: Royal University of Bhutan
- Enrolment: Pre service: 1093; In service: 581 and Total students: 1764
- Website: www.pce.edu.bt

Paro College of Education is one of the constituent colleges of the Royal University of Bhutan.

== History ==
It began as a Teacher Training Centre for preschool care, which was formally inaugurated on 4 November 1974 with five female trainees and the center was a demonstration school at the Rinpung campus.

The Objectives of the Pre Primary Teacher (Kuensel, 5 December 1977) reports that it would cater to the suit the need of the time. It had 300 students.

Dasho Nado Rinchen was the Officer on Special Duty (OSD) to train the Bhutanese as a good teacher. Aum Dasho Gagay Lhamu was the first principal of the demonstration school. The TTC had the curriculum on the Pedagogy, Community development, Health & hygiene and School organization. The center (TTC) had the first batch of 15 ladies as “teacher graduates” on 24 November 1977.

The new Teacher training Center academic Campus at Nangkha was inaugurated by Her Majesty the Queen Ashi Dorji Wangmo Wangchuck on 18 November 1999.

== Notable alumni ==
- Pema Tshewang – FIFA-listed football referee; he studied and graduated in P.E. and sports coaching from the college in 2017, taking later an educative role.
