= 2025 SAFF U-17 Championship =

Tournament details
- Host country: Sri Lanka
- Dates: 15–27 September 2025
- Teams: 7 (from 1 sub-confederation)
- Venue: 1 (in 1 host city)

Final positions
- Champions: India (7th title)
- Runners-up: Bangladesh

Tournament statistics
- Matches played: 12
- Goals scored: 43 (3.58 per match)
- Top scorer(s): (Pakistan) Muhammad Abdullah (6 goals)
- Best player: (Bangladesh) Nazmul Huda Faysal
- Best goalkeeper: (Bangladesh) Md Alif Rahman
- Fair play award: India

The 2025 SAFF U-17 Championship was the 10th edition of the SAFF U-17 Championship, an international football competition for men's under-17 national teams organized by South Asian Football Federation (SAFF). The tournament was played from 15 to 27 September 2025 in Colombo, Sri Lanka.

India are the defending champions, who won their seventh title by defeating Bangladesh (4)2–2(1) goals penalty shootout in the final on 27 September 2025.

== Venue ==
All matches were played at the Colombo Racecourse Stadium in Colombo, Sri Lanka.

Colombo	Colombo is located in Sri Lanka
Colombo Racecourse Stadium	Colombo is located in Sri Lanka
Capacity: 10,000	Colombo is located in Sri Lanka

== Participating teams ==
The following seven teams are participated in the tournament.

Team	Appearances	Previous best performance
Bangladesh	10th	Champion (2015, 2018)
Bhutan	8th	Fourth place (2017)
India	10th	Champion (2013, 2017, 2019, 2022, 2023, 2024)
Maldives	8th	Group stage (2011, 2015, 2017, 2018, 2022)
Nepal	10th	Runners-up (2013, 2017, 2019, 2022)
Pakistan	6th	Champion (2011)
Sri Lanka (Host)	8th	Semi-finals (2022)

== Draw ==
The draw ceremony of the tournament was held in Hotel InterContinental, Dhaka, Bangladesh on 20 July 2025. The seven participants was divided into two groups which Group A consist three teams & followed by Group B four teams.

=== Draw pot ===
Pot 1	Pot 2	Pot 3	Pot 4
India; Sri Lanka (Host)	Bangladesh; Pakistan	Nepal; Bhutan	Maldives

=== Draw result ===
Group A
Pos	Team
A1	Sri Lanka
A2	Bangladesh
A3	Nepal

Group B
Pos	Team
B1	India
B2	Pakistan
B3	Bhutan
B4	Maldives

== Squads ==
All the teams announced their squads before the tournament began.

== Match officials ==
The following officials were chosen for the competition by SAFF tournament committee.

Referees

- (Bangladesh) Md Alamgir Sarker (†)
- (Bhutan) Pema Tshewang (†)
- (India) Ashwin Kumar (†)
- (Maldives) Afsheen Naseer (†)
- (Nepal) Shyam Lal Danuwar (†)
- (Sri Lanka) Kasun L. Weerkakkody (†)

Assistant Referees

- (Bangladesh) SM Junayed Sharif
- (Bhutan) Hem Kumar Sunwar
- (India) P Muralitharan
- (Nepal) Harish Karki
- (Pakistan) Dilawar Khan
- (Sri Lanka) Lahiru M Jayaneththi

Match Commissioner

- (India) Sudhir M Chembazhi
- (Sri Lanka) De Silva Jayasooriya

Referee Assessor

- (Maldives) Mohamed Ameez

(†): working as both referee and assistant

== Players eligibility ==
Players born on or after 1 January 2009 are eligible to compete in the tournament. Each team has to register a squad of minimum 16 players and maximum 23 players, minimum two of whom must be goalkeepers.

== Group stage ==
- Times listed are UTC+5:30 Sri Lanka Standard Time (SLST).

Key to colours in group tables
Group winners and runners-up advance to the semi-finals

Tiebreakers

Teams are ranked according to points (3 points for a win, 1 point for a draw, 0 points for a loss), and if tied on points, the following tiebreaking criteria are applied, in the order given, to determine the rankings.

1. Points in head-to-head matches among tied teams;
2. Goal difference in head-to-head matches among tied teams;
3. Goals scored in head-to-head matches among tied teams;
4. If more than two teams are tied, and after applying all head-to-head criteria above, a subset of teams are still tied, all head-to-head criteria above are reapplied exclusively to this subset of teams;
5. Goal difference in all group matches;
6. Goals scored in all group matches;
7. Penalty shoot-out if only two teams are tied and they met in the last round of the group;
8. Disciplinary points (yellow card = 1 point, red card as a result of two yellows, direct red card = 3 points, yellow card followed by direct red card = 4 points);
9. Drawing of lots.

=== Group A ===
Pos	Team	Pld	W	D	L	GF	GA	GD	Pts	Qualification
1	Bangladesh	2	2	0	0	8	0	+8	6	Qualified for Knockout stage
2	Nepal	2	1	0	1	2	4	−2	3	Qualified for Knockout stage
3	Sri Lanka (H)	2	0	0	2	0	6	−6	0	

Source: SAFF
(H) Hosts
15 September 2025
19:00

Nepal	2–0	Sri Lanka
S. Kumar 54', 90+3'	Report

Colombo Racecourse Stadium, Colombo
Attendance: 1,220
Referee: Ashwin Kumar (India)

18 September 2025
19:00

Bangladesh	4–0	Nepal
S. Islam 30'; O. Rahman 49'; M. Arif 50'; M. Manik 65'	Report

Colombo Racecourse Stadium, Colombo
Attendance: 179
Referee: Afsheen Naseer (Maldives)

21 September 2025
19:00

Bangladesh	4–0	Sri Lanka
M. Arif 18'; Rifat 48', 63', 89'	Report

Colombo Racecourse Stadium, Colombo
Attendance: 1,742
Referee: Pema Tshewang (Bhutan)

=== Group B ===
Pos	Team	Pld	W	D	L	GF	GA	GD	Pts	Qualification
1	India	3	3	0	0	10	2	+8	9	Qualified for Knockout stage
2	Pakistan	3	2	0	1	11	5	+6	6	Qualified for Knockout stage
3	Bhutan	3	1	0	2	1	5	−4	3	
4	Maldives	3	0	0	3	2	12	−10	0	

Source: SAFF
16 September 2025
15:00

India	6–0	Maldives
Gangte 12', 68' (pen.); Manavathi 29'; Doungel 49'; Wangkheirakpam 59'; Najar 86'	Report

Colombo Racecourse Stadium, Colombo
Attendance: 141
Referee: Kasun L. Weerkakkody (Sri Lanka)
16 September 2025
19:30

Bhutan	0–4	Pakistan
	Report	M. Abdullah 15', 25', 70'; H. Yasir 67'

Colombo Racecourse Stadium, Colombo
Attendance: 143
Referee: Shyam Lal Danuwar (Nepal)

19 September 2025
15:00

Pakistan	5–2	Maldives
M. Ahmed 12', 32', 45' (pen.); M. Abdullah 45+7', 61' (pen.)	Report	Ali Ilaan 42'; Shifau 71'

Colombo Racecourse Stadium, Colombo
Attendance: 153
Referee: Md Alamgir Sarker (Bangladesh)
19 September 2025
19:30

Bhutan	0–1	India
	Report	R. Ahmed 58'

Colombo Racecourse Stadium, Colombo
Attendance: 171
Referee: Kasun L. Weerkakkody (Sri Lanka)

22 September 2025
15:00

India	3–2	Pakistan
Gangte 31'; Wangkheirakpam 63'; R. Ahmed 74'	Report	M. Abdullah 43' (pen.); H. Yasir 70'

Colombo Racecourse Stadium, Colombo
Attendance: 157
Referee: Kasun L. Weerkakkody (Sri Lanka)
22 September 2025
19:00

Bhutan	1–0	Maldives
Thinley 10' (pen.)	Report

Colombo Racecourse Stadium, Colombo
Attendance: 117
Referee: Ashwin Kumar (India)

== Knockout stage ==
- In the knockout stages, if a match finished goalless at the end of normal playing time, extra time would have been played (two periods of 15 minutes each) and followed, if necessary, by a penalty shoot-out to determine the winner.

=== Bracket ===
Semi-finals
25 September – Colombo
Bangladesh	2
Pakistan	0
25 September – Colombo
India	3
Nepal	0

Final
27 September – Colombo
Bangladesh	2 (1)
India (p)	2 (4)

=== Semi-finals ===
25 September 2025
15:00

Bangladesh	2–0	Pakistan
N. Faysal 2'; O. Rahman 4'	Report

Colombo Racecourse Stadium, Colombo
Attendance: 157
Referee: Pema Tshewang (Bhutan)
25 September 2025
19:30

India	3–0	Nepal
G. Wangkheirakpam 61'; A. Shah 80'; D. Thokchom 90+4'	Report

Colombo Racecourse Stadium, Colombo
Attendance: 143
Referee: Afsheen Naseer (Maldives)

=== Final ===
27 September 2025
20:00

Bangladesh	2–2	India
M. Manik 24'; Riduan 90+7'	Report	Gangte 4'; A. Shah 38'
Penalties
Ikramul (penalty missed); Azam (penalty missed); M. Manik (penalty scored)	1–4	(penalty scored) Gangte; (penalty scored) K. Meitei; (penalty scored) I. Magar; (penalty scored) Poonia

Colombo Racecourse Stadium, Colombo
Attendance: 374
Referee: Pema Tshewang (Bhutan)

== Winner ==
CHAMPIONS

India
Seventh title

== Statistics ==
=== Goalscorers ===
There were 43 goals scored in 12 matches, for an average of 3.58 goals per match.

6 goals

- (Pakistan) Muhammad Abdullah

4 goals

- (India) Dallalmuon Gangte

3 goals

- (Bangladesh) Md Rifat Kazi
- (India) Gunleiba Wangkheirakpam
- (Pakistan) Mansoor Ahmed

2 goals

- (Bangladesh) Mohammad Arif
- (Bangladesh) Mohammad Manik
- (Bangladesh) Opu Rahman
- (India) Rahan Ahmed
- (India) Azlaan Shah Kh
- (Nepal) Samir Kumar
- (Pakistan) Hamza Yasir

1 goal

- (Bangladesh) Sabbir Islam
- (Bangladesh) Ihsan Habib Riduan
- (Bangladesh) Nazmul Huda Faysal
- (Bhutan) Thinley Dhendup Dorji
- (India) Kamgouhao Doungel
- (India) Hrishikesh Manavathi
- (India) Aazim Parveez Najar
- (India) Diamond Singh Thokchom
- (Maldives) Ali Ilaan
- (Maldives) Mohamed Shayan Shifau

Source: Sofascore

=== Hat trick ===
Player	Against	Result	Date	Ref
(Pakistan) Muhammad Abdullah	Bhutan	4–0	16 September 2025	
(Pakistan) Mansoor Ahmad	Maldives	5–2	19 September 2025	
(Bangladesh) Md Rifat Kazi	Sri Lanka	4–0	21 September 2025	

== Awards ==
Fair Play Award	Best Goalkeeper	Highest Goalscorer	Most Valuable Player
India	(Bangladesh) Md Alif Rahman	(Pakistan) Muhammad Abdullah	(Bangladesh) Nazmul Huda Faysal

== Broadcasting ==
Territory	Broadcaster(s)	Reference
No restricted territory	Sportzworkz^{(YouTube channel)}	2025 SAFF U17 matches playlist on YouTube

== See also ==
- 2025–26 AFC Women's Champions League
- 2025 SAFF U-17 Women's Championship
- 2025 SAFF U-20 Women's Championship
