= Football at the 2019 South Asian Games – Men's tournament =

2019 South Asian Games
Tournament details
- Host country: Nepal
- Dates: 1–10 December 2019
- Teams: 5 (from 1 confederation)
- Venue: 1 (in 1 host city)

Final positions
- Champions: Nepal (4th title)
- Runners-up: Bhutan
- Third place: Bangladesh

Tournament statistics
- Matches played: 11
- Goals scored: 23 (2.09 per match)
- Attendance: 87,750 (7,977 per match)
- Top scorer(s): (Nepal) Sujal Shrestha (Nepal) Abhishek Rijal (3 goals each)

Men's football at the 2019 South Asian Games was held in Kathmandu, Nepal from 2 December to 10 December 2019. It was the 13th edition of the tournament.

== Venue ==
Kathmandu
Dasarath Rangasala Stadium
Capacity: 16,000
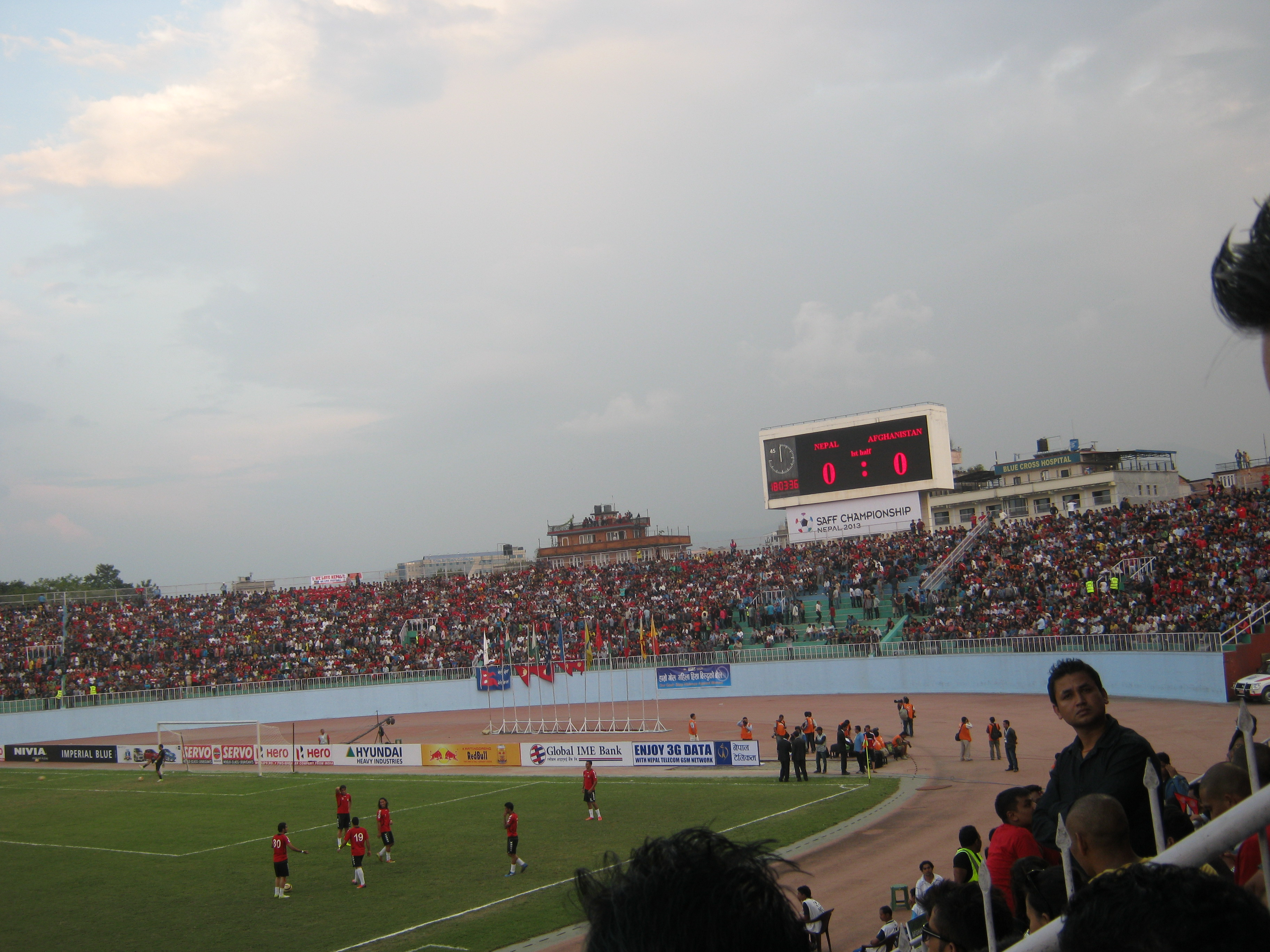

== Participating nations ==
Country	Appearance	Previous best performance	FIFA ranking 28 November 2019
Bangladesh	5th	Gold Medal (1999, 2010)	187
Bhutan	5th	Fourth-Place (2004)	189
Maldives	4th	Silver Medal (1991)	155
Nepal (Host)	5th	Gold Medal (1984, 1993, 2016)	170
Sri Lanka	5th	Silver Medal (2006)	205

== Squads ==
Each nation must submit a squad of 20 players, 17 of whom must be born on or after 1 January 1997, and three of whom can be older dispensation players.

== Officials ==
Referees

- MD Mizanur Rahman (Bangladesh)
- Mohamed Javiz (Maldives)
- Rahul Kumar Gupta (India)
- Pema Tshewang (Bhutan)
- (Sri Lanka) Kasun Weerakkody Karage (Sri Lanka)
- Kabin Byanjankar (Nepal)
- Nabindra Maharjan (Nepal)
- Shrawan Lama (Nepal)

Assistant Referees

- Sk Ikball Alam (Bangladesh)
- Niushaad Mohamed (Maldives)
- Vairamuthu Parasuraman (India)
- Yonten Chophel (Bhutan)
- (Sri Lanka) Dayan Sendanayaka (Sri Lanka)
- Rojen Shrestha (Nepal)
- Padam Bhujel (Nepal)
- Sahadev Shrestha (Nepal)
- Madhav Khatri (Nepal)
- Naniram Thapamagar (Nepal)

== Fixtures and results ==
All times are local, NST (UTC+05:45).

=== Round Robin stage ===
Pos	Team	Pld	W	D	L	GF	GA	GD	Pts	Qualification
1	Nepal (H)	4	3	1	0	8	2	+6	10	Advance to Final
2	Bhutan	4	3	0	1	6	5	+1	9	Advance to Final
3	Bangladesh	4	1	1	2	2	3	−1	4	
4	Maldives	4	0	2	2	3	5	−2	2	
5	Sri Lanka	4	0	2	2	1	5	−4	2	

Source: 2019 SAG Unogoal
Rules for classification: 1) points; 2) goal difference; 3) goals scored; 4) head-to-head result.
(H) Hosts

Matches

2 December 2019
13:00

Bangladesh	0−1	Bhutan
	Report	Gyeltshen 64'

Dasarath Rangasala Stadium, Kathmandu
Attendance: 500
Referee: Nabindra Maharjan (Nepal)
2 December 2019
17:00

Sri Lanka	0−0	Maldives
	Report

Dasarath Rangasala Stadium, Kathmandu
Attendance: 500
Referee: Shrawan Lama (Nepal)

3 December 2019
13:30

Bhutan	0−4	Nepal
	Report	S. Shrestha 5', 55'; Rijal 66'; M. Tamang 77'

Dasarath Rangasala Stadium, Kathmandu
Attendance: 15,000
Referee: Kasun Weerakkody Karage (Sri Lanka)
3 December 2019
17:30

Maldives	1−1	Bangladesh
Hossain 70'	Report	A. Ghanee 30' (o.g.)

Dasarath Rangasala Stadium, Kathmandu
Attendance: 450
Referee: Kabin Byanjankar (Nepal)

4 December 2019
17:30

Nepal	1−1	Sri Lanka
S. Shrestha 36'	Report	Aakib 90+1'

Dasarath Rangasala Stadium, Kathmandu
Attendance: 18,000
Referee: Pema Tshewang (Bhutan)

5 December 2019
13:30

Bhutan	2−1	Maldives
C. Dorji 55'; Thinley 84'	Report	H. Mohamad 90'

Dasarath Rangasala Stadium, Kathmandu
Attendance: 200
Referee: MD Mizanur Rahman (Bangladesh)
5 December 2019
17:30

Bangladesh	1−0	Sri Lanka
Sufil 11'	Report

Dasarath Rangasala Stadium, Kathmandu
Attendance: 100
Referee: Mohamed Javiz (Maldives)

7 December 2019
13:30

Nepal	2−1	Maldives
Rijal 43'; A. Tamang 52'	Report	Mahudhee 18'

Dasarath Rangasala Stadium, Kathmandu
Attendance: 20,000
Referee: MD Mizanur Rahman (Bangladesh)
7 December 2019
17:30

Sri Lanka	0−3	Bhutan
	Report	C. Dorji 18'; T. Dorji 69' (pen.); Y. Dorji 80'

Dasarath Rangasala Stadium, Kathmandu
Attendance: 400
Referee: Shrawan Lama (Nepal)

8 December 2019
17:30

Nepal	1–0	Bangladesh
S. Bal 11'	Report

Dasarath Rangasala Stadium, Kathmandu
Attendance: 15,000
Referee: Rahul Kumar Gupta (India)

=== Gold medal match ===
10 December 2019
15:00

Nepal	2–1	Bhutan
Rijal 17'; Bal 53'	Report	Gyeltshen 37'

Dasarath Rangasala Stadium, Kathmandu
Attendance: 17,600
Referee: Rahul Kumar Gupta (India)

== Winner ==
Football at the 2019 South Asian Games

Nepal
Fourth title

== Goalscorers ==
There were 23 goals scored in 11 matches, for an average of 2.09 goals per match.

3 goals

- (Nepal) Sujal Shrestha
- (Nepal) Abhishek Rijal

2 goals

- (Bhutan) Chimi Dorji
- (Nepal) Sunil Bal
- (Bhutan) Chencho Gyeltshen

1 goal

- (Bangladesh) Mahbubur Rahman Sufil
- (Bhutan) Tshering Dorji
- (Bhutan) Yeshi Dorji
- (Bhutan) Phub Thinley
- (Maldives) Ibrahim Mahudhee
- (Maldives) Hamza Mohamad
- (Maldives) Ibrahim Hussain
- (Nepal) Ananta Tamang
- (Nepal) Mikchhen Tamang
- (Sri Lanka) Mohamed Aakib

1 own goal

- (Maldives) Akram Ghanee (against Bangladesh)

== Final results ==
Pos	Team	Pld	W	D	L	GF	GA	GD	Pts	Final Result
1	Nepal (H)	5	4	1	0	10	3	+7	13	Gold Medal
2	Bhutan	5	3	0	2	7	7	0	9	Silver Medal
3	Bangladesh	4	1	1	2	2	3	−1	4	Bronze Medal
4	Maldives	4	0	2	2	3	5	−2	2	
5	Sri Lanka	4	0	2	2	1	5	−4	2	

Source: 2019 SAG Unogoal
Rules for classification: 1) points; 2) goal difference; 3) goals scored; 4) head-to-head result.
(H) Hosts
