= Rakhmatsho Rakhmatzoda =

Tajikistani footballer (born 2004)

Personal information
- Full name: Rakhmatsho Rakhmatzoda
- Date of birth: 6 April 2004 (age 22)
- Place of birth: Norak, Tajikistan
- Height: 1.82 m (6 ft 0 in)
- Positions: Centre-back; defensive midfielder

Team information
- Current team: Persijap Jepara
- Number: 3

Youth career
- 2020–2021: Lokomotiv-Pamir Dushanbe

Senior career*
Years	Team	Apps	(Gls)
2021–2023	Dynamo Dushanbe		
2023	Khosilot Farkhor	14	(0)
2023–2024	Ravshan Kulob	13	(0)
2024–2025	Persijap Jepara	20	(1)
2025	Barkchi Hisor	9	(0)
2025–2026	PSIM Yogyakarta	24	(1)
2026–	Persijap Jepara	4	(0)

International career^{‡}
2021	Tajikistan U17	1	(0)
2022	Tajikistan U19	1	(0)
2022	Tajikistan U20	8	(0)
2023–	Tajikistan U23	10	(1)
2024–	Tajikistan	4	(0)
- * Club domestic league appearances and goals as of 16 October 2026 ‡ National team caps and goals as of 5 June 2026

Rakhmatsho Rakhmatzoda (Tajik: Рахматзода Рахматшо; born 6 April 2004) is a Tajikistani professional footballer who plays as a centre-back or defensive midfielder for Super League club Persijap Jepara and the Tajikistan national team.

== Club career ==
=== Lokomotiv-Pamir Dushanbe ===
He started his junior career with the Lokomotiv-Pamir Dushanbe U19 team in his country.

=== Dynamo Dushanbe ===
Rakhmatzoda started his professional career with Dynamo Dushanbe in 2021, he played for Dushanbe for 2 years before moving to Khosilot Farkhor.

=== Khosilot Farkhor & Ravshan Kulob ===
After only lasting half a season with Khosilot Farkhor, Rakhmatzoda then played for Ravshan Kulob for half a season, earning 34 caps for both teams in domestic and AFC competitions. He then moved to Persijap Jepara for the 2024–25 season.

=== Persijap Jepara ===
With his calm and consistently good play, his career continued to soar at Persijap Jepara. In fact, in the middle of the season with Persijap Jepara, Rakhmatzoda was in the media spotlight and was called up to the Tajikistan U23 national team for matches against Malaysia and the United Arab Emirates.

=== Barkchi Hisor ===
Rakhmatzoda has returned to Tajikistan and joined Barkchi Hisor, a club that plays in the Tajikistan Higher League and is currently at the bottom of the standings.

== Career statistics ==
=== International ===
As of 5 June 2026

Appearances and goals by national team and year
Tajikistan national team
Year	Apps	Goals
2024	3	0
2025	0	0
2026	1	0
Total	4	0
