= South Asian Football Federation =

Football association

SAFF
- South Asian Football Federation

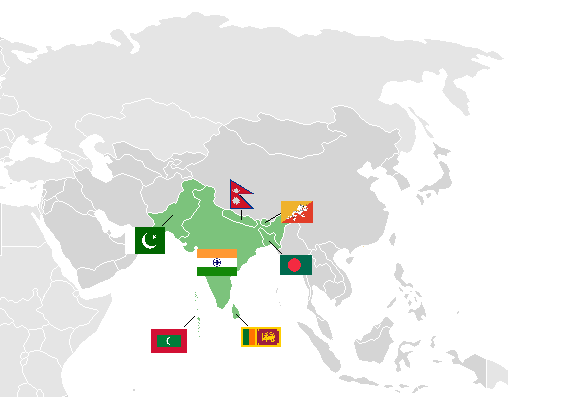
- Abbreviation: SAFF
- Formation: 1997; 29 years ago
- Type: Football organisation
- Headquarters: Dhaka, Bangladesh
- Region served: South Asia
- Members: 7 member associations
- President: (Bangladesh) Kazi Salahuddin
- Vice Presidents: (Sri Lanka) Jaswar Umaru Lebbe (India) N. A. Haris
- General Secretary: (Nepal) Purushottam Kattel
- Parent organisation: AFC
- Website: saffederation.org

The South Asian Football Federation (SAFF) is an association of the football playing nations in South Asia. Incorporated in 1997, it is a regional subsidiary of the Asian Football Confederation. The members of the association are Bangladesh, Bhutan, India, Maldives, Nepal, Pakistan and Sri Lanka.

== History ==
The SAFF was founded in 1997, with Bangladesh, India, Maldives, Nepal, Pakistan, and Sri Lanka. In 2000, they expanded to 7 members, adding Bhutan. Afghanistan joined in 2005, but left in 2015, to join then newly formed Central Asian Football Association.

== Presidents ==
| President | Years | Ref. |
|---|---|---|
| (India) P. P. Lakshmanan | 1997–2001 | |
| (Nepal) Ganesh Thapa | 2001–2009 | |
| (Bangladesh) Kazi Salahuddin | 2009–2016 | |
| (Sri Lanka) Ranjith Rodrigo (acting) | 2016 | |
| (Bangladesh) Kazi Salahuddin | 2016–present | |

== Member associations ==
| Code | Association | Joined in | National team | National league |
|---|---|---|---|---|
| BAN | Bangladesh | 1997 | Men's; U23; U20; U17; F; BS; Women's; U20; U17 | (Men, Women) |
| BHU | Bhutan | 2000 | Men's; U23; U20; U17; F; BS; Women's; U20; U17 | (Men, Women) |
| IND | India | 1997 | Men's; U23; U20; U17; F; BS; Women's; U20; U17 | (Men, Women) |
| MDV | Maldives | 1997 | Men's; U23; U20; U17; F; BS; Women's; U20; U17 | (Men, Women) |
| NEP | Nepal | 1997 | Men's; U23; U20; U17; F; BS; Women's; U20; U17 | (Men, Women) |
| PAK | Pakistan | 1997 | Men's; U23; U20; U17; F; BS; Women's; U20; U17 | (Men, Women) |
| SRI | Sri Lanka | 1997 | Men's; U23; U20; U17; F; BS; Women's; U20; U17 | (Men) |

=== Former member ===
| Association | Year | Note |
|---|---|---|
| Afghanistan | 2005–2015 | Joined CAFA in 2015. |

== Competitions ==
The South Asian Football Federation runs several competitions on subcontinental level.

=== National teams ===
Men

- SAFF Championship
- SAFF U-23 Championship
- SAFF U-20 Championship
- SAFF U-17 Championship
- SAFF Futsal Championship
- South Asian Games

Women

- SAFF Women's Championship
- SAFF U-20 Women's Championship
- SAFF U-17 Women's Championship
- SAFF Women's Futsal Championship
- South Asian Games

=== Clubs ===
Men

- SAFF Club Championship

Women

- SAFF Women's Club Championship

The South Asian Football Federation announced in April 2011 that they had decided to start a new tournament for association football club sides, the SAFF Club Championship, with the inaugural edition to be held in Bangladesh from 1–15 September of the same year. The competition was postponed and desires to revive the competition were again announced in July 2013 but the competition has still not started with accusations that India, the prime nation in the competition, were not altogether interested in participating.

Sri Lanka was supposed to host the first edition in August 2014.

A new possible start was set for December 2016 but later announced that 2017 would see the first edition. This again was changed and announced that 2018 would be the start of the tournament.

In January 2025, SAFF announced three new competitions: SAFF Club Championship, SAFF Women's Club Championship and the SAFF U-23 Championship. SAFF struck a deal with marketing partner Sportfive to fund the Men's, Women's, Under-23 and Club Championship.

=== Current title holders ===
| Competition | Year | Champions | Details | Runners-up | Next |
Men's national teams
| Championship | 2026 | India | 2–1 | Pakistan | TBA |
| U-23 Championship | — | — | — | — | 2026 |
| U-20 Championship | 2026 | Bangladesh | 0–0 (4–3 p) | India | 2027 |
| U-17 Championship | 2025 | India | 2–2 (4–1 p) | Bangladesh | 2026 |
| Futsal Championship | 2026 | Maldives | RR | India | 2027 |
| South Asian Games | 2019 | Nepal | 2–1 | Bhutan | 2027 |
Women's national teams
| Women's Championship | 2026 | India | 3–1 | Bangladesh | 2028 |
| U-20 Women's Championship | 2026 | India | RR | Bangladesh | 2027 |
| U-17 Women's Championship | 2025 | India | RR | Bangladesh | 2026 |
| Women's Futsal Championship | 2026 | Bangladesh | RR | India | 2027 |
| South Asian Games | 2019 | India | 2–0 | Nepal | 2027 |
Men's club teams
| Club Championship | — | — | — | — | 2026 |
Women's club teams
| Women's Club Championship | 2025 | East Bengal (India) | 3–0 | (Nepal) APF | 2027 |

=== Titles by nation ===
As of 1 June 2025

| Nation | Men's national team | | | | | Women's national team | | | | | Club | Total |
| Nation | SAFF | SAG | U18/U19/U20 | U15/U16/U17 | Fut | SAFF | SAG | U18/U19/U20 | U15/U16/U17 | Fut | WCC | Total |
|---|---|---|---|---|---|---|---|---|---|---|---|---|
| India | 10 | 3 | 4 | 7 | 0 | 6 | 3 | 3 | 3 | 0 | 1 | 40 |
| Bangladesh | 1 | 2 | 2 | 2 | 0 | 2 | 0 | 4 | 2 | 1 | 0 | 15 |
| Nepal | 0 | 4 | 2 | 0 | 0 | 0 | 0 | 0 | 2 | 0 | 0 | 8 |
| Pakistan | 0 | 4 | 0 | 1 | 0 | 0 | 0 | 0 | 0 | 0 | 0 | 5 |
| Maldives | 2 | 0 | 0 | 0 | 1 | 0 | 0 | 0 | 0 | 0 | × | 3 |
| Sri Lanka | 1 | 0 | 0 | 0 | 0 | 0 | 0 | 0 | 0 | 0 | × | 1 |
| Bhutan | 0 | 0 | 0 | 0 | 0 | 0 | × | 0 | 0 | 0 | 0 | 0 |
Former member
| Afghanistan† | 1 | 0 | 0 | 0 | × | 0 | × | | | | | 1 |
Invited guest
| × | | | | | | | | 1 | × | | 1 | |
| 0 | × | | | | | | | | | | 0 | |
| 0 | × | | | | | | | | | | 0 | |
| Total | 14 | 13 | 8 | 9 | 1 | 7 | 3 | 6 | 7 | 1 | 1 | 68 |

Note: (†) Member from 2005 till 2015 , (††) The Russian Under-17 team was invited to the Under-17 tournament

== Medals (1993–2025) ==
Last Update: 2025 SAFF U-19 Championship

Exclude Football at the South Asian Games and SAFF Club Championship.

Without semifinal losers
| Rank | Nation | Gold | Silver | Bronze | Total |
|---|---|---|---|---|---|
| 1 | India (IND) | 26 | 10 | 6 | 42 |
| 2 | Bangladesh (BAN) | 10 | 13 | 4 | 27 |
| 3 | Nepal (NEP) | 4 | 12 | 8 | 24 |
| 4 | Maldives (MDV) | 2 | 3 | 2 | 7 |
| 5 | Pakistan (PAK) | 1 | 2 | 1 | 4 |
| 6 | Afghanistan (AFG) | 1 | 2 | 0 | 3 |
| 7 | Sri Lanka (SRI) | 1 | 1 | 0 | 2 |
| 8 | Russia (RUS) | 1 | 0 | 0 | 1 |
| 9 | Kuwait (KUW) | 0 | 1 | 0 | 1 |
| 10 | Bhutan (BHU) | 0 | 0 | 3 | 3 |
| Totals (10 entries) | | 46 | 44 | 24 | 114 |

With semifinal losers
| Rank | Nation | Gold | Silver | Bronze | Total |
|---|---|---|---|---|---|
| 1 | India (IND) | 26 | 10 | 7 | 43 |
| 2 | Bangladesh (BAN) | 10 | 13 | 12 | 35 |
| 3 | Nepal (NEP) | 4 | 12 | 16 | 32 |
| 4 | Maldives (MDV) | 2 | 3 | 9 | 14 |
| 5 | Pakistan (PAK) | 1 | 2 | 5 | 8 |
| 6 | Afghanistan (AFG) | 1 | 2 | 2 | 5 |
| 7 | Sri Lanka (SRI) | 1 | 1 | 7 | 9 |
| 8 | Russia (RUS) | 1 | 0 | 0 | 1 |
| 9 | Kuwait (KUW) | 0 | 1 | 0 | 1 |
| 10 | Bhutan (BHU) | 0 | 0 | 6 | 6 |
| 11 | Lebanon (LBN) | 0 | 0 | 1 | 1 |
| Totals (11 entries) | | 46 | 44 | 65 | 155 |

- Note: Bangladesh and India shared gold in 2024 SAFF U-19 Women's Championship.

== SAFF teams at continental and global tournaments ==
Legend

- 1st – Champion
- 2nd – Runner-up
- 3rd – Third place
- 4th – Fourth place
- QF – Quarterfinals
- R32 – Round of 32
- R16 – Round of 16
- GS – Group stage
- 1S – First knockout stage
- DQ – Disqualified / banned
- • — Did not qualify
- •• — Qualified but withdrew
- × — Did not enter / withdrawn
- ‡ — Tournament was unavailable for the nation that year
- — Hosts

For each tournament, the flag of the host country and the number of teams in each finals tournament (in brackets) are shown.

=== Men's ===
==== FIFA World Cup ====
FIFA World Cup record
| Team | 1930 (Uruguay) (13) | 1934 (Kingdom of Italy) (16) | 1938 (French Third Republic) (15) | 1950 (Fourth Brazilian Republic) (13) | 1954 (Switzerland) (16) | 1958 (Sweden) (16) | 1962 (Chile) (16) | 1966 (England) (16) | 1970 (Mexico) (16) | 1974 (West Germany) (16) | 1978 (Argentina) (16) | 1982 (Spain) (24) | 1986 (Mexico) (24) | 1990 (Italy) (24) | 1994 (United States) (24) | 1998 (France) (32) | 2002 (Japan) (South Korea) (32) | 2006 (Germany) (32) | 2010 (South Africa) (32) | 2014 (Brazil) (32) | 2018 (Russia) (32) | 2022 (Qatar) (32) | 2026 (Canada) (Mexico) (United States) (48) | 2030 (Morocco) (Portugal) (Spain) (Argentina) (Paraguay) (Uruguay) (48) | 2034 (Saudi Arabia) (48) | Total | Attempts |
|---|---|---|---|---|---|---|---|---|---|---|---|---|---|---|---|---|---|---|---|---|---|---|---|---|---|---|---|
| Bangladesh | Did not exist | | | | | | | | | Not a FIFA member | | × | • | • | • | • | • | • | • | • | • | • | • | TBD | TBD | 0 | 11 |
| Bhutan | Did not exist | | | | | | | | | | | | Not a FIFA member | | | | × | × | × | × | • | • | • | TBD | TBD | 0 | 3 |
| India | Not a FIFA member | | | •• | ‡ | × | × | × | × | × | × | × | • | × | • | • | • | • | • | • | • | • | • | TBD | TBD | 0 | 11 |
| Maldives | Did not exist | | | | | | | | | | | | Not a FIFA member | × | × | • | • | • | • | • | • | • | • | TBD | TBD | 0 | 8 |
| Nepal | Not a FIFA member | | | | | | | | | × | × | × | • | • | × | • | • | × | • | • | • | • | • | TBD | TBD | 0 | 9 |
| Pakistan | Did not exist | | | × | × | × | × | × | × | × | × | × | × | × | • | • | • | • | • | • | • | • | • | TBD | TBD | 0 | 9 |
| Sri Lanka | Did not exist | | | ‡ | × | × | × | × | × | × | × | × | × | × | • | • | • | • | • | • | • | • | • | TBD | TBD | 0 | 9 |
Former member
| Afghanistan | Not a FIFA member | | | Not a SAFF member | | | | | | | | | | | | | | • | • | • | Not a SAFF member | | | | | 0 | 3 |

==== FIFA ASEAN Cup ====
| Teams | (Indonesia) 2026 (7) | Total |
|---|---|---|
| Bangladesh | GS | 1 |
| Pakistan | GS | 1 |

==== AFC Asian Cup ====
| Team | (British Hong Kong) 1956 (4) | (South Korea) 1960 (4) | (Israel) 1964 (4) | (Iran) 1968 (5) | (Thailand) 1972 (6) | (Iran) 1976 (6) | (Kuwait) 1980 (10) | (Singapore) 1984 (10) | (Qatar) 1988 (10) | (Japan) 1992 (8) | (United Arab Emirates) 1996 (12) | (Lebanon) 2000 (12) | (China) 2004 (16) | (Indonesia) (Malaysia) (Thailand) (Vietnam) 2007 (16) | (Qatar) 2011 (16) | (Australia) 2015 (16) | (United Arab Emirates) 2019 (24) | (Qatar) 2023 (24) | (Saudi Arabia) 2027 (24) | Total |
|---|---|---|---|---|---|---|---|---|---|---|---|---|---|---|---|---|---|---|---|---|
| Bangladesh | Part of Pakistan | | | | × | × | GS | • | • | • | × | • | • | • | • | • | • | • | • | 1 |
| India | × | • | 2nd | • | × | × | × | GS | • | • | • | • | • | • | GS | • | GS | GS | • | 5 |

==== AFC Challenge Cup ====
| Teams | (Bangladesh) 2006 (16) | (India) 2008 (8) | (Sri Lanka) 2010 (8) | (Nepal) 2012 (8) | (Maldives) 2014 (8) | Total |
|---|---|---|---|---|---|---|
| Bangladesh | QF | • | GS | • | • | 2 |
| Bhutan | GS | • | • | • | • | 1 |
| India | QF | 1st | GS | GS | • | 4 |
| Maldives | ‡ | ‡ | • | GS | 3rd | 2 |
| Nepal | SF | GS | • | GS | • | 3 |
| Pakistan | GS | • | • | • | • | 1 |
| Sri Lanka | 2nd | GS | GS | • | • | 3 |
Former member
| Afghanistan | GS | GS | × | • | 4th | 3 |

==== AFC Solidarity Cup ====
| Teams | (Malaysia) 2016 (7) | Total |
|---|---|---|
| Bangladesh | × | 0 |
| Bhutan | ‡ | 0 |
| Nepal | 1st | 1 |
| Pakistan | × | 0 |
| Sri Lanka | GS | 1 |

==== Asian Games men's football tournament ====
Football at the Asian Games was a senior tournament until 1998.
Football at the Asian Games has been an under-23 tournament since 2002.

| Team | (India) 1951 (6) | (Philippines) 1954 (12) | (Japan) 1958 (14) | (Indonesia) 1962 (8) | (Thailand) 1966 (11) | (Thailand) 1970 (10) | (Iran) 1974 (15) | (Thailand) 1978 (14) | (India) 1982 (16) | (South Korea) 1986 (18) | (China) 1990 (14) | (Japan) 1994 (19) | (Thailand) 1998 (23) | (South Korea) 2002 (24) | (Qatar) 2006 (28) | (China) 2010 (24) | (South Korea) 2014 (29) | (Indonesia) 2018 (25) | (China) 2022 (23) | (Japan) 2026 (15) | Total |
|---|---|---|---|---|---|---|---|---|---|---|---|---|---|---|---|---|---|---|---|---|---|
| Bangladesh | Did not exist | | | | | | | 13th | 12th | 14th | 13th | | DQ | 20th | 24th | 24th | 20th | 15th | 20th | | 10 |
| India | 1st | 8th | 4th | 1st | 8th | 3rd | 13th | 8th | 6th | 16th | DQ | DQ | 16th | 10th | 14th | 14th | 26th | | 9th | | 16 |
| Maldives | Did not exist | | | | | | | | | | | | 20th | 22nd | 20th | 17th | 21st | | | | 5 |
| Nepal | | | | | | | | | 16th | 18th | | 18th | 17th | | | | 29th | 22nd | | | 6 |
| Pakistan | | 6th | 9th | | | | 11th | | | 17th | 14th | | | 23rd | 21st | 22nd | 24th | 17th | | | 10 |
Former member
| Afghanistan | Not a SAFF member | | | | | | | | | | | | | | | | 25th | Not a SAFF member | | | 1 |

=== Men's U-20 ===
==== AFC U-20 Asian Cup ====
| Team | (Federation of Malaya) 1959 | (Federation of Malaya) 1960 | (Thailand) 1961 | (Thailand) 1962 | (Federation of Malaya) 1963 | (South Vietnam) 1964 | (Japan) 1965 | (Philippines) 1966 | (Thailand) 1967 | (South Korea) 1968 | (Thailand) 1969 | (Philippines) 1970 | (Japan) 1971 | (Thailand) 1972 | (Iran) 1973 | (Thailand) 1974 | (Kuwait) 1975 | (Thailand) 1976 | (Iran) 1977 | (Bangladesh) 1978 | (Thailand) 1980 | (Thailand) 1982 |
|---|---|---|---|---|---|---|---|---|---|---|---|---|---|---|---|---|---|---|---|---|---|---|
| Bangladesh | × | × | × | × | × | × | × | × | × | × | × | × | × | × | × | × | GS | × | GS | GS | 5th | × |
| India | × | × | × | × | GS | GS | GS | QF | QF | GS | × | × | QF | GS | GS | 1st | GS | GS | QF | GS | • | • |
| Nepal | × | × | × | × | × | × | × | × | × | × | × | × | GS | GS | × | GS | × | × | × | × | • | • |
| Pakistan | × | × | × | GS | × | × | × | × | × | × | × | × | × | × | GS | × | × | × | × | × | × | • |
| Sri Lanka | 8th | × | GS | × | GS | × | × | GS | QF | × | GS | GS | × | × | × | × | × | GS | × | GS | × | × |

| Team | (United Arab Emirates) 1985 | (Saudi Arabia) 1986 | (Qatar) 1988 | (Indonesia) 1990 | (United Arab Emirates) 1992 | (Indonesia) 1994 | (South Korea) 1996 | (Thailand) 1998 | (Iran) 2000 | (Qatar) 2002 | (Malaysia) 2004 | (India) 2006 | (Saudi Arabia) 2008 | (China) 2010 | (United Arab Emirates) 2012 | (Myanmar) 2014 | (Bahrain) 2016 | (Indonesia) 2018 | 2023 | (China) 2025 | (China) 2027 | Total |
|---|---|---|---|---|---|---|---|---|---|---|---|---|---|---|---|---|---|---|---|---|---|---|
| Bangladesh | • | × | • | • | • | × | GS | • | • | GS | • | • | × | • | • | • | • | • | • | • | • | 6 |
| India | • | GS | '× | GS | GS | × | GS | GS | • | QF | GS | GS | • | • | • | • | • | • | • | • | Q | 23 |
| Nepal | × | • | × | • | • | × | • | • | • | • | GS | • | • | • | × | • | • | • | • | • | • | 4 |
| Pakistan | • | • | • | • | • | × | • | • | GS | • | • | • | • | • | • | × | × | × | × | × | × | 3 |
| Sri Lanka | × | GS | × | • | × | • | • | × | • | • | • | • | × | • | × | × | • | • | • | • | • | 10 |

=== Men's U-17 ===
==== FIFA U-17 World Cup ====
| Team | 1985 (China) (16) | 1987 (Canada) (16) | 1989 (Scotland) (16) | 1991 (Italy) (16) | 1993 (Japan) (16) | 1995 (Ecuador) (16) | 1997 (Egypt) (16) | 1999 (New Zealand) (16) | 2001 (Trinidad and Tobago) (16) | 2003 (Finland) (16) | 2005 (Peru) (16) | 2007 (South Korea) (24) | 2009 (Nigeria) (24) | 2011 (Mexico) (24) | 2013 (United Arab Emirates) (24) | 2015 (Chile) (24) | 2017 (India) (24) | 2019 (Brazil) (24) | 2023 (Indonesia) (24) | 2025 (Qatar) (48) | 2026 (Qatar) (48) | Total |
|---|---|---|---|---|---|---|---|---|---|---|---|---|---|---|---|---|---|---|---|---|---|---|
| India | • | • | • | • | • | • | • | • | • | • | • | • | • | • | • | • | GS | • | • | • | • | 1 |

==== AFC U-17 Asian Cup ====
| Team | 1985 | 1986 | 1988 | 1990 | 1992 | 1994 | 1996 | 1998 | 2000 | 2002 | 2004 | 2006 | 2008 | 2010 | 2012 | 2014 | 2016 | 2018 | 2023 | 2025 | 2026 | 2027 | Total |
|---|---|---|---|---|---|---|---|---|---|---|---|---|---|---|---|---|---|---|---|---|---|---|---|
| Bangladesh | × | GS | • | • | GS | • | • | GS | GS | × | GS | GS | DQ | • | • | × | • | • | • | • | • | • | 6 |
| India | • | • | • | GS | • | • | GS | • | • | QF | GS | • | GS | • | GS | • | GS | QF | GS | • | GS | Q | 11 |
| Nepal | • | × | • | • | • | × | × | • | GS | × | • | GS | • | • | • | GS | × | • | • | • | • | DQ | 3 |
| Pakistan | × | × | × | × | • | × | × | • | • | GS | × | • | • | • | • | • | × | × | • | × | • | • | 1 |

=== Women's ===
==== AFC Women's Asian Cup ====
| Team | (Hong Kong) 1975 (6) | (Taiwan) 1977 (6) | (India) 1980 (6) | (Hong Kong) 1981 (8) | (Thailand) 1983 (6) | (Hong Kong) 1986 (7) | (Hong Kong) 1989 (8) | (Japan) 1991 (9) | (Malaysia) 1993 (8) | (Malaysia) 1995 (11) | (China) 1997 (11) | (Philippines) 1999 (15) | (Chinese Taipei) 2001 (14) | (Thailand) 2003 (14) | (Australia) 2006 (9) | (Vietnam) 2008 (8) | (China) 2010 (8) | (Vietnam) 2014 (8) | (Jordan) 2018 (8) | (India) 2022 (12) | (Australia) 2026 (12) | (Uzbekistan) 2029 (12) | Total |
|---|---|---|---|---|---|---|---|---|---|---|---|---|---|---|---|---|---|---|---|---|---|---|---|
| Bangladesh | × | × | × | × | × | × | × | × | × | × | × | × | × | × | × | × | × | • | × | • | GS | TBD | 1 |
| India | × | × | 2nd | 3rd | 2nd | × | × | × | × | GS | GS | GS | GS | GS | • | • | • | • | • | •• (Note: India failed to name the required 13 players and were unable to play their match of the group stage against Chinese Taipei due to them having only fewer than 13 players left with the remaining team members testing positive for COVID-19. They were considered to have withdrawn from the competition, and all previous matches played by them were considered "null and void" and would not be considered in determining the final group rankings.) | GS | TBD | 10 |
| Nepal | × | × | × | × | × | GS | GS | × | × | × | × | GS | × | × | × | × | × | × | × | • | • | TBD | 3 |

==== Asian Games women's football tournament ====
| Team | (China) 1990 (6) | (Japan) 1994 (4) | (Thailand) 1998 (8) | (South Korea) 2002 (6) | (Qatar) 2006 (8) | (China) 2010 (7) | (South Korea) 2014 (11) | (Indonesia) 2018 (11) | (China) 2022 (16) | (Japan) 2026 (12) | Total |
|---|---|---|---|---|---|---|---|---|---|---|---|
| Bangladesh | | | | | | | | | 12th | 11th | 2 |
| India | | | 8th | | | | 9th | | 13th | | 3 |
| Maldives | | | | | DQ | | 11th | 10th | | | 2 |
| Nepal | | | | | | | | | 11th | | 1 |

=== Women's U-20 ===
==== AFC U-20 Women's Asian Cup ====
| Team | 2002 (India) (12) | 2004 (China) (15) | 2006 (Malaysia) (8) | 2007 (China) (8) | 2009 (China) (8) | 2011 (Vietnam) (6) | 2013 (China) (6) | 2015 (China) (8) | 2017 (China) (8) | 2019 (Thailand) (8) | 2024 (Uzbekistan) (8) | 2026 (Thailand) (12) | Total |
|---|---|---|---|---|---|---|---|---|---|---|---|---|---|
| Bangladesh | • | • | • | • | • | • | • | • | • | • | • | GS | 1 |
| India | GS | QF | GS | • | • | • | • | • | • | • | • | GS | 4 |
| Nepal | • | GS | • | • | • | • | • | • | • | • | • | • | 1 |

=== Women's U-17 ===
==== FIFA U-17 Women's World Cup ====
| Team | (New Zealand) 2008 (16) | (Trinidad and Tobago) 2010 (16) | (Azerbaijan) 2012 (16) | (Costa Rica) 2014 (16) | (Jordan) 2016 (16) | (Uruguay) 2018 (16) | (India) 2022 (16) | (Dominican Republic) 2024 (16) | (Morocco) 2025 (24) | (Morocco) 2026 (24) | Total |
|---|---|---|---|---|---|---|---|---|---|---|---|
| India | • | • | • | • | • | • | GS | • | • | • | 1 |

==== AFC U-17 Women's Asian Cup ====
| Team | 2005 (South Korea) (11) | 2007 (Malaysia) (6) | 2009 (Thailand) (8) | 2011 (China) (6) | 2013 (China) (12) | 2015 (China) (8) | 2017 (Thailand) (8) | 2019 (Thailand) (8) | 2024 (Indonesia) (8) | 2026 (China) (12) | 2027 (China) (12) | 2028 (China) (12) | Total |
|---|---|---|---|---|---|---|---|---|---|---|---|---|---|
| Bangladesh | GS | × | × | × | × | • | GS | GS | • | • | • | TBD | 3 |
| India | GS | × | • | • | • | • | • | • | • | QF | Q | TBD | 3 |

== Rankings ==
Rankings are calculated by FIFA.

=== Men's national teams ===
| SAFF | AFC | FIFA | Country | Points | +/− | Highest | Lowest |
|---|---|---|---|---|---|---|---|
| 1 | 26 | 141 | India | 1079.99 | Steady | 94 | 173 |
| 2 | 33 | 172 | Maldives | 935.93 | Steady | 124 | 183 |
| 3 | 36 | 178 | Nepal | 914.54 | ▼1 | 124 | 196 |
| 4 | 37 | 182 | Bangladesh | 892.86 | ▼1 | 110 | 197 |
| 5 | 38 | 185 | Sri Lanka | 885.67 | ▲3 | 122 | 207 |
| 6 | 41 | 192 | Bhutan | 870.81 | ▼6 | 159 | 209 |
| 7 | 44 | 197 | Pakistan | 844.59 | ▲1 | 141 | 205 |

- Last updated: 7 October 2026

=== Women's national teams ===
| SAFF | AFC | FIFA | Country | Points | +/− | Highest | Lowest |
|---|---|---|---|---|---|---|---|
| 1 | 13 | 69 | India | 1368.70 | Steady | 49 | 70 |
| 2 | 16 | 89 | Nepal | 1238.74 | ▼1 | 87 | 119 |
| 3 | 19 | 106 | Bangladesh | 1175.35 | ▲1 | 100 | 147 |
| 4 | 31 | 154 | Pakistan | 1008.65 | Steady | 106 | 161 |
| 5 | 35 | 161 | Bhutan | 933.09 | ▲3 | 113 | 178 |
| 6 | 37 | 165 | Sri Lanka | 915.58 | ▼3 | 101 | 162 |
| 7 | 39 | 167 | Maldives | 906.97 | Steady | 91 | 167 |

- Last updated: 16 June 2026

=== Men's futsal national teams ===
| SAFF | AFC | FIFA | Country | Points | +/− | Highest | Lowest |
|---|---|---|---|---|---|---|---|
| 1 | 24 | 99 | Maldives | 914.49 | Steady | 99 | 109 |
| 2 | 28 | 111 | Nepal | 866.35 | ▼1 | 110 | 121 |
| 3 | 35 | 130 | India | 777.49 | ▲ | 130 | 135 |
| 4 | 36 | 138 | Pakistan | 717.92 | Steady | 138 | 138 |
| 5 | 37 | 139 | Bangladesh | 702.59 | Steady | 139 | 139 |
| 6 | 38 | 140 | Sri Lanka | 674.86 | Steady | 140 | 140 |
| 7 | 39 | 141 | Bhutan | 674.42 | Steady | 141 | 141 |

- Last updated: 25 September 2026

=== Women's futsal national teams ===
| SAFF | AFC | FIFA | Country | Points | +/− | Highest | Lowest |
|---|---|---|---|---|---|---|---|
| 1 | 13 | 41 | Bangladesh | 931.34 | ▲ | 42 | 44 |
| 2 | 29 | 82 | India | 745.19 | ▲ | 79 | 87 |
| 3 | 30 | 88 | Bhutan | 705.55 | ▲ | 89 | 89 |
| 4 | 31 | 90 | Nepal | 699.9 | ▲ | 91 | 91 |
| 5 | 32 | 93 | Pakistan | 683.75 | ▲ | 94 | 94 |
| 6 | 33 | 94 | Sri Lanka | 670.13 | ▲ | 95 | 95 |
| 7 | 34 | 95 | Maldives | 649.07 | ▲ | 96 | 96 |

- Last updated: 25 September 2026

== Individual statistics ==
=== Top goalscorer in men's football ===
As of 1 September 2025

==== By number of goals ====
(players with at least 20 goals)

| # | Name | Career | Goals | Caps | Avg/game |
|---|---|---|---|---|---|
| 1 | (India) Sunil Chhetri (list) | 2005–2025 | 95 | 157 | 0.61 |
| 2 | (Maldives) Ali Ashfaq (list) | 2003–2023 | 58 | 98 | 0.59 |
| 3 | (India) I. M. Vijayan (list) | 1992–2004 | 29 | 70 | 0.41 |
| 4 | (Sri Lanka) Kasun Jayasuriya (list) | 2000–2009 | 27 | 55 | 0.49 |
| 4 | (India) Baichung Bhutia (list) | 1995–2011 | 27 | 82 | 0.33 |
| 6 | (India) Jeje Lalpekhlua (list) | 2009–2019 | 23 | 54 | 0.41 |
| 6 | (India) Shabbir Ali | 1974–1984 | 23 | 66 | 0.35 |

==== By country ====
(only highest goalscorers from each country)

| # | Name | Career | Goals | Caps | Avg/game |
|---|---|---|---|---|---|
| 1 | (India) Sunil Chhetri (list) | 2005–2025 | 95 | 157 | 0.61 |
| 2 | (Maldives) Ali Ashfaq (list) | 2003–2023 | 58 | 98 | 0.59 |
| 3 | (Sri Lanka) Kasun Jayasuriya (list) | 2000–2009 | 27 | 55 | 0.49 |
| 4 | (Pakistan) Muhammad Umer (list) | 1956–1965 | 18 | – | – |
| 5 | (Bangladesh) Ashraf Chunnu (list) | 1975–1985 | 17 | 41 | 0.41 |
| 6 | (Bhutan) **Chencho Gyeltshen** (list) | 2011–present | 15 | 49 | 0.31 |
| 7 | (Nepal) Ganesh Thapa (list) | 1981–1989 | 14 | 40 | 0.35 |

Players in bold are active international players.

=== Top goalscorer in women's football ===
As of 20 June 2024

==== By number of goals ====
(players with at least 30 goals)

| # | Name | Career | Goals | Caps | Avg/game |
|---|---|---|---|---|---|
| 1 | (Nepal) **Sabitra Bhandari** | 2014–present | 53 | 46 | 1.15 |
| 2 | (India) Bala Devi | 2007–2024 | 48 | 58 | 0.83 |
| 3 | (India) Sasmita Malik | 2007–2017 | 36 | 42 | 0.86 |
| 4 | (Bangladesh) **Sabina Khatun** | 2009–present | 34 | 53 | 0.64 |
| 5 | (India) Yumnam Kamala Devi | 2011–2022 | 36 | 51 | 0.71 |

==== By country ====
(only highest goalscorers from each country)

| # | Name | Career | Goals | Caps | Avg/game |
|---|---|---|---|---|---|
| 1 | (Nepal) **Sabitra Bhandari** | 2014–present | 53 | 46 | 1.15 |
| 2 | (India) Bala Devi | 2007–2024 | 48 | 58 | 0.83 |
| 3 | (Bangladesh) **Sabina Khatun** | 2009–present | 34 | 53 | 0.64 |

Players in bold are active international players.

== See also ==
- FIFA
  - Asian Football Confederation (AFC)
    - ASEAN Football Federation (AFF)
    - East Asian Football Federation (EAFF)
    - Central Asian Football Association (CAFA)
    - West Asian Football Federation (WAFF)
