= Gumpe Rime =

Indian football coach and footballer

Personal information
- Date of birth: 12 October 1975 (age 51)
- Place of birth: Aalo, Arunachal Pradesh, India
- Position: Goalkeeper

Team information
- Current team: India U23; RF Young Champs (Goalkeeping Coach)

Senior career*
Years	Team	Apps	(Gls)
1995–1998	Mahindra United	64	(0)
1999–2000	Vasco	48	(0)
2000–2001	HAL	30	(0)
2001–2002	ITI	32	(0)
2003–2004	Salgaocar	42	(0)
2004–2009	HAL	128	(0)
2009–2012	Shillong Lajong	68	(0)

Managerial career
- 2012–2013: Shillong Lajong (Goalkeeping Coach)
- 2013–2015: TFA (Goalkeeping Coach)
- 2015–2017: Shillong Lajong (Head of Youth Development)
- 2017–: RF Young Champs (Head of Goalkeeping)
- 2018–: India U-23 (Goalkeeping Coach)
- * Club domestic league appearances and goals

Gumpe Rime (born 12 October 1975) is an Indian football coach and former footballer. He currently serves as the Head Goalkeeping Coach at the Reliance Foundation Young Champs. He also serves as the goalkeeping coach of the India U-23 national team.

== Career ==
Rime started his professional career with Mahindra United and then went on to play for reputable clubs like Hindustan Aeronautics Limited S.C., Salgaocar, Vasco, and Shillong Lajong.

== Coaching career ==
Rime holds Asian Football Confederation's Pro License and has a specialisation in goalkeeping with an AFC Goalkeeping A Diploma. Rime has also served the national team as Goalkeeping coach for various age group NT (U-19s and U-23s) and also serves as a coach educator for AIFF/AFC C and B Diploma coaching course and also conducts all the goalkeeping coaching course under AIFF and AFC.
