= Tajikistan national under-23 football team =

National association football team

Tajikistan U23
- Nickname(s): The Crown (Persian: تاج, Tajik: Тоҷ); The Persian Lion (Persian: شیر پارسی,Tajik: шери порси)
- Association: Tajikistan Football Federation
- Confederation: AFC (Asia)
- Head coach: Khodadad Azizi
- Captain: Karomatullo Saidov
- FIFA code: TJK
First colours	Second colours	Third colours

AFC U-23 Asian Cup
- Appearances: 2 (first in 2022)
- Best result: Group stage (2022, 2024)

Asian Games
- Appearances: 2 (first in 2006)
- Best result: Round of 16 (2014)

The Tajikistan national U-23 football team represents Tajikistan in international U-23 football competitions. It is controlled by the Tajikistan Football Federation and is a member of the Asian Football Confederation.

== Competition history ==
=== Asian Games ===
Asian Games record
Host / Year	Result	Position	Pld	W	T	L	GF	GA
1951 – 1998	See Tajikistan national football team							
(South Korea) Busan 2002	Suspended by FIFA							
(Qatar) Doha 2006	Group stage	25th	3	1	2	0	7	3
(China) Guangzhou 2010	Did not participate							
(South Korea) Incheon 2014	Round of 16	13th	4	2	0	2	5	6
(Indonesia) Jakarta-Palembang 2018	Did not participate							
(China) Hangzhou 2022	Did not participate							
(Japan) Aichi-Nagoya 2026	Did not qualify							
(Qatar) Doha 2030	To be determined							
(Saudi Arabia) Riyadh 2034	To be determined							
Total	Round of 16	2/9	7	3	2	2	12	9

=== AFC U-23 Asian Cup ===
Asian Cup record
Year	Result	Position	Pld	W	T	L	GF	GA
2013 – 2020	Did not qualify							
(Uzbekistan) 2022	Group stage	16th	3	0	0	3	0	10
(Qatar) 2024	Group stage	10th	3	1	0	2	5	8
(Saudi Arabia) 2026	Did not qualify							
(Japan) 2028	To be determined							
Total	Group stage	2/8	6	1	0	5	5	18

== Recent fixtures ==
=== 2026 ===
25 March 2026 Friendly	Bhutan	v	Tajikistan	Yupia, India
––:–– IST				Stadium: Golden Jubilee Stadium

31 March 2026 Friendly	India	v	Tajikistan	Yupia, India
––:–– IST				Stadium: Golden Jubilee Stadium

== Coaching staff ==
As of 1 July 2021

Position	Name
Head coach	(Iran) Khodadad Azizi
Assistant coach	(Iran) Ali Hanteh
Goalkeeper coach	(Iran) Mehdi Vaezi
Physiotherapists	(Tajikistan) Saidjon Ergashev (Tajikistan) Davron Juraev
Team Doctor	(Tajikistan) Dr. Farrukh Avezov
Match analyst	(Tajikistan) Alifbek Beromov
Technical director	(Tajikistan) Salokhidin Gafurov

== Current squad ==
The following players were called up for the 2024 AFC U-23 Asian Cup.

No.	Pos.	Player	Date of birth (age)	Club
	GK	Mukhriddin Khasanov	23 September 2002 (age 24)	(Tajikistan Football Federation) Istiklol
	GK	Safarmad Gafforov	14 April 2004 (age 22)	(Tajikistan Football Federation) Khatlon
	GK	Mukhammadrabi Rakhmatulloev		(Tajikistan Football Federation) Ravshan
	DF	Manuchekhr Safarov	31 May 2001 (age 25)	(Uzbekistan Football Association) Neftchi Fergana
	DF	Jonibek Sharipov	15 January 2002 (age 24)	(Tajikistan Football Federation) CSKA Pamir
	DF	Sodikjon Kurbonov	19 January 2003 (age 23)	(Tajikistan Football Federation) Istiklol
	DF	Khaydar Sattorov	18 February 2003 (age 23)	(Tajikistan Football Federation) Khatlon
	DF	Bekmurod Khaytov	21 December 2003 (age 22)	(Tajikistan Football Federation) Khatlon
	DF	Mekhrubon Karimov	9 January 2004 (age 22)	(Georgian Football Federation) Samgurali Tsqaltubo
	DF	Rakhmatsho Rakhmatzoda	6 April 2004 (age 22)	(Tajikistan Football Federation) Ravshan
	DF	Fakhriddin Akhtamov	26 November 2004 (age 21)	(Tajikistan Football Federation) Khujand
	MF	Tokhirdzhon Tagoyzoda	9 October 2001 (age 25)	(Tajikistan Football Federation) Khosilot
	MF	Shukhrat Elmurodov	31 January 2002 (age 24)	(Tajikistan Football Federation) Regar-TadAZ
	MF	Alisher Shukurov	30 March 2002 (age 24)	(Georgian Football Federation) Dinamo Tbilisi
	MF	Shokhrukh Sangov	31 October 2002 (age 24)	(Tajikistan Football Federation) Khosilot
	MF	Amadoni Kamolov	16 January 2003 (age 23)	(Tajikistan Football Federation) Istiklol
	MF	Azizbek Khaitov	6 April 2003 (age 23)	(Tajikistan Football Federation) Ravshan
	MF	Ruslan Khayloev	29 October 2003 (age 23)	(Russian Football Union) Tyumen
	MF	Faridun Davlatov	12 February 2004 (age 22)	(Tajikistan Football Federation) Regar-TadAZ
	MF	Jomi Nazarov		(Royal Spanish Football Federation) CP Sarrià
	FW	Shahrom Samiev	8 February 2001 (age 25)	(Uzbekistan Football Association) Andijon
	FW	Mekhron Madaminov	1 May 2002 (age 24)	(Tajikistan Football Federation) Istiklol
	FW	Rustam Soirov	12 September 2002 (age 24)	(Tajikistan Football Federation) Istiklol
	FW	Daler Sharipov	13 February 2004 (age 22)	(Uzbekistan Football Association) Metallurg

== Head-to-head record ==
The following table shows Tajikistan's head-to-head record in the AFC U-23 Asian Cup.

Opponent	Pld	W	D	L	GF	GA	GD	Win %
Iraq	1	0	0	1	2	4	−2	0.00
Japan	1	0	0	1	0	3	−3	0.00
Saudi Arabia	2	0	0	2	2	9	−7	0.00
Thailand	1	1	0	0	1	0	+1	100.00
United Arab Emirates	1	0	0	1	0	2	−2	0.00
Total	6	1	0	5	5	18	−13	16.67
