= Sesehang Aangdembe =

Nepalese footballer

Sesehang Angadambe
Personal information
- Date of birth: 3 November 2000 (age 25)
- Place of birth: Nepal
- Position: Midfielder

Team information
- Current team: Tribhuvan Army Club
- Number: 23

Senior career*
Years	Team	Apps	(Gls)
2015–	Tribhuvan Army Club		
2021	Butwal Lumbini	4	(0)

International career^{‡}
2015	Nepal U16	3	(0)
2017	Nepal U19	3	(0)
2021	Nepal U23	1	(0)
2020–	Nepal	1	(0)
- * Club domestic league appearances and goals as of 10:11, 3 June 2022 (UTC) ‡ National team caps and goals as of 10:11, 5 June 2022 (UTC)

Sesehang Angadambe (born 3 November 2000) is a Nepalese professional footballer who plays as a midfielder for Martyr's Memorial A-Division League Tribhuvan Army Club and the Nepal national team.

== International career ==
He made his international debut against Bangladesh on 17 November 2020 in Dhaka.
