= Suman Aryal =

Nepali footballer

Personal information
- Date of birth: 31 January 2000 (age 26)
- Place of birth: Dumkibas, Nepal
- Height: 1.79 m (5 ft 10 1/2 in)
- Position: Defender

Team information
- Current team: Tribhuvan Army
- Number: 17

Senior career*
Years	Team	Apps	(Gls)
2018–2019	Nepal Police		
2019	Manang Marshyangdi		
2019–2022	Tribhuvan Army	20	(3)
2022-23	Butwal Lumbini	0	(0)
2022-	Nepal Army Club	1	(0)

International career^{‡}
2018	Nepal U23	3	(0)
2018–	Nepal	22	(0)
- * Club domestic league appearances and goals as of 19 October 2024 @ 19:19(AEST) ‡ National team caps and goals as of 16:46, 10 September 2021 (UTC)

Suman Aryal (born 31 January 2000) is a Nepali footballer who plays as a defender for Nepali club Tribhuvan Army and the Nepal national team.
