= Akash Budha Magar =

Nepalese footballer

Personal information
- Full name: chor
- Date of birth: 14 February 2002 (age 24)
- Place of birth: Ghorahi, Dang, Nepal
- Position: Midfielder

Team information
- Current team: Satdobato Youth Club

Senior career*
Years	Team	Apps	(Gls)
2019-2021	Nepal A.P.F. Club		
2021-	Satdobato Youth Club	13	(1)

International career^{‡}
2017	Nepal U16	3	(0)
2019	Nepal U19	3	(0)
2021 –	Nepal U23	1	(0)
2022 –	Nepal	1	(0)
- * Club domestic league appearances and goals as of 10:11, 3 June 2022 (UTC) ‡ National team caps and goals as of 10:11, 5 June 2022 (UTC)

Akash Budha Magar (born 14 February 2002) is a Nepalese professional footballer who plays as a midfielder for Martyr's Memorial A-Division League club Satdobato Youth Club and the Nepal national team. He made his international national debut against Mauritius on 29 January 2022 in Kathmandu.
