= Lila Lamgade =

Nepalese footballer

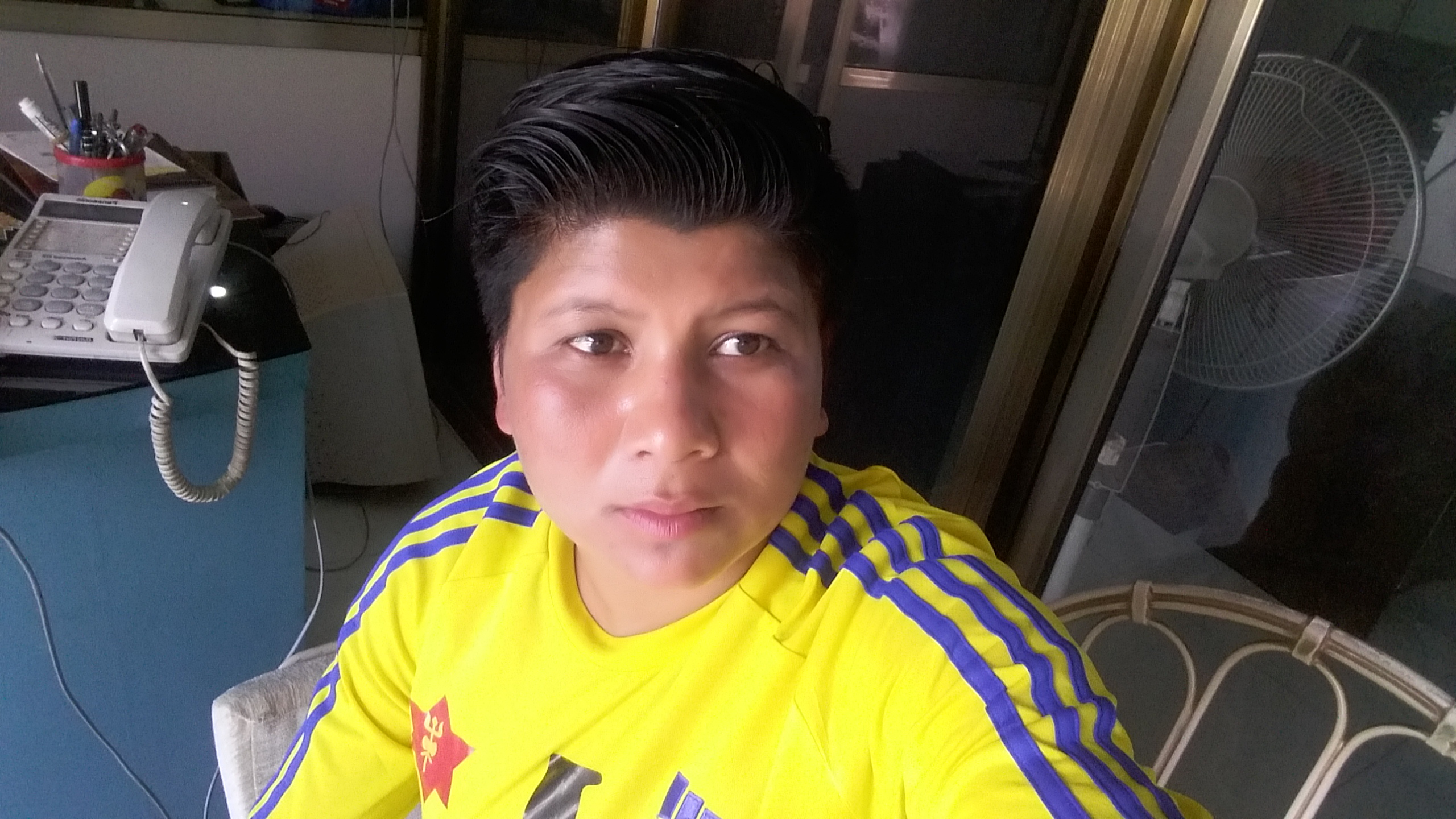

Personal information
- Full name: Lila Lamgade
- Place of birth: Morang, Nepal
- Height: 5 ft 4 in (1.63 m)
- Position: Goalkeeper

Senior career*
Years	Team	Apps	(Gls)
- Nepal Army Club

International career
2012	Nepal Women's National Team	?	(?)
2012—	Nepal		
- * Club domestic league appearances and goals

Lila Lamgade (Nepali:लिला लाम्गादे) (born 1991 in Morang, Nepal) is a Nepalese footballer who plays for the Nepal Army Club and the Nepal women's national football team.

== Career ==
Lamgade represented Nepal at the 2012 SAFF Women's Championship, playing in the final against India. It was her international debut.

She was the number one goalkeeper in the first official International friendly match of Nepal against Kuwait with an impressive win at Qadisiya Stadium, Hawalli.

Her impressive performance was seen at the South Asian Games 2016, where Nepal played a goalless draw against India in the league round keeping a clean sheet until the final.

She received the best keeper award at the women’s national league 2016. She had recently won the title of Best goalkeeper award at ANFA Women's league held on palpa and shyngja on 2017 where she played from the Taplejung district. Taplejung also dominated the individual award winning four of the five titles. Lamgade was named the best goalkeeper.

== Awards ==
- Sukriti Padak

Best Keeper Awards

- Women's League 2014
- Women’s national league 2016
- ANFA Women's league 2017
