= Chimi Dorji =

Bhutanese professional footballer

Personal information
- Full name: Chimi Dorji
- Date of birth: December 22, 1993 (age 32)
- Place of birth: Gelephu, Bhutan
- Height: 1.78 m (5 ft 10 in)
- Position: Defender

Team information
- Current team: Druk Star

Youth career
- 2008–2010: Druk Star

Senior career*
Years	Team	Apps	(Gls)
2011–2016	Druk Star		
2017–2018	Thimphu City		
2019–2023	Transport United		

International career^{‡}
2011–2023	Bhutan	16	(0)
- * Club domestic league appearances and goals ‡ National team caps and goals as of 3 October 2019

Chimi Dorji (born 22 December 1993) is a Bhutanese professional footballer, who last played for Transport United FC. He made his first appearance for the Bhutan national football team in 2009.
