= Golden Jubilee Stadium =

Football stadium in Yupia, India

- Interactive map of Golden Jubilee Stadium
- Full name: Golden Jubilee Outdoor Stadium
- Location: Yupia, Arunachal Pradesh, India
- Coordinates: 27.1692°N 93.7431°E
- Owner: Government of Arunachal Pradesh
- Operator: Arunachal Pradesh Football Association
- Capacity: 15,000
- Surface: Artificial turf

Tenants
- Arunachal Pradesh football team Arunachal Pradesh women's football team Indrajit Namchoom Arunachal League; Tadar Tang State Level Football Tournament

Golden Jubilee Stadium is a football stadium in Yupia, Arunachal Pradesh.

== Notable matches ==
It was a venue for the 77th Santosh Trophy. Matches of the 2023–24 Santosh Trophy final round were held at the stadium. It also hosts the 2025 SAFF U-19 Championship. It will also host 2026 U-23 Tri-Nation Championship.

== See also ==
- List of football stadiums in India
