= Yupia =

- Town
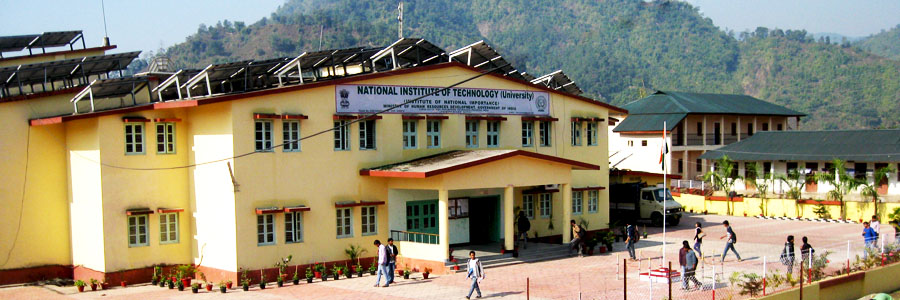
- NIT Arunachal Pradesh temporary campus and Golden Jubilee Stadium in Yupia

- Location in Arunachal Pradesh, India Yupia (India)
- Coordinates: 27.1692°N 93.7431°E
- Country: India
- State: Arunachal Pradesh

Languages
  - Official: English
- Time zone: UTC+5:30 (IST)
- Vehicle registration: AR
- Climate: Cwa

Yupia is a town that serves as the headquarters of Papum Pare district in the state of Arunachal Pradesh in India. Yupia is about 20 km from Itanagar, the state capital.

== Education ==
National Institute of Technology, Arunachal Pradesh is located here.

== See also ==
- Golden Jubilee Outdoor Stadium
