= Nepal national under-23 football team =

Nepal U-23
- Association: All Nepal Football Association
- Confederation: AFC (Asia)
- Sub-confederation: SAFF (South Asia)
- Head coach: Nabin Neupane
- Captain: Kiran Chemjong
- Home stadium: Dasarath Rangasala Stadium
- FIFA code: NEP
| First colours | Second colours |

Nepal national under-23 football team, also known as Nepal under-23s or Nepal U23(s), represents Nepal in association football at national and Olympic games and is controlled by ANFA, the governing body for football in Nepal, and the Nepal Olympic Committee.

== History ==
The team serves as the feeder team for the Nepal national football team squad, accommodating players aged 23 and under. However, up to three senior players may also be selected. Besides this, there are national teams for the Under-20s, Under-17s, and Under-15s. Players who meet the eligibility criteria can participate at various levels, making it possible for one to play for the U-23s, then the senior team, and return to the U-23s again.

== Home stadium ==
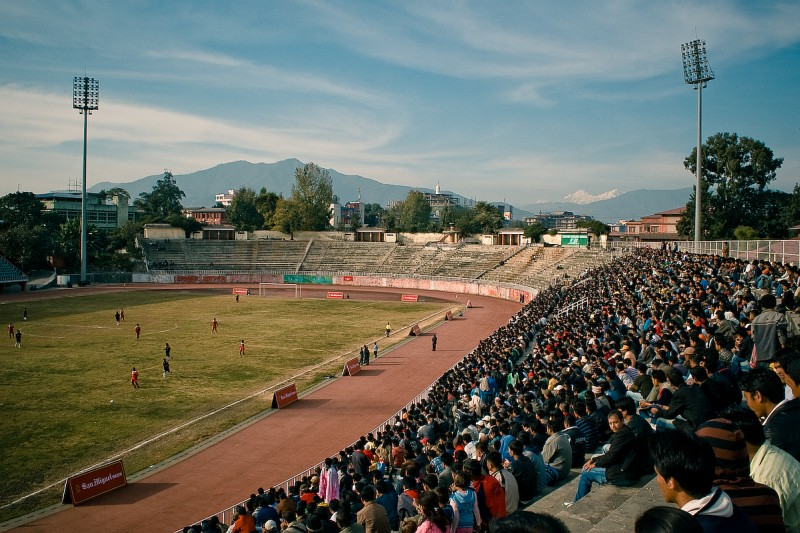
The stadium at daytime

The team's home ground is the Dasarath Rangasala Stadium, a multi-purpose stadium in Tripureswor, Kathmandu, Nepal. Holding 25,000 spectators, of which 5,000 seated, it is the biggest stadium in Nepal. It is named after Dashrath Chand, one of the martyrs of Nepal.

Most recently, the stadium was used as a primary venue for the 2012 AFC Challenge Cup and the 2013 SAFF Championship, with the Halchowk Stadium hosting some of the matches as well.

Apart from sporting events, the stadium is also used as a music venue for cultural events with Bryan Adams being the most notable act that performed at the site.

Prior to the 2013 SAFF Championship in Nepal, the Dasarath Rangasala underwent heavy renovation that saw several improvements such as the expansion of seats from 20,000 to 25,000.

== Recent results and fixtures ==
Win Draw Lose

== Coaching staff ==
As of 20 March 2025

| Position | Name |
|---|---|
| Team manager | (Nepal) |
| Head coach | (Serbia) (Nepal) Nabin Neupane |
| Assistant coach | (Nepal) |
| Technical Analyst | (Serbia) Veljko Singh |
| Goalkeeping coach | (Nepal) |
| Physiotherapist | (Nepal) |
| Team Doctor | (Nepal) |
| Team Official | (Nepal) |
| Media Manager | (Nepal) |

== Current squad ==
The following players were called up for the 2022 AFC U-23 Asian Cup qualification on 17 October 2021.

| No. | Pos. | Player | Date of birth (age) | Caps | Goals | Club |
|---|---|---|---|---|---|---|
| | GK | Arpan Karki | 24 January 2000 (age 26) | | | (All Nepal Football Association) Nepal Police Club |
| | GK | Bishal Sunar | 9 February 2002 (age 24) | | | (All Nepal Football Association) Manang Marshyangdi Club |
| | GK | Abhishek Baral | 9 April 2000 (age 26) | | | (All Nepal Football Association) |
| | DF | Gautam Shrestha | 21 February 2000 (age 26) | | | (All Nepal Football Association) Nepal Army F.C. |
| | DF | Rajan Gurung | 15 April 2000 (age 26) | | | (All Nepal Football Association) APF F.C. |
| | DF | Shiva Gurung | | | | (All Nepal Football Association) |
| | DF | Randip Poudel | 6 October 2002 (age 24) | | | (All Nepal Football Association) Brigade Boys Club |
| | DF | Anil Maharjan | 9 April 2001 (age 25) | | | (All Nepal Football Association) Friends Club |
| | DF | Suman Aryal | 31 January 2000 (age 26) | | | (All Nepal Football Association) Nepal Army F.C. |
| | DF | Abhishek Limbu | 21 August 1999 (age 27) | | | (All Nepal Football Association) Chyasal Youth Club |
| | MF | Nitin Thapa | 7 February 2002 (age 24) | | | (All Nepal Football Association) Chyasal Youth Club |
| | MF | Arik Bista | 17 March 2000 (age 26) | | | (All Nepal Football Association) New Road Team |
| | MF | Suraj Jeu Thakuri | 19 December 2000 (age 25) | | | (All Nepal Football Association) Jawalakhel YC |
| | MF | Ayush Ghalan | 21 February 2004 (age 22) | | | (All Nepal Football Association) Three Star Club |
| | MF | Sesehang Aangdembe | 3 November 2000 (age 25) | | | (All Nepal Football Association) Nepal Army F.C. |
| | MF | Rajiv Lopchan | 10 September 2000 (age 26) | | | (All Nepal Football Association) APF F.C. |
| | MF | Sishir Lekhi | 4 April 2002 (age 24) | | | (All Nepal Football Association) Brigade Boys Club |
| | MF | Akash Budha Magar | 14 February 2002 (age 24) | | | (All Nepal Football Association) Satdobato Youth Club |
| | MF | Roshan Pahari | 13 September 1999 (age 27) | | | (All Nepal Football Association) Boys Union Club |
| | FW | Ritik Kumar Khadka | 23 April 2001 (age 25) | | | (All Nepal Football Association) Three Star Club |
| | FW | Manish Dangi | 17 September 2001 (age 25) | | | (All Nepal Football Association) Machhindra F.C. |
| | FW | Abhishek Rijal | 29 January 2000 (age 26) | | | (All India Football Federation) Aizawl FC |
| | FW | Darshan Gurung | 20 August 2002 (age 24) | | | (All Nepal Football Association) New Road Team |

== Tournament records ==
=== Olympic Games ===
Summer Olympic Games Record
| Year | Result | Position | Pld | W | D | L | GF | GA |
|---|---|---|---|---|---|---|---|---|
| (Spain) 1992 | Did not qualify | | | | | | | |
| (United States) 1996 | Did not enter | | | | | | | |
| (Australia) 2000 | Did not qualify | | | | | | | |
| (Greece) 2004 | Did not qualify | | | | | | | |
| (China) 2008 | Did not enter | | | | | | | |
| (United Kingdom) 2012 | Did not enter | | | | | | | |
| (Brazil) 2016 | Did not qualify | | | | | | | |
| (Japan) 2020 | Did not qualify | | | | | | | |
| (France) 2024 | Did not qualify | | | | | | | |
| (United States) 2028 | To be determined | | | | | | | |
| Total | | 0 / 6 | | | | | | |

Note

- Olympic football events at U-23 level came into effect during the 1992 Summer Olympics, 2002 Asian Games, and the 2004 South Asian Games.

*Denotes draws include knockout matches decided on penalty kicks.
**Red border color indicates tournament was held on home soil.

=== AFC U-23 Asian Cup ===
| AFC U-23 Asian Cup finals record | | | | | | | | | | AFC U-23 Asian Cup qualifying record | | | | | | | | |
| Year | Result | Pts | Pld | W | D | L | GF | GA | GD | Result | Pts | Pld | W | D | L | GF | GA | GD |
|---|---|---|---|---|---|---|---|---|---|---|---|---|---|---|---|---|---|---|
| (Oman) 2013 | Did not qualify | | | | | | | | | 4th (Group D) | 3 | 4 | 1 | 0 | 3 | 6 | 9 | −3 |
| (Qatar) 2016 | Did not qualify | | | | | | | | | 5th (Group C) | 0 | 4 | 0 | 0 | 4 | 0 | 17 | −17 |
| (China) 2018 | Did not qualify | | | | | | | | | 4th (Group D) | 0 | 4 | 0 | 0 | 4 | 0 | 9 | −9 |
| (Thailand) 2020 | Did not qualify | | | | | | | | | 4th (Group A) | 0 | 3 | 0 | 0 | 3 | 0 | 8 | −8 |
| (Uzbekistan) 2022 | Did not qualify | | | | | | | | | 4th (Group B) | 0 | 3 | 0 | 0 | 3 | 0 | 14 | −14 |
| (Qatar) 2024 | Did not enter | | | | | | | | | Withdrawn | | | | | | | | |
| (Saudi Arabia) 2026 | Did not qualify | | | | | | | | | Group K | 0 | 3 | 0 | 0 | 3 | 2 | 12 | −10 |
| (Japan) 2028 | To be determined | | | | | | | | | To be determined | | | | | | | | |
| Total | 0/0 | 0 | 0 | 0 | 0 | 0 | 0 | 0 | 0 | 6/8 | 3 | 15 | 1 | 0 | 14 | 8 | 47 | −39 |

=== Asian Games ===
| Host/Year | Result | Pts | GP | W | D* | L | GF | GA | GD |
|---|---|---|---|---|---|---|---|---|---|
| 1966 to 1998 | See Nepal national team | | | | | | | | |
| (South Korea) 2002 | Withdrew | | | | | | | | |
| (Qatar) 2006 | Withdrew | | | | | | | | |
| (China) 2010 | Withdrew | | | | | | | | |
| (South Korea) 2014 | Round 1 | 0 | 3 | 0 | 0 | 3 | 0 | 13 | –13 |
| (Indonesia) 2018 | Round 1 | 0 | 3 | 0 | 0 | 3 | 1 | 5 | –4 |
| (China) 2022 | did not enter | | | | | | | | |
| Total | 2/4 | 0 | 6 | 0 | 0 | 6 | 0 | 18 | –17 |

=== South Asian Games ===
| Host/Year | Result | Pts | GP | W | D* | L | GF | GA | GD |
|---|---|---|---|---|---|---|---|---|---|
No age bar restriction before 1999, Senior national teams only.
| (Pakistan) 2004 | No medal | 1 | 2 | 0 | 1 | 1 | 0 | 1 | -1 |
| (Sri Lanka) 2006 | Bronze | 8 | 5 | 2 | 2 | 1 | 9 | 4 | +5 |
| (Bangladesh) 2010 | No medal | 3 | 3 | 1 | 0 | 2 | 2 | 4 | -2 |
| (India) 2016 | Gold | 9 | 4 | 3 | 0 | 1 | 12 | 6 | +6 |
| (Nepal) 2019 | Gold | 10 | 4 | 3 | 1 | 0 | 8 | 2 | +6 |
| (Pakistan) 2025 | TBD | | | | | | | | |
| Total | - | 31 | 18 | 9 | 5 | 6 | 31 | 17 | +14 |

== Honours ==
- South Asian Games
  - Champions (2): 2016, 2019

== See also ==
- All Nepal Football Association
- Nepal national football team
- Nepal national under-17 football team
- Nepal national under-20 football team
