= India women's national football team results (2010–2019) =

This article shows the results of India women's national football team from 2010 to 2019.

Legend

Win Draw Loss

Only Senior A international matches are listed here.

== 2010 ==
29 January 2010 S.A Games	India	8–1	Sri Lanka	Dhaka, Bangladesh
	Mandakini Devi 9', 56', 59'; Sasmita Malik 45'; Yumnam Kamala Devi 51'; Naobi Chanu 82', 83'; Pinky Bompal Magar 90'	Report	?	Stadium: Bangabandhu National Stadium

31 January 2010 S.A Games	India	6–0	Pakistan	Dhaka, Bangladesh
	Sasmita Malik 7', 28'; Bembem Devi 10', 11', 17'; Naobi Chanu 90'			Stadium: Bangabandhu National Stadium

4 February 2010 S.A Games	India	5–0	Nepal	Dhaka, Bangladesh
	Sasmita Malik; Tababi Devi; Naobi Chanu			Stadium: Bangabandhu National Stadium

6 February 2010 S.A Games	Bangladesh	0–7	India	Dhaka, Bangladesh
			Naobi Chanu; Mandakini Devi; Yumnam Kamala Devi; Geetarani Chanu	Stadium: Bangabandhu National Stadium

8 February 2010 S.A Games	India	3–1	Nepal	Dhaka, Bangladesh
	Naobi Chanu; Oinam Bembem Devi			Stadium: Bangabandhu National Stadium

13 December 2010 SAFF W	India	18–0	Bhutan	Cox's Bazar, Bangladesh
	Sasmita Malik; Bala Devi; Tababi Devi; Pinky Bompal Magar; Amoolya Kamal	Report		Stadium: Bir Shrestha Shahid Ruhul Amin Stadium

15 December 2010 SAFF W	India	7–0	Sri Lanka	Cox's Bazar, Bangladesh
	Bala Devi 2'; Sasmita Malik 18', 30', 45'; Pinky Bompal Magar 51', 60'; Tababi Devi 49'	Report		Stadium: Bir Shrestha Shahid Ruhul Amin Stadium

17 December 2010 SAFF W	Bangladesh	0–6	India	Cox's Bazar, Bangladesh
		Report	Kamala Devi 7', 18', 26'; Sasmita Mallik 23', 43'; Tababi Devi 39'	Stadium: Bir Shrestha Shahid Ruhul Amin Stadium

21 December 2010 SAFF W	India	8–0	Pakistan	Cox's Bazar, Bangladesh
	Bala Devi 18', 31', 32'; Gayatri 26', 39'; Sasmita 33'; Amoolya 45'; Manpreet 88'	Report		Stadium: Bir Shrestha Shahid Ruhul Amin Stadium

23 December 2010 SAFF W	India	1–0	Nepal	Cox's Bazar, Bangladesh
	Sasmita Malik 65'	Report		Stadium: Bir Shrestha Shahid Ruhul Amin Stadium

== 2011 ==
18 March 2011 2012 Olympics Q	Bangladesh	0–3	India	Dhaka, Bangladesh
16:30 UTC+6		AFC	Bala Devi 52', 70', 90+2'	Stadium: Bangabandhu National Stadium; Attendance: 1,000; Referee: Semaksuk Praew (Thailand)

22 March 2011 2012 Olympics Q	India	1–1	Uzbekistan	Dhaka, Bangladesh
16:30 UTC+6	Tababi Devi 69'	AFC	Riskieva 77'	Stadium: Bangabandhu National Stadium; Attendance: 1,000; Referee: Pannipar Kamnueng (Thailand)

23 March 2011 2012 Olympics Q	India	1–5	Uzbekistan	Dhaka, Bangladesh
7:00 UTC+6	Bembem Devi 41'	AFC	Lagutkina 57', 60'; Karachik 72'; Turdiboeva 75'; Sarikova 77'	Stadium: Bangabandhu National Stadium; Attendance: 100; Referee: Semaksuk Praew (Thailand)

17 September 2011 Friendly	Bahrain	1–2	India	Manama, Bahrain
	Reem Al-Hashmi	Report	Sasmita Malik 3', 35'	Stadium: Al Ahli Stadium

20 September 2011 Friendly	Bahrain	2–0	India	Manama, Bahrain
	Deena Abdulrahman; Manar Ebrahim			Stadium: Al Ahli Stadium

23 September 2011 Friendly	Bahrain	1–3	India	Manama, Bahrain
	Mona Al Daesi 81'		Pinky Bompal Magar 69'; Parmeshwori Devi 72'; Kamala Devi 86'	Stadium: Bahrain National Stadium

== 2012 ==
7 September 2012 SAFF W	India	3–0	Bangladesh	Colombo, Sri Lanka
8:30 SLST	Kamala Devi 64'; Bembem Devi 76'; Alochana Senapati 89'	AIFF Report		Stadium: CR & FC Grounds

9 September 2012 SAFF W	India	5–0	Sri Lanka	Colombo, Sri Lanka
8:30 SLST	Suprava Samal 17'; Rinaroy Devi 32', 51'; Pinky Bompal Magar 53'; Prameshwori Devi 56'	AIFF		Stadium: CR & FC Grounds

11 September 2012 SAFF W	Bhutan	0–11	India	Colombo, Sri Lanka
8:30 SLST		AIFF	Tuli Goon 13'; Kamala Devi 23', 30'; Sasmita Mallik 27' (pen.); Pinky Bompal Magar 38', 49', 65'; Prameshwori Devi 42', 64'; Montesori Chanu 63'; Supriya Routray 73'	Stadium: CR & FC Grounds

14 September 2012 SAFF W SF	India	11–0	Afghanistan	Colombo, Sri Lanka
8:30 SLST	Kamala Devi 5', 57', 90'; Prameshwori Devi 31'; Bembem Devi 40', 61', 70'; Sasmita Mallik 43', 78'; Romi Devi 59'; Pinky Bompal Magar 81'	AIFF		Stadium: CR & FC Grounds

16 September 2012 SAFF W F	India	3–1	Nepal	Colombo, Sri Lanka
	Supriya Routray 8'; Bembem Devi 66'; Kamala Devi 83'	AIFF	Dipa Adhikari 3'	Stadium: CR & FC Grounds

== 2013 ==
14 May 2013 Friendly	Bahrain	1–2	India	Manama, Bahrain
	Reem Al-Hashmi 42'		Pinky Bompal Magar 8'; Kamala Devi 36'

16 May 2013 Friendly	Bahrain	0–2	India	Manama, Bahrain
			Prameshwori Devi 56'; Kamala Devi 71'

21 May 2013 2014 AFCW Q	Myanmar	2–0	India	Al-Ram, Palestine
20:00	Naw Ar Lo Wer Phaw 6'; Khin Moe Wai 26'	AFC Report		Stadium: Faisal Al-Husseini International Stadium; Attendance: 150; Referee: Mai Hoang Trang (Vietnam)

23 May 2013 2014 AFCW Q	India	1–2	Chinese Taipei	Al-Ram, Palestine
20:00	Sasmita Mallik 54'	AFC Report	Yu Hsiu-chin 42'; Lai Li-chin 82'	Stadium: Faisal Al-Husseini International Stadium; Attendance: 100; Referee: Edita Mirabidova (Uzbekistan)

25 May 2013 2014 AFCW Q	Palestine	1–1	India	Al-Ram, Palestine
17:00	Sohgian 46' (pen.)	AFC Report	Sasmita Mallik 35'	Stadium: Faisal Al-Husseini International Stadium; Attendance: 150; Referee: Mai Hoang Trang (Vietnam)

== 2014 ==
14 September 2014 Asian Games	India	15–0	Maldives	Incheon, South Korea
14:00	Sasmita Malik 5', 21', 26', 80', 88'; Kamala Devi 18', 23', 31', 45+2', 65'; Bala Devi 20', 45+1'; Ashalata Devi 53'; Bembem Devi 55'; Prameshwori Devi 90+4'	AIFF		Stadium: Namdong Asiad Rugby Field; Referee: Nami Imaizumi (Japan)

17 September 2014 Asian Games	South Korea	10–0	India	Incheon, South Korea
20:00	Jeon Ga-eul 7', 40', 61' (pen.); Yoo Young-a 9', 45', 63', 65'; Park Hee-young 36'; Jung Seol-bin 49', 79'	AIFF		Stadium: Namdong Asiad Rugby Field; Referee: Fusako Kajiyama (Japan)

21 September 2014 Asian Games	Thailand	10–0	India	Incheon, South Korea
17:00	Romyen 8', 9', 16', 39'; Sungngoen 24' (pen.), 27', 28', 35'; Sornsai 47'; Seesraum 90+2'			Stadium: Namdong Asiad Rugby Field; Referee: Mai Hoàng Trang (Vietnam)

13 November 2014 SAFF W	India	8–0	Maldives	Islamabad, Pakistan
	Bala Devi 24', 46', 72', 74'; Kamala Devi 64', 85'; Bembem Devi 76'; Jyoti Ann Burrett 90'			Stadium: Jinnah Sports Stadium, Islamabad

15 November 2014 SAFF W	India	5–1	Bangladesh	Islamabad, Pakistan
	Umapati Devi 46'; Mandakini Devi 48'; Bala Devi 57', 86'; Indumathi 76'		Sabina Khatun 50'	Stadium: Jinnah Sports Stadium

17 November 2014 SAFF W	Afghanistan	0–12	India	Islamabad, Pakistan
			Indumathi 3', 7', 51'; Bala Devi 4', 12', 33', 39', 84'; Prameshowri Devi 29', 45+2', 69'; Mandakani Devi 88'	Stadium: Jinnah Sports Stadium

19 November 2014 SAFF W SF	India	5–0	Sri Lanka	Islamabad, Pakistan
	Indumathi 23', 69'; Bala Devi 31'; Prameshowri Devi 48'; Kamala Devi 72'			Stadium: Jinnah Sports Stadium

21 November 2014 SAFF W F	India	6–0	Nepal	Islamabad, Pakistan
	Kamala Devi 26'; Bala Devi 40', 41', 51', 90+1'; Prameshwori Devi 47'			Stadium: Jinnah Sports Stadium

== 2015 ==
13 March 2015 2016 Olympics Q	India	4–0	Sri Lanka	Mandalay, Myanmar
17:00	Kamala Devi 12'; Ashalata Devi 16'; Imesha Madushani Withanage 48' (o.g.); Radharani Devi 58'	AFC		Stadium: Mandalarthiri Stadium; Attendance: 839; Referee: Nami Imaizumi (Japan)

15 March 2015 2016 Olympics Q	Myanmar	7–0	India	Mandalay, Myanmar
17:00	Khin Moe Wai 8'; Khin Marlar Tun 15', 61'; Naw Ar Lo Wer Phaw 21'; Yee Yee Oo 28', 77'; Win Theingi Tun 90+2'	AFC		Stadium: Mandalarthiri Stadium; Attendance: 5,003; Referee: Pannipar Kamnueng (Thailand)

== 2016 ==
5 February 2016 S.Asian Games	India	0–0	Maldives	Shillong, India
13:30				Stadium: Jawaharlal Nehru Stadium (Shillong); Attendance: 5000

9 February 2016 S.Asian Games	India	5–0	Sri Lanka	Shillong, India
16:00	Hasara Dilrangi 24' (o.g.); Grace Dangmei 45+1', 58'; Yumnam Kamala Devi 60'; Sasmita Malik 73' (pen.)			Stadium: Jawaharlal Nehru Stadium (Shillong)

11 February 2016 S.Asian Games	Nepal	0–0	India	Shillong, India
11:00				Stadium: Jawaharlal Nehru Stadium (Shillong)

13 February 2016 S.Asian Games	India	5–1	Bangladesh	Shillong, India
16:00	Yumnam Kamala Devi 6', 37'; Ngangom Bala Devi 13', 75'; Sanju Yadav 74'		Sabina Khatun 65'	Stadium: Jawaharlal Nehru Stadium (Shillong)

15 February 2016 S.Asian Games	Nepal	0–4	India	Shillong, India
16:00			Yumnam Kamala Devi 32', 56'; Ngangom Bala Devi 71'; Loitongbam Ashalata Devi 80'	Stadium: Jawaharlal Nehru Stadium (Shillong); Attendance: 23000

27 December 2016 2016 SAFF WC	India	5–1	Afghanistan	Siliguri, India
	Yumnam Kamala Devi 3', 32'; Sasmita Malik 29'; Grace Dangmei 45+2'; Sanju Yadav 90+2'		Muhtaz Farkhunda 88'	Stadium: Kanchenjunga Stadium

31 December 2016 2016 SAFF WC	India	0–0	Bangladesh	Siliguri, India
				Stadium: Kanchenjunga Stadium

== 2017 ==
2 January 2017 2016 SAFF WC	Nepal	1–3	India	Siliguri, India
	Sabitra Bhandari 75' (pen.)	Report	Yumnam Kamala Devi 45'; Indumathi Kathiresan 58'; Sasmita Malik 83'	Stadium: Kanchenjunga Stadium

4 January 2017 2016 SAFF WC	India	3–1	Bangladesh	Siliguri, India
	Grace Dangmei 12'; Sasmita Malik 60' (pen.); Indumathi Kathiresan 67'	Report	Sirat Jahan Shopna 40'	Stadium: Kanchenjunga Stadium

3 April 2017 2018 AFCW Q	North Korea	8–0	India	Pyongyang, North Korea
15:00	Ri Un-yong 7'; Ri Kyong-hyang 13'; Ri Hyang-sim 21'; Kim Phyong-hwa 45+1', 78'; Wi Jong-sim 48', 64' (pen.); Sung Hyang-sim 80'	Report		Stadium: Kim Il-sung Stadium; Attendance: 15,000; Referee: Bui Thi Thu Trang (Vietnam)

5 April 2017 2018 AFCW Q	India	0–10	South Korea	Pyongyang, North Korea
18:00		Report	Kang Yu-mi 12'; Lee Min-a 19'; Lee Geum-min 29', 36', 67'; Lee Eun-mi 45+1'; Yoo Young-a 65'; Ji So-yun 68', 90+1'; Lee So-dam 69'	Stadium: Kim Il-sung Stadium; Attendance: 2,500; Referee: Lee Yi-chi (Chinese Taipei)

7 April 2017 2018 AFCW Q	Uzbekistan	7–1	India	Pyongyang, North Korea
18:00	Karachik 3', 6'; Sarikova 11', 44'; Zoirova 19'; Narbekova 63'; Turdiboeva 90+2' (pen.)	Report	Bala Devi 22'	Stadium: Kim Il-sung Stadium; Attendance: 600; Referee: Yu Hong (China)

11 April 2017 2018 AFCW Q	India	2–0	Hong Kong	Pyongyang, North Korea
15:00	Sasmita Malik 68' (pen.); Ratanbala Devi 70'	Report		Stadium: Kim Il-sung Stadium; Attendance: 50; Referee: Yu Hong (China)

31 July 2017 Friendly	India	2–0	Malaysia	Kuala Lumpur, Malaysia
	Pyari Xaxa 79', 86'	Report		Stadium: MP Selayang Stadium

== 2018 ==
8 November 2018 2020 Olympics Q	India	1–1	Nepal	Yangon, Myanmar
14:00 IST	Kamala Devi 37'	AFC	Niru Thapa 11'	Stadium: Thuwunna Stadium; Attendance: 150; Referee: Lee Yi-Chi (Taiwan)

11 November 2018 2020 Olympics Q	Bangladesh	1–7	India	Yangon, Myanmar
14:00 IST	Krishna Rani 81'	AFC	Kamala Devi 16' (pen.), 53'; Bala Devi 22', 23', 62', 75'; Sanju 73'	Stadium: Thuwunna Stadium; Attendance: 100; Referee: Mi Siyu (China)

13 November 2018 2020 Olympics Q	Myanmar	2–1	India	Yangon, Myanmar
17:00 IST	Win Theingi Tun 3'; Nge Nge Htwe 83'	AFC	Ratanbala Devi 24'	Stadium: Thuwunna Stadium; Attendance: 1,698; Referee: Ri Hyang-ok (DPR Korea)

== 2019 ==
21 January 2019 Friendly	India	5–2	Hong Kong	Hong Kong
18:00 IST	Grace Dangmei 6', 22'; Sanju Yadav 45'; Sumithra Kamaraj 82'; Ratanbala Devi 83'	Report	Cheung Wai Ki 17'; Chung Pui Ki 70'

23 January 2019 Friendly	Hong Kong	0–1	India	Hong Kong
		AIFF; Report	Pyari Xaxa 68'

27 January 2019 Friendly	India	3–0	Indonesia	Tangerang, Indonesia
14:30 IST	Ratanbala Devi 67', 70', 78'	Report		Stadium: Benteng Taruna Stadium

30 January 2019 Friendly	Indonesia	0–2	India	Tangerang, Indonesia
		Report	Sanju Yadav 20'; Grace Dangmei 90+2'	Stadium: Benteng Taruna Stadium

9 February 2019 Gold Cup	India	1–0	Iran	Bhubaneswar, India
19:00 IST	Anju Tamang 48'	Report		Stadium: Kalinga Stadium; Referee: C. R. Srikrishna (India)

11 February 2019 Gold Cup	India	1–2	Nepal	Bhubaneswar, India
19:00 IST	Ratanbala Devi 84'	Report	Sabitra Bhandari 4', 6'	Stadium: Kalinga Stadium; Referee: G.Ruba Devi (India)

13 February 2019 Gold Cup	India	0–2	Myanmar	Bhubaneswar, India
19:00 IST		Report	July Kyaw 2'; Win Theingi Tun 90+4'	Stadium: Kalinga Stadium; Referee: C. R. Srikrishna (India)

27 February 2019 Turkish Women's Cup	India	0–1	Uzbekistan	Side, Turkey
15:30 (IST)		AIFF Report; AIFF; Report	Burkhanova 8'	Stadium: Evrenseki Stadium

1 March 2019 Turkish Women's Cup	Turkmenistan	0–10	India	Alanya, Turkey
15:30 (IST)		AIFF Report; AIFF; Report	Grace Dangmei 7'; Sanju Yadav 17', 37', 71'; Anju Tamang 51', 83'; Ranjana Chanu 60', 62'; Sumithra Kamaraj 77'; Indumathi 87'

3 March 2019 Turkish Women's Cup	Romania	3–0	India	Alanya, Turkey
19:30	Vătafu 15', 87'; Spânu 30'	AIFF Report; AIFF; FRF		Stadium: Gold city

5 March 2019 Turkish Women's Cup	India	0–0 (3–4 p)	Kazakhstan	Alanya, Turkey
14:30 (IST)		AIFF Report; AIFF; Report		Stadium: Gold city
	Penalties
	Ashalata Devi (penalty scored); Manisha (penalty missed); Dalima Chhibber (penalty scored); Grace Dangmei (penalty scored); Sanju Yadav (penalty missed)		Penalty missed Penalty scored

13 March 2019 SAFF W	India	6–0	Maldives	Biratnagar, Nepal
15:00 UTC+05:45	Grace Dangmei 8'; Sandhiya 13'; Indumathi Kathiresan 22'; Sanju Yadav 27', 89'; Ratanbala Devi 45+4'	AIFF		Stadium: Sahid Rangsala; Attendance: 1813; Referee: Ashmita Manandhar (Nepal)

17 March 2019 SAFF W	Sri Lanka	0–5	India	Biratnagar, Nepal
15:00 UTC+05:45		Report	Grace Dangmei 4'; Sandhiya Ranganathan 7'; Indumathi Kathiresan 36'; Sangita Basfore 45'; Ratanbala Devi 47'	Stadium: Sahid Rangsala; Attendance: 1,684; Referee: Mizanur Rahman (Bangladesh)

20 March 2019 SAFF W SF	India	4–0	Bangladesh	Biratnagar, Nepal
15:30 UTC+05:45	Dalima Chhibber 18'; Indumathi Kathiresan 22', 37'; Manisha Kalyan 90+3'	Report		Stadium: Sahid Rangsala; Attendance: 1,263; Referee: Mohommed Nizam (Sri Lanka)

22 March 2019 SAFF W FL	Nepal	1–3	India	Biratnagar, Nepal
15:00 UTC+05:45	Sabitra Bhandari 33'	Report	Dalima Chhibber 26'; Grace Dangmei 63'; Anju Tamang 78'	Stadium: Sahid Rangsala; Attendance: 10,000; Referee: Mohammed Manir Dhali (Bangladesh)

3 April 2019 2020 Olympic 2R Q	India	2–0	Indonesia	Mandalay, Myanmar
14:00 IST	Grace Dangmei 27', 68'	AFC AIFF		Stadium: Mandalarthiri Stadium; Attendance: 100; Referee: Kim Yu-jeong (South Korea)

6 April 2019 2020 Olympic 2R Q	Nepal	1–3	India	Mandalay, Myanmar
14:00 IST	Niru Thapa 7'	AFC AIFF	Punam Magar 6' (o.g.); Sandhiya Ranganathan 60'; Ashalata Devi 78' (pen.)	Stadium: Mandalarthiri Stadium; Attendance: 356; Referee: Law Bik Chi (Hong Kong)

9 April 2019 2020 Olympic 2R Q	Myanmar	3–3	India	Mandalay, Myanmar
14:30 IST	Win Tun 17', 21', 72'	AFC AIFF	Sandhiya Ranganathan 10'; Sanju 32'; Ratanbala 64'	Stadium: Mandalarthiri Stadium; Attendance: 851; Referee: Mahsa Ghorbani (Iran)

29 August 2019 Friendly	India	1–5	Uzbekistan	Tashkent, Uzbekistan
18:00 IST	Bala Devi 5'	AIFF Report; AIFF	Lyudmila Karachik 31'; Maftuna Shoyimova 38'; Nilufar Kudratova 49'; Diyorakhon Khabibullaeva 62'; Ugiloy Kuchkarova 82'	Stadium: Yakkasary Stadium

2 September 2019 Friendly	Uzbekistan	1–1	India	Tashkent, Uzbekistan
18:00 IST	Lyudmila Karachik 78' (pen.)	AIFF Report; AIFF	Sandhiya Ranganathan 52'	Stadium: Yakkasary Stadium

3 November 2019 Friendly	Vietnam	3–0	India	Hanoi, Vietnam
13:30 IST	Thị Nhung 16'; Thị Tuyết Dung 83'; Thị Thúy Hằng 90+1'	AIFF; Report		Stadium: Vietnam Youth Football Training Centre

6 November 2019 Friendly	India	1–1	Vietnam	Hanoi, Vietnam
13:35 IST	Ranjana Chanu 57'	Report	Thái Thị Thảo 39'	Stadium: Vietnam Youth Football Training Centre

3 December 2019 2019 S.A Games	India	5–0	Maldives	Pokhara, Nepal
13:35 IST	Grace 5'; B. Devi 24', 33'; Manisha Kalyan 87'; Jabamani Tudu 88'	Report		Stadium: Pokhara Rangasala; Attendance: 150; Referee: G.M Chowdhury Noyon (Bangladesh)

5 December 2019 2019 S.A Games	Sri Lanka	0–6	India	Pokhara, Nepal
13:35 IST		Report	Grace 7'; Sandhiya Ranganathan 10', 25'; Ratanbala Devi 18', 88'; Bala Devi 90+1'	Stadium: Pokhara Rangasala; Attendance: 150; Referee: Mohammed Jalaluddin (Bangladesh)

7 December 2019 2019 S.A Games	India	1–0	Nepal	Pokhara, Nepal
13:35 IST	Bala Devi 18'	Report		Stadium: Pokhara Rangasala; Attendance: 400

9 December 2019 2019 S.A Games	India	2–0	Nepal	Pokhara, Nepal
13:35 IST	B. Devi 18', 56'	AIFF; Report		Stadium: Pokhara Rangasala; Attendance: 10,000+ Referee: Mohammad Jalaluddin (Bangladesh)

== See also ==
- India women's national football team results (2000–2009)
- India women's national football team results (2020–present)
