= Bangladesh women's national football team results (2010–2019) =

This article provides details of international football games played by the Bangladesh women's national football team from 2010 to 2019.

== Results ==
Key
Win
Draw
Defeat

=== 2019 ===
20 March 2019 2019 SAFF Championship	Bangladesh	0–4	India	Biratnagar, Nepal
15:30 UTC+5:45		AIFF	Indumathi Kathiresan 22', 37'; Dalima Chhibber 18'; Manisha Panna 93+3'	Stadium: Sahid Rangsala

16 March 2019 2019 SAFF Championship	Bangladesh	0–3	Nepal	Biratnagar, Nepal
15:30 UTC+5:45		SAFF	Masura Parvin 6' (o.g.); Sabitra Bhandari 23'; Manjali Kumari Yonjan 28'	Stadium: Sahid Rangsala; Attendance: 4687

14 March 2019 2019 SAFF Championship	Bangladesh	2–0	Bhutan	Biratnagar, Nepal
15:30 UTC+5:45	Mishrat Jahan Moushumi 47'; Sabina Khatun 85'	Report		Stadium: Sahid Rangsala; Attendance: 2349; Referee: Ashish Chowdhury (India)

=== 2018 ===
13 November 2018 2020 Olympics Q	Bangladesh	1–1	Nepal	Yangon, Myanmar
15:30 BST	Akhi Khatun 90+3'	Report	Niru Thapa 17'	Stadium: Thuwunna Stadium; Attendance: 100; Referee: Lee Yi-chi (Chinese Taipei)

11 November 2018 2020 Olympics Q	Bangladesh	1–7	India	Yangon, Myanmar
14:30 BST	Krishna Rani Sarkar 81'	Report	Yumnam Kamala Devi 16' (pen.), 53'; Ngangom Bala Devi 22', 23', 62', 75'; Sanju Yadav 73'	Stadium: Thuwunna Stadium; Attendance: 100; Referee: Mi Siyu (China)

8 November 2018 2020 Olympics Q	Bangladesh	0–5	Myanmar	Yangon, Myanmar
18:00 BST		Report	Win Theingi Tun 34', 44'; Khin Moe Wai 61'; Le Le Hlaing 84'; Yee Yee Oo 89'	Stadium: Thuwunna Stadium; Attendance: 1381; Referee: Mahsa Ghorbani (Iran)

=== 2017 ===
17 February 2017 Friendly	Bangladesh	1–2	Malaysia	Jalan Besar, Singapore
				Stadium: Jalan Besar Stadium

16 February 2017 Friendly	Bangladesh	0–3	Singapore	Jalan Besar, Singapore
				Stadium: Jalan Besar Stadium

4 January 2017 2016 SAFF Championship	Bangladesh	1–3	India	Siliguri, India
	Sirat Jahan Shopna 40'	Report	Dangmei Grace 12'; Sasmita Malik 60'; Indumathi Kathiresan 67'	Stadium: Kanchenjunga Stadium

2 January 2017 2016 SAFF Championship	Bangladesh	6–0	Maldives	Siliguri, India
	Sirat Jahan Shopna 11', 22', 57'; Sabina Khatun 49', 59'; Nargis Khatun 52'	Report		Stadium: Kanchenjunga Stadium

=== 2016 ===
31 December 2016 2016 SAFF Championship	Bangladesh	0–0	India	Siliguri, India
		Report		Stadium: Kanchenjunga Stadium

29 December 2016 2016 SAFF Championship	Bangladesh	6–0	Afghanistan	Siliguri, India
	Sabina Khatun 6', 15', 40', 44', 48'; Sirat Jahan Shopna 85'	Report		Stadium: Kanchenjunga Stadium

13 February 2016 2016 South Asian Games	Bangladesh	1–5	India	Shillong, India
16:00	Sabina Khatun 65'	Report	Kamala Devi Yumnam 6', 37'; Ngangom Bala Devi 13', 75'; Sanju Yadav 74'	Stadium: Jawaharlal Nehru Stadium

9 February 2016 2016 South Asian Games	Bangladesh	2–0	Maldives	Shillong, India
	Marzia 48'; Sabina Khatun 73'			Stadium: Jawaharlal Nehru Stadium

7 February 2016 2016 South Asian Games	Bangladesh	2–1	Sri Lanka	Shillong, India
	Krishna Rani Sarkar 65', 83'		R Ekanayake 68'	Stadium: Jawaharlal Nehru Stadium

5 February 2016 2016 South Asian Games	Bangladesh	0–3	Nepal	Shillong, India
		Report	Dipa Adhikari 13'; Anu Lama 17'; Niru Thapa 90+2'	Stadium: Jawaharlal Nehru Stadium; Attendance: 1000

=== 2014 ===
19 November 2014 2014 SAFF Championship	Bangladesh	0–1	Nepal	Islamabad, Pakistan
14:30		Report	Sajana Rana 56' (pen.)	Stadium: Jinnah Sports Stadium

17 November 2014 2014 SAFF Championship	Bangladesh	3–1	Maldives	Islamabad, Pakistan
15:30	Maynum Rana 18'; Sabina Khatun 35', 87'	Report	Aishath Sama 81'	Stadium: Jinnah Sports Stadium

15 November 2014 2014 SAFF Championship	Bangladesh	1–5	India	Islamabad, Pakistan
15:30	Sabina Khatun 50'	Report	Thokchom Umapati Devi 46'; Moirangthem Mandakini Devi 48'; Ngangom Bala Devi 57', 86'; Indumathi Kathiresan 76'	Stadium: Jinnah Sports Stadium

13 November 2014 2014 SAFF Championship	Bangladesh	6–1	Afghanistan	Islamabad, Pakistan
15:30	Maynum Rana 34'; Krishna Rani Sarkar 36', 47', 69'; Sabina Khatun 62'; Musammat Mummun Ather 90+5'	Report	Marjan Haydaree 23'	Stadium: Jinnah Sports Stadium

=== 2013 ===
25 May 2013 2014 AFC Asian Cup qualification	Bangladesh	0–4	Philippines	Dhaka, Bangladesh
19:00		Report	Marisa Park 19', 90+5'; Christina delos Reyes 29'; Cat Barnekow 85'	Stadium: Bangabandhu National Stadium; Attendance: 700; Referee: Kate Jacewicz (Australia)

23 May 2013 2014 AFC Asian Cup qualification	Bangladesh	0–2	Iran	Dhaka, Bangladesh
19:00		Report	Maryam Rahimi 26', 51'	Stadium: Bangabandhu National Stadium; Attendance: 1,500; Referee: Thein Thein Aye (Myanmar)

21 May 2013 2014 AFC Asian Cup qualification	Bangladesh	0–9	Thailand	Dhaka, Bangladesh
19:00		Report	Rattikan Thongsombut 16'; Naphat Seesraum 18'; Nisa Romyen 29', 45', 87', 90+3'; Trishna Chakma 52' (o.g.); Sunisa Srangthaisong 64'; Boontan Anongnat 79'	Stadium: Bangabandhu National Stadium; Attendance: 3,000; Referee: Cong Thi Dung (Vietnam)

=== 2012 ===
11 September 2012 2012 SAFF Championship	Bangladesh	1–2	Sri Lanka	Colombo, Sri Lanka
15:30	Aungmraching Marma 75'	Report	Hasara Dilrangi 83'; Achala Chitrani 86'	Stadium: CR & FC Grounds

9 September 2012 2012 SAFF Championship	Bangladesh	1–0	Bhutan	Colombo, Sri Lanka
15:30	Suinu Pru Marma 19'	Report		Stadium: CR & FC Grounds

7 September 2012 2012 SAFF Championship	Bangladesh	0–3	India	Colombo, Sri Lanka
08:30		AIFF	Yumnam Kamala Devi 64'; Oinam Bembem Devi 76'; Alochana Senapati 89'	Stadium: CR & FC Grounds

=== 2011 ===
20 March 2011 2012 Olympics Q	Bangladesh	0–3	Uzbekistan	Dhaka, Bangladesh
16:30		Report	Aziza Ermatova 64'; Makhliyo Sarikova 74'; Lyudmila Karachik 89'	Stadium: Bangabandhu National Stadium; Attendance: 800; Referee: Mai Hoang Trang (Vietnam)

18 March 2011 2012 Olympics Q	Bangladesh	0–3	India	Dhaka, Bangladesh
16:30		Report	Ngangom Bala Devi 52', 70', 90+2'	Stadium: Bangabandhu National Stadium; Attendance: 1,000; Referee: Semaksuk Praew (Thailand)

=== 2010 ===
21 December 2010 2010 SAFF Championship	Bangladesh	0–3	Nepal	Cox's Bazar, Bangladesh
		Report	Jamuna Gurung 16', 76'; Anu Lama 71'	Stadium: Cox's Bazar Stadium

17 December 2010 2010 SAFF Championship	Bangladesh	0–6	India	Cox's Bazar, Bangladesh
		Report	Yumnam Kamala Devi (?); Sasmita Malik (?); Tababi Devi (?)	Stadium: Cox's Bazar Stadium

15 December 2010 2010 SAFF Championship	Bangladesh	9–0	Bhutan	Cox's Bazar, Bangladesh
	Aungmraching Marma 13', 16', 30'; Farhana Khatun 25', 80'; Sabina Khatun 34', 67'; Suinu Pru Marma 41', 52'	Report		Stadium: Cox's Bazar Stadium

13 December 2010 2010 SAFF Championship	Bangladesh	2–0	Sri Lanka	Cox's Bazar, Bangladesh
	Suinu Pru Marma 5'; Sabina Khatun 71'	Report		Stadium: Cox's Bazar Stadium

6 February 2010 2010 South Asian Games	Bangladesh	0–7	India	Dhaka, Bangladesh
		Report	Laishram Naobi Chanu (?)	Stadium: Bangabandhu National Stadium

2 February 2010 2010 South Asian Games	Bangladesh	1–0	Pakistan	Dhaka, Bangladesh
17:00	Sabina Khatun 15'			Stadium: Bangabandhu National Stadium

31 January 2010 2010 South Asian Games	Bangladesh	2–0	Sri Lanka	Dhaka, Bangladesh
17:00	Aungmraching Marma 7'; Suinu Pru Marma 8'	Report		Stadium: Bangabandhu National Stadium

29 January 2010 2010 South Asian Games	Bangladesh	0–1	Nepal	Dhaka, Bangladesh
15:30			Jamuna Gurung	Stadium: Bangabandhu National Stadium
