= Afghanistan women's national football team results =

Women's national football team

This page details the match results and statistics of the Afghanistan women's national football team.

Afghanistan women's national football team is the representative of Afghanistan in international women's association football. It is governed by the Afghanistan Football Federation (AFF) and competes as a member of the Asian Football Confederation (AFC).

The national team's first activity was in 2010 when they participated in the inaugural edition of the SAFF Women's Championship. The Afghans were drawn alongside Nepal, Pakistan and Maldives. They lost their first-ever match against Nepal (13–0) led to Afghanistan finishing last after losing the second match against Pakistan and drawing the Maldives in the last game. The team is currently unranked by FIFA after the team got inactive for more than 4 years. The team officially disbanded in August 2021 after the Taliban's takeover which caused the women's national football team players to flee to western countries in the hope to escape with their life. Some of the football players regrouped in Australia where the team came back to pitch unofficially.

== Record per opponent ==
Key

Positive balance (more wins than losses)
Neutral balance (as many wins as losses)
Negative balance (more losses than wins)

The following table shows Afghanistan' all-time official international record per opponent:

Opponent	Pld	W	D	L	GF	GA	GD	W%	Confederation
Bangladesh	2	0	0	2	1	12	−13	0	AFC
India	3	0	0	3	1	28	−27	0	AFC
Iran	1	0	0	1	0	6	−6	0	AFC
Jordan	2	0	0	2	0	11	−11	0	AFC
Kazakhstan	1	0	0	1	0	2	−2	0	UEFA
Kyrgyzstan	2	1	0	1	1	1	0	50	AFC
Maldives	3	0	2	1	3	4	−1	0	AFC
Nepal	2	0	0	2	1	20	−19	0	AFC
Pakistan	2	1	0	1	4	3	+1	50	AFC
Qatar	2	1	0	0	2	0	+2	100	AFC
Tajikistan	1	0	0	1	0	5	−5	0	AFC
Uzbekistan	1	0	0	1	0	20	−20	0	AFC
Total	21	3	2	16	13	112	−99	14.28	—

== Results ==
=== 2010 ===
14 December 2010 2010 SAFF Women's Championship Group B	Nepal	13–0	Afghanistan	Cox's Bazar, Bangladesh
13:30 UTC+6				Stadium: Cox's Bazar Stadium; Attendance: 1,641; Referee: Dulal Mridha (Bangladesh)

16 December 2010 2010 SAFF Women's Championship Group B	Pakistan	3–0	Afghanistan	Cox's Bazar, Bangladesh
12:30 UTC+6				Stadium: Cox's Bazar Stadium; Attendance: 841; Referee: Kazal Khan (Bangladesh)

18 December 2010 2010 SAFF Women's Championship Group B	Maldives	2–2	Afghanistan	Cox's Bazar, Bangladesh
10:30 UTC+6				Stadium: Cox's Bazar Stadium; Attendance: 1,231; Referee: Debashish Chhatopaddhaya (India)

=== 2012 ===
16 February 2012 Friendly	Qatar	0–2	Afghanistan	Doha, Qatar
--:-- UTC+3

8 September 2012 2012 SAFF Women's Championship Group B	Maldives	1–1	Afghanistan	Colombo, Sri Lanka
15:30 UTC+5:30	Afza 30'	Report	Naweed 2'	Stadium: CR & FC Grounds; Attendance: 4,873; Referee: Riaz Haque (Bangladesh)

10 September 2012 2012 SAFF Women's Championship Group B	Pakistan	0–4	Afghanistan	Colombo, Sri Lanka
15:30 UTC+5:30		Report	Rohin 8', 23'; Arghandiwal 51'; Haydaree 89'	Stadium: CR & FC Grounds; Attendance: 4,870; Referee: Deponkor Ghosh (India)

12 September 2012 2012 SAFF Women's Championship Group B	Nepal	7–1	Afghanistan	Colombo, Sri Lanka
8:30 UTC+5:30	Thapa 5', 45+2'; Gurung 19'; Rana 47', 72'; Lama 69', 89'	Report	Haydaree 42'	Stadium: CR & FC Grounds; Attendance: 1,241; Referee: Hasan Mir (Pakistan)

14 September 2012 2012 SAFF Women's Championship SF	India	11–0	Afghanistan	Colombo, Sri Lanka
8:30 UTC+5:30	K. Devi 5', 57', 90'; P. Devi 31'; B. Devi 40', 61', 70'; Malik 43', 78'; Devi 59'; Magar 81'	Report		Stadium: CR & FC Grounds; Attendance: 1,618; Referee: Nasiruddin Khan (Bangladesh)

=== 2013 ===
23 August 2013 Friendly	Kyrgyzstan	0–1	Afghanistan	Bishkek, Kyrgyzstan
--:-- UTC+6		Report	Sahar

25 August 2013 Friendly	Kazakhstan	2–0	Afghanistan	Bishkek, Kyrgyzstan
--:-- UTC+6		Report

=== 2014 ===
13 November 2014 2014 SAFF Women's Championship Group A	Bangladesh	6–1	Afghanistan	Islamabad, Pakistan
--:-- UTC+5	Rana 34'; Rani 36', 47', 69'; Khatun 62'; Ather 90+5'	Report	Haydaree 23'	Stadium: Jinnah Sports Stadium; Attendance: 5,000

15 November 2014 2014 SAFF Women's Championship Group A	Maldives	1–0	Afghanistan	Islamabad, Pakistan
--:-- UTC+5	Rifa 34'	Report		Stadium: Jinnah Sports Stadium; Attendance: 2,000

17 November 2014 2014 SAFF Women's Championship Group A	Afghanistan	0–12	India	Islamabad, Pakistan
--:-- UTC+5		Report	Kathiresan 3', 7', 51'; B. Devi 4', 12', 33', 39', 84'; P. Devi 29', 45+2', 69'; M. Devi 88'	Stadium: Jinnah Sports Stadium; Attendance: 2,000

=== 2016 ===
27 December 2016 2016 SAFF Women's Championship Group B	India	5–1	Afghanistan	Siliguri, India
16:30 UTC+5:30	Y. Devi 3', 32'; Malik 29'; Grace 45+2'; Yadav 90+2'	Report	Muhtaj 88'	Stadium: Kanchenjunga Stadium; Attendance: 20,411; Referee: Mizanur Rahman (Bangladesh)

29 December 2016 2016 SAFF Women's Championship Group B	Bangladesh	6–0	Afghanistan	Siliguri, India
16:30 UTC+5:30	Khatun 6', 15', 40', 44', 48'; Shopna 85'	Report		Stadium: Kanchenjunga Stadium; Attendance: 14,310; Referee: Ismail Khan (Maldives)

=== 2018 ===
2 February 2018 Friendly	Jordan	5–0	Afghanistan	Amman, Jordan
--:-- UTC+3				Stadium: Petra Stadium

5 February 2018 Friendly	Jordan	6–0	Afghanistan	Amman, Jordan
--:-- UTC+3				Stadium: Petra Stadium

23 November 2018 2018 CAFA Women's Championship	Uzbekistan	20–0	Afghanistan	Tashkent, Uzbekistan
16:00 UTC+5	Karachik 4', 19', 22'; Kudratova 5', 15', 68', 75'; Turdiboeva 31'; Khabibullaeva 36', 47', 49'; Burkhonova 37'; Safina 39'; Shoyimova 49'; Zoirova 51'; Nozimova 59', 76', 82', 88'; Jonimqulova 64' (pen.)	Report		Stadium: Milliy Stadium; Attendance: 90; Referee: Veronika Bernatskaya (Kyrgyzstan)

25 November 2018 2018 CAFA Women's Championship	Afghanistan	0–6	Iran	Tashkent, Uzbekistan
13:00 UTC+5		Report	Ghanbari 4', 21'; Shaban 9', 39'; Mahdumi 34'; Geraeli 49'	Stadium: Milliy Stadium; Attendance: 60; Referee: Khusnora Jumaeva (Uzbekistan)

27 November 2018 2018 CAFA Women's Championship	Kyrgyzstan	1–0	Afghanistan	Tashkent, Uzbekistan
16:00 UTC+5	Toktobolotova 19' (pen.)	Report		Stadium: Milliy Stadium; Attendance: 100; Referee: Sorour Saedi (Iran)

1 December 2018 2018 CAFA Women's Championship	Afghanistan	0–5	Tajikistan	Tashkent, Uzbekistan
16:00 UTC+5		Report	Fozilova 17', 59'; Jumakhon 45', 84'; Khamilova 69'	Stadium: Milliy Stadium; Attendance: 100; Referee: Veronika Bernatskaya (Kyrgyzstan)

=== 2021 ===
10 November 2021 Unofficial Friendly	Qatar	5–0	Afghanistan	Doha, Qatar
--:-- UTC+3		Report		Stadium: Khalifa International Stadium

=== 2022 ===
29 May 2022 Unofficial Friendly	Surrey	4–0	Afghanistan	Dorking, England
15:30 UTC+0	Curr 7'; Keen 57'; Azzi 79', 89'	Report		Stadium: Meadowbank Football Ground

=== 2025 ===
26 October 2025 FIFA Unites: Women's Series	Afghan Women United (Afghanistan)	1–6	Chad	Berrechid, Morocco
17:00 UTC+1	Noori 4' (pen.)		Djoïtana 44'; Abdoulaye 53'; Dallou 60', 73'; Larkingam 62', 81'	Stadium: Berrechid Municipal Stadium

29 October 2025 FIFA Unites: Women's Series	Tunisia	4–0	Afghan Women United	Berrechid, Morocco
20:00 UTC+1	Marzouki 7'; Mejri 11'; Abbassi 68'; Ammar 74'			Stadium: Berrechid Municipal Stadium

1 November 2025 FIFA Unites: Women's Series	Libya	0–7	Afghan Women United	Berrechid, Morocco
17:00 UTC+1			Ali 4', 12'; Amini 18' (pen.); N. Mohammadi 54'; Noori 64'; S. Mohammadi 70'; Haidari 83'	Stadium: Berrechid Municipal Stadium

=== 2026 ===
4 June 2026 Friendly	Cook Islands	1–0	(Afghanistan) Afghan Women United	Auckland, New Zealand
	(?) Teupoko Tuariki	Report

8 June 2026 Friendly	Cook Islands	3–0	(Afghanistan) Afghan Women United	Auckland, New Zealand
		Report

== See also ==
- Afghanistan national football team results
- Melbourne Victory FC AWT
- Women's football in Afghanistan
