= Sri Lanka women's national football team results =

- Win Draw Loss

This article lists the Sri Lanka women's national football team fixtures and results.

== 2010 ==
29 January SA Games	India	8–1	Sri Lanka	Bangabandhu Stadium, Dhaka

31 January SA Games	Bangladesh	2–0	Sri Lanka	Bangabandhu Stadium, Dhaka

2 February SA Games	Nepal	8–0	Sri Lanka	Bangabandhu Stadium, Dhaka

4 February SA Games	Pakistan	3–0 (awarded)	Sri Lanka	Bangabandhu Stadium, Dhaka

5 November Friendly	Sri Lanka	2–0	Maldives	Kalutara, Sri Lanka

7 November Friendly	Sri Lanka	3–0	Maldives	Baddagana, Sri Lanka

13 December SAFF Championship	Bangladesh	2–0	Sri Lanka	Cox’S Bazar, Bangladesh

15 December SAFF Championship	India	7–0	Sri Lanka	Cox’S Bazar, Bangladesh

17 December SAFF Championship	Sri Lanka	1–1	Bhutan	Cox’S Bazar, Bangladesh

== 2012 ==
7 September SAFF Championship	Bhutan	0–4	Sri Lanka	CR & FC Grounds
15:30 SLST		Report	Kumari 4'; Erandi 21', 57'; Praveena 84'

9 September SAFF Championship	India	5–0	Sri Lanka	CR & FC Grounds
8:30 SLST	Samal 17'; Salam 32', 51'; Magar 53'; Prameshowri 56'	Report

11 September SAFF Championship	Bangladesh	1–2	Sri Lanka	CR & FC Grounds
15:30 SLST	Marma 75'	Report	Hasara 83'; Achala 86'

14 September SAFF Championship	Nepal	3–0	Sri Lanka	CR & FC Grounds
15:30 SLST	Anu 48'; Dipa 76'; Laxmi 90+3' (pen.)	Report

== 2014 ==
11 November SAFF Championship	Pakistan	1–2	Sri Lanka	Jinnah Sports Stadium, Islamabad
	Hajra 90+1'	Report	Ishara 38'; Erandi 86'	Referee: Kalpana Sharma (Nepal)

14 November SAFF Championship	Sri Lanka	3–0	Bhutan	Jinnah Sports Stadium, Islamabad
	Achala 20'; Erandi 40'; Praveena 88'	Report

16 November SAFF Championship	Nepal	3–0	Sri Lanka	Jinnah Sports Stadium, Islamabad
	Niru 14'; Anu 53' (pen.), 84'	Report

19 November SAFF Championship	India	5–0	Sri Lanka	Jinnah Sports Stadium, Islamabad
	Indumati 23', 69'; Ngangom 31'; Prameshowri 48'; Yumnam 72'	Report

== 2015 ==
11 March 2016 Olympic Q.	Sri Lanka	0–16	Myanmar	Mandalarthiri Stadium, Mandalay
17:00		Report	Phew 2', 4', 40'; Khin 6', 16', 20', 21', 26'; Nisansala 18' (o.g.); Theingi 23', 28', 49', 77', 90+1'; Yee 48', 51'	Attendance: 5,456; Referee: Law Bik Chi (Hong Kong)

13 March 2016 Olympic Q.	India	4–0	Sri Lanka	Mandalarthiri Stadium, Mandalay
17:00	K. Devi 12'; A. Devi 16'; Withanage 48' (o.g.); R. Devi 58'	Report		Attendance: 839; Referee: Nami Imaizumi (Japan)

== 2016 ==
29 January Friendly	Singapore	0–1	Sri Lanka	Kallang, Singapore
19:30 SST (UTC+8)		Report	Perera 8'	Stadium: Jalan Besar Stadium

7 February SA Games	Sri Lanka	1–2	Bangladesh	Shillong, India
16:00	Ekanayake 68'		65', 83' Sarkar

9 February SA Games	India	5–0	Sri Lanka	Shillong, India
16:00	Hasara Dilrangi 24' (o.g.); Dangmei Grace 45+1', 58'; Yumnam Kamala Devi 60'; Sasmita Malik 73' (pen.)

11 February SA Games	Sri Lanka	1–2	Maldives	Shillong, India
16:00	Hasara Dilrangi 90+1'		6', 45' (pen.) Fadhuwa Zahir

13 February SA Games	Nepal	4–0	Sri Lanka	Shillong, India
11:00	A.S. Perera 13' (o.g.); Sabitra Bhandari 51', 63'; Sapana Lama 79'

26 December SAFF Championship	Sri Lanka	2–5	Maldives	Kanchenjunga Stadium, Siliguri
	Liyanage 43'; Kumudini 45+2'	Report	Rifa 24'; Zahir 27', 64', 80'; Shamila 88'

28 December SAFF Championship	Bhutan	0–2	Sri Lanka	Kanchenjunga Stadium, Siliguri
		Report	Liyanage 60'; Praveena 77'

30 December SAFF Championship	Nepal	1–0	Sri Lanka	Kanchenjunga Stadium, Siliguri
	Gunawardana 87' (o.g.)

== 2018 ==
17 December 2018 Friendly	Bahrain	5–0	Sri Lanka	Manama, Bahrain
15:00		Report		Stadium: Al Ahli Stadium

20 December 2018 Friendly	Bahrain	2–0	Sri Lanka	Manama, Bahrain
15:00				Stadium: Al Ahli Stadium

23 December 2018 Friendly	Bahrain	2–1	Sri Lanka	Manama, Bahrain
15:00		Report		Stadium: Al Ahli Stadium

== 2019 ==
15 March SAFF Championship	Maldives	0–2	Sri Lanka	Sahid Rangsala, Biratnagar
15:00		SAFF ANFA	Chalini 40', 50'	Attendance: 1,464; Referee: Dulal Mridha (Bangladesh)

17 March SAFF Championship	Sri Lanka	0–5	India	Sahid Rangsala, Biratnagar
15:00		SAFF AIFF	Grace 4'; Sandhiya 7'; Indumathi 36'; Sangita 45'; Ratanbala 47'	Attendance: 1,684; Referee: Mizanur Rahman (Bangladesh)

20 March SAFF Championship	Nepal	4–0	Sri Lanka	Sahid Rangsala, Biratnagar
11:00	Magar 42'; Anita 73'; Bhandari 82'; Rekha 86'	Report		Attendance: 4,112; Referee: Pratap Singh (India)

23 July Friendly	Bhutan	0–1	Sri Lanka	Thimphu, Bhutan
		Report	Praveena 90+1'	Stadium: Changlimithang Stadium

26 July Friendly	Bhutan	1–0	Sri Lanka	Thimphu, Bhutan
	Yangden 17' (pen.)	Report		Stadium: Changlimithang Stadium

3 December SA Games	Nepal	1−0	Sri Lanka	Pokhara Rangasala, Pokhara
10:00	Limbu 86'	Report		Attendance: 500

5 December SA Games	Sri Lanka	0−6	India	Pokhara Rangasala, Pokhara
10:00		Report	Grace 7'; Ranganathan 10', 25'; R. Devi 18', 88'; B. Devi 90+1'	Attendance: 150

7 December SA Games	Maldives	2−1	Sri Lanka	Pokhara Rangasala, Pokhara
10:00	S. Aminath 37'; F. Saina 54'	Report	C. Ekanayake 85'	Attendance: 200

== 2022 ==
9 September 2022 SAFF W GS	Sri Lanka	0–5	Bhutan	Kathmandu, Nepal
17:30		Report	Dema 42'; Lhazom 50', 64'; Lhaden 85'; Wangmo 89'	Stadium: Dashrath Stadium; Attendance: 172; Referee: Tekcham Ranjita Devi (India)

12 September 2022 SAFF W GS	Nepal	6–0	Sri Lanka	Kathmandu, Nepal
17:30	Rashmi 9'; Saru 11'; Amrita 17'; Dipa 45+3'; Amisha 73', 90+3'	Report		Stadium: Dashrath Stadium; Attendance: 2650; Referee: Jaya Chakma (Bangladesh)

== 2023 ==
April 2023 2024 AFC Olympic Qualifiers Round 1	Thailand	Cancelled	Sri Lanka
--:--

April 2023 2024 AFC Olympic Qualifiers Round 1	Sri Lanka	Cancelled	Mongolia
--:--

April 2023 2024 AFC Olympic Qualifiers Round 1	Singapore	Cancelled	Sri Lanka
--:--

== 2024 ==
18 October 2024 SAFF W GS	Sri Lanka	1–0	Maldives	Kathmandu, Nepal
17:30				Stadium: Dashrath Stadium

21 October 2024 SAFF W GS	Bhutan	4–1	Sri Lanka	Kathmandu, Nepal
				Stadium: Dashrath Stadium

24 October 2024 SAFF W GS	Nepal	6–0	Sri Lanka	Kathmandu, Nepal
17:30 UTC+5:45	Sabita Rana Magar 8'; Sabitra 11'; Rekha 13', 36'; Amisha Karki 47'; Rashmi Kumari Ghising 90+4'			Stadium: Dasharath Rangasala

== 2025 ==
5 April Friendly	Saudi Arabia	2–0	Sri Lanka	Khobar, Saudi Arabia
18:30 UTC+3	Mukhayzin 19' (pen.); Belal 30'	Report		Stadium: Prince Saud Bin Jalawi Stadium

29 June 2026 AFC Asian Cup qualification	Uzbekistan	10–0	Sri Lanka	Tashkent, Uzbekistan
20:00 UTC+5	Kudratova 3', 7', 52', 73'; Karachik 18', 20'; Khabibullaeva 31', 87', 88'; Shoyimova 68'	Report		Stadium: Milliy Stadium; Referee: Asaka Koizumi (Japan)

2 July 2026 AFC Asian Cup qualification	Sri Lanka	0–8	Nepal	Tashkent, Uzbekistan
17:00 UTC+5		Report	G. Rana 7', 55'; Bhandari 14', 36', 40'; Thokar 62'; Poudel 78'; P. Rana 89'	Stadium: Milliy Stadium, Tashkent; Referee: Wang Chieh (Chinese Taipei)

5 July 2026 AFC Asian Cup qualification	Laos	2–0	Sri Lanka	Tashkent, Uzbekistan
17:00 UTC+5	Anuradhini 72' (o.g.); Inthaphone 90+2'	Report		Stadium: Milliy Stadium; Referee: Park Se-jin (South Korea)

== 2026 ==
28 May 2026 2026 SAFF GS	Sri Lanka	0–4	Bhutan	Margao, Goa
16:30 SLST (UTC+5:30)		Report	Pema 27', 80', 83'; Lhazom 54'	Stadium: Jawaharlal Nehru Stadium; Attendance: 49; Referee: Anjana Rai (Nepal)

31 May 2026 2026 SAFF GS	Nepal	2–0	Sri Lanka	Margao, Goa
16:30 SLST (UTC+5:30)	Ghishing 45+3'; Nagarkote 62'	Report		Stadium: Jawaharlal Nehru Stadium; Attendance: 761; Referee: Ranjita Devi Tekcham (India)

7 June 2026 Friendly	Saudi Arabia	4–0	Sri Lanka	Bangkok, Thailand
19:00 UTC+7	Abdullah 24', 37'; Abu-Alsamh 26', 27'			Stadium: Windmill Football Club Stadium
