= 2012–13 in Indian football =

Season in Indian football

Football in India
- Season: 2012–13

Men's football
- I-League: Churchill Brothers
- I-League 2nd Div.: Rangdajied United
- Federation Cup: East Bengal

The 2012–13 season is the 125th competitive association football season in India.

== Promotion and relegation ==
Teams relegated from the I-League:

- Chirag United Club Kerala
- HAL

Teams promoted to the I-League:

- ONGC
- United Sikkim

== Men's national teams ==
=== Senior ===
==== Record ====
Competition	GP	W	D	L	GF	GA
2014 AFC Challenge Cup qualification	3	2	0	1	6	2
2012 Nehru Cup (Note: Matches against Cameroon do not count as they are not listed by FIFA.)	3	2	1	0	5	1
International Friendlies	2	0	0	2	2	6
Total	8	5	1	3	13	9

==== Goalscorer's ====
Player	2014 ACC Qualifiers	2012 Nehru Cup (Note: Matches against Cameroon do not count as they are not listed by FIFA.)	Friendlies	Total
Sunil Chhetri	2	3	0	5
Syed Nabi	0	1	1	2
Clifford Miranda	1	0	1	2
Jewel Raja	2	0	0	2
Anthony Pereira	0	1	0	1
Robin Singh	1	0	0	1

==== Fixtures & Results ====
===== 2014 AFC Challenge Cup qualification =====
Team	Pld	W	D	L	GF	GA	GD	Pts
Myanmar	3	2	1	0	7	1	+6	7
India	3	2	0	1	6	2	+4	6
Guam	3	1	0	2	3	9	−6	3
Chinese Taipei	3	0	1	2	2	6	−4	1

Source: RSSSF

2 March 2013 Match 1	India	2 – 1	Chinese Taipei	Yangon, Myanmar
	Raja 40'; Singh 90'	Report		Stadium: Thuwunna Stadium

4 March 2013 Match 2	India	4 – 0	Guam	Yangon, Myanmar
	Chhetri 49', 90+1'; Miranda 68'; Raja 79'	Report		Stadium: Thuwunna Stadium

6 March 2013 Match 3	Myanmar	1 – 0	India	Yangon, Myanmar
	Oo 75'	Report		Stadium: Thuwunna Stadium

===== 2012 Nehru Cup =====
22 August 2012 MD 1	India	2 – 1	Syria	Delhi, India
	Chhetri 45+2'; Pereira 82'	Report	Al Shbli 89'	Stadium: Jawaharlal Nehru Stadium

25 August 2012 MD2	India	3 – 0	Maldives	Delhi, India
	Chhetri 45+2', 70'; Nabi 54'	Report		Stadium: Jawaharlal Nehru Stadium

28 August 2012 MD 3	India	0 – 0	Nepal	Delhi, India
		Report		Stadium: Jawaharlal Nehru Stadium

31 August 2012 MD4	India	0 – 1	Cameroon B	Delhi, India
		Report	Bite 2'	Stadium: Jawaharlal Nehru Stadium

2 September 2012 Final	India	2 – 2 (PEN 5–4) (5–4 p)	Cameroon B	Delhi, India
	G. Singh 19'; Chhetri 78'	Report	Thierry 29'; Mpondo 54'	Stadium: Jawaharlal Nehru Stadium
	Penalties
	R. Singh (penalty scored); Chhetri (penalty scored); Franco (penalty scored); Hossain (penalty scored); Miranda (penalty scored)		(penalty scored) Tambe; (penalty scored) Baba; (penalty scored) Bebey; (penalty scored) Mpondo; (penalty missed) Makon

===== International Friendlies =====
16 October 2012 Friendly	Singapore	2 – 0	India	Choa Chu Kang, Singapore
	Amri 42'; Nawaz 49'	Report		Stadium: Choa Chu Kang Stadium

6 February 2013 Friendly	India	2 – 4	Palestine	Kochi, Kerala
	Miranda 17'; Nabi 39'	Report	Nu'man 30', 48', 65'; Saleh 46'	Stadium: Jawaharlal Nehru Stadium

==== FIFA and AFC Ranking ====
Month	FIFA Ranking	Change (FIFA)	AFC Ranking	Change (AFC)
August 2012	168	N/A	31	N/A
September 2012	169	▼1	32	▼1
October 2012	168	▲1	31	▲1
November 2012	169	▼1	32	▼1
December 2012	166	▲3	31	▲1
January 2013	166	–	30	▲1
February 2013	167	▼1	31	▼1
March 2013	143	▲24	22	▲9
April 2013	149	▼6	24	▼2
May 2013	150	▼1	25	▼1
Final	150	▲18	25	▲6

==== Tournaments ====
===== Senior =====
Tournament	Result
(India) 2012 Nehru Cup	Champions

=== Under-16 ===
==== 2012 AFC U-16 Championship ====
23 September 2012 Group	Uzbekistan	3 – 2	India	Tehran, Iran
15:00	Odilov 8'; Abdullaev 53' (pen.); Abdiganiyev 79'	Report	Rai 47', 71'	Stadium: Rah Ahan Stadium; Attendance: 100; Referee: Chaiya Mahapab (Thailand)

25 September 2012 Group	India	0 – 0	Syria	Tehran, Iran
15:00		Report		Stadium: Rah Ahan Stadium; Attendance: 150; Referee: Strebre Delovski (Australia)

27 September 2012 Group	China	2 – 2	India	Tehran, Iran
13:00	Wang Jinxian 21'; Zhang Yuning 33'	Report	Lalhlimpuia 19'; Mendes 90+4' (pen.)	Stadium: Rah Ahan Stadium; Attendance: 100; Referee: Naser Al Ghafari (Jordan)

== Women's national teams ==
=== Senior ===
==== Record ====
Competition	GP	W	D	L	GF	GA
2014 AFC Women's Asian Cup qualification	3	0	1	2	2	5
2012 SAFF Women's Championship	5	5	0	0	33	1
Friendlies	2	2	0	0	4	1
Total	10	7	1	2	39	7

==== Goalscorer's ====
Player	2014 AFC Women's Asian Cup qualification	2012 SAFF Women's Championship	Friendlies	Total
Yumnam Kamala Devi	0	7	1	8
Sasmita Malik	2	3	1	6
Pinky Bompal Magar	0	5	1	6
Oinam Bembem Devi	0	5	0	5
Irom Prameshwori Devi	0	4	1	5
Salam Rinaroy Devi	0	2	0	2
Supriya Routray	0	2	0	2
Alochana Senapati	0	1	0	1
Suprava Samal	0	1	0	1
Tuli Goon	0	1	0	1
Nameirakpam Montesori Chanu	0	1	0	1
Ashem Romi Devi	0	1	0	1

==== Fixtures & Results ====
===== 2014 AFC Women's Asian Cup qualification =====
Pos	Team	Pld	W	D	L	GF	GA	GD	Pts	Qualification
1	Myanmar	3	2	1	0	11	0	+11	7	2014 AFC Women's Asian Cup
2	Chinese Taipei	3	2	1	0	8	1	+7	7	
3	India	3	0	1	2	2	5	−3	1	
4	Palestine (H)	3	0	1	2	1	16	−15	1	

Source: AFC
(H) Hosts

21 May 2013 MD1	India	0 – 2	Myanmar	Al-Ram, Palestine
		Report	Phaw 6'; Wai 26'	Stadium: Faisal Al-Husseini International Stadium

23 May 2013 MD2	India	1 – 2	Chinese Taipei	Al-Ram, Palestine
	Malik 54'	Report	Hsiu-chin 42'; Li-chin 82'	Stadium: Faisal Al-Husseini International Stadium

25 May 2013 MD3	India	1 – 1	Palestine	Al-Ram, Palestine
	Malik 35'	Report	Caro 46' (pen.)	Stadium: Faisal Al-Husseini International Stadium

===== 2012 SAFF Women's Championship =====
7 September 2012 MD1	India	3 – 0	Bangladesh	Columbo, Sri Lanka
	Y. Devi 64'; O. Devi 76'; Senapati 89'	Report		Stadium: CR & FC Grounds

9 September 2012 MD2	India	5 – 0	Sri Lanka	Columbo, Sri Lanka
	Samal 17'; Salam 32', 51'; Magar 53'; P. Devi 56'	Report		Stadium: CR & FC Grounds

11 September 2012 MD3	India	11 – 0	Bhutan	Columbo, Sri Lanka
	Tuli Goon 13'; Kamala Devi 23', 30'; Sasmita Malik 27' (pen.); Pinky Magar 38', 49', 65'; Parmeshwori Devi 42', 64'; Montesori Chanu 63'; Supriya Routray 73'	Report		Stadium: CR & FC Grounds

14 September 2012 Semis	India	11 – 0	Afghanistan	Columbo, Sri Lanka
	Kamala Devi 5', 57', 90'; Parmeshwori Devi 31'; Bembem Devi 40', 61', 70'; Sasmita Malik 43', 78'; Romi Devi 59'; Pinky Magar 81'	Report		Stadium: CR & FC Grounds

16 September 2012 Final	India	3 – 1	Nepal	Columbo, Sri Lanka
	Routray 8'; O. Devi 66'; K. Devi 83'	Report	Adhikari 3'	Stadium: CR & FC Grounds

===== Friendlies =====
14 May 2013 Friendly	Bahrain	1 – 2	India	Riffa, Bahrain
	Yusif 42'	Report	Magar 8'; Malik 36'	Stadium: Bahrain National Stadium

16 May 2013 Friendly	Bahrain	0 – 2	India	Riffa, Bahrain
		Report	P. Devi 56'; K. Devi 71'	Stadium: Bahrain National Stadium

==== FIFA and AFC Ranking ====
Month	FIFA Ranking	Change (FIFA)	AFC Ranking	Change (AFC)
August 2012	52	N/A	11	N/A
March 2013	51	▲1	10	▲1

==== Tournaments ====
===== Senior =====
Tournament	Result
(Sri Lanka) 2012 SAFF Women's Championship	Champions

== I-League ==
Pos	Team	Pld	W	D	L	GF	GA	GD	Pts	Qualification or relegation
1	Churchill Brothers (C)	26	16	7	3	56	22	+34	55	Qualification for 2014 AFC Cup group stage
2	Pune	26	16	4	6	53	26	+27	52	Qualification for 2014 AFC Champions League qualifying play-off (Note: Pune were chosen to represent India in the AFC Champions League as they passed the club licensing requirements.)
3	East Bengal	26	13	8	5	44	18	+26	47	
4	Prayag United	26	13	5	8	55	35	+20	44	
5	Dempo	26	11	7	8	45	33	+12	40	
6	Sporting Goa	26	9	8	9	36	41	−5	35	
7	Salgaocar	26	9	6	11	34	29	+5	33	
8	Mumbai	26	8	8	10	36	42	−6	32	
9	ONGC (R)	26	7	10	9	30	40	−10	31	Excluded (Note: ONGC and Air India were expelled from I-League because they failed to meet Asian Football Confederation's licensing criteria.)
10	Mohun Bagan	26	11	8	7	40	34	+6	29 (Note: On 29 December 2012, Mohun Bagan failed to turn up in the second half of the match against East Bengal due to crowd trouble; their record was expunged, with their remaining fixtures scratched, and they were banned from the I-League for until 2015 by the I-League core committee. On 15 January 2013, Mohun Bagan appealed the decision to ban them from the league and were reinstated, but would start on 0 points.)	
11	Shillong Lajong	26	6	10	10	26	40	−14	28	
12	Pailan Arrows	26	6	5	15	25	45	−20	23	
13	Air India (R)	26	4	7	15	28	63	−35	19	Excluded
14	United Sikkim (R)	26	2	9	15	23	63	−40	15	Relegation to 2014 I-League 2nd Division

Source: IndiaFooty.com
Rules for classification: 1) points; 2) goal difference; 3) number of goals scored.
(C) Champions; (R) Relegated

== Federation Cup ==
30 September 2012
18:30 IST

East Bengal	3 – 2 (a.e.t.)	Dempo
Mondal 60'; Singh 100'; Edeh 109'	Report	Lawrence 51'; Gawli 111'

Kanchenjunga Stadium, Siliguri
Attendance: 35,000 (est)
Referee: Vishnu Chawhan (Gujarat)

== Durand Cup ==
1 September 2012
18:30 IST

Air India	0 – 0 (a.e.t.)	Dodsal
	Report
Penalties
Mohanraj (penalty scored); Shetty (penalty scored); Meher (penalty missed); Chaudhari (penalty missed); R. Singh (penalty scored)	3–2	(penalty missed) Pradeep; (penalty scored) Kumar; (penalty scored) Diakhate; (penalty missed) Ghosh; (penalty missed) Rafi

Ambedkar Stadium, Delhi
Attendance: 10,000

== Santosh Trophy ==
3 March 2013

Kerala	0 – 0 (a.e.t.)	Services
	Report
Penalties
Anto (penalty scored); Basid (penalty scored); Sarath (penalty scored)	3 – 4	(penalty scored) Singh; (penalty scored) Kumar; (penalty scored) Dileep; (penalty scored) Varghese

Jawaharlal Nehru Stadium, Kochi, Kerala
Attendance: 35,000
