= 2020–21 Oakland Roots SC season =

American soccer club season

Oakland Roots SC
2020–21 NISA season
- Chairman: Steven Aldrich
- Head coach: Jordan Ferrell
- Stadium: Laney College; Oakland, CA
- NISA: Fall, Western Conf.: 1st
- Playoffs: Fall: Fall Championship Final
- Top goalscorer: League: Matthew Fondy: 2 All: Matthew Fondy: 5
- Biggest win: OAK 3–0 NAFC (Sep. 21, Fall Playoffs)
- Biggest defeat: OAK 1–2 DCFC (Sep. 23, Fall Playoffs); OAK 1–2 DCFC (Oct. 2, Fall Championship)

The 2020–21 Oakland Roots SC season was the club's second in the National Independent Soccer Association (NISA) and second overall.

On September 15, 2020, Oakland announced that it would be joining the second division USL Championship in 2021. The Roots became the fourth NISA team to cease league play during an on-going season and second to-do so in order to join the USLC after Miami FC made the same jump one year prior.

== Roster ==
=== Players ===
As of September 6, 2020

No.	Position	Nation	Player
1	GK	USA	Christian Herrera
2	DF	USA	Daniel Navarro
5	DF	CAN	Nana Attakora (Captain)
06	FW	USA	Matthew Fondy
8	MF	USA	Angel Heredia
9	FW	USA	Jack McInerney
10	MF	ESA	Nelson Blanco
11	FW	USA	Tristan Bowen
12	MF	USA	Peter Pearson
16	MF	IRL	Niall Irwin
19	FW	USA	Josiah Romero
22	MF	MEX	Diego Casillas (on loan from Reno 1868 FC)
27	FW	MEX	Julio Cervantes
32	MF	COL	Manny González
33	DF	USA	Robert Hines II
44	MF	COD	Ariel Mbumba
47	GK	USA	Taylor Bailey
49	DF	USA	Tarn Weir
50	DF	USA	David Abidor
61	FW	USA	Johnny Rodriguez
88	DF	KOR	Seo-In Kim
90	GK	USA	Kevin Gonzalez
91	MF	ERI	Yohannes Harish
98	MF	USA	Jonathan Orozco

=== Staff ===
- (United States) Jordan Ferrell – Head coach
- (Croatia) Dario Pot – Assistant coach
- (United States) Kristopher Hall – Assistant coach
- (Japan) Yuta Tanaka – Strength and conditioning coach

== Transfers ==
=== In ===
No.	Pos.	Player	Transferred from	Fee/notes	Date	Source
88	MF	(South Korea) Seo-In Kim	(Czech Republic) SK Zápy	Free transfer	July 31, 2020	
10	MF	(El Salvador) Nelson Blanco	(United States) San Diego 1904 FC	Free transfer	August 6, 2020	
22	MF	(Mexico) Diego Casillas	(United States) Reno 1868 FC	Loan for Fall season	September 3, 2020	
61	FW	(United States) Johnny Rodriguez	(United States) Cal State Northridge Matadors	Free transfer	September 3, 2020	
1	GK	(Mexico) Christian Herrera	(United States) Tacoma Defiance	End of loan		

=== Out ===
No.	Pos.	Player	Transferred to	Fee/notes	Date	Source
24	DF	(United States) Nikolai Littleton	Unattached	Retired	July 14, 2020	
3	DF	(Liberia) Wilfred Williams	(United States) Chattanooga FC	Free transfer	August 31, 2020	
4	DF	(Liberia) Doueugui Mala	Unattached	Not re-signed		
13	DF	(Italy) Francesco Tiozzo	(Italy) Adriese	Free transfer	September 4, 2020	
15	MF	(Senegal) Khadim Seye	Unattached	Not re-signed		
17	MF	(Colombia) David Ochoa	Unattached	Not re-signed		
22	FW	(United States) Alex Garuba	Unattached	Not re-signed		
5	DF	(Canada) Nana Attakora	Unattached	Retired	November 17, 2020	
22	MF	(Mexico) Diego Casillas	(United States) Reno 1868 FC	End of loan	November 30, 2020	

== Justice Match ==
On July 30, 2020, Oakland announced it would be hosting and broadcasting a special event prior to the regular season start called the "Justice Match" on August 29. The scrimmage featured Roots players mixed into two teams with retired local women's professional players and local women's soccer ambassadors that both played and coached, including former USWNT player Aly Wagner, Miranda Nild of the Thailand women's national football team, and former Afghanistan captain Hailai Arghandiwal.

The event was postponed on August 26 due to unhealthy air quality from the 2020 California wildfires. It was later rescheduled for October 10.

October 10, 2020	Team Dania	4–4	Team Nana	Walnut Creek, California
3:10 p.m. PDT	Mbumba 34', 48'; McInerney 51'; Heredia 60+1'	Report; Broadcast	Peterson 18'; Mbumba 26' (o.g.); Gradijan 37'; Navarro 55'	Stadium: COPA Soccer Training Center; Attendance: 0
Note: Game was played behind closed doors because of the COVID-19 pandemic, composed of two 30-minute halves, 8v8 indoor format

== Competitions ==
=== NISA Fall Season ===
On June 4, NISA announced details for the 2020 Fall Season. The eight member teams would be split into conferences, Eastern and Western, with the Roots playing in the later.

The Fall regular season schedule was announced on July 31, 2020. The team is set to play two regular season games, both on the road, against the rest of the Western Conference.

==== Standings ====
Pos	Team	Pld	W	D	L	GF	GA	GD	Pts
1	Oakland Roots SC	2	1	1	0	3	1	+2	4
2	California United Strikers FC	2	0	2	0	1	1	0	2
3	Los Angeles Force	2	0	1	1	0	2	−2	1

Source: NISAofficial.com

==== Results summary ====
Overall								Home						Away					
Pld	W	D	L	GF	GA	GD	Pts	W	D	L	GF	GA	GD	W	D	L	GF	GA	GD
2	1	1	0	3	1	+2	4	0	0	0	0	0	0	1	1	0	3	1	+2

Last updated: September 13, 2020.
Source: Match reports

==== Matches ====
September 6, 2020 Week 1	Los Angeles Force	0–2	Oakland Roots SC	Irvine, California
5:00 p.m. PDT	España (yellow card) 58'; Gordillo (yellow card) 71'; Hale (yellow card) 89'	Report; Broadcast	Fondy 15', 18'; McInerney (yellow card) 36'	Stadium: Championship Soccer Stadium; Attendance: 0 Referee: Omeed Azadpour
Note: Game was played behind closed doors due to the COVID-19 pandemic

September 13, 2020 Week 2	California United Strikers FC	1–1	Oakland Roots SC	Irvine, California
4:00 p.m. PDT	Thierjung 3'; Lopez (yellow card) 29'; Coronado (yellow card) 61'; Klute (yellow card) 68'; Bowers (yellow card) 77'; Nuno (yellow card) 90+4'	NISA Report; Cal United Report; FotMob Report; Broadcast	Abidor (yellow card) 78'; McInerney 90' (pen.)	Stadium: Championship Soccer Stadium; Attendance: 0 Referee: Karen Callado
Note: Game was played behind closed doors due to the COVID-19 pandemic

=== Fall Playoffs ===
All eight NISA teams qualified for the 2020 Fall tournament, which will be hosted at Keyworth Stadium in Detroit, Michigan, beginning on September 21 ending with the final on October 2.

==== Group stage ====
Pos	Team	Pld	W	D	L	GF	GA	GD	Pts	Qualification
1	Oakland Roots SC	3	2	0	1	5	2	+3	6	Advance to semifinals
2	Detroit City FC	3	2	0	1	6	5	+1	6	Advance to semifinals
3	Michigan Stars FC	3	1	1	1	4	3	+1	4	
4	New Amsterdam FC	3	0	1	2	4	9	−5	1	

Source: NISAofficial.com
Rules for classification: 1) Points, 2) Goal differential, 3) Goals scored, 4) Head-to-head record, 5) Coin toss

September 21, 2020 Group stage	Oakland Roots SC	3–0	New Amsterdam FC	Hamtramck, Michigan
8:00 p.m. EDT	Fondy 32'; Blanco (yellow card) 52', (goal) 76'; Casillas (yellow card) 55'; McInerney 65'	NISA Report; FotMob Report; Broadcast	Yorston (yellow card) 45+2'; Bello (yellow card) 45+2'; Vicente (yellow card) 67'; Nadaner (yellow card) 69'	Stadium: Keyworth Stadium; Attendance: 0 Referee: Samuel Pizzimenti
Note: Game was played behind closed doors due to the COVID-19 pandemic

September 24, 2020 Group stage	Oakland Roots SC	1–2	Detroit City FC	Hamtramck, Michigan
5:00 p.m. EDT	Mbumba (yellow card) 39'; Fondy 45'	NISA Report; FotMob Report; Broadcast	Kafari (yellow card) 36'; Matthews 54'; Filerman (yellow card) 64'; Lawson 80'	Stadium: Keyworth Stadium; Attendance: 0 Referee: Jacob Little
Note: Game was played behind closed doors due to the COVID-19 pandemic

September 27, 2020 Group stage	Oakland Roots SC	1–0	Michigan Stars FC	Hamtramck, Michigan
5:00 p.m. EDT	Kim 3'; Abidor (yellow card) 59'	NISA Report; FotMob Report; Broadcast	Mkuruva (yellow card) 90+5'	Stadium: Keyworth Stadium; Attendance: 0 Referee: Carter Brochu
Note: Game was played behind closed doors due to the COVID-19 pandemic

==== Knockout stage ====
September 30, 2020 Semifinal	Oakland Roots SC	3–2	Chattanooga FC	Hamtramck, Michigan
5:00 p.m. EDT	Rodriguez 6'; Heredia 19'; Pearson (yellow card) 31'; Fondy 48'; Irwin (yellow card) 85'; McInerney (yellow card) 90+4'	NISA Report; FotMob Report; Broadcast	McGrath 46'; Marcano 77'; Russell (yellow card) 90+4'	Stadium: Keyworth Stadium; Attendance: 0 Referee: Samuel Pizzimenti
Note: Game was played behind closed doors due to the COVID-19 pandemic

October 2, 2020 Fall Championship	Oakland Roots SC	1–2	Detroit City FC	Hamtramck, Michigan
6:00 p.m. EDT	Rodriguez 26'; Harish (yellow card) 54'; Navarro (yellow card) 77'; Wier (yellow card) 80'; Irwin (yellow card) 90'	NISA Report; FotMob Report; Broadcast	Saydee (yellow card) 16'; Lawson 65'; Peterson 85'	Stadium: Keyworth Stadium; Attendance: 0 Referee: Nicole Green
Note: Game was played behind closed doors due to the COVID-19 pandemic

== Squad statistics ==
As of Match played October 2, 2020

=== Appearances and goals ===
No.	Pos	Nat	Player	Total		Fall Season		Fall Playoffs	
No.	Pos	Nat	Player	Apps	Goals	Apps	Goals	Apps	Goals
Goalkeepers
1	GK	(United States) USA	Christian Herrera	7	0	2+0	0	5+0	0
47	GK	(United States) USA	Taylor Bailey	0	0	0+0	0	0+0	0
90	GK	(United States) USA	Kevin Gonzalez	0	0	0+0	0	0+0	0
Defenders
2	DF	(United States) USA	Daniel Navarro	4	0	0+0	0	2+2	0
5	DF	(Canada) CAN	Nana Attakora	5	0	2+0	0	3+0	0
33	DF	(United States) USA	Robert Hines II	4	0	2+0	0	2+0	0
49	DF	(United States) USA	Tarn Weir	7	0	2+0	0	5+0	0
50	DF	(United States) USA	David Abidor	7	0	2+0	0	5+0	0
Midfielders
8	MF	(United States) USA	Angel Heredia	5	1	0+0	0	2+3	1
10	MF	(El Salvador) ESA	Nelson Blanco	7	1	0+2	0	1+4	1
12	MF	(United States) USA	Peter Pearson	7	0	2+0	0	4+1	0
16	MF	(Republic of Ireland) IRL	Niall Irwin	3	0	0+0	0	2+1	0
22	MF	(Mexico) MEX	Diego Casillas	6	0	2+0	0	4+0	0
32	MF	(Colombia) COL	Manny González	6	0	2+0	0	1+3	0
44	MF	(Democratic Republic of the Congo) COD	Ariel Mbumba	7	0	0+2	0	5+0	0
88	MF	(South Korea) KOR	Seo-In Kim	2	1	0+1	0	1+0	1
91	MF	(Eritrea) ERI	Yohannes Harish	6	0	2+0	0	4+0	0
98	MF	(United States) USA	Jonathan Orozco	2	0	0+2	0	0+0	0
Forwards
06	FW	(United States) USA	Matthew Fondy	7	5	2+0	2	4+1	3
9	FW	(United States) USA	Jack McInerney	7	2	2+0	1	2+3	1
11	FW	(United States) USA	Tristan Bowen	0	0	0+0	0	0+0	0
19	FW	(United States) USA	Josiah Romero	0	0	0+0	0	0+0	0
27	FW	(Mexico) MEX	Julio Cervantes	0	0	0+0	0	0+0	0
61	FW	(United States) USA	Johnny Rodriguez	6	2	0+2	0	3+1	2

=== Goal scorers ===
Place	Position	Nation	Number	Name	Fall Season	Fall Playoffs	Total
1	FW	(United States)	06	Matthew Fondy	2	3	5
2	FW	(United States)	9	Jack McInerney	1	1	2
2	FW	(United States)	61	Johnny Rodriguez	0	2	2
3	MF	(United States)	8	Angel Heredia	0	1	1
3	MF	(El Salvador)	10	Nelson Blanco	0	1	1
3	MF	(South Korea)	88	Seo-In Kim	0	1	1

=== Disciplinary record ===
Number	Nation	Position	Name	Fall Season		Fall Playoff		Total	
Number	Nation	Position	Name	Booked	Sent off (straight red)	Booked	Sent off (straight red)	Booked	Sent off (straight red)
2	(United States)	DF	Daniel Navarro	0	0	1	0	1	0
9	(United States)	FW	Jack McInerney	1	0	1	0	2	0
10	(El Salvador)	MF	Nelson Blanco	0	0	1	0	1	0
12	(United States)	MF	Peter Pearson	0	0	1	0	1	0
16	(Republic of Ireland)	MF	Niall Irwin	0	0	2	0	2	0
22	(Mexico)	MF	Diego Casillas	0	0	1	0	1	0
44	(Democratic Republic of the Congo)	MF	Ariel Mbumba	0	0	1	0	1	0
49	(United States)	DF	Tarn Weir	0	0	1	0	1	0
50	(United States)	DF	David Abidor	1	0	1	0	2	0
91	(Eritrea)	MF	Yohannes Harish	0	0	1	0	1	0
