= List of England national rugby union team test series =

Before 1963, the English rugby team never had a test series and in 1963 they played in a two test series. So here is a list of test series involving the England rugby union team.

== 1963 Series – New Zealand ==
Test	Score	Date	Venue
First Test	11–21	25 May	Eden Park, Auckland
Second Test	6–9	1 June	Lancaster Park, Christchurch

== 1971 Series – Japan ==
Test	Score	Date	Venue
First Test	27–19	24 September	Higashiosaka Hanazono Rugby Stadium, Osaka
Second Test	6–3	28 September	Chichibunomiya Rugby Stadium, Tokyo

== 1971 Series – Ceylon ==
Test	Score	Date	Venue
First Test	40–11	6 October	Longden Place, Colombo
Second Test	34–6	8 October	Longden Place, Colombo

== 1975 Series – Australia ==
Test	Score	Date	Venue
First Test	9–16	24 May	Sydney Cricket Ground, Sydney
Second Test	21–30	31 May	Ballymore, Brisbane

== 1979 Series – Japan ==
Test	Score	Date	Venue
First Test	21–19	13 May	Higashiosaka Hanazono Rugby Stadium, Osaka
Second Test	38–18	20 May	Olympic Stadium, Tokyo

== 1981 Series – Argentina ==
Test	Score	Date	Venue
First Test	19–19	30 May	Estadio Arquitecto Ricardo Etcheverry, Buenos Aires
Second Test	12–6	6 June	Estadio Arquitecto Ricardo Etcheverry, Buenos Aires

== 1984 Series – South Africa ==
Test	Score	Date	Venue
First Test	15–33	2 June	Boet Erasmus Stadium, Port Elizabeth
Second Test	9–35	9 June	Ellis Park, Johannesburg

== 1985 Series – New Zealand ==
Test	Score	Date	Venue
First Test	13–18	1 June	Lancaster Park, Christchurch
Second Test	15–42	8 June	Athletic Park, Wellington

== 1988 Series – Australia ==
Test	Score	Date	Venue
First Test	16–22	29 May	Ballymore, Brisbane
Second Test	8–28	12 June	Concord Oval, Sydney

== 1990 Series – Argentina ==
Test	Score	Date	Venue
First Test	25–12	28 June	José Amalfitani Stadium, Buenos Aires
Second Test	13–15	4 August	José Amalfitani Stadium, Buenos Aires

== 1993 Series – Canada ==
Test	Score	Date	Venue
First Test	12–15	29 May	Swangard Stadium, Burnaby
Second Test	19–14	5 June	Twin Elm Rugby Park, Nepean

== 1994 Series – South Africa ==
Test	Score	Date	Venue
First Test	32–15	4 June	Loftus Versfeld, Pretoria
Second Test	9–27	11 June	Newlands, Cape Town

== 1997 Series – Argentina ==
Test	Score	Date	Venue
First Test	42–20	31 May	Estadio Arquitecto Ricardo Etcheverry, Buenos Aires
Second Test	13–33	7 June	Estadio Arquitecto Ricardo Etcheverry, Buenos Aires

== 1997 Series – New Zealand ==
Test	Score	Date	Venue
First Test	8–25	22 November	Old Trafford, Manchester
Second Test	26–26	6 December	Twickenham, London

== 1998 Series – New Zealand ==
Test	Score	Date	Venue
First Test	22–64	20 June	Carisbrook, Dunedin
Second Test	10–40	27 June	Eden Park, Auckland

== 2000 Series – South Africa ==
Test	Score	Date	Venue
First Test	13–18	17 June	Loftus Versfeld, Pretoria
Second Test	27–22	24 June	Free State Stadium, Bloemfontein

== 2001 Series – Canada ==
Test	Score	Date	Venue
First Test	22–10	2 June	Fletcher's Fields, Markham
Second Test	59–20	9 June	Swangard Stadium, Burnaby

== 2003 Series – France ==
Test	Score	Date	Venue
First Test	16–17	30 August	Stade Vélodrome, Marseille
Second Test	45–14	6 September	Twickenham, London

== 2004 Series – New Zealand ==
Test	Score	Date	Venue
First Test	3–36	12 June	Carisbrook, Dunedin
Second Test	12–36	19 June	Eden Park, Auckland

== 2006 Series – Australia ==
Test	Score	Date	Venue
First Test	3–34	11 June	Stadium Australia, Sydney
Second Test	18–43	17 June	Colonial Stadium, Melbourne

== 2006 Series – South Africa ==
Test	Score	Date	Venue
First Test	23–21	18 November	Twickenham, London
Second Test	14–25	25 November	Twickenham, London

== 2007 Series – South Africa ==
Test	Score	Date	Venue
First Test	10–58	26 May	Free State Stadium, Bloemfontein
Second Test	22–55	2 June	Loftus Versfeld, Pretoria

== 2007 Series – France ==
Test	Score	Date	Venue
First Test	15–21	11 August	Twickenham, London
Second Test	9–22	18 August	Stade Vélodrome, Marseille

== 2008 Series – New Zealand ==
Test	Score	Date	Venue
First Test	20–37	14 June	Eden Park, Auckland
Second Test	12–44	21 June	Lancaster Park, Christchurch

== 2009 Series – Argentina ==
Test	Score	Date	Venue
First Test	37–15	6 June	Old Trafford, Manchester
Second Test	22–24	13 June	Estadio Padre Ernesto Martearena, Salta

== 2010 Series – Australia ==
Test	Score	Date	Venue
First Test	17–27	12 June	Subiaco Oval, Perth
Second Test	21–20	19 June	Stadium Australia, Sydney

== 2011 Series – Wales ==
Test	Score	Date	Venue
First Test	23–19	6 August	Twickenham, London
Second Test	9–19	13 August	Millennium Stadium, Cardiff

== 2012 Series – South Africa ==
Test	Score	Date	Venue
First Test	17–22	9 June	Kings Park Stadium, Durban
Second Test	27–36	16 June	Ellis Park, Johannesburg
Third Test	14–14	23 June	Nelson Mandela Bay Stadium, Port Elizabeth

== 2013 Series – Argentina ==
Test	Score	Date	Venue
First Test	32–3	9 June	Estadio Padre Ernesto Martearena, Salta
Second Test	51–26	16 June	José Amalfitani Stadium, Buenos Aires

== 2014 Series – New Zealand ==
Test	Score	Date	Venue
First Test	15–20	7 June	Eden Park, Auckland
Second Test	27–28	14 June	Forsyth Barr Stadium, Dunedin
Third Test	13–36	21 June	Waikato Stadium, Hamilton

== 2015 Series – France ==
Test	Score	Date	Venue
First Test	19–14	15 August	Twickenham, London
Second Test	20–25	22 August	Stade de France, Paris

== 2016 Series – Australia ==
Test	Score	Date	Venue
First Test	39–28	11 June	Lang Park, Brisbane
Second Test	23–7	18 June	Melbourne Rectangular Stadium, Melbourne
Third Test	44–40	25 June	Sydney Football Stadium, Sydney

== 2017 Series – Argentina ==
Test	Score	Date	Venue
First Test	38–34	10 June	Estadio San Juan del Bicentenario, San Juan
Second Test	35–25	17 June	Estadio Brigadier General Estanislao López, Santa Fe

== 2018 Series – South Africa ==
Test	Score	Date	Venue
First Test	–	9 June	Ellis Park, Johannesburg
Second Test	–	16 June	Free State Stadium, Bloemfontein
Third Test	–	23 June	Newlands, Cape Town

== Test Series Scores ==
=== Touring Test Series ===
Year	Home	Score	Away	Points	Venue	Note
1963	New Zealand	2–0	England	30–17	New Zealand	
1971	Japan	0–2	England	22–33	Japan	
1971	Ceylon	0–2	England	13–74	Ceylon	
1975	Australia	2–0	England	46–30	Australia	
1979	Japan	0–2	England	37–59	Japan	
1981	Argentina	0–1	England	25–31	Argentina	1 Draw
1984	South Africa	2–0	England	68–24	South Africa	
1985	New Zealand	2–0	England	60–28	New Zealand	
1988	Australia	2–0	England	50–24	Australia	
1990	Argentina	1–1	England	21–38	Argentina	
1993	Canada	1–1	England	29–31	Canada	
1994	South Africa	1–1	England	41–40	South Africa	
1997	Argentina	1–1	England	53–55	Argentina	
1998	New Zealand	2–0	England	104—32	New Zealand	
2000	South Africa	1–1	England	40–40	South Africa	
2001	Canada	0–2	England	30–81	Canada	
2004	New Zealand	2–0	England	74–15	New Zealand	
2006	Australia	2–0	England	77–21	Australia	
2007	South Africa	2–0	England	113–32	South Africa	
2008	New Zealand	2–0	England	81–32	New Zealand	
2010	Australia	1–1	England	47–38	Australia	
2012	South Africa	2–0	England	72–58	South Africa	1 Draw
2013	Argentina	0–2	England	29–83	Argentina	
2014	New Zealand	3–0	England	84–55	New Zealand	
2016	Australia	0–3	England	75–106	Australia	
2017	Argentina	0–2	England	59–73	Argentina	

=== Home Test Series ===
Year	Team	Score	Points	Note
1997	New Zealand	0–1	34–51	1 Draw
2006	South Africa	1–1	37–46	

=== Home and Away Test Series ===
Year	Home	Score	Away	Points	Venue	Note
2003	England 1 - 1 France	61 - 31	France and England			
2007	England 0 - 2 France	24 - 43	England and France			

2009 Argentina First Test 37–15 6 June Old Trafford, Manchester Second Test 22–24 13 June Estadio Padre Ernesto Martearena, Salta

2011 Wales First Test 23–19 6 August Twickenham, London Second Test 9–19 13 August Millennium Stadium, Cardiff

2015 France First Test 19–14 15 August Twickenham, London Second Test 20–25 22 August Stade de France, Paris
