= Supriya Routray =

Indian footballer (born 1990)

Personal information
- Date of birth: 12 June 1990 (age 36)
- Place of birth: Cuttack, Odisha, India
- Position: Midfielder

Team information
- Current team: Nita FA
- Number: 42

Senior career*
Years	Team	Apps	(Gls)
- Odisha
2017–2018	Rising Students		
2019–2021	Gokulam Kerala	2	(0)
2022	Sports Odisha	10	(3)
2022–2023	East Coast Railway		
2023–2025	Kickstart		
2026–	Nita FA		

International career
2010–2016	India	?	(2)
- * Club domestic league appearances and goals as of 26 January 2020

Supriya Routray (born 12 June 1990) is an Indian professional footballer who plays as a midfielder for Nita FA in the Indian Women's League. She represented the India national football team.

== Career ==
She was part of the Indian squad at the 2012 SAFF Women's Championship and the 2015–16 AFC Women's Olympic Qualifying Tournament.

She played for Rising Students Club and Gokulam Kerala in the Indian Women's League.

== International goals ==
Scores and results list India's goal tally first.

No.	Date	Venue	Opponent	Score	Result	Competition
1.	11 September 2012	CR & FC Grounds, Colombo, Sri Lanka	Bhutan	11–0	11–0	2012 SAFF Women's Championship
2.	16 September 2012	CR & FC Grounds, Colombo, Sri Lanka	Nepal	1–1	3–1	2012 SAFF Women's Championship

== Honours ==
India

- SAFF Women's Championship: 2010, 2012, and 2014
- South Asian Games Gold medal– 2016

Rising Students Club

- Indian Women's League: 2017–18

Gokulam Kerala

- Indian Women's League: 2019–20

Odisha

- Rajmata Jijabai Trophy: 2010–11
- National Games Silver medal: 2022

Railways

- Rajmata Jijabai Trophy: 2015–16
