= Aungmraching Marma =

Bangladeshi footballer

Personal information
- Full name: Aungmraching Marma
- Date of birth: 25 January 1990 (age 36)
- Place of birth: Khagrachari, Chittagong, Bangladesh
- Height: 1.60 m (5 ft 3 in)
- Positions: Forward; midfielder

Senior career*
Years	Team	Apps	(Gls)
2011	Sheikh Jamal Dhanmondi		
2013	Dhaka Abahani Women	5	(29)

International career^{‡}
2009–2015	Bangladesh	19	(5)
Medal record
Women's football
Representing Bangladesh
South Asian Games
Bronze medal – third place	2010	Bangladesh
- * Club domestic league appearances and goals as of 9 December 2020 ‡ National team caps and goals as of 20 March 2019

Aungmraching Marma (Bengali: অংম্রাচিং মারমা) is a Bangladeshi women footballer who plays as a forward and also can play as a midfielder. She played for Bangladesh women's national football team. She was also the captain of Bangladesh women's national football team.

== Early years ==
Aungmraching Marma was born in 1990 in Khagrachari, Chittagong.

== International career ==
In 2009, Aungmraching Marma made her debut in the Bangladesh national team. She had been the national team captain.

== International goals ==
No.	Date	Venue	Opponent	Score	Result	Competition
1	31 January 2010	Bangabandhu National Stadium, Dhaka, Bangladesh	Sri Lanka	1–0	2–0	2010 South Asian Games
2	15 December 2010	Cox's Bazar Stadium, Cox's Bazar, Bangladesh	Bhutan	1–0	9–0	2010 SAFF Championship
3	15 December 2010	Cox's Bazar Stadium, Cox's Bazar, Bangladesh	Bhutan	2–0	9–0	2010 SAFF Championship
4	15 December 2010	Cox's Bazar Stadium, Cox's Bazar, Bangladesh	Bhutan	4–0	9–0	2010 SAFF Championship
5	11 September 2012	CR & FC Grounds, Colombo, Sri Lanka	Sri Lanka	1–0	1–2	2012 SAFF Championship

== Honours ==
=== International ===
Bangladesh

- South Asian Games

Bronze medal: 2010

=== Club ===
Sheikh Jamal Dhanmondi Women

- Bangladesh Women's Football League
  - Winners (1): 2011

Dhaka Abahani Women

- Bangladesh Women's Football League
  - Winners (1): 2013
