= Sajana Rana =

Nepalese women's footballer (born 1987)

Personal information
- Full name: Sajana Rana
- Date of birth: 13 June 1987 (age 39)
- Place of birth: Waling, Syangja, Nepal
- Height: 5 ft 3 in (1.60 m)
- Position: Midfielder

Senior career*
Years	Team	Apps	(Gls)
–2015	APF Club		
2015	New Radiant (futsal)		

International career
- Nepal U-23
2010–	Nepal	8	(8)
- * Club domestic league appearances and goals

Sajana Rana (born 13 June 1987) is a Nepalese women's international footballer.

== Club career ==
In 2013 Rana won the most valuable player award at the 15th edition of the women's Ncell Cup. As a prize she was gifted one Yamaha scooter. In 2015 it was announced that Rana would be moving to Maldives to play futsal for New Radiant. In doing so Rana becomes the first ever Nepali women's player abroad. In the second game for her new club, Rana scored twice to book her team's place in the regional tournaments quarter final.

== International career ==
Rana made her debut for Nepal in the 2010 SAFF Women's Championship. In a friendly match against Kuwait Rana scored in the very first minute in what ended up being a historic 8–0 victory for Nepal. Rana came into the 2012 SAFF Women's Championship caring a significant knee injury sustained in 14th edition of the women's Ncell Cup, yet she still managed to score three goals during the tournament, in an 8–0 win over Pakistan and scored twice in a 7–1 win over Afghanistan.

Coming into the 2014 SAFF Women's Championship, Nepal was missing Jamuna Gurung and it was Rana's job to support star striker Anu Lama. Rana herself scored two goals in another 8–0 victory over Bhutan, as well as the second goal in the form of a penalty kick in a 2–0 win over Pakistan. In the semi-finals against Bangladesh Rana scored yet another spot-kick in the last group match. The tournament would end bitterly for Nepal as they once again lost to India in the final by a 6-0 scoreline.
