= Hailai Arghandiwal =

American association football player (born 1996)

Personal information
- Full name: Hailai Arghandiwal
- Date of birth: 22 April 1996 (age 30)
- Place of birth: Alameda, California, United States
- Height: 5 ft 5 in (1.65 m)
- Position: Midfielder

Youth career
- 2009–2011: Livermore Fusion SC
- 2011–2014: Pleasanton Rage SC

College career
Years	Team	Apps	(Gls)
2014–2017	Santa Clara Broncos	66	(0)

Senior career*
Years	Team	Apps	(Gls)
2018–2019	Florentia	1	(0)
2019–2020	MSV Duisburg	6	(0)

International career^{‡}
2010–	Afghanistan		
- * Club domestic league appearances and goals as of 09:31, 18 November 2021 (UTC) ‡ National team caps and goals as of 16:20, 1 March 2020 (UTC)

Hailai Arghandiwal (Pashto: هیلی ارغندیوال; born 22 April 1996) is a professional soccer player who plays as a midfielder. Born in the United States, she represented the Afghanistan national team.

== Club career ==
Arghandiwal agreed a transfer to Italian Serie A club Florentia in December 2018. She became an MSV Duisburg player in 2019.

== International career ==
In 2010, as a 14-year-old high school pupil from Alameda, California, Arghandiwal was selected for the Afghanistan national team at the 2010 SAFF Women's Championship in Bangladesh. Her experiences at the tournament inspired her to become a campaigner for women's rights in Afghanistan. She was the national team captain at the 2012 SAFF Women's Championship in Sri Lanka.

She played in the Oakland Roots' Justice Match on 10 October 2020.

== International goals ==
No.	Date	Venue	Opponent	Score	Result	Competition
1.	10 September 2012	CR & FC Grounds, Colombo, Sri Lanka	Pakistan	3–0	4–0	2012 SAFF Women's Championship
