= Suprava Samal =

Indian footballer

Personal information
- Date of birth: 16 June 1990 (age 36)
- Place of birth: Aali, Kendrapara, Odisha, India
- Position: Defender

Senior career*
Years	Team	Apps	(Gls)
- Sports Hostel Bhubaneswar
- Odisha
2017–2018	Rising Students		

International career
2010–2014	India	5	(1)
- * Club domestic league appearances and goals

Suprava Samal (born 16 June 1990) is an Indian footballer who played as a defender for the Rising Students Club and the India women's national football team.

== Career ==
Samal represented India at the 2010 SAFF Women's Championship and 2012 SAFF Women's Championship. She was part of the team at the Pre-Olympic Qualifiers in 2011. She played for the Combined Dutch Team in 2013.

== International goals ==
Scores and results list India's goal tally first.

No.	Date	Venue	Opponent	Score	Result	Competition
1.	9 September 2012	CR & FC Grounds, Colombo, Sri Lanka	Sri Lanka	1–0	5–0	2012 SAFF Women's Championship

== Honours ==
India

- SAFF Championship: 2010, 2012, 2014

Rising Students Club

- Indian Women's League: 2017–18

Orissa

- Rajmata Jijabai Trophy: 2010–11

Railways

- Rajmata Jijabai Trophy: 2015–16
