= Montesori Chanu Nameirakpam =

Indian footballer

Montesori Chanu
Personal information
- Full name: Montesori Chanu Nameirakpam
- Date of birth: 1 February 1992 (age 34)
- Place of birth: Leikai, Manipur, India
- Position: Midfielder

International career^{‡}
Years	Team	Apps	(Gls)
2011	India	1	(0)
- ‡ National team caps and goals as of 21 November 2014

Montesori Chanu Nameirakpam (Meitei: Nameirakpam Montesori Chanu, born 1 February 1992) is an Indian footballer who plays as a midfielder. She has been a member of the India women's national team.

== Honours ==
India

- SAFF Championship: 2012, 2014
