= Jyoti Ann Burrett =

Indian footballer

Jyoti Burrett
Personal information
- Full name: Jyoti Ann Burrett
- Date of birth: 18 September 1989 (age 37)
- Place of birth: Delhi, India
- Height: 5 ft 3 in (1.60 m)
- Position: Midfielder

College career
Years	Team	Apps	(Gls)
2014	University of Exeter Ladies		

Senior career*
Years	Team	Apps	(Gls)
- Duplicate Club
2016–2017	Pune City		
2017–2018	India Rush SC		
2018–2019	Hans Capital FC	5	(1)
2019–2020	Kickstart	2	(0)
2021–2022	Hans Capital FC	11	(3)
- Celtic Queens FC
2022–2023	Signature FC		
2023–2024	Royal Rangers		

International career
2014	India	?	(1)
- * Club domestic league appearances and goals

Jyoti Ann Burrett (born 18 September 1989) is an Indian professional footballer who plays for the FD Women's League club Royal Rangers. She started her career with Delhi state team, and has played for Kickstart and Hans Capital in the Indian Women's League.

== Early life ==
Born in Delhi, she studied in Welham Girls' School in Dehradun and Delhi's St. Stephen's College, and also has a master's degree in sports and health science from University of Exeter, UK.

== Career ==
She started her football career by playing for Jaguar Eves, a Club in Delhi. Around the same time, Burrett was selected to be a part of the 23-member squad for the AFC Women's Asian Cup (qualifiers) in 2014 as a forward. She also played for her university team while pursuing her Masters in University of Exeter, UK.

Currently the India women's senior national team striker, she also trained with Tottenham Hotspur during their pre-season camp in June to July in 2012. She was featured in the viral Nike's Da-da-ding video released in 2016 to promote women athletes in India.

Burrett and a few other women players started and registered Delhi Women's Football Players Welfare Association in 2017. This initiative is being supported by Bharatiya Janata Party's National Spokesperson Meenakshi Lekhi, and she has promised the team access a ground in Sarojini Nagar.

She joined Indian Women's League side Hans Football Club for the year 2019. She scored first goal against FC Alakhpura on 7 May 2019.

== Honours ==
India

- SAFF Women's Championship: 2014

== See also ==
- List of Indian football players in foreign leagues
