= Pinky Bompal Magar =

Indian footballer (born 1986)

Pinky Magar
Personal information
- Full name: Pinky Bompal Magar
- Date of birth: 18 April 1986 (age 40)
- Place of birth: Jharsuguda, Odisha
- Position: Forward

Senior career*
Years	Team	Apps	(Gls)
- Odisha
- Railways
2016–2017	Rising Students		

International career
2005–2013	India	?	(12)
- * Club domestic league appearances and goals

Pinky Bompal Magar is an Indian former footballer who played as a forward. She was elected as a member of the technical committee of the All India Football Federation in September 2022.

== Career ==
Magar was born in Jharsuguda in Odisha to parents Ram Bahadur Bompal Magar and Purnima Devi. She represented Odisha and Railways football teams in Rajmata Jijabai Trophy.

Magar made her debut for India at the 2006 AFC Women's Asian Cup qualification against Guam and scored her first goal in the match. She represented India at the 2008 AFC Women's Asian Cup qualification and the 2012 Olympics Qualifiers. She was a part of the national winning squads which played in the 2010 and 2012 SAFF Women's Championships. In the 2012 SAFF Women's Championship edition, she scored a hat-trick against Bhutan.

== International goals ==
No.	Date	Venue	Opponent	Score	Result	Competition
1.	12 June 2006	Mỹ Đình National Stadium, Hanoi, Vietnam	Guam	4–0	10–0	2006 AFC Women's Asian Cup qualification
2.	29 January 2010	Bangabandhu National Stadium, Dhaka, Bangladesh	Sri Lanka	8–?	8–1	2010 South Asian Games
3.	13 December 2010	Cox's Bazar Stadium, Cox's Bazar, Bangladesh	Bhutan	?–0	18–0	2010 SAFF Women's Championship
4.	15 December 2010	Cox's Bazar Stadium, Cox's Bazar, Bangladesh	Sri Lanka	6–0	7–0	2010 SAFF Women's Championship
5.	15 December 2010	Cox's Bazar Stadium, Cox's Bazar, Bangladesh	Sri Lanka	7–0	7–0	2010 SAFF Women's Championship
6.	23 September 2011	Bahrain National Stadium, Manama, Bahrain	Bahrain	1–0	3–1	Friendly
7.	9 September 2012	CR & FC Grounds, Colombo, Sri Lanka	Sri Lanka	4–0	5–0	2012 SAFF Women's Championship
8.	11 September 2012	CR & FC Grounds, Colombo, Sri Lanka	Bhutan	5–0	11–0	2012 SAFF Women's Championship
9.	11 September 2012	CR & FC Grounds, Colombo, Sri Lanka	Bhutan	7–0	11–0	2012 SAFF Women's Championship
10.	11 September 2012	CR & FC Grounds, Colombo, Sri Lanka	Bhutan	10–0	11–0	2012 SAFF Women's Championship
11.	14 September 2012	CR & FC Grounds, Colombo, Sri Lanka	Afghanistan	10–0	11–0	2012 SAFF Women's Championship
12.	13 May 2013	Bahrain National Stadium, Manama, Bahrain	Bahrain	1–0	2–1	Friendly

== Honours ==
India

- SAFF Championship: 2010, 2012
- South Asian Games Gold medal: 2010

Orissa / Odisha

- Rajmata Jijabai Trophy: 2010–11, runner-up: 2007–08, 2009–10
- National Games Silver medal: 2015

Railways

- Rajmata Jijabai Trophy: 2015–16
