= Marjan Haydaree =

US-born Afghan soccer player (born 1998)

Personal information
- Date of birth: July 22, 1998 (age 28)
- Place of birth: Concord, California, United States
- Position: Forward

Youth career
- 2013–2017: Clayton Valley Charter

College career
Years	Team	Apps	(Gls)
2017–2019	Diablo Valley College	39	(36)
2019	San Jose State Spartans		

International career
2012–2018	Afghanistan		(5)

Marjan Haydaree (Dari: مرجان حیدری; born 22 July 1998) is a soccer player who most recently played for the American club San Jose State Spartans. Born in the United States, she represented the Afghanistan national team and is their all-time top scorer with four goals as of 2016. She has played college soccer for Diablo Valley College and San Jose State Spartans.

== Personal life ==
Haydaree was born in Concord, California, United States. Her parents are both from Afghanistan, and emigrated to the US in 1982 and 1991. She attended Clayton Valley Charter High School. Haydaree has never been to Afghanistan.

== Club career ==
Haydaree plays as a forward. while at Clayton Valley Charter High School, she made 20 appearances for their soccer team, scoring 23 goals. She was an all-league player in her junior year.

Between 2017 and 2019, she played college soccer for Diablo Valley College. In the 2017–18 season, she made 19 appearances and scored 8 goals. In the 2018–19 season, she made 20 appearances and scored 28 goals. At one point in the season, Haydaree was the league's second top scorer, and she was named in the 2018 CCCSCA All Region team.

In 2019, she signed with the San Jose State Spartans women's college soccer team, with two more years of college soccer eligibility.

== International career ==
In 2012, Haydaree made her debut for the Afghanistan national team in an exhibition game against Qatar. She was aged 13, making her the youngest member of the squad, and she scored on her debut as Afghanistan won 2–0. It was Afghanistan first ever international win.

Haydaree has played international games in Sri Lanka, Pakistan, Japan, India and Uzbekistan. At the 2012 SAFF Women's Championship, Haydaree scored goals in Afghanistan's matches against Nepal and Pakistan. At the 2014 SAFF Women's Championship, she scored in Afghanistan's match against Bangladesh. As of 2016, Haydaree was Afghanistan's top scorer with four goals.

== International goals ==
No.	Date	Venue	Opponent	Score	Result	Competition
1.	16 February 2012	Aspire Zone, Doha, Qatar	Qatar	1–0	2–0	Friendly
2.	16 February 2012	Aspire Zone, Doha, Qatar	Qatar	2–0	2–0	Friendly
3.	10 September 2012	CR & FC Grounds, Colombo, Sri Lanka	Pakistan	4–0	4–0	2012 SAFF Women's Championship
4.	12 September 2012	CR & FC Grounds, Colombo, Sri Lanka	Nepal	1–2	1–7	2012 SAFF Women's Championship
5.	13 November 2014	Jinnah Sports Stadium, Islamabad, Pakistan	Bangladesh	1–0	1–6	2014 SAFF Women's Championship
