= Peter Pearson (footballer) =

Saint Lucian footballer

Personal information
- Full name: Peter Zachary Pearson
- Date of birth: December 17, 1995 (age 30)
- Place of birth: Virginia Beach, Virginia, United States
- Height: 5 ft 7 in (1.70 m)
- Position: Midfielder

Team information
- Current team: Des Moines Menace

Youth career
- –2014: Beach FC

College career
Years	Team	Apps	(Gls)
2014–2016	Virginia Cavaliers	4	(0)
2017–2018	VCU Rams	36	(5)

Senior career*
Years	Team	Apps	(Gls)
2016	Fresno Fuego	10	(1)
2017	Chattanooga FC	10	(0)
2018	Des Moines Menace	14	(1)
2019	South Georgia Tormenta	1	(0)
2020	Oakland Roots	12	(0)
2021	North Carolina FC	24	(2)
2022	Greenville Triumph	14	(0)
2023	TuS Ennepetal	11	(0)
2024	Des Moines Menace	9	(0)
2025-	Duluth FC	6	(1)

International career^{‡}
2022–	Saint Lucia	7	(1)
- * Club domestic league appearances and goals as of July 8, 2024 ‡ National team caps and goals as of March 25, 2026

Peter Zachary Pearson (born December 17, 1995) is a footballer who currently plays as a midfielder for USL League Two club Des Moines Menace. Born in the United States, he plays for the Saint Lucia national team.

== Club career ==
Pearson signed his first professional contract in January 2019 with USL League One side South Georgia Tormenta FC. His only appearance with the team came in the First Round of the 2019 U.S. Open Cup, where Tormenta lost 1–0 to Greenville Triumph SC.

In January 2020, Pearson joined Oakland Roots SC of the National Independent Soccer Association.

Pearson signed with USL League One side North Carolina FC on February 17, 2021.

On January 28, 2022, Pearson signed with Greenville Triumph along with Jimmy Filerman. Following the 2022 season, his contract option was declined by Greenville.

== International career ==
Born in the United States, Pearson is of Saint Lucian descent. He was called up to the Saint Lucia national team for a set of friendlies in May 2022, making his debut in a 3–2 loss to Guyana.

== Career statistics ==
=== Club ===
As of October 2, 2020.

Club	Season	League			Playoffs		National Cup (Note: Appearances in the U.S. Open Cup)		Continental		Total	
Club	Season	Division	Apps	Goals	Apps	Goals	Apps	Goals	Apps	Goals	Apps	Goals
Fresno Fuego	2016	PDL	10	1	0	0	0	0	0	0	10	1
Chattanooga FC	2017	NPSL	10	0	0	0	0	0	0	0	10	0
Des Moines Menace	2018	PDL	14	1	0	0	0	0	0	0	14	1
Tormenta FC	2019	USL League One	0	0	0	0	1	0	0	0	1	0
Oakland Roots SC	2019–20	NISA	2	0	0	0	0	0	0	0	2	0
Oakland Roots SC	2020–21	NISA	2	0	4	0	0	0	0	0	6	0
Oakland Roots SC	Total		4	0	4	0	0	0	0	0	8	0
Career total			38	2	4	0	1	0	0	0	33	2

=== International ===
As of match played 18 November 2024

Appearances and goals by national team and year
National team	Year	Apps	Goals
Saint Lucia	2022	2	0
Saint Lucia	2023	1	0
Saint Lucia	2024	4	1
Total		7	1

Scores and results list Saint Lucia's goal tally first, score column indicates score after each Pearson goal.

List of international goals scored by Peter Pearson
No.	Date	Venue	Opponent	Score	Result	Competition	Ref.
1	11 June 2024	Wildey Turf, Wildey, Barbados	Aruba	2–2	2–2	2026 FIFA World Cup qualification	
