= Kalpana Sharma (referee) =

Nepalese football referee

Kalpana Sharma (Nepali: कल्पना शर्मा is a Nepalese football referee.

== Early life ==
Sharma started playing football at the age of twelve. She is a native of Makwanpur District, Nepal.

== Career ==
Sharma was the first Nepalese female football referee.

== Personal life ==
Sharma has two sisters.
