= Suinu Pru Marma =

Bangladeshi footballer

Personal information
- Place of birth: Bangladesh
- Position: Midfielder

International career
Years	Team	Apps	(Gls)
2005–2014	Bangladesh		

Suinu Pru Marma (Bengali: সুইনু প্রু মারমা) is a Bangladeshi former footballer who played as a midfielder.

== Early life ==
She aspired to be a teacher as a child. She has a younger sister.

== Career ==
She was a Bangladesh international. She captained the Bangladesh women's national football team.

== Personal life ==
She has been married. She is a native of Rangamati, Bangladesh.
