= Romi Devi Ashem =

Indian footballer

Romi Devi
Personal information
- Full name: Romi Devi Ashem
- Date of birth: 10 February 1989 (age 37)
- Place of birth: Imphal, Manipur, India
- Position: Defender

Team information
- Current team: Manipur Police
- Number: 3

Senior career*
Years	Team	Apps	(Gls)
- Eastern Sporting Union
- Manipur Police

International career^{‡}
2010–2014	India		
- * Club domestic league appearances and goals ‡ National team caps and goals as of 25 May 2013

Romi Devi Ashem (Meitei: Ashem Romi Devi, born 10 February 1989) is an Indian footballer who plays as a defender for Manipur Police Sports Club. She has been a member of the India women's national team.

== Honours ==
India

- SAFF Women's Championship: 2010, 2012, 2014

Manipur

- Rajmata Jijabai Trophy: 2021–22
