= Alochana Senapati =

Indian footballer

Personal information
- Full name: Alochana Senapati
- Date of birth: 13 June 1989 (age 37)
- Place of birth: Aali, Kendrapara, Odisha
- Position: Defender

Senior career*
Years	Team	Apps	(Gls)
- Sports Hostel Bhubaneswar
- Odisha

International career
2005	India U17		
2006–2007	India U19		
2007–2012	India	?	(1)
- * Club domestic league appearances and goals

Alochana Senapati (born 13 June 1989) is an Indian former footballer who played as a defender.

== Career ==
Senapati was born in Aali in the Kendrapara district in Odisha. She represented the Sports Hostel Bhubaneswar in state and club tournaments and Odisha women's football team.

Senapati represented India at the 2008 AFC Women's Asian Cup qualification and the 2012 Olympics Qualifiers. She was also a part of the national winning squads which played in the 2010 and 2012 SAFF Women's Championships.

== International goals ==
Scores and results list India's goal tally first.

No.	Date	Venue	Opponent	Score	Result	Competition
1.	7 September 2012	CR & FC Grounds, Colombo, Sri Lanka	Bangladesh	3–0	3–0	2012 SAFF Women's Championship

== Honours ==
India

- SAFF Championship: 2010, 2012

Orissa

- Rajmata Jijabai Trophy: 2010–11, runner-up: 2007–08
- National Games Gold medal: 2007
