= Tuli Goon =

Indian footballer

Personal information
- Date of birth: 21 February 1988 (age 38)
- Place of birth: Kolkata, West Bengal, India
- Position: Right back

International career
Years	Team	Apps	(Gls)
2010–2013	India	8	(1)

Tuli Goon (born 21 February 1988 in Kolkata) is an Indian former footballer who played as a right back for India women's national football team.

== International ==
Goon has represented Indian Senior National Team in the 2010 South Asian Games in Bangladesh, 2010 SAFF Women's Championship and 2012 SAFF Women's Championship. She was also part of the Indian Team which played the Combined Dutch Team in 2013.

== Honours ==
India

- SAFF Championship: 2010, 2012
- South Asian Games Gold medal: 2010
