= Anu Lama =

Nepalese women's footballer (born 1987)

Personal information
- Full name: Anu Lama
- Date of birth: 3 October 1987 (age 39)
- Place of birth: Makwanpur, Nepal
- Height: 4 ft 10 in (1.47 m)
- Position: Striker

Team information
- Current team: APF F.C. (women) (assistant)

Senior career*
Years	Team	Apps	(Gls)
- APF F.C. (women)

International career
2010	Nepal U-23	5	(4)
2010—2022	Nepal	19	(35)
- * Club domestic league appearances and goals

Anu Lama (Nepali:अनु लामा) (born 3 October 1987) is a Nepalese former women's footballer. Lama is currently the second highest international goal-scorer in Nepal, with 35 international goals to her name.

== Personal life ==
Lama is also a member of the Armed Police Force. She along with Bhagwati Thapa, Laxmi Poudel and Usha Bhandari missed the first weeks of training for the 2014 SAFF Women's Championship because of the mandatory quarantine for the Ebola virus disease, as the four had served in the U.N. mission in Liberia.

== International career ==
Anu Lama made her debut for Nepal U-23 during the 2010 South Asian Games women's football tournament against Bangladesh. Lama performed well, landing Nepal a silver medal overall after scoring against Sri Lanka, and a hat-trick against Pakistan.

During the same year, Lama was called up for the senior team for the 2010 SAFF Women's Championship. In a friendly match against Kuwait Lama scored four goals in an 8-0 victory. After the match Lama dedicated the goals to all the Nepalese fans who had made the trip to support the team.

== International goals (incomplete) ==
Scores and results list Nepal's goal tally first.

#	Date	Venue	Opponent	Score	Result	Competition
1.	12 December 2010	Cox’s Bazar Stadium, Cox's Bazar	Maldives	1–0	6–0	2010 SAFF Women's Championship
2.	12 December 2010	Cox’s Bazar Stadium, Cox's Bazar	Maldives	2–0	6–0	2010 SAFF Women's Championship
3.	12 December 2010	Cox’s Bazar Stadium, Cox's Bazar	Maldives	6–0	6–0	2010 SAFF Women's Championship
4.	14 December 2010	Cox’s Bazar Stadium, Cox's Bazar	Afghanistan	1–0	13–0	2010 SAFF Women's Championship
5.	14 December 2010	Cox’s Bazar Stadium, Cox's Bazar	Afghanistan	4–0	13–0	2010 SAFF Women's Championship
6.	14 December 2010	Cox’s Bazar Stadium, Cox's Bazar	Afghanistan	5–0	13–0	2010 SAFF Women's Championship
7.	14 December 2010	Cox’s Bazar Stadium, Cox's Bazar	Afghanistan	7–0	13–0	2010 SAFF Women's Championship
8.	18 December 2010	Cox’s Bazar Stadium, Cox's Bazar	Pakistan	1–0	12–0	2010 SAFF Women's Championship
9.	18 December 2010	Cox’s Bazar Stadium, Cox's Bazar	Pakistan	7–0	12–0	2010 SAFF Women's Championship
10.	21 December 2010	Cox’s Bazar Stadium, Cox's Bazar	Bangladesh	1–0	3–0	2010 SAFF Women's Championship
11.	21 December 2010	Cox’s Bazar Stadium, Cox's Bazar	Bangladesh	2–0	3–0	2010 SAFF Women's Championship
12.	21 December 2010	Cox’s Bazar Stadium, Cox's Bazar	Bangladesh	3–0	3–0	2010 SAFF Women's Championship
13.	6 September 2012	CR & FC Grounds, Colombo	Pakistan	7–0	8–0	2012 SAFF Women's Championship
14.	10 September 2012	CR & FC Grounds, Colombo	Maldives	2–0	5–0	2012 SAFF Women's Championship
15.	12 September 2012	CR & FC Grounds, Colombo	Afghanistan	6–1	7–1	2012 SAFF Women's Championship
16.	12 September 2012	CR & FC Grounds, Colombo	Afghanistan	7–1	7–1	2012 SAFF Women's Championship
17.	14 September 2012	CR & FC Grounds, Colombo	Sri Lanka	1–0	3–0	2012 SAFF Women's Championship
18.	8 January 2013	Mohammed Al-Hamad Stadium, Kuwait City	Kuwait	2–0	8–0	Exhibition match
19.	8 January 2013	Mohammed Al-Hamad Stadium, Kuwait City	Kuwait	3–0	8–0	Exhibition match
20.	8 January 2013	Mohammed Al-Hamad Stadium, Kuwait City	Kuwait	6–0	8–0	Exhibition match
21.	8 January 2013	Mohammed Al-Hamad Stadium, Kuwait City	Kuwait	7–0	8–0	Exhibition match
22.	24 October 2013	Grand Hamad Stadium, Doha	Qatar	2–0	6–0	Exhibition match
23.	26 October 2013	Grand Hamad Stadium, Doha	Qatar	1–0	3–0	Exhibition match
24.	26 October 2013	Grand Hamad Stadium, Doha	Qatar	3–0	3–0	Exhibition match
25.	12 October 2014	Jinnah Stadium, Islamabad	Bhutan	3–0	8–0	2014 SAFF Women's Championship
26.	12 October 2014	Jinnah Stadium, Islamabad	Bhutan	4–0	8–0	2014 SAFF Women's Championship
27.	14 October 2014	Jinnah Stadium, Islamabad	Pakistan	1–0	2–0	2014 SAFF Women's Championship
28.	16 October 2014	Jinnah Stadium, Islamabad	Sri Lanka	2–0	3–0	2014 SAFF Women's Championship
29.	16 October 2014	Jinnah Stadium, Islamabad	Sri Lanka	3–0	3–0	2014 SAFF Women's Championship
30.	5 February 2016	Jawaharlal Nehru Stadium, Shillong	Bangladesh	2–0	3–0	2016 South Asian Games
