= 2012 SAFF Women's Championship =

Sri Lanka 2012

Tournament details
- Host country: Sri Lanka
- Dates: 7–16 September
- Teams: 8 (from 1 confederation)
- Venue: 1 (in 1 host city)

Final positions
- Champions: India (2nd title)
- Runners-up: Nepal

Tournament statistics
- Matches played: 15
- Goals scored: 75 (5 per match)
- Top scorer: (Nepal) Jamuna Gurung (8 goals)
- Best player: (India) Yumnam Kamala Devi

The 2012 SAFF Women's Championship is the 2nd SAFF Women's Championship since the first one in 2010. The competition is contested by the eight South Asian women football teams. India defended their 2010 title by defeating Nepal 3–1 in the final.

== Venue ==
All matches were played at the CR & FC Grounds in Colombo. The stadium has a capacity of 5,555 seats.

== Teams ==
Teams are:

Country	AFC rank	FIFA rank
India	11	52
Afghanistan	35	128
Bangladesh	23	115
Bhutan	33	128
Maldives	24	116
Nepal	30	97
Pakistan	32	128
Sri Lanka	31	128

== Fixtures and results ==
=== Group A ===
Team	Pld	W	D	L	GF	GA	GD	Pts
India	3	3	0	0	19	0	+19	9
Sri Lanka	3	2	0	1	6	6	0	6
Bangladesh	3	1	0	2	2	5	−3	3
Bhutan	3	0	0	3	0	16	−16	0

September 7, 2012
8:30 UTC+5:30

India	3–0	Bangladesh
Kamala Devi 64'; Bembem Devi 76'; Alochana Senapati 89'	Report

CR & FC Grounds, Colombo, Sri Lanka
Attendance: 4641
Referee: Mohomed Nizam (Sri Lanka)
September 7, 2012
15:30 UTC+5:30

Bhutan	0–4	Sri Lanka
	Report	Nilushika Kumari 4'; Erandi Kumudumala 21', 57'; Praveena Perera 84'

CR & FC Grounds, Colombo, Sri Lanka
Attendance: 1868
Referee: M Rahman (Bangladesh)

September 9, 2012
8:30 UTC+5:30

India	5–0	Sri Lanka
Suprava Samal 17'; Rinaroy Devi 32', 51'; Pinky Bompal Magar 53'; Prameshwori Devi 56'	Report

CR & FC Grounds, Colombo, Sri Lanka
Attendance: 3176
Referee: Shamsur Talukdar (Bangladesh)
September 9, 2012
15:30 UTC+5:30

Bangladesh	1–0	Bhutan
Suinu Pru 19'	Report

CR & FC Grounds, Colombo, Sri Lanka
Attendance: 4065
Referee: Chandrasiri Gedara

September 11, 2012
8:30 UTC+5:30

Bhutan	0–11	India
	Report	Tuli Goon 13'; Kamala Devi 23', 30'; Sasmita Mallik 27' (pen.); Pinky Bompal Magar 38', 49', 65'; Prameshwori Devi 42', 64'; Montesori Chanu 63'; Supriya Routray 73'

CR & FC Grounds, Colombo, Sri Lanka
Attendance: 2368
Referee: Mohommed Jamaldeen (Sri Lanka)
September 11, 2012
15:30 UTC+5:30

Bangladesh	1–2	Sri Lanka
Aungmraching Marma 75'	Report	Hasara Dilrangi 83'; Achala Chitrani 86'

CR & FC Grounds, Colombo, Sri Lanka
Attendance: 1733
Referee: Hiron Shetty (India)

=== Group B ===
Team	Pld	W	D	L	GF	GA	GD	Pts
Nepal	3	3	0	0	20	1	+19	9
Afghanistan	3	1	1	1	6	8	−2	4
Pakistan	3	1	0	2	3	12	−9	3
Maldives	3	0	1	2	1	9	−8	1

September 8, 2012
8:30 SST

Nepal	8–0	Pakistan
Jamuna Gurung 9', 32', 34', 44'; Pramila Rai 16'; Sajana Rana 42'; Anu Lama 51'; Dipa Adhikari 72'	Report

CR & FC Grounds, Colombo
Attendance: 870
Referee: Afsanul Haque (Maldives)
September 8, 2012
15:30 SST

Maldives	1–1	Afghanistan
Fathimath Afza 30'	Report	Diba Naweed 2'

CR & FC Grounds, Colombo
Attendance: 4873
Referee: Riaz Haque (Bangladesh )

September 10, 2012
8:30 SST

Nepal	5–0	Maldives
Dipa Adhikari 19'; Anu Lama 35'; Jamuna Gurung 59', 88', 90+1'	Report

CR & FC Grounds, Colombo
Attendance: 1319
Referee: Mizanur Chowdhury (Bangladesh)
September 10, 2012
15:30 SST

Pakistan	0–4	Afghanistan
	Report	Shabnam Rohin 8', 23'; Hailai Arghandiwal 51'; Marjan Haydaree 89'

CR & FC Grounds, Colombo
Attendance: 4870
Referee: Deponkor Ghosh (India)

September 12, 2012
8:30 SST

Nepal	7–1	Afghanistan
Niru Thapa 5', 45+2'; Jamuna Gurung 19'; Sajana Rana 47', 72'; Anu Lama 69', 89'	Report	Marjan Haydaree 42'

CR & FC Grounds, Colombo
Attendance: 1241
Referee: Hasan Mir (Pakistan)
September 12, 2012
15:30 SST

Maldives	0–3	Pakistan
	Report	Hajra Khan 12', 85'; Malika-e-Noor 69'

CR & FC Grounds, Colombo
Attendance: 4612
Referee: Farukh Islam (Bangladesh)

== Knockout stage ==
Semi-finals
14 September – Colombo
India	11
Afghanistan	0
14 September – Colombo
Nepal	3
Sri Lanka	0

Final
16 September – Colombo
India	3
Nepal	1

=== Semi finals ===
September 14, 2012
8:30 UTC+5:30

India	11–0	Afghanistan
Kamala Devi 5', 57', 90'; Prameshwori Devi 31'; Bembem Devi 40', 61', 70'; Sasmita Mallik 43', 78'; Romi Devi 59'; Pinky Bompal Magar 81'	Report

CR & FC Grounds, Colombo, Sri Lanka
Attendance: 1618
Referee: Nasiruddin Khan (Bangladesh)
September 14, 2012
15:30 UTC+5:30

Nepal	3–0	Sri Lanka
Anu Lama 48'; Dipa Adhikari 76'; Laxmi Poudel 90+3' (pen.)	Report

CR & FC Grounds, Colombo, Sri Lanka
Attendance: 1931
Referee: Abdullah Omar (Maldives)

== Final ==
September 16, 2012
13:30 UTC+5:30

India	3–1	Nepal
Supriya Routray 8'; Bembem Devi 66'; Kamala Devi 83'	Report	Dipa Adhikari 3'

CR & FC Grounds, Colombo, Sri Lanka
Attendance: 4961
Referee: Jahidur Islam (Bangladesh)

== Goalscorers ==
8 goals

- (Nepal) Jamuna Gurung

7 goals

- (India) Yumnam Kamala Devi

5 goals

- (Nepal) Anu Lama
- (India) Pinky Bompal Magar
- (India) Oinam Bembem Devi

4 goals

- (Nepal) Dipa Adhikari
- (India) Irom Prameshwori Devi

3 goals

- (India) Sasmita Malik
- (Nepal) Sajana Rana

2 goals

- (Afghanistan) Marjan Haydaree
- (Afghanistan) Shabnam Rohin
- (India) Salam Rinaroy Devi
- (India) Supriya Routray
- (Sri Lanka) Erandi Kumudumala
- (Nepal) Niru Thapa
- (Pakistan) Hajra Khan

1 goals

- (Afghanistan) Hailai Arghandiwal
- (Afghanistan) Diba Naweed
- (Bangladesh) Suinu Pru Marma
- (Bangladesh) Aungmraching Marma
- (India) Alochana Senapati
- (India) Suprava Samal
- (India) Nameirakpam Montesori Chanu
- (India) Tuli Goon
- (India) Ashem Romi Devi
- (Maldives) Fathimath Afza
- (Nepal) Pramila Rai
- (Nepal) Laxmi Poudel
- (Pakistan) Malika-e-Noor
- (Sri Lanka) Nilushika Kumari
- (Sri Lanka) Praveena Perera
- (Sri Lanka) Hasara Dilrangi
- (Sri Lanka) Achala Chitrani
