= Sasmita Mallik =

Indian footballer

Personal information
- Date of birth: 10 April 1989 (age 37)
- Place of birth: Goudapatana, Aul, Orissa, India
- Position: Left winger

Senior career*
Years	Team	Apps	(Gls)
- Odisha
2016–2017	Rising Students	11	(9)

International career
2006	India U19		
2007–2017	India	42	(36)
- * Club domestic league appearances and goals

Sasmita Mallik (born 10 April 1989) is an Indian former footballer who played as a left winger for India women's national football team. With 36 goals in 42 matches, she is the second highest all-time goal-scorer for the Indian women's national team after Bala Devi.

== Career ==
Mallik was born in the village Goudapatana near Aali in the Kendrapara district in Odisha. She was scouted and encouraged to pursue football by Devendra Sharma, the then MLA of Aul. She used to play a lot of local tournaments in Bhubaneswar. Later, she joined the Bhubaneswar Sports Hostel which laid the platform for her to join the National Side. Her first break came in 2004 when glimpses of her exceptional talent impressed all; Team India was then touring China.

She has been playing for the Senior National Team since 2007 and was part of the 2010 South Asian Games and back to back SAFF Women's Championship winning squads. She has also captained India women's national football team several times.

== Career statistics ==
=== International stats ===
International caps and goals
Year	Caps	Goals
2007	2	0
2010	10	19
2011	2	2
2012	5	3
2013	5	2
2014	3	5
2015	2	0
2016	7	2
2017	6	3
Total	42	36

=== International goals ===
No.	Date	Venue	Opponent	Score	Result	Competition
1.	29 January 2010	Bangabandhu National Stadium, Dhaka, Bangladesh	Sri Lanka	?–0	8–1	2010 South Asian Games
2.	31 January 2010	Bangabandhu National Stadium, Dhaka, Bangladesh	Pakistan	1–0	6–0	2010 South Asian Games
3.	31 January 2010	Bangabandhu National Stadium, Dhaka, Bangladesh	Pakistan	5–0	6–0	2010 South Asian Games
4.	4 February 2010	Bangabandhu National Stadium, Dhaka, Bangladesh	Nepal	?–0	5–0	2010 South Asian Games
5.	4 February 2010	Bangabandhu National Stadium, Dhaka, Bangladesh	Nepal	?–0	5–0	2010 South Asian Games
6.	13 December 2010	Cox's Bazar Stadium, Cox's Bazar, Bangladesh	Bhutan	?–0	18–0	2010 SAFF Women's Championship
7.	13 December 2010	Cox's Bazar Stadium, Cox's Bazar, Bangladesh	Bhutan	?–0	18–0	2010 SAFF Women's Championship
8.	13 December 2010	Cox's Bazar Stadium, Cox's Bazar, Bangladesh	Bhutan	?–0	18–0	2010 SAFF Women's Championship
9.	13 December 2010	Cox's Bazar Stadium, Cox's Bazar, Bangladesh	Bhutan	?–0	18–0	2010 SAFF Women's Championship
10.	13 December 2010	Cox's Bazar Stadium, Cox's Bazar, Bangladesh	Bhutan	?–0	18–0	2010 SAFF Women's Championship
11.	13 December 2010	Cox's Bazar Stadium, Cox's Bazar, Bangladesh	Bhutan	?–0	18–0	2010 SAFF Women's Championship
12.	13 December 2010	Cox's Bazar Stadium, Cox's Bazar, Bangladesh	Bhutan	?–0	18–0	2010 SAFF Women's Championship
13.	15 December 2010	Cox's Bazar Stadium, Cox's Bazar, Bangladesh	Sri Lanka	2–0	7–0	2010 SAFF Women's Championship
14.	15 December 2010	Cox's Bazar Stadium, Cox's Bazar, Bangladesh	Sri Lanka	3–0	7–0	2010 SAFF Women's Championship
15.	15 December 2010	Cox's Bazar Stadium, Cox's Bazar, Bangladesh	Sri Lanka	4–0	7–0	2010 SAFF Women's Championship
16.	17 December 2010	Cox's Bazar Stadium, Cox's Bazar, Bangladesh	Bangladesh	?–0	6–0	2010 SAFF Women's Championship
17.	17 December 2010	Cox's Bazar Stadium, Cox's Bazar, Bangladesh	Bangladesh	?–0	6–0	2010 SAFF Women's Championship
18.	20 December 2010	Cox's Bazar Stadium, Cox's Bazar, Bangladesh	Pakistan	?–0	8–0	2010 SAFF Women's Championship
19.	23 December 2010	Cox's Bazar Stadium, Cox's Bazar, Bangladesh	Nepal	1–0	1–0	2010 SAFF Women's Championship
20.	17 September 2011	Al Ahli Stadium, Manama, Bahrain	Bahrain	?–0	2–1	Friendly
21.	17 September 2011	Al Ahli Stadium, Manama, Bahrain	Bahrain	?–0	2–1	Friendly
22.	11 September 2012	CR & FC Grounds, Colombo, Sri Lanka	Bhutan	4–0	11–0	2012 SAFF Women's Championship
23.	14 September 2012	CR & FC Grounds, Colombo, Sri Lanka	Afghanistan	4–0	11–0	2012 SAFF Women's Championship
24.	14 September 2012	CR & FC Grounds, Colombo, Sri Lanka	Afghanistan	9–0	11–0	2012 SAFF Women's Championship
25.	23 May 2013	Faisal Al-Husseini International Stadium, Al-Ram, Palestine	Chinese Taipei	1–1	1–2	2014 AFC Women's Asian Cup qualification
26.	25 May 2013	Faisal Al-Husseini International Stadium, Al-Ram, Palestine	Palestine	1–0	1–1	2014 AFC Women's Asian Cup qualification
27.	14 September 2014	Incheon Namdong Asiad Rugby Field, Incheon, South Korea	Maldives	1–0	15–0	2014 Asian Games
28.	14 September 2014	Incheon Namdong Asiad Rugby Field, Incheon, South Korea	Maldives	4–0	15–0	2014 Asian Games
29.	14 September 2014	Incheon Namdong Asiad Rugby Field, Incheon, South Korea	Maldives	6–0	15–0	2014 Asian Games
30.	14 September 2014	Incheon Namdong Asiad Rugby Field, Incheon, South Korea	Maldives	14–0	15–0	2014 Asian Games
31.	14 September 2014	Incheon Namdong Asiad Rugby Field, Incheon, South Korea	Maldives	15–0	15–0	2014 Asian Games
32.	9 February 2016	Jawaharlal Nehru Stadium, Shillong, India	Sri Lanka	5–0	5–0	2016 South Asian Games
33.	27 December 2016	Kanchenjunga Stadium, Siliguri, India	Afghanistan	2–0	5–1	2016 SAFF Women's Championship
34.	2 January 2017	Kanchenjunga Stadium, Siliguri, India	Nepal	3–1	3–1	2016 SAFF Women's Championship
35.	4 January 2017	Kanchenjunga Stadium, Siliguri, India	Bangladesh	2–1	3–1	2016 SAFF Women's Championship
36.	11 April 2017	Kim Il-sung Stadium, Pyongyang, North Korea	Hong Kong	1–0	2–0	2018 AFC Women's Asian Cup qualification

== Honours ==
India

- SAFF Women's Championship: 2010, 2012, 2016
- South Asian Games Gold medal: 2010, 2016

Orissa

- Rajmata Jijabai Trophy: 2010–11, runner-up: 2007–08, 2009–10
- National Games Gold medal: 2011

Railways

- Rajmata Jijabai Trophy: 2015–16

Individual

- AIFF Women's Player of the Year: 2016
