= Football at the 2016 South Asian Games – Women's tournament =

2016 South Asian Games
Guwahati and Shillong 2016

Tournament details
- Host country: India
- Dates: 5 to 15 February 2016
- Teams: 5 (from 1 confederation)
- Venue: 1 (in 1 host city)

Final positions
- Champions: India (2nd title)
- Runners-up: Nepal
- Third place: Bangladesh

Tournament statistics
- Matches played: 11
- Goals scored: 32 (2.91 per match)
- Top scorer: (India) Yumnam Kamala Devi (5 Goals)

The women's football tournament of the 2016 South Asian Games is the second edition of the tournament. It was played at Jawaharlal Nehru Stadium in Shillong, India, from 5 February to 15 February 2016.

India defended their title with a 4–0 win over Nepal.

== Format ==
It is being played on round-robin format. The top two teams will be play in the final. The team finishing third in the group stage will be awarded with bronze medal.

== Group stage ==
Pos	Team	Pld	W	D	L	GF	GA	GD	Pts	Qualification
1	Nepal	4	3	1	0	9	0	+9	10	Advance to Final
2	India	4	2	2	0	10	1	+9	8	Advance to Final
3	Bangladesh	4	2	0	2	5	9	−4	6	Bronze Medal
4	Maldives	4	1	1	2	2	5	−3	4	
5	Sri Lanka	4	0	0	4	2	13	−11	0	

Source: Futbol24
Rules for classification: 1) points; 2) goal difference; 3) goals scored; 4) head-to-head result .

Matches

5 February 2016
9:30

Nepal	3–0	Bangladesh
Dipa Adhikari 13'; Anu 17'; Niru 90+2'	Report

Jawaharlal Nehru Stadium, Shillong
Attendance: 1,000
5 February 2016
13:30

India	0–0	Maldives
	Report

Jawaharlal Nehru Stadium, Shillong
Attendance: 5,000

7 February 2016
11:00

Nepal	2–0	Maldives
Anu Lama 36'; Niru Thapa 89'

Jawaharlal Nehru Stadium, Shillong
7 February 2016
16:00

Sri Lanka	1–2	Bangladesh
Ekanayake 68'	Report	65', 83' Krishna

Jawaharlal Nehru Stadium, Shillong

9 February 2016
11:00

Maldives	0–2	Bangladesh
	Report	48' Marzia Akhter; 73' Sabina

Jawaharlal Nehru Stadium, Shillong
9 February 2016
16:00

India	5–0	Sri Lanka
Hasara 24' (o.g.); Grace 45+1', 58'; Yumnam 60'; Sasmita 73' (pen.)

Jawaharlal Nehru Stadium, Shillong

11 February 2016
11:00

Nepal	0–0	India

Jawaharlal Nehru Stadium, Shillong
11 February 2016
16:00

Sri Lanka	1–2	Maldives
Hasara 90+1'		6', 45' (pen.) Fadhuwa

Jawaharlal Nehru Stadium, Shillong

13 February 2016
11:00

Nepal	4–0	Sri Lanka
A.S. Perera 13' (o.g.); Sabitra 51', 63'; Sapana 79'

Jawaharlal Nehru Stadium, Shillong
13 February 2016
16:00

India	5–1	Bangladesh
Yumnam 6', 37'; Bala Devi 13', 75'; Sanju Yadav 74'	Report	65' Sabina

Jawaharlal Nehru Stadium, Shillong

== Gold medal match ==
15 February 2016
16:00

Nepal	0–4	India
	Report	32', 56' Yumnam; 71' Bala Devi; 80' Ashalata

Jawaharlal Nehru Stadium, Shillong
Attendance: 23,000

== Winner ==
Football at the 2016 South Asian Games

India
Second title

== Goalscorers ==
5 Goals

- (India) Yumnam Kamala Devi

3 Goals

- (India) Ngangom Bala Devi

2 Goals

- (Nepal) Anu Lama
- (India) Grace Dangmei
- (Maldives) Fadhuwa Zahir
- (Nepal) Niru Thapa
- (Bangladesh) Sabina Khatun
- (Nepal) Sabitra Bhandari
- (Bangladesh) Krishna Rani Sarkar

1 Goal

- (India) Loitongbam Ashalata Devi
- (Nepal) Dipa Adhikari
- (Sri Lanka) Hasara Dilrangi
- (Bangladesh) Marzia
- (Sri Lanka) R Ekanayake
- (India) Sanju Yadav
- (Nepal) Sapana Lama
- (India) Sasmita Mallik

Own Goal

- (Sri Lanka) A.S. Perera (playing against Nepal)
- (Sri Lanka) Hasara Dilrangi (playing against India)

== See also ==
- Football at the 2016 South Asian Games – Men's tournament
