= Jamuna Gurung (footballer) =

Nepalese footballer

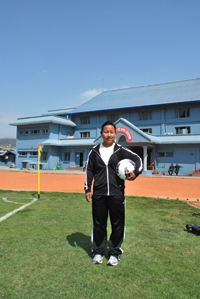
- Jamuna Gurung as captain of the Nepalese women's national football team

Personal information
- Full name: Jamuna Gurung
- Place of birth: Ramailo, Bayarban Morang, Nepal
- Height: 5 ft 1 in (1.55 m)
- Position: Striker

Senior career*
Years	Team	Apps	(Gls)
	APF Club		(35)

International career
	Nepal		(21)
- * Club domestic league appearances and goals

Jamuna Gurung (Nepali: जमुना गुरुङ) is a Nepalese international footballer. She is the former captain of the Nepalese women's national football team.
