= 2014 SAFF Women's Championship =

2014 SAFF خواتین کی چیمپئن شپ

Tournament details
- Host country: Pakistan
- City: Islamabad
- Dates: 11–21 November 2014
- Teams: 8 (from 1 confederation)
- Venue: 1 (in 1 host city)

Final positions
- Champions: India (3rd title)
- Runners-up: Nepal

Tournament statistics
- Matches played: 15
- Goals scored: 74 (4.93 per match)
- Attendance: 42,450 (2,830 per match)
- Top scorer: (India) Ngangom Bala Devi (16 goals)
- Best player: (Bangladesh) Sabina Khatun
- Fair play award: Maldives

The 2014 SAFF Women's Championship was an association football tournament for women's national teams organised by the South Asian Football Federation (SAFF). It was the third edition of the tournament since the first one in 2010. The competition was contested by the eight SAFF members. The tournament was hosted in Islamabad, Pakistan from 11 to 21 November 2014.

In the final, India successfully defended their title by beating Nepal in the final.

== Host selection ==
On 10 September 2013, SAFF executive committee decided that 3rd SAFF Women's Championship will be held in Pakistan.

== Venue ==
Jinnah Sports Stadium in Islamabad hosted all the matches. Although entry to all games was free, there were very few local spectators. After a suicide attack one week before start, there were some security concerns but the tournament was considered safe by the Pakistan Football Federation. Some matches were televised.

Islamabad	2014 SAFF Women's Championship is located in Pakistan
Jinnah Sports Stadium	2014 SAFF Women's Championship is located in Pakistan
Capacity: 48,820	2014 SAFF Women's Championship is located in Pakistan

== Fixtures and results ==
Draw was done on 10 November 2014 at Manager's meeting.

=== Group A ===
Team	Pld	W	D	L	GF	GA	GD	Pts
India	3	3	0	0	25	1	+24	9
Bangladesh	3	2	0	1	10	7	+3	6
Maldives	3	1	0	2	2	11	−9	3
Afghanistan	3	0	0	3	1	19	−18	0

13 November 2014

India	8–0	Maldives
Bala Devi 24', 46', 72', 74'; Kamala Devi 64', 85'; Bembem Devi 76'; Jyoti Ann Burrett 90'	Report

Jinnah Sports Stadium, Islamabad
Attendance: 250
13 November 2014

Bangladesh	6–1	Afghanistan
Maynum Rana 34'; Krishna Rani 36', 47', 69'; Sabina Khatun 62'; Musammat Mummun Ather 90+5'	Report	Marjan Haydaree 23'

Jinnah Sports Stadium, Islamabad
Attendance: 5,000

15 November 2014

Maldives	1–0	Afghanistan
Mariyam Rifa 34'	Report

Jinnah Sports Stadium, Islamabad
Attendance: 2,000
15 November 2014

India	5–1	Bangladesh
Umapati Devi 46'; Mandakini Devi 48'; Bala Devi 57' (pen.), 86'; Indumathi Kathiresan 76'	1 2	Sabina Khatun 50'

Jinnah Sports Stadium, Islamabad
Attendance: 2,000

17 November 2014

Afghanistan	0–12	India
	Report	Indumathi Kathiresan 3', 7', 51'; Bala Devi 4', 12', 33', 39', 84'; Prameshwori Devi 29', 45+2', 69'; Mandakini Devi 88'

Jinnah Sports Stadium, Islamabad
Attendance: 2,000
17 November 2014

Maldives	1–3	Bangladesh
Aishath Sama 81'	Report	Maynum Rana 18'; Sabina Khatun 35', 87'

Jinnah Sports Stadium, Islamabad
Attendance: 900

=== Group B ===
Team	Pld	W	D	L	GF	GA	GD	Pts
Nepal	3	3	0	0	13	0	+13	9
Sri Lanka	3	2	0	1	5	4	+1	6
Pakistan	3	1	0	2	5	5	0	3
Bhutan	3	0	0	3	1	15	−14	0

11 November 2014

Pakistan	1–2	Sri Lanka
Hajra Khan 90+1'	Report	Ishara Madushani 38'; Erandi Kumudumala 86'

Jinnah Sports Stadium, Islamabad
Attendance: 6,500
Referee: Kalpana Sharma (Nepal)
12 November 2014

Nepal	8–0	Bhutan
Sajana Rana 14', 45+1'; Menuka Giri 21'; Anu Lama 36', 40'; Dipa Adhikari 60', 84'; Sabitra Bhandari 88'	Report

Jinnah Sports Stadium, Islamabad
Attendance: 2,000

14 November 2014

Sri Lanka	3–0	Bhutan
Achala Chitrani 20'; Erandi Kumudumala 40'; Praveena Perea 88'	Report

Jinnah Sports Stadium, Islamabad
Attendance: 500
14 November 2014

Pakistan	0–2	Nepal
	Report	Anu Lama 14'; Sajana Rana 24'

Jinnah Sports Stadium, Islamabad
Attendance: 1,700

16 November 2014

Nepal	3–0	Sri Lanka
Niru Thapa 14'; Anu Lama 53' (pen.), 84'	Report

Jinnah Sports Stadium, Islamabad
Attendance: 600
16 November 2014

Pakistan	4–1	Bhutan
Sehar Zaman 55'; Shahlyla Baloch 68'; Shenaz Roshan 74'; Malika Noor 79' (pen.)	Report	Tshering Yangdon 69'

Jinnah Sports Stadium, Islamabad
Attendance: 4,000

== Knockout stage ==
Semi-finals
19 November – Islamabad
Sri Lanka	0
India	5
19 November – Islamabad
Nepal	1
Bangladesh	0

Final
21 November – Islamabad
India	6
Nepal	0

=== Semi-finals ===
19 November 2014

India	5–0	Sri Lanka
Indumathi Kathiresan 23', 69'; Bala Devi 31'; Prameshwori Devi 48'; Kamala Devi 72'	Report

Jinnah Sports Stadium, Islamabad
Attendance: 2,000
19 November 2014

Nepal	1–0	Bangladesh
Sajana Rana 56' (pen.)	Report

Jinnah Sports Stadium, Islamabad
Attendance: 5,000

== Final ==
21 November 2014

India	6–0	Nepal
Kamala Devi 26'; Bala Devi 40', 41', 51', 90+1'; Prameshwori Devi 47'	Report

Jinnah Sports Stadium, Islamabad
Attendance: 8,000

== Goalscorers ==
16 goals

- (India) Ngangom Bala Devi

6 goals

- (India) Indumathi Kathiresan

5 goals

- (Nepal) Anu Lama
- (India) Irom Prameshwori Devi

4 goals

- (Bangladesh) Sabina Khatun
- (India) Yumnam Kamala Devi
- (Nepal) Sajana Rana

3 goals

- (Bangladesh) Krishna Rani Sarkar

2 goals

- (Bangladesh) Suinu Pru Marma
- (Nepal) Dipa Adhikari
- (Sri Lanka) Erandi Kumudumala

1 goals

- (Afghanistan) Marjan Haydaree
- (Bangladesh) Musammat Mummun Ather
- (India) Jyoti Ann Burrett
- (India) Moirangthem Mandakini Devi
- (India) Oinam Bembem Devi
- (India) Thokchom Umapati Devi
- (Maldives) Mariyam Rifa
- (Nepal) Sabitra Bhandari
- (Nepal) Menuka Giri
- (Nepal) Niru Thapa
- (Pakistan) Sehar Zaman
- (Pakistan) Shahlyla Baloch
- (Pakistan) Shenaz Roshan
- (Pakistan) Malika Noor
- (Pakistan) Hajra Khan
- (Sri Lanka) Achala Chitrani
- (Sri Lanka) Ishara Madushani
- (Sri Lanka) Praveena Perea
