= Cox's Bazar Stadium =

Football stadium in Cox's Bazar, Bangladesh

- Interactive map of Cox's Bazar Stadium
- Location: District council Road, Cox's Bazar, Bangladesh
- Coordinates: 21°26′22.49″N 91°58′35.02″E
- Owner: National Sports Council
- Operator: National Sports Council
- Capacity: 5,000
- Field size: 115 × 80 m (377 × 262 ft)
- Field shape: Rectangular

Construction
- Opened: 1957

Tenants
- Bangladesh national football team; Comilla Football Team; 2010 SAFF Women's Championship

Cox's Bazar Stadium, also known as Bir Shrestha Ruhul Amin Stadium, is a football stadium situated by the south side of Cox's Bazar Medical College Hospital and east side of Cox's Bazar district council.

== See also ==
- List of football stadiums in Bangladesh
- Stadiums in Bangladesh
