= Niru Thapa =

Footballer

Personal information
- Place of birth: Nepal
- Position: Midfielder

Team information
- Current team: Nepal Police Club

Senior career*
Years	Team	Apps	(Gls)
- Nepal Police Club

International career^{‡}
2010–	Nepal	41	(13)
- * Club domestic league appearances and goals ‡ National team caps and goals as of 18 April 2019

Niru Thapa (Nepali: निरु थापा) is a Nepalese footballer who plays as a midfielder for Nepal Police Club and captains the Nepal women's national football team.

== Career ==
At the club level, Niru plays for Nepal Police Club of Nepal.

=== International career ===
Niru Thap represents Nepal at the international level. She is current nepali national team captain.
