= CR & FC Grounds =

Stadium in Colombo, Sri Lanka

CR & FC Ground
- Longdon Place
- Location within Greater Colombo
- Location: Colombo, Sri Lanka
- Coordinates: 6°54′1″N 79°52′15″E
- Owner: Ceylonese Rugby & Football Club
- Capacity: 5,550+
- Type: Stadium Complex
- Events: Sporting Events, Concerts
- Surface: Grass

Construction
- Renovated: 2007

Tenant
- Ceylonese Rugby & Football Club

Ceylonese Rugby & Football Club Grounds (also known as Longdon Place) commonly known as CR & FC is a multi-purpose stadium complex located in Colombo, Sri Lanka.

It is the home ground of Division 'A' rugby union team, Ceylonese Rugby & Football Club, and on occasion hosts concerts and musical performances.

== Concerts ==
- Spanish singer Enrique Iglesias performed at CR & FC on 20 December 2015 as part of his Sex and Love Tour in Asia
- Irish boy band, Boyzone, performed at CR & FC Grounds on 16 August 2018 as a part of their Farewell Tour.
