= 2024–25 Rajmata Jijabai Trophy =

Senior Women's National Football Championship

Tournament details
- Country: India
- Dates: 5 October 2024 – 23 December 2024
- Teams: 33

Final positions
- Champions: Manipur (23rd title)
- Runners-up: Odisha

Tournament statistics
- Matches played: 68
- Goals scored: 379 (5.57 per match)

The 2024–25 Senior Women's National Football Championship for Rajmata Jijabai Trophy was the 29th edition of the Senior Women's National Football Championship, the premier competition in India for women's teams representing regional and state football associations.

== Format ==
A total of 31 teams - excluding last season's finalists Manipur and Haryana, who have received a bye to the Final Round - were drawn into seven groups of four and one group of three. The eight best-performing teams, excluding the finalists, from last season's Final Round are the top seeds for the 2024-25 edition. The top seeded teams - Tamil Nadu, West Bengal, Railways, Delhi, Punjab, Odisha, Sikkim, and Jharkhand - were assigned into Groups A to H, respectively. All the remaining participating teams were placed in an open pot and drawn sequentially into Group A to H.

The eight group winners will join Manipur and Haryana in the Final Round, where they will be drawn into two groups of five teams each. The top two teams from each group will qualify for the semi-finals.

=== Centralized venue ===
- Group A → TMK Arena, Panniyankara, Palakkad, Kerala
- Group B → DL Roy Memorial District Stadium, Nadia, West Bengal
- Group C → Shaheed Vijay Singh Pathik Sports Stadium, Noida, Uttar Pradesh
- Group D → Vidyadharnagar Stadium, Jaipur
- Group E → Vidyadharnagar Stadium, Jaipur
- Group F → RDT Stadium, Anantapur, Andhra Pradesh
- Group G → Umakanta Mini Stadium, Agartala, Tripura
- Group H → Kanchenjunga Stadium, Siliguri, West Bengal

Venues in India
Palakkad	Nadia	Gautam Buddha Nagar
TMK Arena	DL Roy Memorial District Stadium	Shaheed Vijay Singh Pathik Sports Stadium
TMK Arena	DL Roy Memorial District Stadium	Capacity: 8,000
Jaipur	2024–25 Rajmata Jijabai Trophy is located in India	
Vidyadharnagar Stadium	2024–25 Rajmata Jijabai Trophy is located in India	
Anantapur	West Tripura	Darjeeling & Jalpaiguri
RDT Stadium	Umakanta Mini Stadium	Kanchenjunga Stadium
5,000	5,000	40,000

== Group Stage ==
=== Group A ===
Pos	Team	Pld	W	D	L	GF	GA	GD	Pts	Qualification
1	Tamil Nadu	3	2	0	1	4	2	+2	6	Advance to Final Round
2	Kerala (H)	3	2	0	1	8	3	+5	6	
3	Goa	3	2	0	1	8	2	+6	6	
4	Himachal Pradesh	3	0	0	3	0	13	−13	0	

Source: AIFF
Rules for classification: 1) points; 2) goal difference; 3) goals scored; 4) head-to-head result.
(H) Hosts

=== Group B ===
Pos	Team	Pld	W	D	L	GF	GA	GD	Pts	Qualification
1	West Bengal (H)	3	3	0	0	24	0	+24	9	Advance to Final Round
2	Karnataka	3	2	0	1	14	3	+11	6	
3	Bihar	3	1	0	2	7	3	+4	3	
4	Jammu and Kashmir	3	0	0	3	0	39	−39	0	

Source: AIFF
Rules for classification: 1) points; 2) goal difference; 3) goals scored; 4) head-to-head result.
(H) Hosts

=== Group C ===
Pos	Team	Pld	W	D	L	GF	GA	GD	Pts	Qualification
1	Railways	3	3	0	0	23	2	+21	9	Advance to Final Round
2	Uttar Pradesh	3	2	0	1	8	6	+2	6	
3	Assam	3	1	0	2	3	9	−6	3	
4	Andhra Pradesh	3	0	0	3	2	19	−17	0	

Source: AIFF
Rules for classification: 1) points; 2) goal difference; 3) goals scored; 4) head-to-head result.

=== Group D ===
Pos	Team	Pld	W	D	L	GF	GA	GD	Pts	Qualification
1	Maharashtra	3	2	1	0	38	1	+37	7	Advance to Final Round
2	Delhi	3	2	1	0	33	1	+32	7	
3	Pondicherry	3	1	0	2	10	22	−12	3	
4	Andaman and Nicobar	3	0	0	3	0	57	−57	0	

Source: AIFF
Rules for classification: 1) points; 2) goal difference; 3) goals scored; 4) head-to-head result.

=== Group E ===
Pos	Team	Pld	W	D	L	GF	GA	GD	Pts	Qualification
1	Punjab	3	2	1	0	15	2	+13	7	Advance to Final Round
2	Chhattisgarh	3	2	1	0	8	2	+6	7	
3	Uttarakhand	3	1	0	2	7	5	+2	3	
4	Rajasthan (H)	3	0	0	3	0	21	−21	0	

Source: AIFF
Rules for classification: 1) points; 2) goal difference; 3) goals scored; 4) head-to-head result.
(H) Hosts

=== Group F ===
Pos	Team	Pld	W	D	L	GF	GA	GD	Pts	Qualification
1	Odisha	3	2	1	0	19	0	+19	7	Advance to Final Round
2	Arunachal Pradesh	3	2	1	0	10	0	+10	7	
3	Ladakh	3	1	0	2	2	9	−7	3	
4	Madhya Pradesh	3	0	0	3	0	22	−22	0	

Source: AIFF
Rules for classification: 1) points; 2) goal difference; 3) goals scored; 4) head-to-head result.

=== Group G ===
Pos	Team	Pld	W	D	L	GF	GA	GD	Pts	Qualification
1	Sikkim	3	3	0	0	17	1	+16	9	Advance to Final Round
2	Gujarat	3	2	0	1	19	4	+15	6	
3	Tripura (H)	3	1	0	2	5	9	−4	3	
4	Chandigarh	3	0	0	3	0	27	−27	0	

Source: AIFF
Rules for classification: 1) points; 2) goal difference; 3) goals scored; 4) head-to-head result.
(H) Hosts

=== Group H ===
Pos	Team	Pld	W	D	L	GF	GA	GD	Pts	Qualification
1	Jharkhand	2	2	0	0	3	0	+3	6	Advance to Final Round
2	Mizoram	2	1	0	1	9	1	+8	3	
3	Telangana	2	0	0	2	0	11	−11	0	

Source: AIFF
Rules for classification: 1) points; 2) goal difference; 3) goals scored; 4) head-to-head result.

== Final Round ==
The eight group winners will join Manipur and Haryana in the Final Round, where they will be drawn into two groups of five teams each.

=== Venue ===
All matches including knockouts and finals will be played at this ground.

Narayanpur
Ramakrishna Mission Sports Complex
Capacity: 1,000

=== Qualified Teams ===
- Manipur (Winner of Previous Season)
- Haryana (Runners-up of Previous Season)
- Tamil Nadu (Winner of Group A)
- West Bengal (Winner of Group B)
- Railways (Winner of Group C)
- Maharashtra (Winner of Group D)
- Punjab (Winner of Group E)
- Odisha (Winner of Group F)
- Sikkim (Winner of Group G)
- Jharkhand (Winner of Group H)

=== Group A ===
Pos	Team	Pld	W	D	L	GF	GA	GD	Pts	Qualification
1	Manipur	4	4	0	0	15	2	+13	12	Advance to Knockout Stage
2	Odisha	4	2	1	1	7	3	+4	7	Advance to Knockout Stage
3	Jharkhand	4	2	0	2	7	9	−2	6	
4	Tamil Nadu	4	1	1	2	6	7	−1	4	
5	Maharashtra	4	0	0	4	2	16	−14	0	

Source: AIFF
Rules for classification: 1) points; 2) head-to-head points; 3) head-to-head goal difference; 4) head-to-head goals scored; 5) goal difference; 6) number of goals scored; 7) fair play ranking; 8) drawing of lots

=== Group B ===
Pos	Team	Pld	W	D	L	GF	GA	GD	Pts	Qualification
1	Haryana	4	3	0	1	9	1	+8	9	Advance to Knockout Stage
2	West Bengal	4	3	0	1	12	2	+10	9	Advance to Knockout Stage
3	Railways	4	3	0	1	15	6	+9	9	
4	Sikkim	4	0	1	3	3	9	−6	1	
5	Punjab	4	0	1	3	1	22	−21	1	

Source: AIFF
Rules for classification: 1) points; 2) head-to-head points; 3) head-to-head goal difference; 4) head-to-head goals scored; 5) goal difference; 6) number of goals scored; 7) fair play ranking; 8) drawing of lot

== Knockout stage ==
=== Bracket ===
Semi-finals
Manipur	3
West Bengal	0
Haryana	0
Odisha	2

Final
Manipur	1
Odisha	0

=== Semi-finals ===
21 December 2024	Manipur	3–0	West Bengal	Narayanpur
9:00 IST	Dangmei 53'; Priyangka Devi 55'; Shilky Devi 79'	Report		Stadium: Ramakrishna Mission Sports Complex; Attendance: 700; Referee: Ruba Devi G Player of the Match: Grace Dangmei (Manipur)

21 December 2024	Haryana	0–2	Odisha	Narayanpur
14:00 IST		Report	Xaxa 10', 88'	Stadium: Ramakrishna Mission Sports Complex; Attendance: 400; Referee: Rachana Hasmukh Kamani; Player of the Match: Pyari Xaxa (Odisha)

=== Final ===
23 December 2024	Manipur	1–0	Odisha	Narayanpur
14:00 IST	Roja Devi 55'	Report		Stadium: Ramakrishna Mission Sports Complex; Attendance: 10,000; Referee: Ruba Devi G Player of the Match: Hemam Shilky Devi (Manipur)

== Top scorers ==
Sl	Player name	Team	Goals
1	Yumnam Kamala Devi	Railways	14
2	Deepika Pal	Delhi	12
3	Pyari Xaxa	Odisha	12
4	Sulanjana Raul	West Bengal	11
5	Simran Gurung	Sikkim	11

== See also ==
- 2024–25 Santosh Trophy
