= 2023–24 Rajmata Jijabai Trophy =

Senior Women's National Football Championship

Tournament details
- Country: India
- Dates: 12 November 2023 – April 2024
- Teams: 33

Final positions
- Champions: Manipur (22nd title)
- Runners-up: Haryana

The 2023–24 Senior Women's National Football Championship for Rajmata Jijabai Trophy was the 28th edition of the Senior Women's National Football Championship, the premier competition in India for women's teams representing regional and state football associations.

== Format ==
Thirty teams have been divided into six groups in the qualifying round, which will be played in six different venues across the country. The Final Round of the competition will have a total of 12 teams. Three teams have gained direct entry to the final round - defending champions Tamil Nadu, last season's runners-up Haryana and final round hosts West Bengal.

The six group winners and three best runners-up will qualify for the final round which will be held in West Bengal in April 2024. The final round will be held with two groups of six teams each. The top two teams will qualify for the semi-finals.

=== Schedule ===
Matchday	Dates					
Matchday	Group A	Group B	Group C	Group D	Group E	Group F
Matchday 1	24 November 2023	15 November 2023	23 November 2023	15 November 2023	12 November 2023	21 November 2023
Matchday 2	26 November 2023	17 November 2023	25 November 2023	17 November 2023	14 November 2023	23 November 2023
Matchday 3	28 November 2023	19 November 2023	27 November 2023	19 November 2023	16 November 2023	25 November 2023
Matchday 4	1 December 2023		30 November 2023	22 November 2023	19 November 2023	27 November 2023
Matchday 5	3 December 2023		3 December 2023	24 November 2023	21 November 2023	29 November 2023

=== Centralised venues ===
- Group A → Mahamaya Sports Stadium, Ghaziabad, Uttar Pradesh
- Group B → DL Roy Memorial District Stadium, Krishnanagar, West Bengal
- Group C → Bangalore Football Stadium, Bengaluru, Karnataka
- Group D → GNDU Sports Complex, Amritsar, Punjab
- Group E → Sundargarh Stadium and Biju Patnaik Mini Stadium, Sundargarh, Odisha
- Group F → SAI Ground and NIT Ground, Anu, Hamirpur, Himachal Pradesh

== Group stage ==
=== Group A ===
Pos	Team	Pld	W	D	L	GF	GA	GD	Pts	Qualification
1	Manipur	3	3	0	0	27	0	+27	9	Advance to Final Round
2	Chhattisgarh	3	1	1	1	8	8	0	4	
3	Uttar Pradesh (H)	3	1	1	1	8	12	−4	4	
4	Rajasthan	3	0	0	3	2	25	−23	0	
5	Mizoram	0	0	0	0	0	0	0	0	Withdrew

Source: AIFF
Rules for classification: 1) points; 2) goal difference; 3) goals scored; 4) head-to-head result.
(H) Hosts

=== Group B ===
Pos	Team	Pld	W	D	L	GF	GA	GD	Pts	Qualification
1	Delhi	3	3	0	0	19	1	+18	9	Advance to Final Round
2	Madhya Pradesh	3	1	1	1	5	4	+1	4	
3	Telangana	3	1	1	1	1	8	−7	4	
4	Andhra Pradesh	3	0	0	3	0	12	−12	0	

Updated to match(es) played on 22 November 2023. Source: AIFF
Rules for classification: 1) points; 2) goal difference; 3) goals scored; 4) head-to-head result.

=== Group C ===
Pos	Team	Pld	W	D	L	GF	GA	GD	Pts	Qualification
1	Sikkim	5	4	1	0	12	1	+11	13	Advance to Final Round
2	Chandigarh	5	2	3	0	5	2	+3	9	Advance to Final Round
3	Kerala	5	3	0	2	23	6	+17	9	
4	Karnataka (H)	5	2	1	2	15	6	+9	7	
5	Assam	5	1	1	3	7	16	−9	4	
6	Tripura	5	0	0	5	0	31	−31	0	

Source: AIFF
Rules for classification: 1) points; 2) goal difference; 3) goals scored; 4) head-to-head result.
(H) Hosts

=== Group D ===
Pos	Team	Pld	W	D	L	GF	GA	GD	Pts	Qualification
1	Punjab (H)	4	4	0	0	12	3	+9	12	Advance to Final Round
2	Jharkhand	4	3	0	1	6	2	+4	9	Advance to Final Round
3	Uttarakhand	4	2	0	2	6	6	0	6	
4	Jammu and Kashmir	4	1	0	3	1	6	−5	3	
5	Ladakh	4	0	0	4	1	9	−8	0	

Source: AIFF
Rules for classification: 1) points; 2) goal difference; 3) goals scored; 4) head-to-head result.
(H) Hosts

=== Group E ===
Pos	Team	Pld	W	D	L	GF	GA	GD	Pts	Qualification
1	Odisha (H)	4	4	0	0	15	4	+11	12	Advance to Final Round
2	Goa	4	2	1	1	8	5	+3	7	
3	Arunachal Pradesh	4	2	0	2	13	9	+4	6	
4	Gujarat	4	1	1	2	4	10	−6	4	
5	Meghalaya	4	0	0	4	3	15	−12	0	

Source: AIFF
Rules for classification: 1) points; 2) goal difference; 3) goals scored; 4) head-to-head result.
(H) Hosts

=== Group F ===
Pos	Team	Pld	W	D	L	GF	GA	GD	Pts	Qualification
1	Railways	4	4	0	0	38	0	+38	12	Advance to Final Round
2	Maharashtra	4	3	0	1	33	2	+31	9	Advance to Final Round
3	Bihar	4	2	0	2	24	7	+17	6	
4	Himachal Pradesh (H)	4	1	0	3	17	20	−3	3	
5	Andaman & Nicobar	4	0	0	4	0	83	−83	0	

Source: AIFF
Rules for classification: 1) points; 2) goal difference; 3) goals scored; 4) head-to-head result.
(H) Hosts

== Final Round ==
=== Qualified teams ===
- Tamil Nadu (Automatic qualification)
- Haryana (Automatic qualification)
- West Bengal (Hosts)
- Manipur (Group A winners)
- Delhi (Group B winners)
- Sikkim (Group C winners)
- Punjab (Group D winners)
- Odisha (Group E winners)
- Railways (Group F winners)
- Chandigarh (Group C runners-up)
- Jharkhand (Group D runners-up)
- Maharashtra (Group F runners-up)

=== Group A ===
Pos	Team	Pld	W	D	L	GF	GA	GD	Pts	Qualification
1	Tamil Nadu	5	4	1	0	15	2	+13	13	Advance to Knockout Stage
2	West Bengal (H)	5	3	1	1	12	6	+6	10	Advance to Knockout Stage
3	Railways	5	3	1	1	14	6	+8	10	
4	Delhi	5	2	0	3	4	12	−8	6	
5	Punjab	5	1	0	4	6	17	−11	3	
6	Chandigarh	5	0	1	4	0	8	−8	1	

Source: AIFF
Rules for classification: 1) points; 2) head-to-head points; 3) head-to-head goal difference; 4) head-to-head goals scored; 5) goal difference; 6) number of goals scored; 7) fair play ranking; 8) drawing of lots
(H) Hosts

=== Group B ===
Pos	Team	Pld	W	D	L	GF	GA	GD	Pts	Qualification
1	Haryana	5	4	1	0	12	1	+11	13	Advance to Knockout Stage
2	Manipur	5	4	0	1	22	4	+18	12	Advance to Knockout Stage
3	Odisha	5	3	1	1	12	6	+6	10	
4	Sikkim	5	1	1	3	9	23	−14	4	
5	Jharkhand	5	1	0	4	7	17	−10	3	
6	Maharashtra	5	0	1	4	3	14	−11	1	

Source: AIFF
Rules for classification: 1) points; 2) head-to-head points; 3) head-to-head goal difference; 4) head-to-head goals scored; 5) goal difference; 6) number of goals scored; 7) fair play ranking; 8) drawing of lots

== Knockout stage ==
=== Bracket ===
Semi-finals
Tamil Nadu	0
Manipur	2
Haryana (p)	0 (4)
West Bengal	0 (3)

Final
Manipur	2
Haryana	0

=== Semi-finals ===
13 May 2024	Tamil Nadu	0–2	Manipur
: IST		Report

13 May 2024	Haryana	0–0 (4–3 p)	West Bengal
: IST		Report

=== Final ===
15 May 2024	Manipur	2–0	Haryana
15:00 IST		Report
