= 2019–20 Senior Women's National Football Championship =

2019–20 Women's National Football Championship
Tournament details
- Country: India
- Dates: 10–24 September 2019
- Teams: 30

Final positions
- Champions: Manipur (20th title)
- Runners-up: Railways

Tournament statistics
- Matches played: 46
- Goals scored: 240 (5.22 per match)
- Top goal scorer(s): Bala Devi (Manipur; 21 goals)

Awards
- Best player: Bala Devi
- Best goalkeeper: Panthoi Chanu

The 2019–20 Senior Women's National Football Championship, also known as Hero Senior Women's National Football Championship for sponsorship reasons, was the 25th edition of the Senior Women's National Football Championship, the premier competition in India for women's teams representing regional and state football associations. The tournament was hosted in Pasighat, Arunachal Pradesh, between 10 and 24 September 2019 at the Indira Gandhi Golden High School, Kiyit Secondary School and Daying Ering Football Stadium, Nari.

Manipur, who were the defending champions retained the title beating Railways 1–0 in the final. Manipur's Bala Devi, with 21 goals, was the highest scorer of the tournament. Her side's goalkeeper Panthoi Chanu was bestowed with the best goalkeeper award.

== Format ==
30 teams competed in the tournament and were split into eight groups of three to four teams each in the preliminary round.

=== Round dates ===
Round	Match dates
Group stage	10 – 18 September 2019
Quarter-finals	19 – 20 September 2019
Semi-finals	22 September 2019
Final	24 September 2019

== Group stage ==
=== Group A ===
Pos	Team	Pld	W	D	L	GF	GA	GD	Pts	Qualification
1	Railways	3	2	1	0	22	0	+22	7	Advance to Quarter-finals
2	Mizoram	3	2	0	1	6	4	+2	6	
3	Assam	3	1	1	1	9	2	+7	4	
4	Andhra Pradesh	3	0	0	3	0	31	−31	0	

Source: All India Football Federation
Rules for classification: 1) points; 2) goal difference; 3) goals scored; 4) head-to-head result.

10 September 2019	Railways	4–0	Mizoram

10 September 2019	Andhra Pradesh	0–9	Assam

13 September 2019	Mizoram	4–0	Andhra Pradesh

13 September 2019	Assam	0–0	Railways

16 September 2019	Railways	18–0	Andhra Pradesh

16 September 2019	Assam	0–2	Mizoram

=== Group B ===
Pos	Team	Pld	W	D	L	GF	GA	GD	Pts	Qualification
1	Madhya Pradesh	3	2	1	0	6	4	+2	7	Advance to Quarter-finals
2	Haryana	3	2	0	1	13	3	+10	6	
3	Bihar	3	1	1	1	6	9	−3	4	
4	Karnataka	3	0	0	3	1	10	−9	0	

Source: All India Football Federation
Rules for classification: 1) points; 2) goal difference; 3) goals scored; 4) head-to-head result.

10 September 2019	Haryana	1–2	Madhya Pradesh

10 September 2019	Bihar	3–0	Karnataka

13 September 2019	Madhya Pradesh	2–2	Bihar

13 September 2019	Karnataka	0–5	Haryana

16 September 2019	Haryana	7–1	Bihar

16 September 2019	Karnataka	1–2	Madhya Pradesh

=== Group C ===
Pos	Team	Pld	W	D	L	GF	GA	GD	Pts	Qualification
1	Tamil Nadu	3	3	0	0	9	0	+9	9	Advance to Quarter-finals
2	Goa	3	2	0	1	8	3	+5	6	
3	Chhattisgarh	2	0	0	2	0	6	−6	0	
4	Uttar Pradesh	2	0	0	2	1	9	−8	0	

Source: All India Football Federation
Rules for classification: 1) points; 2) goal difference; 3) goals scored; 4) head-to-head result.

11 September 2019	Tamil Nadu	5–0	Chhattisgarh

11 September 2019	Goa	7–1	Uttar Pradesh

14 September 2019	Chhattisgarh	0–1	Goa

14 September 2019	Uttar Pradesh	0–2	Tamil Nadu

17 September 2019	Tamil Nadu	2–0	Goa

17 September 2019	Uttar Pradesh	Cancelled	Chhattisgarh

=== Group D ===
Pos	Team	Pld	W	D	L	GF	GA	GD	Pts	Qualification
1	Himachal Pradesh	2	1	0	1	4	2	+2	3	Advance to Quarter-finals
2	Maharashtra	2	1	0	1	2	2	0	3	
3	Delhi	2	1	0	1	3	5	−2	3	

Source: All India Football Federation
Rules for classification: 1) points; 2) goal difference; 3) goals scored; 4) head-to-head result.

14 September 2019	Maharashtra	1–0	Himachal Pradesh

14 September 2019	Himachal Pradesh	4–1	Delhi

17 September 2019	Delhi	2–1	Maharashtra

=== Group E ===
Pos	Team	Pld	W	D	L	GF	GA	GD	Pts	Qualification
1	Odisha	3	3	0	0	12	0	+12	9	Advance to Quarter-finals
2	Kerala	3	1	0	2	9	6	+3	3	
3	Puducherry	2	1	0	1	2	5	−3	3	
4	Chandigarh	2	0	0	2	0	12	−12	0	

Source: All India Football Federation
Rules for classification: 1) points; 2) goal difference; 3) goals scored; 4) head-to-head result.

11 September 2019	Odisha	4–0	Puducherry

11 September 2019	Kerala	8–0	Chandigarh

14 September 2019	Chandigarh	0–4	Odisha

15 September 2019	Puducherry	2–1	Kerala

17 September 2019	Odisha	4–0	Kerala

17 September 2019	Chandigarh	Cancelled	Puducherry

=== Group F ===
Pos	Team	Pld	W	D	L	GF	GA	GD	Pts	Qualification
1	Jharkhand	3	2	1	0	10	1	+9	7	Advance to Quarter-finals
2	Punjab	3	2	1	0	10	1	+9	7	
3	Gujarat	3	1	0	2	2	8	−6	3	
4	Uttarakhand	3	0	0	3	0	12	−12	0	

Source: All India Football Federation
Rules for classification: 1) points; 2) goal difference; 3) goals scored; 4) head-to-head result.

12 September 2019	Punjab	6–0	Uttarakhand

12 September 2019	Gujarat	0–5	Jharkhand

15 September 2019	Uttarakhand	0–2	Gujarat

15 September 2019	Jharkhand	1–1	Punjab

18 September 2019	Punjab	3–0	Gujarat

18 September 2019	Jharkhand	4–0	Uttarakhand

=== Group G ===
Pos	Team	Pld	W	D	L	GF	GA	GD	Pts	Qualification
1	Manipur	3	3	0	0	20	0	+20	9	Advance to Quarter-finals
2	West Bengal	3	2	0	1	18	5	+13	6	
3	Tripura	3	1	0	2	13	10	+3	3	
4	Rajasthan	3	0	0	3	0	36	−36	0	

Source: All India Football Federation
Rules for classification: 1) points; 2) goal difference; 3) goals scored; 4) head-to-head result.

12 September 2019	Manipur	4–0	West Bengal

12 September 2019	Rajasthan	0–12	Tripura

15 September 2019	West Bengal	14–0	Rajasthan

15 September 2019	Tripura	0–6	Manipur

18 September 2019	Manipur	10–0	Rajasthan

18 September 2019	Tripura	1–4	West Bengal

=== Group H ===
Pos	Team	Pld	W	D	L	GF	GA	GD	Pts	Qualification
1	Arunachal Pradesh	2	2	0	0	4	0	+4	6	Advance to Quarter-finals
2	Telangana	2	0	0	2	0	4	−4	0	
3	Jammu and Kashmir	0	0	0	0	0	0	0	0	Withdrawn

Source: All India Football Federation
Rules for classification: 1) points; 2) goal difference; 3) goals scored; 4) head-to-head result.

12 September 2019	Arunachal Pradesh	2–0	Telangana

15 September 2019	Telangana	0–2	Arunachal Pradesh

== Bracket ==
Quarter-finals
Madhya Pradesh	2
Tamil Nadu	4
Railways	12
Himachal Pradesh	0
Odisha	5
Arunachal Pradesh	0
Jharkhand	2
Manipur	15

Semi-finals
Tamil Nadu	1
Railways	3
Odisha	0
Manipur	5

Final
Railways	0
Manipur	1

== Quarter-finals ==
*Quarter-finals were played on 19 and 20 September 2019.

Team 1	Score	Team 2
Karnataka	2–4	Tamil Nadu
Railways	12–0	Himachal Pradesh
Jharkhand	2–15	Manipur
Odisha	5–0	Arunachal Pradesh

19 September 2019	Karnataka	2–4	Tamil Nadu	Pasighat
10:30 IST	Radhika Manjhi 16'; Jyoti Chouhan 55'	Report	Ranjitha 8', 42'; R. Pandiselvi 38', 49'	Stadium: KIYIT Stadium; Player of the Match: Ranjitha (Tamil Nadu)

19 September 2019	Railways	12–0	Himachal Pradesh	Pasighat
13:30 IST	Kamala Devi 9', 30', 34', 42', 45+4', 90+2'; Mamta 21'; Mamata Patra 33' (o.g.); Sanju 38', 51'; Malik 57'; Ashalata Devi 89'	Report		Stadium: KIYIT Stadium; Attendance: 2,000; Player of the Match: Yumnam Kamala Devi (Railways)

20 September 2019	Jharkhand	2–15	Manipur	Pasighat
9:30 IST	Neel Lakra 21'; Sangita Kumari 82'	Report	Bala Devi 8', 16', 26', 31', 33', 35', 47', 52', 77', 84'; Prameshwori Devi 17'; Daya Devi 36', 38', 48', 73'	Stadium: CHF Ground; Attendance: 2,000; Player of the Match: Ngangom Bala Devi (Manipur)

20 September 2019	Odisha	5–0	Arunachal Pradesh	Pasighat
14:00 IST	Deepa Nayak 16', 74'; Runi Nayak 39'; Jasoda Munda 45+1'; Sumitra Xalxo 71'	Report		Stadium: CHF Ground; Attendance: 7,000; Player of the Match: Deepa Nayak (Odisha)

== Semi-finals ==
*Semi-finals were played on 22 September 2019.

Team 1	Score	Team 2
Railways	3–1	Odisha
Tamil Nadu	0–5	Manipur

22 September 2019	Railways	3–1	Odisha	Pasighat
9:30 IST	Kamala Devi 10' (pen.), 60'; Mamta 23'	Report	Jasoda Munda 88'	Stadium: CHF Ground; Player of the Match: Yumnam Kamala Devi (Railways)

22 September 2019	Tamil Nadu	0–5	Manipur	Pasighat
14:00 IST		Report	Bala Devi 10'; Daya Devi 14', 39', 84'; Prameshwori Devi 35'	Stadium: CHF Ground; Player of the Match: Heigrujam Daya Devi (Manipur)

== Final ==
24 September 2019	Railways	0–1	Manipur	Pasighat
14:00 IST	Ngoubi Devi (yellow card) 78'	Report	Bala Devi 67'; Umapati Devi (yellow card) 74'; Rinaroy Devi (yellow card) 85'	Stadium: CHF Ground; Player of the Match: Sanju (Railways)
