= 2021–22 Senior Women's National Football Championship =

2021–22 Women's National Football Championship
Tournament details
- Country: India
- Dates: 28 November – 9 December 2021
- Teams: 32

Final positions
- Champions: Manipur (21st title)
- Runners-up: Railways

Tournament statistics
- Matches played: 52
- Goals scored: 220 (4.23 per match)
- Top goal scorer(s): Sandhiya Ranganathan (12 goals)

Awards
- Best player: Irom Prameshwori Devi
- Best goalkeeper: Okram Roshini Devi

The 2021–22 Senior Women's National Football Championship, also known as Hero Senior Women's National Football Championship for sponsorship reasons, was the 26th edition of the Senior Women's National Football Championship, the premier competition in India for women's teams representing regional and state football associations. The tournament was hosted in Kerala, between 28 November and 9 December 2021.

Manipur, the defending champions retained the title after beating Railways 2–1`in the penalty shootout in the final. Tamil Nadu's Sandhiya Ranganathan, with 12 goals, was the highest scorer of the tournament, while Manipur's goalkeeper Okram Roshini Devi won the best goalkeeper award.

== Format ==
32 teams competed in the tournament and were split into eight groups of four teams each in the preliminary round.

=== Round dates ===
Round	Match dates
Group stage	28 November – 3 December 2021
Quarter-finals	5 December 2021
Semi-finals	7 December 2021
Final	9 December 2021

== Group stage ==
=== Group A ===
Pos	Team	Pld	W	D	L	GF	GA	GD	Pts	Qualification
1	Manipur	3	3	0	0	21	0	+21	9	Advance to Quarter-finals
2	Daman and Diu	3	2	0	1	4	6	−2	6	
3	Meghalaya	3	1	0	2	5	6	−1	3	
4	Pondicherry	3	0	0	3	0	18	−18	0	

Rules for classification: 1) points; 2) goal difference; 3) goals scored; 4) head-to-head result.

28 November 2021	Manipur	4–0	Meghalaya	Kuthuparamba
09:30 IST	Asem Roja Devi 45+2'; Moirangthem Mandakini Devi 45+3'; Yangoijam Kiranbala Chanu 54'; Thingbaijam Babysana Devi 81'	Report		Stadium: Municipal Stadium; Player of the Match: Irom Prameshwori Devi

28 November 2021	Daman and Diu	2–0	Pondicherry	Kuthuparamba
14:30 IST	Diksha Bansod 17'; Boomidha V 48' (o.g.)	Report		Stadium: Municipal Stadium; Player of the Match: Afreen

30 November 2021	Meghalaya	1–2	Daman and Diu	Kuthuparamba
09:30 IST	Ibashisha Khongwet 34'	Report	Nirmala Durve 51'; Jeewanti 79'	Stadium: Municipal Stadium; Player of the Match: Jeewanti

30 November 2021	Pondicherry	0–12	Manipur	Kuthuparamba
14:30 IST		Report	Irom Prameshwori Devi 1', 7', 21', 31', 47'; Yangoijam Kiranbala Chanu 8', 70'; Salam Rinaroy Devi 23'; Moirangthem Mandakini Devi 45+3'; Preetha M 49' (o.g.); Thingbaijam Babysana Devi 66'; Kangabam Anita Devi 81'	Stadium: Municipal Stadium; Player of the Match: Irom Prameshwori Devi

2 December 2021	Manipur	5–0	Daman and Diu	Kuthuparamba
09:30 IST	Irom Prameshwori Devi 26', 74'; Salam Rinaroy Devi 45+1'; Moirangthem Mandakini Devi 86'; Sultana MS 90+2'	Report		Stadium: Municipal Stadium; Player of the Match: Irom Prameshwori Devi

2 December 2021	Pondicherry	0–4	Meghalaya	Kuthuparamba
14:30 IST		Report	Ibashisha Khongwet 7', 57', 85'; Saralin Warlarpih 45+2'	Stadium: Municipal Stadium; Player of the Match: Ibashisha Khongwet

=== Group B ===
Pos	Team	Pld	W	D	L	GF	GA	GD	Pts	Qualification
1	Railways	2	2	0	0	9	0	+9	6	Advance to Quarter-finals
2	Chhattisgarh	2	1	0	1	9	4	+5	3	
3	Dadra and Nagar Haveli	2	0	0	2	0	14	−14	0	
4	Tripura	0	0	0	0	0	0	0	0	Withdrew

Rules for classification: 1) points; 2) goal difference; 3) goals scored; 4) head-to-head result.

28 November 2021	Chhattisgarh	9–0	Dadra and Nagar Haveli	Kozhikode
14:30 IST	Shubhangi Subba 13', 72'; Kiran Pisda 46', 80', 90+5'; Masipogu Puspa 48'; Hina Nirmalkar 82'; Priyanka Futan 88', 90'	Report		Stadium: Calicut University; Player of the Match: Priyanka Futan

30 November 2021	Dadra and Nagar Haveli	0–5	Railways	Kozhikode
09:30 IST		Report	Mamta 28', 49', 66', 76'; Supriya Routray 31'	Stadium: Calicut University; Player of the Match: Mamta

2 December 2021	Railways	4–0	Chhattisgarh	Kozhikode
09:30 IST	Naobi Chanu Laishram 70'; Tara Khatoon 80'; Mamta 82', 83'	Report		Stadium: Calicut University; Player of the Match: Supriya Routray

=== Group C ===
Pos	Team	Pld	W	D	L	GF	GA	GD	Pts	Qualification
1	Assam	3	3	0	0	17	2	+15	9	Advance to Quarter-finals
2	Himachal Pradesh	3	2	0	1	5	4	+1	6	
3	Bihar	3	0	1	2	5	13	−8	1	
4	Rajasthan	3	0	1	2	2	10	−8	1	

Rules for classification: 1) points; 2) goal difference; 3) goals scored; 4) head-to-head result.

29 November 2021	Himachal Pradesh	3–2	Bihar	Kuthuparamba
09:30 IST	Mamta 45+2', 53'; Priyanka Dutta 79'	Report	Nisha Kumari 17'; Neha Kumari 63'	Stadium: Municipal Stadium; Player of the Match: Mamta

29 November 2021	Assam	7–0	Rajasthan	Kuthuparamba
14:30 IST	Rupali Boro 3'; Mridula Mech 8'; Sainjali Kemprai 49'; Sonia Marak 58', 61', 81'; Sanila Basumatary 90+1'	Report		Stadium: Municipal Stadium; Player of the Match: Sonia Marak

1 December 2021	Bihar	1–8	Assam	Kuthuparamba
09:30 IST	Putul Kumari 59'	Report	Rupali Boro 2'; Sanila Basumatary 16'; Sonia Marak 20', 77', 78'; Sainjali Kemprai 21', 81'; Swapnali Mili 57'	Stadium: Municipal Stadium; Player of the Match: Sonia Marak

1 December 2021	Rajasthan	0–1	Himachal Pradesh	Kuthuparamba
14:30 IST		Report	Poonam 15'	Stadium: Municipal Stadium; Player of the Match: Riya Sharma

3 December 2021	Himachal Pradesh	1–2	Assam	Kuthuparamba
09:30 IST	Poonam 52'	Report	Sonia Marak 35'; Mina Basumatary 49'	Stadium: Municipal Stadium; Player of the Match: Sonia Marak

3 December 2021	Rajasthan	2–2	Bihar	Kuthuparamba
14:30 IST	Riya Jasrotia 83', 90+4'	Report	Archana Kumari 55'; Baby Kumari 59'	Stadium: Municipal Stadium; Player of the Match: Riya Jasrotia

=== Group D ===
Pos	Team	Pld	W	D	L	GF	GA	GD	Pts	Qualification
1	Goa	3	2	1	0	6	1	+5	7	Advance to Quarter-finals
2	Jharkhand	3	2	0	1	3	3	0	6	
3	Delhi	3	1	1	1	4	4	0	4	
4	Karnataka	3	0	0	3	1	6	−5	0	

Rules for classification: 1) points; 2) goal difference; 3) goals scored; 4) head-to-head result.

29 November 2021	Jharkhand	1–0	Karnataka	Kozhikode
09:30 IST	Parnita Tirkey 79'	Report		Stadium: Calicut University; Player of the Match: Asha Mahima Beck

29 November 2021	Delhi	1–1	Goa	Kozhikode
14:30 IST	Mamta 18'	Report	Arpita Yeshwant Pednekar 34'	Stadium: Calicut University; Player of the Match: Janice Gomes

1 December 2021	Karnataka	1–2	Delhi	Kozhikode
09:30 IST	Savi Mehta 11' (o.g.)	Report	Anjana Thapa 4', 85'	Stadium: Calicut University; Player of the Match: Anjana Thapa

1 December 2021	Goa	2–0	Jharkhand	Kozhikode
14:30 IST	Stessi Cardozo 45+4'; Sushmita Jadhav 51'	Report		Stadium: Calicut University; Player of the Match: Stessi Cardozo

3 December 2021	Jharkhand	2–1	Delhi	Kozhikode
09:30 IST	Alisha Tigga 24', 63'	Report	Anjali 55'	Stadium: Calicut University; Player of the Match: Deepika Venkatesh

3 December 2021	Goa	3–0	Karnataka	Kozhikode
14:30 IST	Rizella Cia Almeida 19', 24'; Sushmita Jadhav 45+3'	Report		Stadium: Calicut University; Player of the Match: Rizella Cia Almeida

=== Group E ===
Pos	Team	Pld	W	D	L	GF	GA	GD	Pts	Qualification
1	Maharashtra	3	2	1	0	9	1	+8	7	Advance to Quarter-finals
2	Sikkim	3	2	1	0	8	1	+7	7	
3	Jammu & Kashmir	3	1	0	2	1	7	−6	3	
4	Arunachal Pradesh	3	0	0	3	0	9	−9	0	

Rules for classification: 1) points; 2) goal difference; 3) goals scored; 4) head-to-head result.

29 November 2021	Arunachal Pradesh	0–6	Maharashtra	Kozhikode
09:30 IST		Report	Valencia Lourdina D'Mello 49', 79'; Karen Pais 73', 76', 89'; Trupti Deep 88'	Stadium: EMS Stadium; Player of the Match: Karen Pais

29 November 2021	Jammu & Kashmir	0–5	Sikkim	Kozhikode
14:30 IST		Report	Suju Hangma Limboo 24', 39', 57'; Karishma Rai 41'; Nim Riki Sherpa 79'	Stadium: EMS Stadium; Player of the Match: Suju Hangma Limboo

1 December 2021	Maharashtra	2–0	Jammu & Kashmir	Kozhikode
09:30 IST	Aishwarya Bhonde 47'; Sapna Jaiswar 88'	Report		Stadium: EMS Stadium; Player of the Match: Akanksha Kandalkar

1 December 2021	Sikkim	2–0	Arunachal Pradesh	Kozhikode
14:30 IST	Suju Hangma Limboo 1'; Prekila Tamang 67'	Report		Stadium: EMS Stadium; Player of the Match: Prekila Tamang

3 December 2021	Arunachal Pradesh	0–1	Jammu & Kashmir	Kozhikode
09:30 IST		Report	Pooja Devi 41'	Stadium: EMS Stadium; Player of the Match: Pooja Devi

3 December 2021	Sikkim	1–1	Maharashtra	Kozhikode
14:30 IST	Suju Hangma Limboo 67'	Report	Trupti Deep 62'	Stadium: EMS Stadium; Player of the Match: Trupti Deep

=== Group F ===
Pos	Team	Pld	W	D	L	GF	GA	GD	Pts	Qualification
1	Odisha	3	3	0	0	18	1	+17	9	Advance to Quarter-finals
2	Haryana	3	2	0	1	9	2	+7	6	
3	Gujarat	3	1	0	2	5	12	−7	3	
4	Andhra Pradesh	3	0	0	3	1	18	−17	0	

Rules for classification: 1) points; 2) goal difference; 3) goals scored; 4) head-to-head result.

28 November 2021	Odisha	9–0	Andhra Pradesh	Kozhikode
09:30 IST	Jabamani Tudu 9', 14'; Soni Behera 30'; Deepa Nayak 49'; Satyabati Khadia 52'; Subhadra Sahu 84'; Karishma Oram 85', 86'; Jasoda Munda 90+4'	Report		Stadium: Calicut Medical College; Player of the Match: Jabamani Tudu

28 November 2021	Haryana	4–0	Gujarat	Kozhikode
14:30 IST	Karuna 7'; Tanu 39'; Jyoti 75'; Parveen 82'	Report		Stadium: Calicut Medical College; Player of the Match: Karuna

30 November 2021	Andhra Pradesh	0–4	Haryana	Kozhikode
09:30 IST		Report	Jyoti 4'; Vidhi 22'; Tanu 71'; Pooja 75'	Stadium: Calicut Medical College; Player of the Match: P Padmaja

30 November 2021	Gujarat	0–7	Odisha	Kozhikode
14:30 IST		Report	Subhadra Sahu 22', 23', 38'; Satyabati Khadia 25', 28', 45+1'; Suman Pragyna Mohapatra 48'	Stadium: Calicut Medical College; Player of the Match: Subhadra Sahu

2 December 2021	Odisha	2–1	Haryana	Kozhikode
09:30 IST	Deepa Nayak 19'; Bannya Kabiraj 74'	Report	Parveen 34'	Stadium: Calicut Medical College; Player of the Match: Sharda

2 December 2021	Gujarat	5–1	Andhra Pradesh	Kozhikode
14:30 IST	Shreya Oza 36', 53'; Anoushka Nair 49'; Sonal Parmar 51'; Muskan Rafiq Bhai Sindhi 89'	Report	Boya Dasari Anitha 28'	Stadium: Calicut Medical College; Player of the Match: Anoushka Nair

=== Group G ===
Pos	Team	Pld	W	D	L	GF	GA	GD	Pts	Qualification
1	Mizoram	3	2	1	0	7	2	+5	7	Advance to Quarter-finals
2	Kerala	3	1	1	1	6	5	+1	4	
3	Madhya Pradesh	3	1	1	1	5	6	−1	4	
4	Uttarakhand	3	0	1	2	2	7	−5	1	

Rules for classification: 1) points; 2) goal difference; 3) goals scored; 4) head-to-head result.

28 November 2021	Madhya Pradesh	4–1	Uttarakhand	Kozhikode
09:30 IST	Madhu Raghav 21'; Arti Rathore 50', 56'; Pallavi Goswami 90+3'	Report	Bhagwati Chauhan 73'	Stadium: EMS Stadium; Player of the Match: Arti Rathore

28 November 2021	Kerala	2–3	Mizoram	Kozhikode
14:30 IST	Athulya K V 44'; Femina Rag Valappil 45'	Report	Grace Lalrampari Hauhnar 39'; Elizabeth Vanlalmawii 79'; Lalnunsiami 90+3'	Stadium: EMS Stadium; Player of the Match: Elizabeth Vanlalmawii

30 November 2021	Uttarakhand	1–3	Kerala	Kozhikode
09:30 IST	Bhagwati Chauhan 53'	Report	Vinitha Vijayan 44'; Manasa K 75'; Femina Rag Valappil 86'	Stadium: EMS Stadium; Player of the Match: Bhagwati Chauhan

30 November 2021	Mizoram	4–0	Madhya Pradesh	Kozhikode
14:30 IST	Lalnunsiami 11'; Elizabeth Vanlalmawii 46'; Zairemmawii Chawngthu 49'; Grace Lalrampari Hauhnar 54'	Report		Stadium: EMS Stadium; Player of the Match: Elizabeth Vanlalmawii

2 December 2021	Madhya Pradesh	1–1	Kerala	Kozhikode
09:30 IST	Shilpa Soni 18'	Report	C Reshma 20'	Stadium: EMS Stadium; Player of the Match: Aarti Banwari

2 December 2021	Mizoram	0–0	Uttarakhand	Kozhikode
14:30 IST		Report		Stadium: EMS Stadium; Player of the Match: Bhagwati Chauhan

=== Group H ===
Pos	Team	Pld	W	D	L	GF	GA	GD	Pts	Qualification
1	Tamil Nadu	3	2	1	0	27	1	+26	7	Advance to Quarter-finals
2	West Bengal	3	1	2	0	21	1	+20	5	
3	Punjab	3	1	1	1	21	6	+15	4	
4	Telangana	3	0	0	3	0	61	−61	0	

Rules for classification: 1) points; 2) goal difference; 3) goals scored; 4) head-to-head result.

29 November 2021	Tamil Nadu	20–0	Telangana	Kozhikode
09:30 IST	Malavika M 3', 45+2', 87'; Sandhiya 5', 22', 24', 63', 70', 88', 89', 90'; M. Saritha 10', 58', 65', 68'; Durga A 15', 20', 79'; Priyadharshini S. 49'; Rudrarapu Ravali 78' (o.g.)	Report		Stadium: Calicut Medical College; Player of the Match: Sandhiya

29 November 2021	Punjab	0–0	West Bengal	Kozhikode
14:30 IST		Report		Stadium: Calicut Medical College; Player of the Match: Deepika

1 December 2021	Telangana	0–21	Punjab	Kozhikode
09:30 IST		Report	Neha Mann 11', 40'; Nisha 18', 43', 45+2', 57', 61', 63', 89'; Asha Kumari 20', 45', 68', 74'; Deepika 33', 34', 39', 45+3', 46', 56', 90+3'; Binita Kerketta 90+2'	Stadium: Calicut Medical College; Player of the Match: Deepika

1 December 2021	West Bengal	1–1	Tamil Nadu	Kozhikode
14:30 IST	Sumitra Marandi 45'	Report	Sandhiya 20'	Stadium: Calicut Medical College; Player of the Match: Sandhiya

3 December 2021	Tamil Nadu	6–0	Punjab	Kozhikode
09:30 IST	Durga A 25'; Kowsalya S 45+2'; Sandhiya 57', 84', 90+2'; Priyadharshini S. 87'	Report		Stadium: Calicut Medical College; Player of the Match: Sandhiya

3 December 2021	West Bengal	20–0	Telangana	Kozhikode
14:30 IST	Huidrom Ranjita Devi 10', 20', 25', 34', 39', 47', 58', 71', 90+2'; Naorem Sumila Chanu 11', 18', 55'; Gita Das 13', 22', 35'; Dular Marandi 28'; Kajal Das 68', 84'; Sandhya Maity 89', 90'	Report		Stadium: Calicut Medical College; Player of the Match: Huidrom Ranjita Devi

== Bracket ==
Quarter-finals
Mizoram	4
Maharashtra	1
Railways	4
Goa	2
Odisha	2
Tamil Nadu	0
Manipur	2
Assam	0

Semi-finals
Mizoram	1 (5)
Railways (p)	1 (6)
Odisha	1 (0)
Manipur (p)	1 (3)

Final
Railways	0 (1)
Manipur (p)	0 (2)

== Quarter-finals ==
5 December 2021	Railways	4–2	Goa	Kozhikode
09:30 IST	Supriya Routray 45+1', 56', 58'; Mamta 69'	Report	Sushmita Jadhav 33', 90+1'	Stadium: Calicut Medical College; Player of the Match: Sushmita Jadhav

5 December 2021	Manipur	2–0	Assam	Kuthuparamba
09:30 IST	Yangoijam Kiranbala Chanu 9'; Thingbaijam Babysana Devi 65'	Report		Stadium: Municipal Stadium; Player of the Match: Irom Prameshwori Devi

5 December 2021	Odisha	2–0	Tamil Nadu	Kozhikode
15:00 IST	Karishma Oram 27'; Satyabati Khadia 37'	Report		Stadium: EMS Stadium; Player of the Match: Sasmita Parida

5 December 2021	Maharashtra	1–4	Mizoram	Kozhikode
15:00 IST	Karen Pais 47'	Report	Elizabeth Vanlalmawii 10', 87'; Lalnunsiami 24', 66'	Stadium: EMS Stadium; Player of the Match: Elizabeth Vanlalmawii

== Semi-finals ==
7 December 2021	Mizoram	1–1 (5–6 p)	Railways	Kozhikode
09:30 IST	Lalnunsiami 90+4'	Report	Mamta 70'	Stadium: EMS Stadium; Player of the Match: Lalnunsiami
	Penalties
	Grace Lalrampari Hauhnar (penalty missed); Lallungmuani (penalty scored); K. Ngopawdi (penalty scored); Ruthy Lalrinmawii (penalty scored); Lalnunsiami (penalty scored); Elizabeth Vanlalmawii (penalty scored); Vanlalhmangahzuali (penalty missed)		(penalty scored) Supriya Routray; (penalty scored) Ravina Yadav; (penalty scored) Sasmita Swain; (penalty scored) Naobi Chanu Laishram; (penalty missed) Suprava Samal; (penalty scored) Kshetrimayum Ngoubi Devi; (penalty scored) Nandini Munda

7 December 2021	Manipur	1–1 (3–0 p)	Odisha	Kozhikode
15:00 IST	Yangoijam Kiranbala Chanu 45+3'	Report	Yumlembam Pakpi Devi 11' (o.g.)	Stadium: EMS Stadium; Player of the Match: Juli Kishan
	Penalties
	Sultana MS (penalty scored); Babysana Devi (penalty scored); Asem Roja Devi (penalty scored)		(penalty missed) Jasoda Munda; (penalty missed) Subhadra Sahu; (penalty missed) Suman Pragnya Mohapatra

== Final ==
9 December 2021	Manipur	0–0 (2–1 p)	Railways	Kozhikode
15:00 IST		Report		Stadium: EMS Stadium; Player of the Match: Irom Prameshwori Devi
	Penalties
	Sultana MS (penalty missed); Babysana Devi (penalty scored); Asem Roja Devi (penalty missed); Yangoijam Kiranbala Chanu (penalty scored)		(penalty missed) Supriya Routray; (penalty scored) Naobi Laishram; (penalty missed) Sasmita Swain; (penalty missed) Moirangthem Mandakini Devi; (penalty missed) Suprava Samal

== Awards ==
Award	Player	Team
Best Goalkeeper	Okram Roshini Devi	Manipur
Top Goal-scorer	Sandhiya Ranganathan	Tamil Nadu
Most Valuable Player	Irom Prameshwori Devi	Manipur
