= 2025–26 Rajmata Jijabai Trophy =

Senior Women's National Football Championship

Tournament details
- Country: India
- Dates: 4 September 2025 – 15 October 2025
- Teams: 33

Final positions
- Champions: Manipur (24th title)
- Runners-up: West Bengal

Tournament statistics
- Matches played: 68
- Goals scored: 354 (5.21 per match)
- Top goal scorer(s): Shilji Shaji (Kerala)

The 2025–26 Senior Women's National Football Championship for Rajmata Jijabai Trophy is the 30th edition of the Senior Women's National Football Championship, the premier competition in India for women's teams representing regional and state football associations.

== Format ==
A total of 31 teams – excluding last season's finalists Manipur and Odisha, who have received a bye to the Final Round – were drawn into seven groups of four and one group of three. The eight best-performing teams, excluding the finalists, from last season's Final Round are the top seeds for the 2024–25 edition. All the remaining participating teams were placed in an open pot and drawn sequentially into Group A to H.

The eight group winners will join Manipur and Odisha in the Final Round, where they will be drawn into two groups of five teams each. The top two teams from each group will qualify for the semi-finals.

== First round ==
=== Qualified teams ===
The eight groups were announced by All India Football Federation on 4 September 2025.

Group A	Group B	Group C	Group D
Punjab; Himachal Pradesh; Ladakh; Jammu & Kashmir	Haryana; Delhi; Uttarakhand	Uttar Pradesh; Bihar; Jharkhand; Rajasthan	West Bengal; Sikkim; Meghalaya; Railways
Group E	Group F	Group G	Group H
Assam; Arunachal Pradesh; Mizoram; Tripura	Chhattisgarh; Andhra Pradesh; Telangana; Karnataka	Tamil Nadu; Kerala; Pondicherry; Andaman & Nicobar	Goa; Maharashtra; Gujarat; Madhya Pradesh

=== Group A ===
Pos	Team	Pld	W	D	L	GF	GA	GD	Pts	Qualification
1	Punjab (H)	3	3	0	0	11	1	+10	9	Advance to Final Round
2	Himachal Pradesh	3	1	1	1	9	4	+5	4	
3	Ladakh	3	1	1	1	4	4	0	4	
4	Jammu & Kashmir	3	0	0	3	0	15	−15	0	

Source: AIFF
Rules for classification: 1) points; 2) goal difference; 3) goals scored; 4) head-to-head result.
(H) Hosts

=== Group B ===
Pos	Team	Pld	W	D	L	GF	GA	GD	Pts	Qualification
1	Haryana	2	2	0	0	7	1	+6	6	Advance to Final Round
2	Delhi	2	1	0	1	9	3	+6	3	
3	Uttarakhand (H)	2	0	0	2	0	12	−12	0	

Source: AIFF
Rules for classification: 1) points; 2) goal difference; 3) goals scored; 4) head-to-head result.
(H) Hosts

=== Group C ===
Pos	Team	Pld	W	D	L	GF	GA	GD	Pts	Qualification
1	Uttar Pradesh	3	3	0	0	10	1	+9	9	Advance to Final Round
2	Jharkhand	3	2	0	1	16	3	+13	6	
3	Bihar	3	1	0	2	6	3	+3	3	
4	Rajasthan	3	0	0	3	0	25	−25	0	

Source: AIFF
Rules for classification: 1) points; 2) goal difference; 3) goals scored; 4) head-to-head result.

=== Group D ===
Pos	Team	Pld	W	D	L	GF	GA	GD	Pts	Qualification
1	West Bengal (H)	3	3	0	0	19	1	+18	9	Advance to Final Round
2	Sikkim	3	2	0	1	5	7	−2	6	
3	Railways	3	1	0	2	6	10	−4	3	
4	Meghalaya	3	0	0	3	2	14	−12	0	

Source: AIFF
Rules for classification: 1) points; 2) goal difference; 3) goals scored; 4) head-to-head result.
(H) Hosts

=== Group E ===
Pos	Team	Pld	W	D	L	GF	GA	GD	Pts	Qualification
1	Assam (H)	3	3	0	0	15	1	+14	9	Advance to Final Round
2	Arunachal Pradesh	3	1	1	1	4	3	+1	4	
3	Mizoram	3	1	1	1	3	5	−2	4	
4	Tripura	3	0	0	3	0	13	−13	0	

Source: AIFF
Rules for classification: 1) points; 2) goal difference; 3) goals scored; 4) head-to-head result.
(H) Hosts

=== Group F ===
Pos	Team	Pld	W	D	L	GF	GA	GD	Pts	Qualification
1	Chhattisgarh	3	2	1	0	24	1	+23	7	Advance to Final Round
2	Karnataka	3	2	1	0	6	1	+5	7	
3	Telangana	3	1	0	2	8	12	−4	3	
4	Andhra Pradesh	3	0	0	3	1	25	−24	0	

Source: AIFF
Rules for classification: 1) points; 2) goal difference; 3) goals scored; 4) head-to-head result.

=== Group G ===
Pos	Team	Pld	W	D	L	GF	GA	GD	Pts	Qualification
1	Tamil Nadu	3	3	0	0	22	1	+21	9	Advance to Final Round
2	Kerala (H)	3	2	0	1	45	2	+43	6	
3	Pondicherry	3	1	0	2	21	19	+2	3	
4	Andaman & Nicobar	3	0	0	3	0	66	−66	0	

Source: AIFF
Rules for classification: 1) points; 2) goal difference; 3) goals scored; 4) head-to-head result.
(H) Hosts

=== Group H ===
Pos	Team	Pld	W	D	L	GF	GA	GD	Pts	Qualification
1	Goa	3	3	0	0	11	1	+10	9	Advance to Final Round
2	Gujarat (H)	3	2	0	1	9	1	+8	6	
3	Maharashtra	3	1	0	2	6	6	0	3	
4	Madhya Pradesh	3	0	0	3	1	19	−18	0	

Source: AIFF
Rules for classification: 1) points; 2) goal difference; 3) goals scored; 4) head-to-head result.
(H) Hosts

== Final round ==
The eight group winners will join Manipur and Odisha in the Final Round, where they will be drawn into two groups of five teams each.

=== Venue ===
All matches including knockouts and finals will be played at this ground.

Narayanpur
Ramakrishna Mission Sports Complex
Capacity: 1,000

=== Qualified teams ===
Group A	Group B
Odisha (Note: Runners-up of previous edition. Thus exempted from first round.); Tamil Nadu (G1); West Bengal (D1); Chhattisgarh (F1); Goa (H1)	Manipur (Note: Champions of previous edition. Thus exempted from first round.); Punjab (A1); Haryana (B1); Uttar Pradesh (C1); Assam (E1)

=== Group A ===
Pos	Team	Pld	W	D	L	GF	GA	GD	Pts	Qualification	WB	TN	OD	CG	GOA
1	West Bengal	4	3	1	0	7	0	+7	10	Advance to Knockout stage		3–0	1–0	3–0	0–0
2	Tamil Nadu	4	2	1	1	8	4	+4	7	Advance to Knockout stage			1–1	2–0	5–0
3	Odisha	4	2	1	1	5	4	+1	7					3–0	4–2
4	Chhattisgarh (H)	4	1	0	3	2	6	−4	3						2–1
5	Goa	4	0	1	3	3	11	−8	1						

Source: AIFF
Rules for classification: 1) points; 2) goal difference; 3) goals scored; 4) head-to-head result.
(H) Hosts

=== Group B ===
Pos	Team	Pld	W	D	L	GF	GA	GD	Pts	Qualification	MN	UP	AS	HR	PJ
1	Manipur	4	4	0	0	17	0	+17	12	Advance to Knockout stage		4–0	6–0	3–0	4–0
2	Uttar Pradesh	4	3	0	1	5	4	+1	9	Advance to Knockout stage			1–0	2–0	2–0
3	Assam	4	2	0	2	4	9	−5	6					2–1	2–1
4	Haryana	4	1	0	3	8	10	−2	3						7–3
5	Punjab	4	0	0	4	4	11	−7	0						

Source: AIFF
Rules for classification: 1) points; 2) goal difference; 3) goals scored; 4) head-to-head result.

== Knockout stage ==
=== Bracket ===
Semi-finals
West Bengal	2
Uttar Pradesh	1
Manipur	4
Tamil Nadu	0

Final
West Bengal	0
Manipur	1

=== Semi-finals ===
13 October 2025	West Bengal	2–1	Uttar Pradesh	Narayanpur, Chhattisgarh
08:30 IST	Sulanjana 11'; Rimpa 45+2'	Report	Santosh 89' (pen.)	Stadium: Ramakrishna Mission Sports Complex; Attendance: 40; Referee: Ruba Devi G

13 October 2025	Manipur	4–0	Tamil Nadu	Narayanpur, Chhattisgarh
15:00 IST	Lynda 17', 21'; Dangmei 29' (pen.); Khumukcham 48'	Report		Stadium: Ramakrishna Mission Sports Complex; Attendance: 700; Referee: Pooja S

=== Final ===
15 October 2025	West Bengal	0–1	Manipur	Narayanpur, Chhattisgarh
15:00 IST		Report	Lynda 90+3'	Stadium: Ramakrishna Mission Sports Complex; Attendance: 1,000; Referee: Pooja S Player of the Match: Adrija Sarkhel (West Bengal)

== Top goalscorers ==
Rank	Player	Team	Goals
1	Shilji Shaji	Kerala	13
2	Sulanjana Raul	West Bengal	12
3	Lynda Kom Serto	Manipur	10
4	Priyadharshini	Tamil Nadu	9
5	Devamithra	Tamil Nadu	9

== See also ==
- 2025–26 Santosh Trophy
