= Ravi Kumar Punia =

Indian footballer (born 1993)

Ravi Punia
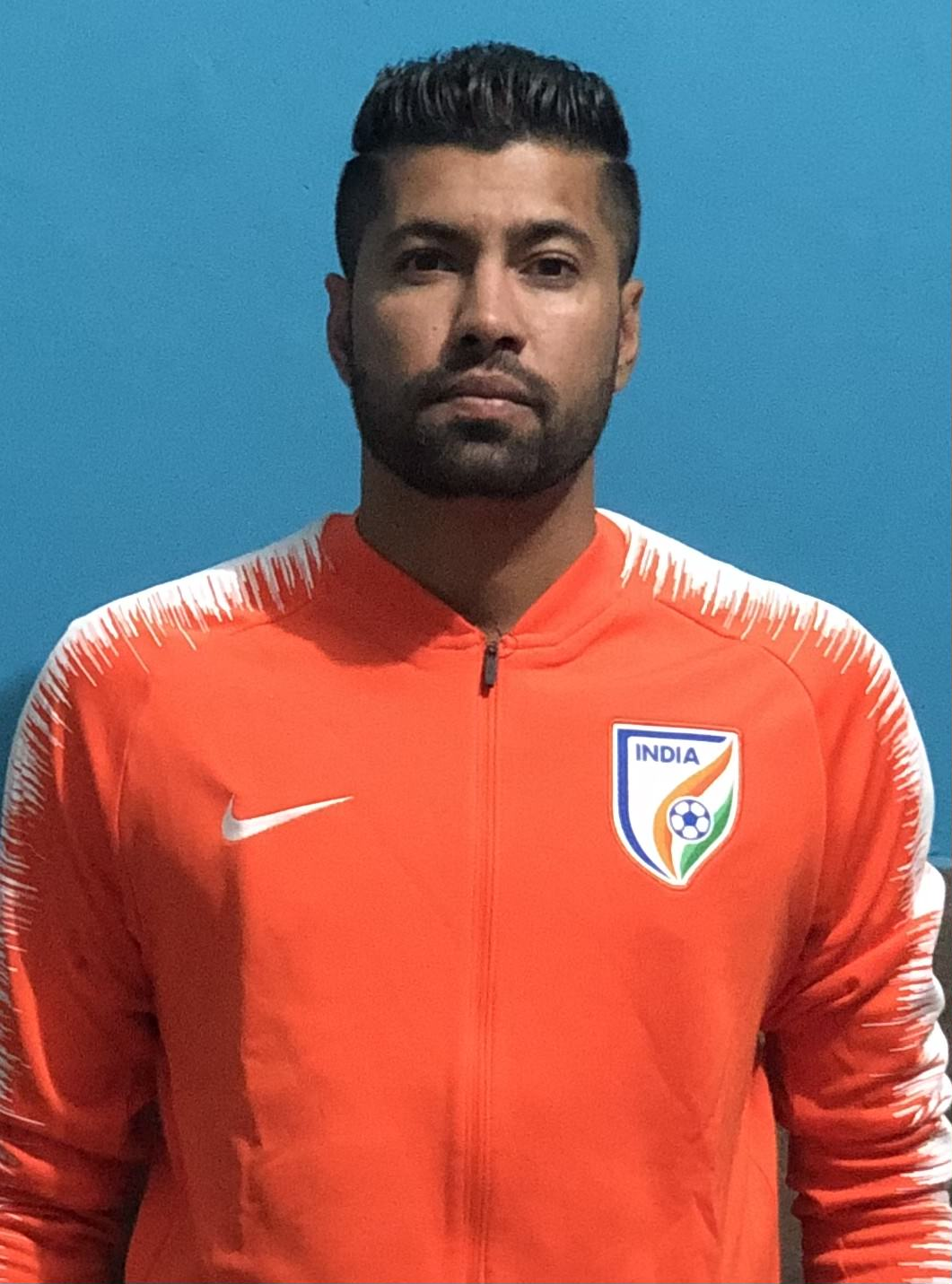
- Punia in November 2022

Personal information
- Full name: Ravi Kumar Punia
- Date of birth: 7 February 1993 (age 33)
- Place of birth: Charkhi Dadri, Haryana, India
- Height: 1.86 m (6 ft 1 in)
- Position: Centre-back

Team information
- Current team: Rajasthan United
- Number: 36

Senior career*
Years	Team	Apps	(Gls)
2016–2017	Bharat	8	(1)
2017–2018	Xavier's United FC	9	(0)
2018–2019	Mewar FC	1	(0)
2019–2020	Vijay FC	25	(9)
2021–2022	Rajasthan United	8	(0)
2022–2024	Jaipur United FC	5	(2)
2024–2025	ASL FC	1	(0)

Managerial career
- 2021–2022: Dadra and Nagar Haveli (W)
- 2021–2022: HOPS (W)
- 2022–2023: Haryana (W)
- 2022–2023: Rajasthan United (assistant)
- 2023–2024: HOPS (assistant)
- 2024–2025: Haryana (W)
- 2024–2025: Uttar Pradesh (W)
- 2026–: HOPS
- * Club domestic league appearances and goals

Ravi Kumar Punia (born 7 February 1993) also known as Ravi Punia, is an Indian professional footballer and India professional coach. He plays as a centre-back in the I-League and Santosh Trophy. He last played for Rajasthan United in the I-League and Haryana in the Santosh Trophy.

== Early and personal life ==
Born in Charkhi Dadri, Haryana, Punia went to Army Public School in Hisar, where he began playing football by representing the school team.

After his performances with Army Public School, he was selected to play for the district team of Hisar, and later represented the Haryana state team. While gaining experience playing in numerous states across India such as Haryana, Punjab, Gujarat, Rajasthan, Goa, West Bengal, and Maharashtra.

Punia is married to Sweta and the couple has a daughter named Myra. He is currently employed by the Ministry of Labour and Employment, Government of India.

== Playing statistics ==
As of May 2025.

Season	Team	League	Apps	Goals
2016–2017	Bharat	I-League	8	1
2017–2018	Xavier's United FC	Gujarat SFA Club Championship	9	0
2018–2019	Mewar FC	R-League A Division	1	0
2019–2020	Vijay FC	Jaipur League	25	9
2021–2022	Rajasthan United	I-League	8	0
2022–2024	Jaipur United FC	R-League A Division	5	2
2024–2025	ASL FC	R-League A Division	1	0
Total			57	12

== Managerial statistics ==
‘‘As of November 2026.’’

=== State Teams ===
Managerial record by state team
Team	Period	Matches	Wins	Draws	Losses	Win percentage
Dadra & Nagar Haveli	2021–2022	13	10	1	2	76.92%
Haryana	2022–2024	43	34	3	6	79.07%
Uttar Pradesh	2024–Present	21	15	2	4	71.43%
Total		77	59	6	12	76.62%

=== Club Teams ===
Managerial record by club
Club	Period	Matches	Wins	Draws	Losses	Win percentage
Rajasthan United	2020–2022	3	1	1	1	33.33%
HOPS	2022–Present	43	28	5	10	65.12%
Total		46	29	6	11	63.04%

== Club career ==
=== Bharat FC ===
Punia began his senior football career with Bharat FC, a Pune-based club that competed in the I-League. After progressing through the Pailan Arrows youth setup, he made his professional debut with Bharat FC in the I-League.

=== Xavier's United FC ===
In 2017, Punia joined Xavier's United, a Gujarat-based club. He spent two seasons with the team, competing in the Gujarat SFA Club Championship and establishing himself as a consistent performer at the state level.

=== Vijay FC ===
After recovering from a knee injury, Punia signed with Vijay FC, a local club in Jaipur. He played in the Jaipur League and was appointed captain during his stint.

=== Mewar FC ===
In the 2020–21 season, Punia made a single appearance for Mewar FC in the R-League A Division, representing the Rajasthan-based side.

=== Rajasthan United ===
Punia was one of the founding players of Rajasthan United FC, a club based in Jaipur. He represented the team in the R-League A Division, where they finished as runners-up in the 2021 edition held at Poornima University under a bio-secure format. The club later won the I-League Qualifiers in 2021 and secured promotion to the I-League for the 2021–22 season.

=== Jaipur United FC ===
In the 2022–23 season, Punia joined the newly formed Jaipur United FC. He was part of the club’s inaugural squad and helped the team achieve a runner-up finish in the R-League A Division.

=== ASL FC ===
In 2023, Punia signed with ASL FC, a Jaipur-based club. While continuing his coaching duties, he remained an active player during the 2023–24 and 2024–25 seasons, regularly featuring in the R-League A Division.

== Honours ==
=== Player ===
University of Rajasthan

- AIU All India Inter University Football Championship: 2016

Rajasthan United

- I-League Qualifiers: 2021

=== Manager ===
Dadra and Nagar Haveli

- Junior Girl's National Football Championship: 2022

Haryana

- Rajmata Jijabai Trophy runner-up: 2023–24
- Rajmata Jijabai Trophy third place (bronze medal): 2024–25

Uttar Pradesh

- Sub–Junior Girl's National Football Championship Tier 2: 2025
- Rajmata Jijabai Trophy third place (bronze medal): 2025–26
- Dr. Talimeren Ao Trophy runners-up (Tier 2): 2025–26

HOPS

- Indian Women's League 2: 2026
- AIFF U-17 Women’s Youth League:2026
- AIFF U-15 Women’s Youth League:2026runner-up:
