= Sub Junior Girls' National Football Championship =

Indian football tournament

Sub Junior Girls National Football Championship
- Founded: 2003; 23 years ago
- Region: India
- Teams: 29
- Current champions: Jharkhand (3rd title)
- Most championships: Manipur (6 titles)
- Website: Sub Junior Girl's NFC

The Sub Junior Girls' National Football Championship is an Indian football girls tournament held for under 17 players. The competition is held every year between the teams representing state associations of India under AIFF. The tournament was instituted by the AIFF in 2003 with the first edition held at Ooty in Tamil Nadu.

The latest edition held in 2019 at Cuttack was won by Jharkhand.

== Championship structure ==
The NFC structure was converted into a two tiered championship format from the 2023–24 season. The state associations are eligible to participate in the championship through the two tiers of the competition played across the country.

Sub Junior Girl's National Football Championship
Tier	Division
I	Sub Junior Girl's NFC Tier 1
II	Sub Junior Girl's NFC Tier 2

== Results ==
The following is the list of winners and runners-up:

=== Tier 1 ===
Season	Host	Winner	Score	Runner-up
2003–04	Ooty	Manipur	1–0	Orissa
2004–05	Tamil Nadu	Manipur	4–0	Orissa
2006–07	Chandigarh	Orissa	1–0	Manipur
2008–09	Uttarakhand	Manipur	2–0	Orissa
2009–10	Uttarakhand	Manipur	1–0	Orissa
2010–11	Uttarakhand	West Bengal	1–0	Orissa
2014–15	Cuttack	Mizoram	3–0	Haryana
2017–18	Manipur	Chandigarh	3–1	Manipur
2018–19	Cuttack	Manipur	2–1	Odisha
2019–20	Cuttack	Jharkhand	4–0	Arunachal Pradesh
2020–23	Not held			
2023–24	Ludhiana	Jharkhand	7–1	West Bengal
2024–25	Berhampore	Manipur	7–5	Jharkhand
2025–26	Jorhat	Jharkhand	3–2	Manipur

=== Tier 2 ===
Season	Host	Winner	Score	Runner-up
2023–24	Belgaum	Karnataka	7–2	Delhi
2024–25	Neemuch	Madhya Pradesh	2–1	Odisha
2025–26	Narayanpur	Uttar Pradesh	2–1	Kerala
