= Football at the National Games of India =

- Founded: Men: 1985; Women: 1999
- Region: India
- Current champions: M: Kerala; W: Haryana (2025)
- Most championships: M: Kerala, Punjab and West Bengal (3 titles each); W: Manipur (5 titles)
- 2025

Football has been a sport at the National Games of India since 1985, while the women's tournament was introduced in 1999. Kerala, Punjab, and West Bengal are currently the most successful states in the men's category with 3 gold medals, while Manipur is the most successful women's team with 5 gold medals

== Results ==
=== Men's tournament ===
Year	Host	Final			Third Place Match
Year	Host	(gold) Gold	Score	(silver) Silver	(bronze) Bronze	Score	Fourth Place
1985	Delhi	Punjab	−	West Bengal	−
1987	Kerala	Kerala	−	Punjab	Bihar	–
1994	Pune	West Bengal	−	Kerala	−
1997	Bangalore	Kerala	−	Goa	Karnataka	–
1999	Manipur	Maharashtra	−	Assam	West Bengal	–
2001	Punjab	Punjab	1−0	Goa	Maharashtra	1–0	Services
2002	Hyderabad	Punjab	2−1	West Bengal	Tamil Nadu	1–1 (5−4 p)	Services
2007	Guwahati	Assam	1−1 (6−5 p)	Tamil Nadu	Meghalaya	1–0	West Bengal
2011	Jharkhand	West Bengal	1−0	Punjab	Goa	3–1	Services
2015	Kerala	Mizoram	1−0	Punjab	Maharashtra	3–1	Goa
2022	Gujarat	West Bengal	5−0	Kerala	Services	4–0	Karnataka
2023	Goa	Services	3−1	Manipur	Kerala	0–0 (4–3 p)	Punjab
2025	Uttarakhand	Kerala	1−0	Uttarakhand	Delhi	2–1	Assam

=== Women's tournament ===
Year	Host	Final			Third Place Match
Year	Host	(gold) Gold	Score	(silver) Silver	(bronze) Bronze	Score	Fourth Place
1999	Manipur	Manipur	−	West Bengal	Kerala	–
2001	Punjab	Manipur	3−2	Punjab	West Bengal	3–1	Bihar
2002	Hyderabad	Manipur	1−0	West Bengal	Odisha	4–0	Andhra Pradesh
2007	Guwahati	Odisha	0−0 (4−2 p)	Manipur	West Bengal	2–1	Goa
2011	Jharkhand	Odisha	2−1	Manipur	West Bengal	1–0	Tamil Nadu
2015	Kerala	Manipur	1−1 (4−2 p)	Odisha	Haryana	2–0	Kerala
2022	Gujarat	Manipur	2−0	Odisha	Tamil Nadu	5–1	Assam
2023	Goa	Odisha	1−1 (4−2 p)	Manipur	Haryana	1–0	West Bengal
2025	Uttarakhand	Haryana	0−0 (4−2 p)	Odisha	West Bengal	2−2 (3−1 p)	Delhi

== Medal table ==
=== Men's ===
Team	Gold	Silver	Bronze
Punjab	3 (1985, 2001, 2003)	3 (1997, 2011, 2015)	0
West Bengal	3 (1994, 2011, 2022)	2 (1985, 2002)	1 (1999)
Kerala	3 (1987, 1997, 2025)	2 (1994, 2022)	1 (2023)
Assam	1 (2007)	1 (1999)	0
Maharashtra	1 (1999)	0	2 (2001, 2015)
Services	1 (2023)	0	1 (2022)
Mizoram	1 (2015)	0	0
Goa	0	2 (1997, 2001)	1 (2011)
Tamil Nadu	0	1 (2007)	1 (2002)
Manipur	0	1 (2023)	0
Uttarakhand	0	1 (2025)	0
Bihar	0	0	1 (1987)
Karnataka	0	0	1 (1997)
Meghalaya	0	0	1 (2007)
Delhi	0	0	1 (2025)

=== Women's ===
Team	Gold	Silver	Bronze
Manipur	5 (1999, 2001, 2002, 2015, 2022)	3 (2007, 2011, 2023)	0
Odisha	3 (2007, 2011, 2023)	3 (2015, 2022, 2025)	1 (2002)
Haryana	1 (2025)	0	2 (2015, 2023)
West Bengal	0	2 (1999, 2002)	4 (2001, 2007, 2011, 2025)
Punjab	0	1 (2001)	0
Kerala	0	0	1 (1999)
Tamil Nadu	0	0	1 (2022)

== See also ==
- Santosh Trophy
- Rajmata Jijabai Trophy
