= Dr. Talimeren Ao Trophy =

Indian football tournament

- Founded: 2001; 25 years ago
- Region: India
- Teams: 27
- Current champions: West Bengal (2nd title)
- Most championships: Manipur (12 titles)
- Broadcaster: SportsKPI (YouTube)
- Website: Junior Girl's NFC
- 2025–26

The Junior Girls' National Football Championship, also known as Dr. Talimeren Ao National Football Championship for Junior Girls since 2025, is an Indian football girls tournament held for under 19 players. The competition is held every year between the teams representing state associations of India under AIFF. The tournament was instituted by the AIFF in 2001 with the first edition held at Goa.

The 2019–20 edition held at Kolhapur was won by Himachal Pradesh. The latest edition held in 2022 as a Junior (U-17) championship at Guwahati was won by Dadra and Nagar Haveli.

== Championship structure ==
The NFC structure was converted into a two tiered championship format from the 2023–24 season. The state associations are eligible to participate in the championship through the two tiers of the competition played across the country.

Junior Girl's National Football Championship
Tier	Division
I	Junior Girl's NFC Tier 1
II	Junior Girl's NFC Tier 2

== Results ==
The following is the list of winners and runners-up:

=== Tier 1 ===
Season	Host	Winner	Score	Runner-up
2001–02	Goa	Goa	0–0 (4–2 p)	Manipur
2002–03	Assam	Manipur	8–0	Orissa
2003–04	Uttarakhand	Manipur	0–0, 1–0	West Bengal
2005–06	Orissa	Manipur	1–1 (4–2 p)	Orissa
2006–07	Pondicherry	Manipur	5–0	Tamil Nadu
2007–08	Tamil Nadu	Manipur	1–0	Orissa
2008–09	Haryana	Tamil Nadu	2–1	Orissa
2010–11	Chandigarh	Manipur	6–1	Haryana
2011–12	Uttarakhand	West Bengal	1–0	Orissa
2013–14	Odisha	Manipur	3–0	Odisha
2015–16	Goa	Manipur	5–0	Odisha
2017–18	Odisha	Manipur	3–2	Odisha
2018–19	Goa	Tamil Nadu	4–1	Manipur
2019–20	Maharashtra	Himachal Pradesh	3–1	Jharkhand
2020–22	Not held			
2022–23	Guwahati	Dadra & Nagar Haveli	1–0	Bihar
2023–24	Bhubaneswar	Manipur	1–0	Tamil Nadu
2024–25	Anantapur	Manipur	2–0	Jharkhand
2025–26	Anantapur	Manipur	9–0	West Bengal
2026–27	Anantapur	West Bengal	1–1 (3–2 p)	Manipur

=== Tier 2 ===
Season	Host	Winner	Score	Runner-up
2023–24	Jaipur	Goa	1–0	Andhra Pradesh
2024–25	Belgaum	Rajasthan	3–1	Karnataka
2025–26	Chümoukedima	Maharashtra	4–1	Uttar Pradesh
2026–27	Narayanpur	Assam	0–0 (3–2 p)	SAI
