= Fousiya Mampatta =

Indian footballer and athlete (1968–2021)

Personal information
- Full name: Fousiya Mampatta
- Date of birth: 1968
- Place of birth: Kozhikode, Kerala, India
- Date of death: 19 February 2021 (aged 52–53)
- Position: Goalkeeper

Senior career*
Years	Team	Apps	(Gls)
- Kerala

Managerial career
- 2005–2006: Kerala
- * Club domestic league appearances and goals

Fousiya Mampatta (1968 – 19 February 2021) was an Indian woman football player, coach, athlete and manager. She is one of the earliest female footballers from Kerala and was the first woman coach from the state. She had a coaching career for more than 17 years. Fousiya is considered as one of the women to promote footballing culture among the women in Kerala and was known as the Ambassador of Football in Malabar. Other than being a footballer and weightlifter, she was also a part of the hockey and volleyball team of Kerala.

== Early life and career ==
At first, she participated in weightlifting, before switching to other games. She had won a bronze medal in weightlifting at the South India championship. Fousiya was also a member of the district handball team and the field hockey team. She was also a participant in Judo and had won bronze medal at state level.

Fousiya played as a goalkeeper and represented Kerala at the National Games and the Junior Girls' National Football Championship.

== Coaching career ==
In 2003, she returned to Nadakkavu Government school, this time as a foot coach appointed by the Kerala sports council. In 2005, Fousiya coached the Kerala senior women's team which finished third in the national senior women's championship held in Manipur. In 2006, Kerala women's team coached under her finished as the runners-up in the senior national championship held in Odisha. In 2008, six of the players from Nadakkavu school became a part of Under-14 Kerala team. Among them, team captain Nikhila was later selected into the national team. In 2009, the number of players selected from Nadakkavu into the state team increased into seven out of which one was later selected into national team.

== Death ==
Fousiya was diagnosed with cancer in 2016. After struggling with the disease, she died on 19 February 2021.

=== Legacy ===
Fousiya is considered as one of the pioneers of women's football in Kerala. Her main mission was to promote not only football, but all the games among the women in the state. She is said to have played a major role in the inclusion of girls' football as a competitive item in the Kerala State school sports and games. In 2013, she made an attempt to include women's football in the state school games.

== Honours ==
=== Manager ===
Kerala

- Rajmata Jijabai Trophy runner-up: 2005–06
