= Dadra and Nagar Haveli and Daman and Diu Football Association =

State governing body of Football in Dadra and Nagar Haveli and Daman and Diu

- Sport: Football
- Jurisdiction: Dadra and Nagar Haveli and Daman and Diu
- Membership: 2 district associations
- Abbreviation: DNHDDFA
- Founded: 2022
- Affiliation: All India Football Federation (AIFF)
- Headquarters: Daman
- President: Amit Khemani
- Secretary: Walter Pereira

The Dadra and Nagar Haveli and Daman and Diu Football Association (DDFA) is the governing body of football in the union territory of Dadra and Nagar Haveli and Daman and Diu. It is affiliated with the All India Football Federation, the national governing body. It sends state teams for Santosh Trophy and Rajmata Jijabai Trophy.

== Affiliated district associations ==
=== Daman and Diu ===
Daman and Diu Football Association (DDFA) is the district governing body of football in the Daman and Diu districts.

=== Dadra and Nagar Haveli ===
Dadra and Nagar Haveli Football Association (DNHFA) is the district governing body of football in the Dadra and Nagar Haveli district.

== State teams ==
=== Men ===
- Dadra and Nagar Haveli and Daman and Diu football team
- Dadra and Nagar Haveli and Daman and Diu under-20 football team
- Dadra and Nagar Haveli and Daman and Diu under-15 football team
- Dadra and Nagar Haveli and Daman and Diu under-13 football team

=== Women ===
- Dadra and Nagar Haveli and Daman and Diu women's football team
- Dadra and Nagar Haveli and Daman and Diu women's under-19 football team
- Dadra and Nagar Haveli and Daman and Diu women's under-17 football team

== Affiliated district associations ==
The district associations affiliated with the Dadra and Nagar Haveli and Daman and Diu Football Association.

No.	Association	District(s)
1	Daman and Diu Football Association	Daman and Diu
2	Dadra and Nagar Haveli Football Association	Dadra and Nagar Haveli

== Competitions ==
=== Club level ===
==== Men's ====
- Dadra & Nagar Haveli and Daman & Diu Men's State League

== See also ==
- List of Indian state football associations
- Football in India
