= Daya Devi Heigrujam =

Indian footballer

Daya Devi
Personal information
- Full name: Daya Devi Heigrujam
- Date of birth: 4 April 2000 (age 26)
- Place of birth: Thoubal, Manipur, India
- Position: Winger

Team information
- Current team: Gokulam Kerala
- Number: 11

Senior career*
Years	Team	Apps	(Gls)
- KRYPHSA
- Manipur Police
- Gokulam Kerala
- The Young Welfare
2023–2024	Sethu		
2024–	Gokulam Kerala	10	(0)

International career
- India U16
2018	India U19	3	(1)
2019–	India	8	(0)
- * Club domestic league appearances and goals

Daya Devi Heigrujam (Meitei: Heigrujam Daya Devi, born 4 April 2000) is an Indian professional footballer who plays as a winger for the Indian Women's League club Gokulam Kerala and the India national football team. She has also represented Sethu.

== Honours ==
India

- South Asian Games Gold medal: 2019

Manipur

- Rajmata Jijabai Trophy: 2019–20, 2023–24
