= Roshini Devi Okram =

Indian footballer

Roshini Devi
Personal information
- Full name: Roshini Devi Okram
- Date of birth: 8 February 1994 (age 32)
- Place of birth: Manipur, India
- Position: Goalkeeper

Senior career*
Years	Team	Apps	(Gls)
- KRYPHSA
- Manipur Police

International career
2010–2016	India	7	(0)
- * Club domestic league appearances and goals

Roshini Devi Okram (Meitei: Okram Roshini Devi, born 8 February 1994 in Manipur) is an Indian women's footballer who plays as a goalkeeper for the Manipur Police. She also played internationally for the India national football team.

== Playing career ==
Devi represented India at the 2010, and 2014 SAFF Women's Championship tournaments.

== Honours ==
India

- SAFF Women's Championship: 2010, 2014
- South Asian Games Gold medal: 2016

Manipur

- Rajmata Jijabai Trophy: 2019–20, 2021–22
