= Rinaroy Devi Salam =

Indian footballer

Rinaroy Devi
Personal information
- Full name: Rinaroy Devi Salam
- Date of birth: 5 February 1993 (age 33)
- Place of birth: Leikai, Manipur, India
- Position: Forward

Team information
- Current team: Eastern Sporting Union
- Number: 33

Senior career*
Years	Team	Apps	(Gls)
- Manipur Police
- TRAU
- United Warriors SC
- Eastern Sporting Union
- The Young Welfare Club
2023–	Eastern Sporting Union		

International career^{‡}
2012–2016	India		
- * Club domestic league appearances and goals ‡ National team caps and goals as of 25 May 2013

Rinaroy Devi Salam (Meitei: Salam Rinaroy Devi, born 5 February 1993) is an Indian footballer who plays as a forward for Eastern Sporting Union. She has been a member of the India women's national team.

== Honours ==
India

- SAFF Women's Championship: 2012, 2016

Manipur

- Rajmata Jijabai Trophy: 2019–20, 2021–22
- National Games Gold medal: 2022
