= 2018–19 Senior Women's National Football Championship =

2018–19 Women's National Football Championship
Tournament details
- Country: India
- Dates: 18 September – 1 October 2018
- Teams: 27

Final positions
- Champions: Manipur (19th title)
- Runners-up: Odisha

The 2018–19 Senior Women's National Football Championship is the 24th edition of the Senior Women's National Football Championship, the premier competition in India for women's teams representing regional and state football associations.

Tamil Nadu are currently the defending champions, having defeated Manipur in the final during the 2017–18 edition of the tournament. The tournament is being hosted in Odisha and is running from 18 September to 1 October 2018 at the Barabati Stadium.

Manipur won the championship beating Odisha 2–1 in the final.

== Format ==
The 27 teams in the tournament are split into 8 groups of 3–4 teams each. On 27 September, there will be four quarter-final matches and on 29 September there will be two semi-final matches. The Final itself will occur on 1 October.

=== Round dates ===
The schedule will be follows.

Round	Match dates
Group stage	18 September – 25 September 2018
Quarter-finals	27 September 2018
Semi-finals	29 September 2018
Final	1 October 2018

== Group stage ==
=== Group A ===
Pos	Team	Pld	W	D	L	GF	GA	GD	Pts	Qualification
1	Haryana	2	2	0	0	23	0	+23	6	Advance to Quarter-finals
2	Karnataka	2	0	1	1	2	12	−10	1	
3	Uttar Pradesh	2	0	1	1	2	15	−13	1	

Source: All India Football Federation
Rules for classification: 1) points; 2) goal difference; 3) goals scored; 4) head-to-head result.

18 September 2018	Haryana	10-0	Karnataka	Cuttack
				Stadium: Barabati Stadium

20 September 2018	Karnataka	2–2	Uttar Pradesh	Cuttack
				Stadium: Barabati Stadium

22 September 2018	Uttar Pradesh	0–13	Haryana	Cuttack
				Stadium: Barabati Stadium

== Final ==
1 October 2018	Manipur	2–1	Odisha	Cuttack
	Bala Devi 45'; Prameshwori Devi 50'	Report	Arati Sethi 81'	Stadium: Barabati Stadium
