= Uttar Pradesh Football Sangh =

State governing body of association football in Uttar Pradesh, India

- उत्तर प्रदेश फुटबॉल संघ
- Sport: Football
- Jurisdiction: Uttar Pradesh
- Abbreviation: UPFS
- Affiliation: All India Football Federation (AIFF)
- Headquarters: Varanasi
- President: Arvind Menon
- Secretary: Mohd Shahid

The Uttar Pradesh Football Sangh (abbr: UPFS) is the governing body of football in the Indian state of Uttar Pradesh. It operates the Uttar Pradesh football team. It is affiliated with the All India Football Federation. The UPFS sends state teams for Santosh Trophy and Rajmata Jijabai Trophy.

== State teams ==
=== Men ===
- Uttar Pradesh football team
- Uttar Pradesh under-20 football team
- Uttar Pradesh under-15 football team
- Uttar Pradesh under-13 football team

=== Women ===
- Uttar Pradesh women's football team
- Uttar Pradesh women's under-19 football team
- Uttar Pradesh women's under-17 football team

== Competitions ==
=== Men's ===
- Lucknow Super Division
- Ghaziabad District League
- Baghpat District League
- Uttar Pradesh Football Sangh League

== See also ==
- List of Indian state football associations
- Football in India
