= GSFA =

GSFA may refer to:

- Global South Fellowship of Anglican Churches, a Christian organization
- Gujarat State Football Association, a sports governing body in India
