= Haryana Football Association =

State governing body of Football in Haryana

- Sport: Football
- Jurisdiction: Haryana
- Membership: 22 district associations
- Abbreviation: HFA
- Affiliation: All India Football Federation (AIFF)
- Headquarters: Gurgaon, Haryana
- President: Suraj Pal Amu
- Secretary: Shaffali Nagal

The Haryana Football Association (HFA) is the governing body of football in Haryana, India. It is affiliated with the All India Football Federation, the national governing body. It sends state teams for Santosh Trophy and Rajmata Jijabai Trophy.

== State teams ==
=== Men ===
- Haryana football team
- Haryana under-20 football team
- Haryana under-15 football team
- Haryana under-13 football team

=== Women ===
- Haryana women's football team
- Haryana women's under-19 football team
- Haryana women's under-17 football team

== Affiliated district associations ==
All 22 districts of Haryana are affiliated with the Haryana Football Association.

No.	Association	District	President
1	Ambala District Football Association	Ambala	
2	Bhiwani District Football Association	Bhiwani	
3	Charkhi Dadri District Football Association	Charkhi Dadri	
4	Faridabad District Football Association	Faridabad	
5	Fatehabad District Football Association	Fatehabad	
6	Gurgaon District Football Association	Gurgaon	
7	Hisar District Football Association	Hisar	
8	Jhajjar District Football Association	Jhajjar	
9	Jind District Football Association	Jind	
10	Kaithal District Football Association	Kaithal	
11	Karnal District Football Association	Karnal	
12	Kurukshetra District Football Association	Kurukshetra	
13	Mahendragarh District Football Association	Mahendragarh	
14	Nuh District Football Association	Nuh	
15	Palwal District Football Association	Palwal	
16	Panchkula District Football Association	Panchkula	
17	Panipat District Football Association	Panipat	
18	Rewari District Football Association	Rewari	
19	Rohtak District Football Association	Rohtak	
20	Sirsa District Football Association	Sirsa	
21	Sonipat District Football Association	Sonipat	
22	Yamunanagar District Football Association	Yamunanagar	

== Competitions ==
=== Club level ===
==== Men's senior ====
- Haryana Men's Football League

==== Women's senior ====
- Haryana Women's Football League

== See also ==
- List of Indian state football associations
- Football in India
