= Lakshadweep Football Association =

State governing body of association football in Lakshadweep

- Sport: Football
- Jurisdiction: Lakshadweep
- Abbreviation: LFA
- Founded: 2016; 9 years ago
- Affiliation: All India Football Federation (AIFF)
- Headquarters: Kavaratti
- President: K. Mohammed Ali
- Secretary: K. I. Nizamuddin

The Lakshadweep Football Association (LFA) is the governing body of football in Lakshadweep, India. It is affiliated with the All India Football Federation, the national governing body. It sends state teams for Santosh Trophy and Rajmata Jijabai Trophy.

== State teams ==
=== Men ===
- Lakshadweep football team
- Lakshadweep under-20 football team
- Lakshadweep under-15 football team
- Lakshadweep under-13 football team

=== Women ===
- Lakshadweep women's football team
- Lakshadweep women's under-19 football team
- Lakshadweep women's under-17 football team

== Competitions ==
=== Men's ===
- Kavaratti Football League

== See also ==
- List of Indian state football associations
- Football in India
