= A.R. Khaleel =

Indian football administrator (1932–2023)

A.R. Khaleel (4 April 1932 – 10 May 2023) was an Indian football administrator who served as the vice president, treasurer and executive committee member of the All India Football Federation. He also served as the president of the Karnataka State Football Association for 28 years from 1989 to 2018 making him the longest serving president of the association.

== Early life and education ==
Khaleel was born on 4 April 1932. He attended Bishop Cotton Boys' School, Bangalore. He was a decorated Mysore state football player before entering football administration by taking over Jawahar Union FC, then a top division club in Bangalore.

== Career ==
Khaleel became a member of the Bangalore District Football Association in 1953, served as treasurer of Karnataka State Football Association from 1961 to 1981 and later became vice president from 1981 to 89. Following which he became KSFA's 15th and longest serving president for 28 years until 2018.

Khaleel was part of the AIFF Executive Committee and held various posts in the AIFF including Treasurer and Vice President till 2018. He was also a member of the Asian Football Confederation Standing Committees on multiple occasions. He also served as the I-league chairman in 2013.

Khaleel was instrumental in co-hosting the AFC Youth Championships at the Sree Kanteerava Stadium in 2006 in Bangalore. Many national tournaments like the Federation Cup and BC Roy trophy were held in Karnataka after Khaleel pushed the AIFF for host status and he also got the FIFA goal project to start a FIFA academy and an artificial turf at the Football Stadium.

He ran Jawahar Union FC, one of Bengaluru's oldest clubs.

== Death ==
Khaleel died on 10 May 2023 at the age of 91 years following a brief illness.

== Legacy ==
Khaleel was an eminent figure in Indian football circles serving in State and National football bodies in various capacities.

Former AIFF President, Praful Patel remembered Khaleel by stating, "He was doyen of football in Karnataka and the country. Over the last many decades, his contributions and commitment to KSFA and Indian football will always be remembered and cherished". KSFA President NA Haris said, “Khaleel sab had rendered yeoman service to football at the national, state and district levels. He was a passionate football lover, former player, owned one of The city’s famous football clubs Jawahar Union FC and an astute administrator".
