= Mizoram women's football team =

Mizoram
- Full name: Mizoram women's football team
- Ground: Rajiv Gandhi Stadium, Aizawl
- Owner: Mizoram Football Association
- Head coach: B. Malsawmzuala
- League: Rajmata Jijabai Trophy
- 2025–26: First round
Home colours	Away colours

The Mizoram women's football team is an Indian women's football team representing Mizoram in the Senior Women's National Football Championship.

== History ==
They made their maiden Senior Women's National Football Championship semi-final appearance at the 2021–22 edition against the eventual runners-up Railways, but lost in the penalty shootout.

Mizoram's sub-junior team were the champions of the National Sub-Junior Girls’ Football tournament held in 2015 held at Cuttack.

== Honours ==
=== State (youth) ===
- Sub–Junior Girl's National Football Championship
  - Winners (1): 2014–15
