= Railways women's football team =

Indian women's football club

Railways
- Full name: Railways women's football team
- Ground: Karnail Singh Stadium
- Capacity: 5,000
- Owner(s): Railways Sports Promotion Board; Indian Railways
- Head coach: Tapan Chakraborty
- League: Rajmata Jijabai Trophy
- 2025–26: First round
Home colours	Away colours

The Railways women's football team is the football section representing the Indian Railways in domestic competitions, most notably the Senior Women's National Football Championship. They have appeared in its finals four times, and have won the trophy once. They won their maiden championship title at the 2015–16 edition, defeating the reigning champions Manipur in the penalty shootout.

== Squad ==
As per 2024–25 group stages of Senior Women's National Football Championship.

1. Anju
2. Yumnam
3. Jabamani Tudu
4. Mamta
5. Sanju Yadav
6. Kunti
7. Manisha
8. Ashalata
9. Supriya
10. Ravina
11. Rashmi(GK)
12. Sasmita Swain
13. Janjali Sahu
14. Lochana Munda
15. Laharee Mangaraj
16. Madhsmita Barick
17. Shilpi Tiwari
18. Tara Khatoon
19. Dipanita Dey
20. Sangita Das
21. Deepa
22. Kabita Wari

Coach : Tapan Chakraborty

== Honours ==
=== State ===
- Rajmata Jijabai Trophy (Senior Women's NFC)
  - Winners (1): 2015–16
  - Runners-up (3): 2016–17, 2019–20, 2021–22

== See also ==
- Railways football team
