= Punjab women's football team =

Punjab
- Full name: Punjab women's football team
- Ground: Various
- Owner: Punjab Football Association
- Head coach: Hardeep Singh
- League: Rajmata Jijabai Trophy
- 2025–26: Final round
Home colours	Away colours	Third colours

The Punjab women's football team is an Indian women's football team representing Punjab in the Senior Women's National Football Championship.

== History ==
They were the silver medalists in their only senior major final appearance at the national level at the 2001 National Games held at Punjab.

While they have qualified for the quarterfinal group stages and final rounds of the Senior Women's National Football Championship multiple times, their best performance at the nationals was the quarter-final appearance at the 2018–19 edition.

== Honours ==
=== State (senior) ===
- National Games
  - Silver medal (1): 2001
