= List of Indian state football associations =

The state football associations are the regional governing bodies of football in India. There are 36 state associations and 2 affiliates associations to the All India Football Federation.

The state associations have their own constitutions and structure. Depending on the size of the state, some associations have affiliated sub-district associations. Each state conducts its own competitions, while the local sub-associations organise lower tier leagues.

== Member associations ==
=== Full members ===
No.	Association	State/UT	President	Zone
1	All Manipur Football Association	Manipur	M. Ratan Kumar Singh	North East
2	Andaman and Nicobar Football Association	Andaman and Nicobar Islands	Vidya Prakash Krishna	South
3	Andhra Pradesh Football Association	Andhra Pradesh	Kotagiri Sridhar	South
4	Arunachal Pradesh Football Association	Arunachal Pradesh	Pema Khandu	North East
5	Assam Football Association	Assam	Naba Kumar Doley	North East
6	Bihar Football Association	Bihar	Prasenjeet Mehta	East
7	Chandigarh Football Association	Chandigarh	K. P. Singh	North
8	Chhattisgarh Football Association	Chhattisgarh	Ajay Chandrakar	East
9	Dadra & Nagar Haveli and Daman & Diu Football Association	Dadra & Nagar Haveli and Daman & Diu	Amit Khemani	West
10	Delhi Soccer Association (Football Delhi)	Delhi	Anuj Gupta	North
11	Football Association of Odisha	Odisha	Tankadhar Tripathy	East
12	Goa Football Association	Goa	Valanka Alemao	West
13	Gujarat State Football Association	Gujarat	Parimal Nathwani	West
14	Haryana Football Association	Haryana	Suraj Pal	North
15	Himachal Pradesh Football Association	Himachal Pradesh	Baldev Singh Tomar	North
16	Indian Football Association	West Bengal	Ajit Banerjee	East
17	Jammu and Kashmir Football Association	Jammu and Kashmir	Wasim Aslam	North
18	Jharkhand Football Association	Jharkhand	Mithlesh Kumar Thakur	East
19	Karnataka State Football Association	Karnataka	N. A. Haris	South
20	Kerala Football Association	Kerala	Tom Jose	South
21	Ladakh Football Association	Ladakh	Tashi Namgail	North
22	Lakshadweep Football Association	Lakshadweep	K. Mohammed Ali	West
23	Madhya Pradesh Football Association	Madhya Pradesh	Trilok Chand Kochar	West
24	Meghalaya Football Association	Meghalaya	Larsing Ming Sawyan	North East
25	Mizoram Football Association	Mizoram	Lal Thanzara	North East
26	Nagaland Football Association	Nagaland	Neibou Sekhose	North East
27	Pondicherry Football Association	Puducherry	D. Nestor	South
28	Punjab Football Association	Punjab	Samir Thapar	North
29	Rajasthan Football Association	Rajasthan	Manvendra Singh	West
30	Sikkim Football Association	Sikkim	Menla Ethenpa	East
31	Tamil Nadu Football Association	Tamil Nadu	Jesiah Villavarayar	South
32	Telangana Football Association	Telangana	Mohammed Ali Rafath	South
33	Tripura Football Association	Tripura	Ratan Saha	North East
34	Uttar Pradesh Football Sangh	Uttar Pradesh	Arvind Menon	North
35	Uttarakhand State Football Association	Uttarakhand	Amandeep Sandhu	North
36	Western India Football Association	Maharashtra	Praful Patel	West

=== Affiliate members ===
No.	Association	Department	President
1	Railways Sports Promotion Board	Indian Railways	D. K. Gayen
2	Services Sports Control Board	Indian Armed Forces	Dinesh Suri

== Inter-state associations competitions ==
The National Football Championships are inter-state knock-out competitions contested among the regional state associations and government institutions under the All India Football Federation, national governing body. Currently six (3 men's & 3 women's) championship competitions are held for age different groups.

=== Men's & boys ===
- Senior NFC (Santosh Trophy)
- U20 National Football Championship (Swami Vivekananda NFC)
- Junior NFC (B. C. Roy Trophy) (Under-19)
- Sub-Junior NFC (Mir Iqbal Hussain Trophy) (Under-16)

=== Women's & girls ===
- Senior Women's NFC (Rajmata Jijabai Trophy)
- Junior Girls' NFC (Dr. Talimeren Ao Trophy) (Under-19)
- Sub-Junior Girls' NFC (Under-17)

=== Other ===
- National Beach Soccer Championship

== See also ==
- List of member associations of the BCCI
