= Himachal Pradesh women's football team =

Himachal Pradesh
- Full name: Himachal Pradesh women's football team
- Ground: Various
- Owner: Himachal Pradesh Football Association
- Head coach: Renjeev Kumar Krishnankutty
- League: Rajmata Jijabai Trophy
- 2025–26: First round
Home colours	Away colours

The Himachal Pradesh women's football team is an Indian women's football team representing Himachal Pradesh in the Senior Women's National Football Championship. Their best performance at the Senior Women's National Football Championship was the quarter-final appearance at the 2019–20 edition.

Himachal Pradesh's junior team were the champions of the National Junior Girls' Football tournament 2019–20 held at Kolhapur.

== Honours ==
=== State (youth) ===
- Junior Girl's National Football Championship
  - Winners (1): 2019–20
