= Andaman and Nicobar Football Association =

State governing body of Football in Andaman and Nicobar

- ANFA
- Sport: Football
- Category: Football
- Jurisdiction: Andaman and Nicobar Islands
- Abbreviation: ANFA
- Affiliation: All India Football Federation (AIFF)
- Headquarters: Sri Vijaya Puram
- President: Sanjay Meshack

The Andaman and Nicobar Football Association (ANFA) is the state governing body of football in the Indian union territory of Andaman and Nicobar Islands. It is affiliated with the All India Football Federation, the national governing body. It sends state teams for Santosh Trophy and Rajmata Jijabai Trophy.

== State teams ==
=== Men ===
- Andaman and Nicobar football team
- Andaman and Nicobar under-20 football team
- Andaman and Nicobar under-16 football team
- Andaman and Nicobar under-14 football team
- Andaman and Nicobar Beach Soccer team

=== Women ===
- Andaman and Nicobar women's football team
- Andaman and Nicobar women's under-16 football team
- Andaman and Nicobar women's under-14 football team

== Affiliated district associations ==
All 3 districts of Andaman and Nicobar Islands are affiliated with the Andaman and Nicobar Football Association.

No.	Association	District	President
1	NA	Nicobar	
2	NA	North and Middle Andaman	
3	NA	South Andaman	

== See also ==
- List of Indian state football associations
- Football in India
