= Dadra and Nagar Haveli and Daman and Diu women's football team =

Dadra and Nagar Haveli and Daman and Diu
- Full name: Dadra and Nagar Haveli and Daman and Diu women's football team
- League: Rajmata Jijabai Trophy

The Dadra and Nagar Haveli and Daman and Diu women's football team is an Indian football team representing the union territory of Dadra and Nagar Haveli and Daman and Diu in the Senior Women's National Football Championship. The Dadra and Nagar Haveli and Daman and Diu women's football teams participated in the national competitions until they were merged in the 2022–23 Indian football season and will make its senior national debut in the 2022–23 edition.

Their U-17 junior team became the champions of the National Junior (U-17) Girls’ Football tournament 2022–23 held at Guwahati. The state footballers mostly consist of players from Haryana and Delhi.

== Honours ==
=== State (youth) ===
as Dadra and Nagar Haveli

- Junior Girl's National Football Championship
  - Winners (1): 2022–23
