= Chhattisgarh women's football team =

Chhattisgarh
- Full name: Chhattisgarh women's football team
- Ground: Various
- Owner: Chhattisgarh Football Association
- League: Rajmata Jijabai Trophy
- 2025–26: Final round
Home colours	Away colours

The Chhattisgarh women's football team is an Indian women's football team representing Chhattisgarh in the Senior Women's National Football Championship.

== See also ==
- List of Indian state football associations
- Football in India
