= Arunachal Pradesh women's football team =

Arunachal Pradesh
- Full name: Arunachal Pradesh women's football team
- Ground: Various
- Owner: Arunachal Pradesh Football Association
- Head coach: Kipa Bharat
- League: Rajmata Jijabai Trophy
- 2025–26: First round
Home colours	Away colours

The Arunachal Pradesh women's football team is an Indian women's football team representing Arunachal Pradesh in the Senior Women's National Football Championship. Their best performance at the Senior Women's National Football Championship was the quarter-final appearance at the 2019–20 edition.

Arunachal Pradesh's sub-junior team were the runners-up of the National Sub-Junior Girls’ Football tournament 2019–20 held at Cuttack.

== Honours ==
=== State (youth) ===
- Sub–Junior Girl's National Football Championship
  - Runners-up (1): 2019–20
