= Ladakh Football Association =

Governing body of association football in Ladakh, India

- Sport: Football
- Jurisdiction: Ladakh
- Membership: 7 district associations
- Abbreviation: LFA
- Founded: 2019; 7 years ago
- Affiliation: All India Football Federation (AIFF)
- Headquarters: Leh
- President: Tashi Namgail
- Secretary: Tsering Angmo

The Ladakh Football Association (LFA) is the football governing body in Ladakh, India. It is affiliated with the All India Football Federation, the national governing body. It sends state teams for Santosh Trophy and Rajmata Jijabai Trophy.

== State teams ==
=== Men ===
- Ladakh football team
- Ladakh under-20 football team
- Ladakh under-15 football team
- Ladakh under-13 football team

=== Women ===
- Ladakh women's football team
- Ladakh women's under-19 football team
- Ladakh women's under-17 football team

== Affiliated district associations ==
The 2 districts of Ladakh are affiliated with the Ladakh Football Association.

No.	Association	District
1	Kargil District Football Association	Kargil
2	Leh District Football Association	Leh

== Competitions ==
=== Men's ===
- Leh District Football League
- Kargil District Football League

=== Women's ===
- Ladakh Women's Football Premier League

== See also ==
- 1 Ladakh FC
- Football in India
- List of Indian state football associations
