= Odisha women's football team =

Odisha
- Full name: Odisha women's football team
- Nickname: ଓଡ଼ିଶା ମହିଳା ଫୁଟବଲ ଟୀମ୍
- Ground: Kalinga Stadium
- Capacity: 15,000
- Owner: Football Association of Odisha
- President: Tankadhar Tripathy
- Head coach: Gitanjali Khuntia
- League: Rajmata Jijabai Trophy
- 2025–26: Final Round
Home colours	Away colours	Third colours

The Odisha women's football team (Odia: ଓଡ଼ିଶା ମହିଳା ଫୁଟବଲ ଟୀମ୍), earlier the Orissa women's football team, is an Indian women's football team representing the state of Odisha, India. The Football Association of Odisha, a state association of All India Football Federation, manages the team. The team competes as a member of the All India Football Federation, in the Senior Women's National Football Championship, the topmost women's knock-out league of Indian football.

== Stadium ==
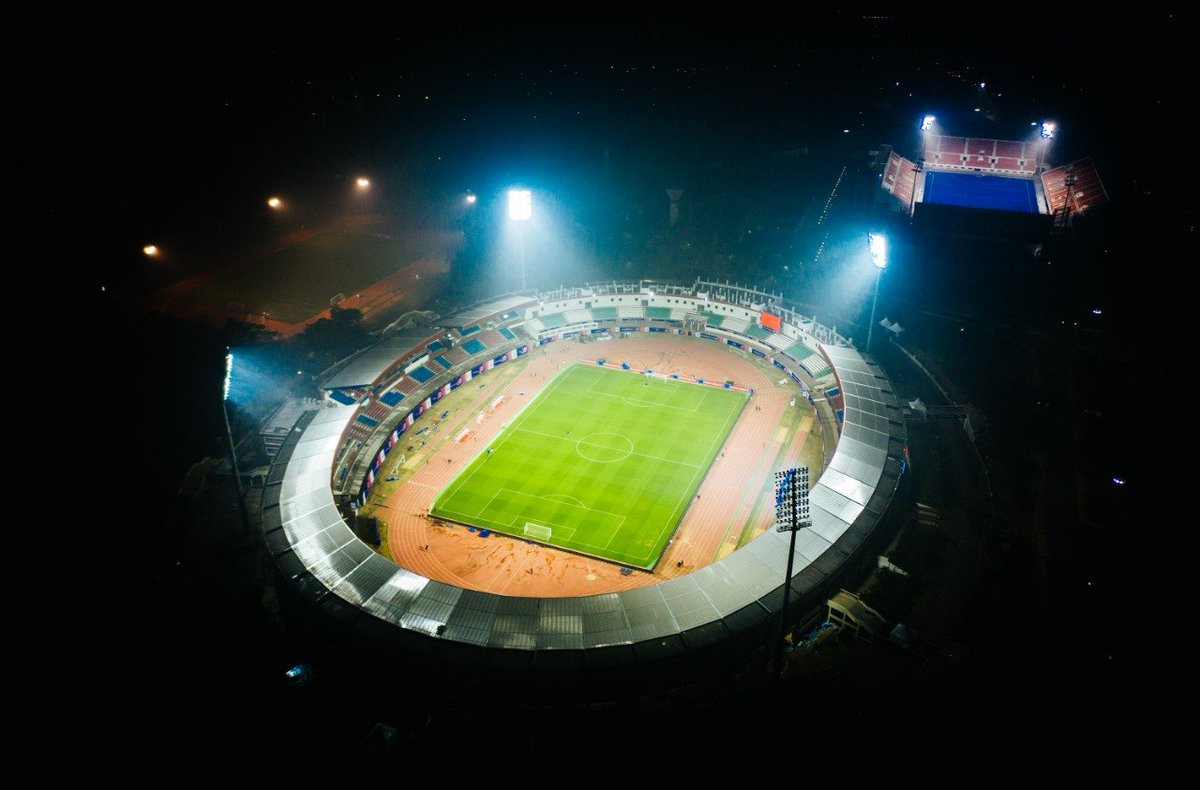
An elevated view of the Kalinga Stadium in 2019

Established in 1978, the Kalinga Stadium in Bhubaneswar, serves as the home ground of Odisha. The 15,000-capacity stadium has hosted several national and international tournaments including the I-League, Super Cup, and 2019 Gold Cup. It was one of the venues for the 2022 FIFA U-17 Women's World Cup. The stadium is also the home base for the national and youth team camps. Indian Arrows, AIFF's developmental side, is also based at the Kalinga Stadium.

== Personnel ==
Position	Name
Head Coach	(India) Gitanjali Khuntia
Assistant Coach/Team Manager	(India) Gayatri Mallick
Physiotherapist	(India) Lopamudra Maharaj

== Players ==
=== Current squad ===
As of 23 October 2024

The following 22 players were called up for the 2024–25 Rajmata Jijabai Trophy.

Note: Flags indicate national team as defined under FIFA eligibility rules; some limited exceptions apply. Players may hold more than one non-FIFA nationality.

No.	Pos.	Nation	Player
1	GK	IND	Susmita Pun
2	DF	IND	Ambruta Nayak
3	DF	IND	Sradhanjali Panda
4	DF	IND	Sulekha Kanhar
5	DF	IND	Pragyan Kishan
6	MF	IND	Priyasa Sarkar
7	MF	IND	Munica Minz
8	MF	IND	Janhabi Kishan
9	FW	IND	Manisha Naik
10	FW	IND	Pyari Xaxa (C)
11	FW	IND	Deepa Nayak

No.	Pos.	Nation	Player
12	FW	IND	Malati Munda
14	MF	IND	Shibani Mundari
15	FW	IND	Pratima Oram
16	FW	IND	Laxmi Priya Lenka
17	FW	IND	Subhadra Sahoo
18	FW	IND	Satyabati Khadia
19	FW	IND	Rupashree Munda
20	DF	IND	Subasini Saha
21	GK	IND	Manju Ganjhu
22	DF	IND	Ranee Bag
24	MF	IND	Ipshita Rout

== Management ==
=== Board of directors ===
Position	Name
President	(India) Tankadhar Tripathy
Vice President	(India) Bijay Das
Vice President	(India) Dilip Kumar Sahoo
Vice President	(India) Hrudaya Ranjan Behera
Honorary Secretary	(India) Asirbad Behera
Joint Secretary	(India) Avijit Paul
Joint Secretary	(India) Biswa Ranjan Gharei
Joint Secretary	(India) Sangeeta Sharma
Treasurer	(India) Bhakta Ballav Das
Head of Referees	(India) Durga Madhab Naik
Golden Baby League Development Officer	(India) Subhasis Behera

== Honours ==
=== State (senior) ===
- Rajmata Jijabai Trophy (Senior Women's NFC)

(gold) Winners (1): 2010–11
(silver) Runners-up (6): 2001–02, 2007–08, 2009–10, 2013–14, 2018–19, 2024–25

- National Games

(gold) Gold medal (3): 2007, 2011, 2023
(silver) Silver medal (3): 2015, 2022, 2025
(bronze) Bronze medal (1): 2002

=== State (youth) ===
- Junior Girl's National Football Championship

(silver) Runners-up (8): 2002–03, 2005–06, 2007–08, 2008–09, 2011–12, 2013–14, 2015–16, 2017–18

- Sub–Junior Girl's National Football Championship

(gold) Winners (1): 2006–07
(silver) Runners-up (7): 2003–04, 2004–05, 2007–08, 2008–09, 2009–10, 2010–11, 2018–19

=== Others ===
- Pem Dorjee Memorial Cup

(silver) Runners-up: 2009

== Notable players ==
Below the players, are Indian senior international women's footballers who represented the Odisha women's football team.

- Sradhanjali Samantaray
- Ranjita Mohanty
- Pinky Bompal Magar
- Gitanjali Khuntia
- Sasmita Mallik
- Prasanti Pradhan
- Alochana Senapati
- Gayatri Mallick
- Supriya Routray
- Sita Sharma
- Suprava Samal
- Rashmita Patra
- Lochana Munda
- Swarnamayee Samal
- Bijayalaxmi Sahoo
- Tikina Samal
- Manisa Panna
- Pyari Xaxa
- Jabamani Tudu
- Juli Kishan

== See also ==
- Odisha FC
- Odisha FC Women
- Odisha football team
- Odisha Women's League
- Football Association of Odisha
