= Haryana women's football team =

Haryana
- Full name: Haryana women's football team
- Ground: Various
- Owner: Haryana Football Association
- Head coach: Ravi Kumar Punia
- League: Rajmata Jijabai Trophy
- 2025–26: Final round
Home colours	Away colours

The Haryana women's football team is an Indian women's football team representing Haryana in the Senior Women's National Football Championship. They reached the semi-finals at the 2015–16 Senior Women's National Football Championship held at Jabalpur before losing to the eventual runners-up Manipur.

Haryana's junior team were the runners-up of the National Junior Girls’ Football tournament 2010–11 held at Chandigarh while, their sub-junior team were the runners-up of the National Sub-Junior Girls’ Football tournament 2014–15 held at Cuttack.

== Honours ==
=== State (senior) ===
- Rajmata Jijabai Trophy (Senior Women's NFC)
  - Runners-up (2): 2022–23, 2023–24
- National Games
  - Gold medal (1): 2025
  - Bronze medal (2): 2015, 2023

=== State (youth) ===
- Junior Girl's National Football Championship
  - Runners-up (1): 2010–11
- Sub–Junior Girl's National Football Championship
  - Runners-up (1): 2014–15
