= West Bengal women's football team =

State football team representing West Bengal of India

West Bengal
- Full name: West Bengal women's football team
- Ground: Salt Lake Stadium
- Capacity: 68,000
- Owner: Indian Football Association (West Bengal)
- Head coach: Dola Mukherjee
- League: Rajmata Jijabai Trophy
- 2025–26: Runners-up
Home colours	Away colours

The West Bengal women's football team, also earlier the Bengal women's football team, is an Indian women's football team representing West Bengal in the Senior Women's National Football Championship.

== History ==
West Bengal women's football team have appeared in the Women's National Championship finals fifteen times, and have won the championship two times. They were the winner of the inaugural season of Women's National Championship in 1991–92 and last won it in 1996–97 held at Haldia. Legendary football manager Sushil Bhattacharya became the first head coach of the team in 1975.

== Honours ==
=== State (senior) ===
- Rajmata Jijabai Trophy (Senior Women's NFC)
  - Winners (2): 1991–92, 1996–97
  - Runners-up (14): 1992–93, 1994–95, 1995–96, 1997–98, 1998–99, 1999–00, 2000–01, 2002–03, 2003–04, 2004–05, 2006–07, 2008–09, 2010–11, 2025–26
- National Games
  - Silver medal (2): 1999, 2002
  - Bronze medal (4): 2001, 2007, 2011, 2025

=== State (youth) ===
- Junior Girl's National Football Championship
  - Winners (2): 2011–12, 2026–27
  - Runners-up (2): 2003–04, 2025–26
- Sub–Junior Girl's National Football Championship
  - Winners (1): 2010–11
  - Runners-up (1): 2023–24

== See also ==
- Football in West Bengal
- History of football in India
- Football in Kolkata
