= Pondicherry Football Association =

State governing body of Football in Pondicherry

- Sport: Football
- Jurisdiction: Puducherry
- Membership: 4 district associations
- Abbreviation: PFA
- Founded: 1962; 64 years ago
- Affiliation: All India Football Federation (AIFF)
- Headquarters: Pondicherry
- President: D. Nestor
- Secretary: S. Dhanasegar

Official website
- www.pfa.co.in

The Pondicherry Football Association is the football governing body for Puducherry, India. It is affiliated with the All India Football Federation, the national governing body. It sends state teams for Santosh Trophy and Rajmata Jijabai Trophy.

== State teams ==
=== Men ===
- Pondicherry football team
- Pondicherry under-20 football team
- Pondicherry under-15 football team
- Pondicherry under-13 football team

=== Women ===
- Pondicherry women's football team
- Pondicherry women's under-19 football team
- Pondicherry women's under-17 football team

== Affiliated district associations ==
All 4 district of Pondicherry are affiliated with the Pondicherry Football Association.

No.	Association	District	President
1	Karaikal District Football Association	Karaikal	
2	Mahe District Football Association	Mahe	
3	Puducherry District Football Association	Puducherry	
4	Yanam District Football Association	Yanam	

== Competitions ==
=== Men's ===
- Pondicherry Men's League

=== Women's ===
- Pondicherry Women's League

== See also ==
- List of Indian state football associations
- Football in India
