= Jharkhand women's football team =

Jharkhand
- Full name: Jharkhand women's football team
- Ground: Birsa Munda Football Stadium, Ranchi; Birsa Munda Athletics Stadium; JRD Tata Sports Complex, Jamshedpur
- Capacity: 40,000; 35,000; 24,424
- Owner: Jharkhand Football Association
- Head coach: Paras Karmali
- League: Rajmata Jijabai Trophy
- 2025–26: First round
Home colours	Away colours

The Jharkhand women's football team is an Indian women's football team representing Jharkhand in the Senior Women's National Football Championship.

== History ==
Their best performance at the Senior Women's National Football Championship was the semi-final appearance at the 2013–14 edition.

Jharkhand's junior team were the runners-up of the National Junior Girls' Football tournament 2019–20 held at Kolhapur while, their sub-junior team were the champions of the National Sub-Junior Girls' Football tournament 2019–20 held in Cuttack.

== Honours ==
=== State (youth) ===
- Junior Girl's National Football Championship
  - Runners-up (2): 2019–20, 2024–25
- Sub–Junior Girl's National Football Championship
  - Winners (3): 2019–20, 2023–24, 2025–26
  - Runners-up (1): 2024–25
