= Manipur women's football team =

Manipur
- Full name: Manipur women's football team
- Ground: Khuman Lampak Main Stadium
- Capacity: 30,000
- Owner: All Manipur Football Association
- Head coach: Ratan Elangbam
- League: Rajmata Jijabai Trophy
- 2025–26: Champions
Home colours	Away colours

The Manipur women's football team is an Indian women's football team representing Manipur in the Senior Women's National Football Championship. They have appeared in the Women's National Championship finals 26 times, and have been the most successful state team by winning the championship for a record 23 times.

== Honours ==
=== State (senior) ===
- Rajmata Jijabai Trophy (Senior Women's NFC)
  - Winners (24): 1992–93, 1994–95, 1995–96, 1997–98, 1998–99, 1999–2000, 2000–01, 2001–02, 2002–03, 2003–04, 2004–05, 2005–06, 2006–07, 2007–08, 2008–09, 2009–10, 2013–14, 2016–17, 2018–19, 2019–20, 2021–22, 2023–24, 2024–25, 2025–26
  - Runners-up (4): 1991–92, 1996–97, 2015–16, 2017–18
- National Games
  - Gold medal (5): 1999, 2001, 2002, 2015, 2022
  - Silver medal (3): 2007, 2011, 2023

=== State (youth) ===
- Junior Girl's National Football Championship
  - Winners (12): 2002–03, 2003–04, 2005–06, 2006–07, 2007–08, 2010–11, 2013–14, 2015–16, 2017–18, 2023–24, 2024–25, 2025–26
  - Runners-up (2): 2001–02, 2018–19
- Sub–Junior Girl's National Football Championship
  - Winners (6): 2003–04, 2004–05, 2008–09, 2009–10, 2018–19, 2024–25
  - Runners-up (2): 2006–07, 2017–18

=== Others ===
- Pem Dorjee Memorial Cup
  - Winners: 2009
