= Tamil Nadu women's football team =

Tamil Nadu
- Full name: Tamil Nadu women's football team
- Ground: Jawaharlal Nehru Stadium (Chennai)
- Capacity: 40,000
- Owner: Tamil Nadu Football Association
- Head coach: Nivetha Ramadoss
- League: Rajmata Jijabai Trophy
- 2025–26: Semi-finals
Home colours	Away colours

The Tamil Nadu women's football team is an Indian women's football team representing Tamil Nadu in the Senior Women's National Football Championship. They have appeared in the Santosh Trophy finals once, and won the trophy at their maiden attempt at the 2017–18 edition by defeating the reigning champions Manipur.

== Honours ==
=== State (senior) ===
- Rajmata Jijabai Trophy (Senior Women's NFC)
  - Winners (2): 2017–18, 2022–23
- National Games
  - Bronze medal (1): 2022

=== State (youth) ===
- Junior Girl's National Football Championship
  - Winners (2): 2008–09, 2018–19
  - Runners-up (2): 2006–07, 2023–24
