= Uttar Pradesh women's football team =

Uttar Pradesh
- Full name: Uttar Pradesh women's football team
- Ground: Various
- Owner: Uttar Pradesh Football Sangh
- Head coach: Ravi Kumar Punia
- League: Rajmata Jijabai Trophy
- 2025–26: Semi-finals
Home colours	Away colours

The Uttar Pradesh women's football team is an Indian women's football team representing Uttar Pradesh in the Senior Women's National Football Championship.

== See also ==
- List of Indian state football associations
- Football in India
