= Chandigarh Football Association =

State governing body of Football in Chandigarh

- Sport: Football
- Jurisdiction: Chandigarh
- Abbreviation: CFA
- Founded: 1996
- Affiliation: All India Football Federation (AIFF)
- Headquarters: Chandigarh
- President: K. P. Singh
- Secretary: R. C. Bhatt

The Chandigarh Football Association (CFA) is the state governing body of football in Chandigarh. It is affiliated with the All India Football Federation, the national governing body. It sends state teams for Santosh Trophy and Rajmata Jijabai Trophy.

== State teams ==
=== Men ===
- Chandigarh football team
- Chandigarh under-20 football team
- Chandigarh under-15 football team
- Chandigarh under-13 football team

=== Women ===
- Chandigarh women's football team
- Chandigarh women's under-19 football team
- Chandigarh women's under-17 football team

== See also ==
- List of Indian state football associations
- Football in India
