= Kerala women's football team =

- Full name: Kerala women's football team
- Ground: Various
- Owner: Kerala Football Association
- Head coach: Nejmunnisa M
- League: Rajmata Jijabai Trophy
- 2025–26: First round
Home colours	Away colours	Third colours

The Kerala women's football team is an Indian women's football team representing Kerala in the Senior Women's National Football Championship.

== History ==
They have appeared in the Santosh Trophy finals once, and were the runners-up at their maiden attempt at the 2005–06 Senior Women's National Football Championship edition against the reigning champions Manipur at Rourkela.

== Honours ==
=== State (senior) ===
- Rajmata Jijabai Trophy (Senior Women's NFC)
  - Runners-up (1): 2005–06
- National Games
  - Bronze medal (1): 1999
