= Delhi women's football team =

Delhi
- Full name: Delhi women's football team
- Ground: Jawaharlal Nehru Stadium, New Delhi
- Capacity: 60,254
- Owner: Delhi Soccer Association
- League: Rajmata Jijabai Trophy
- 2025–26: First round
Home colours	Away colours

The Delhi women's football team is an Indian women's football team representing Delhi in the Senior Women's National Football Championship.

== See also ==
- List of Indian state football associations
- Football in India
