= Goa women's football team =

Goa
- Full name: Goa women's football team
- Ground: Fatorda Stadium
- Capacity: 19,000
- Owner: Goa Football Association
- Head coach: Remedios Colaco
- League: Rajmata Jijabai Trophy
- 2025–26: Final round
Home colours	Away colours	Third colours

The Goa women's football team is an Indian women's football team representing Goa in the Senior Women's National Football Championship.

== History ==
They have reached the semi-finals of the Senior Women's National Football Championship four times at the 2004–05, 2005–06, 2006–07 and 2007–08 editions.

Goa's junior team were the champions of the inaugural Junior Girl's National Football Championship 2001–02 held at Goa.

== Honours ==
=== State (youth) ===
- Junior Girl's National Football Championship
  - Winners (1): 2001–02
