= Assam women's football team =

Assam
- Full name: Assam women's football team
- Ground: Nehru Stadium, Guwahati
- Capacity: 15,000
- Owner: Assam Football Association
- Head coach: Horen Engti
- League: Rajmata Jijabai Trophy
- 2025–26: Final round
Home colours	Away colours

The Assam women's football team is an Indian women's football team representing Assam in the Senior Women's National Football Championship, which crowns the national women's football champion each year.

== History ==
Their best performance at the Senior Women's National Football Championship was their semi-finals and the third-place playoff winning appearance at the 2000–01 edition held at Gurusar Sadhar in Punjab. They reached the quarter-finals at the 2021–22 edition.

== Honours ==
=== State (senior) ===
- Rajmata Jijabai Trophy (Senior Women's NFC)
  - Third-place (1): 2000–01
