= Bihar women's football team =

Bihar
- Full name: Bihar women's football team
- Ground: Various
- Owner: Bihar Football Association
- League: Rajmata Jijabai Trophy
- 2025–26: First round
Home colours	Away colours

The Bihar women's football team is the women's football team for the Indian state of Bihar.

Their U-17 junior team were the runners-up of the National Junior (U-17) Girls’ Football tournament 2022–23 held at Guwahati.

== Honours ==
=== State (youth) ===
- Junior Girl's National Football Championship
  - Runners-up (1): 2022–23

== See also ==
- India women's football championship
- Bihar men's football team
