= Tripura Football Association =

Organization

- Sport: Football
- Jurisdiction: Tripura
- Membership: 6 district association
- Abbreviation: TFA
- Founded: 1968; 58 years ago
- Affiliation: All India Football Federation (AIFF)
- Headquarters: Agartala
- President: Yarung Debbarma
- Secretary: Amit Chaudhuri

The Tripura Football Association (abbreviated Tripura FA) is one of the 36 Indian state football associations that are affiliated with the All India Football Federation. The Tripura FA administers football in the Indian state of Tripura. It is based in Agartala and the association's president is Yarung Debbarma. The association sends state teams for Santosh Trophy and Rajmata Jijabai Trophy.

== State teams ==
=== Men ===
- Tripura football team
- Tripura under-20 football team
- Tripura under-17 football team
- Tripura under-14 football team
- Tripura under-12 football team

=== Women ===
- Tripura women's football team
- Tripura women's under-19 football team
- Tripura women's under-17 football team

== Affiliated district associations ==
All 8 district of Tripura are affiliated with the Tripura Football Association.

No.	Association	District
1	Dhalai District Football Association	Dhalai
2	Gomati District Football Association	Gomati
3	Khowai District Football Association	Khowai
4	Sipahijala District Football Association	Sipahijala
5	Unakoti District Football Association	Unakoti
6	North Tripura District Football Association	North Tripura
7	South Tripura District Football Association	South Tripura
8	West Tripura District Football Association	West Tripura

== Competitions ==
=== Men's ===
- Chandra Memorial A Division League
- Chandra Memorial B Division League
- Chandra Memorial C Division League
- Rakhal Shield Football Tournament

==== Women's ====
- Baikunth Nath Memorial Women's Football League

== Tripura Football League pyramid ==
Tier	Division
I _{(Level 5 on Indian Football pyramid)}	Chandra Memorial A Division League _{↑promote (I-League 3) ↓relegate}
II _{(Level 6 on Indian Football pyramid)}	Chandra Memorial B Division League _{↑promote ↓relegate}
III _{(Level 7 on Indian Football pyramid)}	Chandra Memorial C Division League _{↑promote}

== Affiliated clubs ==
- Forward Club
- Ananda Vaban FC
- Birendra Club
- Blood Mouth Club
- Ageya Chalo Sangha
- Friends Union FC
- Jewels Association
- Kalyan Samity FC
- Lalbahadur Vyamagar FC
- Mouchak Club
- Nine Bullets FC
- Noboday Sangha
- Ramakrishna Club
- Sabuj Sangha
- SAI SAG
- Skylark Club
- Soroj Sangha
- Town Club
- Tripura Police FC
- Tripura Sports School
- Umakanta SAI
- United BST
- Vivekananda Club
- Youth Club
- Shunali Shivier Club
- Aikatan Yuba Sangstha Shantipara
- Simna Tamakari FC
- Pantwi Sporting Society

== See also ==
- Football in India
- North East Premier League (India)
