= Telangana Football Association =

State governing body of Football in Telangana

- Sport: Football
- Jurisdiction: Telangana
- Membership: 14 district association
- Abbreviation: TFA
- Founded: 2014; 11 years ago
- Affiliation: All India Football Federation (AIFF)
- Headquarters: Hyderabad
- President: Mohd Ali Rafath
- Secretary: G. P. Palguna

The Telangana Football Association (abbreviated TFA) is one of the 36 Indian state football associations that are affiliated with the All India Football Federation. It administers football in the state of Telangana. It also sends state teams for Santosh Trophy and Rajmata Jijabai Trophy.

== State teams ==
=== Men ===
- Telangana football team
- Telangana under-20 football team
- Telangana under-15 football team
- Telangana under-13 football team

=== Women ===
- Telangana women's football team
- Telangana women's under-19 football team
- Telangana women's under-17 football team

== Competitions ==
=== Men's ===
- A Division Rahim League

==== Women's ====
- Telangana Women’s League

== See also ==
- Football in India
- Hyderabad Football Association
