= Madhya Pradesh Football Association =

Sports association in India

- Sport: Football
- Jurisdiction: Madhya Pradesh
- Membership: 55 district association
- Abbreviation: MPFA
- Affiliation: All India Football Federation (AIFF)
- Headquarters: Jabalpur
- President: Alok Chansoria
- Secretary: Mridula Deb

Official website
- the-mpfa.com

The Madhya Pradesh Football Association (MPFA) is the football governing body in the state of Madhya Pradesh, India, and one of the 37 Indian state football associations that are affiliated with the All India Football Federation. The Madhya Pradesh football team is administered by the MPFA. Federation sends state teams for Santosh Trophy and Rajmata Jijabai Trophy. It also organises Madhya Pradesh Premier League, the top tier competition of the state (5th in Indian football league system).

== State teams ==
=== Men ===
- Madhya Pradesh football team
- Madhya Pradesh under-20 football team
- Madhya Pradesh under-15 football team
- Madhya Pradesh under-13 football team

=== Women ===
- Madhya Pradesh women's football team
- Madhya Pradesh women's under-19 football team
- Madhya Pradesh women's under-17 football team

== Affiliated district associations ==
All 55 district of Madhya Pradesh are affiliated with the Madhya Pradesh Football Association.

No.	Association	District	President
1	Alirajpur District Football Association	Alirajpur	
2	Agar Malwa District Football Association	Agar Malwa	
3	Anuppur District Football Association	Anuppur	
4	Ashoknagar District Football Association	Ashoknagar	
5	Balaghat District Football Association	Balaghat	
6	Barwani District Football Association	Barwani	
7	Betul District Football Association	Betul	
8	Bhind District Football Association	Bhind	
9	Bhopal District Football Association	Bhopal	
10	Burhanpur District Football Association	Burhanpur	
11	Datia District Football Association	Datia	
12	Chhatarpur District Football Association	Chhatarpur	
13	Chhindwara District Football Association	Chhindwara	
14	Damoh District Football Association	Damoh	
15	Dewas District Football Association	Dewas	
16	Dhar District Football Association	Dhar	
17	Dindori District Football Association	Dindori	
18	Gwalior District Football Association	Gwalior	
19	Guna District Football Association	Guna	
20	Harda District Football Association	Harda	
21	Indore District Football Association	Indore	
22	Jabalpur District Football Association	Jabalpur	
23	Jhabua District Football Association	Jhabua	
24	Katni District Football Association	Katni	
25	Khandwa District Football Association	Khandwa	
26	Khargone District Football Association	Khargone	
27	Maihar District Football Association	Maihar	
28	Mandla District Football Association	Mandla	
29	Mandsaur District Football Association	Mandsaur	
30	Mauganj District Football Association	Mauganj	
31	Morena District Football Association	Morena	
32	Narmadapuram District Football Association	Narmadapuram	
33	Narsinghpur District Football Association	Narsinghpur	
34	Neemuch District Football Association	Neemuch	
35	Niwari District Football Association	Niwari	
36	Pandhurna District Football Association	Pandhurna	
37	Panna District Football Association	Nadia	
38	Raisen District Football Association	Raisen	
39	Rajgarh District Football Association	Rajgarh	
40	Ratlam District Football Association	Ratlam	
41	Rewa District Football Association	Rewa	
42	Sagar District Football Association	Sagar	
43	Satna District Football Association	Satna	
44	Sehore District Football Association	Sehore	
45	Seoni District Football Association	Seoni	
46	Shahdol District Football Association	Shahdol	
47	Shajapur District Football Association	Shajapur	
48	Sheopur District Football Association	Sheopur	
49	Shivpuri District Football Association	Shivpuri	
50	Sidhi District Football Association	Sidhi	
51	Singrauli District Football Association	Singrauli	
52	Tikamgarh District Football Association	Tikamgarh	
53	Vidisha District Football Association	Vidisha	
54	Ujjain District Football Association	Ujjain	
55	Umaria District Football Association	Umaria	

== Competitions ==
=== Men's ===
- Madhya Pradesh Premier League

=== Women's ===
- Madhya Pradesh Women's Premier League

== Affiliated clubs ==
Club	City/Town
Barwani FC	Barwani
Bharti FC	Jabalpur
Chamunda FC	Dewas
Eagles FC	Neemuch
Khel Evam Yuva Kalyan FC	Chindwada
Lions Club	Jabalpur
Lakecity FC	Bhopal
Madan Maharaj FC	Bhopal
Ratlam City FC	Ratlam
Sehore Boys FC	Sehore
SWS Shivaji FC	Betul
Social Warrior FC	Betul
Narmada Sporting FC	Jabalpur
Lepcha FC	Jabalpur

== See also ==
- Football in India
