= Rajasthan Football Association =

State governing body of Football in Rajasthan

- Sport: Football
- Jurisdiction: Rajasthan
- Membership: 33 district association
- Abbreviation: RFA
- Founded: 1934; 92 years ago (as Rajputana Football Association)
- Affiliation: All India Football Federation (AIFF)
- Headquarters: Jaipur
- President: Manvendra Singh
- Secretary: Dileep Singh Shekawat

The Rajasthan Football Association (RFA), formerly the Rajputana Football Association and Ajmer and Mewar Football Association, is the state-level governing body for football in Rajasthan, India. It is affiliated with the All India Football Federation, the sport's national governing body. It sends state teams for Santosh Trophy and Rajmata Jijabai Trophy.

== History ==
The Rajasthan Football Association was founded as the Rajputana Football Association in 1934. The objective of RFA is to improve the standard of football in the Indian state of Rajasthan.

In 2016, after the RFA become operational after two decades of non-functioning, RFA has decided to revamp the Rajasthan Football System. The association started the first ever statewide football league in Rajasthan known as the Rajasthan State Men's League, which is a multi-divisional competition from state to district levels. The association is also working to create new clubs, coaches and referees in the state to boost football.

== State teams ==
=== Men ===
- Rajasthan football team
- Rajasthan under-20 football team
- Rajasthan under-15 football team
- Rajasthan under-13 football team

=== Women ===
- Rajasthan women's football team
- Rajasthan women's under-19 football team
- Rajasthan women's under-17 football team

== Competitions ==
=== Men's ===
- Rajasthan State Men's League

=== Women's ===
- Rajasthan Women's League

=== Futsal ===
- R-League Futsal

== See also ==
- List of Indian state football associations
- Football in India
