= Rajmata Jijabai Trophy =

Indian women's professional football league

- Organiser(s): All India Football Federation (AIFF)
- Founded: 1991; 35 years ago
- Region: India
- Teams: Group stage: 31; Final round: 10
- Related competitions: National Games
- Current champions: Manipur (24th title)
- Most championships: Manipur (24 titles)
- Broadcaster(s): SSEN; SportsKPI (YouTube)
- Website: Senior Women's NFC
- 2025–26

The Senior Women's National Football Championship for Rajmata Jijabai Trophy, or simply the Rajmata Jijabai Trophy, (Note: renamed since the 2023–24 season) is a women's football tournament contested by state associations and government institutions in India. The first edition was held in 1991 and is organized by the All India Football Federation to crown the national women's football champion each year. It is based on a league and knockout format.

== Format ==
The format consists of zonal group stages where all the state teams participate. It is followed by the final round.

When the number of teams is known, those are divided into eight groups with equal number of teams. The preliminary qualifying league will be played on a single leg league basis. The eight winners move on to the two quarter final leagues. That is played as a single leg league, with the best two teams of each group qualifying for the semi-finals stage. From there on it is a knock out format with single leg matches. Tie breakers in the league stages are:

1. Superior number of points in all matches
2. Superior number of points in bilateral matches of tied teams
3. Superior goal difference
4. Superior number of goal scored
5. Drawing of lots

== Participants ==
=== Current teams ===
The following teams participate in the tournament as states, union territories and institutions.

- Andaman and Nicobar Islands
- Andhra Pradesh
- Arunachal Pradesh
- Assam
- Bihar
- Chandigarh
- Chhattisgarh
- Dadra & Nagar Haveli and Daman & Diu
- Delhi
- Goa
- Gujarat
- Haryana
- Himachal Pradesh
- Jammu and Kashmir
- Jharkhand
- Karnataka
- Kerala
- Ladakh
- Lakshadweep
- Madhya Pradesh
- Maharashtra
- Manipur
- Meghalaya
- Mizoram
- Nagaland
- Odisha
- Pondicherry
- Punjab
- Rajasthan
- Railways
- Sikkim
- Tamil Nadu
- Telangana
- Tripura
- Uttar Pradesh
- Uttarakhand
- West Bengal

=== Defunct teams ===
- Daman and Diu (until 2022/23)
- Dadra and Nagar Haveli (until 2022/23)

== Results ==
The following is the list of winners and runners-up from every edition of the Championship

Season	Year	Host	Winner	Score	Runner-up
1st	1991–92	Imphal	Bengal		Manipur
2nd	1992–93	Daltonganj	Manipur	4–0	Bengal
3rd	1994–95	Haldia	Manipur	1–0	Bengal
4th	1995–96	Jorhat	Manipur	6–5 (p)	Bengal
5th	1996–97	Haldia	Bengal	1–0	Manipur
6th	1997–98	Barasat	Manipur	2–1	Bengal
7th	1998–99	Shillong	Manipur	1–0	Bengal
8th	1999–00	Diphu	Manipur	1–0	Bengal
9th	2000–01	Gurusar Sadhar	Manipur	1–0	Bengal
10th	2001–02	Siliguri	Manipur	3–0	Orissa
11th	2002–03	Chennai	Manipur	2–0	Bengal
12th	2003–04	Bhopal	Manipur	0–0 (6–5 p)	Bengal
13th	2004–05	Imphal	Manipur	3–0	Bengal
14th	2005–06	Rourkela	Manipur	2–0	Kerala
15th	2006–07	Rourkela	Manipur	2–1	West Bengal
16th	2007–08	Haldia	Manipur	4–1	Orissa
17th	2008–09	Neyveli	Manipur	2–0	West Bengal
18th	2009–10	Imphal	Manipur	1–0	Orissa
19th	2010–11	Bhilai	Orissa	5–0	West Bengal
20th	2013–14	Golaghat	Manipur	3–1	Orissa
21st	2015–16	Jabalpur	Railways	3–3 (4–3 p)	Manipur
22nd	2016–17	Jalandhar	Manipur	3–1	Railways
23rd	2017–18	Cuttack	Tamil Nadu	2–1	Manipur
24th	2018–19	Cuttack	Manipur	2–1	Odisha
25th	2019–20	Pasighat	Manipur	1–0	Railways
26th	2021–22	Kozhikode	Manipur	0–0 (2–1 p)	Railways
27th	2022–23	Ludhiana	Tamil Nadu	2–1	Haryana
28th	2023–24	Kolkata	Manipur	2–0	Haryana
29th	2024–25	Narayanpur	Manipur	1–0	Odisha
30th	2025–26	Narayanpur	Manipur	1–0	West Bengal

== Performance by teams ==
Team	Wins	Runners-up	Last win
Manipur	24	4	2025–26
Bengal	2	14	1996–97
Tamil Nadu	2	0	2022–23
Odisha	1	6	2010–11
Railways	1	3	2015–16
Haryana	0	2	–
Kerala	0	1	–

== See also ==
- Football in India
- Sport in India
- History of Indian football
- Indian football league system
