= Karnataka State Football Association =

State governing body of Football in Karnataka

- Sport: Football
- Jurisdiction: Karnataka
- Membership: 31 district associations
- Abbreviation: KSFA
- Founded: 1908; 118 years ago (as Mysore Football Association)
- Affiliation: All India Football Federation (AIFF)
- Headquarters: Bengaluru
- President: N. A. Haris
- Secretary: M. Satyanarayan

Official website
- www.ksfa.in

The Karnataka State Football Association (abbreviated KSFA), formerly the Mysore Football Association, is one of the 36 Indian state football associations that are affiliated with the All India Football Federation. The KSFA administers football in the Indian state of Karnataka. The men's and women's professional leagues operate under it. Since January 2017, N. A. Haris has been serving as the president. It sends state teams for Santosh Trophy and Rajmata Jijabai Trophy.

== History ==
Karnataka State Football Association (KSFA) was started in the year of 1908, which was then known as the Mysore Football Association (MFA).

== State teams ==
=== Men ===
- Karnataka football team
- Karnataka under-20 football team
- Karnataka under-15 football team
- Karnataka under-13 football team

=== Women ===
- Karnataka women's football team
- Karnataka women's under-19 football team
- Karnataka women's under-17 football team

== Affiliated district associations ==
All 31 districts of Karnataka are affiliated with the Karnataka State Football Association.

No.	Association	District	President
1	Bagalkote District Football Association	Bagalkote	
2	Bangalore District Football Association	Bangalore Urban	
3	Bangalore District Football Association	Bangalore Rural	
4	Belagavi District Football Association	Belagavi	
5	Ballari District Football Association	Ballari	
6	Bidar District Football Association	Bidar	
7	Bijapur District Football Association	Bijapur	
8	Chamarajanagar District Football Association	Chamarajanagar	
9	Chikkaballapura District Football Association	Chikkaballapura	
10	Chikmagalur District Football Association	Chikmagalur	
11	Chitradurga District Football Association	Chitradurga	
12	Dakshina Kannada District Football Association	Dakshina Kannada	
13	Davanagere District Football Association	Davanagere	
14	Dharwad District Football Association	Dharwad	
15	Gadag District Football Association	Gadag	
16	Kalaburagi District Football Association	Kalaburagi	
17	Hassan District Football Association	Hassan	
18	Haveri District Football Association	Haveri	
19	Kodagu District Football Association	Kodagu	
20	Kolar District Football Association	Kolar	
21	Koppal District Football Association	Koppal	
22	Mandya District Football Association	Mandya	
23	Mysore District Football Association	Mysore	
24	Raichur District Football Association	Raichur	
25	Ramanagara District Football Association	Ramanagara	
26	Shivamogga District Football Association	Shivamogga	
27	Tumakuru District Football Association	Tumakuru	
28	Udupi District Football Association	Udupi	
29	Uttara Kannada District Football Association	Uttara Kannada	
30	Vijayanagara District Football Association	Vijayanagara	
31	Yadgir District Football Association	Yadgir	

== Competitions ==
=== Club level ===
==== Men's ====
- Karnataka Super Division
- KSFA A Division
- KSFA B Division
- KSFA C Division
- KSFA D Division
- Stafford Challenge Cup

==== Women's ====
- Karnataka Women's Super Division League
- Karnataka Women's A Division League
- Karnataka Women's B Division League

== Karnataka Football League pyramid ==
=== Men's ===
KSFA Leagues
Tier	Division
I _{(Level 5 on Indian Football pyramid)}	Karnataka Super Division _{↑promote (to I-League 3) ↓relegate}
II _{(Level 6 on Indian Football pyramid)}	KSFA A Division _{↑promote ↓relegate}
III _{(Level 7 on Indian Football pyramid)}	KSFA B Division _{↑promote ↓relegate}
IV _{(Level 8 on Indian Football pyramid)}	KSFA C Division _{↑promote}

=== Women's ===
Karnataka Women's League
Tier	Division
I _{(Level 3 on Indian Women's Football pyramid)}	Karnataka Women's Super Division League _{↑promote (to Indian Women's League 2) ↓relegate}
II _{(Level 4 on Indian Women's Football pyramid)}	Karnataka Women's A Division League _{↑promote ↓relegate}
II _{(Level 5 on Indian Women's Football pyramid)}	Karnataka Women's B Division League _{↑promote}

== Presidents ==
- Major F. Ward (1933)
- D. Gunabhushanam (1950–51; 1954–61)
- Mir Iqbal Hussain (1965–76; 1981–88)
- A. R. Khaleel (1989–2017)
- N. A. Haris (2017–present)

== See also ==
- Football in India
