= Andhra Pradesh Football Association =

State governing body of Football in Andhra Pradesh

- Sport: Football
- Jurisdiction: Andhra Pradesh
- Membership: 13 district associations
- Abbreviation: APFA
- Founded: 1959; 67 years ago
- Affiliation: All India Football Federation (AIFF)
- Headquarters: Visakhapatnam
- President: Kotagiri Sridhar

Official website
- apfa.in

The Andhra Pradesh Football Association (APFA), formerly Andhra Football Association, is the state governing body of football in Andhra Pradesh. It is affiliated with the All India Football Federation, the national governing body. The APFA sends state teams for the Santosh Trophy and the Rajmata Jijabai Trophy.

== History ==
The sports federation was formed in 1959, following the merger of the Hyderabad Football Association with the Andhra Football Association under the auspices of the then AIFF vice-president Shiv Kumar Lal.

== State teams ==
=== Men ===
- Andhra Pradesh football team
- Andhra Pradesh under-20 football team
- Andhra Pradesh under-15 football team
- Andhra Pradesh under-13 football team

=== Women ===
- Andhra Pradesh women's football team
- Andhra Pradesh women's under-19 football team
- Andhra Pradesh women's under-17 football team

== Competitions ==
=== AP Super Cup ===
Locations of AP Super Cup clubs

=== Clubs ===
Club	Districts			
Vamsadhara FC	Srikakulam	Vizianagaram	Parvathipuram Manyam	
Visakha FC	Visakhapatnam	Anakapalli	Alluri Sitarama Raju	
Godavari FC	East Godavari	Kakinada	Konaseema	
Kolleru FC	West Godavari	Eluru	Krishna	NTR
Nallamala FC	Guntur	Bapatla	Prakasam	Palnadu
Coramandal FC	Nellore	Tirupati	Chittoor	
Penna FC	Kadapa	Annamayya	Sri Sathya Sai	
Tungabhadra FC	Anantapur	Kurnool	Nandyala	

== See also ==
- List of Indian state football associations
- Football in India
