= Gujarat State Football Association =

State governing body of Football in Gujarat

- Sport: Football
- Jurisdiction: Gujarat
- Membership: 33 district associations
- Abbreviation: GSFA
- Founded: 1961
- Affiliation: All India Football Federation (AIFF)
- Headquarters: Ahmedabad
- President: Parimal Nathwani
- Secretary: Mulrajsinh Chudasama

Official website
- gsfa.in

The Gujarat State Football Association (abbreviated GSFA) is one of the 36 Indian state football associations that are affiliated to the All India Football Federation.

== State teams ==
=== Men ===
- Gujarat football team
- Gujarat under-20 football team
- Gujarat under-15 football team
- Gujarat under-13 football team

=== Women ===
- Gujarat women's football team
- Gujarat women's under-19 football team
- Gujarat women's under-17 football team

== Affiliated district associations ==
All 33 districts of Gujarat are affiliated with the Gujarat State Football Association.

No.	Association	District	Representative
1	Ahmedabad District Football Association	Ahmedabad	Arunsing Rajput
2	Amreli District Football Association	Amreli	Piyush Joshi
3	Anand District Football Association	Anand	Mitul Patel
4	Aravali District Football Association	Aravali	Dipti Verma
5	Banaskantha District Football Association	Banaskantha	Ahmed Shaikh
6	Baroda District Football Association	Baroda	Sandeep Desai
7	Bharuch District Football Association	Bharuch	Mayank Buch
8	Bhavnagar District Football Association	Bhavnagar	Mulraj Chudasma
9	Botad District Football Association	Botad	Jayrajsinh Jadeja
10	Chhota Udaipur District Football Association	Chhota Udaipur	Selva Rathwa
11	Dahod District Football Association	Dahod	I. M. Shaikh
12	Dang District Football Association	Dang	Dharmesh D. Gavit
13	Devbhumi Dwarka District Football Association	Devbhumi Dwarka	Shafiq Shaikh
14	Gandhinagar District Football Association	Gandhinagar	Natwar Sisodia
15	Gir Somnath District Football Association	Gir Somnath	Viral Dodia
16	Jamnagar District Football Association	Jamnagar	Anand Maadam
17	Junagadh District Football Association	Kalahandi	Uday Jalu
18	Kheda District Football Association	Kandhamal	Paresh Patel
19	Kutch District Football Association	Kutch	Hasmat Khan
20	Mahisagar District Football Association	Mahisagar	Anmol Rathod
21	Mehsana District Football Association	Mehsana	D A Gandhi
22	Morbi District Football Association	Morbi	Jitendra Kaid
23	Narmada District Football Association	Narmada	Mitsu M. Buch
24	Navsari District Football Association	Navsari	Kantilal Jagwani
25	Panchmahal District Football Association	Panchmahal	Mohsin Abbasi
26	Patan District Football Association	Patan	Latif Sumra
27	Porbandar District Football Association	Porbandar	Lav H. Buddhadev
28	Rajkot District Football Association	Rajkot	Rohit Bundela
29	Sabarkantha District Football Association	Sabarkantha	Ravi Verma
30	Surat District Football Association	Surat	Kamlesh Sailor
31	Surendranagar District Football Association	Surendranagar	Mahipatsinh Rana
32	Tapi District Football Association	Tapi	Manilal Patel
33	Valsad District Football Association	Valsad	Sushil Surve

== Competitions ==
=== Club level ===
==== Men's senior ====
- Gujarat SFA Club Championship
- Gujarat Super League (franchise)

==== Women's senior ====
- Gujarat State Women's League

== See also ==
- List of Indian state football associations
- Football in India
