= List of people from Chhattisgarh =

This is a list of notable people from Chhattisgarh, India, throughout history.

== Religion ==
- Guru Ghasidas - founder of Satnami Sect
- Vallabha - vaishnavite philosopher

== Politicians ==
- Ajit Jogi - First Chief Minister of Chhattisgarh
- Shyama Charan Shukla - former Madhya Pradesh Chief Minister
- Nareshchandra Singh - former Madhya Pradesh Chief Minister
- Bhupesh Baghel - former Chief Minister of Chhattisgarh
- Raman Singh - former Chief Minister of Chhattisgarh
- Motilal Vora - former Chief Minister of Madhya Pradesh
- Vishnu Deo Sai - Chief Minister of Chhattisgarh
- Arun Sao - Deputy Chief Minister of Chhattisgarh
- Tokhan Sahu - Minister of State for Housing and Urban Affairs of India
- Vidya Charan Shukla - former Minister of External Affairs
- Arvind Netam - former Minister of State
- Vijay Sharma - Deputy Chief Minister of Chhattisgarh

== Activists ==
- Thakur Pyarelal - Trade union leader and Freedom fighter
- Shankar Guha Niyogi - Trade union leader. founder of Chhattisgarh Mukti Morcha
- Soni Sori - Adivasi right activist. won Front Line Defenders award
- Sudha Bharadwaj - Trade unionist and lawyer. Chhattisgarh Mukti Morcha member
- Shamshad Begum - Padma Shri awardee social worker
- Alok Shukla - Environment activist. founder of Chhattisgarh Bachao Andolan. won Goldman Environmental Prize in 2024
- Ramesh Agrawal - Goldman environmental prize awardee social worker
- Phoolbasan Bai Yadav - Padma Shri awardee social worker
- Damodar Bapat - Padma Shri awardee social worker

== Scientists ==
- Rajendra Badgaiyan - Cognitive Neuroscientist
- Pukhraj Bafna - Paediatrician
- Narendra Kumar - Theoretical Physicist
- Binayak Sen - Paediatrician

== Musicians ==
- Teejan Bai - Exponent of Pandavani(Kapalik)
- Anupama Bhagwat - Sitarist
- Mamta Chandrakar - Playback singer
- Usha Barle - Pandavani singer
- Rajat Dholakia
- Sumedha Karmahe
- Punaram Nishad - Pandavani singer(Vedamati)
- Sulakshana Pandit
- Jagdish Prasad

== Cinema ==
=== Director ===
- Anurag Basu
- Satish Jain

=== Actors ===
- Satyajeet Dubey
- Pooran Kiri
- Omkar Das Manikpuri
- Aashay Mishra
- Govind Ram Nirmalkar
- Kishore Sahu
- Anuj Sharma
- Vega Tamotia
- Sandit Tiwari
- Gehana Vasisth
- Swati Verma

=== Writer ===
- Vinod Kumar Shukla
- Habib Tanvir

== Models ==
- Unnati Davara
- Shivani Jadhav
- Renee Kujur

== Military ==
- Kaushal Yadav

== Sports ==
- Leslie Claudius - three time Summer Olympics gold medallist in field Hockey
- Rajendra Prasad - Arjuna Awardee boxer
- Saba Anjum Karim - Arjuna Awardee Field hockey player
- Renuka Yadav - Field hockey player
- Chitrasen Sahu - Para-Mountaineer
- Kiran Pisda - Football player, ex-ŽNK Dinamo Zagreb
- Aakarshi Kashyap - Silver medallist at 2022 Commonwealth Games in Mixed team
- Shashank Singh [Cricket]

== See also ==
- List of people from Madhya Pradesh
- Lists of Indian people
