= Rohan Shah (powerlifter) =

Indian powerlifter

Personal information
- Born: 3 October 1991 (age 35) Bilaspur, India

Sport
- Country: India
- Sport: Powerlifting, strength athletics
- Coached by: Surisetti Kumar
Medal record
Powerlifting
Representing India
World Cup Powerlifting Championship
Gold medal – first place	2020 Kyiv	90 kg – Deadlift
Gold medal – first place	2020 Kyiv	90 kg – Bench press
Strength athletics
World Strength Lifting Championship
Silver medal – second place	2019 Thailand
Bronze medal – third place	2022 Kyrgyzstan
Silver medal – second place	2024 Kazakhstan
Bronze medal – third place	2024 Kazakhstan
Gold medal – first place	2025 Thailand
Silver medal – second place	2025 Thailand
International Strength Lifting Championship
Gold medal – first place	2023 Kathmandu

Rohan Shah (born 3 October 1991) is an Indian powerlifter and strength athlete from Bilaspur, Chhattisgarh.

He represented India and won two gold medals at the World Cup Powerlifting Championship held in Kyiv, Ukraine, in 2020, and one gold medal at the International Strength Lifting Championship held in Kathmandu, Nepal, in 2023. He also won four silver medals at the World Strength Lifting Championship held in Thailand in 2019, Kazakhstan in 2024 and Thailand in 2025, and three bronze medals at the same championship held in Kyrgyzstan in 2022 and Kazakhstan in 2024.

== Early life ==
He hails from Bilaspur, Chhattisgarh. His father, Rajesh Shah, represented the Indian Railways in badminton. He was coached by Surisetti Kumar.

== Career ==
=== Powerlifting ===
In 2019, Shah competed at the 8th World Strength Lifting Championship in Thailand, where he won two silver medals. In 2020, he represented India at the World Cup Powerlifting Championship in Kyiv, Ukraine, winning gold medals in the deadlift and bench press events in the 90 kg weight category.

In February 2020, he earned a silver medal at the Chhattisgarh State Strength Lifting Championship in Balod, where the Bilaspur team placed first overall with 24 total medals.

In September 2022, Shah competed at the 9th World Strength Lifting Championship in Kyrgyzstan in the senior 105 kg weight category. He won two bronze medals, lifting a total of 407.5 kg in the strength lifting event and 175 kg in the incline bench press event.

In 2023, Rohan Shah won a gold medal at an International Strength Lifting Championship held in Nepal. Later that year, in December 2023, he won two silver medals at the 10th World Strength Lifting and Incline Bench Press Championship, held at the Lal Bahadur Shastri Stadium in Hyderabad, India.

In 2024, Shah competed in the 11th World Strength Lifting Championship in Kazakhstan, where he won one silver medal and one bronze medal. In 2025, he competed in the 12th World Strength Lifting Championship held in Thailand, winning one gold medal and one silver medal.

=== Athletics ===
In 2021, Shah competed domestically at the 3rd National Masters Athletics Championship in Varanasi, India, where he won a bronze medal in the shot put event.

== Other activities ==
Shah delivered a TEDx talk in 2024 titled "Let Ambition to Way Yourself" at Lingaya's Lalita Devi Institute of Management & Sciences, where he discussed career transitions and pursuing passion in sports.

== See also ==
- List of people from Chhattisgarh
