= Narendra Kumar (physicist) =

Indian theoretical physicist (1940–2017)

- Born: 1 February 1940; Bilaspur, Chhattisgarh, India
- Died: 28 August 2017 (aged 77)
- Education: IIT Kharagpur; IIT Bombay; University of British Columbia
- Known for: Studies on disordered systems, Superconductivity
- Awards: 1985 Shanti Swarup Bhatnagar Prize; 1992 TWAS Prize; 1996 IITB Distinguished Alumnus Award; 1997 Mahendra Lal Sircar Prize; 1998 Goyal Award; 1999 FICCI Award; 2000 ISCA C. V. Raman Birth Centenary Award; 2000 INSA Meghnad Saha Medal; 2006 R. D. Birla Award; 2006 MRSI Distinguished Materials Scientist Award; 2006 Padma Shri; 2016 SASTRA Award
- Scientific career
- Fields: Condensed matter physics; Quantum physics
- Workplaces: Defence Institute of Advanced Technology; National Chemical Laboratory; Indian Institute of Science; Raman Research Institute; Jawaharlal Nehru Centre for Advanced Scientific Research Tata Institute of Fundamental Research; University of Liège; University of Warwick; Drexel University; National Autonomous University of Mexico; McGill University; International Centre for Theoretical Physics
- Doctoral advisor: Krityunjai Prasad Sinha; Ram Prakash Singh; Maurice Pryce

Narendra Kumar (1 February 1940 – 28 August 2017) was an Indian theoretical physicist and a Homi Bhaba Distinguished Professor of the Department of Atomic Energy at Raman Research Institute. He was also an honorary professor at Jawaharlal Nehru Centre for Advanced Scientific Research.

Known for his research on disordered systems and superconductivity, Kumar was an elected fellow of all the three major Indian science academies – Indian Academy of Sciences, Indian National Science Academy, and National Academy of Sciences, India – as well as the American Physical Society and The World Academy of Sciences. The Council of Scientific and Industrial Research, the apex agency of the Government of India for scientific research, awarded him the Shanti Swarup Bhatnagar Prize for Science and Technology, one of the highest Indian science awards, for his contributions to physical sciences in 1985. (Note: Long link - please select award year to see details) In 2006, he received the Padma Shri, the fourth highest civilian honour of the Government of India, in the science and engineering category.

== Biography ==
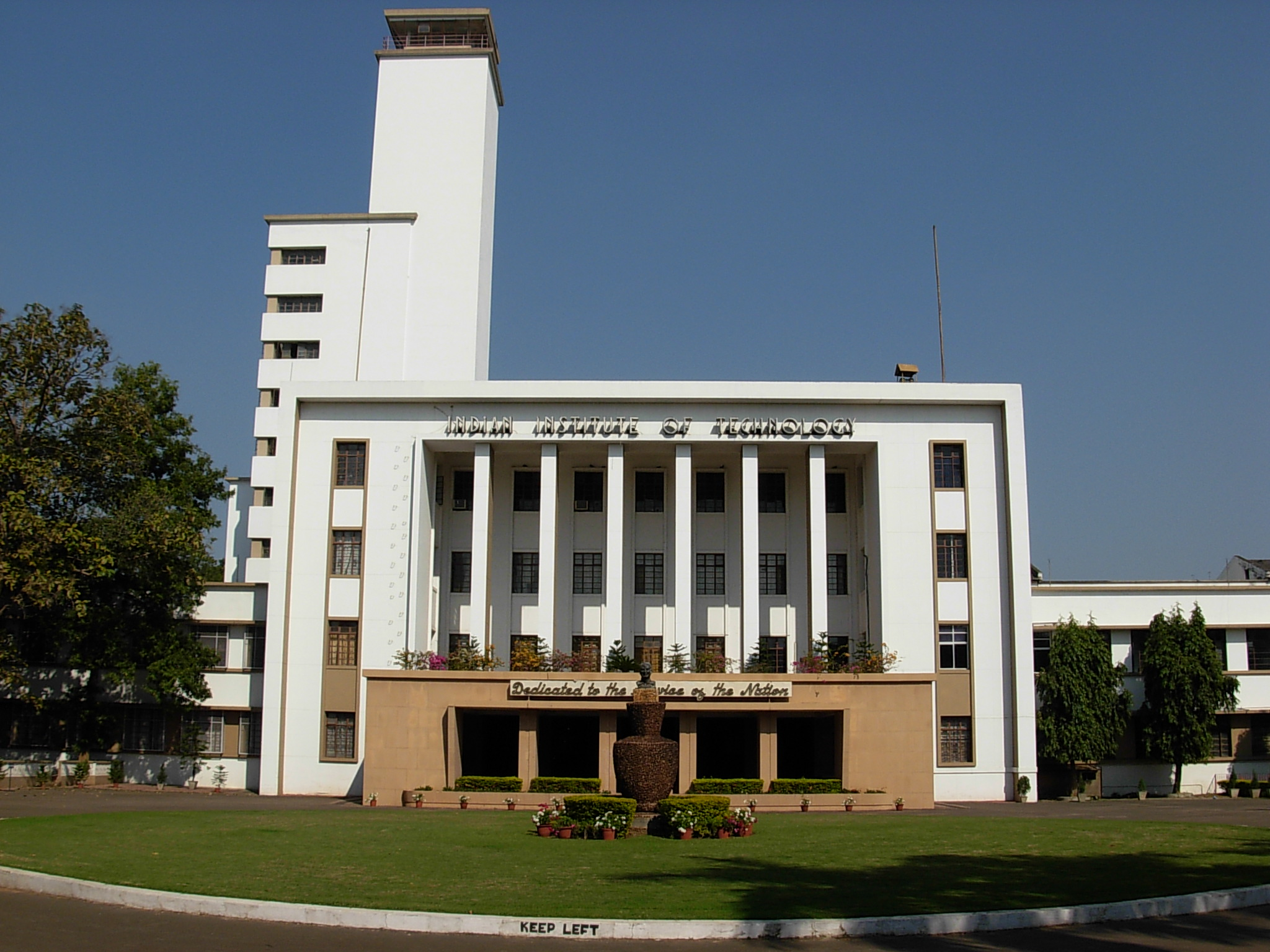
IIT Kharagpur - Main Building

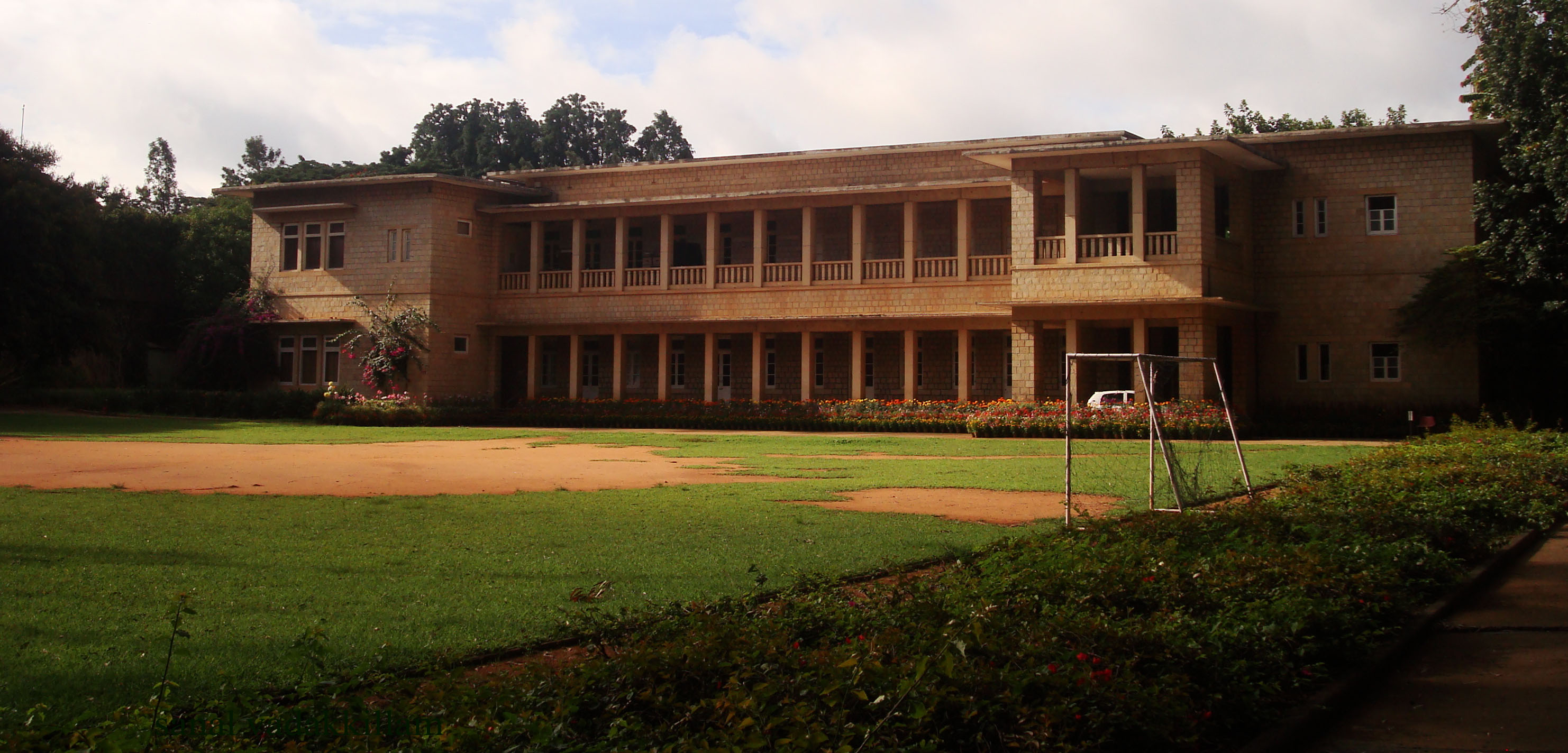
Raman Research Institute

Born on the 1 February 1940 to Labha Mal Julka-Taravatti couple in Bilaspur in the Indian state of Chhattisgarh, (Note: in undivided Madhya Pradesh) Narendra Kumar obtained an honors degree in electronics and electrical communication engineering in 1962 from the Indian Institute of Technology, Kharagpur, passing the examination with second rank. He continued at IIT Kharagpur for his master's studies and before completing MTech with a first rank in 1963, he stood first in India in the All India Electronics Engineering Examination in 1962. After obtaining the master's degree, Kumar started his career in 1963 as a senior scientific officer at Defence Institute of Advanced Technology (then known as Institute of Armament Studies) and served there till his move to National Chemical Laboratory in 1965 as a B grade scientist.

Kumar resumed his studies in 1968 by enrolling for doctoral studies at the Indian Institute of Technology, Bombay and secured a PhD under the guidance of Krityunjai Prasad Sinha and Ram Prakash Singh in 1971. After doing his postdoctoral work at the laboratory of Maurice Pryce of University of British Columbia, he joined Indian Institute of Science as an assistant professor and served the institution for close to quarter of a century during which period, he held the position of a professor from 1975 to 1994. Kumar was appointed as the director of Raman Research Institute (RRI) in 1994 where he served until his superannuation in 2005. Post-retirement, he continued his association with RRI as the Homi Bhabha Distinguished Scientist and DAE chair professor. During his career, he has had visiting assignments at various institutions abroad such as University of Liège (1975–76), University of Warwick (1978–79), Drexel University (1984), National Autonomous University of Mexico (1985), McGill University (1987 and 1988) and International Centre for Theoretical Physics (1988–89). Kumar was also associated with Jawaharlal Nehru Centre for Advanced Scientific Research, a multidisciplinary research institute, where he held an honorary professor position and with Tata Institute of Fundamental Research as an adjunct professor since 2008.

Kumar lived in R. M. V. Extension in Bengaluru in Karnataka. He died on 28 August 2017.

== Legacy ==
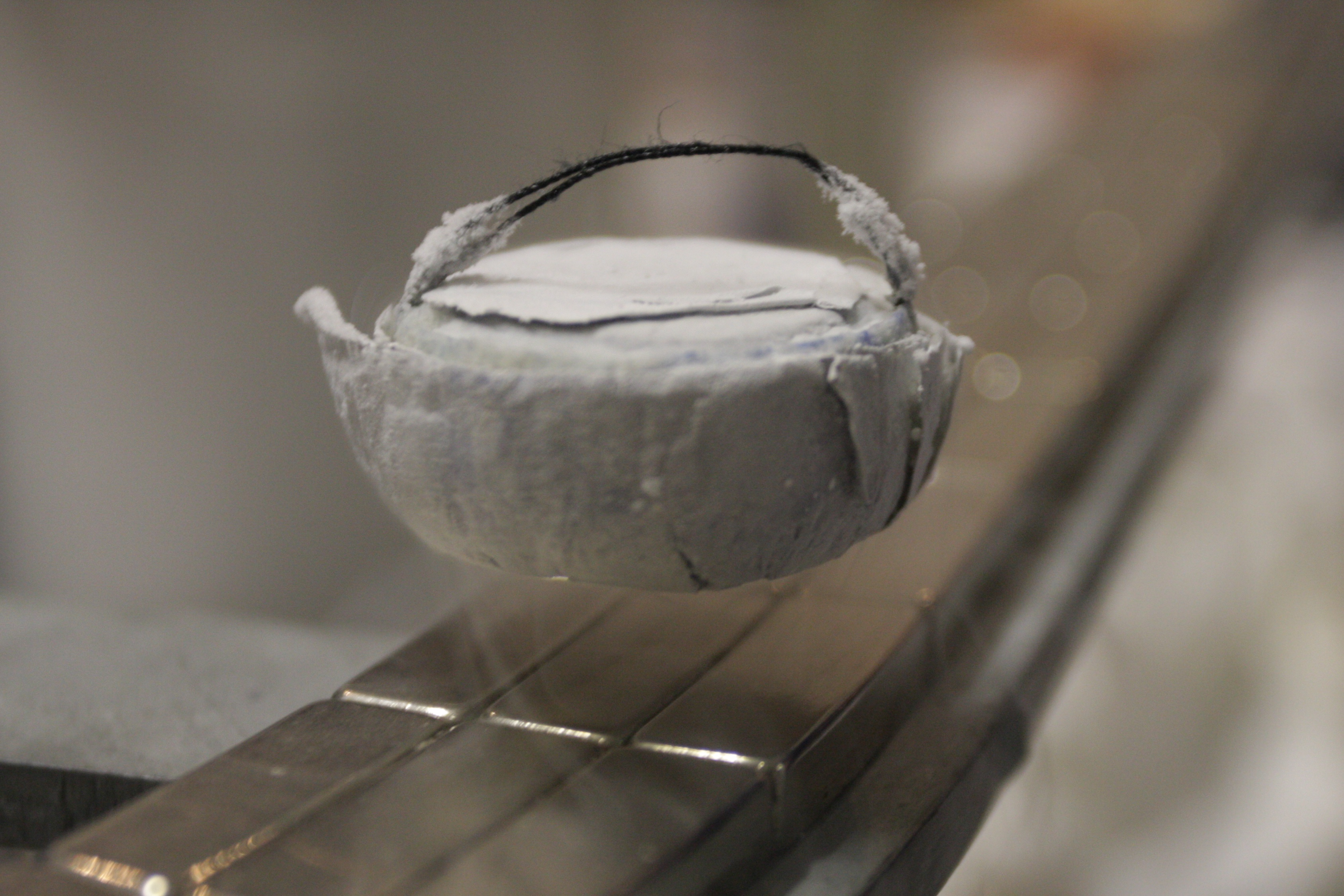
A high-temperature superconductor levitating above a magnet

His doctoral studies at IIT Bombay gave Kumar the opportunity to work alongside noted physicists such as Krityunjai Prasad Sinha and Ram Prakash Singh, and during his days at the University of British Columbia he studied condensed matter physics with Maurice Pryce. He carried on his work on superconductivity and disordered systems at Indian Institute of Science and his collaboration with Pedro Pereyra and others yielded the Dorokhov-Mello-Pereyra-Kumar (DMPK) equation, a theory on multi-channel conductivity using the principle of maximum entropy, which has since been subjected to studies by several scientists. Besides his work on diffusion in glasses, Kumar has done extensive studies on random dynamical systems, especially on the nature of electron transport. His studies have been documented by way of a number of articles and the article repository of Indian Academy of Sciences has listed 167 of them. Kumar has published four books, Interaction-Magnetically-Ordered-Solids, coauthored with his mentor, Krityunjai Prasad Sinha, Invitation to Contemporary Physics, Deterministic Chaos: Complex Chance out of Simple Necessity and Quantum Transport in Mesoscopic Systems: Complexity and Statistical Fluctuations which is a monograph in the field of mesoscopic physics. He had also guided 12 doctoral students in their doctoral studies.

Kumar had been connected with the International Centre for Theoretical Physics (ICTP) since 1970, serving as an associate or senior associate until 1992 and as a staff associate from 1993 to 2010. He was a former member of the editorial board of Journal of Physics: Condensed Matter and various committees of The World Academy of Sciences. Kumar had been involved with the committees for the review of research institutions which included Tata Institute of Fundamental Research and Physical Research Laboratory and has been the chairman of the committee of the Council of Scientific and Industrial Research for selecting Shanti Swarup Bhatnagar Prize winners. He also served as the president of the Indian Academy of Sciences during 1998–2000.

== Awards and honors ==
The Council of Scientific and Industrial Research awarded Kumar the Shanti Swarup Bhatnagar Prize, one of the highest Indian science awards, in 1985. He received the TWAS Prize in 1992 and the Indian Institute of Technology, Bombay, chose him for its Distinguished Alumnus Award in 1996. A year after receiving the Mahendra Lal Sircar Prize in 1997, Kumar was selected for the Goyal Award of Kurukshetra University in 1998, followed by the FICCI Award of the Federation of Indian Chambers of Commerce & Industry in 1999. The Indian Science Congress Association awarded him the C. V. Raman Birth Centenary Award in 2000, the same year as Kumar received the Meghnad Saha Medal of the Indian National Science Academy. The year 2006 brought him three major awards: the Padma Shri, the fourth highest Indian civilian honor, the R. D. Birla Award of the Indian Physics Association, and the Distinguished Materials Scientist Award of the Materials Research Society of India.

The Indian Academy of Sciences elected Kumar as their fellow in 1985 and Kumar was elected as a fellow by the Indian National Science Academy in 1987. He received elected fellowships of two science organizations in 1994, the National Academy of Sciences, India, and the American Physical Society. Kumar became a fellow of The World Academy of Sciences the next year. The award orations delivered by him include the Jawarharlal Nehru Birth Centenary lecture (1996) and the Jagadis Chandra Bose lecture (2008) of the Indian National Science Academy.

== Selected bibliography ==
=== Books ===
- Krityunjai Prasad Sinha; Narendra Kumar (1980). Interactions in magnetically ordered solids. Oxford University Press. ISBN 978-0-19-851423-7.
- N. Kumar (1996). Deterministic Chaos. Universities Press. pp. 1–. ISBN 978-81-7371-042-1.
- Q Ho-Kim; N Kumar; C S Lam (6 January 2004). Invitation to Contemporary Physics. World Scientific. ISBN 978-981-4486-48-4.
- Pier A. Mello; Narendra Kumar (2004). Quantum Transport in Mesoscopic Systems: Complexity and Statistical Fluctuations, a Maximum-entropy Viewpoint. Oxford University Press. ISBN 978-0-19-852582-0.

=== Articles ===
- K. P. Sinha; N. Kumar (1971). "Quantum theoretic explanation of the Schwarz-Hora effect". Proceedings of the Indian Academy of Sciences, Section A. 74 (2): 91–98. doi:10.1007/BF03047396. S2CID 67806909.
- C.N.R. Rao; T. V. Ramakrishnan; N. Kumar (1990). "Systematics in the thermopower behaviour of several series of bismuth and thallium cuprate superconductors:: An interpretation of the temperature variation and the sign of the thermopower". Physica C: Superconductivity. 165 (2): 183–188. Bibcode:1990PhyC..165..183R. doi:10.1016/0921-4534(90)90166-C. ISSN 0921-4534.
- Navinder Singh; N Kumar (2005). "Dissipative electron–phonon system photo-excited far from equilibrium". Journal of Statistical Mechanics: Theory and Experiment. 2005 (6) L06001. arXiv:cond-mat/0501479. Bibcode:2005JSMTE..06L.001S. doi:10.1088/1742-5468/2005/06/L06001. S2CID 119473142.
- N. Kumar (2006). "Bose-Einstein condensation: where many become one and so there is plenty of room at the bottom". Pramana - Journal of Physics. 67 (1): 101–112. Bibcode:2006Prama..67..101K. doi:10.1007/s12043-006-0041-x. S2CID 122633858.
- N. Kumar; K. Vijay Kumar (2008). "Classical Langevin dynamics of a charged particle moving on a sphere and diamagnetism: A surprise". EPL. 86 (1) 17001. arXiv:0811.3071. Bibcode:2009EL.....8617001K. doi:10.1209/0295-5075/86/17001. ISSN 0295-5075. S2CID 5346567.
- Dibyendu Roy; N. Kumar (2008). "Decohering d-dimensional quantum resistance". Physical Review B. 77 (6) 064201. arXiv:0709.2503. Bibcode:2008PhRvB..77f4201R. doi:10.1103/PhysRevB.77.064201. S2CID 67838506.
- N. Kumar (2012). "Classical orbital magnetic moment in a dissipative stochastic system". Physical Review E. 85 (1) 011114. arXiv:1110.4749. Bibcode:2012PhRvE..85a1114K. doi:10.1103/PhysRevE.85.011114. PMID 22400519. S2CID 1670882.

== See also ==
- Langevin dynamics
- Order and disorder
- Stochastic process
- Bose–Einstein condensate
