= 2022–23 Senior Women's National Football Championship =

2022–23 Women's National Football Championship
Tournament details
- Country: India
- Dates: 22 March – 28 June 2023
- Teams: 32

Final positions
- Champions: Tamil Nadu (2nd title)
- Runners-up: Haryana

Tournament statistics
- Matches played: 95
- Goals scored: 420 (4.42 per match)
- Top goal scorer: Anju (Himachal Pradesh) (13 goals)

The 2022–23 Senior Women's National Football Championship, also known as Hero Senior Women's National Football Championship for sponsorship reasons, was the 27th edition of the Senior Women's National Football Championship, the premier competition in India for women's teams representing regional and state football associations.

Tamil Nadu, won their second title after beating Haryana 2–1`in the final.

== Format ==
Thirty-one teams have been divided into six groups in the qualifying round, which will be played in six different venues across the country. The Final Round of the competition will have a total of 12 teams - six group winners, five best runners-up, and the Railways, who have been given direct entry. The 12 teams will be divided into two groups of six each. The top two teams from each group will qualify for the semi-finals.

=== Schedule ===
Matchday	Dates					
Matchday	Group I	Group II	Group III	Group IV	Group V	Group VI
Matchday 1	28 March 2023	27, 28 March 2023	25 March 2023	26, 27 March 2023	25 March 2023	29 March 2023
Matchday 2	30 March 2023	30, 31 March 2023	27 March 2023	29, 30 March 2023	27 March 2023	31 March 2023
Matchday 3	1 April 2023	2, 3 April 2023	29 March 2023	1, 2 April 2023	29 March 2023	2 April 2023
Matchday 4		5, 6 April 2023	31 March 2023	4, 5 April 2023		4 April 2023
Matchday 5		8, 9 April 2023	2 April 2023	7, 8 April 2023		6 April 2023

=== Centralised venues ===
- Group I → GNDU Sports Complex, Amritsar, Punjab
- Group II → IGIS Complex, Haldwani/Rudrapur, Uttarakhand
- Group III → Navelim and Benaulim, South Goa, Goa
- Group IV → Pant Stadium, Bhilai, Chhattisgarh
- Group V → Sports Ground, Hindustan College of Science and Technology, Mathura, Uttar Pradesh
- Group VI → Bangalore Football Stadium, Bengaluru, Karnataka

== Group stage ==
=== Group I ===
Pos	Team	Pld	W	D	L	GF	GA	GD	Pts	Qualification
1	Haryana	3	2	1	0	12	0	+12	7	Advance to Final Round
2	Punjab (H)	3	1	2	0	6	1	+5	5	Advance to Final Round
3	Sikkim	3	1	1	1	6	7	−1	4	
4	Telangana	3	0	0	3	0	16	−16	0	

Source: AIFF
Rules for classification: 1) points; 2) goal difference; 3) goals scored; 4) head-to-head result.
(H) Hosts

28 March 2023	Telangana	0–6	Haryana	Amritsar
09:00 IST		Report	Neha 27', 64', 78'; Mona 28'; Santosh 32'; Tannu 52'	Stadium: GNDU Sports Complex; Attendance: 50; Referee: Rajkumar Angousana Singh; Player of the Match: Neha (Haryana)

28 March 2023	Sikkim	1–1	Punjab	Amritsar
16:00 IST	Nimita Gurung 90+2'	Report	Karam Tony Devi 75'	Stadium: GNDU Sports Complex; Attendance: 100; Referee: Bimalendu Mondal; Player of the Match: Nimita Gurung (Sikkim)

30 March 2023	Haryana	6–0	Sikkim	Amritsar
09:00 IST	Santosh 35'; Samiksha 39', 63'; Neha 77', 80', 88'	Report		Stadium: GNDU Sports Complex; Attendance: 0 Referee: Alok Britto; Player of the Match: Neha (Haryana)

30 March 2023	Punjab	5–0	Telangana	Amritsar
16:00 IST	Neha Mann 13', 79'; Harmilan Kaur 45+3'; Karuna 78', 90+2' (pen.)	Report		Stadium: GNDU Sports Complex; Attendance: 50; Referee: R Kannan; Player of the Match: Neha Mann (Punjab)

1 April 2023	Telangana	0–5	Sikkim	Amritsar
09:00 IST		Report	Laxmi Thatal 12', 45+1', 58'; Samjana Rai 63'; Nimita Gurung 90+4'	Stadium: GNDU Sports Complex; Attendance: 0 Referee: Bimalendu Mondal; Player of the Match: Nimita Gurung (Sikkim)

1 April 2023	Haryana	0–0	Punjab	Amritsar
16:00 IST		Report		Stadium: GNDU Sports Complex; Attendance: 100; Referee: Pranay Saha; Player of the Match: Sita Sharma (Punjab)

=== Group II ===
Pos	Team	Pld	W	D	L	GF	GA	GD	Pts	Qualification
1	Maharashtra	5	4	0	1	10	2	+8	12	Advance to Final Round
2	Chandigarh	5	3	2	0	11	2	+9	11	Advance to Final Round
3	Kerala	5	3	0	2	15	7	+8	9	
4	Uttarakhand (H)	5	2	1	2	11	8	+3	7	
5	Pondicherry	5	0	2	3	2	14	−12	2	
6	Mizoram	5	0	1	4	4	20	−16	1	

Source: AIFF
Rules for classification: 1) points; 2) goal difference; 3) goals scored; 4) head-to-head result.
(H) Hosts

27 March 2023	Uttarakhand	0–0	Chandigarh	Haldwani
15:00 IST		Report		Stadium: IGIS Complex; Player of the Match: Pallavi Rawat (Uttarakhand)

28 March 2023	Pondicherry	0–6	Kerala	Haldwani
09:00 IST		Report	P Reshma 20', 43'; Manasa K 35'; Malavika P 66'; C Reshma 70'; Sreelakshmi A G 90+4'	Stadium: IGIS Complex; Player of the Match: P Reshma (Kerala)

28 March 2023	Maharashtra	5–1	Mizoram	Haldwani
15:00 IST	Sapna Rajpure 14'; Arya More 36'; Bhumika Mane 45+2', 70'; Sanika Patil 55'	Report	Deborah Lalenpuii 52'	Stadium: IGIS Complex; Player of the Match: Sonali Chemate (Maharashtra)

30 March 2023	Kerala	6–2	Uttarakhand	Haldwani
09:00 IST	Femina Raj Valappil 15'; P Reshma 40', 84', 86'; Sivisha C 48'; Malavika P 89'	Report	Anjana Thapa 46'; Aditi Parmar 54'	Stadium: IGIS Complex; Player of the Match: P Reshma (Kerala)

30 March 2023	Chandigarh	6–1	Mizoram	Haldwani
15:00 IST	Anay Bai 2'; Yati Mehta 11'; Shivani 14', 90+4'; Vedika Gulia 25'; Santosh 70'	Report	Lalfakmawii (45+!)	Stadium: IGIS Complex; Player of the Match: Shivani (Chandigarh)

31 March 2023	Pondicherry	0–2	Maharashtra	Haldwani
15:00 IST		Report	Arya More 20', 21'	Stadium: IGIS Complex; Player of the Match: Arya More (Maharashtra)

2 April 2023	Uttarakhand	5–0	Mizoram	Haldwani
09:00 IST	Bhagwati Chauhan 20', 43'; Aditi Parmar 31'; Anjana Thapa 54'; Anjali Chhetri 55'	Report		Stadium: IGIS Complex; Player of the Match: Bhagwati Chauhan (Uttarakhand)

2 April 2023	Kerala	0–1	Maharashtra	Haldwani
15:00 IST		Report	Afreen Peerbhoy 45+1'	Stadium: IGIS Complex; Player of the Match: Afreen Peerbhoy (Maharashtra)

3 April 2023	Chandigarh	1–1	Pondicherry	Haldwani
15:00 IST	Kavita Devi 18'	Report	Mrithula Palin Gm 31'	Stadium: IGIS Complex; Player of the Match: Priyanka (Chandigarh)

5 April 2023	Mizoram	1–1	Pondicherry	Haldwani
09:00 IST	Zonuntluangi 45+2'	Report	Prabavathi M 61'	Stadium: IGIS Complex; Player of the Match: Akila (Pondicherry)

5 April 2023	Uttarakhand	0–2	Maharashtra	Haldwani
15:00 IST		Report	Arya More 3', 49'	Stadium: IGIS Complex; Player of the Match: Arya More (Maharashtra)

6 April 2023	Kerala	0–3	Chandigarh	Haldwani
15:00 IST		Report	Santosh 14'; Ritu 42'; Disha 85'	Stadium: IGIS Complex; Player of the Match: Ritu (Chandigarh)

8 April 2023	Maharashtra	0–1	Chandigarh	Haldwani
09:00 IST		Report	Ritu 35'	Stadium: IGIS Complex; Player of the Match: Yati Mehta (Chandigarh)

8 April 2023	Mizoram	1–3	Kerala	Haldwani
15:00 IST	Lalnun Tluangi 58'	Report	Sivisha C 11'; Benita Solo 19' (o.g.); P Reshma 87'	Stadium: IGIS Complex; Player of the Match: Sivisha C (Kerala)

9 April 2023	Pondicherry	0–4	Uttarakhand	Haldwani
15:00 IST		Report	Bhagwati Chauhan 7'; Anjali Chhetri 38', 55', 60'	Stadium: IGIS Complex; Player of the Match: Anjali Chhetri (Uttarakhand)

=== Group III ===
Pos	Team	Pld	W	D	L	GF	GA	GD	Pts	Qualification
1	Himachal Pradesh	4	3	1	0	41	4	+37	10	Advance to Final Round
2	Odisha	4	2	2	0	24	4	+20	8	Advance to Final Round
3	Goa (H)	4	2	1	1	13	5	+8	7	
4	Andhra Pradesh	4	1	0	3	3	36	−33	3	
5	Rajasthan	4	0	0	4	0	32	−32	0	

Source: AIFF
Rules for classification: 1) points; 2) goal difference; 3) goals scored; 4) head-to-head result.
(H) Hosts

25 March 2023	Andhra Pradesh	0–8	Odisha	Margao
08:00 IST		Report	Sumitra Hembram 17'; Deepa Nayak 17', 28'; Grace Lalrampari Hauhnar 43'; Malati Munda 45', 45+2', 50'; Jasoda Munda 53'	Stadium: Fatorda Stadium; Player of the Match: Jasoda Munda (Odisha)

25 March 2023	Rajasthan	0–3	Goa	Margao
16:30 IST		Report	Karen Estrocio 30', 46'; Velanie Fernandes 64'	Stadium: Fatorda Stadium; Player of the Match: Karen Estrocio (Goa)

27 March 2023	Odisha	3–3	Himachal Pradesh	Margao
08:00 IST	Malati Munda 2'; Jasoda Munda 20'; Sumitra Hembram 32'	Report	Riya Sharma 26'; Poonam 53'; Anju 70'	Stadium: Fatorda Stadium; Player of the Match: Poonam (Himachal Pradesh)

27 March 2023	Andhra Pradesh	2–0	Rajasthan	Margao
16:00 IST	Tamatapu Aruna 70', 73'	Report		Stadium: Fatorda Stadium; Player of the Match: Tamatapu Aruna (Andhra Pradesh)

29 March 2023	Himachal Pradesh	4–0	Goa	Margao
08:00 IST	Riya Sharma 11'; Nisha 50'; Ritu Devi 67'; Anju 81'	Report		Stadium: Fatorda Stadium; Player of the Match: Riya Sharma (Himachal Pradesh)

29 March 2023	Odisha	12–0	Rajasthan	Margao
16:00 IST	Jasoda Munda 11', 58', 90+4', 90+6'; Malati Munda 23', 33'; Bannya Kabiraj 45+3', 72'; Niketa Bishi 52'; Bharati Das 57'; Srijana Tamang 71'; Sumitra Hembram 80'	Report		Stadium: Fatorda Stadium; Player of the Match: Jasoda Munda (Odisha)

31 March 2023	Rajasthan	0–15	Himachal Pradesh	Margao
08:00 IST		Report	Poonam 21', 37', 49', 81', 90+2'; Manisha 24', 55', 68'; Nisha 29', 44', 57', 79'; Anju 33', 83'; Naketa 59'	Stadium: Fatorda Stadium; Player of the Match: Nisha (Himachal Pradesh)

31 March 2023	Goa	9–0	Andhra Pradesh	Margao
16:00 IST	Sushmita Jadhav 6', 17', 52'; Karen Estrocio 10', 22', 32', 49', 55'; Namita Shripad Govekar 39'	Report		Stadium: Fatorda Stadium; Player of the Match: Karen Estrocio (Goa)

2 April 2023	Himachal Pradesh	19–1	Andhra Pradesh	Margao
08:00 IST	Riya Sharma 9', 60'; Nisha 13'; Anju 15', 45+1', 45+2', 53', 62', 65', 69'; Manisha 18', 37', 64'; Poonam 23', 28', 41', 43'; Naketa 56', 83'	Report	Kolluru Anuradha 24'	Stadium: Fatorda Stadium; Player of the Match: Anju (Himachal Pradesh)

2 April 2023	Goa	1–1	Odisha	Margao
16:00 IST	Karen Estrocio 45'	Report	Satyabati Khadia 65'	Stadium: Fatorda Stadium; Player of the Match: Karen Estrocio (Goa)

=== Group IV ===
Pos	Team	Pld	W	D	L	GF	GA	GD	Pts	Qualification
1	Jharkhand	5	5	0	0	21	2	+19	15	Advance to Final Round
2	Delhi	5	3	1	1	16	4	+12	10	
3	Madhya Pradesh	5	3	0	2	9	5	+4	9	
4	Chhattisgarh (H)	5	2	1	2	18	5	+13	7	
5	Ladakh	5	1	0	4	3	16	−13	3	
6	Jammu and Kashmir	5	0	0	5	1	36	−35	0	

Source: AIFF
Rules for classification: 1) points; 2) goal difference; 3) goals scored; 4) head-to-head result.
(H) Hosts

26 March 2023	Jharkhand	2–0	Chhattisgarh	Bhilai
09:00 IST	Kusma Kispotta 1', 80'	Report		Stadium: Pant Stadium; Player of the Match: Anjali Munda (Jharkhand)

26 March 2023	Ladakh	0–6	Delhi	Bhilai
16:00 IST		Report	Fragrancy Riwan 23'; Ruchi 34', 70'; Deepika Venkatesh 38', 82'; Jyoti 63'	Stadium: Pant Stadium; Player of the Match: Ruchi (Delhi)

27 March 2023	Jammu and Kashmir	0–6	Madhya Pradesh	Bhilai
16:00 IST		Report	Ayushi Malvi 24'; Madhu Raghav 35', 52'; Neha Mukati 40'; Piyali Kora 42'; Payal 90+4'	Stadium: Pant Stadium; Player of the Match: Madhu Raghav (Madhya Pradesh)

29 March 2023	Ladakh	0–4	Jharkhand	Bhilai
08:00 IST		Report	Komal Kumari 15'; Mamta Kumari 24', 63'; Asha Kumari 43'	Stadium: Pant Stadium; Player of the Match: Mamta Kumari (Jharkhand)

29 March 2023	Delhi	5–0	Jammu and Kashmir	Bhilai
16:00 IST	Deepika Pal 18', 55'; Sanfida Nongrum 50'; Jyoti 85', 90+4'	Report		Stadium: Pant Stadium; Player of the Match: Jyoti (Delhi)

30 March 2023	Madhya Pradesh	2–0	Chhattisgarh	Bhilai
16:00 IST	Neha Mukati 50'; Payal 73'	Report		Stadium: Pant Stadium; Player of the Match: Jyosana Toppo (Madhya Pradesh)

1 April 2023	Jammu and Kashmir	0–13	Chhattisgarh	Bhilai
08:00 IST		Report	Ripika Korram 8', 31', 45'; Kiran Pisda 10', 33', 45+3'; Shubhangi Subba 16', 58'; Masipogu Puspa 27', 55', 63'; Nisha Bhoi 43'; Jagriti Nirmalkar 90+3'	Stadium: Pant Stadium; Player of the Match: Kiran Pisda (Chhattisgarh)

1 April 2023	Delhi	2–3	Jharkhand	Bhilai
16:00 IST	Jyoti 33'; Sanfida Nongrum 66'	Report	Kusma Kispotta 48'; Asha Kumari 62'; Anjali Gari 78'	Stadium: Pant Stadium; Player of the Match: Anjali Gari (Jharkhand)

2 April 2023	Madhya Pradesh	1–0	Ladakh	Bhilai
16:00 IST	Neha Mukati 44'	Report		Stadium: Pant Stadium; Player of the Match: Neha Mukati (Madhya Pradesh)

4 April 2023	Jharkhand	9–0	Jammu and Kashmir	Bhilai
08:00 IST	Komal Kumari 11', 43'; Mamta Kumari 13', 29'; Asha Kumari 41', 78'; Anjali Gari 45+2'; Chamni Kumari 49'; Dolly Kumari 54'	Report		Stadium: Pant Stadium; Player of the Match: Mamta Kumari (Jharkhand)

4 April 2023	Delhi	2–0	Madhya Pradesh	Bhilai
16:00 IST	Neha Mukati 35' (o.g.); Ruchi 71'	Report		Stadium: Pant Stadium; Player of the Match: Sanfida Nongrum (Delhi)

5 April 2023	Chhattisgarh	4–0	Ladakh	Bhilai
16:00 IST	Ripika Korram 11'; Masipogu Puspa 33', 61'; Pinki Kashyap 48'	Report		Stadium: Pant Stadium; Player of the Match: Pinki Kashyap (Chhattisgarh)

7 April 2023	Chhattisgarh	1–1	Delhi	Bhilai
16:00 IST	Kiran Pisda 36'	Report	Ruchi 90+4'	Stadium: Pant Stadium; Player of the Match: Kiran Pisda (Chhattisgarh)

8 April 2023	Jammu and Kashmir	1–3	Ladakh	Bhilai
08:00 IST	Zaara Riaz 50'	Report	Jigmet Chuzen 45+3', 72', 81'	Stadium: Pant Stadium; Player of the Match: Jigmet Chuzen (Ladakh)

8 April 2023	Jharkhand	3–0	Madhya Pradesh	Bhilai
16:00 IST	Asha Kumari 16'; Kusma Kispotta 78', 90+5'	Report		Stadium: Pant Stadium; Player of the Match: Kusma Kispotta (Jharkhand)

=== Group V ===
Pos	Team	Pld	W	D	L	GF	GA	GD	Pts	Qualification
1	Tamil Nadu	3	3	0	0	15	0	+15	9	Advance to Final Round
2	West Bengal	3	2	0	1	11	4	+7	6	Advance to Final Round
3	Arunachal Pradesh	3	1	0	2	3	7	−4	3	
4	Uttar Pradesh (H)	3	0	0	3	0	18	−18	0	

Source: AIFF
Rules for classification: 1) points; 2) goal difference; 3) goals scored; 4) head-to-head result.
(H) Hosts

25 March 2023	West Bengal	3–0	Arunachal Pradesh	Mathura
09:00 IST	Titli Sarkar 31'; Mousumi Murmu 45+1'; Rimpa Haldar 90+3'	Report		Stadium: Hindustan College of Science and Technology Ground; Attendance: 50; Referee: Usha; Player of the Match: Titli Sarkar (West Bengal)

25 March 2023	Uttar Pradesh	0–7	Tamil Nadu	Mathura
15:30 IST		Report	Muskan Khan 10' (o.g.); Priyadharshini S. 17', 44'; Malavika M 31'; Boya Dasari Anitha 78'; Shanmugapriya S 85'; Iswarya S 89'	Stadium: Hindustan College of Science and Technology Ground; Attendance: 50; Referee: Sen Hangma Subba; Player of the Match: Priyadharshini S. (Tamil Nadu)

27 March 2023	Tamil Nadu	4–0	West Bengal	Mathura
09:00 IST	Malavika M 34', 79'; Priyadharshini S. 43'; Yuvarani R 82'	Report		Stadium: Hindustan College of Science and Technology Ground; Attendance: 37; Referee: Phurki Lhamu Bhutia; Player of the Match: Malavika M (Tamil Nadu)

27 March 2023	Arunachal Pradesh	3–0	Uttar Pradesh	Mathura
15:30 IST	Tamchi Yapi 27'; Papung Bodo 30'; Giani Ramching Mara 64'	Report		Stadium: Hindustan College of Science and Technology Ground; Attendance: 47; Referee: Kusum Mandi; Player of the Match: Tamchi Yapi (Arunachal Pradesh)

29 March 2023	Tamil Nadu	4–0	Arunachal Pradesh	Mathura
09:00 IST	Priyadharshini S. 4'; Sandhiya P 10', 17', 47'	Report		Stadium: Hindustan College of Science and Technology Ground; Attendance: 27; Referee: Neetu Rana; Player of the Match: Sandhiya P (Tamil Nadu)

29 March 2023	Uttar Pradesh	0–8	West Bengal	Mathura
15:30 IST		Report	Singo Murmu 8', 39'; Mousumi Murmu 21', 52'; Sushmita Lepcha 22'; Titli Sarkar 23'; Sibani Sharma 71'; Rubina Khatun 81'	Stadium: Hindustan College of Science and Technology Ground; Attendance: 175; Referee: Sen Hangma Subba; Player of the Match: Mousumi Murmu (West Bengal)

=== Group VI ===
Pos	Team	Pld	W	D	L	GF	GA	GD	Pts	Qualification
1	Manipur	4	4	0	0	18	4	+14	12	Advance to Final Round
2	Karnataka (H)	4	3	0	1	22	6	+16	9	Advance to Final Round
3	Gujarat	4	2	0	2	6	15	−9	6	
4	Assam	4	1	0	3	12	9	+3	3	
5	Bihar	4	0	0	4	1	25	−24	0	

Source: AIFF
Rules for classification: 1) points; 2) goal difference; 3) goals scored; 4) head-to-head result.
(H) Hosts

29 March 2023	Bihar	0–5	Manipur	Bengaluru
08:00 IST		Report	Salam Rinaroy Devi 7', 40', 52'; S Lynda Kom 45+3', 90+2'	Stadium: Bangalore Football Stadium; Player of the Match: Salam Rinaroy Devi (Manipur)

29 March 2023	Gujarat	1–9	Karnataka	Bengaluru
16:00 IST	Khushbu Saroj 49'	Report	Maitreyi Palasamudram 7', 9', 25', 39', 45+2', 90+1'; Monalisha Marandi 21'; Kaviya Pakkirisamy 22', 45+1'	Stadium: Bangalore Football Stadium; Player of the Match: Maitreyi Palasamudram (Karnataka)

31 March 2023	Bihar	0–3	Gujarat	Bengaluru
08:00 IST		Report	Khushbu Saroj 40', 50', 66'	Stadium: Bangalore Football Stadium; Player of the Match: Khushbu Saroj (Gujarat)

31 March 2023	Assam	1–3	Karnataka	Bengaluru
16:00 IST	Yangoijam Kiranbala Chanu 87'	Report	Maitreyi Palasamudram 9'; Sonia Marak 13'; Sanjita Niroula 48'	Stadium: Bangalore Football Stadium; Player of the Match: Aruna Bag (Karnataka)

2 April 2023	Manipur	6–0	Gujarat	Bengaluru
08:00 IST	Irom Prameshwori Devi 29'; Moirangthem Mandakini Devi 34', 45+3', 65'; Kangabam Anita Devi 43'; S Lynda Kom 51'	Report		Stadium: Bangalore Football Stadium; Player of the Match: Moirangthem Mandakini Devi (Manipur)

2 April 2023	Assam	9–1	Bihar	Bengaluru
16:00 IST	Yangoijam Kiranbala Chanu 9', 78'; Yumkhaibam Hemolata Devi 34'; Thingbaijam Babysana Devi 39', 90+2'; Maibam Promila Devi 48', 77'; Ningthoujam Roni Devi 67', 90'	Report	Nisha Kumari 73'	Stadium: Bangalore Football Stadium; Player of the Match: Ningthoujam Roni Devi (Assam)

4 April 2023	Manipur	3–2	Assam	Bengaluru
08:00 IST	Moirangthem Mandakini Devi 15'; Salam Rinaroy Devi 61'; S Lynda Kom 89'	Report	Ningthoujam Roni Devi 30'; Yumkhaibam Hemolata Devi 36'	Stadium: Bangalore Football Stadium; Player of the Match: S Lynda Kom (Manipur)

4 April 2023	Karnataka	8–0	Bihar	Bengaluru
16:00 IST	Kaviya Pakkirisamy 27', 51', 58'; Tara Anand 28'; Maitreyi Palasamudram 42'; Aruna Bag 45+3'; Sonia Marak 49', 64'	Report		Stadium: Bangalore Football Stadium; Player of the Match: Kaviya Pakkirisamy (Karnataka)

6 April 2023	Gujarat	2–0	Assam	Bengaluru
08:00 IST	Khushbu Saroj 60', 90+1'	Report		Stadium: Bangalore Football Stadium; Player of the Match: Anjanaben Bhuraji Thakor (Gujarat)

6 April 2023	Karnataka	2–4	Manipur	Bengaluru
16:00 IST	Kaviya Pakkirisamy 32'; Aruna Bag 44'	Report	Moirangthem Mandakini Devi 5'; Heigrujam Daya Devi 48', 49'; S Lynda Kom 83'	Stadium: Bangalore Football Stadium; Player of the Match: Heigrujam Daya Devi (Manipur)

== Final Round ==
Final Round will have a total of 12 teams - six group winners, four best runners-up, hosts Punjab and the Railways, who have been given direct entry. The 12 teams will be divided into two groups of six each. The top two teams from each group will qualify for the semi-finals.

=== Qualified teams ===
- Railways (Automatic qualification)
- Punjab (Hosts)
- Haryana (Group I winners)
- Maharashtra (Group II winners)
- Himachal Pradesh (Group III winners)
- Jharkhand (Group IV winners)
- Tamil Nadu (Group V winners)
- Manipur (Group VI winners)
- Chandigarh (Group II runners-up)
- Odisha (Group III runners-up)
- West Bengal (Group V runners-up)
- Karnataka (Group VI runners-up)

=== Group A ===
Pos	Team	Pld	W	D	L	GF	GA	GD	Pts	Qualification
1	Tamil Nadu	5	5	0	0	17	0	+17	15	Advance to Knockout Stage
2	Odisha	5	4	0	1	13	3	+10	12	Advance to Knockout Stage
3	Jharkhand	5	1	1	3	4	7	−3	4	
4	Chandigarh	5	1	1	3	2	7	−5	4	
5	Karnataka	5	1	1	3	3	13	−10	4	
6	Punjab (H)	5	0	3	2	2	11	−9	3	

Source: AIFF
Rules for classification: 1) points; 2) head-to-head points; 3) head-to-head goal difference; 4) head-to-head goals scored; 5) goal difference; 6) number of goals scored; 7) fair play ranking; 8) drawing of lots
(H) Hosts

14 June 2023	Odisha	2–0	Jharkhand	Ludhiana
07:30 IST	Pyari Xaxa 7'; Karishma Oram 65'	Report		Stadium: Guru Nanak Stadium; Attendance: 100; Referee: Pooja S Player of the Match: Karishma Oram (Odisha)

14 June 2023	Chandigarh	0–0	Punjab	Ludhiana
16:30 IST		Report		Stadium: Guru Nanak Stadium; Attendance: 150; Referee: Ranjita Devi Tekcham; Player of the Match: Priyanka (Punjab)

14 June 2023	Tamil Nadu	4–0	Karnataka	Amritsar
16:30 IST	Indumathi Kathiresan 45+3'; Sandhiya Ranganathan 49', 79'; Yuvarani R 60'	Report		Stadium: GNDU Sports Complex; Player of the Match: Sandhiya Ranganathan (Tamil Nadu)

17 June 2023	Punjab	1–1	Karnataka	Amritsar
07:30 IST	Neha Mann 48'	Report	Maitreyi Palasamudram 56'	Stadium: GNDU Sports Complex; Player of the Match: Aiswarya A (Karnataka)

17 June 2023	Tamil Nadu	3–0	Odisha	Amritsar
16:30 IST	Sandhiya Ranganathan 22'; Indumathi Kathiresan 39', 75'	Report		Stadium: GNDU Sports Complex; Player of the Match: Indumathi Kathiresan (Tamil Nadu)

17 June 2023	Chandigarh	1–0	Jharkhand	Ludhiana
16:30 IST	Yati Mehta 83'	Report		Stadium: Guru Nanak Stadium; Player of the Match: Nitu Linda (Jharkhand)

19 June 2023	Karnataka	2–1	Chandigarh	Amritsar
07:30 IST	Sunalinda Lawren 58'; Aarushi Santhosh 78'	Report	Santosh 88'	Stadium: GNDU Sports Complex; Player of the Match: Sunalinda Lawren (Karnataka)

19 June 2023	Jharkhand	0–3	Tamil Nadu	Amritsar
16:30 IST		Report	Priyadharshini S 14', 32'; Malavika M 19'	Stadium: GNDU Sports Complex; Player of the Match: Priyadharshini S (Tamil Nadu)

19 June 2023	Punjab	0–5	Odisha	Ludhiana
16:30 IST		Report	Jasoda Munda 12'; Satyabati Khadia 36', 68'; Subhadra Sahoo 47', 75'	Stadium: Guru Nanak Stadium; Player of the Match: Satyabati Khadia (Odisha)

21 June 2023	Odisha	4–0	Karnataka	Amritsar
07:30 IST	Jasoda Munda 34', 38', 55'; Malati Munda 44'	Report		Stadium: GNDU Sports Complex; Player of the Match: Jasoda Munda (Odisha)

21 June 2023	Jharkhand	1–1	Punjab	Amritsar
16:30 IST	Sudha Ankita Tirkey 79'	Report	Nisha 6'	Stadium: GNDU Sports Complex; Player of the Match: Sudha Ankita Tirkey (Jharkhand)

21 June 2023	Tamil Nadu	3–0	Chandigarh	Ludhiana
16:30 IST	Indumathi Kathiresan 9'; Sandhiya Ranganathan 28'; Priyadharshini S 38'	Report		Stadium: Guru Nanak Stadium; Player of the Match: Indumathi Kathiresan (Tamil Nadu)

23 June 2023	Chandigarh	0–2	Odisha	Amritsar
07:30 IST		Report	Satyabati Khadia 27', 87'	Stadium: GNDU Sports Complex; Player of the Match: Satyabati Khadia (Odisha)

23 June 2023	Punjab	0–4	Tamil Nadu	Amritsar
16:30 IST		Report	Indumathi Kathiresan 3', 14', 33'; Yuvarani R 43'	Stadium: GNDU Sports Complex; Player of the Match: Indumathi Kathiresan (Tamil Nadu)

23 June 2023	Karnataka	0–3	Jharkhand	Ludhiana
16:30 IST		Report	Kusma Kispotta 7'; Asha Kumari 42', 73'	Stadium: Guru Nanak Stadium; Player of the Match: Asha Kumari (Jharkhand)

=== Group B ===
Pos	Team	Pld	W	D	L	GF	GA	GD	Pts	Qualification
1	Haryana	5	4	1	0	11	3	+8	13	Advance to Knockout Stage
2	Railways	5	4	0	1	15	3	+12	12	Advance to Knockout Stage
3	Manipur	5	3	0	2	11	6	+5	9	
4	West Bengal	5	2	1	2	13	10	+3	7	
5	Himachal Pradesh	5	1	0	4	4	18	−14	3	
6	Maharashtra	5	0	0	5	2	16	−14	0	

Source: AIFF
Rules for classification: 1) points; 2) head-to-head points; 3) head-to-head goal difference; 4) head-to-head goals scored; 5) goal difference; 6) number of goals scored; 7) fair play ranking; 8) drawing of lots

16 June 2023	Maharashtra	1–3	Manipur	Amritsar
07:30 IST	Arya More 34'	Report	Grace Dangmei 24'; Heigrujam Daya Devi 47', 54'	Stadium: GNDU Sports Complex; Attendance: 50; Referee: Usha; Player of the Match: Heigrujam Daya Devi (Manipur)

16 June 2023	Railways	1–2	Haryana	Amritsar
16:30 IST	Anju Tamang 80'	Report	Santosh 35'; Tannu 49'	Stadium: GNDU Sports Complex; Attendance: 50; Referee: G Ruba Devi; Player of the Match: Santosh (Haryana)

16 June 2023	Himachal Pradesh	0–4	West Bengal	Ludhiana
16:30 IST		Report	Barnali Karar 20'; Rimpa Haldar 47', 66'; Mousumi Murmu 54'	Stadium: Guru Nanak Stadium; Attendance: 0 Referee: Neetu Rana; Player of the Match: Rimpa Haldar (West Bengal)

18 June 2023	Manipur	3–2	West Bengal	Amritsar
07:30 IST	Bala Devi 17'; Lynda Kom 40', 52'	Report	Mousumi Murmu 44'; Sangita Basfore 71'	Stadium: GNDU Sports Complex; Attendance: 50; Referee: Kumari Nandita; Player of the Match: Lynda Kom (Manipur)

18 June 2023	Himachal Pradesh	1–7	Railways	Amritsar
16:30 IST	Manisha 40'	Report	Mamta 38', 50'; Yumnam Kamala Devi 47', 62'; Anju Tamang 67'; Diparnita Dey 72'; Jabamani Tudu 73'	Stadium: GNDU Sports Complex; Attendance: 50; Referee: G Ruba Devi; Player of the Match: Yumnam Kamala Devi (Railways)

18 June 2023	Maharashtra	0–4	Haryana	Ludhiana
16:30 IST		Report	Renu Rani 34', 48'; Santosh 86'; Ritu Rani 90+3'	Stadium: Guru Nanak Stadium; Attendance: 50; Referee: Pooja S Player of the Match: Renu Rani (Haryana)

20 June 2023	West Bengal	5–0	Maharashtra	Amritsar
07:30 IST	Sangita Basfore 33'; Rimpa Haldar 45+1'; Ratna Haldar 71'; Dular Marandi 74', 81'	Report		Stadium: GNDU Sports Complex; Attendance: 50; Referee: Harsha Saini; Player of the Match: Sangita Basfore (West Bengal)

20 June 2023	Haryana	1–0	Himachal Pradesh	Amritsar
16:30 IST	Aarti 70'	Report		Stadium: GNDU Sports Complex; Attendance: 50; Referee: Sen Hangma Subba; Player of the Match: Aarti (Haryana)

20 June 2023	Manipur	0–1	Railways	Ludhiana
16:30 IST		Report	Manisa Panna 39'	Stadium: Guru Nanak Stadium; Attendance: 200; Referee: Kumari Nandita; Player of the Match: Supriya Routray (Railways)

22 June 2023	Railways	5–0	West Bengal	Amritsar
07:30 IST	Yumnam Kamala Devi 27', 50'; Anju Tamang 29', 44'; Mamta 41'	Report		Stadium: GNDU Sports Complex; Attendance: 50; Referee: G Ruba Devi; Player of the Match: Anju Tamang (Railways)

22 June 2023	Haryana	2–0	Manipur	Amritsar
16:30 IST	Mona 13'; Renu Rani 19'	Report		Stadium: GNDU Sports Complex; Attendance: 50; Referee: Usha; Player of the Match: Renu Rani (Haryana)

22 June 2023	Himachal Pradesh	3–1	Maharashtra	Ludhiana
16:30 IST	Anju 17', 21'; Poonam 53'	Report	Arya More 43'	Stadium: Guru Nanak Stadium; Attendance: 70; Referee: Harsha Saini; Player of the Match: Anju (Himachal Pradesh)

24 June 2023	Maharashtra	0–1	Railways	Amritsar
07:30 IST		Report	Yumnam Kamala Devi 85'	Stadium: GNDU Sports Complex; Attendance: 50; Referee: Pooja S Player of the Match: Yumnam Kamala Devi (Railways)

24 June 2023	West Bengal	2–2	Haryana	Amritsar
16:30 IST	Dular Marandi 23'; Mousumi Murmu 58'	Report	Ritu Rani 44'; Tannu 80'	Stadium: GNDU Sports Complex; Attendance: 50; Referee: Kumari Nandita; Player of the Match: Mousumi Murmu (West Bengal)

24 June 2023	Manipur	5–0	Himachal Pradesh	Ludhiana
16:30 IST	Oinam Babita Devi 8'; Yumlembam Pakpi Devi 35'; Irom Prameshwori Devi 39'; Oinam Babita Devi 60'; Maibam Nandeshwori Devi 66'	Report		Stadium: Guru Nanak Stadium; Attendance: 0 Referee: Monika Jana; Player of the Match: Oinam Babita Devi (Manipur)

== Knockout stage ==
=== Bracket ===
Semi-finals
Tamil Nadu	3
Railways	1
Haryana (p)	1 (2)
Odisha	1 (0)

Final
Tamil Nadu	2
Haryana	1

=== Semi-finals ===
26 June 2023	Tamil Nadu	3–1	Railways	Amritsar
09:30 IST	Priyadharshini S 3'; Supriya Routray 47' (o.g.); Indumathi Kathiresan 53'	Report	Diparnita Dey 90+3'	Stadium: GNDU Sports Complex; Attendance: 50; Referee: Usha; Player of the Match: Priyadharshini S (Tamil Nadu)

26 June 2023	Haryana	1–1 (2–0 p)	Odisha	Amritsar
16:30 IST	Ritu Rani 36'	Report	Jasoda Munda 65'	Stadium: GNDU Sports Complex; Attendance: 100; Referee: Pooja S Player of the Match: Shreya Hooda (Haryana)
	Penalties
	Santosh (penalty scored); Renu Rani (penalty scored); Sharda (penalty missed)		(penalty missed) Juli Kishan; (penalty missed) Satyabati Khadia; (penalty missed) Jasoda Munda; (penalty missed) Malati Munda

=== Final ===
28 June 2023	Tamil Nadu	2–1	Haryana	Ludhiana
16:30 IST	Priyadharshini S 57'; Indumathi Kathiresan 83' (pen.)	Report	Dhurga P 50' (o.g.)	Stadium: Guru Nanak Stadium; Attendance: 500; Referee: Monika Jana; Player of the Match: Priyadharshini S (Tamil Nadu)
