= Ritu Rani (footballer) =

Indian footballer

Personal information
- Date of birth: 25 May 1997 (age 29)
- Place of birth: Alakhpura, Haryana, India
- Position: Defender

Senior career*
Years	Team	Apps	(Gls)
2016–2020	FC Alakhpura	5	(0)
2021–2022	Gokulam Kerala	10	(0)
2022–2023	Mumbai Knights	7	(1)
2023	Kickstart	1	(0)

International career^{‡}
2019–2023	India	14	(0)
- * Club domestic league appearances and goals ‡ National team caps and goals as of 1 November 2023

Ritu Rani (born 25 May 1997) is an Indian professional footballer who played as a defender for the India national football team.

== Club career ==
Ritu has played for FC Alakhpura, Gokulam Keralam, Mumbai Knights and currently plays for Kickstart in India.

== International career ==
Ritu was called up for the national team for the friendly matches in Malaysia in 2017. She capped for India at senior level during the 2019 Cotif Women's Tournament.

== Honours ==
India

- South Asian Games Gold medal: 2019

Gokulam Kerala

- Indian Women's League: 2021–22
- AFC Women's Club Championship third place: 2021

Haryana

- Rajmata Jijabai Trophy runner-up: 2022–23
