= Punaram Nishad =

Indian actor and musician

- Born: November 16, 1939 Kartik Mas Purnima; Ringni, Durg district, Chhattisgarh, India
- Died: November 11, 2017 (aged 77) Falgun Mas Navami; Dr B R Ambedkar Hospital, Raipur, Chhattisgarh
- Other name: Punaram
- Occupation: Folk musician
- Known for: Pandavani
- Spouse: Jamuna Nishad
- Children: Rohit Nishad
- Parent(s): Laxman Nishad & Budvanti Nishad
- Awards: 1975 - Tamra Padak Award 1975- Chhattisgarh Kala Samman, 2002 - Vilasa Samman, 2005 - Padma Shri
- Website: www.nishadbandhu.com

Punaram Nishad, born in Ringni, Durg district, Chhattisgarh, (16 November 1939 - 11 November 2017) was an Indian folk musician, known for his prowess in the Pandavani, a folk music tradition of Chhattisgarh and the neighbouring states in India.

== Early life ==
Born in the Indian state of Chhattisgarh, (then Madhya Pradesh) to a Bhajan singer, he started learning the art from the age of 10 under Jhadu Ram Dewangan, considered by many as the father of Pandvani, and aligned with the Vedamati tradition of Pandavani, which follows a rigid text, and does not permit improvisations.

Nishad has composed 18 stories for Pandavani, of which Udyog Parv is his favourite. He has acted in two plays, Agra Bazaar directed by Habib Tanvir, and a Naya Theatre production, Duryodhan. His performance has been staged during the Beyond the Border Festival Tour at Phoenix Arts Centre, Leicester on 28 June 1995. The Government of India awarded him the fourth highest civilian honour of the Padma Shri, in 2005, for his contributions to Indian folk arts. He lived in Ringni village of Durg district in Chhattisgarh and taught Pandavani at his residence, Shanti Niketan Ashram. His son, Rohit Nishad, is a farmer.

== See also ==
- Pandavani
- Teejan Bai
