= Usha Barle =

Indian pandavani singer

- Born: 2 May 1968 (age 58); Bhilai, Chhattisgarh
- Occupation: Pandavani Folk Singer
- Awards: Padma Shri 2023

Usha Barle (born 2 May 1968) is an Indian Pandavani folk singer, of a traditional performing folk art form, from Chhattisgarh. she is known for her performances in the Kapalik style.

== Early life ==
Barle was born in 1968 in Bhilai, Chahattisgarh. she started her Pandwani singing at the age of seven and later trained under Padma Vibhushan Teejanbai.

== Awards ==
In 2023 she received fourth highest civilian award in India the Padma Shri for her contributions to Pandwani singing, by Indian president Droupadi Murmu.
