= Anatole Abragam =

French physicist (1914–2011)

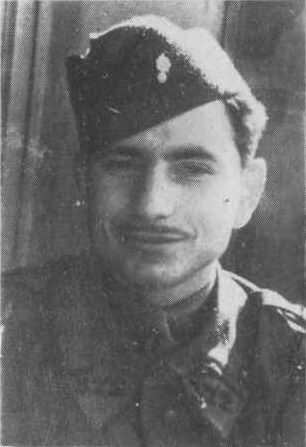
- Abragam in 1939
- Born: 15 December 1914; Griva, Courland Governorate, Russian Empire (now Latvia)
- Died: 8 June 2011 (aged 96)
- Education: University of Paris; Supélec; University of Oxford (Ph.D)
- Known for: The Principles of Nuclear Magnetism
- Awards: Holweck Medal (1958); Lorentz Medal (1982); Matteucci Medal (1992); Lomonosov Gold Medal (1995)
- Scientific career
- Fields: Nuclear magnetic resonance Electron paramagnetic resonance
- Thesis: Some magnetic properties of crystals (Theory) (1950)
- Doctoral advisor: Maurice Pryce
- Doctoral students: Michel Devoret

Anatole Abragam (15 December 1914 – 8 June 2011) was a French physicist who wrote The Principles of Nuclear Magnetism and made significant contributions to the field of nuclear magnetic resonance. Originally from Griva, Courland Governorate, Russian Empire, Abragam and his family emigrated to France in 1925.

== Education ==
After being educated at the University of Paris (1933–1936), he served in World War II. After the war, he resumed his studies at the École Supérieure d'Électricité and subsequently obtained his Ph.D. from the University of Oxford in 1950 under the supervision of Maurice Pryce.

== Career and research ==
In 1976, he was made an Honorary Fellow of Merton College, Oxford, Magdalen College, Oxford, and Jesus College, Oxford. From 1960 to 1985, he worked as a professor at the Collège de France.

=== Awards and honors ===
Abragam won the Fernand Holweck Medal and Prize in 1958. Abragam was elected a Foreign Honorary Member of the American Academy of Arts and Sciences in 1974. He was awarded the Lorentz Medal in 1982. He was elected a Foreign Member of the Royal Society (ForMemRS) in 1983.

A building in CEA Saclay is named after him; Bâtiment Anatole Abragam.

=== Books ===
- Abragam, Anatole (1961). The Principles of Nuclear Magnetism. Clarendon Press. p. 599. OCLC 242700.
- Abragam A & Bleaney B. Electron paramagnetic resonance of transition ions. Oxford, England: Oxford University Press, 1970.
- Abragam A & Goldman M. Nuclear Magnetism: Order and Disorder. Oxford, England: Clarendon Press, 1982.
- Abragam, Anatole (1986). Reflections of a Physicist [Réflexions d'un physicien (title of the Fr. original)]. Oxford: Clarendon Press. ISBN 0-19-851964-8.
- Abragam, Anatole (1989). Time Reversal, an autobiography [De la physique avant toute chose (title of the Fr. original)]. Oxford University Press. OCLC 18989324.
