= Krityunjai Prasad Sinha =

Indian theoretical physicist (1929–2023)

- Born: 5 July 1929; Akhtiyarpur, Bihar, India
- Died: 23 January 2023 (aged 93); Bengaluru, India
- Education: Allahabad University; Savitribai Phule Pune University; University of Bristol
- Known for: Studies on Solid state physics and Cosmology
- Awards: 1974 Shanti Swarup Bhatnagar Prize; 1975 MUM Physics Award; 1977 UoB Distinguished Alumnus award; 1984 IISc Platinum Jubilee Distinguished Alumni Award
- Scientific career
- Fields: Theoretical physics
- Workplaces: National Chemical Laboratory; Bell Labs; Indian Institute of Science; North Eastern Hill University; Harvard University; Massachusetts Institute of Technology
- Doctoral advisor: G. I. Finch; Maurice Pryce

Krityunjai Prasad Sinha (5 July 1929 – 23 January 2023) was an Indian theoretical physicist and an emeritus professor at the Indian Institute of Science. Known for his research in solid-state physics and cosmology, Sinha was elected a fellow of all the three major Indian science academies – the Indian National Science Academy, the Indian Academy of Sciences, and the National Academy of Sciences, India. In 1974, the Council of Scientific and Industrial Research, the apex agency of the Government of India for scientific research, awarded him the Shanti Swarup Bhatnagar Prize for Science and Technology, one of the highest honors in Indian science, in recognition of his contributions to the field of physical sciences. (Note: Long link – please select award year to see details)

== Biography ==
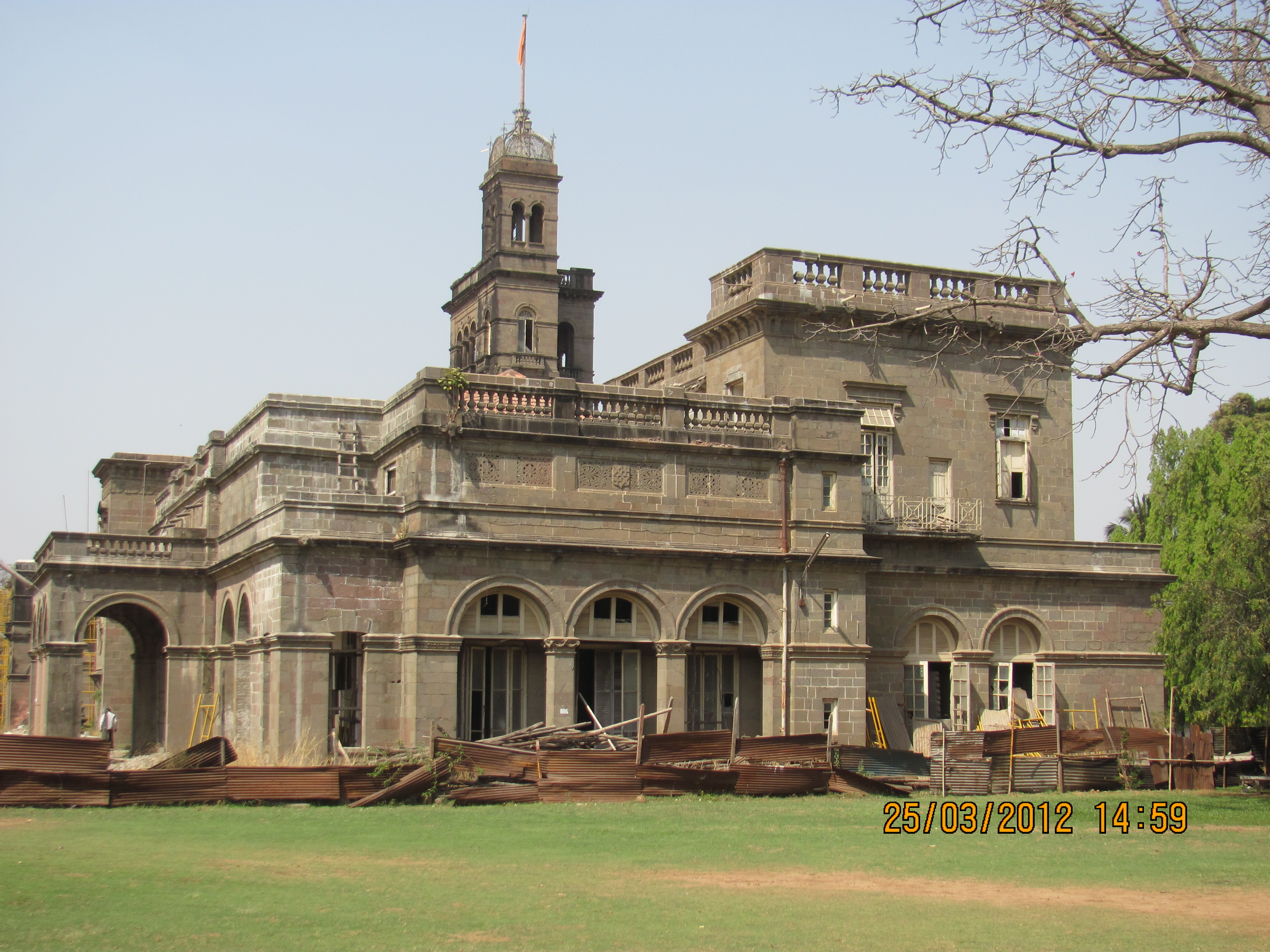
University of Pune

Born in Akhtiyarpur, in the Indian state of Bihar, KP Sinha passed his matriculation examination in 1944 and completed the intermediate studies in 1946 before joining Allahabad University to earn a BSc in 1948. Subsequently, on completion of his MSc in 1950 from the same institution, he enrolled at Savitribai Phule Pune University for his doctoral studies under the guidance of GI Finch and secured a PhD in solid state physics in 1956. Moving to the UK, Sinha did his post-doctoral work at the laboratory of Maurice Henry Lecorney Pryce during 1957–59, and his studies there in theoretical physics earned him a second PhD from the University of Bristol in 1965.

In 1959, Sinha had returned to India to join the National Chemical Laboratory as a group leader at the Solid State and Molecular Physics Unit. He carried out research there until 1968, when he had an opportunity to join Bell Labs in New Jersey. Sinha's stay at the Murray Hill facility lasted two years. On his return to India in 1970, he joined the Indian Institute of Science as a senior professor at the department of physics, commencing a service which would last over three and a half decades. During this period, Sinha chaired a number of divisions such as the Division of Applied Mathematics (1971–73 and 1975–77) and the Centre for Theoretical Studies (1972–73 and 1981–87) for two terms each, and the Division of Physics and Mathematics from 1972 to 1976. On his superannuation from regular service in 1990, Sinha continued his association with IISc as a senior scientist of the Indian National Science Academy (INSA) during 1990–93, as a distinguished scientist of the Council of Scientific and Industrial Research from 1996 to 1998, and as an INSA honorary scientist since 2006.

Besides holding the directorship of the Institute of Fundamental Research on Complex System of North Eastern Hill University during 1991–94, Sinha had two sabbaticals, starting with a summer stint at Lyman Laboratory of Physics of Harvard University in 1999. Later, he was associated with Charles Stark Draper Laboratory as a consultant and with Massachusetts Institute of Technology as a visiting scientist, both assignments running concurrently from 2000 to 2003. Sinha also served as a visiting faculty at International Centre for Theoretical Physics on four occasions (1970, 72, 76 and 83), at H. H. Wills Physics Lab of University of Bristol and Cavendish Laboratory of University of Cambridge during 1977–78, at University of Grenoble and University of Paris in 1983 and 1984, at Institute for Physical Problems and Institute of Theoretical Physics, Goteborg in 1986 and University of Western Ontario during 1987–88).

Sinha, who held the position of emeritus professor of the Indian Institute of Science since his superannuation, lived in Dollars Colony, in Bengaluru. He died there on 23 January 2023, at the age of 93.

== Legacy ==
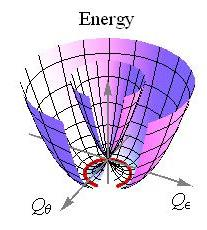
The potential energy surfaces of an E ⊗ e Jahn–Teller effect

Sinha's theoretical work covered various aspects of solid state physics and he has made significant contributions in the field of crystal magnetism. His early work during his doctoral and post-doctoral days was based on condensed matter theory, semiconductors, quantum well, Cold Fusion, phonons, and photon-induced effects in solids. Later, Sinha worked on the origin of giant magnetic moments as well as exciton and electron phase transitions in solids, and developed an electronic pairing mechanism related to bosons and biexcitons for predicting the phenomenon of photon. He elucidated superconductivity at high temperatures by way of a non-equilibrium mechanism and also developed a statistical theory on the origin of ferroelectricity and structural phase transitions induced by cooperative Jahn-Teller effect; his work on the magnetism is described in one of his books. The luminescence efficiency of solids, Ricci scalar curvature, super strong gravity, singularity free cosmology, and low energy nuclear reactions are some other areas he has worked on.

Sinha's studies have been documented by way of a number of articles, (Note: Please see Selected bibliography section) and online article repositories such as Google Scholar and ResearchGate have listed many of them. He has published 6 books which included Foundry Technology, Interactions in magnetically ordered solids, Aspects of Gravitational Interactions, High Temperature Superconductivity: Current Results and Novel Mechanisms and Magnetic superconductors: recent developments, and has contributed chapters to books published by others. His work has also drawn citations from a number of authors. and he has supervised the doctoral and post doctoral studies of 45 scholars.

Sinha is credited with initiating theoretical studies on condensed matter at a number of institutions in India and delivered the Deshmukh lecture of the University of Nagpur in 1995. He was an invited speaker at the 8th and 10th sessions of International Conference on Cold Fusion. Sinha served as the chapter chair of the Indian Physics Association during 1971–73 and as the president of Indian Cryogenic Council from 1990 to 1993. He is a member of the Indian Science Congress Association, American Physical Society, International Society on General Relativity and Gravitation, Society for Scientific Values, New York Academy of Sciences and American Association for the Advancement of Science.

== Awards and honours ==
Sinha, a founder fellow of the Indian Cryogenic Council, was elected as a fellow by the Indian Academy of Sciences in 1971 and he was selected as a national professor by the University Grants Commission of India in 1972, a post he held for one year. The Council of Scientific and Industrial Research awarded him the Shanti Swarup Bhatnagar Prize, one of the highest Indian science awards in 1974. Sinha received the Award for excellence in Physics of Maharishi University of Management in 1975 and H. H. Wills Physics Laboratory of University of Bristol honored him with the Distinguished Alumnus Award in 1977. The elected fellowships of the Indian National Science Academy and the National Academy of Sciences, India reached him in 1979 and 1982 respectively. Two years later, Sinha received the Platinum Jubilee Distinguished Alumnus Award of the Indian Institute of Science. World Who's Who in Science from Antiquity to the Present has been featuring Sinha since its 1976–77 edition.

== Selected bibliography ==
=== Books ===
- Gerald Duane Bailey; Krityunjai Prasad Sinha (1968). Foundry Technology. Roorkee Publishing House.
- Krityunjai Prasad Sinha; Narendra Kumar (1980). Interactions in magnetically ordered solids. Oxford University Press. ISBN 978-0198514237.
- Krityunjai Prasad Sinha; S. L. Kankani (1989). Magnetic superconductors: recent developments. Nova Science Publishers, Incorporated. ISBN 978-0-941743-62-4.
- Krityunjai Prasad Sinha; S. L. Kakani (1994). High Temperature Superconductivity: Current Results and Novel Mechanisms. Nova Science Publishers. ISBN 978-1-56072-133-8.
- Dr. S. K. Srivastava; Krityunjai Prasad Sinha (1 January 1998). Aspects of Gravitational Interactions. Nova Science Publishers. ISBN 978-1-56072-575-6.

=== Chapters ===
- Indian Institute of Science, Bangalore (1984). Research and development in physics & mathematical sciences. Indian Institute of Science.
- Davor Pavuna; Ivan Bozovic (1994). Oxide Superconductor Physics and Nano-engineering. SPIE. ISBN 9780819414533.
- Albert Reimer (2005). Spacetime Physics Research Trends. Nova Publishers. pp. 2–. ISBN 978-1-59454-322-7.

=== Articles ===
- K. P. Sinha, U. N. Upadhyaya (1962). "Phonon-Magnon Interaction in Magnetic Crystals". Phys. Rev. D. 127 (2): 432–439. Bibcode:1962PhRv..127..432S. doi:10.1103/PhysRev.127.432.
- G.C. Shukla. Author links open the author workspace.K.P. Sinha (1966). "Electron-phonon coupling in dielectrics". Journal of Physics and Chemistry of Solids. 27 (11–12): 1837–1847. Bibcode:1966JPCS...27.1837S. doi:10.1016/0022-3697(66)90115-6.
- N. Kumar, K. P. Sinha (1968). "Possibility of Photoinduced Superconductivity". Physical Review. 174 (482): 482–488. Bibcode:1968PhRv..174..482K. doi:10.1103/PhysRev.174.482.
- C. Sivaram, K. P. Sinha (1977). "Strong gravity, black holes, and hadrons". Phys. Rev. D. 16 (6): 1975–1978. Bibcode:1977PhRvD..16.1975S. doi:10.1103/PhysRevD.16.1975.
- K.N. Shrivastava, K.P. Sinha (1984). "Magnetic superconductors: Model theories and experimental properties of rare-earth compounds". Physics Reports. 115 (3): 93–149. Bibcode:1984PhR...115...93S. doi:10.1016/0370-1573(84)90122-4.

== See also ==
- Quantum well
- Spontaneous symmetry breaking
