= Kenneth Le Couteur =

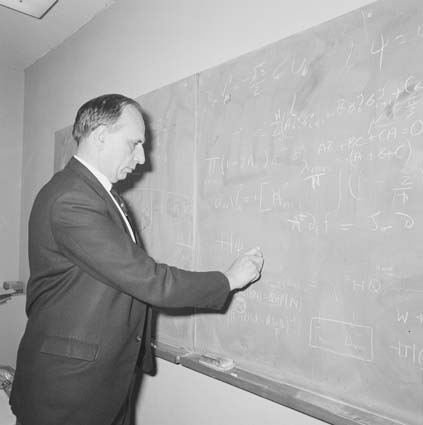
- Born: 16 September 1920; Saint Helier, Jersey
- Died: 18 April 2011 (aged 90); Canberra, Australian Capital Territory
- Education: University of Cambridge; University of Manchester
- Awards: Centenary Medal
- Scientific career
- Fields: physics
- Workplaces: University of Liverpool; Australian National University
- Thesis: Meson Theory (1949)
- Doctoral advisor: Maurice Pryce; Nicholas Kemmer; Léon Rosenfeld

Kenneth James Le Couteur (16 September 1920 – 18 April 2011) was a British physicist who was the foundation Professor of Theoretical Physics at the Australian National University in Canberra. During World War II he worked at Bletchley Park as a codebreaker.

== Early life ==
Kenneth James Le Couteur was born in Saint Helier on the island of Jersey, the son of Philippe Le Couteur, the owner of a carpentry business, and his wife Eva née Gartrell. He was educated at Victoria College Preparatory School and Victoria College on Jersey, where he was inspired to become a mathematician by his maths teacher, who had been a wrangler at the University of Cambridge in England. He received a scholarship to study at St John's College, Cambridge, which he entered in 1938. There he studied mathematics, tutored by Ebenezer Cunningham, who had been the senior wrangler in 1902, and rowed for the college.

The German occupation of the Channel Islands in 1940 left him stranded in England, cut off from his family. He was awarded his Bachelor of Arts degree in 1941, winning the Mayhew Prize for the student showing the greatest distinction in applied mathematics. He was recruited by the Government Code and Cypher School at Bletchley Park as a cryptanalyst. Le Couteur worked on the Enigma machines, and then the Lorenz cipher, codenamed Tunny by the British. The codebreaking process was partly automated, using Robinson machines and the Colossus computers.

After the war ended in 1945, Le Couteur returned to Cambridge as a Fellow of St John's College, where he worked on his doctorate. His academic supervisor initially was Maurice Pryce, but he became the Wykeham Professor of Physics at Oxford University in 1946, and Nicholas Kemmer took over. Le Couteur was awarded a Turner and Newall Fellowship to study at the University of Manchester, where he completed his doctorate in 1948–49 under the supervision of Léon Rosenfeld. His thesis, on Meson Theory, was submitted in 1949, and he was awarded his PhD from Cambridge. At Manchester, he began investigation of the evaporation theory of nuclear disintegration. He also met Enid Margaret Domville, who worked there as a librarian. They were married on 14 July 1950. They had three children, all daughters: Caroline, Penelope and Mary (Avinashi), and a foster daughter, Marion Chesher.

== Academic career ==
Le Couteur became a lecturer in physics at the University of Liverpool in 1949. There he continued developing relativistic wave equations and working on his evaporation theory. He also provided theoretical physicist support of the work of the experimentalists working on the university's 37-inch cyclotron, and collaborated with Ernest Titterton from the Atomic Energy Research Establishment (AERE) in Harwell, Oxfordshire. His work on the Peeler-Regenerative Beam Extraction Method brought him renown, and his solution was employed in the design of subsequent cyclotrons. He also became known for his work on the statistical model of excited nuclei, which he would continue to pursue in Australia.

In 1956, Mark Oliphant recruited Le Couteur as the foundation Professor of Theoretical Physics at the Australian National University in Canberra. When Le Couteur arrived, the faculty of the department consisted of himself and Frederick Barker. He enjoyed the new location, sailing and rock fishing on the nearby South Coast of New South Wales, and sailing on Lake Burley Griffin after the lake was filled in 1964. Le Couteur took up the position in April 1956, and remained there for the rest of his career, except for study leave at CERN and the AERE in 1959 and 1960. In 1960 he was elected as a Fellow of the Australian Academy of Science. He was the acting Director of the Research School of Physical Sciences on many occasions, occupying the position for extended periods from September 1973 until September 1974, and from February to December 1978.

In 1962 Le Couteur arranged for the department to acquire an IBM 1620 as its first computer; it was programmed for numerical calculations in the FORTRAN language. He was also involved in the design and planning of a new Mathematical Sciences building, completed in 1963 and in 1996 renamed the Le Couteur Building. He was recognised with the award of the Centenary Medal in 2001 "for service to Australian society and science in theoretical physics". When he retired in December 1985, he became a professor emeritus, which he remained until 1989.

In 1988, he moved to the Ginninderra Gardens Aged Care Facility in the Canberra suburb of Page. He died on 18 April 2011. He was survived by his wife and daughters.
