= Marshall Stoneham =

British physicist

Professor Arthur Marshall Stoneham FRS
- Born: 18 May 1940; Barrow-in-Furness
- Died: 18 February 2011 (aged 70); Oxford
- Citizenship: British
- Known for: Theory of Defects in Solids (1975)
- Spouse: Doreen Montgomery
- Children: Elise and Nicky
- Scientific career
- Fields: Physics
- Workplaces: University College London; United Kingdom Atomic Energy Authority
- Thesis: (1964)
- Doctoral advisor: Maurice Pryce

Arthur Marshall Stoneham, FRS (18 May 1940 – 18 February 2011), known as Marshall Stoneham, was a British physicist who worked for the United Kingdom Atomic Energy Authority, and from 1995 was Massey professor of physics at University College London.

== Biography ==
Stoneham was born in Barrow-in-Furness on 18 May 1940, son of Garth Rivers Stoneham, consultant obstetrician and gynaecologist, and fellow New Zealander Nancy Wooler (née Leslie). He was educated at Barrow Grammar School for Boys. He then read physics at the University of Bristol, where he graduated with a BSc in 1961, and a PhD, supervised by Maurice Pryce, in 1964.

In 1964, he joined Atomic Energy Research Establishment Harwell, where he spent more than 30 years. After successive promotions, he was made chief scientist of AEA Technology, an offshoot of AERE. But as the ability to conduct basic research diminished at Harwell in the 1990s Stoneham was drawn to UCL, where he was appointed Professor of Physics and Director of the Centre for Materials Research in 1995. He also joined a group, headed by John Finney, working on condensed matter and material physics, which led to the formation of the London Centre for Nanotechnology.

== Personal life ==
Arthur Marshall Stoneham married Doreen Montgomery in Barrow-in-Furness in 1962. They had two daughters, Elise and Nicky. He died on 18 February 2011, at Churchill Hospital, Oxford after complications in surgery. A Thanks giving service to celebrate his life was held at Dorchester Abbey on 15 March, and a concert, ‘in memoriam Marshall Stoneham’, was performed by the Dorchester Wind Players (DWP) on 8 April 2012 at St Nicolas Church, Abingdon.

Stoneham was an amateur horn player and musicologist who played with the DWP for over 40 years. His performances included the solo part of the Strauss Horn Concerto. Colleagues noted his commitment to the ensemble and his professional conduct during his tenure.

Doreen, Elise and Nicky are all directors of Oxford Authentication, a company founded by Marshall and Doreen.

== Awards and honours ==
- Fellowship of the Institute of Physics
- Fellowship of the American Physical Society
- Fellowship if the Royal Society (in 1989)
- Gave Royal Society’s Zeneca prize lecture (1995)
- Honorary Fellow of UCL
- Awarded the Guthrie Medal and Prize of the Institute of Physics (2006)
- President of the IOP in 2010

== Books and papers ==
- Theory of defects in solids: electronic structure of defects in insulators and semiconductors. Oxford: Clarendon Press. 1975. ISBN 0198513313.
- Elastic interactions between surface adatoms and between surface clusters. UKAEA, Harwell Theoretical Physics Division. 1977.
- Laser annealing of semiconductors. UKAEA, Harwell Theoretical Physics Division. 1978.
- The motions of iron particles on graphite. UKAEA, Harwell Theoretical Physics Division. 1978.
- Features of silicon oxidation. AEA Technology Industrial Technology. 1991.
- Elastic interactions between surface adatoms and between surface clusters. UKAEA, Harwell Theoretical Physics Division. 1977.

Stoneham's research papers are listed here
