= Thakur Pyarelal Singh =

Indian activist

Thakur Pyarelal Singh (21 December 1891 – 20 October 1954), was an Indian freedom fighter against British rule and the founder of labour movements in Chhattisgarh. He led three workers' movements in Rajnandgaon Riyast in 1919-1920, 1924 and 1937. He was also conferred with the honorary title of "Tyagmurti", which means "epitome of sacrifice".

== Early life ==
Thakur Pyarelal Singh was born on 21 December 1891, in Daihan village of Rajnandgaon Tehsil. He belonged to the Vaghela (Baghel) Rajput caste. His early childhood was spent in Rajnandgaon. His enthusiasm to learn and a keen interest in studies brought him to Raipur to continue his higher education. In 1913, he earned a Bachelor's degree in Arts from Nagpur, winning many accolades and honours. In 1915, he graduated from law school and began to practice law. He also had a keen interest in sports such as gillidanda, chess, hockey, and swimming. His entire family made an immense contribution to India's struggle for freedom. His sons Thakur Ramkrishna Singh, Thakur Sachidanand Singh, Hari Thakur, and Ramnarayan Singh Thakur were prominent figures in the spheres of the Indian freedom movement, contemporary politics, social welfare, literature, and journalism in Chhattisgarh. His efforts and sacrifices were recognized and appreciated when he was awarded the honorary title of "Tyagmurthi", which means "epitome of sacrifice".

== Role in freedom struggle ==
In 1916, he met the cotton mill workers based in Rajnandgaon. He learned that the workers were mistreated by the British officers and that they had to work 12 hours each day. Their plight made Thakur Pyarelal start an organization to help the workers. In 1909 he began Saraswati Pustkalaya in Rajnandgaon. In 1920, Rajnandgaon Mill Workers, led by Thakur Pyarelal Singh started a strike that lasted more than 37 days. This was India's first long-term strike and it managed to reduced the worker's working hours. With the creation of the non-cooperation movement by Mahatma Gandhi, he left his legal practice and began to campaign for Indian independence from Britain. Many students left Raj-sponsored public schools during the non-cooperation movement, and many lawyers abandoned their practices. Many Indian national schools were established during this period under Thakur Pyarelal's supervision, including the Madhyamik School in Rajnandgaon. His father, Mr. Dindayal Singh was Deputy Inspector of Schools for Rajnandgaon, Kawardha, and Chuikhadan.

In 1923, the Flag Satyagrah Movement was announced by Congress, and Thakur Pyarelal led this movement in various regions of Chhattisgarh (formerly known as Madhya Pradesh). Innumerable satyagrahis from all over the state joined him in generating public awareness. In 1924, a second mill workers' strike in Rajnandgaon led by Thakur Pyarelal Singh saw violent demonstrations against the British Government resulting in further concessions to the workers. In 1924, Thakur Pyarelal Singh resumed his legal career in Raipur.

In 1930, Congress assigned the responsibility of the boycott movement to Thakur Pyarelal Singh including the picketing of liquor stores. As a result he was sentenced one year's imprisonment by the British Government. Upon his release he continued his campaigning and in 1932 was again imprisoned for two years, losing his privileges to practice law. Released from prison in 1934, he was elected minister of Mahakoshal Provincial Congress Committee. In 1936 he was elected to the assembly for the first time. Mahatma Gandhi invited him for a discussion on new teaching methods. In 1937, Thakur Pyarelal establishing the first college in the State called as Chhattisgarh college. Thakur Pyarelal Singh was elected as president of Raipur municipal corporation in 1937, 1940 and 1944. Under his presidency, the state saw an array of advancements including the construction of many new primary schools, hospitals and roads. In 1944 Thakur Pyarelal encouraged in the establishment of Farmers Rice Cooperative Factory in Mahasamund. He also promoted organisations such as the Dhani Union, Vishwakarma Association and the Coppersmith Association. In 1945 Pyarelal established the Chhattisgarh Weavers Cooperative societies in all districts of the state to raise living standards for workers. In 1946, Thakur Pyarelal Ji established Congressional parties in all the villages of Chhattishgarh.

In 1950, Thakur Pyarelal travelled to the north-eastern parts of India with an aim to encourage education among the population, launching the publication Rashtra Bandhu with the same purpose. In 1951, Thakur Pyarelal resigned from Congress and became a member of the All India Kisan Mazdoor Party, a Gandhian organization, led by chairman Acharya Kripalani.

In 1952, Pyarelal Ji was elected as Member of Legislative Assembly from Raipur. Immediately after the election, he joined the Bhoodan Movement of Acharya Vinoba Bhave. He travelled extensively on foot across the region over the next two years visiting villages to promote the Bhoodan Movement. He started 1954 with the aim to walk 2,200 miles and visit over three hundred villages in three months to spread the message of the Bhoodan Movement. Despite feeling unwell on 20 October he continued to deliver a speech before suffering a fatal heart attack later that day. On 22 October 1954, he was cremated on the banks of the River Kharun.
