= Music of Chhattisgarh =

Chhattisgarh is a state of India with strong tribal traditions of music and dance. The state of Chhattisgarh is best known for its deep roots in folk music, which originated from its long history of tribal involvement.

== History ==
Situated geographically in the centre of India, Chhattisgarh has a rich, historical culture of Indian folk music. This music is closely linked to the heritage of the town and has a strong interaction with relevant dances. The history of music in Chhattisgarh links to the states tribal population which covers about one-third of the community. These tribal communities include Kamar, Kanver, Gond, Birhi, Baiga, Pando, Uranv, Korva, Halba and Binjhwar. Each of which makes up a large part of Chhattisgarh's history and population.

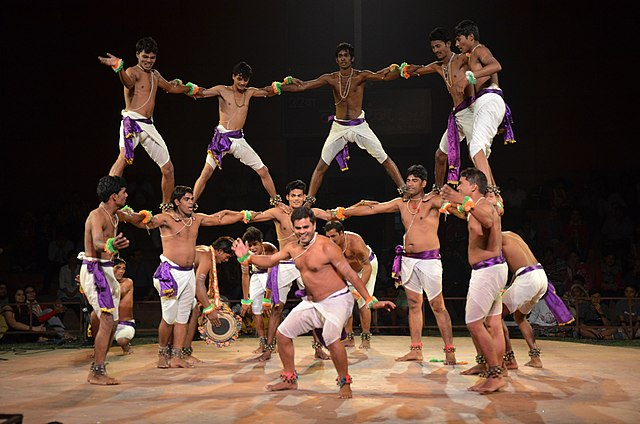
Tribal men group from the Chhattisgarh state of India performs a dance in which they sing and dance with different formations. They try to create a closed dome formation and dance simultaneously, this dance is one of the award-winning and high octane level performance on the stage.

The music of Chhattisgarh is closely linked to the role of dance throughout its history. This is due to the religious and ceremonial aspect that music, particularly that of folk, has held the heritage of Chhattisgarh. Folk dance in Chhattisgarh is performed as a form of worship to Gods and mark the changing of seasons. This tradition dates back in history. The state of Chhattisgarh is one of the earliest dating’s of tribal communities in India, with the line dating back to 10 000 years ago in Baster. With each of these communities being home to their own distinct cultures, ceremonies, traditions and customs, there are various versions of music throughout Chhattisgarh.

Due to the music of Chhattisgarh deriving from such a long line of history, original composers and lyricists are often exceptionally difficult to source. Rather, the practice of singing and oral storytelling through time has been what has allowed for the long time span of these lyrics.

== Musical Forms ==
Up until 2021, Chhattisgarh has been recognised for its traditional music rather than the adoption of contemporary songs. This traditional music follows a primarily folk sound, often being sung to the tunes of indigenous instrumental accompaniments. The music itself is often backdropped to the sounds of measured, dancing steps which add to the overall symphony of Chhattisgarh song.

Singing is another element often found in Chhattisgarh music, with songs being the primary ways that stories are told. There are various, famous methods of singing in Chhattisgarh.

- Pandavani: originated in the Mahabharata region. The most common form of music in Chhattisgarh. Sung by both male and female storytellers. Tells the stories of the Pandavas in the epic: ‘Mahabharata’, using both song and dance. The folk ballad form is narrated in a lively form, focusing on visual description. Traditionally it is narrated by a lead male as well as supporting musicians and singers. The characters of the Mahabharata are enacted by these performers. The form allows for the episode by episode telling of the epic. The influence of Chhattisgarh traditional folk music on popular culture may also be seen in Habib Tanvir's plays. Tanvir used folk singers of Chhattisgarh to craft a free-style story narration format that carried typical aspects of Panfavani performance.
- Chandeni: originated in the Bhiwani District, Haryana state
- Bharthari: originated from the folk tales of the Holy Raja Bharthari

== Musical Instruments ==
Different types of instruments are required for itinerant singers and choirs within Chhattisgarh folk dance Nomadic singers often use light and small instruments that are easily moved by foot, whilst congregations need whole orchestral groupings of instruments. Ethnic instruments such as Daphra: a percussion drum made of a hollow wooden tube, Gudum: a membranophone percussion instrument, Mohri: a bowed string instrument, Jhaanjh: a form of cymbal and a Manjeera: a pair of small, handheld, high-pitched cymbals.

Prior to 1980, Ghumantu singers would sing alone or with a ragi-like partner. These songs would be sung with handmade instruments including the: tambara, kingra baja, sarangi or sarangi, bana, khanjari or dhaf, dhafli. However, following 1980, a new phase of the singing of folk stories like Pandwani, Bharthari, Chandaloric began forming new troupes of instrumental collections. In these circles, musical instruments such as benzo, harmonium, tabla, flute and dholak increased. Traditional instruments like dhapra, nishan, nagara, tudburi, mohri-shehnai, mandar are in circulation all over Chhattisgarh. Areas like Bastar, Surguja and Raigarh are also popular in plain or plain Chhattisgarh.

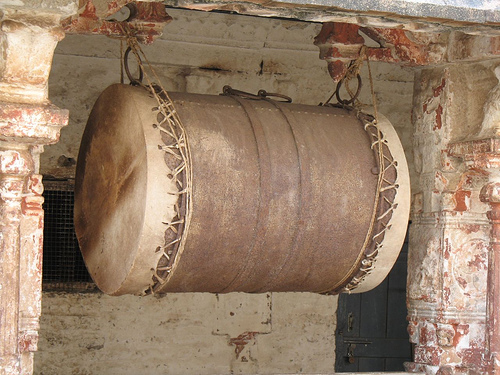
A traditional Indian dholak drum

These include: The following musical instruments are more popular in plain Chhattisgarh:

- Bamboo: Bamboo is the melodious instrument played in the bamboo song sung by the Ahirs. It is a form of flute in which there is no thread to produce sound, the bamboo is blown in such a way that only sound can be produced from it. Bamboo is the accompaniment played in the bamboo song sung by the Ahirs. This is another form of flute in which there is no thread to produce sound, rather, the bamboo is blown in such a way that only a single sound can be produced from it. Its length is kept so that it is made up of three bundles of bamboo. The instrument is polished evenly via a blood-filled iron ball being placed into the bamboo, proceeding to burn it from the inside. Repeating this action, the bamboo becomes uniformly polished from the inside. The bamboo instrument consists of five holes to create its various tones.
- Dholak: a major rhythm instrument. It is used throughout North and Central India. This cylindrical instrument is played by all men and women. It is played by hanging it around the neck or keeping it on the ground. The dholak is mostly played by hand. It is made from mango, bija, sheesham, teak or neem wood. The instrument includes a layer of goat's skin which is tightened by a series of cords on either face. Tonal variety is achieved from a series of rings in the strings and can be adjusted by tightening these cords with a rope of leather or cotton.

== Lore and Cultural Significance ==
As reflected in its primary ceremonial use, music in India has a deep cultural significance that derives from its connection to, and establishment from, nature. A major philosophy in Chhattisgarh is the valuing of nature as a vital aspect of all human society, fundamental to the survival and nourishing of all communities. Nature fits into the lore of Chhattisgarh through the common belief that this dependence humanity has on nature is a signatory of our inseparable connection to its inspiration. Further, the notion of uniformity and connection is strengthened by symbolising nature as a connection between all tribes, societies and races across our world. This lore is known as folk culture in Chhattisgarh.

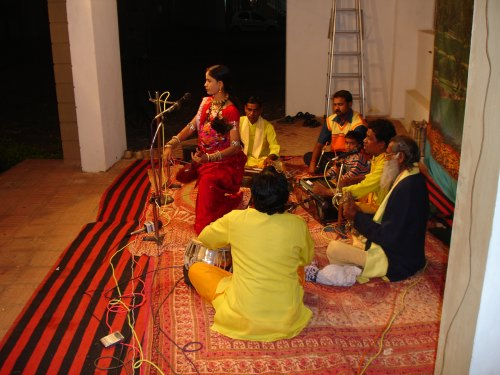
World Famous Pandwani Artist Ritu Verma performing at Nimora village near Raipur, Chhattisgarh

Due to this deep connection to nature, folk songs of Chhattisgarh look to emit feels and emotions within individuals. The emotion of focus within these songs is that of freedom from any constraints or difficulties being faced by individuals. Hence, music is a significant part of the cultural heritage of Chhattisgarh, with it being seen as a means to which this freedom may be achieved.

Further, the cultural significance of music within Chhattisgarh is shown through various famous lyrics still being available to us as a result of the oral storytelling and passing on of these stories through time.

These lyrics are used either in lore (the retelling of an epic story such as the Mahabharata) or ceremonial (to perform at an event of some importance, i.e. Marriage and the change of seasons), as well as to depict a great emotion (demise, freedom, hope).

Many of the folk songs rely on the seasons and the weather to dictate when they are sung/performed. Examples of this may be seen through how Sawnahi is sung during the rainy and wet seasons, whilst Baramasi is sung over 12 months, and Fag as a part of the Basant Geet.

== Common types of Folk songs ==
Sohar Geet:

“Sate sakhi aagu chale, sate sakhi chale, sate

sakhi ho lalana

Beech me dashada maharani chale ho Yamuna paani ho”

The Sohar Geet is performed on the eve of a child’s birth to bless the child and the expecting mother with long and healthy lives. The songs depict the pain of the process of childbirth as well as the beauty of the connection between mother and child. The song is traditionally performed as a re-enactment of the conversation between Nanad and their sister in law at the birth of Krishna, and Lord Rama. The song also holds significant cultural significance in the promise of a continuation of one's family line through time and the good feeling that arises from this. In Bhojpuri dialect, the word Sohar means to feel good. Though the use of the song and general aspects of its performance stays the same throughout India, different regions and dialects call it different names. Many common alternatives include Sohla, Sohal, Sohilo and Somar. The most popular of the Sohar songs include titles such as Mili Juli Gaave, Nand Ke Janme, Bahuji Ke Petwa Mein Peera, Ganga Maiya Ki Oonchi and Janme Gokul Mein etc.

Vivah Geet:

“Ek tel Chadhge Ho hariyar hariyar

Mandva ma dhularu to badan kumhalay

Ram Lakhan ke ho Ram Lakhan ke

Tel o chadhat hai Kanhaba ke diyana hove anjor”

The Vivah Geet is performed as a part of the ritual of marriage. Vivah itself translates to ‘marriage’. Traditional Chhattisgarhi marriage ceremonies contain various activities as part of the ritual such as Mangni: when soil is collected from the local water source to craft a clay oven. At such segments of the marriage, the Vivah Geet is performed.

Mrityu Geet

“Humko uda do chadariya kale ke bera hai

Sangi saathi jarkar aaye aaye

Angna me khade bartiya

Charjane mil bohkar le gaye”

The Mrityu Geet is meant to depict and/or emit the notion of loss. It is known as the song of demise. The song traditionally depicts the idea of the immortal being unleashed.

Bihav song

The Bihav song is a category that is used and sung during marriage celebrations to commemorate the union. As many marriages in Chhattisgarh last over several days, much like many other Indian states, Bihav songs are sung according to various days of the marriage ritual. They are divided into various theses, mostly relating to the act of marriage.

These themes include:

- Maymour
- Chulmati
- Telmati
- Parghani
- Bhadoni
- Nahdouri

The cultural significance of music within the Bihav song is hence deeply linked to rituals and customs of society. Many of these songs have been used to add a sense of tradition to the marriage ritual as well as add to the enthusiasm and excitement of the ceremony.

Sua Songs

Sua songs are a popular type of folk song common in the Dantewada and Bilaspur districts of Chhattisgarh. The songs are intended to be accompanied by Sua dance performances. Sua songs or Sua Geet songs refer to folk music that is performed by the women of Chhattisgarh as a celebration of the harvest period. They are an integral aspect of the festivals and celebrations in many rural areas of the state of Chhattisgarh. Sua songs hold a particular performative element to them, with song, dance and colour each interacting to contribute to their attraction. Because of such, they are also commonly used in the celebration of Diwali within Chhattisgarh. In Chhattisgarh folk music, the Sua song is noted as feminine, and so it is traditionally performed by women who use the symbol of the parrot, Sua, to tell the story of internal worlds. The song is deeply connected to the history of Gond Adivasis tradition as a representation of the regional performative form. Post the celebration of Diwali, women from Chhattisgarh begin performing and singing these songs, continuing for up to two months. The songs are performed in a circle within the centre of which, a basket filled with harvested grain and traditionally a wooden parrot figurine is displayed. Rather than being accompanied by musical instruments, the songs are set to the beat of the collective clapping of hands. Because of this, Sua songs are very rhymic and lively. Often, Sua songs are also used as a form of celebration for the wedding of Shiva Parvati in Chhattisgarh lore.
