= Ram Prakash Singh =

Indian scientist and educator

Ram Prakash Singh (known as Prof. R. P. Singh) is an Indian scientist, educator and researcher. He works as emeritus scientist at IISER Pune. He is known for his works as vice-chancellor Lucknow University (years 2005 to 2008) and as professor and head, Materials Science Centre, IIT Kharagpur. He was an alumnus of Glasgow University, Liverpool University and Allahabad University.

== Career ==
Singh was working on polymer science and engineering - a part of materials science. He has research and teaching experience in India, United States, Iraq, France, Germany, Italy, and Russia.

He had 11 patents in his name. His research papers were published in International Journals. He published more than 200 peer-reviewed papers.

He had more than 51 years of research experience in the field of polymers and materials science. His current research is focused on polymer solar cells.

== Recognition ==
- 2005 Flory Award
