= Rajendra Badgaiyan =

American physician

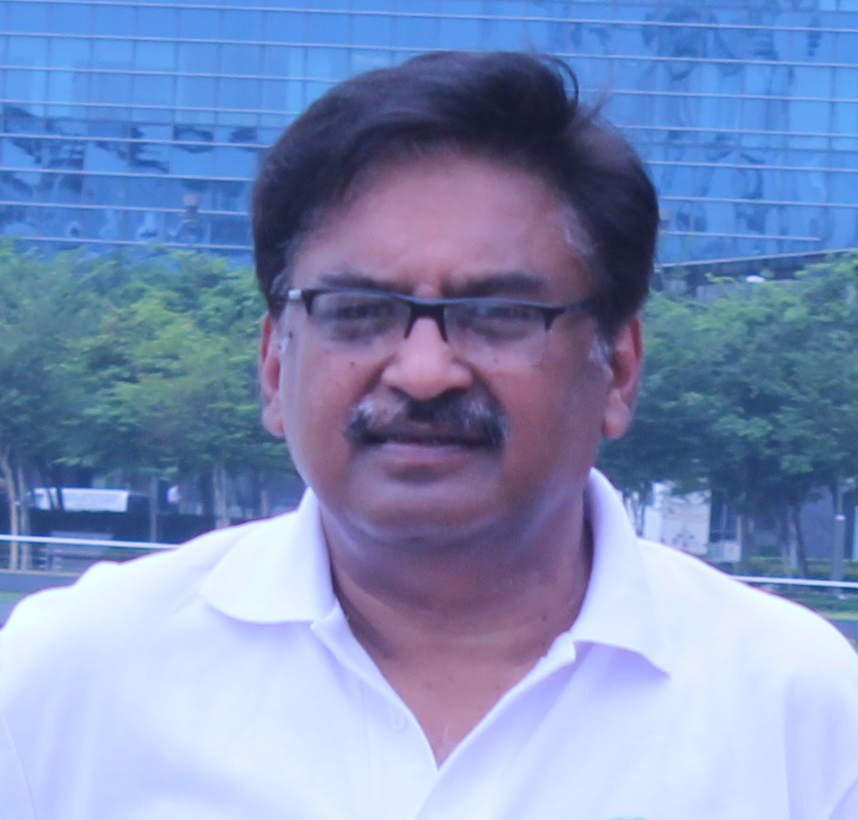
- Born: July 14, 1955; Sarangarh, Chhattisgarh, India
- Citizenship: United States
- Education: Gandhi Medical College; Harvard Medical School
- Known for: Developing Single scan dynamic molecular imaging technique
- Scientific career
- Fields: Psychiatry, Cognitive Neuroscience
- Workplaces: University of Texas Health Science Center at San Antonio; South Texas Veterans Healthcare System, San Antonio; University of Minnesota; Harvard Medical School

Professor Rajendra D Badgaiyan (born 1955) is an Indian-American psychiatrist and cognitive neuroscientist. He is best known for developing a new neuroimaging technique for detection of acute changes in concentration of dopamine released in the live human brain during performance of a cognitive, behavioral, or emotional task.

The technique is called single scan dynamic molecular imaging technique and it uses positron emission tomography (PET) for detection, mapping and measurement of dopamine released during brain processing. This technique has for the first time allowed scientists to detect changes in the concentration of neurotransmitters released acutely during task performance. It expanded the scope of neuroimaging studies by allowing detection of neurochemical changes associated with the brain processing.

Badgaiyan is also known for his theory of supervisory attentional system.

== Life ==
Badgaiyan was born and raised in India. He graduated with MBBS and MD degrees from Gandhi Medical College Bhopal and received an MA degree in psychology from Bhopal University. He taught neurophysiology in medical schools in Bhopal, Rohtak and Banaras Hindu University. In India, he was awarded a number of prizes and awards including the prestigious BK Anand Prize of the Association of Physiologists and Pharmacologists of India in 1991. He developed Neurophysiology Laboratory at Gandhi Medical College and Behavior Research Laboratory at Banaras Hindu University according to his CV.

In 1995 he moved to the US to work with Prof Michael Posner at University of Oregon. He was trained in brain imaging and cognitive neuroscience at Oregon, Western Psychiatric Institute and Clinic at University of Pittsburgh Massachusetts General Hospital, Harvard University, Harvard Medical School and Massachusetts Institute of Technology. At Harvard, he worked in the laboratory of Daniel Schacter. and finished psychiatry residency training program at Harvard Medical School. During the training, he received the Solomon Award for the best young researcher and the Dupont and Livingston prizes. In 2004 he received prize for outstanding research conducted at Massachusetts General Hospital and was recognized as one of the promising young investigators by the Society of Nuclear Medicine. In 2009 he moved to University at Buffalo to establish Molecular Imaging Laboratory. He also served as the Director of Outpatient chemical dependency clinic at Buffalo. In 2014 he moved to University of Minnesota at Minneapolis to accept a position of tenured professor of psychiatry. He was also appointed Neuromodulation Scholar of the University and the Director of the Laboratory of Advanced Radiochemistry and of Molecular and Functional Imaging.

His book titled Neuroscience of the Nonconscious Mind published by Elsevier and Academic press in 2019 is one of the few books on the topic.

Currently he is the Chief of Psychiatry at South Texas Veterans Health Care System, San Antonio TX and a professor of Psychiatry and Behavioral Sciences at Long School of Medicine, University of Texas Health, San Antonio, Texas.
