= Pandavani =

Indian folk singing style

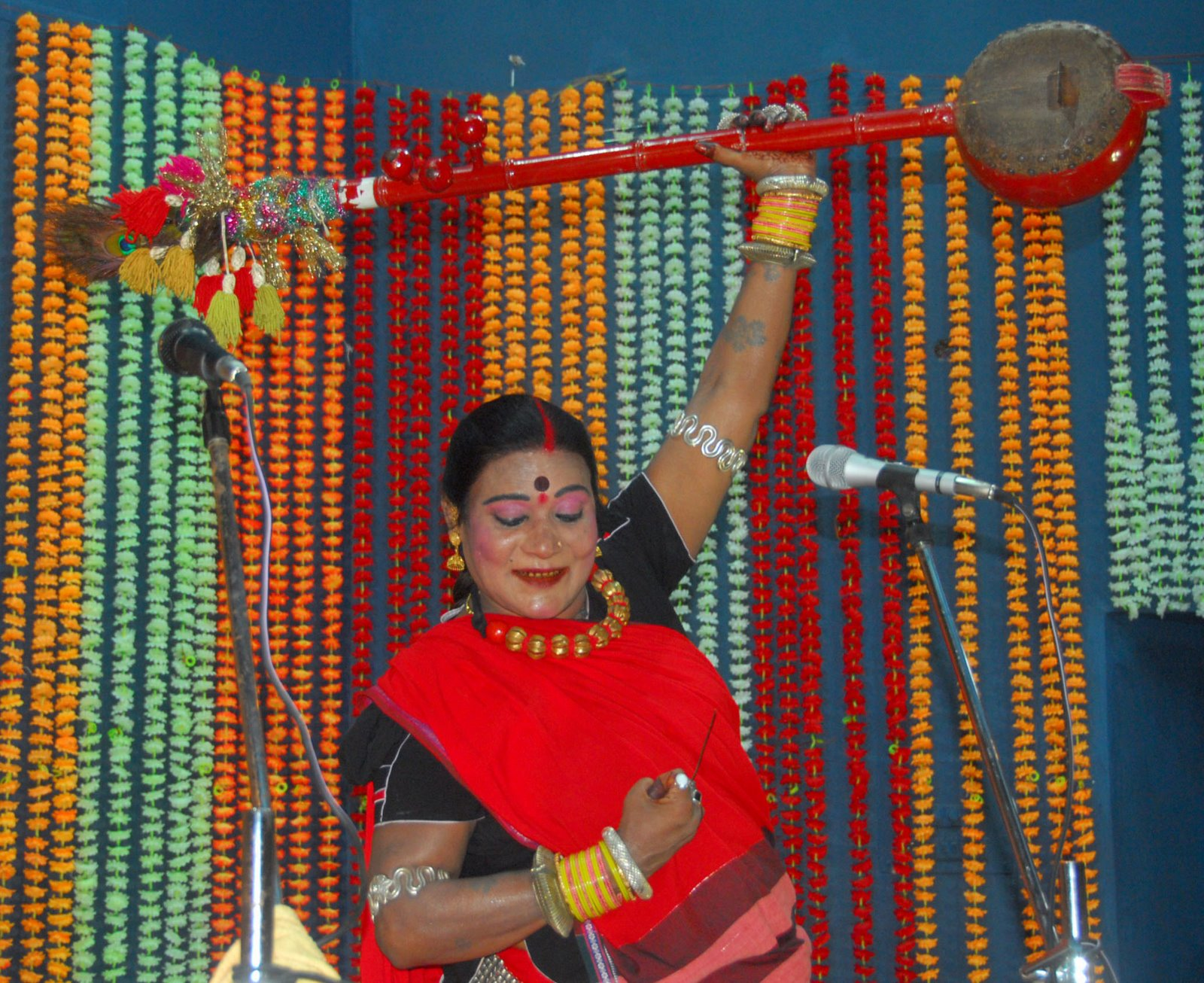
Teejan Bai, noted exponent of Pandavani

Pandavani (lit.: Songs and Stories of the Pandavas) is a folk singing style involving narration of tales from the ancient Indian epic Mahabharata. The singing also involves musical accompaniment. Bhima, the second of the Pandava is the hero of the story in this style.

This form of folk theatre is popular in the central Indian state of Chhattisgarh and in the neighbouring areas of Madhya Pradesh, Odisha and Andhra Pradesh.

Jhaduram Dewangan and Teejan Bai are the most renowned singers of this style. Among contemporary artists, Ritu Verma is popular along with others such as Shantibai Chelak and Usha Barle.

== Origins ==
The origins of this singing style are not known and according to its foremost singer Teejan Bai, it might be as old as the Mahabharata itself, as few people could read in those times and that is how perhaps they passed on their stories generation after generation. Traditionally, Pandavani was performed exclusively by men. Since the 1980s, however, women also began to present Pandavani.

Pandavani can be understood as a part of the tradition of the tellers-of-tales present in every culture or tradition (like Baul singers of Bengal and Kathak performers), where ancient epics, anecdotes and stories are recounted or re-enacted to educate and entertain the masses.

== About the style ==
Pandavani, literally means stories or songs of the Pandavas, the legendary brothers of Mahabharat, and involves the lead singer, enacting and singing an episode (called '|prasang) from the epic with an ektara or a tambura (stringed musical instrument), decorated with small bells and peacock feathers in one hand and sometimes kartal (a pair of cymbals) on another.

During a performance, as the story builds, the tambura becomes a prop, sometimes to personify Bhima's 'gadaa' mace, or Arjun's bow or chariot, or the hair of queen Draupadi or Dushasan thus helping the narrator-singer play all the characters of story. The form does not employ any stage props or settings. With the use of mimicry and rousing theatrical movements, once in a while the singer-narrator breaks into an impromptu dance at the completion of an episode or to celebrate a victory in the story being retold. The singer is usually supported by a group of performers on Harmonium, Tabla, Dholak, Manjira and two or three singers who sing the refrain and provide backing vocals.

Each singer adds his or her unique style to the singing, sometimes adding local words, improvising and offering critique on current happenings and insights through the story. Gradually, as the story progresses, the performance becomes more intense and experiential with added dance movements. An element of surprise is often used. The lead singer continuously interacts with the accompanying singers, who ask questions, give commentary and interjections; thus enhancing the dramatic effect of the performance. The performance can last for several hours on a single episode of Mahabharata. What starts out as a simple story narration turns into full-fledged ballad.

== Variations (Shaili) ==
- Vedamati – the style of narration is said to be based on Sabbal Singh Chauhan's Mahabharat written in the Doha-Chaupal Metre. The term Veda is loosely used to refer to text. This style was made popular by Jhaduram Devangan. Other exponents of this style are Poonaram Nishad, Ritu Verma, Rewaram Sahu.
- Kapalik – the style of narration where the performer is free to improvise consistently on episodes and characters in the epic. The term Kapal is of significance here as it refers to memory or experience which inform the content of the performance. Teejan Bai is an exponent of this genre of pandwani. Usha Barle, Shanti Bai are also the performers of this style.

== Impact on popular culture ==
Influences of Pandavani can be clearly seen in the plays of Habib Tanvir, who used folk singers of Chhattisgarh in his plays, creating a free-style story narration format, typical of Pandavani.

== Exponents of Pandavani ==
- Jhaduram Devangan
- Punaram Nishad
- Teejan Bai
- Ritu Verma (Pandavani singer)
- Chetan Dewangan
- Shantibai Chelak
- Usha Barle

== See also ==
- Music of Chhattisgarh
