= Lingaya's Lalita Devi Institute of Management & Sciences =

- Type: Private
- Established: 2005
- Affiliations: Guru Gobind Singh Indraprastha University, NAAC A+
- Chairman: Dr. Picheshwar Gadde
- Director: Prof. (Dr.) Pranav Mishra
- Students: 1156
- Undergraduates: 1156
- Location: New Delhi, Delhi, India
- Campus: Mandi Road
- Website: lldims.edu.in

Lingaya's Lalita Devi Institute of Management & Sciences (LLDIMS) is a NAAC A+ college affiliated with Guru Gobind Singh Indraprastha University and located in Mandi, Delhi. Admission to LLDIMS is through the Common Entrance Test (CET) conducted by Guru Gobind Singh Indraprastha University and CUET conducted by NTA. LLDIMS is recognised under section 2(f) by UGC.

== Background ==
LLDIMS was established in 2005 by Gadde Charitable Trust.

== Recognition and accreditation ==
Lingaya's Lalita Devi Institute of Management & Sciences has been accredited by the National Assessment and Accreditation Council (NAAC) with an "A+" grade. The institute offers B.Com. (Hons), B.Ed., BBA, BCA and BAJMC undergraduate full-time degree programmes.
