= Teejan Bai =

Indian singer (1956–2026)

Padma Vibhushan Teejan Bai
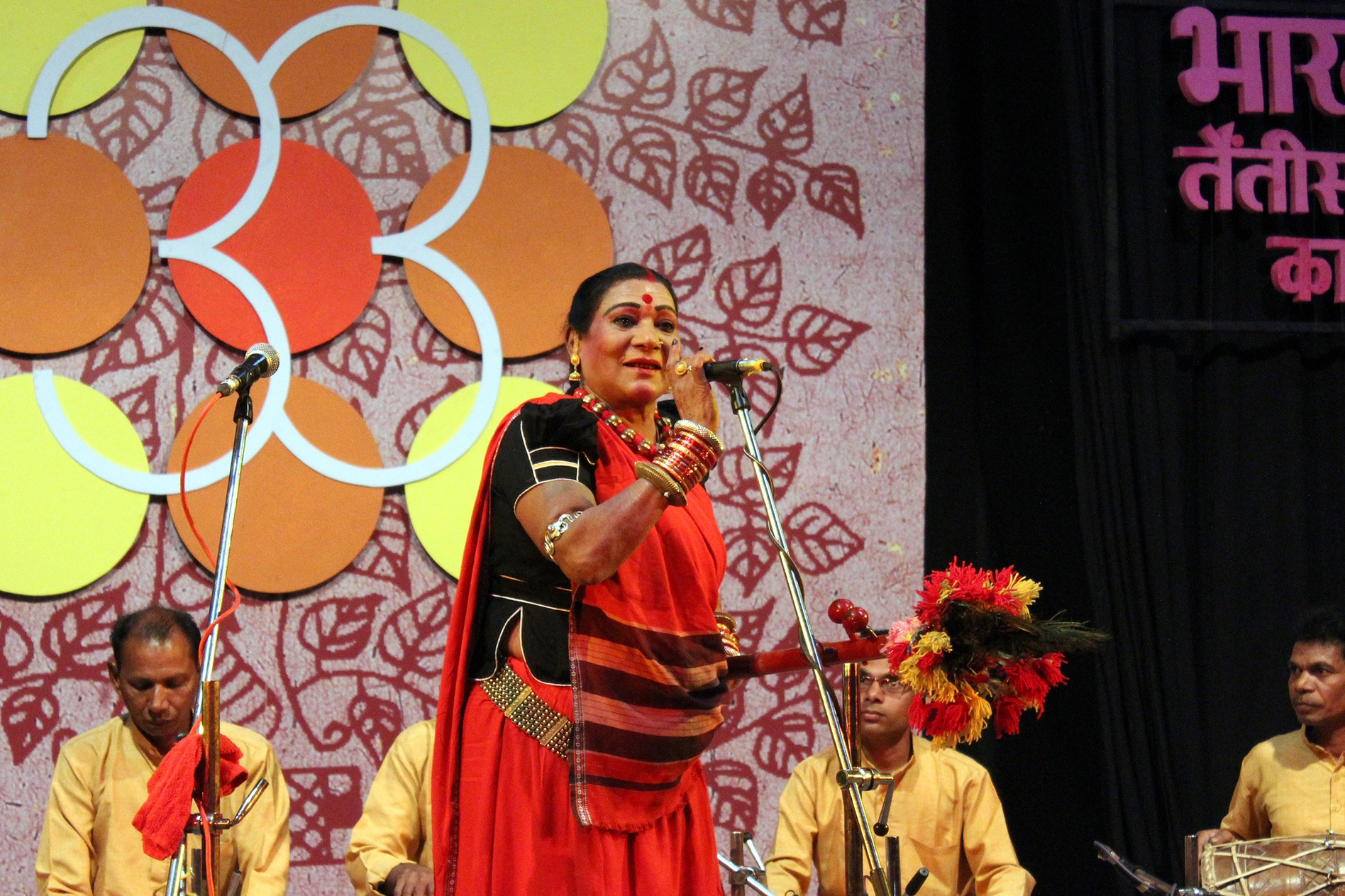
- Born: 24 April 1956; Ganiyari village, Durg district, Madhya Pradesh, India
- Died: 5 July 2026 (aged 70); Raipur, Chhattisgarh, India
- Occupation: Pandavani folk singer
- Spouse: Tukka Ram
- Awards: Padma Shri 1988; Sangeet Natak Akademi Award 1995; Padma Bhushan 2003; Fukuoka Prize 2018; Padma Vibhushan 2019; Sangeet Natak Akademi Fellowship

Teejan Bai (Chhattisgarhi: तीजन बाई, 24 April 1956 – 5 July 2026) was an Indian singer and exponent of Pandavani, a traditional performing art form, from Chhattisgarh, in which she enacted tales from the Mahabharata, with musical accompaniment.

Bai was awarded the Padma Shri in 1988, Padma Bhushan in 2003, and Padma Vibhushan in 2019 by Government of India, along with the Sangeet Natak Akademi Award in 1995, given by Sangeet Natak Akademi, India's National Academy of Music, Dance & Drama.

== Life and career ==
=== Early life ===
Teejan Bai was born in Ganiyari village, 14 kilometres (8.7 mi) north of Bhilai, to Chunuk Lal Pardhi and his wife Sukhwati. She belonged to the Pardhi Scheduled Tribe of Chhattisgarh state.

During her childhood, she heard her maternal grandfather, Brijlal Pardhi, recite the Mahabharata written by Chhattisgarhi writer Sabal Singh Chauhan in Chhattisgarhi and instantly took a liking to it. At age 12, she was married off, although she escaped at age 13.

=== Career ===
At age 13, Bai gave her first public performance in the neighbouring village of Chandrakhuri for 10 Rupees, singing in the Kapalik style of 'Pandavani', a first time for a woman, as traditionally women used to sing in the Vedamati, the sitting style. Contrary to the tradition, she performed standing singing out loud in her typical guttural voice and unmistakable verve, entering what was till then, a male bastion. Within a short time, she became known in the neighbouring villages and invitations poured in to perform at special occasions and festivals.

Her big break came when Habib Tanvir, a theatre personality from Madhya Pradesh, noticed her talent, and she was called to perform for then Prime Minister, Indira Gandhi. In time she received national and international recognition, a Padma Shri in 1988, Sangeet Natak Akademi Award in 1995, and Padma Bhushan in 2003.

Beginning in the 1980s, Bai travelled all over the world as a cultural ambassador, to countries as far as England, France, Switzerland, Germany, Turkey, Tunisia, Malta, Cyprus, Romania and Mauritius. She performed sequences from the Mahabharata in Shyam Benegal's acclaimed Doordarshan TV series Bharat Ek Khoj based on Jawaharlal Nehru's book.

Bai continued to perform internationally and was known for her folk singing. She was also involved in passing on the tradition to younger generations. In 2019, she was awarded the Padma Vibhushan, one of India's highest civilian honours.

=== Personal life and death ===
Though Bai was married at the age of 12, she was expelled by the Pardhi tribe for singing Pandavani as a woman. She built herself a small hut and started living on her own, borrowing utensils and food from neighbours, yet she never gave up singing, which eventually paid off. She never went to her first husband's home and later divorced him. In the following years, she was married twice and later became a grandmother.

Bai died on 5 July 2026 in AIIMS Raipur, at the age of 69, after struggling with various health issues for several weeks and undergoing treatment since 27 May of that year.

== Performance style ==
Pandavani, literally means stories of the Pandavas, the legendary brothers in Mahabharata, and involves enacting and singing with instrumental accompaniment, using an ektara or a tambura in one hand and sometimes a kartal in another. As the performance progresses, the tambura becomes her only prop, sometimes to personify a gada, the mace of Bhima, or Arjuna's bow or chariot, while at other times it becomes the hair of queen Draupadi, allowing her to play various characters with effective ease and candour. Her acclaimed performances included Draupadi Cheerharan, Dushasana Vadh and Mahabharat Yudh, between Bhishma and Arjun.

== Awards ==
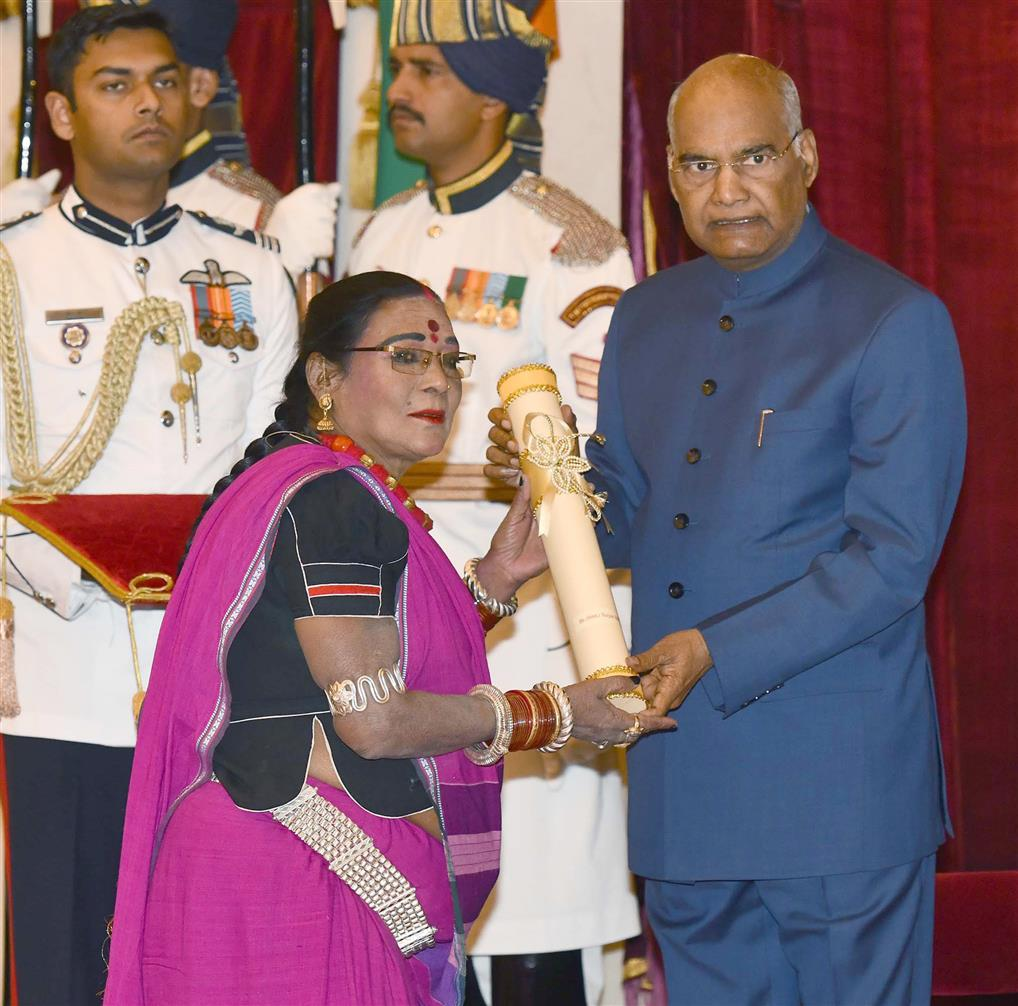
President Shri Ram Nath Kovind presenting the Padma Vibhushan Award to Teejan Bai, at an investiture Ceremony at Rashtrapati Bhavan, in New Delhi in 2019

- 1988: Padma Shri
- 1995: Sangeet Natak Akademi Award
- 2003: Hon. D.Litt., Bilaspur University
- 2003: Padma Bhushan
- 2016: M S Subbalaxmi centenary award
- 2018: Fukuoka prize
- 2019: Padma Vibhushan

== See also ==
- Music of Chhattisgarh
