= Kiran Pisda =

Indian footballer (born 2001)

Personal information
- Full name: Kiran Pisda
- Date of birth: 16 August 2001 (age 25)
- Place of birth: Chhattisgarh, India
- Position: Forward

Team information
- Current team: Kickstart
- Number: 16

Senior career*
Years	Team	Apps	(Gls)
2021–2022	Mata Rukmani Girls	11	(2)
2022	Kerala Blasters		
2022–2023	Sethu	7	(2)
2023–2024	Dinamo Zagreb	5	(1)
2024–2025	Odisha	13	(1)
2025–	Kickstart		

International career^{‡}
2022–	India	11	(0)
- * Club domestic league appearances and goals ‡ National team caps and goals as of 27 October 2025

Kiran Pisda (born 16 August 2001) is an Indian professional footballer who plays as a forward for the Indian Women's League club Kickstart and the India women's national football team. She is the first player from Chhattisgarh to play for the Indian senior national team.

== Club career ==
Pisda was born to a tribal family in Chhattisgarh. She started her football career by playing for Durg. Pisda got her training from girls football academy under the supervision of coaches from sports and youth welfare department of Chhattisgarh. She played for Raipur in different state league tournaments and also played for Chhattisgarh in national leagues. In 2022, she was signed by Kerala Blasters FC as a part of their newly launched women's team.

On 8 November 2023, it was officially announced that she, along with M. K. Kashmina, joined Croatian Women's League club ŽNK Dinamo Zagreb on a one-year deal.

== International career ==
In September 2022, she was included in the final 23 squad of Indian team to play in the 2022 SAFF Women's Championship.

== Career statistics ==
=== International ===
As of 27 October 2025

National team	Year	Caps	Goals
India	2022	4	0
India	2023	0	0
India	2024	0	0
India	2025	7	0
Total		11	0

== Honours ==
Dinamo Zagreb

- Croatian Women's Football Cup: 2023–24
