= Maurice Pryce =

British physicist (1913–2003)

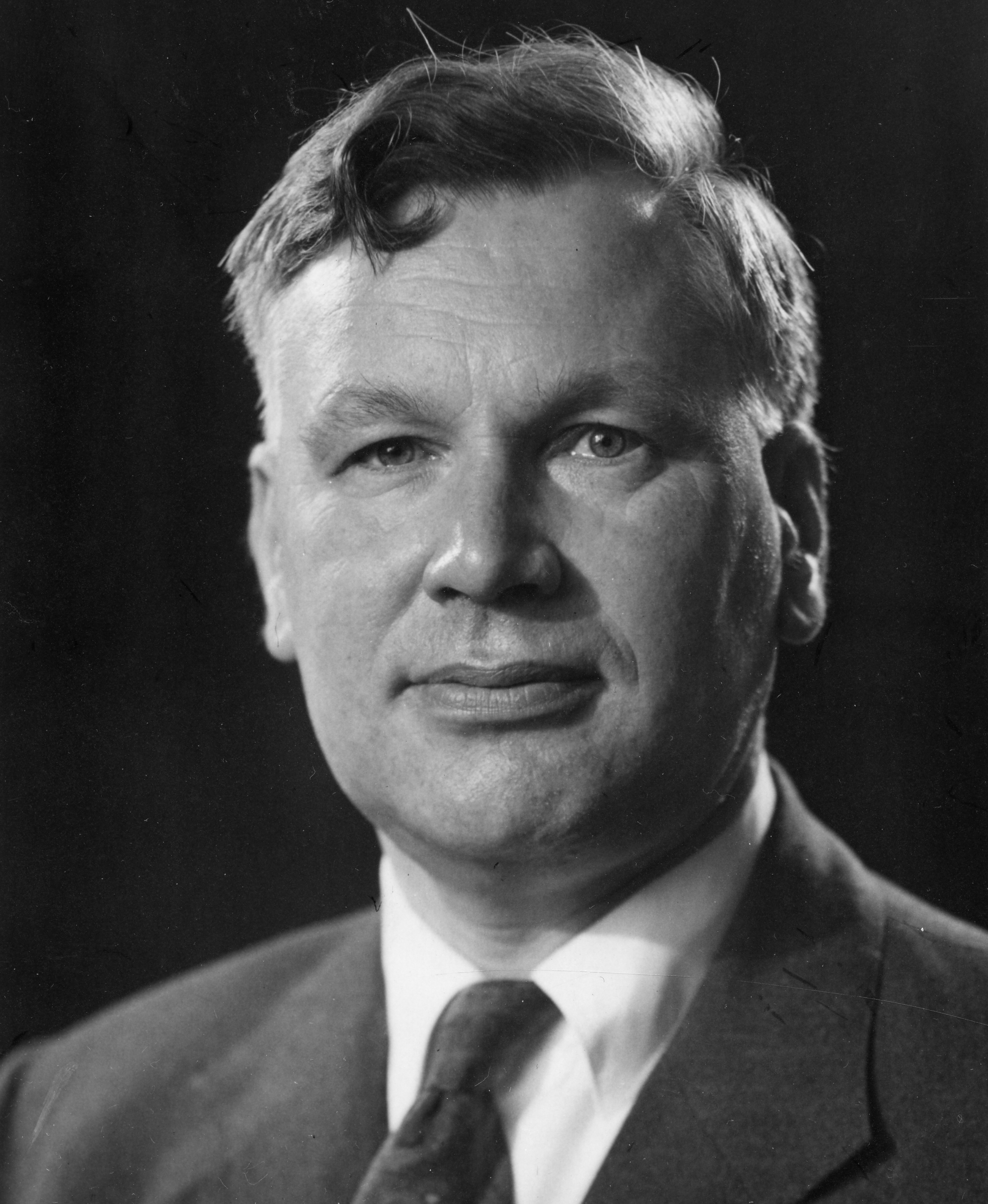
- Born: 24 January 1913; Croydon, London, England
- Died: 24 July 2003 (aged 90)
- Citizenship: British
- Education: University of Cambridge; Princeton University
- Known for: Pryce's theorem
- Awards: FRS (1951)
- Scientific career
- Workplaces: Liverpool University; University of Bristol; University of Southern California; University of British Columbia
- Thesis: The wave mechanics of the photon (1937)
- Doctoral advisor: Max Born; Ralph Fowler
- Doctoral students: Anatole Abragam; David M. Brink; Kenneth Le Couteur; Marshall Stoneham; John Clive Ward; John Ziman

Maurice Henry Lecorney Pryce (24 January 1913 – 24 July 2003) was a British physicist.

== Life ==
Pryce was born in Croydon to an Anglo-Welsh father and French mother, and in his teens attended the Royal Grammar School, Guildford. After a few months in Heidelberg to add German to the French that had been his first language at home, he went to Trinity College, Cambridge.

In 1935, he went to Princeton University, supported by a Commonwealth Fund Fellowship (now Harkness Fellowship) where he worked with Wolfgang Pauli and John von Neumann, obtaining his Ph.D. with a thesis on The wave mechanics of the photon under the supervision of Max Born and Ralph Fowler.

In 1937, he returned to England as a Fellow of Trinity, until, in 1939, he was appointed Reader in Theoretical Physics at Liverpool University under James Chadwick. In 1941, he joined the Admiralty Signals Establishment (now part of the Admiralty Research Establishment) to work on radar. In 1944, he joined the British atomic energy team in Montreal designing nuclear reactors, but, in 1945, returned to England, first to Cambridge and then, in 1946, to Oxford, where he was appointed Wykeham Professor of Physics.

Among his doctoral students were Anatole Abragam and John Clive Ward. In 1947, in collaboration with John Ward, he co-authored a paper that originated on the probability amplitude of two entangled quanta propagating in opposite directions.

In 1950, Klaus Fuchs was head of the theoretical physics group at AERE, Harwell. When Fuchs was arrested for supplying atomic secrets to the USSR, Pryce served part-time as his replacement. In 1954, he moved to the University of Bristol as Head of the Physics Department. In 1964, he returned to North America, first to the University of Southern California and then, in 1968, to the University of British Columbia. From 1968 to 1978, he served on the Technical Advisory Committee (for nuclear waste management) of Atomic Energy of Canada Limited.

== Distinctions ==
- 1935 Fellow, Cambridge Philosophical Society
- 1936 Member, American Physical Society
- 1938 Fellow, Royal Astronomical Society
- 1946 Fellow, Physical Society (London); Member of Council 1959–61
- 1951 Fellow of the Royal Society
- 1957 Member of Radar and Signals Advisory Board, Ministry of Supply
- 1958 Member of Electronics Research Council, Ministry of Aviation
- 1959 Member (later Chairman) Advisory Council, Royal Military College of Science, Shrivenham
- 1960 Honorary Member of Council, Société de Physique, Paris

== See also ==
- Pseudo Jahn–Teller effect
