= List of India women's national football team hat-tricks =

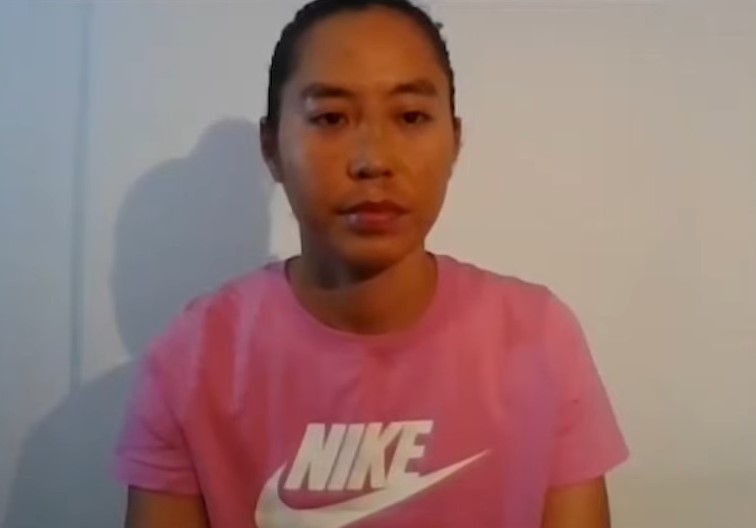
Ngangom Bala Devi has scored a hat-trick 7 times, the most by any Indian footballer.

India women's national football team started playing in the late 1970s. Their first major tournament was 1980 AFC Women's Championship. In the next edition of the tournament in 1981, the first ever hat-trick (three or more goals in a match) for India was scored by Shanti Mullick. She scored 4 goals in a 5−0 victory over Singapore on 8 June 1981. She was also the first player to score more than three goals in a match for India. In the 1981 edition two hat-tricks were scored, the second one was scored by Shukla Nag in an 8−0 win over Philippines. As of 25 May 2026, 22 different players had scored 34 hat-tricks for India.

2010 South Asian Games−football tournament was the first tournament where three different players scored hat-trick for India. Mandakini Devi scored against Sri Lanka, Bembem Devi scored against Pakistan and Naobi Chanu scored against Bangladesh, which helped India to reach the final of the tournament and eventually they won the gold medal. The first player to score a double hat-trick (six goals) in a single match for India was Sasmita Mallik. She scored seven goals in an 18−0 victory over Bhutan at the 2010 SAFF Women's Championship, which is India's biggest win till date. Along with Mallik, Ngangom Bala Devi and Tababi Devi also scored hat-trick in that match; thus this became the most hat-tricks scored in a single match by Indian players.

However, a similar feat was achieved at the 2014 SAFF Women's Championship by the Indian team when Indumathi Kathiresan, Bala Devi and Irom Prameshwori Devi scored one hat-trick each in 12−0 victory over Afghanistan on 17 September 2014. In the same edition, Bala Devi scored three hat-tricks; scored one each against the Maldives, Afghanistan and Nepal, the most by any Indian in a single tournament. These helps her to take her tally to 16 goals in 5 matches − the highest by any player in a single edition of the championship. Bala Devi went on to score 7 hat-tricks in her international career, the most by an Indian. Kamala Devi achieved the feat thrice, where as, Shanti Mullick, Bembem Devi, Sasmita Mallik and Pyari Xaxa each scored two hat-tricks for the national team. The most recent hat-trick was scored by Aveka Singh in a 11−0 victory over Maldives at the 2026 SAFF Women's Championship on 25 May 2026.

== Hat-tricks for India ==
As of 25 May 2026, twenty-two players have scored a hat-trick for the national team.
Result in the table lists India's goal tally first.

Date	Goals	Player	Opponent	Venue	Competition	Result	Ref.
8 June 1981	4	Shanti Mullick	Singapore	Mong Kok Stadium, Hong Kong	1981 AFC Women's Championship	5−0	
10 June 1981	4	Shukla Nag	Philippines	Mong Kok Stadium, Hong Kong	1981 AFC Women's Championship	8−0	
10 April 1983	4	Shanti Mullick	Philippines	National Stadium, Thailand	1983 AFC Women's Championship	5−0	
9 December 1997	3	Chaoba Devi Langam	Guam	Guangdong, China	1997 AFC Women's Championship	10−0	
9 December 1997	5	Lokeshwari Devi	Guam	Guangdong, China	1997 AFC Women's Championship	10−0	
12 June 2005	5	Sujata Kar	Guam	Mỹ Đình National Stadium, Vietnam	2006 AFC Women's Asian Cup qualification	10−0	
29 January 2010	3	Mandakini Devi Moirangthem	Sri Lanka	Kamalapur, Dhaka, Bangladesh	2010 South Asian Games	8−1	
29 January 2010	3	Bembem Devi Oinam	Pakistan	Kamalapur, Dhaka, Bangladesh	2010 South Asian Games	6−0	
29 January 2010	3	Naobi Chanu Laishram	Bangladesh	Kamalapur, Dhaka, Bangladesh	2010 South Asian Games	7−0	
13 December 2010	7	Sasmita Mallik	Bhutan	Bir Shrestha Ruhul Amin Stadium, Bangladesh	2010 SAFF Women's Championship	18−0	
13 December 2010	5	Bala Devi Ngangom	Bhutan	Bir Shrestha Ruhul Amin Stadium, Bangladesh	2010 SAFF Women's Championship	18−0	
13 December 2010	4	Tababi Devi Thongam	Bhutan	Bir Shrestha Ruhul Amin Stadium, Bangladesh	2010 SAFF Women's Championship	18−0	
17 December 2010	3	Kamala Devi Yumnam	Bangladesh	Bir Shrestha Ruhul Amin Stadium, Bangladesh	2010 SAFF Women's Championship	6−0	
21 December 2010	3	Bala Devi Ngangom	Pakistan	Bir Shrestha Ruhul Amin Stadium, Bangladesh	2010 SAFF Women's Championship	8−0	
18 March 2011	3	Bala Devi Ngangom	Bangladesh	B. S. Mohammad Mostafa Stadium, Bangladesh	2012 Summer Olympics qualifiers	3−0	
11 September 2012	3	Pinky Bompal Magar	Bhutan	CR & FC Grounds, Sri Lanka	2012 SAFF Women's Championship	11−0	
14 September 2012	3	Kamala Devi Yumnam	Afghanistan	CR & FC Grounds, Sri Lanka	2012 SAFF Women's Championship	11−0	
14 September 2012	3	Bembem Devi Oinam	Afghanistan	CR & FC Grounds, Sri Lanka	2012 SAFF Women's Championship	11−0	
14 September 2014	5	Sasmita Mallik	Maldives	Namdong Asiad Rugby Field, South Korea	2014 Asian Games	15−0	
14 September 2014	5	Kamala Devi Yumnam	Maldives	Namdong Asiad Rugby Field, South Korea	2014 Asian Games	15−0	
13 November 2014	4	Bala Devi Ngangom	Maldives	Jinnah Sports Stadium, Pakistan	2014 SAFF Women's Championship	8−0	
17 November 2014	3	Indumathi Kathiresan	Afghanistan	Jinnah Sports Stadium, Pakistan	2014 SAFF Women's Championship	12−0	
17 November 2014	4	Bala Devi Ngangom	Afghanistan	Jinnah Sports Stadium, Pakistan	2014 SAFF Women's Championship	12−0	
17 November 2014	3	Prameshwori Devi Irom	Afghanistan	Jinnah Sports Stadium, Pakistan	2014 SAFF Women's Championship	12−0	
21 November 2014	4	Bala Devi Ngangom	Nepal	Jinnah Sports Stadium, Pakistan	2014 SAFF Women's Championship	6−0	
11 November 2018	4	Bala Devi Ngangom	Bangladesh	Thuwunna Stadium, Myanmar	2020 AFC Women's Olympic qualifiers	7−1	
27 January 2019	3	Ratanbala Devi Nongmaithem	Indonesia	Benteng Taruna Stadium, Indonesia	Friendly	3−0	
1 March 2019	3	Sanju Yadav	Turkmenistan	Gold City Ground, Alanya, Turkey	2019 Turkish Women's Cup	10−0	
10 September 2022	4	Anju Tamang	Maldives	Dashrath Stadium, Kathmandu, Nepal	2022 SAFF Women's Championship	9−0	
30 December 2024	3	Pyari Xaxa	Maldives	Padukone – Dravid Centre for Sports Excellence, Bengaluru, India	Friendly	14−0	
30 December 2024	4	Lynda Kom	Maldives	Padukone – Dravid Centre for Sports Excellence, Bengaluru, India	Friendly	14−0	
2 January 2025	4	Lhingdeikim Kipgen	Maldives	Padukone – Dravid Centre for Sports Excellence, Bengaluru, India	Friendly	11−1	
23 June 2025	5	Pyari Xaxa	Mongolia	700th Anniversary Stadium, Chiang Mai, Thailand	2026 AFC Women's Asian Cup qualification	13−0	
25 May 2026	4	Aveka Singh	Maldives	Jawaharlal Nehru Stadium, Margao, India	2026 SAFF Women's Championship	11−0	

== See also ==
- India women's national football team results
