= Ashalata Devi Loitongbam =

Indian footballer (born 1993)

Ashalata Devi
Personal information
- Full name: Ashalata Devi Loitongbam
- Date of birth: 3 July 1993 (age 33)
- Place of birth: Imphal, Manipur, India
- Position: Defender

Team information
- Current team: East Bengal
- Number: 4

Senior career*
Years	Team	Apps	(Gls)
- KRYPHSA
2015	New Radiant		
2016–2017	Rising Student		
2017–2018	KRYPHSA		
2018–2020	Sethu	13	(1)
2021–2024	Gokulam Kerala	32	(4)
2024–	East Bengal	14	(1)

International career^{‡}
2008	India U17		
2011–2024	India	100	(4)
- * Club domestic league appearances and goals as of 24 March 2024 ‡ National team caps and goals as of 27 October 2024

Ashalata Devi Loitongbam (Meitei: Loitongbam Ashalata Devi, born 3 July 1993) is an Indian professional footballer who plays as a defender for the Indian Women's League club East Bengal and the India women's national team. Devi is considered one of the finest defenders from Asia and is the first women's footballer to play 100 matches for the Indian national team.

== Early life ==
Devi was born in Imphal, Manipur. She started playing football at the age of 13.

== Club career ==
=== New Radiant ===
In 2015, Devi signed for the Dhivehi Women's Premier League franchise New Radiant W.S.C. She thus became the second Indian to play for a club outside India after Bembem Devi. She won the league with the club in that particular season.

=== Rising Student Club ===
In 2016, Devi signed for the newly formed Rising Student Club to feature in the first edition of the Indian Women's League.

=== KRYPHSA ===
In 2017, Devi joined the Indian Women's League club KRYPHSA F.C. for the 2017–18 Indian Women's League season.

=== Sethu ===
In 2018, Devi transferred to Tamil Nadu based club Sethu FC which participates in the Indian Women's League. In the 2018–19 Indian Women's League season, Sethu won the tournament by defeating Manipur Police SC 1–3 in the finals, where Devi won her maiden Indian Women's League trophy.

== International career ==
In 2008 at the age of 15, Devi was called up for India U17. Devi was called up for the senior team and debuted in the year 2011. She served as the captain of the India women's national football team from 2018 till 2024. Devi played a pivotal role in India's success in qualifying for the 2021 Olympics (supposed to be held in 2020) which is going to be held in Tokyo. Devi has several achievements with the national team. Devi was a part of the Indian tea that won two South Asian Games gold medals in 2016 and 2019 and was also part of the team that won the SAFF Women's Championship four times consecutively, in 2012, 2014, 2016 and finally in 2019. She was nominated by AFC for the women's player of the year in 2019 and was selected as the AIFF women's player of the year for her performance in the 2018–19 campaign.

== Career statistics ==
=== International ===
As of 27 October 2024

National team	Year	Caps	Goals
India	2011	3	0
India	2012	5	0
India	2013	5	0
India	2014	8	1
India	2015	2	1
India	2016	7	1
India	2017	7	0
India	2018	3	0
India	2019	26	1
India	2021	9	0
India	2022	6	0
India	2023	9	0
India	2024	10	0
Total		100	4

=== International goals ===
Scores and results list India's goal tally first.

List of international goals scored by Loitongbam Ashalata Devi
No.	Date	Venue	Opponent	Score	Result	Competition
1	14 September 2014	Incheon Namdong Asiad Rugby Field, Incheon, South Korea	Maldives	10–0	15–0	2014 Asian Games
2	13 March 2015	Mandalar Thiri Stadium, Mandalay, Myanmar	Sri Lanka	2–0	4–0	2016 Olympic Qualifiers
3	15 February 2016	Jawaharlal Nehru Stadium, Shillong, India	Nepal	4–0	4–0	2016 Olympic Qualifiers
4	6 April 2019	Mandalar Thiri Stadium, Mandalay, Myanmar	Nepal	3–1	3–1	2020 Olympic Qualifiers

== Honours ==
India

- SAFF Women's Championship: 2012, 2014, 2016, 2019
- South Asian Games Gold medal: 2016, 2019

East Bengal

- SAFF Women's Club Championship: 2025
- Indian Women's League: 2024–25, 2025–26

Sethu

- Indian Women's League: 2018–19

Gokulam Kerala

- Indian Women's League: 2021–22, 2022–23

Railways

- Rajmata Jijabai Trophy: 2015–16

New Radiant

- FAM Women's Football Championship: 2015

Individual

- Indian Women's League Best Defender: 2021–22
- AIFF women's player of the year: 2018–19
- AFC women's player of the year 2019: Nominee

== See also ==
- List of Indian football players in foreign leagues
