= 2025 FAM Women's League =

Football league season in the Maldives

FAM Women's League
- Season: 2025–26
- Dates: 1 December – 23 December
- Champions: Maziya (1st title)
- Matches: 15
- Goals: 60 (4 per match)
- Best player: Rekha Poudel; Fathimath Saliya
- Top goalscorer: Leyla Rameshovna (9 goals)

The 2025 FAM Women's League is the first season of the FAM Women's League, a women's football league in Maldives. The season began on 1 December and scheduled until 23 December 2025.

== Teams ==
A total of 6 teams entered the inaugural league, Five Dhivehi Premier League sides – Maziya, Trust and Care Football Club, Victory Sports Club, New Radiant, Odi Sports Club and one Second Division side – Biss Buru Sports Club.

=== Teams and their divisions ===
Team	Division	Stadium	Capacity
Biss Buru Sports Club	Maafannu	Henveiru Stadium (Gameweek 1–4) National Stadium (Gameweek 5)	500 4,000
Maziya	West Maafannu	Henveiru Stadium (Gameweek 1–4) National Stadium (Gameweek 5)	500 4,000
New Radiant	Henveiru	Henveiru Stadium (Gameweek 1–4) National Stadium (Gameweek 5)	500 4,000
Odi Sports Club	Galolhu	Henveiru Stadium (Gameweek 1–4) National Stadium (Gameweek 5)	500 4,000
TC Sports Club	Henveiru	Henveiru Stadium (Gameweek 1–4) National Stadium (Gameweek 5)	500 4,000
Victory Sports Club	Galolhu	Henveiru Stadium (Gameweek 1–4) National Stadium (Gameweek 5)	500 4,000

=== Personnel and kits ===
Team	Head coach	Captain	Kit manufacturer	Main sponsor	Other sponsors
Biss Buru Sports Club	(Maldives) Mohamed Ihan Saeed	(Maldives) Shaufa Ibrahim	A10	NV Store; Val Collection	List: Back: House of Jewel Gadi Fihaara 70 Number
Maziya	(Maldives) Ahmed Ahsan	(Maldives) Aishath Sama	Island Apparels	Ooredoo Maldives	None
New Radiant	(Maldives) Ismail Anil	(Maldives) Fadhuwa Zahir	Kappi	Damietta; Lushé Salon	List: Back: Mendhuru TV Brine Rooftop; Sleeves: Harins
Odi Sports Club	(Maldives) Ahmed Nashid	(Maldives) Fathimath Saliya	Obion	Obion	List: Back: Nasru Speed
TC Sports Club	(Maldives) Faruhad Ismail	(Maldives) Saha Abdul Rahman	Kappi	The W Sports	None
Victory Sports Club	(Maldives) Aminath Siyana	(Maldives) Shiyana Ahmed Zahir	Jozti	Damietta	List: Back: Mendhuru TV China Garden Kappi; Sleeves: Harins

=== Foreign players ===
Club	Visa 1	Visa 2
Biss Buru Sports Club	(Indonesia) Nopi Ramadhan	(Indonesia) Nanik Ningraeni Sundari
Maziya	(Nepal) Rekha Poudel	(Nepal) Dipa Shahi
New Radiant	(Indonesia) Prihatini	(Thailand) Ruttawalin Intabumrung
Odi Sports Club	(Indonesia) Nastasia Suci	(Indonesia) Rihla Nuer Aulia
TC Sports Club	(Sri Lanka) Praveena Perera	(Sri Lanka) Tharushika Dilshani
Victory Sports Club	(Uzbekistan) Leyla Rustullayeva	(Uzbekistan) Rushaniya Safina

== League table ==
Pos	Team	Pld	W	D	L	GF	GA	GD	Pts	Result
1	Maziya (C)	5	4	1	0	19	2	+17	13	Champions
2	Odi Sports	5	3	1	1	16	3	+13	10	
3	Victory	5	2	2	1	13	3	+10	8	
4	New Radiant	5	2	2	1	11	4	+7	8	
5	TC Sports	5	1	0	4	1	27	−26	3	
6	Biss Buru Sports	5	0	0	5	0	21	−21	0	

Source: Football Association of Maldives
Rules for classification: 1) Points; 2) Head-to-head points; 3) Head-to-head goal difference; 4) Head-to-head goals scored; 5) Goal difference; 6) Goals scored.
(C) Champions

== Results ==
=== Week 1 ===
1 December 2025 1	Victory	6–0	TC Sports	Henveiru Stadium, Malé
16:00	Leyla Rustullayeva 9', 34', 62', 70+1'; Fathimath Saina 23'; Rushaniya Safina 66'	Report

2 December 2025 2	New Radiant	1–1	Odi Sports	Henveiru Stadium, Malé
16:00	Fathimath Faiha Ali Hassan 3'	Report	57' Fathimath Theeba

3 December 2025 3	Biss Buru Sports	0–2	Maziya	Henveiru Stadium, Malé
16:00		Report	58' (pen.) Shahfa Shiuth; 70+3' Fathimath Nihama

=== Week 2 ===
5 December 2025 4	TC Sports	0–7	Odi Sports	Henveiru Stadium, Malé
16:00		Report	5', 29' (pen.), 39', 45' Fathimath Saliya; 9' Farah Ahmed; 17' Aishath Althaf Mohamed 35+3' (pen.) Fathimath Inaasha Adam

6 December 2025 5	Maziya	2–2	Victory	Henveiru Stadium, Malé
16:00	Rekha Poudel 10', 31'	Report	46' Leyla Rustullayeva; 56' Aishath Shana Shareef

7 December 2025 6	New Radiant	6–0	Biss Buru Sports	Henveiru Stadium, Malé
16:00	Mariyam Noora 15'; Maeesha Abdul Hannan 24', 64'; Fathimath Faiha Ali Hassan 33', 56'; Fadhuwa Zahir 67'	Report

=== Week 3 ===
10 December 2025 7	Biss Buru Sports	0–7	Odi Sports	Henveiru Stadium, Malé
16:00		Report	Rihla 11', 37'; Saliya 13', 23', 24'; Inasha 40', 45'

11 December 2025 8	TC Sports	0–10	Maziya	Henveiru Stadium, Malé
16:00		Report	Thaany 6' (og); Sama 14'; Dipa Shahi 35', 40', 46', 66', 73'; Rekha Poudel 44', 45'; Faathimath Inaaya 56'

12 December 2025 9	New Radiant	0–0	Victory	Henveiru Stadium, Malé
16:00		Report

=== Week 4 ===
15 December 2025 10	New Radiant	0–3	Maziya	Henveiru Stadium, Malé
16:00		Report

16 December 2025 11	TC Sports	1–0	Biss Buru Sports	Henveiru Stadium, Malé
16:00		Report

17 December 2025 12	Odi Sports	1–0	Victory	Henveiru Stadium, Malé
16:00		Report

=== Week 5 ===
21 December 2025 13	TC Sports	0–4	New Radiant	National Football Stadium, Malé
16:00

22 December 2025 14	Biss Buru Sports	0–5	Victory	National Football Stadium, Malé
16:00

23 December 2025 15	Maziya	2–0	Odi Sports	National Football Stadium, Malé
16:00		Report

== Season statistics ==
As of 23 December 2025

=== Hat-tricks ===
Player	For	Against	Result	Date
(Uzbekistan) Leyla Rustullayeva^{4}	Victory	TC Sports	6–0	1 December 2025
(Maldives) Fathimath Saliya^{4}	Odi Sports	TC Sports	7–0	5 December 2025
(Maldives) Fathimath Saliya	Odi Sports	Biss Buru Sports	7–0	10 December 2025
(Nepal) Dipa Shahi^{5}	Maziya	TC Sports	10-0	11 December 2025
(Uzbekistan) Leyla Rustullayeva^{4}	Victory	Biss Buru Sports	5–0	22 December 2025

Note: ^{4} – player scored 4 goals
Note: ^{5} – player scored 5 goals

== Awards ==
Award	Winner
Top Scorer	(Uzbekistan) Leyla Rameshovna (Victory)
Best Foreign Player	(Nepal) Rekha Poudel (Maziya)
Best Maldivian Player	(Maldives) Fathimath Saliya (Odi Sports)
Most Promising Player	(Maldives) Aishath Shaha Shareef (Victory)
Fair Play Team	(Maldives) Biss Buru Sports
