= 2015–16 Senior Women's National Football Championship =

2015–16 Women's National Football Championship
21st Senior Women's National Football Championship

Tournament details
- Country: India
- Dates: 12–27 December 2015
- Teams: 29

Final positions
- Champions: Railways (1st title)
- Runners-up: Manipur

Tournament statistics
- Matches played: 43
- Goals scored: 231 (5.37 per match)
- Top goal scorer: Bala Devi

Awards
- Best player: Kamala Devi

The 2015–16 Senior Women's Football Championship was the 21st edition of Senior Women's National Football Championship, the women's state competition in Indian football. The tournament qualification round was stated on 12 December 2015 and culminated on 27 December 2015 across five zones – North Zone, South Zone, East Zone, West Zone and North East Zone – throughout the Nation.

The final match was played on 15 January 2016 02:30 PM IST at Railway Stadium, Jabalpur between Manipur and Railways. Railways defeated 18 times champions Manipur in the penalty shoot-out 4–2 after the score line was even 3–3 after extra time.

== Format ==
Twenty Nine states have been divided into five zonal groups. Top two teams from each zone – North, South, East, West and North East—was progressed to the final stage of the competition.

| Round | Match dates | Teams |
|---|---|---|
| Zonal Round | 12 to 27 December 2015 | 29 |
| Final Round | 2 to 15 January 2016 | 10 |

== Zonal Round ==
Advance to Final Round

All times are Indian Standard Time (IST) – UTC+05:30.

=== North Zone ===
*All North Zone matches were played in Greater Noida, Uttar Pradesh between December 22nd to 27th, 2015.

| Pos | Team | Pld | W | D | L | GF | GA | GD | Pts | Qualification |
|---|---|---|---|---|---|---|---|---|---|---|
| 1 | Uttar Pradesh | 4 | 3 | 0 | 1 | 25 | 7 | +18 | 9 | Advance to Final Round |
| 2 | Haryana | 4 | 3 | 0 | 1 | 18 | 3 | +15 | 9 | Advance to Final Round |
| 3 | Delhi | 3 | 2 | 0 | 1 | 10 | 3 | +7 | 6 | |
| 4 | Chandigarh | 3 | 2 | 0 | 1 | 8 | 1 | +7 | 6 | |
| 5 | Uttarakhand | 2 | 1 | 0 | 1 | 1 | 7 | −6 | 3 | |
| 6 | Jammu and Kashmir | 3 | 1 | 0 | 2 | 2 | 16 | −14 | 3 | |
| 7 | Punjab | 3 | 0 | 0 | 3 | 0 | 12 | −12 | 0 | |
| 8 | Himachal Pradesh | 2 | 0 | 0 | 2 | 1 | 16 | −15 | 0 | |

Rules for classification: 1) points; 2) goal difference; 3) goals scored; 4) head-to-head result.

==== Fixtures and results ====
| 22 December 2015 | Chandigarh | 5–0 | Jammu and Kashmir |

| 22 December 2015 | Uttar Pradesh | 14–0 | Himachal Pradesh |

| 23 December 2015 | Delhi | 7–0 | Uttar Pradesh |

| 23 December 2015 | Haryana | 8–0 | Punjab |

| 24 December 2015 | Uttar Pradesh | 1–0 | Chandigarh |

| 24 December 2015 | Jammu and Kashmir | 2–1 | Himachal Pradesh |

| 25 December 2015 | Delhi | 3–0 | Punjab |

| 25 December 2015 | Haryana | 7–0 | Uttarakhand |

| 26 December 2015 | Chandigarh | 3–0 | Haryana |

| 26 December 2015 | Uttar Pradesh | 10–0 | Jammu and Kashmir |

| 27 December 2015 | Delhi | 0–3 | Haryana |

| 27 December 2015 | Uttarakhand | 1–0 | Punjab |

=== South Zone ===
*All South Zone matches were played in Trichy, Tamil Nadu between December 19th to 27th, 2015.

| Pos | Team | Pld | W | D | L | GF | GA | GD | Pts | Qualification |
|---|---|---|---|---|---|---|---|---|---|---|
| 1 | Puducherry | 4 | 4 | 0 | 0 | 21 | 1 | +20 | 12 | Advance to Final Round |
| 2 | Tamil Nadu | 4 | 3 | 0 | 1 | 19 | 6 | +13 | 9 | Advance to Final Round |
| 3 | Kerala | 4 | 2 | 0 | 2 | 10 | 12 | −2 | 6 | |
| 4 | Karnataka | 4 | 1 | 0 | 3 | 3 | 12 | −9 | 3 | |
| 5 | Telangana | 4 | 0 | 0 | 4 | 3 | 25 | −22 | 0 | |

Source: Fixture & Results
Rules for classification: 1) points; 2) goal difference; 3) goals scored; 4) head-to-head result.

==== Fixtures and Results ====
| 19 December 2015 | Tamil Nadu | 1–5 | Puducherry | Trichy |
| | Geethanjali 51' | Report | Sandhiya 2', 73'; Indhumathi 42', 77'; Pradeepa 45' |

| 19 December 2015 | Karnataka | 3–1 | Telangana | Trichy |
| | Kamal 41'; Lilly Mary Thomas 69', 89' | | Roja 78' |

| 21 December 2015 | Puducherry | 4–0 | Karnataka | Trichy |
| | Indumathi 15'; Pradeepa 31'; Sandhiya 40'; Amsavalli 48' | Report |

| 21 December 2015 | Telangana | 2–5 | Kerala | Trichy |
| | Laxmi 31'; Shirisha 87' | | Athulya 12'; Nikhil 27', 88'; Subitha Poovatta 35', 45' |

| 23 December 2015 | Karnataka | 0–4 | Kerala | Trichy |
| | | Report | Nikhila 48', 52', 59'; Fasna 89' |

| 23 December 2015 | Tamil Nadu | 8–0 | Telangana | Trichy |
| | Sumithra 11', 38'; Abarna 17'; Ranjitha 35'; Kalpana 36', 66', 83'; Nandhini 75' | Report |

| 25 December 2015 | Tamil Nadu | 7–1 | Kerala | Trichy |
| | Nandhini 15'; Kalpana 16', 39', 41'; Muthuselvi 33', 45+1'; Juki 49' | Report | Nikhila 77' |

| 25 December 2015 | Puducherry | 9–0 | Telangana | Trichy |
| | Indumathi 1', 34', 51', 64'; Pradeepa 3', 41', 50'; Saranya 21'; Sandhiya 84' | Report |

| 27 December 2015 | Tamil Nadu | 3–0 | Karnataka | Trichy |
| | Vijaya Kumari 48', 71', 82' | Report |

| 27 December 2015 | Kerala | 0–3 | Puducherry | Trichy |
| | | Report | Indumathi 15', 51'; Pradeepa 56' |

=== East Zone ===
*All East Zone matches were played in Nadia, West Bengal between December 21nd to 27th, 2015.

==== A ====
| Pos | Team | Pld | W | D | L | GF | GA | GD | Pts | Qualification |
|---|---|---|---|---|---|---|---|---|---|---|
| 1 | Odisha | 3 | 3 | 0 | 0 | 24 | 0 | +24 | 9 | Advance to Final Round |
| 2 | West Bengal | 3 | 2 | 0 | 1 | 11 | 4 | +7 | 6 | |
| 3 | Sikkim | 3 | 1 | 0 | 2 | 7 | 12 | −5 | 3 | |
| 4 | Chhattisgarh | 3 | 0 | 0 | 3 | 2 | 23 | −21 | 0 | |

Source: Fixtures & Results
Rules for classification: 1) points; 2) goal difference; 3) goals scored; 4) head-to-head result.

===== Fixtures and Results =====
| 21 December 2015 | Chhattisgarh | 0–17 | Odisha | Nadia |

| 21 December 2015 | West Bengal | 5–2 | Sikkim | Nadia |

| 23 December 2015 | Sikkim | 0–5 | Odisha | Nadia |

| 23 December 2015 | West Bengal | 6–0 | Chhattisgarh | Nadia |

| 26 December 2015 | West Bengal | 0–2 | Odisha | Nadia |

| 26 December 2015 | Chhattisgarh | 2–5 | Sikkim | Nadia |

==== B ====
| Pos | Team | Pld | W | D | L | GF | GA | GD | Pts | Qualification |
|---|---|---|---|---|---|---|---|---|---|---|
| 1 | Railways | 2 | 2 | 0 | 0 | 12 | 0 | +12 | 6 | Advance to Final Round |
| 2 | Bihar | 2 | 1 | 0 | 1 | 2 | 11 | −9 | 3 | |
| 3 | Jharkhand | 2 | 0 | 0 | 2 | 1 | 4 | −3 | 0 | |

Source: Fixtures & Results
Rules for classification: 1) points; 2) goal difference; 3) goals scored; 4) head-to-head result.

===== Fixtures and Results =====
| 22 December 2015 | Railways | 10–0 | Bihar | Nadia |

| 24 December 2015 | Bihar | 2–1 | Jharkhand | Nadia |

| 27 December 2015 | Jharkhand | 0–2 | Railways | Nadia |

=== West Zone ===
*All West Zone matches were played in Jabalpur, Madhya Pradesh between December 12th to 19th, 2015.

| Pos | Team | Pld | W | D | L | GF | GA | GD | Pts | Qualification |
|---|---|---|---|---|---|---|---|---|---|---|
| 1 | Goa | 3 | 2 | 1 | 0 | 8 | 2 | +6 | 7 | Advance to Final Round |
| 2 | Madhya Pradesh | 3 | 2 | 0 | 1 | 9 | 3 | +6 | 6 | Advance to Final Round |
| 3 | Maharashtra | 4 | 1 | 1 | 2 | 7 | 11 | −4 | 4 | |
| 4 | Gujarat | 2 | 0 | 0 | 2 | 0 | 8 | −8 | 0 | |

Source: Fixture & Results
Rules for classification: 1) points; 2) goal difference; 3) goals scored; 4) head-to-head result.

==== Fixtures and results ====
| 12 December 2015 | Goa | 4–0 | Gujarat | Jabalpur |

| 13 December 2015 | Madhya Pradesh | 4–1 | Maharashtra | Jabalpur |
| 15:00 |

| 15 December 2015 | Maharashtra | 4–0 | Gujarat | Jabalpur |
| | Alisha Ranekhetwala; Laura Estebeiro |

| 16 December 2015 | Madhya Pradesh | 0–2 | Goa | Jabalpur |

| 18 December 2015 | Goa | 2–2 | Maharashtra | Jabalpur |
| 15:00 |

| 19 December 2015 | Madhya Pradesh | 5–0 | Gujarat | Jabalpur |

=== North East Zone ===
*All North East Zone matches were played in Kokrajhar, Assam between December 18th to 23rd, 2015.

==== A ====
| Pos | Team | Pld | W | D | L | GF | GA | GD | Pts | Qualification |
|---|---|---|---|---|---|---|---|---|---|---|
| 1 | Assam | 2 | 2 | 0 | 0 | 6 | 0 | +6 | 6 | Advance to Final Round |
| 2 | Meghalaya | 2 | 1 | 0 | 1 | 1 | 2 | −1 | 3 | |
| 3 | Arunachal Pradesh | 2 | 0 | 0 | 2 | 0 | 5 | −5 | 0 | |

Source: Fixture & Results
Rules for classification: 1) points; 2) goal difference; 3) goals scored; 4) head-to-head result.

===== Fixtures and Results =====
| 18 December 2015 | Assam | 4–0 | Arunachal Pradesh | Kokrajhar |

| 20 December 2015 | Arunachal Pradesh | 0–1 | Meghalaya | Kokrajhar |

| 22 December 2015 | Assam | 2–0 | Meghalaya | Kokrajhar |

==== B ====
| Pos | Team | Pld | W | D | L | GF | GA | GD | Pts | Qualification |
|---|---|---|---|---|---|---|---|---|---|---|
| 1 | Manipur | 2 | 2 | 0 | 0 | 16 | 0 | +16 | 6 | Advance to Final Round |
| 2 | Tripura | 2 | 1 | 0 | 1 | 3 | 8 | −5 | 3 | |
| 3 | Mizoram | 2 | 0 | 0 | 2 | 1 | 12 | −11 | 0 | |

Source: Fixture & Results
Rules for classification: 1) points; 2) goal difference; 3) goals scored; 4) head-to-head result.

===== Fixtures and Results =====
| 19 December 2015 | Mizoram | 1–3 | Tripura | Kokrajhar |

| 21 December 2015 | Tripura | 0–7 | Manipur | Kokrajhar |

| 23 December 2015 | Manipur | 9–0 | Mizoram | Kokrajhar |
| | Grace Dangmei 2', 50'; Bala Devi 10', 28', 33'; Prameshwori 37', 85'; Bindyarani 56', 71' |

== Final round ==
2015–16 Senior Women's National Football Championship Final Round
Tournament details
- Country: India
- Dates: 2–15 January 2016
- Teams: 10

Tournament statistics
- Matches played: 13
- Goals scored: 126 (9.69 per match)
- All statistics correct as of 16 January 2016.

The final round of the 2015–16 Senior Women's National Football Championship was started on 2 January and culminated on 15 January 2016 with the final.

== Semi-final Qualification ==
Advance to Semi-finals

All times are Indian Standard Time (IST) – UTC+05:30.
*All Final Round matches was played in Jabalpur, Madhya Pradesh between January 2nd to 15th, 2016.

=== Group A ===
| Pos | Team | Pld | W | D | L | GF | GA | GD | Pts | Qualification |
|---|---|---|---|---|---|---|---|---|---|---|
| 1 | Manipur | 4 | 4 | 0 | 0 | 25 | 0 | +25 | 12 | Advance to Semi-finals |
| 2 | Odisha | 4 | 3 | 0 | 1 | 10 | 5 | +5 | 9 | Advance to Semi-finals |
| 3 | Tamil Nadu | 4 | 2 | 0 | 2 | 8 | 9 | −1 | 6 | |
| 4 | Goa | 4 | 0 | 1 | 3 | 0 | 10 | −10 | 1 | |
| 5 | Uttar Pradesh | 4 | 0 | 1 | 3 | 0 | 19 | −19 | 1 | |

Source: 21st Senior Women's National Football Championship: Fixtures & Results
Rules for classification: 1) points; 2) goal difference; 3) goals scored; 4) head-to-head result.

==== Fixtures and Results ====
| 2 January 2016 | Odisha | 5–0 | Uttar Pradesh | Jabalpur |
| 13:00 | | | | Stadium: Railway Stadium |

| 2 January 2016 | Manipur | 6–0 | Goa | Jabalpur |
| 15:00 | | | | Stadium: Railway Stadium |

| 4 January 2016 | Tamil Nadu | 1–4 | Odisha | Jabalpur |
| 13:00 | | | | Stadium: Railway Stadium |

| 4 January 2016 | Uttar Pradesh | 0–0 | Goa | Jabalpur |
| 15:00 | | | | Stadium: Railway Stadium |

| 6 January 2016 | Goa | 0–3 | Tamil Nadu | Jabalpur |
| 13:00 | | | | Stadium: Railway Stadium |

| 6 January 2016 | Uttar Pradesh | 0–10 | Manipur | Jabalpur |
| 15:00 | | | | Stadium: Railway Stadium |

| 8 January 2016 | Tamil Nadu | 0–5 | Manipur | Jabalpur |
| 13:00 | | | | Stadium: Railway Stadium |

| 8 January 2016 | Odisha | 1–0 | Goa | Jabalpur |
| 15:00 | | | | Stadium: Railway Stadium |

| 10 January 2016 | Tamil Nadu | 4–0 | Uttar Pradesh | Jabalpur |
| 13:00 | | | | Stadium: Railway Stadium |

| 10 January 2016 | Manipur | 4–0 | Odisha | Jabalpur |
| 15:00 | | | | Stadium: Railway Stadium |

=== Group B ===
| Pos | Team | Pld | W | D | L | GF | GA | GD | Pts | Qualification |
|---|---|---|---|---|---|---|---|---|---|---|
| 1 | Railways | 4 | 4 | 0 | 0 | 15 | 1 | +14 | 12 | Advance to Semi-finals |
| 2 | Haryana | 4 | 2 | 1 | 1 | 27 | 7 | +20 | 7 | Advance to Semi-finals |
| 3 | Puducherry | 4 | 2 | 1 | 1 | 21 | 6 | +15 | 7 | |
| 4 | Assam | 4 | 1 | 0 | 3 | 4 | 20 | −16 | 3 | |
| 5 | Madhya Pradesh | 4 | 0 | 0 | 4 | 0 | 33 | −33 | 0 | |

Source: 21st Senior Women's National Football Championship: Fixtures & Results
Rules for classification: 1) points; 2) goal difference; 3) goals scored; 4) head-to-head result.

==== Fixtures and Results ====
| 3 January 2016 | Haryana | 14–0 | Madhya Pradesh | Jabalpur |
| 13:00 | | | | Stadium: Railway Stadium |

| 3 January 2016 | Railways | 3–0 | Assam | Jabalpur |
| 15:00 | | | | Stadium: Railway Stadium |

| 5 January 2016 | Puducherry | 0–1 | Railways | Jabalpur |
| 13:00 | | | | Stadium: Railway Stadium |

| 5 January 2016 | Assam | 2–0 | Madhya Pradesh | Jabalpur |
| 15:00 | | | | Stadium: Railway Stadium |

| 7 January 2016 | Madhya Pradesh | 0–10 | Puducherry | Jabalpur |
| 13:00 | | | | Stadium: Railway Stadium |

| 7 January 2016 | Assam | 0–9 | Haryana | Jabalpur |
| 15:00 | | | | Stadium: Railway Stadium |

| 9 January 2016 | Puducherry | 3–3 | Haryana | Jabalpur |
| 13:00 | | | | Stadium: Railway Stadium |

| 9 January 2016 | Railways | 7–0 | Madhya Pradesh | Jabalpur |
| 15:00 | | | | Stadium: Railway Stadium |

| 11 January 2016 | Assam | 2–8 | Puducherry | Jabalpur |
| 13:00 | | | | Stadium: Railway Stadium |

| 11 January 2016 | Haryana | 1–4 | Railways | Jabalpur |
| 15:00 | | | | Stadium: Railway Stadium |

== Bracket ==
Semi-finals
Manipur | 4
Haryana | 2
Railways | 4
Odisha | 0

Finals
Manipur | 3(3)
Railways | 3(4)

== Semi-finals ==
*Semi-finals were played on 13 January 2015.

| Team 1 | Score | Team 2 |
|---|---|---|
| Manipur | 4–2 | Haryana |
| Railways | 4–0 | Odisha |

| 13 January 2016 | Manipur | 4–2 | Haryana | Jabalpur |
| 13:00 | Bembem 18'; Bala Devi 30', 55', 62' | Report | Sanju Yadav 85'; Kavita Devi 86' | Stadium: Railway Stadium |

| 13 January 2016 | Railways | 4–0 | Odisha | Jabalpur |
| 15:00 | Kamala Devi 18'; Manpreet Kaur 69', 76'; Ngoubi Devi 82' | Report | | Stadium: Railway Stadium |

== Finals ==
| 15 January 2016 | Manipur | 3–3 (a.e.t.) (3–4 p) | Railways | Railway Stadium, Jabalpur |
| 14:30 | Bala Devi 20'; Grace 41'; Bembem 100' | Report | Ashalata Devi 22' (pen.); Sasmita Malik 44'; Bijeta Devi 116' |
| | Penalties |
| | Bembem (penalty scored); Bala Devi (penalty missed); Prameshwori Devi (penalty scored); Roshni Devi (penalty scored); Grace (penalty missed) | | (penalty scored) Ashalata Devi; (penalty scored) Premi Devi; (penalty scored) Supriya Routray; (penalty missed) Prameshwori Devi; (penalty scored) Kamala Devi |
