= Bala Devi Ngangom =

Indian footballer (born 1990)

Bala Devi
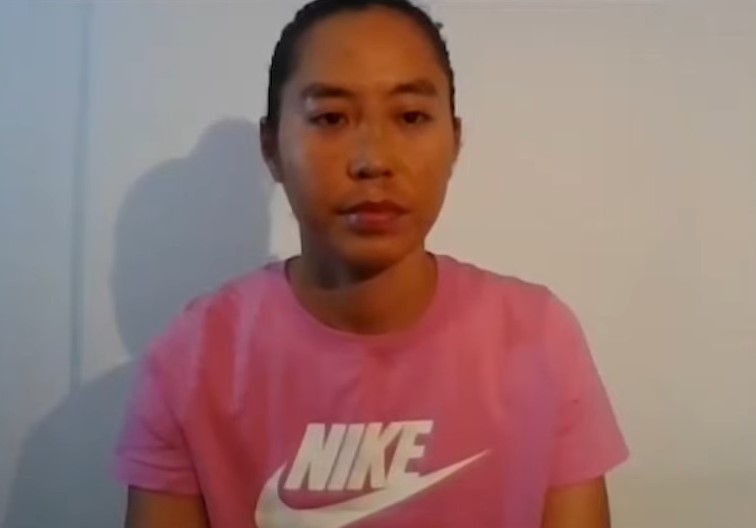

Personal information
- Full name: Ngangom Bala Devi
- Date of birth: 2 February 1990 (age 36)
- Place of birth: Irengbam, Bishnupur district, Manipur, India
- Position: Striker

Team information
- Current team: United Kolkata SC
- Number: 1-

Senior career*
Years	Team	Apps	(Gls)
2015	New Radiant	7	(25)
2016–2017	Manipur Police		
2017	Eastern Sporting Union	3	(4)
2017–2018	KRYPHSA	7	(12)
2018–2019	Manipur Police	7	(26)
2020–2021	Rangers	9	(2)
2022	Manipur Police		
2023	Odisha	8	(6)
2023–2024	Manipur Police		
2024–2026	Sreebhumi	3	(3)
2026–	United Kolkata SC	4	(16)

International career^{‡}
2005	India U17	3	(5)
2006–2007	India U19	8	(5)
2005–2024	India	58	(48)
Medal record
Representing India
SAFF Women's Championship
Winner	2010 Bangladesh
Winner	2014 Pakistan
Winner	2016 India
South Asian Games
Gold medal – first place	2010 Bangladesh	Team
Gold medal – first place	2016 India	Team
Gold medal – first place	2019 Nepal	Team
- * Club domestic league appearances and goals ‡ National team caps and goals as of 27 October 2024

Bala Devi Ngangom (Meitei: Ngangom Bala Devi, born 2 February 1990) is an Indian professional footballer who plays as a forward for the Indian Women's League 2 club United Kolkata SC and the India national team.

== Club career ==
Born in Irengbam village, Bishnupur district in Manipur, Bala Devi grew up playing the game with mainly boys. She was a part of the Manipur U-19 team that took part in the Under-19 Women's Championship in Assam in 2002. After the tournament she was declared the best player of the tournament. She was awarded the same title the next year in 2003. She also earned top-scorer awards at the under-17 level for her state. Eventually, Devi went on to represent the Manipur Senior Women's Football Team in the Rajmata Jijabai Trophy. She was very influential in her state, winning the women's football championship in 2014, scoring a brace as Manipur defeated Odisha in the final 3–1. This was Manipur's first championship since 2010 and their 17th overall. While playing with Manipur, Devi was teammates with India captain and AIFF Women's Player of Year, Oinam Bembem Devi. She finished the tournament scoring 29 goals in seven matches.

During the 2015 National Games of India, Devi represented her state as they won the gold medal. She scored the equalizer in the final against Odisha to make it 1–1 at the Corporation Stadium. The team went on to win the match 4–2 on penalties.

In 2014, Devi signed a contract with New Radiant WSC of Maldives in the FAM Women's Football Championship alongside players Oinam Bembem Devi and Lako Phuti Bhutia.

She played inaugural season of Indian Women's League 2016–17 with Manipur Police Sports Club in qualifying round and in Final Round played with Eastern Sporting Union. In 2017–18 IWL 2nd season she joined KRYPHSA and in 2018–19 IWL 3rd season she re-joined Manipur Police Sports Club.

In January 2020, Devi signed a professional contract of 18 months with Scottish Women's Premier League club Rangers, making her one of the few Indian women to become a professional footballer abroad. On 6 December 2020, she became the first Indian woman to score in a professional football league in Europe by netting for the Rangers, as they won against Motherwell by 9–0. An ankle injury ruled her out for the rest of the matches and she later parted ways with the club.

In December 2022, Devi moved to Spain along with Elangbam Panthoi Chanu, and underwent training cum trial stint at Spanish Segunda Federación club Málaga.

In 2023, she signed with Indian Women's League debutant Odisha WFC.

== International career ==
Devi's first tournament with the national team was at the under-17 level in 2005. She has represented India at the senior level since 2005. She also represented the India women's under-19 side in 2006 and 2007. She was a part of the India team that took part in the first women's SAFF Championship in 2010. On 13 December 2010 she scored five goals in India's opening match of the tournament against Bhutan as India won 18–0. India went on to win the tournament, defeating Nepal 1–0. She scored total 8 goals in 5 matches.

Despite being a part of the 2010 winning team, Devi was not included in the India squad that won the tournament again in 2012. She did return to the team for the 2014 AFC Women's Asian Cup qualifiers in May 2013 but India failed to qualify.

On 27 October 2014, it was announced that Devi was selected into the India squad that was to participate in the 2014 SAFF Women's Championship, her first SAFF Championship since 2010. She started the tournament in fantastic form as she scored four goals in the opening match against Maldives. Her form continued into the next match against Bangladesh as she scored a brace in a 5–1 victory for India. Devi then scored five more goals in the final group stage match against Afghanistan on 17 November. She finished the group stage with eleven goals from three matches.

During the semi-final against Sri Lanka Devi scored only once in a 5–0 thrashing. However, in the final, Devi managed to find the net four times as India defeated Nepal 6–0 to claim their third straight SAFF Championship crown.

Devi finished the 2014 SAFF Championship with sixteen goals in only five matches. Due to her performance in the tournament, Devi was awarded the Women's Player of the Year award by the All India Football Federation. Also awarded in the next year 2015 Indian Women's Player of the Year. In 2016 South Asian Games she scored 3 goals in 5 matches. She also captained India women's national football team in 2016 SAFF Women's Championship. She also clinched the title first time as a captain.

== Personal life ==
While a semi-professional footballer in India, Devi also worked as a policewoman for the Manipur Police. She was promoted to Inspector rank following her impressive performance in football for Rangers. She completed her education at the Oinam Thambal Marik College.

== International statistics ==
As of 27 October 2024

National team	Year	Caps	Goals
India	2007	2	1
India	2008	0	0
India	2009	0	0
India	2010	5	9
India	2011	3	3
India	2012	0	0
India	2013	4	0
India	2014	8	18
India	2015	2	0
India	2016	6	3
India	2017	7	1
India	2018	4	4
India	2019	8	7
India	2020	0	0
India	2021	0	0
India	2022	0	0
India	2023	6	0
India	2024	3	2
Total		58	48

=== International goals ===
As of 27 October 2024
Score and results list India's goal tally first, score column indicates score after Bala Devi's goal.

Key
‡	Indicates goal was scored from a penalty kick

Goal	Cap	Date	Venue	Opponent	Score	Result	Competition	Ref.
1.	1	20 October 2007	Tau Devi Lal Stadium, Gurgaon, India	Iran	2–1	3–1	2008 AFC Women's Asian Cup qualification	
2.	3	13 December 2010	Bir Shrestha Shahid Ruhul Amin Stadium, Cox's Bazar, Bangladesh	Bhutan	1–0	18–0	2010 SAFF Women's Championship	
3.	3	13 December 2010	Bir Shrestha Shahid Ruhul Amin Stadium, Cox's Bazar, Bangladesh	Bhutan	2–0	18–0	2010 SAFF Women's Championship	
4.	3	13 December 2010	Bir Shrestha Shahid Ruhul Amin Stadium, Cox's Bazar, Bangladesh	Bhutan	3–0	18–0	2010 SAFF Women's Championship	
5.	3	13 December 2010	Bir Shrestha Shahid Ruhul Amin Stadium, Cox's Bazar, Bangladesh	Bhutan	4–0	18–0	2010 SAFF Women's Championship	
6.	3	13 December 2010	Bir Shrestha Shahid Ruhul Amin Stadium, Cox's Bazar, Bangladesh	Bhutan	5–0	18–0	2010 SAFF Women's Championship	
7.	4	15 December 2010	Bir Shrestha Shahid Ruhul Amin Stadium, Cox's Bazar, Bangladesh	Sri Lanka	1–0	7–0	2010 SAFF Women's Championship	
8.	6	21 December 2010	Bir Shrestha Shahid Ruhul Amin Stadium, Cox's Bazar, Bangladesh	Pakistan	1–0	8–0	2010 SAFF Women's Championship	
9.	6	21 December 2010	Bir Shrestha Shahid Ruhul Amin Stadium, Cox's Bazar, Bangladesh	Pakistan	4–0	8–0	2010 SAFF Women's Championship	
10.	6	21 December 2010	Bir Shrestha Shahid Ruhul Amin Stadium, Cox's Bazar, Bangladesh	Pakistan	5–0	8–0	2010 SAFF Women's Championship	
11.	8	18 March 2011	Bangabandhu National Stadium, Dhaka, Bangladesh	Bangladesh	1–0	3–0	2012 Summer Olympics qualification	
12.	8	18 March 2011	Bangabandhu National Stadium, Dhaka, Bangladesh	Bangladesh	2–0	3–0	2012 Summer Olympics qualification	
13.	8	18 March 2011	Bangabandhu National Stadium, Dhaka, Bangladesh	Bangladesh	3–0	3–0	2012 Summer Olympics qualification	
14.	15	14 September 2014	Namdong Asiad Rugby Field, Incheon, South Korea	Maldives	3–0	15–0	2014 Asian Games	
15.	15	14 September 2014	Namdong Asiad Rugby Field, Incheon, South Korea	Maldives	8–0	15–0	2014 Asian Games	
16.	18	13 November 2014	Jinnah Sports Stadium, Islamabad, Pakistan	Maldives	1–0	8–0	2014 SAFF Women's Championship	
17.	18	13 November 2014	Jinnah Sports Stadium, Islamabad, Pakistan	Maldives	2–0	8–0	2014 SAFF Women's Championship	
18.	18	13 November 2014	Jinnah Sports Stadium, Islamabad, Pakistan	Maldives	4–0	8–0	2014 SAFF Women's Championship	
19.	18	13 November 2014	Jinnah Sports Stadium, Islamabad, Pakistan	Maldives	5–0	8–0	2014 SAFF Women's Championship	
20.	19	15 November 2014	Jinnah Sports Stadium, Islamabad, Pakistan	Bangladesh	3–1 ‡	5–1	2014 SAFF Women's Championship	
21.	19	15 November 2014	Jinnah Sports Stadium, Islamabad, Pakistan	Bangladesh	5–1	5–1	2014 SAFF Women's Championship	
22.	20	17 November 2014	Jinnah Sports Stadium, Islamabad, Pakistan	Afghanistan	2–0	12–0	2014 SAFF Women's Championship	
23.	20	17 November 2014	Jinnah Sports Stadium, Islamabad, Pakistan	Afghanistan	4–0	12–0	2014 SAFF Women's Championship	
24.	20	17 November 2014	Jinnah Sports Stadium, Islamabad, Pakistan	Afghanistan	6–0	12–0	2014 SAFF Women's Championship	
25.	20	17 November 2014	Jinnah Sports Stadium, Islamabad, Pakistan	Afghanistan	7–0	12–0	2014 SAFF Women's Championship	
26.	20	17 November 2014	Jinnah Sports Stadium, Islamabad, Pakistan	Afghanistan	11–0	12–0	2014 SAFF Women's Championship	
27.	21	19 November 2014	Jinnah Sports Stadium, Islamabad, Pakistan	Sri Lanka	2–0	5–0	2014 SAFF Women's Championship	
28.	22	21 November 2014	Jinnah Sports Stadium, Islamabad, Pakistan	Nepal	2–0	6–0	2014 SAFF Women's Championship	
29.	22	21 November 2014	Jinnah Sports Stadium, Islamabad, Pakistan	Nepal	3–0	6–0	2014 SAFF Women's Championship	
30.	22	21 November 2014	Jinnah Sports Stadium, Islamabad, Pakistan	Nepal	5–0	6–0	2014 SAFF Women's Championship	
31.	22	21 November 2014	Jinnah Sports Stadium, Islamabad, Pakistan	Nepal	6–0	6–0	2014 SAFF Women's Championship	
32.	27	13 February 2016	Jawaharlal Nehru Stadium, Shillong, India	Bangladesh	2–0	5–1	2016 South Asian Games	
33.	27	13 February 2016	Jawaharlal Nehru Stadium, Shillong, India	Bangladesh	5–1	5–1	2016 South Asian Games	
34.	28	15 February 2016	Jawaharlal Nehru Stadium, Shillong, India	Nepal	3–0	4–0	2016 South Asian Games	
35.	35	7 April 2017	Kim Il-sung Stadium, Pyongyang, North Korea	Uzbekistan	1–4	1–7	2018 AFC Women's Asian Cup qualification	
36.	40	11 November 2018	Thuwunna Stadium, Yangon, Myanmar	Bangladesh	2–0	7–1	2020 AFC Women's Olympic Qualifying Tournament	
37.	40	11 November 2018	Thuwunna Stadium, Yangon, Myanmar	Bangladesh	3–0	7–1	2020 AFC Women's Olympic Qualifying Tournament	
38.	40	11 November 2018	Thuwunna Stadium, Yangon, Myanmar	Bangladesh	5–0	7–1	2020 AFC Women's Olympic Qualifying Tournament	
39.	40	11 November 2018	Thuwunna Stadium, Yangon, Myanmar	Bangladesh	7–0	7–1	2020 AFC Women's Olympic Qualifying Tournament	
40.	42	29 August 2019	Yakkasary Stadium, Tashkent, Uzbekistan	Uzbekistan	1–0	1–5	Friendly	
41.	46	3 December 2019	Pokhara Rangasala, Pokhara, Nepal	Maldives	2–0	5–0	2019 South Asian Games	
42.	46	3 December 2019	Pokhara Rangasala, Pokhara, Nepal	Maldives	3–0	5–0	2019 South Asian Games	
43.	47	5 December 2019	Pokhara Rangasala, Pokhara, Nepal	Sri Lanka	6–0	6–0	2019 South Asian Games	
44.	48	7 December 2019	Pokhara Rangasala, Pokhara, Nepal	Nepal	1–0	1–0	2019 South Asian Games	
45.	49	9 December 2019	Pokhara Rangasala, Pokhara, Nepal	Nepal	1–0	2–0	2019 South Asian Games	
46.	49	9 December 2019	Pokhara Rangasala, Pokhara, Nepal	Nepal	2–0	2–0	2019 South Asian Games	
47.	56	17 October 2024	Dasharath Rangasala, Kathmandu, Nepal	Pakistan	3–0	5–2	2024 SAFF Women's Championship	
48.	57	23 October 2024	Dasharath Rangasala, Kathmandu, Nepal	Bangladesh	1–3	1–3	2024 SAFF Women's Championship	

Note
Eleven matches which Devi played, one against Chinese club Century Park FC in 2014 where Devi scored a hattrick; match played against Spanish club UD Alzira in 2018 where she scored a goal; three matches played during 2018 Cotif Cup against Fundación Albacete, Levante UD & Madrid CFF; two friendlies played against CF Athletico Carcer, where she scored a goal and UD Alzira in 2019; and four matches played during 2019 Cotif Cup against Villarreal CF, Bolivia U20, Mauritania & Spain U20 where she scored two goals, are not FIFA A international matches and thus the seven goal that she scored are also not considered FIFA A international goals.

== Honours ==
India

- SAFF Women's Championship: 2010, 2014, 2016
- South Asian Games Gold medal: 2016, 2019

Eastern Sporting Union

- Indian Women's League: 2016–17

Manipur

- Rajmata Jijabai Trophy: 2006–07, 2007–08, 2008–09, 2013–14, 2019–20, 2023–24
- National Games Gold medal: 2022

New Radiant WSC

- FAM Women's Football Championship: 2015

Individual

- Indian Women's League Top Scorer: 2017–18, 2018–19
- AIFF Women's Player of the Year (3): 2014, 2015, 2020–21
- AFC International Player of the Week (2): December 2020, May 2021
- FAM Women's Football Championship Best Player: 2015
- FAM Women's Football Championship Top Scorer: 2015 (with 25 goals)
- Rajmata Jijabai Trophy MVP: 2023–24

== See also ==
- List of Indian football players in foreign leagues
- List of Indian Women's League hat-tricks
