= Lako Phuti Bhutia =

Indian footballer

Personal information
- Date of birth: 20 October 1994 (age 32)
- Place of birth: Sribadam, Sikkim, India
- Position: Defender

Youth career
- Mangalbari Women's FA

Senior career*
Years	Team	Apps	(Gls)
2014–2017	Bodyline SC		
2014	New Radiant		
2017–2019	Gokulam Kerala		
2018	Sunrise FC		
2021	Shirsh Bihar United		

International career
2012	India U19		
2013–2019	India	8	(1)
- * Club domestic league appearances and goals

Lako Phuti Bhutia (born 20 October 1994) is an Indian former footballer who played for the India women's national football team.

== Career ==
Bhutia who hails from Sribadam, a remote place in West Sikkim is a product of the Mangalbari Women's Football Academy. The defender horned her skills under coach Palden Bhutia.

She also played for Maldivian club New Radiant S.C. in 2014. Then she joined Gokulam Kerala FC for 2017–18 Indian Women's League season.

Bhutia also played for Sunrise WFC in Bhutan Women's National Championship in 2018.

== International ==
In 2012, she was called up to the Under-19 National Team for the 2013 AFC U-19 Women's Championship qualification in Malaysia. She became the 4th Girl from the state to represent the National Team after Pushpa Chetri, Anuradha Chetri and Nima Lhamu Bhutia. She attended a one-month coaching camp at Gandhinagar, Gujarat with the U-19 squad before leaving for Malaysia.

She along with her sister Nima Lhamu Bhutia was selected for the Senior Women's National Football Coaching Camp, which was held from 1 April 2013. This Camp was held for the selection of the Senior National Team for the Asian Cup qualifying round. Her sister could not attend the camp for personal reasons. Lako has represented the National Team 8 times and has 1 goal to her credit.

== Honours ==
India

- SAFF Women's Championship: 2014, 2019

New Radiant WSC

- FAM Women's Football Championship: 2014

Sunrise FC

- Women's National League runner-up: 2018

== See also ==
- List of Indian football players in foreign leagues
