= Fadhuwa Zahir =

Maldivian association football player

Personal information
- Full name: Fadhuwa Zahir
- Date of birth: 7 May 1986 (age 40)
- Place of birth: Malé, Maldives
- Height: 1.70 m (5 ft 7 in)
- Position: Forward

Team information
- Current team: Maziya Cruise

Senior career*
Years	Team	Apps	(Gls)
2012	Dhivehi Sifainge Club	6	(6)
2014	New Radiant	5	(3)
2014	Själevads IK		
2015	New Radiant		
2025	New Radiant	2	(1)
2026	Maziya Cruise	1	(2)

International career
2004–	Maldives	12	(11)
- * Club domestic league appearances and goals

Fadhuwa Zahir (Dhivehi: ފަދުވާ ޒާހިރު; born 7 May 1987) is a Maldivian footballer who plays as a striker and captains the Maldives women's national football team. She also played for Maldives women's national basketball team at the 2010 Asian Games in Guangzhou.

== Career ==
In 2014, Zahir signed for Swedish side Själevad. In 2019, she received the National Award of Encouragement.

== International goals ==
No.	Date	Venue	Opponent	Score	Result	Competition	Ref.
1.	25 June 2013	Rasmee Dhandu Stadium, Malé, Maldives	Qatar	1–0	1–0	Friendly	
2.	27 June 2013	Rasmee Dhandu Stadium, Malé, Maldives	Qatar	1–0	3–0	Friendly	
3.	27 June 2013	Rasmee Dhandu Stadium, Malé, Maldives	Qatar	2–0	3–0	Friendly	
4.	11 February 2016	Jawaharlal Nehru Stadium, Shillong, India	Sri Lanka	1–0	2–1	2016 South Asian Games	
5.	11 February 2016	Jawaharlal Nehru Stadium, Shillong, India	Sri Lanka	2–0	2–1	2016 South Asian Games	
6.	26 December 2016	Kanchenjunga Stadium, Siliguri, India	Sri Lanka	2–0	5–2	2016 SAFF Women's Championship	
7.	26 December 2016	Kanchenjunga Stadium, Siliguri, India	Sri Lanka	3–2	5–2	2016 SAFF Women's Championship	
8.	26 December 2016	Kanchenjunga Stadium, Siliguri, India	Sri Lanka	4–2	5–2	2016 SAFF Women's Championship	
9.	30 December 2016	Kanchenjunga Stadium, Siliguri, India	Bhutan	1–0	3–1	2016 SAFF Women's Championship	
10.	30 December 2016	Kanchenjunga Stadium, Siliguri, India	Bhutan	3–1	3–1	2016 SAFF Women's Championship	
11.	11 November 2018	Faisal Al-Husseini International Stadium, Al-Ram, Palestine	Indonesia	1–3	1–3	2020 AFC Women's Olympic Qualifying Tournament	

== Honours ==
New Radiant

- FAM Women's Football Championship: 2014, 2015

Individual

- FAM Women's Football Championship top scorer: 2012 (6 goals) (Note: Shared with Fathimath Afza)
- FAM Women's Football Championship best five: 2012, 2014, 2015
- President of the Maldives National Award of Recognition: 2019
