= 2014 FAM Women's Football Championship =

Tournament details
- Country: Maldives
- Teams: 4

Final positions
- Champions: New Radiant W.S.C. (1st title)
- Runner-up: MNDF

Tournament statistics
- Matches played: 9
- Goals scored: 34 (3.78 per match)
- Top goal scorer(s): Oinam Bembem Devi (6 goals)

Awards
- Best player: Oinam Bembem Devi

The 2014 FAM Women's Football Championship (also known as STO Noofahi Women's Football Championship, as the main sponsor is STO), is the second season of the FAM Women's Football Championship. The competition began on 8 June 2014.

== Teams ==
4 teams participated in the competition.

- Maldives National Defence Force (MNDF)
- New Radiant W.S.C.
- Police Club
- Sun Hotels and Resorts

== League round ==
Times are Islamabad, Karachi (UTC+5). Top 3 teams among this league round will be qualifies for the semi-finals.

Team	Pld	W	D	L	GF	GA	GD	Pts
New Radiant W.S.C.	3	2	1	0	8	0	+8	7
Sun Hotels and Resorts	3	2	0	1	6	5	+1	6
MNDF	3	1	1	1	4	4	0	4
Police Club	3	0	0	3	2	11	-9	0

8 June 2014	Sun Hotels and Resorts	4–0	Police Club	FAM No.1 Turf Ground, Malé
21:00	Aiminath Shamila; Hajra Khan	Report (in Dhivehi)

9 June 2014	New Radiant W.S.C.	0–0	MNDF	FAM No.1 Turf Ground, Malé
21:00		Report

11 June 2014	New Radiant W.S.C.	4–0	Police Club	FAM No.1 Turf Ground, Malé
16:45	Hawwa Haneefa; Aishath Shama; Shahula Shafeeq; Fadhuwa Zahir	Report (in Dhivehi)

11 June 2014	MNDF	1–2	Sun Hotels and Resorts	FAM No.1 Turf Ground, Malé
21:00	Aiminath Zaahiya pen.'	Report (in Dhivehi)	Hashini Madushani; Aiminath Nazra

13 June 2014	Police Club	2–3	MNDF	FAM No.1 Turf Ground, Malé
16:45	Sanfaa Ibrahim Didi 40', 44'	Report (in Dhivehi)	37', 64' Aiminath Zaahiya; 66' Sinwa Abdul Latheef

13 June 2014	Sun Hotels and Resorts	0–4	New Radiant W.S.C.	FAM No.1 Turf Ground, Malé
21:15		Report (in Dhivehi)	Oinam Bembem Devi; Aishath Shama; Shahula Thaufeeq

== Semi final ==
Top 2 teams of the League Round will be the teams to play in the first semi final match and the winners will directly get their place in the final. Loser of this match will have to play in the second semi final match against the third team in the League round. Winner of this second semi final match will be the second team to play in the final.

16 June 2014 First Semi	New Radiant W.S.C.	5–1	Sun Hotels and Resorts	National Football Stadium, Malé
21:15	Oinam Bembem Devi; Fadhuwa Zahir; Shahula Thaufeeq	Report (in Dhivehi)	Hajra Khan

18 June 2014 Second Semi	MNDF	1–1 (4–2 p)	Sun Hotels and Resorts	National Football Stadium, Malé
21:15	Aiminath Zaahiya	Report (in Dhivehi)	Hashini Madushani
	Penalties
	Aminath Zaahiya (penalty scored); Fathimath Afza (penalty scored); Aishath Maeesha (penalty scored); Mariyam Rifa (penalty scored)		(penalty scored) Aishath Mahin; (penalty scored) Areesha Riza

== Final ==
21 June 2014	New Radiant W.S.C.	4–1	MNDF	National Football Stadium, Malé
16:00	Oinam Bembem Devi 9', 26'; Aishath Shama 12'; Hawwa Haneefa 33'	Report	36' Mariyam Rifa

== Awards ==
=== Most promising player ===
- Fathimath Shaila Afzal (SHR)

=== Best player ===
- Oinam Bembem Devi (NRWSC)

=== Best 4 players ===
- Oinam Bembem Devi (NRWSC)
- Fadhuwa Zahir (NRWSC)
- Aiminath Zahiya (MNDF)
- Hajra Khan (SHR)
- Aishath Mahin (SHR)

=== Top goal scorer ===
- Oinam Bembem Devi (NRWSC)

=== Fair play team ===
- Sun Hotels and Resorts
