= 2012 FAM Women's Football Championship =

Tournament details
- Country: Maldives
- Teams: 5

Final positions
- Champions: Sun Hotels and Resorts (1st title)
- Runner-up: MNDF

Tournament statistics
- Matches played: 13
- Goals scored: 37 (2.85 per match)
- Top goal scorer(s): Fadhuwa Zahir (MNDF); Fathimath Afza (SHR) (6 goals each)

The 2012 FAM Women's Football Championship was the inaugural staging of the FAM Women's Football Championship in the Maldives. The competition began on 15 December 2012, and ended on 30 December 2012.

== Teams ==
5 teams participated in the competition.

- Sun Hotels and Resorts
- Maldives National Defence Force (MNDF)
- Iskandhar School Parent Teacher Association (Iskandhar School PTA)
- Maldives Broadcasting Corporation (MBC)
- L. Gan Thudi Society for Thudi Advancement and Recreation (L. STAR)

== League round ==
Times are Islamabad, Karachi (UTC+5). Top 4 teams among this league round will be qualifies for the semi-finals.

Team	Pld	W	D	L	GF	GA	GD	Pts
MNDF	4	4	0	0	9	0	+9	12
Sun Hotels and Resorts	4	3	0	1	12	1	+11	9
Iskandhar School PTA	4	1	1	2	9	3	+6	4
L. STAR	4	1	1	2	1	4	-3	4
MBC	4	0	0	4	0	23	−23	0

15 December 2012	Iskandhar School PTA	0–0	L. STAR	Henveiru Stadium, Malé
16:00		Report (in Dhivehi)

16 December 2012	Sun Hotels and Resorts	7–0	MBC	Henveiru Stadium, Malé
16:00	Aminath Zahiya 25', 56', 62'; Fathmath Afza 32', 34', 36', 42'	Report

18 December 2012	Sun Hotels and Resorts	0–1	MNDF	Henveiru Stadium, Malé
16:25		Report (in Dhivehi)	Fadhuwa Zahir

19 December 2012	MBC	0–1	L. STAR	Henveiru Stadium, Malé
16:25		Report	14' Aishath Shama

20 December 2012	MNDF	1–0	Iskandhar School PTA	Henveiru Stadium, Malé
16:25	Fadhuwa Zahir 11' (pen.)	Report; Report (in Dhivehi)

21 December 2012	Sun Hotels and Resorts	3–0	L. STAR	Henveiru Stadium, Malé
16:25	Aishath Mahin 3'; Aminath Zahiya 38'; Fathmath Afza 61'	Report; Report (in Dhivehi)

22 December 2012	MNDF	6–0	MBC	Henveiru Stadium, Malé
16:25	Fadhuwa Zahir; Mariyam Mirufath; Aiminath Dhimna; Shahula Thaufeeq o.g.'	Report (in Dhivehi)

23 December 2012	Sun Hotels and Resorts	2–0	Iskandhar School PTA	Henveiru Stadium, Malé
16:25	Fathmath Afza; Aminath Zaahiya	Report; Report (in Dhivehi)

24 December 2012	L. STAR	0–1	MNDF	Henveiru Stadium, Malé
16:25		Report (in Dhivehi)	Fadhuwa Zahir

25 December 2012	Iskandhar School PTA	9–0	MBC	Henveiru Stadium, Malé
16:25	Fathimath Shaaliya; Maayan Mohamed	Report (in Dhivehi)

== Semi final ==
27 December 2012	MNDF	3–2	L. STAR	Rasmee Dhandu Stadium, Malé
16:25	Fadhuwa Zahir; Mariyam Mirufath; Aminath Azeema	Report	Aishath Shaalee; Aishath Shama

28 December 2012	Sun Hotels and Resorts	0–0 (a.e.t.) (5–4 p)	Iskandhar School PTA	Rasmee Dhandu Stadium, Malé
16:25		Report
	Penalties
	Nashima Ibrahim (penalty scored); Aminath Zahiya (penalty scored); Fathimath Afza (penalty scored); Areesha Riza (penalty missed); Aishath Mahin (penalty missed); Farah Ahmed (penalty scored); Fathimath Sameera (penalty scored)		(penalty scored) Fathimath Saliya; (penalty missed) Mariyam Mohamed; (penalty scored) Sheeneez Mohammed; (penalty missed) Shiyana Ahmed Zuhair; (penalty scored) Simwa Abdul Latheef; (penalty scored) Fathimath Shabana; (penalty missed) Yumna Abdul Azeez

== Final ==
30 December 2012	MNDF	0–1	Sun Hotels and Resorts	Rasmee Dhandu Stadium, Malé
16:25		Report; Report (in Dhivehi)	30' Aminath Eenaz

== Awards ==
Awards were given by the president of the Football Association of Maldives, Ali Azim.

=== Best 5 players ===
- Fadhuwa Zahir (MNDF)
- Aminath Zahiya (Sun)
- Fathimath Shaliya (Iskandhar School PTA)
- Fathimath Afza (Sun)
- Aminath Leeza (MNDF)

=== Fair play team ===
- L. Gan Thudi Society for Thudi Advancement and Recreation (L. STAR)

== Prize money ==
The prize money given to the top two teams.

Final placing	Prize money (Maldivian rufiyaa)
Champions	MVR 15,000
Runner-up	MVR 10,000
