= FAM Women's League =

Maldivian Women's professional football league

- Organising body: Football Association of Maldives (FAM)
- Founded: 2025; 1 year ago
- Country: Maldives
- Confederation: AFC
- Number of clubs: 6
- Level on pyramid: 1
- Current champions: Maziya (1st title)
- Most championships: Maziya (1 title)
- Broadcaster: YES
- Current: 2026 FAM Women's League

The FAM Women's League is the top-tier women's football league in the Maldives, organized by the Football Association of Maldives. The league officially began its inaugural season on 1 December 2025, marking the first time FAM has launched a full league competition for women in the country.

== History ==
=== Early attempts (2012–2015) ===
Efforts to organize structured women's football competitions in the Maldives began with the FAM Women's Football Championship, first held in 2012. The tournament was played again in 2014 and 2015, but after three editions the competition was discontinued due to various organizational challenges.

=== Cancelled league attempt in 2017 ===
In 2017, Football Association of Maldives attempted to launch a women's league for the first time. However, the initiative was cancelled after clubs reported insufficient preparation time following the league announcement, resulting in an inadequate number of teams registering.

=== Renewed discussions (2019–2021) ===
In March 2019, then FAM President Bassam Adeel Jaleel announced renewed plans to establish a permanent women’s football league. Due to the limited number of women players in the country, FAM consulted with FIFA and proposed an 8-a-side format.

In December 2021, FAM introduced a 9-a-side Invitational Championship across five regions — Lhaviyani Atoll, Kulhudhuffushi, Laamu Atoll, Fuvahmulah, and Malé. The champions of each region were planned to compete in a national final round. However, the tournament was discontinued after completing only the first regional event in Lh. Naifaru.

=== Establishment of the Women's League (2025) ===
On 26 July 2025, newly elected FAM President Ahmed Thariq announced that a women's league would be included in the official FAM calendar. The federation formally confirmed the FAM Women's League to be played from 1–23 December 2025.

Five Dhivehi Premier League sides – Maziya, Trust and Care Football Club, Victory Sports Club, New Radiant, Odi Sports Club and one Second Division side – Biss Buru Sports Club participated in the first season. FAM also announced that each participating team would receive MVR 100,000 in financial support, with the help of FIFA, during the inaugural season.

The FAM Women's League represents the first sustained league-format competition for women's football in the Maldives, following several earlier attempts to establish long-term structures for the women's game.

== Clubs ==
The following six clubs competed in the inaugural 2025 season:

Team	Location	Stadium	Capacity
Biss Buru Sports Club	Maafannu	Henveiru Stadium	500
Maziya	West Maafannu	Henveiru Stadium	500
New Radiant	Henveiru	Henveiru Stadium	500
Odi Sports Club	Galolhu	Henveiru Stadium	500
TC Sports Club	Henveiru	Henveiru Stadium	500
Victory Sports Club	Galolhu	Henveiru Stadium	500

== Champions ==
Season	Winners	Runners-up	Topscorer
2025	Maziya	Odi Sports	(Uzbekistan) Leyla Rustullayeva (9 goals)
2026			

== Stadiums ==
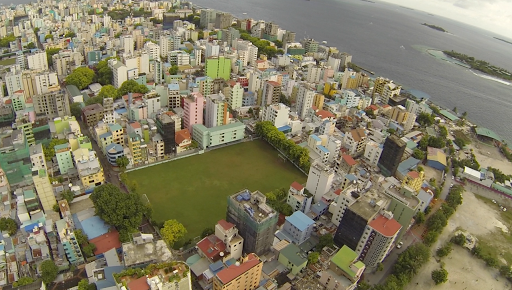
Drone shot of Henveiru Stadium

Originally, all matches of the inaugural league were scheduled to be held at the National Football Stadium, Malé. However, due to heavy rainfall causing severe damage to the grass pitch days before kick-off, FAM moved the matches to Henveiru Stadium, with the advice of Ministry of Sports, Fitness and Recreation. The venue shift was confirmed just before the league began on 1 December 2025.

On 18 December 2025, FAM announced that the last three matches of the league to be played at the National Football Stadium.

== Broadcasting ==
Broadcasting rights for the inaugural FAM Women's League were awarded to YES TV, operated by the Public Service Media under the MoU signed between them and Football Association of Maldives as the official broadcasting partner for the 2025–26 Maldivian football season. Matches were also streamed live through YES TV's Facebook and YouTube channels, providing nationwide coverage for the first women's league competition.
