= AIFF Player of the Year Awards =

Indian annual association football awards

- Sport: Association football
- Country: India
- Presented by: All India Football Federation

History
- First award: Men's (M): 1992; Women's (W): 2001
- First winner: M: I. M. Vijayan; W: Bembem Devi
- Most wins: M: Sunil Chhetri (7 awards); W: Bala Devi (3 awards)
- Most recent: M: Subhasish Bose (2024–25); W: Soumya Guguloth (2024–25)
- Website: www.the-aiff.com

The AIFF Player of the Year Awards are the annual awards presented to the best footballers in India by the All India Football Federation (AIFF). The AIFF first announced the award for Men's Player of the Year in 1992; (Note: From 1992 to 2017, the award was given for the performance of the player for that year and was mostly awarded at the end of that year. Since 2018, the award has been given for a football season and awarded in the middle of the year.) I. M. Vijayan was the inaugural winner. No winner was announced in 1998 and 1999. It was re-introduced in 2000 and Vijayan won it for the second time becoming the first player to do so. Sunil Chhetri has won the award a record seven times. Jo Paul Ancheri, Bhaichung Bhutia and Lallianzuala Chhangte have each won the award twice. Subhasish Bose is the most recent winner in the men's category.

The AIFF Women's Player of the Year Award was introduced in 2001. Bembem Devi was its first recipient. No winner was given out from 2002 up to 2012. In 2013, the award was re-introduced and Bembem Devi won it for the second time. Other than Bembem Devi, Bala Devi and Manisha Kalyan have won the award multiple times. Bala Devi has won the award thrice, whereas Kalyan won the award twice. Soumya Guguloth is the most recent winner in this category.

Along with the men's and women's awards, the AIFF Emerging Player of the Year Award for men was introduced in 2013. Jeje Lalpekhlua was the inaugural winner. He went on to win the Men's Player of the Year Award for 2016. Sandesh Jhingan is the only other player to have won both the awards. Anirudh Thapa is the only player to have won this award twice. In 2015, Pyari Xaxa became the inaugural winner of the award in the women's category. Sanju Yadav and Kalyan are the only players to have won both the Emerging player of the Year and the Player of the Year Award for women. In 2024, the award was renamed as Promising Player of the Year Award. Brison Fernandes and Thoibisana Chanu are the most recent winners in the men's and women's categories respectively.

Until 2016, the men's awards were selected on the basis of voting by the coaches of the I-League clubs. Since 2017, coaches of both the I-League and the Indian Super League have voted to select the winner. The women's awards are selected by the head coach of the women's national team in consultation with the AIFF Technical Director.

== Men's Player of the Year ==
I. M. Vijayan was the first player to receive the award in 1992. He was also the first player to win it consecutively for 1997 and 2000 (there was no award in 1998 and 1999). He has won the award three times. Sunil Chhetri has received the award a record seven times: for 2007, 2011, 2013, 2014, 2017, 2018−19 and most recently, 2021−22. Jo Paul Ancheri, Bhaichung Bhutia and Lallianzuala Chhangte are the other players who have won this award more than once.

Winner by years
Year	Player	Ref.
1992	I. M. Vijayan	
1993	V. P. Sathyan	
1994	Jo Paul Ancheri	
1995	Bhaichung Bhutia	
1996	Bruno Coutinho	
1997	I. M. Vijayan	
1998	Not awarded	
1999	Not awarded	
2000	I. M. Vijayan	
2001	Jo Paul Ancheri	
2002	Deepak Mondal	
2003	Tomba Singh	
2004	Shanmugam Venkatesh	
2005	Climax Lawrence	
2006	Surkumar Singh	
2007	Sunil Chhetri	
2008	Bhaichung Bhutia	
2009	Subrata Pal	
2010	Gouramangi Singh	
2011	Sunil Chhetri	
2012	Syed Rahim Nabi	
2013	Sunil Chhetri	
2014	Sunil Chhetri	
2015	Eugeneson Lyngdoh	
2016	Jeje Lalpekhlua	
2017	Sunil Chhetri	
2018–19	Sunil Chhetri	
2019–20	Gurpreet Singh Sandhu	
2020–21	Sandesh Jhingan	
2021–22	Sunil Chhetri	
2022–23	Lallianzuala Chhangte	
2023–24	Lallianzuala Chhangte	
2024–25	Subhasish Bose	

Multiple winners
Wins	Player
7	Sunil Chhetri
3	I. M. Vijayan
2	Jo Paul Ancheri
2	Bhaichung Bhutia
2	Lallianzuala Chhangte

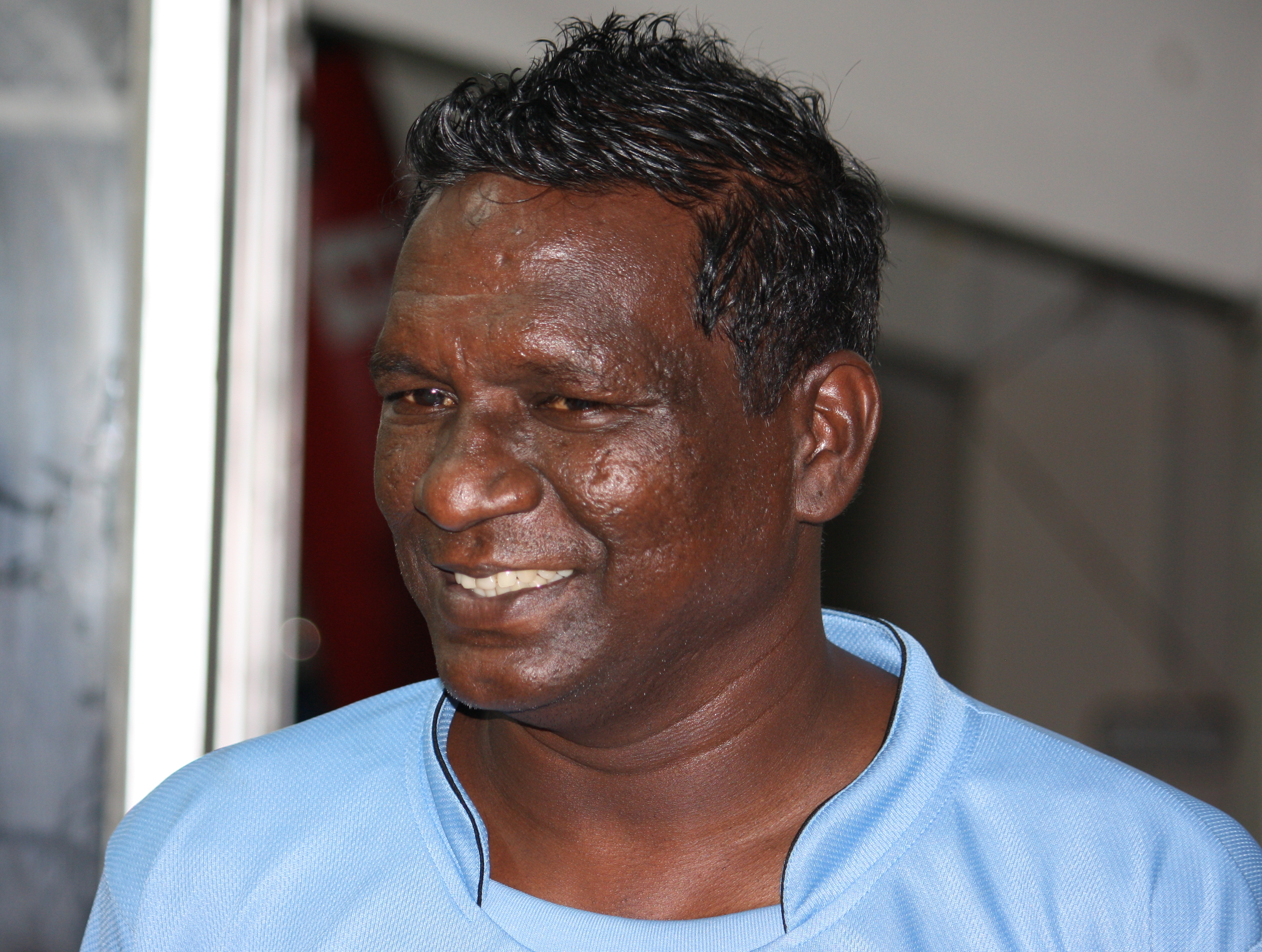
I. M. Vijayan, the first recipient of the award, was also the first player to win for a second time. He won the award three times.

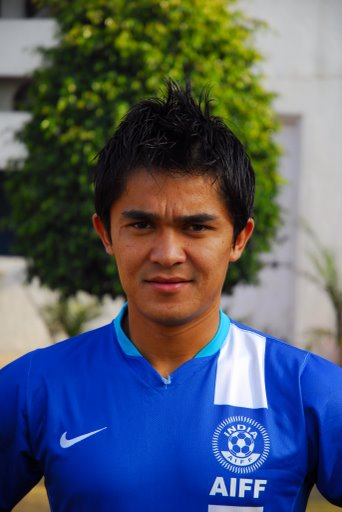
Sunil Chhetri has been chosen as the Men's Player of the Year seven times, more than any other player.

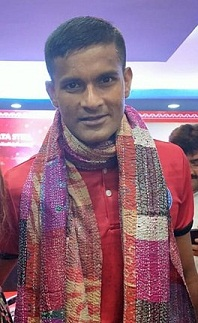
Subrata Pal was the first goalkeeper to win the award.

== Women's Player of the Year ==
Bembem Devi was the first recipient of the award in 2001. It was not awarded again until 2013, when Bembem Devi retained it. Bala Devi has won the award a record three times: for 2014, 2015 and 2020−21. Manisha Kalyan won the award consecutively for 2020−21 and 2022−23.

Winner by years
Year	Player	Ref.
2001	Bembem Devi	
2002−2012	Not awarded	
2013	Bembem Devi	
2014	Bala Devi	
2015	Bala Devi	
2016	Sasmita Malik	
2017	Kamala Devi	
2018−19	Ashalata Devi	
2019−20	Sanju Yadav	
2020−21	Bala Devi	
2021−22	Manisha Kalyan	
2022–23	Manisha Kalyan	
2023–24	Indumathi Kathiresan	
2024–25	Soumya Guguloth	

Multiple winners
Wins	Player
3	Bala Devi
2	Bembem Devi
2	Manisha Kalyan

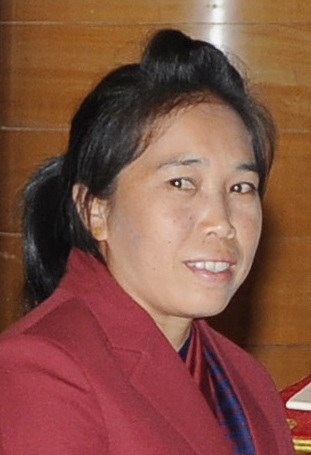
Bembem Devi was the first recipient of the Award. She won the award twice.

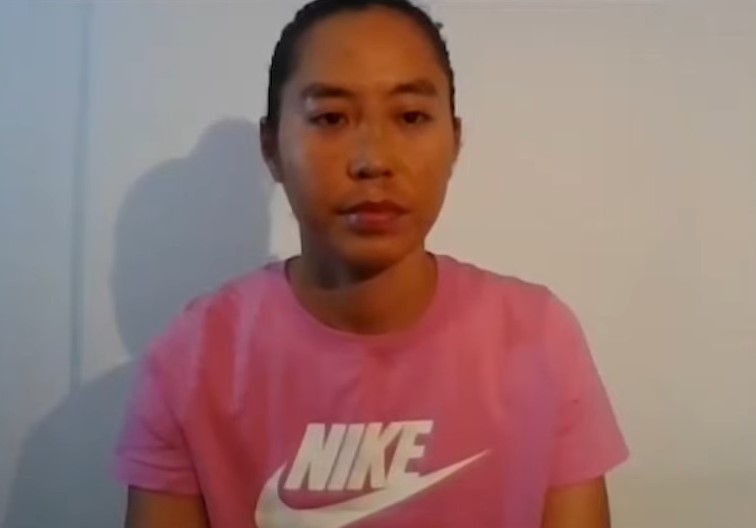
Bala Devi has been chosen as the Women's Player of the Year thrice, more than any other player.

== Promising Player of the Year ==
The award was introduced as Emerging Player of the Year Award in 2013. Later in 2024, the award was renamed as Promising Player of the Year Award. Jeje Lalpekhlua was the inaugural winner of the award for men in 2013. In the next year, Sandesh Jhingan won the award. Both Lalpekhlua and Jhingan went on to win the Player of the Year Award for 2016 and 2020–21 respectively. They are the only players to have won both the awards. Anirudh Thapa is the only player to have won the award twice. He won the award for 2017 and 2019−20.

A similar award for women was introduced in 2015. Pyari Xaxa was the inaugural winner. Sanju Yadav and Kalyan won the award for 2016 and 2020−21 respectively. Both Yadav and Kalyan went on to win the Player of the Year Award for 2019−20 and 2021−22 respectively. They are the only players to have achieved the feat of winning both the women's awards.

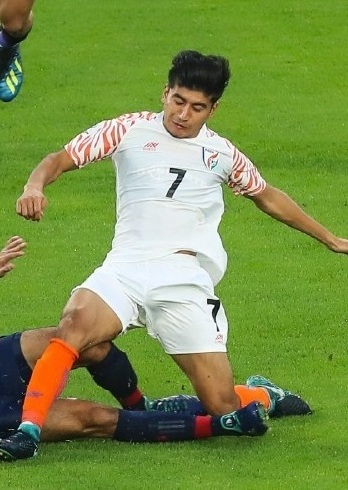
1. Anirudh Thapa is the only player to have won the award twice.

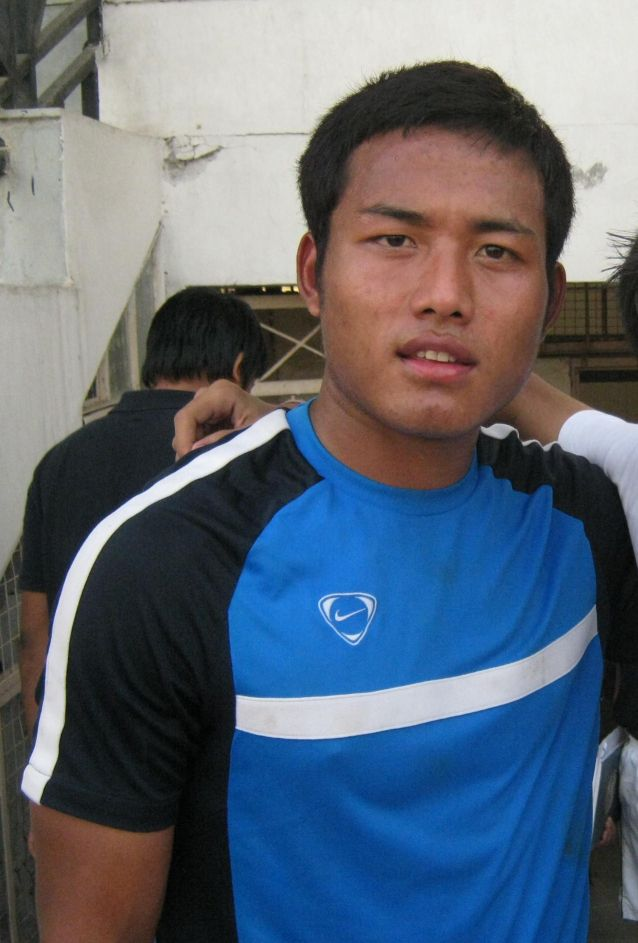
2. Jeje Lalpekhlua was the first player to have won both the Player of the Year Award and the Promising Player of the Year Award.

Men's Promising Player of the Year
Year	Player	Ref.
2013	Jeje Lalpekhlua	
2014	Sandesh Jhingan	
2015	Pritam Kotal	
2016	Rowllin Borges	
2017	Anirudh Thapa	
2018−19	Sahal Abdul Samad	
2019−20	Anirudh Thapa	
2020−21	Suresh Singh Wangjam	
2021−22	Vikram Pratap Singh	
2022–23	Akash Mishra	
2023–24	David Lalhlansanga	
2024–25	Brison Fernandes	

Women's Promising Player of the Year
Year	Player	Ref.
2015	Pyari Xaxa	
2016	Sanju Yadav	
2017	Panthoi Chanu	
2018−19	Dangmei Grace	
2019−20	Ratanbala Devi	
2020−21	Manisha Kalyan	
2021−22	Martina Thokchom	
2022–23	Shilji Shaji	
2023–24	Neha Sillay	
2024–25	Thoibisana Chanu	

== See also ==
- FPAI Indian Player of the Year
- Football in India
