= 2013–14 Senior Women's National Football Championship =

Tournament details
- Country: India
- Teams: 24

Final positions
- Champions: Manipur (17th title)
- Runners-up: Odisha

Tournament statistics
- Matches played: 63
- Goals scored: 395 (6.27 per match)
- Top goal scorer(s): Bala Devi (29 goals)

Awards
- Best player: Bala Devi (Manipur)

The 2013–14 Senior Women's National Football Championship was 20th edition of Senior Women's National Football Championship, the women's state competition in Indian football. The tournament will begin from 27 April till 11 May 2014 in the districts of Dibrugarh and Golaghat in Assam.

Twenty states have been divided into four groups of five with defending champions Odisha in Group B along with Karnataka, Goa, Mizoram, and Gujarat. The most accomplished side in the Tournament Manipur have been clubbed in Group A along with Railways, Chhattisgarh, Uttar Pradesh and Maharashtra. In Group C two-time Champions West Bengal have been pitted against Delhi, Kerala, Bihar, Tripura while Group D comprises Jharkhand, Assam, Puducherry, Tamil Nadu, and Uttarakhand.

In the finals played at Golaghat Stadium, Golaghat, Assam. Manipur defeated defending champion Odisha 3–1 to clinch the 20th senior National women’s football championship title, it was 17th crown overall for Manipur.

== Group stage ==
Key to colours in group tables
Group winners will advance to the knockout stage

=== Group A ===
Team	Pld	W	D	L	GF	GA	GD	Pts
Manipur	5	5	0	0	55	1	+54	15
Railways	5	4	0	1	64	4	+60	12
Maharashtra	5	3	0	2	22	20	+12	9
Madhya Pradesh	5	2	0	3	5	27	−22	6
Chhattisgarh	5	1	0	4	5	44	−39	3
Uttar Pradesh	5	0	0	5	0	55	−55	0

=== Group B ===
Team	Pld	W	D	L	GF	GA	GD	Pts
Odisha	5	5	0	0	26	0	+26	15
Haryana	5	3	1	1	23	8	+15	10
Goa	5	2	2	1	16	6	+10	8
Mizoram	5	2	1	2	10	6	−4	7
Karnataka	5	1	0	4	9	14	−5	3
Gujarat	5	0	0	5	1	51	−50	0

=== Group C ===
Team	Pld	W	D	L	GF	GA	GD	Pts
Delhi	5	4	1	0	9	4	+5	13
West Bengal	5	3	0	2	8	6	+2	9
Kerala	5	2	2	1	8	7	−1	8
Bihar	5	2	1	2	11	9	−2	7
Sikkim	5	2	0	3	6	9	−3	6
Tripura	5	0	0	5	6	13	−7	0

=== Group D ===
Team	Pld	W	D	L	GF	GA	GD	Pts
Jharkhand	5	4	1	0	24	2	+22	13
Puducherry	5	3	1	1	39	4	+35	10
Tamil Nadu	5	2	3	0	14	3	+11	9
Assam	5	2	1	2	19	4	+15	7
Uttarakhand	5	1	0	4	1	52	−51	3
Arunachal Pradesh	5	0	0	5	0	32	−32	0

== Semi-finals ==
10 May 2014
14:00 IST

Manipur	7–0	Delhi
Bembem Devi 24'; Bala Devi 27', 55', 82'; Grace Dangmei 39'; Prameshwori Devi (?); Ngonbi Devi 90+4'	Report

Bokakhat, Assam
10 May 2014
14:00 IST

Odisha	3–0	Jharkhand
Jabamani Soren 23', 54'; Subhaprava Rout 70'	Report

Golaghat, Assam

== Final ==
12 May 2014
14:00 IST

Odisha	1–3	Manipur
Nesa 90+1'	Report	B. Devi 3', 55'; O. Devi 20'

Golaghat Stadium, Golaghat, Assam
