= Tomba Singh Wangkheirakpam =

Indian footballer (born 1982)

Tomba Singh
Personal information
- Full name: Tomba Singh Wangkheirakpam
- Date of birth: 3 April 1982 (age 44)
- Place of birth: Imphal, Manipur, India
- Height: 1.78 m (5 ft 10 in)
- Position: Midfielder

Team information
- Current team: Youth Welfare Club (head coach)

Youth career
- 1998–1999: USA Club Manipur

Senior career*
Years	Team	Apps	(Gls)
1999–2002	Air India		
2002–2004	Salgaocar	35	(3)
2004–2007	Mohun Bagan		
2007–2008	East Bengal		
2011–2012	Salgaocar		
2012–2013	Churchill Brothers	14	(0)
2013–2014	→ Rangdajied (on loan)	15	(1)
2014–2015	Bharat	4	(0)
2016	NEROCA		
2016–	Southern Samity		
2018	TRAU		

International career
2002	India U23		
2002–2004	India	12	(1)

Managerial career
- 2020–2021: NEROCA (assistant coach)
- 2026–: Youth Welfare Club Thambalkhong
- * Club domestic league appearances and goals as of 3 March 2018

Tomba Singh Wangkheirakpam (Meitei: Wangkheirakpam Tomba Singh, born 3 April 1982) is an Indian football coach and former footballer who played as a midfielder. He is the current assistant coach of the I-League club NEROCA. He is currently the head coach of the Indian Women's League 2 club Youth Welfare Club.

== Career ==
Tomba began his footballing career with YWC, Thambalkhong in the junior level before his steep climb to the senior division. After donning colours of ESU, Wangkhei and USA, Khurai Tomba also played a major role in the State team lifting the Under-19 national Football championship held at Imphal where the hosts defeated Sikkim 4–1 in the final.

Catching the eye of talent hunters at the Under-19 championship Tomba started playing for Air India since 1998 before moving to Salgaocar.

== Career statistics ==
=== International ===
National team	Year	Apps	Goals
India	2002	2	0
India	2003	5	0
India	2004	5	1
India	Total	12	1

== Honours ==
India U23

- LG Cup: 2002

India

- Afro-Asian Games silver medal: 2003

Maharashtra

- Santosh Trophy: 1999–2000

Manipur

- Santosh Trophy: 2002–03

Individual

- AIFF Player of the Year: 2003
