= Manpreet Kaur (footballer) =

Indian footballer

Personal information
- Date of birth: 16 August 1990 (age 36)
- Place of birth: Chandigarh, India
- Position: Midfielder

Team information
- Current team: Kickstart FC Karnataka
- Number: 7

Senior career*
Years	Team	Apps	(Gls)
- Railways Football Team
- Football Club Kolhapur City
- United Warriors Sporting Club
- Gokulam Kerala
- Jeppiaar Institute Of Technology FC
- Quartz Soccer Club
- Kickstart FC Karnataka

International career^{‡}
2010–2014	India		
- * Club domestic league appearances and goals ‡ National team caps and goals as of 21 November 2014

Manpreet Kaur (born 16 August 1990) is an Indian footballer who plays as a midfielder for Kickstart FC Karnataka. She has been a member of the India women's national team.

== Club career ==
Playing for Railways, Manpreet scored a brace during the semifinal match of the 2015–16 Rajmata Jijabai Trophy. Her team would eventually become champion.

== International career ==
Manpreet capped for India at senior level during the 2014 SAFF Women's Championship.

== Honours ==
India

- SAFF Women's Championship: 2010, 2014

Railways

- Rajmata Jijabai Trophy: 2015–16
