= Amoolya Kamal =

Indian footballer and coach (born 1984)

Personal information
- Full name: Amoolya Kamal
- Date of birth: 11 July 1984 (age 42)
- Place of birth: Bangalore, Karnataka, India
- Position: Midfielder

Senior career*
Years	Team	Apps	(Gls)
- Bengaluru United
- Karnataka

International career
2007–2014	India		

Managerial career
- 2023: Karnataka women
- * Club domestic league appearances and goals

Amoolya Kamal (born 11 July 1984) is an Indian football coach and former footballer who played as a midfielder.

== Early life ==
Amoolya was born in Bangalore to footballer parents Kamal and Chitra Gangadharan. Her father Kamal was a state-level footballer, while her mother Chitra played for Karnataka and also represented India women's national football team.

== Playing career ==
Amoolya represented India at the 2008 AFC Women's Asian Cup qualification and the 2012 Olympics Qualifiers. She was also a part of the national winning squads which played in the 2010 SAFF Women's Championship and 2010 South Asian Games. She was part of the team at the 2014 Asian Games.

In 2010, she won the Ekalavya Award, granted by the Government of Karnataka for outstanding performance in sports.

== Coaching career ==
Amoolya was appointed the head coach of the Karnataka women's team for the 2022–23 Senior Women's National Football Championship season.

== International goals ==
No.	Date	Venue	Opponent	Result	Competition
1.	13 December 2010	Cox's Bazar Stadium, Cox's Bazar, Bangladesh	Bhutan	18–0	2010 SAFF Women's Championship
2.	20 December 2010	Cox's Bazar Stadium, Cox's Bazar, Bangladesh	Pakistan	8–0	2010 SAFF Women's Championship

== Honours ==
India

- SAFF Championship: 2010
- South Asian Games Gold medal: 2010
