= Chitra Gangadharan =

Indian football coach and former footballer

Personal information
- Full name: Chitra Gangadharan
- Date of birth: 16 July 1957 (age 69)
- Place of birth: Bangalore, Karnataka, India
- Position: Goalkeeper

Senior career*
Years	Team	Apps	(Gls)
- Karnataka

International career
1980–1981	India	?	(0)

Managerial career
- 2019–2020: Bangalore United FC
- 2021–2022: Sirvodem SC
- * Club domestic league appearances and goals

Chitra Gangadharan (born 16 July 1957) is an Indian football coach and former footballer from Karnataka. She also captained the Indian team and was part of the All Stars Asian team in 1977–78. She played as a goalkeeper for the India women's national football team from 1975 to 1981.

== Personal life ==
She who hails from Gandhi Bazar in Bengaluru (then Bangalore) started as a cricket player, playing for Padma Socials as a wicketkeeper. She, however, shifted to football when the State started a women's football team. Mr Rajappa of the Football association called some of the cricket girls and they were coached by 1948 Olympian Raman. In 1990s, she used to play at the National College Ground in Basavanagudi. E Ramakrishna Rao, former India player and ITI coach, helped her to find a place to play football.

Chitra married Kamal, who is also a football player. Her daughter Amoolya Kamal was part of the Incheon Asian Games where Chitra was the goalkeeper coach.

== Career ==
She represented Karnataka in the Senior National Women's Football Tournament in 1975 at Lucknow.

In 1976 she played her first international. She joined the Indian camp on a trial basis but impressed the coach Sushil Battacharya and was selected as the first goalkeeper for the Thailand tour. In 1980-81 She did the SAI coaching course in 1981 and she got a Nivea scholarship of Rs.500, a big amount then. She became the first women's football coach in India. She played for Sahara India in the Women's league in the early eighties. She was also a class I referee with the KSFA after passing the AFC 'A' licence in 2007–08, along with Karen of Goa. In 1980, she was the captain of the Indian team that won the silver in the Asian Cup.

She coached the BUFC men's team and became the first woman in India to coach a men's team. From 1998, she was the goalkeeper coach of the Indian team with some breaks in between. Later, she coached the women's team of BUFC known as BUWFC. In 2011, she was the goalkeeper coach of the team which played three friendlies against Bahrain.
