= Bembem Devi Oinam =

Indian footballer

Bembem Devi
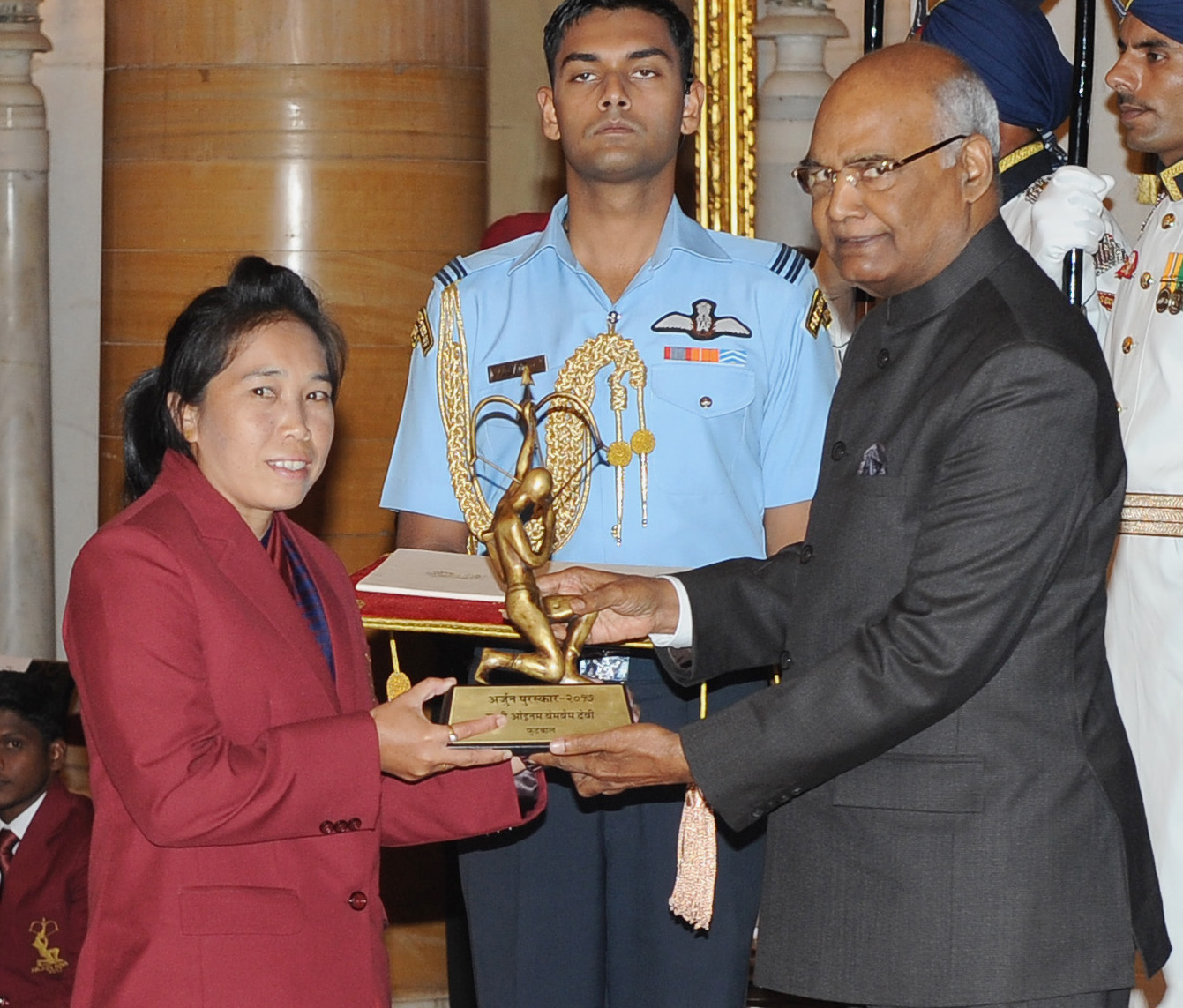
- The President, Ram Nath Kovind presenting the Arjuna Award to Bembem Devi, 29 August 2017.

Personal information
- Full name: Bembem Devi Oinam
- Date of birth: 4 April 1980 (age 46)
- Place of birth: Imphal, Manipur, India
- Height: 5 ft 2 in (1.57 m)
- Position: Midfielder

Senior career*
Years	Team	Apps	(Gls)
- Manipur
2014–2015	New Radiant	3	(6)
2016–2017	Eastern Sporting Union	9	(3)

International career
1995–2016	India	82	(18)

Managerial career
- 2016–2018: Eastern Sporting Union
- 2018: India Women U17 (assistant)
- 2019–: Manipur Police
- 2021–2022: Manipur Women
- 2022: India Women (assistant)
Medal record
Representing India
SAFF Women's Championship
Winner	2010 Bangladesh
Winner	2012 Sri Lanka
Winner	2014 Pakistan
South Asian Games
Gold medal – first place	2010 Bangladesh	Team
Gold medal – first place	2016 India	Team
- * Club domestic league appearances and goals

Bembem Devi Oinam (Meitei: Oinam Bembem Devi, born 4 April 1980) is an Indian football coach and former footballer from Manipur. In 2017, she was honoured with the Arjuna Award by the Ministry of Youth Affairs and Sports. She was nicknamed the Durga of Indian Football and is currently involved in spreading awareness about Women's football in India.

Oinam Bembem Devi is the recipient of India's highly prestigious award Padma Shri 2020.

== Early life and club career ==
Devi began her career as a footballer in 1988 when she began training at the United Pioneers Club in Imphal. In 1991, she was selected to represent the Manipur U-13 team in the sub-junior football tournament. Her performances in the tournament seeham was signed up by Yawa Singjamei Leishangthem Lekai club, and two years later, by the Social Union Nascent (SUN) Club.

At the national level, Devi is a regular member of the Manipur state football team for woman since the year 1993. She has been appointed the captain of her state team since the 32nd National Games held in Hyderabad, where she led her state to victory.

In the match against defending champions Sun hotels and resorts, Bembem scored in both halves to help New Radiant WSC to a comfortable 4–0 win, securing them a spot in the semi-finals against Sun Hotels and Resorts. In the semi-finals, they defeated Sun hotels and resorts 5–1 and entered the final. The Final match was held on 21 June 2014 between New Radiant SC and Maldives National Defence Force. Bembem Devi scored in 9th and 26th minute of the match, to help New Radiant WSC achieve a historic 5–1 win over MNDF to win the league.

Bembem Devi ended up as the top scorer of the tournament with 6 goals in just 3 matches. She also provided 4 assists and she was awarded the Player of The Tournament for her excellent performances.

== International career ==
At the age of 15, Bembem made her international debut against Guam in the Asian Women's Championships.

The turning point in her career came at the 1996 Asian Games, where the Indian national team were drawn in a group alongside Japan and neighbours Nepal. They lost to Japan 1-0 and won against Nepal 1–0 to progress from the group with Japan. In round 2 they would be drawn in a tough group alongside the national teams of Uzbekistan, Turkmenistan and North Korea. They lost all their matches but by then Oinam Bemben Devi had announced her arrival at the national stage.

Before the 1997 AFC Cup in China, the Indian eve's team were sent to Germany for a month-long camp, where the national team players were trained by German coaches and played against German oppositions. The camp proved vital as the Indian team won 3–0 against Hong-Kong, Japan the top ranked team in women’ s football, defeated India 1-0 and in their final group game encounter India thrashed Guam 10–0.

She was given the armband of the Indian contingent in the AFC qualifying competition, held in Thailand in 2003. She was the captain of the Indian team that emerged winners at the 11th South Asian Games held in Bangladesh, in 2010 and the 2012 SAFF Women's Championship held in Sri Lanka in the year 2012.

She played her last game on 15 February against Nepal, at the 12th South Asian Games in Shillong. She finished her international career with 82 caps.

== Career statistics ==
As of 15 February 2016

Appearances and Goals by year
Years	Caps	Goals
1995–2007		
2010	10	4
2011	6	1
2012	5	5
2013	3	0
2014	2	2
2015	2	0
2016	5	0
Total	33	12

== As manager ==
Devi was appointed as manager of Eastern Sporting Union in 2017 Indian Women's League final rounds. She also became the first manager of Indian Women's League history to claim the tournament title also as a player. In 2018, she was assigned as the assistant coach for the India U17 women's team.

In the 2018–19 Indian Women's League season, she managed Manipur Police Sports Club.

== Honours ==
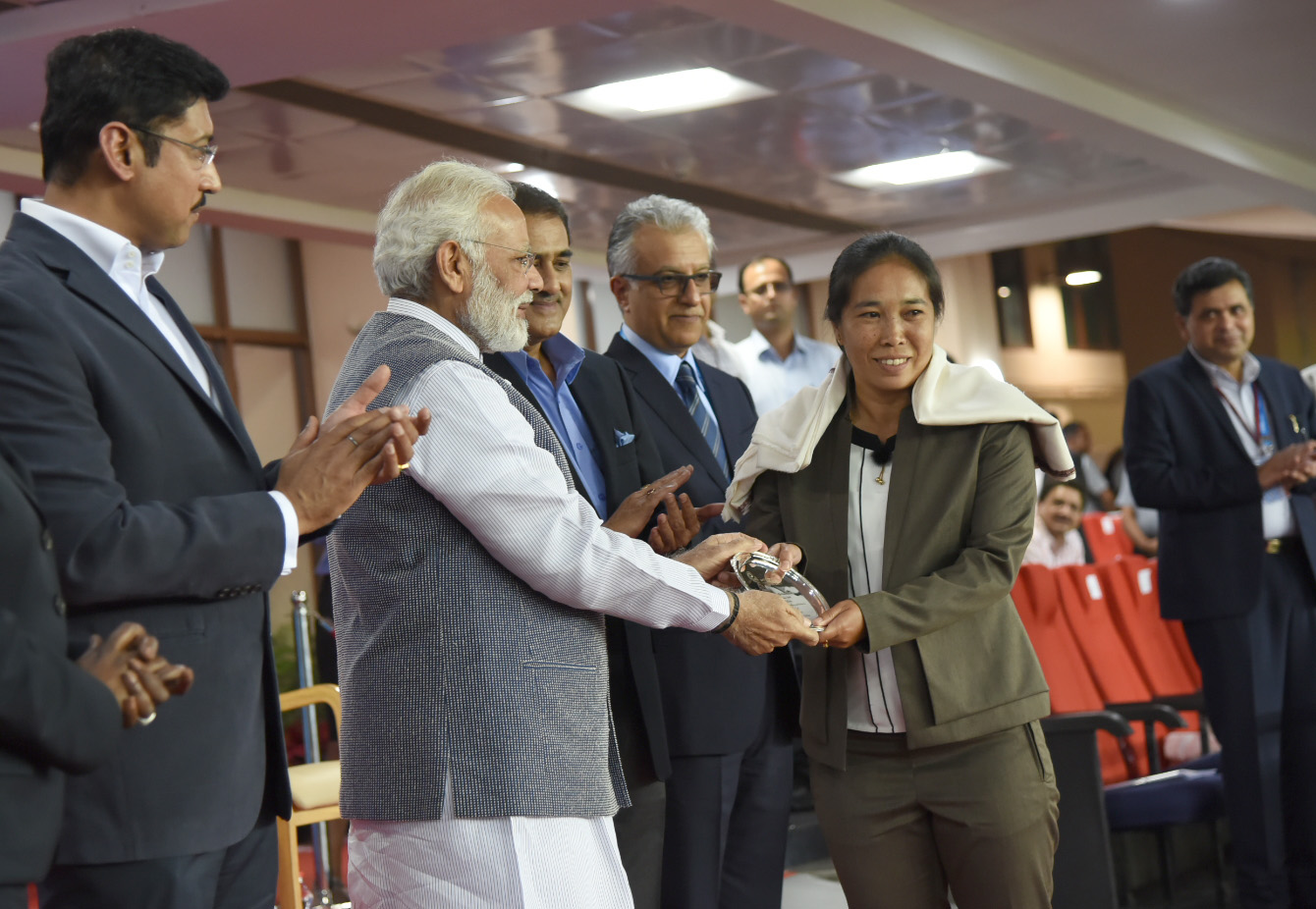
Bembem Devi being felicitated by the Prime Minister Narendra Modi at the inauguration of 2017 FIFA U-17 World Cup in New Delhi.

=== Player ===
India

- South Asian Games Gold medal: 2010, 2016
- SAFF Women's Championship: 2010, 2012, 2014

Eastern Sporting Union

- Indian Women's League: 2016–17

Manipur

- Rajmata Jijabai Trophy: 2013–14

New Radiant WSC

- FAM Women's Football Championship: 2014, 2015

=== Manager ===
Eastern Sporting Union

- Indian Women's League: 2016–17

Manipur

- Rajmata Jijabai Trophy: 2021–22

=== Individual ===
- FAM Premier League Player of the Tournament: 2014–15
- AIFF Women's Player of the Year (2): 2001, 2013
- Arjuna Award: 2017
- Padma Shri: 2020

== See also ==
- List of Indian football players in foreign leagues

== Bibliography ==
- Kapadia, Novy (2017). Barefoot to Boots: The Many Lives of Indian Football. Penguin Random House. ISBN 978-0-143-42641-7.
- Dineo, Paul; Mills, James (2001). Soccer in South Asia: Empire, Nation, Diaspora. London, United Kingdom: Frank Cass Publishers. p. 33. ISBN 978-0-7146-8170-2. Archived from the original on 25 July 2022.
- Martinez, Dolores; Mukharji, Projit B (2009). Football: From England to the World: The Many Lives of Indian Football. Routledge. ISBN 978-1-138-88353-6. Archived from the original on 2 July 2022.
- "Royal Wahingdoh girls meet their role models". the-aiff.com. New Delhi: All India Football Federation. 11 February 2016. Archived from the original on 1 January 2024.
