= Tababi Devi Thongam =

Indian footballer

Tababi Devi
Personal information
- Full name: Tababi Devi Thongam
- Date of birth: 1 September 1977 (age 49)
- Place of birth: Manipur, India
- Position: Forward

Senior career*
Years	Team	Apps	(Gls)
- Manipur

International career^{‡}
1995–2011	India	?	(19)
- * Club domestic league appearances and goals ‡ National team caps and goals as of 23 March 2012

Tababi Devi Thongam (Meitei: Thongam Tababi Devi, born 1 September 1977) is an Indian footballer who plays as a forward. She has been a member of the India women's national team.

== International career ==
She made her international debut at the 1995 AFC Women's Championship. Devi capped for India at senior level during the 2012 AFC Women's Olympic Qualifying Tournament.

== International goals ==
Scores and results list India's goal tally first

No.	Date	Venue	Opponent	Score	Result	Competition
1.	5 December 1997	Guangdong, China	Hong Kong	1–0	3–0	1997 AFC Women's Championship
2.	9 December 1997	Guangdong, China	Guam	?–0	10–0	1997 AFC Women's Championship
3.	9 December 1997	Guangdong, China	Guam	?–0	10–0	1997 AFC Women's Championship
4.	9 December 1998	Thammasat Stadium, Pathum Thani, Thailand	Chinese Taipei	?–?	1–13	1998 Asian Games
5.	9 November 1999	Iloilo Sports Complex, Iloilo City, Philippines	Malaysia	?–0	3–0	1999 AFC Women's Championship
6.	9 November 1999	Iloilo Sports Complex, Iloilo City, Philippines	Malaysia	?–0	3–0	1999 AFC Women's Championship
7.	9 June 2003	Nakhon Sawan Stadium, Nakhon Sawan, Thailand	Uzbekistan	5–0	6–0	2003 AFC Women's Championship
8.	9 June 2003	Nakhon Sawan Stadium, Nakhon Sawan, Thailand	Uzbekistan	6–0	6–0	2003 AFC Women's Championship
9.	12 June 2005	Mỹ Đình National Stadium, Hanoi, Vietnam	Guam	5–0	10–0	2006 AFC Women's Asian Cup qualifiers
10.	12 June 2005	Mỹ Đình National Stadium, Hanoi, Vietnam	Guam	6–0	10–0	2006 AFC Women's Asian Cup qualifiers
11.	4 February 2010	Bangabandhu National Stadium, Dhaka, Bangladesh	Nepal	?–0	5–0	2010 South Asian Games
12.	4 February 2010	Bangabandhu National Stadium, Dhaka, Bangladesh	Nepal	?–0	5–0	2010 South Asian Games
13.	13 December 2010	Cox's Bazar Stadium, Bangladesh	Bhutan	?–0	18–0	2010 SAFF Women's Championship
14.	13 December 2010	Cox's Bazar Stadium, Bangladesh	Bhutan	?–0	18–0	2010 SAFF Women's Championship
15.	13 December 2010	Cox's Bazar Stadium, Bangladesh	Bhutan	?–0	18–0	2010 SAFF Women's Championship
16.	13 December 2010	Cox's Bazar Stadium, Bangladesh	Bhutan	?–0	18–0	2010 SAFF Women's Championship
17.	15 December 2010	Cox's Bazar Stadium, Bangladesh	Sri Lanka	5–0	7–0	2010 SAFF Women's Championship
18.	17 December 2010	Cox's Bazar Stadium, Bangladesh	Bangladesh	5–0	6–0	2010 SAFF Women's Championship
19.	22 March 2011	Bangabandhu National Stadium, Motijheel, Bangladesh	Uzbekistan	1–0	1–1	2012 AFC Women's Olympic Qualifying Tournament

== Other activities ==
On 2 September 2022, Devi was elected as a member of the technical committee of the All India Football Federation.

== Honours ==
India

- SAFF Women's Championship: 2010
- South Asian Games Gold medal: 2010

Manipur

- Rajmata Jijabai Trophy: 1999–00, 2000–01, 2008–09
