= 2015 FAM Women's Football Championship =

Tournament details
- Country: Maldives

Final positions
- Champions: New Radiant W.S.C. (2nd title)

Tournament statistics
- Top goal scorer(s): Bala Devi (25 goals)

Awards
- Best player: Bala Devi

The 2015 FAM Women's Football Championship, is the third season of the FAM Women's Football Championship. The competition will begin on 24 May 2015.

== Participation ==
The Football Association of Maldives announced the chances to participate in the 2015 Women's Championship on 15 April 2015. The due date to participate in the competition is 14:30 (UTC+05:00), 30 April 2015.
