= 2010 SAFF Women's Championship =

Bangladesh 2010

Tournament details
- Host country: Bangladesh
- Dates: 12–24 December
- Teams: 8 (from 1 confederation)
- Venue: 1 (in 1 host city)

Final positions
- Champions: India (1st title)
- Runners-up: Nepal

Tournament statistics
- Matches played: 15
- Goals scored: 94 (6.27 per match)
- Top scorer(s): (India) Sasmita Mallik (14 goals)
- Best player: (India) Bala Devi

In 2010, the first edition of the SAFF Women's Championship was held from 12 to 23 December 2010 in Bangladesh. It was organised by the South Asian Football Federation.

India won the title without conceding a goal.

Though held in the same year in Bangladesh, and also India winning over Nepal, the tournament is not to be confused with the women's football event for the 2010 South Asian Games.

== Fixtures and results ==
=== Group A ===
Team	Pld	W	D	L	GF	GA	GD	Pts
India	3	3	0	0	31	0	+31	9
Bangladesh	3	2	0	1	11	6	+5	6
Sri Lanka	3	0	1	2	1	10	−9	1
Bhutan	3	0	1	2	1	28	−27	1

13 December 2010
15:30 BST

India	18–0	Bhutan
Sasmita (7); Bala (5); Tababi (4); Pinky (1); Amoolya (1)	Report

Cox's Bazar Stadium, Cox's Bazar

13 December 2010
18:30 BST

Bangladesh	2–0	Sri Lanka
Suinu Pru 11'; Sabina 76'	Report

Cox's Bazar Stadium, Cox's Bazar

15 December 2010
11:30 BST

India	7–0	Sri Lanka
Bala 2'; Sasmita 18', 30', 45'; Pinky 51', 60'; Tababi 49'	Report

Cox's Bazar Stadium, Cox's Bazar

15 December 2010
15:30 BST

Bangladesh	9–0	Bhutan
Aungmraching 13', 16', 30'; Farhana Khatun 25', 80'; Sabina 34', 67'; Suinu Pru 41', 52'	Report

Cox's Bazar Stadium, Cox's Bazar

17 December 2010
10:30 BST

Bhutan	1–1	Sri Lanka

Cox's Bazar Stadium, Cox's Bazar

17 December 2010
15:30 BST

Bangladesh	0–6	India
		Yumnam 7', 18', 26'; Sasmita 23', 43'; Tababi 39'

Cox's Bazar Stadium, Cox's Bazar

=== Group B ===
Team	Pld	W	D	L	GF	GA	GD	Pts
Nepal	3	3	0	0	31	0	+31	9
Pakistan	3	2	0	1	5	13	−8	6
Maldives	3	0	1	2	3	10	−7	1
Afghanistan	3	0	1	2	2	18	−16	1

12 December 2010
11:30 BST

Nepal	6–0	Maldives

Cox's Bazar Stadium, Cox's Bazar

14 December 2010
1:30 BST

Nepal	13–0	Afghanistan

Cox's Bazar Stadium, Cox's Bazar

14 December 2010
16:30 BST

Pakistan	2–1	Maldives

Cox's Bazar Stadium, Cox's Bazar

16 December 2010
12:30 BST

Pakistan	3–0	Afghanistan

Cox's Bazar Stadium, Cox's Bazar

18 December 2010
10:30 BST

Maldives	2–2	Afghanistan

Cox's Bazar Stadium, Cox's Bazar

18 December 2010
12:30 BST

Nepal	12–0	Pakistan

Cox's Bazar Stadium, Cox's Bazar

== Knockout stage ==
Semi-finals
20 December — Cox's Bazar
India	8
Pakistan	0
21 December — Cox's Bazar
Bangladesh	0
Nepal	3

Final
23 December — Cox's Bazar
India	1
Nepal	0

=== Semi finals ===
20 December 2010
14:30 BST

India	8–0	Pakistan
Bala Devi 18', 31', 32'; Gayatri 26', 39'; Sasmita 33'; Amoolya 45'; Manpreet 88'	Report

Cox's Bazar Stadium, Cox's Bazar

21 December 2010
13:30 BST

Bangladesh	0–3	Nepal

Cox's Bazar Stadium, Cox's Bazar

== Final ==
23 December 2010
15:30 BST

India	1–0	Nepal
Sasmita 65'	Report

Cox's Bazar Stadium, Cox's Bazar
