= Football at the 2010 South Asian Games – Women's tournament =

2010 South Asian Games
Bangladesh 2010

Tournament details
- Host country: Bangladesh
- City: Dhaka
- Dates: 29 January – 8 February 2010
- Teams: 5 (from SAFF sub-confederations)

Final positions
- Champions: India (1st title)
- Runners-up: Nepal
- Third place: Bangladesh

The women's football tournament of the 2010 South Asian Games is the first ever edition of the tournament. India won gold medal with a 3–1 win over Nepal.

== Group stage ==
Pos	Team	Pld	W	D	L	GF	GA	GD	Pts	Qualification
1	India	4	4	0	0	26	1	+25	12	Advance to Final
2	Nepal	4	3	0	1	16	6	+10	9	Advance to Final
3	Bangladesh	4	2	0	2	3	8	−5	6	Bronze Medal
4	Pakistan	4	1	0	3	0	14	−14	3	
5	Sri Lanka	4	0	0	4	2	18	−16	0	

Source: RSSSF.com
Rules for classification: 1) points; 2) goal difference; 3) goals scored; 4) head-to-head result .

Matches

29 January 2010

India	8−1	Sri Lanka
Mandakini Devi 9', 56', 59'; Sasmita Mallik 45'; Kamala Devi 51'; Laishram Naobi Chanu 82', 83'; Pinky Bompal Magar 90'	Report	?

Bangabandhu National Stadium, Dhaka
29 January 2010

Bangladesh	0−1	Nepal
	Report

Bangabandhu National Stadium, Dhaka

31 January 2010

India	6−0	Pakistan
Sasmita Malik 7', 28'; Bembem Devi 10', 11', 17'; Laishram Naobi Chanu 90'	Report

Bangabandhu National Stadium, Dhaka
31 January

Bangladesh	2−0	Sri Lanka
Aungmraching Marma 7'; Suinu Pru Marma 89'	Report

Bangabandhu National Stadium, Dhaka

2 February 2010

Nepal	8−1	Sri Lanka

Bangabandhu National Stadium, Dhaka
2 February 2010

Bangladesh	1−0	Pakistan
Sabina Khatun 15'

Bangabandhu National Stadium, Dhaka

4 February 2010

Pakistan	w/o	Sri Lanka

Bangabandhu National Stadium, Dhaka
- [Sri Lanka dns, preferring to catch a return flight to Colombo]
4 February 2010

India	5−0	Nepal
Sasmita Mallik (?); Tababi Devi (?); Laishram Naobi Chanu (?)

Bangabandhu National Stadium, Dhaka

6 February 2010

Pakistan	0−7	Nepal
	Report	Anu Lama; Jamuna Gurung; Parmila Rai

Bangabandhu National Stadium, Dhaka
6 February 2010

Bangladesh	0−7	India
	Report	Laishram Naobi Chanu (?); Mandakini Devi (?); Kamala Devi (?); Geeta Rani Chanu (?)

Bangabandhu National Stadium, Dhaka

== Gold medal match ==
8 February 2010

India	3–1	Nepal
Laishram Naobi Chanu (?); Bembem Devi (?)		? (?)

Bangabandhu National Stadium, Dhaka
