= National Football Stadium (Maldives) =

Sports stadium in Malé, Maldives

Galolhu Football Stadium
- ގަލޮޅު ފުޓްބޯޅަ ދަނޑު (Gaumee Football Dhan'du)
- Galolhu Dhandu
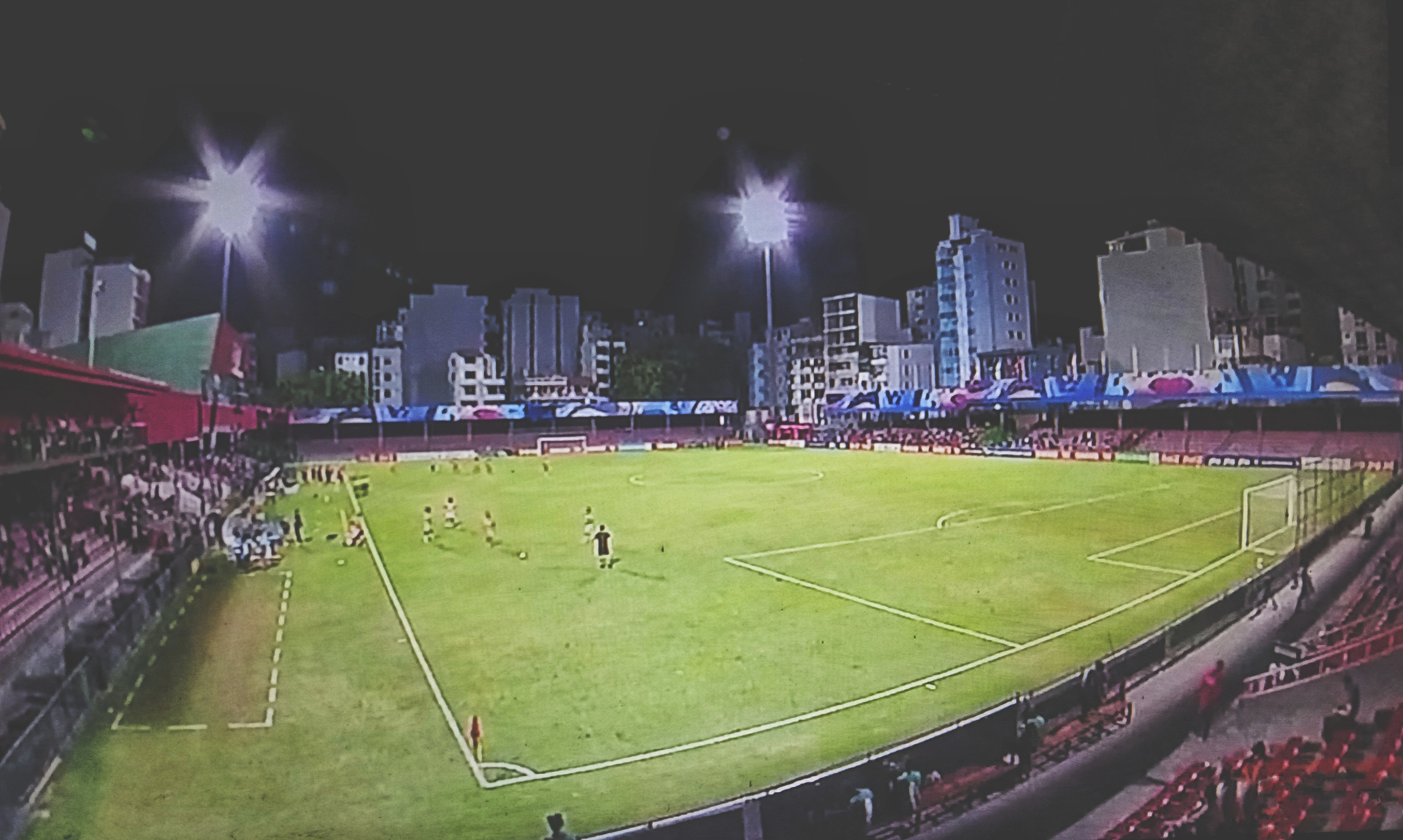
- The stadium on a matchday of the 2021 SAFF Championship
- Interactive map of Galolhu Football Stadium
- Full name: National Football Stadium
- Location: Majeedhee Magu, Malé, Maldives
- Coordinates: 4°10′26.7″N 73°30′47.1″E
- Operator: Football Association of Maldives
- Capacity: 11,850
- Surface: Grass

Construction
- Opened: 1979
- Renovated: 2014

Tenants
- Maldives national football team (1979–present) various clubs Maldives women's national football team

The National Football Stadium, also known as the Galolhu Rasmee Dhandu Stadium (Dhivehi: ގަލޮޅު ފުޓްބޯޅަ ދަނޑު), is a multi-purpose stadium in Malé, Maldives. It is used mostly for football matches of the Dhivehi Premier League, the Maldives FA Cup, the Maldivian FA Charity Shield, the President's Cup, the FAM Women's Football Championship, and national teams. The stadium holds over 11,000 spectators. The stadium was renovated for the 2014 AFC Challenge Cup, and rebranded as the National Football Stadium.

Football has long been popular in the Maldives, with sports clubs playing a key role in developing the game. Before 2010, important matches at the National Football Stadium regularly attracted thousands of spectators. Football clubs relied on ticket revenue, supplemented by government support, to fund their operations. However, in recent years, attendances have declined sharply. Many top-flight football league matches at the National Football Stadium are played with only dozens of spectators in attendance, while clubs are facing financial difficulties despite ongoing government grants.

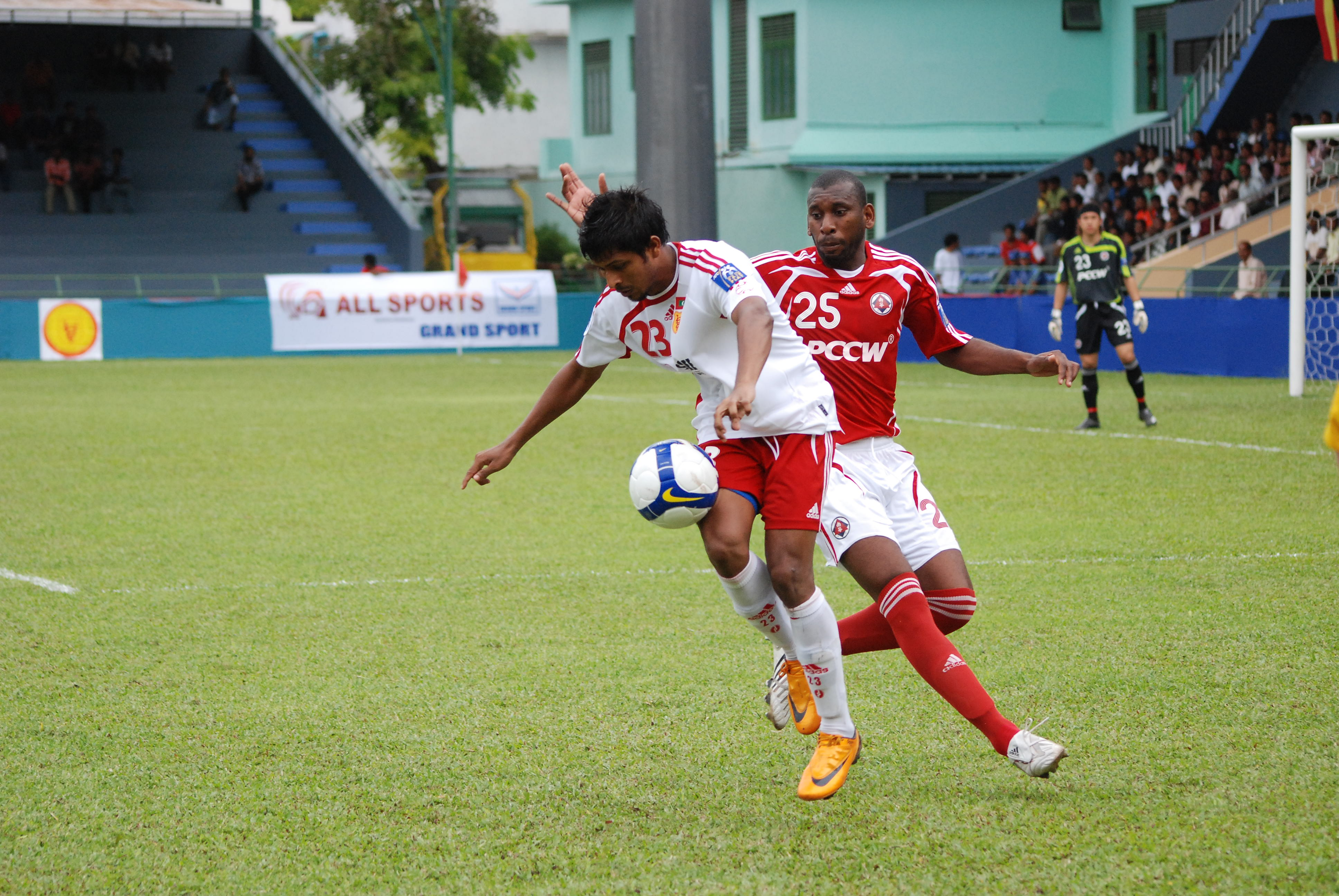
Victory SC player (in white) in action against South China AA during the 2008 AFC Cup match at the stadium

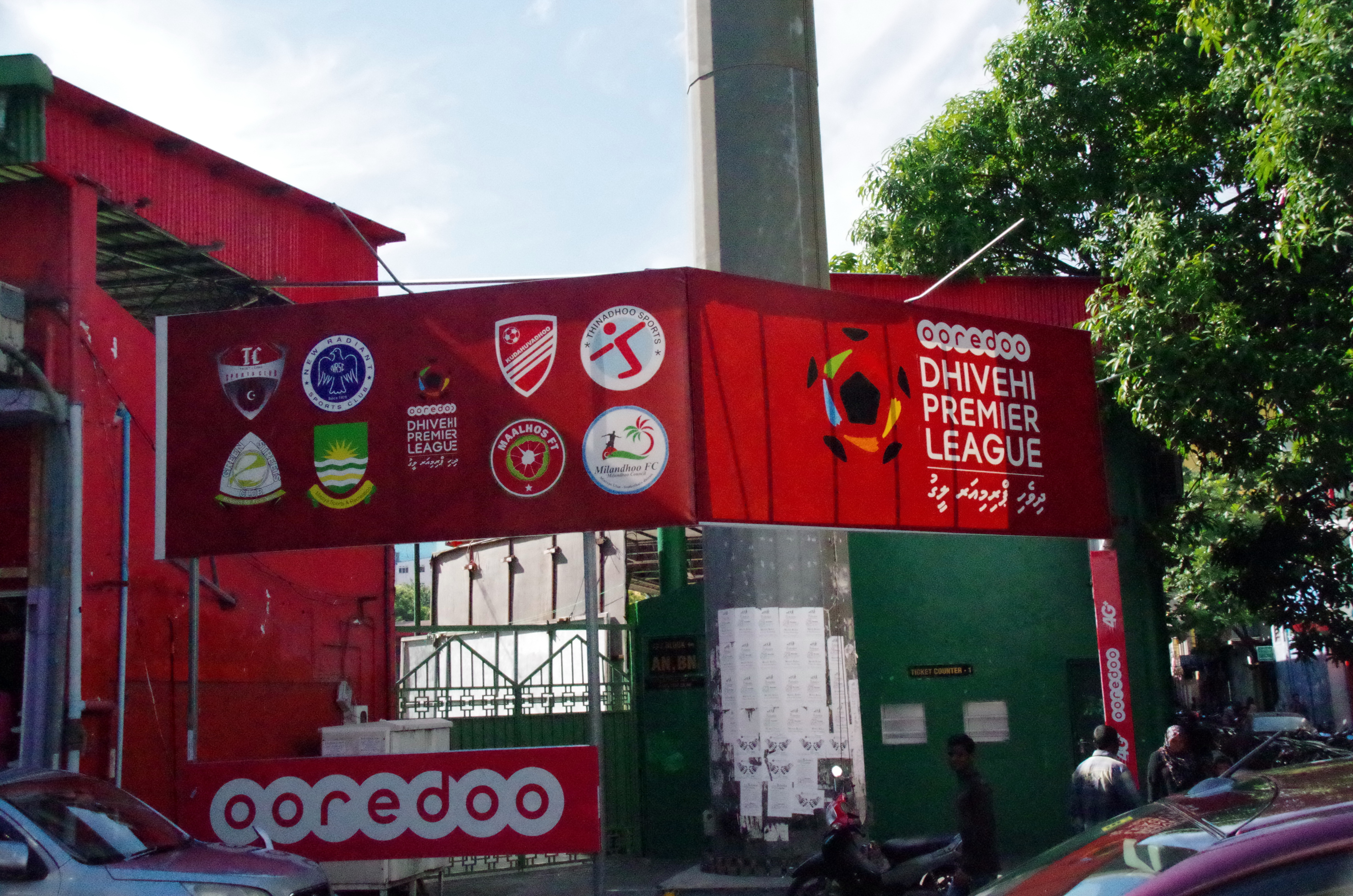
Exterior of the stadium on a matchday of the Dhivehi Premier League
