= FAM Women's Football Championship =

- Founded: 2012
- Abolished: 2015
- Region: Maldives
- Teams: Variable
- Last champions: New Radiant (2nd title)
- Most championships: New Radiant (2 titles)

The FAM Women's Football Championship was the Maldivian football competition for women, run by The Football Association of Maldives. In 2025, the FAM Women's League was started which became the full-fledged women's league in the Maldives.

== Champions ==
Season	Champions	Runners-up	Ref.
2012	Sun Hotels and Resorts	Maldives National Defence Force	
2014	New Radiant	Maldives National Defence Force	
2015	New Radiant	Maldives National Defence Force	

=== Winners table ===
Team	No. of titles
New Radiant	2
Sun Hotels and Resorts	1

== See also ==
- Maldives women's national football team
- Football in the Maldives
