= New Radiant W.S.C. =

New Radiant Women
- Full name: New Radiant Women's Football Club
- Nickname: Ladies in Blue
- Founded: 6 May 2014; 12 years ago
- Ground: National Football Stadium, Male, Maldives
- Capacity: 13,000
- Chairman: Ali Waheed
- Manager: Ahmed Niyaz
- League: FAM Women's League
- 2025 FAM Women's League: 4th
Home colours	Away colours

New Radiant Women's Football Club is a women's association football team playing in FAM Women's League.

== History ==
New Radiant took part in 2025 FAM Women's League where they finished 4th among total six teams. Their head coach was Ismail Anil and captained by Fadhuwa Zahir.
