= Naik (surname) =

Naik is an Indian surname.

Naik is a regional romanization of the Chinese surname Nie (聂 / 聶), commonly found among the Chinese diaspora in Malaysia and Singapore, particularly within dialect communities such as the Foochow (Hakka/Hokkien-adjacent) or Teochew groups.

Contextual Overview:

Chinese Character: 聂 (Simplified) / 聶 (Traditional)

Mandarin Pinyin: Niè

Regional/Dialect Spelling: Naik (predominantly Southeast Asian / Nanyang romanization)

Usage: Widely recognized across the Chinese Malaysian and Singaporean Chinese populations due to historic dialect-based birth registration practices before standard Pinyin became common.

== List of people with the name ==
=== A ===
- A. M. Naik (born 1942), chairman and managing director of Larsen & Toubro Limited
- Akhila Chandra Naik, Indian politician
- Ali Muhammad Naik (died 2017), Indian politician
- Amai Mahalinga Naik (born 1945), Indian farmer and inventor
- Anam Naik, Indian politician
- Anuradha N. Naik, Indian botanist
- Atisha Naik, Indian actress
- Ayaz Naik (born 1966), Pakistani actor
- Aziz Naik (1936–2014) was a Pakistani field hockey player

=== B ===
- B. T. Lalitha Naik (born 1945), Indian social activist
- Bahirji Naik, 17th century Maratha spy
- Balram Naik (born 1964), Indian politician
- Balu Naik, Indian politician

=== C ===
- Chethan Naik (born 1989), Indian playback singer
- Chitra Naik (1918–2010), Indian educationist, writer and social worker

=== D ===
- Daitari Naik, Indian agriculturalist
- Damu Naik (born 1971), Indian politician
- Datta Naik (1927–1987), Indian film music director
- Datta Damodar Naik (born 1954), Indian businessperson and writer
- Dattatraya Naik (1890–1968), Indian cricket umpire
- Dharanidhar Naik (1864–1914), tribal leader of Keonjhar
- Dharavath Ravinder Naik (born 1952), Indian politician

=== G ===
- G. Devaraya Naik (1947–2017), Indian politician
- G. Kumar Naik (born 1963), Indian politician
- Ganesh Naik (born 1950), Indian politician
- Gomaji Naik, 17th century warrior and military adviser in the army of Shivaji Maharaj
- Gourahari Naik (died 2020), Indian politician

=== H ===
- Hari Makaji Naik (died 1879), Indian freedom activist
- Hema Naik, Indian Konkani writer
- Hindurao Naik Nimbalkar (born 1948), Indian politician
- Hrushikesh Naik, Indian politician

=== I ===
- Indira Naik, Indian singer
- Indranil Naik, Indian politician

=== J ===
- Jagannath Naik, Indian politician
- Jalen Naik, Indian politician
- Jayant Pandurang Naik (1907–1981), Indian educator
- Jayanti Naik (born 1962), Indian Konkani writer
- Jigar Naik (born 1984), English cricketer
- Jogendra Naik (1947–2006), Indian politician

=== K ===
- K. Nemiraj Naik (born 1970), Indian politician
- K. R. Naik (born 1947), Indian industrial engineer
- Kashinath Naik (born 1983), Indian javelin thrower
- Kedar Naik (born 1979), Indian politician
- Kishore Chandra Naik (born 1973), Indian politician and former cricketer
- Kullal Chickappu Naik (1903–1973) Indian agriculture scientist
- Kuroji Naik, subedar of Maratha army

=== M ===
- Madhukar Krishna Naik (1926–2014), Indian scholar
- Madhura Naik (born 1984), Indian model and actress
- Mahadev Naik, Indian politician
- Maheswar Naik (1906–1986), Indian politician
- Mahind Naik, Indian cricketer
- Manasi Naik (born 1987), Indian actress
- Manava Naik, Indian actress
- Manohar Naik (born 1943), Indian politician
- Mansing Fattesingrao Naik, Indian politician
- Milind Naik, Indian politician
- Miransha Naik, Indian film director, producer and screenwriter
- Mohammed Amin Naik (born 1953), Indian Army officer
- Mohammad Khalil Naik, Kashmiri politician
- Murali Naik Bhukya (born 1966), Indian politician

=== N ===
- N. K. Naik (born 1944), Indian aerospace engineer
- Niaz Naik (1926–2009), Pakistani diplomat
- Nikhil Naik (born 1994), Indian cricketer
- Nilay Naik, Indian politician
- Nilesh Naik (1970–1995), Indian environmental activist
- Nitish Naik, Indian cardiologist

=== P ===
- P. T. Parameshwar Naik (born 1964), Indian politician
- Pandu Naik (1940–2016), Indian politician, businessperson and social worker
- Panna Naik (born 1933), Indian Gujarati language poet
- Pradeep Vasant Naik (born 1949), Indian Air Force member
- Pradipta Kumar Naik (born 1966), Indian politician
- Prakash Naik (born 1975), Indian politician
- Prashant Naik (born 1986), Indian cricketer
- Pratap Naik, Indian Jesuit priest
- Pundalik Naik (born 1952), Indian Konkani poet and writer

=== R ===
- R. B. Naik (1904–1970), Indian Politician
- Rafiq Ahmad Naik, Indian politician
- Ragya Naik (died 2011), Indian politician
- Raj Naik (born 1974), Indian cricketer
- Raja Amareshwara Naik (born 1957), Indian politician
- Raja Venkatappa Naik (1960–2024), Indian politician
- Raja Venugopal Naik (born 1982), Indian politician
- Rajan Naik, Indian politician
- Rajdeep Naik (born 1975), Indian actor and director
- Ram Naik (born 1934), Indian politician, governor of Uttar Pradesh
- Ramarao V. Naik (1909–1998), Indian classical singer
- Ramraje Naik Nimbalkar (born 1948), Indian politician
- Ranjit Naik (1933–2004), Indian architect and social worker
- Raqib Hameed Naik (born 1995), Kashmiri journalist
- Ravi Naik (1946–2025), Indian politician

=== S ===
- Sachin Naik (1978–2018), Indian painter and printmaker
- Sambhunath Naik, Indian politician
- Samir Naik (born 1979), Indian football player and coach
- Sandeep Naik (born 1978), Indian politician
- Shantaram Naik (1946–2018), Indian politician
- Shanti Narayan Naik, Indian politician
- Shashikanth Akkappa Naik (born 1960), Indian politician
- Shekhar Naik (born 1986), Indian blind cricketer
- Shirishkumar Surupsing Naik, Indian politician
- Shivanand Naik, (born 1962), Indian politician
- Shripad Yasso Naik (born 1952), Indian politician
- Shruti Naik, Indian-American scientist
- Sita Naik, Indian medical professional and educator
- Sitaram Naik, Indian politician and academic
- Subarna Naik, Indian politician
- Subhash Rajan Naik, Indian politician and businessman
- Subham Naik, Researcher in Social Science, Sambalpur University (Guest Faculty)
- Suchitra Naik (born 1955), Indian politician
- Sudhakarrao Naik (1934–2001), Indian politician
- Sudhir Naik (1945–2023), Indian cricketer
- Sulakshana Naik (born 1978), Indian cricketer
- Surendra Nath Naik (1937–2024), Indian politician
- Surupsingh Hirya Naik, Indian politician

=== U ===
- U. Rajesh Naik (born 1958), Indian politician
- Umaji Naik (1791–1832), Indian revolutionary
- Usha Naik, Indian actress

=== V ===
- Vaibhav Naik, Indian politician
- Vasantrao Naik (1913–1979), Indian politician
- Vihang A. Naik (born 1969), Indian poet

=== Z ===
- Zakir Naik (born 1965), Indian Islamic televangelist

== See also ==
- Naik (disambiguation)
- Nayak (disambiguation)
