= Raigad =

Raigad may refer to:

- Raigad district in Maharashtra, India
  - Raigad Fort
  - Raigad (Lok Sabha constituency) in Maharashtra, India
- Raigarh, district in Chhattisgarh, India
  - Raigarh (Lok Sabha constituency)
  - Raigarh (Vidhan Sabha constituency)
