= Miguel Braganza =

Indian horticulturist and organic farming advocate

Miguel Braganza, also known as Miguel de Braganza, is an Indian horticulturist, organic farming advocate, and conservationist. He specialises in promoting organic farming. He has served as the secretary of the Botanical society of Goa.

== Early life and education ==
Braganza resides in the town of Mapusa in North Goa. He pursued his bachelor's degree in Agriculture from the University of Agriculture Sciences in Bangalore, Karnataka. He further developed his practical skills in agriculture at the Zonal agricultural office in Bicholim, Goa. He learnt the methods of farming while he was involved in teaching the farmers how to utilise Rhizobium.

== Career and activism ==
Braganza worked with the Department of Agriculture, Government of Goa, for 15 years. He later stepped into the Non profit sector and served as an additional director of Organic Farming Association of India. Along with his team from Botanical society of Goa, he took initiative to organise the Konkan Fruit Fest which aims to preserve endangered food sources and to provide market to sell lesser known fruits.

He was a joint secretary of Western Ghats Kokum Foundation and is the editor of the resource book on Kokum published by the Foundation. He shares the traditional knowledge associated with local food produce and its cultural significance. He also studied the medicinal properties of the fruits like Kokum. He conceptualised the idea of having a plant and flower show and he received response from the nearby villagers and schools.

== Academic and community outreach ==
Braganza was involved in setting up Don Bosco Agricultural college in Sulcorna village located in Quepem taluka of Goa. It was the first institution to offer a degree program in Agriculture within Goa. Additionally, since 1992, he conducted home gardening workshops through Botanical Survey of India, for school students and Mahila Mandals across Goa.

== Publication ==
Braganza Miguel: Resource book on Kokum 2012.
