= Mapusa =

Mapusa Konkani: Mhapxe Portuguese: Mapuçá
- City
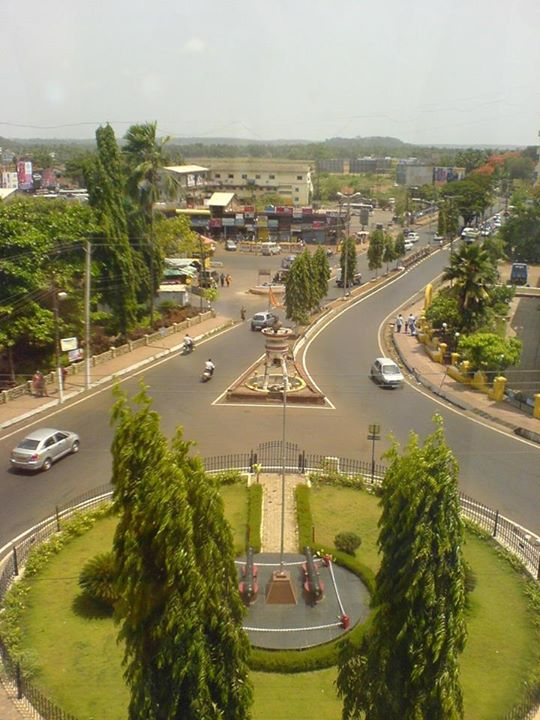
- A street in Mapusa, 2015

- Location in Goa, India Mapusa (India)
- Coordinates: 15.60°N 73.82°E
- Country: India
- State: Goa
- District: North Goa
- Taluka: Bardez
- Elevation: 15 m (49 ft)

Population (2001)
  - Total: 39,989
- Time zone: UTC+5:30 (IST)
- PIN: 403 507
- Telephone code: 0832
- Vehicle registration: GA-03
- Website: goa.gov.in

Mapusa (Goan Konkani: Mhapxem) is a city in North Goa, India. It is situated 13 km north of the state capital of Panaji. The city is the headquarters of Bardez taluka. During Portuguese India, the city was known as "Mapuçá".

== History ==
Mapusa is a small city clustered around the Mount (Alto). The name Mapusa is thought to be derived from the Konkani word for a 'measure' - 'map' and the phrase fill up - 'sa'. Ancient Goan agrarian community had a well established Gaunkari or Community Farming System, where villages formed associations, worked on community land and shared profits. Market day was a major event, with goods brought in from every district to one central area. Mapusa has thus remained a prominent market center for many centuries.

== Geography ==
Mapusa is located at 15.60°N 73.82°E. It has an average elevation of 15 metres (49 feet). It lies on the banks of Mapusa River. Mapusa has a tropical climate with temperatures ranging from a high of 37 °C in summer with high levels of humidity to a low of 21 °C in winters.

== Demographics ==
As of the 2011 Census of India, Mapusa had a population of 39,989. Males constitute 20,322 of the population and females 19,667. Mapusa has an average literacy rate of 76%, higher than the national average of 74.04%: male literacy is 80%, and female literacy is 73%. In Mapusa, 11% of the population is under 6 years of age.

== Government and politics ==
=== Civic administration ===
Mapusa is administered by the Mapusa Municipal Council. The city has 20 wards and the last municipal election was held in 2021. Councillor Nutan Bicholkar is currently the chairperson of the Mapusa Municipal Council (MMC).

=== Representation in Parliament and State Assembly ===
At a state level, Mapusa falls within the Mapusa (Goa Assembly constituency). As of 2022, its representative in the Goa Legislative Assembly is Joshua D'Souza of the Bharatiya Janata Party.

At a national level, the city is falls within the North Goa (Lok Sabha constituency). As of 2024, its Member of Parliament is Shripad Yesso Naik of the Bharatiya Janata Party.

== Economy ==
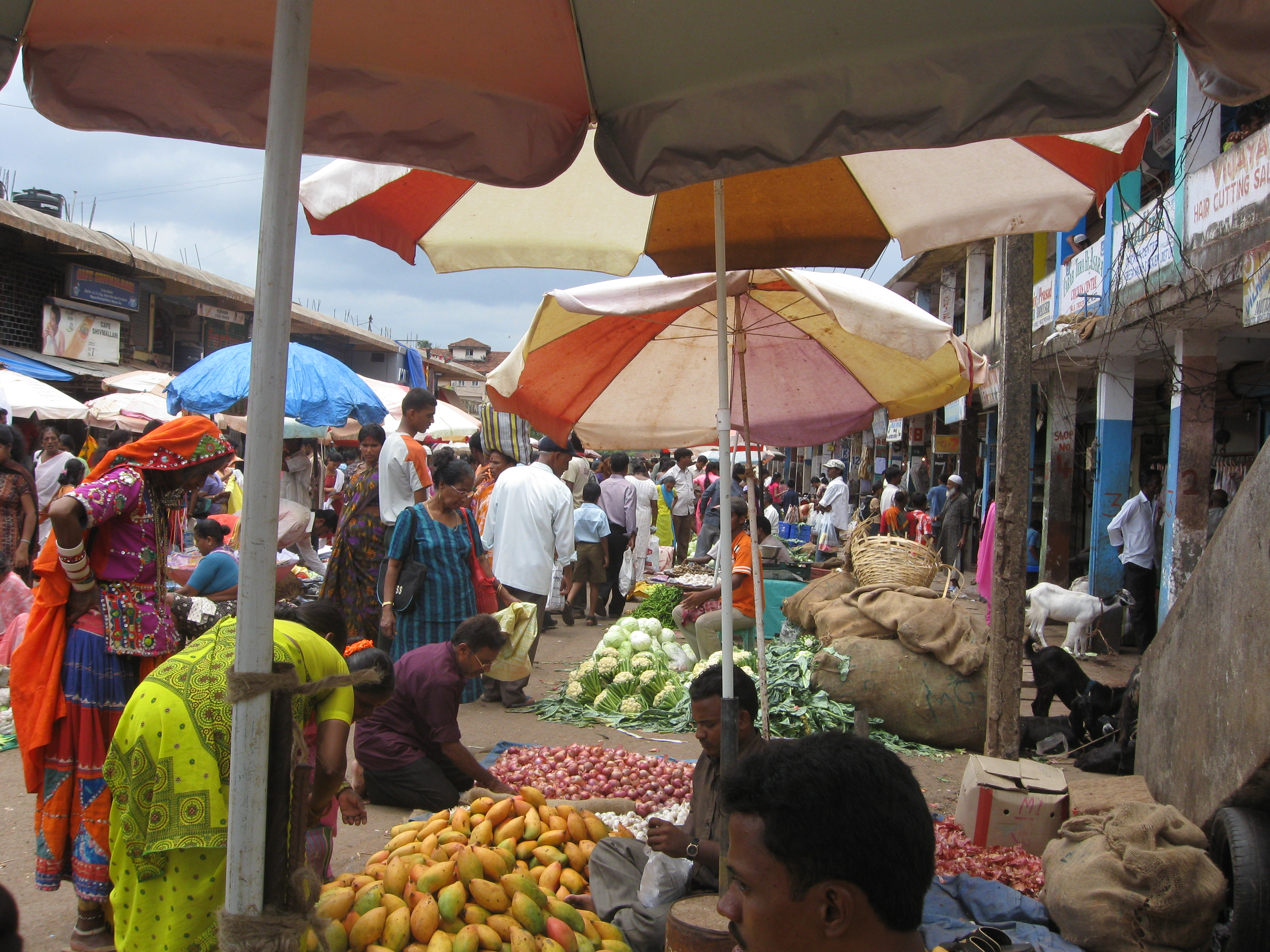
Mapusa vendor selling vegetables

Mapusa is close to one of the main centres of Goa's tourism industry. Mapusa's proximity to many beaches in the north of Goa makes it a suitable base during the tourist season (November to April). Because it is a mainly commercial city (for locals) with a large resident population, Mapusa has only a limited number of hotels and accommodation. Mapusa comes alive on Friday, the traditional market day also known as Mapusa Friday Market. People from surrounding villages and towns come to Mapusa to sell their wares. This fair has a lot of local flavour (unlike some other tourist-oriented fairs or markets) and specialises in agricultural produce, vegetables, locally grown fruit, spices, clothes and even plants (mainly during the monsoon planting season).

Every Friday, the Mapusa Market begins, with the majority of the space occupied by sellers, albeit leaving enough room for prospective buyers. The alleys between the regular stalls are then occupied with temporary mats and boards. From lottery tickets to barber shops, the bazaar caters for almost every requirement of the consumer. There is the fish street, where dried fish, as well as whole fresh fish from baby shark and squid to the bangda (mackerel) are sold. Fresh fruit and vegetables are gathered together and displayed, from sweet potatoes, pumpkins, and the local red brown Moira bananas, to the tiny fresh beans and other pulses.

== Education ==
As of November 2023, the Goa Board of Secondary and Higher Secondary Education recognised the following institutes in Mapusa.

=== Higher secondary schools ===
- St. Xavier's Higher Secondary School
- DMS PVS Sarojini Madhusudan Kushe Higher Secondary School
- Purushottom Walawalkar Higher Secondary School was established in 1988 and is run by the Saraswat Vidyalaya Society.
- Shree Ganesh Higher Secondary School

=== High schools ===
- New Goa's G. S. Amonkar vidya mandir
- Dattaram Mantravadi Memorial High School
- St. Mary's Convent High School
- St. Francis Xavier High School
- Janata High School
- Dyanprasarak Vidyalaya High School
- Saraswat Vidyalaya High School was established as a primary school in 1911 to give instruction in the Marathi language.
- St. Antony's High School
- Dr Babasaheb Ambedkar High School
- Shree Ganesh Vidya Mandir High School
- Divine Mercy Edgar Francisco High School
- Corner Stone High School
- St. Britto's High School

=== Higher education ===
As of November 2023, the following institutions, affiliated to Goa University, were recognised by the University Grants Commission (UGC).

- Saraswat Vidayala's Sridara Cawlo College of Commerce and management studies
- St. Xavier's College of Art, Science and Commerce

== Landmarks ==
Mapusa, however, does not have too many tourist sites. There are a few colonial era Municipal buildings on the Altinho hill, but it is a fairly small city with mostly modern buildings spread around the slopes of Altinho.

The most famous local shrine is Shree Dev Bodgeshwar Sansthan of Lord Bodgeshwar, located on the outskirts of the city in the middle of some rice fields, which is beautifully lit up at night and draw thousands of devotees for its annual Jatra.

The St. Jerome Church, founded in 1594 and rebuilt several times since, is famous for the annual feast of Our Lady of Miracles.

The Mapusa Market gathers Goan traders as well as merchants from adjacent states for goods such as spices, toddy and home-grown goods. For example, there are four varieties of locally grown bananas sold in this market and other varieties imported from Karnataka. There is also a part of the market where the traders specialize in repairing utensils such as blenders and food mixers for the preparation of spices.

Duler Stadium is an association football stadium located in Mapusa. The 10,000 seater stadium has Astroturf surface. Goa Professional League and Santosh Trophy games are held here.

== Gallery ==
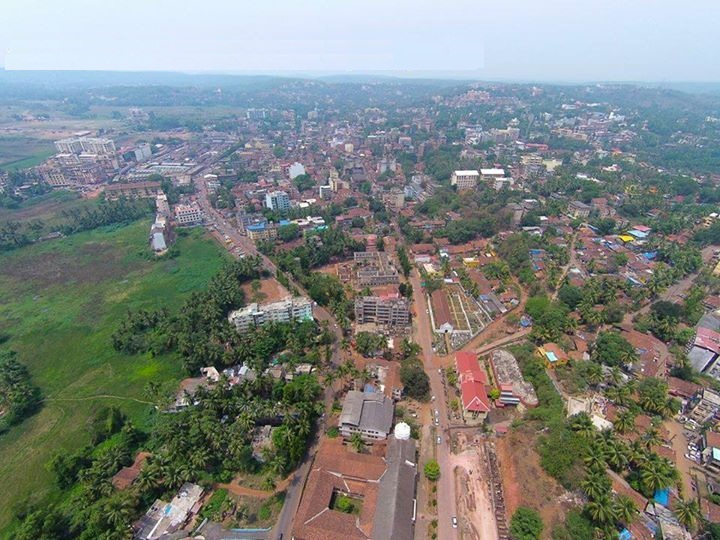
Aerial View Of Mapusa, Goa

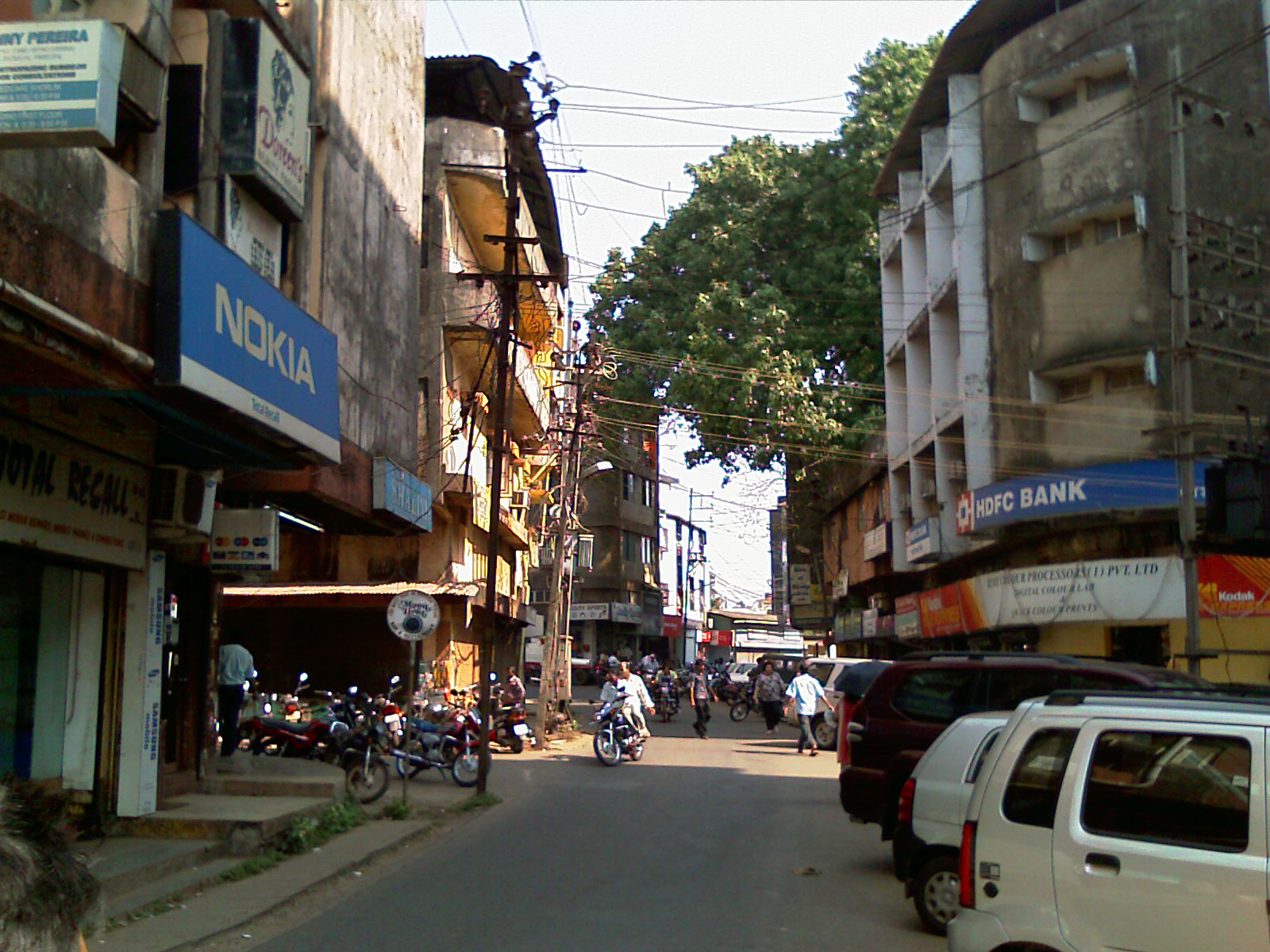
A street in Mapusa

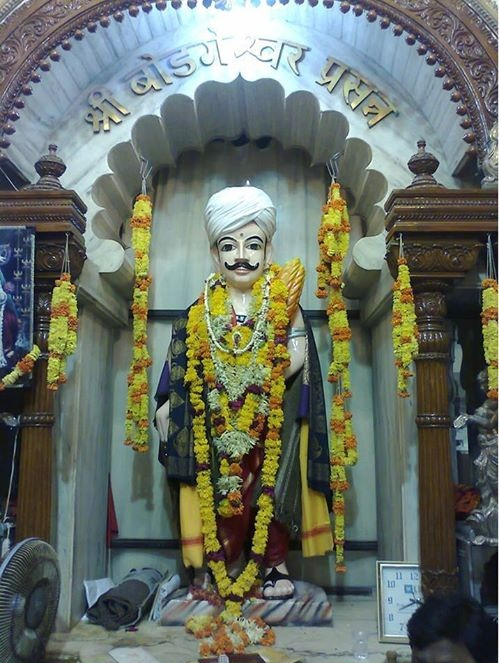
Shree Dev Bodgeshwer

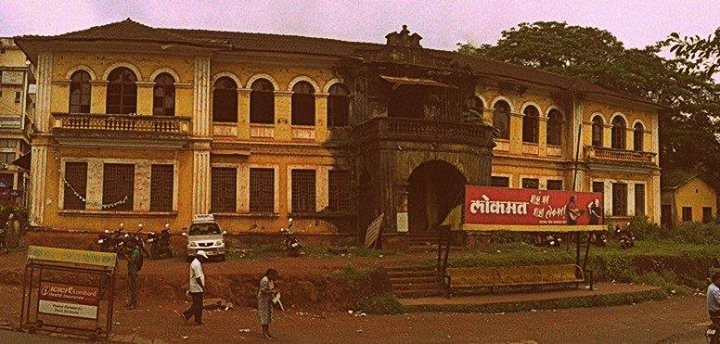
Portuguese Colonial Era Municipal Building Mapusa

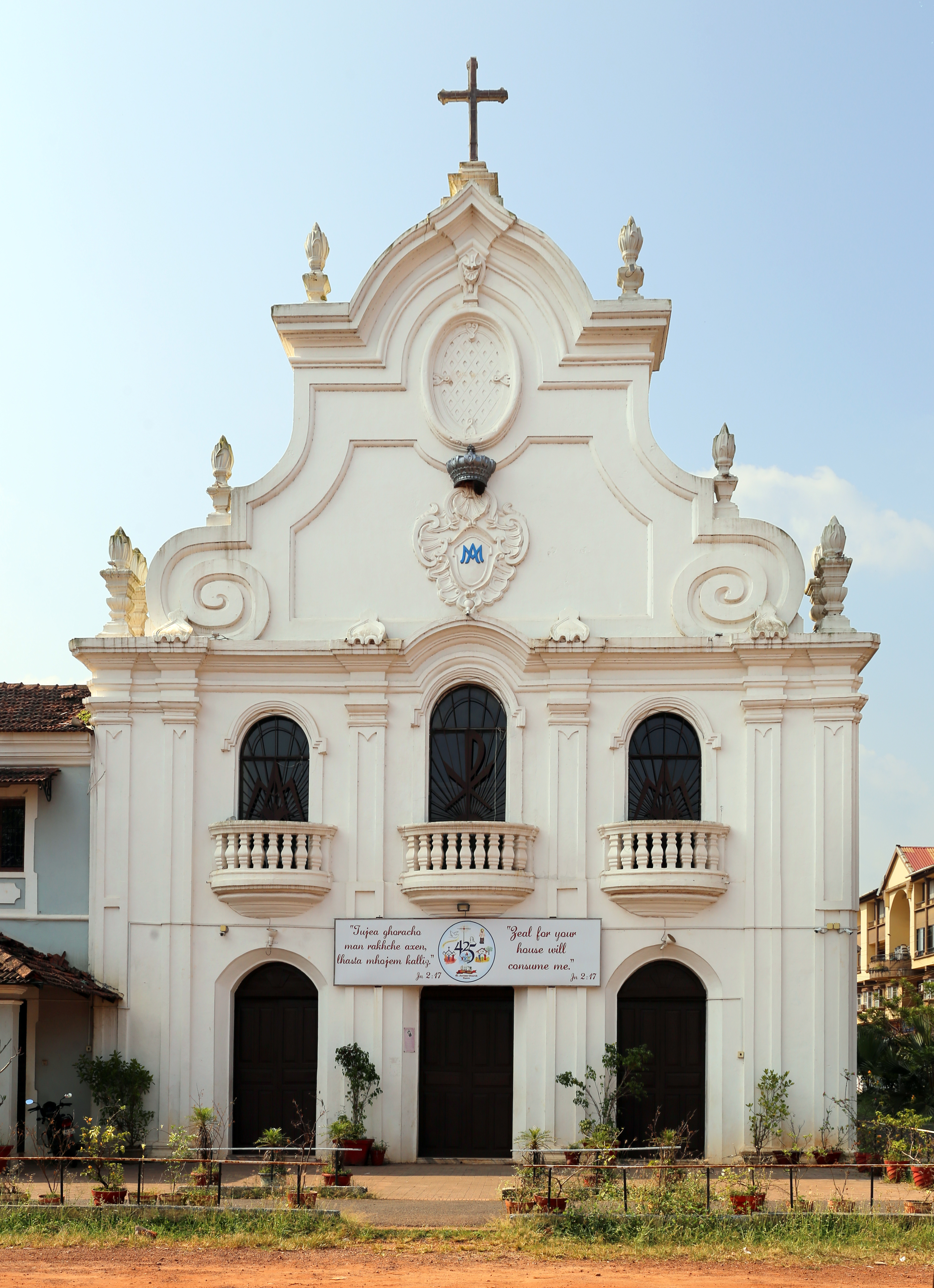
St. Jerome Church, Mapusa

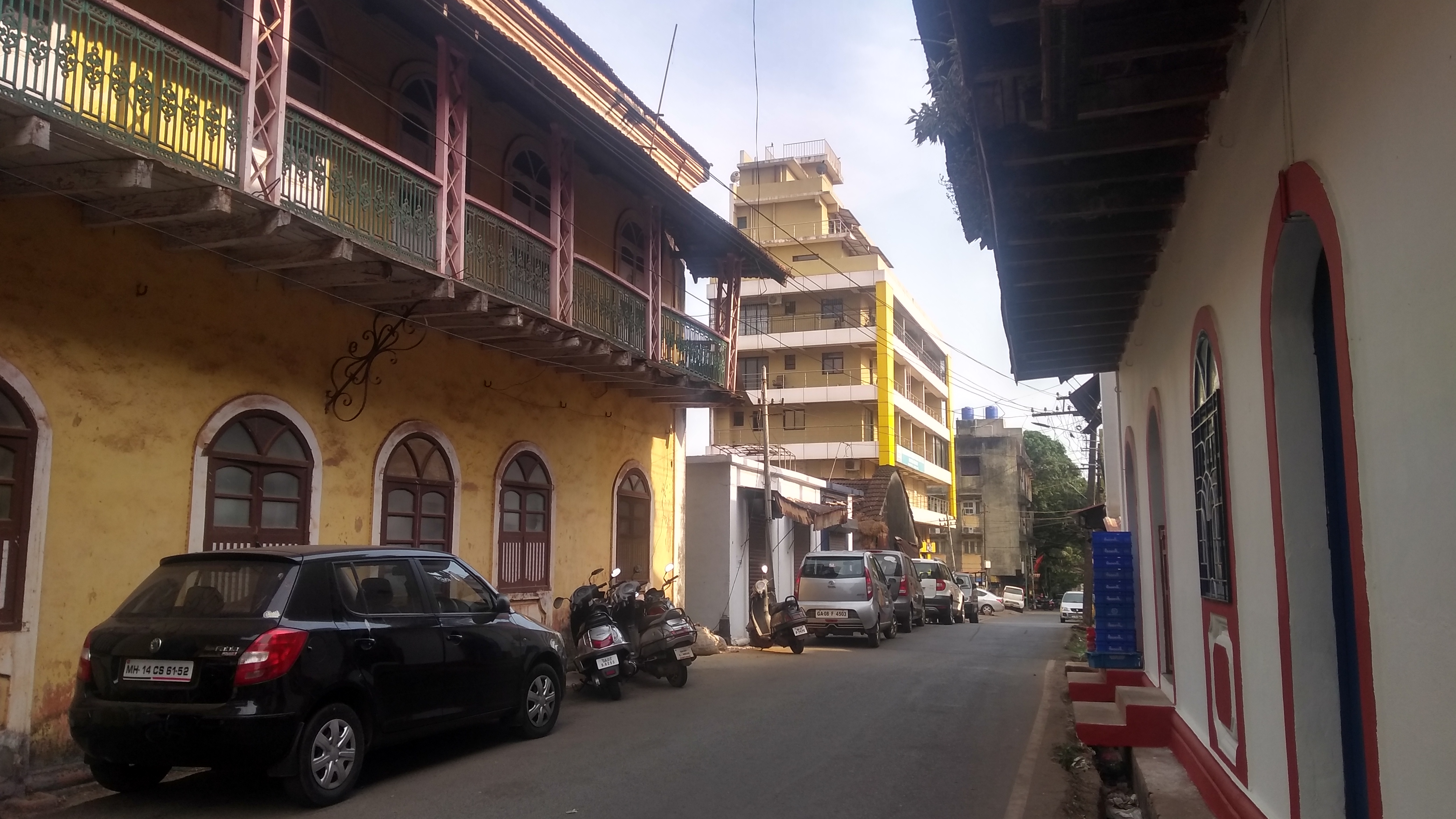
Downtown Mapusa, India

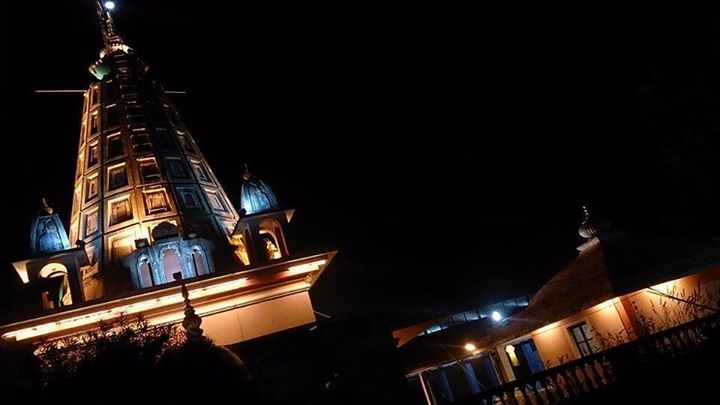
Verla-Canca Saibaba Temple located outside Mapusa, Goa

== Notable people ==
- Manohar Parrikar, Chief Minister of Goa, Former Minister of Defence of India
- Dayanand Bandodkar, 1st Chief Minister of Goa
- Filipe Neri Ferrão , Cardinal Archbishop of Goa, Daman and Diu, First Cardinal from Goa
- Francis Dsouza, Deputy Chief Ministers of Goa
- Raj Naik, first-class cricketer
- Myron Fernandes, professional footballer
- Ramdas Kamat, Classical Singer, Performed in Marathi Sangeet Natak and theatre.
- Surendra Sirsat, educationist and former Speaker of the Goa Legislative Assembly.
- Ramakant Khalap, lawyer, politician, former Law Minister of India.
- Saurabh Bandekar, cricketer, coach and scout
- Miguel Braganza, horticulturist and organic farming advocate
- Rameez Shaikh, filmmaker, actor and writer from Mapusa referred to as the "Father of Gen Z Goan Film Movement"
- Asmi Banaulikar, food blogger and content creator from Mapusa
