= Mapusa Municipal Market =

Coordinates: 15.588°N 73.813°E

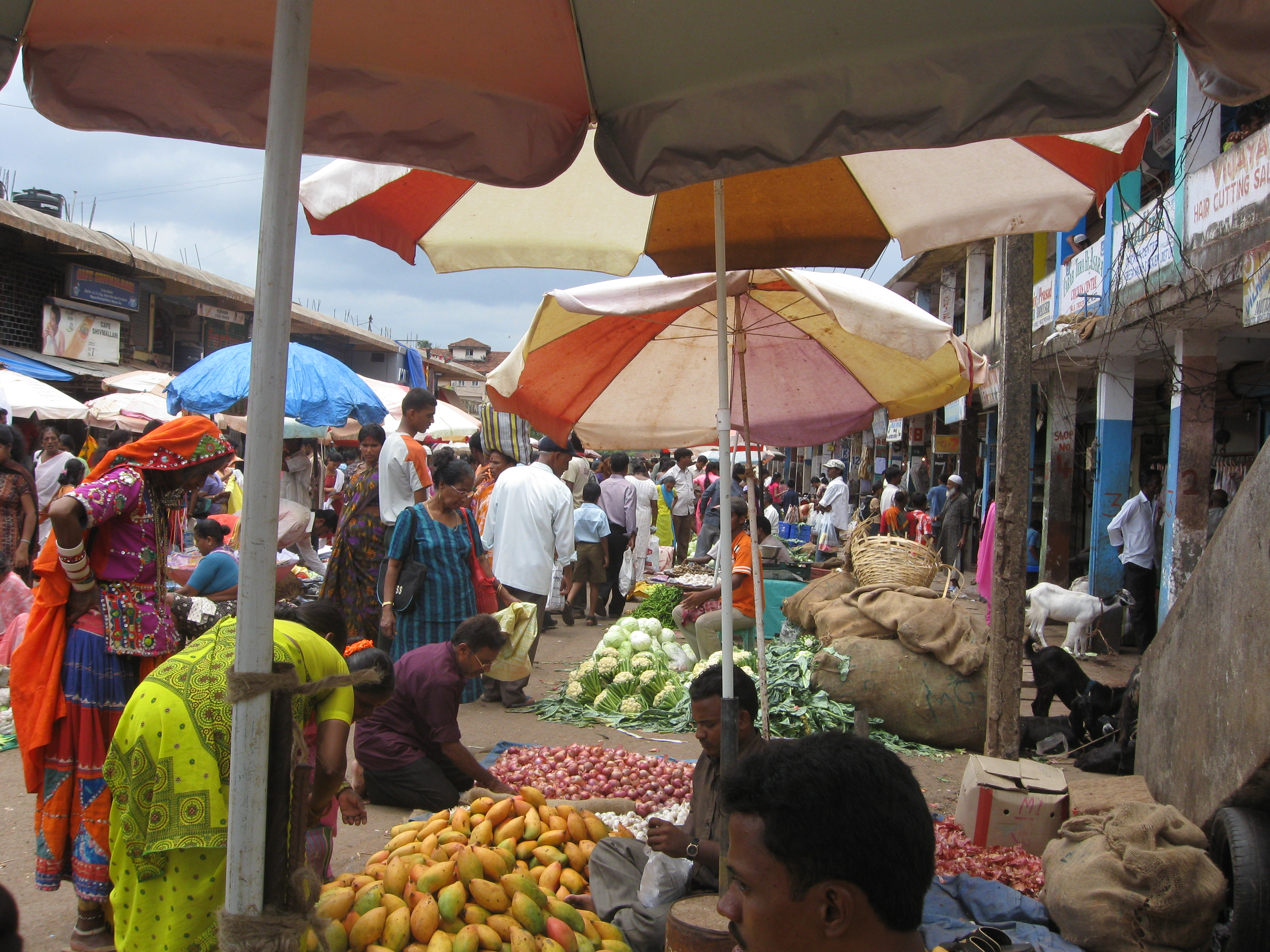
Vegetables on sale at Mapusa Municipal Market in Goa

Mapusa Municipal Market (also known as Mapusa Market and Mapusa Friday Market) is a traditional market in Mapusa, North Goa and a major tourist attraction. It was built in 1960, the first planned market in Goa. The market has 5 blocks along with many stalls with 1000 shops, some of which have been sub-divided, so bringing the total to 1060+ . It is open every day and is particularly world famous for Friday Market.

== The trade ==
Goan vendors come in from the surrounding villages to sell their locally grown or manufactured wares, such as spices, fruits, jewellery, pottery, chickens, incense and carpets. Many of the stalls in the bazaar are grouped by type of goods, with special areas for straw hats, Goan home-made chouriço and the like. Strings of Goan chouriço, spiced and marinated pork sausages, seedless tamarind, or amot are also traded.

== Gallery ==
Mapusa Market

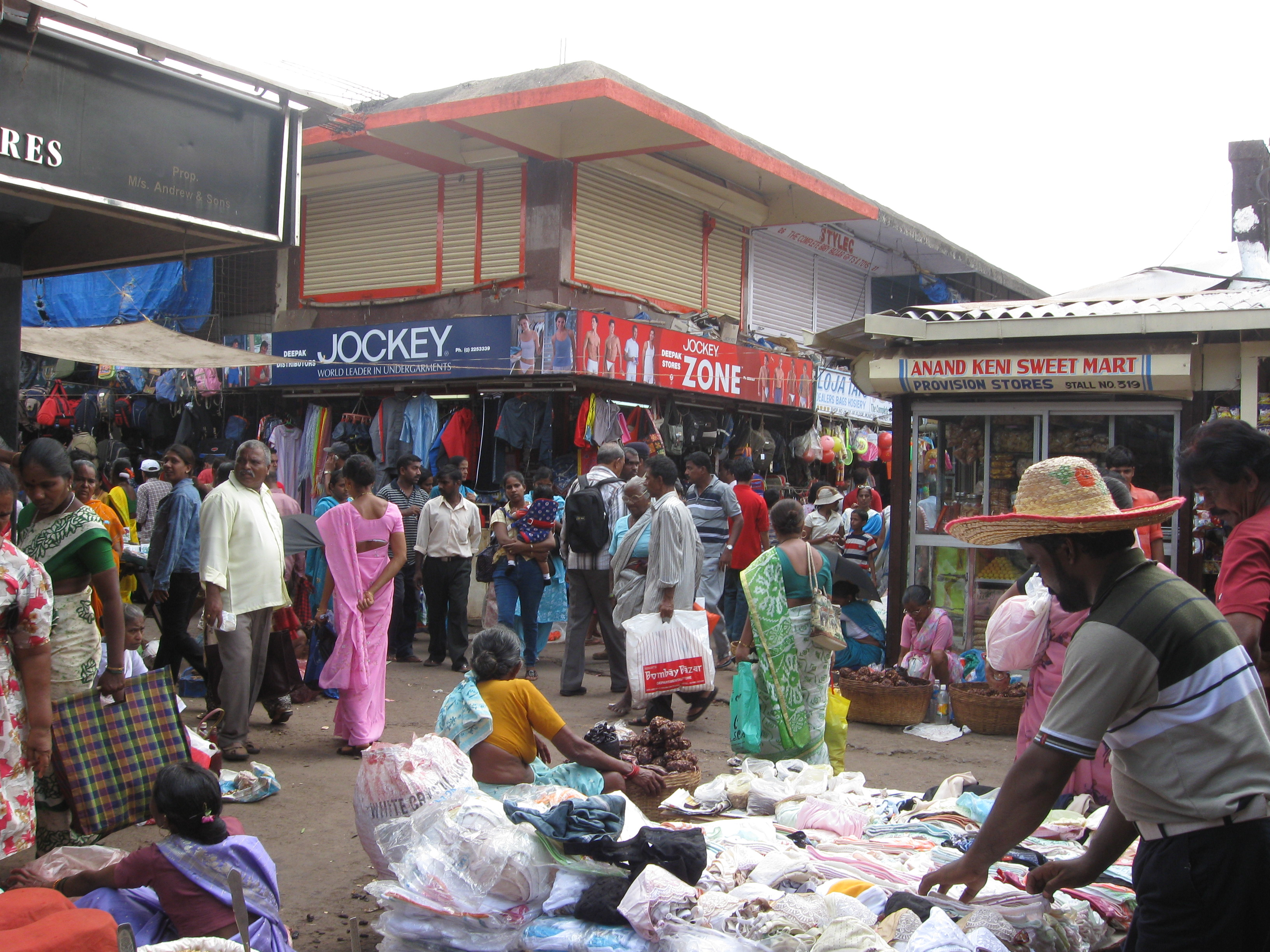
The huge crowds

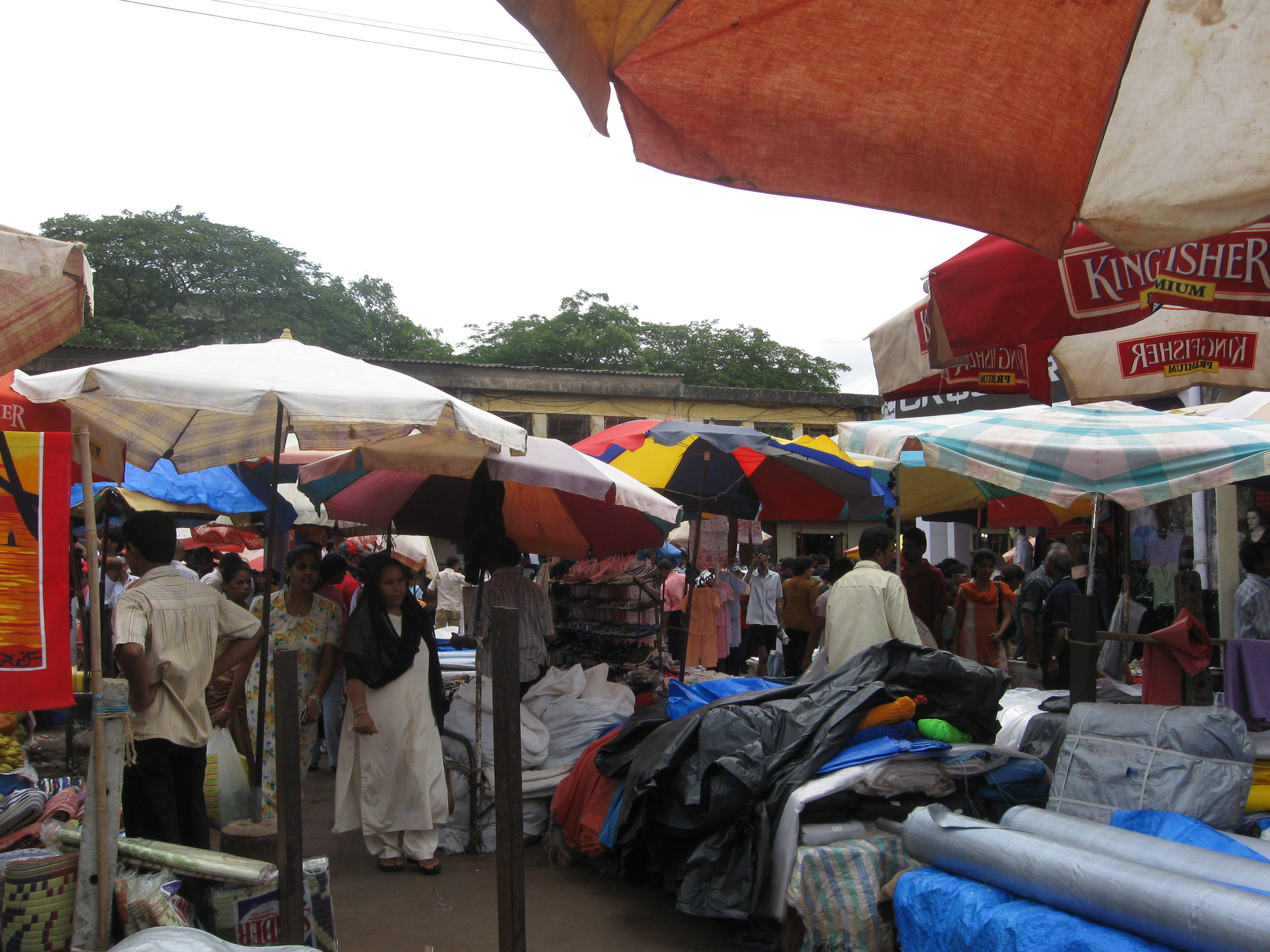
Cloth and other material on sale

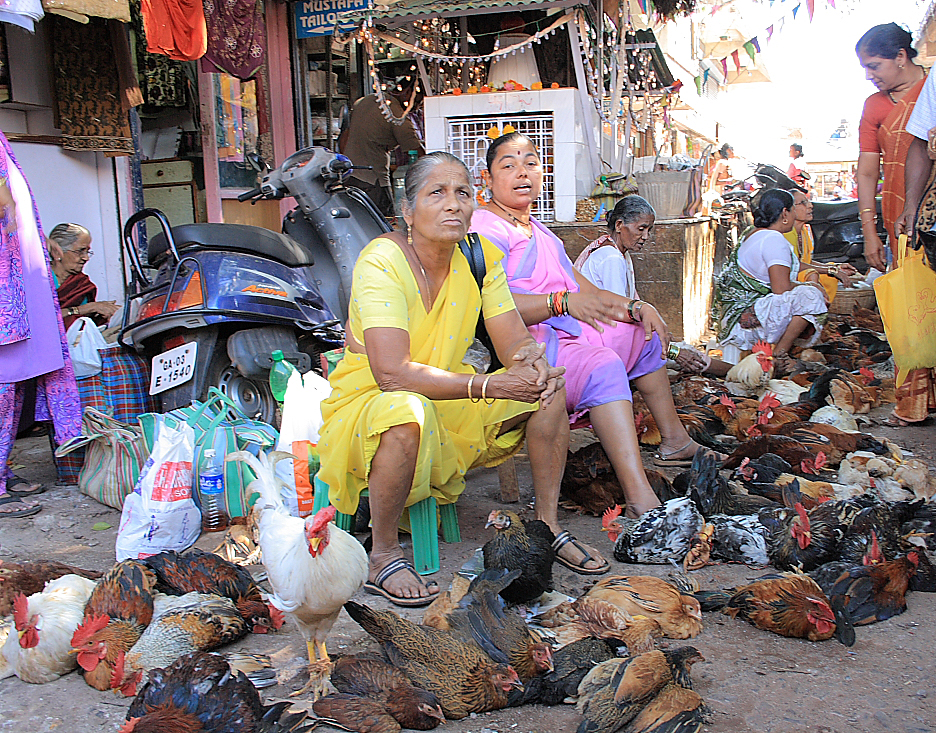
Chicken sellers
