= St. Jerome Church (Mapusa) =

Coordinates: 15°35′22.6″N 73°49′05.9″E

- St. Jerome Church
- St. Jerome Church
- Country: India
- Denomination: Roman Catholic
- Website: stjeromechurchmapusa.com

History
- Status: Active
- Founded: 1594; 432 years ago
- Founder: Fr. Jeronimo do Espirito Santo

Architecture
- Architectural type: Baroque architecture

St. Jerome Church is a parish of the Catholic Church in Mapusa, Goa, India, in the Archdiocese of Goa and Daman. It is dedicated to the Church Father St. Jerome. The church also holds the shrine of Our Lady of Miracles and the feast day of Miracles is thronged by thousands of devotees every year.

== History ==
The community was founded in 1594 by a Franciscan priest, Fr. Jeronimo do Espirito Santo, and the parish church constructed the same year. The church was expanded in 1674 to accommodate increased number of parishioners. The church was partly destroyed in an accidental fire 27 April 1838, with repairs completed in 1839. During "Operation Vijay" entire roof of the Church was damaged.

== Architecture ==
The church represents an exquisite Baroque style. It has three storeys, with three doors and three windows with round balustrade balconies on each storey. At the rear of the church is a dome with the bell tower. The roof is made of wooden planks. The church has three altars.

The church is famous for its annual Milagr Saibinnichem Fest.
