= Saraswat Vidyalaya =

- Location in Goa, India Saraswat Vidyalaya (India)
- Coordinates: 15.5953481°N 73.8054341°E
- Country: India
- State: Goa
- District: North Goa
- 1911: 2 March
- Elevation: 15 m (49 ft)
- Time zone: UTC+5:30 (IST)
- PIN: 403 507
- Telephone code: 0832

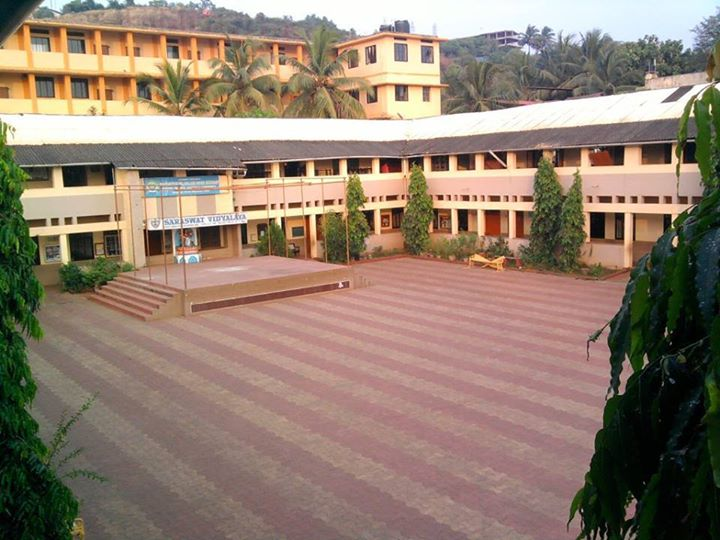
Saraswat Vidyalaya

Saraswat Vidyalaya is an educational institution located in Khorlim, Mapusa, Goa, India. It was founded as a primary school by the Saraswat Education Society in March 1911, and gave instruction in the Marathi language. The original school building near to Mapusa police station survives and was repurposed as a bank after the school moved to Khorlim. Saraswat Vidyalaya is now a high school with feeder units of pre-primary and primary. On the same site, the Society also manages Purushottam Walawalkar Higher Secondary School, founded in 1988 and Sridora Caculo (formerly Saraswat Vidyalaya’s) College of Commerce & Management Studies, established in 1991.

In June 1984, the society has established Swar-Shrungar, a music school where tabla, harmonium, flute and vocal music are taught.

Besides the general streams, the higher secondary manages vocational courses in Auto Engineering Technology, Office Secretaryship/Stenography and Accountancy and Auditing, Floriculture and Landscaping.

From June 1990, the management has established an Institute of Management and Human Resources Development that conducts short term job oriented courses. A new study center of Yeshwantrao Chavan Maharashtra Open University has also been added with the four year degree course in Horticulture.

From June 2000 B.B.A degree course has been started that caters to the needs of youth from North Goa.
