= Purandar Fort =

Fort in Maharashtra, India

- Pune district, Maharashtra
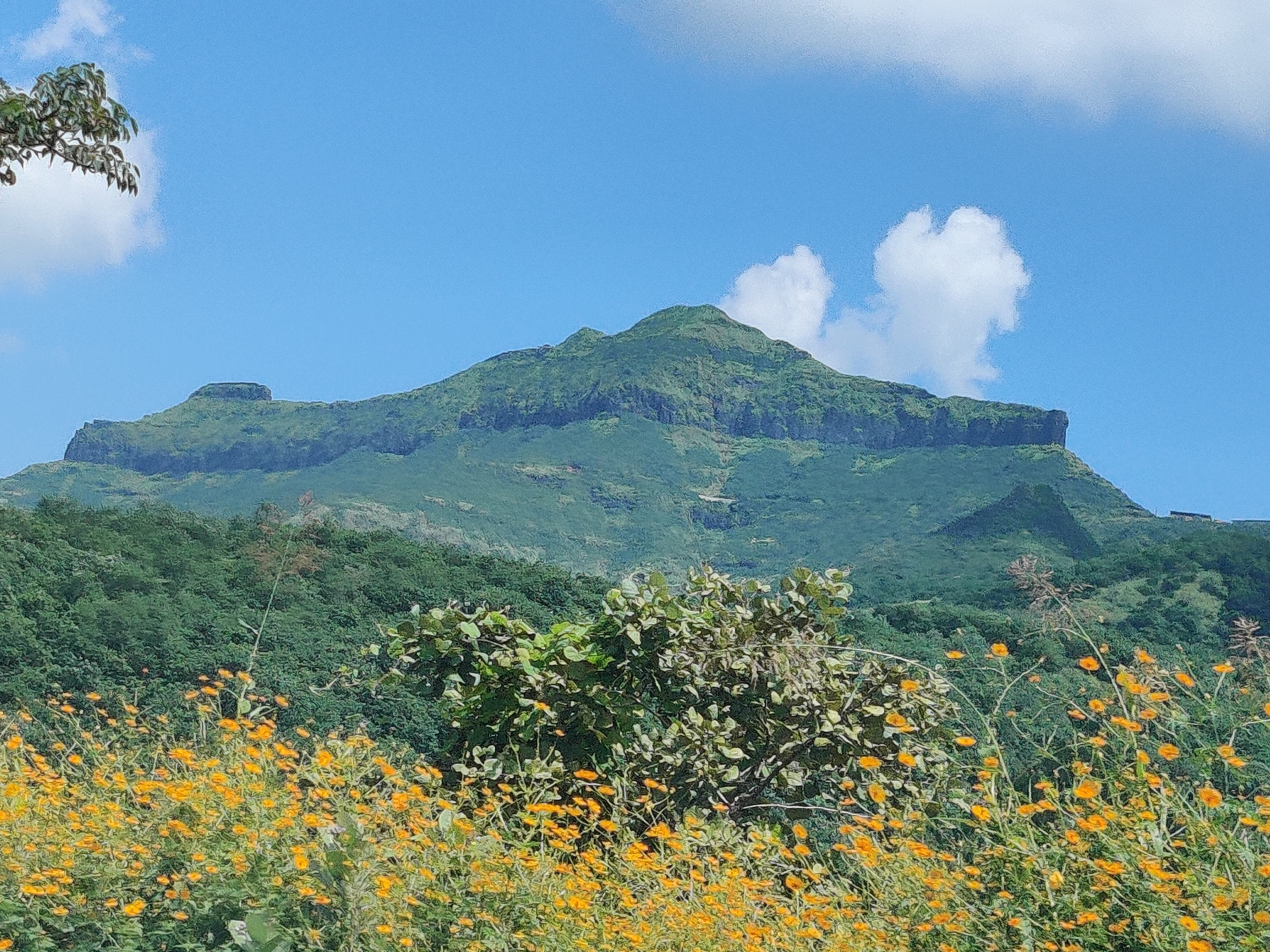
- Purandar Fort

Site information
- Type: Hill fort
- Owner: Government of India
- Open to the public: Yes
- Condition: Ruins

Location
- Shown within Maharashtra
- Location within India Location within Maharashtra
- Coordinates: 18°16′50.8″N 73°58′25″E
- Height: 1,374 metres (4,508 ft)

Site history
- Materials: Stone

Purandar Fort is a mountain fort in Pune district in the Western Indian state of Maharashtra, India. The fort stands at 1,374 metres (4,508 ft) above sea level in the Western Ghats, 50 kilometres (31 mi) to the southeast of Pune.

The twin forts of Purandar (or Indraneel Parwat) and Vajragad (or Rudramal) of which the latter is the smaller of the two, is located on the eastern side of the main fort rising 1,347 metres (4,419 ft) above sea level. The village of Purandar takes its name from this fort. It is the birthplace of Sambhaji Maharaj.

== History ==
The oldest known reference to the existence of the Purandar fort dates back to the Yadava dynasty in the 11th century.

After the end of the Yadava dynasty, the territory surrounding the fort fell into the hands of the invaders who further fortified the Purandar Fort in 1350 A.D. During the early rule of the Bijapur and Ahmednagar kings, Purandar Fort was among the forts directly under the government rule and was never entrusted to Jagirdars.

Under the rule of the Bahamani Sultanate, the fort was besieged several times. To prevent the Purandar Fort from ever falling again, a sacrificial ritual was performed where a man and a woman were buried alive under one of the fort bastions to appease its patron deity. Another ritual was soon performed where the king ordered a minister to bury a first-born son and his mother into the foundation of the bastion which was promptly done with a further offering of gold and bricks. When the bastion was finished, the minister, Yesaji Naik, was given possession of the Purandar Fort and the father of the sacrificed boy was rewarded with two villages.

To protest Adilshahi commander Fatehkhan in 1649 Shivaji took the charge of fort temporarily from Mahadaji Neelkanthrao Sarnaik who was his father's friend and commander of Purandar for 4 generations. On the occasion of Diwali in 1656 after 2 years of death of Mahadajipant Shivaji took advantage of family disputes in Mahadajipant's 4 sons Neelkanth, Shankar, Tryambak/Pilaji and Vishwanath/Visaji and captured the fort. In 1596 A.D, the Bahudar Shah of the Ahmadnagar Sultanate granted the territory of "Pune" and "Supa" to Malojiraje Bhosale, the grandfather of Shivaji. The Purandar Fort was included in the territory.

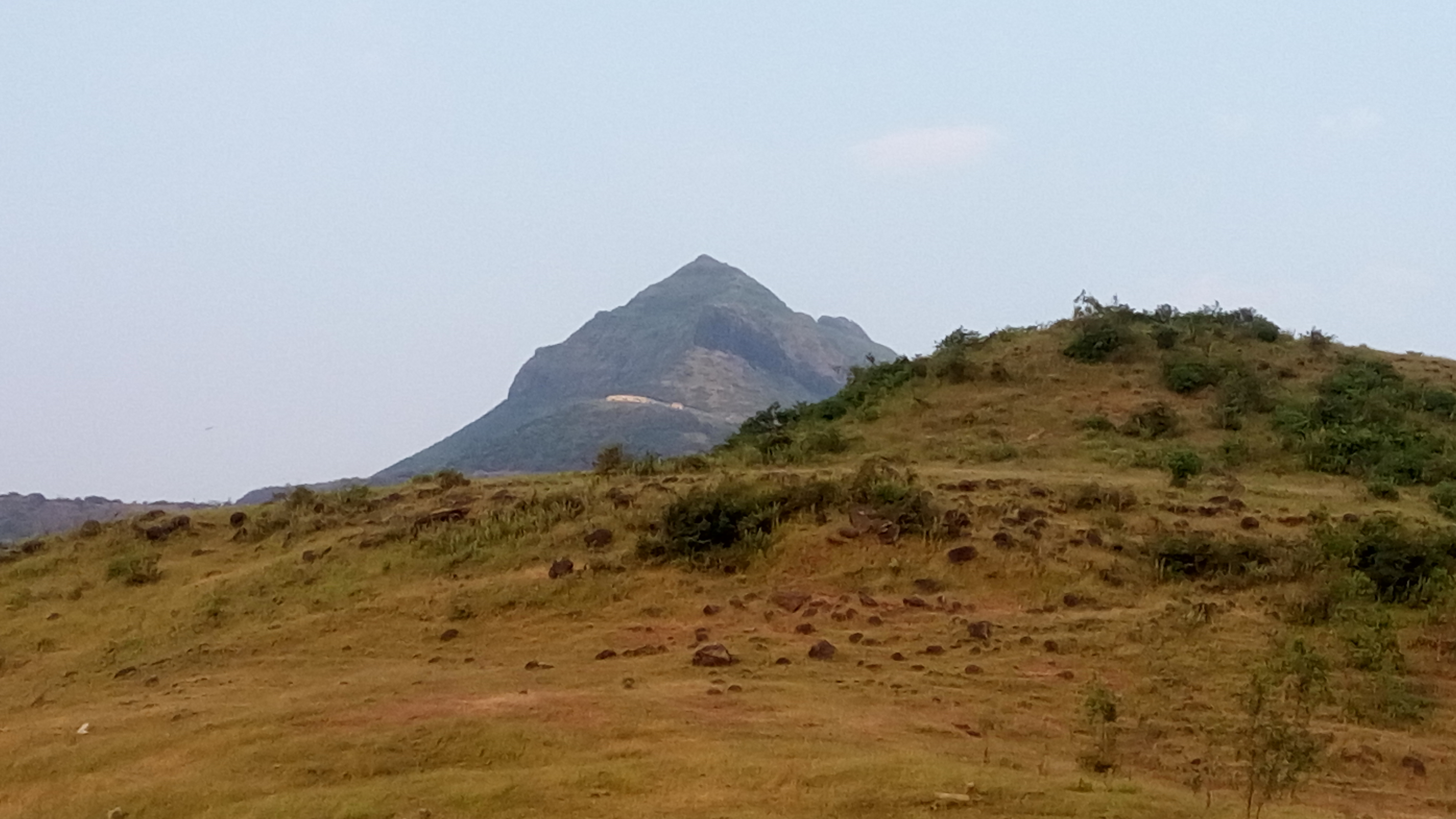
Vajragad Fort

In 1649 A.D, Shivaji, still in his youth, in one of his first victories for the Maratha Empire, raided and established control of the fort. In 1665 A.D, the Purandar Fort was besieged by the forces of Aurangzeb, under the command of Jai Singh and assisted by Diler Khan. Murar Baji Deshpande of Mahad, who was appointed as the killedar (keeper of the fort), offered strong resistance against the Mughal forces ultimately giving up his life in a struggle to retain the fort. Shivaji, daunted at the prospect of the fall of his grandfather's fort, signed a treaty known as the First Treaty of Purandar with Aurangzeb in 1665. According to the treaty, Shivaji handed over twenty-three forts including Purandar, and a territory with a revenue of four lakh hons and was made the jagirdar of the territory. On 8th March 1670 the fort was recaptured by Neelakanth Sondev Bhadanekar, Amatya/Mazumdar of Shivaji.

During the tenure of Rajaram (1689-1700) Mughal captured the fort once again but soon Marathas took the charge back under the leadership of Sachiv/Suranvis Shankaraji Narayan Gandekar. Balaji Vishwanath's family took the shelter on this fort when Krishnarav Khatavkar attacked on Balajipant. Peshwa Nanasaheb took the fort from Shankarajipant's descendants and gave it to Madahev Ambaji a.k.a. Baba Purandare. In 1674 A.D. old guardians Of purender named Ramoshi and Mahadev Koli people rebelled against Neelkanth Mahadev a.k.a. Aba Purandare and captured the fort. On the condition of deposing Aba Purandare and Shankar Ganesh a.k.a. Baba Sarnaik they return the fort to Peshwa.

Under the Peshwa rule, the Purandar Fort acted as a stronghold whenever their capital city of Pune was under attack. In 1776 A.D, a treaty was signed between the British Raj and the Maratha States known as the Second Treaty of Purandar. Its conditions were never fulfilled, being overruled by the subsequent Treaty of Salbai in 1782 between the Bombay Government and Raghunathrao, at the close of the First Anglo-Maratha War.

In 1790, it was conquered by a Koli chief Kuroji Naik and a Victory Bastion also erected here.

In 1818, the Purandar Fort was invaded by a British force under General Pritzler. On 14 March 1818, a British garrison marched into Vajragad (the smaller fort). As Vajragad commanded Purandar, the commandant had to accept terms and the British flag was hoisted at Purandar on 16 March 1818. During the British Raj, the fort was used as a prison. During World War II, it was an internment camp for enemy-alien (i.e. German) families. Jews from Germany were interned. A German prisoner, Dr. H. Goetz was held here during World War II. He studied the fort during his stay and later published a book on it. The fort's major use however, was as a sanatorium for the British soldiers.

The thousand-year-old Narayaneshwar temple of the Hemadpanthi architecture built by the Yadavas still exists at the base village of the fort called Narayanpur.

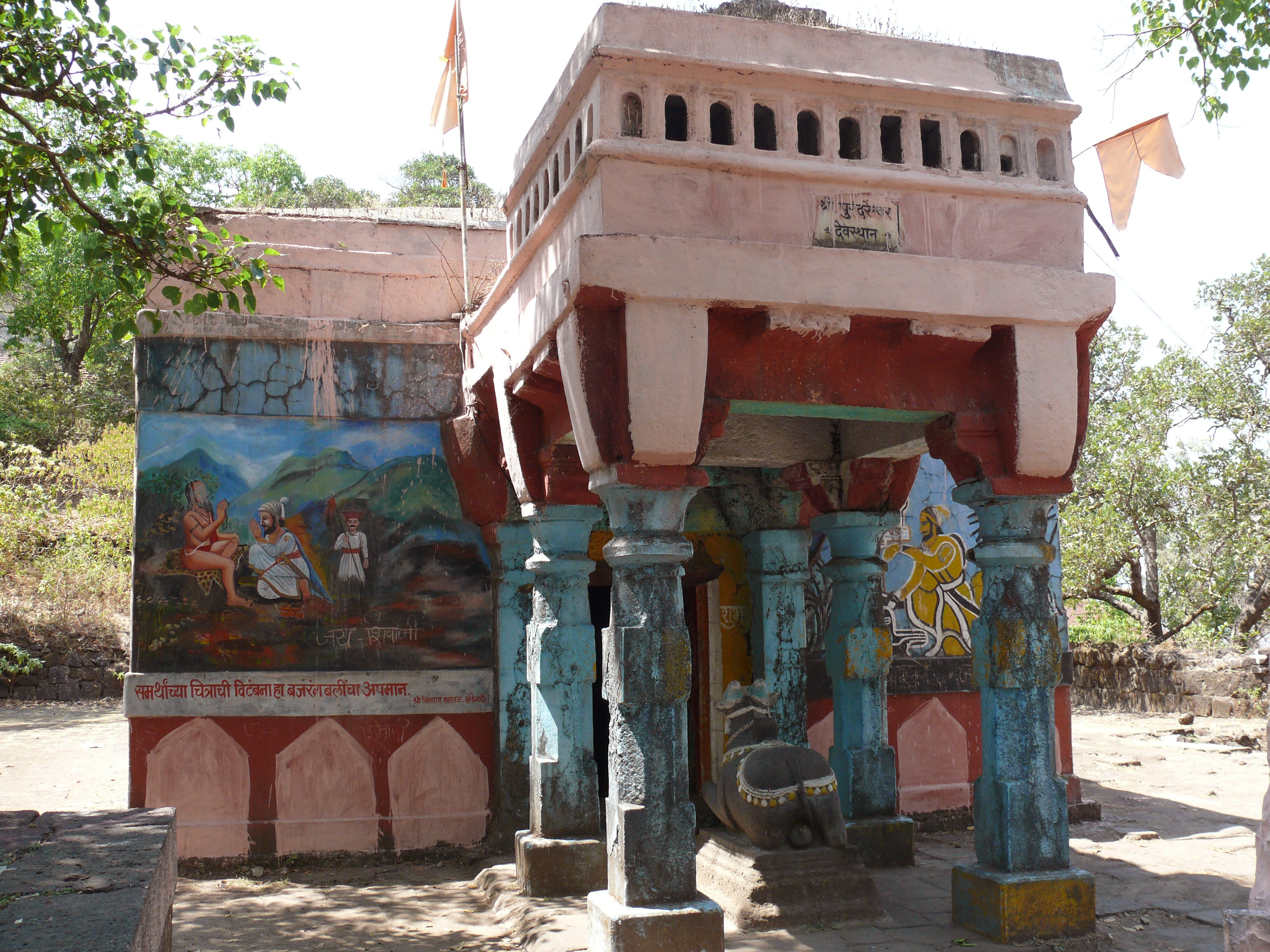
Temple of the Purandeshwar deity from which Purandar takes its name

It is believed that Purandar is the broken part of the Dronagiri Parvat, which Hanuman carried in the Ramayana.

== Structures ==
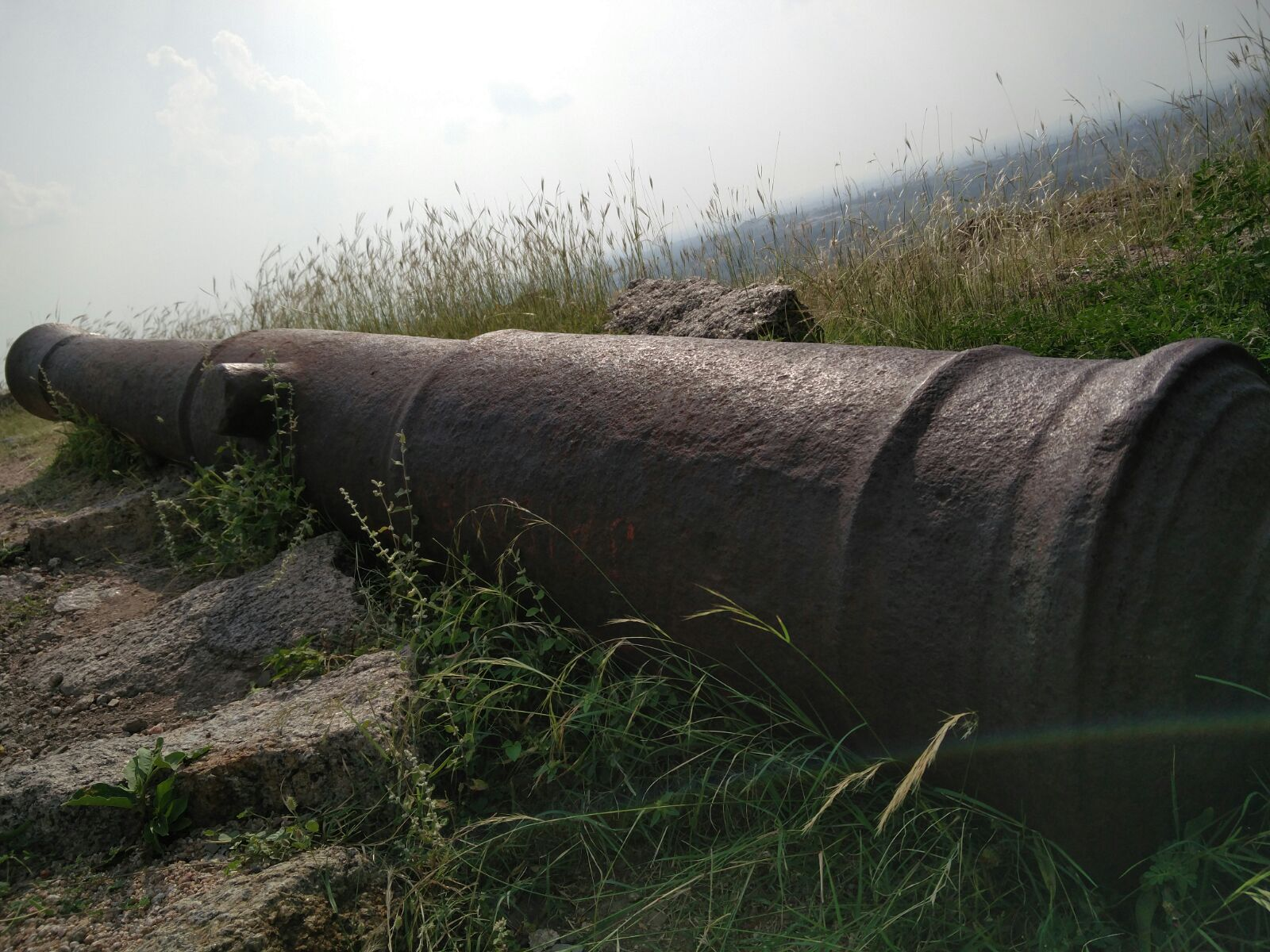
Cannon at the top of the fort

The fort has two distinct levels. The lower part of Purandar is called the machi. North of the machi is a flat area where the cantonment and hospital was housed.

There are many temples dedicated to Purandareshwar (the fort's patron god, from which it also takes its name) and Sawai Madhavrao Peshwa here. There is a statue of Murarbaji Deshpande, the commander (killedar) of the fort who gave up his life in order to protect the fort from the Mughals. The northern part of the machi has a low fall with several bastions and an imposing gate with two towers.

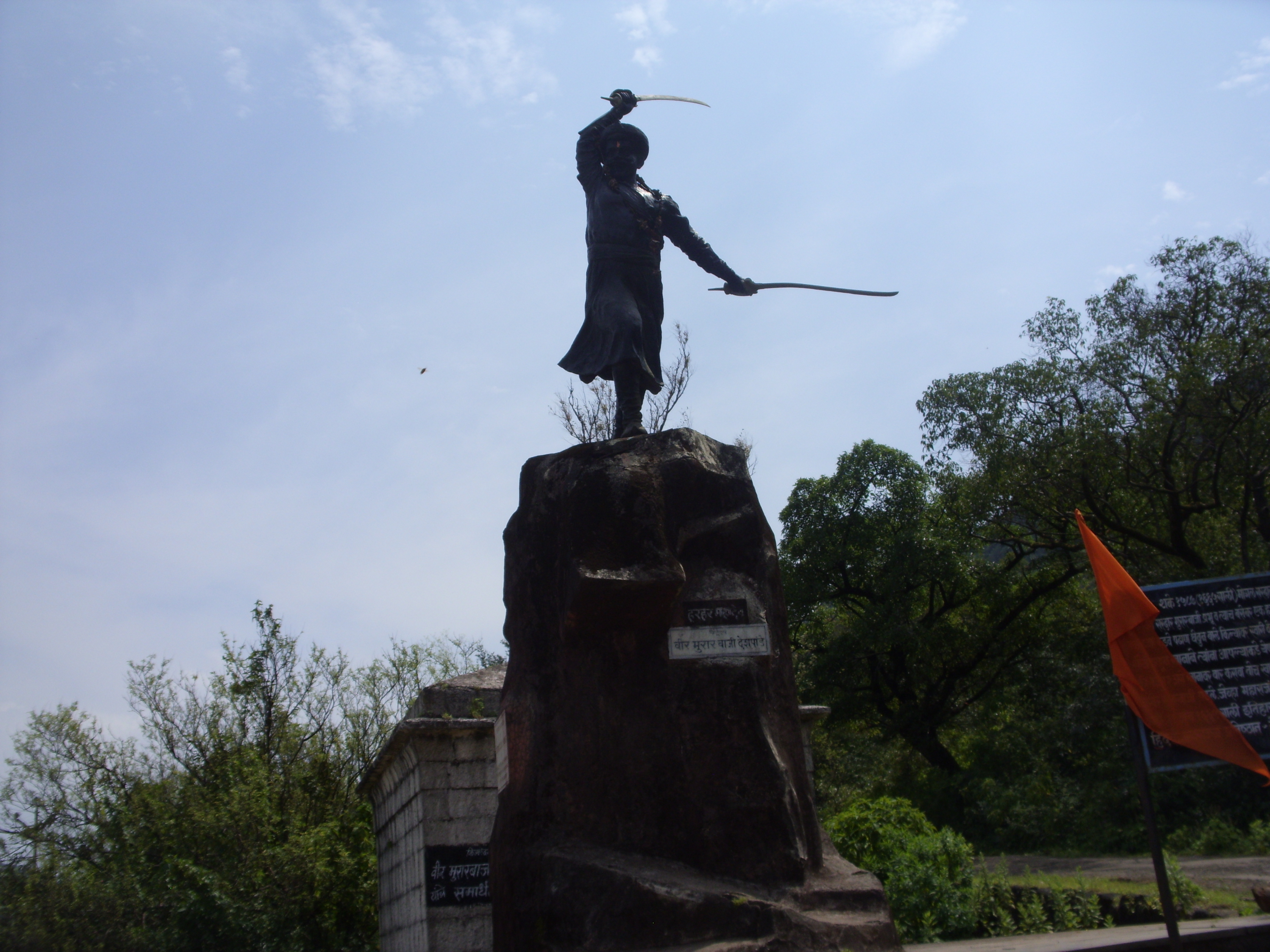
Statue of Murarbaji Deshpande

From the lower level of the machi, a staircase leads to the upper level called Ballekilla. The first structure of the Ballekilla that comes into view is the Dilli Darwaja (Delhi Gate). This area also houses an ancient Kedareshwar (Shiva) temple. The BALLEKILLA is also surrounded by steep drop on three sides.

== Current use ==
The Purandar Fort is a popular tourist destination and is also used by the National Cadet Corps academy for training purposes. The fort is a hotspot for paragliders and trekkers.

== Gallery of Purandar Fort ==
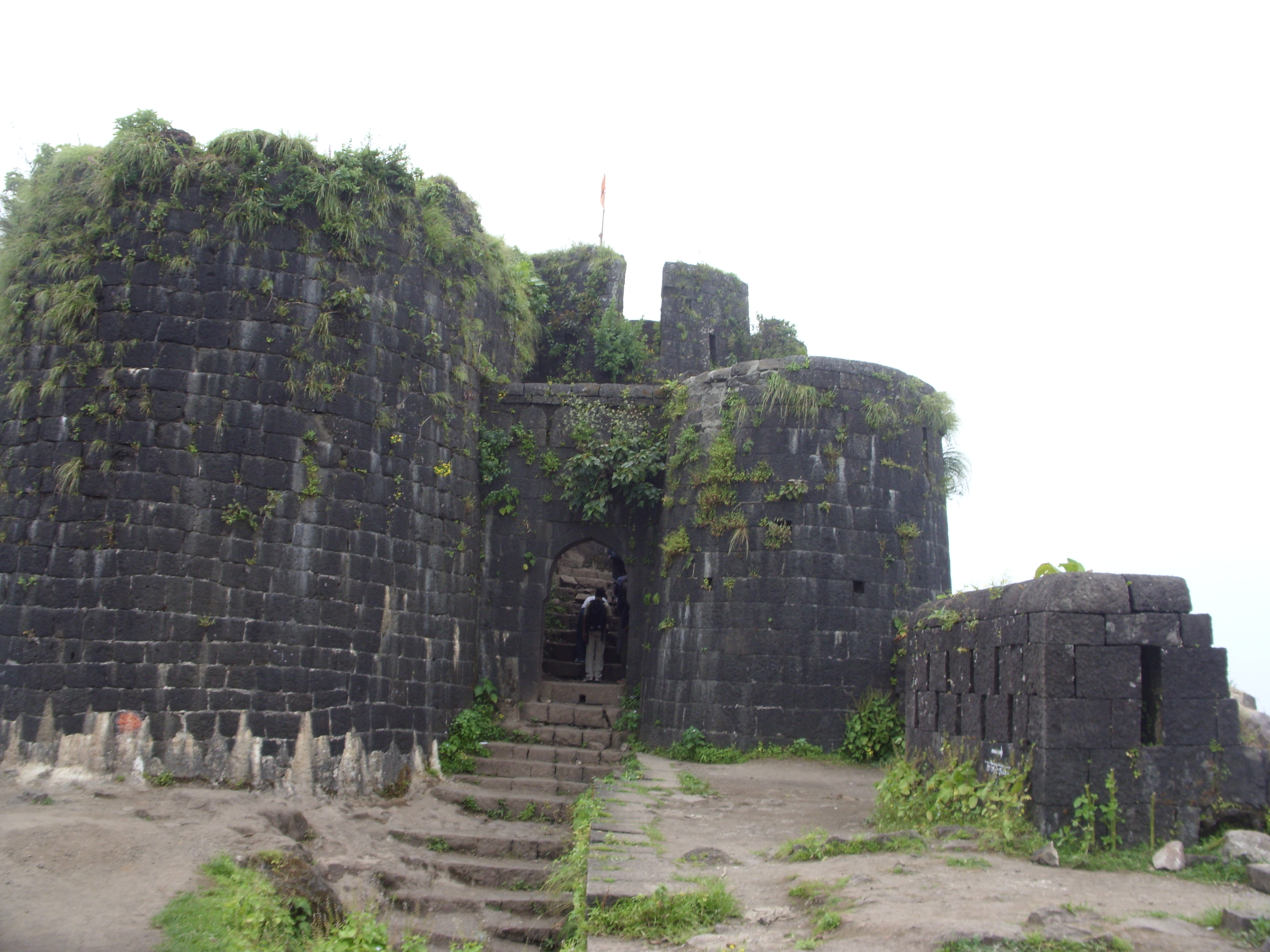

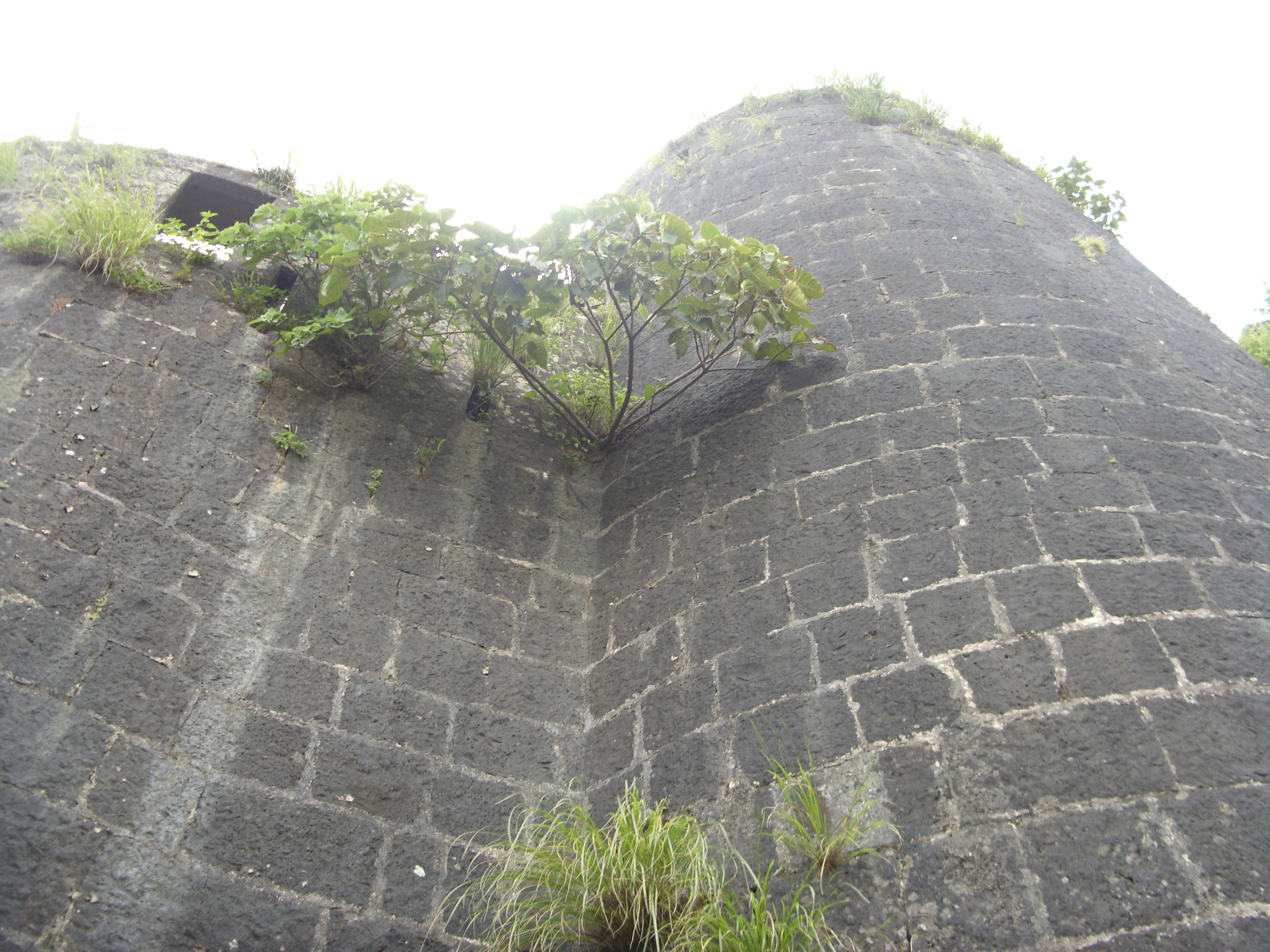

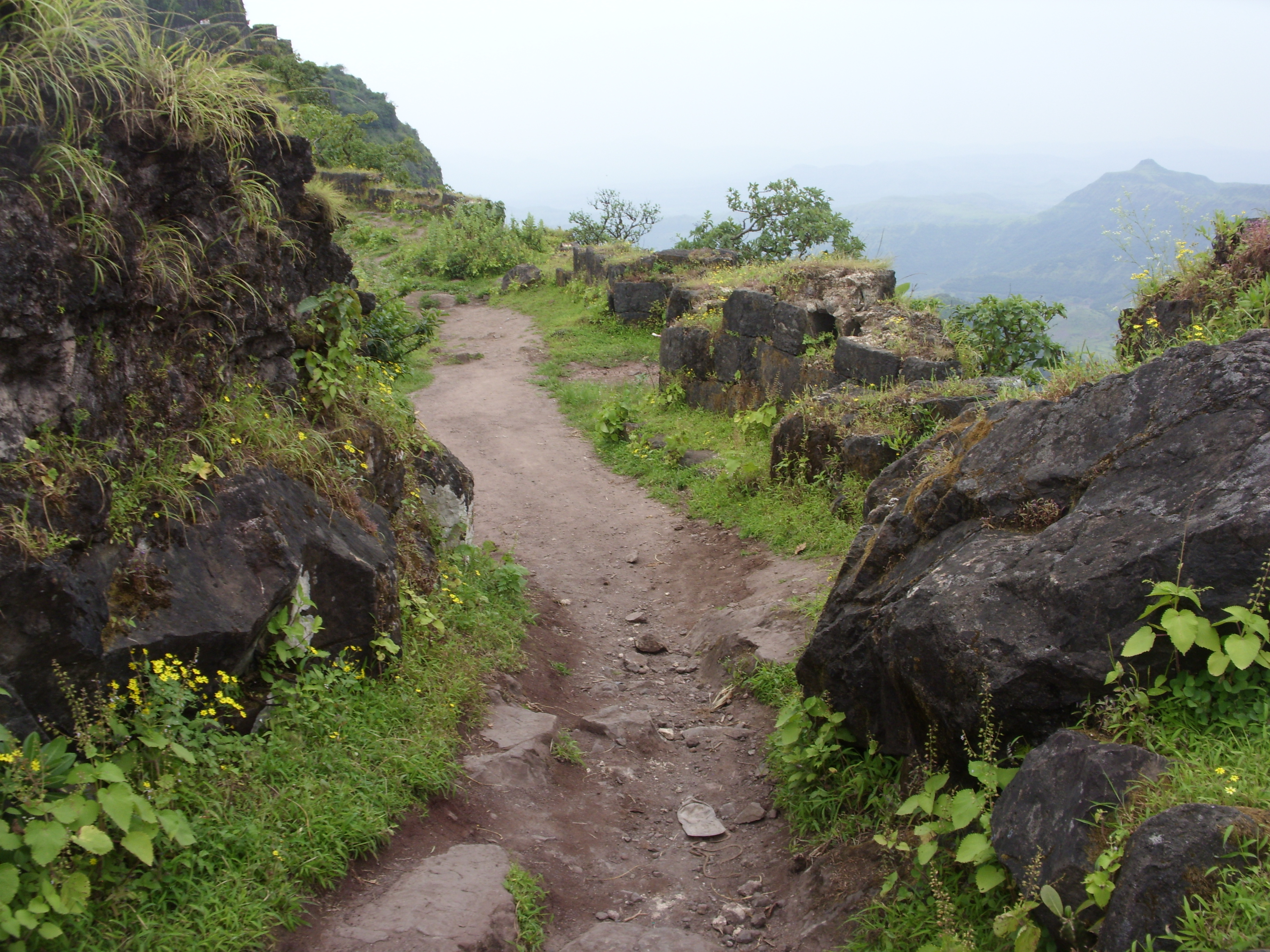

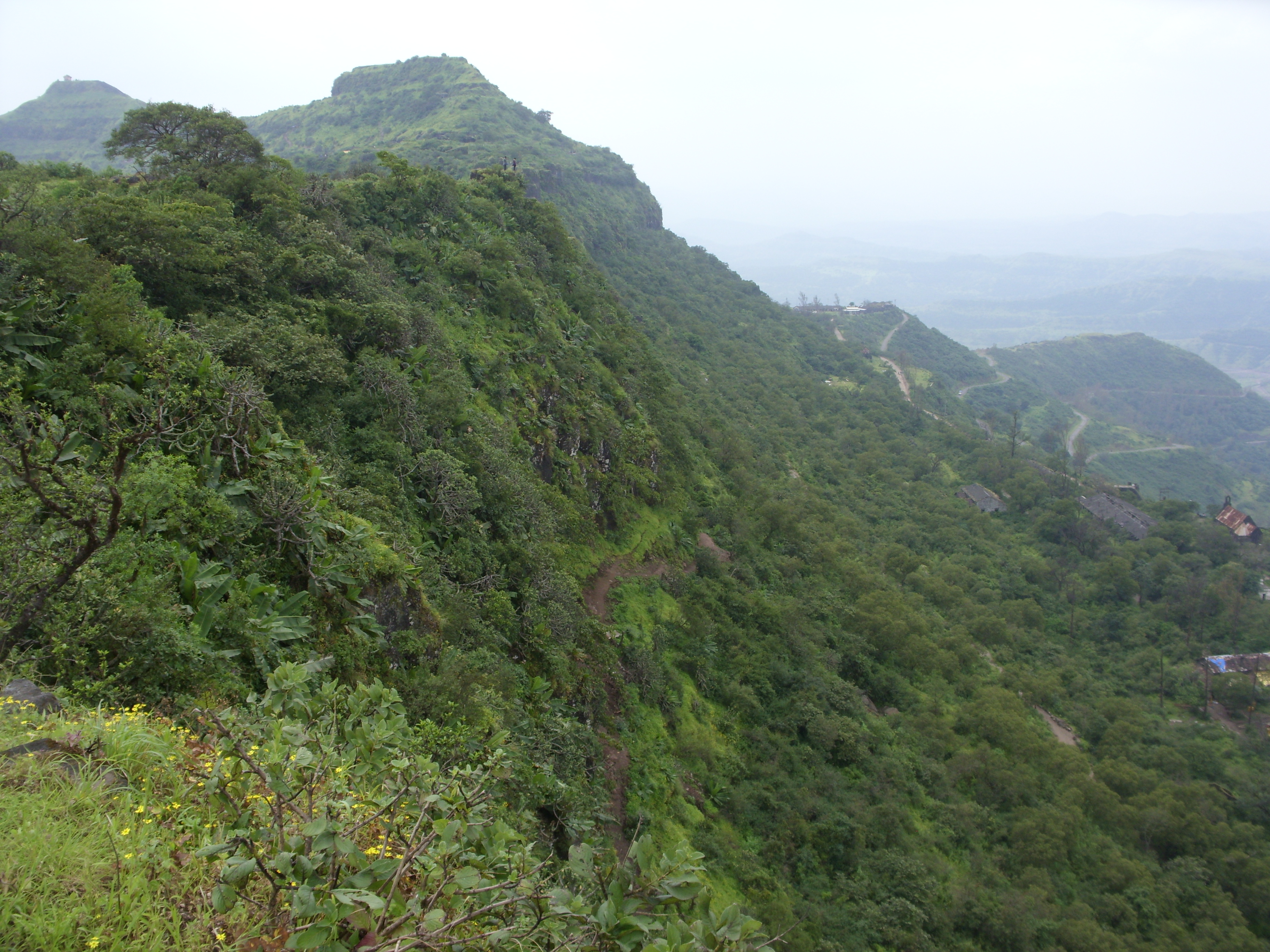

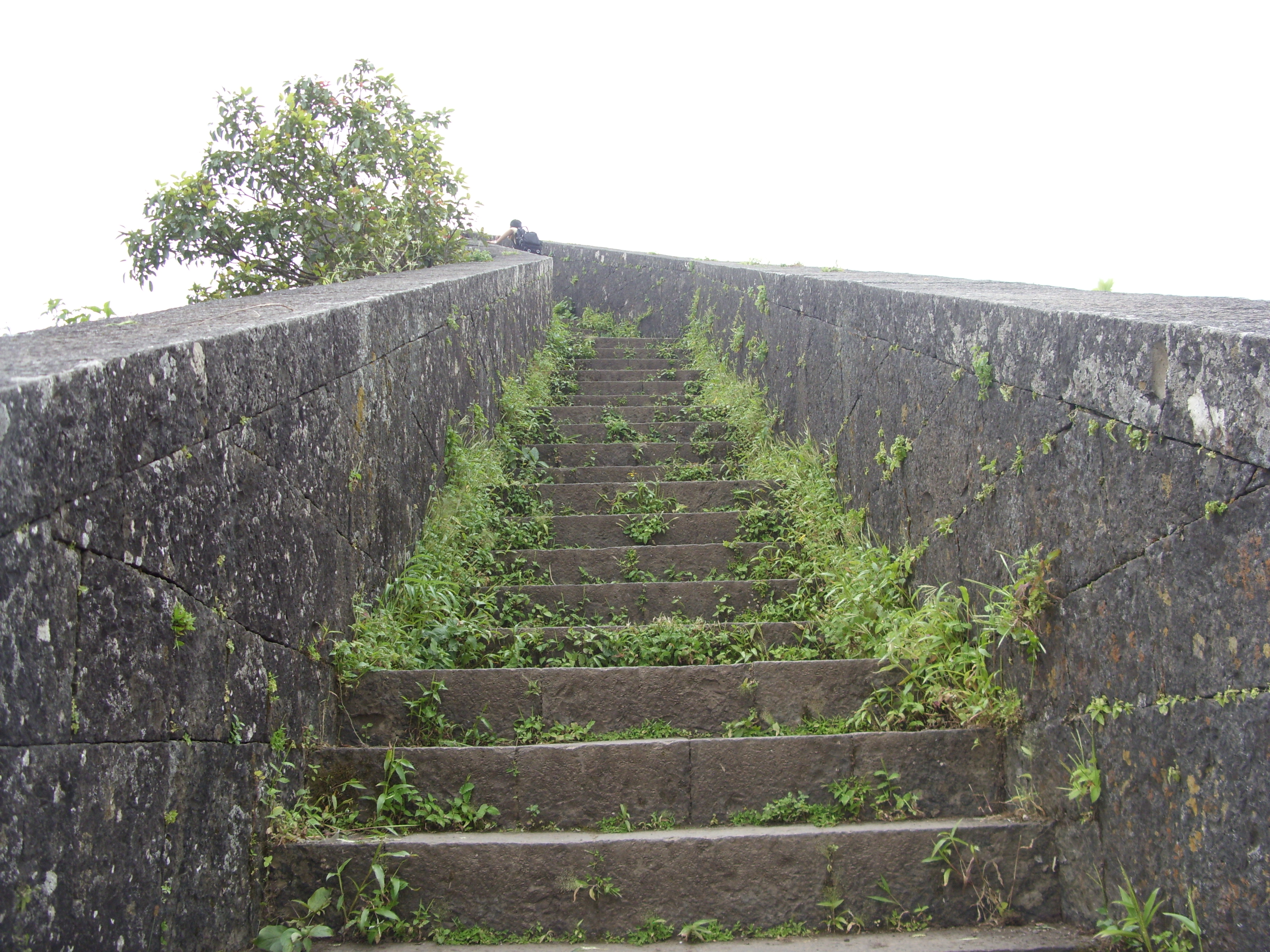

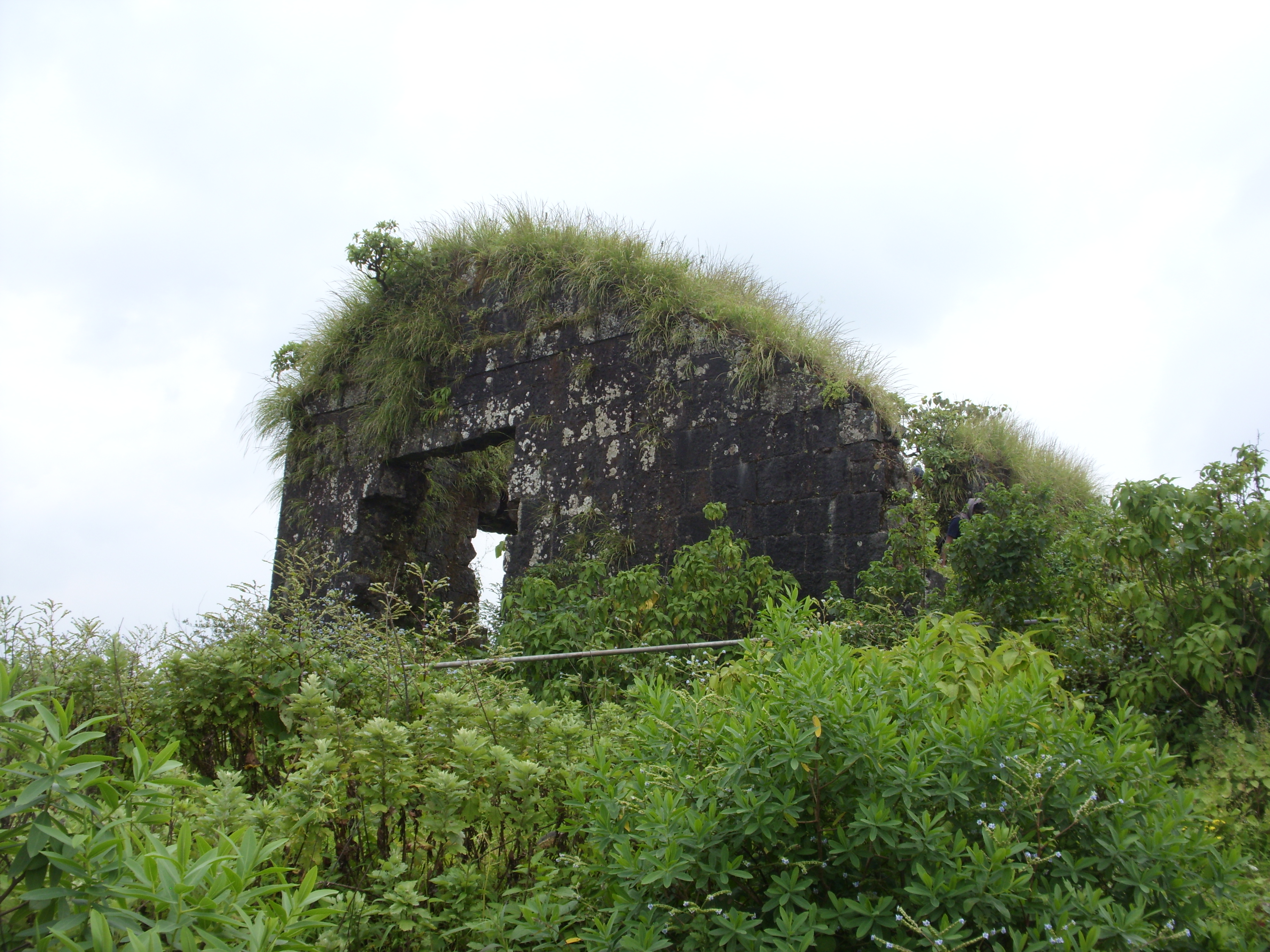

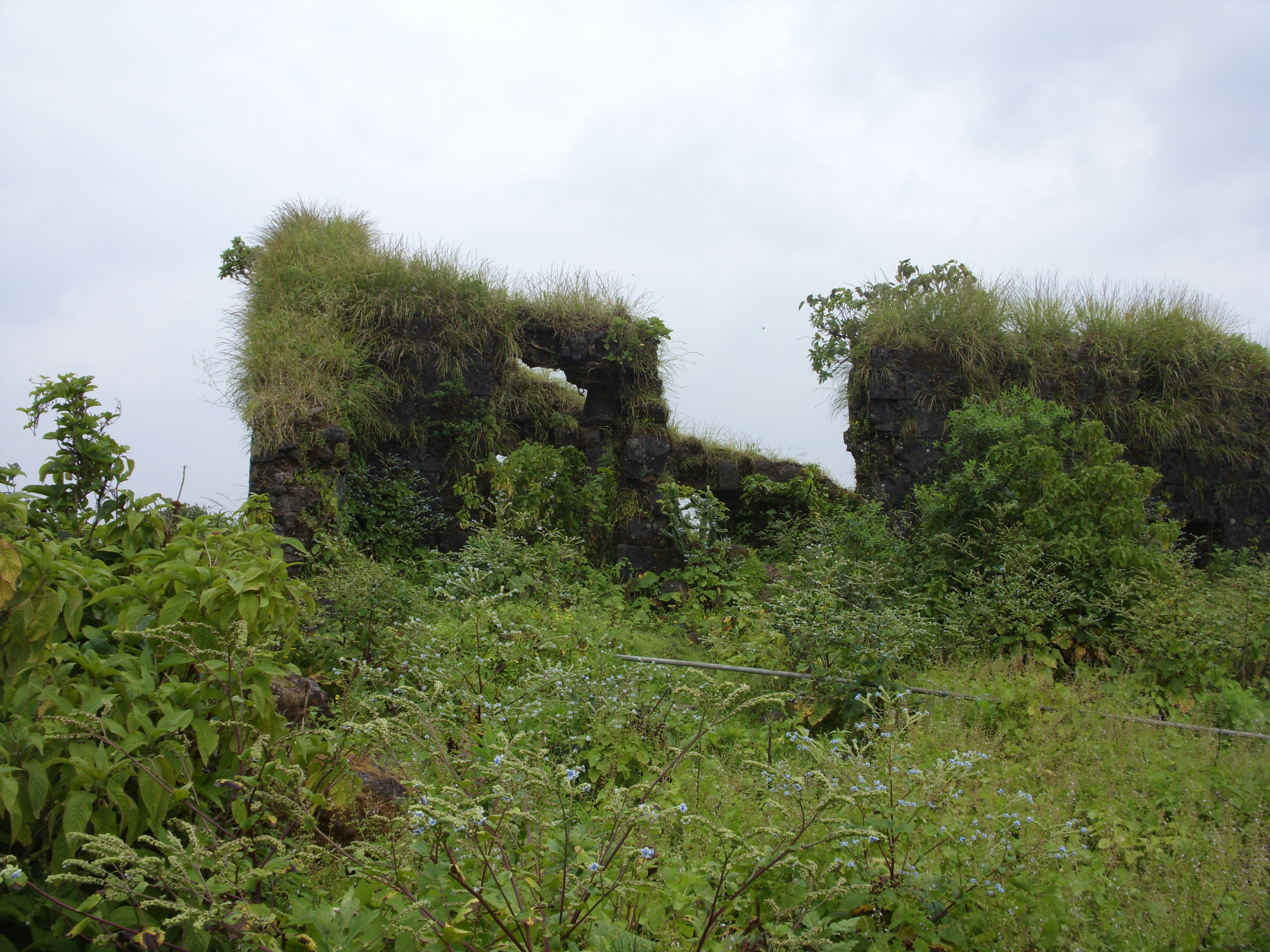

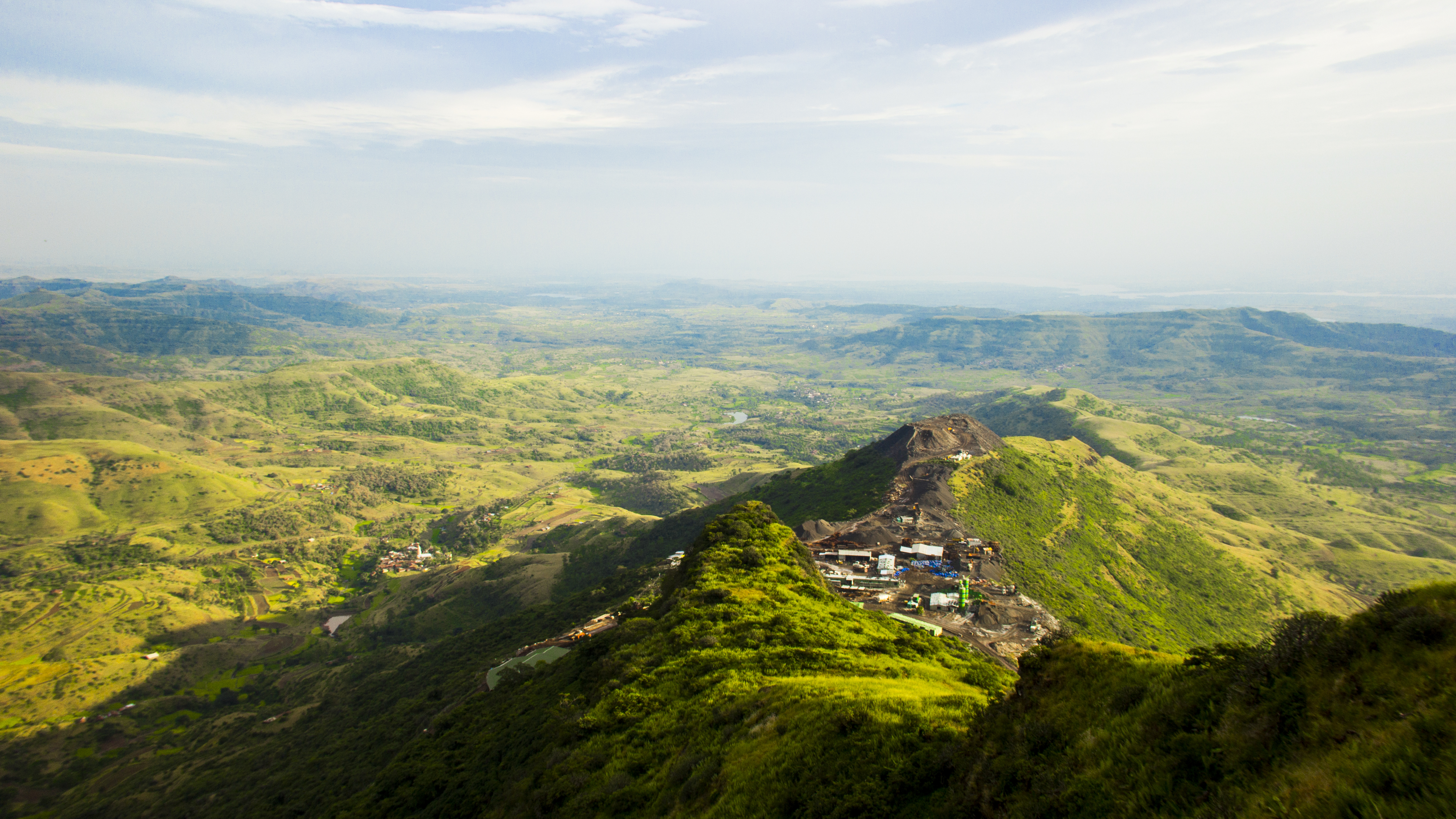

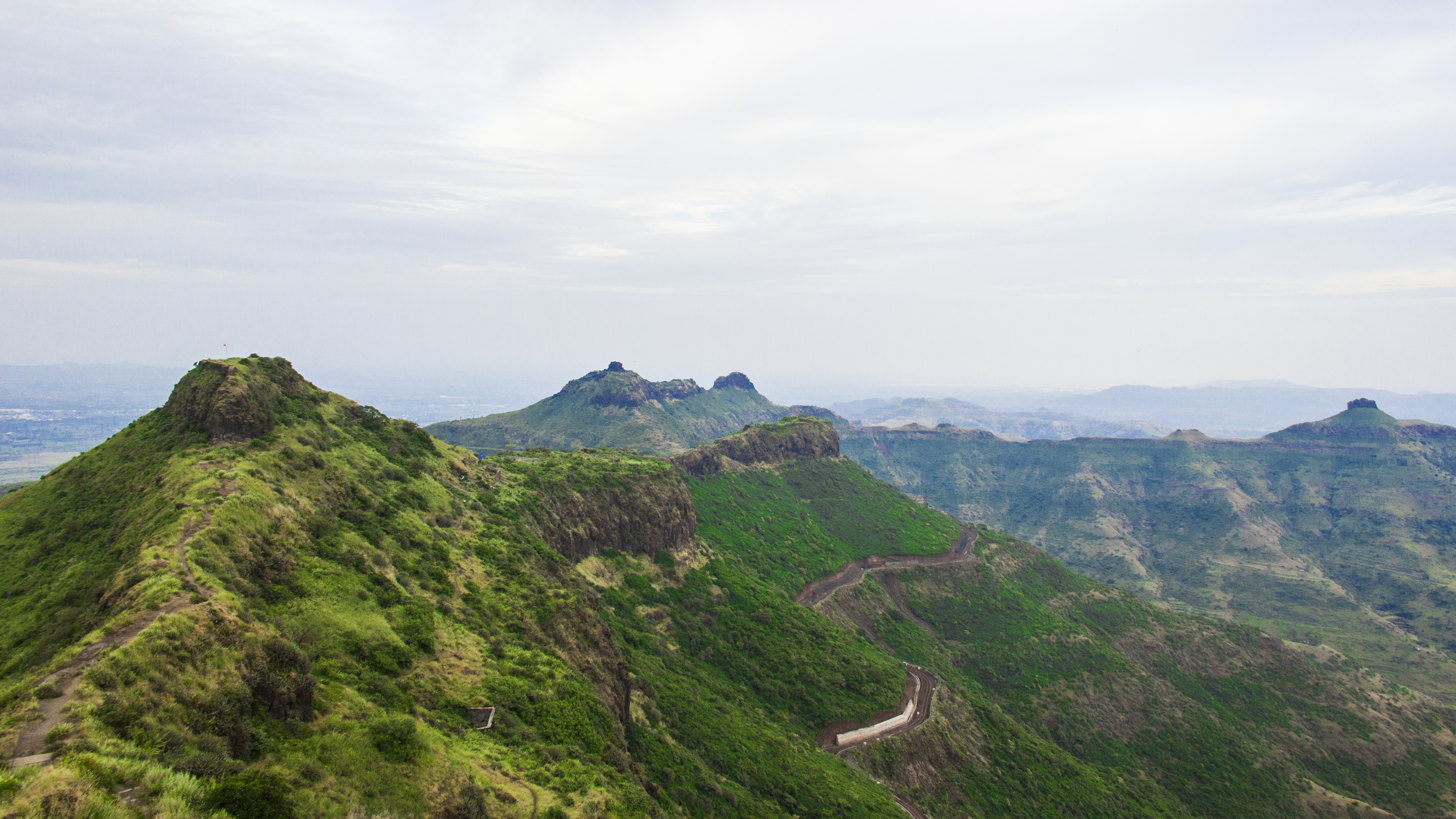

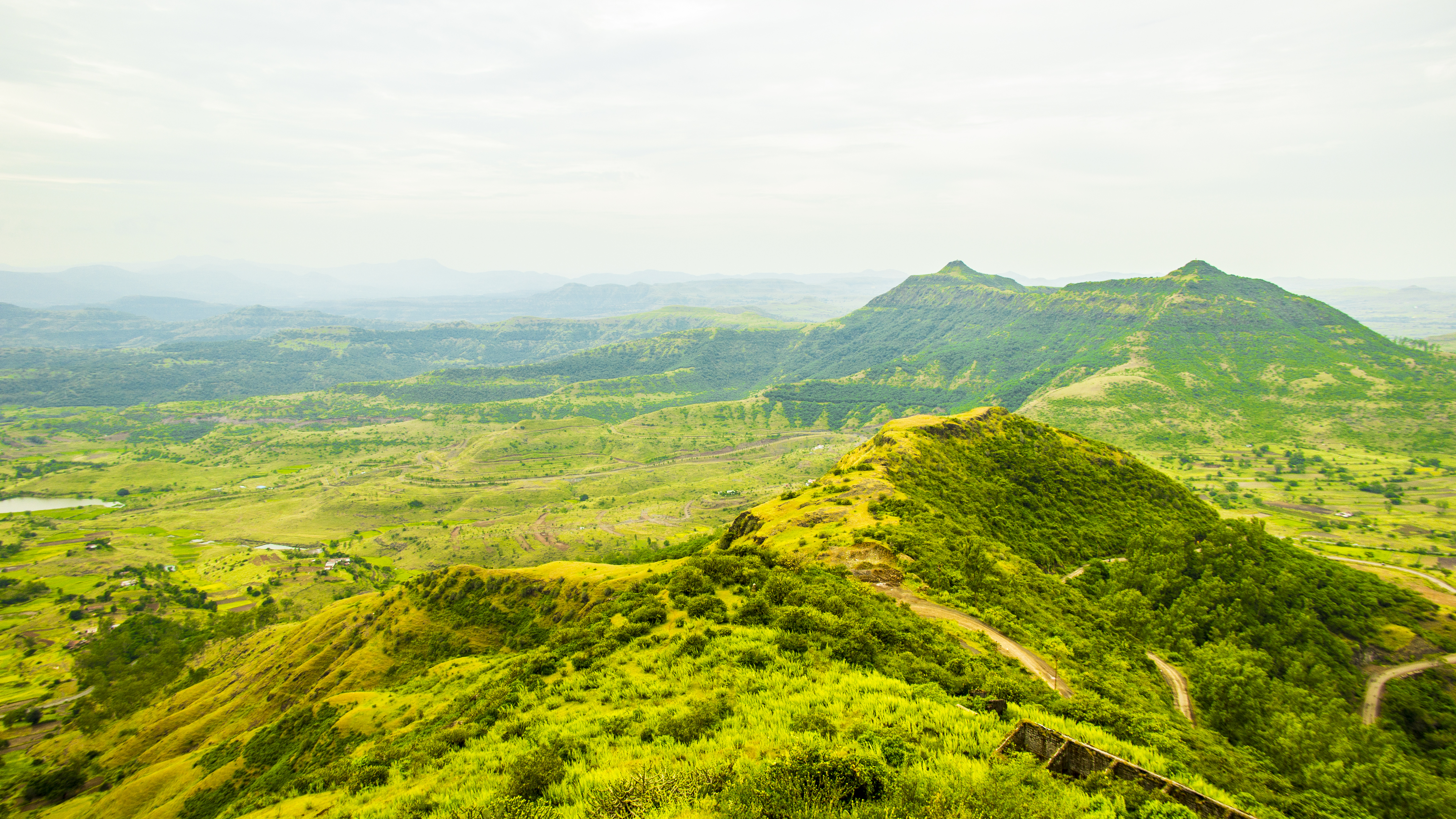

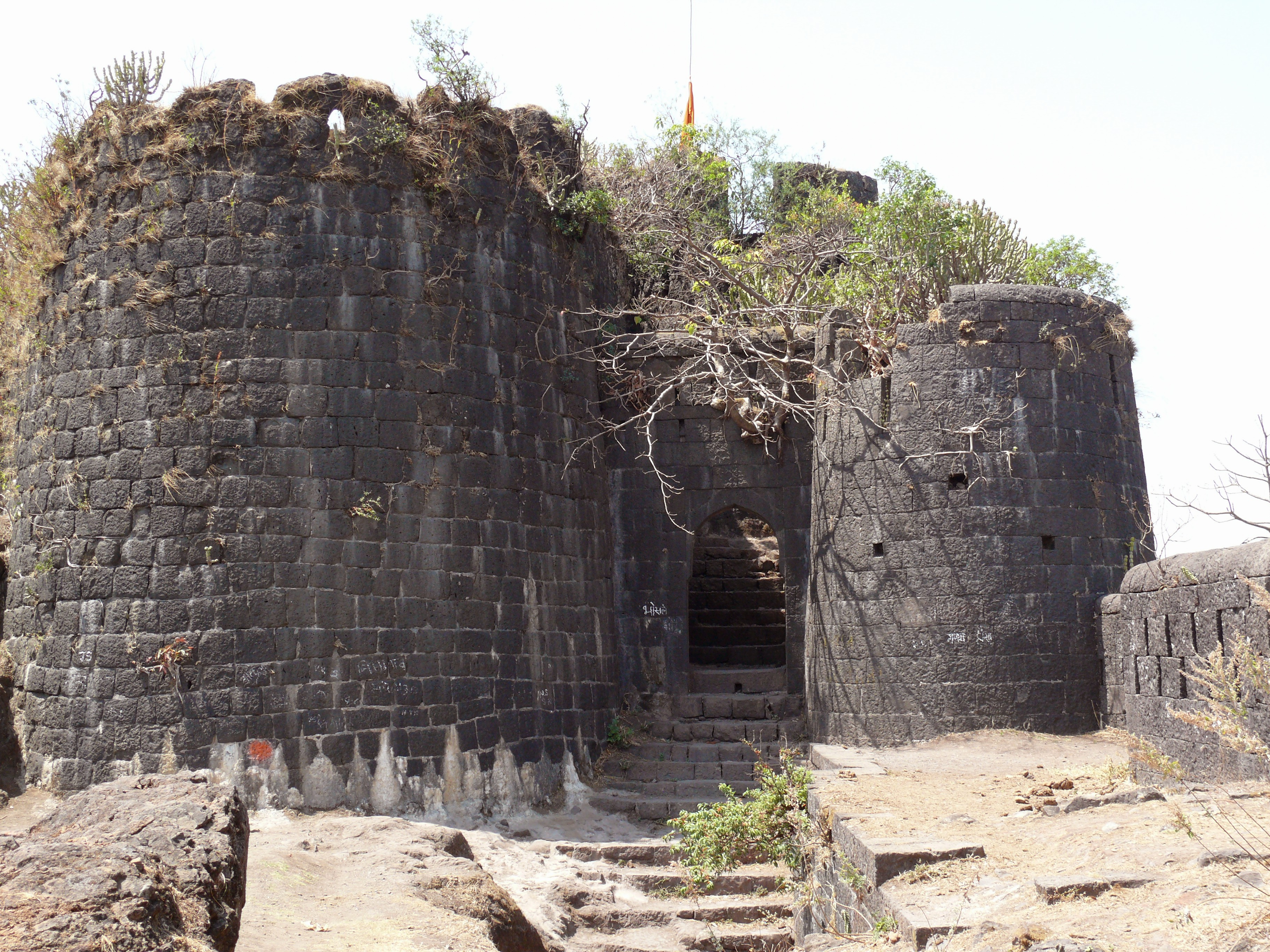

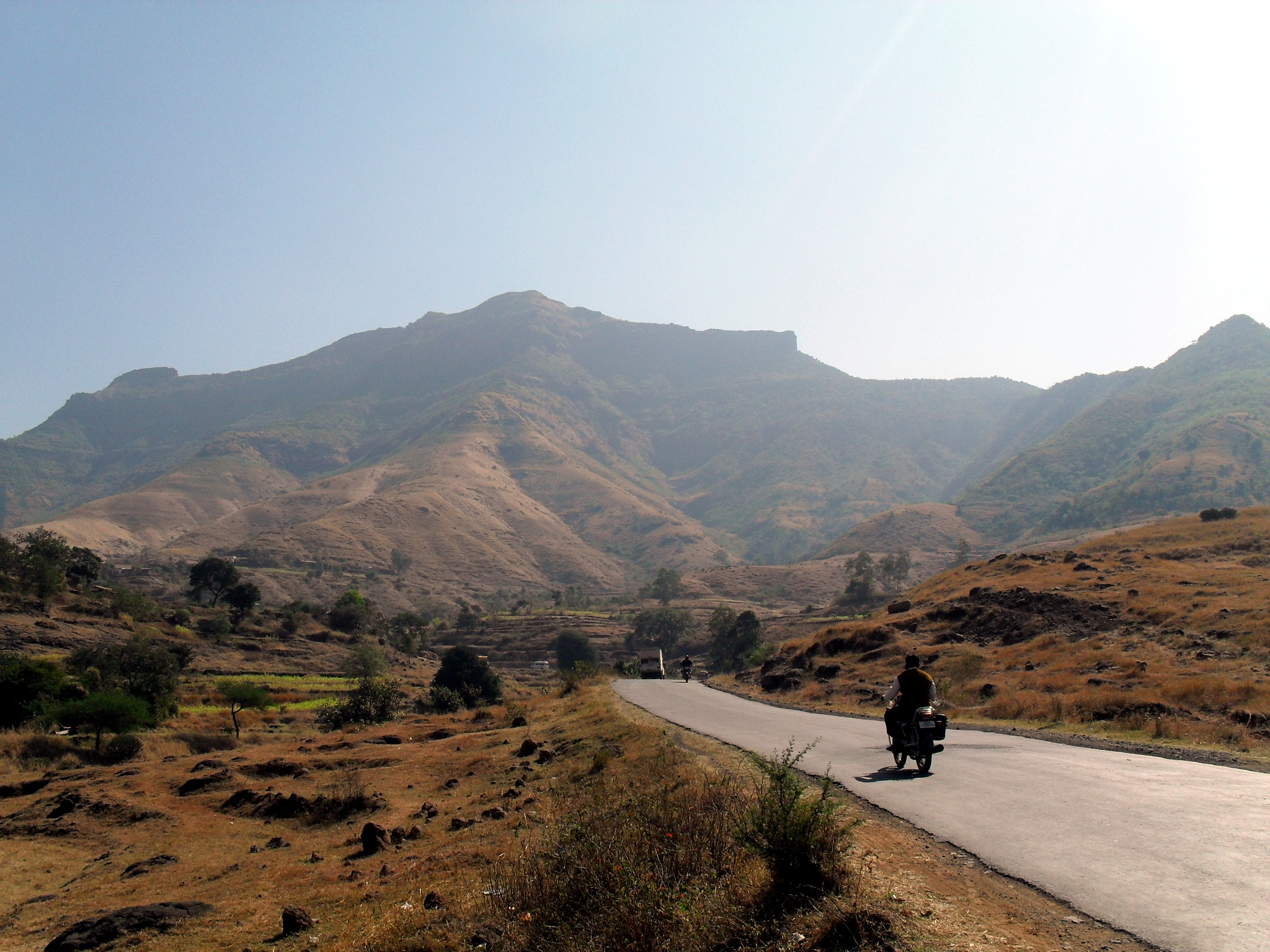

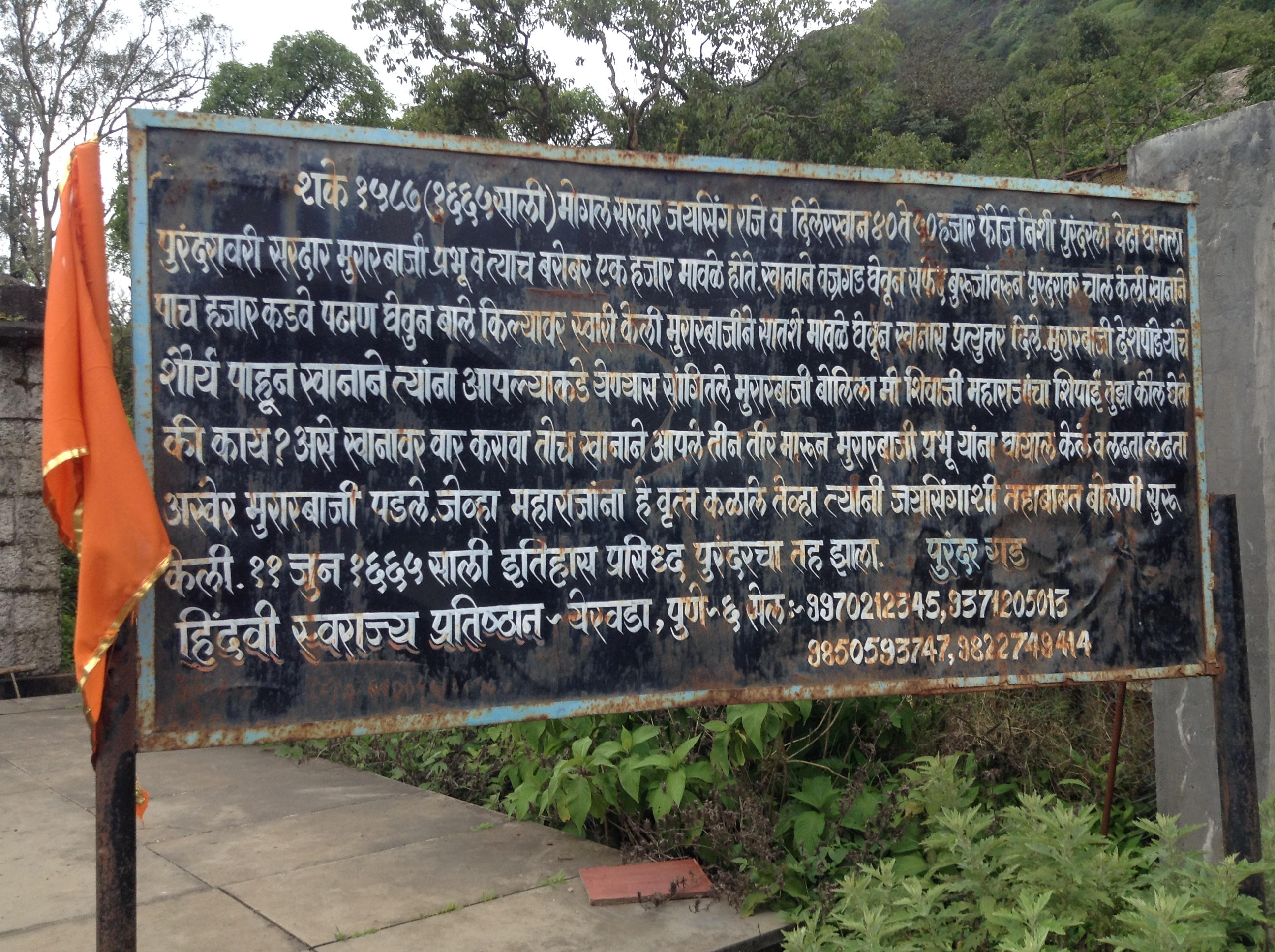

== See also ==
- Chivhe Koli
- List of forts in Maharashtra
