= K. R. Naik =

Indian industrial engineer

K R Naik
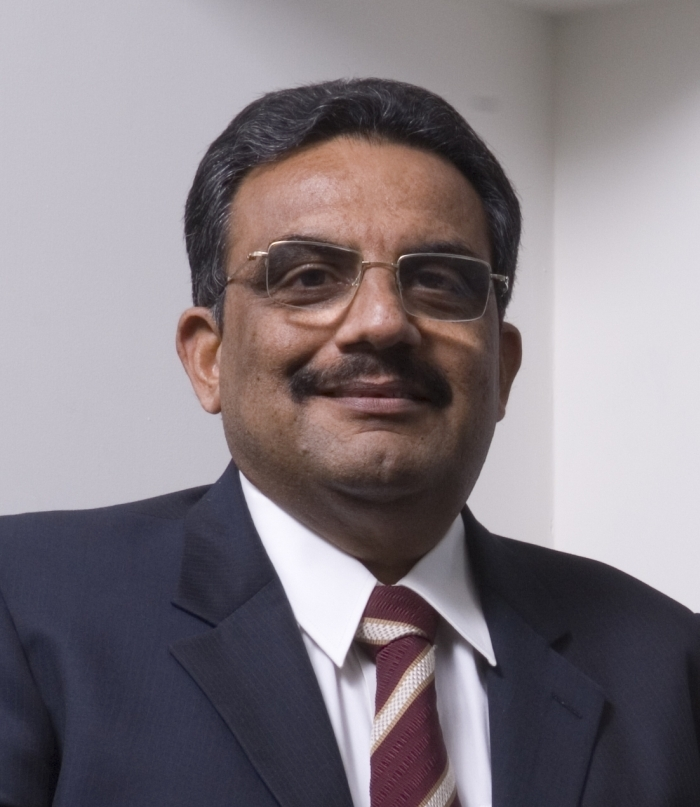
- Born: 19 November 1947 (age 78); Karwar, Karnataka, India
- Education: Jhunjhunwala College, Mumbai; Jamnalal Bajaj Institute, Mumbai
- Occupations: Executive chairman, Smartlink Network Systems Ltd.
- Spouse: Sudha Naik
- Children: Arati Naik, Lakshana Sharma

Kamlaksha Rama Naik, better known as K R Naik (Hindi: क़ रा नायक़) is an Indian industrial engineer. He founded D-Link Ltd. (India) in 1993. In 1994 he entered into a joint venture with a multinational - D-Link Corporation under the name “D-Link India” with a manufacturing facility in Goa and corporate office in Mumbai.

== Early life and education ==
Naik was born in Karwar, Karnataka on 19 November 1947. He completed his schooling in Karwar and later shifted to Mumbai. Naik is a mechanical engineer with a P.G. Diploma in Industrial Engineering and Licenciate in Plastic Engineering. He earned a Business Management degree from the Jamnalal Bajaj Institute in Mumbai.

== Career ==
His first job at Mumbai was with Bradma, but soon after that he joined IBM India in 1970 starting as a Mainframe Peripheral Assembly Engineer. In 1977 he contributed significantly to the development of an indigenous line printer at the 'Big Blue' center. He worked to develop indigenous computer peripheral parts of plastic and metal until IBM closed its Indian operation in 1978. After IBM closed down, he joined ORG System Ltd. wherein he was one of the 6 team members who developed the first indigenous line printers with a speed of 1000+ line per minute.

In 1984, Naik founded Virtual Computer Pvt. Ltd., and was among the first to import a wave-soldering machine to manufacture printed circuit boards of PCs.

From 1990–91, Naik entered into networking products as a distributor of D-Link brand products. Within 3 years, he decided to start manufacturing of networking products in India as a joint venture with D-Link. Taking financial and tax advantages offered by the government of Goa, he shifted manufacturing operations from the Ansa Industrial Estate in Mumbai to Verna Electronic City, Goa. In 1994–95 he also started a passive networking-products company together with UK-based passive components company Sapphire UK Ltd. In 1994, he entered into a joint venture with D-Link Corporation Taiwan and helped constructing new buildings and importing SMT lines from Japan.

In 1995, Naik set out to create a completely new channel for D-Link products. Rather than going after large distributors he decided to put a regional distribution model in place—arguably the first in India among the IT channel.

== Honours and awards ==
Year	Name	Awarding organization	Ref
2012	Outstanding Channel Contribution	CRN, UBM India	
2011	TOP SME ENTREPRENEUR 2010–11	SME Channels	
2003-4	President of MAIT	MAIT	

== Personal life ==
Naik's wife Sudha Naik is a homemaker; they have 2 daughters: Arati Naik and Dr. Lakshana Sharma (who is married to Dr. Amit Sharma).
