= Kuroji Naik =

Subedar of Maratha army

Kuroji Naik (also spelled as Koorojee Naik) was subedar of Maratha army under Peshwa of Maratha Empire during reign of Shahu II.

== History ==
In 1790, Kuroji Naik assembled the naiks of Bavan Maval and raised a Mavala army and attacked at Purandar fort. Kuroji Naik captured the Purandar and offered it to Peshwa because of his duty as Subedar of Maratha army. After taking of Purandar, Peshwa Madhavrao II awarded the Kuroji Naik with the title of Deshmukh and grants of villages and hug amount of money for his bravery and loyalty. Peshwa Madhavrao II also erected the victory bastion (Fatteh Stambh) to remember the bravery and war skills of Kuroji Naik at Purandar fort.

== Titles ==
- Deshmukh, Kuroji Naik was honoured with the title of Deshmukh and received the grant of villages from Peshwa
- Sarnayak, He was honoured with the title of Sarnayak for assembling the Nayaks of Bavan Maval to attack at Purandar fort
- Nayak
