= Suchitra Naik =

Indian politician

Suchitra Naik सुचित्रा नाईक

Ex councillor, Kurar village BJP
- In office 2004–2009

Personal details
- Born: 3 April 1955 (age 71) Mumbai, Maharashtra, India
- Party: BJP
- Children: Ketan Naik
- Website: http://suchitranaik.in

Suchitra Naik (Marathi: सुचित्रा नाईक; born 3 April 1955) is an Indian politician from Malad, Maharashtra, India. She is the Ex councilor Municipal Corporation of Greater Mumbai in the Malad region of Mumbai, Maharashtra.

== Political life ==
Naik started her political career in 1990 post which she contested and got elected in corporation elections from Dindoshi vidhan sabha assembly, Malad (East) in the year 2002. During her tenure, she worked hard to provide basic amenities to the slum living population of Mumbai like sewerage line, fought for reconstruction of old lake, pedestrian skywalks for people to cross major accidental spot on Western Express Highway. In addition to that she fought to protect open government lands like cemetery reserved land, garden reserved land, playground, plots, bad state of roads and recreational reserved land from getting encroached in Kurar village slums.

== Personal life ==
Naik was born on 3 April 1955 in Mumbai, Maharashtra, India in a middle class Hindu Maratha Maharashtrian family. She did her schooling in Mumbai and later graduated from Mumbai University.
