= Daitari Naik =

Indian social worker

- Born: Daitari Naik; Odisha
- Awards: Padma Shri (2019)

Daitari Naik also known as Canal Man of Odisha is an Indian agriculturalist. In 2019, he has been awarded Padma Shri by the Indian Government for his contribution in agriculture.

== Early life ==
Naik hails from Talabaitarani village in Kenojhar district in Odisha.

== Career ==
Naik was awarded Padma Shri for digging out a 3-km tunnel through the Gonasika mountains in Odisha, between 2010 and 2013.

== Awards ==
- Padma Shri in 2019
