= Raigarh Assembly constituency =

Legislative Assembly constituency in Chhattisgarh State, India

Coordinates: 21.89°N 83.4°E

Raigarh
- Constituency No. 16 for the Chhattisgarh Legislative Assembly

Constituency details
- Country: India
- Region: Central India
- State: Chhattisgarh
- District: Raigarh
- Lok Sabha constituency: Raigarh
- Established: 1961
- Total electors: 257,432
- Reservation: None

Member of Legislative Assembly
- 6th Chhattisgarh Legislative Assembly
- Incumbent O. P. Choudhary
- Party: Bharatiya Janata Party
- Elected year: 2023

Raigarh is one of the 90 Legislative Assembly constituencies of Chhattisgarh state in India. It is in Raigarh district. The seat used to be part of Madhya Pradesh Legislative Assembly when Chhattisgarh was part of MP.

== Members of Assembly ==
Year	Member	Party
Madhya Pradesh Legislative Assembly
1962	Niranjan Lal Agrawal	Indian National Congress
1967	Ram Kumar Agrawal	Praja Socialist Party
1972	Ram Kumar Agrawal	Indian National Congress
1977	Ram Kumar Agrawal	Indian National Congress
1980	Krishna Kumar Agrawal	Indian National Congress
1985	Krishna Kumar Agrawal	Indian National Congress
1990	Krishna Kumar Agrawal	Indian National Congress
1993	Krishna Kumar Agrawal	Indian National Congress
1998	Krishna Kumar Agrawal	Indian National Congress
Chhattisgarh Legislative Assembly
2003	Vijay Agrawal	Bharatiya Janata Party
2008	Dr. Shakrajeet Nayak	Indian National Congress
2013	Roshan Lal Agrawal	Bharatiya Janata Party
2018	Prakash Nayak	Indian National Congress
2023	O. P. Choudhary	Bharatiya Janata Party

== Election results ==
=== 2023 ===
Chhattisgarh Legislative Assembly Election, 2018: Raigarh
Party	Candidate	Votes	%	±%
BJP	O. P. Choudhary	129,134	63.21	+34.76
INC	Prakash Shakrajeet Nayak	64,691	31.66	−4.40
NOTA	None of the Above	758	0.37	−0.79
Majority		64,443	31.55	+23.94
Turnout		2,04,308		
BJP gain from INC		Swing		

=== 2018 ===
Chhattisgarh Legislative Assembly Election, 2018: Raigarh
Party	Candidate	Votes	%	±%
INC	Prakash Shakrajeet Naik	69,062	36.06	
BJP	Roshanlal Agarwal	54,482	28.45	
Independent	Vijay Agrawal	42,914	22.41	
Independent	Ravishankar Patel	7,823	4.08	
JCC	Vibhas Singh Thakur	5,823	3.04	
BTP	Birsingh Nagesh	2,114	1.10	
Independent	Mukund Gupta	1,918	1.00	
NOTA	None of the Above	2,215	1.16	
Majority		14,580	7.61	
Turnout		1,91,533	77.11	
INC gain from BJP		Swing		

== See also ==
- Raigarh District
- List of constituencies of Chhattisgarh Legislative Assembly
