= Raj Naik =

Indian former first-class cricketer

Rajesh Naik
Personal information
- Full name: Rajesh Rama Naik
- Born: 20 December 1974 (age 51); Mapusa, Goa, India
- Batting: Right-handed
- Bowling: Right-arm off break

Domestic team information
- Years: Team
- 1993/94–2003/04: Goa
- 2010: Dorset

Career statistics
Competition	First-class	List A
Matches	28	21
Runs scored	1,047	326
Batting average	20.52	23.28
100s/50s	1/4	–/1
Top score	133	78*
Balls bowled	779	399
Wickets	2	7
Bowling average	227.00	45.57
5 wickets in innings	–	–
10 wickets in match	–	–
Best bowling	1/75	2/13
Catches/stumpings	9/–	4/–
- Source: Cricinfo, 30 September 2018

Rajesh Rama Naik (born 20 December 1974) is an Indian former first-class cricketer.

== Life and career ==
Naik was born at Mapusa in north Goa. He made his debut for Goa in a List A one-day match against Kerala in December 1993 in the Ranji Trophy One Day competition. He featured twice more for Goa in that seasons competition. Having not featured for Goa since his three initial one-day matches, Naik made a return to the Goan side, returning to one-day action in the 1995–96 Ranji Trophy One Day competition. He made his debut in first-class cricket in January 1996 against Tamil Nadu in the 1995–96 Ranji Trophy. He continued to play first-class and List A one-day cricket for Goa until the 2003–04 season, having by that point played a total of 28 first-class and 20 List A matches for Goa. He scored 1,047 runs in first-class cricket, with a highest score of 133, which was his only century. His batting average was 20.52; he bowled 129.5 overs in first-class cricket, taking two wickets at the high average of 227.00. In List A matches he scored 326 runs, with a top score of 78 not out; he took seven wickets in one-day cricket, with a bowling average of 45.57. Naik also featured in a single List A match for the Will's XI against the Indian Board President's XI in the 1997–98 Wills Trophy at Bhilwara. Naik was dismissed in this match without scoring by Jacob Martin.

Naik later moved to England to coach cricket, where he played club cricket in Dorset and Hampshire. After strong performances in the Dorset league, he was selected to make his debut for Dorset in a friendly 20-over match against Somerset, played as part of Somerset's preparations for the 2010 Twenty20 Cup. He dismissed England international Craig Kieswetter during the match. Later that season, Naik made two appearances for Dorset in the Minor Counties Championship. He opened an Indian restaurant in Bournemouth in 2011.
