= Ranjit Naik =

Ranjit Poojari Naik
- Born: 22 October 1933; Naginayanichervu Tanda village
- Died: 30 July 2004 (aged 70); Mumbai
- Occupations: Architect and social worker
- Known for: Social work
- Spouse: Chandrakala Naik (m. 1962)

Ranjit Poojari Naik (22 October 1933 – 30 July 2004) was an architect and social worker who helped Mumbai slum dwellers. He had an involvement in nearly 50 slum redevelopment projects and was director of the People's Participation Programme. An activist for the Banjara people, Naik spoke at the second World Romani Conference in 1978, where he delivered a paper titled Banjara (Indian Roma) from Barothan.

Naik, who came from Anantapur district, died in a Mumbai hospital on 30 July 2004. At the time of his death, he was incumbent president of the All-India Banjara Seva Sangh and the Sevalal Maharaj Charitable Trust in Sevagarh.

== Bibliography ==
Naik's writings include:

- All India Banjara Sevak Shibir Report (1966) - contributor
- a report submitted on the All India Banjara Study Team Report (1969)
- editor of Banjara published fortnightly in the Telugu language between 1972 and 1975
- editor of Roma – Banjara, published fortnightly in Hindi and English between 1982 and 1986 from Mumbai

He was listed in the acknowledgements of a guide to Banjara embroidery produced by the Census Department, Government of India in 1981.

He was invited to present a paper on Asian Regional Policy Consultation (Habitat II of the United Nations) on 'Access to Land and Security of Tenure for Sustainable Development', Jakarta (Indonesia), 1995. Invited at the Preparatory Committee of United Nations Human Settlement Conference (Habitat-II), New York, 1996. Invited to World City Summit at Istanbul, June 1996. He was nominated as one of the 100 'Best Practices in the world' and awarded "UNCHS 1998 Awards for Excellence in improving Living Environment' by United Nations Habitat-II. This firm has been recognised and awarded a plaque by the Urban Development Ministry of India on achieving this honour.
