= Prakash Naik =

Indian politician

Prakash Nayak
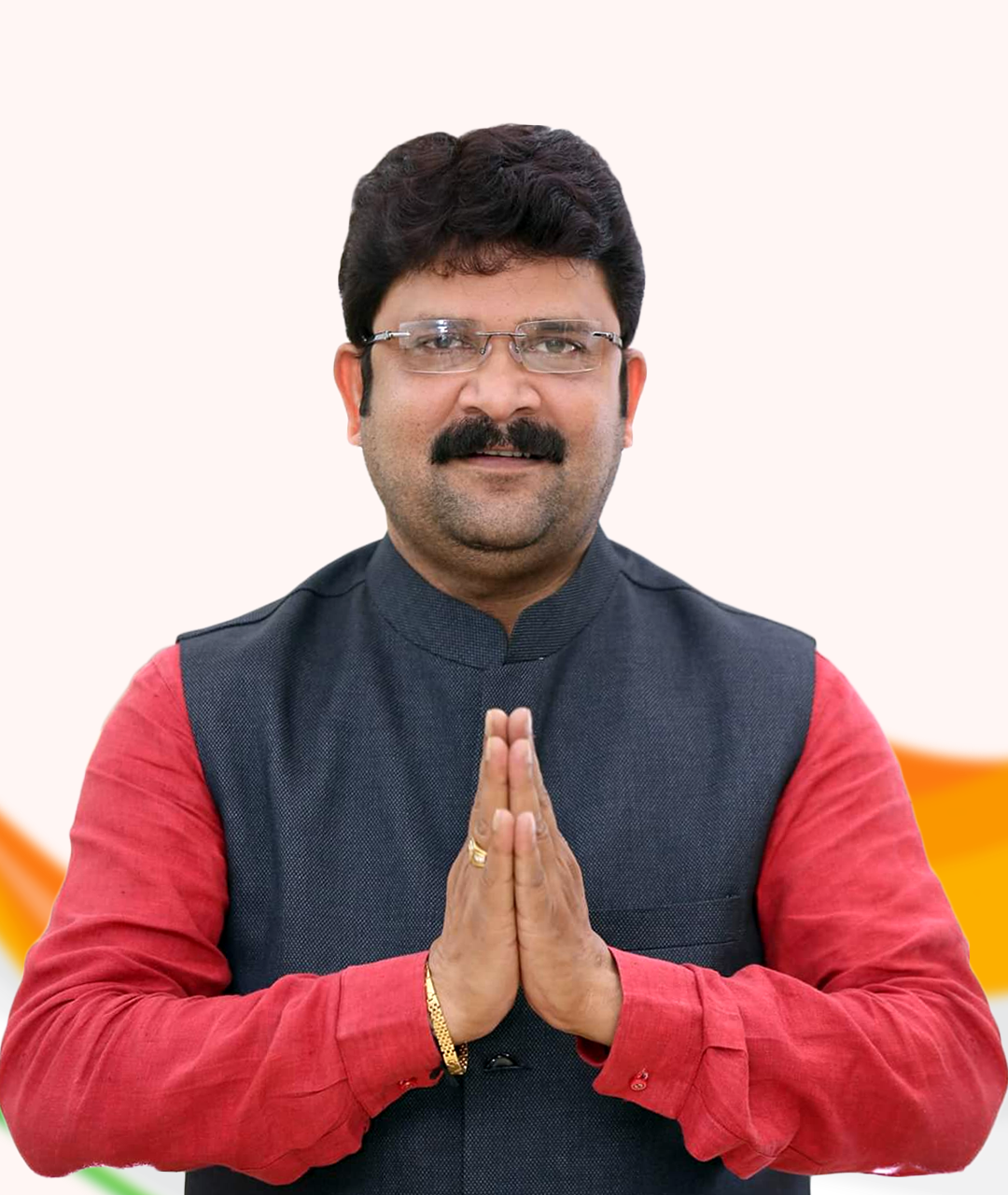
- MLA of Raigarh Assembly

Member of Legislative Assembly for Raigarh
- In office 2018–2023
- Preceded by: Roshan Lal Agrawal
- Succeeded by: O. P. Choudhary

Personal details
- Born: Raigarh, Chhattisgarh, India
- Party: Indian National Congress
- Spouse: Shushma Naik
- Parent: Dr. Shakrajeet Nayak
- Occupation: Politician

Prakash Shakrajeet Nayak (born 7 March 1975) is an Indian politician from Chhattisgarh. Naik was elected as the MLA from Raigarh constituency of the Chhattisgarh assembly in 2018 elections. He represents the Raigarh constituency in the Chhattisgarh Legislative Assembly. He contested from Congress party.

== Early life ==
Prakash Naik is a son of former Congress MLA and former minister Dr. Shakrajeet Nayak on 7 March 1975 in a politicians family who lived in Nawapali, a village in Raigarh district of Madhya Pradesh (present-day Chhattisgarh). His father Dr. Shakrajeet Naik is a former minister and political leader in Raigarh Constituency.

== Educational background ==
Raigarh, Madhya Pradesh (present-day Chhattisgarh).
