= Datta Damodar Naik =

Indian businessperson and writer (born 1954)

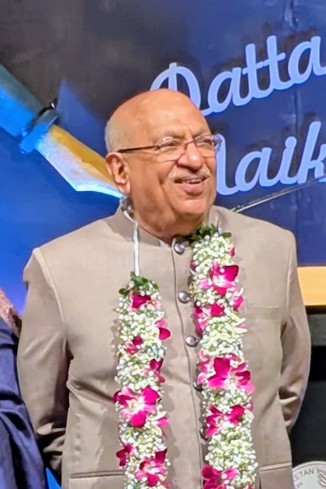
- Naik in 2025
- Born: 30 December 1954 (age 71)
- Occupations: Writer; Businessperson
- Writing career
- Notable work: Jai ki Jui
- Notable awards: Sahitya Akademi Award

Datta Damodar Naik (born 30 December 1954) is an Indian businessperson and writer. He is the winner of the Sahitya Akademi Award in Konkani and is part of the Monginis group.

== Early life ==
Datta Damodar Naik was born on 30 December 1954. He graduated with a degree in mathematics.

== Career ==
=== Business ===
Naik inherited the family's old, dying business of importing confectionery and biscuits. He and his son now run New Millennium Bakers that produces Monginis products. They also run businesses in organic farming, logistics, real estate (Commonwealth Developers) and hospitality.

=== Writing ===
Naik's first book was a socio-economic study of Canacon, followed by another on Valpoi, in 1973. He won the Sahitya Akademi Award for Konkani in 2006.

Naik has also published regular columns in Marathi publications like Sadhana and Antaarnad.

After releasing many books in Konkani and Marathi, in 2015, he released his first book in English, Uncommon Wealth – A Modern Day Panchatantra. The book is targeted towards children.

Controversies

In 2025, an FIR was registered against him after a derogatory remark on temple priests.

In July 2026, a row erupted over an article on Shenoi Goembab written by him, leading to the withdrawal of his 1 crore donation to Konkani Bhasha Mandal and his resignation from the organisation, which was rejected.

== Awards and accolades ==
Naik was awarded the 2016 Sahitya Akademi Award in Konkani for his book, Jai ki Jui.

In January 2025, to celebrate his 70th birthday, he was felicitated at a function by politician and writer Shashi Tharoor, who presented Naik with a painting by artist Subodh Kerkar.

== Personal life ==
Naik is based in Margao. He is also a philanthropist and donated a sum of rupees one crore to the Konkani Bhasha Mandal. He is an atheist.

He is a Saraswat Brahmin but has been vocal about his anti-caste opinions on multiple occasions. He thus started the Samata Andolan, a movement to work against Saraswat organization. He has also been accused of hurting religious sentiments.

Naik was also part of organisations and civil society movements such as Lokshakti. He also founded and convened the Dakshinayan Abhiyan in Goa.
