= 2025–26 Goa Professional League =

32nd season of the Goa Pro League

Goa Professional League
- Season: 2025–26
- Dates: 18 September 2025–1 May 2026
- Champions: Sporting Clube de Goa; 9th GPL title 9th Goan title
- Promoted: Clube de Salgaocar
- Relegated: Churchill Brothers; Guardian Angel
- Matches: 154
- Goals: 435 (2.82 per match)
- Highest scoring: Dempo 6-5 Chapora
- All statistics correct as of 22 April 2026.

The 2025–26 Goa Professional League is the 28th season of the Goa Professional League, the top football league in the Indian state of Goa since its establishment in 1996. Sporting Clube de Goa are the defending champions, having won their 8th title.

The Charity Match, the curtain-raiser to the Goa Pro league was held on 7 September 2025. It was contested between Sporting Clube de Goa and Dempo SC. Dempo won the match on shootouts.

== Changes from last season ==
=== Relegated from 2024–25 Goa Professional League ===
- Panjim Footballers

=== Promoted to 2025–26 Goa Professional League ===
==== From GFA First Division League ====
- Chapora Yuvak Sangh

==== Corporate entries ====
- Bidesh XI SC

On 12 March 2025, the GFA invited bids for a new team to participate in the tournament.

▲ to GPL	▼ to First Division
Chapora Yuvak Sangh; Bidesh XI SC	Panjim Footballers

== Club locations ==
Location of 2025–26 Goa Pro League teams

Club	Location	Ground
Dempo	Carambolim	Ella Academy Ground
Goa Police	Panaji	Duler Stadium
Sporting Clube de Goa	Panaji	Duler Stadium
Bidesh XI SC	Assonora	Duler Stadium
Chapora Yuvak Sangh	Chapora	Duler Stadium
FC Goa B	Porvorim	Duler Stadium
Calangute Association	Calangute	Duler Stadium
Geno Sports Club	Mapusa	Duler Stadium
SESA FA	Sanquelim	Sesa Academy Ground
Vasco	Vasco	Tilak Maidan
Clube de Salgaocar	Vasco	Tilak Maidan
Cortalim Villagers	Cortalim	Tilak Maidan
Pax of Nagoa	Nagoa	Nagoa Ground
Churchill Brothers	Margao	Benaulim Ground
Guardian Angel SC	Curchorem	Benaulim Ground

== Format ==
The 2025–26 Goa Professional League consists of 15 teams and will be played in two phases. In the first phase, all the teams will play each other once.

In the second, the top 8 teams play in the Super League and the team that finishes top of the table is declared the champion. The bottom 7 will play the relegation league and the team finishing last will be relegated to the 2026-27 First Division.

== Broadcasting ==
Matches from the league were telecast live on the SportsCast India YouTube channel.

== Controversies ==
In February 2026, The GFA issued chargesheet to 14 footballers, mostly from Chapora Yuvak Sangh, for their alleged match-fixing activities.

== Phase 1 ==
Pos	Team	Pld	W	D	L	GF	GA	GD	Pts	Qualification
1	Sporting Goa	14	10	3	1	32	7	+25	33	Super League
2	Salgaocar	14	9	4	1	27	10	+17	31	Super League
3	Geno SC	14	9	3	2	27	15	+12	30	Super League
4	Dempo	14	8	5	1	25	15	+10	29	Super League
5	FC Goa B	14	8	2	4	29	12	+17	26	Super League
6	SESA	14	5	5	4	13	11	+2	20	Super League
7	Calangute	14	6	2	6	22	19	+3	20	Super League
8	Chapora YS	14	6	1	7	25	29	−4	19	Super League
9	Goa Police	14	5	4	5	25	20	+5	19	Relegation League
10	Pax of Nagoa	14	4	2	8	16	21	−5	14	Relegation League
11	Cortalim Villagers	14	2	7	5	9	20	−11	13	Relegation League
12	Vasco	14	3	4	7	14	31	−17	13	Relegation League
13	Churchill Brothers	14	3	3	8	13	21	−8	12	Relegation League
14	Guardian Angel	14	2	1	11	12	33	−21	7	Relegation League
15	Bidesh SC	14	0	4	10	6	31	−25	4	Relegation League

Source: Goa Professional League Official The Away End - Goa Pro League
Rules for classification: 1) points; 2) head-to-head; 3) goal difference; 3) goals scored

=== Fixtures ===
Home \ Away	SCG	SAL	GEN	DEM	FCG	SES	CAL	CHA	POL	PXN	COR	VSC	CHB	GUA	BSC
Sporting Goa	—		0–0				2–0			2–0	3–0	3–1		3–2	7–0
Salgaocar	0–4	—	3–1		0–0		3–2			1–0			4–0	4–0	
Geno			—	0–0			2–1			1–0	2–2	3–1		6–1	3–0
Dempo	1–1	0–2		—	2–0	1–1		6–5					2–1		
FC Goa B	2–1		2–3		—		2–0			2–0		5–0		5–0	2–0
SESA	0–0	1–1	0–1		1–0	—		3–2		0–1			1–1		
Calangute				0–2		1–2	—		2–2		3–0	2–0		2–1	0–0
Chapora YS	0–3	1–2	3–1		3–2		1–3	—		3–2			0–3		
Goa Police	0–1	0–0	1–2	1–2	2–2	2–1		1–3	—				1–0		
Pax of Nagoa				1–3			2–5		3–1	—	1–1	2–0		3–0	0–0
Cortalim		0–0		0–0	0–3	1–0		0–1	0–3		—		1–1		
Vasco		1–5		0–0		0–0		1–0	1–7		2–2	—	2–2		
Churchill	1–2		1–2		0–2		0–1			2–1			—	0–2	1–0
Guardian Angel				2–3		0–2		0–1	1–2		0–0	0–2		—	3–0
Bidesh		0–2		1–3		0–1		2–2	2–2		1–2	0–3			—

Source: The Away End - Goa Pro League
Legend: Blue = home team win; Yellow = draw; Red = away team win.

== Phase 2 ==
All the points from Phase 1 are carried over to Phase 2.

=== Super League ===
Indian Super League, Indian Football League, I-League 2, I-League 3, and institutional teams are ineligible for 2026–27 I-League 3.

Pos	Team	Pld	W	D	L	GF	GA	GD	Pts	Qualification
1	Sporting Goa^{IL2}	21	14	5	2	44	13	+31	47	Champions
2	Dempo^{IFL}	21	12	8	1	44	21	+23	44	
3	Salgaocar^{IL3}	21	12	7	2	41	22	+19	43	Eligible for I-League 3
4	FC Goa B^{ISL}	21	12	3	6	39	23	+16	39	
5	Geno SC	21	10	4	7	35	25	+10	34	
6	Calangute	21	9	5	7	36	31	+5	32	
7	SESA	21	7	6	8	19	20	−1	27	
8	Chapora YS	21	6	1	14	29	50	−21	19	

Source: Goa Professional League Official The Away End - Goa Pro League
Rules for classification: 1) points; 2) goal difference; 3) number of goals scored

=== Fixtures ===
Home \ Away	SCG	SAL	GEN	DEM	FCG	SES	CAL	CHA
Sporting Goa	—	1–1		2–2	1–2	1–0		3–0
CD Salgaocar		—		0–4		3–0	4–4	3–1
Geno SC	0–1	0–1	—		1–2	0–2		5–1
Dempo			2–1	—			3–3	
FC Goa B		2–2		0–4	—	2–1		2–1
SESA				0–0		—	1–2	
Calangute	1–3		1–1		1–0		—	2–0
Chapora YS				0–4		1–2		—

Source: The Away End - Goa Pro League
Legend: Blue = home team win; Yellow = draw; Red = away team win.

=== Relegation League ===
Pos	Team	Pld	W	D	L	GF	GA	GD	Pts	Qualification
1	Goa Police	20	7	4	9	32	30	+2	25	
2	Pax of Nagoa	20	7	4	9	26	25	+1	25	
3	Cortalim Villagers	20	4	11	5	19	25	−6	23	
4	Vasco	20	6	5	9	20	36	−16	23	
5	Churchill Brothers	20	5	5	10	24	26	−2	20	Relegation to First Division
6	Guardian Angel	20	5	4	11	20	37	−17	19	Relegation to First Division
7	Bidesh SC (Note: Direct entrants Bidesh XI are immune from relegation this season.)	20	0	4	16	7	51	−44	4	

Source: Goa Professional League Official The Away End - Goa Pro League
Rules for classification: 1) points; 2) goal difference; 3) number of goals scored

=== Fixtures ===
Home \ Away	POL	PXN	COR	VSC	CHB	GUA	BSC
Goa Police	—	0–5	0–3	0–1		0–1	6–0
Pax of Nagoa		—			0–1		
Cortalim Villagers		2–2	—	0–0		1–1	2–0
Vasco		0–1		—			2–0
Churchill Brothers	0–1		2–2	1–2	—		
Guardian Angel		1–1		3–1	0–0	—	
Bidesh SC		0–1			0–7	1–2	—

Source: The Away End - Goa Pro League
Legend: Blue = home team win; Yellow = draw; Red = away team win.

== Prize money ==
The total pool of prize money is ₹10 lakh (US$10,000)

Position	Amount
Champions	₹6 lakh (US$6,300)
Runner-ups	₹4 lakh (US$4,200)
Total	₹10 lakh (US$10,000)

== See also ==
- 2025–26 I-League 3
- 2025–26 Indian State Leagues
