= 2024–25 Goa Professional League =

32nd season of the Goa Pro League

Goa Professional League
- Season: 2024–25
- Dates: 21 September 2024–2 May 2025
- Champions: Sporting Goa; 8th GPL title 8th Goan title
- Promoted: CD Salgaocar
- Relegated: Panjim Footballers
- Matches played: 134
- Goals scored: 441 (3.29 per match)
- Highest scoring: Sporting Goa 8–2 Guardian Angel (14 January 2025); Sporting Goa 8–2 Goa Police (30 April 2025)

The 2024–25 Goa Professional League is the 27th season of the Goa Professional League, the top football league in the Indian state of Goa since its establishment in 1996. Sporting Clube de Goa are the defending champions, having won their 7th title. 14 clubs are participating, with most matches played at Duler Stadium.

== Changes from last season ==
=== Relegated from 2023–24 Goa Professional League ===
- Young Boys of Tonca

=== Promoted to 2024–25 Goa Professional League ===
==== From GFA First Division League ====
- Goa Police

==== Corporate entries ====
- Clube de Salgaocar

Before the 2023–24 Goa Professional League season, The Goa Football Association (GFA) opened slots for direct entries into the league. The entry fees were 50 and 30 lakhs for corporate and village clubs respectively. Corporate entry clubs are exempt from relegation for the first season, ensuring a minimum of two years in the top tier. The third team handed a direct entry is owned by Dattaraj V Salgaocar, former co-owner of FC Goa and now chairman of VMS corporation.

▲ to GPL	▼ to First Division
Goa Police; Clube de Salgaocar	Young Boys of Tonca

== Club locations ==
Location of 2024–25 Goa Pro League teams

Club	Location	Ground
Dempo	Carambolim	Ella Academy Ground
Panjim Footballers	Panaji	Duler Stadium
Goa Police	Panaji	Duler Stadium
Sporting Clube de Goa	Panaji	Duler Stadium
FC Goa B	Porvorim	Duler Stadium
Calangute Association	Calangute	Duler Stadium
Geno Sports Club	Mapusa	Duler Stadium
SESA FA	Sanquelim	Sesa Academy Ground
Vasco	Vasco	Tilak Maidan
Clube de Salgaocar	Vasco	Tilak Maidan
Cortalim Villagers	Cortalim	Tilak Maidan
Pax of Nagoa	Nagoa	Nagoa Ground
Churchill Brothers	Margao	Benaulim Ground
Guardian Angel SC	Curchorem	Benaulim Ground

== Format ==
The 2024–25 Goa Professional League consists of 14 teams and will be played in two phases. In the first phase, all the teams will play each other once.

In the second, the top 8 teams play in the Super League and the team that finishes top of the table is declared the champion. The bottom 6 will play the relegation league and the team finishing last is relegated to the 2025-26 First Division.

== Broadcasting ==
Matches from the league were telecast live on the SportsCast India YouTube channel.

== League table ==
=== Phase 1 ===
Pos	Team	Pld	W	D	L	GF	GA	GD	Pts	Qualification
1	Sporting Goa	13	11	1	1	39	13	+26	34	Super League
2	Dempo	13	9	2	2	27	9	+18	29	Super League
3	Geno SC	13	9	1	3	33	16	+17	28	Super League
4	SESA	13	8	4	1	24	9	+15	28	Super League
5	CD Salgaocar	13	8	3	2	23	10	+13	27	Super League
6	FC Goa B	13	7	0	6	28	17	+11	21	Super League
7	Cortalim Villagers	13	5	5	3	23	16	+7	20	Super League
8	Goa Police	13	6	1	6	21	25	−4	19	Super League
9	Pax of Nagoa	13	5	1	7	20	25	−5	16	Relegation League
10	Calangute Association	13	4	1	8	14	18	−4	13	Relegation League
11	Churchill Brothers	13	3	0	10	18	28	−10	9	Relegation League
12	Guardian Angel	13	2	2	9	15	32	−17	8	Relegation League
13	Panjim Footballers	13	1	2	10	11	48	−37	5	Relegation League
14	Vasco	13	1	1	11	9	39	−30	4	Relegation League

Source: Goa Professional League Official The Away End - Goa Pro League
Rules for classification: 1) points; 2) goal difference; 3) number of goals scored

=== Fixtures ===
Home \ Away	SCG	DEM	GEN	SES	SAL	FCG	COR	POL	PXN	CAL	CHB	GUA	PAN	VSC
Sporting Goa	—		3–1		2–3					3–1		8–2	4–1	6–0
Dempo	1–2	—					0–0	4–0		2–1	2–1		2–1	
Geno SC		2–1	—						4–1	2–0		2–1	5–1	
SESA	0–0	0–0	3–1	—	0–2		1–1	0–0	4–2			2–0		
CD Salgaocar		0–2	1–1		—	0–2	1–1		0–0		1–0	2–1		
FC Goa B	1–2	0–1	3–0	1–2	0–2	—		4–1	2–0			3–1		
Cortalim Villagers	0–2		2–3			3–2	—			1–0	2–3		2–2	2–0
Goa Police	1–2		0–2				1–4	—		2–1	3–1		0–3	3–2
Pax of Nagoa	1–3	1–3					0–4	1–4	—	2–0	3–1			
Calangute Association				0–1	0–3	2–0				—		2–1	4–0	1–1
Churchill Brothers	1–2		0–4	0–2		3–4				0–2	—		5–0	3–0
Guardian Angel		0–1					1–1	1–4	0–4		3–0	—		
Panjim Footballers				1–7	0–4	0–7			0–4			2–2	—	0–2
Vasco		1–8	0–6	1–2	1–4	0–1			0–1			1–2		—

Source: The Away End - Goa Pro League
Legend: Blue = home team win; Yellow = draw; Red = away team win.

=== Phase 2 ===
All the points from Phase 1 are carried over to Phase 2.

=== Super League ===
Indian Super League, I-League 2, I-League 3 and institutional teams are ineligible for 2025-26 I-League 3.

Pos	Team	Pld	W	D	L	GF	GA	GD	Pts	Qualification
1	Sporting Goa^{IL2}	20	14	4	2	52	19	+33	46	Champions
2	Dempo^{IL}	20	14	3	3	41	15	+26	45	
3	CD Salgaocar	20	12	5	3	39	16	+23	41	Eligible for I-League 3
4	Geno SC	20	11	3	6	42	26	+16	36	
5	FC Goa B^{ISL}	20	11	2	7	41	24	+17	35	
6	SESA^{IL3}	20	9	6	5	31	19	+12	33	
7	Cortalim Villagers	20	6	8	6	31	27	+4	26	
8	Goa Police^{INST}	20	6	2	12	25	52	−27	20	

Source: Goa Professional League Official The Away End - Goa Pro League
Rules for classification: 1) points; 2) goal difference; 3) number of goals scored

=== Fixtures ===
Home \ Away	SCG	DEM	SAL	GEN	SES	FCG	COR	POL
Sporting Goa	—		1–2					8–2
Dempo	0–0	—		1–0	3–2	1–2	2–1	5–0
CD Salgaocar		1–2	—	2–0			4–1	5–0
Geno SC	1–1			—			1–1	
SESA	1–1		0–0	1–2	—	0–2		2–0
FC Goa B	0–1		2–2	3–2		—		3–0
Cortalim Villagers	0–1				3–1	1–1	—	
Goa Police				1–3			1–1	—

Source: The Away End - Goa Pro League
Legend: Blue = home team win; Yellow = draw; Red = away team win.

=== Relegation League ===
Pos	Team	Pld	W	D	L	GF	GA	GD	Pts	Qualification
1	Pax of Nagoa	18	7	1	10	32	33	−1	22	
2	Calangute Association	18	6	1	11	19	24	−5	19	
3	Guardian Angel	18	5	4	9	26	37	−11	19	
4	Vasco	18	4	3	11	20	44	−24	15	
5	Churchill Brothers	18	4	2	12	23	36	−13	14	
6	Panjim Footballers (R)	18	2	2	14	19	68	−49	8	Relegation to First Division

Source: Goa Professional League Official The Away End - Goa Pro League
Rules for classification: 1) points; 2) goal difference; 3) number of goals scored
(R) Relegated

=== Fixtures ===
Home \ Away	PXN	CAL	GUA	VSC	CHB	PAN
Pax of Nagoa	—	0–1	2–4		3–0	
Calangute Association		—		0–1	3–1	1–2
Guardian Angel		2–0	—			3–1
Vasco	3–0		2–2	—		
Churchill Brothers			0–0	0–0	—	4–2
Panjim Footballers	0–7			3–5		—

Source: The Away End - Goa Pro League
Legend: Blue = home team win; Yellow = draw; Red = away team win.

== Prize money ==
The total pool of prize money is ₹10 lakh (US$12,000)

Position	Amount
Champions	₹6 lakh (US$7,100)
Runner-ups	₹4 lakh (US$4,700)
Total	₹10 lakh (US$12,000)

== See also ==
- 2024–25 I-League 3
- 2024–25 Indian State Leagues
- 2024 Bandodkar Trophy
