= 2024 Bandodkar Trophy =

Bhausaheb Bandodkar Memorial Trophy

Tournament details
- Country: India
- Venue: South Goa
- Dates: Qualifying: 10 – 21 August; Competition proper: 24 August – 6 September
- Teams: 8

Final positions
- Champions: Goa (2nd title)
- Runners-up: Odisha

Tournament statistics
- Matches played: 15
- Goals scored: 47 (3.13 per match)
- Top goal scorer(s): Armando Sadiku (6 goals)

The 2024 Bandodkar Trophy (also known as 2024 Bhausaheb Bandodkar Memorial Trophy) was the 23rd edition of Bandodkar Trophy and the 2nd since its revival, hosted by the Goa Football Association.

The tournament featured eight clubs, including the Indian Super League, the I-League, the Goa Pro League, and international invitees from the A-League Men and the Argentine Primera División. The matches were broadcast on Sportscast India YouTube channel and FIFA+.

== Teams ==
| Team | Head coach | Captain | Location |
Indian Super League teams
| Chennaiyin | (Scotland) Owen Coyle | (England) Ryan Edwards | Chennai, Tamil Nadu |
| Odisha | (Spain) Sergio Lobera | (India) Amrinder Singh | Bhubaneswar, Odisha |
| Goa | (Spain) Manolo Márquez | (India) Seriton Fernandes | Margao, Goa |
I-League teams
| Churchill Brothers | (India) Vaman Rohidas Chari | (India) Lesly Rebello | Margao, Goa |
| Dempo | (India) Samir Naik | (India) Ariston Costa | Panaji, Goa |
I-League 2 team (GPL Qualifier)
| Sporting Goa | (India) Armando Colaco | (India) Marcus Masceranhas | Panaji, Goa |
Foreign teams
| (Australia) Brisbane Roar | (Australia) Ruben Zadkovich | (Australia) Joe Caletti | Brisbane, Queensland |
| (Argentina) Defensa y Justicia | (Argentina) Ángel Candia | (Argentina) Pedro Bormida | Florencio Varela, Buenos Aires |

== Qualifiers ==
=== Preliminary qualifier ===
| Team 1 | Score | Team 2 |
|---|---|---|
| Guardian Angel (India) | 0–0 | (India) CD Salgaocar |
| Pax of Nagoa (India) | 3–2 | (India) Cortalim Villagers |
| Sesa (India) | 5–0 | (India) Guardian Angel |
| Goa Police (India) | 0–0 | (India) Pax of Nagoa |
| Clube de Salgaocar (India) | 1–0 | (India) Sesa |
| Cortalim Villagers (India) | 1–2 | (India) Goa Police |

Source: GFA

=== Final qualifier ===
| Team 1 | Score | Team 2 |
|---|---|---|
| Sporting Goa (India) | 0–0 | (India) CD Salgaocar |
| Pax of Nagoa (India) | 1–4 | (India) Sporting Goa |
| CD Salgaocar (India) | 0–0 | (India) Pax of Nagoa |

Source: GFA

== Venues ==
| Margao | 2024 Bandodkar Trophy is located in Goa |
|---|---|
| Fatorda Stadium; Ella Ground | 2024 Bandodkar Trophy is located in Goa |
| Capacity: 19,000 | 2024 Bandodkar Trophy is located in Goa |
| Aerial view Sree Kanteerava Stadium | 2024 Bandodkar Trophy is located in Goa |

== Group stage ==
=== Group A ===
| Pos | Team | Pld | W | D | L | GF | GA | GD | Pts | Qualification | (India) GOA | (Australia) BRI | (India) DMP | (India) SPG |
|---|---|---|---|---|---|---|---|---|---|---|---|---|---|---|
| 1 | (India) Goa | 3 | 3 | 0 | 0 | 7 | 1 | +6 | 9 | Advance to knockout stage | — | — | — | 4–0 |
| 2 | (Australia) Brisbane Roar | 3 | 2 | 0 | 1 | 7 | 2 | +5 | 6 | Advance to knockout stage | 0–1 | — | — | 2–0 |
| 3 | (India) Dempo | 3 | 1 | 0 | 2 | 4 | 8 | −4 | 3 | | 1–2 | 1–5 | — | — |
| 4 | (India) Sporting Goa | 3 | 0 | 0 | 3 | 1 | 8 | −7 | 0 | | — | — | 1–2 | — |

Source: GFA
24 August 2024
16:00 IST

| Goa (India) | 4–0 | (India) Sporting Goa |
|---|---|---|
| Herrera 55', 61'; Sadiku 83'; Thangjam 89' | Report |

24 August 2024
19:00 IST

| Dempo (India) | 1–5 | (Australia) Brisbane Roar |
|---|---|---|
| Pires 80' | Report | Waddingham 47', 59'; Shour 63'; O'Shea 69'; Lofthouse 75' |

27 August 2024
16:00 IST

| Sporting Goa (India) | 1–2 | (India) Dempo |
|---|---|---|
| Alves 21' | Report | Hoble 32'; Rawat 73' |

27 August 2024
19:00 IST

| Brisbane Roar (Australia) | 0–1 | (India) Goa |
|---|---|---|
| | Report | Sadiku 51' |

30 August 2024
16:00 IST

| Brisbane Roar (Australia) | 2–0 | (India) Sporting Goa |
|---|---|---|
| Zabala 40'; Van Der Saag 45+4' | Report |

30 August 2024
19:00 IST

| Dempo (India) | 1–2 | (India) Goa |
|---|---|---|
| Rawat 58' | Report | Sadiku 17'; Chhetri 60' |

=== Group B ===
| Pos | Team | Pld | W | D | L | GF | GA | GD | Pts | Qualification | (India) ODI | (Argentina) DYJ | (India) CHN | (India) CBR |
|---|---|---|---|---|---|---|---|---|---|---|---|---|---|---|
| 1 | (India) Odisha | 3 | 3 | 0 | 0 | 9 | 1 | +8 | 9 | Advance to knockout stage | — | 2–1 | 1–0 | 6–0 |
| 2 | (Argentina) Defensa y Justicia | 3 | 2 | 0 | 1 | 4 | 2 | +2 | 6 | Advance to knockout stage | 1–2 | — | 2–0 | 1–0 |
| 3 | (India) Chennaiyin | 3 | 1 | 0 | 2 | 4 | 4 | 0 | 3 | | 0–1 | 0–2 | — | 4–1 |
| 4 | (India) Churchill Brothers | 3 | 0 | 0 | 3 | 1 | 11 | −10 | 0 | | 0–6 | 0–1 | 1–4 | — |

Source: GFA
25 August 2024
16:00 IST

| Churchill (India) | 1–4 | (India) Chennaiyin |
|---|---|---|
| Diamande 19' | Report | Elsinho 12'; Jordán 31'; Singh 44'; Yadwad 65' |

Referee: Mario Pereira
25 August 2024
21:00 IST

| Odisha (India) | 2–1 | (Argentina) Defensa y Justicia |
|---|---|---|
| Raynier 68'; Delgado 79' | Report | Cruz 48' |

28 August 2024
16:00 IST

| Defensa y Justicia (Argentina) | 1–0 | (India) Churchill |
|---|---|---|
| Anthony 35' | Report |

28 August 2024
19:00 IST

| Odisha (India) | 1–0 | (India) Chennaiyin |
|---|---|---|
| Mauricio 40' (pen.) | Report |

Referee: David Rebello

31 August 2024
16:00 IST

| Churchill (India) | 0–6 | (India) Odisha |
|---|---|---|
| | Report | Krishna 21', 30', 36'; Aphaoba 43'; Mawihmingthanga 86', 90' |

31 August 2024
19:00 IST

| Chennaiyin (India) | 0–2 | (Argentina) Defensa y Justicia |
|---|---|---|
| | Report | Bohiler 14'; Valdez 45+4' |

== Knockout stage ==
Semifinals
A1 | (India) Goa | 1
B2 | (Argentina) Defensa y Justicia | 0
B1 | (India) Odisha | '2
A2 | (Australia) Brisbane Roar | 1

Final
A1 | (India) Goa (p) | 3 (3)
B1 | (India) Odisha | 3 (1)

=== Semi-finals ===
3 September 2024
16:00 IST

| Goa (India) | 1–0 | (Argentina) Defensa y Justicia |
|---|---|---|
| Sadiku 39' | Report |

Fatorda Stadium, Margao
Referee: David Rebello

3 September 2024
19:00 IST

| Odisha (India) | 2–1 | (Australia) Brisbane Roar |
|---|---|---|
| Boumous 16', 61' | Report | Waddingham 66' |

Fatorda Stadium, Margao
Referee: Sunil Nanodkar

=== Final ===
6 September 2024
19:00 IST

| Goa (India) | 3–3 | (India) Odisha |
|---|---|---|
| Sadiku 34' (pen.), 88'; Drazic 41' | Report | Boumous 18'; Jahouh 49' (pen.); Ali 55' |
Penalties
| Sadiku (penalty scored); Herrera (penalty scored); Drazic (penalty scored) | 3–1 | (penalty scored) Mauricio; (penalty missed) Jahouh; (penalty missed) Boumous; (penalty missed) Delgado |

Fatorda Stadium, Margao
Referee: Tejas Nagvenkar

== Awards ==
The total pool of prize money is:

| Position | Club | Amount |
|---|---|---|
| Champions | (India) Goa | ₹15 lakh (US$16,000) |
| Runners-up | (India) Odisha | ₹8 lakh (US$8,500) |
| Total | | ₹23 lakh (US$25,000) |
