= 2023–24 Goa Professional League =

32nd season of the Goa Pro League

Goa Professional League
- Season: 2023–24
- Dates: 27 August 2023–1 May 2024
- Champions: Sporting Goa; 7th GPL title 7th Goan title
- Promoted: SESA
- Relegated: Young Boys of Tonca
- Matches: 156
- Goals: 459 (2.94 per match)
- Highest scoring: Calangute Association 3-6 FC Goa (20 January 2024)
- Longest winless run: 21 matches Young Boys of Tonca
- All statistics correct as of 1 May 2024.

The 2023–24 Goa Professional League, also known as the CAM Goa Professional League for sponsorship reasons, was the 26th season of the Goa Professional League, the top football league in the Indian state of Goa since its establishment in 1996. Dempo SC were the defending champions, having won back-to-back titles.

== Changes from last season ==
- This season, instead of fielding two U-20 players, GPL clubs will now feature two U-21 players who must collectively play a full 90 minutes.
- Players accumulating five yellow cards will serve a one-match suspension, with subsequent yellow card counts leading to progressively reduced suspensions.
- GPL matches will be spread across Goa. Alternative venues are being explored, with clubs encouraged to propose potential grounds for inspection and approval.

=== Relegated from 2022–23 Goa Professional League ===
- Velsao SCC
- Salgaocar FC (Note: Salgaocar were not relegated, but instead, they voluntarily shut down their senior team operations. They will continue to field under-13 and under-15 youth teams.)

=== Promoted to 2023–24 Goa Professional League ===
==== From GFA First Division League ====
- Young Boys of Tonca
- Cortalim Villagers

==== Corporate entries ====
- Pax of Nagoa SC
- Geno Sports Club

The Goa Football Association (GFA) opened slots for direct entries for the Goa Professional League (GPL) 2023-24 from village clubs and corporates. The entry fees were 50 and 30 lakhs for corporate and village clubs. Corporate entry clubs are exempt from relegation for the first season, ensuring a minimum of two years in the top tier.

▲ to GPL	▼ out of GPL
Young Boys of Tonca; Cortalim Villagers; Pax of Nagoa; Geno Sports Club	Velsao SCC; Salgaocar FC

== Club locations ==
Location of 2023–24 Goa Pro League teams

Club	Location	Ground
Dempo	Carambolim	Ella Ground
Panjim Footballers	Panaji	Ella Ground
Young Boys of Tonca	Caranzalem	Ella Ground
Sporting Goa	Panaji	Tilak Maidan
FC Goa B	Porvorim	Duler Stadium; Sesa Ground
Calangute Association	Calangute	Duler Stadium; Sesa Ground
SESA FA	Sanquelim	Duler Stadium; Sesa Ground
Geno Sports Club	Mapusa	Duler Stadium; Sesa Ground
Vasco	Vasco	Nagoa Ground
Cortalim Villagers	Cortalim	Nagoa Ground
Pax of Nagoa	Verna	Nagoa Ground
Churchill Brothers	Margao	Rosary Ground
Guardian Angel SC	Curchorem	Rosary Ground

=== Stadiums ===
Matches will initially be played at Duler Stadium in Mapusa. However, with the league adopting a home-and-away format, other venues were added. They include Ella Ground, Old Goa; Rosary Ground, Benaulim; and Nagoa Ground, Verna.

== League table ==
Pos	Team	Pld	W	D	L	GF	GA	GD	Pts	Qualification
1	Sporting Goa (C)	24	15	4	5	54	16	+38	49	
2	SESA	24	15	3	6	55	24	+31	48	Eligible for 2024-25 I-League 3 (Note: Since Sporting Goa and Dempo have already qualified for I-League 2 and I-League respectively, the next highest ranked team(s) are eligible for I-League 3.)
3	Dempo	24	13	7	4	43	21	+22	46	
4	Pax of Nagoa	24	13	5	6	46	22	+24	44	
5	FC Goa B	24	11	6	7	46	22	+24	39	
6	Cortalim Villagers	24	11	6	7	34	25	+9	39	
7	Geno SC	24	11	6	7	33	26	+7	39	
8	Calangute Association	24	10	4	10	40	33	+7	34	
9	Churchill Brothers	24	7	8	9	30	32	−2	29	
10	Guardian Angel	24	7	8	9	27	39	−12	29	
11	Vasco	24	6	4	14	22	49	−27	22	
12	Panjim Footballers	24	1	6	17	16	59	−43	9	
13	Young Boys of Tonca (R)	24	1	3	20	13	91	−78	6	Relegation to GFA First Division League

Source: Goa Professional League Official The Away End - Goa Pro League
Rules for classification: 1) points; 2) goal difference; 3) number of goals scored
(C) Champions; (R) Relegated

=== Prize money ===
The total pool of prize money is ₹10 lakh (US$12,000).

Position	Amount
Champions	₹6 lakh (US$7,100)
Runner-ups	₹4 lakh (US$4,700)
Total	₹10 lakh (US$12,000)

== See also ==
- 2023–24 I-League 3
- 2023–24 Indian State Leagues
