= Goa Police Cup =

Annual football tournament organized by the Goa Police Sports Cell

- Organiser(s): Goa Football Association
- Founded: 1968; 58 years ago
- Teams: 12
- Current champions: Cortalim Villagers
- Broadcaster: SportsCast India (YouTube)
- 2026

The Goa Police Cup is an annual football tournament organized by the Sports Cell of Goa Police. The tournament is played between the top teams of Goa Professional League and GFA First Division League, sometimes joined by invitational teams. Goa Police Cup is one of the oldest tournaments in Goa, starting since 1968. The competition is played in a group stage followed by knockout. Vasco won the inaugural edition. The champions in 2023 edition were Cortalim Villagers.

== Prize ==
The winner of the Goa Police Cup gets a cash prize of Rupees 2 lakh, and the runners up gets 1 lakh. The Goa Police Football Cup has a history of being one of the oldest football tournaments in the country with a 5-feet 5 inches silverware trophy, donated by Shantillal Gosalia, being awarded to the winners.

== Teams ==
The following teams participated in the 2026 edition.

Club
Bidesh XI SC
Calangute Association
Chapora Yuvak Sangh
Churchill Brothers
Clube de Salgaocar
Cortalim Villagers SWSC
Dempo
FC Goa (R)
Goa Police SC
Geno SC
Guardian Angel
Pax of Nagoa
Sesa
Sporting Goa
Vasco

== Venues ==
The tournament is played at Duler, Raia, Cuncolim and Ambelim.

== Results ==
Edition	Year	Winners	Score	Runners-up	Ref
	1968	Vasco	1–0	Margao CC	
	1969	Vasco			
	1970	Sesa		Salgaocar	
	1977	Vasco			
	1978	Salgaocar			
	1999	Churchill Brothers	2–1	Dempo	
	2005	Dempo	3–1	Sporting Goa	
12th	2010	Vasco	1–0	Sporting Goa	
13th	2015	Laxmi Prasad	5–2	Salgaocar	
14th	2016	FC Bardez	3–0	Calangute Association	
15th	2018	Sporting Goa	3–1	Churchill Brothers	
16th	2019	Goa	1–1 (7–6 p)	Sporting Goa	
17th	2021	Panjim Footballers	1–0	Dempo	
18th	2022	Sesa FA	2–1	Chapora Yuvak Sangh	
19th	2023	Cortalim Villagers	0–0 (4–2 p)	Dempo	
20th	2026	Geno FC	1–0	Calangute Association	
