= 2020–21 Goa Professional League =

Goa Professional League
- Season: 2020–21
- Champions: Sporting Clube de Goa; 6th GPL title 6th Goan title
- Matches: 66
- Goals: 176 (2.67 per match)
- Top goalscorer: Marcus Masceranhas
- Best goalkeeper: Ozen Silva
- Biggest win: 9 - 0 (Sporting vs Guardian Angel), 30 April 2021
- Highest scoring: 9 - 0 (Sporting vs Guardian Angel), 30 April 2021
- Longest winning run: Sporting (4)
- Longest unbeaten run: Sporting (11)
- Longest winless run: Guardian Angel (8)
- Longest losing run: Velsao; Guardian Angel (4)

The 2020–21 Goa Professional League was the 23rd season of the Goa Professional League, the top football league in the Indian state of Goa, since its establishment in 1996. The league season commenced on 27 January 2021.

Selvel Advertising Pvt Ltd is the title sponsor of Goa Professional League 2020-21 season. The Kolkata based media firm has signed a five-year deal with the state association for the sponsorship.

This season, the GPL was played with 12 teams in a single leg, which will have 66 matches and all of them will broadcast on an OTT app and will also have Square Circle as digital partners. The matches of the league were played at Duler Stadium, Mapusa, through to the end of April 2021.

Sporting Clube de Goa and Churchill Brothers were defending champions as the 13 remaining games could not be played last season due to the COVID-19 pandemic and the remaining teams wouldn't have topped the league even if they had played.

== Teams ==
Bases

== Format ==
The competition has been cut short to single-leg fixtures across three months, as opposed to the two-legged system that was in place till the last season. Every team will face all the other teams once each and the side that finishes at the top spot on the points table at the end of the league will be declared champions.

== Rules to note ==
- The team standing last in the league shall be demoted to GFA First Division season 2021–22.
- Only three substitutions per team will be allowed in each match. A maximum of seven substitutes will be allowed on the bench.
- A minimum of two U-20 players of Goan origin have to be present in the starting XI of both teams in each match.
- Only two foreign players can be fielded per match.

== Standings ==
Pos	Team	Pld	W	D	L	GF	GA	GD	Pts	Qualification or relegation
1	Sporting Goa	11	6	5	0	30	8	+22	23	Champions
2	Dempo	11	6	3	2	24	12	+12	21	
3	Salgaocar	11	6	2	3	20	6	+14	20	
4	Calangute Association	11	6	2	3	16	13	+3	20	
5	FC Goa Reserves	11	4	4	3	13	11	+2	16	
6	Vasco	11	5	1	5	11	12	−1	16	
7	Churchill Brothers	11	4	3	4	12	18	−6	15	
8	Youth Club of Manora	11	3	2	6	9	15	−6	11	
9	Panjim Footballers	11	3	1	7	8	17	−9	10	
10	Guardian Angel	11	2	4	5	14	25	−11	10	
11	Velsao Sports & Cultural Club	11	2	2	7	8	22	−14	8	
12	SESA Football Academy*	11	2	5	4	11	17	−6	11	Relegation to the First Division

Updated to match(es) played on 30 April 2021. Source:
Rules for classification: 1) points; 2) goal difference; 3) number of goals scored
- Six points have been deducted of SESA Football Academy as they fielded an ineligible player in two of their games.

== Matches ==
=== Round 1 ===
27 January 2021	FC Goa Reserves	0–2	Salgaocar	Mapusa
			Saeesh Halarnkar 38' (pen.); Stephen Satarkar 90'	Stadium: Duler Stadium

28 January 2021	Guardian Angel	1–0	Panjim Footballers	Mapusa
	Beneston Barreto 45+1'			Stadium: Duler Stadium

29 January 2021	Velsao SCC	0–2	Calangute Association	Mapusa
			Kouame Kossonou 26'; Sidharth Kundaikar 85'	Stadium: Duler Stadium

30 January 2021	Churchill Brothers	0–2	Vasco	Mapusa
			Joaquim Abranches 9'; Mathew Colaco 69'	Stadium: Duler Stadium

14 February 2021	YC Manora	0 - 1	Sporting Clube de Goa	Mapusa
			Marcus Masceranhas 84'	Stadium: Duler Stadium

1 February 2021	Dempo	4 - 1	Sesa Football Academy	Mapusa
	Beevan D'Mello 9'; Uttam Rai 45+1, 83'; Gaurav Vaigankar 80'		Kunal Salgaonkar 53'	Stadium: Duler Stadium

=== Round 2 ===
2 February 2021	Salgaocar	5 - 0	Churchill Brothers	Mapusa
	Stephen Satarkar 63, 76, 79'; Steflon D'Costa 84'; Fhezer Gomes 88'			Stadium: Duler Stadium

3 February 2021	Sporting Clube de Goa	1 - 0	Vasco	Mapusa
	Dattaraj Gaonkar 45+2'			Stadium: Duler Stadium

4 February 2021	Calangute Association	1 - 2	FC Goa Reserves	Mapusa
	Jirjar Terang 36'		Aaren D'Silva 80, 88'	Stadium: Duler Stadium

5 February 2021	Sesa Football Academy	1 - 1	Velsao SCC	Mapusa
	Viraj Naik 57' (own goal)		Klusner Pereira 32'	Stadium: Duler Stadium

6 February 2021	Guardian Angel	2 - 2	Dempo	Mapusa
	Jovial Dias 15'; Joel Barreto 90+6'		Shallum Pires 58'; Leny Fernandes 78' (own goal)	Stadium: Duler Stadium

7 February 2021	Panjim Footballers	1 - 0	YC Manora	Mapusa
	Chandan Gawas 48'			Stadium: Duler Stadium

=== Round 3 ===
8 February 2021	Salgaocar	3 - 0	Velsao SCC	Mapusa
	Stephen Satarkar 39, 78'; Valentino Nazareth 87'			Stadium: Duler Stadium

9 February 2021	Dempo	1 - 2	FC Goa Reserves	Mapusa
	Darrel Mascarenhas 68'		Vasim Inamdar 43'; HP Lalremruata 63'	Stadium: Duler Stadium

10 February 2021	Churchill Brothers	1 - 0	Panjim Footballers	Mapusa
	Rakesh Das 41'			Stadium: Duler Stadium

11 February 2021	Guardian Angel	1 - 1	YC Manora	Mapusa
	Mevan Dias 90+2'		Nicholas Fernandes 19'	Stadium: Duler Stadium

12 February 2021	Vasco	1 - 0	Sesa Football Academy	Mapusa
	Joaquim Abranches 86'			Stadium: Duler Stadium

28 March 2021	Sporting Clube de Goa	2 - 2	Calangute Association	Mapusa
	Philip Odogwu 39'; Marcus Masceranhas 66'		Sidharth Kundaikar 53, 90+6'	Stadium: Duler Stadium

=== Round 4 ===
19 February 2021	FC Goa Reserves	2 - 0	Velsao SCC	Mapusa
	Romeo Fernandes 60'; Kapil Hoble 90+7'			Stadium: Duler Stadium

20 February 2021	Dempo	2 - 0	Churchill Brothers	Mapusa
	Richard Cardozo 6'; Gaurav Vaigankar 40'			Stadium: Duler Stadium

21 February 2021	Vasco	2 - 0	Guardian Angel	Mapusa
	Anil Gaonkar 45+3, 68'			Stadium: Duler Stadium

3 April 2021	Sporting Clube de Goa	5 - 0	Panjim Footballers	Mapusa
	Marcus Masceranhas 19'; Akeraj Martins 40, 45+2'; Philip Odogwu 50'; Gourav Kankonkar 68'			Stadium: Duler Stadium

26 April 2021	Sesa Football Academy	0 - 3	Salgaocar	Mapusa
		walkover		Stadium: Duler Stadium

24 February 2021	Calangute Association	1 - 2	YC Manora	Mapusa
	Rohan Pednekar 75'		Nicholas Fernandes 32'; Jeh Williamson 73'	Stadium: Duler Stadium

=== Round 5 ===
26 February 2021	Panjim Footballers	1 - 0	FC Goa Reserves	Mapusa
	Prasil Kankonkar 26'			Stadium: Duler Stadium

27 February 2021	Guardian Angel	2 - 3	Calangute Association	Mapusa
	Basanta Singh 54'; Gilbert Oliveira 81'		Siddhant Shirodkar 3, 46' Krishnanath Shirodkar 90+4'	Stadium: Duler Stadium

28 February 2021	Vasco	3 - 2	Velsao SCC	Mapusa
	Desmon Gama 8'; Denil Rebello 18'; Anil Gaonkar 65'		Ronil Azavedo 4'; Brian Mascarenhas 90+2'	Stadium: Duler Stadium

1 March 2021	Salgaocar	0 - 0	Dempo	Mapusa
				Stadium: Duler Stadium

12 April 2021	Sesa Football Academy	3 - 2	YC Manora	Mapusa
	Sameer Kashyap 6'; Suraj 35'; Rizbon Fernandes 37'		Sweden Barbosa 20'; Eldon Colaco 22'	Stadium: Duler Stadium

3 March 2021	Sporting Clube de Goa	2 - 0	Churchill Brothers	Mapusa
	Philip Odogwu 70'; Allen Fernandes 87' (own goal)			Stadium: Duler Stadium

=== Round 6 ===
4 March 2021	Dempo	3 - 1	Panjim Footballers	Mapusa
	Beevan D'Mello 56, 58'; Pedro Gonsalves 78'		Lloyd Cardozo 45'	Stadium: Duler Stadium

28 March 2021	FC Goa Reserves	1 - 1	Guardian Angel	Mapusa
	Joybert Almeida 69'		Joel Barreto 87'	Stadium: Duler Stadium

6 March 2021	Calangute Association	1 - 0	Vasco	Mapusa
	Kouame Kossonou 60'			Stadium: Duler Stadium

7 March 2021	Sporting Clube de Goa	4 - 0	Velsao SCC	Mapusa
	Philip Odogwu 10'; Rohit Totad 30'; Marcus Masceranhas 57'; Sachidanand Satelkar 66'			Stadium: Duler Stadium

8 March 2021	Churchill Brothers	1 - 0	Sesa Football Academy	Mapusa
	Trijoy Dias 40'			Stadium: Duler Stadium

9 March 2021	YC Manora	0 - 1	Salgaocar	Mapusa
			Selwyn Miranda 26'	Stadium: Duler Stadium

=== Round 7 ===
10 March 2021	Panjim Footballers	1 - 2	Velsao SCC	Mapusa
	Akram Yadwad 78'		Jesloy Moniz 38'; Brian Mascarenhas 86'	Stadium: Duler Stadium

11 March 2021	Sesa Football Academy	1 - 1	Sporting Clube de Goa	Mapusa
	Myron Fernandes 89' (own goal)		Marcus Masceranhas 6'	Stadium: Duler Stadium

12 March 2021	Guardian Angel	2 - 3	Churchill Brothers	Mapusa
	Gilbert Oliveira 7'; Beneston Barreto 58'		Trijoy Dias 26'; William Niasso 53' (own goal); Clinton Niasso 83'	Stadium: Duler Stadium

13 March 2021	Dempo	1 - 2	Calangute Association	Mapusa
	Suraj Hadkonkar 85'		Siddhant Shirodkar 27'; Kouame Kossonou 34'	Stadium: Duler Stadium

14 March 2021	Vasco	0 - 4	Salgaocar	Mapusa
			Steflon D'Costa 38, 70, 81'; Mark Mascarenhas 47'	Stadium: Duler Stadium

15 March 2021	FC Goa Reserves	2 - 0	YC Manora	Mapusa
	Joybert Almeida 37'; HP Lalremruata 89'			Stadium: Duler Stadium

=== Round 8 ===
16 March 2021	Calangute Association	0 - 0	Sesa Football Academy	Mapusa
				Stadium: Duler Stadium

17 March 2021	Guardian Angel	0 - 1	Velsao SCC	Mapusa
			Savelon Cardozo 44'	Stadium: Duler Stadium

18 March 2021	Churchill Brothers	1 - 1	FC Goa Reserves	Mapusa
	Afdal Varikkodan 39'		Sarineo Fernandes 7'	Stadium: Duler Stadium

19 March 2021	YC Manora	0 - 3	Dempo	Mapusa
			Edwin Viegas 17, 45'; Beevan D'Mello 90'	Stadium: Duler Stadium

20 March 2021	Vasco	1 - 1	Panjim Footballers	Mapusa
	Joaquim Abranches 76'		Joyson Gauncar 10'	Stadium: Duler Stadium

21 March 2021	Sporting Clube de Goa	1 - 1	Salgaocar	Mapusa
	Marcus Masceranhas 5'		Saeesh Halarnkar 29'	Stadium: Duler Stadium

=== Round 9 ===
22 March 2021	Churchill Brothers	2 - 0	Calangute Association	Mapusa
	Franky Oliveiro 34, 67'			Stadium: Duler Stadium

23 March 2021	YC Manora	1 - 0	Velsao SCC	Mapusa
	Nicholas Fernandes 34'			Stadium: Duler Stadium

24 March 2021	Dempo	1 - 0	Vasco	Mapusa
	Desmond Pereira 77'			Stadium: Duler Stadium

25 March 2021	FC Goa Reserves	0 - 0	Sporting Clube de Goa	Mapusa
				Stadium: Duler Stadium

26 March 2021	Guardian Angel	2 - 2	Sesa Football Academy	Mapusa
	Joel Barreto 20'; Beneston Barreto 45+1'		Cajetan Fernandes 52, 55'	Stadium: Duler Stadium

27 March 2021	Panjim Footballers	1 - 0	Salgaocar	Mapusa
	Joyson Gauncar 80'			Stadium: Duler Stadium

=== Round 10 ===
30 March 2021	Velsao SCC	2 - 2	Churchill Brothers	Mapusa
	Brian Mascarenhas 18'; Ronil Azavedo 90+5'		Jobern Cardozo 42, 54'	Stadium: Duler Stadium

18 April 2021	Sesa Football Academy	2 - 2	FC Goa	Mapusa
	Shajam P 14'; Cajetan Fernandes 90+3'		Christy Davis 40'; Kapil Hoble 75'	Stadium: Duler Stadium

5 April 2021	Guardian Angel	3 - 1	Salgaocar	Mapusa
	Beneston Barreto 1, 53, 80'		Steflon D'Costa 16'	Stadium: Duler Stadium

6 April 2021	Calangute Association	3 - 2	Panjim Footballers	Mapusa
	Siddhant Shirodkar 9, 12'; Sidharth Kundaikar 75'		Lloyd Cardozo 43'; Pandurang Gawas 48'	Stadium: Duler Stadium

7 April 2021	Sporting	4 - 4	Dempo	Mapusa
	Gourav Kankonkar 5, 68'; Kunal Kundaikar 31'; Joel Colaco 60'		Uttam Rai 8, 10, 29'; Desmond Pereira 27'	Stadium: Duler Stadium

8 April 2021	Vasco	0 - 1	Manora	Mapusa
			Melisho Camotio 24'	Stadium: Duler Stadium

=== Round 11 ===
13 April 2021	Calangute association	0 - 0	Salgaocar	Mapusa
		(Match Abandoned at the 75th minute)		Stadium: Duler Stadium

30 April 2021	Calangute association	1 - 0	Salgaocar	Margao
	Domnic Fernandes 73'	(Rematch)		Stadium: Chowgule Ground

14 April 2021	Vasco	2 - 1	FC Goa	Mapusa
	Mathew Colaco 67'; Denil Rebello 90+2'		Delton Colaco 66'	Stadium: Duler Stadium

15 April 2021	Sesa Football Academy	1 - 0	Panjim Footballers	Mapusa
	Minesh Kunkolkar 19'			Stadium: Duler Stadium

20 April 2021	Churchill Brothers	2 - 2	YC Manora	Navelim
	Anford Fernandes 37'; Myron Mendes 90'		Aniston Fernandes 69'; Sweden Barbosa 71'	Stadium: Rosary Church Ground

20 April 2021	Velsao SCC	0 - 3	Dempo	Mapusa
		walkover		Stadium: Duler Stadium

30 April 2021	Sporting Clube de Goa	9 - 0	Guardian Angel	Margao
	Marcus Masceranhas 30, 77, 90'; Gourav Kankonkar 48'; Akeraj Martins 50'; Gautam Dias 54, 71'; Philip Odogwu 56, 87'			Stadium: Chowgule Ground

== Statistics ==
=== Top scorers ===
As of 30 April 2021

Rank	Player	Club	Goals
1	(India) Marcus Masceranhas	Sporting	9
2	(India) Stephen Satarkar	Salgaocar	6
2	(India) Beneston Barreto	Guardian Angel	6
2	(Nigeria) Philip Odogwu	Sporting	6
3	(India) Steflon D'Costa	Salgaocar	5
3	(India) Siddhant Shirodkar	Calangute	5
3	(India) Uttam Rai	Dempo	5
4	(India) Beevan D'Mello	Dempo	4
4	(India) Sidharth Kundaikar	Calangute	4
4	(India) Gourav Kankonkar	Sporting	4
5	(India) Anil Gaonkar	Vasco	3
5	(Ivory Coast) Kouame Kossonou	Calangute	3
5	(India) Joaquim Abranches	Vasco	3
5	(India) Nicholas Fernandes	Manora	3
5	(India) Joel Barreto	Guardian Angel	3
5	(India) Brian Mascarenhas	Velsao	3
5	(India) Cajetan Fernandes	SESA	3
5	(India) Akeraj Martins	Sporting	3
6	(India) Aaren D'Silva	FC Goa	2
6	(India) Gaurav Vaigankar	Dempo	2
6	(India) Gilbert Oliveira	Guardian Angel	2
6	(India) Trijoy Dias	Churchill	2
6	(India) HP Lalremruata	FC Goa	2
6	(India) Edwin Viegas	Dempo	2
6	(India) Saeesh Halarnkar	Salgaocar	2
6	(India) Franky Oliveiro	Churchill	2
6	(India) Joyson Gauncar	Panjim	2
6	(India) Joybert Almeida	FC Goa	2
6	(India) Ronil Azavedo	Velsao	2
6	(India) Jobern Cardozo	Churchill	2
6	(India) Lloyd Cardozo	Panjim	2
6	(India) Desmond Pereira	Dempo	2
6	(India) Mathew Colaco	Vasco	2
6	(India) Denil Rebello	Vasco	2
6	(India) Kapil Hoble	FC Goa	2
6	(India) Sweden Barbosa	Manora	2
6	(India) Gautam Dias	Sporting	2
7	(India) Kunal Salgaonkar	SESA	1
7	(India) Fhezer Gomes	Salgaocar	1
7	(India) Dattaraj Gaonkar	Sporting	1
7	(India) Jirjar Terang	Calangute	1
7	(India) Klusner Pereira	Velsao	1
7	(India) Jovial Dias	Guardian Angel	1
7	(India) Shallum Pires	Dempo	1
7	(India) Chandan Gawas	Panjim	1
7	(India) Valentino Nazareth	Salgaocar	1
7	(India) Darrel Mascarenhas	Dempo	1
7	(India) Vasim Inamdar	FC Goa	1
7	(India) Rakesh Das	Churchill	1
7	(India) Mevan Dias	Guardian Angel	1
7	(India) Romeo Fernandes	FC Goa	1
7	(India) Richard Cardozo	Dempo	1
7	(India) Jeh Williamson	Manora	1
7	(India) Rohan Pednekar	Calangute	1
7	(India) Prasil Kankonkar	Panjim	1
7	(India) Basanta Singh	Guardian Angel	1
7	(India) Krishnanath Shirodkar	Calangute	1
7	(India) Desmon Gama	Vasco	1
7	(India) Pedro Gonsalves	Dempo	1
7	(India) Rohit Totad	Sporting	1
7	(India) Sachidanand Satelkar	Sporting	1
7	(India) Selwyn Miranda	Salgaocar	1
7	(India) Jesloy Moniz	Velsao	1
7	(India) Akram Yadwad	Panjim	1
7	(India) Clinton Niasso	Churchill	1
7	(India) Suraj Hadkonkar	Dempo	1
7	(India) Mark Mascarenhas	Salgaocar	1
7	(India) Savelon Cardozo	Velsao	1
7	(India) Sarineo Fernandes	FC Goa	1
7	(India) Afdal Varikkodan	Churchill	1
7	(India) Pandurang Gawas	Panjim	1
7	(India) Kunal Kundaikar	Sporting	1
7	(India) Joel Colaco	Sporting	1
7	(India) Melisho Camotio	Manora	1
7	(India) Sameer Kashyap	SESA	1
7	(India) Suraj	SESA	1
7	(India) Rizbon Fernandes	SESA	1
7	(India) Eldon Colaco	Manora	1
7	(India) Delton Colaco	FC Goa	1
7	(India) Minesh Kunkolkar	SESA	1
7	(India) Shajam P	SESA	1
7	(India) Christy Davis	FC Goa	1
7	(India) Anford Fernandes	Churchill Brothers	1
7	(India) Myron Mendes	Churchill Brothers	1
7	(India) Aniston Fernandes	Manora	1
7	(India) Domnic Fernandes	Calangute	1

=== Clean Sheets ===
As of 30 April 2021

Rank	Player	Club	Clean sheets
1	(India) Ozen Silva	Sporting	7
2	(India) Jason D'Mello	Salgaocar	6
3	(India) Melroy Fernandes	Dempo	4
4	(India) Sanju Thapa	Vasco	3
4	(India) Debnath Mondal	Churchill	3
4	(India) Antonio Dylan Da Silva	FC Goa	3
4	(India) Preston Rego	Panjim	3
4	(India) Paramveer Singh	Calangute	3
5	(India) Luis Barreto	Manora	2
6	(India) Prateesh Dinkan	Guardian Angel	1
6	(India) Jeet Gupta	Calangute	1
6	(India) Sapam Singh	SESA	1
6	(India) Presley Mascarenhas	Velsao	1
6	(India) Roanal Gaunkar	SESA	1
