= 2026–27 Reliance Foundation Development League =

Reliance Foundation Development League
- Season: 2026–27
- Dates: 24 October 2026 – present
- Country: India
- Teams: 54
- Matches: 75
- Goals: 333 (4.44 per match)
- Top goalscorer: Swavel Cristiano Furtado (9)
- Biggest win: Goa Police SC 0–24 Dempo (15 November 2026)
- Highest scoring: Goa Police SC 0–24 Dempo (15 November 2026)
- All statistics correct as of 21 November 2026.

The 2026–27 Reliance Foundation Development League is the sixth season of the Reliance Foundation Development League, a developmental football league organised by the Reliance Foundation.

The season features 54 teams divided into nine regions, with matches beginning on 24 October 2026. Bengaluru FC are the defending champions.

== Format ==
The competition is divided into four phases: Regional Qualifiers, Zonal Group Stage, National Group Stage and National Championship Stage.

The 54 teams are divided into nine regions for the Regional Qualifiers. A total of 24 teams qualify for the Zonal Group Stage, where they are divided into four groups of six teams. The top three teams from each group advance to the National Group Stage, which consists of two groups of six teams. The top four teams qualify for the National Championship Stage.

Phase	Name	Groups	Teams
I	Regional Qualifiers	9	54
II	Zonal Group Stage	4	24
III	National Group Stage	2	12
IV	National Championship Stage	—N/a	4

== Changes from previous season ==
The 2026–27 season introduced several changes to the format and eligibility requirements of the Reliance Foundation Development League.

- Introduction of pre-qualifiers: For the first time, pre-qualifiers were introduced for regional rounds in areas with high demand for participation. In Mumbai, six clubs competed in two groups of three, with the winners of each group advancing to the regional qualifiers alongside four clubs nominated by the RFDL Central Team.
- Revised age eligibility: Maharashtra Oranje FC stated that the 2026–27 competition had a birth-year eligibility range of 2006 to 2010, with no overage players permitted in its squad. This differed from the rules announced for the 2024 edition, which allowed clubs to include up to five players born on or after 1 January 2000, with no more than three of them in the playing XI at a time.
- Expanded National Championship: The season's announcement described an expanded National Championship at the end of the competition, following the regional qualifiers and zonal and national stages.

== Teams ==
Teams are divided into nine zones for the regional qualifiers, each containing six teams.

State/Region	Venue	Clubs	App (last)
Goa	Duler Football Stadium, Mapusa; Poriat Football Ground, Calangute	Clube de Salgaocar	4th (2025–26)
Goa	Duler Football Stadium, Mapusa; Poriat Football Ground, Calangute	Dempo SC	5th (2025–26)
Goa	Duler Football Stadium, Mapusa; Poriat Football Ground, Calangute	FC Goa	6th (2025–26)
Goa	Duler Football Stadium, Mapusa; Poriat Football Ground, Calangute	SESA FA	5th (2025–26)
Goa	Duler Football Stadium, Mapusa; Poriat Football Ground, Calangute	Sporting Clube de Goa	4th (2025–26)
Goa	Duler Football Stadium, Mapusa; Poriat Football Ground, Calangute	Goa Police SC	Debut
Kerala	TMK Arena, Vadakkencherry	Langsning FC	2nd (2025–26)
Kerala	TMK Arena, Vadakkencherry	Kerala United FC	3rd (2025–26)
Kerala	TMK Arena, Vadakkencherry	Paravur FC Kerala	5th (2025–26)
Kerala	TMK Arena, Vadakkencherry	Altius FA	Debut
Kerala	TMK Arena, Vadakkencherry	LUCA SC	Debut
Kerala	TMK Arena, Vadakkencherry	Sportto SC	Debut
Meghalaya–Mizoram	MFA Ground, Shillong, Meghalaya	Langsning FC	2nd (2025–26)
Meghalaya–Mizoram	MFA Ground, Shillong, Meghalaya	NorthEast United FC	5th (2025–26)
Meghalaya–Mizoram	MFA Ground, Shillong, Meghalaya	Rangdajied United FC	4th (2025–26)
Meghalaya–Mizoram	MFA Ground, Shillong, Meghalaya	Shillong Lajong FC	5th (2025–26)
Meghalaya–Mizoram	MFA Ground, Shillong, Meghalaya	Mawlai SC	3rd (2023–24)
Meghalaya–Mizoram	MFA Ground, Shillong, Meghalaya	PFR FA	2nd (2023–24)
Mumbai	Reliance Corporate Park, Navi Mumbai	CFCI	3rd (2025–26)
Mumbai	Reliance Corporate Park, Navi Mumbai	Maharashtra Oranje FC	4th (2025–26)
Mumbai	Reliance Corporate Park, Navi Mumbai	RFYC	6th (2025–26)
Mumbai	Reliance Corporate Park, Navi Mumbai	Mumbai City FC	5th (2024–25)
Mumbai	Reliance Corporate Park, Navi Mumbai	Mumbai Ultras	Debut
Mumbai	Reliance Corporate Park, Navi Mumbai	Young Guns FC	Debut
North	Frontier FC Ground, Chhawla, Delhi; Sudeva FC Ground, Civil Lines, Delhi	Punjab FC	5th (2025–26)
North	Frontier FC Ground, Chhawla, Delhi; Sudeva FC Ground, Civil Lines, Delhi	Rajasthan United FC	5th (2025–26)
North	Frontier FC Ground, Chhawla, Delhi; Sudeva FC Ground, Civil Lines, Delhi	Sporting Club Delhi	3rd (2025–26)
North	Frontier FC Ground, Chhawla, Delhi; Sudeva FC Ground, Civil Lines, Delhi	Sudeva Delhi FC	5th (2025–26)
North	Frontier FC Ground, Chhawla, Delhi; Sudeva FC Ground, Civil Lines, Delhi	Garhwal Heroes FC	3rd (2024–25)
North	Frontier FC Ground, Chhawla, Delhi; Sudeva FC Ground, Civil Lines, Delhi	Namdhari FC	2nd (2024–25)
ROI–1	SAI Ground, Imphal, Manipur	ASUFII FA	2nd (2025–26)
ROI–1	SAI Ground, Imphal, Manipur	Classic FA	4th (2025–26)
ROI–1	SAI Ground, Imphal, Manipur	Imphal Youth FC	2nd (2025–26)
ROI–1	SAI Ground, Imphal, Manipur	SAI-RC	4th (2025–26)
ROI–1	SAI Ground, Imphal, Manipur	KIYC	Debut
ROI–1	SAI Ground, Imphal, Manipur	RFCC Keinou	Debut
ROI–2	Bhubaneswar FA facility, Bhubaneswar	Football 4 Change Academy	4th (2025–26)
ROI–2	Bhubaneswar FA facility, Bhubaneswar	Sports Odisha	2nd (2025–26)
ROI–2	Bhubaneswar FA facility, Bhubaneswar	BLG Diamond Rock	Debut
ROI–2	Bhubaneswar FA facility, Bhubaneswar	Banaras Baghpat	Debut
ROI–2	Bhubaneswar FA facility, Bhubaneswar	Sirukalathur FC	Debut
ROI–2	Bhubaneswar FA facility, Bhubaneswar	VELS FC	Debut
South	South United Football Ground, Ulsoor, Bengaluru, Karnataka	Bengaluru FC	6th (2025–26)
South	South United Football Ground, Ulsoor, Bengaluru, Karnataka	Roots FC	5th (2025–26)
South	South United Football Ground, Ulsoor, Bengaluru, Karnataka	South United FC	2nd (2025–26)
South	South United Football Ground, Ulsoor, Bengaluru, Karnataka	Sreenidi Deccan FC	5th (2025–26)
South	South United Football Ground, Ulsoor, Bengaluru, Karnataka	FC Madras	Debut
South	South United Football Ground, Ulsoor, Bengaluru, Karnataka	HAL SC	Debut
Kolkata			

== Regional qualifiers ==
=== Mumbai Region ===
Pos	Team	Pld	W	D	L	GF	GA	GD	Pts	Qualification	RFYC	MCI	YGFC	MOFC	MUFC	CFCI
1	RFYC	3	3	0	0	8	2	+6	9	Advance to Zonal group stage				2–0		4–2
2	Mumbai City FC	3	2	1	0	10	5	+5	7	Advance to Zonal group stage				1–1	3–1	
3	Young Guns FC	3	2	0	1	6	3	+3	6	Advance to Zonal group stage	0–2					
4	MH Oranje FC	3	1	1	1	3	4	−1	4							
5	Mumbai Ultras	3	0	0	3	2	7	−5	0				0–2	1–2		
6	Community FC India	3	0	0	3	6	14	−8	0			3–6	1–4			

Updated to match(es) played on 21 November 2026. Source: RFDL
Legend: Blue = home team win; Yellow = draw; Red = away team win.

=== Goa Region ===
Pos	Team	Pld	W	D	L	GF	GA	GD	Pts	Qualification	DEMPO	FCGOA	SESA	SCG	SALG	GPSC
1	Dempo SC	4	4	0	0	36	1	+35	12	Advanced to Zonal group stage			6–0		1–0	
2	FC Goa	4	3	1	0	22	2	+20	10	Advanced to Zonal group stage				2–0	2–0	16–0
3	SESA FA	4	2	1	1	6	9	−3	7	Advanced to Zonal group stage		2–2			2–0	
4	Sporting Clube de Goa	4	1	0	3	16	9	+7	3		1–5		1–2			
5	Clube de Salgaocar	4	1	0	3	12	5	+7	3							12–0
6	Goa Police SC	4	0	0	4	0	66	−66	0		0–24			0–14		

Updated to match(es) played on 21 November 2026. Source: RFDL
Legend: Blue = home team win; Yellow = draw; Red = away team win.

=== Kerala Region ===
Pos	Team	Pld	W	D	L	GF	GA	GD	Pts	Qualification	KBFC	LUCA	KUFC	PFC	ALT	SSC
1	Kerala Blasters FC	2	2	0	0	13	0	+13	6	Advance to Zonal group stage					5–0	
2	LUCA SC	2	1	0	1	8	1	+7	3	Advance to Zonal group stage						8–0
3	Kerala United	2	1	0	1	3	2	+1	3	Advance to Zonal group stage				2–0		
4	Paravur FC Kerala	2	1	0	1	1	2	−1	3			1–0				
5	Altius FA	2	1	0	1	2	6	−4	3				2–1			
6	Sportto SC	2	0	0	2	0	16	−16	0		0–8					

Updated to match(es) played on 20 November 2026. Source: RFDL
Legend: Blue = home team win; Yellow = draw; Red = away team win.

=== North Region ===
Pos	Team	Pld	W	D	L	GF	GA	GD	Pts	Qualification	GH	PFC	SD	NFC	SCD	RUFC
1	Garhwal Heroes	3	3	0	0	9	2	+7	9	Advance to Zonal group stage			1–0			5–0
2	Punjab FC	3	2	0	1	14	5	+9	6	Advance to Zonal group stage	2–3					
3	Sudeva Delhi FC	3	2	0	1	4	1	+3	6	Advance to Zonal group stage				1–0	3–0	
4	Namdhari FC	3	1	0	2	3	11	−8	3			1–9				
5	SC Delhi	3	0	1	2	1	5	−4	1					1–2		0–0
6	Rajasthan United FC	3	0	1	2	1	8	−7	1			1–3				

Updated to match(es) played on 19 November 2026. Source: RFDL
Legend: Blue = home team win; Yellow = draw; Red = away team win.

=== South Region ===
Pos	Team	Pld	W	D	L	GF	GA	GD	Pts	Qualification	BFC	SUFC	HAL	SDFC	FCM	ROOT
1	Bengaluru FC	1	1	0	0	6	0	+6	3	Advance to Zonal group stage					6–0	
2	South United FC	1	1	0	0	6	0	+6	3	Advance to Zonal group stage						
3	HAL SC	1	0	1	0	1	1	0	1	Advance to Zonal group stage				1–1		
4	Sreenidi Deccan FC	1	0	1	0	1	1	0	1							
5	FC Madras	1	0	0	1	0	6	−6	0							
6	Roots FC	1	0	0	1	0	6	−6	0			0–6				

Updated to match(es) played on 19 November 2026. Source: RFDL
Legend: Blue = home team win; Yellow = draw; Red = away team win.

=== Meghalaya-Mizoram Region ===
Pos	Team	Pld	W	D	L	GF	GA	GD	Pts	Qualification	SLFC	RUF	MSC	NEUTD	LFC	PFR
1	Shillong Lajong	5	4	0	1	14	4	+10	12	Advanced to Zonal group stage		0–1		3–1	2–1	4–0
2	Rangdajied United	5	3	1	1	12	6	+6	10	Advanced to Zonal group stage			1–2	2–2	2–1	6–1
3	Mawlai	5	2	2	1	9	9	0	8		1–5				1–1	4–1
4	NorthEast United	5	1	3	1	13	10	+3	6				1–1			
5	Langsning	5	1	2	2	11	10	+1	5					4–4		4–1
6	PFR FA	5	0	0	5	3	23	−20	0					0–5		

Source: RFDL
Legend: Blue = home team win; Yellow = draw; Red = away team win.

=== ROI–1 Region ===
Pos	Team	Pld	W	D	L	GF	GA	GD	Pts	Qualification	CFA	ASU	RFCC	SAI	IYFC	KIYC
1	Classic FA	5	4	1	0	9	4	+5	13	Advanced to Zonal group stage		1–0		2–1	1–1	3–1
2	ASUFII FA	5	3	1	1	15	3	+12	10	Advanced to Zonal group stage			1–1	2–0		
3	RFCC Keinou	5	2	2	1	8	7	+1	8		1–2			1–0	4–0	
4	SAI, Takyel	5	2	0	3	7	8	−1	6						3–2	
5	Imphal Youth	5	1	1	3	10	19	−9	4			0–9				5–3
6	KIYC	5	0	1	4	8	16	−8	1			1–3	2–2	1–3		

Source: RFDL
Legend: Blue = home team win; Yellow = draw; Red = away team win.

=== ROI–2 Region ===
Pos	Team	Pld	W	D	L	GF	GA	GD	Pts	Qualification	SO	F4C	BLG	FCB	SFC	VELS
1	Sports Odisha	2	2	0	0	5	1	+4	6	Advance to Zonal group stage					3–1	2–0
2	F4C Academy	2	1	0	1	3	2	+1	3	Advance to Zonal group stage			1–2			2–0
3	BLG Diamond Rock	2	1	1	0	2	1	+1	4					0–0		
4	FC Banaras Baghpat	2	1	1	0	2	1	+1	4							
5	Sirukalathur FC	2	0	0	2	2	5	−3	0					1–2		
6	VELS FC	2	0	0	2	0	4	−4	0							

Updated to match(es) played on 21 November 2026. Source: RFDL
Legend: Blue = home team win; Yellow = draw; Red = away team win.

== Zonal group stage ==
A total of 24 teams will compete in the Zonal group stage, of which five have qualified so far.

=== Qualified teams ===
No.	Club	Qualified as
1	Dempo SC	Goa Region 1/2
2	FC Goa	Goa Region 1/2/3
3	SESA FA	Goa Region 2/3
4	Shillong Lajong FC	Meghalaya–Mizoram Region champions
5	Rangdajied United FC	Meghalaya–Mizoram Region runners-up
6	Classic FA	ROI–1 Region champions
7	ASUFII FA	ROI–1 Region runners-up

== Final standing ==
Final standing of 2026–27 Reliance Foundation Development League
Rank	Team	Pld	W	D	L	GF	GA	GD	Pts
Eliminated in the Regional qualifiers
44	RFCC Keinou	5	2	2	1	8	7	+1	8
45	Mawlai	5	2	2	1	9	9	0	8
46	NorthEast United	5	1	3	1	13	10	+3	6
47	SAI Takyel	5	2	0	3	7	8	−1	6
48	Langsning	5	1	2	2	11	10	+1	5
49	Imphal Youth	5	1	1	3	10	19	−9	4
50	Sporting Clube de Goa	4	1	0	3	16	9	+7	3
51	Clube de Salgaocar	4	1	0	3	12	5	+7	3
52	KIYC	5	0	1	4	8	16	−8	1
53	PFR FA	5	0	0	5	3	23	−20	0
54	Goa Police SC	4	0	0	4	0	66	−66	0

== Top scorers ==
As of 21 November 2026

Rank	Player	Club	Goals
1	Swavel Cristiano Furtado	Dempo SC	9
2	Kingson Konthoujam	FC Goa	6
3	Murphy Fernandes	Dempo SC	5
3	Likson Rebelo	SESA	5
3	Arjun D Singh	RFYC	5
3	Hamingbert Nongbet	Shillong Lajong FC	5
7	Ricky Kharkongor	Shillong Lajong FC	4
7	Azlaan Shah K H	NorthEast United FC	4
7	Kyrmenskhem Mukhim	Langsning	4
7	Khutleibam Sultan	Imphal Youth FC	4
7	Sujin S	Kerala Blasters	4
7	Shawn Franxer Fernandes	FC Goa	4
7	Nirvaan Bhatt	Community FC India	4
7	Kevin Coutinho	Young Guns	4
7	Ashnoy Prince Gomes	Clube de Salgaocar	4

== See also ==
- 2026–27 Indian Super League
- 2026–27 Indian Women's League
- 2026–27 Indian Football League
- 2026–27 Indian State Leagues
