= 2022–23 Goa Professional League =

31st season of the Pro League

Goa Professional League
- Season: 2022–23
- Dates: 6 December 2022 – 31 March 2023
- Champions: Dempo; 7th GPL title 16th Goan title
- Relegated: Velsao SCC
- Matches: 80
- Goals: 210 (2.63 per match)

The 2022–23 Goa Professional League, also known as the CAM Goa Professional League for sponsorship reasons, was the 25th season of the Goa Professional League, the top football league in the Indian state of Goa, since its establishment in 1996. DafaNews was roped in to be the associate sponsor for the tournament.

All the matches were broadcast on the FanCode website and app.

Dempo SC are the defending champions having won it for the 16th time after a decade. The Youth Club of Manora was relegated at the end of the previous season.

On 31 March 2023, Dempo SC won back-to-back titles, beating FC Goa 1–0.

== Changes ==
Eleven teams played in the 2022–23 season. No team was promoted from the GFA First Division League.

== Teams ==
Locations of current Pro League clubs

=== Stadiums ===
Matches were played at Duler Stadium in Mapusa, Nagoa Panchayat Ground, Benaulim, Tilak Maidan, and Ella.

Team	Location	District
Dempo	Panaji	North Goa
Sporting Goa	Panaji	North Goa
Panjim Footballers	Panaji	North Goa
FC Goa B	Panaji	North Goa
Calangute Association	Calangute	North Goa
SESA FA	Sanquelim	North Goa
Salgaocar	Vasco	South Goa
Vasco SC	Vasco	South Goa
Churchill Brothers	Margao	South Goa
Velsao SCC	Cansaulim	South Goa
Guardian Angel SC	Sanvordem	South Goa

== Phase 1 ==
=== Standings ===
Pos	Team	Pld	W	D	L	GF	GA	GD	Pts	Qualification
1	Salgaocar	10	6	3	1	15	7	+8	21	Super League
2	Sporting Goa	10	7	0	3	16	7	+9	21	Super League
3	Dempo	10	6	2	2	19	11	+8	20	Super League
4	Calangute Association	10	5	3	2	15	7	+8	18	Super League
5	FC Goa B	10	3	7	0	11	6	+5	16	Super League
6	Churchill Brothers	10	3	5	2	18	10	+8	14	Super League
7	Velsao	10	3	2	5	15	23	−8	11	Relegation League
8	SESA	10	3	2	5	10	13	−3	11	Relegation League
9	Panjim	10	2	2	6	9	12	−3	8	Relegation League
10	Guardian Angel	10	2	0	8	8	34	−26	6	Relegation League
11	Vasco	10	2	0	8	11	17	−6	6	Relegation League

Source: Goa Pro League - The Away End
Rules for classification: 1) points; 2) goal difference; 3) number of goals scored

== Phase 2 ==
=== GFA Super League ===
Pos	Team	Pld	W	D	L	GF	GA	GD	Pts	Qualification
1	Dempo	15	9	3	3	25	15	+10	30	Champions and qualification for 2023–24 I-League 3
2	Sporting Goa	15	9	2	4	26	15	+11	29	Qualification for 2023–24 I-League 3
3	Salgaocar	15	8	4	3	23	14	+9	28	
4	FC Goa B	15	4	10	1	17	11	+6	22	
5	Churchill Brothers	15	5	6	4	23	17	+6	21	
6	Calangute Association	15	5	5	5	18	14	+4	20	

Source: Goa Pro League - The Away End
Rules for classification: 1) points; 2) goal difference; 3) number of goals scored

=== GFA Relegation League ===
Pos	Team	Pld	W	D	L	GF	GA	GD	Pts	Qualification
1	SESA	14	4	5	5	12	14	−2	17	
2	Guardian Angel	14	5	1	8	17	38	−21	16	
3	Vasco	14	4	1	9	16	21	−5	13	
4	Panjim	14	3	3	8	14	19	−5	12	
5	Velsao	14	3	2	9	19	32	−13	11	Relegation to GFA First Division League

Source: Goa Pro League - The Away End
Rules for classification: 1) points; 2) goal difference; 3) number of goals scored

== See also ==
- 2023–24 I-League 2
- 2022–23 season in state football leagues of India
