= 2021–22 Goa Professional League =

Goa Professional League
- Season: 2021–22
- Champions: Dempo; 6th GPL title 15th Goan title
- Relegated: Youth Club of Manora
- Goals: 266

The 2021–22 Goa Professional League was the 24th season of the Goa Professional League, the top football league in the Indian state of Goa, since its establishment in 1996.

Selvel Advertising Pvt Ltd is the title sponsor of the Goa Professional League 2021–22 season. The Kolkata based media firm has signed a five-year deal with the state association for the sponsorship.

This season, the GPL is playing with 12 teams in a single leg, which will have 66 matches, all of which will broadcast on an OTT app and have Square Circle as a digital partner. The matches of the league were played at Duler Stadium, Mapusa, through to the end of October 2021.

The second leg has been split into two sections – the GFA President's Super League and GFA President's Relegation League 2021-22, each consisting of six teams based on the standings of the first-leg performance of 12 teams.

Sporting Clube de Goa were defending champions.

International betting monitoring agencies red-flagged 12 matches for suspicious betting patterns during the regular season.

== Teams ==
Goa Pro League clubs

=== Stadiums and locations ===
Matches were played at Duler Stadium in Mapusa, Chowgule Sports Complex in Margao, and Salvador do Mundo in Bardez.

Team	Location
Dempo	Panaji, North Goa
Churchill Brothers	Margao, South Goa
Sporting Goa	Panaji, North Goa
SESA FA	Sanquelim, North Goa
Salgaocar	Vasco, South Goa
FC Goa Reserves	Panaji, North Goa
Vasco SC	Vasco, South Goa
Velsao SCC	Cansaulim, South Goa
Calangute Association	Calangute, North Goa
Panjim Footballers	Panaji, North Goa
Youth Club of Manora	Raia, South Goa
Guardian Angel SC	Sanvordem, South Goa

== Phase 1 ==
=== Standings ===
Pos	Team	Pld	W	D	L	GF	GA	GD	Pts	Qualification
1	Dempo	11	8	2	1	24	5	+19	26	Super League
2	Sporting Goa	11	6	5	0	23	7	+16	23	Super League
3	SESA FA	11	5	5	1	22	11	+11	20	Super League
4	Salgaocar	11	5	4	2	16	7	+9	19	Super League
5	FC Goa Reserves	11	5	4	2	14	8	+6	19	Super League
6	Vasco	11	5	4	2	19	16	+3	19	Super League
7	Churchill Brothers	11	4	5	2	15	8	+7	17	Relegation League
8	Velsao SCC	11	4	0	7	17	29	−12	12	Relegation League
9	Calangute Association	11	3	1	7	10	17	−7	10	Relegation League
10	Panjim Footballers	11	1	4	6	6	15	−9	7	Relegation League
11	Youth Club of Manora	11	2	0	9	14	36	−22	6	Relegation League
12	Guardian Angel	11	0	2	9	6	27	−21	2	Relegation League

Source: Goa Pro League - The Away End
Rules for classification: 1) points; 2) goal difference; 3) number of goals scored

== Phase 2 ==
=== GFA President's Super League ===
Pos	Team	Pld	W	D	L	GF	GA	GD	Pts	Qualification
1	Dempo	16	11	3	2	33	11	+22	36	Champions and possible qualification for the 2022–23 I-League 2
2	Salgaocar	16	9	4	3	27	12	+15	31	Possible qualification for the 2022–23 I-League 2
3	Sporting Goa	16	7	6	3	29	15	+14	27	
4	FC Goa Reserves	16	7	6	3	22	14	+8	27	
5	SESA FA	16	6	7	3	27	17	+10	25	
6	Vasco	16	5	6	5	20	25	−5	21	

Source: Goa Pro League - The Away End
Rules for classification: 1) points; 2) goal difference; 3) number of goals scored

=== GFA President's Relegation League ===
Pos	Team	Pld	W	D	L	GF	GA	GD	Pts	Qualification
1	Churchill Brothers	16	6	7	3	20	11	+9	25	
2	Calangute Association	16	6	1	9	20	20	0	19	
3	Velsao SCC	16	5	2	9	24	38	−14	17	
4	Panjim Footballers	16	2	7	7	12	22	−10	13	
5	Guardian Angel	16	2	4	10	13	32	−19	10	
6	Youth Club of Manora	16	3	1	12	19	49	−30	10	Relegation to GFA First Division League

Source: Goa Pro League - The Away End
Rules for classification: 1) points; 2) goal difference; 3) number of goals scored

== See also ==
- 2022–23 I-League 2nd Division
- 2021–22 season in state football leagues of India
