= 2015–16 GFA First Division League =

GFA First Division League
- Season: 2015–16
- Champions: Corps of Signal
- Relegated: Panchwadi United S.C
- Matches: 56
- Goals: 169 (3.02 per match)
- Top goalscorer: (India) Abdul Khan (10 Goals)
- Biggest home win: Goa Police S.C 9–2 Panchwadi United S.C (16 February 2016)
- Biggest away win: Panchwadi United S.C 0-7 Crops of Signals (7 February 2016)
- Highest scoring: Goa Police S.C 9–2 Panchwadi United S.C (16 February 2016)

The 2015–16 GFA First Division League is the season of second-tier football in the Indian state of Goa. It began on 1 February 2016. Corps of Signals are the champions. They are promoted to Goa Professional League next season.

== Teams ==
Team	City/Town
Crops of Signal	Panaji
Sesa Football Academy	Sanquelim
Penha de France SC	Penha de France
United Club of Telaulim	Panaji
Goa Police SC	Panaji
Clube Sao Miguel de Taleigao	Taleigao
Panchwani United SC	Panchwani
Goa Velha SC	Goa Velha

=== Top Scorers ===
As of 31 March 2016

Rank	Player	Club	Goals
1	(India) Abdul Khan	Goa Police S.C	10
2	(India) L.Nakul Singh	Crops of Signals	9
2	(India) Savio Fernandes	United Club of Teleulim	9
3	(India) Gavrav Kankonkar	Goa Police S.C	7
3	(India) Aaron D'Silva	Sesa FA	7
