= 2018–19 Goa Professional League =

Goa Professional League
- Season: 2018–19
- Champions: FC Goa; 1st GPL title 1st Goan title
- Relegated: FC Bardez
- Matches played: 70
- Goals scored: 233 (3.33 per match)
- Top goalscorer: (India) Devendra Murgaonkar (20 goals)
- Longest winning run: FC Goa (4 games)
- Longest unbeaten run: FC Goa (11 games)
- Longest winless run: Corps of Signal (7 games)
- Longest losing run: FC Bardez (5 games)

The 2018–19 Goa Professional League is the 21st season of the Goa Professional League, the top football league in the Indian state of Goa, since its establishment 1996. The league kicked on 10 October 2018 and will conclude in March 2019.

The league matches are being played at the Duler Stadium Poriat Football Ground, Navelim Football Ground, Corps of Signal Football Ground.

== Teams ==
Team	City/Town
Calangute Association	Calangute
Churchill Brothers	Salcete
Corps of Signal	Navelim
Dempo	Panaji
FC Bardez	Bardez
FC Goa	Panaji
Guardian Angel F.C.	Curchorem
Panjim Footballers	Panaji
Salgaocar	Vasco da Gama
Sporting Clube de Goa	Panaji
Vasco	Vasco da Gama
Velsao Sports & Cultural Club	Velsao

== Standings ==
Pos	Team	Pld	W	D	L	GF	GA	GD	Pts	Qualification or relegation
1	FC Goa	22	17	3	2	54	21	+33	54	Champion
2	Dempo	22	16	3	3	64	20	+44	51	
3	Sporting Goa	22	14	5	3	53	21	+32	47	
4	Salgaocar	22	14	4	4	70	34	+36	46	
5	Churchill Brothers	22	11	6	5	53	22	+31	39	
6	Vasco	22	7	6	9	22	33	−11	27	
7	Velsao Sports & Cultural Club	22	7	4	11	30	35	−5	25	
8	Corps of Signal	22	6	4	12	28	43	−15	22	
9	Guardian Angel	22	4	9	9	22	38	−16	21	
10	Calangute Association	22	5	1	16	25	57	−32	16	
11	Panjim Footballers	22	3	6	13	16	45	−29	15	
12	FC Bardez	22	1	3	18	15	84	−69	6	Relegation to the First Division

Source: goa-fa.com Goalie365.com
Rules for classification: 1) points; 2) goal difference; 3) number of goals scored

== Top scorers ==
As of 12 January 2019

Rank	Player	Club	Goals
1	(India) Devendra Murgaonkar	Salgaocar	20
2	(India) Omkar Landge	Fc Goa	16
3	(India) Victorino Fernandes	Sporting Goa	11
4	(India) Jaison Vaz	Dempo	9
4	(India) Marcus Masceranhas	Sporting Goa	9
5	(India) Uttam Rai	Churchill Brothers	8
6	(India) Joseph Pereira	Velsao	7
7	(India) Joaquim Abranches	Dempo	6
7	(India) Ronaldo Oliveira	Salgaocar	6
7	(India) Beevan D'Mello	Dempo	6
