= Samir Naik =

Indian footballer

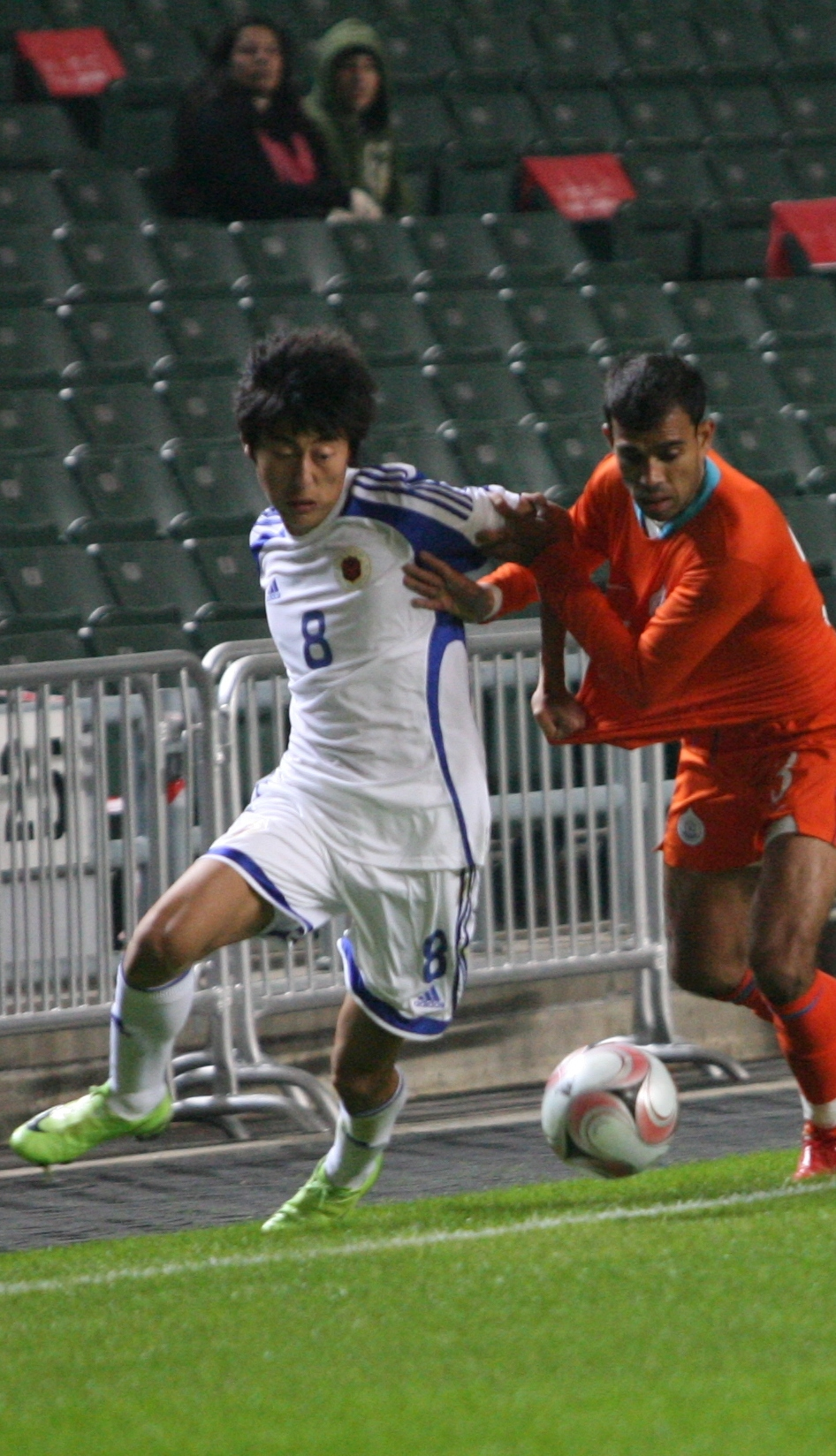
- Xu Deshuai (left) and Samir Naik (right) at the Hong Kong Stadium in 2009

Personal information
- Full name: Samir Subash Naik
- Date of birth: 8 August 1979 (age 47)
- Place of birth: Mumbai, Maharashtra, India
- Height: 1.77 m (5 ft 9 1/2 in)
- Position: Defender

Team information
- Current team: Dempo (head coach)

Youth career
- 1996–1998: Dempo

Senior career*
Years	Team	Apps	(Gls)
1998–2017	Dempo	656	(48)

International career
2000-2002	India U23	18	(2)
2002–2012	India	40	(4)

Managerial career
- 2017–: Dempo
- * Club domestic league appearances and goals

Samir Subash Naik (born 8 August 1979) is an Indian coach and former professional footballer who played as a defender for Dempo and India. He is currently coaching Dempo.

== Playing career ==
Naik is part of successful Dempo SC squad which won 2 league titles and reached the semi-final of the AFC Cup, he is also a regular for India. He also captained the Indian team in an international friendly against Oman in 2012.

== Managerial career ==
Naik became the head coach of Dempo in 2019, and in the 2021–22 Goa Professional League season, the club end decade long wait, and clinched the title in style. In the inaugural season of I-League 3 in December 2023, Dempo reached play-offs and secured promotion to I-League 2 and subsequently to I-League in the same season. He guided Dempo securing promotion to the I-League, achieving second-place finish in 2023–24 I-League 2. Thus, Dempo returned to the I-League after a gap of nine years.

== Honours ==
=== Player ===
India

- AFC Challenge Cup: 2008
- SAFF Championship: 2011; runner-up: 2008; third place: 2003
- Nehru Cup: 2009

India U23

- LG Cup: 2002

=== Manager ===
Dempo

- I-League 2 runner-up: 2023–24

Individual

- Goa Football Association Best Coach Award: 2023
