= Keenan Almeida =

Indian footballer (born 1991)

Personal information
- Full name: Keenan Succour Almeida
- Date of birth: 10 December 1991 (age 34)
- Place of birth: Margao, Goa, India
- Height: 1.81 m (5 ft 11 1/2 in)
- Position: Right back

Team information
- Current team: Clube de Salgaocar (head coach)

Youth career
- 2010–2012: Salgaocar

Senior career*
Years	Team	Apps	(Gls)
2012–2015	Sporting Goa	18	(0)
2015–2017	Goa	11	(1)
2016	→ Salgaocar (loan)	14	(0)
2017	→ Churchill Brothers (loan)	17	(0)
2017–2018	Chennaiyin	4	(0)
2018–2019	Pune City		
2019–2020	Hyderabad		
2020	→ Mumbai City (loan)		
2020–2021	Churchill Brothers		

International career
2014	India U23		

Managerial career
- 2024–: Clube de Salgaocar
- * Club domestic league appearances and goals

Keenan Almeida (born 10 December 1991) is an Indian football coach and former footballer who serves as the head coach of Goan club Clube de Salgaocar. He played as a right back.

== Career ==
Born in Margao, Goa, Almeida started his career with Salgaocar in both the I-League and Goa Professional League. Due to lack of playing time, before the 2012–13 season, Almeida signed for Sporting Goa. However, it would not be until the 2013–14 season when Almeida would make his debut for the club. It occurred on 23 November 2013 when Sporting Goa took on eventual champions, Bengaluru FC, at the Bangalore Football Stadium. He started the match and played the full 90 as it ended 0–0.

=== FC Goa ===
After failing to get regular playing time at Sporting Goa, Almeida signed for FC Goa of the Indian Super League on 18 July 2015.

On 11 March 2016, Keenan was resigned by FC Goa for 2016 Indian Super League. He played 7 times for the club in the season but could not help his team qualify for the semi-finals.

==== Churchill Brothers (loan) ====
He was signed on loan by the newly re-instated I-League club Churchill Brothers for the 2016–17 I-League season. He would make 17 appearances in the league for his team as they finish a respectable 6th.

== International ==
After being a regular for Sporting Goa during the 2013–14 I-League season, Almeida was selected for the India U23 side that would participate at the 2014 Asian Games in South Korea.

== Career statistics ==
As of 2 Feb 2020

Club	Season	League			Federation Cup		Durand Cup		AFC		Total	
Club	Season	Division	Apps	Goals	Apps	Goals	Apps	Goals	Apps	Goals	Apps	Goals
Sporting Goa	2012–13	I-League	0	0	0	0	0	0	0	0	0	0
Sporting Goa	2013–14	I-League	15	0	0	0	—	—	0	0	15	0
Sporting Goa	2014–15	I-League	3	0	0	0	0	0	0	0	3	0
FC Goa	2015	Indian Super League	4	1	—	—	—	—	—	—	4	1
FC Goa	2016	Indian Super League	7	0	—	—	—	—	—	—	7	0
Salgaocar (loan)	2015–16	I-League	14	0	0	0	—	—	0	0	14	0
Churchill Brothers (loan)	2016–17	I-League	17	0	3	0	—	—	0	0	20	0
Chennaiyin FC	2017–18	Indian Super League	4	0	—	—	—	—	—	—	4	0
FC Pune City	2018–19	Indian Super League		0	—	—	—	—	—	—		0
Hyderabad FC	2019–20	Indian Super League		0	—	—	—	—	—	—		0
Mumbai City FC (loan)	2020	Indian Super League		0	—	—	—	—	—	—		0
Career total			64	1	3	0	0	0	0	0	67	1

== Honours ==
=== Club ===
Chennaiyin FC

- Indian Super League: 2017–18

== Personal life ==
He is married to Liza Araujo since 28 December 2019.
