= Bandodkar Trophy =

- Organiser(s): Goa Football Association
- Founded: 1970; 56 years ago
- Region: Goa, India
- Teams: Various
- Current champions: Goa (2nd title)
- Most championships: Dempo (8 titles)
- Broadcaster(s): SportsCast India (YouTube); FIFA+
- 2025

The Bandodkar Trophy, currently known as the Bhausaheb Bandodkar Memorial Trophy, is an Indian football tournament held in Goa and organized by the Goa Football Association. It was also known as the Bandodkar Gold Trophy till the 2016 edition, when the tournament was revamped in a new format. The tournament was first played in 1970.

== History ==
The Bandodkar Gold Trophy was the first major cup tournament hosted by the GFA, aided by the then Chief Minister Dayanand Bandodkar who donated the trophy. Apart from some top clubs from Goa, clubs from other Indian states and abroad, also have participated in this competition. Dempo SC has won the tournament for a record eight times, while Salgaocar FC won the last major edition held in 1992.

In 2016, the historic tournament was revived as an invitational u-21 Men's football tournament and was held at Duler Stadium in Goa. The edition was won by FC Pune City (R) defeating the local side Dempo SC.

In 2024, the GFA announced that the tournament is scheduled to be revived in the 2024 season with backing from the Government of Goa.

== Results ==
List of Bandodkar Trophy finals
Year	Champions	Score	Runners-up	Ref.
1970	Leaders Club, Jalandhar	1–1, 1–0	Salgaocar	
1971	Vasco	1–0	Dempo	
1972	South Central Railway (SCR), Secunderabad	1–1, 5–4	Coal India (CIL), Bangalore	
1973	Orkay Mills	3–2	Dempo	
1974	Panvel SC	2–0	Sesa	
1975	Vasco	3–1	Dempo	
1976	Dempo	3–0	Leaders Club, Jalandhar	
1977	Tata SC	0–0, 4–2	Central Bank of India	
1978	Orkay Mills and Dempo (joint winners) – 1–1, 0–0			
1979	Sesa	2–2, 1–0	Salgaocar	
1980	Mahindra and Mahindra and Sesa (joint winners) – 2–2, 1–1			
1981	Salgaocar	3–0	Vasco	
1982	Dempo	3–0	Salgaocar	
1983	Dempo	5–1	Indian Telephone Industries	
1984	Dempo	2–0	Salgaocar	
1986	Dempo	4–1	Border Security Force	
1988	Salgaocar	4–0	Mahindra and Mahindra	
1990	Dempo	1–0	Salgaocar	
1991	Dempo	4–0	Salcete FC	
1992	Salgaocar	1–0	Marmugao Port Trust	
	Tournament not held between 1993–2015			
2016	Pune City (R)	2–1	Dempo	
	Tournament not held between 2017–2023			
2023–24	Goa (R)	0–0 (4–3 p)	Kerala Blasters (R)	
2024	Goa	3–3 (3–1 p)	Odisha	

== Broadcasting ==
After the Santosh Trophy and Gujarat Super League, the Bandodkar Trophy became the third Indian football tournament to be streamed globally on FIFA+.

Territory	Broadcaster(s)	Ref.
India	SportsCast India (YouTube)	
(United Nations) Global	FIFA+	
