= Goa Women's League =

- Organising body: Goa Football Association (Goa)
- Founded: 2017; 9 years ago
- Country: India
- Number of clubs: 6
- Level on pyramid: 3
- Promotion to: Indian Women's League 2
- Current champions: Sesa (1st title) (2024–25)
- Most championships: Panjim Footballers (2 titles)
- Broadcaster(s): SportsCast India (YouTube)

The Goa Women's League (also known as the GFA Vedanta Women's League for sponsorship reasons) is the top division of women's football league in the Indian state of Goa. The League was first held in 2017 and is organised by the Goa Football Association (GFA), the official football governing body of the state.

== Clubs ==
=== 2026–27 season ===
No.	Team
1	Sesa
2	Dunes SC Mandrem
3	SC Siolim
4	Livval SA
5	Mandopa SC
6	Sinquerim SC

== Champions ==
Edition	Season	Champion	Runners-up	Ref
1st	2017	Panjim Footballers	SCC Cavelossim SOWS	
2nd	2018	Panjim Footballers	FC Goa	
3rd	2019	Bidesh XI SC	Albert Developers SC	
4th	2020–21	Sirvodem SC	FC Goa	
5th	2021–22	Suspended due to COVID-19 epidemic in Goa		
6th	2022–23	Churchill Brothers Women	Compassion FC	
7th	2023–24	FC Tuem	Vintage 73 SC	
8th	2024–25	Sesa	Maina SC	

== See also ==
- Women's football in India
