= Clube de Salgaocar =

Indian professional association football club

CD Salgaocar
- Full name: Clube de Salgaocar
- Short name: CDS
- Founded: 2024; 2 years ago
- Ground: Duler Stadium
- Capacity: 5,000
- Owner: Dattaraj V. Salgaocar
- Head coach: Keenan Almeida
- League: Goa Professional League; I-League 3
- Website: vmsalgaocarcorp.com/clube-de-salgaocar/
Home colours	Away colours

Clube de Salgaocar is an Indian professional football club based in Vasco, Goa.

== History ==
After Salgaocar shut down its senior team, industrialist Dattaraj Salgaocar, who previously owned FC Goa for the first two years of its existence, had a bid accepted for a brand new team to enter the Goa Professional League. His father Vasudev Salgaocar founded and ran Salgaocar until his death, after which Dattaraj and his brother Shivanand held on to its reins. Eight years after he was forced to end his association with FC Goa, Dattaraj Salgaocar returned to the Goan football scene with a club of his own. Salgaocar Corporation paid the 50 lakh direct entry fee and entered the 2024–25 Goa Professional League.

Before the 2024–25 Goa Professional League, Keenan Almeida was appointed the head coach of Clube de Salgaocar, along with other members of the technical staff. The team took part in the 2024 Bandodkar Trophy and reached the final round of the qualifiers, where they missed out the main tournament by a whisker to Sporting Clube de Goa.

They made their Goa Pro League debut in the 2024-25 season. The squad featured a roster largely composed of under-21 players. On the final day of the season, they beat Geno SC 2-0 and finished 3rd in the table to claim a spot in the 2025 I-League 3 season.

== Current squad ==
As of 13 October 2026

Note: Flags indicate national team as defined under FIFA eligibility rules; some limited exceptions apply. Players may hold more than one non-FIFA nationality.

No.	Pos.	Nation	Player
1	GK	IND	Acton Barbosa
2	DF	IND	Brian Faria
4	DF	IND	Akash Meetei
5	DF	IND	Umang Gaikwad
6	FW	IND	Vivaan Sampat
7	FW	IND	Sankalp Kankonkar
8	MF	IND	Alent Colaco
9	FW	IND	Doyal Alves
10	FW	IND	Isac Zomuanpuia
11	MF	IND	Shridarnath Gawas
14	DF	IND	Reezvon Fernandes
15	FW	IND	Royson Colaco
16	DF	IND	Mevzen Olieveira
17	MF	IND	Tohid Yattanali
18	FW	IND	Preston Castano

No.	Pos.	Nation	Player
21	GK	IND	Sanij Bugde (Captain)
22	FW	IND	Jovial Dias
23	MF	IND	Francis Lalhruaizela
24	FW	IND	Mildroy Menezes
25	DF	IND	Tippanna Bhavikatti
26	MF	IND	Suraj Kumar
30	DF	IND	Zidan Shaikh
31	GK	IND	Ali
37	DF	IND	Scott Fernandes
47	FW	IND	Salvador Gama
77	FW	IND	Shanon Viegas
88	FW	IND	Beckham Singh

== See also ==
- Phoenix club (sports)
