= List of Goan state football champions =

This is a list of champions of the Goa Professional League ever since its creation in 1951 as the Goan First Division.

== History ==
The official league in Goa, called the First Division began in 1951 and it was organised by the Conselho de Desportos. There was no Super League. The first League champion of Goa was Clube Desportivo de Chinchinim who beat Football Club of Siolim, to clinch the title.

The League continued under the aegis of the Conselho de Desportos till the season of 1958-59, with Clube de Desportos de Vasco da Gama taking the title that year. In 1959, the Goa Football Association was established as the official administrative body of football and from that season onwards the league was conducted by GFA. The 1959-60 League was conducted by the GFA and Clube Independente de Margao emerged champions.

In 1970-71 season, apart from the Senior Division League, there came into existence the first division league which was split into two groups, namely the North Zone and South Zone. While the North Zone consisted of teams from Ilhas and Bardez the South Zone accommodated teams from Mormugao and Salcete.

In 1977, the Goa Football Association introduced the Super League in the season of 1977-78, with Salgaocar Sports Club clinching the title. With football, globally, continuing to develop at a fast pace, the Goa Football Association, decided it was time to push the game onto a higher platform. Goa emerged as the first State ever in the country, to go professional with the game and till date it remains the only State in the country, where the status of the game is professional.

The first Professional League was launched in the 1998-99 season with 5 teams.

The Professional league was expanded to six teams from the 2000-2001 season, after the GFA thought it wise to increase the number and increase the competitiveness factor, and since 2002 the league was played as an eight team league with home-and-away fixtures making it 14 matches for each club. The GFA then announced that the 2011 season would be played with 10 teams under a new format in which Salgaocar won in.

== List of champions ==
First Division League

Season	Champions
1951-52	Clube Desportivo Chinchinim
1952-53	Sporting Clube de Goa
1953-54	Clube de Desportos de Vasco da Gama
1954-55	Associacao Desportiva de Velha Goa
1955-56	Clube de Desportos de Vasco da Gama
1956-57	Associacao Desportiva de Velha Goa
1957-58	Grupo Desportivo da Policia
1958-59	Clube de Desportos de Vasco da Gama
1959-60	Clube Independente de Margao
1960-61	Clube Desportivo Salgaocar
1962-63	Salgaocar Sports Club
1963-64	Salgaocar Sports Club
1964-65	Vasco Sports Club
1965-66	Salgaocar Sports Club
1966-67	Vasco Sports Club
1967-68	Sesa Goa Sports Club
1968-69	Vasco Sports Club
1969-70	League Unfinished
1970-71	League Unfinished
1971-72	Dempo Sports Club
1972-73	Sesa Goa Sports Club
1973-74	Dempo Sports Club
1974-75	Salgaocar Sports Club
1975-76	not held due to national emergency
1976-77	not held due to national emergency

Super League

Season	Champion
1977-78	Salgaocar Sports Club
1978-79	Dempo Sports Club
1979-80	Dempo Sports Club
1980-81	Dempo Sports Club
1981-82	Salgaocar Sports Club
1982-83	Salgaocar Sports Club
1983-84	Dempo Sports Club
1984-85	Salgaocar Sports Club
1985-86	Salgaocar Sports Club
1986-87	Dempo Sports Club
1987-88	Dempo Sports Club
1988-89	Salgaocar Sports Club
1989-90	MRF Sports Foundation
1990-91	Salgaocar Sports Club
1991-92	MRF Sports Foundation
1992-93	Salgaocar Sports Club
1993-94	Dempo Sports Club
1994-95	Salgaocar Sports Club
1995-96	Churchill Brothers SC
1996-97	Churchill Brothers SC
1997-98	Churchill Brothers SC

Goa Professional League

Season	Champion
1998	Salgaocar
1999	Churchill Brothers
2000	Churchill Brothers
2001	Churchill Brothers
2002	Salgaocar
2003	Salgaocar
2004	Salgaocar
2005	Dempo
2006	Sporting Goa
2007	Dempo
2008	Churchill Brothers
2009	Dempo
2010	Dempo
2011	Dempo
2012–13	Salgaocar
2013–14	Sporting Goa
2014–15	Salgaocar F.C.
2015–16	Sporting Goa
2016–17	Salgaocar F.C.
2017–18	Sporting Goa
2018-19	FC Goa Reserves
2019-20	Sporting Goa and Churchill Brothers
2020-21	Sporting Goa
2021-22	Dempo
2022-23	Dempo
2023-24	Sporting Goa

== Most titles ==
Season	Champion
21	Salgaocar FC
16	Dempo Sports Club
8	Churchill Brothers FC Goa
6	Vasco Sports Club
6	Sporting Goa
2	Associacao Desportiva de Velha Goa
2	MRF Sports Foundation
2	Sesa Goa Sports Club
1	Clube Desportivo Chinchinim
1	Clube Independente de Margao
1	FC Goa Reserves
1	Grupo Desportivo da Policia
1	Sporting Clube de Goa

== See also ==
- Goa Professional League
- Goa Football Association
