= Pax of Nagoa SC =

Indian professional association football club

Pax of Nagoa
- Full name: Pax of Nagoa Sports Club
- Nickname(s): The Pax
- Short name: PXN
- Founded: 1963; 62 years ago
- Ground: Nagoa Ground
- Owner: Ravi Cabral
- Head coach: Mateus Costa
- League: Goa Professional League
Home colours	Away colours

Pax of Nagoa Sports Club is an Indian professional football club based in Nagoa, Goa. They are a village club from the Nagoa and Verna area and currently compete in the Goa Professional League.

== History ==
Pax of Nagoa was founded in 1963 by Fr. Bruno Diniz to unite the villagers of Nagoa through football and nurture local young talent. In its earlier years, the club participated in the second and first division, and professional league conducted by the Goa Football Association (GFA).

The P in Pax stands for Peace; A stands for Amor /ˈæmər/ (Latin: Amor, "love"); and X stands for Christ in Greek.

=== 2008–present ===
After the closure of Fransa-Pax in 2008, the other club based in Nagoa known as Pax of Nagoa, continued participating in village tournaments like the Verna and Curtorim Panchayat Cups. In 2010, they entered the GFA Third Division.

In 2023, after winning the Salcete Zone of the Goan Third Division, Pax of Nagoa signed an MOU with CFS Charities, paid the franchise fee, moved to the Goa Professional League, and participated in the 2023–24 Goa Professional League. They appointed Mateus Costa as head coach for the season. They also entered their U17 team into the 2024 Reliance Foundation Development League.

They finished fourth in the 2023–24 Goa Professional League season.

== Honours ==
- GFA Third Division
  - Winners (Salcete Zone): 2022–23
