= Marcus Masceranhas =

Indian footballer

Personal information
- Date of birth: 16 April 1987 (age 39)
- Place of birth: Margao, Goa, India
- Height: 1.75 m (5 ft 9 in)
- Position: Forward

Team information
- Current team: Sporting Goa
- Number: 11

Youth career
- SESA FA

Senior career*
Years	Team	Apps	(Gls)
2010–2014	Salgaocar		
2014	Laxmi Prasad		
2015–	Sporting Goa	249	(90)
- * Club domestic league appearances and goals as of 16 May 2015

Marcus Masceranhas (born 16 April 1987) is an Indian footballer who currently plays for Sporting Clube de Goa in the Goa Professional League and won the competition in 2020–21 alongside emerging as the top goalscorer.

== Career statistics ==
=== Club ===
As of 21 December 2013

Club	Season	League			Cup			AFC			Total		
Club	Season	Apps	Goals	Assists	Apps	Goals	Assists	Apps	Goals	Assists	Apps	Goals	Assists
Salgaocar	2012–13	7	3	1	0	0	0	-	-	-	7	3	1
Salgaocar	2013–14	2	0	0	0	0	0	-	-	-	2	0	0
Career total		9	3	1	0	0	0	0	0	0	9	3	1

== Honours ==
=== Individual ===
- Goa Professional League Golden Boot: 2018–19, 2019–20
