= Institutional League =

Association football league in India

- Organising body: All India Football Federation
- Country: India

The Institutional League was a proposed Indian men's football league.

The All India Football Federation announced in the press conference on 14 April 2023 that a new Institutional League will be organised with at least ten teams on home and away basis. The teams will be decided via bidding process. The league was expected to start in January 2024, but was later abandoned.

== History ==
After the disbanding of clubs associated with public sector undertakings for not fulfilling Asian Football Confederation club licensing criteria, the All India Football Federation (AIFF) was planning to make a corporate-clubs league in July 2017. A proposal was sent to the All India Public Sector Sports Promotion Board (AIPSSPB), but it was not organised then.

The AIFF held a pre-meeting with 25 interested teams on 31 August 2023. A few days later Request for Proposal was issued to the interested teams.

AIFF also mandated that the winners and runners-up of the Institutional League will be awarded direct entry into the Federation Cup 2024. The promotion-relegation system will also be applicable if there are more than one division in the league.

== Interested teams ==
The following 25 teams joined the pre-bid consultation meeting by the AIFF.

Club	State	City	Industry	League/Cup
Aeronautical Development Establishment	Karnataka	Bengaluru	Defence	Bangalore Super Division
Air India	Maharashtra	Mumbai	Aviation	MFA Elite Corporate League
ASC Centre South	Karnataka	Bengaluru	Defence	Bangalore Super Division
Bank of Baroda	Maharashtra	Vadodara	Banking	MFA Elite Corporate League
BSF North Bengal	West Bengal	Siliguri	Defence	
BSF Punjab	Punjab	Jalandhar	Defence	Punjab State Super League
Chennai Customs	Tamil Nadu	Chennai	Trade and Travel	Chennai Football League
CRPF	Punjab	Jalandhar	Defence	Punjab State Super League
CSIR – National Institute of Oceanography	Goa		Research	
Dravstream Tech Pvt Ltd	Maharashtra	Mumbai	Media	
Employee State Insurance Corporation	Tamil Nadu	Chennai	Social Security	
Employee State Insurance Corporation	Delhi	New Delhi	Social Security	
Hindustan Aeronautics	Karnataka	Bengaluru	Aeronautics	Bangalore Super Division
Indian Navy	Kerala	Kochi	Defence	Kerala Premier League
Indian Railways	Delhi	New Delhi	Transport	
IndiaPost Karnataka	Karnataka	Bengaluru	Postal Service	
JCT	Punjab	Phagwara	Textile	Punjab State Super League
Karnataka Police	Karnataka	Bengaluru	Police	
Oil India Ltd - Assam Field HQ	Assam	Duliajan	Petroleum and Gas	
PDC Services (Alchemy Football)	Karnataka	Bengaluru	Management	
PFA Organization	Haryana		Animal Welfare	
Punjab Police	Punjab	Jalandhar	Police	Punjab State Super League
Reserve Bank of India	Maharashtra	Mumbai	Banking	MFA Elite Corporate League
Reserve Bank of India	Karnataka	Bengaluru	Banking	
Services Sports Control Board	Delhi	New Delhi	Defence	

== See also ==
- Football in India
- History of Indian football
- List of football clubs in India
- Indian football league system
- Indian Super League
- I-League
- I-League 2
- I-League 3
- Indian State Leagues
- Santosh Trophy
- Federation Cup
- Durand Cup
- Super Cup
- Futsal Club Championship
