= Nagoa =

- Village
- Location of Nagoa in Goa Nagoa (India)
- Coordinates: 15°21′30″N 73°55′38″E
- Country: India
- State: Goa
- District: South Goa
- Sub-district: Salcete
- Time zone: UTC+5:30 (IST)
- Postcode: 403722
- Area code: 0832

Nagoa is a village in Salcette, Goa, adjacent to the village of Verna. It is located approximately 11 km north of the South Goa district headquarters Margão, 17 km south-east of Vasco da Gama and 22 km south-east of the state capital Panjim.
