= Guardian Angel SC =

Indian professional association football club

- Full name: Guardian Angel Sports Club
- Short name: GASC
- Founded: 1972; 53 years ago
- Ground: Figueredo Ground and Rosary Ground
- Owner: John J Fernandes
- League: Goa Professional League

Guardian Angel Sports Club is an Indian professional football club based in Curchorem, Goa, India. Established on October 2, 1972, the club has a rich history in Goan football and currently competes in the Goa Professional League and plays home matches at the Figueredo Ground in Curchorem. Their home ground for Goan Professional League is Rosary Ground.

Guardian Angel SC has been recognized for contributing to the local football scene.

They hosted the first All Goa Guardian Angel Festival Soccer - inter-village football tournament in November 2023 at Curchorem where they reached the finals and defeated Curtorim Gymkhana by 6–5 by a tie-breaker.

They participated in Bandolkar Trophy, organised by Goa Football Association in August 2024.

They participated in the 13th Our Lady of Fatima Cup inter-village football tournament played at Dicarpale ground in September 2024.

They participated and defeated Navelim Sporting Club by 4–1 to clinch the 45th St Joseph Festival inter-village football tournament organised by Dramapur Sports Club at the Dramapur ground in October 2024.

The club recently organised the Fr. Gervasio Pinto Memorial Inter-Village Football Tournament in November 2024.

They will also field their female squad for the first time in the 2024–25 season of Goa's Women League. This will be their first and inaugural season in the league.

== Honours ==
- All Goa Guardian Angel Festival Soccer - inter-village football tournament
  - Champions (1): (2023)
- 13th Our Lady of Fatima Cup inter-village football tournament
  - Semi-Finals: (2024)
- 45th St Joseph Festival inter-village football tournament
  - Champions: 2024
