= Goa Football League =

Indian football league in the state of Goa

- Organising body: Goa Football Association
- Founded: 1951–1977 (as Goa Primeira Divisão or Goa First Division); 1977–1997 (as Goa Super Division); 1997–present (as Goa Professional League)
- Country: India
- Number of clubs: 14
- Level on pyramid: 5–8
- Promotion to: Various
- Relegation to: Various
- Domestic cup: Bandodkar Trophy
- League cup(s): Goa Police Cup; AWES Cup; GFA Charity Cup
- Current champions: Dempo (16th title)
- Most championships: Salgaocar (22 titles)
- Broadcaster(s): FanCode; SportsCast India (YouTube)
- Current: 2025–26

The Goa Football League is a ladder-based football competition in the Indian state of Goa, organised by the Goa Football Association as part of the state leagues. It was formed in 1951 as the Goa Primeira Divisão or Goa First Division, and the current top division consists of the Goa Professional League (abbreviated as GPL, also known as the CAM Goa Pro League for sponsorship reasons) which is the premier state-level football league in Goa. Dempo is the most successful club in the tournament, with sixtteen titles.

== History ==
=== Goa Primeira Divisão / Goa First Division ===
The official league in Goa, called the Goa Primeira Divisão or Goa First Division, began in 1951 and was organised by the Conselho de Desportos. The first League champion of Goa was Clube Desportivo de Chinchinim who beat Football Club of Siolim, to clinch the title.

League continued under the aegis of the Conselho de Desportos until the season of 1958–59, with Clube de Desportos de Vasco da Gama taking the title that year. In 1959, the Goa Football Association was established as the official administrative body of football and from that season onwards the league was conducted by GFA. The 1959–60 League was conducted by the GFA and Clube Independente de Margao emerged champions.

Until the 1968–69 season, the First division league was considered as senior. The GFA introduced Senior Division in 1969–70, which used to be the topmost division, but later was abandoned.

In 1970–71 season, apart from the Senior division league, there came into existence the First division league, which was split into two groups, namely the North Zone and South Zone. While the North Zone consisted of teams from Ilhas and Bardez, the South Zone accommodated teams from Mormugao and Salcete.

From the around 24 teams in the Second division, just one would make it to the First division, while there were around 60 teams battling it out in the Third division, of which two teams make it to the next stage. Subsequently, the teams finishing at the bottom of their respective pool are relegated to lower divisions.

=== Goa Super Division ===
In 1977 Goa Football Association introduced the Super League, with Salgaocar Sports Club clinching the title. With football continuing to develop at a fast pace, GFA decided it was time to push the game onto a higher platform. Goa emerged as the first State ever in the country, to go fully professional with the game.

=== Goa Professional League ===
The first Professional league was launched in the 1998–99 season. The five top teams of the 1997–98 Super League – Churchill Brothers, Salgaocar, Dempo, Vasco and VLM SC – automatically qualified for the Pro league.

The Professional league was expanded to six teams from the 2000–01 season, after the GFA increased the participating number and competitiveness factor. Since 2002 the league was played as an eight-team format with home-and-away fixtures, making it 14 matches for each club. The GFA then announced that the 2011 season would be played with 10 teams under a new format.

== Competition structure ==
| Tier | Division |
|---|---|
| 1 _{(5 on Indian football pyramid)} | Goa Professional League |
| 2 _{(6 on Indian football pyramid)} | GFA First Division League |
| 3 _{(7 on Indian football pyramid)} | GFA Second Division League |
| 4 _{(8 on Indian football pyramid)} | GFA Third Division League |

== Goa Pro League ==
Goa Pro League
- Country: India
- Level on pyramid: 5
- Promotion to: I-League 3
- Relegation to: GFA First Division
- Current champions: Dempo SC

The first Professional league was launched in the 1998–99 season. The five top teams of the 1997–98 Super League – Churchill Brothers, Salgaocar, Dempo, Vasco and VLM SC – automatically qualified for the Pro league.

The Professional league was expanded to six teams from the 2000–01 season, after the GFA increased the participating number and competitiveness factor. Since 2002 the league was played as an eight-team format with home-and-away fixtures, making it 14 matches for each club. The GFA then announced that the 2011 season would be played with 10 teams under a new format.

=== GPL current clubs ===
The following clubs are competing in the GPL during the 2023–24 season.

| Club | Location |
|---|---|
| Dempo | Carambolim |
| Sporting Goa | Panaji |
| Panjim FC | Panaji |
| Young Boys of Tonca | Caranzalem |
| FC Goa B | Porvorim |
| Calangute Association | Calangute |
| SESA FA | Sanquelim |
| Geno Sports Club | Mapusa |
| Vasco SC | Vasco |
| Cortalim Villagers | Cortalim |
| Pax of Nagoa SC | Verna |
| Churchill Brothers | Margao |
| Guardian Angel SC | Curchorem |

Location of GFL teams

== List of Goan champions ==
| Season | Champion |
|---|---|
Goa Primeira Divisão / Goa First Division
| 1951–52 | Clube Desportivo Chinchinim |
| 1952–53 | Sporting Clube de Goa |
| 1953–54 | Clube de Desportos de Vasco da Gama |
| 1954–55 | Associacao Desportiva de Velha Goa |
| 1955–56 | Clube de Desportos de Vasco da Gama |
| 1956–57 | Associacao Desportiva de Velha Goa |
| 1957–58 | Grupo Desportivo da Policia |
| 1958–59 | Clube de Desportos de Vasco da Gama |
| 1959–60 | Clube Independente de Margao |
| 1960–61 | Clube Desportivo Salgaocar |
| 1962–63 | Salgaocar Sports Club |
| 1963–64 | Salgaocar Sports Club |
| 1964–65 | Vasco Sports Club |
| 1965–66 | Salgaocar Sports Club |
| 1966–67 | Vasco Sports Club |
| 1967–68 | Sesa Goa Sports Club |
| 1968–69 | Vasco Sports Club |
| 1969–70 | League Unfinished |
| 1970–71 | League Unfinished |
| 1971–72 | Dempo Sports Club |
| 1972–73 | Sesa Goa Sports Club |
| 1973–74 | Dempo Sports Club |
| 1974–75 | Salgaocar Sports Club |
| 1975–76 | not held due to national emergency |
| 1976–77 | not held due to national emergency |
Goa Super League
| 1977–78 | Salgaocar Sports Club |
| 1978–79 | Dempo Sports Club |
| 1979–80 | Dempo Sports Club |
| 1980–81 | Dempo Sports Club |
| 1981–82 | Salgaocar Sports Club |
| 1982–83 | Salgaocar Sports Club |
| 1983–84 | Dempo Sports Club |
| 1984–85 | Salgaocar Sports Club |
| 1985–86 | Salgaocar Sports Club |
| 1986–87 | Dempo Sports Club |
| 1987–88 | Dempo Sports Club |
| 1988–89 | Salgaocar Sports Club |
| 1989–90 | MRF Sports Foundation |
| 1990–91 | Salgaocar Sports Club |
| 1991–92 | MRF Sports Foundation |
| 1992–93 | Salgaocar Sports Club |
| 1993–94 | Dempo Sports Club |
| 1994–95 | Salgaocar Sports Club |
| 1995–96 | Churchill Brothers SC |
| 1996–97 | Churchill Brothers SC |
| 1997–98 | Churchill Brothers SC |
Goa Professional League
| 1998 | Salgaocar |
| 1999 | Churchill Brothers |
| 2000 | Churchill Brothers |
| 2001 | Churchill Brothers |
| 2002 | Salgaocar |
| 2003 | Salgaocar |
| 2004 | Salgaocar |
| 2005 | Dempo |
| 2006 | Sporting Goa |
| 2007 | Dempo |
| 2008 | Churchill Brothers |
| 2009 | Dempo |
| 2010–11 | Dempo |
| 2011 | Salgaocar |
| 2011–12 | Dempo |
| 2012–13 | Salgaocar |
| 2013–14 | Sporting Goa |
| 2014–15 | Salgaocar |
| 2015–16 | Sporting Goa |
| 2016–17 | Salgaocar |
| 2017–18 | Sporting Goa |
| 2018–19 | FC Goa Reserves |
| 2019–20 | Sporting Goa and Churchill Brothers |
| 2020–21 | Sporting Goa |
| 2021–22 | Dempo |
| 2022–23 | Dempo |
| 2023–24 | Sporting Goa |
| 2024–25 | Sporting Goa |
| 2025–26 | Sporting Goa |
Source: Goa League Champions

== GPL top scorers ==
| Season | Top scorer | Club | Goals |
|---|---|---|---|
| 2011 | (Nigeria) Koko Sakibo (India) Victorino Fernandes | Dempo S.C. Sporting Clube de Goa | 6 |
| 2012–13 | (Spain) Juanfri | Sporting Clube de Goa | 3 |
| 2013–14 | (India) Melwin Fernandes | Wilred Leisure | 13 |
| 2014–15 | (India) Victorino Fernandes | Sporting Clube de Goa | 11 |
| 2015–16 | (Nigeria) Odafa Okolie | Sporting Clube de Goa | 11 |
| 2016–17 | (India) Liston Colaco | Salgaocar F.C. | 13 |
| 2017–18 | (Nigeria) Joel Sunday | Salgaocar F.C. | 20 |
| 2018–19 | (India) Devendra Murgaonkar | Salgaocar F.C. | 20 |
| 2019–20 | (India) Marcus Masceranhas | Sporting Clube de Goa | 14 |
| 2020–21 | (India) Marcus Masceranhas | Sporting Clube de Goa | 9 |

== First Division League ==
Goa First Division
- Founded: 1970
- Country: India
- Number of clubs: 14
- Level on pyramid: 6
- Promotion to: Goa Professional League
- Relegation to: GFA Second Division
- Current champions: Dempo SC U21

The Goa Football Association First Division (First Division) is the second-highest state level football league in Goa, following the Goa Pro League. It is organised by the Goa Football Association. The champions of the First division get promoted to the GPL. It is contested by 14 clubs. As of 2023, there are 15 clubs playing the league, with each team playing a total number of 13 matches. It is usually played from March to May.

=== First Division clubs ===
Club
CSM Minguel de Taleigao
Goa Police SC
Goa Velha SC
Salgaocar FC U21
Sesa FA
Dempo S.C. U21
UC Telaulim
Curtorim Gymkhana
YC Manora
Cuncolim Union
St Savio SC
AA de Moira
SSC Cavelossim
Dunes SC
BITS Goa FC

Sources

- Goa Football Website
- First Division Scores
- First Division League News

== See also ==
- Bandodkar Trophy
- Goa Police Cup
