= Carambolim =

Carambolim Karmali
- village
- Location in Goa, India Carambolim (India)
- Coordinates: 15°29′15″N 73°55′55″E
- Country: India
- State: Goa
- District: North Goa
- Elevation: 59 m (194 ft)

Languages
  - Official: Konkani
- Time zone: UTC+5:30 (IST)
- Vehicle registration: GA
- Coastline: 0 kilometres (0 mi)
- Nearest city: Panaji
- Website: goa.gov.in

Carambolim, also called Karmali, is a village in North Goa district, Goa, India.

== Geography ==
It is located at an elevation of 5 m above MSL.

== Location ==
The railway station at Carambolim (Karmali) falls under the jurisdiction of the Konkan Railway.
