= Goa Police =

- Emblem of the Goa Police
- Abbreviation: GP

Jurisdictional structure
- Operations jurisdiction: Goa, IN
- Map of Goa Police Department's jurisdiction
- Legal jurisdiction: As per operations jurisdiction
- General nature: Local civilian police

Operational structure
- Headquarters: Panjim, Goa, India

Website
- citizen.goapolice.gov.in

The Goa Police is the law enforcement agency for the coastal state of Goa, India.

== Organisational structure ==
The Goa Police operates under direct control of the Department of Home Affairs, Government of Goa.

=== Hierarchy ===
==== Officers ====
- Director general of police (DGP)
- Inspector general of police (IGP)
- Deputy inspector general of police (DIG)
- Superintendent of police (SP)
- Deputy superintendent of police (DySP)

==== Subordinates ====
- Inspector of Police (PI)
- Sub-inspector of police (PSI)
- Assistant sub-inspector of police (ASI)
- Head constable (HC)
- Police constable (PC)

== History ==
The Goa Police was established in 1966 after the transfer of authority over Goa from the Indian military administration to the civil administration. It replaced the former Portuguese administration's Polícia do Estado da Índia (State of India Police), disbanded after the annexation of Goa by India in 1961.

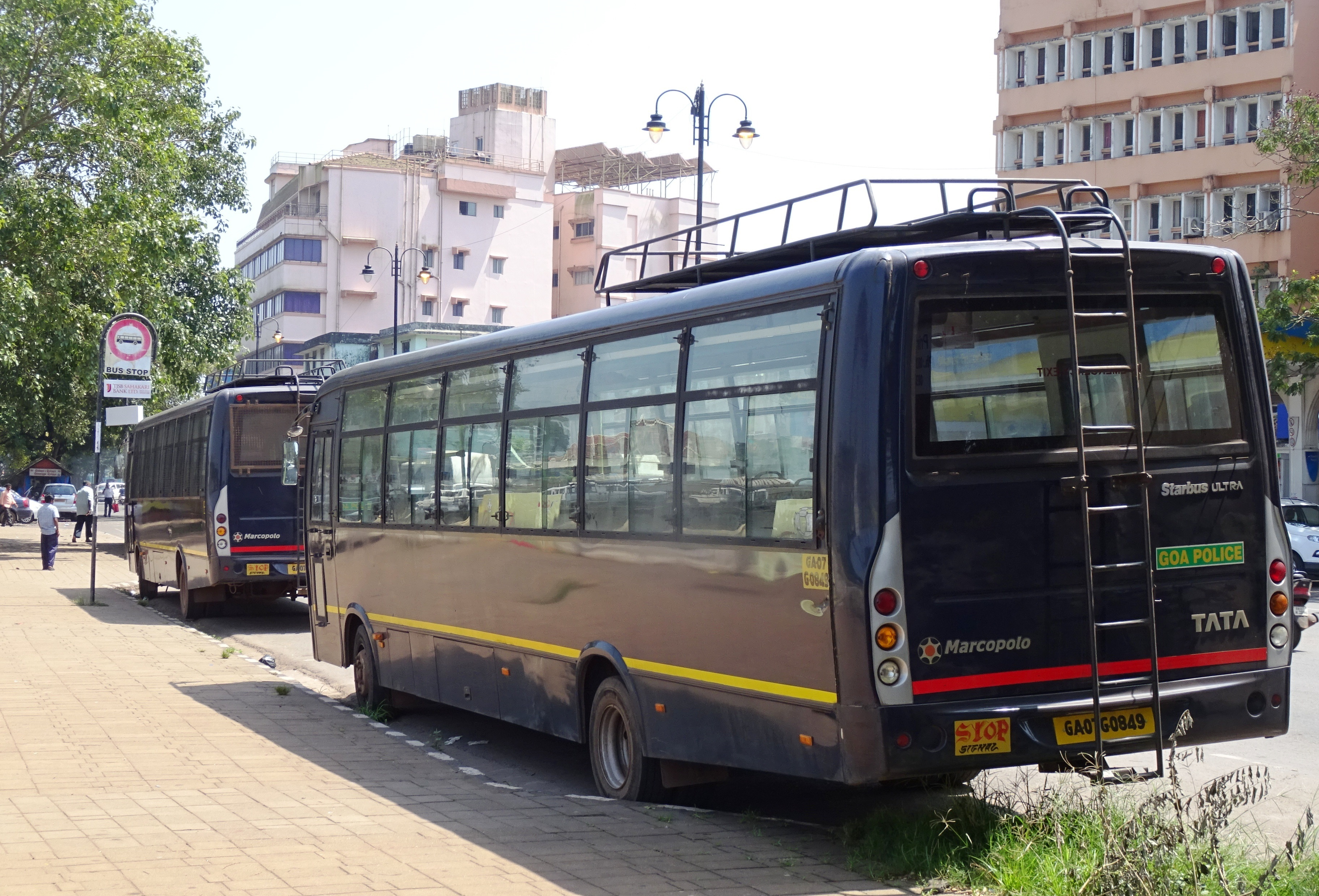
Goa police special vehicle

Until 1946, the police services in Portuguese India were provided by the military gendarmerie force Corpo de Polícia e Fiscalização da Índia (CPFI, India Inspection and Police Corps). In that year, the CPFI was substituted by the civil police force Corpo de Polícia do Estado da Índia (State of India Police Corps), modeled after the Portuguese Public Security Police. The Polícia do Estado da Índia included the public security, judiciary police, transit police, administrative police and civil identification branches.

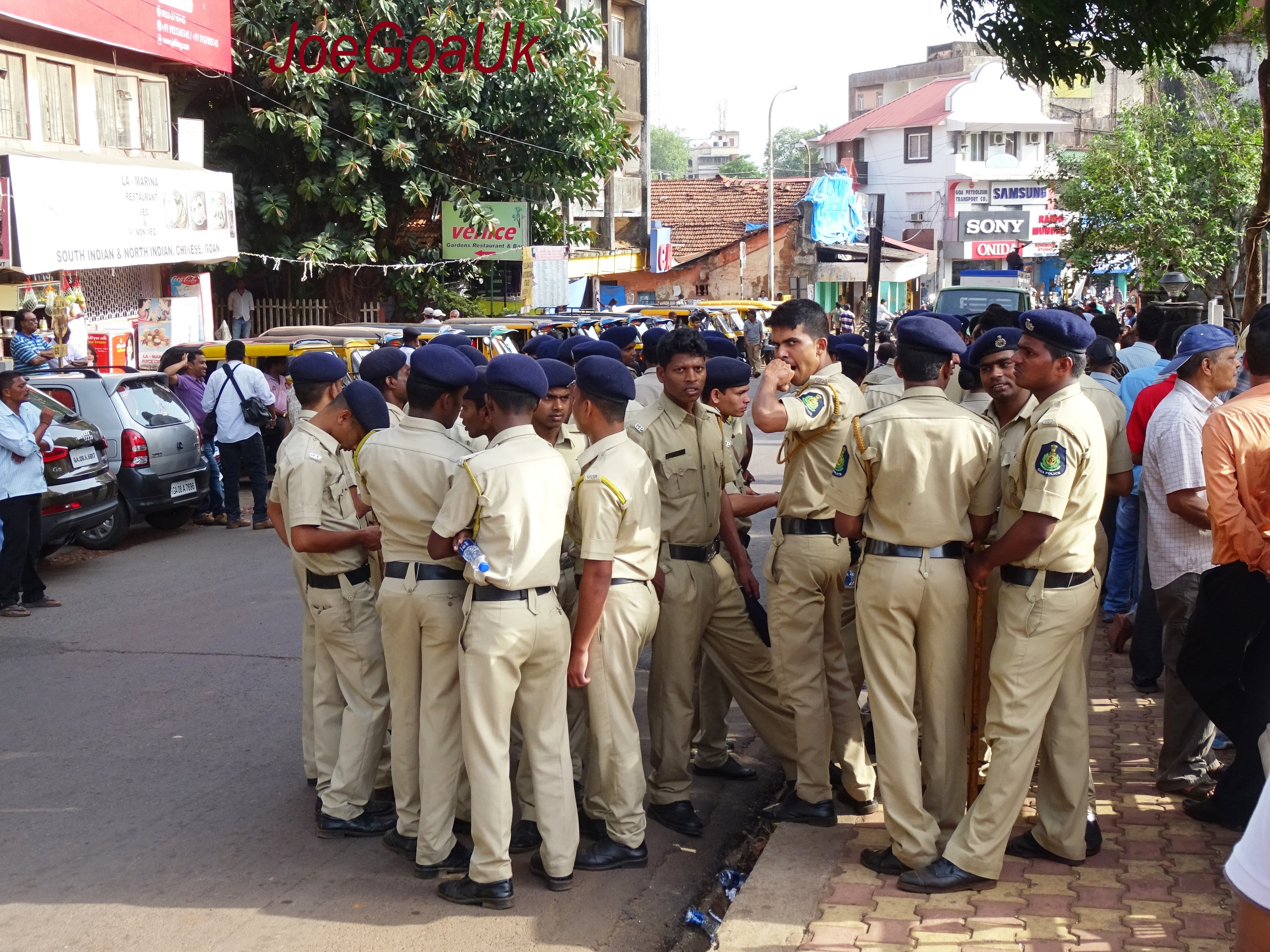
Goa police monitoring a protest

Besides this corps, in Portuguese India also existed the Guarda Fiscal (Fiscal Guard) under the dependency of the Customs Bureau and the Guarda Rural (Rural Guard) under the dependency of the agriculture services.

== Special agencies ==
- Intelligence Unit
- Security Battalion
- Commando Force
