= Panjim Footballers =

Indian association football club in Goa

- Full name: Panjim Footballers Football Club
- Nickname: The Dolphins
- Founded: 1976; 50 years ago
- Ground: Duler Stadium
- Capacity: 10,000
- Head coach: Sadio Vaz
- League: Goa Professional League

Panjim Footballers Club (simply known as Panjim Footballers) is an Indian professional football club based in Panjim, Goa, that competes in the Goa Professional League. Its women's team previously participated in the Indian Women's League, and currently participates in GFA Vedanta Women's League.

== History ==
Established in 1978 as a small city club, Panjim Footballers started playing in inter-village tournaments and GFA age-group tournaments and won many small tournaments.

In 2021, Panjim Footballers won Goa Police Cup, their only major tournament since their inception in 1978. They defeated Dempo SC 1–0 at Duler Stadium in the final.

== Honours ==
=== League ===
- GFA Third Division
  - Champions (1): 2013

=== Cup ===
- Goa Police Cup
  - Champions (1): 2021

=== Women's team ===
- Goa Women's League
  - Champions (1): 2017, 2018
