= FC Goa Reserves and Academy =

Reserve and academy teams of Football Club Goa

- Full name: Football Club Goa Reserves and Academy
- Nickname: The Gaurs
- Short name: FCG
- Founded: 2018; 7 years ago
- Ground: Fatorda Stadium, Margao; GMC Athletic Stadium
- Capacity: 19,000; 3,000
- Owner: Goan Football Club Pvt. Ltd.
- President: Akshay Tandon
- Head coach: Deggie Cardozo
- League: Goa Professional League
- Website: http://www.fcgoa.in/
Home colours	Away colours	Third colours

FC Goa Reserves and Academy is the reserve side and youth academy system of Indian Super League side FC Goa. Based in Goa, the reserve side participated in the I-League 2nd Division, the second division of Indian football, and currently in Goa Professional League and the Youth League (India). The youth teams, which are under 18, under 15 and under 13 squads, participate in various divisions of Elite League.

== History ==
On 20 February 2018, it was announced by the All India Football Federation, the organizing body for Indian football, that the FC Goa, along with six other Indian Super League sides, would field a reserve team in the I-League 2nd Division, India's second division football league. In November 2020, FC Goa tied up with German football club RB Leipzig, to focus on youth development and coach training on a three-year strategic partnership. As part of the deal, coaches from RB Leipzig's Academy will conduct workshops in Goa.

On 8 January 2021, Deggie Cardozo was appointed as the Head coach of FC Goa Reserves.

== Squad ==
As of 30 October 2021

Note: Flags indicate national team as defined under FIFA eligibility rules; some limited exceptions apply. Players may hold more than one non-FIFA nationality.

No.	Pos.	Nation	Player
—	GK	IND	Hansel Coelho
—	GK	IND	Viddhesh Bhonsle
—	DF	IND	Deeshank Kunkalikar
—	DF	IND	Rayan Menezes
—	DF	IND	Lesly Rebello
—	DF	IND	Versly Paes
—	DF	IND	Manushawn Fernandes
—	DF	IND	Kunal Kundaikar
—	DF	IND	Aditya Salgaonkar
—	MF	IND	Malsawmtluanga
—	MF	IND	Brison Fernandes

No.	Pos.	Nation	Player
—	MF	IND	Lalremruata HP
—	MF	IND	Jovial Dias
—	MF	IND	Delton Colaco
—	MF	IND	Jordan Borges
—	MF	IND	Flan Gomes
—	MF	IND	Velroy Fernandes
—	MF	IND	Ivon Costa
—	FW	IND	Vasim Inamdar
—	FW	IND	Mevan Dias
—	FW	IND	Salgeo Dias
—	FW	IND	Britto Pereira

== Current technical staff ==
Position	Name
Head coach	(India) Deggie Cardozo
Technical Director	(India) Derrick Pereira
Director of Football	(India) Ravi Puskur

== Statistics and records ==
=== Season-by-season ===
As of 3 January 2021

Season	I-League 2nd Division								Top Scorer	
Season	P	W	D	L	GF	GA	Pts	Position	Player	Goals
2017–18	10	2	3	5	13	15	9	5th	Liston Colaco; Aaren D'Silva; Lalawmpuia	3
2018–19	8	5	0	3	17	7	15	2nd	Aaren D'Silva	6
2019–20	6	2	3	1	8	6	9	4th	Flan Gomes; Kapil Hoble; Lalawmpuia	2

As of 18 April 2021

Season	Goa Professional League								Top Scorer	
Season	P	W	D	L	GF	GA	Pts	Position	Player	Goals
2017–18	11	4	3	4	18	15	15	5th	Krishna Pandit	6
2018–19	22	17	3	2	54	21	54	1st	Lalawmpuia	10
2019–20	18	9	4	5	36	20	31	5th	Aaren D'Silva	10
2020–21	11	4	4	3	13	11	16	5th	Aaren D'Silva; HP Lalremruata; Joybert Almeida; Kapil Hoble	2

=== Head coaches record ===
As of 13 May 2018

Name	Nationality	From	To	P	W	D	L	GF	GA	Win%
Derrick Pereira	India	6 March 2018	Present	10	2	3	5	13	15	20.00

== Honours ==
=== League ===
- Goa Professional League
  - Winners (1): 2019

=== Cup ===
- Goa Police Cup
  - Winners (1): 2019
- Bandodkar Trophy
  - Winners (1): 2023-24

== See also ==
- FC Goa
