= Sesa Football Academy =

Indian association football academy

- Full name: Sesa Football Academy
- Short name: SFA
- Founded: 1960; 66 years ago (as Sesa Sports Club); 1999; 27 years ago (as Sesa Football Academy)
- Ground: Sircaim Academy Ground, Goa
- Owner: Vedanta Sports
- Head coach: Charles Dias
- League: Indian Football League 2 Goa Professional League
- Website: sesafootballacademy.in
| Home colours | Away colours |

Sesa Football Academy (SFA) is an Indian professional football club based in Sanquelim, Goa. (Note: references) Originally founded in the 1960s as Sesa Sports Club, it currently competes in the Goa Professional League, and had previously participated in the NFL II and the I-League 2nd Division. SFA is a unit of Sesa Community Development Foundation, which is promoted by Vedanta Limited with the objective of service to the community in its operational areas. Sesa is the acronym of Scambi Economici SA Goa, its parent mining company founded in 1954.

SFA began functioning in June 1999. Sesa Football Academy was the champion of the Goa First Division League in 2018–19, gaining its promotion to the Goa Professional League.

== History ==
Sesa Football Academy is the successor of Sesa Sports Club, which was originally founded on 4 September 1960. In 1988, British coach Bob Bootland took charge of Sesa. SFA was later established in 1999 with a vision of becoming a premier academy in India, producing footballers for the Indian national team from the state of Goa. The academy identifies talented youngsters with the passion for football, inducts them into the residential program at the academy, and over a period of four years nurtures and develops them as professional footballers and well-disciplined citizens.

The academy's activities have yielded positive results – seven SFA alumni have played for the national team, and eight players took part in the latest edition of the Indian Super League. Some notable alumni include Adil Khan, Denzil Franco, Micky Fernandes, and Pratesh Shirodkar.

Till date, more than 150 players have benefited from SFA's programs, out of which some have played internationally and many others have represented various prestigious clubs of the country. The team was later managed by legendary Indian coach Armando Colaco. Nigerian Clifford Chukwuma also managed SESA.

The club took part in 2024–25 I-League 3. Their women's section took part in 2024–25 Indian Women's League 2.

== Football programs ==
=== Residential academies ===
Affiliated with the Goa Football Association (GFA), Sesa Football Academy presently runs two fully residential campuses.

Students are also given orientation in sports medicine, physiological assessment and physiotherapy. The academy is AIFF-accredited.

=== Sanquelim campus ===
The Sanquelim campus, with 36 players, is a four-year residential program admitting 18 students every two years. It is built on the Sanquelim reclaimed mine site, with a football ground, well-established gymnasium, and a complete hostel facility along with a recreation center.

=== Sirsaim campus ===
To further nurture the young talent with football training and to provide a disciplined regime, new infrastructure at Sirsaim was inaugurated on 14 February 2010. Constructed at an approximate cost of Rs. 4 crores, it has state of the art infrastructure at international standards. The Sirsaim academy currently has 30 trainees in its four-year residential program, with a batch of 15 trainees admitted every two years.

=== Staff ===
To guide the technical aspects of both academies, Spanish coach Eduard Batlle Basart was roped in as technical director for Sesa Football Academy in 2017. He previously worked with the youth teams at European giants Manchester United and FC Barcelona.

Ex-Indian captain Brahmanand Sankhwalkar has served as chief mentor of Sesa Football Academy.

=== Vedanta Football Schools ===
SFA launched Vedanta Football Schools in 2012 to identify boys from nearby schools under the age of 14, and provide them non-residential football training. This is in line with the larger vision of community development in the areas where Vedanta operates.

=== Vedanta Women's League ===
While working towards the aim of women empowerment through football, Sesa Football Academy launched the Vedanta Women's League in 2017, with the support of Goa Football Association. The league was inaugurated by then Goa Chief Minister Manohar Parrikar in the presence of eminent women's football legends.

The Vedanta Women's League has since completed two seasons, with over 200 girls given an opportunity to play football. The winner of the 2018 edition, Panjim Footballers, went on to play in the Indian Women's League as the sole team from Goa.

== Home ground ==
Sircaim is home to one of the two Sesa Football Academy premises in Goa, the other being at Sanquelim. The Sesa Football Academy Ground is located at Sircaim and use for both training and league matches.

Sesa also used Duler Stadium in Mapusa for some of their Goa Professional League matches.

== Honours ==
=== League ===
- Goa Football League
  - Champions (2): 1967–68, 1972–73
  - Runners-up (1): 2023–24
- Goa First Division
  - Champions (1): 2018–19

=== Cup ===
- Sikkim Governor's Gold Cup
  - Champions (1): 1987
- Bandodkar Gold Trophy
  - Champions (2): 1979, 1980
  - Runners-up (1): 1974
- Rovers Cup
  - Runners-up (1): 1995
- Sait Nagjee Football Tournament
  - Runners-up (1): 1970
- Vitthal Trophy
  - Champions (1): 1989
  - Runners-up (1): 1990
- Goa Police Cup
  - Champions (2): 1970, 2022
- Taça Goa U18 League
  - Runners-up (1): 2017

== Affiliated clubs ==
The following club(s) is/are currently associated with Sesa FA:

- (India) Zinc Football (2018–present)

== See also ==
- List of football clubs in Goa
- List of Goan State Football Champions
