= Goa Football Association =

State governing body of Football in Goa

- Sport: Football
- Jurisdiction: Goa
- Membership: 2 district associations
- Abbreviation: GFA
- Founded: 1959 (as Associação de Futebol de Goa)
- Affiliation: All India Football Federation (AIFF)
- Headquarters: Panaji
- President: Valanka Alemao
- Vice presidents: Antonio Pango (Senior); Jonathan De Sousa
- Secretary: Adlear D'Cruz

Official website
- www.gfagoa.com
- Other key staff: Schubert Furtado (Treasurer)

The Goa Football Association (abbr. GFA) is the governing body of football in Goa. It is affiliated with the All India Football Federation, the national governing body. It sends state teams for Santosh Trophy and Rajmata Jijabai Trophy. The GFA's premier competition is the Goa Professional League.

== History ==
The Goa Football Association (Portuguese: Associação de Futebol de Goa) was founded on 22 December 1959 by Lt. Joao Luis Aranha, a Portuguese policeman and sports administrator stationed in Portuguese India. Until then sports in Goa was organised by Associacao de Futebol da India Portuguesa (1939–1949) and Conselhos de Desportos da India (1949–1959). Aranha became the first president of GFA, with Dr Gustavo Monteiro being the vice president, and Peter Furtado being appointed the first secretary.

The federation conducted its first Goan State League in 1959 also under the name of Goa Primeira Divisão or Goa First Division with Clube Independente de Margao becoming the champions. The GFA then started the Goa Senior League in 1969, which was supposed to be the new first division of Goa, but later disbanded the league. Then for the 1970-71 season they turned the league into a two division First Division, North Division and South Division. They then introduced the a Second Division and Third Division from 1971 to 1972.

The GFA then started the Goa Super Division in 1977 with Salgaocar S.C. being the champions. With football globally continuing to develop at a fast pace, the Goa Football Association decided it was time to push the game onto a higher platform. Goa emerged as the first state in India to go professional.

The GFA then revamped the National State League by forming the Goa Professional League in 1997 with Salgaocar coming out as champions. The Professional League was expanded to six teams from the 2000-01 season, after the GFA increased the competitiveness factor. Since 2002 the league was played as an eight team home-and-away format, making it 14 matches for each club. The GFA then announced that the 2011 season would be played with 10 teams under a new format.

Benaulim MLA Venzy Viegas allocated Rs. 1 lakh from his constituency fund to each GFA-registered club based in Benaulim in September 2026.

== State teams ==
=== Men ===
- Goa football team
- Goa under-20 football team
- Goa under-15 football team
- Goa under-13 football team

=== Women ===
- Goa women's football team
- Goa women's under-19 football team
- Goa women's under-17 football team

== Affiliated district associations ==
Both districts of Goa are affiliated with the Goa Football Association.

No.	Association	District	President
1	North Goa District Football Association	North Goa	
2	South Goa District Football Association	South Goa	

== Competitions ==
=== Club Level ===
==== Men's Senior ====
- Goa Professional League
- GFA First Division League
- GFA Second Division League
- GFA Third Division League
- Bandodkar Trophy
- Goa Police Cup

==== Women's Senior ====
- Goa Women's League

==== Youth ====
- GFA U-18 League Division I
- GFA U-18 League Division II
- GFA U-15 League Division I
- GFA U-13 League Division I
- GFA U-13 League Division II

==== Futsal ====
- Late Jaju GFA Futsal League

== Goa Football League pyramid ==
The Goa Football League consists of the Goa Professional League as highest level, followed by the lower divisions.

Goa Football League
Tier	Division
I _{(Level 5 on Indian football pyramid)}	Goa Professional League; 13 clubs
II _{(Level 6 on Indian football pyramid)}	Goa First Division; 14 clubs
III _{(Level 7 on Indian football pyramid)}	Goa Second Division; 79 clubs Ilhas Zone; Salcete Zone; Bardez Zone; Mormugao Zone
IV _{(Level 8 on Indian football pyramid)}	Goa Third Division; 128 clubs Ilhas Zone; Salcete Zone; Bardez Zone; Mormugao Zone

== See also ==
- List of Indian state football associations
- Football in India
