= Duler Stadium =

Indian association football stadium in the state of Goa

- Interactive map of Duler Stadium
- Location: Mapusa, Goa, India
- Coordinates: 15.598490°N 73.816147°E
- Owner: Goa Football Association
- Capacity: 10,000
- Surface: AstroTurf
- Field size: 105x65m

Tenant
- Goa Professional League

Duler Stadium, officially Duler Football Stadium, is a football stadium in Mapusa, Goa, India. Dempo, Salgaocar, and Sporting Goa were the most notable venue users. It also serves as home ground for other Goa Professional League clubs.

== History ==
=== Kingfisher sponsoring ===
In 2009, the Goa Football Association agreed to a deal with giants Kingfisher to rename the Duler Stadium to the Kingfisher Stadium, but in January 2009, the land owners protested, as the stadium belongs to the Mapusa Communidade.

=== Renovation ===
In 2012, the Goa Football Association approved revamping the Duler Stadium by adding a new AstroTurf. On 10 June it was announced that FIFA had officially approved the move, as part of the Win in India with India program.

== See also ==
- List of football stadiums in India
- Lists of stadiums
