= Goans in football =

This page is about Goan achievers in the world of sport. Goa is a tiny region along the west coast of India, and is known for its many athletes, in particular association football (soccer).

== Background ==
The first Goan to have played for India, representing Goa, is Menino Figueiredo, who represented India on a goodwill tour of Russia in 1963. This tour is not considered an official tour and some say the first Goan to have represented India thus becomes Visitacao Lobo in 1970.

== Captains for India ==
Brahmanand Shankhwalkar, Bruno Coutinho, Mauricio Afonso, and Roberto Fernandes have captained the Indian senior national team.

Seby Antao and Lawrence Gomes have captained the India national youth team.

== Senior internationals ==
Long before 19 December 1961, the day Portuguese colonial rule ended in Goa, Goans had made a mark in Indian football. Many represented India by playing for Bombay and shining at the domestic level, thus earning international caps.

In the list below, names of Goans who have represented India in international matches are included, with the name of the domestic team in parentheses.

- Neville D'Souza: 1953 (Bombay)
- Anthony Braganza: 1954 (Bombay)
- Joe D'Sa: 1954 (Bombay)
- Fortunato Franco: 1960 (Bombay)
- Derek D'Souza: 1960 (Bombay)
- Menino Figueiredo: 1963
- Marto Gracias: 1967 (Bombay)
- Andrew D'Souza: 1968
- Visitacao Lobo: 1970
- Ramesh Redkar: 1973
- Nicholas Pereira: 1973
- Bernard Pereira: 1973
- Brahmanand Sankhwalkar: 1976
- Arnold Rodrigues: 1977
- Prakash Naik: 1977
- Armando Colaco: 1977
- Francis D'Souza: 1978
- Anthony Rebello: 1982
- Jose D'Souza: 1983
- Camilo Gonsalves: 1983
- Bento Andrew: 1983
- Mahesh Lotlikar: 1983
- Chandrakant Naik: 1984
- Mauricio Afonso: 1984
- Arnold Rodrigues: 1984
- Anthony D'Souza: 1984
- Ashok Fadte: 1984
- Ignatius Dias: 1984
- Derrick Pereira: 1984
- Savio Medeira: 1987
- Lawrence Gomes: 1984
- Johnny Araujo: 1987
- Lector Mascarenhas: 1989
- Norbert Gonsalves: 1989
- Mario Soares: 1989
- Bruno Coutinho: 1991
- Roy Barretto: 1992
- Francis Silveira: 1993
- Roberto Fernandez: 1996
- Francis Coelho: 1996
- Franky Barretto: 1997
- Jules Alberto: 1999
- Mahesh Gawli: 1999
- Anthony Pereira: 2000
- Roque Barreto: 2000
- Alvito D'Cunha: 2001
- Alex Ambrose: 2002
- Samir Naik: 2002
- Selwyn Fernandes: 2003
- Climax Lawrence: 2003
- Felip Gomes: 2005
- Bibiano Fernandes: 2005
- Clifford Miranda: 2005
- Micky Fernandes: 2006
- Fredy Mascarenhas: 2006
- Denzil Franco: 2010
- Joaquim Abranches: 2011
- Francis Fernandes: 2011
- Peter Carvalho: 2011
- Rowilson Rodrigues: 2011
- Valeriano Rebello: 2011
- Lenny Rodrigues: 2012
- Adil Khan: 2012
- Dawson Fernandes: 2013
- Victorino Fernandes: 2013
- Rowllin Borges: 2015
- Augustin Fernandes: 2015
- Cavin Lobo: 2015
- Romeo Fernandes: 2015
- Fulganco Cardozo: 2016
- Brandon Fernandes: 2019
- Mandar Rao Dessai: 2019
- Liston Colaco: 2021
- Glan Martins: 2021
- Seriton Fernandes: 2021
- Irfan Yadwad: 2024
- Brison Fernandes: 2025
- Albino Gomes: 2026
- Nathan Rodrigues: 2026

== Junior national teams ==
The following have represented Indian junior national teams in age-group tournaments but not represented the senior national team:

- Lawrence Gomes in 1982 for India u-19 Asian Youth Championships Captain
- Seby Antao in 1988 for India u-19
- Alex Alvares in 1991 for India U-21
- Victor Lobo in 1995 for India U-23
- Melwyn Rodrigues in 1998 for India u-21
- Covan Lawrence in 1998 for India U-19
- Milagrio Madeira in 2001 for India U-19
- Godwin Franco in 2003 for India U-19
- Garry D'Mello in 2004 for India U-19
- Marcelino Dias in 2004 for India U-18
- Bernard Pires in 2005 for India U-23
- Cliffton Gonsalves in 2005 for India U-20
- Terence Lobo in 2005 for India U-20
- Laxmikant Kattimani in 2005 for India U-20
- Steven Fernandes in 2005 for India U-20
- Joshuah Vaz in 2005 for India U-16
- Franco Fernandes in 2006 for India U-14
- Beevan D'Mello in 2006 for India U-20
- Branco Cardozo - (TFA Jamshedpur) in 2006 played for India U-19
- Shallum Pires in 2006 for India U-14
- Lavino Fernandes in 2006 for India U-20
- Myron Mendes in 2009 for India U-14
- Albino Gomes in 2009 for India U-16
- Meldon D'Silva in 2009 for India U-16
- Anthony Barbosa in 2011 for India U-23
- Prathamesh Maulingkar in 2012 for India U-22

== India schools ==
The following have played for India schools only and not for any other junior national team:

- Inacio Fernandes
- Michael Gomes
- Casmiro Palha
- Joaquim Palha
- Peter Santamaria-Woods
