= List of India national football team managers =

This article lists the India national football team managers/head coaches, the post which was incorporated in 1938 with the appointment of Pankaj Gupta for their tour to Australia. Balaidas Chatterjee became the first manager of the national team in post-independent India, who guided the nation at the 1948 Summer Olympics in London.

== Overview ==
Since India's independence, there have been twenty-nine different head coaches for the national team, out of which eleven foreign. The most successful head coach for India was Syed Abdul Rahim, who led India to gold in both the 1951 and 1962 Asian Games while also achieving a fourth-place finish during the 1956 Summer Olympics. The most successful foreign head coaches for India were Bob Houghton and Stephen Constantine; both of them helped the team to qualify for AFC Asian Cup. With Houghton in charge from 2006 to 2011,

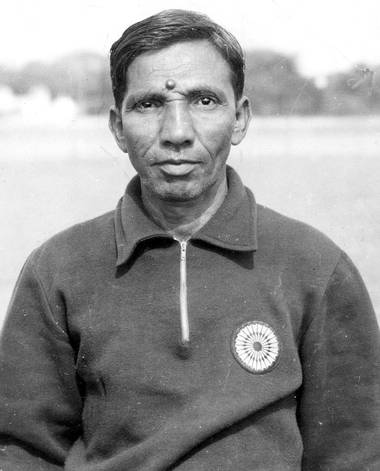
Syed Abdul Rahim, the most successful Indian coach for the national team.

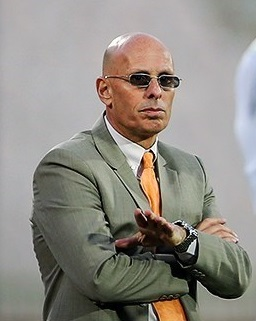
Stephen Constantine has been one of the most successful foreign coaches for the national team.

India won the Nehru Cup twice and the AFC Challenge Cup in 2008 which allowed India to participate in their first AFC Asian Cup for 27 years. Since Houghton resigned as India team Head coach in 2011, the India national team's FIFA ranking touched its lowest at 173 in the team history in March 2015, but Constantine, who was appointed for the second time as the head coach of India, revived the Indian team from its meagre condition. Under him, the team remained unbeaten for two years from June 2016 to March 2018 winning 11 matches and drawn 2 matches, which helped them to qualify for 2019 AFC Asian Cup after 8 years since Houghton left. He also helped the team to reach a better FIFA ranking of 96 in July 2017, which was the best in last 21 years.

== List of managers ==
Managers in italics took charge as caretaker or interim manager

- (British Raj) Pankaj Gupta (1938)
- (India) Balaidas Chatterjee (1948)
- (India) Syed Abdul Rahim (1951–1952)
- (India) Balaidas Chatterjee (1953)
- (India) Syed Abdul Rahim (1954)
- (India) Balaidas Chatterjee (1954)
- (England) Bert Flatley (1955)
- (India) Saroj Bose (1955)
- (India) Syed Abdul Rahim (1956–1962)
- (India) T. Shome (1958)
- (India) Sailendra Nath Manna (1961)
- (India) G. M. Pentiah (1963)
- (England) Harry Wright (1964)
- (India) Mohammed Hussain (1964–1967)
- (India) Sachindranath Mitra (1966)
- (India) S. R. Deb (1967)
- (India) Sailendra Nath Manna (1968)
- (India) Jarnail Singh (1969)
- (India) G. M. H. Basha (1970–1971)
- (India) Pradip Kumar Banerjee (1971–1974)
- (India) J. Krishnaswamy (1974)
- (India) G. M. H. Basha (1975)
- (India) Jarnail Singh (1976)
- (India) Sahu Mewalal (1977)
- (India) G. M. H. Basha (1977)
- (India) Arun Ghosh (1978)
- (India) Jarnail Singh (1980)
- (India) Pradip Kumar Banerjee (1981–1982)
- (England) Bob Bootland (1982)
- (India) Muhammad Salaam (1983)
- (Republic of Ireland) Joe Kinnear (1983)
- (Socialist Federal Republic of Yugoslavia) Milovan Ćirić (1983–1985)
- (India) Arun Ghosh (1984)
- (India) Arun Ghosh (1985)
- (India) Pradip Kumar Banerjee (1985–1986)
- (India) Syed Nayeemuddin (1987−1989)
- (India) Amal Dutta (1987)
- (India) Anjan Chowdhury (1989)
- (Hungary) József Gelei (1990–1991)
- (India) Derek D'Souza (1992–1993)
- (Czech Republic) Jiří Pešek (1993−1994)
- (Uzbekistan) Rustam Akramov (1995−1996)
- (India) Syed Nayeemuddin (1997–1998)
- (India) Sukhwinder Singh (1999–2001)
- (Uzbekistan) Islam Ahmedov (2001)
- (England) Stephen Constantine (2002–2005)
- (India) Sukhwinder Singh (2005)
- (India) Syed Nayeemuddin (2005–2006)
- (England) Bob Houghton (2006–2011)
- (India) Armando Colaco (2011)
- (India) Savio Medeira (2011–2012)
- (Netherlands) Wim Koevermans (2012–2015)
- (England) Stephen Constantine (2015–2019)
- (Croatia) Igor Štimac (2019−2024)
- (Spain) Manolo Márquez (2024−2025)
- (India) Khalid Jamil (2025−)
- (India) Naushad Moosa (2026)

== Managerial records ==
As of match played on 15 November 2026

- Only International A matches considered.
- List also includes managers who took charge of the national team in senior unofficial matches.
- "Period" indicates the timespan of the first and last matches in charge, which may include periods not in charge of the national team

Manager	Period	Record				
Manager	Period	Matches	Won	Draw	Lost	Win %
(British Raj) Pankaj Gupta	1938	5	1	1	3	20
(India) Balaidas Chatterjee	1948, 1953, 1954	6	4	0	2	66.67
(India) Syed Abdul Rahim	1951–1962	35	17	7	11	48.57
(England) Bert Flatley (caretaker)	1955	–	–	–	–	–
(India) Saroj Bose	1955	3	3	0	0	100
(India) T. Shome	1958	5	2	0	3	40
(India) Sailen Manna	1961, 1968	9	3	1	5	33.33
(India) G. M. Pentaiah	1963	2	2	0	0	100
(England) Harry Wright	1963–1964	5	2	0	3	40
(India) Mohammed Hussain	1964–1967	18	6	6	6	33.33
(India) Sachindranath Mitra	1966	5	4	0	1	80
(India) S. R. Deb	1967	3	0	1	2	0
(India) Jarnail Singh	1969, 1976, 1980	3	1	0	2	33.33
(India) G. M. H. Basha	1971, 1975, 1977	20	7	2	11	35
(India) P. K. Banerjee	1971–1974, 1981–1982, 1985–1986	35	7	10	18	20
(India) J. Krishnaswamy	1974	4	1	2	1	25
(India) Sheoo Mewalal	1977	4	2	1	1	50
(India) Arun Ghosh	1978, 1984, 1985	16	4	3	9	25
(England) Bob Bootland	1982	–	–	–	–	–
(India) Muhammad Salaam	1983	–	–	–	–	–
(Republic of Ireland) Joe Kinnear	1983	–	–	–	–	–
(Socialist Federal Republic of Yugoslavia) Milovan Ćirić	1983–1985	13	3	1	9	23.08
(India) Syed Nayeemuddin	1987–1989, 1997–1998, 2005–06	25	8	5	12	32
(India) Amal Dutta	1987	3	2	1	0	66.67
(India) Anjan Chowdhury	1989	2	1	1	0	50
(Hungary) József Gelei	1990–1991	1	0	0	1	0
(India) Derek D'Souza	1992–1993	2	1	0	1	50
(Czech Republic) Jiří Pešek	1993–1994	22	5	7	10	22.73
(Uzbekistan) Rustam Akramov	1995–1996	13	4	4	5	30.77
(Uzbekistan) Islam Ahmedov	2001	1	0	0	1	0
(England) Stephen Constantine	2002–2005	18	4	5	9	22.22
(India) Sukhwinder Singh	2005	5	1	1	3	20
(England) Bob Houghton	2006–2011	44	14	6	24	31.82
(India) Armando Colaco (interim)	2011	5	0	2	3	0
(India) Savio Medeira	2011–2012	13	5	2	6	38.46
(Netherlands) Wim Koevermans	2012–2014	20	7	5	8	35
(England) Stephen Constantine	2015–2019	42	23	6	13	54.76
(England) Stephen Constantine	total	60	27	11	22	45
(Croatia) Igor Štimac	2019–2024	53	19	14	20	35.85
(Spain) Manolo Márquez	2024–2025	8	1	4	3	12.5
(India) Khalid Jamil	2025–	17	2	5	10	11.76
(India) Naushad Moosa (interim)	2026	3	3	0	0	100

== See also ==
- History of the India national football team
