= Brahmanand Sankhwalkar =

Indian footballer (born 1954)

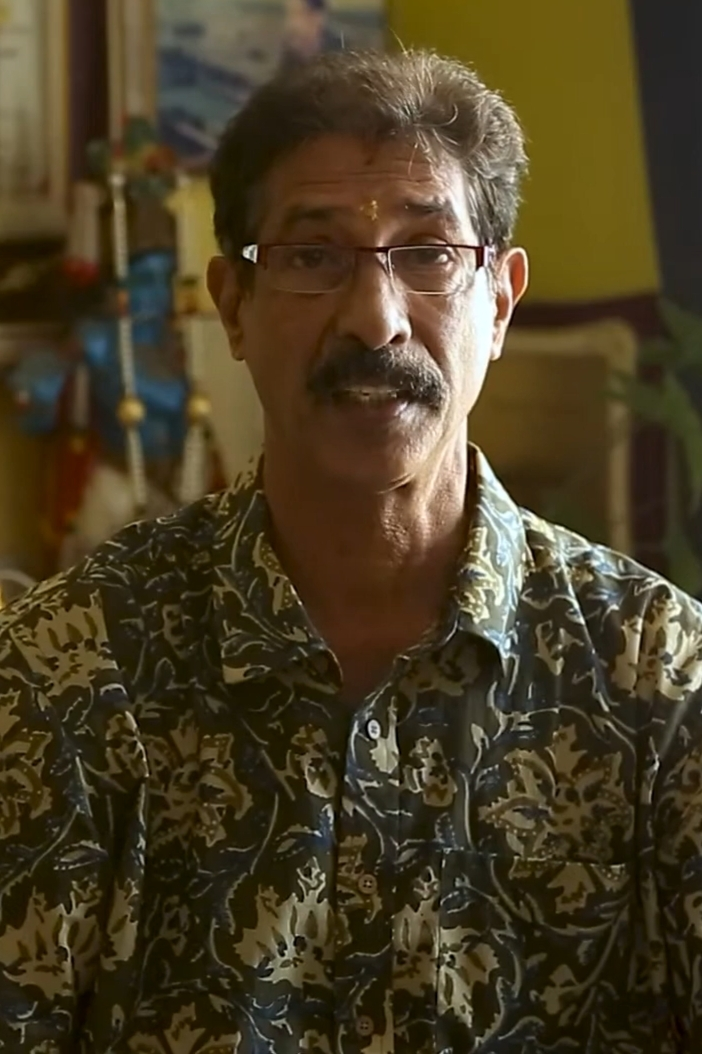
- Sankhwalkar in 2022

Personal information
- Full name: Brahmanand Sagoon Kamat Sankhwalkar
- Date of birth: 6 March 1954 (age 72)
- Place of birth: Taleigão, Goa, Portuguese India
- Height: 1.88 m (6 ft 2 in)
- Position: Goalkeeper

Youth career
- 1971–1974: Panvel Sports Club

Senior career*
Years	Team	Apps	(Gls)
1974–1991	Salgaocar		
1991–1994	Churchill Brothers		
1994–1995	Anderson Mariners		

International career
1975–?	India		
- * Club domestic league appearances and goals

Brahmanand Sagoon Kamat Sankhwalkar (born 6 March 1954) is an Indian former footballer and a captain of the Indian team from 1983 to 1986, who played as a goalkeeper. Considered one of India's best goalkeepers, he had 25-year playing career. He played for Panvel Sports Club, Salgaocar, Churchill Brothers, Anderson Mariners at the club level, that included 17 years with Salgaocar, and for Goa state team in the Santosh Trophy. Playing for Goa, he led the team to two consecutive wins at the Santosh Trophy; in 1983 and 1984. Having maintained a clean sheet of 576 minutes in the 1984 tournament, he holds the Indian record.

The All India Football Federation named him the player of the decade, for the 1985–1995 decade. Recognizing his contribution to Indian football, he was awarded the Arjuna Award by the government of India in 1997.

== Childhood and early career ==
Sankhwalkar was born on 6 March 1954, in Taleigão, Portuguese Goa. He inherited the love for football at a young age from his father Seguna Sankhwalkar and their family doctor Alvaro Pinto, with the latter telling Sankhwalkar stories about famous goalkeepers and showing him the basic football techniques. He played as forward during his school days. His elder brother Vallabh, a footballer played at the local Panvel Sports Club.

=== Panvel Sports Club ===
Sankhwalkar began his career in professional football in 1971. When he began playing for the Panvel Sports Club when an official asked his brother, who was playing with the same club at the time, for a makeshift goalkeeper, in the absence of their regular goalkeepers. Two weeks later, he was signed by the club. He made his debut against Goa Shipyard, with his team winning the match 6–3. In 1974, as a 21-year-old, he captained the team to its first Bandodkar Gold Trophy win, beating SESA Goa 2–0 in the final.

== Club career ==
=== Salgaocar ===
Following the race to sign him by Dempo in the 1973–74 season, he was eventually signed by Salgaocar in 1974, at the Goan First Division League. Sankhwalkar won his first league in his first season with the club in 1974–75. He was made the captain of the team in 1975 and led the team for three consecutive seasons since. With Sankhwalkar in his prime, the team won the league in the renamed Goan Super League, in 1977. Former footballer T. Shanmugam arrived at Salgaocar as coach in 1979, which turned to be a turning point in his career. Between 1981 and 1985, Salgaocar won the league four times, with Sankhwalkar reaching his peak during the time and also became a regular member in the national squad. The team also won the Bandodkar Gold Trophy in 1983, Nehru Gold Cup in 1984 and finished second at the Rovers Cup in 1985.

Salgaocar broke into the national scene in the second half of the 1980s winning many trophies. It reached the final of the Federation Cup in 1987, eventually losing 0–2 to Mohun Bagan. In the process, it became the first Goan club to reach the finals of a Federation Cup. The following year, the team won the Sait Nagjee Trophy beating Mohammedan S.C. in the final. The team achieved a hat-trick of Federation Cup finals in 1989, and in the year became the first team outside Bengal to defend the title, following their 1988 win. Sankhwalkar kept clean sheets in back to back finals. In 1989, it reached the final of the Cup for a fourth consecutive time, losing to the Kerala Police team in the final. In the 1989–90, Salgaocar won its first Rovers Cup, beating Dempo in the final. His career with Salgaocar ended in 1991, following which he signed with Churchill Brothers, another Goan club.

=== Goa ===
Following his impressive performances with the Panvel Sports Club, Sankhwalkar was picked to play for the Goa state team in the 1974–75 Santosh Trophy in Jalandhar. He was appreciated for not conceding a goal against Punjab who then went on to win the final against Bengal 6–0. Goa lost 1–2 to Bengal in the semifinal. With the team, he reached his first Santosh Trophy final in 1979, when Goa lost to Bengal 0–1. Under his captaincy, Goa reached the final again in 1983, to face Bengal. Following to non-scoring draw games, they were declared joint winners. The following year, Goa was grouped with Karnataka, Tamil Nadu and Punjab. Winning two out of three group matches, Goa finished as group toppers. Facing Kerala in the semifinals, Goa won 6–0 on aggregate. They faced Punjab in the finals in Madras (now Chennai), beating them 1–0, to win its first Santosh Trophy. Sankhwalkar finished the tournament without having conceded a single goal, and for 576 minutes, a record.

=== Stint at Churchill Brothers and retirement ===
After a career of 17 years with Salgaocar, Sankhwalkar was signed by Churchill Brothers. Following a four-year stint with the club, he played for his village club, Anderson Mariners till 1995. He retired from professional football in 1995, after a 25-year career.

== International career ==
Sankhwalkar was first picked in the national side in 1975, following his success at the club level. He played for the team at the AFC Youth Championship in Kuwait in that year and also the following year. He was a part of the team that participated at the Marah Alim Cup in Kabul in 1976 and 1977, the Merdeka Cup in 1976, 1981, 1982 and 1986. He was also included in the squad that took part in the King's Cup in Bangkok in 1977, and the President's Cup in Seoul, in 1977 and 1982. Following India's successful Zambia Goodwill tour, he was given the nickname "Leopard". Following a few international tour games, he was made the captain at the Nehru Cup in 1983 and led the team till 1986. Also, around the time, Sankhwalkar had to compete with Bhaskar Ganguly for a place in the team. He was a part of the team that competed at the 1986 Asian Games in Seoul, and also captained the team against the visiting Bochum XI side from Germany, in 1986. He finished his international career with over 50 caps.

== Later life ==
Following his career as a player, Sankhwalkar completed the AFC A, B & C license exams to qualify as a coach. He also earned his coaching diploma from Asian Coaching School in Malaysia under Deitmar Crammer and Bill Bingham. He served as the goalkeeping coach of India from 1997 to 2005. He then coached the Indian under-23 side.

In 1997, he was awarded the Arjuna Award by the government of India recognizing his contribution to Indian football. In the process, he became the first Goan footballer to win the award. Sankhwalkar later served as chief mentor of the Sesa Football Academy of Goa.

== Honours ==
Panvel

- Bandodkar Gold Trophy: 1974

Salgaocar

- Goa First Division: 1974–75, 1975–76, 1977–78, 1981–82, 1982–83, 1984–85, 1985–86, 1988–89, 1990–91
- Federation Cup: 1988, 1989; runner-up: 1987, 1990
- Rovers Cup: 1989–90; runner-up: 1985
- Bordoloi Trophy runner-up: 1985
- Sait Nagjee Football Tournament: 1988; runner-up: 1985, 1989
- Bandodkar Gold Trophy: 1981, 1988, 1992; runner-up: 1970, 1979, 1982, 1984, 1990
- Puttiah Memorial Trophy: 1978; runner-up: 1977

Goa

- Santosh Trophy: 1982–83, 1983–84

India

- Afghanistan Republic Day Cup third place: 1976, 1977
- King's Cup third place: 1977

Individual

- Arjuna Award: 1997
- Padma Shri: 2022
- AIFF Player of the Decade: 1985–95
- Featured in Limca Book of Records of 1993 edition for contributions to football

== See also ==
- Goans in football
- List of India national football team captains
- History of the India national football team

== Bibliography ==
- Kapadia, Novy (2017). Barefoot to Boots: The Many Lives of Indian Football. Penguin Random House. ISBN 978-0-143-42641-7.
- Martinez, Dolores; Mukharjiim, Projit B (2009). Football: From England to the World: The Many Lives of Indian Football. Routledge. ISBN 978-1-138-88353-6. Archived from the original on 2 July 2022.
- Nath, Nirmal (2011). History of Indian Football: Upto 2009–10. Readers Service. ISBN 9788187891963. Archived from the original on 22 July 2022.
- Dineo, Paul; Mills, James (2001). Soccer in South Asia: Empire, Nation, Diaspora. London, United Kingdom: Frank Cass Publishers. ISBN 978-0-7146-8170-2. Archived from the original on 25 July 2022.
- Majumdar, Boria; Bandyopadhyay, Kausik (2006). A Social History Of Indian Football: Striving To Score. Routledge. ISBN 9780415348355. Archived from the original on 29 June 2021.
- Basu, Jaydeep (2003). Stories from Indian Football. UBS Publishers' Distributors. ISBN 9788174764546. Archived from the original on 11 October 2022.
