= Filipe Gomes =

Filipe Gomes can refer to:

- Filipe (footballer, born 1987)
- Filipe Gomes (swimmer)

== See also ==
- Felipe Gomes (disambiguation)
- Felip Gomes (born 1978), Indian football defender
