= List of Salgaocar S.C. managers =

This is a list of Salgaocar Sports Club's managers and their records, from 2001, when the first professional manager was appointed, to the present day.

== Managers ==
Information correct as of 13 November 2012. Only competitive matches are counted. Wins, losses and draws are results at the final whistle; the results of penalty shoot-outs are not counted.

Picture	Name	Nationality	From	To	P	W	D	L	Win%	Honours
	Savio Medeira	India	2001	2008	135	44	45	46	32.59	
	Tim Hankinson	United States	2009	2010	26	8	9	9	30.77	
	Karim Bencherifa	Morocco	2010	2012	Unknown					1 I-League
	David Booth	England	13 November 2012	Present	1	0	0	1	0.00	
