= Jarnail Singh (footballer) =

Indian footballer

Personal information
- Full name: Jarnail Singh Dhillon
- Date of birth: 20 February 1936
- Place of birth: Lyallpur, Punjab Province, British India (now in Punjab, Pakistan)
- Date of death: 13 October 2000 (aged 64)
- Place of death: Vancouver, British Columbia, Canada
- Height: 1.80 m (5 ft 11 in)
- Position: Centre-back

Senior career*
Years	Team	Apps	(Gls)
1956–1957	Khalsa Sporting Club		
1958	Rajasthan Club		
1959–1967	Mohun Bagan		

International career
- India

Managerial career
- 1969: India
- 1974–1976: Punjab
- 1976–1977: India
- 1980: India
Medal record
Men's football
Representing India
Asian Games
Gold medal – first place	1962 Jakarta	Team
AFC Asian Cup
Runner-up	1964 Israel	Team
- * Club domestic league appearances and goals

Jarnail Singh Dhillon (Punjabi: [dʒəɾnɛːl sɪ́ŋɡ ʈìlːõː]) was a former Indian football player, who played as a centre-back. He was the captain of the India national football team from 1965 to 1967. He was given the Arjuna Award in 1964 for his achievements as a football player. He also competed in the men's tournament at the 1960 Summer Olympics. Considered as one of Asia's best defenders in the 1960s, he spent most of his career in Mohun Bagan.

== Club career ==
After representing the football team of Khalsa College of mahilpur from 1952 to 1956, Singh began his senior club career in 1956 at Khalsa Sporting Club of Shri Guru Gobind Singh Khalsa College in Hoshiarpur district of Punjab. With the club, he appeared in DCM Trophy. He then captained Punjab University football team before arriving in Calcutta. In 1958, he went on to play for Rajasthan Club, nicknamed "giant killers" in Kolkata Maidan. Darshan Singh, who played for Rajasthan at that time, helped Singh to complete his transfer.

It was very difficult to get past him in a one on one situation. He was a tough player at nearly six feet.

— Gautam Roy, football historian, on Jarnail Singh to the Olympic Channel.

He was brought in Calcutta giants Mohun Bagan by then head coach Arun Sinha, and signed for the club in 1959. He then represented the team for ten long years until 1968. He also captained the team from 1965 to 1967. His performance against East Bengal in a match of the Kolkata Derby in 1968, was highly praised by one of India's oldest newspaper Amrita Bazar Patrika. With "the mariners", he formed an incredible partnership with Chuni Goswami, brought several laurels for the century-old club by winning the Calcutta Football League six times, IFA Shield and Durand Cup four times. Singh was also part of the Mohun Bagan team that toured to East Africa and played matches in Uganda, Kenya, Zanzibar and Tanganyika.

Singh also represented Bengal at the Santosh Trophy and won it in 1958–59, 1959–60, 1962–63, and 1969–70, before appearing with Punjab in the same competition. He also won the 1970–71 Santosh Trophy with Punjab in Jalandhar, defeating Mysore.

== International career ==
Singh represented India under management of the coach Syed Abdul Rahim, during the "Golden age" of Indian football.

He joined the national team during India's Afghanistan tour in 1959 but not appeared in matches. He played in 1960 Summer Olympics in Rome, and played against some notable players like Flórián Albert of Hungary. He was prominent in the defense as India was narrowly defeated by Hungary by 2–1, and drew 1–1 with mighty France. He then appeared in 1961 Merdeka Cup in Malaysia under coaching of Sailen Manna. Later in the 1962 Asian Games in Jakarta, Singh won the gold medal with India. In the final, Rahim showcased his brilliance, deploying injured Singh as centre forward. According to P. K. Banerjee, Jarnail used to play as a centre-forward in his college days and Rahim's research helped the team surprise the opponent, a 2–1 victory over South Korea.

In 1964 Merdeka Cup, he was part of Indian team that finished runners-up. In the same year, he went on to play for his country at the 1964 AFC Asian Cup, where they also finished as runners-up as Israel won the trophy. From 1965 to 1967, he captained the national team.

== Managerial career ==
Singh took charge of India and managed the team in 1969 Merdeka Cup, and 1970 Singapore Friendship Tournament. He again managed India at Afghanistan Republic Day Festival Cup in 1976, as well as for the following edition of the tournament.

He became coach of the Punjab football team in Santosh Trophy and managed players like Inder Singh, Sukhwinder Singh and others. Under his coaching, Punjab won title in 1974–75. In the final of that edition, his team thrashed Bengal 6–0. Inder Singh emerged as top scorer of the tournament with 23 goals which is still a record, and Punjab also finished having scored 46 goals.

== Personal life ==
Singh was a victim of the Partition of India. When he was in Lyallpur (now Faisalabad in Pakistan) in 1948, the place was burning due to political madness, and many of his family members were killed. He escaped from that situation and traveled to Amritsar by truck cramped with at least 50 other men, women and children.

Jarnail's son Jagmohan Singh was also a professional footballer who played for India as a defender and participated in 1993 SAARC Gold Cup in Pakistan. After Jagmohan's tragic death in 1996, Singh settled in Canada.

== Outside football ==
Singh was elected as Deputy Director of Sports of the Government of Punjab and worked between 1985 and 1990, and also acted as Director between 1990 and 1994.

== Death ==
He died at the age of 64 due to an asthmatic disorder on 13 October 2000 at Vancouver in Canada.

== Honours ==
=== Player ===
Mohun Bagan

- Durand Cup: 1959, 1960, 1963, 1964, 1965
- IFA Shield: 1960, 1961, 1962, 1967
- Rovers Cup: 1966
- Calcutta Football League: 1959, 1960, 1962, 1963, 1964, 1965

India

- Asian Games Gold medal: 1962
- AFC Asian Cup runners-up: 1964
- Merdeka Tournament runners-up: 1964; third-place: 1965, 1966

Bengal

- Santosh Trophy: 1958–59, 1959–60, 1962–63, 1969–70

Punjab

- Santosh Trophy: 1970–71

Individual

- AFC Asian All Stars: 1965, 1966, 1967
- Arjuna Award: 1964
- Mohun Bagan Ratna: 2012
- The Indian Express India's Most Popular Sportsman: 1960
- Sportskeeda All time Indian Football XI

Records

- Only Indian footballer to be selected as captain of the Asian All Star Football Team in 1966.

=== Manager ===
India

- Afghanistan Republic Day Cup third place: 1976, 1977

== Legacy ==
Jarnail Singh is the best defender in India in the last 60–70 years. He is a giant of Indian football and I have a lot of respect for him. I have seen him playing also, his skills, tackling, sliding tackle, the timing of it, volley clearance, it was unmatchable. He used to play as a central defender and in those times only two defenders used to be deployed, later three defenders were used. Those two defenders have to cover the area of 55 yards against five attackers. It was almost impossible to beat him in a one-on-one situation, not even Chunni da (Chuni Goswami) could do it.

— Subrata Bhattacharya, Indian defender, on Jarnail Singh.

In memory of Singh, the I-League "Best Defender Award" is renamed as "Jarnail Singh Award", given to the best defender in each season by the All India Football Federation (AIFF), in collaboration with Football Players' Association of India.

Without doubt, he is the best defender that India have ever produced. There's no comparison. Jarnail Singh was the most intimidating defender in Asia, forget about India. His tackling, interception and man-to-man marking were immaculate. He was somebody who intimidated his opponents.

— Novy Kapadia, football expert and veteran journalist, on Jarnail Singh.

In memory of Singh, a knockout football tournament named Jarnail Singh Memorial Football Tournament has been hosted in Garshankar, Punjab.

== See also ==
- Arjuna award recipients among Indian footballers
- List of India national football team captains
- List of India national football team managers
- History of the India national football team
- List of India international footballers born outside India
- List of association football families

== Bibliography ==
- Kapadia, Novy (2017). Barefoot to Boots: The Many Lives of Indian Football. Penguin Random House. ISBN 978-0-143-42641-7.
- Martinez, Dolores; Mukharjiim, Projit B (2009). Football: From England to the World: The Many Lives of Indian Football. Routledge. ISBN 978-1-138-88353-6. Archived from the original on 2 July 2022.
- Nath, Nirmal (2011). History of Indian Football: Upto 2009–10. Readers Service. ISBN 9788187891963. Archived from the original on 22 July 2022.
- Dineo, Paul; Mills, James (2001). Soccer in South Asia: Empire, Nation, Diaspora. London, United Kingdom: Frank Cass Publishers. ISBN 978-0-7146-8170-2. Archived from the original on 25 July 2022.
- Majumdar, Boria; Bandyopadhyay, Kausik (2006). A Social History Of Indian Football: Striving To Score. Routledge. ISBN 9780415348355. Archived from the original on 29 June 2021.
- Basu, Jaydeep (2003). Stories from Indian Football. UBS Publishers' Distributors. ISBN 9788174764546. Archived from the original on 11 October 2022.
- "Triumphs and Disasters: The Story of Indian Football, 1889—2000" (PDF). Archived from the original (PDF) on 13 August 2012.
- Mukhopadhay, Subir (2018). সোনায় লেখা ইতিহাসে মোহনবাগান (transl. Mohun Bagan in the history written in gold). ISBN 978-93-850172-0-9.
- Majumdar, Boria, Bandyopadhyay, Kausik (2006). Goalless: The Story of a Unique Footballing Nation. Penguin India. ISBN 9780670058747.
- Banerjee, Argha; Basu, Rupak (2022). মোহনবাগান: সবুজ ঘাসের মেরুন গল্প (transl. Mohun Bagan: Green fields' Maroon stories). Shalidhan. ISBN 978-81-954667-0-2.
