= Bootland =

Bootland is a surname. Notable people with the surname include:

- Bob Bootland (died 2007), English football manager
- Charles Bootland (1916–1981), Scottish footballer
- Darryl Bootland (born 1981), Canadian ice hockey player
- Nick Bootland (born 1978), Canadian ice hockey player and coach
