= Felipe Gomes =

Felipe Gomes may refer to:

- Felipe Gomes (sprinter) (born 1986), Brazilian Paralympic sprinter
- Felipe Gomes (footballer) (born 1988), Brazilian football goalkeeper

== See also ==
- Filipe Gomes (disambiguation)
- Felip Gomes (born 1978), Indian football defender
