= Syed Abdul Rahim =

Indian footballer, coach, and manager (1909–1963)

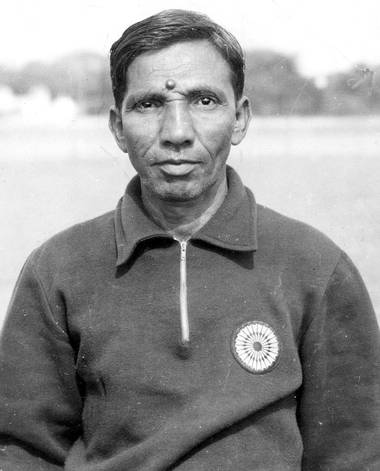
- Rahim Saab as manager of India during their golden era

Personal information
- Full name: Syed Abdul Rahim
- Date of birth: 17 August 1909
- Place of birth: Hyderabad, Hyderabad State, British India
- Date of death: 11 June 1963 (aged 53)
- Place of death: Hyderabad, Andhra Pradesh, India

Youth career
- 1927–1931: Osmania University

Senior career*
Years	Team	Apps	(Gls)
1943	Qamar Club		
1950	HSV Hoek		

Managerial career
- 1950–1963: Hyderabad City Police (head coach & secretary)
- 1950–1963: India
- 1958–1959: Hyderabad
- * Club domestic league appearances and goals

Syed Abdul Rahim (Telugu: [sɐjːɐd̪ ɐbd̪ul ɾɐhiːm], 17 August 1909 – 11 June 1963), popularly known as Rahim Saab, was an Indian football coach and manager of the India national team from 1950 until his death in 1963, and a former player. He is regarded as the architect of modern Indian football. A teacher by profession, he was a strong motivator and his tenure as a coach is regarded as the "golden age" of football in India.

Under his stewardship, the India national team earned superiority in both technical qualities and tactical innovations, and got the nickname "Brazil of Asia". They went on to win gold medals in Asian Games of—(1951-Delhi and 1962-Jakarta), played semi-finals of the Summer Olympics—(1956-Melbourne) making India the first ever Asian country to achieve this place, win the titles of Asian Quadrangular Football Tournament for the years of—(1952-Colombo and 1954-Calcutta and came runners-up in Pestabola Merdeka—(1959 Kuala Lumpur).

== Playing career ==
Rahim was born on 17 August 1909 in Hyderabad, Hyderabad State, British India. In his early years, he worked as a school teacher. After taking football seriously, Rahim represented the football team of Osmania University, from where he graduated. He also played for a team named "Eleven Hunters", consisting of then enrolled and former students of the college.

After his journey as a teacher, Rahim returned to his college to complete his arts degree. Thereafter, he worked as the teacher successively in Kachiguda Middle School, Urdu Sharif School, Darul-ul-Uloom High School and Chaderghat High School. He then got a diploma in physical education and took charge of sports in the last two schools he served as teacher.

Rahim was a professional footballer for a while, representing Qamar Club, which was then considered to be one of the best teams in the local league. Rahim also played for the Dutch Amateur League club HSV Hoek in the Netherlands, before going on to become a manager.

== Football administration ==
When playing domestic football, Rahim along with Indian sports pioneer Syed Mohammad Hadi, became associated with activities related to football organization in Hyderabad State. He was one of the founding members of Hyderabad Football Association (HFA), incorporated in 1939. In 1943, Rahim was elected secretary of HFA, while Ghulam Muhammad was elected as the first President in 1942. During the tenure of then AIFF vice-president Shiv Kumar Lal, both Andhra (incepted later) and Hyderabad Football Associations were merged to form Andhra Pradesh Football Association (APFA). Soon after the merger, Rahim was elected secretary of APFA, and became involved in developing infrastructure of the game in both Hyderabad and Secunderabad. Rahim played an influential role behind a compact development of football in Hyderabad in the 1950s, when five organized clubs were competing, fifteen thousand footballers were registered, and nearly forty qualified referees came up in the state. A lover of Hyderabadi one-touch football, he later scouted young players such as Tulsidas Balaram, from Secundrabad League while visiting local matches as chief guest.

== Managerial career ==
=== Hyderabad City Police ===
In 1950, Rahim joined Hyderabad City Police Club as coach. He succeeded Norbert Andrew Fruvall for the post. He managed the team from 1950 until his death in 1963. The Hyderabadi club won five consecutive Rovers Cups during his tenure from 1950 to 1955. He also took his team to five Durand Cup finals, winning three of them. One of the finest players of that team, Muhammad Noor, recalled the training session years under Rahim as: "Often at practice we had just one football and for refreshments afterwards just a cup of tea but our hard practice, a will to succeed and excellent coaching from the late Rahim Saheb enabled us to become a successful team".

=== Hyderabad ===
Rahim managed Hyderabad football team in Santosh Trophy, known as the senior national championships. He guided the team clinching two consecutive titles in 1956–57 and 1957–58, defeating the same team, Bombay, in finals. At the 1958–59 edition, Hyderabad were on the verge of a hat-trick of Santosh Trophy titles in Madras, but went down 5–2 to Services in semi-finals. Most of the members of his Hyderabad City Police team, represented Hyderabad in the tournament.

=== India ===
He became manager of the India national football team in 1950, the same year, India had not gone to the 1950 FIFA World Cup in Brazil. Rahim's first assignment as the coach of India was to train the team that toured Ceylon in 1949. Rahim made the Indian team prominent during the "golden era" of Indian football, became one of the best teams in Asia. In March 1951, at the inaugural 1951 Asian Games in New Delhi, Rahim helped India in winning the gold medal. They defeated Iran 1–0 in the gold medal match to gain their first trophy, as Sheoo Mewalal finished the tournament as top scorer. In 1954, noted British manager Bert Flatley became Rahim's assistant at the 1954 Asian Quadrangular Football Tournament.

During Rahim's tenure, the Indian football team enjoyed a great deal of success. Apart from winning the Asian games in 1951 and 1962, India also reached the semi-finals of the 1956 Melbourne Olympics which is still considered India's greatest ever achievement in football. Under his coaching at that tournament, players like Neville D'Souza, Samar Banerjee, P. K. Banerjee, J. Krishnaswamy achieved fame worldwide. At the 1960 Summer Olympics in Rome, India lost to Hungary 2–1 in their first game, with Balaram scoring the consolation goal in the 79th minute. India almost upset 1958 FIFA World Cup semi-finalists France few days later, in which Balaram's goal gave the lead to India but a mistake from Ram Bahadur Thapa denied India a famous victory.

Rahim's last success was at the 1962 Asian games in Jakarta, where India won gold, beating South Korea in the finals in front of a crowd of 100,000. He is also credited for bringing up and nurturing Indian talents during his tenure, including Peter Thangaraj, Nikhil Nandy, Kesto Pal, Chuni Goswami, Jarnail Singh, Tulsidas Balaram, Sheikh Abdul Latif, Mariappa Kempaiah, Dharmalingam Kannan, Hussain Ahmed, Mohammed Rahmatullah, Yousuf Khan, Arun Ghosh, Nikhil Nandy, and Amal Dutta. Rahim was succeeded by English coach Harry Wright in 1964, who led the side to the runners-up spot in the 1964 Asian Cup.

== Tactics and style ==
Rahim is considered to be the greatest football coach India has ever produced. His tenure is considered as a "Golden age" of Indian football. Rahim was a teacher in his early career and coached Hyderabad City Police FC, which made him a strict disciplinarian and a good tactician. Utilizing the available resources, he made the best out of them by conducting non-dribbling and weaker leg (the players supposedly play with their weaker foot) tournaments to improve one-touch play.

Rahim introduced the classic 4–2–4 formation in Indian football team much before Brazil popularised it in the 1958 World Cup.

The 1962 Asian Games was Rahim's final major tournament, winning a 2–1 victory over South Korea. Before that final, he famously said to his players, "Kal aap logon se mujhe ek tohfa chahiye...kal aap sona jitlo" (lit. 'I want a gift from you tomorrow...the gold medal').

When Indian national coach Alberto Fernando had gone to a workshop in Brazil in 1964, he said:

What I learnt from Rahim in 1956 is being taught now in Brazil. Verily, he was a football prophet.

Former Indian international Mohammed Zulfiqaruddin said about Rahim, as:

He was a master at work. He made the Indian football team a formidable unit. He had the uncanny ability of spotting talent and turning them into solid players. But he was a strict disciplinarian.

== Personal life ==
Rahim was popularly known as 'Maulvi Sahib' due to his gentleman gesture and tireless works and dedications in developing football at that time. He went to the Nizam College, and later, was part of its football section.

Rahim was married to Saira Rahim. Their son Syed Shahid Hakim was a former professional football player, who represented India at the 1960 Summer Olympics. Hakim also worked as a FIFA official, a squadron leader in the Indian Air Force, and a referee. He later managed the national team like his father, and was a recipient of the Dhyan Chand Award.

== Death ==
Rahim died of lung cancer on 12 June 1963 after being bed-ridden for six months.

== Legacy ==
A former Indian football player Fortunato Franco said about "Rahim Saab";

With him he took Indian Football to the grave.

In memory of Rahim, the I-League "Best Coach Award" is renamed as "Syed Abdul Rahim Award", given to the best coach in each season by the All India Football Federation (AIFF).

== In popular culture ==
A biopic on Rahim named Maidaan, directed by Amit Sharma, with Ajay Devgn as Rahim in lead role, was released theatrically on Eid al-Fitr 2024.

== Honours ==
=== Managerial ===
Hyderabad City Police

- Durand Cup: 1950–51, 1954, 1957–58, 1961; runner-up: 1952, 1956–57
- Rovers Cup: 1950, 1951, 1952, 1953, 1954, 1957, 1960, 1962
- DCM Trophy: 1959

India

- Asian Games Gold Medal: 1951, 1962
- Asian Quadrangular Football Tournament: 1952, 1954
- Merdeka Cup runners-up: 1959

Hyderabad State

- Santosh Trophy: 1956–57, 1957–58

== See also ==
- List of Indian football players in foreign leagues
- List of India national football team managers
- History of the India national football team
- History of Indian football
