= J. Krishnaswamy =

Indian footballer

Kittu
Personal information
- Date of birth: 1932
- Place of birth: Thanjavur, British India
- Date of death: 6 November 1981 (aged 48–49)
- Place of death: Bangalore, Karnataka, India
- Height: 5 ft 5 in (1.65 m)
- Position: Forward

Senior career*
Years	Team	Apps	(Gls)
1956–57	East Bengal		

International career
	India	3	(1)

Managerial career
- 1974: India
- 1979–1980: India Women
- * Club domestic league appearances and goals

Jagannath Krishnaswamy (1932 – 6 November 1981), better known as "Kittu", was a former footballer who represented India as a forward at the 1956 Summer Olympics, where he scored once. He was vice-captain of the national team.

== Playing career ==
Krishnaswamy represented India at the 1956 Melbourne Olympics and reached the semi-finals, before going down 1–4 to Yugoslavia. Reaching that semi-final is still considered India's greatest ever achievement in football. Under the coaching of Syed Abdul Rahim, he played alongside Neville D'Souza, Samar Banerjee, P. K. Banerjee, and achieved fame worldwide.

== Managerial career ==
After retirement, Krishnaswamy became the head coach of the Indian national team that participated in 1974 Merdeka Tournament. He was also appointed head coach of the Indian women's national team and managed the team at the 1980 AFC Women's Championship, in which they finished as runners-up.

== Personal life ==
His daughter Uma Kittu played for India women's football team and was part of the squad that finished runners-up at the 1980 AFC Women's Championship.

== Honours ==
India

- Asian Quadrangular Football Tournament: 1955

=== Bengal ===
- Santosh Trophy: 1955–56

== See also ==
- History of Indian football
- History of the India national football team
- India national football team at the Olympics
- List of India national football team captains
- List of India national football team managers
