= Football at the Asian Games =

- Organiser(s): OCA
- Founded: Men: 1951; Women: 1990
- Region: Asia
- Current champions: M: South Korea (2026); W: Japan (2026)
- Most championships: M:South Korea (7 titles); W:Japan (4 titles)
- 2026 (M), 2026 (W)

The men's football tournament has been a regular Asian Games sporting event since the 1951 edition, while the women's tournament began in 1990.

== History ==
The first Asian Games had football tournament.

Since the 2002 Asian Games, age limit for men teams is under-23 plus up to three overage players for each squad, same as the age limit in football competitions at the Summer Olympics.

Japan is the only nation to have won both Gold medals of Men's and Women's tournament in an Asian Games in the same year (2010).

== Men's tournament ==
=== Results ===
- 1951–1998: Senior tournament
- 2002–present: Under-23 tournament

#	Year	Host	Final			Bronze medal match			Teams
#	Year	Host	Gold medalists	Score	Silver medalists	Bronze medalists	Score	Fourth place	Teams
1	1951 details	(India) New Delhi	India	1–0	Iran	Japan	2–0	Afghanistan	6
2	1954 details	(Philippines) Manila	Republic of China	5–2	South Korea	Burma	5–4	Indonesia	12
3	1958 details	(Japan) Tokyo	Republic of China	3–2	South Korea	Indonesia	4–1	India	14
4	1962 details	(Indonesia) Jakarta	India	2–1	South Korea	Malaya	4–1	South Vietnam	8
5	1966 details	(Thailand) Bangkok	Burma	1–0	Iran	Japan	2–0	Singapore	11
6	1970 details	(Thailand) Bangkok	Burma South Korea	0–0 (a.e.t.)^{1}		India	1–0	Japan	10
7	1974 details	(Iran) Tehran	Iran	1–0	Israel	Malaysia	2–1	North Korea	15
8	1978 details	(Thailand) Bangkok	North Korea South Korea	0–0 (a.e.t.)^{1}		China	1–0	Iraq	14
9	1982 details	(India) New Delhi	Iraq	1–0	Kuwait	Saudi Arabia	2–0^{2}	North Korea	16
10	1986 details	(South Korea) Seoul	South Korea	2–0	Saudi Arabia	Kuwait	5–0	Indonesia	18
11	1990 details	(China) Beijing	Iran	0–0 (a.e.t.) (4–1 p)	North Korea	South Korea	1–0	Thailand	14
12	1994 details	(Japan) Hiroshima	Uzbekistan	4–2	China	Kuwait	2–1	South Korea	18
13	1998 details	(Thailand) Bangkok	Iran	2–0	Kuwait	China	3–0	Thailand	23
14	2002 details	(South Korea) Busan	Iran	2–1	Japan	South Korea	3–0	Thailand	24
15	2006 details	(Qatar) Doha	Qatar	1–0	Iraq	Iran	1–0 (a.e.t.)	South Korea	28
16	2010 details	(China) Guangzhou	Japan	1–0	United Arab Emirates	South Korea	4–3	Iran	24
17	2014 details	(South Korea) Incheon	South Korea	1–0 (a.e.t.)	North Korea	Iraq	1–0	Thailand	29
18	2018 details	(Indonesia) Jakarta–Palembang	South Korea	2–1 (a.e.t.)	Japan	United Arab Emirates	1–1 (4–3 p)	Vietnam	25
19	2022 details	(China) Hangzhou	South Korea	2–1	Japan	Uzbekistan	4–0	Hong Kong	21
20	2026 details	(Japan) Aichi–Nagoya	South Korea	1–0	Japan	China	2–2 (4–3 p)	Uzbekistan	15

^{1} The title was shared.
^{2} Saudi Arabia were awarded the third-place playoff by default after the Korea DPR team were handed a two-year suspension for assaulting officials at the end of their semi-final.

=== Medal table ===
Team	Gold	Silver	Bronze
South Korea	7 (1970, 1978, 1986*, 2014*, 2018, 2022, 2026)	3 (1954, 1958, 1962)	3 (1990, 2002*, 2010)
Iran	4 (1974*, 1990, 1998, 2002)	2 (1951, 1966)	1 (2006)
India	2 (1951*, 1962)		1 (1970)
Myanmar	2 (1966, 1970)		1 (1954)
Chinese Taipei	2 (1954, 1958)		
Japan	1 (2010)	4 (2002, 2018, 2022, 2026*)	2 (1951, 1966)
North Korea	1 (1978)	2 (1990, 2014)	
Iraq	1 (1982)	1 (2006)	1 (2014)
Uzbekistan	1 (1994)		1 (2022)
Qatar	1 (2006*)		
Kuwait		2 (1982, 1998)	2 (1986, 1994)
China		1 (1994)	3 (1978, 1998, 2026)
Saudi Arabia		1 (1986)	1 (1982)
United Arab Emirates		1 (2010)	1 (2018)
Israel		1 (1974*)	
Malaysia			2 (1962, 1974)
Indonesia			1 (1958)

* = host

=== Individual records ===
Year	Top scorer(s)	Goals	Winning manager(s)
1951	(India) Sheoo Mewalal	3	(India) Syed Abdul Rahim
1954			(Taiwan) Lee Wai Tong
1958			(Taiwan) Lee Wai Tong
1962			(India) Syed Abdul Rahim
1966			(Soviet Union) German Zonin
1970	(Myanmar) Win Maung	5	(South Korea) Han Hong-ki (Myanmar) U Pe Tin
1974	(Israel) Gidi Damti	6	(Republic of Ireland) Frank O'Farrell
1978			(South Korea) Ham Heung-chul (North Korea) Pak Du-sok
1982	(Iraq) Hussein Saeed	4	(Iraq) Ammo Baba
1986	(Kuwait) Salah Al-Hasawi	6	(South Korea) Kim Jung-nam
1990	(Iran) Farshad Pious (South Korea) Seo Jung-won	4	(Iran) Ali Parvin
1994	(South Korea) Hwang Sun-hong	11	(Uzbekistan) Rustam Akramov
1998	(Kuwait) Faraj Laheeb	9	(Iran) Mansour Pourheidari
2002	(Iran) Alireza Vahedi Nikbakht (Japan) Satoshi Nakayama	5	(Croatia) Branko Ivanković
2006	(Jordan) Odai Al-Saify	7	(Bosnia and Herzegovina) Džemaludin Mušović
2010	(Japan) Kensuke Nagai	5	(Japan) Takashi Sekizuka
2014	(Indonesia) Ferdinand Sinaga	6	(South Korea) Lee Kwang-jong
2018	(South Korea) Hwang Ui-jo	9	(South Korea) Kim Hak-bum
2022	(South Korea) Jeong Woo-yeong	8	(South Korea) Hwang Sun-hong
2026	(South Korea) Eom Ji-sung (Uzbekistan) Sardorbek Bakhromov	4	(South Korea) Lee Min-sung

=== Participating nations ===
Football at the Asian Games was a senior tournament until 1998.
Football at the Asian Games has been an under-23 tournament since 2002.

Nation (45)	(India) 1951 (6)	(Philippines) 1954 (12)	(Japan) 1958 (14)	(Indonesia) 1962 (8)	(Thailand) 1966 (11)	(Thailand) 1970 (10)	(Iran) 1974 (15)	(Thailand) 1978 (14)	(India) 1982 (16)	(South Korea) 1986 (18)	(China) 1990 (14)	(Japan) 1994 (18)	(Thailand) 1998 (23)	(South Korea) 2002 (24)	(Qatar) 2006 (28)	(China) 2010 (24)	(South Korea) 2014 (29)	(Indonesia) 2018 (25)	(China) 2022 (21)	Years
Afghanistan	4th	12th												24th			25th		WD	4
Bahrain							14th	14th		12th		10th		7th	9th	18th		16th	13th	9
Bangladesh								13th	12th	14th	13th		DQ	20th	24th	24th	20th	15th	20th	10
Brunei												DQ	DQ							0
Cambodia						7th							19th							2
China							10th	3rd	7th	8th	6th	2nd	3rd	5th	5th	12th	15th	9th	7th	13
Chinese Taipei		1st	1st	DQ	9th													25th	18th	5
Hong Kong		5th	6th								9th	14th	22nd	14th	13th	10th	10th	14th	4th	11
India	1st	8th	4th	1st	8th	3rd	13th	8th	6th	16th	DQ	DQ	16th	10th	14th	14th	26th		9th	16
Indonesia	6th	4th	3rd	5th	5th	5th				4th	DQ	DQ			27th		11th	10th	11th	11
Iran	2nd		14th		2nd	8th	1st		8th	6th	1st	9th	1st	1st	3rd	4th	23rd	13th	6th	16
Iraq							5th	4th	1st	7th	DQ				2nd	DQ	3rd	DQ		6
Israel			5th	DQ			2nd													2
Japan	3rd	10th	12th	6th	3rd	4th	9th	9th	5th	9th	8th	7th	9th	2nd	11th	1st	5th	2nd	2nd	19
Jordan														DQ	19th	21st	7th			3
Kazakhstan												DQ	10th							1
Kuwait							6th	5th	2nd	3rd	7th	3rd	2nd	5th	10th	11th	18th		19th	12
Kyrgyzstan															17th	23rd	16th	20th	12th	5
Laos													21st				27th	23rd		3
Lebanon													12th	12th						2
Macau															28th					1
Malaysia			13th	3rd	10th	10th	3rd	7th	14th	15th	12th	12th		17th	23rd	16th	19th	12th		15
Maldives													20th	22nd	20th	17th	21st			5
Mongolia												DQ	23rd	DQ					21st	2
Myanmar (Burma)	5th	3rd	11th	DQ	1st	1st	7th	12th	13th			16th	DQ					19th	10th	11
Nepal									16th	18th		18th	17th				29th	22nd		6
North Korea							4th	1st	4th		2nd		13th	8th	8th	5th	2nd	7th	5th	11
Oman									DQ	10th		10th	11th	9th	16th	6th	22nd			7
Pakistan		6th	9th				11th			17th	14th			23rd	21st	22nd	24th	17th		10
Palestine												DQ		21st	22nd	20th	14th	11th	15th	6
Philippines		11th	8th	8th			15th													4
Qatar								11th		13th	DQ	13th	5th	11th	1st	9th		21st	16th	9
Saudi Arabia								10th	3rd	2nd	5th	5th					6th	8th	8th	8
Singapore		9th	10th		4th						11th				26th	19th	17th			7
South Korea		2nd	2nd	2nd	11th	1st	8th	1st	9th	1st	3rd	4th	6th	3rd	4th	3rd	1st	1st	1st	18
South Yemen									15th											1
Syria									10th						12th			6th	WD	3
Tajikistan													14th	DQ	25th		13th			3
Thailand				7th	6th	6th	12th	6th	10th	11th	4th	15th	4th	4th	7th	7th	4th	18th	14th	16
Timor-Leste																	28th	24th		2
Turkmenistan												7th	8th	18th	DQ	13th				4
United Arab Emirates										5th		8th	15th	13th	18th	2nd	8th	3rd		8
Uzbekistan												1st	7th	16th	6th	8th	9th	5th	3rd	8
Vietnam (South Vietnam)		7th	7th	4th	7th	9th							17th	19th	15th	14th	12th	4th	17th	12
Yemen (North Yemen)									DQ		10th	17th		15th	DQ					3

== Women's tournament ==
=== Results ===
The first women's tournament was held in the 1990 Asian Games.

#	Year	Host	Final			Bronze medal match			Teams
#	Year	Host	Gold medalists	Score	Silver medalists	Bronze medalists	Score	Fourth place	Teams
1	1990	(China) Beijing	China	No playoffs	Japan	North Korea	No playoffs	Chinese Taipei	6
2	1994	(Japan) Hiroshima	China	2–0	Japan	Chinese Taipei	No playoffs	South Korea	4
3	1998	(Thailand) Bangkok	China	1–0 (g.g.)	North Korea	Japan	2–1	Chinese Taipei	8
4	2002	(South Korea) Busan	North Korea	No playoffs	China	Japan	No playoffs	South Korea	6
5	2006	(Qatar) Doha	North Korea	0–0 (a.e.t.) (4–2 p)	Japan	China	2–0	South Korea	8
6	2010	(China) Guangzhou	Japan	1–0	North Korea	South Korea	2–0	China	7
7	2014	(South Korea) Incheon	North Korea	3–1	Japan	South Korea	3–0	Vietnam	11
8	2018	(Indonesia) Jakarta–Palembang	Japan	1–0	China	South Korea	4–0	Chinese Taipei	11
9	2022	(China) Hangzhou	Japan	4–1	North Korea	China	7–0	Uzbekistan	16
10	2026	(Japan) Aichi–Nagoya	Japan	2–2 (a.e.t.) (5–3 p)	North Korea	South Korea	1–0	China	12

=== Medal table ===
Team	Gold	Silver	Bronze
Japan	4 (2010, 2018, 2022, 2026*)	4 (1990, 1994*, 2006, 2014)	2 (1998, 2002)
North Korea	3 (2002, 2006, 2014)	4 (1998, 2010, 2022, 2026)	1 (1990)
China	3 (1990*, 1994, 1998)	2 (2002, 2018)	2 (2006, 2022*)
South Korea			4 (2010, 2014*, 2018, 2026)
Chinese Taipei			1 (1994)

* = host

=== Individual records ===
Year	Top scorer	Goals	Winning manager
1990			(China) Shang Ruihua
1994			(China) Ma Yuanan
1998			(China) Ma Yuanan
2002	(North Korea) Jin Pyol-hui	4	(North Korea) Ri Song-gun
2006	(China) Han Duan	7	(North Korea) Kim Kwang-min
2010	(South Korea) Ji So-yun	5	(Japan) Norio Sasaki
2014	(Thailand) Nisa Romyen	8	(North Korea) Kim Kwang-min
2018	(China) Wang Shanshan	12	(Japan) Asako Takakura
2022	(North Korea) Kim Kyong-yong	12	(Japan) Michihisa Kano
2026	(Japan) Chiina Kamiya	7	(Japan) Michihisa Kano

=== Participating nations ===
Nation (22)	(China) 1990 (6)	(Japan) 1994 (4)	(Thailand) 1998 (8)	(South Korea) 2002 (6)	(Qatar) 2006 (8)	(China) 2010 (7)	(South Korea) 2014 (11)	(Indonesia) 2018 (11)	(China) 2022 (16)	Years
Bangladesh									12th	1
Cambodia									WD	0
China	1st	1st	1st	2nd	3rd	4th	5th	2nd	3rd	9
Chinese Taipei	4th	3rd	4th	5th	5th		7th	4th	6th	8
Hong Kong	6th						8th	8th	14th	4
India			8th				9th		13th	3
Indonesia								9th		1
Iran									WD	0
Japan	2nd	2nd	3rd	3rd	2nd	1st	2nd	1st	1st	9
Jordan					8th	7th	10th			3
Maldives					DQ		11th	10th		2
Mongolia									16th	1
Myanmar									10th	1
Nepal									11th	1
North Korea	3rd		2nd	1st	1st	2nd	1st	6th	2nd	8
Philippines	DQ								7th	1
Singapore									15th	1
South Korea	5th	4th	5th	4th	4th	3rd	3rd	3rd	5th	9
Tajikistan								11th		1
Thailand	DQ		7th		6th	6th	6th	7th	8th	6
Uzbekistan									4th	1
Vietnam			6th	6th	7th	5th	4th	5th	9th	7

== Medal tables ==
=== Total ===
Rank	Nation	Gold	Silver	Bronze	Total
1	South Korea (KOR)	7	3	7	17
2	Japan (JPN)	5	8	4	17
3	North Korea (PRK)	4	6	1	11
4	Iran (IRI)	4	2	1	7
5	China (CHN)	3	3	5	11
6	Chinese Taipei (TPE)	2	0	1	3
6	India (IND)	2	0	1	3
6	Myanmar (MYA)	2	0	1	3
9	Iraq (IRQ)	1	1	1	3
10	Uzbekistan (UZB)	1	0	1	2
11	Qatar (QAT)	1	0	0	1
12	Kuwait (KUW)	0	2	2	4
13	Saudi Arabia (KSA)	0	1	1	2
13	United Arab Emirates (UAE)	0	1	1	2
15	Israel (ISR)	0	1	0	1
16	Malaysia (MAS)	0	0	2	2
17	Indonesia (INA)	0	0	1	1
Totals (17 entries)		32	28	30	90

=== Men ===
Rank	Nation	Gold	Silver	Bronze	Total
1	South Korea (KOR)	7	3	3	13
2	Iran (IRI)	4	2	1	7
3	India (IND)	2	0	1	3
3	Myanmar (MYA)	2	0	1	3
5	Chinese Taipei (TPE)	2	0	0	2
6	Japan (JPN)	1	4	2	7
7	North Korea (PRK)	1	2	0	3
8	Iraq (IRQ)	1	1	1	3
9	Uzbekistan (UZB)	1	0	1	2
10	Qatar (QAT)	1	0	0	1
11	Kuwait (KUW)	0	2	2	4
12	China (CHN)	0	1	3	4
13	Saudi Arabia (KSA)	0	1	1	2
13	United Arab Emirates (UAE)	0	1	1	2
15	Israel (ISR)	0	1	0	1
16	Malaysia (MAS)	0	0	2	2
17	Indonesia (INA)	0	0	1	1
Totals (17 entries)		22	18	20	60

=== Women ===
Rank	Nation	Gold	Silver	Bronze	Total
1	Japan (JPN)	4	4	2	10
2	North Korea (PRK)	3	4	1	8
3	China (CHN)	3	2	2	7
4	South Korea (KOR)	0	0	4	4
5	Chinese Taipei (TPE)	0	0	1	1
Totals (5 entries)		10	10	10	30

== See also ==
- Football at the Summer Olympics
- Beach soccer at the Asian Beach Games
- FIFA
