= Armando Colaco =

Indian footballer and manager (born 1953)

Armando Colaço
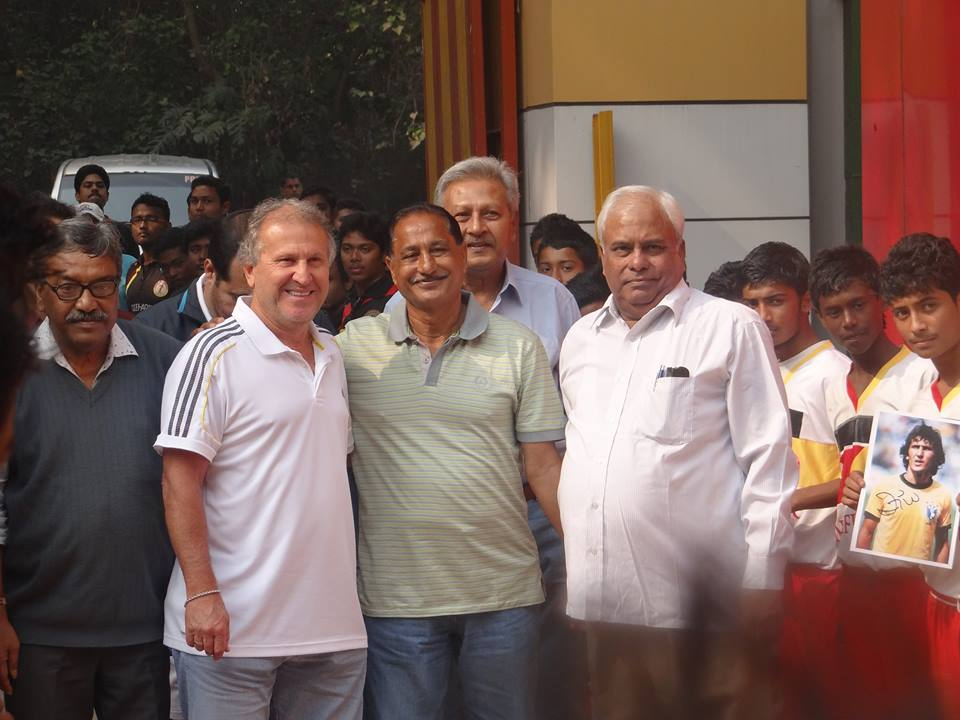
- Colaco (center) with Zico (left) in East Bengal club tent

Personal information
- Date of birth: 22 June 1953 (age 73)
- Place of birth: Panjim, Portuguese India
- Height: 5 ft 9 in (1.75 m)
- Position: Defender

Team information
- Current team: Sporting Goa

Senior career*
Years	Team	Apps	(Gls)
1971–1986	Dempo	475	(45)

Managerial career
- 1988–1989: Sesa Goa
- 1994–2000: Churchill Brothers
- 2000–2013: Dempo
- 2011-2012: India
- 2013–2015: East Bengal
- 2016–2018: Bardez
- 2022–: Sporting Goa
- * Club domestic league appearances and goals

Armando Colaço (born 22 June 1953) is an Indian football coach who is currently the head coach of Sporting Goa in the I-League 2. He is the most successful and longest serving coach in the history of the I-League club Dempo.

Heavily influenced by Ukrainian Valeriy Lobanovskyi, Colaco is the first I-League coach to guide an Indian team into the semi-finals of the AFC Cup, which he did in 2008. Colaco is widely regarded as one of India's best managers after the success he has enjoyed at Churchill Brothers and Dempo. He also managed football team of Goa in Santosh Trophy.

== Early life ==
Colaco was born on 22 June 1953 in Panjim to parents – Vincent Salvador Colaço and Clarina Dias Colaço. Having lost his father at a very young age, but never gave up on his ambitions of playing football, which he did right from a young age during his schooling at Don Boscos where Fr Joseph Casti and Fr Thomas, in particular, encouraged the footballer in the youthful Armando. According to Armando, it was Sir Edwin, Domnic, Wilson Paes, along with Fr Simon, Fr Edward and Fr Benedict who played an important role in his life as far as his early upbringing was concerned. Later in his life, his wife Juliana and daughter Genevieve have been his motivation and support.

== Playing career ==
=== First-team career ===
After gaining the necessary exposure with Don Bosco and Panjim Gymkhana, Armando, who was at the end of his teens, took a career-shaping step in the 1970–71 season when he was chosen to play for Dempo for the first time, under coach Joseph Ratnam, who taught his wards how to play football with discipline. "That was a very important phase of my career as far as shaping the destiny of my football talent was concerned as I got picked for a big club – Dempo," Armando reminisced. Though he made Dempo his abode for the next 14 years to come, as a player, the hardworking Armando plied his trade with dedication and commitment before he hung his boots in 1985.

== Managerial career ==
=== Early coaching ===
A recipient of the State Kerkar award, Armando, had to look beyond his retirement as a player and it were two men – Alberto Colaço, the present AIFF secretary, and Agnelo Mascarenhas, who encouraged the just-retired Dempo player to move into football coaching. And thus began a new journey for Armando the coach. From 1985-88, the Curtorim-based trainer, essayed himself into coaching Salcete Football Club and soon guided the club to a win in Stafford Cup. Soon, Armando had a one-year offer from Sesa Goa, which he accepted with delight and during the 1988–89 season, the team won the Vitthal Trophy under his guidance. That actually set the tone for his coaching stints elsewhere as Armando, who was fast gathering moss, rolled on like a stone, and successfully coached the state U-21 Santosh team partnering Peter Vales and also Goa U-23 team at the BC Roy Trophy in the early 90s. That was after a year-long stint with Dempo S.C. (1989–90) where he won the Pomes Cup and Scissors Cup.

=== Churchill Brothers ===
His success was noted as Churchill Brothers S.C. offered him the role of a coach first and then the Technical Director when Danny Maclaren was roped in as a coach during the 1994–2000 period. Switching his base from Dempo to Churchill in the 90s, Armando had announced his arrival as a seasoned coach with three Goa Football League titles and an NFL runner-up trophy with Churchill Brothers and also a foray into the AFC Cup.

=== Dempo ===
In 2000, came a Clarion call from Mr Shrinivas V Dempo, offering Armando to coach his team, which had hit a trough in the National Football League following a demotion. Having agreed to accept the challenge, Armando greeted the opportunity to redefine the destiny of a football club, which under his patronage has risen from the dust to virtually touch the skies.

Under Colaço, Dempos have managed to inscribe their name on four national league titles, Durand Cup, Federation Cup and he also managed Dempo to have been the first Indian club to reach the semi-finals of the AFC Cup, in 2008. Also he won Dempo three I-League titles in 2007–08 and 2009–10 and 2011–12. After the 2012–13 season where Dempo finished in 5th place, they parted ways with Armando Colaco with whom they had won 5 League titles.

=== India ===
I have had nothing against Štimac, but I have often wondered whether Indian coaches would get a similar long run. Results cannot come overnight, particularly when a coach has a new philosophy and new ideas. You need to give him time. You need to be patient. I could have achieved results with the national team but didn't get time. They gave me three months for a start and then handed me a one-year contract, which I refused. I needed at least three years to implement my ideas and change the way the national team played. The AIFF were not willing.

— Armando Colaco, on his managerial career as head coach of India.

On 17 May 2011, Colaço in an interview said that he had accepted the job to coach the Indian football team. The All India Football Federation confirmed the appointment after an Executive Committee meeting on 20 May. On 10 July 2011, Colaço managed his first India match against Maldives, the match ended 1–1. On 17 July 2011, Colaco won his first game as manager of India against Qatar 2–1 in a friendly. On 23 July 2011, Colaço suffered his first defeat, 0–3, at the hands of the UAE during a 2014 FIFA World Cup qualification match at Sheikh Khalifa International stadium, Al Ain City. In the return leg on 28 July 2011 in Ambedkar Stadium, Delhi Colaço managed to get India a 2–2 draw but could not stop India from falling 5–2 on aggregate. He was removed from his post shortly, and replaced by Savio Medeira in October 2011.

=== East Bengal ===
On 14 November 2013, East Bengal appointed Armando Colaco as their new head coach. On 15 May 2014, it was confirmed that Colaco would continue coaching the club for another year.

Despite being given the chance to coach the team for the entire 2014–15 campaign, it was announced that Colaco had been sacked by East Bengal on 18 February 2015.

=== Later years ===
Since parting ways with East Bengal in 2015, Colaco had spells at Bardez FC, Sesa FA and more-recently with Churchill Brothers in the Goa Professional League. In August 2022, Colaco was appointed as new head coach of another Goa-based side Sporting Clube de Goa on a three-year deal. At the inaugural edition of I-League 3 in 2023, his club Sporting Goa crowned champions with a superior head-to-head record against fellow Goan side Dempo and Sporting Club Bengaluru in play-offs, secured promotion to the I-League 2.

== Tactics ==
Colaco has been widely praised for his tactical prowess and match reading abilities. He is regarded as one of the first coaches in India to have brought the possession style football in the country. In his time at dempo, he employed a 4-4-2 formation, having Climax Lawrence as a defensive midfield; Clifford Miranda, Joaquim Abranches, Anthony Pereira or Nicolau Borges as wide midfielders with Brazilian Beto as supporting striker behind Ranti Martins, the main striker. Characteristics of that team was that they played with short passes along with sudden burst of wing play. This strategy helped Dempo to reach the semi-finals of the 2008 AFC Cup, although losing to Al-Safa' SC of Lebanon in the semi-finals.

== Statistics ==
Team	Nat	From	To	Record				
Team	Nat	From	To	G	W	D	L	Win %
Dempo	(India)	June 2000	2013	217	119	55	43	54.84
India	(India)	2011	2011	6	1	2	3	16.67
East Bengal	(India)	20 November 2013	18 February 2015	31	13	11	7	41.94
Total				254	133	68	53	52.36

== Honours ==
=== Managerial ===
Salcete

- Stafford Cup: 1987

SESA Goa

- Vitthal Trophy: 1988–89

Dempo

- National Football League: 2004–05, 2006–07; runners-up: 2003–04
- I-League: 2007–08, 2009–10, 2011–12; third place: 2010–11
- National Football League II: 2001–02
- I-League 2nd Division: 2015–16
- Goa Professional League: 2005, 2007, 2009, 2010, 2011; runners-up: 2006–07
- Federation Cup: 2004; runners-up: 2001, 2008, 2012
- Indian Super Cup: 2008, 2010; runners-up: 2005, 2007, 2009
- Durand Cup: 2006

East Bengal

- I-League runner-up: 2013–14

Sporting Goa

- GFA Charity Cup: 2023

Individual

- Dronacharya Award: 2025
- FPAI Syed Abdul Rahim Award: 2009–10

== See also ==
- Goans in football
- History of Indian football
- List of India national football team managers

== Bibliography ==
- Kapadia, Novy (2017). Barefoot to Boots: The Many Lives of Indian Football. Penguin Random House. ISBN 978-0-143-42641-7.
- Martinez, Dolores; Mukharjiim, Projit B (2009). Football: From England to the World: The Many Lives of Indian Football. Routledge. ISBN 978-1-138-88353-6. Archived from the original on 2 July 2022.
- Nath, Nirmal (2011). History of Indian Football: Upto 2009–10. Readers Service. ISBN 9788187891963. Archived from the original on 22 July 2022.
- Dineo, Paul; Mills, James (2001). Soccer in South Asia: Empire, Nation, Diaspora. London, United Kingdom: Frank Cass Publishers. ISBN 978-0-7146-8170-2. Archived from the original on 25 July 2022.
- "Triumphs and Disasters: The Story of Indian Football, 1889—2000" (PDF). Archived from the original (PDF) on 13 August 2012.
- Roy, Gautam (1 January 2021). East Bengal 100. Allsport Foundation. ISBN 978-8194763109.
- Chattopadhyay, Hariprasad (2017). Mohun Bagan–East Bengal (in Bengali). Kolkata: Parul Prakashan.
- Majumdar, Boria; Bandyopadhyay, Kausik (2006). A Social History Of Indian Football: Striving To Score. Routledge. ISBN 9780415348355. Archived from the original on 29 June 2021.
- Basu, Jaydeep (2003). Stories from Indian Football. UBS Publishers' Distributors. ISBN 9788174764546. Archived from the original on 11 October 2022.
- Noronha, Anselm (3 July 2011). "India: FPWA President Mehrajuddin Wadoo Holds a Football Awareness Camp in Srinagar". Goal.com. Archived from the original on 5 July 2011.
- Chaudhuri, Arunava (14 December 2012). "Indian Football: Transfer Season 2012/13 — Version 8". Sportskeeda. Archived from the original on 18 July 2020.
- Mergulhao, Marcus (29 September 2008). "The League of foreign coaches". timesofindia.indiatimes.com. Margao: The Times of India. TNN. Archived from the original on 16 June 2024.
