= Menino Figueiredo =

Goan footballer (1936–2023)

- Menino Figueiredo in 2020

Personal information
- Full name: Menino Anjos Figueiredo
- Date of birth: 2 October 1936
- Place of birth: Carmona, Goa, Portuguese Goa
- Date of death: 7 April 2023 (aged 86)
- Place of death: Carmona, Goa
- Height: 1.85 m (6 ft 1 in)
- Position: Centre-back

Youth career
- Carmona Sports Club

Senior career*
Years	Team	Apps	(Gls)
1959–1971	Salgaocar		
- * Club domestic league appearances and goals

Menino Anjos Figueiredo (2 October 1936 – 7 April 2023) was a Goan-Portuguese professional football player. Widely regarded as one of the pioneering figures in Goan football and was Goa's first international football player.

A deep-lying playmaker who operated in the classic number 5 position, Figueiredo was a towering defender nicknamed as "Khambo" (Pillar) who later moved to midfield.

== Career ==
Figueiredo began his football career with Carmona Sports Club at 16. He represented Goa in matches against Benfica & Karachi Port Trust at Nova Goa ground in 1960 for the Goa selection. Figueiredo was also part of team that was supposed to tour in Portugal but that didn't take place following Goa's annexation by India. Menino Spent spent 13 years with Salgaocar, which he joined in 1959 and stayed with until the end of his career in 1971.

He also captained the Goa team in the Santosh Trophy in 1964 and 1965.

== Player profile ==
Figueiredo grew up in a rural environment before beginning his football career. He was known for being comfortable using either foot and for his ability in aerial play. His style of play was technical, and he was regarded as a physically resilient defender. Notably, he was never booked for a foul by a referee during his career.

“Menino was designated half-back, but his role was really that of a twin stopper. His build suited the role,” said former GFA secretary Antonio Botelho.
