= Visitacao Lobo =

Indian footballer

Personal information
- Date of birth: 1946
- Place of birth: Parra, Goa, India
- Date of death: 28 June 2014 (aged 68)
- Position: Striker

Senior career*
Years	Team	Apps	(Gls)
1962–1963	Asitos Saldanha		
1963–1966	Benfica		
1966–1970	Sesa		
1970–1971	Salgaocar		
1971–1980	Sesa		

International career
1970	India	1	(0)

Managerial career
- Goa (youth)
- * Club domestic league appearances and goals

Visitacao Lobo (died 28 June 2014) was an Indian professional footballer who played as a striker. He had played one match for the national team of India in 1970 as well as club football for Sesa and Salgaocar. He also represented Goa in the Santosh Trophy as captain. He is also known for being the first ever player from the state of Goa to play for India national team.
