= Derek D'Souza =

Indian footballer

Personal information
- Place of birth: Maharashtra, India
- Position: Forward

Senior career*
Years	Team	Apps	(Gls)
- Phoenix Mills
- Caltex SC

International career
- India

Managerial career
- 1992–1993: India
- * Club domestic league appearances and goals

Derek D'Souza is an Indian former footballer.

== Career ==
D'Souza is known for scoring the first ever goal for the India national football team in the AFC Asian Cup qualifiers in the 1960 qualifiers in which he scored the only goal in India's 1–0 victory over Pakistan.

He also served as head coach of the India national team from period of 1992–93. He is the brother of the former Indian footballer Neville D'Souza.

== Honours ==
India

- Merdeka Tournament runner-up: 1964

== See also ==
- List of India national football team managers
