= Dempo SC =

Association football club in India

Dempo
- Full name: Dempo Sports Club
- Nicknames: The Whites; The Golden Eagles
- Short name: DSC
- Founded: 1961; 65 years ago (as Clube Desportivo de Bicholim) 1967; 59 years ago (as Dempo Souza Sports Club)
- Ground: Duler Stadium
- Capacity: 10,000
- Owner: Dempo Group
- Head coach: Samir Naik
- League: Indian Football League
- 2025–26: Indian Football League, 5th of 10
- Website: demposportsclub.com
Home colours	Away colours	Third colours

Dempo Sports Club (Note: reference,), founded in 1961, is an Indian professional football club based in Carambolim, Goa. The club currently competes in the Indian Football League, the second tier of the Indian football league system, and the Goa Professional League. Dempo is owned and sponsored by the Dempo Mining Corporation Limited. Known popularly as "The Whites" and "The Golden Eagles", the club has been a constant participant in the National football championships, and gained immense popularity in the first four decades of its existence.

Dempo became the first Indian football club to reach the semi-final of the AFC Cup tournament in 2008. The club has won several accolades and honors. In the 2004–05 season, the club won its maiden National Football League title. They won the league again in the 2006–07 season, and followed it with the three I-League triumphs in 2007–08 in its inaugural version, and then in 2009–10, and again in 2011–12, making them the second most successful club on the national front with 5 domestic top-division league titles; after Kolkata giant Mohun Bagan.

The club has also won 14 Goa League Champions Cups, 4 Rovers Cups, 2 Indian Super Cups, Federation Cup in 2004, and Durand Cup in 2006. Dempo was the first Goan club to win Rovers cup. It also won the inaugural edition of AWES Cup in 2017 and won multiple times in Goa Police Cup. Dempo emerged as fifth ranked Indian team, and 711 universally, in the international rankings of clubs during the first ten years of the 21st century (2001–2010), issued by the International Federation of Football History & Statistics in 2011.

== History ==
=== Foundation and early history (1961–1980) ===
Dempo Sports Club was founded in Bicholim in 1961, as Clube Desportivo de Bicholim. The club was then a Goan First Division league side in the 1960s. Football lovers remember the Bicholim football club as one of the most talented in the country. Players including Subhash Sinari, Bernard Olivera, Tolentino Serrao, Bhaskar, Kalidas Gaad, Manohar Pednekar, Bhai Pednekar, Ganpat Gaonkar and Pandurang Gaonkar are still remembered as part of the Bicholim club that was on a completely different level compared other existing clubs at the time.

Bicholim Sports Club was later adopted by Dempo Souza in 1967 and was renamed Dempo Souza Sports Club. Even then the team remained one of the strongest team in the country with players like Eustaquio, Dass, Balaguru, Olavo, Colaco, Inacio, Felix Barreto, Thapa, Ramesh Redkar, Socrates Carvalho, Sadanand Asnodkar and Tulsidas Alornekar. In 1969, the team stood as the first runner-up in the Vasco Sports Club in the Senior Division League. The Dempo Souza Sports Club finally became Dempo Sports Club, after Dempo bought Mr Michael D'Souza's stake in the Dempo Souza enterprise. However, Dempo Sports Club prospered when Vasantrao Dempo, the chairman of the House of Dempo, extended his benefaction to football team in an extensive manner. Dempo then came at par with the other business houses, like Salgaocar, Agencia Commercial Maritima, Shantilal and Sesa Goa who had their own teams.

The club, started by Michael deSouza, still use the logo and colours that was chosen by him. They won their first Goan Senior League title in 1972. They then won their first ever national pan-India tournament in 1975 by winning the Rovers Cup. British coach Bob Bootland took charge of Dempo in 1978 and changed the way India looked at its football with a revolutionary 4–3–3 style of play. The club then won the Rovers Cup again in 1978. The club defended their title one year later in 1979. Their first double. Dempo clinched Stafford Challenge Cup titles in 1975 and 1979.

=== Gaining prominence (1980–2000) ===
Dempo then entered their "Golden-Age" during the 1980s. Dempo won a host of small cups and they also won the Rovers Cup again in 1986 by beating historic club Mohun Bagan. The club also won the Goan League in 1986 and 1987.

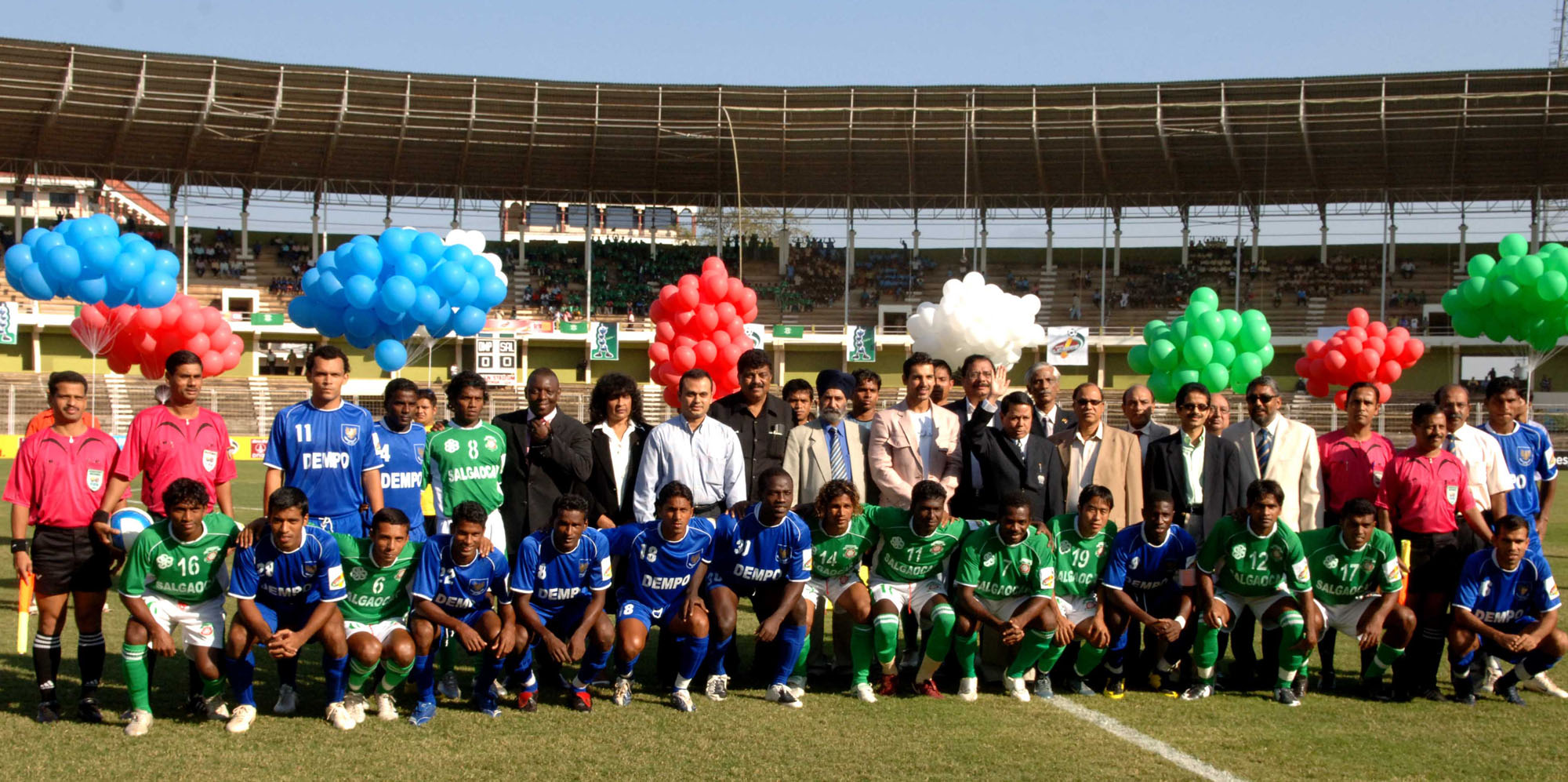
Players of Dempo SC (in blue) during their debut match at the 2007–08 I-League, against Salgaocar FC.

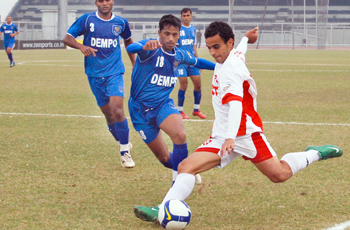
Dempo SC players (in blue) in action against JCT Mills, during the 2008–09 I-League at Guru Nanak Stadium in Ludhiana.

The club then went on to participate in their first international tournament named POMIS Cup in Malé, and achieved runner-up positions twice in 1991 and 1992. The club then won the Rovers Cup again by beating Mohun Bagan again and were then one of the original 12 teams in the first National Football League in 1996. The club then got relegated in 1999–2000 but got promoted the very next season.

=== Later years (2000–present) ===
Dempo won their first NFL championship in 2004. They also won the last NFL season. Later, they clinched Durand Cup title, thrashing JCT Mills by 2–0 in the 2006 final. Dempo then won the maiden I-League season in 2007–08. As a result of this title win, Dempo played in AFC competition in 2008 during the 2008 AFC Cup, and ended their campaign as semi-finalist, losing to Lebanese club Safa 5–1 in aggregate. They again won the domestic league in 2009–10 and 2011–12.

In 2011, Dempo signed Trinidadian and Tobago international Densill Theobald as marquee player, who represented his nation at the 2006 FIFA World Cup. After the 2012–13 season, where Dempo finished in 5th place, they parted ways with their most successful coach Armando Colaco, with whom they had won 5 League titles. They appointed Arthur Papas, who had previously been the head coach of the Indian U23 Men's National Team. Dempo finished their 2013–14 campaign with a 4th-place finish.

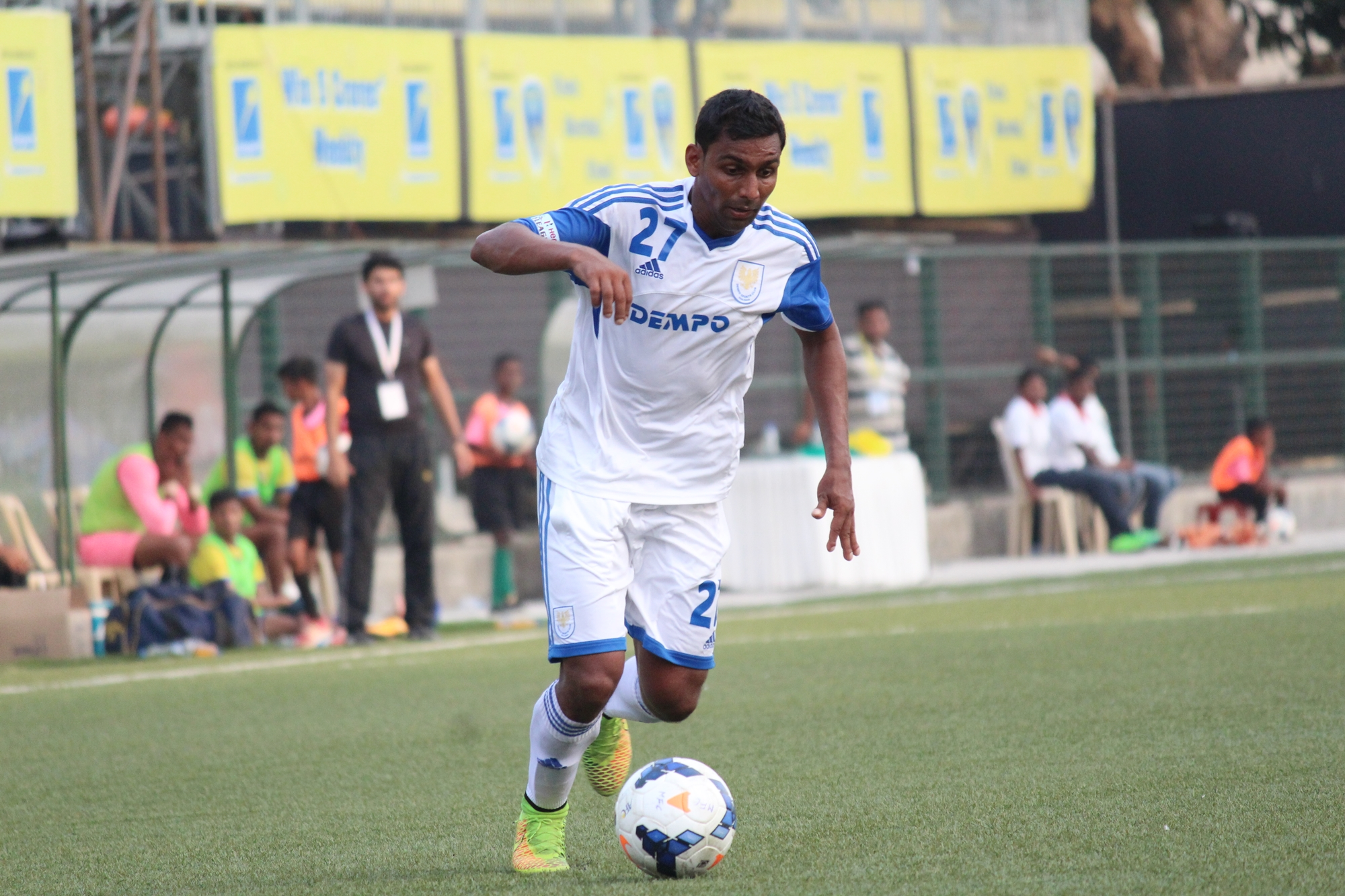
Joy Ferrao of Dempo SC in action against Mumbai FC during the 2014–15 I-League.

In March 2015, after losing their final match to fellow Goan and relegation threatened club Salgaocar 2–0, they got relegated for the first time from I-league and later participated in I-League 2nd Division. In 2015–16 I-League Second Division season, they clinched title. Then, the club was hit by numerous injuries, which had ruined their season in the top division. Before the start of the 2016–17 season, Dempo, along with fellow Goan clubs, Salgaocar FC and Sporting Clube, announced their withdrawal from the I-League. After their withdrawal from I-League, Dempo participated later editions of the I-League 2nd Division, the second tier of Indian football league system.

In the 2021–22 Goa Professional League season, Samir Naik managed Dempo end decade long wait, and clinched the title in style. In February–March 2023, the club participated in Stafford Challenge Cup in Bangalore. In July 2023, Dempo roped in Scottish-Indian football pundit and manager Pradhyum Reddy as club's CEO. The club later won GFA Charity Cup in August 2023, beating Sporting Goa in final. In that month of the same year, Dempo gained an I-League 3 spot to compete in the inaugural edition. In that edition, they reached play-offs, finished second and secured promotion to I-League 2. The club ended their I-League 2 campaign on a high note with 27 points in 14 matches, achieved second place and earned promotion to the 2024–25 I-League. Thus, Dempo returned to the I-League after a gap of nine years.

Dempo became part of the 2024 Bhausaheb Bandodkar Memorial Trophy in August 2024. The club began the tournament campaign with a 5–1 defeat to A-League Men club Brisbane Roar on 24 August, in which the only goal was scored through a header by Shallum Pires. In the 2024–25 I-League season, Dempo's Trinidadian striker Marcus Joseph scored two hat-tricks in their 8–1 win against SC Bengaluru and 5–2 win against Aizawl. As the league season wrapped up, Dempo secured a 4–3 away win against title contender Gokulam Kerala on the final day (April 6), finishing on sixth place with 29 points, while their arch-rival Churchill Brothers finished on top of the table and secured promotion to the Indian Super League.

== Crest & colours ==
Dempo's crest from 1968 to 2010

The Dempo Sports Club crest is the official logo for Dempo Corporations sports clubs that it owns. The logo includes the words Goa (name of the state Dempo is based in) and Dempo Sports Club (team name). The logo also includes a picture of a golden bird in the middle of the crest.

The official colours of Dempo Sports Club are blue and white. Ever since their creation Dempo's home colours have always involved blue, mainly with the shirts while the shorts were always either blue or black. The away colours were always all white but then in 2011 when Dempo unveiled their away kit the shirt had black stripes on it. The shorts however remain the same.

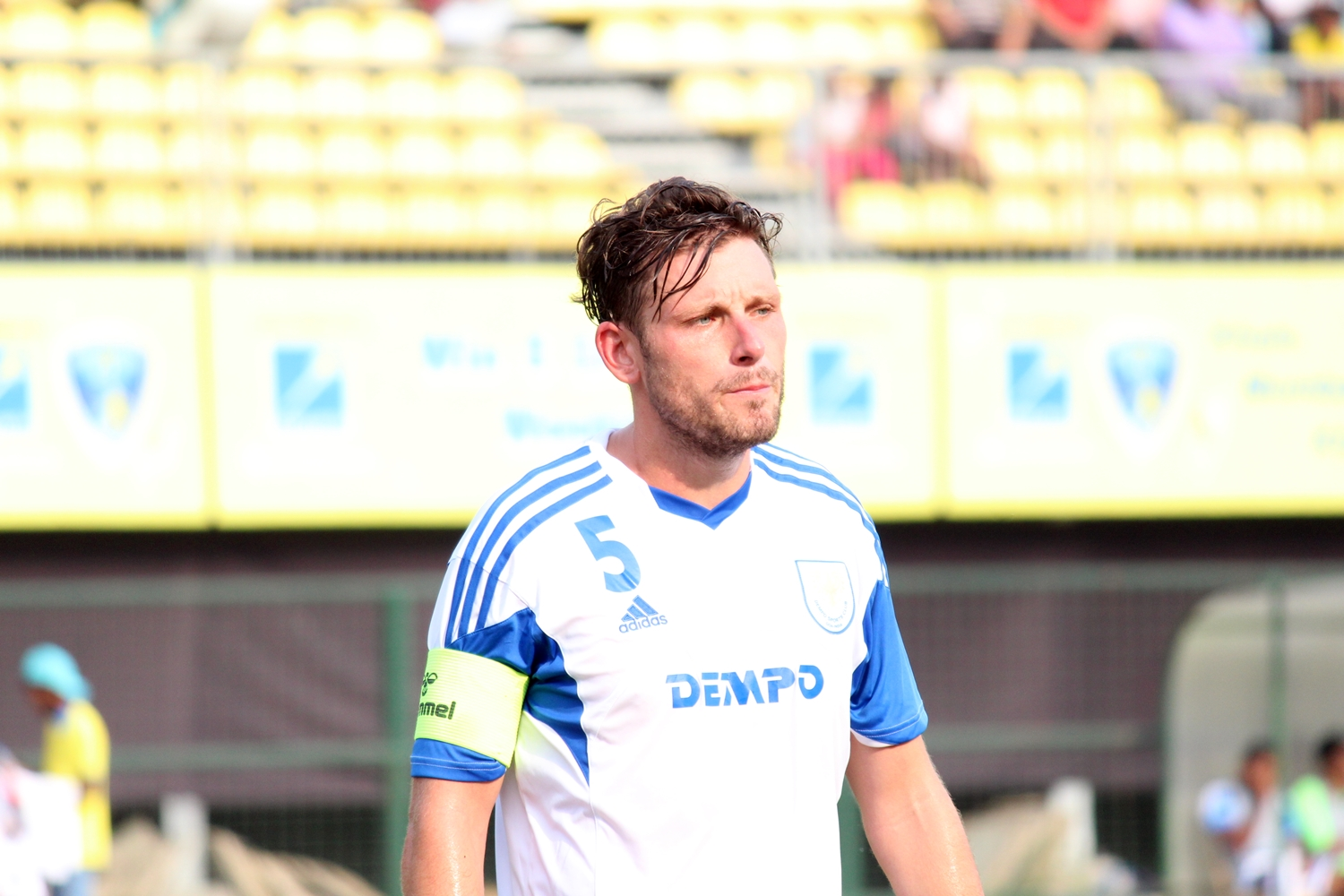
English centre-back Calum James Angus in away kit of Dempo in 2015

Ahead of the club's 2020–21 football season, the Golden Eagles introduced the new home and away jerseys to show solidarity towards the health workers in Goa. The team announced that they will proudly bear the words "Thank You Goa's Covid Warriors" on their Home and Away jerseys.

== Rivalries ==
Dempo has a major rivalry with their fellow Goan side Churchill Brothers, popularly known as "Goan Derby". Both the teams are jointly most successful clubs in I-League, having won the title thrice.

They also have rivalries with other two Goan sides Sporting Clube de Goa, and Salgaocar, whom they faced in I-League and face in Goa Professional League.

== Stadium ==
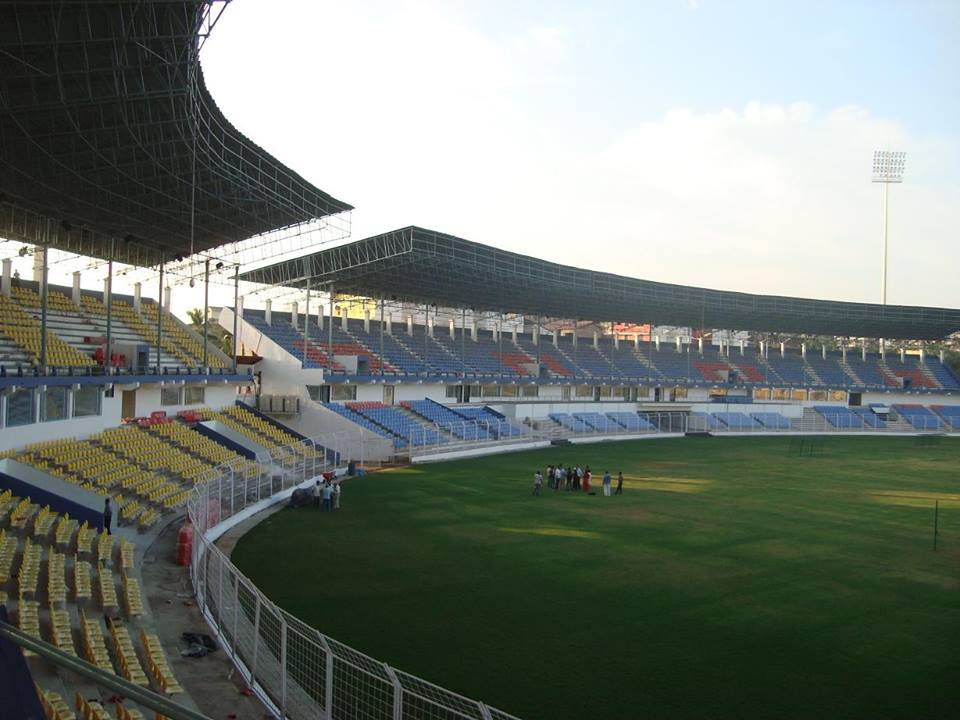
The Fatorda Stadium, home of Dempo.

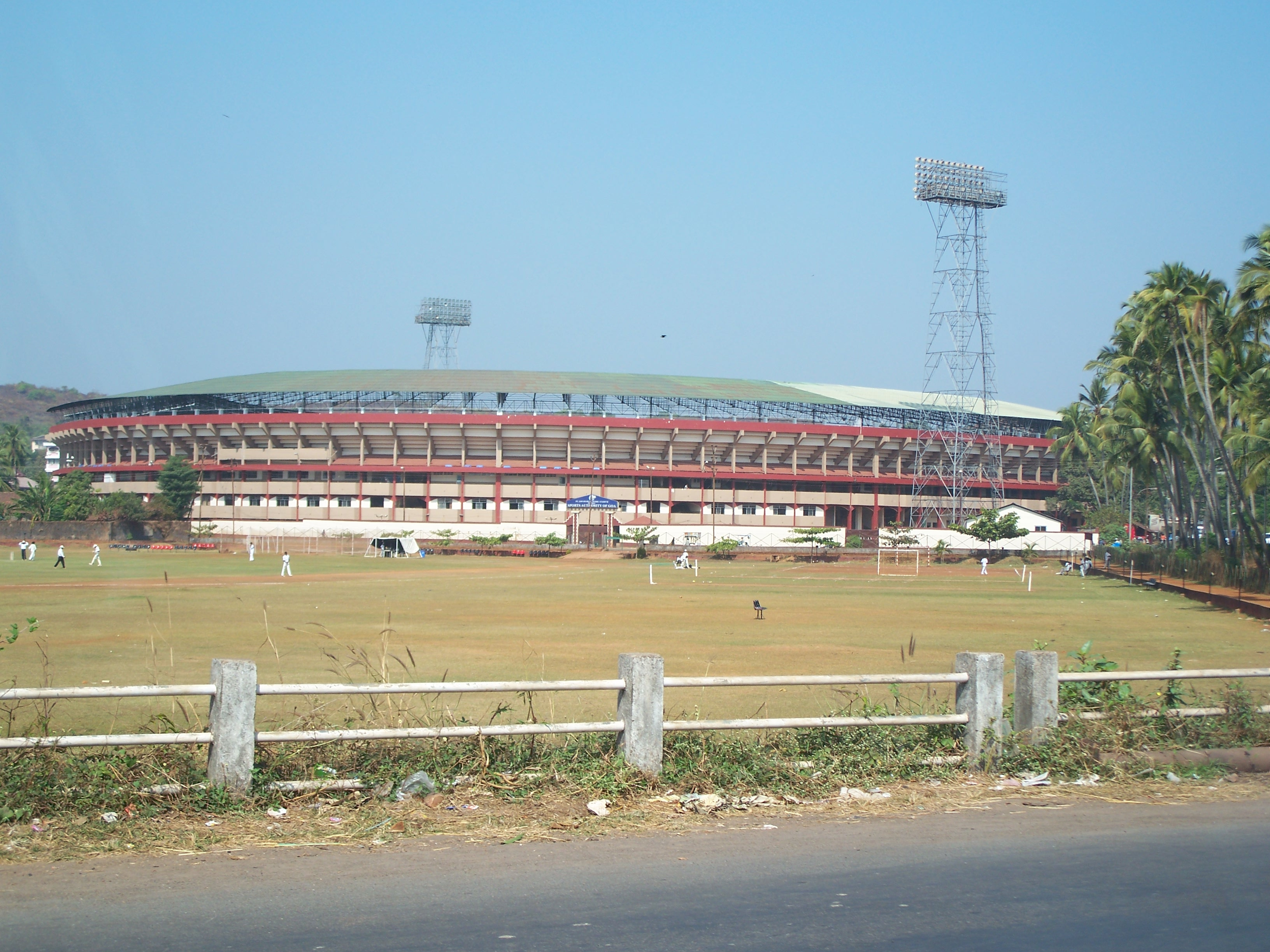
The exterior of the stadium

Dempo SC initially used the Fatorda Stadium in Margao for home matches in the domestic and regional leagues.

The 19,000-capacity Fatorda Stadium opened in 1989 and Dempo SC uses it for most of its I-League matches. The stadium also served as club's home ground in continental tournaments including the AFC Cup. Nagoa Ground in Mapusa became the home ground of Dempo during the 2012–13 I-League, alongside Tilak Maidan. The stadium got its astroturf in 2012 as part of FIFA's Win in India with India program. Dempo moved to Fatorda Stadium for the 2024–25 season of I-League.

=== Training ground ===
Sircaim was used as a destination for the training of Dempo, the other being at Sanquelim. The Sesa Football Academy Ground is located at Sircaim and they used it for pre-season training from 2014 to 2015.

=== Ella Academy Ground ===
A 48,450-square-meter training complex in Old Goa, the Ella Academy, was opened in 2017 by Dempo. Ella Academy Ground has also been used as the home ground for the club's both senior and junior teams.

== Ownership and finances ==
Dempo Sports Club's main sponsor and owner is Dempo Mining Corporation Limited. The club has been owned by Dempo since their creation. As part of the sponsorship from Dempo the club also named itself Dempo Sports Club and is classed as an institutional club in that case.

The finances given to the club are very limited which meant that the club was forced to spend less on infrastructure and proven players and spend more on local youth development.

== Kit manufacturers and shirt sponsors ==
Period	Kit manufacturer	Shirt sponsor
2006–2011	none	Dempo
2011–2014	Nike	Dempo
2014–2015	Adidas	Dempo
2015–2016	7070 Sports	Dempo
2016–present	Shiv Naresh	Dempo

== Players ==
=== First-team squad ===
As of February 2025

Note: Flags indicate national team as defined under FIFA eligibility rules; some limited exceptions apply. Players may hold more than one non-FIFA nationality.

No.	Pos.	Nation	Player
-	GK	IND	Mohamed Zaheer Khan
1	DF	IND	Ayan Bhattacharya
1	DF	IND	Myrick Hilario Pednekar
5	DF	IND	Pruthvesh Pednekar
2	DF	IND	Daniel Muthu
21	DF	IND	Darell Mascarenhas
4	DF	IND	Athul Unnikrishnan
15	MF	IND	Saiesh Bagkar

No.	Pos.	Nation	Player
17	DF	IND	Mohamed Ali
19	DF	IND	Rohan Sharma
21	MF	IND	Darrel Mascarenhas
23	MF	IND	Seigoumang Doungel
27	MF	IND	Nestor Dias
37	MF	IND	Mohamed Ali
38	MF	IND	Laximanrao Rane

== Technical staff ==
As of 8 November 2016

Position	Name
CEO	(Scotland) Pradyum Reddy
Head coach	(India) Samir Naik
Goalkeeping coach	(India) Richard Sanchez

== List of coaches ==
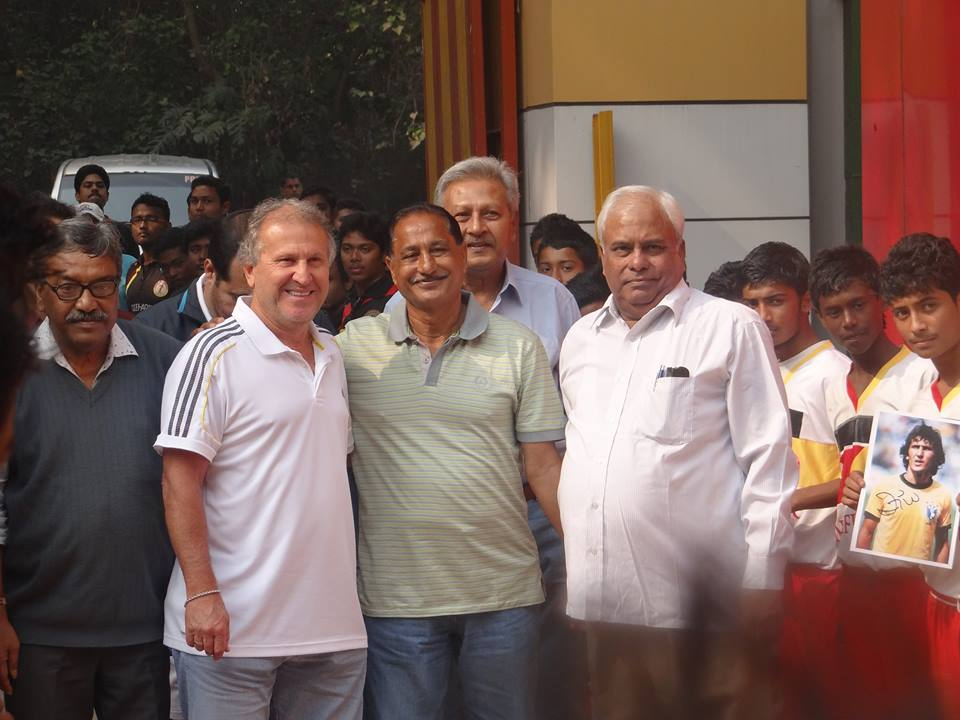
Armando Colaco (center) with Brazilian football legend Zico (left). Colaco guided Dempo to win five national league titles.

Dempo roped in their first foreign coach in 1977, when British national Robert "Bob" Bootland joined the club as a trainer. The club hired their first professional manager in 2000, Armando Colaco; he remained with the club until the end of season 2012–13 and gave five domestic league titles. In June 2013, the club signed Greek-Australian manager Arthur Papas who was already working in India as the Indian U23 National Team coach.

Name	Nationality	From	To	Honours	Ref.
Cyril Ferrao	India	1967	1971	N/A	
Joseph Rathnam	India	1971	1977	Rovers Cup (1975), Stafford Challenge Cup (1975), Nizam Gold Cup (1975), Plaza Cup (1975), Bordoloi Shield (1975), Bandodkar Gold Trophy (1976), Goa Professional League (1972; 1974), Taça Goa (1977), Pele Cup (1977)	
Robert "Bob" Bootland	England	1977	1981	Rovers Cup (1978), Durand Cup (1983)	
Amal Dutta	India	1981	1982	Goa Senior Division League (1981)	
GMH Basha	India	1982	1984	N/A	
Maqbool Hammed	India	1984	1985	Sher-I-Kashmir Cup (1984), Jalil Cup (1984)	
Kuppuswami Sampath	India	1985	1989	N/A	
Alberto Joannes	India	1989	1992	Goa Senior Division League (1989)	
Socorro Coutinho	India	1992	1994	Scissors Cup (1992; 1994)	
Walter Ormeño	Peru	1994	1996	N/A	
Francisco Goncalves da Silva	Brazil	1996	1998	N/A	
T. K. Chathunni	India	1998	1999	N/A	
Ahmad Sanjari	Iran	1999	2000	N/A	
Armando Colaco	India	2000	2013	I-League (2007–08, 2009–10, 2011–12), Indian Super Cup (2008, 2010), Federation Cup (2004), Durand Cup (2006)	
Arthur Papas	Australia Greece	June 2013	March 2015	N/A	
Trevor Morgan	England	March 2015	November 2015	N/A	
Mauricio Afonso	India	November 2015	July 2017	N/A	
Samir Naik	India	July 2017	till date	Goa Professional League (2022–23)	

== Notable players ==
=== Foreign internationals ===
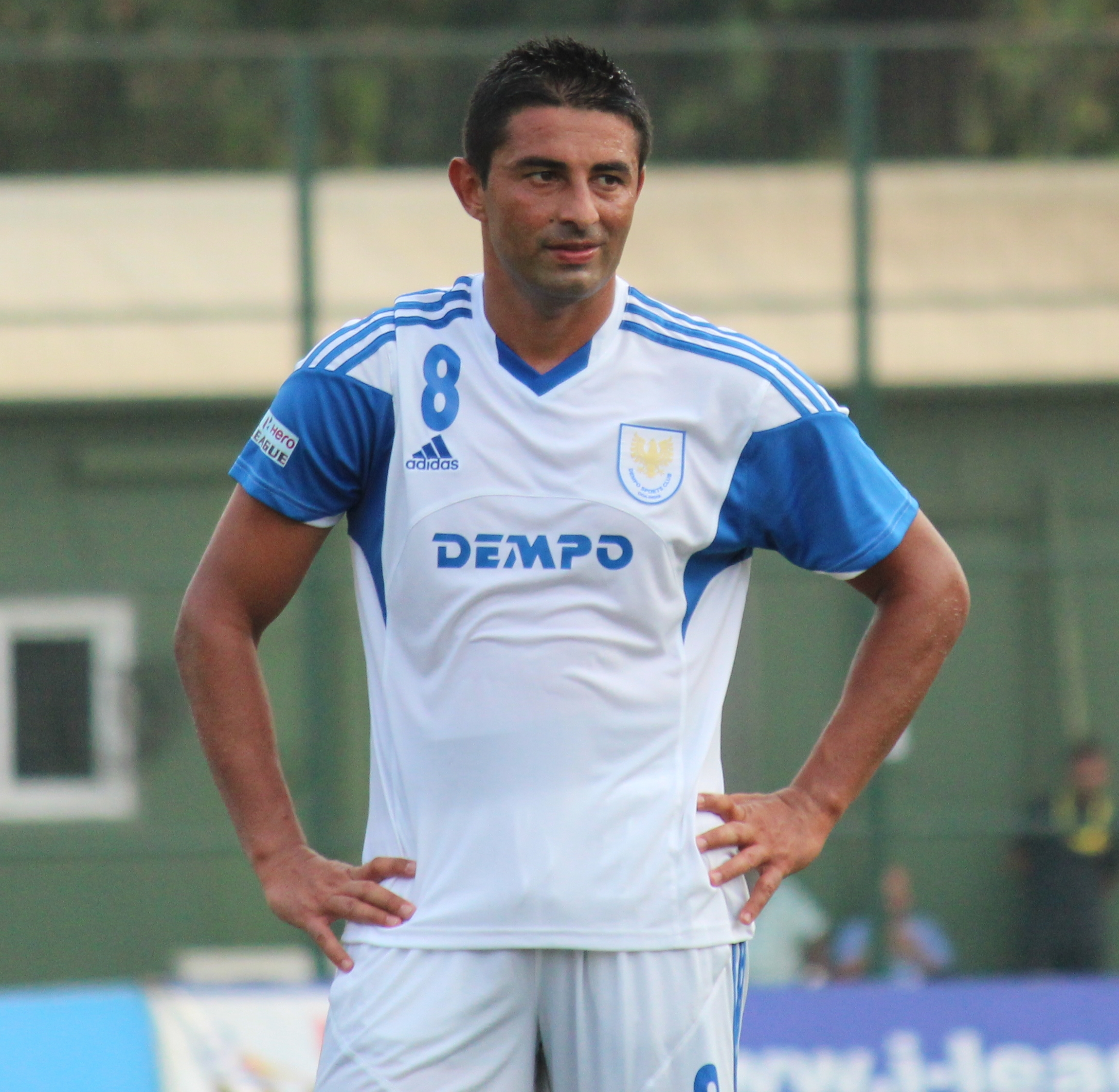
Costa Rican international Carlos Hernández, who appeared in 2006 FIFA World Cup, with Dempo in 2015.

- The players below had senior international cap(s) for their respective countries. Players whose name is listed, represented their countries before or after playing for Dempo SC.
- (Uzbekistan) Sergey Andreyev (2002–2003)
- (Trinidad and Tobago) Densill Theobald (2011–2012)
- (Australia) Simon Colosimo (2013–2014)
- (Sri Lanka) Kasun Jayasuriya (2000–2001)
- (Sri Lanka) Channa Ediri Bandanage (2002–2003)
- (Indonesia) Beto Gonçalves (2010)
- (Afghanistan) Zohib Islam Amiri (2014–2015)
- (Northern Cyprus) Billy Mehmet (2013)
- (Liberia) Johnny Menyongar (2013)
- (Costa Rica) Carlos Hernández (2015)
- (Liberia) Sunday Seah (2003–2004)
- (Nepal) Upendra Man Singh (1999–2000)
- (Ghana) Stephen Offei (2012)
- (Trinidad and Tobago) Marcus Joseph (2025–)

=== Other notable players ===
- (Nigeria) Ranti Martins (2004–2012) – all-time top goalscorer for Dempo (with 146 league goals in 164 matches)
- Sunil Chhetri (2009–2010) – all-time top goalscorer of the India national team

== Affiliated clubs ==
The following clubs were affiliated with Dempo SC:

- (Denmark) FC Midtjylland (2011–2012)
- (India) FC Goa (2014–2016)

== Performance in AFC competitions ==
- AFC Champions League: 2 appearances

2009: Play-off round
2011: Qualifying play-off

- AFC Cup: 5 appearances

2005: Group stage
2006: Group stage
2008: Semi-final
2009: Round of 16
2011: Round of 16

== Records and statistics ==
=== Overall records ===
- Most individual goals in a match of I-League: 7 by (Nigeria) Ranti Martins – Dempo vs Air India in 2010–11.
- Maximum number of goals in one edition of I-League: 32 by (Nigeria) Ranti Martins, in 2011–12.
- Biggest winning margin in I-League: 14–0 (Dempo SC vs Air India in 2010–11 season, at Margao).
- Most goals scored in a match: 14, Dempo SC (14) vs Air India (0), 2010–11.
- Most number of goals scored by a team in one edition of I-League: 63 in 26 matches, in 2010–11.
- Highest margin of victory in continental tournament: 6–1 vs. (Turkmenistan) Merw FK (May 16, 2006; 2006 AFC Cup).
- Retired number: 10 – (Brazil) Cristiano Junior (2004; posthumous honour).
- Most individual goals in a single match in I-League: 6 by (Nigeria) Ranti Martins, Dempo vs Air India, in 2010–11.
- Most successful team in the NFL/I-League: with 4 titles.
- Maximum wins in a single edition of the top division league in India: 18 wins in 2011–12 I-League.
- Leading goal scorer of Dempo SC (all-time): (Nigeria) Ranti Martins (146 goals; including 45 goals in NFL and 101 goals in I-League).
- I-League Golden Boot winner representing Dempo: (Nigeria) Ranti Martins (twice, in 2010–11 and 2011–12).
- All time leading goalscorer of Dempo in continental competitions: (Nigeria) Ranti Martins (18 goals).
- Dempo SC coach conferred with Dronacharya Award: (India) Armando Colaco (spell at the club: 2000–2013).

=== Award(s) ===
- IndianFootball.com Awards — Team of the Year: 2003

=== Notable wins against foreign teams ===
As of matches played 28 August 2019

Competition	Round	Date	Opposition	Score	Venue	Ref
DCM Trophy	Group stage	12 October 1974	Port Authority of Thailand	2–1	Ambedkar Stadium	
AFC Cup	Group stage	16 May 2006	(Turkmenistan) Merw FK	6–1	Fatorda Stadium	
AFC Cup	Group stage	11 March 2008	(Lebanon) Al Ansar	3–1	Fatorda Stadium	
AFC Cup	Group stage	17 April 2008	(Bahrain) Al Ansar	2–1	Bahrain National Stadium	
AFC Cup	Group stage	14 May 2008	(Oman) Sur	5–2	Fatorda Stadium	
AFC Cup	Quarter-final	29 September 2008	(Singapore) Home United	4–3	Jalan Besar Stadium	
AFC Cup	Group stage	10 March 2009	(Syria) Al Majd	1–0	Fatorda Stadium	
AFC Cup	Group stage	19 May 2009	(Jordan) Al Faisaly	3–1	Fatorda Stadium	
AFC Cup	Group stage	1 March 2011	(Yemen) Al Tilal	2–1	Shree Shiv Chhatrapati Sports Complex	

== Honours ==
Widely considered one of the most successful clubs in the Indian football circuit due to their domestic exploits, the club also holds the distinct honour of becoming the first Indian club to reach the Semi-Finals of the AFC Cup in 2008.

=== Domestic ===
==== League ====
- NFL/I-League
  - Champions (5): 2004–05, 2006–07, 2007–08, 2009–10, 2011–12
  - Runners-up (1): 2003–04
  - Third place (1): 2010–11
- NFL II/I-League 2
  - Champions (2): 2001–02, 2015–16
  - Runners-up (1): 2023–24
- I-League 3
  - Runners-up (1): 2023–24
- Goa Football League/Goa Professional League
  - Champions (16): 1972, 1974, 1979, 1980, 1981, 1984, 1987, 1988, 1994, 2005, 2007, 2009, 2010, 2011, 2021–22, 2022–23
  - Runners-up (4): 1984–85, 2006–07, 2019–20, 2024–25
  - Third place (1): 2023–24
- GFA Monsoon League
  - Champions (1): 2025

==== Cup ====
- Federation Cup
  - Champions (1): 2004
  - Runners-up (5): 1996, 2001, 2008, 2012, 2014–15
- Indian Super Cup
  - Champions (2): 2008, 2010
  - Runners-up (3): 2005, 2007, 2009
- Durand Cup
  - Champions (1): 2006
- Rovers Cup
  - Champions (4): 1975, 1979, 1980, 1986
  - Runners-up (1): 1989–90
- Bordoloi Trophy
  - Champions (2): 1982, 1983
  - Runners-up (1): 1981
- Nizam Gold Cup
  - Champions (1): 1978
- Scissors Cup
  - Champions (3): 1992, 1994, 1996
- Sait Nagjee Football Tournament
  - Runners-up (2): 1971, 1995
- Bandodkar Gold Trophy
  - Champions (8): 1976, 1978, 1982, 1983, 1984, 1986, 1990, 1991
  - Runners-up (4): 1971, 1973, 1975, 2016
- Goa Police Cup
  - Champions (1): 2005
  - Runners-up (2): 1999, 2021, 2023
- Stafford Challenge Cup
  - Champions (2): 1975, 1979
  - Runners-up (1): 1986

=== Continental ===
- AFC Cup
  - Semi-finals (1): 2008

=== Invitational ===
- Maldives International Cup
  - Champions (1): 1991
- (Maldives) POMIS Invitational Cup
  - Runners-up (2): 1991, 1992

=== Other honours ===
- Sher-I-Kashmir Gold Cup
  - Champions (1): 1985
- Jalil Cup (Varanasi)
  - Champions (1): 1985
- Plaza Soccer Trophy
  - Champions (1): 1975
- Taca Goa Championship
  - Champions (3): 1977, 1979, 1990
- Four Square Trophy
  - Champions (1): 1982
- Arlem Soccer Cup
  - Champions (1): 1985
- SFC Inter-Club Trophy
  - Champions (1): 2000
- Goa Governor's Cup
  - Runners-up (3): 2002, 2005, 2007
- AWES Cup
  - Champions (1): 2017
- GFA Charity Cup
  - Champions (2): 2021, 2023
  - Runners-up (2): 2018, 2019
- Nagaradakshya United Cup
  - Runners-up (1): 2014
- DSK Invitational Cup
  - Runners-up (1): 2015

== Dempo youth & academy ==
Dempo SC Football Academy gained an 'elite category' accreditation by the All India Football Federation in December 2023. Club's youth and academy teams competed in the Youth League of India. The club clinched GFA U-19 League title in 2025.

== See also ==
- List of football clubs in Goa
- List of Goan State Football Champions
- Indian football clubs in Asian competitions

== Footnotes ==
1. Densill Theobald of Trinidad and Tobago and Carlos Hernández of Costa Rica have appeared in FIFA World Cup before joining Dempo SC.
2. Also known as 'POMIS International Cup' [not POMIS Cup]; Dempo captained by Camilo Gonsalves took part in the tournament in Malé and defeated local side New Radiant 5–4 via the tie-breaker (penalty shoot-out) in the final.
3. The POMIS Cup (fully known as: 'President of Maldives Invitational Soccer Cup') an international club football tournament incorporated in 1987, is the only international club tournament held in the Maldives, organized by the Football Association of Maldives (FAM).
