= Bert Flatley =

English footballer (1919–1987)

Personal information
- Full name: Albert Austin Flatley
- Date of birth: 5 September 1919
- Place of birth: Bradford, England
- Date of death: 9 April 1987 (aged 67)
- Place of death: Yeadon, West Yorkshire, England
- Height: 5 ft 9 in (1.75 m)
- Position: Inside forward

Senior career*
| Years | Team | Apps | (Gls) |
| 1937–1938 | Wolverhampton Wanderers | 0 | (0) |
| 1938–1939 | York City | 4 | (0) |
| 1939–1944 | Port Vale | 2 | (0) |
| 1944–1946 | Bradford Park Avenue | 0 | (0) |
| 1946–1948 | Bury | 0 | (0) |
| 1948–1950 | Alessandria | | |
| 1950–1952 | Workington | 8 | (0) |
| Total | | 14+ | (0+) |

Managerial career
- 1948–1950: Alessandria
- 1950–1952: Workington
- 1954–1955: India (assistant)
- 1955: Bombay
- * Club domestic league appearances and goals

Albert Austin Flatley (5 September 1919 – 9 April 1987) was an English footballer and football manager. An inside-forward, he was signed to Wolverhampton Wanderers, York City, Port Vale, Bradford, and Bury in the periods immediately before and after World War II. He then turned to coaching with Italian club Alessandria, before spending two years in charge at Workington from 1950 to 1952.

== Career ==
=== Club career ===
Flatley was on the books of Wolverhampton Wanderers, before joining York City. His stay at Bootham Crescent was brief, as he played four Third Division North games for the "Minstermen" in the 1938–39 season. He joined Port Vale in June 1939, playing the opening two Third Division South games of the 1939–40 season before World War II stopped all professional football in England. During wartime he guested for Bradford Park Avenue, Bradford City and Halifax Town, before joining Bradford Park Avenue permanently in July 1944. After this he continued guesting for Halifax and later Hartlepool United. In December 1946, he transferred to Norman Bullock's Bury, though he never made his Second Division debut at Gigg Lane.

=== Player-manager ===
He played in Italy for Alessandria Calcio between 1948 and 1950, and also coached alongside Carlo Carcano, before returning to England as player-manager of non-League Workington in August 1950. At the end of the 1951–52 season, Workington were elected to the Football League. However, Flatley resigned just after they had been re-elected, and the club went on to finish bottom of the league.

=== Managerial career ===
Flatley had a coaching stint in India in 1954 where he was the assistant coach to the then India national team coach Syed Abdul Rahim at the 1954 Colombo Cup. He also managed the Bombay and India football teams for a brief period during the Soviet football team tour to India in 1955.

== Career statistics ==
=== Playing statistics ===
Appearances and goals by club, season and competition
| Club | Season | League | | | FA Cup | | Other | | Total | |
| Club | Season | Division | Apps | Goals | Apps | Goals | Apps | Goals | Apps | Goals |
|---|---|---|---|---|---|---|---|---|---|---|
| Wolverhampton Wanderers | 1937–38 | First Division | 0 | 0 | 0 | 0 | 0 | 0 | 0 | 0 |
| York City | 1938–39 | Third Division North | 4 | 0 | 0 | 0 | 0 | 0 | 4 | 0 |
| Port Vale | 1939–40 | – | 0 | 0 | 0 | 0 | 2 | 0 | 2 | 0 |
| Bradford Park Avenue | 1945–46 | – | 0 | 0 | 1 | 0 | 0 | 0 | 1 | 0 |
| Bury | 1946–47 | Second Division | 0 | 0 | 0 | 0 | 0 | 0 | 0 | 0 |
| Workington | 1951–52 | Third Division North | 8 | 0 | 0 | 0 | 0 | 0 | 8 | 0 |

=== Managerial statistics ===
Managerial record by team and tenure
| Team | From | To | Record | | | | |
| Team | From | To | P | W | D | L | Win % |
|---|---|---|---|---|---|---|---|
| Workington | 1 August 1950 | 1 June 1952 | 50 | 13 | 8 | 29 | 26.0 |
| India | 1955 | | 3 | 0 | 0 | 3 | 0.0 |
