= Bob Bootland =

English football manager

Personal information
- Full name: Robert Allison Bootland
- Place of birth: Newcastle upon Tyne, England
- Date of death: 13 June 2007 (aged 72)
- Place of death: Bambolim, India

Managerial career
- Years: Team
- 1977–1982: Dempo SC
- 1982: India
- JCT Mills
- Dempo SC
- 1987: India (assistant coach)
- Sesa Goa FC
- MRF FC
- Dempo SC
- ????–1998: Vasco SC
- Tatas FC

Robert Allison Bootland (died 13 June 2007) was an English professional football coach active primarily in India. He was the first foreign club coach in India. Bootland was described as "a taskmaster with a no-nonsense attitude."

== Career ==
Robert Allison Bootland was born in Newcastle upon Tyne, England. He first arrived in India in 1977 as a tourist, and after being invited to watch a senior league game involving Dempo SC, Bootland decided to stay in India and become a full-time professional football coach.

Bootland began his football coaching career with Dempo SC, the same club which had inspired his new-found career. Bootland said, " had been to this wonderful land to meet my friend's parents. Dempo management invited to me to watch the game. I found the Goans good footballers. Soon the coaching offer came and I accepted it." Bootland won the Rovers Cup with Dempo in only his second year in charge, 1978, after introducing a 4–3–3 formation; the side was described as "[a] well balanced side" who were "in peak physical condition." After a brief spell as manager of the Indian national side in 1982, Bootland then became coach of JCT Mills winning the Durand Cup in 1983. Bootland later returned to Dempo SC, where he won the Rovers Cup for a second time in 1986. Bootland returned to the Indian national side – this time as an assistant coach – in 1987 for that year's edition of the Nehru Cup. Bootland then coached club sides Sesa Goa FC and MRF FC, before becoming coach of Vasco SC. He was sacked as Vasco manager in October 1998. Bootland ended his coaching career with Tatas FC.

In his later career, Bootland became an outspoken critic of Indian football, claiming that, "politics in Indian football is killing the players."

=== Honours ===
- Rovers Cup – 2
  - 1978, 1986
- Durand Cup – 1
  - 1983

== Personal life ==
Bootland was married to an Indian woman named Fatima who was a schoolteacher and amateur athlete. The couple had two sons named Allison and Ronald.

== Death ==
Bootland died on 13 June 2007 in a hospital in Bambolim after complaining of chest pains. He was aged either 72, or 73. The cause of death was later determined to be a heart attack.
