= Savio Medeira =

Indian footballer and manager

Personal information
- Date of birth: 20 March 1965 (age 61)
- Place of birth: Margao, India
- Position: Midfielder

Senior career*
Years	Team	Apps	(Gls)
1983–2000	Salgaocar	676	(84)

Managerial career
- 2000–2001: Salgaocar (assistant coach)
- 2001–2008: Salgaocar
- 2008–2011: India (assistant coach)
- 2011–2012: India
- 2012–2015: India (assistant coach)
- 2017–2019: India (technical director)
- 2019-2021: India (technical director)
- * Club domestic league appearances and goals

Savio Medeira (born 20 March 1965) is an Indian football manager and former player who is current technical director (interim) of the India national football team. He is currently serving as the technical director of SC de Goa.

== Playing career ==
Savio spent his whole career at Salgaocar S.C. in India from 1983-2000. While with Salgaocar Savio won two Rover Cups in 1990 and 1997. He also won the Federation Cup in 1997 and even the National Football League in 1998.

== Coaching career ==
=== Salgaocar ===
Savio, after retiring from playing, decided to begin coaching. He began his coaching career by acting as assistant coach at his former playing club Salgaocar for the 2000-01 season. While acting assistant Salgaocar finished the 2000-01 NFL season in sixth place. After acting as assistant coach for one season he was promoted to head manager of the club. His first season with the club Savio managed to get Salgaocar to fourth place in the 2001-02 NFL season. The next season though Savio managed to make Salgaocar runners-up in the league only five points behind champions East Bengal. He then continued his success with Salgaocar by winning the Durand Cup in 2003 by beating East Bengal 4-3 on penalties. The next season though Salgaocar dropped to seventh in the league and did not win a single trophy. Then in 2006 Salgaocar were relegated to the NFL 2nd Division. Salgaocar though were only forced to one season in the second division as they were promoted for the 2007–08 I-League but were again relegated as they finished dead last with only one win out of eighteen games. After the 2007-08 season Savio was sacked by Salgaocar.

=== Assisting India ===
After being sacked by Salgaocar Savio signed with the All India Football Federation to become the assistant coach to Bob Houghton on the India national football team. His first match as assistant coach was against Chinese Taipei in which India won 3-0. While as assistant coach to Bob Houghton the India National Team changed and won two Nehru Cup titles along with winning the 2008 AFC Challenge Cup and booking their place in the 2011 AFC Asian Cup. During the Asian Cup however India lost all three matches by heavy margins and so Bob Houghton was officially sacked but Savio stayed and Bob's successor Armando Colaco also kept Savio on the team. While assisting Colaco, India went on a low run of form as they slipped from 147 in the FIFA rankings to 163. After getting knocked out of the 2014 FIFA World Cup Qualifiers Colaco left his post as India coach while again Savio stayed on.

=== As India Coach ===
On 29 October 2011, it was announced that Savio would be the head coach of the India national football team till his contract ran out with the AIFF in May 2012. His first assignment was to win the 2011 SAFF Cup in December 2011. He coached India for the first time on 13 November 2011 against Malaysia in the Indira Gandhi Athletic Stadium in Guwahati, Assam. The match ended 1–1 with Syed Rahim Nabi scoring the equalizer in the 88th minute and becoming the first Indian to score for India in the Savio reign.

After two more matches which India won and lost respectively to Malaysia and Zambia, Savio lead India into his first competitive match as coach of India in the SAFF Cup against Afghanistan on 3 December 2011. The match ended 1–1. Savio then earned his first ever competitive win for India in the next match on 5 December 2011 against Bhutan in which India won 5–0. He then managed to bring India to the semi-finals after a 3–0 victory over Sri Lanka in their final group match. The semi-final match was against Maldives on 9 December 2011 in which India won 3–1. Then in the final of the SAFF Cup India managed to beat Afghanistan 4–0 and thus Savio won his first championship with India sense taking over 2 months before.

Going into 2012, India played German Bundesliga side Bayern Munich in New Delhi, in which India lost 4–0. Savio then received his second assignment which was to do well in the 2012 AFC Challenge Cup. India played against Oman and Azerbaijan and lost both matches. India then went on to lose all 3 AFC Challenge Cup matches. After the AFC Challenge Cup Savio was relieved of his coaching deal.

== Statistics ==
=== Manager ===
As of 24 May 2012.

Team	From	To	Record				
Team	From	To	G	W	D	L	Win %
Salgaocar	2001	2008	135	44	45	46	32.59
India	2011	2012	15	5	2	8	33.33
Total			150	49	47	54	32.67

== Honours ==
=== Player ===
India

- SAFF Championship: 1997; runner-up: 1995

Salgaocar

- National Football League: 1998
- Federation Cup: 1997
- Rovers Cup: 1990, 1997

=== Manager ===
India

- SAFF Championship: 2011

Salgaocar

- Durand Cup: 2003
- National Football League runner-up: 2002-03

== See also ==
- List of India national football team managers
