= Rustam Akramov =

Uzbek football coach (1948–2022)

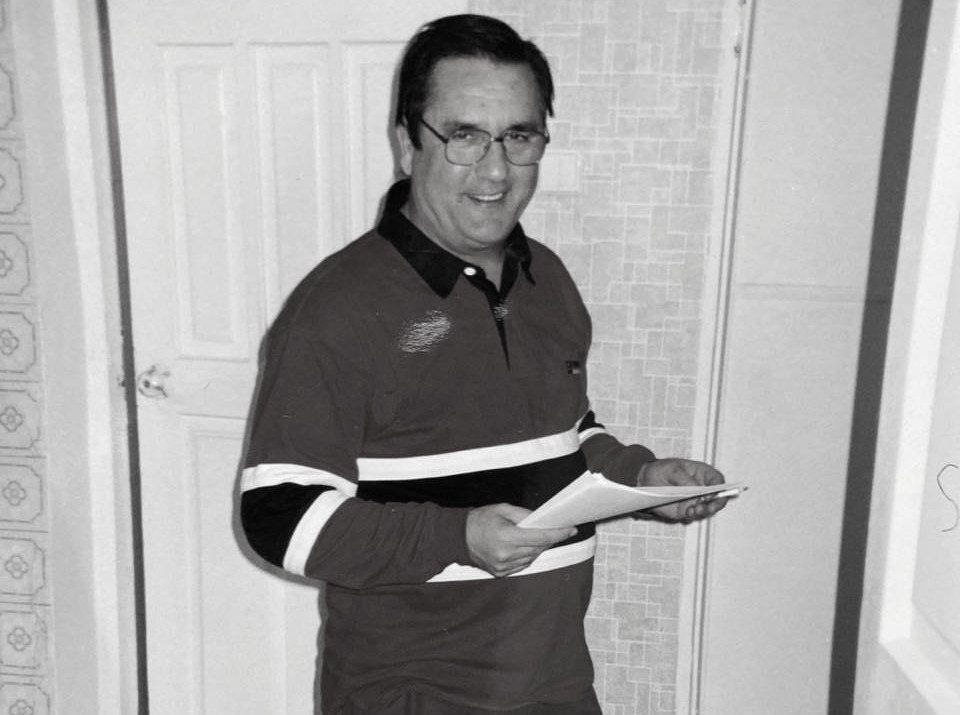
- Rustam Akramov

Personal information
- Full name: Rustam Akramovich Akramov
- Date of birth: 11 August 1948
- Place of birth: Yangibozor, Uzbek SSR, Soviet Union
- Date of death: 15 February 2022 (aged 73)
- Position: Midfielder

Senior career*
Years	Team	Apps	(Gls)
1967–1970	Politodel Tashkent		
1970–1973	Pakhtakor Tashkent		

Managerial career
- 1974–1976: CSKA Moscow (assistant)
- 1990–1991: USM Alger
- 1992: Algeria (assistant)
- 1992–1994: Uzbekistan
- 1994: Pakhtakor Tashkent
- 1995–1997: India
- * Club domestic league appearances and goals

Rustam Akramov (11 August 1948 – 15 February 2022) was an Uzbek football coach. He coached the Uzbekistan national team from 1992 to 1994 and then the India national team from 1995 to 1997.

In February 2015, while serving as technical director for Uzbekistan football, he was rebuked by the Uzbekistan Football Federation for "unsportsmanlike conduct" of his players.

== Death ==
Akramov died on 15 February 2022, at the age of 73.

== Honours ==
=== Manager ===
India

- SAFF Championship runner-up: 1995
- South Asian Games Gold medal: 1995
