= Felip Gomes =

Indian footballer

Personal information
- Full name: Felip Gomes
- Date of birth: 23 March 1978 (age 48)
- Place of birth: Goa, India
- Height: 1.78 m (5 ft 10 in)
- Position: Defender

Team information
- Current team: Churchill Brothers

Senior career*
Years	Team	Apps	(Gls)
2004–2011	Sporting Clube de Goa	129	(0)
2011–present	Churchill Brothers	0	(0)
- * Club domestic league appearances and goals

Felip Gomes (born 23 March) is an Indian football player who plays for Churchill Brothers S.C. as a defender.
