= 2017–18 Santosh Trophy =

Tournament details
- Country: India
- Teams: 10

Final positions
- Champions: Kerala (6th title)
- Runners-up: West Bengal

Tournament statistics
- Matches played: 23
- Goals scored: 86 (3.74 per match)
- Top goal scorer(s): Victorino Fernandes; Jithin MS (5 goals each)

The 2017–18 Santosh Trophy was the 72nd edition of the Santosh Trophy, the premier competition in India for teams representing their regional and state football associations. The competition began with qualifiers on 8 January 2018 and concluded with the final on 1 April 2018. Kerala won the competition, their sixth championship, by defeating West Bengal during the final in penalties 4–2.

West Bengal were the defending champions, having defeated Goa in the final during the 2016–17 season. The entire tournament took place in Kolkata.

== Qualifiers ==
The following ten teams had qualified for the 2017–18 Santosh Trophy:

- Chandigarh
- Goa
- Karnataka
- Kerala
- Maharashtra
- Manipur
- Mizoram
- Odisha
- Punjab
- West Bengal

== Group stage ==
=== Group A ===
Pos	Team	Pld	W	D	L	GF	GA	GD	Pts	Qualification
1	Kerala	4	4	0	0	15	1	+14	12	Advance to Semi-finals
2	West Bengal	4	3	0	1	9	2	+7	9	Advance to Semi-finals
3	Maharashtra	4	2	0	2	10	11	−1	6	
4	Chandigarh	4	0	1	3	3	9	−6	1	
5	Manipur	4	0	1	3	3	17	−14	1	

Rules for classification: 1) points; 2) head-to-head points; 3) head-to-head goal difference; 4) goal difference; 5) number of goals scored; 6) drawing of lots

19 March 2018	Chandigarh	1–5	Kerala	Kolkata
15:00 IST	Sharma 88'	Report	Jithin M.S. 11', 51'; Poulose 18'; Afdal V.K. 49'; Sreekuttan V.S. 77'	Stadium: Rabindra Sarobar Stadium

19 March 2018	Manipur	0–3	West Bengal	Kolkata
15:00 IST		Report	Das 7', 15'; B. Singh 82'	Stadium: Sailen Manna Stadium

21 March 2018	Chandigarh	1–1	Manipur	Kolkata
15:00 IST	Rana 65'	Report	Naocha 25'	Stadium: Rabindra Sarobar Stadium

21 March 2018	Maharashtra	1–5	West Bengal	Kolkata
15:00 IST	Dharmai 8'	Report	Chakladar 55'; Murmu 62'; B. Singh 79', 82'; Barman 90'	Stadium: Sailen Manna Stadium

23 March 2018	Maharashtra	2–1	Chandigarh	Kolkata
15:00 IST	Khanvilkar 5'; Menezes 9'	Report	Sharma 88'	Stadium: Rabindra Sarobar Stadium

23 March 2018	Kerala	6–0	Manipur	Kolkata
15:00 IST	Afdal VK 47'; Rahul KP 59'; Gopalan 62', 84'; Jithin M.S. 71'; R. Singh 90+4' (o.g.)	Report		Stadium: Sailen Manna Stadium

25 March 2018	Kerala	3–0	Maharashtra	Kolkata
15:00 IST	Raj 24'; Jithin M.S. 39'; Rahul KP 58'	Report		Stadium: Sailen Manna Stadium

25 March 2018	West Bengal	1–0	Chandigarh	Kolkata
15:00 IST	B. Singh 18'	Report		Stadium: Rabindra Sarobar Stadium

27 March 2018	West Bengal	0–1	Kerala	Kolkata
15:00 IST		Report	Rahul KP 90'	Stadium: Mohun Bagan Ground

27 March 2018	Manipur	2–7	Maharashtra	Kolkata
15:00 IST	Horam 17'; D. Singh 40'	Report	Bhokare 28'; R. Singh 59', 77', 90'; Prabhu 75'; Pandhare 86'; Ansari 90+3'	Stadium: Sailen Manna Stadium

=== Group B ===
Pos	Team	Pld	W	D	L	GF	GA	GD	Pts	Qualification
1	Karnataka	4	3	0	1	8	4	+4	9 (Note: Mizoram 0–1 Karnataka)	Advance to Semi-finals
2	Mizoram	4	3	0	1	10	3	+7	9	Advance to Semi-finals
3	Goa	4	2	0	2	12	9	+3	6	
4	Punjab	4	2	0	2	6	8	−2	6	
5	Odisha	4	0	0	4	3	15	−12	0	

Rules for classification: 1) points; 2) head-to-head points; 3) head-to-head goal difference; 4) goal difference; 5) number of goals scored; 6) drawing of lots
Notes:

20 March 2018	Odisha	1–2	Punjab	Kolkata
15:00 IST	Lakra 62'	Report	S. Singh 70'; Pradhan 82' (o.g.)	Stadium: Sailen Manna Stadium

20 March 2018	Mizoram	3–1	Goa	Kolkata
15:00 IST	F Lalrinpuia 25'; Lalromawia 81', 84'	Report	V. Fernandes 11'	Stadium: Rabindra Sarobar Stadium

22 March 2018	Karnataka	4–1	Goa	Kolkata
15:00 IST	Vignesh 54'; S. Rajesh 61'; Gonsalves 69' (o.g.); Augustine 89'	Report	Hoble 26'	Stadium: Sailen Manna Stadium

22 March 2018	Odisha	0–5	Mizoram	Kolkata
15:00 IST		Report	Zomuanpuia C 34'; Lalromawia 41', 59'; Malsawmdawngliana 73'; F Lalrinpuia 91'	Stadium: Rabindra Sarobar Stadium

24 March 2018	Punjab	1–2	Mizoram	Kolkata
15:00 IST	Rawat 56'	Report	Lalremruata 7', 9'	Stadium: Sailen Manna Stadium

24 March 2018	Karnataka	2–1	Odisha	Kolkata
15:00 IST	Augustine 27'; S. Rajesh 88'	Report	Nayak 30'	Stadium: Rabindra Sarobar Stadium

26 March 2018	Goa	6–1	Odisha	Kolkata
15:00 IST	Fernandes 15', 45', 54'; Peixote 59'; Perriera 71'; Masceranhas 85'	Report	Sardar 16'	Stadium: Rabindra Sarobar Stadium

26 March 2018	Punjab	2–1	Karnataka	Kolkata
15:00 IST	Rawat 18'; B. Singh 26'	Report	Rajesh 7'	Stadium: Sailen Manna Stadium

28 March 2018	Mizoram	0–1	Karnataka	Kolkata
15:00 IST		Report	S. Rajesh 74'	Stadium: Mohun Bagan Ground

28 March 2018	Goa	4–1	Punjab	Kolkata
15:00 IST	Peixote 25'; Fernandes 28'; Dias 59'; Perreira 67'	Report	G. Singh 90+7'	Stadium: Sailen Manna Stadium

== Knockout stage ==
Semi-finals
30 March 2018
Kerala	1
Mizoram	0
30 March 2018
Karnataka	0
West Bengal	2

Final
1 April 2018
Kerala	2 (4)
West Bengal	2 (2)

=== Semi-finals ===
30 March 2018
15:00 IST

Kerala	1–0	Mizoram
Afdal V.K. 54'	Report

Mohun Bagan Ground, Kolkata

30 March 2018
15:00 IST

Karnataka	0–2	West Bengal
	Report	Murmu 57'; Sarkar 90+2'

Sailen Manna Stadium, Kolkata

=== Final ===
1 April 2018
15:00 IST

Kerala	2–2 (a.e.t.)	West Bengal
Jithin M.S. 19'; Thomas 117'	Report	Murmu 68'; Sarkar 120+2'
Penalties
Rahul (penalty scored); Jithin (penalty scored); Jestin (penalty scored); Seassan (penalty scored)	4–2	(penalty missed) Ankit; (penalty missed) Nabi; (penalty scored) Sarkar; (penalty scored) Sanchayan

Salt Lake Stadium, Kolkata
Attendance: 5,500

== Goalscorers ==
5 goals

- Jithin MS (Kerala)
- Victorino Fernandes (Goa)

4 goals

- S. Rajesh (Karnataka)
- Lalromawia (Mizoram)
- Bidyashagar Singh (West Bengal)

3 goals

- Rahul KP (Kerala)
- Afdal VK (Kerala)
- Ranjeet Singh (Maharashtra)
- Jiten Murmu (West Bengal)

2 goals

- Vishal Sharma (Chandigarh)
- Mackroy Peixote (Goa)
- Shubert Jonas Perriera (Goa)
- Leon Augustine (Karnataka)
- Jithin Gopalan (Kerala)
- F Lalrinpuia (Mizoram)
- Lalremruata (Mizoram)
- Jitender Rawat (Punjab)
- Sumit Das (West Bengal)
- Tirthankar Sarkar (West Bengal)

1 goal

- Vivek Rana (Chandigarh)
- Kapil Hoble (Goa)
- Marcus Masceranhas (Goa)
- Nestor Dias (Goa)
- Gunashekar Vignesh (Karnataka)
- Sajith Poulose (Kerala)
- Sreekuttan V.S. (Kerala)
- Rahul Raj (Kerala)
- Vibin Thomas (Kerala)
- Leander Dharmai (Maharashtra)
- Shubham Khanvilkar (Maharashtra)
- Dion Menezes (Maharashtra)
- Sahil Bhokare (Maharashtra)
- Nikhil Prabhu (Maharashtra)
- Kiran Pandhare (Maharashtra)
- Naqiur Ansari (Maharashtra)
- Ngangbam Naocha (Manipur)
- Chanso Horam (Manipur)
- Dhananjoy Singh (Manipur)
- Zomuanpuia C (Mizoram)
- Malsawmdawngliana (Mizoram)
- Arpan Lakra (Odisha)
- Arjun Nayak (Odisha)
- Sunil Sardar (Odisha)
- Sarbjit Singh (Punjab)
- Baltej Singh (Punjab)
- Gurtej Singh (Punjab)
- Manotosh Chakladar (West Bengal)
- Rajon Barman (West Bengal)

Own goals

- Matthew Gonsalves (Goa)
- Roshan Singh (Manipur)
- Rudra Pradhan (Odisha)
