= 2018 Santosh Trophy final =

- Event: 2017–18 Santosh Trophy
Kerala	West Bengal
2	2
- After extra time Kerala won 4–2 on penalties
- Date: 1 April 2018
- Venue: Salt Lake Stadium, Kolkata, West Bengal

The 2018 Santosh Trophy final was a match between Kerala and West Bengal, played on 1 April 2018, at the Salt Lake Stadium in Kolkata, West Bengal. The match was a culmination of the 2017–18 Santosh Trophy, the 72nd edition of the football competition contested by regional state associations and government institutions under the All India Football Federation. Kerala won the match after defeating West Bengal in a penalty shootout 4–2. In regulation time, the match ended 1–1 while during extra time, a goal each found both sides tied 2–2 after 120 minutes.

Kerala entered this edition of the Santosh Trophy after qualifying from Group B of the South Zone qualifiers. West Bengal entered after qualifying from Group B of the East Zone qualifiers. Prior to the start of the competition proper, both Kerala and West Bengal were placed in Group A for the first round. Both sides faced each other in the final match of the round, both winning their previous three matches. Kerala came away as the 1–0 winners to win the group.

West Bengal entered the match as the defending champions after winning the Santosh Trophy the previous year in 2017.

== Road to the final ==
The Santosh Trophy is an association football knock-out competition contested by the regional state associations and government institutions under the All India Football Federation (AIFF), the sport's governing body in India. Started in 1941, the competition was considered the top domestic football championship in India, prior to the start of the National Football League in 1996. The 2017–18 competition is the 72nd edition of the Santosh Trophy.

In order to enter the competition proper, teams had to go through a qualification round based on their region. Kerala were placed in Group B of the South Zone qualifiers while West Bengal were placed in Group B of the East Zone qualifiers. Kerala topped their group consisting of Andhra Pradesh and Tamil Nadu to qualify. West Bengal would also top their group consisting of Chhattisgarh and Jharkhand.

=== Kerala ===
Prior to reaching the 2018 final, Kerala had played the final of the Santosh Trophy 13 times, winning on five occasions, most recently in 2004. For this edition of the tournament, Kerala were placed in Group A with Chandigarh, Maharashtra, Manipur, and eventually final opponent West Bengal.

Kerala's first match of the competition occurred on 19 March against Chandigarh. A brace from Jithin M.S. and three goals from Sajith Poulose, Afdal V.K. and Sreekuttan V.S. respectively earned Kerala an opening 5–1 victory. Four days later, Kerala defeated Manipur 6–0. Jithin Gopalan scored a brace while Afdal V.K., Rahul K.P., and Jithin M.S. scored the other three goals. The sixth goal came from an own goal by Roshan Singh. Two days later, on 25 March, Kerala would earn another major victory, 3–0 over Maharashtra. Rahul Raj opened the scoring in the 24th minute before Jithin M.S. scored his fourth goal of the tournament in the 39th. Rahul K.P. scored Kerala's third in the 58th minute. Finally, on 27 March, Kerala played their final match of the group stage against eventually final opponent West Bengal. Rahul K.P. scored his third goal of the tournament in the 90th minute to give Kerala the victory and top of the group.

With the group stage finished, Kerala would take on Mizoram in the knockout semi-final match at the Mohun Bagan Ground. An Afdal V.K. goal in the 54th minute was enough to give Kerala the victory and a spot in their 14th final.

=== West Bengal ===
West Bengal is entering this final as the most winningest team in competition history, winning the competition 32 times, including the final from the previous year. As well as their 32 championships, West Bengal were runners-up in the tournament 12 times. The second most winningest side in the competition is Punjab, with eight championships.

For this edition of the Santosh Trophy, West Bengal were placed in Group A alongside Chandigarh, Maharashtra, Manipur, and their finals opponent, Kerala. Their match was against Manipur on 19 March at the Sailen Manna Stadium. A Sumit Das brace and a goal from Bidyasagar Singh gave West Bengal a comfortable 3–0 opening victory. Two days later, West Bengal took on Maharashtra and won 5–1. Maharashtra took the lead early in the 8th minute through Leander Dharmai. West Bengal came back in the second half and equalized through Manotosh Chakladar in the 55th minute. Jiten Mumru then gave West Bengal the lead in the 62nd minute before Bidyashagar Singh scored their third in the 79th minute. The scoring was rounded off by a Bidyashagar Singh goal for a brace and Rajon Barman.

Then, on 25 March, Bidyashagar Singh scored his third goal of the tournament as West Bengal defeated Chandigarh 1–0. Despite the victory, West Bengal head coach, Ranjan Chowdhury, was displeased with his team's performance: "I’m not at all happy with the team’s performance. We probably played the worst match of the tournament today." Two days later, West Bengal succumbed to their first defeat of the tournament, a 1–0 defeat against their finals opponent Kerala.

After the group stage, with West Bengal finishing second in Group A, the side were to play Group B winners Karnataka on 30 March. During the match, West Bengal captain Jiten Murmu opened the scoring in the 57th minute before Tirthankar Sarkar secured the victory for West Bengal in the 92nd minute and sent his side to their 45th final.

== Pre-match ==
=== Host selection ===
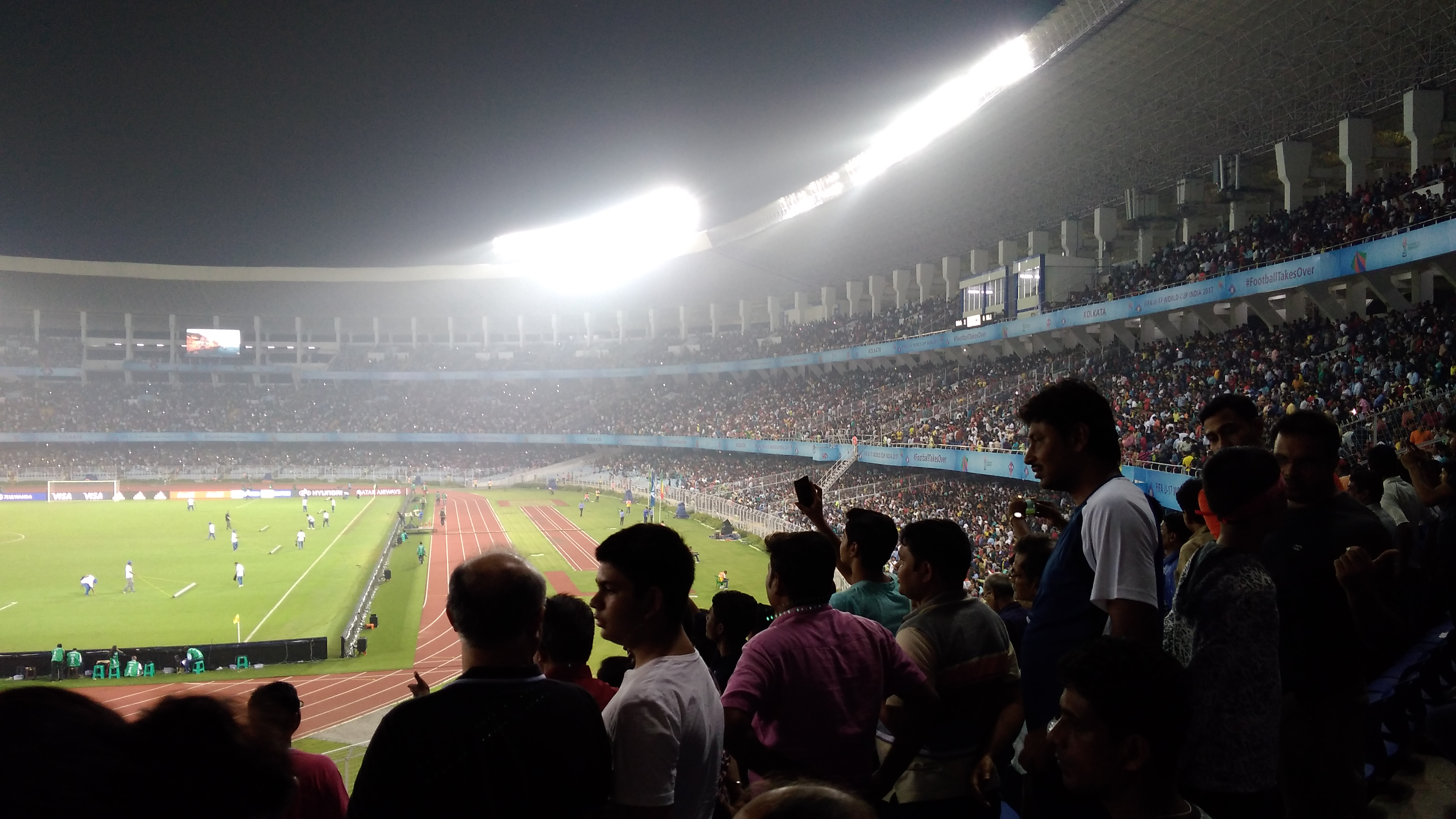
Salt Lake Stadium in Kolkata

On 21 February 2018, it was announced by the All India Football Federation that the Santosh Trophy would take place in Kolkata. Prior to the beginning of the tournament, Kushal Das, the AIFF's General Secretary, said that he was looking forward to the Indian Football Association (West Bengal's state football federation) successfully hosting the competition.

Before the final, during the tournament, three different stadiums were used in and around Kolkata. The Rabindra Sarobar Stadium and the Sailen Manna Stadium were extensively used throughout the group stage before the Mohun Bagan Ground hosted some matches towards the end of the group stage and during the semi-finals. For the final of the competition, the match will be played at the Salt Lake Stadium.

=== Analysis ===
Despite taking the victory in their prior match during the group stage, Kerala will not come into this match as favorites. Due to being hosts in the final and history, West Bengal are favorites. Previously, both Kerala and West Bengal have met in the final of the Santosh Trophy twice, back in 1989 and 1994. On both occasions, West Bengal came out as the winners in penalty shootouts. However, even with history not on Kerala's side, their head coach, Satheevan Balan, was optimistic before the final: "We know the statistics. But that is not something we are concerned about. Stats have been against us since the start of the tournament. We were not fancied when we started the campaign and many doubted us to even make it past the qualifiers. But now we are in the final. We have considered every game as a final since arriving here and on Sunday, it will be the same."

For West Bengal, the hosts will be looking to reverse their defeat to Kerala from the group stage. "There is no pressure. The team has confidence in its ability to win the final,” said Bengal head coach Ranjan Chowdhury. “They are organised and strong defensively. Whoever wins needs to earn the trophy by playing well." West Bengal will also enter the match still as reigning champions, after they won in the final the previous season against Goa 1–0. For Kerala, this will be their first final appearance since 2013 and their first attempt to win the trophy since 2004. "We can create history as it was 14 years ago that Kerala last won the prestigious trophy, but we will play without pressure," said head coach, Satheevan Balan.

Coming into the match, West Bengal had the league's best defense, only conceding twice throughout the tournament while Kerala have scored the most goals during the competition.

== Match ==
1 April 2018
15:00 IST

Kerala	2–2 (a.e.t.)	West Bengal
Gopalan 19'; Thomas 117'	Report	Murmu 68'; Sarkar 120+2'
Penalties
Rahul (penalty scored); Jithin (penalty scored); Jestin (penalty scored); Seassan (penalty scored)	4–2	(penalty missed) Ankit; (penalty missed) Nabi; (penalty scored) Sarkar; (penalty scored) Sanchayan

Salt Lake Stadium, Kolkata
Attendance: 5,500
