= Liston Colaço =

Indian footballer (born 1998)

Personal information
- Full name: Liston Colaço
- Date of birth: 12 November 1998 (age 27)
- Place of birth: Davorlim, Goa, India
- Height: 1.78 m (5 ft 10 in)
- Position: Forward

Team information
- Current team: Mohun Bagan
- Number: 7

Youth career
- 2013–2017: Salgaocar

Senior career*
Years	Team	Apps	(Gls)
2016–2017	Salgaocar B	8	(11)
2016–2017	Salgaocar	20	(13)
2017–2019	Goa B	9	(6)
2017–2020	Goa	8	(0)
2020–2021	Hyderabad B	3	(0)
2020–2021	Hyderabad	23	(4)
2021–	Mohun Bagan	101	(17)

International career^{‡}
2021–	India	34	(1)
Medal record
Men's football
Representing India
SAFF Championship
Winner	2021 Maldives
Winner	2023 India
- * Club domestic league appearances and goals as of 21:00, 12 June 2025 (UTC) ‡ National team caps and goals as of 21:00, 31 March 2026 (UTC)

Liston Colaço (born 12 November 1998) is an Indian professional footballer who plays as a forward for Indian Super League club Mohun Bagan and the India national team.

== Club career ==
Born in Davorlim, Goa, Colaço is a product of Salgaocar. He was the top scorer with the club's under-19 side during the 2016–17 I-League U18 with 16 goals. Colaço also played for Salgaocar's first team during the 2016–17 Goa Professional League, becoming top scorer during that tournament with 13 goals.

In March 2017, it was announced that Colaço had been selected into Goa's final squad for the 2016–17 Santosh Trophy. He began the tournament with a goal in Goa's first match against Meghalaya. Colaço scored in the 52nd minute as Goa won 2–1. He then scored a brace for Goa in the semi-finals against Kerala on 23 March 2017 which sent Goa to the final.

=== Goa ===
After his performances for Salgaocar and the Goa football team in the Santosh Trophy, Colaço joined Indian Super League side Goa for a reported 15 lakh. In October 2017, after impressing for FC Goa Development team, Colaço, along with Manvir Singh, was called up to the first team.

On 19 November 2017, Colaço made his professional debut for Goa in their opening Indian Super League match against Chennaiyin. He came on as a 79th-minute substitute for Brandon Fernandes as Goa won 3–2.

=== Hyderabad ===
On 14 January 2020, Liston joined Indian Super league side Hyderabad on a two and half year deal. On 30 January 2020, Liston made his debut for Hyderabad against Bengaluru. He came on as a 71st-minute substitute for Asish Rai as the match ended in a 1–0 victory for Bengaluru. He ended up the season by scoring four goals for the club.

=== Mohun Bagan ===
On 10 April 2021, it was officially announced that Mohun Bagan Super Giant and Hyderabad FC have agreed on the transfer of Liston Colaco, which involves an undisclosed transfer fee around ₹1 crores. This move set a new record in Indian football for the highest transfer fee for an Indian player, breaking the previous record of transfer of Manvir Singh from FC Goa to Mohun Bagan Super Giant for ₹80 lakhs.

Colaco scored his first goal for the club on 21 August against Maziya S&RC at the 2021 AFC Cup. He debuted for Mohun Bagan in the 2021–22 season opener against Kerala Blasters on 19 November, where he scored a goal in 4–2 win. His goal in MBSG's 2–1 victory over FC Goa on 29 December is recorded as one of the fastest shots in the history of the game with 181 km/h, taking the sixth spot previously held by former England national football team captain David Beckham. He had an excellent season recording 8 goals, the most by a domestic player, along with 3 assists. He was one of the standout performers of the season.

On 21 May 2022, Colaco scored a hat-trick in their 4–0 win against Bangladeshi side Bashundhara Kings at the second group-stage match of 2022 AFC Cup. He finished the tournament with four goals.

== International career ==
In March 2021, Liston was included in the 35-member list of probables for the Indian national team's international friendlies against Oman and UAE. He made his national team debut against UAE on 29 March. On 19 March 2025, he scored his first goal for India by a header against Maldives, in which India won by 3–0, ending their 489 days winless run. Colaco has been criticised for his performance in the Indian national team due to his lack of goals and poor finishing.

== Personal life ==
Colaço has been in a relationship with Goan air-hostess Bryna Dsouza. They got married on 12 December 2025.

== Career statistics ==
=== Club ===
As of match played 5 November 2026

Appearances and goals by club, season and competition
Club	Season	League			National cup (Note: Includes Super Cup)		AFC		Durand Cup		Other		Total	
Club	Season	Division	Apps	Goals	Apps	Goals	Apps	Goals	Apps	Goals	Apps	Goals	Apps	Goals
Salgaocar B	2014–15	GFA Third Division	3	5	—		—		—		—		3	5
Salgaocar B	2015–16	—			—		—		—		3 (Note: Appearances in Bandodkar Gold Trophy)	4	3	4
Salgaocar B	2016–17	GFA First Division	8	11	—		—		—		—		8	11
Salgaocar B	Total		11	16	—						3	4	14	20
Salgaocar	2016–17	Goa Professional League	20	13	—						4 (Note: Three appearances and one goal in Goa Police Cup, one appearance GFA Charity Cup)	1	24	14
Salgaocar	Total		20	13	—						4	1	24	14
Goa B	2017–18	I-League 2nd Division	8	3	—						10 (Note: Eight appearances and seven goals in Goa Professional League, two appearances and one goal in AWES Cup)	8	18	11
Goa B	2018–19	I-League 2nd Division	1	3	—						12 (Note: Appearances in Goa Professional League)	6	13	9
Goa B	2019–20	I-League 2nd Division	—								3 (Note: One appearance in GFA Charity Cup, two appearances in Goa Professional League)	0	3	0
Goa B	Total		9	6	0	0	0	0	0	0	25	14	34	20
Goa	2017–18	Indian Super League	4	0	2	0	—		—		—		6	0
Goa	2018–19	Indian Super League	1	0	4	0	—		—		—		5	0
Goa	2019–20	Indian Super League	3	0	0	0	—		3 (Note: Appearances in Durand Cup)	2	—		6	2
Goa	Total		8	0	6	0	0	0	3	2	0	0	17	2
Hyderabad B	2019–20	I-League 2nd Division	3	0	—								3	0
Hyderabad	2019–20	Indian Super League	4	2	—		—		—		—		4	2
Hyderabad	2020–21	Indian Super League	19	2	—		—		—		—		19	2
Hyderabad	Total		26	4	0	0	0	0	0	0	0	0	26	4
Mohun Bagan	2021–22	Indian Super League	22	8	0	0	4 (Note: 2021 AFCCup)	1	—				26	9
Mohun Bagan	2022–23	Indian Super League	24	1	3	2	5 (Note: 2022 AFCCup)	4	3	1	1 (Note: One appearance in Indian club qualifiers for 2023–24 AFC competitions)	0	36	8
Mohun Bagan	2023–24	Indian Super League	19	4	0	0	7 (Note: 2023-24 AFC Cup)	2	6	1	0	0	32	7
Mohun Bagan	2024–25	Indian Super League	27	3	0	0	1 (Note: Appearance(s) in ACL Two)	0	4	1	0	0	32	4
Mohun Bagan	2025–26	Indian Super League	13	1	2	0	1	0	4	5	1 (Note: Appearance(s) in IFA Shield)	0	21	6
Mohun Bagan	2026–27	Indian Super League	5	0	0	0	—		6	0	6 (Note: 2 Appearance(s) in Calcutta Football League and 4 Appearance(s) in 2026 IFA Shield)	0	17	0
Mohun Bagan	Total		110	17	5	2	18	7	23	8	8	0	164	34
Career total			184	56	11	2	18	7	26	10	40	19	279	94

=== International ===
As of 31 March 2026

National team	Year	Apps	Goals
India	2021	8	0
India	2022	6	0
India	2023	4	0
India	2024	9	0
India	2025	6	1
India	2026	1	0
Total		34	1

List of international goals scored by Liston Colaço
No.	Date	Venue	Opponent	Score	Result	Competition
1.	20 March 2025	Jawaharlal Nehru Stadium, Shillong, India	Maldives	2–0	3–0	Friendly

== Honours ==
Salgaocar B

- GFA First Division: 2016–17

Salgaocar

- Goa Professional League: 2016–17

FC Goa

- Super Cup: 2019

Mohun Bagan

- Durand Cup: 2023
- Indian Super League Cup: 2022–23, 2024–25
- IFA Shield: 2025, 2026
- Indian Super League Shield: 2023–24, 2024–25
- Calcutta Football League: 2026

India

- SAFF Championship: 2021
- Intercontinental Cup: 2023

Individual

- FPAI Indian Player of the Year: 2021–22
- Mohun Bagan Footballer of the year: 2022
