= Óscar Bruzón =

Spanish manager and former footballer

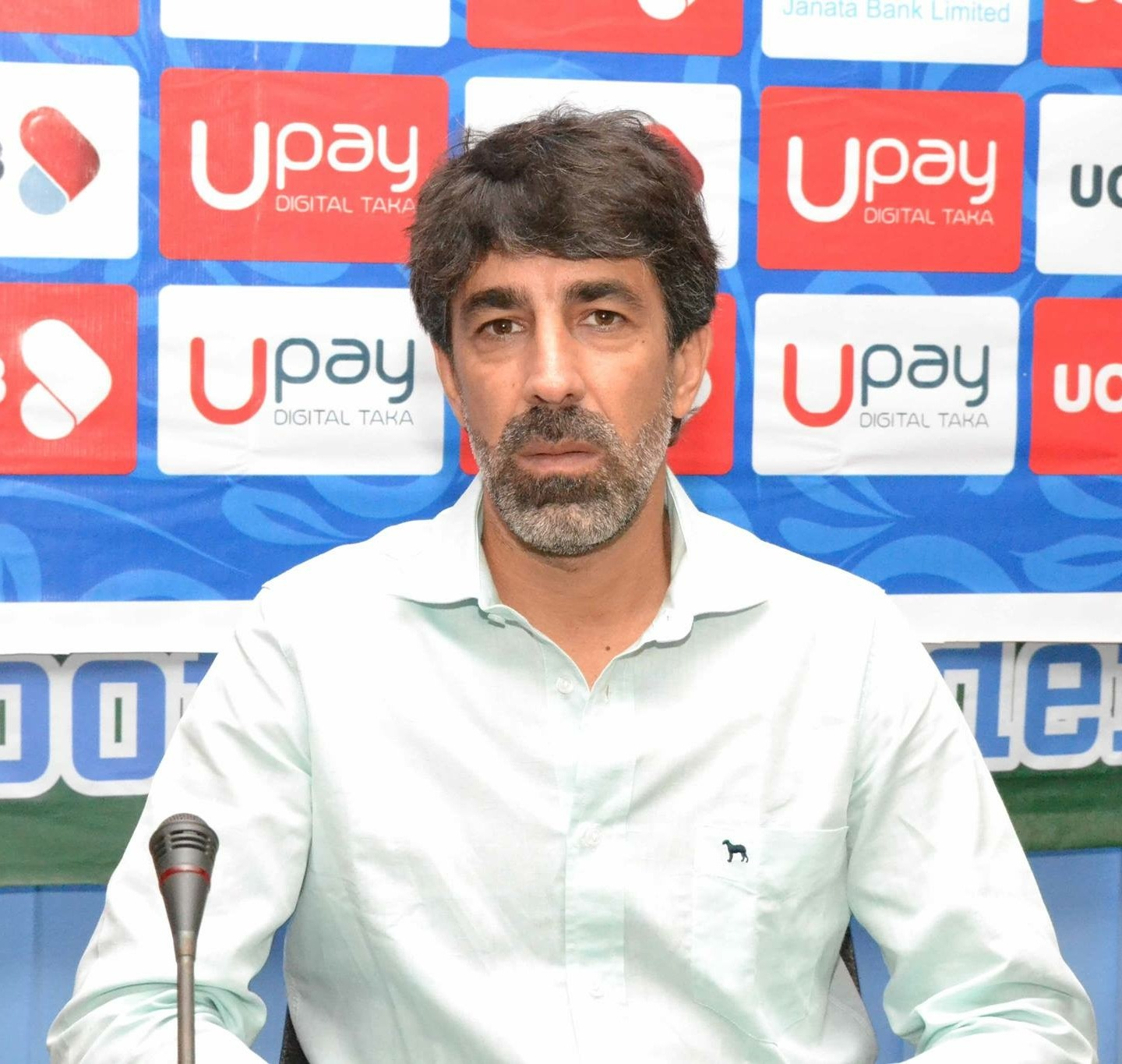
- Bruzón during a press conference in 2018

Personal information
- Full name: Óscar Bruzón Barreras
- Date of birth: 29 May 1977 (age 49)
- Place of birth: Vigo, Galicia, Spain
- Height: 1.78 m (5 ft 10 in)
- Positions: Defensive midfielder; winger

Team information
- Current team: Bhayangkara Presisi (head coach)

Youth career
- Colegio Apóstol
- –1997: Areosa

Senior career*
Years	Team	Apps	(Gls)
1997–1998	Gran Peña	38	(2)
1998–2001	Celta B	30	(2)
1999–2001	→ Universidad Las Palmas (loan)	32	(6)
2001–2003	Pontevedra	38	(2)
Total		138	(12)

Managerial career
- 2012–2014: Sporting Goa
- 2017–2018: Mumbai
- 2018–2019: New Radiant
- 2019–2024: Bashundhara Kings
- 2021–2022: Bangladesh (interim)
- 2024–2026: East Bengal
- 2026–: Bhayangkara Presisi
- * Club domestic league appearances and goals

Óscar Bruzón Barreras (born 29 May 1977) is a Spanish professional football manager and former player who played as either a winger or a defensive midfielder. He is the head coach of Super League club Bhayangkara Presisi.

== Playing career ==
Bruzón was born in Vigo, Galicia. A Colegio Apóstol alumni, he moved to Areosa before joining Tercera División side Gran Peña. After finishing his first and only campaign as a starter, he moved to Celta Vigo and was assigned to the reserves also in the fourth division.

In the summer of 1999, after only representing the first-team in friendlies, Bruzón was loaned to Segunda División B side Universidad Las Palmas, achieving promotion to Segunda División at the end of the 1999–2000 season. He made his professional debut on 3 September 2000, starting in a 0–0 away draw against Sporting Gijón, but injuries limited his contributions during the 2000–01 season to just two appearances.

On 6 July 2001, Bruzón signed a two-year deal with Pontevedra in the third division. After being an ever-present figure during his first season, he again struggled with injuries in his second, and subsequently retired in 2003.

== Managerial career ==
Bruzon started his managerial career in 2007, with Areosa's youth setup. In 2009, he joined Celta's youth setup, while working part-time in a bank.

On 4 December 2012, Bruzón replaced Ekendra Singh at the helm of Sporting Goa. He won the Goa Professional League during the 2013–14 season, while also achieving mid-table positions with the club in the I-League. On 4 December 2014, he left the club.

On 15 April 2015, it was announced that Bruzón had signed with Indian Super League side Mumbai City as an assistant coach. In October of the following year, he was named Fernando Vázquez's assistant at Mallorca.

On 22 March 2017, Bruzón returned to India and took over Mumbai. On 26 June, he was named in charge of New Radiant in the Maldives, winning the Dhivehi Premier League, the Maldives FA Cup and the President's Cup during his first season.

On 21 August 2018, Bruzón switched teams and countries again after being appointed manager of Bashundhara Kings. He helped his team win all domestic tournaments and qualify for the 2019 AFC Cup in his first season in charge.

He was appointed as the interim head coach of the Bangladesh national team for the 2021 SAFF Championship.

In the 2025–26 season, Bruzón led East Bengal to the Indian Super League title, marking a major achievement in the club's history. Following the triumph, Bruzón described winning the ISL with East Bengal as the peak of his coaching career. He left East Bengal in May 2026.

== Club statistics ==
Club	Season	League			Cup		Continental		Other		Total	
Club	Season	Division	Apps	Goals	Apps	Goals	Apps	Goals	Apps	Goals	Apps	Goals
Universidad LP	1999-2000	Segunda División B	30	5	1	0	—		6	0	36	5
Universidad LP	2000-01	Segunda División	2	0	0	0	—		—		2	0
Universidad LP	Total		32	5	1	0	—		6	0	38	5
Pontevedra	2001-02	Segunda División B	31	1	0	0	—		6	0	37	1
Pontevedra	2002-03	Segunda División B	7	1	1	0	—		—		8	1
Pontevedra	Total		38	2	1	0	—		6	0	45	2
Career total			70	7	2	0	—		12	0	84	7

== Honours ==
=== Manager ===
Sporting Clube de Goa

- Goa Professional League: 2013–14

New Radiant

- Dhivehi Premier League: 2017
- Maldives FA Cup: 2017
- President's Cup: 2017
- Maldivian FA Charity Shield: 2018

Bashundhara Kings

- Bangladesh Premier League: 2018–19, 2021, 2021-22, 2022–23
- Federation Cup: 2019–20, 2020–21
- Independence Cup: 2018

East Bengal FC

- Indian Super League: 2025–27

=== Individual ===
- Maldives Football Awards Best Men's Coach: 2016–17
- Bangladesh Football Awards Best Men's Coach: 2018–19
