= 2017 Santosh Trophy final =

- Event: 2016–17 Santosh Trophy
Goa	West Bengal
0	1
- After extra time
- Date: 27 March 2017
- Venue: GMC Stadium, Bambolim
- Attendance: ≈5,000

The 2017 Santosh Trophy final was the 71st final of Santosh Trophy, the football competition contested by regional State associations and government institutions under the All India Football Federation. It was contested between Goa and West Bengal on 26 March 2017 at the GMC Stadium in Bambolim. Bengal beat Goa 1–0 in extra time, with the only goal being scored by Manvir Singh.

== Background ==
West Bengal went into the final with a record of 31 wins from 41 Santosh Trophy finals and Goa with five out of eleven, with the two teams sharing the trophy in 1982–83. They met six time previously in the final, and Bengal had won five. Goa, however, won their last meeting, in 2008–09. Bengal had defeated Goa the last time the latter hosted the competition, in 1995–96.

== Details ==
26 March 2017
18:00 IST

Goa	0–1 (a.e.t.)	West Bengal
	Report	Manvir Singh 119'

GMC Stadium, Bambolim
Attendance: ≈5,000

Goa	West Bengal

GK	30	Bruno Colaço
DF	4	Melvin Lobo	(yellow card) 101'
MF	17	Glan Martins		(substituted off) 117'
	13	Assumption Soares
DF	14	Nicolau Colaco		(substituted off) 71'
MF	6	Peter Carvalho (c)
MF	15	Cajetan Fernandes
	16	Leander D'Cunha
MF	17	Brian Mascarenhas
CF	10	Liston Colaco
FW	11	Aaren D'Silva		(substituted off) 63'
Substitutes:
GK	1	Melroy Fernandes		(substituted on) 117'
	2	George D'Souza		(substituted on) 71'
DF	3	Lenny Pereira
FW	7	Marcus Masceranhas
	8	Akeraj Martins		(substituted on) 63'
	12	Francis Fernandes
DF	20	Jessel Carneiro
GK	22	Agnelo Gomes
Coach:
Mateus Costa

GK	1	Shankar Roy
DF	4	Provat Lakra
DF	13	Samad Ali Mallick
DF	16	Rana Gharami (c)	(yellow card) 55'
DF	18	Santu Singh
MF	11	Bishal Pradhan		(substituted off) 81'
MF	22	Mumtaz Akhtar
	23	Shaikhom Singh
	24	Basanta Singh	(yellow card) 24'
CF	20	Manvir Singh
FW	10	SK. Faiaz
Substitutes:
GK	21	Ranjit Majumdar
GK	31	Ankur Das
DF	19	Ankit Mukherjee
DF	2	Suman Hazra
DF	3	Sourav Dasgupta
MF	5	Debasis Pradhan		(substituted on) 81'	(substituted off) 113'
MF	6	Sannik Murmu		(substituted on) 113'	(substituted off) 120+1'
MF	14	Monotosh Chakladar		(substituted on) 120+1'
MF	15	Prohlad Roy
Coach:
Mridul Banerjee

=== Statistics ===
Overall	Goa	West Bengal
Goals scored	0	1
Total shots	12	15
Shots on target	3	8
Ball possession	48%	52%
Corner kicks	3	7
Fouls committed	15	15
Offsides	1	7
Yellow cards	1	2
Red cards	0	0
