= Rahman Syed =

Pakistani entomologist, professor, and actor

Datuk Rahman Anwar Syed
- Born: 14 December 1932; Alawalpur, Punjab, British India Present-day India
- Died: 20 June 2009 (aged 76); Islamabad, Pakistan
- Education: University of the Punjab; Forman Christian College
- Known for: Discovery of the biological method of oil palm pollination
- Scientific career
- Fields: Entomology
- Workplaces: Gordon College, Rawalpindi; Commonwealth Institute of Biological Control (CIBI)

Datuk Rahman Anwar Syed (14 December 1932 – 20 June 2009) was a Pakistani entomologist, professor, actor, and entrepreneur, best known for his discovery of the biological method of oil palm pollination.

== Early life ==
Rahman Anwar Syed was born into a Muslim family of the village of Alawalpur, Punjab, British India, the eldest of seven children. His father, Major Dr. Abdul Majeed, was a doctor in the British Indian Army and a renowned malariologist. Given Dr. Majeed's frequent absence from home due to the demanding nature of his work, Syed became independent at an early age. The untimely loss of his mother added to the hardships of his childhood.

Syed received his primary education at a local village school, sitting upon dirt mats outdoors in searing heat. It was after the harrowing 1947 Partition of India, when his family made the dangerous journey to the Pakistani city of Karachi, that Syed began to show his promise. There he gained admission to the renowned Dayaram Jethamal Science College, joining its University Officers Training Course and achieving success academically. Syed moved on to Lahore's prestigious Forman Christian College, where he developed a lasting interested in physical science and zoology.

Syed was an avid sportsman, captaining Forman Christian College's football team and playing racquet sports. Throughout life he was a passionate fan of cricket.

In the latter stages of his youth, Syed delved into acting, playing a lead role in the Pakistan Television drama, Lagan Apni Apni.

== Further education and career ==
Rahman Anwar Syed's first job, in 1962, was one teaching zoology at Gordon College, Rawalpindi, a post he held for six years. In 1968 he joined the Commonwealth Institute of Biological Control and became involved in entomological research. His initial work with the institute involved the biological control of fruit flies, an endeavor especially important to Pakistan's agricultural sector. At this time he completed his formal education, being awarded a PhD from the University of Punjab in Lahore.

== Oil palm pollination research and discovery ==
After his doctoral studies, Syed was posted by the Commonwealth Institute of Biological Control to Sabah, Malaysia, where he gained a measure of notoriety for his work that led to the doing away of certain insecticides through the use of a virus to control palm leaf-eating nettle caterpillars. Leslie Davidson, then Chairman of Unilever oil palm plantations in Malaysia, hired Syed to investigate a hunch he had on the possibility of oil palm pollination being doable by insects rather than, as conventional wisdom had it, solely by wind or by hand. Syed's field and laboratory research in Cameroon yielded the conclusive discovery of the most efficient pollinator of the oil palm, the weevil species Elaeidobious kamerunicus. In 1979 he published his findings in the Bulletin of Entomological Research. The newly recognized African oil palm weevil, E. kamerunicus, was approved for importation and brought to the plantations of Malaysia in 1981. Its release was a great success, dramatically improving palm oil production, ending the costly and time-consuming practice of hand-pollination, and speeding plantation expansion, all with little to no negative biological impact.

== Later life and legacy ==
For his contribution to the Sabah and Malaysia's economic and social wellbeing, the Malaysian state of Sabah bestowed upon Rahman Anwar Syed the honorary title of Datuk. In its first post-release year alone, E. kamerunicus was calculated to have increased Malaysian oil palm production by approximately US$370 million. The weevil has since been employed as chief pollinator of oil palms in all other parts of the world where it did not already exist, and its economic impact has continued to build exponentially over the years.

Syed fathered four sons by his wife of fifty-one years. He remained active in entomology consulting and in business until his death, founding, owning, and chairing Nourbiz Pvt. Ltd., a Pakistani snack food company responsible for the well-known Korneez brand. He died at his home in Islamabad after a long battle with colorectal cancer.
