= 2015–16 Goa Professional League =

Goa Professional League
- Season: 2015–16
- Champions: Sporting Goa; 3rd GPL title 3rd Goan title
- Relegated: Curtorim Gymkhana
- Matches played: 90
- Goals scored: 254 (2.82 per match)
- Top goalscorer: (Nigeria) Odafe Onyeka Okolie (11 Goals)
- Biggest home win: Salgaocar 7–0 Curtorim Gymkhana (31 October 2015)
- Biggest away win: Curtorim Gymkhana 0–9 Churchill Brothers (27 December 2015)
- Highest scoring: Curtorim Gymkhana 0–9 Churchill Brothers (27 December 2015)

The 2015–16 Goa Professional League is the 18th season of top-tier football in the Indian state of Goa. It began on 23 August 2015. Salgaocar F.C. are the defending champions.

== Teams ==
Team	City/Town
Calangute Association	Calangute
Churchill Brothers	Salcete
Curtorim Gymkhana	Curtorim
Dempo	Panaji
Guardian Angel SC	Curchorem
Laxmi Prasad	Mapusa
Salgaocar	Vasco da Gama
Santa Cruz Club of Cavelossim	Cavelossim
Sporting Clube de Goa	Panaji
Vasco S.C.	Vasco

== Table ==
Pos	Team	Pld	W	D	L	GF	GA	GD	Pts	Qualification or relegation
1	Sporting Goa (C)	18	12	3	3	37	19	+18	39	Champions
2	Churchill Brothers	18	8	7	3	35	11	+24	31	
3	Salgaocar	18	7	8	3	29	14	+15	29	
4	Calangute Association	18	6	10	2	21	14	+7	28	
5	Dempo	18	7	6	5	26	18	+8	27	
6	Santa Cruz	18	8	3	7	31	31	0	27	
7	Laxmi Prasad	18	5	7	6	30	24	+6	22	
8	Vasco	18	4	9	5	21	21	0	21	
9	Guardian Angel	18	5	2	11	17	30	−13	17	
10	Curtorim Gymkhana (R)	18	0	1	17	7	72	−65	1	Relegation to 2016 Goa 1st Division

Source: Goa Football Association
Rules for classification: 1) points; 2) goal difference; 3) number of goals scored.
(C) Champions; (R) Relegated

=== Top scorers ===
As of 7 January 2016

Rank	Player	Club	Goals
1	(Nigeria) Odafe Onyeka Okolie	Sporting Goa	11
2	(Nigeria) Felix Chidi Odili	Calangute Association	9
3	(Nigeria) Chinedu Egioju Emmanuel	Vasco	7
3	(India) Gilbert Oliveira	Salgaocar	7
4	(India) Agnelo D'Souza	Vasco	6
4	(India) Marcus Masceranhas	Sporting Goa	6
5	(India) Nicholas Fernandes	Churchill Brothers	5
5	(India) Ganesh Thakur	Sporting Goa	5
5	(India) Melvin Fernandes	Santa Cruz	5
5	(Nigeria) David Opara	Laxmi Prasad	5
5	(Nigeria) Francis Onyeamna	Laxmi Prasad	5
5	(India) Aslon Oliveira	Salgaocar	5
