= Duhra =

Duhre
- Village
- Location in Punjab, India Duhre (India)
- Coordinates: 31.4591929°N 75.6706452°E
- Country: India
- State: Punjab
- District: Jalandhar

Government
  - Type: Panchayat raj
  - Body: Gram panchayat
- Elevation: 240 m (790 ft)

Languages
  - Official: Punjabi
- Time zone: UTC+5:30 (IST)
- ISO 3166 code: IN-PB
- Website: jalandhar.nic.in

Duhre is a village in Jalandhar district of Punjab State, India. It is located 24 kilometres (15 mi) from district headquarter Jalandhar and 166 kilometres (103 mi) from state capital Chandigarh. The village is administrated by a sarpanch who is an elected representative of village as per Panchayati raj (India).

The name Duhre means the "land of Duhra" or where the "Duhra's live", it comes from the family name of Duhra (ਦੂਹੜਾ). Which in turn is taken from the name of Baba Duhaar, and most (Jatt Sikhs) in the village are decedents of him. Though there are some families from the Jat caste who are not part of this family in the village. The village is well known for Soccer since the 1950s.

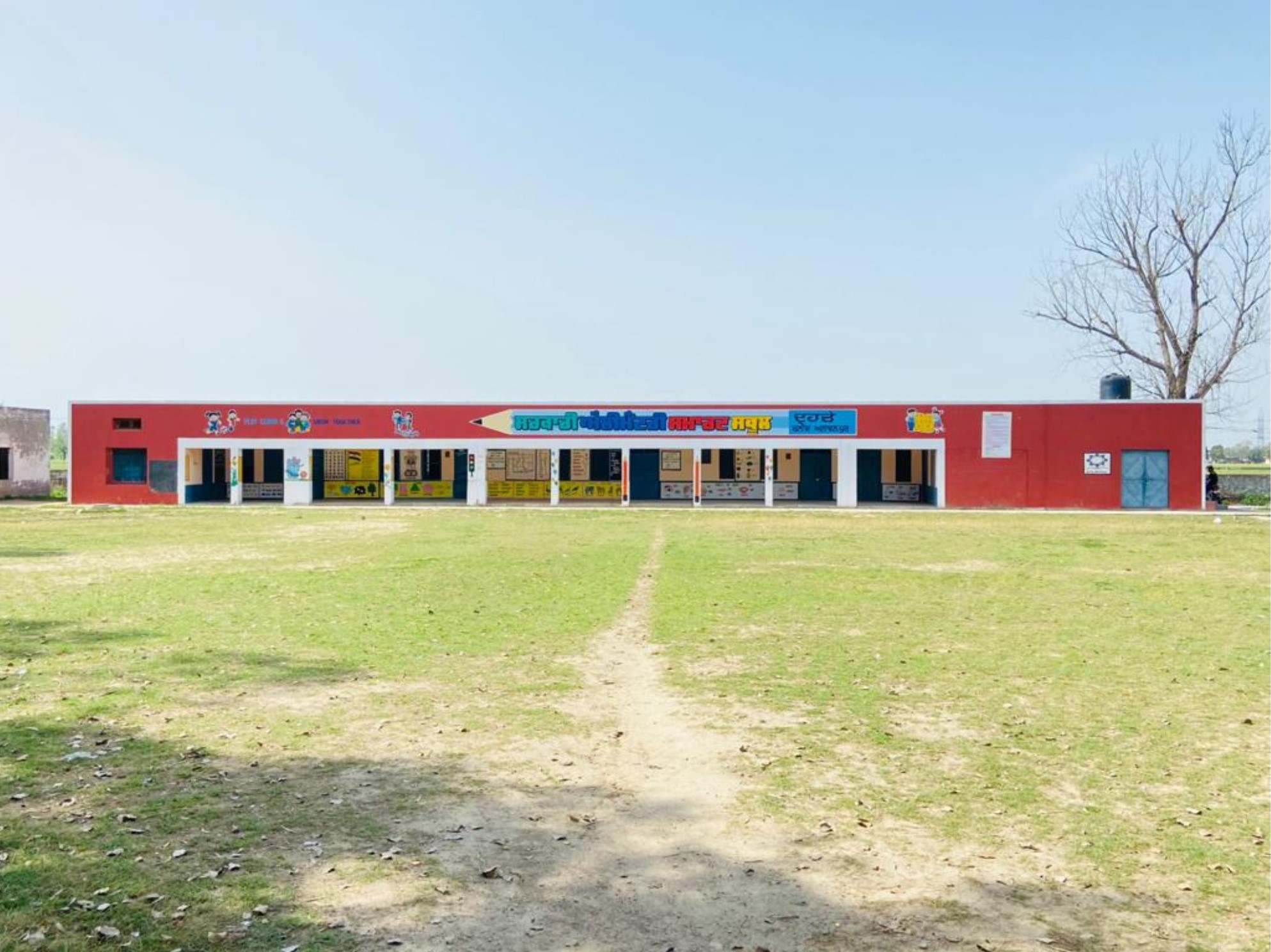
Public Elementary Smart School

== History ==
The village of Duhre was founded by the warrior/athlete Duhaar, in the mid to late 18th century. During the 18th century, the Mughal Empire had begun to weaken and crumble, with it gave rise to the 12 Sikh Misl's. The Mughal emperor at the time, Zakariya Khan Bahadur, to make peace with the Sikhs, had given the title of Nawab to Kapur Singh, who was the Jathedar (Sikh leader) of the Dal Khalsa. Later on, Nawab Kapur Singh's Singpuria Misl (Faizullahpuria Misl), under his nephew Kushal Singh, would control many territories, while having Jalandhar (taken in 1766) and its surrounding lands as its capital. Duhaar migrated from the Majha (Barri Doab, heartland) region of Punjab, from Gurdaspur area, and settled near Alawalpur (Bist Doab). Not much is known about his earlier life or his family background beside that he was a Sikh Jat. We don't know why he migrated, it could have been because of war and/or in search of work.

As a reputable athlete, Duhaar was later invited like many others to a competition of kabaddi by the Nawab of Jalandhar, Kushal Singh at Alawalpur (a territory in Jalandhar city district). The Nawab boosted about his son (the prince Budh Singh) and challenged anyone to defeat him in Kabaddi, and if they did he would grant them a prize. Duhaar took this challenge, he bested the prince and won the competition, so impressed was the Nawab that he granted Duhaar 500 acers of land and a noble title. With this he was now known as Baba Duhaar a zamindar (noble), and with 500 acers of land he founded the village of Duhre, north east of Alawalpur. Later on he would give his brother Dollu some land as well, who would use it to create the village of Dolike; less than kilometer away from Duhre. The twin villages would later be known as Dolike-Duhre.

=== The family tree of Baba Duhaar ===
Offspring of Baba Duhaar are divided into different families and these families are known by different names as given below (ਟਬਰਾਂ ਦੈ ਨਾਂ):

ਭਾਈਕੈ। ਖੁਂਡੈ। ਕਾਲੈ। ਲੰਬੜ। ਅਮਲੀ। ਲਾਬਾਣੈ। ਪਕਿਆਂਵਾਲੈ। ਮਾੜੈ। ਝੱਟੇ। ਏਕੜ। ਕੂਕੈ। ਨੌਕਰ। ਮਾਨਾਊ। ਬੁੱਚੈ। ਮੌਲੈ।

ਸਾਰੀਏ। ਖੱਬੜ (These two families are Sikh Jat but not part of the Duhra family)

Pahika, Kundhah, Kala, Lanbrr, Amli, Lubanah, Pakianhwale, Marrah, Chta, Acker, Kuukah, Nauker, Manaou, Bucah, Maulah.

Saria and Khber: are not part of the Duhra Family, they settled from outside the village during the Partition of India.

Though the nobility (zamindar) statues would not survive into present day, as the wealth and land was divide by his sons; who were later divide into 15 families. Also many of the members of this family would later migrate from Punjab, India, in search for work, and settle in: United Kingdom, Australia, USA, Europe, and Middle East.

== Geography ==
"The Duhra village is situated on Adampur to Kala Bhakra road at 31.46 Degrees North and 75.67 Degrees East. It has an average elevation of 232 meters. It is located 24 Kilometers towards North from the district headquarters of Jalandhar, 166 kilometers from State Capital Chandigarh and 6 kilometers from the Adampur Police Station. The total geographical area of the village is 196 hectares (480 acres). Post Office : Bias Pind, Pin code: 144 302, Web Site : jalandhar.nic.in, Telephone Code / Std Code : 0181. Villages surrounding Duhra village are Mali Nangal, Nangal, Sarala, Badala, Dherowal, Jaganpur, Dholike, Jaflane. The nearest big towns are Adampur, Alawalpur, Bhogpur, and Sham Chorasi and cities: Jalandhar, Amritsar, Pathankot, Hoshiarpur, and Ludhiana."

== Demography ==
As of the 2011 Indian census, Duhra village had a total population of 1406 (703 males, 703 females) and 315 houses. All the Jat Sikhs are descendants of Baba Duhaar. Different communities and technicians like: blacksmiths, carpenters, weavers, tailor-masters, ceramists, cobblers, music- bands, and goldsmiths lived in the village, so in this way, the village is considered self-sufficient and self-dependent. The major profession of the people is farming and other professions are related to it. Some Muslim families also live there, as they did not go to Pakistan in 1947 because they preferred to live in this village. With the passage of time, people have changed their professions as per their needs, and at present, there are no goldsmiths, cobblers and weavers. For their livelihood and a better life, people are migrating to cities and other countries. But even so, the village is doing well and has all the modern facilities like electricity, phone service, sewerage, television, bus service, and paved roads.
