= Alawalpur =

- Town
- Nickname: Lalpur
- Location in Punjab, India Alawalpur (India)
- Coordinates: 31.43°N 75.65°E
- Country: India
- State: Punjab
- District: Jalandhar
- Elevation: 232 m (761 ft)

Population (2001)
  - Total: 7,172

Languages
  - Official: Punjabi
- Time zone: UTC+5:30 (IST)
- Postal code: 144301

Alawalpur is a town and a municipal council in Jalandhar district in the state of Punjab, India. Alawalpur is named after Alawal Khan, a Pashtun who ruled the area during the time of Maharaja Ranjit Singh. Sardar Himmat Singh Jallewalia, a Bains Jat Sardar and a general in Ranjit Singh's army, later conquered Alawalpur. His descendants still live in a fort located in the center of the town.

== History ==
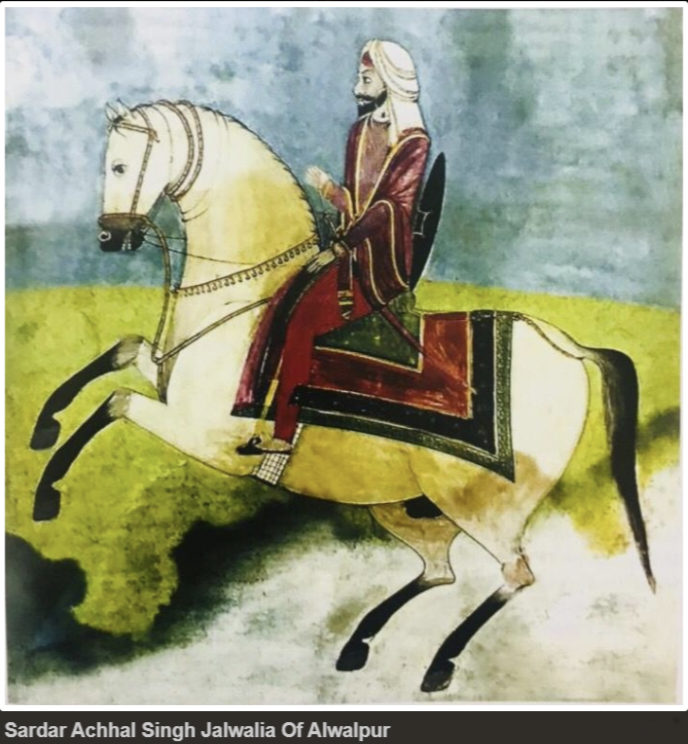
Sardar Achhal Singh Bains Jallewalia Alawalpur

Alawalpur was founded by Alawal Khan, a Pashtun. Later, the Pashtuns were overthrown by Bains Jat chief Sardar Himmat Singh Bains, son of Chaudhary Gulab Rai Bains. The Bains family had been a Zamindar Chaudhary family of Mahilpur for centuries, and later held jagirs in two villages in Adampur. After repelling Afghans, the jagir and other villages came under the control of Sardar Himmat Singh, fifth son of Chaudhary Gulab Rai. His family also held jagirs in Gurdaspur, Ludhiana, Sirhind, Nabha, Patiala, and Jind riyasats.

Jagirs in Peshawar and Multan also exceeded 120,000 INR in the 18th and 19th centuries. Sardar Himmat Singh was a vakil of Raja Jaswant Singh of Nabha and later a vakil of Maharaja Ranjit Singh. Sardar Albel Singh Bains died fighting Afghans at the Battle of Jhelum in 1824. General Ram Singh Bains was also one of Maharaja Ranjit Singh's generals from this family.

== Geography ==
Alawalpur has an average elevation of 232 metres (761 feet). It is located on the Kartarpur–Adampur road.

Villages surrounding Alawalpur include Muradpur, Doltpur, Dhogri, Sikandarpur, Sarmastpur, Sanghwal, Kishangarh among others. Alawalpur has a market that provides daily necessities to the local population. DAV University has been recently established in the village Sarmastpur, adjacent to Alawalpur. This institute provides higher education and career opportunities to the local population.

== Demographics ==
As of 2001 India census, Alawalpur had a population of 7,172. Males constitute 52% of the population and females 48%. Alawalpur has an average literacy rate of 73%, higher than the national average of 59.5%, with 55% of males and 45% of females being literate. 12% of the population is under 6 years of age.
