= 2019 King's Cup squads =

The 2019 King's Cup is an international football tournament that is currently being held in Thailand from 5 to 8 June 2019. The 4 national teams involved in the tournament are required to register a squad of 23 players.

Players marked (c) were named as captain for their national squad. Number of caps counts until the start of the tournament, including all FIFA-recognised pre-tournament friendlies. Player's age is their age on the opening day of the tournament.

== Curaçao ==
Coach: (Netherlands) Remko Bicentini

The final squad was announced on 2 June 2019.
Caps and goals are as of 12 October 2018 after the match against US Virgin Islands.

No.	Pos.	Player	Date of birth (age)	Caps	Goals	Club
1	GK	Eloy Room	6 February 1989 (aged 30)	24	0	(Royal Dutch Football Association) PSV
13	GK	Zeus de la Paz	11 March 1995 (aged 24)	2	0	(The Football Association) Oldham Athletic
16	GK	Jairzinho Pieter	11 November 1987 (aged 31)	12	0	(Curaçao Football Federation) Vesta
3	DF	Cuco Martina (captain)	25 September 1989 (aged 29)	40	2	(Royal Dutch Football Association) Feyenoord
12	DF	Shanon Carmelia	20 March 1989 (aged 30)	33	2	(Royal Dutch Football Association) IJsselmeervogels
4	DF	Darryl Lachman	11 November 1989 (aged 29)	21	1	(Royal Dutch Football Association) PEC Zwolle
22	DF	Juriën Gaari	23 December 1993 (aged 25)	6	0	(Royal Dutch Football Association) RKC
6	DF	Jurich Carolina	15 July 1998 (aged 20)	4	0	(Royal Dutch Football Association) Den Bosch
14	DF	Shermar Martina	14 April 1996 (aged 23)	3	0	(Royal Dutch Football Association) MVV
11	MF	Gevaro Nepomuceno	10 November 1992 (aged 26)	35	7	(The Football Association) Oldham Athletic
7	MF	Leandro Bacuna	21 August 1991 (aged 27)	19	11	(Football Association of Wales) Cardiff City
18	MF	Elson Hooi	1 October 1991 (aged 27)	18	6	(Royal Dutch Football Association) ADO Den Haag
8	MF	Jarchinio Antonia	27 December 1990 (aged 28)	16	0	(Cyprus Football Association) AEL Limassol
2	MF	Michaël Maria	31 January 1995 (aged 24)	11	0	(United States Soccer Federation) Charlotte Independence
23	MF	Roly Bonevacia	8 October 1991 (aged 27)	0	0	(Football Australia) Western Sydney Wanderers
5	MF	Ayrton Statie	22 July 1994 (aged 24)	9	0	(Royal Dutch Football Association) Lienden
19	MF	Gersinio Constancia	6 April 1990 (aged 29)	3	0	(Curaçao Football Federation) Jong Holland
17	MF	Shermaine Martina	14 April 1996 (aged 23)	2	0	(Royal Dutch Football Association) MVV
10	FW	Jafar Arias	16 June 1995 (aged 23)	0	0	(Royal Dutch Football Association) Emmen
9	FW	Charlison Benschop	21 August 1989 (aged 29)	3	0	(Royal Dutch Football Association) De Graafschap
15	FW	Gervane Kastaneer	9 June 1996 (aged 22)	1	0	(Royal Dutch Football Association) NAC
21	FW	Gino van Kessel	9 March 1993 (aged 26)	18	8	(Royal Belgian Football Association) Roeselare
20	FW	Jimbertson Vapor	10 February 1996 (aged 23)	0	0	(Curaçao Football Federation) Scherpenheuvel

== India ==
Coach: (Croatia) Igor Štimac

The final squad was announced on 2 June 2019.
Caps and goals are as of 14 January 2019 after the match against Bahrain.

No.	Pos.	Player	Date of birth (age)	Caps	Goals	Club
	GK	Gurpreet Singh Sandhu	3 February 1992 (aged 27)	30	0	(All India Football Federation) Bengaluru
	GK	Kamaljit Singh	28 December 1995 (aged 23)	0	0	(All India Football Federation) Pune City
	GK	Amrinder Singh	27 May 1993 (aged 26)	3	0	(All India Football Federation) Mumbai City
	DF	Adil Khan	7 July 1988 (aged 30)	3	0	(All India Football Federation) Pune City
	DF	Subhasish Bose	18 August 1995 (aged 23)	14	0	(All India Football Federation) Mumbai City
	DF	Rahul Bheke	6 December 1990 (aged 28)	0	0	(All India Football Federation) Bengaluru
	DF	Sandesh Jhingan	21 July 1993 (aged 25)	31	4	(All India Football Federation) Kerala Blasters
	DF	Pritam Kotal	8 September 1993 (aged 25)	32	0	(All India Football Federation) ATK
	MF	Amarjit Singh Kiyam	6 January 2001 (aged 18)	0	0	(All India Football Federation) Jamshedpur
	MF	Anirudh Thapa	15 January 1998 (aged 21)	17	1	(All India Football Federation) Chennaiyin
	MF	Vinit Rai	11 October 1997 (aged 21)	6	0	(All India Football Federation) Delhi Dynamos
	MF	Brandon Fernandes	20 September 1994 (aged 24)	0	0	(All India Football Federation) Goa
	MF	Pronay Halder	25 February 1993 (aged 26)	17	1	(All India Football Federation) ATK
	MF	Udanta Singh	14 June 1996 (aged 22)	18	1	(All India Football Federation) Bengaluru
	MF	Sahal Abdul Samad	1 April 1997 (aged 22)	0	0	(All India Football Federation) Kerala Blasters
	MF	Jackichand Singh	17 March 1992 (aged 27)	18	2	(All India Football Federation) Goa
	MF	Michael Soosairaj	30 October 1994 (aged 24)	0	0	(All India Football Federation) ATK
	MF	Raynier Fernandes	22 February 1996 (aged 23)	0	0	(All India Football Federation) Mumbai City
	MF	Lallianzuala Chhangte	8 June 1997 (aged 21)	7	3	(All India Football Federation) Delhi Dynamos
	FW	Farukh Choudhary	8 November 1996 (aged 22)	5	0	(All India Football Federation) Jamshedpur
	FW	Balwant Singh	15 December 1986 (aged 32)	10	3	(All India Football Federation) ATK
	FW	Sunil Chhetri (captain)	3 August 1984 (aged 34)	107	67	(All India Football Federation) Bengaluru
	FW	Manvir Singh	7 November 1995 (aged 23)	6	3	(All India Football Federation) Goa

== Thailand ==
Coach: (Thailand) Sirisak Yodyardthai (caretaker)

The final squad was announced on 4 June 2019.
Caps and goals are as of 25 March 2019 after the match against Uruguay.

No.	Pos.	Player	Date of birth (age)	Caps	Goals	Club
1	GK	Kawin Thamsatchanan	26 January 1990 (aged 29)	64	0	(Royal Belgian Football Association) OH Leuven
20	GK	Chatchai Budprom	4 February 1987 (aged 32)	9	0	(Football Association of Thailand) BG Pathum United
23	GK	Siwarak Tedsungnoen	20 April 1984 (aged 35)	18	0	(Football Association of Thailand) Buriram United
2	DF	Peerapat Notchaiya	4 February 1993 (aged 26)	29	1	(Football Association of Thailand) Bangkok United
3	DF	Theerathon Bunmathan	6 February 1990 (aged 29)	58	5	(Japan Football Association) Yokohama F. Marinos
5	DF	Adisorn Promrak	21 October 1993 (aged 25)	29	0	(Football Association of Thailand) Muangthong United
6	DF	Pansa Hemviboon	8 July 1990 (aged 28)	18	4	(Football Association of Thailand) Buriram United
19	DF	Tristan Do	31 January 1993 (aged 26)	30	0	(Football Association of Thailand) Bangkok United
26	DF	Suphan Thongsong	26 August 1994 (aged 24)	6	0	(Football Association of Thailand) Suphanburi
30	DF	Pawee Tanthatemee	22 October 1996 (aged 22)	0	0	(Football Association of Thailand) Ratchaburi Mitr Phol
4	MF	Sarach Yooyen	30 May 1992 (aged 27)	38	0	(Football Association of Thailand) Muangthong United
7	MF	Sumanya Purisai	5 December 1986 (aged 32)	18	0	(Football Association of Thailand) Port
8	MF	Thitiphan Puangchan	1 September 1993 (aged 25)	30	6	(Japan Football Association) Oita Trinita
11	MF	Peeradon Chamratsamee	15 September 1992 (aged 26)	3	0	(Football Association of Thailand) Samut Prakan City
13	MF	Picha Autra	7 January 1996 (aged 23)	1	0	(Football Association of Thailand) Samut Prakan City
16	MF	Siwakorn Jakkuprasat	23 April 1992 (aged 27)	0	0	(Football Association of Thailand) Port
17	MF	Tanaboon Kesarat	21 September 1993 (aged 25)	45	1	(Football Association of Thailand) Port
28	MF	Supachok Sarachat	22 May 1998 (aged 21)	1	0	(Football Association of Thailand) Buriram United
9	FW	Adisak Kraisorn	1 February 1991 (aged 28)	37	16	(Football Association of Thailand) Muangthong United
10	FW	Teerasil Dangda (captain)	6 June 1988 (aged 30)	99	43	(Football Association of Thailand) Muangthong United
14	FW	Surachat Sareepim	24 May 1986 (aged 33)	6	0	(Football Association of Thailand) BG Pathum United
22	FW	Supachai Jaided	1 December 1998 (aged 20)	12	4	(Football Association of Thailand) Buriram United
29	FW	Suphanat Mueanta	2 August 2002 (aged 16)	0	0	(Football Association of Thailand) Buriram United

== Vietnam ==
Coach: (South Korea) Park Hang-seo

The final squad was announced on 31 May 2019.
Caps and goals are as of 25 January 2019 after the match against Japan.

No.	Pos.	Player	Date of birth (age)	Caps	Goals	Club
22	GK	Nguyễn Văn Toản	26 November 1999 (aged 19)	0	0	(Vietnam Football Federation) Hải Phòng
1	GK	Trần Nguyên Mạnh	20 December 1991 (aged 27)	24	0	(Vietnam Football Federation) Sông Lam Nghệ An
23	GK	Đặng Văn Lâm	13 August 1993 (aged 25)	15	0	(Football Association of Thailand) Muangthong United
2	DF	Đỗ Duy Mạnh (3rd captain)	29 September 1996 (aged 22)	19	0	(Vietnam Football Federation) Hà Nội
3	DF	Quế Ngọc Hải (captain)	15 May 1993 (aged 26)	42	2	(Vietnam Football Federation) Viettel
21	DF	Trần Đình Trọng	25 April 1997 (aged 22)	9	0	(Vietnam Football Federation) Hà Nội
4	DF	Bùi Tiến Dũng	2 October 1995 (aged 23)	20	0	(Vietnam Football Federation) Viettel
5	DF	Đoàn Văn Hậu	19 April 1999 (aged 20)	16	0	(Vietnam Football Federation) Hà Nội
7	DF	Nguyễn Phong Hồng Duy	13 June 1996 (aged 22)	7	0	(Vietnam Football Federation) Hoàng Anh Gia Lai
12	DF	Huỳnh Tấn Sinh	6 April 1998 (aged 21)	0	0	(Vietnam Football Federation) Quảng Nam
17	DF	Vũ Văn Thanh	14 April 1996 (aged 23)	15	2	(Vietnam Football Federation) Hoàng Anh Gia Lai
6	MF	Lương Xuân Trường (vice-captain)	28 April 1995 (aged 24)	31	1	(Football Association of Thailand) Buriram United
14	MF	Nguyễn Tuấn Anh	16 May 1995 (aged 24)	8	1	(Vietnam Football Federation) Hoàng Anh Gia Lai
8	MF	Nguyễn Trọng Hoàng	14 April 1989 (aged 30)	62	12	(Vietnam Football Federation) Viettel
20	MF	Trần Minh Vương	28 March 1995 (aged 24)	3	0	(Vietnam Football Federation) Hoàng Anh Gia Lai
15	MF	Phạm Đức Huy	20 January 1995 (aged 24)	7	1	(Vietnam Football Federation) Hà Nội
16	MF	Đỗ Hùng Dũng	8 September 1993 (aged 25)	12	0	(Vietnam Football Federation) Hà Nội
13	MF	Trần Văn Kiên	13 May 1996 (aged 23)	0	0	(Vietnam Football Federation) Hà Nội
9	FW	Nguyễn Văn Toàn	12 April 1996 (aged 23)	21	4	(Vietnam Football Federation) Hoàng Anh Gia Lai
10	FW	Nguyễn Công Phượng	21 January 1995 (aged 24)	31	8	(Korea Football Association) Incheon United
18	FW	Hà Đức Chinh	22 September 1997 (aged 21)	6	0	(Vietnam Football Federation) SHB Đà Nẵng
11	FW	Nguyễn Anh Đức	24 October 1985 (aged 33)	32	11	(Vietnam Football Federation) Becamex Bình Dương
19	FW	Nguyễn Quang Hải	12 April 1997 (aged 22)	17	5	(Vietnam Football Federation) Hà Nội
