= Zumba (mascot) =

Mascot for the Sporting Clube de Goa of Goa Professional League

- Zumba in 2011
- Team: Sporting Clube de Goa
- Description: Reddish-brown lion
- First seen: 23 October 2011; 14 years ago
- Last seen: 16 August 2013; 12 years ago
- Website: sportingclubedegoa.in

Zumba is the official mascot for Goa Professional League's Sporting Clube de Goa. Portrayed as a lion, Zumba first appeared in 2011, during the club's debut in the fifth season of the I-League. He was the first live mascot introduced in the league.

== Launch ==
On 23 October 2011, Sporting Clube de Goa, introduced its official mascot named Zumba. The unveiling of Zumba took place during a special event where the club also premiered its theme song titled "Flaming Oranje." This anthem was composed by the well-known Goan band, Sky High.

During the intermission, Alan Sequeira, a national motocross champion, made an entrance into the pavilion accompanied by Zumba. The event was graced by Bruno Coutinho, a recipient of the Arjuna Award, who served as the chief guest. A significant moment of the occasion occurred when Coutinho unveiled the theme song, titled 'Flaming Oranje'.

== Appearances ==
On 16 August 2013, Zumba made an appearance during the inauguration of the SCG Football Academy at the Don Bosco grounds in Panjim. The event marked the 15th anniversary of Sporting Clube de Goa.
