= 2016–17 Santosh Trophy =

2017 Santosh Trophy
Tournament details
- Country: India
- Dates: 12 – 26 March 2017
- Teams: 10

Final positions
- Champions: West Bengal (32nd title)
- Runners-up: Goa

Tournament statistics
- Matches played: 23
- Goals scored: 54 (2.35 per match)

The 2016–17 Santosh Trophy was the 71st edition of the Santosh Trophy, the main state competition for football in India.

Services are the reigning champions. Teams such as Gujarat, Tamil Nadu, and Kerala have begun preparations for the tournament.

== Qualified teams ==
The following 10 teams have qualified for the Santosh Trophy proper.

- Chandigarh
- Punjab
- Kerala
- Services
- Mizoram
- Maharashtra
- Railways
- Goa
- Meghalaya
- West Bengal

== Group stage ==
=== Group A ===
Pos	Team	Pld	W	D	L	GF	GA	GD	Pts	Qualification
1	West Bengal	4	3	1	0	4	0	+4	10	Advance to Semi-finals
2	Goa	4	2	2	0	5	2	+3	8	Advance to Semi-finals
3	Chandigarh	4	1	1	2	3	4	−1	4	
4	Meghalaya	4	1	0	3	4	6	−2	3	
5	Services	4	1	0	3	2	6	−4	3	

Rules for classification: 1) points; 2) head-to-head points; 3) head-to-head goal difference; 4) goal difference; 5) number of goals scored; 6) drawing of lots

==== Fixtures and Results ====
12 March 2017	Goa	2–1	Meghalaya	Bambolim
IST	Latesh Mandrekar 50'; Liston Colaco 52'	Report	Enester Malngiang 55'	Stadium: GMC Athletic Stadium

12 March 2017	Chandigarh	0–1	West Bengal	Navelim
IST		Report	S. K. Faiaz 90'	Stadium: Navelim Football Ground

14 March 2017	Chandigarh	2–1	Meghalaya	Vasco da Gama
IST	Gagandeep Singh 64'; Sehijpal Singh	Report	Kitboklang Pale 51'	Stadium: Tilak Maidan Stadium

14 March 2017	Services	0–1	West Bengal	Bambolim
IST		Report Archived 2025-04-09 at the Wayback Machine(subscription required)	Moirangthem Basanta Singh 22'	Stadium: GMC Athletic Stadium

16 March 2017	Services	1–0	Chandigarh	Vasco da Gama
IST		Report	Francis Zountlunga 8' (pen.)	Stadium: Tilak Maidan Stadium

16 March 2017	Goa	0–0	West Bengal	Bambolim
IST		Report		Stadium: GMC Athletic Stadium

18 March 2017	Meghalaya	2–0	Services	Vasco da Gama
IST	Dibinroy Nongspung 8'; Bisharalng Kharumnuid 76'	Report		Stadium: Tilak Maidan Stadium

18 March 2017	Goa	1–1	Chandigarh	Bambolim
IST	Aaren D'Silva 13'	Report	Sehjpal Singh 51'	Stadium: GMC Athletic Stadium

20 March 2017	Goa	2–1	Services	Bambolim
IST	Akeraj Martins 82'; Cajetan Fernandes 89'	Report	Arjun Tudu 8'	Stadium: GMC Athletic Stadium

20 March 2017	West Bengal	2–0	Meghalaya	Vasco da Gama
IST	Ronald Singh Shaikhom 9'; Manvir Singh 86'	Report		Stadium: Tilak Maidan Stadium

=== Group B ===
Pos	Team	Pld	W	D	L	GF	GA	GD	Pts	Qualification
1	Kerala	4	2	1	1	10	7	+3	7	Advance to Semi-finals
2	Mizoram	4	2	1	1	9	6	+3	7	Advance to Semi-finals
3	Maharashtra	4	2	0	2	4	4	0	6	
4	Punjab	4	1	2	1	4	3	+1	5	
5	Railways	4	1	0	3	5	11	−6	3	

Rules for classification: 1) points; 2) head-to-head points; 3) head-to-head goal difference; 4) goal difference; 5) number of goals scored; 6) drawing of lots

==== Fixtures and Results ====
13 March 2017	Punjab	2–1	Railways	Navelim
IST	Rajbir Singh 16', 61'	Report	Rajesh Soosanayakam 59'	Stadium: Navelim Football Ground

13 March 2017	Mizoram	3–1	Maharashtra	Bambolim
IST	Lalchhuanawma Vanchhawng 7'; Lalrinpuia; Lalsangbera Sangbera 55'	Report	Rahul Das 11'	Stadium: GMC Athletic Stadium

15 March 2017	Punjab	0–0	Mizoram	Vasco da Gama
IST		Report		Stadium: Tilak Maidan Stadium

15 March 2017	Kerala	4–2	Railways	Bambolim
IST	Jobby Justin 21', 46', 63'; Usman 71'	Report Archived 2025-04-10 at the Wayback Machine(subscription required)	Rajesh Soosanayakam 17', 86'	Stadium: GMC Athletic Stadium

17 March 2017	Railways	1–0	Maharashtra	Bambolim
IST	Rahul Das 9' (o.g.)	Report		Stadium: GMC Athletic Stadium

17 March 2017	Punjab	2–2	Kerala	Bambolim
IST	Sherin Sam 49' (o.g.); Manvir Singh 57'	Report	Muhammed Parakkottil 89', 90+4'	Stadium: GMC Athletic Stadium

19 March 2017	Punjab	0–1	Maharashtra	Vasco da Gama
IST		Report	Shetty 63'	Stadium: Tilak Maidan Stadium

19 March 2017	Mizoram	1–4	Kerala	Vasco da Gama
IST	Lalrammawia Rammawia 86'	Report	Jobby Justin 7'; Sreesan S. 9'; Asharudeen 64', 84'	Stadium: Tilak Maidan Stadium; Referee: Crystal John

21 March 2017	Mizoram	5–1	Railways	Bambolim
IST	Lalchhuanawma Vanchhawng 24'; Lalrinpuia 60', 82'; Lalrinchhana Rcha 71'; Lalsangbera Sanbera 78' (pen.)	Report	Jitendra Pal 42'	Stadium: GMC Athletic Stadium

21 March 2017	Kerala	0–2	Maharashtra	Vasco da Gama
IST		Report	Vaibhav Shirley 34'; Shrikant Veeramallu 59'	Stadium: Tilak Maidan Stadium

== Knockout stage ==
Semi-finals
23 March 2017
West Bengal	0(6)
Mizoram	0(5)
23 March 2017
Goa	2
Kerala	1

Final
25 March 2017
West Bengal	1
Goa	0

=== Semi-finals ===
23 March 2017
15:00 IST

West Bengal	0–0 (a.e.t.)	Mizoram
	Report
Penalties
Rana Gharami (penalty scored); Manvir Singh (penalty scored); Samad Ali Mallick (penalty scored); Mumtaz Akthar (penalty scored); Monotosh Chakladar (penalty missed); S. K. Faiaz (penalty scored); Moirangthem Basanta Singh (penalty scored)	6–5	Lalrammawia Rammawia (penalty scored); Ramfangzuava (penalty scored); Lalrammuanpuia Apuia (penalty scored); Lalalrinchhana Rcha (penalty scored); Fialmuanawma Muanawma (penalty missed); Lalchhuanawma (penalty scored); Lalbiakhlua (penalty missed)

GMC Athletic Stadium, Bambolim
23 March 2017
19:00 IST

Goa	2–1	Kerala
Liston Colaco 13', 36'	Report	Rahul Raj 61'

GMC Athletic Stadium, Bambolim

=== Final ===
26 March 2017
18:00 IST

Goa	0–1 (a.e.t.)	West Bengal
	Report	Manvir Singh 119'

GMC Athletic Stadium, Bambolim
Attendance: ≈5,000
