= Manvir Singh (footballer, born 1995) =

Indian footballer

Personal information
- Full name: Manvir Singh
- Date of birth: 6 November 1995 (age 31)
- Place of birth: Duhre, Punjab, India
- Height: 1.87 m (6 ft 2 in)
- Position: Winger

Team information
- Current team: Mohun Bagan
- Number: 11

Youth career
- –2015: Minerva Punjab

Senior career*
Years	Team	Apps	(Gls)
2015–2016	Minerva Punjab	14	(4)
2016–2017	Mohammedan	6	(2)
2016–2017	Southern Samity	5	(0)
2017–2020	Goa	47	(3)
2020–	Mohun Bagan	124	(25)

International career^{‡}
2017	India U23	3	(1)
2017–	India	52	(7)
Medal record
Men's football
Representing India
SAFF Championship
Winner	2021 Maldives
- * Club domestic league appearances and goals as of 17:27, 1 March 2026 (UTC) ‡ National team caps and goals as of 22:00, 6 October 2026 (UTC)

Manvir Singh (born 6 November 1995) is an Indian professional footballer who plays as a winger for Indian Super League club Mohun Bagan and the India national team.

== Early life ==
Manvir was born in Duhre (Duhra) village of Sangrur district of Punjab to his father Kuldip Singh. He has one sibling, a brother named Harkamal Singh. Manvir was inspired by his footballer father to take up football. His father used to play in Punjab for JCT FC and represented Punjab in Santosh Trophy.

== Club career ==
=== Youth career and early career: 2015–17 ===
Manvir did his youth career in the Minerva Academy FC (current Punjab FC). He signed his first professional contract with the senior team of Minerva Academy and represented them in the 2015–16 I-League 2nd Division. After his one-year tenure with Minerva, Manvir signed for Mohammedan SC for the 2016–17 I-League 2nd Division. He left Mohammedan SC and played his rest of the 2016–17 season with Southern Samity. While playing for Southern Samity, Manvir got his national call-up for the India U23 team to take part in the 2018 AFC U-23 Championship qualifiers. On 26 March 2017, Manvir scored the winning goal in the 2017 Santosh Trophy final for West Bengal against Goa, which resulted in their 0–1 victory in the final.

=== FC Goa: 2017–2020 ===
On 28 July 2017, it was announced that Manvir had signed a contract with Indian Super League club FC Goa. He made his debut for the club in the 2017–18 Indian Super League as a substitute for Manuel Lanzarote against Chennaiyin FC on 19 November 2017, which they won 2–3. He ended his 2017–18 ISL season goalless. Manvir played his first match of the 2018–19 Indian Super League on 1 October 2018 in a 2–2 draw against NorthEast United FC, where he started as a substitute for Mandar Rao Desai. He scored his debut goal on 11 November in the match against Kerala Blasters FC, where he scored the last goal for Goa, as they won the match 1–3 at full-time. Goa had a standout season once again, and went on to qualify for the 2019 Indian Super League final. Manvir started as a substitute for Jackichand Singh in the final against Bengaluru FC on 17 March 2019, which they lost 0–1 at extra-time, after Bengaluru found their vital goal in the last moments of the game. Manvir netted his first of the 2019–20 Indian Super League on 1 November 2019 against NorthEast United, where he scored the equalising goal in the injury time, that resulted in the match going to a 2–2 draw. He scored his second of the season against Hyderabad FC on 8 December, where he scored the only goal by coming in as a substitute for Seiminlen Doungel, as the match ended 0–1 to Goa. Manvir started as a substitute for Seiminlen Doungel in the match against Jamshedpur FC on 19 February 2020, which they won 0–5. This match was the last match of FC Goa before knockout stages, and they were awarded with ISL League Winners Shield for finishing as table toppers of the season. Thus, Manvir won his first club silverware with FC Goa on a historic event. Goa qualified for the knockout stages of the ISL once again and met Chennaiyin on both legs. Manvir started in the first leg as a line-up starter, and started in the second leg as a substitute. Both legs of the semi-final were high scoring matches, and FC Goa was knocked out by Chennaiyin by an aggregate score of 6–5. He was also a part of the FC Goa team that won the 2019 Indian Super Cup. After the 2019–20 ISL season, Manvir left FC Goa after a three-year stay for Mohun Bagan Super Giant.

=== Mohun Bagan: 2020–present ===
==== 2020–21 ISL season ====
On 25 August 2020, it was announced that Mohun Bagan Super Giant had secured Manvir Singh under a three-year contract. After negotiating a transfer fee with FC Goa, it was declared by the Gaurs as their biggest transfer fee received by the club for a player till the date. His transfer fee closed by Mohun Bagan Super Giant is the third highest fee paid for an Indian player by any club in the history of Indian football. He made his debut for the club in the opening match of the 2020–21 Indian Super League against Kerala Blasters on 20 November 2020, which ended 0–1 to Mohun Bagan Super Giant. He scored his debut goal for the club against fierce rivals SC East Bengal on 27 November, which they won 0–2 at full-time. Manvir found the net again on 11 December in the match against Hyderabad, which concluded in a 1–1 draw. He scored a brace against Odisha FC on 6 February 2021, where he opened the score-sheet, and also found the net when the match was in the event of deadlock, that resulted in a 1–4 victory for MBSG. Manvir scored his fifth goal of the season on 22 February against Hyderabad in the second match against them that season, which ended in a 2–2 draw, after he restored the draw in the beginning. After Mohun Bagan Super Giant qualified for the playoffs and met NorthEast United in both legs, Manvir scored in the second leg against them on 9 March, which ended 2–1 to Mohun Bagan Super Giant. His goal was a vital goal that helped MBSG to progress through to the final of the 2020–21 ISL season, after an aggregate win of 3–2 from both legs. Manvir started in the final against Mumbai City FC on 13 March 2021, which they lost 2–1 after Mumbai City found their all important goal in the last minute of the match.

== International career ==
Manvir represented India U23, when he was called up to squad for the 2018 AFC U-23 Championship qualifiers. He played all three group stage matches for India against Syria, Qatar, and Turkmenistan respectively. He scored his debut goal for the under-23 team in the match against Turkmenistan on 23 July 2017, where he scored the equalising goal, as India made a comeback and defeat them with a score of 3–1. Manvir made a total of 3 appearances for the under-23 team, and was called up for the senior national team along with many under-23 players by Stephen Constantine.

After the 2018 AFC U-23 Championship qualifiers, Manvir was called up for the senior team for the 2017 Hero Tri-Nation Series, and made his debut against Mauritius in the opening match on 19 August 2017, which ended 2–1 to India. He was then selected for the squad to compete in the 2019 AFC Asian Cup qualifiers. A year later, Manvir was called up for the squad to travel to Bangladesh for the 2018 SAFF Championship. He found his senior national debut goal in the competition against Maldives on 9 September 2018, where he scored the second goal and sealed the game 2–0 for India. India qualified for the semi-finals of the tournament, and played against arch-rivals Pakistan on 12 September, where Manvir scored a brace and helped India to progress through to final with the score of 3–1. India announced their squad for the 2019 King's Cup, where Manvir was included. He played only one match in the tournament, and that was against Thailand as a substitute for Balwant Singh on 8 June 2019, which ended in a 0–1 victory for India. Manvir was called up for the senior squad to take part in the 2022 FIFA World Cup qualifiers, after his good form at FC Goa. He played his first qualifier match against Oman as a substitute for Ashique Kuruniyan on 5 September 2019, which ended in 1–2 defeat for India. He also appeared in the match against Qatar on 10 September, where India put on an excellent show, as they drew the continental champions 0–0 at full-time. Manvir found the net again in the friendly match against Oman on 25 March 2021, where he scored the equalising goal, as it helped India to draw the match 1–1 after a strong second-half show.

On 16 November 2023, Manvir scored India's only goal as India made history with the first ever competitive win against any Middle Eastern host, beating host Kuwait 1–0 at the 2026 FIFA World Cup qualification.

== Style of play ==
Manvir is a forward. He is a skilful player, who likes to hold the ball and make use of the strength to hold off the opposition. His former coach at Mohun Bagan, Antonio Habas, used him as a substitute player in beginning of the 2020–21 ISL season, who later deployed 4-3-3 and 4-4-2 formation to suit Manvir, after making a comment on the impact Manvir had on the pitch.

== Personal life ==
Manvir was born in Duhre, Punjab in India on 6 November 1995. He went to Khalsa College before joining the Minerva Academy. His father Kuldip Singh played professional football, and had represented JCT FC, and had also took part in the Santosh Trophy for Punjab. Manvir has one sibling named Harkamal Singh.

== Career statistics ==
=== Club ===
As of 5 November 2026

Club	Season	League			Durand Cup		Super Cup		AFC		Other		Total	
Club	Season	Division	Apps	Goals	Apps	Goals	Apps	Goals	Apps	Goals	Apps	Goals	Apps	Goals
Minerva Punjab	2015–16	I-League 2nd Division	14	4	–		–		–		–		14	4
Minerva Punjab	Total		14	4	0	0	0	0	0	0	0	0	14	4
Mohammedan	2016–17	I-League 2nd Division	6	2	–		–		–		10 (Note: Appearances in Calcutta League)	4	16	6
Mohammedan	Total		6	2	0	0	0	0	0	0	10	4	16	6
Southern Samity	2016–17	I-League 2nd Division	5	0	–		–		–		–		5	0
Southern Samity	Total		5	0	0	0	0	0	0	0	0	0	5	0
Goa	2017–18	Indian Super League	9	0	–		2	1	–		–		11	1
Goa	2018–19	Indian Super League	19	1	–		3	0	–		–		22	1
Goa	2019–20	Indian Super League	19	2	–		–		–		–		19	2
Goa	Total		47	3	–		5	1	–		–		52	4
Mohun Bagan	2020–21	Indian Super League	23	6	–		–		–		–		23	6
Mohun Bagan	2021–22	Indian Super League	22	6	–		–		4 (Note: 2021 AFC Cup)	1	–		26	7
Mohun Bagan	2022–23	Indian Super League	18	2	4	0	3	1	6 (Note: AFC Cup 2022)	2	1 (Note: Appearance in Indian club qualifiers for 2023–24 AFC competitions)	0	32	5
Mohun Bagan	2023–24	Indian Super League	23	4	6	2	0	0	5 (Note: AFC Cup 2023)	0	–		34	6
Mohun Bagan	2024-25	Indian Super League	25	5	4	1	0	0	1 (Note: ACL TWO 2024)	0	–		30	6
Mohun Bagan	2025-26	Indian Super League	13	2	1	1	3	0	0 (Note: 2025 ACL Two)	0	2 (Note: Appearance(s) in IFA Shield)	0	19	3
Mohun Bagan	2026-27	Indian Super League	5	1	6	5	0	0	–		7 (Note: 6 Appearance(s)and 5 Goals in Calcutta Football League and 1 Appearance in IFA Shield)	5	18	11
Mohun Bagan	Total		129	26	21	9	6	1	16	3	10	5	182	44
Career total			201	35	21	9	11	2	16	3	20	9	269	58

=== International ===
As of 6 October 2026

National team	Year	Apps	Goals
India	2017	2	0
India	2018	4	3
India	2019	9	0
India	2021	12	2
India	2022	6	1
India	2023	4	1
India	2024	10	0
India	2025	1	0
India	2026	4	0
Total		52	7

==== International goals ====
As of match played 16 November 2023
India score listed first, score column indicates score after each Manvir Singh goal

No.	Date	Venue	Cap	Opponent	Score	Result	Competition	Ref.
1	9 September 2018	Bangabandhu National Stadium, Dhaka, Bangladesh	4	Maldives	2–0	2–0	2018 SAFF Championship	
2	12 September 2018	Bangabandhu National Stadium, Dhaka, Bangladesh	5	Pakistan	1–0	3–1	2018 SAFF Championship	
3	12 September 2018	Bangabandhu National Stadium, Dhaka, Bangladesh	5	Pakistan	2–0	3–1	2018 SAFF Championship	
4	25 March 2021	Maktoum bin Rashid Al Maktoum Stadium, Dubai, United Arab Emirates	16	Oman	1–1	1–1	Friendly	
5	13 October 2021	National Football Stadium, Malé, Maldives	26	Maldives	1–0	3–1	2021 SAFF Championship	
6	14 June 2022	Salt Lake Stadium, Kolkata, India	33	Hong Kong	3–0	4–0	2023 AFC Asian Cup qualification	
7	16 November 2023	Jaber Al-Ahmad International Stadium, Kuwait City, Kuwait	37	Kuwait	1–0	1–0	2026 FIFA World Cup qualification	

== Honours ==
FC Goa

- Super Cup: 2019
- Indian Super League Premiers: 2019–20

Mohun Bagan

- Indian Super League Cup: 2022–23, 2024–25
- Indian Super League Shield: 2023–24, 2024–25
- Durand Cup: 2023
- IFA Shield: 2025, 2026
- Calcutta Football League: 2026

India

- SAFF Championship: 2021
- Tri-Nation Series: 2017, 2023

Others

- Santosh Trophy: 2016–17
