= 2016–17 Goa Professional League =

Goa Professional League
- Season: 2016–17
- Champions: Salgaocar FC; 8th GPL title 22nd Goan title
- Relegated: Clube Sao Miguel de Taleigao
- Matches played: 63
- Goals scored: 190 (3.02 per match)
- Top goalscorer: (India) Liston Colaco (13 goals)
- All statistics correct as of 30 November 2016.

The 2016–17 Goa Professional League is the 19th season of the Goa Professional League, the top football league in the Indian state of Goa, since its establishment 1996. The league began on 21 August 2016 and will conclude in January 2017. The first phase of the league shall have majority of matches played at the Duler Stadium.

Sporting Goa are the defending champions.

== Teams ==
Team	City/Town
Calangute Association	Calangute
Churchill Brothers	Salcete
Clube Sao Miguel de Taleigao	Taleigao
Corps of Signal	Navelim
Dempo	Panaji
FC Bardez	Bardez
Guardian Angel	Curchorem
Salgaocar	Vasco da Gama
Santa Cruz Club of Cavelossim	Cavelossim
Sporting Clube de Goa	Panaji
Vasco	Vasco da Gama

== Standings and results ==
=== Standings ===
Pos	Team	Pld	W	D	L	GF	GA	GD	Pts	Qualification or relegation
1	Salgaocar	19	14	4	1	43	11	+32	46	Champion
2	Sporting Goa	19	12	6	1	40	8	+32	42	
3	Dempo	19	12	3	4	48	18	+30	39	
4	Calangute Association	19	9	6	4	18	10	+8	33	
5	FC Bardez	19	8	7	4	26	14	+12	31	
6	Guardian Angel	19	7	6	6	26	29	−3	27	
7	Santa Cruz Club of Cavelossim	19	7	4	8	27	31	−4	25	
8	Corps of Signal	19	4	4	11	17	38	−21	16	
9	Churchill Brothers	18	3	4	11	14	33	−19	13	
10	Vasco	19	4	1	14	18	44	−26	13	
11	Clube Sao Miguel de Taleigao	19	0	3	16	9	50	−41	3	Relegation to the First Division

Source: goa-fa.com thif-live.com
Rules for classification: 1) points; 2) goal difference; 3) number of goals scored

=== Results ===
Home \ Away	CAL	CHU	COS	CSM	DSC	FCB	GUA	SFC	SSC	SCG	VSC
Calangute Association		1–0		1–0	1–0	0–0			3–1	1–1	0–2
Churchill Brothers	0–0			1–0	0–2	0–0	0–1	2–2			3–2
Corps of Signal	2–1	0–0			1–1	0–4	0–0	0–1	1–3	1–6	
Clube Sao Miguel de Taleigao	0–2	1–4	1–1		1–1	0–6		0–2	2–4	0–2	0–2
Dempo	3–1		4–1	3–1		3–0	5–0	2–1	7–0	0–1	
FC Bardez	0–1	2–1	3–1	1–1	1–0		0–0	0–2	0–0	0–0	1–0
Guardian Angel	0–1	1–2		4–0	1–3			1–4	1–1	2–2	3–0
Salgaocar	0–0	5–0	3–1				4–0		4–0	1–1	1–0
Santa Cruz Club of Cavelossim	0–2		4–0	0–4	0–2		1–1	1–2			2–1
Sporting Goa	0–0	4–0	2–0	1–0			1–1	0–1	2–0		
Vasco	1–1	3–1	3–1	2–0	3–7		0–1	0–5	0–4	0–5	

Source: thif-live.com
Legend: Blue = home team win; Yellow = draw; Red = away team win.

== Top scorers ==
As of matches played on 31 December 2016

Rank	Player	Club	Goals
1	(India) Liston Colaco	Salgaocar	13
2	(Nigeria) Felix Chidi Odili	Dempo	8
3	(India) Melwin Fernandes	Cavelossim	5
4	(Ghana) Francis Dadzie	Sporting Goa	4
4	(India) Beevan D'Mello	Dempo	4
4	(Nigeria) Koko Sakibo	FC Bardez	4
