= Mackroy Peixote =

Indian footballer

Personal information
- Date of birth: 11 May 1990 (age 36)
- Place of birth: Goa, India
- Height: 1.62 m (5 ft 4 in)
- Position: Striker

Team information
- Current team: Laxmi Prasad

Senior career*
Years	Team	Apps	(Gls)
2011–2014	Sporting Goa		
2014–	Laxmi Prasad		
- * Club domestic league appearances and goals as of 19 March 2015

Mackroy Peixote (born 11 May 1990) is an Indian footballer who plays for Laxmi Prasad in the Goa Professional League.

== Career ==
=== Sporting Clube de Goa ===
In June 2011 Mackroy signed for Sporting Clube de Goa who play in the I-League. He then made his debut for Sporting Goa on 23 October 2011 against Prayag United in the I-League.

=== Laxmi Prasad and Goa ===
In September 2014 it was revealed that Peixote was playing in the Goa Professional League with Laxmi Prasad. He also played for the club in October in the Durand Cup.

In 2015, he was a part of the Goa Santosh Trophy team.
