= 2017–18 Goa Professional League =

Goa Professional League
- Season: 2017–18
- Champions: Sporting Clube de Goa; 4th GPL title 4th Goan title
- Relegated: Santa Cruz Club of Cavelossim
- Matches played: 132
- Goals scored: 418 (3.17 per match)
- Top goalscorer: (Nigeria) Joel Sunday (20 goals)

The 2017–18 Goa Professional League is the 20th season of the Goa Professional League, the top football league in the Indian state of Goa, since its establishment 1996. The league began on 1 October 2017 and will conclude in March 2018.

The first phase of the league matches are being played at the Duler Stadium and second phase of the league matches will be played at the Tilak Maidan.

Salgaocar are the defending champions.

== Teams ==
Team	City/Town
Calangute Association	Calangute
Churchill Brothers	Salcete
Corps of Signal	Navelim
Dempo	Panaji
FC Bardez	Bardez
FC Goa	Panaji
Guardian Angel F.C.	Curchorem
Panjim Footballers	Panaji
Salgaocar	Vasco da Gama
Santa Cruz Club of Cavelossim	Cavelossim
Sporting Clube de Goa	Panaji
Vasco	Vasco da Gama

== Standings ==
Pos	Team	Pld	W	D	L	GF	GA	GD	Pts	Qualification or relegation
1	Sporting Goa	13	10	3	0	32	11	+21	33	Champion
2	Dempo	13	9	1	3	26	13	+13	28	
3	Salgaocar	11	4	2	5	21	17	+4	14	
4	FC Goa	11	4	3	4	18	15	+3	15	
5	Calangute Association	12	5	3	4	14	13	+1	18	
6	Guardian Angel	12	5	2	5	15	14	+1	17	
7	Churchill Brothers	5	1	2	2	5	8	−3	5	
8	Vasco	10	2	3	5	12	19	−7	9	
9	Panjim Footballers	11	2	4	5	13	24	−11	10	
10	Corps of Signal	11	4	2	5	11	19	−8	14	
11	FC Bardez	11	4	3	4	25	28	−3	15	
12	Santa Cruz Club of Cavelossim	11	2	0	9	12	19	−7	6	Relegation to the First Division

Source: goa-fa.com www.theindianleague.in
Rules for classification: 1) points; 2) goal difference; 3) number of goals scored
