= 2013–14 Goa Professional League =

Goa Professional League
- Season: 2013–14
- Champions: Sporting Goa; 2nd GPL title 2nd Goan title
- Relegated: Margao SC
- Matches: 65
- Goals: 236 (3.63 per match)
- Top goalscorer: Melwin Fernandes (Wilred Leisure) (13 goals)
- Biggest home win: Sporting Goa 11-1 Margao SC (8 August 2013) Churchill Brothers 8-0 Margao SC (4 September 2013)
- Biggest away win: Margao SC 0-12 Wilred Leisure (19 October 2013)
- Highest scoring: Margao SC 0-12 Wilred Leisure (19 October 2013)
- Longest winning run: 6 games Sporting Goa
- Longest unbeaten run: 9 games Sporting Goa; Churchill Brothers
- Longest losing run: 13 games Margao SC

The 2013–14 Goa Professional League (also known as the Airtel Goa Pro League for sponsorship reasons) is the 16th season of top-tier football in the Indian state of Goa. It began on 5 August 2013. Salgaocar are the defending champions.

On 20 November 2013, Sporting Clube de Goa were crowned champions after Churchill Brothers failed to report for final round encounter, the title decider against Sporting Clube de Goa, at Duler Stadium, Mapusa.

Sporting Clube reported at the venue as per the fixture and gained a walkover, hence being crowned the champions. The Goa Football Association made no changes to its fixtures even though Churchill Brothers had requested for postponement to the match, citing their I-League engagement against Mohammedan on 24 November 2013.

== Teams ==
Team	City/Town
Churchill Brothers	Salcete
Dempo	Panaji
Goa Velha	Old Goa
Laxmi Prasad	Mapusa
Margao	Margao
Salgaocar	Vasco da Gama
Santa Cruz Club of Cavelossim	Cavelossim
SESA Football Academy	Sanquelim
Sporting Clube de Goa	Panaji
Wilred Leisure	Curtorim

== Table ==
Pos	Team	Pld	W	D	L	GF	GA	GD	Pts	Qualification or relegation
1	Sporting Goa (C)	13	9	3	1	33	9	+24	30	Champions
2	Churchill Brothers	13	8	2	3	31	15	+16	26	
3	Dempo	13	7	4	2	22	8	+14	25	
4	Salgaocar	13	6	5	2	33	9	+24	23	
5	Laxmi Prasad	13	6	3	4	24	15	+9	21	
6	Wilred Leisure	13	5	1	7	28	22	+6	16	
7	Goa Velha	13	5	1	7	16	27	−11	16	
8	Santa Cruz	13	4	3	6	19	20	−1	15	
9	SESA FA	13	4	1	8	18	27	−9	13	
10	Margao SC	13	0	0	13	9	81	−72	0	

Updated to match(es) played on 22 May 2014. Source: Goa Bola
Rules for classification: 1) points; 2) goal difference; 3) number of goals scored.
(C) Champions

== Top scorers ==
Rank	Player	Team	Goals
1	(India) Melwin Fernandes	Wilred Leisure	13
2	(Australia) Boima Karpeh	Sporting Goa	12
3	(India) Alvito Miranda	Laxmi Prasad	10
4	(India) Jaison Vales	Churchill Brothers	9
4	(India) Agnelo D'souza	Santa Cruz	9
6	(Nigeria) Chukwudi Chukwuma	SESA F.A.	8
7	(India) Gilbert Oliveira	Salgaocar F.C.	7
8	(France) Claude Gnapka	Salgaocar F.C.	6
8	(India) Bineesh Balan	Churchill Brothers	6
10	(India) Angelo Colaco	Wilred Leisure	5
