= F. Lalrinpuia =

Indian footballer

F Lalrinpuia
Personal information
- Date of birth: 3 October 1989 (age 37)
- Place of birth: Mizoram, India, Republic veng
- Position: Forward

Team information
- Current team: Mizoram Police

Senior career*
Years	Team	Apps	(Gls)
2012–2015	Mizoram Police		
2015	Chanmari		
2016	Aizawl	10	(0)
2016–	Mizoram Police		
- * Club domestic league appearances and goals as of 18:40, 20 March 2018 (UTC)

F Lalrinpuia (born 3 October 1989) is an Indian professional footballer who plays as a forward for Mizoram Police in the Mizoram Premier League.

== Career ==
Born in Mizoram, Lalrinpuia began his career with Mizoram Police in the Mizoram Premier League. He then joined Chanmari, where he played for the side in the I-League 2nd Division. He also represented Mizoram in the Santosh Trophy and helped the state win their first championship in the tournament.

On 16 January 2016 Lalrinpuia made his professional debut with newly promoted I-League club, Aizawl, against Bengaluru FC. He came on as a 79th-minute substitute as Aizawl lost 1–0.

=== Mizoram Police ===
After spending the season with Aizawl, Lalrinpuia returned to Mizoram Police for the 2016–17 and 2017–18 Mizoram Premier League seasons.

Lalrinpuia was also part of the Mizoram side that participated in the Santosh Trophy in 2016, 2017, and 2018. On 20 March 2018, Lalrinpuia scored the equalizer for Mizoram in their opening match of the 2017–18 edition against Goa.

== Career statistics ==
As of 16 April 2016

Club	Season	League			League Cup		Domestic Cup		Continental		Total	
Club	Season	Division	Apps	Goals	Apps	Goals	Apps	Goals	Apps	Goals	Apps	Goals
Aizawl	2015–16	I-League	10	0	—	—	0	0	—	—	10	0
Career total			10	0	0	0	0	0	0	0	10	0
