= SC de Goa =

Indian association football club based in Goa

Sporting Goa
- Full name: Sporting Clube de Goa
- Nickname: Leáõ (The Lions)
- Short name: SCG
- Founded: 1999; 27 years ago (as Cidade de Goa)
- Ground: GMC Athletic Stadium
- Capacity: 3,000
- Owner: City of Goa
- Chairman: Peter Vaz
- Head coach: Armando Colaco
- League: I-League 2; Goa Professional League
- Website: www.sportingclubedegoa.in
Home colours	Away colours	Third colours

Sporting Clube de Goa (Portuguese pronunciation: [sɨˈpɔɾtĩ ˈkluβɨ ðɨ ˈɡo.ɐ]), otherwise referred to as Sporting CG or simply Sporting Goa, is an Indian professional football club based in Panaji, Goa. The club competes in the I-League 2, the third tier of the Indian football league system and the Goa Football League. They previously competed in the I-League, then the top domestic flight.

The club was built on the lines of Portuguese club Sporting CP and adopted a similar club crest. Sporting Clube de Goa won its first Goa Football League in 2006. Since then it has clinched the title in 2014, 2016, 2018, 2020 and 2021.

Sporting Goa is the only club to have won the Super Cup without winning the league or Federation Cup. The club pulled out of 2016–17 I-League, citing AIFF bias against some clubs.

== History ==
=== Origins ===
Until the end of the Portuguese rule of Goa in 1961, a sports and recreational club named "Sporting Clube de Goa" existed, which in 1951 became branch number 114 of Sporting Clube de Portugal. The original Sporting Clube de Goa were once football champions of Portuguese India.

The present Sporting CG, nicknamed "The Flaming Orange", was founded in 1999 as Cidade de Goa. "Cidade de Goa" (transl. City of Goa; the original name for Panaji) was purchased by Sporting CG's former owner Peter Vaz later and it was renamed Sporting Clube de Goa in 1999.

=== Formation and journey: 1999–2010 ===
The club as a professional football club, came into existence in 1999, when the residents of Panjim decided the launch of a football club after "Cidade dé Goa" (a local club) disbanded its football team. Thus, after Vasco Sports Club, Sporting became the second club of public shareholding in Goa. The club, built on the lines of Portuguese club Sporting Clube de Portugal, has made rapid strides in the national circuit. Sporting shot to prominence with an impressive performance in the 2001–02 Federation Cup, the team made it to the last four after victories over stronger teams like East Bengal FC and Indian Bank Recreational Club.

After winning the 2002–03 National Football League II, Sporting made its debut in the 2003–04 season of National Football League. In 2004–05 NFL season, they were on the verge of winning their first league championship but lost out on the last day when Dempo pipped them to the title. Their season was marred by a horrific bus accident that ruled out 4 key players for the whole season while several others were injured. However, led by Nigerian import Dudu Omagbemi, they managed to complete their matches in a very short period after being given a few weeks off so that their players could recover, and heroically came second ahead of traditional powerhouses East Bengal, Mohun Bagan, Salgaocar and Mahindra United. Sporting entered into the finals of 2005 Federation Cup, but finished as the runner-up.

In 2005, Sporting missed the Durand Cup title by a whisker when the Army XI produced an upset to win. In the 2006 edition of Federation Cup, they reached the finals once again, but lost in penalty shoot-out to Mohun Bagan AC. In 2008, Sporting Goa took part in E. K. Nayanar Gold Cup, played a 0–0 draw with Brazilian side Associação Ferroviária de Esportes in group stages. The club achieved third place in the 2008–09 I-League.

=== Later years: 2010–present ===
After getting relegated from the I-League in 2010, they participated in the 2011 I-League 2nd Division and won promotion by finishing in 2nd place. At the final of 2013–14 Indian Federation Cup, Churchill Brothers defeated Sporting Goa by 3–1. In 2016, they again progressed to the semi-finals, until being beaten by Aizawl. In June 2020, Sporting Goa enjoyed an international transfer when club's Indian forward Shanon Viegas signed with Portuguese AF Lisboa 2ª Divisão Série side C.D. Olivais e Moscavide for a long-term deal.

In the 2020–21 Goa Professional League, (Note: Sporting Clube de Goa and Churchill Brothers were declared joint winners of Goa Pro League as the 13 remaining games could not be played due to the COVID-19 pandemic.) Sporting Clube de Goa emerged champions after recording a comprehensive 9–0 win over Guardian Angel in the final league match at Chowgule ground, but was not selected for I-League Second Division. Their futsal section won the GFA State Futsal Championship, earning a place in AIFF Futsal Club Championship. In the 2021–22 season, Sporting Goa finished as runners-up, finishing behind Dempo. In August 2022, legendary Goan manager Armando Colaco was appointed as new head coach by the club on a three-year deal. The club reached final of GFA Charity Cup in 2023. In August 2023, Sporting Goa was granted an I-League 3 spot to participate in the inaugural edition. In that edition, the club crowned champions with superior head-to-head record against Dempo and Sporting Bengaluru in play-offs, securing promotion to the I-League 2. In 2023–24 I-League 2, the club ended their campaign achieving fifth place with 19 points in 14 matches. In May, Sporting Goa clinched their seventh Goa Professional League title.

In June 2024, SCG appointed Savio Medeira as new technical director. The club took part in 2024 Bhausaheb Bandodkar Memorial Trophy, in which foreign teams Brisbane Roar and Defensa y Justicia participated. They suffered a 2–0 defeat to Brisbane Roar on 30 August. In 2024–25 season, the club competed in I-League 2. Sporting Goa clinched the 2024–25 Goa Professional League title in May, securing 46 points and 15 wins.

== Club crest and kits ==
=== Crest ===
The crest of Sporting Clube de Goa is predominantly a replica of the former crest of Sporting CP, which was in use by the Portuguese club from 1945 until 2001. One notable difference is that on Sporting Portugal's current crest it says "Sporting Portugal", while Sporting Goa's does not because Sporting CP's old crest, used by Sporting Goa, didn't have any word on it. Another difference is that Sporting Portugal's current crest is mostly dark green and yellow while Sporting Goa's is dark green and white just like the previous iteration of Sporting Portugal's crest in use until 2001 by the Portuguese sports club.

While the crest of Sporting Goa is coloured in green and white, the official club colours are orange and white. The club's nickname is "Flaming Orange".

=== Kit manufacturers and shirt sponsors ===
Period	Kit manufacturer	Shirt sponsor
2011–2012	Adidas	Models Construction Private Limited
2012–2015	Seventy Sports	Models Construction Private Limited
2018–2024		Models Construction Private Limited
2024–	SIX5SIX	Models Construction Private Limited

== Ownership ==
The club was modeled on the Portuguese giants Sporting Clube de Portugal and has adopted a similar club crest. The club was founded as Cidade de Goa and was taken over by entrepreneurs Peter Vaz and Edgar Afonso. Later, they renamed it Sporting Clube de Goa in 1999.

== Stadium ==
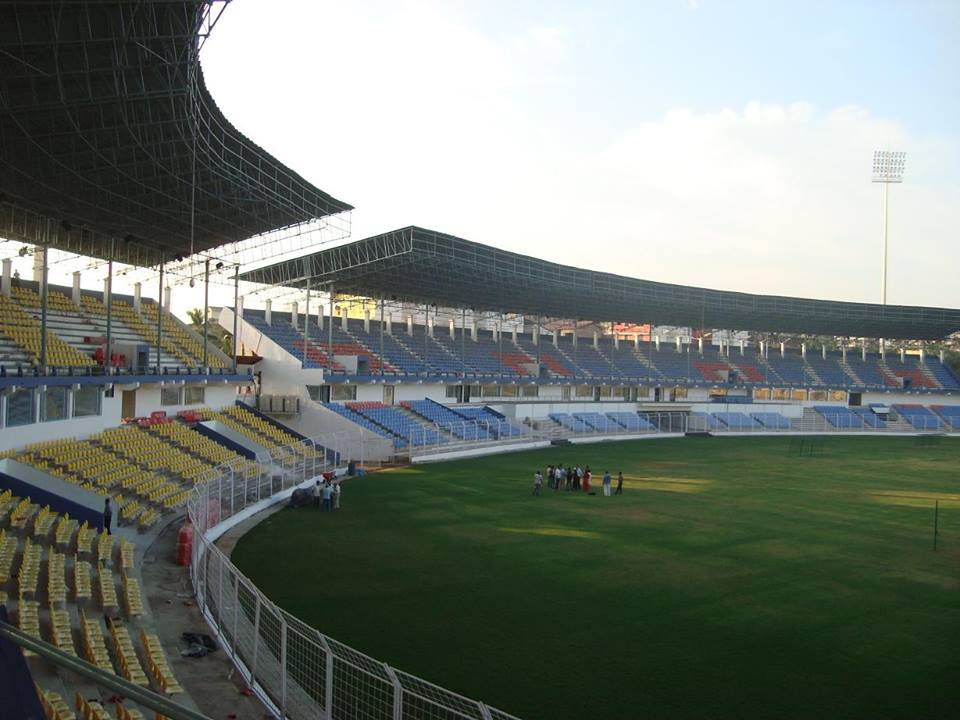
South side of Fatorda Stadium

Traditionally, Sporting Goa played at the Fatorda Stadium in Margao. During the 2011 I-League 2nd Division. However, they had to play at Jawaharlal Nehru Stadium in Shillong as the league did not have a home-and-away format. As SC Goa was back in the top-tier, they started to play home games at the Fatorda Stadium.

Goa Football Association owned Duler Stadium in Mapusa became the home ground of Sporting during the 2012–13 I-League, alongside Tilak Maidan Stadium (from January). They also used Duler during the 2013–14 I-League. In Goa, it became the second stadium to get artificial turf, in 2012. In January 2024, the club again moved to Tilak Maidan Stadium ahead of the I-League 2 season kick-off. In 2025, they decided to use GMC Athletic Stadium and Ella Academy Ground as home stadiums.

== Rivalries ==
In the land of Portuguese heritage, Sporting Clube de Goa has rivalries with their fellow Goan sides; Dempo, Churchill Brothers and Salgaocar, whom they faced in I-League and face in Goa Professional League. The club previously had a rivalry with another Goan side Pax of Nagoa.

== SCG Academy, youth and infrastructure ==
=== Overview ===
On 16 August 2013, Sporting launched their football academy on the occasion of the 198th anniversary of the founding of Don Bosco. The academy for various age groups, namely U-10, U-12, U-14, U-16, U-18, and U-20, with the coaching team built around Spanish coach Javier Fernández, assisted by Norbert Gonsalves, Ashwin Crasto, Francisco Raposo and Freddy Gomes. They worked under the overall supervision and guidance of Sporting's then head coach Oscar Bruzon, in order to implement the Sporting Clube de Goa youth development plan. Sporting Goa also renovated the football ground at Don Bosco College in Panaji with the installation of sub-surface slit drainage combined with the laying of perforated pipes. The original mud topping has given way to a sand-based top layer, which encourages drainage and healthy grass growth, and provides a level and cushioned playing surface. Between 2013 and 2015, Spanish coach Javier Fernández Cabrera worked as technical director, as well as assistant coach of the club, playing key role behind Sporting Goa's youth development.

=== Academy honours ===
- I-League U19
  - Champions (1): 2010
  - Runners-up (1): 2008
- Taça Goa U18 League
  - Champions (1): 2017
- Taça Goa U20 League
  - Champions (1): 2018

== In the community ==
Sporting Clube de Goa launched its mascot named "Zumba" (the first live mascot introduced in the league). besides its theme song "Flaming Orange", composed by one of Goa's leading bands, Sky High With Pomp.

== Players ==
=== First-team players ===
As of 28 December 2024

Note: Flags indicate national team as defined under FIFA eligibility rules; some limited exceptions apply. Players may hold more than one non-FIFA nationality.

No.	Pos.	Nation	Player
2	DF	IND	Kunal Kundaikar
3	DF	IND	Assumption Raymond Soares
4	DF	IND	Alton Vaz
5	DF	IND	Joel Colaco
6	MF	IND	Rohan Rodrigues
7	MF	IND	Sidharth Kundaikar
8	MF	IND	Lloyd Mascarenhas
9	FW	IND	Ngangbam Naocha Singh
10	FW	IND	Lloyd Cardozo
11	MF	IND	Marcus Mascarenhas (Captain)
12	MF	IND	Joyson Regan Gauncar
14	DF	IND	Dhiraj Chouhan
15	MF	IND	Samuel Gregorio Costa
16	MF	IND	Doyal Alves
17	MF	IND	Flagan Rodrigues

No.	Pos.	Nation	Player
19	FW	IND	Dattaraj Gaonkar
21	GK	IND	Abhimanyu Singh
22	MF	IND	Chandan Gawas
23	MF	IND	Biswa Darjee
24	MF	IND	Ivon Costa
26	DF	IND	Brandon Gomes
30	GK	IND	Bhaskar Jalmi
32	FW	IND	Mark Carvalho
33	FW	IND	Shelton Nickson
34	DF	IND	Joyson Pelagius Coutinho
35	DF	IND	Sushil Meitei Ahongshangbam
36	FW	IND	Akeraj Martins
40	GK	IND	Vipin Sharma
47	DF	IND	Klusner John Manuel Pereira
49	FW	IND	Liston Cardozo
99		IND	Jerry Pulamte

== Honours ==
=== League ===
- I-League
  - Runners-up (1): 2004–05
  - Third place (1): 2008–09
- National Football League II
  - Champions (1): 2002–03
- I-League 2
  - Runners-up (1): 2010–11
  - Third place (1): 2024–25
- I-League 3
  - Champions (1): 2023–24
- Goa Football League
  - Champions (9): 2006–07, 2013–14, 2015–16, 2017–18, 2019–20 (shared), 2020–21, 2023–24, 2024–25, 2024–25
  - Runners-up (3): 2016–17, 2021–22, 2022–23

=== Cup ===
- Indian Super Cup
  - Champions (1): 2005
- Federation Cup
  - Runners-up (3): 2005, 2006, 2013–14
- Durand Cup
  - Runners-up (1): 2005
- Goa Governor's Cup
  - Champions (2): 2005, 2007–08
  - Runners-up (1): 2003
- Goa Police Cup
  - Champions (1): 2018
  - Runners-up (3): 2005, 2010, 2019

=== Others ===
- AWES Cup
  - Champions (1): 2018
- GFA Charity Cup
  - Champions (1): 2018
  - Runners-up (2): 2021, 2023
- SCG Goodwill Cup
  - Champions (1): 2015
- Guru Gobind Singh Trophy
  - Runners-up (1): 2000

== Managerial history ==
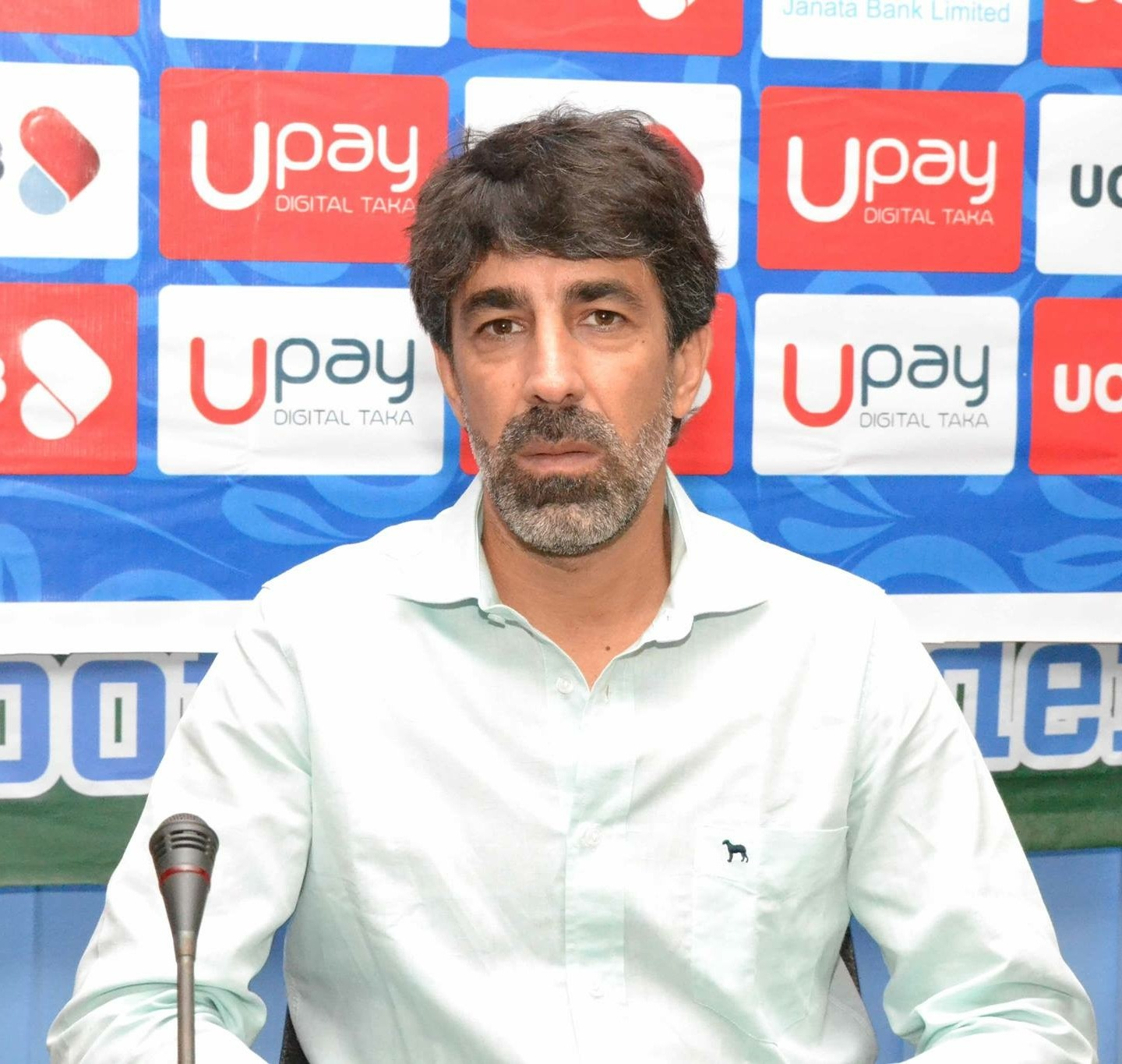
Óscar Bruzón was the first-ever Spanish coach in the club's history, clinching the 2013–14 Goa Pro League title

- (India) Alex Alvares (—2007)
- (Nigeria) Clifford Chukwuma (2007–2009)
- (India) (Portugal) Roy Barreto (2009)
- (India) Vishwas Gaonkar (2009)
- (India) Ekendra Singh (2010–2012)
- (Spain) Óscar Bruzón (2012–2014)
- (India) Mateus Costa (2014–2019)
- (India) Francisco Vaz (2019–2022)
- (India) Armando Colaco (2022–2025)
- (Spain) Fernando Santiago Varela (2025–present)

== Notable players ==
The players below, had senior/youth international cap(s) for their respective countries. Players whose name is listed represented their countries before or after playing for Sporting clube de Goa.

World Cup players

- (Trinidad and Tobago) Anthony Wolfe (2013–2014)
- (Trinidad and Tobago) Densill Theobald (2015–2016)

Other foreign internationals

- (Rwanda) Louis Aniweta (2002–2003)
- (Kenya) Nicholas Muyoti (2007–2008)
- (Kenya) Boniface Ambani (2007–2008)
- (Ghana) Lawrence Adjei (2007–2008)
- (Dominican Republic) Chad Bertrand (2010)
- (Malaysia) Stanley Bernard (2010–2011)
- (Sudan) (South Sudan) James Moga (2011)
- (Guinea) Boubacar Keita (2011–2013)
- (Liberia) Joseph Amoah (2012–2013)
- (Niger) Koffi Dan Kowa (2014–2015)
- (Trinidad and Tobago) Glenton Wolfe (2014–2015)
- (Spain) Pablo Gallardo (2014–2015)
- (Portugal) Miguel Garcia (2015) (Note: Garcia earned a Portugal national football B team cap on January 26, 2006.)
- (Syria) Mahmoud Amnah (2015–2016)

Club World Cup players

- (Spain) Ángel Berlanga (2013)

== Other departments ==
=== SCG futsal ===
Sporting Goa formed its futsal section in later years. It went on to compete in the inaugural edition of Futsal Club Championship, the top-tier futsal club competition in the country.

Honours

- Goa Futsal Championship
  - Champions (1): 2021

=== SCG hockey ===
Sporting Goa also operates women's field hockey team, that competes in the Goa Women's Hockey League, and won several editions of the tournament.

Honours

- Goa Women's Hockey League
  - Champions (2): 2014, 2015

== See also ==
- List of Goan State Football Champions
- List of football clubs in Goa
