= Rana Gharami =

Indian footballer

Personal information
- Date of birth: 6 October 1990 (age 36)
- Place of birth: Garalgachha, West Bengal, India
- Height: 1.80 m (5 ft 11 in)
- Position: Defender

Team information
- Current team: Sribhumi FC

Youth career
- Uttarpara Netaji Brigade

Senior career*
Years	Team	Apps	(Gls)
2010–2011	Peerless SC		
2011–2012	Railway FC		
2012–2013	Kalighat MS		
2013–2014	Mohun Bagan	0	(0)
2014–2015	Kalighat MS		
2015–2017	Mohammedan	25	(0)
2017–2018	Mohun Bagan	13	(0)
2018–2019	Delhi Dynamos	8	(1)
2019–2020	Odisha		
2020	Bengaluru United	4	
2020	SC East Bengal	7	(0)
- * Club domestic league appearances and goals

Rana Gharami (Bengali: রানা ঘরামি; born 6 October 1990) is an Indian professional footballer who plays as a defender.

== Career ==
=== Youth ===
Rana, resident of Garalgacha, joined a local football coaching camp where he brushed up his skills at an early age. He later joined Uttarpara Netaji Brigade. He was part of the U-21 West Bengal football team that won the Gold medal in the 2011 National Games under the coaching of Sankar Moitra.

=== Club ===
Rana joined CFL Premier Division Club Peerless in 2010, moving to CFL Super Division side Railway FC the next season. In 2012–13 season, he played for I-League 2nd Division club Kalighat Milan Sangha.

For 2013–14 season Rana signed for I-League club Mohun Bagan. He failed to get any game time with the club and rejoined Kalighat Milan Sangha at the end of the season. In mid 2015 Rana was signed by Mohammedan SC for upcoming Calcutta Football League and 2015–16 I-League 2nd Division. He had a good 2016–17 season, in which Mohammedan won 2016 Sikkim Gold Cup and finished runners–up in 2016 CFL Premier Division. Adding to that he captained the West Bengal football team which won the 2016–17 Santosh Trophy.

In June 2017 Mohammedan extended Rana's contract till end of the 2017 CFL Premier Division. At the end of 2017–18 Calcutta Premier Division, Rana was signed by Mohun Bagan for upcoming I-League. With Mohun Bagan, Rana won the Sikkim Gold Cup once again. He made his I-League debut on 10 December 2017 against Churchill Brothers coming in as substitute in place of Ansumana Kromah at 65th minute of the match.

== Awards ==
Rana received a special award from Calcutta Sports Journalists Club(CSJC) for his contributions for state team and the club in 2016–17 season at CSJC's annual awards.

== Career statistics ==
As of 31 December 2017

Club	Season	League			Federation Cup		Durand Cup		AFC		Total	
Club	Season	Div	Apps	Goals	Apps	Goals	Apps	Goals	Apps	Goals	Apps	Goals
Peerless SC	2010–11	CFL	–	–	–	–	–	–	–	–	–	–
Railway FC	2011–12	CFL	–	–	–	–	–	–	–	–	–	–
Kalighat MS	2012–13	2nd	?	?	?	?	?	?	–	–	?	?
Mohun Bagan	2013-14	1st	0	0	0	0	0	0	–	–	0	0
Kalighat MS	2014–15	CFL	–	–	–	–	–	–	–	–	–	–
Mohammedan	2015-16	2nd	?	?	–	–	–	–	–	–	?	?
Mohammedan	2016-17	2nd	5	0	–	–	–	–	–	–	5	0
Mohun Bagan	2017-18	1st	3	0	0	0	0	0	?	?	3	0
Career total			8	0	0	0	0	0	0	0	8	0

== Honours ==
=== Club ===
Mohammedan

- Sikkim Gold Cup : 2016

Mohun Bagan

- Sikkim Gold Cup : 2017

=== State ===
West Bengal

- Santosh Trophy : 2016–17

West Bengal Under–21

- National Games (Gold) : 2011
