= Sikanderpur, Punjab =

Coordinates: 31°07′41″N 76°07′08″E

Sikanderpur Sikanderpur
- village
- Interactive map of Sikanderpur
- Country: India
- State: Punjab

Population
  - Total: 2,500

Languages
  - Official: Punjabi
- Time zone: UTC+5:30 (IST)

Sikanderpur is a village in the district of Jalandhar, Punjab, India.
