= Davorlim =

- Town
- Location in Goa, India Davorlim (India)
- Coordinates: 15.25°N 73.98°E
- Country: India
- State: Goa
- District: South Goa
- Taluka: Salcete
- Elevation: 31 m (102 ft)

Population (2011)
  - Total: 15,350

Languages
  - Official: Konkani
- Time zone: UTC+5:30 (IST)
- Postal code: 403707
- Vehicle registration: GA
- Website: goa.gov.in

Davorlim is a town and suburb of city of Margao in South Goa district in the state of Goa, India.

== Geography ==
Davorlim is located at 15.25°N 73.98°E. It has an average elevation of 31 metres (102 feet).

== Demographics ==
As of 2001 census of India, Davorlim had a population of 10,923. Males constitute 52% of the population and females 48%. Davorlim has an average literacy rate of 73%, higher than the national average of 59.5%: male literacy is 78% and, female literacy is 68%. In Davorlim, 12% of the population is under 6 years of age.

Religions in Davorlim
Religion	Percent
Hindus	45.90%
Muslims	39.11%
Christians	14.68%
Others	0.30%
