= Ekendra Singh =

Indian football manager

Personal information
- Full name: Soibam Ekendra Singh
- Date of birth: 16 June 1957 (age 69)
- Place of birth: Manipur, India

Managerial career
- Years: Team
- 2010–2013: Sporting Goa
- 2014-2015: United Sikkim
- 2015–2021: Kenkre

Ekendra Singh (born 16 June 1957) is an Indian football manager who most recently managed Kenkre FC in the I-League 2nd Division. He had also managed Manipur football team in the Santosh Trophy. Currently he is coach of Oil India FC.

== Coaching career ==
=== Sporting Clube de Goa ===
In the summer of 2010 Singh signed with then I-League 2nd Division club Sporting Clube de Goa who were just relegated from the I-League after the 2009–10 season. After his first season in charge he led Sporting Goa to second place in the 2011 I-League 2nd Division final round and promotion back to the I-League.

=== Kenkre ===
On 1 January 2015, Singh was appointed as head coach of I-League 2nd Division side Kenkre, and managed the team until 31 May 2021.
