= Chandigarh football team =

Indian football team

Chandigarh
- Full name: Chandigarh football team
- Ground: Various
- Owner: Chandigarh Football Association
- Head coach: Sanjeev Kumar Maria
- League: Santosh Trophy
- 2024–25: Group stage
Home colours	Away colours

The Chandigarh football team is an Indian football team representing Chandigarh in Indian state football competitions including the Santosh Trophy.

== Current squad ==
Note: Flags indicate national team as defined under FIFA eligibility rules; some limited exceptions apply. Players may hold more than one non-FIFA nationality.

No.	Pos.	Nation	Player
1	GK	IND	Gurinder Singh
2	DF	IND	Davinder Singh
4	DF	IND	Clintu Cleetus
5	DF	IND	Sanamdeep Sanamdeep
6	MF	IND	Swamya Hardik Singh
7	MF	IND	Jipson Justus
8	FW	IND	Nasrudheen Cheriyath
9	MF	IND	Nitin Sharma
10	FW	IND	Midhun Wilwet
11	MF	IND	Harman Singh Brar

No.	Pos.	Nation	Player
14	FW	IND	Amit Kumar
15	MF	IND	Randeep Singh
18	MF	IND	Nikhil Prashar
—	FW	IND	Sampathkumar Kuttymani
—		IND	Gurinder Singh
—		IND	Krishnachhetri
—		IND	Tarun Taneja
—	MF	IND	Sohailbir Singh Sidhu
—		IND	Kartik Trikha
—		IND	Sumit Sihag

== Honours ==
=== State (youth) ===
- B.C. Roy Trophy
  - Winners (2): 2009–10, 2010–11
- Mir Iqbal Hussain Trophy
  - Runners-up (1): 2011–12
