= FC Goa (women) =

Women football club

FC Goa Women
- Full name: Football Club Goa (women)
- Nickname: The Gaurs
- Short name: Goa
- Founded: 2018; 8 years ago
- Ground: Fatorda Stadium, Margao
- Capacity: 19,000
- Owner: Goan Football Club Pvt. Ltd.
- League: Goa Women's League
- 2020–21: Runners up
- Website: http://www.fcgoa.in/
Home colours	Away colours

Futebol Clube de Goa Women is a women's football club affiliated with FC Goa. The team currently plays in the Goa Women's League, the state division of women's football in Goa.

Formed in 2018, the F.C. Goa Women's team played its inaugural season in the second edition of GFA Vedanta Women's League.

== History ==
=== Inception ===
FC Goa women's team is officially launched on 28 July 2018 became the second Indian Super League (ISL) side, after FC Pune City, to launch a women's team.

The women's side of the Goan Club was launched ahead of the second Vedanta Goa Women's Football League.

"The women's team will be built in the same image and with the same principles as the men's team. The club will work extremely hard towards developing and producing talented women footballers and hope to emulate the successful women that represented the national team from Goa in the 1970's," FC Goa Technical Director Derrick Pereira said on the official launching ceremony.

== Stadium ==
The Pandit Jawaharlal Nehru Stadium in Margao, better known as The Fatorda is the home stadium of Goa. The stadium has hosted many international games, including India national team's qualifiers for both the FIFA World Cup and AFC Asian Cup. It was also one of the six host venues for the 2017 FIFA U-17 World Cup held in India.

The stadium opened in 1989. In 2014, it has been refurbished and upgraded according to the latest FIFA specifications to host the Lusofonia Games in 2014. It is designed with a 20,000 seating capacity With a roof covering 100 percent of the seating area, the stadium complex provides two levels of fans seating arrangement along with a VIP area.

== Players ==
As of 15th January 2022

Note: Flags indicate national team as defined under FIFA eligibility rules; some limited exceptions apply. Players may hold more than one non-FIFA nationality.

No.	Pos.	Nation	Player
1	GK	IND	Josline D'Souza
4	MF	IND	Joyvi Fernandes
5	DF	IND	Neefa Clemente
6	DF	IND	Kusum Shaikh
7	DF	IND	Leena Gaunco
8	MF	IND	Pushpa Parab
9	MF	IND	Velanie Fernandes
10	DF	IND	Kimberly Fernandez
11	MF	IND	Vailanka Souza
12	FW	IND	Arpita Yeshwant Pednekar
13	MF	IND	Alisha Tavares
14	GK	IND	Prithi Kesrakar
16	FW	IND	Namita Govekar
17	DF	IND	Snehal Morajkar

No.	Pos.	Nation	Player
19	FW	IND	Sushmita Jadhav
21	MF	IND	Atiriya Narayan Ardikey
22	DF	IND	Khushboo Saundatikar
23	FW	IND	Meloshka Carvalho
26	MF	IND	Ansiva Vaz
28	MF	IND	Gail Avril Fernandes

== Records ==
Season	Goa Women's League	Other
2018	Runners-up	–
2018	DNP	–
2021	Runners-up	–

== Honours ==
- Goa Women's League
  - Runners-up (2): 2018, 2021
