= 2025–26 Santosh Trophy =

Senior Men's National Football Championship

Tournament details
- Country: India
- Venues: 9 (in 9 host cities): Group stage: Various; Finals: Dhakuakhana, Dhemaji, Assam
- Dates: 15 December 2025 – 8 February 2026
- Teams: 38

Final positions
- Champions: Services (8th title)
- Runners-up: Kerala

Tournament statistics
- Matches played: 88
- Goals scored: 250 (2.84 per match)
- Top goal scorer: Himanshu Jangra (9 goals)

The 2025–26 Santosh Trophy was the 79th edition of the Santosh Trophy, the premier competition in India for senior men's football teams representing their respective states/union territories and government institutions.

== Venues ==
The All India Football Federation (AIFF) announced in November 2025 that the group stage matches would begin the following month and would be played in nine venues. The venues and the corresponding groups that would play there were named. Hosts Assam and last year's finalists, West Bengal and Kerala were exempted from playing the group stage fixtures. Assam is hosting the event after 15 years.

Group	City	Stadium	Capacity
A	Mahilpur	Mahilpur Stadium	10,000
B	Greater Noida	Sharda University Stadium	–
C	Ranchi	Birsa Munda Football Stadium	40,000
D	Agartala	Umakanta Mini Stadium	5,000
E	Shillong	SSA Football Stadium	15,100
F	Narayanpur	RKM Sports Complex	1,000
G	Anantapur	RDT Stadium	5,000
H	Bengaluru	Bangalore Football Stadium	–
I	Jaipur	Vidyadhar Nagar Stadium	–
Final round	Dhakuakhana & Dhemaji	Dhakuakhana Football Stadium & Silapathar Football Stadium	
Knockouts	Dhakuakhana & Dhemaji	Dhakuakhana Football Stadium & Silapathar Football Stadium	

== Draws ==
38 teams entered the competition; West Bengal and Kerala, the finalists of the previous edition and Assam, the hosts received direct entry to the final round. The remaining 35 teams were divided into 1 group of 3 teams and 8 groups of 4 teams each. It was announced that the winners of each group would make the final round.

== Group stage ==
=== Group A ===
Pos	Team	Pld	W	D	L	GF	GA	GD	Pts	Qualification	PB	JK	LA	HP
1	Punjab (H)	3	3	0	0	10	0	+10	9	Final round		1–0		
2	Jammu and Kashmir	3	2	0	1	6	1	+5	6				3–0	
3	Ladakh	3	1	0	2	1	6	−5	3		0–3			1–0
4	Himachal Pradesh	3	0	0	3	0	10	−10	0		0–6	0–3		

Source: AIFF
Rules for classification: 1) points; 2) head-to-head points; 3) head-to-head goal difference; 4) goal difference; 5) number of goals scored; 6) drawing of lots
(H) Hosts

=== Group B ===
Pos	Team	Pld	W	D	L	GF	GA	GD	Pts	Qualification	UK	HR	CH	UP
1	Uttarakhand	3	3	0	0	5	0	+5	9	Final round			1–0	2–0
2	Haryana	3	1	1	1	3	3	0	4		0–2			
3	Chandigarh	3	1	0	2	1	3	−2	3			0–2		1–0
4	Uttar Pradesh (H)	3	0	1	2	1	4	−3	1			1–1		

Source: AIFF
Rules for classification: 1) points; 2) head-to-head points; 3) head-to-head goal difference; 4) goal difference; 5) number of goals scored; 6) drawing of lots
(H) Hosts

=== Group C ===
Pos	Team	Pld	W	D	L	GF	GA	GD	Pts	Qualification	RL	DL	JH	BR
1	Railways	3	2	1	0	13	0	+13	7	Final round			6–0	
2	Delhi (H)	3	2	1	0	10	1	+9	7		0–0			2–0
3	Jharkhand	3	1	0	2	2	14	−12	3			1–8		
4	Bihar	3	0	0	3	0	10	−10	0		0–7		0–1	

Source: AIFF
Rules for classification: 1) points; 2) head-to-head points; 3) head-to-head goal difference; 4) goal difference; 5) number of goals scored; 6) drawing of lots
(H) Hosts

=== Group D ===
Pos	Team	Pld	W	D	L	GF	GA	GD	Pts	Qualification	NL	MN	MZ	TR
1	Nagaland	3	2	1	0	5	1	+4	7	Final round		3–0		1–1
2	Manipur	3	2	0	1	8	5	+3	6				3–1	5–1
3	Mizoram	3	1	0	2	2	4	−2	3		0–1			
4	Tripura (H)	3	0	1	2	2	7	−5	1				0–1	

Source: AIFF
Rules for classification: 1) points; 2) head-to-head points; 3) head-to-head goal difference; 4) goal difference; 5) number of goals scored; 6) drawing of lots
(H) Hosts

=== Group E ===
Pos	Team	Pld	W	D	L	GF	GA	GD	Pts	Qualification	ML	SK	AR
1	Meghalaya (H)	2	1	0	1	3	3	0	3	Final round		1–2	
2	Sikkim	2	1	0	1	2	2	0	3				0–1
3	Arunachal Pradesh	2	1	0	1	2	2	0	3		1–2		

Source: AIFF
Rules for classification: 1) points; 2) head-to-head points; 3) head-to-head goal difference; 4) goal difference; 5) number of goals scored; 6) drawing of lots
(H) Hosts

=== Group F ===
Pos	Team	Pld	W	D	L	GF	GA	GD	Pts	Qualification	OD	TG	CG	MP
1	Odisha	3	3	0	0	8	1	+7	9	Final round				4–0
2	Telangana	3	2	0	1	6	2	+4	6		0–1			
3	Chhattisgarh (H)	3	1	0	2	5	5	0	3		1–3	1–2		
4	Madhya Pradesh	3	0	0	3	0	11	−11	0			0–4	0–3	

Source: AIFF
Rules for classification: 1) points; 2) head-to-head points; 3) head-to-head goal difference; 4) goal difference; 5) number of goals scored; 6) drawing of lots
(H) Hosts

=== Group G ===
Pos	Team	Pld	W	D	L	GF	GA	GD	Pts	Qualification	TN	PY	AP	AN
1	Tamil Nadu	3	3	0	0	14	0	+14	9	Final round			5–0	
2	Pondicherry	3	2	0	1	5	5	0	6		0–3		2–1	
3	Andhra Pradesh (H)	3	1	0	2	2	8	−6	3			1–3		
4	Andaman & Nicobar	3	0	0	3	1	9	−8	0		0–6		0–1	

Source: AIFF
Rules for classification: 1) points; 2) head-to-head points; 3) head-to-head goal difference; 4) goal difference; 5) number of goals scored; 6) drawing of lots
(H) Hosts

=== Group H ===
Pos	Team	Pld	W	D	L	GF	GA	GD	Pts	Qualification	SE	GA	KA	LD
1	Services	3	3	0	0	8	2	+6	9	Final round			2–1	
2	Goa (H)	3	1	1	1	3	5	−2	4		0–4		2–0	
3	Karnataka	3	1	0	2	4	4	0	3					3–0
4	Lakshadweep	3	0	1	2	2	6	−4	1		1–2	1–1		

Source: AIFF
Rules for classification: 1) points; 2) head-to-head points; 3) head-to-head goal difference; 4) goal difference; 5) number of goals scored; 6) drawing of lots
(H) Hosts

=== Group I ===
Pos	Team	Pld	W	D	L	GF	GA	GD	Pts	Qualification	RJ	GJ	MH	DD
1	Rajasthan (H)	3	2	1	0	10	1	+9	7	Final round		1–1		
2	Gujarat	3	2	1	0	9	1	+8	7				3–0	
3	Maharashtra	3	1	0	2	4	6	−2	3		0–3			4–0
4	DNHDD	3	0	0	3	0	15	−15	0		6–0	0–5		

Source: AIFF
Rules for classification: 1) points; 2) head-to-head points; 3) head-to-head goal difference; 4) goal difference; 5) number of goals scored; 6) drawing of lots
(H) Hosts

== Final round ==
=== Qualified teams ===
Direct entrants (3)
Hosts	Assam
Defending champions	West Bengal
Previous runners-up	Kerala

Group	Group winners (9)
A	Punjab
B	Uttarakhand
C	Railways
D	Nagaland
E	Meghalaya
F	Odisha
G	Tamil Nadu
H	Services
I	Rajasthan

=== Group A ===
Pos	Team	Pld	W	D	L	GF	GA	GD	Pts	Qualification	WB	TN	RJ	AS	UK	NL
1	West Bengal	5	3	2	0	8	2	+6	11	Advanced to knockout stage		1–1	1–0		1–0	4–0
2	Tamil Nadu	5	3	1	1	6	2	+4	10	Advanced to knockout stage						
3	Rajasthan	5	2	1	2	6	8	−2	7	Advanced to knockout stage		1–0				
4	Assam (H)	5	1	3	1	8	6	+2	6	Advanced to knockout stage	1–1	0–1	3–2		1–1	3–3
5	Uttarakhand	5	1	1	3	5	7	−2	4			0–1	2–3			
6	Nagaland	5	0	2	3	6	14	−8	2			0–3	2–2		1–2	

Source: AIFF
Rules for classification: 1) points; 2) head-to-head points; 3) head-to-head goal difference; 4) goal difference; 5) number of goals scored; 6) drawing of lots
(H) Hosts

=== Group B ===
Pos	Team	Pld	W	D	L	GF	GA	GD	Pts		KL	RL	PB	SE	ML	OD
1	Kerala	5	3	1	1	8	3	+5	10	Advanced to knockout stage			3–1		3–0	1–0
2	Railways	5	1	4	0	7	5	+2	7	Advanced to knockout stage	1–1		2–0	1–1	2–2	
3	Punjab	5	2	1	2	10	10	0	7	Advanced to knockout stage					3–3	5–2
4	Services	5	1	3	1	4	4	0	6	Advanced to knockout stage	1–0		0–1		2–2	0–0
5	Meghalaya	5	1	3	1	8	10	−2	6							1–0
6	Odisha	5	0	2	3	3	8	−5	2			1–1				

Source: AIFF
Rules for classification: 1) points; 2) head-to-head points; 3) head-to-head goal difference; 4) goal difference; 5) number of goals scored; 6) drawing of lots

== Knockout stage ==
=== Bracket ===
Quarter-finals
3 February – Dhakuakhana
West Bengal	0 (2)
Services (p)	0 (3)
3 February – Dhakuakhana
Railways	2
Rajasthan	0
3 February – Dhemaji
Kerala	3
Assam	0
3 February – Dhemaji
Tamil Nadu	1 (1)
Punjab (p)	1 (4)

Semi-finals
5 February – Dhemaji
Services	2
Railways	0
5 February – Dhakuakhana
Kerala	4
Punjab	0

Final
8 February – Dhakuakhana
Services (a.e.t.)	1
Kerala	0

=== Quarter-finals ===
3 February 2026	Railways	2–0	Rajasthan	Dhakuakhana, Assam
09:00 IST	S. Bhanwala 78'; Johnson Joseph Mathews 83'	Report		Stadium: Dhakuakhana Football Stadium; Attendance: 250; Referee: I Jamal Mohamed; Player of the Match: Johnson Joseph Mathews (Railways)

3 February 2026	Tamil Nadu	1–1 (a.e.t.) (1–4 p)	Punjab	Dhemaji, Assam
09:00 IST	M Umasankar 78'	Report	Jatinder Singh Rana 37'	Stadium: Silapathar Football Stadium; Attendance: 800; Referee: Lakshay; Player of the Match: Karandeep Singh (Punjab)
	Penalties
	Henry Joseph Immanuel (penalty missed); M Umasankar (penalty scored); VK Velmurugan (penalty missed)		(penalty scored) Akashdeep Singh; (penalty scored) Harjit; (penalty scored) Akashmaan Chaudhary; (penalty scored) Jagdeep Singh

3 February 2026	West Bengal	0–0 (a.e.t.) (2–3 p)	Services	Dhakuakhana, Assam
14:00 IST		Report		Stadium: Dhakuakhana Football Stadium; Attendance: 2,000; Referee: Jehrul Islam; Player of the Match: Gagandeep Singh (Services)
	Penalties
	Chaku Mandi (penalty missed); Karan Rai (penalty missed); Shyamal Besra (penalty scored); R. Hansda (penalty scored); H. Shrestha (penalty missed)		(penalty scored) Samuel K Vanlalpeka; (penalty missed) Wangden Tamang; (penalty scored) Vijay Marandi; (penalty missed) Vijay J; (penalty scored) Abhishek Pawar

3 February 2026	Kerala	3–0	Assam	Dhemaji, Assam
14:00 IST	Manoj M 17'; Ajsal 44'; Aboobacker Dilshad 90+4'	Report		Stadium: Silapathar Football Stadium; Attendance: 2,200; Referee: Jarvish Macwan; Player of the Match: Manoj M (Kerala)

=== Semi-finals ===
5 February 2026	Kerala	4–0	Punjab	Dhakuakhana, Assam
13:30 IST	Ajsal 15'; Muhammed Riyas 33', 83'; Viknesh Mariya 45'	Report		Stadium: Dhakuakhana Football Stadium; Attendance: 3,500; Referee: Aditya Purkayahtha; Player of the Match: Muhammed Riyas (Kerala)

5 February 2026	Services	2–0	Railways	Dhemaji, Assam
13:30 IST	Abhishek Pawar 33', 73'	Report		Stadium: Silapathar Football Stadium; Attendance: 500; Referee: Ashwin; Player of the Match: Abhishek Pawar (Services)

=== Final ===
8 February 2026	Services	1–0 (a.e.t.)	Kerala	Dhakuakhana, Assam
13:00 IST	Abhishek Pawar 109'	Report		Stadium: Dhakuakhana Football Stadium; Attendance: 4,500; Referee: Jehrul Islam; Player of the Match: Abhishek Pawar (Services)

== Statistics ==
Rank	Player	Team	Goal(s)
1	Himanshu Jangra	Delhi	9
2	Abhishek Pawar	Services	7
3	Nirmal Singh Bisht	Delhi	6
4	Mukesh Kumar	Rajasthan	6
5	Devadath S	Tamil Nadu	6
Source: AIFF

== Awards ==
The following awards were given out at the end of the tournament: the top scorer, Best Goalkeeper, Player of the Tournament and Fair Play Award.

Award	Player	Team
Top Scorer		
Best Goalkeeper		
Player of the Tournament		
Fair Play Award		

== Broadcasting ==
Territory	Broadcaster(s)	Ref.
India	YouTube	
India	FIFA+	
(United Nations) Global	FIFA+	

== See also ==
- 2025–26 Rajmata Jijabai Trophy
