= 2023–24 Santosh Trophy =

Senior Men's National Football Championship

Tournament details
- Country: India
- Venues: 10 (in 8 host cities): Group stage: Various; Finals: Yupia, Arunachal Pradesh
- Dates: 8 October 2023 – 9 March 2024
- Teams: 38

Final positions
- Champions: Services (7th title)
- Runners-up: Goa

Tournament statistics
- Matches played: 122
- Top goal scorer(s): Phijam Sanathoi Meitei (Manipur; 9 goals)

Awards
- Best player: Samir Murmu (Services)
- Best goalkeeper: Sayad bin Abdul Kadir (Services)

The 2023–24 Santosh Trophy was the 77th edition of the Santosh Trophy, the premier competition in India for senior men's football teams representing their respective states/union territories and government institutions.

This edition onwards the tournament was to be held under the name of FIFA Santosh Trophy, but FIFA pulled out due to the choice of venue and thus likely to associate from the next season.

== Venues ==
The All India Football Federation (AIFF) announced in September 2023 that the group stage matches would begin the following month and would be played in six venues. The venues and the corresponding groups that would play there were named. Hosts Arunachal Pradesh were exempted from playing the group stage fixtures. For the final round, Arunachal Pradesh was named the host, the first time that a Northeast Indian State would host in the tournament's history.

Group	City	Stadium	Capacity
Group A	Benaulim	SAG Benaulim Football Ground	–
Group B	Banga	PT Mehnga Singh Stadium	1,500
Group C	Noida	Vijay Singh Pathik Stadium	8,000
Group C	Noida	Bennett University Ground	–
Group D	Kokrajhar	SAI STC	10,000
Group D	Kokrajhar	KDSA Ground	–
Group E	Phagwara	Sri Hargobind Stadium	2,000
Group E	Amritsar	GNDU Sports Complex	–
Group F	Kolhapur	Chhatrapati Shahu Stadium	18,000
Final round	Yupia	Golden Jubilee Stadium	15,000
Knockouts	Yupia	Golden Jubilee Stadium	15,000

== Draws ==
The draw for the group stage fixtures was held at the Football House in New Delhi on 26 July 2023. 38 teams entered the competition; Karnataka and Meghalaya, the finalists of the previous edition, received direct entry to the final round. Hosts Arunachal Pradesh were placed in Group A of the final round. The remaining 35 teams were divided into one group of five teams and five groups of six teams each. It was announced that the winners of each group and four best second-placed teams, along with finalists from the previous edition would make the final round.

The draw for the final round was held on 30 November 2023.

== Group stage ==
=== Group A ===
Pos	Team	Pld	W	D	L	GF	GA	GD	Pts	Qualification	GA	KL	GU	JK	CH
1	Goa (H)	4	3	1	0	5	2	+3	10	Final round			1–1	2–1	
2	Kerala	4	3	0	1	12	2	+10	9	Final round	0–1			6–1	
3	Gujarat	4	2	1	1	7	5	+2	7			0–3			4–0
4	Jammu and Kashmir	4	1	0	3	4	10	−6	3				1–2		1–0
5	Chhattisgarh	4	0	0	4	0	9	−9	0		0–1	0–3			

Source: AIFF
Rules for classification: 1) points; 2) head-to-head points; 3) head-to-head goal difference; 4) goal difference; 5) number of goals scored; 6) drawing of lots
(H) Hosts

=== Group B ===
Pos	Team	Pld	W	D	L	GF	GA	GD	Pts	Qualification	DL	PB	OD	WB	LD	HR
1	Delhi	5	4	1	0	6	1	+5	13	Final round				0–0	3–1	
2	Punjab (H)	5	3	0	2	9	2	+7	9		0–1				4–0	2–0
3	Odisha	5	3	0	2	8	3	+5	9		0–1	1–0		0–2		
4	West Bengal	5	2	2	1	7	3	+4	8			0–3				0–0
5	Ladakh	5	1	0	4	2	17	−15	3				0–5	0–5		
6	Haryana	5	0	1	4	0	6	−6	1		0–1		0–2		0–1	

Source: AIFF
Rules for classification: 1) points; 2) head-to-head points; 3) head-to-head goal difference; 4) goal difference; 5) number of goals scored; 6) drawing of lots
(H) Hosts

=== Group C ===
Pos	Team	Pld	W	D	L	GF	GA	GD	Pts	Qualification	MN	UP	TN	NL	MP	JH
1	Manipur	5	5	0	0	21	4	+17	15	Final round		6–2		6–2		3–0
2	Uttar Pradesh (H)	5	4	0	1	12	9	+3	12				2–0		4–1	
3	Tamil Nadu	5	2	1	2	13	5	+8	7		0–1			1–1	4–0	
4	Nagaland	5	2	1	2	13	9	+4	7		3–0	1–2				
5	Madhya Pradesh	5	0	1	4	1	16	−15	1		0–5					0–0
6	Jharkhand	5	0	1	4	2	19	−17	1			1–2	1–8	0–6		

Source: AIFF
Rules for classification: 1) points; 2) head-to-head points; 3) head-to-head goal difference; 4) goal difference; 5) number of goals scored; 6) drawing of lots
(H) Hosts

=== Group D ===
Pos	Team	Pld	W	D	L	GF	GA	GD	Pts	Qualification	AS	RW	CH	HP	RJ	BR
1	Assam (H)	5	5	0	0	20	0	+20	15	Final round			2–0	7–0		
2	Railways	5	4	0	1	13	2	+11	12	Final round	0–1		2–0		6–0	1–0
3	Chandigarh	5	3	0	2	6	5	+1	9			0–2		2–1	2–0	
4	Himachal Pradesh	5	1	1	3	6	16	−10	4			1–4				1–0
5	Rajasthan	5	1	1	3	6	17	−11	4		0–5			3–3		
6	Bihar	5	0	0	5	1	12	−11	0		0–5		0–2		1–3	

Source: AIFF
Rules for classification: 1) points; 2) head-to-head points; 3) head-to-head goal difference; 4) goal difference; 5) number of goals scored; 6) drawing of lots
(H) Hosts

=== Group E ===
Pos	Team	Pld	W	D	L	GF	GA	GD	Pts	Qualification	SE	MZ	UT	PY	SK	DD
1	Services	5	5	0	0	21	3	+18	15	Final round			4–1	6–0	3–0	
2	Mizoram	5	4	0	1	14	2	+12	12	Final round	1–2			6–0		5–0
3	Uttarakhand	5	3	0	2	11	6	+5	9			0–1		7–1	1–0	
4	Pondicherry	5	1	1	3	4	21	−17	4		2–1				2–1	1–1
5	Sikkim	5	1	0	4	3	8	−5	3			0–1				2–1
6	DNHDD	5	0	1	4	3	16	−13	1		1–6		0–2			

Source: AIFF
Rules for classification: 1) points; 2) head-to-head points; 3) head-to-head goal difference; 4) goal difference; 5) number of goals scored; 6) drawing of lots

=== Group F ===
Pos	Team	Pld	W	D	L	GF	GA	GD	Pts	Qualification	MA	TG	LK	TR	AN	AP
1	Maharashtra (H)	5	5	0	0	24	1	+23	15	Final round		3–0	4–0			6–0
2	Telangana	5	2	2	1	8	3	+5	8				0–0		7–0	0–0
3	Lakshadweep	5	2	2	1	7	6	+1	8					2–2	1–0	
4	Tripura	5	1	2	2	4	6	−2	5		1–3	0–1				
5	Andaman and Nicobar	5	1	1	3	3	16	−13	4		0–8			0–0		3–0
6	Andhra Pradesh	5	0	1	4	0	14	−14	1				0–4	0–1		

Source: AIFF
Rules for classification: 1) points; 2) head-to-head points; 3) head-to-head goal difference; 4) goal difference; 5) number of goals scored; 6) drawing of lots
(H) Hosts

=== Ranking of second-placed teams ===
Pos	Grp	Team	Pld	W	D	L	GF	GA	GD	Pts	Qualification
1	D	Railways	4	3	0	1	12	2	+10	9	Final round
2	A	Kerala	4	3	0	1	12	2	+10	9	Final round
3	E	Mizoram	4	3	0	1	9	2	+7	9	Final round
4	C	Uttar Pradesh	4	3	0	1	10	8	+2	9	
5	F	Telangana	4	2	1	1	8	3	+5	7	
6	B	Punjab	4	2	0	2	7	2	+5	6	

Updated to match(es) played on unknown. Source: Flashscore

== Final round ==
- Karnataka directly qualified for final round as defending champions.
- Meghalaya directly qualified for final round as runners up of previous edition.
- Arunachal Pradesh directly qualified for final round as hosts.

=== Group A ===
Pos	Team	Pld	W	D	L	GF	GA	GD	Pts	Qualification	SE	GA	KL	AS	MG	AP
1	Services	5	3	1	1	9	3	+6	10	Advanced to knockout stage		1–2				
2	Goa	5	2	3	0	10	7	+3	9	Advanced to knockout stage			2–0	3–3	0–0	3–3
3	Kerala	5	2	2	1	7	5	+2	8	Advanced to knockout stage	1–1				1–1	
4	Assam	5	2	1	2	8	9	−1	7	Advanced to knockout stage	0–2		1–3			
5	Meghalaya	5	0	3	2	4	6	−2	3		0–1			1–2		
6	Arunachal Pradesh (H)	5	0	2	3	5	13	−8	2		0–4		0–2	0–2		

Updated to match(es) played on 2nd March 2024. Source: AIFF
Rules for classification: 1) points; 2) head-to-head points; 3) head-to-head goal difference; 4) goal difference; 5) number of goals scored; 6) drawing of lots
(H) Hosts
21 February 2024
10:00

Meghalaya	0–1	Services
	Report	Shafeel PP 90+5'

Golden Jubilee Stadium, Yupia
21 February 2024
14:30

Assam	1–3	Kerala
Dipu Mirdha 77'	Report	Abdu Raheem K 19'; Sajeesh E 67'; Nijo Gilbert 90+5'

Golden Jubilee Stadium, Yupia
21 February 2024
19:00

Goa	3–3	Arunachal Pradesh
Necio Maristo Fernandes 20'; Mahammed Faheez 73'; Joshua D'silva 76'	Report	Rahul Goju Singpho 25', 90+6'; Tame Agung 62'

Golden Jubilee Stadium, Yupia

23 February 2024
10:00

Arunachal Pradesh	0–4	Services
	Report	Samir Murmu 11'; Vijay J 23'; Bikash Thapa 52', 56'

Golden Jubilee Stadium, Yupia
23 February 2024
14:30

Meghalaya	1–2	Assam
Sheen Stevenson Sohktung 32'	Report	Milan Basumatary 8'; Joydeep Gogoi 45'

Golden Jubilee Stadium, Yupia
23 February 2024
19:00

Goa	2–0	Kerala
Necio Maristo Fernandes 45', 59'	Report

Golden Jubilee Stadium, Yupia

25 February 2024
10:00

Services	1–2	Goa
P Christopher Kamei 90+1'	Report	Lloyd Cardozo 70'; Joshua D'silva 89'

Golden Jubilee Stadium, Yupia
25 February 2024
14:30

Kerala	1–1	Meghalaya
Naresh Bhagyanathan 4'	Report	Sheen Stevenson Sohktung 78'

Golden Jubilee Stadium, Yupia
25 February 2024
19:00

Arunachal Pradesh	0–2	Assam
	Report	Dipu Mirdha 7'; Akrang Narzary 90+4'

Golden Jubilee Stadium, Yupia

28 February 2024
10:00

Assam	0–2	Services
	Report	T Bidhyasagar Singh 45'; P Christopher Kamei 50'

Golden Jubilee Stadium, Yupia
28 February 2024
14:30

Kerala	2–0	Arunachal Pradesh
M Ashiq Shoukathali 35'; Arjun V 52'	Report

Golden Jubilee Stadium, Yupia
28 February 2024
19:00

Meghalaya	0–0	Goa
	Report

Golden Jubilee Stadium, Yupia

1 March 2024
10:00

Services	1–1	Kerala
Samir Murmu 45+4'	Report	Sajeesh E 22'

Golden Jubilee Stadium, Yupia
1 March 2024
14:30

Goa	3–3	Assam
Lloyd Cardozo 3'; Delton Colaco 12'; Joshua D'silva 89'	Report	P. Gogoi 27'; Sudeepta Konwar 45+3'; Basumatary 56'

Golden Jubilee Stadium, Yupia
1 March 2024
19:00

Arunachal Pradesh	2–2	Meghalaya
Tarh Dolu 22'; Rahul Goju Singpho 56'	Report	Lyngdoh 8'; Sheen Sohktung 83'

Golden Jubilee Stadium, Yupia

=== Group B ===
Pos	Team	Pld	W	D	L	GF	GA	GD	Pts	Qualification	MN	MZ	DL	RW	MA	KA
1	Manipur	5	4	1	0	10	4	+6	13	Advanced to knockout stage		4–1		1–1		
2	Mizoram	5	2	1	2	13	10	+3	7	Advanced to knockout stage			5–1	4–0		
3	Delhi	5	2	1	2	10	10	0	7	Advanced to knockout stage	1–2			4–0		1–1
4	Railways	5	2	1	2	4	10	−6	7	Advanced to knockout stage					2–1	1–0
5	Maharashtra	5	2	0	3	10	9	+1	6		1–2	3–1	2–3			
6	Karnataka	5	0	2	3	4	8	−4	2		0–1	2–2			1–3	

Source: AIFF
Rules for classification: 1) points; 2) head-to-head points; 3) head-to-head goal difference; 4) goal difference; 5) number of goals scored; 6) drawing of lots
22 February 2024
10:00

Delhi	1–1	Karnataka
Prabin Tigga (og) 26'	Report	Appu Arogya Swamy P 23'

Golden Jubilee Stadium, Yupia
22 February 2024
14:30

Manipur	1–1	Railways
Phijam Sanathoi Meetei 56'	Report	Akash Babu 90+5'

Golden Jubilee Stadium, Yupia
22 February 2024
19:00

Maharashtra	3–1	Mizoram
Advait Shinde 26'; Lalhmunmawia (og) 77'; Dipak Patil 90+6'	Report	Malsawmzuala 82'

Golden Jubilee Stadium, Yupia

24 February 2024
10:00

Karnataka	2–2	Mizoram
Prabin Tigga 67'; Vishal R 69'	Report	MS Dawngliana 13'; Malsawmzuala 47'

Golden Jubilee Stadium, Yupia
24 February 2024
14:30

Maharashtra	1–2	Manipur
Azfar Noorani 14'	Report	Rojen Meetei Wahengbam 40'; Ningombam Kabiraj Singh 88'

Golden Jubilee Stadium, Yupia
24 February 2024
19:00

Delhi	4–0	Railways
Vivek Kumar 44'; Jaideep Singh 50', 76'; Milind Negi 68'	Report

Golden Jubilee Stadium, Yupia

26 February 2024
10:00

Mizoram	5–1	Delhi
Malsawmzuala 26', 38'; Malsawmzuala Tlangte 29', 32'; MS Dawngliana 67'	Report	Mohit Mittal 90+2'

Golden Jubilee Stadium, Yupia
26 February 2024
14:30

Railways	2–1	Maharashtra
Subrata Murmu 11'; Rajesh S 73'	Report	Nikhil Kadam 43'

Golden Jubilee Stadium, Yupia
26 February 2024
19:00

Karnataka	0–1	Manipur
	Report	Ngangbam Pacha Singh 50'

Golden Jubilee Stadium, Yupia

29 February 2024
10:00

Manipur	4–1	Mizoram
Leimajam Sangkar Singh 8'; Phijam Sanathoi Meetei 35', 90'; Pebam Renedy Singh 56'	Report	Malsawmzuala Tlangte 84'

Golden Jubilee Stadium, Yupia
29 February 2024
14:30

Railways	1–0	Karnataka
Subrata Murmu 53'	Report

Golden Jubilee Stadium, Yupia
29 February 2024
19:00

Maharashtra	2–3	Delhi
Mohammed Arfat Ansari 2', 65'	Report	Bhaaranyu Bansal 7'; Milind Negi 43'; Sridarth Nongmeikapam 90+7'

Golden Jubilee Stadium, Yupia

2 March 2024
10:00

Karnataka	1–3	Maharashtra
Rashid CK 68'	Report	Mohammed Arfat Ansari 20', 43', 82'

Golden Jubilee Stadium, Yupia
2 March 2024
14:30

Delhi	1–2	Manipur
Rishabh Dobriyal 41'	Report	Phijam Sanathoi Meetei 7'; Leimajam Sangkar Singh 66'

Golden Jubilee Stadium, Yupia
2 March 2024
19:00

Mizoram	4–0	Railways
Lalthankima 17'; Vanlalbiaa Chhangte 81'; Abhishek Aich (og) 81'; Malsawmfela 90+3'	Report

Golden Jubilee Stadium, Yupia

== Knockout stage ==
=== Bracket ===
Quarter-finals
March 4 - Yupia
Services	2
Railways	0
March 5 - Yupia
Mizoram	0(7)
Kerala	0(6)
March 5 - Yupia
Manipur	7
Assam	1
March 4 - Yupia
Goa	2
Delhi	1

Semi-finals
March 7 - Yupia
Services	2
Mizoram	1
March 7 - Yupia
Manipur	1
Goa	2

Final
March 9 - Yupia
Services	1
Goa	0

=== Quarter-finals ===
4 March 2024
14:30

Services	2–0	Railways
Shafeel PP 9' (pen.); Samir Murmu 45+1'	Report

Golden Jubilee Stadium, Yupia

4 March 2024
19:00

Goa	2–1	Delhi
Jobern Cardozo 20'; Lloyd Cardozo 2'	Report	Sahil Kumar 8'

Golden Jubilee Stadium, Yupia

5 March 2024
14:30

Manipur	7–1	Assam
Phijam Sanathoi Meetei 4'; W. Sadananda Singh 11', 16', 70'; Ngangbam Pacha Singh 19' (pen.); Maibam Deny Singh 82'; Imarson Meitei 88'	Report	Joydeep Gogoi 64'

Golden Jubilee Stadium, Yupia

5 March 2024
19:00

Mizoram	0–0	Kerala
	Report
Penalties
MC Malsawmzuala (penalty scored); Malsawmfela (penalty scored); FC Lalhmunmawia (penalty scored); Ephraim Lalremtluanga (penalty scored); Lalrinchhana Tochhawng (penalty scored); Lalremruata HP (penalty scored); Lalbiakthanga Hmar (penalty scored)	7–6	(penalty scored) Sanju G.; (penalty scored) Arjun V.; (penalty scored) Mohamed Salim; (penalty scored) Riswanali E.; (penalty scored) Sarath Prasanth; (penalty scored) Jithin G.; (penalty missed) Sujith VR

Golden Jubilee Stadium, Yupia

=== Semi-finals ===
Rahul Ramakrishnan and substitute Bikash Thapa scored one goal each in either half for the dominant Services, while Malsawmfela reduced the lead in injury time for Mizoram through a direct free kick goal. Services made the final of the competition for the 12th time. In the second semifinal, Ngangbam Pacha Singh scored for Manipur from 30 yards, with substitute Necio Fernandes equalising in the injury time with a bicycle kick off Joshua D’Silva. Fernandes scored again, the winner, in extra time, taking his team to the final, for their 14th time.

7 March 2024
14:30

Services	2–1	Mizoram
Rahul Ramakrishnan 21'; Bikash Thapa 83'	Report	Malsawmfela 90+3'

Golden Jubilee Stadium, Yupia

7 March 2024
19:00

Manipur	1–2 (a.e.t.)	Goa
Ngangbam Pacha Singh 18'	Report	Necio Fernandes 90+6', 116'

Golden Jubilee Stadium, Yupia
Referee: Jehrul Islam

=== Final ===
9 March 2024
19:00

Services	1–0	Goa
Shafeel PP 68'	Report

Golden Jubilee Stadium, Yupia
Attendance: 15,000 (est.)

== Statistics ==
Rank	Player	Team	Goal(s)
1	Phijam Sanathoi Meetei	Manipur	11
2	Samir Murmu	Services	10
3	Dipu Mirdha	Assam	9
4	Lalkhawpuimawia	Mizoram	8
4	Wangkheimayum Sadananda Singh	Manipur	8
Source: AIFF

== Awards ==
The following awards were given out at the end of the tournament: the top scorer, Best Goalkeeper, Player of the Tournament and Fair Play Award.

Award	Player	Team
Top Scorer	Phijam Sanathoi Meitei	Manipur
Best Goalkeeper	Sayad bin Abdul Kadir	Services
Player of the Tournament	Samir Murmu	Services
Fair Play Award	—	Jharkhand

== Broadcasting ==
Territory	Broadcaster(s)	Ref.
India	YouTube	
India	FIFA+	
(United Nations) Global	FIFA+	
