= 2004–05 Santosh Trophy =

59th Senior National Football Championship

Tournament details
- Country: India
- Teams: 32

Final positions
- Champions: Kerala (5th title)
- Runners-up: Punjab

The 59th Santosh Trophy 2004 was held in Delhi from 14 October 2004 to 31 October 2004. Kerala won their fifth title beating Punjab (3-2) in the finals.

== Qualifying rounds ==
Venues:

- Ambedkar Stadium, Delhi
- Chhatrasal Stadium, North Delhi
- Thyagaraj Sports Complex, New Delhi

Results

=== Cluster I ===
Team	Pld	W	D	L	GF	GA	GD	Pts
Bengal	2	2	0	0	8	1	+7	6
Andhra Pradesh	2	1	0	1	2	3	−1	3
Mizoram	2	0	0	2	1	7	−6	0

=== Cluster II ===
Team	Pld	W	D	L	GF	GA	GD	Pts
Delhi	3	2	0	1	9	2	+7	6
Gujarat	3	2	0	1	4	8	−4	6
Assam	3	1	0	2	11	7	+4	3
Madhya Pradesh	3	1	0	2	2	9	−7	3

=== Cluster III ===
Team	Pld	W	D	L	GF	GA	GD	Pts
Railways	3	2	1	0	6	0	+6	6 (Note: 1 point deducted?)
Bihar	3	1	1	1	3	5	−2	4
Uttarakhand	3	1	0	2	3	6	−3	3
Chandigarh	3	0	2	1	0	1	−1	2

=== Cluster IV ===
Team	Pld	W	D	L	GF	GA	GD	Pts
Uttar Pradesh	2	2	0	0	5	1	+4	6
Maharastra	2	1	0	1	3	3	0	3
Jharkhand	2	0	0	2	1	5	−4	0
Arunachal Pradesh (Note: Arunachal Pradesh did not participate.)	0	0	0	0	0	0	0	0

=== Cluster V ===
Team	Pld	W	D	L	GF	GA	GD	Pts
Punjab	3	3	0	0	15	0	+15	9
Chhattisgarh	3	1	0	2	5	7	−2	3
Meghalaya	3	1	0	2	6	10	−4	3
Tripura	3	1	0	2	3	12	−9	3

=== Cluster VI ===
Team	Pld	W	D	L	GF	GA	GD	Pts
Karnataka	3	3	0	0	12	0	+12	9
Haryana	3	2	0	1	6	3	+3	6
Himachal Pradesh	3	0	1	2	2	9	−7	1
Rajasthan	3	0	1	2	2	16	−14	1

=== Cluster VII ===
Team	Pld	W	D	L	GF	GA	GD	Pts
Sikkim	2	2	0	0	8	6	+2	6
Orissa	2	1	0	1	7	7	0	3
Pondicherry	2	0	0	2	6	8	−2	0

=== Cluster VIII ===
Team	Pld	W	D	L	GF	GA	GD	Pts
Tamil Nadu	2	1	1	0	5	1	+4	4
J & K	2	0	2	0	1	1	0	2
Nagaland	2	0	1	1	0	4	−4	1

== Quarterfinal League ==
=== Group A ===
Team	Pld	W	D	L	GF	GA	GD	Pts
Services	2	2	0	0	4	0	+4	6
West Bengal	2	1	0	1	2	1	+1	3
Uttar Pradesh	2	0	0	2	0	5	−5	0

=== Group B ===
Team	Pld	W	D	L	GF	GA	GD	Pts
Manipur	2	1	1	0	4	2	+2	4
Karnataka	2	1	1	0	3	2	+1	4
Sikkim	2	0	0	2	0	3	−3	0

=== Group C ===
Team	Pld	W	D	L	GF	GA	GD	Pts
Kerala	2	1	1	0	4	2	+2	4
Railways	2	1	1	0	3	2	+1	4
Delhi	2	0	0	2	0	3	−3	0

=== Group D ===
Team	Pld	W	D	L	GF	GA	GD	Pts
Punjab	2	1	1	0	4	2	+2	4
Goa	2	1	1	0	3	2	+1	4
Tamil Nadu	2	0	0	2	0	3	−3	0

== Semi-finals ==
28 October 2004

Kerala	2–0	Services
Abdul Naushad 28'; Naushad Pari 90+2'	Report

Ambedkar Stadium, Delhi
Referee: Benjamin D'Silva (Goa)

29 October 2004

Punjab	1–1 (a.e.t.)	Manipur
Parveen Kumar 101'	Report	Tomba Singh 113'
Penalties
Harvinder (penalty missed); Harpreet Singh (penalty scored); Daljit Singh (penalty scored); Gurjit Singh (penalty scored); Harish Sharma (penalty scored)	4–3	Rajesh Meetei (penalty scored); Bijen Singh (penalty scored); Dharamjit Singh (penalty scored); James (penalty missed); Raju (penalty missed)

Ambedkar Stadium, Delhi
Referee: S. Suresh

== Final ==
31 October 2004

Kerala	3–2 (a.e.t.)	Punjab
K. Bineesh 8'; KM Abdul Naushad 54'; Slyvester Ignatius 107'	Report	Hardeep Gill 48' (pen.); Harpreet Singh 51'

Ambedkar Stadium, Delhi
Referee: Rizwan-ul-Haq
