= 2008–09 Santosh Trophy qualification =

Association football competition

The 2008–09 Santosh Trophy qualification was the qualifying round for the 2008–09 edition of the Santosh Trophy, the premier association football competition in India for teams representing their state football associations. It began on 24 May and ended on 1 June 2009.

Twenty-seven teams entered the competition and were divided into eight 'clusters' to play the qualification after Nagaland pulled out. The winner of each cluster were to move to the pre-quarter final knock-out round from which four would progress to the quarter-final stage. Punjab, Services, Bengal and Karnataka were directly seeded to the quarterfinal league.

== Qualification ==
=== Cluster I ===
Pos	Team	Pld	W	D	L	GF	GA	GD	Pts	Qualification
1	Kerala	2	2	0	0	8	0	+8	6	Pre-quarterfinals
2	Chhattisgarh	2	0	1	1	0	3	−3	1	
3	Chandigarh	2	0	1	1	0	5	−5	1	

24 May 2009
16:00 IST

Chandigarh	0–0	Chhattisgarh
	Report

Jawaharlal Nehru Stadium, Coimbatore

26 May 2009

Chandigarh	0–5	Kerala
	Report	K. P. Zubair 36', 38'; Balan 67'; Mundampara 84'; Pradeep 90+1'

Jawaharlal Nehru Stadium, Coimbatore

28 May 2009

Kerala	3–0	Chhattisgarh
Pradeep 25'; K. P. Zubair 62'; Mathew 82'	Report

Jawaharlal Nehru Stadium, Coimbatore

=== Cluster II ===
Pos	Team	Pld	W	D	L	GF	GA	GD	Pts	Qualification
1	Maharashtra	2	2	0	0	6	0	+6	6	Pre-quarterfinals
2	Meghalaya	2	1	0	1	1	3	−2	3	
3	Uttar Pradesh	2	0	0	2	0	4	−4	0	

25 May 2009
16:00 IST

Maharashtra	3–0	Uttar Pradesh
Edathodika 31'; Ambrose 55'; Zahid Ansari 90+3'	Report Archived 2020-10-10 at the Wayback Machine(subscription required)

Jawaharlal Nehru Stadium, Coimbatore

29 May 2009

Maharashtra	3–0	Meghalaya
Shivalkar 64'; K. Sampath Kumar 67', 69'	Report

Jawaharlal Nehru Stadium, Coimbatore

=== Cluster III ===
Pos	Team	Pld	W	D	L	GF	GA	GD	Pts	Qualification
1	Mizoram	3	2	1	0	9	2	+7	7	Pre-quarterfinals
2	Madhya Pradesh	3	1	2	0	7	3	+4	5	
3	Jammu and Kashmir	3	1	1	1	2	4	−2	4	
4	Puducherry	3	0	0	3	0	9	−9	0	

24 May 2009
07:00 IST

Jammu and Kashmir	1–1	Madhya Pradesh
Taufeek 42'	Report	Athoiba Maitai 85'

St. Joseph's College Ground, Tiruchirappalli

24 May 2009
16:00 IST

Mizoram	4–0	Puducherry
Rohminthanga 16'; Lalpekhlua 23'; Lalawmpuia 55'; Hmar 90' (pen.)	Report

St. Joseph's College Ground, Tiruchirappalli

26 May 2009

Madhya Pradesh	2–2	Mizoram
Sonu Rajak 11', 51'	Report Archived 2022-05-02 at the Wayback Machine(subscription required)	Lalpekhlua 20'; Hmar 89' (pen.)

St. Joseph's College Ground, Tiruchirappalli

26 May 2009

Jammu and Kashmir	1–0	Puducherry
Taufeek 69'	Report Archived 2022-05-02 at the Wayback Machine(subscription required)

St. Joseph's College Ground, Tiruchirappalli

28 May 2009

Jammu and Kashmir	0–3	Mizoram
	Report	Lalawmpuia 51'; Lalpekhlua 75'; Lalrokhuma 88'

St. Joseph's College Ground, Tiruchirappalli

28 May 2009

Madhya Pradesh	4–0	Puducherry
Krishna Kumar Singh 25'; Santosh Rajak 59'; Sonu Rajak 63'; Bhagwan Das 88'	Report Archived 2022-05-02 at the Wayback Machine(subscription required)

St. Joseph's College Ground, Tiruchirappalli

=== Cluster IV ===
Pos	Team	Pld	W	D	L	GF	GA	GD	Pts	Qualification
1	Goa	2	2	0	0	5	0	+5	6	Pre-quarterfinals
2	Jharkhand	2	1	0	1	3	3	0	3	
3	Orissa	2	0	0	2	2	7	−5	0	

26 May 2009
16:00 IST

Goa	1–0	Jharkhand
F. Masceranhas 82'	Report Archived 2020-10-25 at the Wayback Machine(subscription required)

St. Joseph's College Ground, Tiruchirappalli

27 May 2009

Jharkhand	3–2	Orissa
Subodh Kumar (?); Suresh Kaundi (?)	Report	Gyana Ranjan Samal (?); Ashok Das (?)

St. Joseph's College Ground, Tiruchirappalli

29 May 2009

Goa	4–0	Orissa
M. Masceranhas 1'; D'Mello 33'; Lawrence 44'; Rodrigues 70'	Report

St. Joseph's College Ground, Tiruchirappalli

=== Cluster V ===
Pos	Team	Pld	W	D	L	GF	GA	GD	Pts	Qualification
1	Railways	2	2	0	0	2	0	+2	6	Pre-quarterfinals
2	Assam	2	1	0	1	2	2	0	3	
3	Delhi	2	0	0	2	1	3	−2	0	

24 May 2009
16:00 IST

Delhi	0–1	Railways
	Report Archived 2022-05-02 at the Wayback Machine(subscription required)	Abhishek 45+1'

Don Bosco Youth Centre, Tiruvallur

26 May 2009

Assam	2–1	Delhi
Raju Konwar 12'; Boro 51'	Report	Raju Konwar 88' (o.g.)

Don Bosco Youth Centre, Tiruvallur

28 May 2009

Assam	0–1	Railways
	Report	Amrinder Singh 39'

Don Bosco Youth Centre, Tiruvallur

=== Cluster VI ===
Pos	Team	Pld	W	D	L	GF	GA	GD	Pts	Qualification
1	Manipur	2	2	0	0	11	0	+11	6	Pre-quarterfinals
2	Sikkim	2	0	1	1	2	4	−2	1	
3	Uttarakhand	2	0	1	1	2	11	−9	1	

25 May 2009

Manipur	9–0	Uttarakhand
Bisheshwor Singh 33', 73'; B. Singh 45'; Vashum 45+1', 63', 89'; Su. Singh 59', 77'; J. Singh 90+2'	Report Archived 2020-09-14 at the Wayback Machine(subscription required)

Don Bosco Youth Centre, Tiruvallur

29 May 2009

Manipur	2–0	Sikkim
Paite 14'; Su. Singh 41'	Report

Don Bosco Youth Centre, Tiruvallur

=== Cluster VII ===
Pos	Team	Pld	W	D	L	GF	GA	GD	Pts	Qualification
1	Haryana	2	2	0	0	9	0	+9	6	Pre-quarterfinals
2	Bihar	2	1	0	1	10	3	+7	3	
3	Gujarat	2	0	0	2	0	16	−16	0	

25 May 2009

Gujarat	0–6	Haryana
	Report Archived 2020-10-24 at the Wayback Machine(subscription required)	Vivek Singh Kaira 17', 71'; Jaswant Parmar 50'; Sunil Kumar Sharma 52', 56'; Pawan Kumar 73'

Jawaharlal Nehru Stadium, Chennai

28 May 2009

Bihar	10–0	Gujarat
Debashish Rai (?); Naveen Thapa (?); Mohammed Shahbaz (?); Rajgrih Yadav (?)	Report

Jawaharlal Nehru Stadium, Chennai

29 May 2009
16:00 IST

Bihar	0–3	Haryana
	Report	Surender Kumar 6'; Pradeep Kumar 42', 90'

Jawaharlal Nehru Stadium, Chennai

=== Cluster VIII ===
Pos	Team	Pld	W	D	L	GF	GA	GD	Pts	Qualification
1	Tamil Nadu	3	3	0	0	25	0	+25	9	Pre-quarterfinals
2	Tripura	3	2	0	1	7	8	−1	6	
3	Rajasthan	3	1	0	2	4	14	−10	3	
4	Himachal Pradesh	3	0	0	3	2	16	−14	0	

24 May 2009
16:00 IST

Tamil Nadu	7–0	Rajasthan
P. C. Riju 14', 76', 84'; Pradeep 27'; Suresh Kumar 47', 53'; Ravanan 82'	Report

Jawaharlal Nehru Stadium, Chennai

24 May 2009
18:30 IST

Himachal Pradesh	0–2	Tripura
	Report	Paltu Dutta Chowdhury 45'; Rupak Mazumdar 69'

Jawaharlal Nehru Stadium, Chennai

26 May 2009

Tamil Nadu	11–0	Himachal Pradesh
P. C. Riju 8', 65', 70', 74'; Muthu 11', 63', 74'; Kulothungan 22' (pen.), 44', 84'; Jagan 87'	Report Archived 2022-05-02 at the Wayback Machine(subscription required)

Jawaharlal Nehru Stadium, Chennai

26 May 2009

Rajasthan	0–5	Tripura
Vikas Gupta 73'	Report Archived 2022-05-02 at the Wayback Machine(subscription required)	Utpal Choudhary 22'; Swapan Rai 24'; Shyamal Bhowmik 35'; Paltu Dutta Choudhury 42'; Bikram Jamatia 84'

Jawaharlal Nehru Stadium, Chennai

28 May 2009

Tamil Nadu	7–0	Tripura
P. C. Riju 21', 65'; Pradeep 12'; Kulothungan 27'; Muthu 30', 87'; Elamurugan 90+1'	Report Archived 2022-05-02 at the Wayback Machine(subscription required)

Jawaharlal Nehru Stadium, Chennai

28 May 2009

Himachal Pradesh	2–3	Rajasthan
	Report

Jawaharlal Nehru Stadium, Chennai

== Pre-quarterfinals ==
1 June 2009

Tamil Nadu	5–0	Haryana
Kulothungan 18'; Muthu 45', 88'; P. C. Riju 48', 81'	Report

Jawaharlal Nehru Stadium, Chennai

1 June 2009

Maharashtra	1–0	Kerala
Kuttymani 83'	Report

Jawaharlal Nehru Stadium, Coimbatore

1 June 2009

Goa	3–0	Mizoram
Abranches 44'; Masceranhas 58', 63'	Report

St. Joseph's College Ground, Tiruchirappalli

1 June 2009

Railways	1–3	Manipur
Nalanda Chakravarthy 80'	Report	Su. Singh 19'; Vashum 40', 79'

Don Bosco Youth Centre, Tiruvallur
