= 2012–13 Santosh Trophy =

Tournament details
- Country: India
- Teams: 31

Final positions
- Champions: Services (3rd title)
- Runners-up: Kerala

Tournament statistics
- Top goal scorer: Services

The 2013 Santosh Trophy was the 67th edition of the Santosh Trophy, the main state competition in Indian football. The tournament this season was held from 1 February to 3 March 2013 in Uttar Pradesh and Kerala.

Services won the title defeating Kerala in the final at Jawaharlal Nehru Stadium, Kochi, Kerala.

== Teams ==
In this tournament, 31 state teams from India will be participating.

Automatically in the Group Stage Proper	Enter in Qualification Round 1	Enter in Qualification Round 2
Tamil Nadu (Reigning Runners-up); Services (Reigning Champions); Kerala; Manipur	Chhattisgarh; Delhi; Goa; Haryana; Maharashtra; Meghalaya; Mizoram; Orissa; Punjab; Railways; Uttar Pradesh; West Bengal	Arunachal Pradesh; Assam; Bihar; Chandigarh; Daman and Diu; Gujarat; Himachal Pradesh; Jammu and Kashmir; Jharkhand; Karnataka; Madhya Pradesh; Nagaland; Pondicherry; Rajasthan; Sikkim; Tripura; Uttarakhand

== Group stage proper ==
=== Group A ===
Team	Pld	W	D	L	GF	GA	GD	Pts
Services	3	2	1	0	8	0	+8	7
Railways	3	2	1	0	7	1	+6	7
Orissa	3	1	0	2	4	6	−2	3
Madhya Pradesh	3	0	0	3	2	14	−12	0

=== Group B ===
Team	Pld	W	D	L	GF	GA	GD	Pts
Maharashtra	3	3	0	0	9	2	+7	9
Tamil Nadu	3	1	1	1	4	4	0	4
Goa	3	0	2	1	2	5	−3	2
Jharkhand	3	0	1	2	5	9	−4	1

=== Group C ===
Team	Pld	W	D	L	GF	GA	GD	Pts
Kerala	3	2	1	0	6	3	+3	7
Haryana	3	1	1	1	5	4	+1	4
Uttar Pradesh	3	1	0	2	5	6	−1	3
Jammu & Kashmir	3	1	0	2	3	6	−3	3

=== Group D ===
Team	Pld	W	D	L	GF	GA	GD	Pts
Punjab	3	3	0	0	9	3	+6	9
West Bengal	3	2	0	1	8	6	+2	6
Karnataka	3	1	0	2	3	4	−1	3
Manipur	3	0	0	3	3	10	−7	0

== Semi-final ==
28 February 2013

Kerala	2–1 (a.e.t.)	Maharashtra
Usman 55' (pen.); Lal 118'	Report	Lalrempuia 71'

Jawaharlal Nehru Stadium, Kochi, Kerala
Referee: Ranjit Bhakshi

1 March 2013

Services	3–1 (a.e.t.)	Punjab
Mawia 86', 117'; Singh 108'	Report	Kumar 20'

Jawaharlal Nehru Stadium, Kochi, Kerala

== Final ==
3 March 2013

Kerala	0–0 (a.e.t.)	Services
	Report
Penalties
Rino Anto (penalty scored); Basid (penalty scored); Sarath (penalty scored)	3–4	(penalty scored) Singh; (penalty scored) Kumar; (penalty scored) Dileep; (penalty scored) Varghese

Jawaharlal Nehru Stadium, Kochi, Kerala
Attendance: 35,000

== Top scorers ==
As of 2 March 2013

Rank	Player	State	Goals
1	(India) Lalian Mawia	Services	5
2	(India) Mohammed Rafi	Maharashtra	4
2	(India) R Kannan	Kerala	4
2	(India) VV Farhad	Services	4
2	(India) Prem Kumar	Punjab	4
6	(India) Vikas	Haryana	3
6	(India) Pappachen Pradeep	Maharashtra	3
6	(India) Nabin Hela	West Bengal	3
