= 1987–88 Santosh Trophy =

National Football Championship

Tournament details
- Country: India

Final positions
- Champions: Punjab (6th title)
- Runners-up: Kerala

Tournament statistics
- Matches played: 56
- Goals scored: 145 (2.59 per match)
- Top goal scorer(s): Darbara Singh (7 goals)

The 1987–88 Santosh Trophy was the 44th edition of the Santosh Trophy, the main State competition for football in India. It was held in Kollam, Kerala. Punjab defeated Kerala 5–4 in sudden death in the final to win the competition for the sixth time.

== Preliminary round ==
Group 1

Pos	Team	Pld	W	D	L	GF	GA	GD	Pts	Qualification
1	Punjab	3	3	0	0	10	0	+10	6	Qualified for Final Round
2	Uttar Pradesh	3	2	0	1	5	5	0	4	
3	Delhi	3	1	0	2	2	4	−2	2	
4	Himachal Pradesh	3	0	0	3	2	10	−8	0	

1988

Delhi	2-1	Himachal Pradesh

1988

Punjab	4-0	Uttar Pradesh

1988

Uttar Pradesh	2-0	Delhi

1988

Punjab	5-0	Himachal Pradesh

1988

Uttar Pradesh	3-1	Himachal Pradesh

1988

Punjab	1-0	Delhi

Group 2

Pos	Team	Pld	W	D	L	GF	GA	GD	Pts	Qualification
1	Tamil Nadu	3	3	0	0	6	0	+6	6	Qualified for Final Round
2	Services	3	2	0	1	10	1	+9	4	
3	Nagaland	3	0	1	2	0	3	−3	1	
4	Tripura	3	0	1	2	0	12	−12	1	

1988

Tamil Nadu	3-0	Tripura

1988

Services	1-0	Nagaland

1988

Services	9-0	Tripura

1988

Tamil Nadu	2-0	Nagaland

1988

Tamil Nadu	1-0	Services

1988

Nagaland	0-0	Tripura

Group 3

Pos	Team	Pld	W	D	L	GF	GA	GD	Pts	Qualification
1	Karnataka	3	3	0	0	9	2	+7	6	Qualified for Final Round
2	Madhya Pradesh	3	2	0	1	6	3	+3	4	
3	Meghalaya	3	1	0	2	5	8	−3	2	
4	Gujarat	3	0	0	3	2	9	−7	0	

1988

Madhya Pradesh	3-1	Meghalaya

1988

Karnataka	4-0	Gujarat

1988

Madhya Pradesh	3-1	Gujarat

1988

Karnataka	4-2	Meghalaya

1988

Meghalaya	2-1	Gujarat

1988

Karnataka	1-0	Madhya Pradesh

Group 4

Pos	Team	Pld	W	D	L	GF	GA	GD	Pts	Qualification
1	Goa	3	3	0	0	9	0	+9	6	Qualified for Final Round
2	Haryana	3	1	1	1	3	1	+2	3	
3	Rajasthann	3	1	1	1	1	3	−2	3	
4	Pondicherry	3	0	0	3	0	9	−9	0	

1988

Goa	1-0	Haryana

1988

Rajasthann	1-0	Pondicherry

1988

Goa	3-0	Rajasthann

1988

Haryana	3-0	Pondicherry

1988

Haryana	0-0	Rajasthann

1988

Goa	5-0	Pondicherry

Group 5

Pos	Team	Pld	W	D	L	GF	GA	GD	Pts	Qualification
1	Jammu-Kashmir	2	1	1	0	1	0	+1	3	Qualified for Final Round
2	Andhra Pradesh	2	1	1	0	1	0	+1	3	
3	Sikkim	2	0	0	2	0	2	−2	0	

1988

Andhra Pradesh	1-0	Sikkim

1988

Andhra Pradesh	0-0	Jammu-Kashmir

1988

Jammu-Kashmir	1-0	Sikkim

Group 6

Pos	Team	Pld	W	D	L	GF	GA	GD	Pts	Qualification
1	Maharashtra	3	3	0	0	8	1	+7	6	Qualified for Final Round
2	Orissa	3	1	0	2	3	3	0	2	
3	Assam	3	1	0	2	3	5	−2	2	
4	Manipur	3	1	0	2	4	9	−5	2	

1988

Manipur	3-1	Assam

1988

Maharashtra	1-0	Orissa

1988

Assam	1-0	Orissa

1988

Maharashtra	5-0	Manipur

1988

Orissa	3-1	Manipur

1988

Maharashtra	2-1	Assam

== Final round ==
Santhosh trophy 1986-87 semi finalists - Bengal, Bihar, Kerala and Railways - got direct entry to the final round.

Group A

Karnataka had 0-0 draws in their first three matches. They needed to beat Bihar 5–0 in the last match of the league to displace Bengal from the second place and qualify for the semifinal. Bihar lost 6–0. The Bengal players attempted to stage a "black flag demonstration" to protest the result. This led to police action where nine Bengal players including captain Sudip Chatterjee, the manager Montu Ghosh and assistant Pradip Dutta were injured.

Pos	Team	Pld	W	D	L	GF	GA	GD	Pts	Qualification
1	Punjab	4	2	2	0	3	1	+2	6	Qualified for Semifinals
2	Karnataka	4	1	3	0	6	0	+6	5	Qualified for Semifinals
3	Bengal	4	2	1	1	6	2	+4	5	
4	Bihar	4	1	0	3	3	9	−6	2	
5	Tamil Nadu	4	0	2	2	3	9	−6	2	

Group B

Pos	Team	Pld	W	D	L	GF	GA	GD	Pts	Qualification
1	Kerala	4	3	1	0	9	1	+8	7	Qualified for Semifinals
2	Maharashtra	4	2	1	1	6	1	+5	5	Qualified for Semifinals
3	Railways	4	1	2	1	5	3	+2	4	
4	Goa	4	1	2	1	3	2	+1	4	
5	Jammu-Kashmir	4	0	0	4	0	16	−16	0	

== Semifinals ==
18 April 1988

Kerala	1–0	Karnataka
Pappachan 11'	Report

Lal Bahadur Shastri Stadium, Kollam

19 April 1988

Punjab	1–0	Maharashtra
Kuljit Singh 61'	Report

Lal Bahadur Shastri Stadium, Kollam

== Final ==
21 April 1988

Punjab	0–0 (a.e.t.)	Kerala
	Report
Penalties
Parminder Singh (penalty missed); G. S. Parmar (penalty scored); Jagmohan Singh (penalty scored); Deepak Kumar (penalty scored); Avtar Singh (penalty scored); Dhanwant Kumar (penalty scored)	5–4	(penalty missed) Cletus; (penalty scored) Cherian Perumali; (penalty scored) V. P. Sathyan; (penalty scored) N. Ganesh; (penalty scored) Sharaf Ali; (penalty missed) Kurikesh Mathew

Lal Bahadur Shastri Stadium, Kollam
