= 1991–92 Santosh Trophy =

National Football Championship

Tournament details
- Country: India

Final positions
- Champions: Kerala (2nd title)
- Runners-up: Goa

Awards
- Best player: Hamilton Bobby (Tamil Nadu)

The 1991–92 Santosh Trophy was the 48th edition of the Santosh Trophy, the main State competition for football in India. It was held in Coimbatore, Tamil Nadu. Kerala defeated Goa 3–0 in the final. It was the second title for Kerala which had lost in the finals in the previous four years in a row.

== Quarter-final ==
=== Group 1 ===
Pos	Team	Pld	W	D	L	GF	GA	GD	Pts	Qualification
1	Tamil Nadu	2	1	1	0	5	3	+2	3	Advance to Semi-finals
2	Maharashtra	2	1	1	0	2	1	+1	3	
3	Assam	2	0	0	2	2	5	−3	0	

Source: Indian Express
Rules for classification: 1) points; 2) goal difference; 3) goals scored;
28 February 1992

Maharashtra	1–0	Tamil Nadu
Mansur Arfis 75'	Report

Coimbatore
1 March 1992

Tamil Nadu	4–2	Assam
Amalraj 55', 85'; Mukundan 63'; Ashok Kumar 70'	Report	Jagat Rabha ?', ?'

Coimbatore
3 March 1992

Tamil Nadu	1–1	Maharashtra
Hamilton Bobby 84'	Report	Mansur Arfis 77'

Coimbatore

=== Group 2 ===
Pos	Team	Pld	W	D	L	GF	GA	GD	Pts	Qualification
1	Kerala	2	2	0	0	9	0	+9	4	Advance to Semi-finals
2	Nagaland	2	1	0	1	4	6	−2	2	
3	Haryana	2	0	0	2	1	8	−7	0	

Source: Indian Express
Rules for classification: 1) points; 2) goal difference; 3) goals scored;
27 February 1992

Kerala	5–0	Nagaland
Pappachan; Harshan 72'; Asheem 84'; Sathyan	Report

Coimbatore
29 February 1992

Nagaland	4–1	Haryana
Azik 36'; Kehoto 42'; Teka 45'; Senti ?'	Report	Rakesh Sharma ?'

Coimbatore
2 March 1992

Kerala	4–0	Haryana
Harshan 40', 46'; Rajeev 59', ?'	Report

Coimbatore

=== Group 3 ===
Pos	Team	Pld	W	D	L	GF	GA	GD	Pts	Qualification
1	Goa	2	1	1	0	2	1	+1	3	Advance to Semi-finals
2	Punjab	2	0	2	0	0	0	0	2	
3	Delhi	2	0	1	1	1	2	−1	1	

Source: Indian Express
Rules for classification: 1) points; 2) goal difference; 3) goals scored;
28 February 1992

Punjab	0–0	Goa
	Report

Coimbatore
1 March 1992

Punjab	0–0	Delhi
	Report

Coimbatore
3 March 1992

Goa	2–1	Delhi
Lorenco Gomes 55'; Thomas Khushboo 90'	Report	Bikramjit 70'

Coimbatore

=== Group4 ===
Pos	Team	Pld	W	D	L	GF	GA	GD	Pts	Qualification
1	Bengal	2	1	1	0	4	2	+2	3	Advance to Semi-finals
2	Railways	0	0	0	0	0	0	0	0	
3	Karnataka	0	0	0	0	0	0	0	0	

Source: Indian Express
Rules for classification: 1) points; 2) goal difference; 3) goals scored;
27 February 1992

Bengal	2–2	Railways
	Report

Coimbatore
2 March 1992

Bengal	2–0	Karnataka
Satyajit Chatterjee 65'; Pabitra Kar ?'	Report

Coimbatore

== Semi-finals ==
6 March 1992

Goa	0–0 (a.e.t.)	Tamil Nadu
	Report
Penalties
Thomas Khusboo (penalty scored); Bruno Coutinho (penalty scored); Orlando Veigas (penalty scored); Derrick Pereira (penalty missed); Laurenco Gomes (penalty scored)	4–2	(penalty scored) Mahendran; (penalty scored) Satish Kumar; (penalty missed) Hamilton Bobby; (penalty missed) J. Kumaresan

Coimbatore

7 March 1992

Kerala	0–0 (a.e.t.)	Bengal
	Report
Penalties
Jiju Jacob (penalty scored); Thobias (penalty missed); Ajithkumar (penalty scored); P.S. Asheem (penalty scored); K.V. Sivadasan (penalty scored)	4–3	(penalty scored) Sudip Chatterjee; (penalty scored) Mushtaq Ali; (penalty missed) Satyajit Chatterjee; (penalty scored) Murshed Ali; (penalty missed) Vijayan

Coimbatore

After saving the fifth penalty by I. M. Vijayan, Kerala goalkeeper Sivadasan took and scored from the final kick for Kerala.

== Final ==
The brother of Goa goalkeeper Brahmanand Sankhwalkar died a day before the final. He was not informed of this until after the match.

9 March 1992
15:00 IST

Kerala	3–0	Goa
Rajeev 43'; P. S. Asheem 66', 88'	Report

Nehru Stadium, Coimbatore
Referee: Sagar Sen; Kantharajan and RD Sow (linesmen)
