= Kerala football team =

Football team representing Kerala State

Kerala
- Full name: Kerala state football team
- Founded: 1948; 78 years ago
- Ground: Jawaharlal Nehru Stadium
- Capacity: 41,000
- Owner: Kerala Football Association
- Head coach: Biby Thomas
- League: Santosh Trophy
- 2024–25: Runner-up
Home colours	Away colours	Third colours

The Kerala football team, formerly known as Travancore-Cochin football team, is an Indian state level semi-professional football team representing Kerala in Indian state football competitions including the Santosh Trophy and National Games of India.

The team appeared in the Santosh Trophy finals 15 times, and have won the trophy 7 times. Kerala last won the Santhosh Trophy in 2022 by defeating Bengal in the final on 2 May at the Payyanadu Stadium in Malappuram. The Kerala team was captained by Jijo Joseph under head coach Bino George, being unbeaten during the tournament.

== Statistics and records ==
=== Season-by-season ===
As of 15 February 2024

Champions Runners-up Semifinal

Season	Santosh Trophy							Qualifiers						Top Scorer	
Season	Pld	W	D	L	GF	GA	Pos	Pld	W	D	L	GF	GA	Player	Goals
1946–47	1	0	0	1	1	3	First round							Govindan	1
1959–60	3	0	1	2	1	9	Final round	3	1	2	0	2	1		
1963–64	1	0	0	1	0	3	First round								
1968–69	1	0	0	1	0	3	First round								
1969–70	1	0	0	1	1	7	First round							Joseph Raju	1
1973–74	6	5	1	0	18	8	Champions							TKS Mani	7
1981–82	—N/a	—N/a	—N/a	2	—N/a	—N/a	Semifinal							Appukuttan	9
1983–84	—N/a	—N/a	—N/a	—N/a	—N/a	—N/a	Semifinal							Ranjith	6
1984–85	2	1	1	0	5	0	Preliminary league							5 players	1
1985–86	4	2	0	2	6	3	Semifinal								
1986–87	3	1	2	0	3	2	Semifinal								
1987–88	6	4	2	0	10	1	Runners Up							C. V. Pappachan	5
1988–89	—N/a	—N/a	—N/a	—N/a	—N/a	—N/a	Runners up							—N/a	—N/a
1989–90	6	3	1	2	11	9	Runners Up							I. M. Vijayan, Santosh	3
1990–91	—N/a	—N/a	—N/a	—N/a	—N/a	—N/a	Runners Up							—N/a	—N/a
1991–92	4	3	0	1	12	0	Champions							PS Asheem, Harshan, Rajeev	3
1992–93	6	4	0	1	8	3	Champions							I. M. Vijayan	3
1993–94	2	1	0	1	6	1	Runners Up							Jo Paul Ancheri	3
1994–95	—N/a	—N/a	—N/a	—N/a	—N/a	—N/a	Semifinal								
1995–96	—N/a	—N/a	—N/a	—N/a	—N/a	—N/a	Semifinal								
1996–97	4	2	1	1	6	1	Semifinal							VP Shaji	3
1997–98	3	0	2	1	0	3	Group Stage							—N/a	—N/a
1998–99	1	0	0	1	1	3	Semifinal	2	2	0	0	5	1	Asif Saheer	3
1999–00	5	3	1	1	10	5	Runners up							Asif Saheer	4
2001–02	4	4	0	0	16	8	Champions							Abdul Hakim	7
2002–03	4	3	0	1	10	7	Runners Up							Sylvester Ignatius	3
2004–05	4	3	1	0	9	4	Champions							Abdul Naushad	2
2005–06	3	2	0	1	4	1	Semifinal							Abdul Hakkim	2
2006–07	4	2	2	0	5	1	Semifinal							Pradeep	3
2007–08	3	1	2	0	3	9	Group Stage							Asif Saheer; Abdul Naushad; Javed OK	1
2008–09	1	0	0	1	0	1	Pre Quarter	2	2	0	0	8	0	Zubair KP	3
2009–10	1	0	0	1	0	1	Pre Quarter	3	3	0	0	18	3	Javed OK	4
2010–11	1	0	1	0	0	0	Pre Quarter	3	2	1	0	8	1	NA	NA
2011–12	5	3	2	0	8	4	Semifinal							Kannan	2
2012–13	5	3	2	0	8	4	Runners Up							Kannan	4
2013–14	4	2	0	2	6	4	Group Stage	4	3	0	1	23	4	NA	NA
2014–15	5	3	1	1	4	4	Semifinal	2	2	0	0	10	0	V P Suhair	3
2015–16	did not qualify							2	1	1	0	3	1	Firos; Seesan; Askhar	1
2016–17	5	2	1	2	11	9	Semifinal	3	2	1	0	6	2	Jobby Justin	5
2017–18	6	5	1	0	18	3	Champions	2	1	1	0	7	0	Rahul KP; Afdal VK; Jithin MS	5
2018–19	did not qualify							3	0	2	1	0	1		
2019–20	Not held due to covid							2	2	0	0	11	0	Emil Benny	3
2021–22	6	4	2	0	19	7	Champions	3	3	0	0	18	1	Jesin TK	12
2022–23	5	2	2	1	9	8	Final Round	5	5	0	0	24	2	Nijo Gilbert	8
2023–24	6	2	3	1	7	5	Quarter Finalist	4	3	0	1	12	2	Nijo Gilbert	

== Players ==
=== Current squad ===
As of 14 January 2026:

No.	Pos.	Player	Date of birth (age)	Caps	Goals	Club
	GK	Alkesh Raj				(All India Football Federation) Kannur Warriors
	GK	Hajmal Sakeer				(All India Football Federation) Calicut
	GK	Muhammed Jaseem				(All India Football Federation)
	DF	Sanju Ganesh				(All India Football Federation) Malappuram
	DF	Ajay Alex				(All India Football Federation) Calicut
	DF	Manoj M	21 August 1996 (age 30)			(All India Football Federation) Calicut
	DF	Bibin Ajayan				(All India Football Federation) Thrissur Magic
	DF	Abdul Badish				(All India Football Federation) Thiruvananthapuram Kombans
	DF	Sandeep S				(All India Football Federation) Kannur Warriors
	DF	Tejas Krishna				(All India Football Federation) Thrissur Magic
	MF	Asif OM				(All India Football Federation) Kannur Warriors
	MF	Arjun V	30 April 1999 (age 27)			(All India Football Federation) Calicut
	MF	Arjun MM				(All India Football Federation) Kannur Warriors
	MF	Viknesh Mariya				(All India Football Federation) Thiruvananthapuram Kombans
	MF	Aboobacker Dilshad				(All India Football Federation) Kannur Warriors
	FW	Muhammed Riyas				(All India Football Federation) Calicut
	FW	Sajeesh E	29 January 1997 (age 29)			(All India Football Federation) Forca Kochi
	FW	Muhammad Ajsal	28 March 2003 (age 23)			(All India Football Federation) Kerala Blasters
	FW	Shijin Thadhayouse	19 December 1996 (age 29)			(All India Football Federation) Kannur Warriors
	FW	Muhammed Ashar				(All India Football Federation) Thiruvananthapuram Kombans
	FW	Muhammed Sinan				(All India Football Federation) Kannur Warriors
	FW	Muhammed Ashique				(All India Football Federation) Calicut

== Current technical staff ==
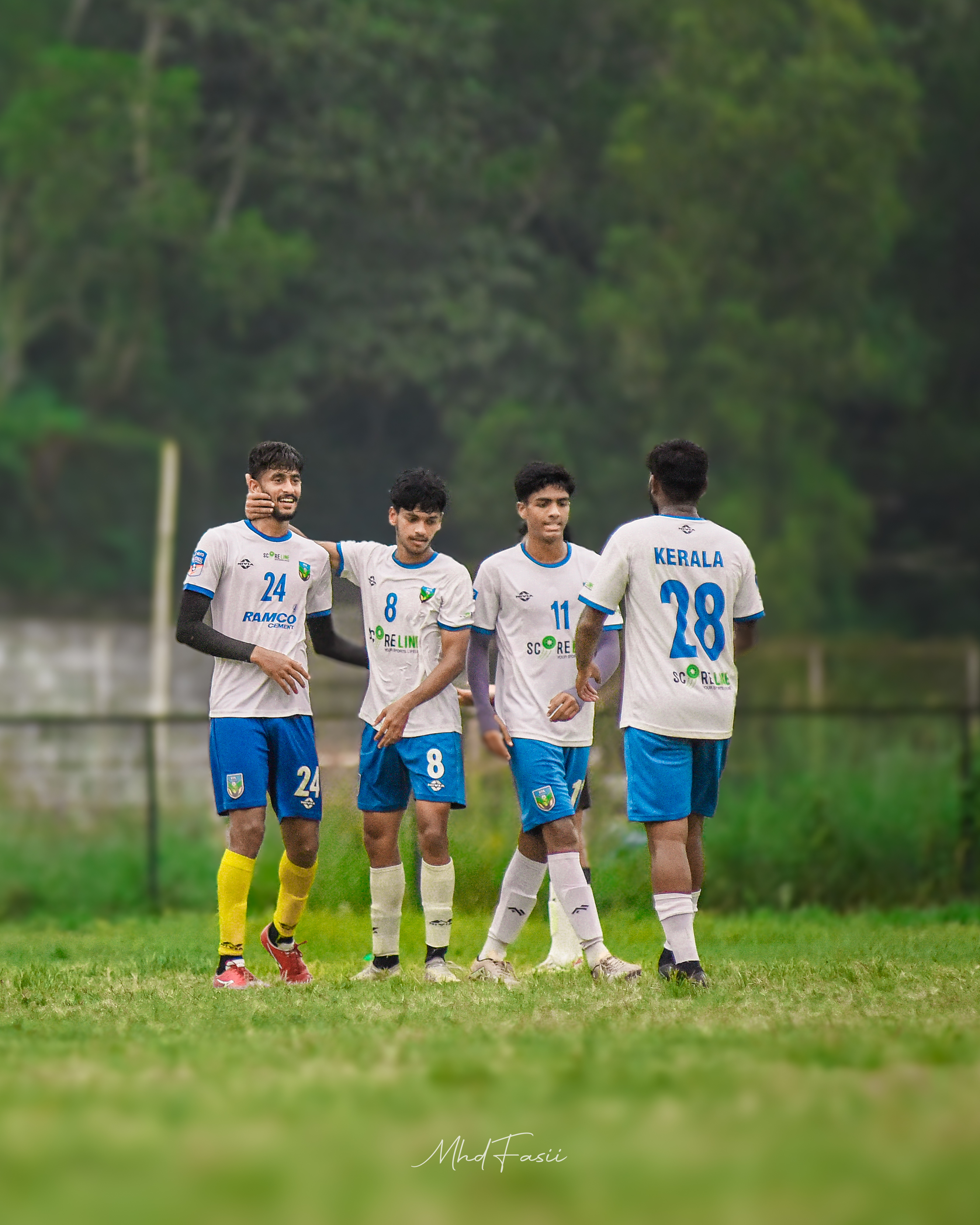
Team players on the ground

As of 14 January 2026

Position	Name
Head coach	(India) Shafeeq Hassan
Assistant coach	(India) Ebin Rose
Goalkeeping coach	(India) Thomas Chacko
Physio	(India) Ahmed Nihal Rasheed
Manager	(India) Shaji PK
Analyst	(India) Kiran K Narayanan

== Results and fixtures ==
11 October 2023 2023–24 Santosh Trophy	Gujarat	0–3	Kerala	Benaulim
09:00			Akbar 12', 33'; Nijo Gilbert 36'	Stadium: SAG Benaulim Ground

13 October 2023 2023–24 Santosh Trophy	Kerala	6–1	Jammu and Kashmir	Benaulim
09:00	Jithin 8', 54'; Sajeesh 13'; Ashiq 45+1'; Abdhu Raheem 66'; Riswan Ali 75'			Stadium: SAG Benaulim Ground

15 October 2023 2023–24 Santosh Trophy	Chhattisgarh	0–3	Kerala	Benaulim
09:00			Sajeesh 6'; Junain 56'; Nijo Gilbert 68'	Stadium: SAG Benaulim Ground

17 October 2023 2023–24 Santosh Trophy	Kerala	0–1	Goa	Benaulim
16:00				Stadium: SAG Benaulim Ground

21 February 2024 2023–24 Santosh Trophy	Assam	1–3	Kerala	Yupia
14:30	Dipu Mirdha 77'	Report	Abdu Raheem K 19' Sajeesh E 67' Nijo Gilbert 90+5'	Stadium: Golden Jubilee Stadium

23 February 2024 2023–24 Santosh Trophy	Goa	2–0	Kerala	Yupia
19:00				Stadium: Golden Jubilee Stadium

25 February 2024 2023–24 Santosh Trophy	Kerala	1–1	Meghalaya	Yupia
14:30				Stadium: Golden Jubilee Stadium

28 February 2024 2023–24 Santosh Trophy	Kerala	2–0	Arunachal Pradesh	Yupia
14:30				Stadium: Golden Jubilee Stadium

01 March 2024 2023–24 Santosh Trophy	Services	1–1	Kerala	Yupia
10:00				Stadium: Golden Jubilee Stadium

20 November 2024 Santosh Trophy Qualification	Kerala	1–0	Railways	Kozhikode
TBD				Stadium: EMS Stadium

22 November 2024 Santosh Trophy Qualification	Kerala	10–0	Lakshadweep	Kozhikode
TBD				Stadium: EMS Stadium

24 November 2024 Santosh Trophy Qualification	Kerala	7–0	Pondicherry	Kozhikode
TBD				Stadium: EMS Stadium

== Honours ==
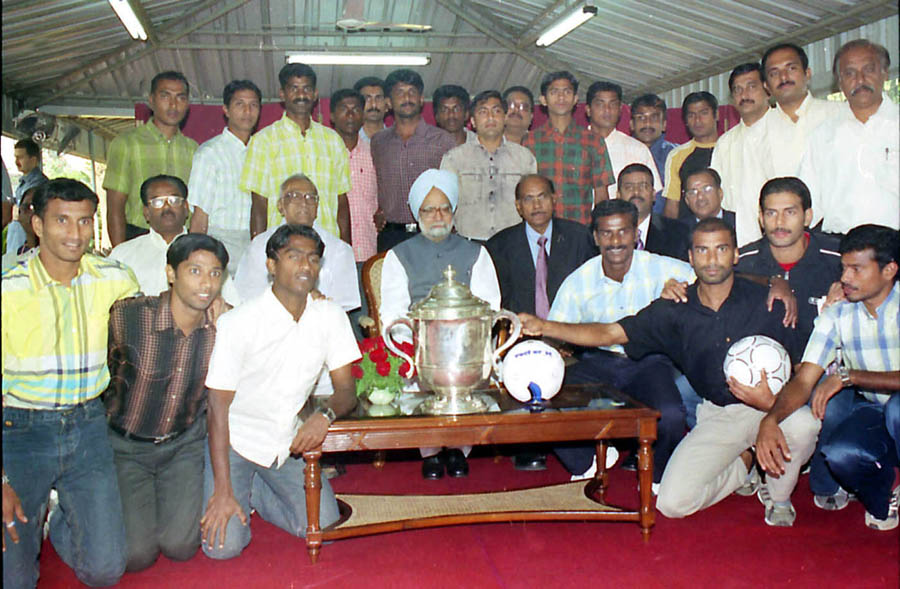
Santosh Trophy winning Kerala team with the Prime Minister Manmohan Singh in New Delhi, November 2, 2004.

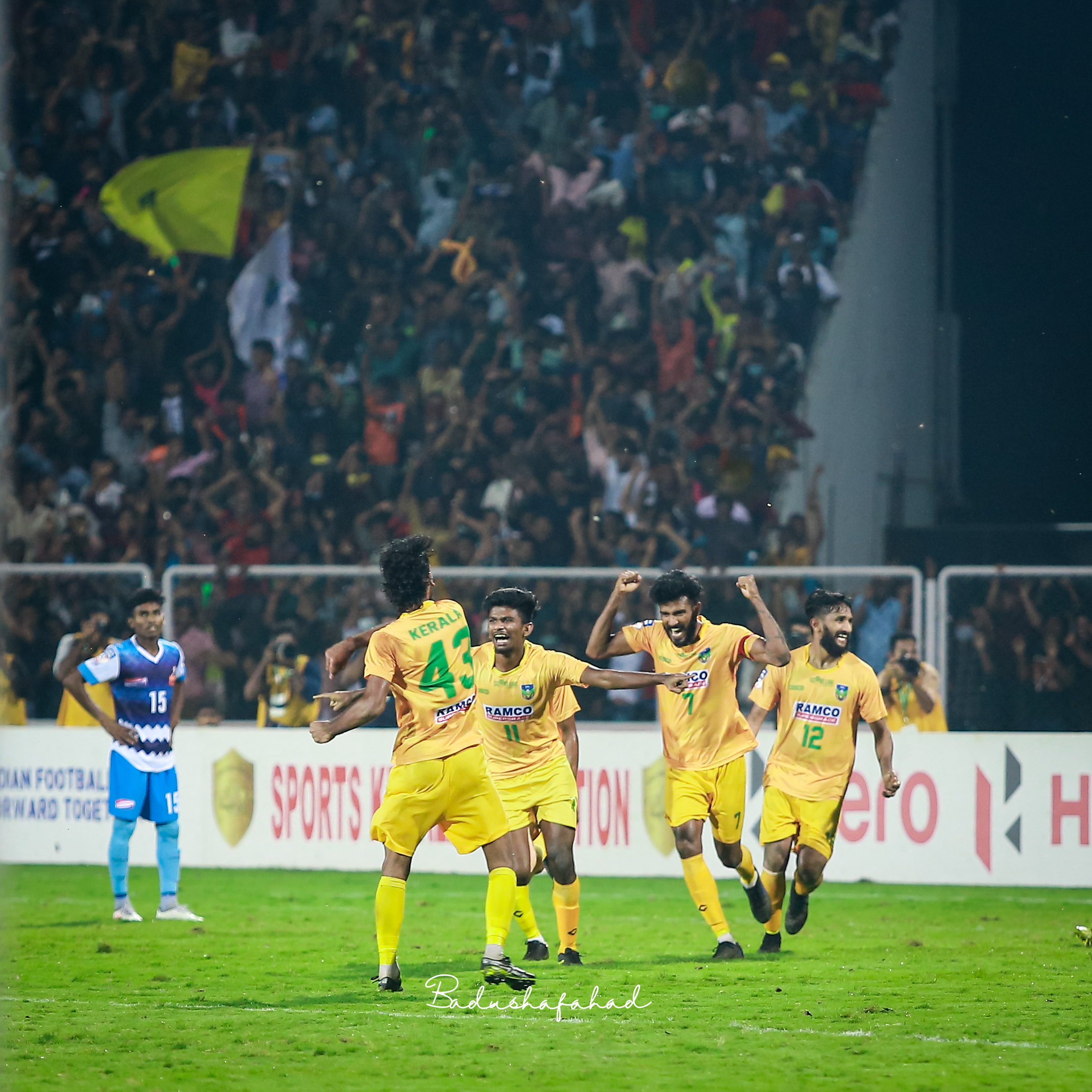
Players of Kerala football team a Santosh Trophy match in Payynad Stadium in 2022

=== State (senior) ===
- Santosh Trophy
  - Winners (7): 1973–74, 1991–92, 1992–93, 2001–02, 2004–05, 2017–18, 2021–2022
  - Runners-up (9): 1987–88, 1988–89, 1989–90, 1990–91, 1993–94, 1999–2000, 2002–03, 2012–13, 2024–25
- National Games
  - Gold medal (3): 1987, 1997, 2025
  - Silver medal (2): 1994, 2022
  - Bronze medal (1): 2023

=== State (youth) ===
- B.C. Roy Trophy
  - Winners (3): 1968–69, 1971–72, 1972–73
  - Runners-up (5): 1973–74, 1974–75, 1979–80, 1981–82, 1985–86
- Mir Iqbal Hussain Trophy
  - Winners (2): 1981–82, 1983–84
- M. Dutta Ray Trophy
  - Winners (1): 1995

=== Others ===
- Sait Nagjee Football Tournament
  - Runners-up (1): 1986
