= Mir Iqbal Hussain Trophy =

Indian football tournament

Sub Junior Boys' National Football Championship
- Founded: 1977; 49 years ago
- Region: India
- Teams: 36
- Current champions: West Bengal (14th title)
- Most championships: West Bengal (14 titles)
- Broadcaster(s): IFA TV (YouTube); SportsKPI
- Website: Sub Junior NFC

The Sub Junior Boys' National Football Championship, also known as Mir Iqbal Hussain Trophy, is an Indian annual football tournament for under-13 teams representing the states of India. It was formerly held for the U-16 age group before being converted into an U-13 tournament from the 2023-24 edition. The tournament was started in 1977 for boys under the age 16 years. The tournament was constituted at the Darjeeling meeting of the AIFF on 12 June 1976. AIFF donated the trophy in the memory of former President of Karnataka State Football Association, Mir Iqbal Hussain.

== Conduct and format ==
From the 2009–10 season onwards, the championship has been sponsored by Coca-Cola and was rechristened as the Coca-Cola MIHT for a period of three years. This also saw a change in the format of the tournament where there are three different levels before the selection of national team. At national level, a total of 12 state teams compete to decide the national winner state.

The 32nd edition of Sub-junior National Football Championship was conducted in 2009 with the new format. Subsequently, tournament has been held from last three years with similar format.

The three levels of the tournament are as explained
1. District Level
The district football association would select a team of 16 players from among all the young footballers to represent the state at zonal level tournament. This would be done through Inter-School competitions conducted between participating school teams in each district.
2. Zonal Level
All the state teams will be divided into 5 zones. The state teams from each zone would play in a tournament at a zonal level. The top 2 teams will qualify for the National finals.
3. National Level
Total 12 teams - 10 teams (2 from each zones) plus the last years winners and the home team would compete at the National finals. Each team would then play in a round robin format. The top four teams with the maximum points would advance to the Semi-Final stage, two of them would progress to the Final Stage. The winning team would be rewarded the Coca-Cola Mir Iqal Hussain Trophy. At the National Finals, AIFF would identify and select 40 of the most promising football talent. These 40 footballers would be groomed by AIFF to become the Official National Under-16 Sub-Junior Team.

== Championship structure ==
The NFC structure was converted into a two tiered championship format from the 2023–24 season. The state associations are eligible to participate in the championship through the two tiers of the competition played across the country.

Sub Junior Boys' National Football Championship
| Tier | Division |
|---|---|
| I | Sub Junior Boys' NFC Tier 1 |
| II | Sub Junior Boys' NFC Tier 2 |

== Results ==
The following is the list of winners and runners-up:

=== Tier 1 ===
| Season | Host | Winner | Score | Runner-up |
|---|---|---|---|---|
| 1977 | Ernakulam | Bengal and Manipur (joint winners) – 0–0 | | |
| 1978 | Coimbatore | Karnataka | 6–0 | Uttar Pradesh |
| 1979 | Guwahati | Assam | 1–0 | Karnataka |
| 1980 | Calcutta | Assam | 1–0 | Uttar Pradesh |
| 1981 | Madras | Assam and Kerala (joint winners) – 0–0, 1–1 | | |
| 1982 | Calicut | Kerala | 1–0 | Assam |
| 1984 | Tiruchirappalli | Bengal and Tamil Nadu (joint winners) – 0–0 | | |
| 1985 | Mysore | Karnataka | 1–0 | Manipur |
| 1986 | Jammu | Jammu and Kashmir | (5–4 p) | Bengal |
| 1987 | Cuttack | Goa | (5–4 p) | Bengal |
| 1988 | Dhanbad | Bengal | 3–0 | Punjab |
| 1989 | Margao | Goa | (3–2 p) | Punjab |
| 1991 | Kota | Rajasthan | 3–0 | Goa |
| 1992 | Malda | Bengal | 3–0 | Orissa |
| 1993 | Hyderabad | Bengal | (4–3 p) | Andhra Pradesh |
| 1994 | Daltonganj | Bihar | 1–0 | Punjab |
| 1995 | Midnapore | Bihar | 0–0 (4–3 p) | Bengal |
| 1996 | Allahabad | Bihar | 2–0 | Mizoram |
| 1997 | Delhi | Bengal | 1–0 | Bihar |
| 1998 | Delhi | Bengal | 1–0 | Tamil Nadu |
| 1999–00 | Midnapore | Bengal | 2–0 | Orissa |
| 2000–01 | Tirunelveli | Bihar | 1–1 (5–4 p) | Bengal |
| 2001–02 | Shillong | Bengal | 1–0 | Mizoram |
| 2002–03 | Neyveli | Bengal | 2–0 | Manipur |
| 2003–04 | Aizawl | Mizoram | 2–0 | Meghalaya |
| 2004–05 | Goa | Mizoram | 2–1 | West Bengal |
| 2005–06 | Jabalpur | Mizoram | 2–1 | West Bengal |
| 2006–07 | Chennai | Bengal | 3–0 | Mizoram |
| 2007–08 | Haldwani | Bengal | 2–1 | Uttar Pradesh |
| 2008–09 | Mahilpur | Mizoram | 1–0 | Punjab |
| 2009 | Haldwani | Uttar Pradesh | 2–1 | West Bengal |
| 2009–10 | Gurugram | Jharkhand | 1–0 | Karnataka |
| 2010 | Mahilpur | Mizoram | 1–0 | Punjab |
| 2010–11 | Kolkata | Jharkhand | 2–1 | Mizoram |
| 2011–12 | Margao | Assam | 2–0 | Chandigarh |
| 2012–13 | Pune | Meghalaya | 1–0 | Orissa |
| 2015–16 | Delhi | West Bengal | 1–0 | Orissa |
| 2016–17 | Calicut | Mizoram | 1–0 | Meghalaya |
| 2017–18 | Hoshiarpur | Meghalaya | 1–1 (3–1 p) | Sports Authority |
| 2018–19 | Naharlagun | Odisha | 0–0 (5–4 p) | Arunachal Pradesh |
| 2019–20 | Kalyani | Meghalaya | 3–0 | Arunachal Pradesh |
| 2020–23 | Not held | | | |
| 2023–24 | Berhampore | Mizoram | 3–0 | Manipur |
| 2024–25 | Bengaluru | Karnataka | 5–1 | Manipur |
| 2025–26 | Amritsar | West Bengal | 3–0 | Delhi |

=== Tier 2 ===
| Season | Host | Winner | Score | Runner-up |
|---|---|---|---|---|
| 2023–24 | Anantapur | Bihar | 1–0 | Delhi |
| 2024–25 | Jorhat | Assam | 11–0 | Haryana |
| 2025–26 | Narayanpur | Tamil Nadu | 2–1 | Telangana |

== See also ==
- List of football clubs in India
- India national football team
- India women's national football team
- India national under-19 football team
- India national under-20 football team
- India national under-23 football team
- M. Dutta Ray Trophy
- BC Roy Trophy
