= 1997–98 Santosh Trophy =

National Football Championship

Tournament details
- Country: India
- Dates: 16–27 April 1998
- Teams: 8

Final positions
- Champions: Bengal (28th title)
- Runners-up: Goa

Tournament statistics
- Top goal scorer(s): Srikanta Dutta (4); Francis Silveira (4)

Awards
- Best player: Rajesh Kumar (Punjab)
- Best goalkeeper: Prasanta Dora (Bengal)

The 1997–98 Santosh Trophy was the 54th edition of the Santosh Trophy, the main State competition for football in India. It was held between 16 and 27 April 1998 in Guwahati, Assam. In the final, Bengal beat Goa 1–0 in a repeat of the previous edition's final. It was their fifth consecutive win and 28th overall.

== Group stage ==
=== Group A ===
Pos	Team	Pld	W	D	L	GF	GA	GD	Pts	Qualification
1	Punjab	3	2	1	0	0	5	−5	7	Advance to Semi-finals
2	Goa	3	1	2	0	5	4	+1	5	Advance to Semi-finals
3	Assam	3	1	1	1	5	4	+1	4	
4	Services	3	0	0	3	2	7	−5	0	

Updated to match(es) played on unknown. Source: indianfootball.de
Rules for classification: 1) points; 2) goal difference; 3) goals scored; 4) head-to-head result.

17 April 1998	Punjab	2–1	Assam	Nehru Stadium, Guwahati
		Report

April 1998	Services	2–4	Punjab	Nehru Stadium, Guwahati

April 1998	Services	0–2	Assam	Nehru Stadium, Guwahati

April 1998	Services	0–1	Goa	Nehru Stadium, Guwahati

April 1998	Assam	2–2	Goa	Nehru Stadium, Guwahati

April 1998	Punjab	2–2	Goa	Nehru Stadium, Guwahati

=== Group B ===
Pos	Team	Pld	W	D	L	GF	GA	GD	Pts	Qualification
1	Maharashtra	3	2	0	1	7	2	+5	6	Advance to Semi-finals
2	Bengal	3	1	2	0	2	1	+1	5	Advance to Semi-finals
3	Kerala	3	0	2	1	0	3	−3	2	
4	Railways	3	0	2	1	0	3	−3	2	

Updated to match(es) played on unknown. Source: indianfootball.de
Rules for classification: 1) points; 2) goal difference; 3) goals scored; 4) head-to-head result.

16 April 1998	Railways	0–0	Kerala	Nehru Stadium, Guwahati
		Report		Attendance: 100

April 1998	Maharashtra	3–0	Railways	Nehru Stadium, Guwahati

April 1998	Maharashtra	3–0	Kerala	Nehru Stadium, Guwahati

17 April 1998	Maharashtra	1–2	Bengal	Nehru Stadium, Guwahati
	Subir Sinha 20' (pen.)	Report	Srikanta Dutta 12', ?'	Referee: M. Sridharan

April 1998	Bengal	0–0	Kerala	Nehru Stadium, Guwahati

April 1998	Railways	0–0	Bengal	Nehru Stadium, Guwahati

== Knockout stage ==
=== Semi-finals ===
April 1998

Bengal	2–1	Punjab
Bhutia 2'; Srikanta Dutta 55'	Report	H. Singh 87'

Nehru Stadium, Guwahati
April 1998

Goa	1–0 (a.e.t.)	Maharashtra
Francis Silveira 115'	Report

Nehru Stadium, Guwahati

=== Final ===
Bengal and Goa headed into their fifth Santosh Trophy final with the former winning every previous encounter, except the 1982–83 edition when the two were declared joint winners.

27 April 1998

Bengal	1–0	Goa
Srikanta Dutta 40'	Report

Nehru Stadium, Guwahati

== Awards ==
Winners Bengal won a cash prize of ₹2.5 lakh, while runners-up Goa received ₹1.5 lakh. The losing semi-finalists Maharashtra and Punjab received ₹1 lakh each. The awards included:

- Top-scorers: Srikanta Dutta (Bengal), Francis Silveira (Goa); four goals each
- Best goalkeeper: Prasanta Dora (Bengal)
- Best player: Rajesh Kumar (Punjab)
- Fairplay Trophy: Punjab
