= 1992–93 Santosh Trophy =

National Football Championship

Tournament details
- Country: India

Final positions
- Champions: Kerala (3rd title)
- Runners-up: Maharashtra

The 1992–93 Santosh Trophy was the 49th edition of the Santosh Trophy, the main State competition for football in India. Kerala retained the title defeating Maharashtra 2–0 in the final at the Maharaja's College Ground in Kochi.

== Quarter-final ==
=== Group A ===
Pos	Team	Pld	W	D	L	GF	GA	GD	Pts	Qualification
1	Kerala	3	2	0	1	5	3	+2	4	Advance to Semi-finals
2	Maharashtra	3	2	0	1	4	2	+2	4	Advance to Semi-finals
3	Tamil Nadu	3	2	0	1	6	5	+1	4	
4	Railways	3	0	0	3	3	8	−5	0	

Source: RSSF
Rules for classification: 1) points; 2) goal difference; 3) goals scored;
17 February 1993

Tamil Nadu	2–1	Maharashtra
Nicholas 33'; Grand Duraipandian 37'		PJ Jose ?'

18 February 1993

Kerala	3–1	Railways
Sanat Pakira (og) 12'; I. M. Vijayan ?', 44'		Nanda Pradan 23'

21 February 1993

Maharashtra	1–0	Kerala
Santosh Kashyap 64'

22 February 1993

Tamil Nadu	3–2	Railways
Grand Duraipandian 15', 67'; Mohammed Al Akber 19'		Moidul Islam 20'; Abdul Khaleeq 56'

25 February 1993

Maharashtra	2–0	Railways
Chris Fernandes 57'; Akeel Ansari 69'

unknown date

Kerala	2–1	Tamil Nadu

=== Group B ===
Pos	Team	Pld	W	D	L	GF	GA	GD	Pts	Qualification
1	Bengal	3	2	1	0	5	1	+4	5	Advance to Semi-finals
2	Karnataka	3	1	1	1	2	2	0	3	Advance to Semi-finals
3	Punjab	3	0	2	1	2	4	−2	2	
4	Goa	3	1	0	2	4	6	−2	2	

Source: RSSF
Rules for classification: 1) points; 2) goal difference; 3) goals scored;
15 February 1993

Bengal	3–0	Goa

16 February 1993

Karnataka	0–0	Punjab

19 February 1993

Bengal	1–1	Punjab
Mushtaq Ali 39'		Majinder 80'

20 February 1993

Karnataka	2–1	Goa
Santosh Kumar 55'; Saravanan 77'		Trevor Antao

23 February 1993

Bengal	1–0	Karnataka
Swarup Das 57'

24 February 1993

Goa	3–1	Punjab
Roy Barreto 8', 83', 87'		Kiran Khongsai 54'

== Semifinal ==
27 February 1993

Kerala	1–0	Karnataka
I. M. Vijayan 82'

Maharajas College Ground, Kochi
Referee: Gulab Singh Chauhan; RD Sow, YN Pandit (linesmen)
28 February 1993

Maharashtra	3–2	Bengal
Godfrey Pereira 43'; Anil Kumar 54', 89'		Satyajit Chatterjee 8'; Swarup Das 44'

Maharajas College Ground, Kochi

== Final ==
2 March 1993

Kerala	2–0	Maharashtra
Ajit Kumar 26'; Pappachan 63'	Report

Maharajas College Ground, Kochi
Referee: Gulab Singh Chouhan; R.D. Sow, Y.N. Pandit (linesmen)
