= Sudip Chatterjee (footballer) =

Indian footballer

Personal information
- Full name: Sudip Chatterjee
- Date of birth: 5 February 1959
- Place of birth: Shibpur, Howrah, West Bengal, India
- Date of death: 18 September 2006 (aged 47)
- Place of death: Howrah, India
- Position: Central midfielder

Senior career*
Years	Team	Apps	(Gls)
Till 1981	Sahajatri Club, Howrah	?	(?)
1981–1982	Bengal Nagpur Railway	?	(?)
1982–1983	Mohun Bagan	?	(?)
1984–1987	East Bengal Club	?	(9)
1988–1989	Mohun Bagan	?	(?)
1990–1991	East Bengal Club	?	(5)
1991–1992	Mohun Bagan	?	(?)

International career^{‡}
1981–1992	India	?	(?)

Managerial career
- 1996–1998: Bengal
- 1997: Mohammedan Sporting Club
- * Club domestic league appearances and goals as of 28 April 2008 ‡ National team caps and goals as of 28 April 2008

Sudip Chatterjee (15 December 1959 – 18 September 2006), nicknamed Tulu, was an Indian international football player and coach. He started his career as a centre back and then moved to the right back position before switching to the midfielder role. As a midfielder, he was considered among the finest players in Indian football. He also managed Bengal in Santosh Trophy and won the 1998–99 edition.

== Playing career ==
Sudip started his playing career with Howrah Sahajatri Club, where his skills were spotted by former India international Arun Ghosh. In 1981, he signed for Calcutta 1st Division league team Bengal Nagpur Railway (BNR) Club. After spending a season with BNR, he joined Kolkata giant Mohun Bagan in 1982. After two seasons with Mohun Bagan, Chatterjee moved to Bagan's arch rival East Bengal Club in 1984. While at East Bengal, Sudip was shifted to Central Midfield by the then coach of the club, Amal Dutta. Sudip remained with East Bengal till 1987. During his stay with East Bengal, he was adjudged the player of the year by the AIFF in 1986. He joined Mohun Bagan again in 1988 and played for them in the corresponding two seasons. In 1990, he returned to East Bengal for a one-year stint. Sudip finally returned to Mohun Bagan in 1991 and retired at the end of 1992 season.

== International career ==
After his 1982 debut with Mohun Bagan as a Central Defender, Sudip was included in the Indian Team for 1982 Asian Games. He was a very dependable member of the Indian Football Team till his retirement in 1992. Sudip represented India in Asian Games, Asia Cup, Pre-World Cup, Pre-Olympic, Merdeka Cup, SAF Games and Nehru Gold Cup. He captained India in SAF Games(1985), Pre-World Cup(1986), Asian Games (1986), Merdeka Cup(1986), Nehru Gold Cup(1985 & 1988) and Asia Cup(1988). 1992 Asia Cup was his last International tournament.

== Personal life ==
Sudip is the eldest son of Chatterjee family of Howrah Chatterjeehat area in Shibpur.Chatterjee used to live at Mandirtala, Howrah, the twin city of Kolkata. After his retirement from football due to ill health, he was subsequently also diagnosed with dementia. On 18 September 2006, a piece of guava choked his respiratory tract and he suffered a cardiac arrest. He was declared dead after being rushed to a nearby hospital. Chatterjee is survived by his wife, a son and a daughter.

== Honours ==
=== Player ===
India

- South Asian Games Gold medal: 1985; Bronze medal: 1989

Mohun Bagan

- IFA Shield: 1989
- Sikkim Gold Cup: 1989
- All Airlines Gold Cup: 1989
- Calcutta Football League: 1992

East Bengal

- Durand Cup: 1990
- IFA Shield: 1990
- Rovers Cup: 1990

Bengal

- Santosh Trophy: 1981-82, 1986-87, 1988-89

=== Manager ===
Bengal

- Santosh Trophy: 1995–96, 1996–97, 1997–98

=== Individual ===
- Awarded Player of the Decade by AIFF in 1994
- Awarded Player of the Year by AIFF in 1986

== See also ==
- List of India national football team captains
