= 1981–82 Santosh Trophy =

National Football Championship

Tournament details
- Country: India
- Dates: 1–31 January 1982

Final positions
- Champions: Bengal (20th title)
- Runners-up: Railways

Tournament statistics
- Top goal scorer(s): Biswajit Bhattacharya (Bengal) & Appukuttan (Kerala) (9 goals)

The 1981–82 Santosh Trophy was the 38th edition of the Santosh Trophy, the main State competition for football in India. It was held in Corporation Stadium, Trichur (now Thrissur), Kerala. Bengal beat Railways 2–0 in the final.

== Quarter-finals ==
This is an incomplete list of matches reconstructed from articles about the tournament.

=== Group A ===
Kerala	2–0	Andhra Pradesh
Appukuttan; Jacob

Bengal	1–0	Maharashtra
Biswajit Bhattacharya 63'

22 January 1982

Kerala	2–0	Maharashtra
Vijayakumar

Bengal	3–0	Kerala
Biswajit Bhattacharya; Prasanta Banerjee

Attendance: 60,000

=== Group B ===
Karnataka	3–0	Bihar
Ravikumar; Mani 49'

Karnataka	2–2	Punjab
Mani		Kultar; Balwinder

Railways	2–1	Bihar
Inbanathan; Sekhar Chakraborty		Murmu 67'

Railways	2–1	Punjab
Monojit Das; Ravi Kumar (o.g.)		Balwinder

Karnataka	0–0	Railways

== Semi-finals ==
Team 1	Agg.	Team 2	1st leg	2nd leg
Bengal	3–0	Karnataka	0–0	3–0
Railways	2–1	Kerala	1–0	1–1

=== Matches ===
26 January 1982

Bengal	0–0	Karnataka

Thrissur Municipal Corporation Stadium, Thrissur

Bengal	3–0	Karnataka
Prasanta Banerjee

Thrissur Municipal Corporation Stadium, Thrissur

Bengal won 3–0 on aggregate.

Railways	1–0	Kerala

Thrissur Municipal Corporation Stadium, Thrissur

Railways	1–1	Kerala

Thrissur Municipal Corporation Stadium, Thrissur

Railways won 2–1 on aggregate.

== Final ==
31 January 1982

Bengal	2–0	Railways
Biswajit Bhattacharya

Thrissur Municipal Corporation Stadium, Thrissur
