= 1990–91 Santosh Trophy =

National Football Championship

Tournament details
- Country: India
- Venue(s): Indira Gandhi Municipal Stadium, Palakkad, Kerala (final round)
- Dates: 14 February 1991 – 10 March 1991
- Teams: 10

Final positions
- Champions: Maharashtra (2nd title)
- Runner-up: Kerala

Tournament statistics
- Matches played: 23

The 1990–91 Santosh Trophy was the 47th edition of the Santosh Trophy, the main State competition for football in India. It was held in Palakkad, Kerala. Maharashtra defeated Kerala 1–0 in the final to win the competition for the second time. Kerala finished second for the fourth straight year.

The age restriction of 23 years was continued for this edition but removed from 1991–92. A separate tournament was started for that age group.

Matches were held in four zones and eight teams qualified for the final round in Palakkad. Goa and Kerala received direct qualification as the finalists of 1989–90.

== Final ==
10 March 1991

Maharashtra	1–0	Kerala

Indira Gandhi Municipal Stadium, Palakkad
