= B. C. Roy Trophy =

Indian football tournament

Junior Boys' National Football Championship
- Founded: 1962; 64 years ago
- Region: India
- Teams: 36
- Current champions: Manipur (3rd title)
- Most championships: West Bengal (18 titles)
- Broadcaster: SportsKPI (YouTube)
- Website: Junior NFC
- 2026–27

The Junior Boys' National Football Championship, also known as BC Roy Trophy, is an Indian football tournament held for players under-15 years of age representing the states of India. It was formerly held for the U-19 age group before being converted into an U-15 tournament from the 2023-24 edition. The participants in the annual competition are teams representing state associations of India under the All India Football Federation (AIFF). The tournament was instituted by the AIFF in 1962, with the Indian Football Association presenting the trophy in memory of former West Bengal Chief Minister Bidhan Chandra Roy.

== Championship structure ==
The NFC structure was converted into a two tiered championship format from the 2023–24 season. The state associations are eligible to participate in the championship through the two tiers of the competition played across the country.

Junior Boys' National Football Championship
| Tier | Division |
|---|---|
| I | Junior Boys' NFC Tier 1 |
| II | Junior Boys' NFC Tier 2 |

== Results ==
The following is the list of winners and runners-up of the championship:

=== Tier 1 ===
| Season | Host | Winner | Score | Runner-up |
|---|---|---|---|---|
| 1962 | Burnpur | Bengal | 5–0 | Orissa |
| 1963 | Allahabad | Delhi and Mysore (joint winners), 2–2 | | |
| 1964 | Ajmer | Rajasthan | 3–1 | Assam |
| 1965 | Cuttack | Delhi | 1–0 | Andhra Pradesh |
| 1966 | Bengaluru | Andhra Pradesh | 2–0 | Mysore |
| 1967 | Kozhikode | Bengal | 1–1, 2–0 | Maharashtra |
| 1968 | Jabalpur | Bengal | 2–0 | Andhra Pradesh |
| 1969 | Cuttack | Orissa and Kerala (joint winners), 0–0 | | |
| 1970 | Jorhat | Bengal | 2–0 | Assam |
| 1972 | Kollam | Kerala | 4–0 | Karnataka |
| 1973 | Krishnanagar | Kerala | 2–0 | Andhra Pradesh |
| 1974 | Coimbatore | Bengal | 1–0 | Kerala |
| 1975 | Imphal | Bengal | 1–0 | Kerala |
| 1976 | Srinagar | Andhra Pradesh | 1–0 | Bengal |
| 1977 | Cuttack | Bengal | 1–0 | Orissa |
| 1978 | Agartala | Bengal | 2–1 | Andhra Pradesh |
| 1979 | Cuttack | Karnataka | 1–0 | Andhra Pradesh |
| 1980 | Ernakulam | Goa | 2–0 | Kerala |
| 1981 | Agartala | Bengal and Railways (joint winners), 0–0 | | |
| 1982 | Pondicherry | Bengal | 1–0 | Kerala |
| 1983 | Goa | Goa | 2–0 | Punjab |
| 1984 | Jorhat | Bengal | (4–3 p) | Goa |
| 1985 | Agartala | Bengal | 3–1 | Assam |
| 1986 | Coimbatore | Punjab | (5–4 p) | Kerala |
| 1987 | Dibrugarh | Bengal | 2–0 | Railways |
| 1988 | Palghat | Railways | 1–0 | Bengal |
| 1989 | Shillong | Railways and Meghalaya (joint winners), 0–0 | | |
| 1990 | Sambalpur | Bengal | 2–1 | Goa |
| 1992 | Aizawl | Karnataka | 0–0 (5–3 p) | Manipur |
| 1993 | Jammu | Punjab | (4–2 p) | Andhra Pradesh |
| 1994–95 | Shillong | Bengal | 2–0 | Punjab |
| 1995–96 | Midnapore | Bengal | 4–0 | Mizoram |
| 1996–97 | Mandi | Bihar | 0–0 (5–4 p) | Assam |
| 1998–99 | Imphal | Manipur | 4–1 | Sikkim |
| 1999–00 | Bengaluru | Manipur | 1–0 (a.s.d.e.t.) | Bengal |
| 2000–01 | Thiruvananthapuram | Bihar | 3–1 | Manipur |
| 2001–02 | Jaipur/Jodhpur | Punjab | 1–0 | Goa |
| 2002–03 | Thrissur | Karnataka | 1–0 (a.s.d.e.t.) | Goa |
| 2003–04 | Giridih | Bengal | 2–0 | Karnataka |
| 2004–05 | Aizawl | Jharkhand | 2–1 | Manipur |
| 2005–06 | Varanasi | Jharkhand | 1–1 (4–2 p) | Goa |
| 2006–07 | Bhilai | Jharkhand | 1–1, 1–0 (a.e.t.) | West Bengal |
| 2007–08 | Gurgaon/Faridabad | Haryana | 1–0 | West Bengal |
| 2008–09 | Bhilai | Jharkhand | 2–1 | Manipur |
| 2009–10 | Kolkata | Chandigarh | 1–1 (6–5 p) | West Bengal |
| 2010–11 | Kolkata | Chandigarh | 1–1 (6–5 p) | West Bengal |
| 2015–16 | Hoshiarpur | Punjab | 1–1 (4–2 p) | Mizoram |
| 2016–17 | Bhilai | Punjab | 3–0 | Mizoram |
| 2017–18 | Hoshiarpur | Uttar Pradesh | 1–0 | West Bengal |
| 2018–19 | Cuttack | Mizoram | 1–0 | Punjab |
| 2019–20 | Shillong | Mizoram | 1–1 (5–4 p) | Punjab |
| 2020–23 | Not held | | | |
| 2023–24 | Bhubaneswar | Uttar Pradesh | 2–1 | West Bengal |
| 2024–25 | Narayanpur | West Bengal | 2–0 | Odisha |
| 2025–26 | Amritsar | Manipur | 3–0 | West Bengal |

=== Tier 2 ===
| Season | Host | Winner | Score | Runner-up |
|---|---|---|---|---|
| 2023–24 | Jabalpur | Delhi | 3–2 | Chandigarh |
| 2024–25 | Nagaon | Telangana | 1–1 (4–2 p) | Manipur |
| 2025–26 | Amritsar | Uttar Pradesh | 3–0 | Assam |

== See also ==
- Elite League
- RFD Youth League
- Subroto Cup
- Indian Arrows
- AIFF Elite Academy
- Football in India
- Indian football league system
- History of Indian football
- State football leagues in India
