= 2024–25 Santosh Trophy =

Senior Men's National Football Championship

Tournament details
- Country: India
- Venues: 10 (in 9 host cities): Group stage: Various; Finals: Hyderabad, Telangana
- Dates: 15 November – 31 December 2024
- Teams: 38

Final positions
- Champions: West Bengal (33rd title)
- Runners-up: Kerala

Tournament statistics
- Matches played: 88
- Goals scored: 316 (3.59 per match)
- Top goal scorer: Robi Hansda (12 goals)

Awards
- Best player: Robi Hansda (West Bengal)

The 2024–25 Santosh Trophy was the 78th edition of the Santosh Trophy, the premier competition in India for senior men's football teams representing their respective states/union territories and government institutions.

== Venues ==
The All India Football Federation (AIFF) announced in October 2024 that the group stage matches would begin the following month and would be played in six venues. The venues and the corresponding groups that would play there were named. Hosts Telangana and last year's finalists, Services and Goa were exempted from playing the group stage fixtures. Hyderabad is hosting the event for the first time in 57 years.

Group	City	Stadium	Capacity
A	Amritsar	GNDU Sports Complex	–
B	Phagwara	Bibi Ratni Sports Stadium	–
C	Kalyani	Kalyani Stadium	20,000
D	Agartala	Umakanta Mini Stadium	5,000
E	Nalbari	Deshbhakta Maidan	–
F	Amritsar	GNDU Sports Complex	–
G	Anantapur	RDT Stadium	5,000
H	Kozhikode	EMS Corporation Stadium	50,000
I	Jaipur	Royal FC Stadium	–
Final round, QFs	Hyderabad	Deccan Arena	1,500
SFs, Final	Hyderabad	GMC Balayogi Athletic Stadium	18,000

== Draws ==
38 teams entered the competition; Service and Goa, the finalists of the previous edition, and Telangana, the hosts received direct entry to the final round. The remaining 35 teams were divided into one group of three teams and eight groups of four teams each. It was announced that the winners of each group would make the final round.

The draw for the final round was held on 30 November 2024.

== Group stage ==
=== Group A ===
Pos	Team	Pld	W	D	L	GF	GA	GD	Pts	Qualification	JK	PB	LD	HP
1	Jammu and Kashmir	3	3	0	0	10	1	+9	9	Final round		1–0	5–0	
2	Punjab (H)	3	1	1	1	8	2	+6	4				1–1	
3	Ladakh	3	1	1	1	3	7	−4	4					2–1
4	Himachal Pradesh	3	0	0	3	2	13	−11	0		1–4	0–7		

Source: AIFF
Rules for classification: 1) points; 2) head-to-head points; 3) head-to-head goal difference; 4) goal difference; 5) number of goals scored; 6) drawing of lots
(H) Hosts

=== Group B ===
Pos	Team	Pld	W	D	L	GF	GA	GD	Pts	Qualification	DL	UK	HR	CH
1	Delhi	3	3	0	0	12	1	+11	9	Final round		4–1		
2	Uttarakhand	3	2	0	1	9	5	+4	6				4–1	
3	Haryana	3	1	0	2	2	6	−4	3		0–2			1–0
4	Chandigarh	3	0	0	3	0	11	−11	0		0–6	0–4		

Source: AIFF
Rules for classification: 1) points; 2) head-to-head points; 3) head-to-head goal difference; 4) goal difference; 5) number of goals scored; 6) drawing of lots

=== Group C ===
Pos	Team	Pld	W	D	L	GF	GA	GD	Pts	Qualification	WB	BR	UP	JH
1	West Bengal (H)	3	2	1	0	11	0	+11	7	Final round		0–0	7–0	
2	Bihar	3	1	1	1	5	6	−1	4					3–5
3	Uttar Pradesh	3	1	0	2	3	10	−7	3 (Note: Head-to-head points: Uttar Pradesh 3; Jharkhand 0.)			1–2		2–1
4	Jharkhand	3	1	0	2	6	9	−3	3		0–4			

Source: AIFF
Rules for classification: 1) points; 2) head-to-head points; 3) head-to-head goal difference; 4) goal difference; 5) number of goals scored; 6) drawing of lots
(H) Hosts

=== Group D ===
Pos	Team	Pld	W	D	L	GF	GA	GD	Pts	Qualification	MN	TR	MZ	SK
1	Manipur	3	3	0	0	10	2	+8	9	Final round				6–1
2	Tripura (H)	3	1	1	1	4	3	+1	4		0–2		4–1	
3	Mizoram	3	1	0	2	9	6	+3	3		1–2			
4	Sikkim	3	0	1	2	1	13	−12	1			0–0	0–7	

Source: AIFF
Rules for classification: 1) points; 2) head-to-head points; 3) head-to-head goal difference; 4) goal difference; 5) number of goals scored; 6) drawing of lots
(H) Hosts

=== Group E ===
Pos	Team	Pld	W	D	L	GF	GA	GD	Pts	Qualification	ML	AS	AR	NL
1	Meghalaya	3	2	1	0	8	4	+4	7	Final round			4–3	
2	Assam (H)	3	1	1	1	6	3	+3	4		1–1			1–2
3	Arunachal Pradesh	3	1	0	2	7	11	−4	3 (Note: Head-to-head points: Arunachal Pradesh 3; Nagaland 0.)			0–4		4–3
4	Nagaland	3	1	0	2	5	8	−3	3		0–3			

Source: AIFF
Rules for classification: 1) points; 2) head-to-head points; 3) head-to-head goal difference; 4) goal difference; 5) number of goals scored; 6) drawing of lots
(H) Hosts

=== Group F ===
Pos	Team	Pld	W	D	L	GF	GA	GD	Pts	Qualification	OD	CG	MP
1	Odisha	2	2	0	0	10	2	+8	6	Final round			6–1
2	Chhattisgarh	2	1	0	1	5	4	+1	3		1–4		
3	Madhya Pradesh	2	0	0	2	1	10	−9	0			1–4	

Source: AIFF
Rules for classification: 1) points; 2) head-to-head points; 3) head-to-head goal difference; 4) goal difference; 5) number of goals scored; 6) drawing of lots

=== Group G ===
Pos	Team	Pld	W	D	L	GF	GA	GD	Pts	Qualification	TN	KA	AN	AP
1	Tamil Nadu	3	3	0	0	17	1	+16	9	Final round			7–0	8–0
2	Karnataka	3	2	0	1	17	2	+15	6		1–2		11–0	
3	Andaman and Nicobar	3	1	0	2	1	18	−17	3					1–0
4	Andhra Pradesh (H)	3	0	0	3	0	14	−14	0			0–5		

Source: AIFF
Rules for classification: 1) points; 2) head-to-head points; 3) head-to-head goal difference; 4) goal difference; 5) number of goals scored; 6) drawing of lots
(H) Hosts

=== Group H ===
Pos	Team	Pld	W	D	L	GF	GA	GD	Pts	Qualification	KL	RL	PY	LD
1	Kerala (H)	3	3	0	0	18	0	+18	9	Final round		1–0	7–0	
2	Railways	3	2	0	1	11	2	+9	6				10–1	
3	Pondicherry	3	1	0	2	4	19	−15	3					3–2
4	Lakshadweep	3	0	0	3	2	14	−12	0		0–10	0–1		

Source: AIFF
Rules for classification: 1) points; 2) head-to-head points; 3) head-to-head goal difference; 4) goal difference; 5) number of goals scored; 6) drawing of lots
(H) Hosts

=== Group I ===
Pos	Team	Pld	W	D	L	GF	GA	GD	Pts	Qualification	RJ	GJ	MH	DD
1	Rajasthan (H)	3	2	1	0	6	1	+5	7	Final round		0–0		
2	Gujarat	3	1	2	0	3	0	+3	5					3–0
3	Maharashtra	3	1	1	1	4	2	+2	4		1–2	0–0		
4	DNHDD	3	0	0	3	0	10	−10	0		0–4		0–3	

Source: AIFF
Rules for classification: 1) points; 2) head-to-head points; 3) head-to-head goal difference; 4) goal difference; 5) number of goals scored; 6) drawing of lots
(H) Hosts

== Final round ==
=== Qualified teams ===
Direct entrants (3)
Hosts	Telangana
Defending champions	Services
Previous runners-up	Goa

Group	Group winners (9)
A	Jammu and Kashmir
B	Delhi
C	West Bengal
D	Manipur
E	Meghalaya
F	Odisha
G	Tamil Nadu
H	Kerala
I	Rajasthan

=== Group A ===
Pos	Team	Pld	W	D	L	GF	GA	GD	Pts	Qualification	WB	MN	SE	JK	RJ	TG
1	West Bengal	5	4	1	0	9	1	+8	13	Advance to quarter-finals		0–0		3–1		3–0
2	Manipur	5	3	2	0	7	3	+4	11	Advance to quarter-finals			1–0		2–1	
3	Services	5	3	0	2	9	3	+6	9	Advance to quarter-finals	0–1			4–0		3–1
4	Jammu and Kashmir	5	2	1	2	6	8	−2	7	Advance to quarter-finals		1–1			1–0	
5	Rajasthan	5	0	1	4	2	8	−6	1		0–2		0–2			
6	Telangana (H)	5	0	1	4	3	13	−10	1			1–3		0–3	1–1	

Source: AIFF
Rules for classification: 1) points; 2) head-to-head points; 3) head-to-head goal difference; 4) goal difference; 5) number of goals scored; 6) drawing of lots
(H) Hosts

=== Group B ===
Pos	Team	Pld	W	D	L	GF	GA	GD	Pts	Qualification	KL	ML	DL	OD	GA	TN
1	Kerala	5	4	1	0	11	4	+7	13	Advance to quarter-finals		1–0			4–3	1–1
2	Meghalaya	5	2	2	1	5	3	+2	8	Advance to quarter-finals			2–0		1–0	
3	Delhi	5	2	1	2	4	5	−1	7	Advance to quarter-finals	0–3			2–0		2–0
4	Odisha	5	1	2	2	3	5	−2	5	Advance to quarter-finals	0–2	0–0				
5	Goa	5	1	1	3	4	7	−3	4				0–0	0–2		1–0
6	Tamil Nadu	5	0	3	2	4	7	−3	3			2–2		1–1		

Source: AIFF
Rules for classification: 1) points; 2) head-to-head points; 3) head-to-head goal difference; 4) goal difference; 5) number of goals scored; 6) drawing of lots

== Knockout stage ==
=== Bracket ===
Quarter-finals
26 December – Hyderabad (DA)
West Bengal	3
Odisha	1
27 December – Hyderabad (DA)
Meghalaya	1
Services	2
27 December – Hyderabad (DA)
Kerala	1
Jammu and Kashmir	0
26 December – Hyderabad (DA)
Manipur (a.e.t.)	5
Delhi	2

Semi-finals
29 December – Hyderabad (GBAS)
West Bengal	4
Services	2
29 December – Hyderabad (GBAS)
Kerala	5
Manipur	1

Final
31 December – Hyderabad (GBAS)
West Bengal	1
Kerala	0

=== Quarter-finals ===
26 December 2024
14:30

West Bengal	3–1	Odisha
Naro Hari 45+2'; Robi 77'; Manotos 90+2'	Report	Rakesh 25'

Deccan Arena, Hyderabad
Attendance: 150
Referee: Bagavath Sundhar Jee S
Man of the Match: Naro Hari Shrestha (West Bengal)

26 December 2024
19:30

Manipur	5–2 (a.e.t.)	Delhi
LT Lowly 48'; S. Sagar Singh 50'; S. Ragui 97', 105+4' (pen.); K. Zahir Khan 107'	Report	Jaideep Singh 9', 65' (pen.)

Deccan Arena, Hyderabad
Attendance: 300
Referee: Rohan Das Gupta
Man of the Match: Shunjanthan Ragui (Manipur)

27 December 2024
14:30

Kerala	1–0	Jammu and Kashmir
Naseeb 73'	Report

Deccan Arena, Hyderabad
Attendance: 100
Referee: Vishal
Man of the Match: Naseeb Rahman (Kerala)

27 December 2024
19:30

Meghalaya	1–2	Services
O.L. Mawnai 86'	Report	T. Bidhyasagar 33'; R. Ramakrishnan 46'

Deccan Arena, Hyderabad
Attendance: 100
Referee: Bimalendu Mondal
Man of the Match: Navjot Singh (Services)

=== Semi-finals ===
29 December 2024
14:30

West Bengal	4–2	Services
Manotos 17'; Robi 45+2', 90+6'; Naro Hari 45+4'	Report	B. Thapa 53'; Juwel 74' (o.g.)

GMC Balayogi Athletic Stadium, Hyderabad
Attendance: 250
Referee: Akashkumar Kamleshkumar Mehta
Man of the Match: Robi Hansda (West Bengal)

29 December 2024
19:30

Kerala	5–1	Manipur
Naseeb 22'; Ajsal 45+1'; Roshal 73', 88', 90+5'	Report	S. Ragui 30'

GMC Balayogi Athletic Stadium, Hyderabad
Attendance: 1,000
Referee: Jarvish Macwan
Man of the Match: Muhammed Roshal (Kerala)

=== Final ===
31 December 2024
19:30

West Bengal	1–0	Kerala
Robi 90+4'	Report

GMC Balayogi Athletic Stadium, Hyderabad
Attendance: 1,000
Referee: Akashkumar Kamleshkumar Mehta
Man of the Match: Robi Hansda (West Bengal)

== Statistics ==
Rank	Player	Team	Goals
1	Robi Hansda	West Bengal	12
2	Naseeb Rahman	Kerala	8
3	Muhammad Ajsal	Kerala	8
4	Naro Hari Shrestha	West Bengal	7
5	Lijo K	Tamil Nadu	7
6	Aakif Javaid	Jammu and Kashmir	6
7	Nikhil Raj	Karnataka	5
8	Sajeesh E	Kerala	5
9	Kartik Hantal	Odisha	5
Source: AIFF

== Awards ==
The following awards were given out at the end of the tournament: the top scorer, best goalkeeper, player of the tournament and fair play award.

Award	Player	Team
Top scorer	Robi Hansda	West Bengal
Tulsidas Balaram player of the final match	Robi Hansda	West Bengal
Peter Thangaraj player of the championship	Robi Hansda	West Bengal

== Broadcasting ==
Round	Broadcaster(s)	Ref.
Group stage	YouTube	
Group stage	ssen.co, Prasar Bharati	
Final round, knockouts	ssen.co, Prasar Bharati	

== See also ==
- 2024–25 Rajmata Jijabai Trophy
