= Hamilton Bobby =

Indian footballer

Personal information
- Date of death: 10 December 2011 (aged 44)
- Place of death: Kochi, India
- Position: Midfielder

Senior career*
Years	Team	Apps	(Gls)
1993–2000	Tamil Nadu		

International career
- India U16
- India U23
- India
- * Club domestic league appearances and goals

Hamilton Bobby (died 10 December 2011) was an Indian international footballer.

== Career ==
Bobby played for Tamil Nadu between 1992, and 2000, captaining them twice in the Santosh Trophy. He was selected as the best player of the 1992 Santosh Trophy despite missing a penalty kick in Tamil Nadu's loss to Goa in the shootout in the semifinal.

He also represented India at under-16, under-23 and full international level, playing at the President's Cup.

== Personal life ==
He was the younger brother of fellow player Xavier Pius.

He died on 10 December 2011 from a heart attack, aged 44.
