= 1988–89 Santosh Trophy =

National Football Championship

Tournament details
- Country: India
- Venue(s): Assam
- Dates: 5–31 March 1988
- Teams: 10

Final positions
- Champions: Bengal (23rd title)
- Runner-up: Kerala

The 1988–89 Santosh Trophy was the 45th edition of the Santosh Trophy, the main State competition for football in India. It was held in Jorhat, Silchar and Guwahati, in Assam. Bengal defeated Kerala 5–4 in the tie-breaker in the final to win the competition for the 23rd time.

24 teams were divided in six clusters. The top team in each cluster qualified to the quarter final league along with Kerala, Maharastra, Punjab and Karnataka who had qualified for the semifinals the previous year.

== Final ==
31 March 1989

| Bengal | 1–1 (a.e.t.) | Kerala |
|---|---|---|
| Babu Mani | | Ganesan |
Penalties
| | 5–4 |

Guwahati
