= Lakshadweep football team =

Lakshadweep
- Full name: Lakshadweep football team
- Founded: 2017; 9 years ago
- Ground: Various
- Owner: Lakshadweep Football Association
- Head coach: Sreekumar Radha
- League: Santosh Trophy
- 2024–25: Group stage
Home colours	Away colours

The Lakshadweep football team is an Indian football team which represents the union territory of Lakshadweep, India. The team participates in Indian state football competitions including the Santosh Trophy (since the 2016–17 edition).

== History ==
During the All India Football Federation general body meeting on 21 December 2016, it was confirmed that the Lakshadweep Football Association would gain affiliation with India's national football association. After gaining affiliation, the federation began preparations for the 2016–17 Santosh Trophy qualifiers. Majority of the players come from the local Kavaratti League. Their first match occurred on 6 January 2017 when Lakshadweep took on Tamil Nadu. Despite being resilient in defense, Lakshadweep succumbed to a 2–0 defeat. Four days later, on 10 January, Lakshadweep made history by earning their first ever victory in the Santosh Trophy, a 1–0 victory over Telangana. K.P. Ummer was the goalscorer for Lakshadweep.

Despite not qualifying the previous tournament, Lakshadweep returned for the 2017–18 qualifiers. In their first match against Madhya Pradesh the side won 5–0.

== Statistics and records ==
=== Season-by-season ===
As of 17 April 2025

Season	Santosh Trophy								Finals	Top Scorer	
Season	P	W	D	L	GF	GA	Pts	Position	Finals	Player	Goals
2016–17	3	1	0	2	1	6	3	3rd	DNQ	(India) K.P. Ummer	1
2017–18	3	2	0	1	10	5	6	2nd	DNQ	(India) Shafeeq TD	3
2018–19	3	0	1	2	0	5	1	4th	DNQ		
2019–20	4	1	0	3	5	9	3	4th	DNQ	(India) Abdul Nazar & Savad TI	2
2021–22	3	1	1	1	6	7	4	3rd	DNQ	(India) Abdul Ameen & Abdul Hashim	2
2022–23	5	1	0	4	7	13	3	5th	DNQ	(India) Muhammed Shareef	4
2023–24	5	2	2	1	7	6	8	3rd	DNQ	(India)	
2024–25	3	0	0	3	2	14	0	4th	DNQ	(India)	

=== Head coaches record ===
As of 13 January 2018

Name	Nationality	From	To	P	W	D	L	GF	GA	Win%
Deepak CM	India	January 2017	Present	6	3	0	3	11	11	50.00

== See also ==
- Santosh Trophy
