= Mizoram football team =

Mizoram
- Full name: Mizoram football team
- Founded: 1973; 52 years ago
- Ground: Rajiv Gandhi Stadium
- Capacity: 20,000
- Owner: Mizoram Football Association
- Manager: Andrew Lalremkima
- League: Santosh Trophy National Games
- 2024–25 2024–25: Group stage
Home colours	Away colours

The Mizoram football team is a football team representing Mizoram in Indian state football competitions. They were the champions of the Santosh Trophy in the 2013–14 season.

Mizoram Football Association is the governing body of Football in Mizoram and as such all matters related to the selection, training and participation of the Mizoram Football Team comes under them.

In the finals of 2013–14 season, played at Kanchenjunga Stadium, debutant Mizoram beat the Railways 3–0 to win the trophy, and the Rs 5 lakh prize.

== 2024-25 squad ==
The following playerswere called up to represent Mizoram in the 38th National Games, held ah Haldwani, Uttarakhand.

Note: Flags indicate national team as defined under FIFA eligibility rules; some limited exceptions apply. Players may hold more than one non-FIFA nationality.

No.	Pos.	Nation	Player
1	GK	IND	F. Lalmuanawma
22	GK	IND	R Malsawmkima
4	DF	IND	Lalhmunmawia
5	DF	IND	Stephen Lalrinfela
13	DF	IND	Lalramnunmawia
15	DF	IND	Lalbiakzuala
20	DF	IND	C Ramdinmawia
18	DF	IND	C zohmingsanga
6	MF	IND	Emmanuel Lalhruaizela
8	MF	IND	Kiran Chhetri
10	MF	IND	Peter Lalrinhlua

No.	Pos.	Nation	Player
23	MF	IND	R Malsawmtluanga
24	MF	IND	L Lalremmuana
28	MF	IND	Lalbiakthanga Hmar
29	MF	IND	Lalengmawia
7	FW	IND	Isaak Malsawmkima
11	FW	IND	HK Lalhruaitluanga
14	FW	IND	F Lallawmkima
16	FW	IND	Ricky Lallawmawma
17	FW	IND	Lalnunzira Sailo
27	FW	IND	C Ramnunpuia
49	FW	IND	William Lalnunfela

Team officials:

- Team manager: Andrew Lalremkima
- Head coach: B Malsawmzuala
- Coach:Lalrindika Hmar
- Coach: Anand Gurung
- Physio: Lalpekhlua Chenkual

== Honours ==
=== State (senior) ===
- Santosh Trophy
  - Winners (1): 2013–14
- National Games
  - Gold medal (1): 2015

=== State (youth) ===
- B.C. Roy Trophy
  - Winners (2): 2018–19, 2019–20
  - Runners-up (3): 1995–96, 2015–16, 2016–17
- Mir Iqbal Hussain Trophy
  - Winners (7): 2003–04, 2004–05, 2005–06, 2008–09, 2010, 2016–17, 2023–24
  - Runners-up (4): 1996, 2001–02, 2006–07, 2010–11

=== Others ===
- Bordoloi Trophy
  - Runners-up (1): 1994, 1997
