= Andhra Pradesh football team =

Football club in India

Andhra Pradesh
- Full name: Andhra Pradesh football team
- Founded: 1953; 73 years ago (as Andhra football team)
- Ground: Various
- Owner: Andhra Pradesh Football Association
- Head coach: Santhosh Kiran
- League: Santosh Trophy
- 2024–25: Group stage
Home colours	Away colours

The Andhra Pradesh football team is an Indian football team representing Andhra Pradesh in Indian state football competitions including the Santosh Trophy.

== History ==
The team has appeared in the Santosh Trophy finals twice, winning the trophy once. Prior to 1959, the team competed as Andhra football team. The Hyderabad Football Association merged with the Andhra Football Association to establish the combined team.

They have failed to qualify for the final rounds of 69th Santosh Trophy (2015).

== Current squad ==
Note: Flags indicate national team as defined under FIFA eligibility rules; some limited exceptions apply. Players may hold more than one non-FIFA nationality.

No.	Pos.	Nation	Player
3	DF	IND	Sirvisetti Krishna Chaitanya
4	DF	IND	Y Tharun Kumar Reddy
6	DF	IND	Jammula Vinay
7	MF	IND	Khaleel Shaik
8	MF	IND	Kandikatla Anil
9	MF	IND	Beemagouni Pavangoud
10	FW	IND	Chenna Ashok Chakravarthi
11	MF	IND	Sabbavarapu Ganesh Kumar
12	DF	IND	Manedi Venkata Naga Manikanta
13	DF	IND	Kuppili Nivaskumar

No.	Pos.	Nation	Player
26	GK	IND	Koppisetti Ajay Kumar
—		IND	Gurajala Narendra
—		IND	Inti Pavan
—		IND	Thottempudi Baburao
—	FW	IND	Kalaparthy Sravanth Kumar
—		IND	Nammi Murari
—		IND	Bommadi Nagaraju
—		IND	Boggu Surendra
—	DF	IND	Bathula Prem Teja
—	MF	IND	Gondiparla Arun Kumar

== Honours ==
=== State (senior) ===
- Santosh Trophy
  - Winners (1): 1965–66
  - Runners-up (1): 1963–64

=== State (youth) ===
- B.C. Roy Trophy
  - Winners (2): 1965–66, 1975–76
  - Runners-up (6): 1964–65, 1967–68, 1972–73, 1977–78, 1978–79, 1992–93
- Mir Iqbal Hussain Trophy
  - Runners-up (1): 1994–95

=== Others ===
- Sait Nagjee Football Tournament
  - Runners-up (4): 1962, 1967, 1976, 1977
