= Jharkhand football team =

Jharkhand
- Full name: Jharkhand football team
- Ground: Birsa Munda Football Stadium, Ranchi; Birsa Munda Athletics Stadium; JRD Tata Sports Complex, Jamshedpur
- Capacity: 40,000; 35,000; 24,424
- Owner: Jharkhand Football Association
- Head coach: Ranjit Kumar Halder
- League: Santosh Trophy
- 2024–25: Group stage
Home colours	Away colours

The Jharkhand football team (Hindi:झारखंड फुटबॉल टीम) is an Indian football team representing Jharkhand in Indian state football competitions including the Santosh Trophy. They failed to qualify for the most of Santosh Trophy final rounds.

== Honours ==
=== State (youth) ===
- B.C. Roy Trophy
  - Winners (4): 2004–05, 2005–06, 2006–07, 2008–09
- Mir Iqbal Hussain Trophy
  - Winners (2): 2009–10, 2010–11
