= Manipur football team =

Manipur
- Full name: Manipur football team
- Founded: 1973
- Ground: Khuman Lampak Main Stadium
- Capacity: 30,000
- Owner: All Manipur Football Association
- Head coach: Thangjam Saran Singh
- League: Santosh Trophy
- 2024–25: Semi-finals
Home colours	Away colours

The Manipur football team is an Indian football team representing Manipur in Indian state football competitions including the Santosh Trophy.

They have appeared in the Santosh Trophy finals twice, and have won the trophy once, in 2002–03. Legendary Indian footballer Talimeren Ao also captained the team in the 1950s.

== Squad ==
The following 22 players were called for the 2023–24 Santosh Trophy.

Note: Flags indicate national team as defined under FIFA eligibility rules; some limited exceptions apply. Players may hold more than one non-FIFA nationality.

No.	Pos.	Nation	Player
1	GK	IND	Thomas Shagolsem
2	DF	IND	Maibam Deny Singh
3	DF	IND	Md Rohit
4	DF	IND	Ningombam Kabiraj Singh
5	DF	IND	Rojen Meetei Wahengbam
6	MF	IND	Phijam Sanathoi Meetei
7	MF	IND	Nongmaithem Sushilkumar Singh
8	MF	IND	Ngangbam Pacha Singh
9	FW	IND	Ngathem Imarson Singh
10	FW	IND	Salam Samson Singh
11	FW	IND	Pebam Renedy Singh

No.	Pos.	Nation	Player
12	FW	IND	Wangkheimayum Sadananda Singh
13	DF	IND	Santa Yumlembam
14	DF	IND	Ayekpam Tomjoseph Singh
15	DF	IND	Soibam Abhinash Singh
16	DF	IND	Shunjanthan Ragui
17	FW	IND	Singam Subash Singh
18	MF	IND	Leimajam Sangkar Singh
19	MF	IND	Loyangamba Meitei Akoijam
20	GK	IND	Siddharth Rana
21	GK	IND	Ab Wiraibou
22	MF	IND	Laishram Bishal Singh

== Team officials ==
Team Manager:
Team Coach: Thangjam Saran Singh (2023-)

== Honours ==
=== State (senior) ===
- Santosh Trophy
  - Winners (1): 2002–03
  - Runners-up (1): 2010–11
- National Games
  - Silver medal (1): 2023

=== State (youth) ===
- B.C. Roy Trophy
  - Winners (3): 1998–99, 1999–2000, 2025–26
  - Runners-up (4): 1991–92, 2000–01, 2004–05, 2008–09
- Mir Iqbal Hussain Trophy
  - Winners (1): 1977
  - Runners-up (3): 1985, 2002–03, 2023–24
- M. Dutta Ray Trophy
  - Winners (1): 1994

=== Others ===
- Churachand Singh Trophy
  - Winners (1): 1954
  - Runners-up (2): 1950, 1952
- Kohima Royal Gold Cup
  - Winners (1): 1998
- Dr. T. Ao NorthEast Football Trophy
  - Runners-up (2): 2003, 2004
