= Sikkim football team =

Sikkim
- Full name: Sikkim football team
- Ground: Paljor Stadium
- Capacity: 30,000
- Head coach: Mahabir Nath
- League: Santosh Trophy
- 2024–25: Group stage
| Home colours | Away colours |

The Sikkim football team is an Indian football team represents Sikkim in Indian state football competitions including the Santosh Trophy.

They have appeared in the Santosh Trophy finals 4 times.

== History ==
The Sikkim football team represents Sikkim, a former protectorate and now state of India. When a protectorate, they were not affiliated with FIFA or the Asian Football Confederation, and therefore did not compete for the FIFA World Cup or Asian Cup.

They compete in the Santosh Trophy under the Sikkim Football Association.

== Squad ==
The following 22 players were called for the 2022–23 Santosh Trophy.

Note: Flags indicate national team as defined under FIFA eligibility rules; some limited exceptions apply. Players may hold more than one non-FIFA nationality.

| No. | Pos. | Nation | Player |
|---|---|---|---|
| 1 | GK | IND | Abhijeet Subba |
| 2 | DF | IND | Sangay Dundal Bhutia |
| 5 | DF | IND | Kunal Tamang |
| 12 | DF | IND | Afzal Ansari |
| 20 | DF | IND | Jasman Gurung |
| 7 | MF | IND | Boxer Pradhan |
| 15 | MF | IND | Prashant Chettri |
| 17 | MF | IND | Nima Lepcha |
| 10 | FW | IND | Sanjay Rai |
| 16 | FW | IND | Chandra Tamang |
| 19 | FW | IND | Ong Tshering Lepcha |

| No. | Pos. | Nation | Player |
|---|---|---|---|
| 3 | DF | IND | Prakash Rai |
| 4 | DF | IND | Sameer Pradhan |
| 6 | MF | IND | Bittu Rawat |
| — | | IND | Hishay Wangdi Bhutia |
| 9 | FW | IND | Amon Lepcha |
| 11 | FW | IND | Prakash Chettri |
| 14 | MF | IND | Taten Tshering Lepcha |
| — | | IND | Nima Rinchen Serpa |
| — | | IND | Nima Wongdi Tamang |
| — | | IND | Daenal Lepcha |
| — | | IND | John Tshering Lepcha |

== Honours ==
=== State (youth) ===
- B.C. Roy Trophy
  - Runners-up (1): 1998–99
