= Jammu and Kashmir football team =

Association football team representing Jammu and Kashmir in the Santosh Trophy

Jammu and Kashmir
- Full name: Jammu and Kashmir football team
- Owner: Jammu and Kashmir Football Association
- Head coach: Mehrajuddin Wadoo
- League: Santosh Trophy
- 2024–25: Quarter-finals
Home colours	Away colours

The Jammu and Kashmir football team is an Indian football team representing Jammu and Kashmir in Indian state football competitions including the Santosh Trophy.

The team took part in the 72nd Santosh Trophy held in Uttar Pradesh during January 2018. Akif Javed Reshi from Anantnag was the captain of the team.

Jammu and Kashmir has hosted the Santosh Trophy twice, in 1979 and 2007.

== Honours ==
=== State (youth) ===
- Mir Iqbal Hussain Trophy
  - Winners (1): 1987–88
