= Meghalaya football team =

Meghalaya
- Full name: Meghalaya football team
- Founded: 1976; 49 years ago
- Ground: Jawaharlal Nehru Stadium, Shillong
- Capacity: 30,000
- Owner: Meghalaya Football Association
- Head coach: Khlain Pyrkhat Syiemlieh
- League: Santosh Trophy
- 2024–25: Quarter-finals
Home colours	Away colours

The Meghalaya football team is an Indian football team representing Meghalaya in Indian state football competitions including the Santosh Trophy, which is the national football championship.

== Squad ==
The following 23 players were called for the 2022–23 Santosh Trophy.

Note: Flags indicate national team as defined under FIFA eligibility rules; some limited exceptions apply. Players may hold more than one non-FIFA nationality.

No.	Pos.	Nation	Player
1	GK	IND	Rajat Paul Lyngdoh
2	DF	IND	Banskhemlang Mawlong
3	DF	IND	Allen Camper Lyngdoh Nongbri
4	DF	IND	Henryford Nongneng
6	DF	IND	Ronney Willson Kharbudon
18	DF	IND	Wanboklang Lyngkhoi
8	MF	IND	Pynbhalang Suting
15	MF	IND	Nikelson Bina
16	MF	IND	Fullmoon Mukhim
7	FW	IND	Donlad Diengdoh
10	FW	IND	Manbhakupar Iawphniaw
11	FW	IND	Figo Syndai

No.	Pos.	Nation	Player
5	DF	IND	Apborlang Kurbah
—		IND	Ronney Willson Kharbudon
—		IND	Everbrightson Sana Mylliempdah
—		IND	Aibiang Mame Nongneng
—		IND	Samuel Shadap
—		IND	Damehun Syih
—		IND	Dajiedlang Wanshnong
19	FW	IND	Dawanchwa Carlos Challam
20	MF	IND	Damonlang Pathaw
—		IND	Banshanskhem Kharsyntiew
—		IND	Guidle Syiemlieh

== Honours ==
=== State (senior) ===
- Santosh Trophy
  - Runners-up (1): 2022–23
- National Games
  - Bronze medal (1): 2007

=== State (youth) ===
- B.C. Roy Trophy
  - Winners (1): 1988–89
- Mir Iqbal Hussain Trophy
  - Winners (3): 2012–13, 2017–18, 2019–20
  - Runners-up (2): 2004–05, 2016–17
