= Madhya Pradesh football team =

Madhya Pradesh
- Full name: Madhya Pradesh football team
- Owner: Madhya Pradesh Football Association
- Head coach: Chandan Balbir Rathod
- League: Santosh Trophy
- 2024–25: Group stage
Home colours	Away colours

The Madhya Pradesh football team, also earlier the Central Provinces football team, is an Indian football team representing Madhya Pradesh in Indian state football competitions including the Santosh Trophy.

They have failed to qualify for the most of final rounds.
