= Punjab football team (India) =

Punjab
- Full name: Punjab football team
- Ground: Various
- Owner: Punjab Football Association
- Head coach: Hardeep Singh
- League: Santosh Trophy
- 2024–25: Group stage
Home colours	Away colours	Third colours

The Punjab football team is an Indian football team representing Punjab in Indian state football competitions including the Santosh Trophy.

They have appeared in the Santosh Trophy finals 16 times and won the trophy 8 times.

== Honours ==
=== State (senior) ===
- Santosh Trophy
  - Winners (8): 1970–71, 1974–75, 1980–81, 1984–85, 1985–86, 1987–88, 2006–07, 2007–08
  - Runners-up (8): 1977–78, 1979–80, 1983–84, 1994–95, 2004–05, 2009–10, 2014–15, 2018–19
- National Games
  - Gold medal (3): 1985, 2001, 2002
  - Silver medal (3): 1997, 2011, 2015

=== State (youth) ===
- B.C. Roy Trophy
  - Winners (5): 1985–86, 1992–93, 2001–02, 2015–16, 2016–17
  - Runners-up (4): 1982–83, 1994–95, 2018–19, 2019–20
- Mir Iqbal Hussain Trophy
  - Runners-up (4): 1989–90, 1990–91, 1995–96, 2009–10
- M. Dutta Ray Trophy
  - Winners (2): 2003, 2008
  - Runners-up (2): 2005, 2006

=== Others ===
- Bordoloi Trophy
  - Runners-up (1): 1975

== Performance in AFC competitions ==
- Asian Club Championship: 1 appearance

1971: Group stage

=== Tournament record ===
All results list Punjab Police's goal tally first.

Season	Competition	Round	Club	Result	Position	Scorers	Source
1971	Asian Club Championship	Group B	(Thailand) Bangkok Bank	0–2	4th	Surjeet Singh (2 goals); Sukhwinder Singh (1 goal)	
1971	Asian Club Championship	Group B	(Israel) Maccabi Tel Aviv	1–4	4th	Surjeet Singh (2 goals); Sukhwinder Singh (1 goal)	
1971	Asian Club Championship	Group B	(Iraq) Aliyat Al-Shorta	1–6	4th	Surjeet Singh (2 goals); Sukhwinder Singh (1 goal)	

== Footnotes ==
1. In preliminary round (group allocation matches), Punjab played against 1969–70 Kuwaiti Premier League champions Al-Arabi on 22 March 1971, lost 1–8, and was included in Group B.
