= Delhi football team =

Delhi
- Full name: Delhi football team
- Founded: 1941; 84 years ago
- Ground: Jawaharlal Nehru Stadium
- Capacity: 60,254
- Owner: Delhi Soccer Association
- Head coach: Mohammad Sabir
- League: Santosh Trophy
- 2024–25: Quarter-finals
Home colours	Away colours

The Delhi football team is an Indian football team representing Delhi in Indian state football competitions including the Santosh Trophy. Selection is mostly done through Delhi Football League system.

They have appeared in the Santosh Trophy finals twice, and have won the trophy only once, in 1944-45.

Most recently, a 20-member Delhi football team in the final round of the 69th Senior National Football Championship for Santosh Trophy, that held at Jalandhar and Ludhiana from 1 to 15 March.

== Honours ==
=== State (senior) ===
- Santosh Trophy
  - Winners (1): 1944–45
  - Runners-up (1): 1941–42
- National Games
  - Bronze medal (1): 2025

=== State (youth) ===
- Swami Vivekananda NFC
  - Winners (1): 2023–24
- B.C. Roy Trophy
  - Winners (2): 1962–63, 1964–65
