= Assam football team =

Assam
- Full name: Assam football team
- Founded: 1946
- Ground: Nehru Stadium
- Capacity: 15,000
- Owner: Assam Football Association
- Head coach: Subam Rabha
- League: Santosh Trophy
- 2024–25: Group stage
Home colours	Away colours

The Assam football team (Assamese: অসম ফুটবল দল) is an Indian football team representing Assam in Indian state football competitions including the Santosh Trophy.

== Current squad ==
As of 19 November 2024:

Note: Flags indicate national team as defined under FIFA eligibility rules; some limited exceptions apply. Players may hold more than one non-FIFA nationality.

No.	Pos.	Nation	Player
1	GK	IND	Abhinash Mech
2	GK	IND	Gojen Hanse
3	DF	IND	Nayanjyoti Kuli
4	DF	IND	Abu Usman Ali
5	DF	IND	Bishnu Rabha
6	DF	IND	Tupu Brahma
7	DF	IND	Sudem Wary
8	DF	IND	Bibung Narzary
9	DF	IND	Kapil Boro
39	DF	IND	Bilson Daimary
11	MF	IND	Rahul Das
12	MF	IND	Sudeepta Konwar

No.	Pos.	Nation	Player
13	FW	IND	Sandeep Thapa
14	MF	IND	Sangson Saikia
15	MF	IND	Subham Chetry
16	FW	IND	Bivan Jyoti Laskar
17	FW	IND	Jerry Pulamte
18	FW	IND	Aman Chetri
19	FW	IND	Baoringdao Bodo
20	FW	IND	Akrang Narzary
21	FW	IND	Dipu Mirdha
22	FW	IND	Joydeep Gogoi

== Current coaching staff ==
Position	Name
Head coach	(India) Subam Rabha
Assistant coach	(India) Daimalu Basumatary
Goalkeeping coach	(India) Lochan Saikia
Physiotherapist	(India) Dr. Abhishek Bora
Manager	(India) Jwngsar Brahma

== Honours ==
=== State (senior) ===
- National Games
  - Gold medal (1): 2007
  - Silver medal (1): 1999

=== State (youth) ===
- B.C. Roy Trophy
  - Runners-up (4): 1963–64, 1969–70, 1984–85, 1996–97
- Mir Iqbal Hussain Trophy
  - Winners (4): 1980, 1981, 1981–82, 2011–12
  - Runners-up (1): 1983–84
- M. Dutta Ray Trophy
  - Runners-up (1): 1994

=== Others ===
- Dr. T. Ao NorthEast Football Trophy
  - Winners (2): 2003, 2004
