= Railways football team =

Railways
- Full name: Railways football team
- Ground: Karnail Singh Stadium
- Capacity: 5,000
- Owner(s): Railways Sports Promotion Board; Indian Railways
- Head coach: Parthasarathy Tulasi
- League: Santosh Trophy
Home colours	Away colours

The Railways football team is the football section of the Indian Railways in Indian domestic football competitions, most notably the Santosh Trophy.

They have appeared in the Santosh Trophy finals nine times, and have won the trophy thrice.

== Honours ==
=== State (senior) ===
- Santosh Trophy
  - Winners (3): 1961–62, 1964–65, 1966–67
  - Runners-up (6): 1971–72, 1973–74, 1980–81, 1981–82, 1986–87, 2013–14

=== State (youth) ===
- M. Dutta Ray Trophy
  - Winners (2): 1997, 1998

== See also ==
- List of football clubs in India
- Railways women's football team
- Army Red
- Army Green
- Indian Air Force
- Indian Navy
- Services football team
- Assam Rifles
- Central Reserve Police Force SC
- Eastern Railway FC
- CISF Protectors football team
