= 2022–23 Santosh Trophy group stage =

The 2022–23 Santosh Trophy group stage was contested by a total of 36 teams from 23 December 2022 to 31 January 2023, to decide the remaining 9 places in the Final round of the tournament.

== Schedule ==
Matchday	Dates					
Matchday	Group I	Group II	Group III	Group IV	Group V	Group VI
Matchday 1	23 December 2022	26, 27 December 2022	28 December 2022	7 January 2023	24 December 2022	22 January 2023
Matchday 2	25 December 2022	29, 30 December 2022	30 December 2022	9 January 2023	26 December 2022	24 January 2023
Matchday 3	27 December 2022	1, 2 January 2023	1 January 2023	11 January 2023	28 December 2022	27 January 2023
Matchday 4	29 December 2022	4, 5 January 2023	3 January 2023	13 January 2023	30 December 2022	29 January 2023
Matchday 5	31 December 2022	7, 8 January 2023	5 January 2023	15 January 2023	1 January 2023	31 January 2023

=== Centralised venues ===
On 25 November 2022, the AIFF announced the venues for Groups I, II and V. The venue for Group III and IV was confirmed on 28 and 29 November respectively. The final group venue was confirmed on 7 December.

- Group I → New Delhi, Delhi (Jawaharlal Nehru Stadium, Ambedkar Stadium)
- Group II → Kozhikode, Kerala (EMS Stadium)
- Group III → Kokrajhar, Assam (SAI Special Area Games Centre, KDSA Playground)
- Group IV → Kohlapur, Maharashtra (Chhatrapati Shahu Stadium)
- Group V → Bhubaneswar, Odisha (Capital Football Arena, OSAP 7th Battalion Ground)
- Group VI → Imphal, Manipur (Khuman Lampak Main Stadium, Eastern Sporting Union Ground)

== Group I ==
Pos	Team	Pld	W	D	L	GF	GA	GD	Pts	Qualification	DL	KA	GJ	UT	TR	LA
1	Delhi (H)	5	4	1	0	14	1	+13	13	Final round	—	—	4–0	2–1	—	—
2	Karnataka	5	4	0	1	21	5	+16	12	Final round	0–1	—	—	—	10–0	—
3	Gujarat	5	3	0	2	12	10	+2	9		—	1–5	—	3–1	—	—
4	Uttarakhand	5	1	1	3	6	10	−4	4		—	1–3	—	—	1–0	—
5	Tripura	5	1	1	3	2	18	−16	4		0–0	—	0–6	—	—	—
6	Ladakh	5	0	1	4	5	16	−11	1		0–7	2–3	0–2	2–2	1–2	—

Source: AIFF
Rules for classification: 1) points; 2) head-to-head points; 3) head-to-head goal difference; 4) goal difference; 5) number of goals scored; 6) drawing of lots
(H) Hosts
23 December 2022
11:00

Ladakh	2–2	Uttarakhand
Chinba Tharchin 4', 9'	Report	Sucharu Dabral 18', 19'

Jawaharlal Nehru Stadium, New Delhi

23 December 2022
12:30

Tripura	0–0	Delhi
	Report

Ambedkar Stadium, New Delhi

23 December 2022
14:30

Gujarat	1–5	Karnataka
Moinuddin 67'	Report	Ankith P 26'; Bekey Oram 78'; Abhishekh Shankar Powar 83', 90'; M Sunil Kumar 88'

Jawaharlal Nehru Stadium, New Delhi

25 December 2022
11:00

Uttarakhand	1–3	Karnataka
Ajay Bisht 44'	Report	Jacob John Kattookaren 21'; Shajan Franklin 45+3'; Ankith P 90+3'

Jawaharlal Nehru Stadium, New Delhi

25 December 2022
12:30

Ladakh	0–7	Delhi
	Report	Raviraj Singh 18'; Ajay Singh 35', 90+4'; Gaurav Chadha 40'; Jaideep Singh 47', 88', 90+1'

Ambedkar Stadium, New Delhi

25 December 2022
14:30

Tripura	0–6	Gujarat
	Report	Moinuddin 11'; Jay Kanani 20', 67', 90+2', 90+5'; Parmar Dharmesh 79'

Jawaharlal Nehru Stadium, New Delhi

27 December 2022
11:00

Ladakh	2–3	Karnataka
Mohmad Ilyas 9'; Stanzin Gilik 90+3'	Report	Abhishekh Shankar Powar 27'; Jacob John Kattookaren 54'; Robin Yadav 80'

Jawaharlal Nehru Stadium, New Delhi

27 December 2022
12:30

Delhi	4–0	Gujarat
Ajay Singh 30'; Mahip Adhikari 59', 81', 84'	Report

Ambedkar Stadium, New Delhi

27 December 2022
14:30

Uttarakhand	1–0	Tripura
Sarthak Singh 56'	Report

Jawaharlal Nehru Stadium, New Delhi

29 December 2022
11:00

Karnataka	10–0	Tripura
Shelton Paul M 2', 27'; Robin Yadav 16'; Prashanth Kalinga 30'; M Sunil Kumar 40'; Abhishekh Shankar Powar 54'; Appu 78'; Ankith P 81'; Rajaganapathy K 86'; Kamalesh P 90+6'	Report

Jawaharlal Nehru Stadium, New Delhi

29 December 2022
12:30

Delhi	2–1	Uttarakhand
Mahip Adhikari 16'; Jaideep Singh 45+2'	Report	Sucharu Dabral 68'

Ambedkar Stadium, New Delhi

29 December 2022
14:30

Ladakh	0–2	Gujarat
	Report	Jay Kanani 28'; Rutig Ahirrao 50'

Jawaharlal Nehru Stadium, New Delhi

31 December 2022
11:00

Ladakh	1–2	Tripura
Chinba Tharchin 87'	Report	Joykishan Ghashi 87'; Subhanil Ghosh 90+3'

Jawaharlal Nehru Stadium, New Delhi

31 December 2022
12:30

Karnataka	0–1	Delhi
	Report	Gaurav Rawat 77'

Ambedkar Stadium, New Delhi

31 December 2022
14:30

Gujarat	3–1	Uttarakhand
Parmar Dharmesh 34'; Moinuddin 79', 85'	Report	Anuj Rawat 70'

Jawaharlal Nehru Stadium, New Delhi

== Group II ==
Pos	Team	Pld	W	D	L	GF	GA	GD	Pts	Qualification	KL	MZ	JK	BR	RJ	AP
1	Kerala (H)	5	5	0	0	24	2	+22	15	Final round	—	—	3–0	—	—	5–0
2	Mizoram	5	4	0	1	14	8	+6	12		1–5	—	—	—	4–0	—
3	Jammu and Kashmir	5	2	1	2	8	8	0	7		—	2–3	—	—	0–0	—
4	Bihar	5	1	1	3	6	10	−4	4		1–4	1–3	0–2	—	3–0	1–1
5	Rajasthan	5	1	1	3	1	14	−13	4		0–7	—	—	—	—	1–0
6	Andhra Pradesh	5	0	1	4	3	14	−11	1		—	0–3	2–4	—	—	—

Source: AIFF
Rules for classification: 1) points; 2) head-to-head points; 3) head-to-head goal difference; 4) goal difference; 5) number of goals scored; 6) drawing of lots
(H) Hosts
26 December 2022
08:00

Bihar	0–2	Jammu and Kashmir
	Report	Faisal Maqsood Thakur 38'; Aakif Javaid 58'

EMS Stadium, Kozhikode

26 December 2022
15:30

Rajasthan	0–7	Kerala
	Report	Nijo Gilbert 6'; Viknesh M 12', 20'; Naresh Bhagyanathan 23', 36'; Riswanali Edakkavil 55', 81'

EMS Stadium, Kozhikode

27 December 2022
15:30

Andhra Pradesh	0–3	Mizoram
	Report	Malsawmfela 26'; Joseph Lalvenhima 82', 90'

EMS Stadium, Kozhikode

29 December 2022
08:00

Jammu and Kashmir	2–3	Mizoram
Adnan Ayub 10'; Aakif Javaid 58'	Report	Lalbiakhlua 33'; Lalthanlhuma 83'; Lalnunzira Sailo 87'

EMS Stadium, Kozhikode

29 December 2022
15:30

Bihar	1–4	Kerala
Munna Mandi 70'	Report	Nijo Gilbert 24', 28'; Vishak Mohanan 81'; Abdu Raheem K. 85'

EMS Stadium, Kozhikode

30 December 2022
15:30

Rajasthan	1–0	Andhra Pradesh
Youraj Singh 70'	Report

EMS Stadium, Kozhikode

1 January 2023
08:00

Bihar	1–3	Mizoram
Munna Mandi 33'	Report	Vanlalhriatzuala K 2'; Lalbiakdika 59', 90+4'

EMS Stadium, Kozhikode

1 January 2023
15:30

Kerala	5–0	Andhra Pradesh
Nijo Gilbert 16'; Mohamed Salim 19'; Abdu Raheem K 45+4'; Vishak Mohanan 53'; Viknesh M 62'	Report

EMS Stadium, Kozhikode

2 January 2023
15:30

Jammu and Kashmir	0–0	Rajasthan
	Report

EMS Stadium, Kozhikode
Referee: Arvind Sekhar A.

4 January 2023
15:30

Mizoram	4–0	Rajasthan
Lalrinzuala 60'; Lalbiakdika 77', 90+4'; Joseph Lalvenhima 86'	Report	Ranu Singh Rajawat (red card) 90+4'

EMS Stadium, Kozhikode
Referee: Vinay S.

4 January 2023
08:00

Bihar	1–1	Andhra Pradesh
Arif Siddiki 33'	Report	Narendra Madiwal 26'

EMS Stadium, Kozhikode
Referee: R Kannan

5 January 2023
15:30

Kerala	3–0	Jammu and Kashmir
Viknesh M 51'; Riswanali Edakkavil 76'; Nijo Gilbert 90+3'	Report

EMS Stadium, Kozhikode
Referee: Deepraj Damodar Sangelkar

7 January 2023
08:00

Bihar	3–0	Rajasthan
Akash Kumar 45'; Munna Mandi 45+3'; Ankit Kumar 90+3'	Report

EMS Stadium, Kozhikode

7 January 2023
15:30

Andhra Pradesh	2–4	Jammu and Kashmir
Arun Kumar Arogyanathan 80'; Thuppakula Pradeep 90+4'	Report	Ateeb Ahmed Dar 14'; Aakif Javaid 62', 69', 71'

EMS Stadium, Kozhikode
Referee: Sathish R

8 January 2023
15:30

Mizoram	1–5	Kerala
Malsawmfela 80'	Report	Naresh Bhagyanathan 30', 65'; Nijo Gilbert 47'; Gifty C. Gracious 77'; Vishak Mohanan 85'

EMS Stadium, Kozhikode
Referee: Mohammed Junaid Saijad Tanji

== Group III ==
Pos	Team	Pld	W	D	L	GF	GA	GD	Pts	Qualification	GA	NL	AS	UP	AR	TN
1	Goa	5	3	2	0	8	3	+5	11	Final round	—	0–0	—	—	2–1	—
2	Nagaland	5	3	2	0	6	2	+4	11		—	—	3–1	—	—	1–0
3	Assam (H)	5	3	0	2	12	6	+6	9		0–1	—	—	—	4–1	—
4	Uttar Pradesh	5	2	1	2	6	6	0	7		2–2	0–1	0–2	—	2–0	2–1
5	Arunachal Pradesh	5	1	1	3	5	10	−5	4		—	1–1	—	—	—	2–1
6	Tamil Nadu	5	0	0	5	3	13	−10	0		0–3	—	1–5	—	—	—

Source: AIFF
Rules for classification: 1) points; 2) head-to-head points; 3) head-to-head goal difference; 4) goal difference; 5) number of goals scored; 6) drawing of lots
(H) Hosts
28 December 2022
14:00

Arunachal Pradesh	2–1	Tamil Nadu
Gemar Loya 9'; Tapi Hakhe 50'	Report	Sudhakar Tamilselvan 18'

SAI Special Area Games Centre, Kokrajhar

28 December 2022
14:00

Uttar Pradesh	0–1	Nagaland
	Report	Kevisanyu Peseyie 72'

KDSA Playground, Kokrajhar

28 December 2022
18:00

Assam	0–1	Goa
	Report	Stendly Fernandes 49'

SAI Special Area Games Centre, Kokrajhar

30 December 2022
14:00

Nagaland	1–0	Tamil Nadu
Haileuyibe Iranggau 6'	Report

SAI Special Area Games Centre, Kokrajhar

30 December 2022
14:00

Uttar Pradesh	2–2	Goa
Sanjog Yadav 18'; Yashraj Thapa 39'	Report	Trijoy Savio Dias 49'; Jovel Martins 54'

KDSA Playground, Kokrajhar

30 December 2022
18:00

Assam	4–1	Arunachal Pradesh
Milan Basumatary 21'; Jwngbla Brahma 39', 66'; Jigyas Deka 90+4'	Report	Hage Gendha 48'

SAI Special Area Games Centre, Kokrajhar
Referee: Shubhankar Khamri

1 January 2023
14:00

Goa	2–1	Arunachal Pradesh
Mahammed Faheez 19'; Trijoy Savio Dias 28'	Report	Taba Heli 47'

SAI Special Area Games Centre, Kokrajhar

1 January 2023
18:00

Nagaland	3–1	Assam
Haileuyibe Iranggau 25', 45+3'; Pursunep 48'	Report	Jigyas Deka 75'

SAI Special Area Games Centre, Kokrajhar

1 January 2023
14:00

Uttar Pradesh	2–1	Tamil Nadu
Yashraj Thapa 24'; Sanjog Yadav 39'	Report	Sarath Raj 62'

KDSA Playground, Kokrajhar

3 January 2023
14:00

Uttar Pradesh	2–0	Arunachal Pradesh
Yashraj Thapa 80'; Radharaman Yadav 84'; Adityaraj Singh (yellow card) 70' (yellow-red card) 90+2'	Report

KDSA Playground, Kokrajhar

3 January 2023
14:00

Tamil Nadu	1–5	Assam
Shem Marton Eugene 14'	Report	Jwngbla Brahma 11', 42'; Akrang Narzary 69', 71'; Jigyas Deka 87'

SAI Special Area Games Centre, Kokrajhar

3 January 2023
18:00

Goa	0–0	Nagaland
	Report

SAI Special Area Games Centre, Kokrajhar
Referee: Nripen Halder

5 January 2023
14:00

Arunachal Pradesh	1–1	Nagaland
Taba Heli 77'	Report	Hoatinmang Thomsong 70'

KDSA Playground, Kokrajhar

5 January 2023
14:00

Uttar Pradesh	0–2	Assam
	Report	Arjun Mardi 45+2', 52'

SAI Special Area Games Centre, Kokrajhar

5 January 2023
18:00

Tamil Nadu	0–3	Goa
	Report	Trijoy Savio Dias 12'; Mahammed Faheez 47', 68'

SAI Special Area Games Centre, Kokrajhar

== Group IV ==
Pos	Team	Pld	W	D	L	GF	GA	GD	Pts	Qualification	WB	MH	HR	CT	MP	DH
1	West Bengal	5	5	0	0	17	1	+16	15	Final round	—	—	—	2–0	5–0	—
2	Maharashtra (H)	5	4	0	1	13	3	+10	12	Final round	1–2	—	3–1	—	—	—
3	Haryana	5	3	0	2	9	8	+1	9		0–3	—	—	—	2–1	—
4	Chhattisgarh	5	1	1	3	5	7	−2	4		—	0–1	1–2	—	—	—
5	Madhya Pradesh	5	1	1	3	5	13	−8	4		—	0–4	—	2–2	—	—
6	Dadra and Nagar Haveli and Daman and Diu	5	0	0	5	0	17	−17	0		0–5	0–4	0–4	0–2	0–2	—

Source: AIFF
Rules for classification: 1) points; 2) head-to-head points; 3) head-to-head goal difference; 4) goal difference; 5) number of goals scored; 6) drawing of lots
(H) Hosts
7 January 2023
08:00

Dadra and Nagar Haveli and Daman and Diu	0–2	Chhattisgarh
	Report	Ujit Singh Markam 35'; Avishek Kunjam 39'

Chhatrapati Shahu Stadium, Kohlapur
Referee: Jestin Jose Kuzhivelil

7 January 2023
11:00

Haryana	0–3	West Bengal
	Report	Totan Das 3'; Surajit Hansda 22'; Robi Hansda 53'

Chhatrapati Shahu Stadium, Kohlapur
Referee: Ajay Krishnan

7 January 2023
15:30

Madhya Pradesh	0–4	Maharashtra
	Report	Arif Shaikh 23', 66'; Sufiyan Shaikh 47'; Ashutosh Malviya 88' (o.g.)

Chhatrapati Shahu Stadium, Kohlapur

9 January 2023
08:00

Haryana	2–1	Madhya Pradesh
Jeevesh 19'; Hitesh Kadian 22'	Report	Deependra Sisodiya 52'

Chhatrapati Shahu Stadium, Kohlapur
Referee: Moosa Vayoli

9 January 2023
11:30

Chhattisgarh	0–1	Maharashtra
	Report	Arif Shaikh 86'

Chhatrapati Shahu Stadium, Kohlapur
Referee: Bagavath Sundhar Jee S.

9 January 2023
15:30

Dadra and Nagar Haveli and Daman and Diu	0–5	West Bengal
	Report	Robi Hansda 3', 54'; Naro Hari Shrestha 45+4', 63'; Souvik Kar 82'

Chhatrapati Shahu Stadium, Kohlapur
Referee: Sumiraj Poorathil

11 January 2023
08:30

West Bengal	5–0	Madhya Pradesh
Robi Hansda 14', 63'; Naro Hari Shrestha 22', 45+1'; Totan Das 55'	Report

Chhatrapati Shahu Stadium, Kohlapur
Referee: Jestin Jose Kuzhivelil

11 January 2023
11:30

Dadra and Nagar Haveli and Daman and Diu	0–4	Maharashtra
	Report	Omkar Suresh Patil 8', 9'; Haustubh Rabindra 35'; Rushikesh Ganesh 78'

Chhatrapati Shahu Stadium, Kohlapur
Referee: Ajay Krishnan

11 January 2023
15:30

Chhattisgarh	1–2	Haryana
Abhay Kumar Yadav 84'	Report	Hitesh Kadian 82'; Pradeep Kumar 84'

Chhatrapati Shahu Stadium, Kohlapur

13 January 2023
08:30

Maharashtra	3–1	Haryana
Arif Shaikh 2', 30'; Johnson Joseph Mathews 9'	Report	Hitesh Kadian 45+1'

Chhatrapati Shahu Stadium, Kohlapur
Referee: Bagavath Sundhar

13 January 2023
11:30

Dadra and Nagar Haveli and Daman and Diu	0–2	Madhya Pradesh
	Report	Rishabh Kumar Rajak 30'; Ishaan Sahi 72'

Chhatrapati Shahu Stadium, Kohlapur
Referee: Sumiraj Poorathil

13 January 2023
15:30

West Bengal	2–0	Chhattisgarh
Naro Hari Shrestha 58', 68'	Report

Chhatrapati Shahu Stadium, Kohlapur
Referee: Moosa Vayoli

15 January 2023
08:30

Dadra and Nagar Haveli and Daman and Diu	0–4	Haryana
	Report	Hitesh Kadian 45+2', 77'; Ajay 48'; Jeevesh 55'

Chhatrapati Shahu Stadium, Kohlapur
Referee: Ashirbad Kanungo

15 January 2023
11:30

Madhya Pradesh	2–2	Chhattisgarh
Ishaan Sahi 23', 82'	Report	Ujit Singh Markam 42', 60'

Chhatrapati Shahu Stadium, Kohlapur
Referee: Ajay Krishnan

15 January 2023
15:30

Maharashtra	1–2	West Bengal
Arif Shaikh 78'	Report	Surajit Hansda 8'; Dipak Kumar 39'

Chhatrapati Shahu Stadium, Kohlapur
Referee: Moosa Vayoli

== Group V ==
Pos	Team	Pld	W	D	L	GF	GA	GD	Pts	Qualification	ML	OD	SK	TG	PY	AN
1	Meghalaya	5	3	2	0	17	2	+15	11	Final round	—	2–2	0–0	1–0	—	—
2	Odisha (H)	5	3	1	1	17	3	+14	10	Final round	—	—	3–0	—	5–0	7–0
3	Sikkim	5	3	1	1	8	5	+3	10		—	—	—	3–0	2–1	—
4	Telangana	5	3	0	2	11	5	+6	9		—	1–0	—	—	5–1	—
5	Pondicherry	5	0	1	4	3	18	−15	1		0–5	—	—	—	—	1–1
6	Andaman and Nicobar	5	0	1	4	2	25	−23	1		0–9	—	1–3	0–5	—	—

Source: AIFF
Rules for classification: 1) points; 2) head-to-head points; 3) head-to-head goal difference; 4) goal difference; 5) number of goals scored; 6) drawing of lots
(H) Hosts
24 December 2022
14:30

Odisha	7–0	Andaman and Nicobar
Sanjit Khora 5', 18'; Adwin Tirkey 6'; Bikash Kumar Sahoo 13'; Chandra Muduli 61'; Chandra Mohan Murmu 86'; Rahul Mukhi 90+1'	Report

Capital Football Arena, Bhubaneswar

24 December 2022
14:30

Meghalaya	0–0	Sikkim
	Report

OSAP 7th Battalion Ground, Bhubaneswar

24 December 2022
10:00

Telangana	5–1	Pondicherry
Rasiq Ahmed Khan 2', 4', 17', 28'; Syed Yousuf 79'	Report	Asalam Amanulla 58'

Capital Football Arena, Bhubaneswar

26 December 2022
10:00

Andaman and Nicobar	1–3	Sikkim
Githin Raj 44'	Report	Nima Lepcha 4'; Prakash Chettri 32', 87'

OSAP 7th Battalion Ground, Bhubaneswar

26 December 2022
14:30

Odisha	5–0	Pondicherry
Dinabandhu Das 28'; Prabin Tigga 52', 68'; Rajesh Kanna G 75' (o.g.); Rahul Mukhi 85'	Report

Capital Football Arena, Bhubaneswar

26 December 2022
10:00

Meghalaya	1–0	Telangana
Figo Syndai 14'	Report

Capital Football Arena, Bhubaneswar

28 December 2022
14:30

Sikkim	2–1	Pondicherry
Ong Lepcha 20', 33'	Report	Srinath 66'

Capital Football Arena, Bhubaneswar

28 December 2022
10:00

Telangana	1–0	Odisha
Solaimalai N 29'	Report

Capital Football Arena, Bhubaneswar

28 December 2022
10:00

Andaman and Nicobar	0–9	Meghalaya
Farhan Ahmed (red card) 80'	Report	Nikelson Bina 3'; Figo Syndai 27', 32'; Damonlang Pathaw 63'; Everbrightson Sana Mylliempdah 70', 75', 80'; Dajiedlang Wanshnong 87'; Damehun Syih 90+2'

OSAP 7th Battalion Ground, Bhubaneswar

30 December 2022
10:00

Pondicherry	0–5	Meghalaya
	Report	Donlad Diengdoh 12', 45'; Manbhakupar Iawphniaw 83', 87', 90+1'

OSAP 7th Battalion Ground, Bhubaneswar

30 December 2022
14:30

Andaman and Nicobar	0–5	Telangana
	Report	Syed Yousuf 29', 31'; Solaimalai N 39'; Shafique Mohammad 47'; Rasiq Ahmed Khan 67'

Capital Football Arena, Bhubaneswar

30 December 2022
10:00

Odisha	3–0	Sikkim
Sanjit Khora 4'; Pintu Samal 23'; Chandra Muduli 39'	Report

Capital Football Arena, Bhubaneswar

1 January 2023
14:30

Meghalaya	2–2	Odisha
Allen Camper Lyngdoh Nongbri 45+1'; Everbrightson Sana Mylliempdah 90+2'	Report	Prabin Tigga 45+3'; Chandra Muduli 59'

Capital Football Arena, Bhubaneswar

1 January 2023
14:30

Sikkim	3–0	Telangana
Prakash Chettri 58'; Nima Lepcha 60'; Sanjay Rai 64'	Report	Shafique Mohammad (red card) 67'

OSAP 7th Battalion Ground, Bhubaneswar

1 January 2023
10:00

Pondicherry	1–1	Andaman and Nicobar
Austin Jijo 83'	Report	Anshif M 65'

Capital Football Arena, Bhubaneswar

== Group VI ==
Pos	Team	Pld	W	D	L	GF	GA	GD	Pts	Qualification	PB	MN	CH	JH	LD	HP
1	Punjab	5	4	1	0	11	1	+10	13	Final round	—	—	1–1	—	—	5–0
2	Manipur (H)	5	4	0	1	16	6	+10	12	Final round	0–1	—	—	5–1	—	—
3	Chandigarh	5	2	1	2	10	6	+4	7		—	1–3	—	—	—	5–0
4	Jharkhand	5	2	0	3	6	11	−5	6		0–1	—	1–0	—	—	—
5	Lakshadweep	5	1	0	4	7	13	−6	3		0–3	1–3	1–3	4–2	—	1–2
6	Himachal Pradesh	5	1	0	4	5	18	−13	3		—	2–5	—	2–1	—	—

Source: AIFF
Rules for classification: 1) points; 2) head-to-head points; 3) head-to-head goal difference; 4) goal difference; 5) number of goals scored; 6) drawing of lots
(H) Hosts
22 January 2023
10:00

Chandigarh	1–3	Manipur
Kunal Singh 49'	Report	Pangambam Naoba Meitei 4'; Singam Subash Singh 18'; Ronald Singh Shaikhom 90+5'

Khuman Lampak Main Stadium, Imphal

22 January 2023
14:00

Jharkhand	0–1	Punjab
	Report	Bhupinder Singh 66'

Khuman Lampak Main Stadium, Imphal

22 January 2023
14:00

Lakshadweep	1–2	Himachal Pradesh
Mohammed Shareef P 39'	Report	Abhishekh Chaudhary 45+2'; Dheeraj Datta 65'

ESU Ground, Imphal

24 January 2023
10:00

Lakshadweep	0–3	Punjab
	Report	Amarpreet Singh 15'; Parmjit Singh 80'; Bipul Kala 90+2'

Khuman Lampak Main Stadium, Imphal

24 January 2023
14:00

Himachal Pradesh	2–5	Manipur
Sourabh Kumar 57'; Hemant Thakur 85'	Report	Moirangthem Malemnganba 5', 61'; Yami Longvah 37'; Kishan Singh Thongam 41'; Ronald Singh Shaikhom 74'

Khuman Lampak Main Stadium, Imphal

24 January 2023
14:00

Jharkhand	1–0	Chandigarh
Birsha Tudu 67'	Report

ESU Ground, Imphal

27 January 2023
10:00

Lakshadweep	1–3	Manipur
Mohammed Shareef P 60'	Report	Maibam Deny Singh 3'; Ngangbam Naocha Singh 34'; Seigoumang Doungel 82'

Khuman Lampak Main Stadium, Imphal

27 January 2023
14:00

Himachal Pradesh	1–2	Jharkhand
Hemant Thakur 85'	Report	Birsha Tudu 6'; Vimal Kumhar 60'

ESU Ground, Imphal

27 January 2023
14:00

Punjab	1–1	Chandigarh
Jatin Yadav 52' (o.g.)	Report	Nepolean Morangthem 55'; Harjinder Singh (yellow card) 73' (yellow-red card) 88'

Khuman Lampak Main Stadium, Imphal

29 January 2023
10:00

Lakshadweep	1–3	Chandigarh
Mohammed Shareef P 29'; Mohammed Niyas PM (red card) 45+3'	Report	Laishram Johnson Singh (red card) 45+3'; Naorem Gobindash Singh 63'; Swamya Hardik Singh 65'; Kunal Singh 69'

Khuman Lampak Main Stadium, Imphal

29 January 2023
14:00

Punjab	5–0	Himachal Pradesh
Rohit Sheikh 2'; Abhishek Rattu 28', 74'; Parmjit Singh 34'; Amarpreet Singh 86'	Report

ESU Ground, Imphal

29 January 2023
14:00

Manipur	5–1	Jharkhand
Kishan Singh Thongam 3'; Carrick Mangminlun 5'; Ronald Singh Shaikhom 7'; Singam Subash Singh 77'; Pangambam Naoba Meitei 87'	Report	Rohit Tigga 89'

Khuman Lampak Main Stadium, Imphal

31 January 2023
14:00

Lakshadweep	4–2	Jharkhand
Mohammed Thafruque 10'; Nasarulla 12'; Mohammed Shareef P 32'; Mohammed Riyazudeen P (red card) 66'; Naseeb Ac 78'	Report	Bikram Sankho Kisku 51'; Rohan Kachhap 68'

ESU Ground, Imphal

31 January 2023
14:00

Chandigarh	5–0	Himachal Pradesh
Kartik Choudhary 13'; Gaurav Negi 15'; Gurtegbir Singh 47', 54'; Naorem Gobindash Singh 61'	Report

Khuman Lampak Main Stadium, Imphal

31 January 2023
14:00

Manipur	0–1	Punjab
	Report	Parmjit Singh 12'

Khuman Lampak Main Stadium, Imphal

== Ranking of second-placed teams ==
Pos	Grp	Team	Pld	W	D	L	GF	GA	GD	Pts	Qualification
1	I	Karnataka	5	4	0	1	21	5	+16	12	Final round
2	VI	Manipur	5	4	0	1	16	6	+10	12	Final round
3	IV	Maharashtra	5	4	0	1	13	3	+10	12	Final round
4	II	Mizoram	5	4	0	1	14	8	+6	12	
5	III	Nagaland	5	3	2	0	6	2	+4	11	
6	V	Odisha (Note: Odisha directly qualified for the Final round after being declared as the host of the round.)	5	3	1	1	17	3	+14	10	Final round

Source: AIFF

== Statistics ==
=== Top scorers ===
As of 14 January 2023

Rank	Player	State	Goals
1	Naro Hari Shrestha	West Bengal	6
1	Arif Shaikh	Maharashtra	6
1	Nijo Gilbert	Kerala	6
2	Rasiq Ahmed Khan	Telangana	5
2	Robi Hansda	West Bengal	5
2	Jay Kanani	Gujarat	5
3	Everbrightson Sana Mylliempdah	Meghalaya	4
3	Naresh Bagyanathan	Kerala	4
3	Mahip Adhikari	Delhi	4
3	Jaideep Singh	Delhi	4
3	Mohammed Shareef P	Lakshadweep	4

=== Clean sheets ===
As of 30 January 2023

Rank	Player	State	Clean sheets
1	Suraj Mallick	Delhi	4
1	Rajat Paul Lyngdoh	Meghalaya	4
2	Neithovilie Chalieu	Nagaland	3
2	Harpreet Singh	Punjab	3

=== Hat-tricks ===
As of 12 January 2023

Rank	Player	State	Hat-tricks
1	Rasiq Ahmed Khan	Telangana	1 (vs Pondicherry)
1	Jaideep Singh	Delhi	1 (vs Ladakh)
1	Jay Kanani	Gujarat	1 (vs Tripura)
1	Mahip Adhikari	Delhi	1 (vs Gujarat)
1	Everbrighton Sana Mylliempdah	Meghalaya	1 (vs Andaman and Nicobar)
