= 2013–14 Santosh Trophy qualification =

This article details the 2013-14 Santosh Trophy qualifiers.

== East Zone ==
=== Group A ===
Team	Pld	W	D	L	GF	GA	GD	Pts
Services	2	2	0	0	5	0	+5	6
Sikkim	2	1	0	1	2	2	0	3
Jharkhand	2	0	0	2	1	6	-5	0

26 January 2014	Jharkhand	1–2	Sikkim	Paljor Stadium, Gangtok
	Kujur 58'	Report	Dewan 64'; Lachungpa 69'

28 January 2014	Services	4–0	Jharkhand	Paljor Stadium, Gangtok
	Khan 31'; Subo; Tudo; Rai	Report

30 January 2014	Sikkim	0–1	Services	Paljor Stadium, Gangtok
		Report	Ramniengmawia 42'

=== Group B ===
Team	Pld	W	D	L	GF	GA	GD	Pts
West Bengal	3	2	1	0	3	1	+2	7
Orissa	3	1	2	0	5	0	+5	5
Chhattisgarh	3	1	1	1	2	2	0	4
Bihar	3	0	0	3	2	9	-7	0

27 January 2014	West Bengal	1–0	Chhattisgarh	Paljor Stadium, Gangtok
	Murmu 25'	Report

27 January 2014	Orissa	5–0	Bihar	Paljor Stadium, Gangtok
	Mustakin 6'; Sahanwaz 33'; Sardar 51'; Zahid 76', 90+1'	Report

29 January 2014	Chhattisgarh	0–0	Orissa	Paljor Stadium, Gangtok
		Report

29 January 2014	Bihar	1–2	West Bengal	Paljor Stadium, Gangtok
	Aftab 68'	Report	Mandi 37'; Oraon 73'

31 January 2014	West Bengal	0–0	Orissa	Paljor Stadium, Gangtok
		Report

31 January 2014	Bihar	1–2	Chhattisgarh	Paljor Stadium, Gangtok
	Alam 74'	Report	Kumar 13'; Baxla 40'

== West Zone ==
=== Group A ===
Team	Pld	W	D	L	GF	GA	GD	Pts
Maharashtra	2	2	0	0	9	1	+8	6
Madhya Pradesh	2	0	1	1	2	5	-3	1
Gujarat	2	0	1	1	3	8	-5	1

30 January 2014	Gujarat	0–3	Maharashtra	Tilak Maidan Stadium, Vasco da Gama
		Report	Dias 6', 63'; Bhivgade 90+1'

1 February 2014	Gujarat	2–2	Madhya Pradesh	Tilak Maidan Stadium, Vasco da Gama
	Mayursingh 25'; Yuvraj 45'		N. Singh 3'; Kanojia 68'

3 February 2014	Madhya Pradesh	1–6	Maharashtra	Tilak Maidan Stadium, Vasco da Gama
	Das 90'	Report	Dias (15th); Machado 38'; Shivalkar 60', 71'; Dias 87'; Dsouza 88'

=== Group B ===
Team	Pld	W	D	L	GF	GA	GD	Pts
Goa	2	2	0	0	7	0	+7	6
Pondicherry	2	0	1	1	3	5	-2	1
Daman and Diu	2	0	1	1	3	8	-5	1

30 January 2014	Goa	5–0	Daman and Diu	Duler Stadium, Mapusa
	Sequeira 37'; Gawas 50'; Miranda 67', 79'; Fernandes 90+1'	Report

1 February 2014	Daman and Diu	3–3	Pondicherry	Duler Stadium, Mapusa
	Egypsio 45', 52', 60'		Karunanithi 70', 85'; Sugumaran 80'

3 February 2014	Pondicherry	0–2	Goa	Duler Stadium, Mapusa
		Report	Colaco; Miranda

== North-East Zone ==
=== Group A ===
Team	Pld	W	D	L	GF	GA	GD	Pts
Mizoram	3	3	0	0	10	0	+10	9
Manipur	3	2	0	1	12	3	+9	6
Nagaland	3	1	0	2	2	12	-10	3
Arunachal Pradesh	3	0	0	3	1	10	-9	0

27 January 2014	Mizoram	3–0	Nagaland	Lammual, Aizawl
	Zico 19'; Valpuia 31'; Fakzuala 69'	Report

27 January 2014	Arunachal Pradesh	1–3	Manipur	Lammual, Aizawl
	Drai 87'	Report	Naoton 5', 82'; Sushil 86'

29 January 2014	Nagaland	0–9	Manipur	Lammual, Aizawl
			Imran 13'; Hmar 20'; Riya 35'; Singh 50', 56', 85'; Meitei 76', 80', 90'

29 January 2014	Arunachal Pradesh	0–5	Mizoram	Lammual, Aizawl
		Report	Fakzual 4'; Zico 20', 53'; Valpuia 46'; William 90+1'

31 January 2014	Mizoram	2–0	Manipur	Lammual, Aizawl
	Laldanmawia 82'; Zico 90+5'	Report

31 January 2014	Nagaland	2–0	Arunachal Pradesh	Lammual, Aizawl
	Tiasunep 86'; Kulim 89'	Report

=== Group B ===
Team	Pld	W	D	L	GF	GA	GD	Pts
Railways	3	2	0	1	9	1	+8	6
Meghalaya	3	2	0	1	6	4	+2	6
Assam	3	1	1	1	5	6	-1	4
Tripura	3	0	1	2	2	11	-9	1

28 January 2014	Railways	7–0	Tripura	Lammual, Aizawl
	Keniston 2', 62', 67', 77'; Kisku 45'; Nazary 72'; Brahma 90+1'	Report

28 January 2014	Meghalaya	4–2	Assam	Lammual, Aizawl
	Kynta 4'; Timmy 34', 77'; Nongrum 82'	Report	Boro 21'; Avishek 29'

30 January 2014	Tripura	0–2	Meghalaya	Lammual, Aizawl
		Report	Eborminuam 45'; Timmy 67'

30 January 2014	Assam	1–0	Railways	Lammual, Aizawl
	Basumatry 89'	Report

1 February 2014	Railways	2–0	Meghalaya	Lammual, Aizawl
	Rajesh 25'; Kisku 86'	Report

1 February 2014	Assam	2–2	Tripura	Lammual, Aizawl
	Boro 51', 80'	Report	Jamatia 27', 88'

== South Zone ==
Team	Pld	W	D	L	GF	GA	GD	Pts
Tamil Nadu	4	3	1	0	15	2	+13	10
Kerala	4	3	0	1	23	4	+19	9
Karnataka	4	2	1	1	21	6	+15	7
Andhra Pradesh	4	1	0	3	8	11	-3	3
Andaman and Nicobar	4	0	0	4	1	45	-44	0

26 January 2014	Andhra Pradesh	5–0	Andaman and Nicobar	Jawaharlal Nehru Stadium, Chennai
	Shashank 18', 58', 77'; Tennyson 27'; Naidu 79'	Report

26 January 2014	Tamil Nadu	1–0	Kerala	Jawaharlal Nehru Stadium, Chennai
	Raegan 32'	Report

28 January 2014	Karnataka	13–0	Andaman and Nicobar	Jawaharlal Nehru Stadium, Chennai
	Ngurneilal 3', 13', 62'; Stephen 28', 33'; Bosco 37', 60', 69'; Xavier 38', 46'; Kumar 74'; Gopi 76'	Report

28 January 2014	Kerala	3–1	Andhra Pradesh	Jawaharlal Nehru Stadium, Chennai
	Usman 33', 71'; Kannan 49'	Report	Khaleel 59'

30 January 2014	Andaman and Nicobar	1–10	Tamil Nadu	Jawaharlal Nehru Stadium, Chennai
	Bernard 42'	Report	Raegan 15', 53', 81'; Kumar 29'; Sathish 32'; Patil 59'; Ameerudeen 82', 88', 90+1'; Charles 87'

30 January 2014	Karnataka	5–2	Andhra Pradesh	Jawaharlal Nehru Stadium, Chennai
	Xavier 20', 51'; Bosco 29'; Kumar 62'; Vignesh 69'	Report	Mouzzam 16'; Khaleel 79'

1 February 2014	Tamil Nadu	1–1	Karnataka	Jawaharlal Nehru Stadium, Chennai
	Raegan 9'	Report	B. Prakash 65'

1 February 2014	Andaman and Nicobar	0–17	Kerala	Jawaharlal Nehru Stadium, Chennai
		Report

3 February 2014	Karnataka	2–3	Kerala	Jawaharlal Nehru Stadium, Chennai
		Report		Referee: A. E. Simoes

3 February 2014	Tamil Nadu	4–0	Andhra Pradesh	Jawaharlal Nehru Stadium, Chennai
		Report

== North Zone ==
=== Group A ===
Team	Pld	W	D	L	GF	GA	GD	Pts
Uttarakhand	3	2	1	0	5	3	+2	7
Haryana	3	1	2	0	4	3	+1	5
Delhi	3	1	1	1	6	4	+2	4
Chandigarh	3	1	0	2	1	6	-5	0

30 January 2014	Haryana	2–1	Chandigarh	Ambedkar Stadium, New Delhi
	Rahul 15'; Abhishek 28'	Report	Singh 43'

30 January 2014	Delhi	2–3	Uttarakhand	Ambedkar Stadium, New Delhi
	Mamgain 59'; Rawat 67'	Report	Kalakoti 47'; Rawat 81', 87'

1 February 2014	Chandigarh	0–3	Delhi	Ambedkar Stadium, New Delhi
		Report	Choudhary 73', 90+1'; Rawat 86'

1 February 2014	Uttarakhand	1–1	Haryana	Ambedkar Stadium, New Delhi
	Kalakoti 38'	Report	Jaipal 20'

3 February 2014	Haryana	1–1	Delhi	Ambedkar Stadium, New Delhi
	Vikram 64'	Report	A. Rawat 28'

3 February 2014	Uttarakhand	1–0	Chandigarh	Ambedkar Stadium, New Delhi
	S. Rawat 84'	Report

=== Group B ===
Team	Pld	W	D	L	GF	GA	GD	Pts
Punjab	3	3	0	0	7	1	+6	9
Jammu and Kashmir	3	1	1	1	3	1	+2	4
Uttar Pradesh	3	1	0	2	1	7	–6	3
Himachal Pradesh	3	0	1	2	1	3	–2	1

31 January 2014	Punjab	2–1	Himachal Pradesh	Ambedkar Stadium, New Delhi
	S. Singh 66'; A. Singh 90+2'	Report	C. Singh 90'

31 January 2014	Uttar Pradesh	0–3	Jammu and Kashmir	Ambedkar Stadium, New Delhi
		Report	Mushtaq 6'; Majeed 21'; Ahmed 83'

2 February 2014	Himachal Pradesh	0–1	Uttar Pradesh	Ambedkar Stadium, New Delhi
		Report	Dubey 6'

2 February 2014	Jammu and Kashmir	0–1	Punjab	Ambedkar Stadium, New Delhi
		Report	G. Singh 38'

4 February 2014	Punjab	4–0	Uttar Pradesh	Ambedkar Stadium, New Delhi
	G. Singh 38'; A. Singh 73'; V. Kumar 74'; R. Singh 84'	Report

4 February 2014	Jammu and Kashmir	0–0	Himachal Pradesh	Ambedkar Stadium, New Delhi
		Report

AIFF 68th Santosh Trophy 2014
