= 2017–18 Santosh Trophy qualification =

Tournament details
- Country: India
- Teams: 34

Tournament statistics
- Matches played: 42
- Goals scored: 156 (3.71 per match)

The 2017–18 Santosh Trophy qualifiers was the qualifying round for the 72nd edition of the Santosh Trophy, the premier competition in India for teams representing their regional and state football associations.

== North Zone ==
The North Zone matches of the Santosh Trophy qualifiers were scheduled to start on 15 January 2018 in Uttar Pradesh. The North Zone qualifiers consisted of eight teams divided into two groups.

=== Group A ===
Pos	Team	Pld	W	D	L	GF	GA	GD	Pts	Qualification
1	Chandigarh	3	1	2	0	6	4	+2	5	Advance to Final Round
2	Haryana	3	1	1	1	4	3	+1	4	
3	Uttar Pradesh	3	1	1	1	5	5	0	4	
4	Uttarakhand	3	1	0	2	3	6	−3	3	

Source: Soccerway
Rules for classification: 1) points; 2) head-to-head points; 3) head-to-head goal difference; 4) goal difference; 5) number of goals scored; 6) drawing of lots

15 January 2018	Chandigarh	3–1	Uttarakhand	Noida
	B. Singh 13'; Joshi 70', 88'	Report	Rawat 27'

17 January 2018	Uttarakhand	2–1	Uttar Pradesh	Noida
	Mamgai 16'; Ansari 53'	Report	Azhar 77'

17 January 2018	Haryana	1–1	Chandigarh	Noida
	Kumar 38'	Report	Joshi 33'

19 January 2018	Uttar Pradesh	2–2	Chandigarh	Noida
	Yadav 6'; P. Singh 59'		Rana 74'; Joshi 85'

19 January 2018	Uttarakhand	0–2	Haryana	Noida
		Report	Manish 55'; Aditya 86'

21 January 2018	Uttar Pradesh	2–1	Haryana	Noida

=== Group B ===
Pos	Team	Pld	W	D	L	GF	GA	GD	Pts	Qualification
1	Punjab	3	3	0	0	4	0	+4	9	Advance to Final Round
2	Delhi	3	1	1	1	7	2	+5	4	
3	Jammu and Kashmir	3	1	1	1	6	2	+4	4	
4	Himachal Pradesh	3	0	0	3	1	13	−12	0	

Source: Soccerway
Rules for classification: 1) points; 2) head-to-head points; 3) head-to-head goal difference; 4) goal difference; 5) number of goals scored; 6) drawing of lots

16 January 2018	Delhi	1–1	Jammu and Kashmir	Noida
	John 90+'	Report	Farooq 52'

16 January 2018	Punjab	2–0	Himachal Pradesh	Noida
	K. Singh 44'; Jhamat 71'	Report

18 January 2018	Jammu and Kashmir	0–1	Punjab	Noida
	K. Singh 31' (pen.)	Report

18 January 2018	Himachal Pradesh	0–6	Delhi	Noida
		Report	P. Singh 8'; Thapa 24', 30', 70'; John 46'; Bisht 90+5'

20 January 2018	Punjab	1–0	Delhi	Noida
	Harjinder Singh 7'	Report

20 January 2018	Himachal Pradesh	1–5	Jammu and Kashmir	Noida
	Goal	Report	Aaakif Reshi; Asif; Raja Musharaf; Furqan

== East Zone ==
The East Zone qualifiers consisted of six teams divided into two groups of three.

=== Group A ===
Pos	Team	Pld	W	D	L	GF	GA	GD	Pts	Qualification
1	Odisha	2	1	1	0	2	0	+2	4	Advance to Final Round
2	Sikkim	2	1	0	1	3	2	+1	3	
3	Bihar	2	0	1	1	0	3	−3	1	

Source: Soccerway
Rules for classification: 1) points; 2) head-to-head points; 3) head-to-head goal difference; 4) goal difference; 5) number of goals scored; 6) drawing of lots

28 January 2018	Sikkim	3–0	Bihar	Patna
	Lama 21', 90+3' (pen.); Tamang 65'	Report

30 January 2018	Odisha	2–0	Sikkim	Patna
	Naik; Padhiary	Report

1 February 2018	Bihar	0–0	Odisha	Patna

=== Group B ===
Pos	Team	Pld	W	D	L	GF	GA	GD	Pts	Qualification
1	West Bengal	2	2	0	0	4	0	+4	6	Advance to Final Round
2	Jharkhand	2	1	0	1	1	2	−1	3	
3	Chhattisgarh	2	0	0	2	0	3	−3	0	

Source: Soccerway
Rules for classification: 1) points; 2) head-to-head points; 3) head-to-head goal difference; 4) goal difference; 5) number of goals scored; 6) drawing of lots

29 January 2018	West Bengal	2–0	Chhattisgarh	Patna
	Murmu (2 goals)

31 January 2018	Chhattisgarh	0–1	Jharkhand	Patna

2 February 2018	Jharkhand	0–2	West Bengal	Patna

== North-East Zone ==
=== Group A ===
Pos	Team	Pld	W	D	L	GF	GA	GD	Pts	Qualification
1	Mizoram	2	2	0	0	5	0	+5	6	Advance to Final Round
2	Assam	2	1	0	1	1	3	−2	3	
3	Arunachal Pradesh	2	0	0	2	0	3	−3	0	

Source: Soccerway
Rules for classification: 1) points; 2) head-to-head points; 3) head-to-head goal difference; 4) goal difference; 5) number of goals scored; 6) drawing of lots

8 January 2018	Assam	1–0	Arunachal Pradesh	Lammual, Mizoram
	Ete 73' (o.g.)	Report

10 January 2018	Arunachal Pradesh	0–2	Mizoram	Lammual, Mizoram
		Report	Malsawmtluanga; Lalrinchhana

12 January 2018	Mizoram	3–0	Assam	Lammual, Mizoram
	Lalromawia (2 goals); R Malsawmtluanga	Report

=== Group B ===
Pos	Team	Pld	W	D	L	GF	GA	GD	Pts	Qualification
1	Manipur	2	2	0	0	6	1	+5	6	Advance to Final Round
2	Meghalaya	2	1	0	1	6	3	+3	3	
3	Tripura	2	0	0	2	0	8	−8	0	

Source: Soccerway
Rules for classification: 1) points; 2) head-to-head points; 3) head-to-head goal difference; 4) goal difference; 5) number of goals scored; 6) drawing of lots

9 January 2018	Tripura	0–3	Manipur	Lammual, Mizoram
		Report	Pulamte 10'; Sharma 20'; Naocha 62'

11 January 2018	Meghalaya	5–0	Tripura	Lammual, Mizoram
	Pale 18', 19'; Diengdoh 44', 58'; Nongkhlaw 74'	Report

13 January 2018	Manipur	3–1	Meghalaya	Lammual, Mizoram
	Naocha 38', 60'; Pulamte 45'	Report	Diengdoh 65'

== West Zone ==
=== Group A ===
Pos	Team	Pld	W	D	L	GF	GA	GD	Pts	Qualification
1	Goa	2	2	0	0	22	1	+21	6	Advance to Final Round
2	Gujarat	2	0	1	1	6	13	−7	1	
3	Rajasthan	2	0	1	1	5	19	−14	1	

Source: Soccerway
Rules for classification: 1) points; 2) head-to-head points; 3) head-to-head goal difference; 4) goal difference; 5) number of goals scored; 6) drawing of lots

8 January 2018	Gujarat	5–5	Rajasthan	The Arena, Ahmedabad
	Mall 11', 64', 68'; Abbasi 38'; Krushnapal 90'	Report	I. Khan 3', 52'; Kaushik 12', 42'; Chundawat 56'

10 January 2018	Rajasthan	0–14	Goa	The Arena, Ahmedabad
		Report	D'Mello 7'; Carvalho 19'; Peixote 23', 50'; Fernandes 28', 43', 64', 79'; Pereira 76'; Hoble 84'; Carneiro 86'; Niasso 88', 90'; Castanha 90+3'

12 January 2018	Goa	8–1	Gujarat	The Arena, Ahmedabad

=== Group B ===
Pos	Team	Pld	W	D	L	GF	GA	GD	Pts	Qualification
1	Maharashtra	3	3	0	0	14	0	+14	9	Advance to Final Round
2	Lakshadweep	3	2	0	1	10	5	+5	6	
3	Daman and Diu	3	1	0	2	2	13	−11	3	
4	Madhya Pradesh	3	0	0	3	1	9	−8	0	

Source: Soccerway
Rules for classification: 1) points; 2) head-to-head points; 3) head-to-head goal difference; 4) goal difference; 5) number of goals scored; 6) drawing of lots

9 January 2018	Madhya Pradesh	0–5	Lakshadweep	The Arena, Ahmedabad
		Report	Shafeeq Jr 31', 39'; Shafeeq TD 42', 78', 82'

9 January 2018	Maharashtra	7–0	Daman and Diu	The Arena, Ahmedabad
	D'Costa 12'; Mangela (o.g.); Shinde 40'; Joshi 77'; Machado 81'; Stephen 86'; Menezes 90'	Report

11 January 2018	Lakshadweep	0–5	Maharashtra	The Arena, Ahmedabad
		Report	R. Singh 1', 26' (pen.), 35'; Bhokare 27'; D'Costa 49'

11 January 2018	Daman and Diu	2–1	Madhya Pradesh	The Arena, Ahmedabad

13 January 2018	Maharashtra	2–0	Madhya Pradesh	The Arena, Ahmedabad
	R. Singh (2 goals)	Report

13 January 2018	Daman and Diu	0–5	Lakshadweep	The Arena, Ahmedabad

== South Zone ==
The South Zone qualifiers consisted of eight teams divided into two groups of four. Matches were held at the Bangalore Football Stadium in Bangalore, Karnataka from 16 January to 22 January 2018.

In Group B, Andaman and Nicobar withdrew just before the qualifiers due to lack of funds to travel to Bangalore.

=== Group A ===
Pos	Team	Pld	W	D	L	GF	GA	GD	Pts	Qualification
1	Karnataka	3	3	0	0	11	1	+10	9	Advance to Final Round
2	Services	3	2	0	1	7	6	+1	6	
3	Telangana	3	1	0	2	5	7	−2	3	
4	Pondicherry	3	0	0	3	1	10	−9	0	

Source: Soccerway
Rules for classification: 1) points; 2) head-to-head points; 3) head-to-head goal difference; 4) goal difference; 5) number of goals scored; 6) drawing of lots

17 January 2018	Karnataka	5–0	Telangana	Bangalore Football Stadium, Karnataka
	S. Rajesh 7', 69'; Shil 18', 68'; Khan 83'	Report

17 January 2018	Services	4–1	Pondicherry	Bangalore Football Stadium, Karnataka
	Tudu 20'; N. Singh 59'; G. Singh 72'; Saji 86' (o.g.)	Report	Karthikeyan 9'

19 January 2018	Pondicherry	0–2	Karnataka	Bangalore Football Stadium, Karnataka
		Report Archived 2025-02-26 at the Wayback Machine(subscription required)	Khan 84'; Amoes Do 89'

19 January 2018	Telangana	1–2	Services	Bangalore Football Stadium, Karnataka
	Dhanala 59'	Report Archived 2025-02-26 at the Wayback Machine(subscription required)	N. Singh 25'; L. Singh 89'

21 January 2018	Karnataka	4–1	Services	Bangalore Football Stadium, Karnataka
	S.K. Azaruddin 10'; S. Rajesh 49', 72'; Solaimalai 89'	Report	Herojit 86'

21 January 2018	Telangana	4–0	Pondicherry	Bangalore Football Stadium, Karnataka
	Kumar 14', 64'; Abid 18', 60'	Report

=== Group B ===
Pos	Team	Pld	W	D	L	GF	GA	GD	Pts	Qualification
1	Kerala	2	1	1	0	7	0	+7	4	Advance to Final Round
2	Andhra Pradesh	2	0	0	2	0	8	−8	0	
3	Tamil Nadu	2	1	1	0	1	0	+1	4	

Source: Soccerway
Rules for classification: 1) points; 2) head-to-head points; 3) head-to-head goal difference; 4) goal difference; 5) number of goals scored; 6) drawing of lots

17 January 2018	Kerala	7–0	Andhra Pradesh	Bangalore Football Stadium, Karnataka
	Poulose 3'; Rahul KP 13', 49'; S. Vinod 16' (o.g.); Thomas 53'; Afdal VK 63', 75'	Report

19 January 2018	Andhra Pradesh	0–1	Tamil Nadu	Bangalore Football Stadium, Karnataka
		Report	Nagappan 57'

22 January 2018	Tamil Nadu	0–0	Kerala	Bangalore Football Stadium, Karnataka
		Report
