= 1999–2000 Santosh Trophy qualification =

1999–2000 1999–2000 Santosh Trophy qualifiers
Tournament details
- Country: India
- Teams: 28

Tournament statistics
- Matches played: 37
- Goals scored: 128 (3.46 per match)
- Top goal scorer: Sujit Chakravarty (9 goals)

The 1999–2000 Santosh Trophy qualifiers began on 19 March and ended on 8 April 2000. A total of 22 teams completed the qualifying phase and play-off round to decide four of the eight places in the final round.

A total of 28 teams entered the competition and were divided into eight 'clusters' with three or four teams in each cluster. Six teams — Sikkim, Mizoram, Andaman and Nicobar, Nagaland, Arunachal Pradesh and Meghalaya — pulled before the start of the competition reducing the number to 22. Following the round-robin stages, eight teams played the play-offs, and Services, Punjab, Karnataka and Maharashtra made it to the final round.

== Qualification ==
=== Cluster I ===
Pos	Team	Pld	W	D	L	GF	GA	GD	Pts	Qualification
1	Services	2	2	0	0	6	0	+6	6	Advance to Final Round
2	Gujarat	2	1	0	1	5	3	+2	3	
3	Rajasthan	2	0	0	2	0	7	−7	0	

Source: indianfootball.de
Rules for classification: 1) points; 2) goal difference; 3) goals scored; 4) head-to-head result.

19 March 2000	Services	3–0	Gujarat	Carmel School Stadium, Chalakudy
	X. Fernandes 5'; Sajith Kumar 56'; R. Das 76'	Report

21 March 2000	Rajasthan	0–5	Gujarat	Carmel School Stadium, Chalakudy
		Report	Rajiv Karir 9', 85'; Ranjit Sisodiya 30'; Anil Tomar 73'; AK Mondal 79'

23 March 2000	Rajasthan	0–3	Services	Carmel School Stadium, Chalakudy
		Report	Preetam Bahadur 2', 41'; Johnny Gangmei 53'

=== Cluster II ===
Pos	Team	Pld	W	D	L	GF	GA	GD	Pts	Qualification
1	Manipur	2	2	0	0	10	1	+9	6	Advance to Final Round
2	Bihar	2	1	0	1	7	2	+5	3	
3	Himachal Pradesh	2	0	0	2	0	14	−14	0	

Source: indianfootball.de
Rules for classification: 1) points; 2) goal difference; 3) goals scored; 4) head-to-head result.

26 March 2000	Bihar	6–0	Himachal Pradesh	Carmel School Stadium, Chalakudy
	Deepak Kumar Sinha 20'; Shamim Khan 23'; Amjad Hussain 44', 54'; Bablu Thapa 60'; Saluka Kalundia 72'	Report

27 March 2000	Manipur	8–0	Himachal Pradesh	Carmel School Stadium, Chalakudy
	Mangelm Jao Singh 28', 84' (pen.), 90'; Shyamchand 40'; Guneshwor 75'; Bantu Golmei 79'; Stephen Hmar 83'; Nilakumar 86'	Report

28 March 2000	Manipur	2–1	Bihar	Carmel School Stadium, Chalakudy
	T. Narendra Singh 49', 87'	Report	Saluka Kalundia 10'

=== Cluster III ===
Pos	Team	Pld	W	D	L	GF	GA	GD	Pts	Qualification
1	Railways	2	2	0	0	19	2	+17	6	Advance to Final Round
2	Andhra Pradesh	2	1	0	1	7	3	+4	3	
3	Daman and Diu	2	0	0	2	0	21	−21	0	

Source: indianfootball.de
Rules for classification: 1) points; 2) goal difference; 3) goals scored; 4) head-to-head result.

22 March 2000	Railways	16–0	Daman and Diu	Carmel School Stadium, Chalakudy
	Balai Mondal 5', 38', 44', 55', 77'; Manjinder Singh 13', 21', 30', 59'; Kamal Ghosh 25', 33', 52', 67'; Moin-ul-Haq 75'; Nazeem Riyazi 88'; Manjit Singh 89'	Report

24 March 2000	Andhra Pradesh	5–0	Daman and Diu	Carmel School Stadium, Chalakudy
	Syed Abdul Saleel 2'; Prasana Kumar 69'; Sriram 76'; Johnson 78'; Nagarjuna 79' (pen.)	Report

25 March 2000	Andhra Pradesh	2–3	Railways	Carmel School Stadium, Chalakudy
	Johnson 65', 87'	Report	Balai Mondal 25', 39'; Majinder Singh 40'

=== Cluster IV ===
Pos	Team	Pld	W	D	L	GF	GA	GD	Pts	Qualification
1	Punjab	2	2	0	0	3	0	+3	6	Advance to Final Round
2	Tripura	2	1	0	1	2	1	+1	3	
3	Pondicherry	2	0	0	2	0	4	−4	0	

Source: indianfootball.de
Rules for classification: 1) points; 2) goal difference; 3) goals scored; 4) head-to-head result.

2 April 2000	Pondicherry	0–2	Tripura	Carmel School Stadium, Chalakudy
		Report	Sujith Ghosh 6'; Arindam Ghosh 53'

3 April 2000	Punjab	1–0	Tripura	Carmel School Stadium, Chalakudy
	Kuldeep Singh 70'	Report

4 April 2000	Pondicherry	0–2	Punjab	Carmel School Stadium, Chalakudy
		Report	Jaswinder Singh 11', 69'

=== Cluster V ===
Pos	Team	Pld	W	D	L	GF	GA	GD	Pts	Qualification
1	Uttar Pradesh	2	1	1	0	3	2	+1	4	Advance to Final Round
2	Madhya Pradesh	2	0	2	0	1	1	0	2	
3	Assam	2	0	1	1	3	4	−1	1	

Source: indianfootball.de
Rules for classification: 1) points; 2) goal difference; 3) goals scored; 4) head-to-head result.

The first game of Cluster V was played between Uttar Pradesh and Assam on 1 April. However, at 30 minutes into the first half, play had to stopped due to rain. Assam were up 1–0 after a 20th minute penalty kick conversion by Akom Ao. The match was replayed the next day.

2 April 2000	Uttar Pradesh	3–2	Assam	Carmel School Stadium, Chalakudy
	Nandan Singh 42'; Ajay Singh Rawat 51'; Jatin Singh Bisht 86'	Report	Akum Ao 79', 84' (pen.)

3 April 2000	Madhya Pradesh	1–1	Assam	Carmel School Stadium, Chalakudy
	Mustak Ali Khan 19'	Report	Akum Ao 73' (pen.)

5 April 2000	Madhya Pradesh	0–0	Uttar Pradesh	Carmel School Stadium, Chalakudy
		Report

=== Cluster VI ===
Pos	Team	Pld	W	D	L	GF	GA	GD	Pts	Qualification
1	Karnataka	1	1	0	0	10	2	+8	3	Advance to Final Round
2	Jammu and Kashmir	1	0	0	1	2	10	−8	0	

Source: indianfootball.de
Rules for classification: 1) points; 2) goal difference; 3) goals scored; 4) head-to-head result.

5 April 2000	Karnataka	10–2	Jammu and Kashmir	Carmel School Stadium, Chalakudy
	RC Prakash 2', 31'; J. Murali 22'; Sunil 25', 27'; Peter 26', 47', 62', 81'; Vijay Kumar 28'	Report	Ranjeet Singh 32'; Gurmeet Singh 65' (pen.)

=== Cluster VII ===
Pos	Team	Pld	W	D	L	GF	GA	GD	Pts	Qualification
1	Orissa	2	1	1	0	2	1	+1	4	Advance to Final Round
2	Delhi	2	1	1	0	2	1	+1	4	
3	Chandigarh	2	0	0	2	2	4	−2	0	

Source: indianfootball.de
Rules for classification: 1) points; 2) goal difference; 3) goals scored; 4) head-to-head result.

29 March 2000	Chandigarh	1–2	Odisha	Carmel School Stadium, Chalakudy
	Rajeev Rattan 61'	Report	Meghrai Tudu 59'; Kapur Chand Yadav 78'

31 March 2000	Delhi	0–0	Orissa	Carmel School Stadium, Chalakudy
		Report

2 April 2000	Delhi	2–1	Chandigarh	Carmel School Stadium, Chalakudy
	Vimal Thapa 34'; Hitender Rawat 83'	Report	Viney Kanwar 8'

=== Cluster VIII ===
Pos	Team	Pld	W	D	L	GF	GA	GD	Pts	Qualification
1	Maharashtra	1	1	0	0	7	0	+7	3	Advance to Final Round
2	Haryana	1	0	0	1	0	7	−7	0	

Source: indianfootball.de
Rules for classification: 1) points; 2) goal difference; 3) goals scored; 4) head-to-head result.

7 April 2000	Maharashtra	7–0	Haryana	Carmel School Stadium, Chalakudy
	Mohammed Najeeb 24', 62'; Manjith Singh 28', 50'; Khalid Siddique 42'; Aqueel Ansari 64'; Asit Jamal 77'	Report

== Play-offs ==
The winner of each 'cluster' played a play-off game each and the final two qualification spots were determined.

30 March 2000	Services	4–0	Manipur	Carmel School Stadium, Chalakudy
	VK Mishra 15'; Amar Bahadur Thapa 35'; Johnny Gangmei 44'; Sajith Kumar 75' (pen.)	Report

7 April 2000	Railways	0–2	Punjab	Carmel School Stadium, Chalakudy
		Report	Jaswinder Singh 65'; Ram Pal 80'

7 April 2000	Uttar Pradesh	0–2	Karnataka	Carmel School Stadium, Chalakudy
		Report	Peter 53'; Sunil 57'

8 April 2000	Orissa	1–5	Maharashtra	Carmel School Stadium, Chalakudy
	Nipendra Das 32'	Report	Mohammed Najeeb 22', 35', 79'; Manjith Singh 30'; Ali Abbas Rizvi 75'
