= 2014–15 Santosh Trophy qualification =

This article details the 2015 Santosh Trophy qualifiers.

== Format ==
Qualifiers will start from 10 January to 23 January 2015 and will consist of 33 teams. Top 2 teams from each zone will make it to the final round.

== East Zone ==
=== Group A ===
Team	Pld	W	D	L	GF	GA	GD	Pts
West Bengal	2	2	0	0	3	1	+2	6
Bihar	2	1	0	1	1	1	0	3
Jharkhand	2	0	0	2	1	3	-2	0

15 January 2015	Jharkhand	0–1	Bihar	Gopal Maidan, Jamshedpur
		Report	Samant Kumar 78'

17 January 2015	West Bengal	1–0	Bihar	JRD Tata Sports Complex, Jamshedpur
	Surabuddin Mollick 48'	Report

19 January 2015	West Bengal	2–1	Jharkhand	JRD Tata Sports Complex, Jamshedpur
	Nilkanta Paria 32'; Konsham Sana 69' (o.g.)	Report	Iban Kupar 82' (pen.)

=== Group B ===
Team	Pld	W	D	L	GF	GA	GD	Pts
Railways	3	2	1	0	9	2	+7	7
Orissa	3	1	2	0	4	1	+3	5
Sikkim	3	1	1	1	7	6	+1	4
Chhattisgarh	3	0	0	3	1	12	-11	0

16 January 2015	Railways	4–1	Chhattisgarh	JRD Tata Sports Complex, Jamshedpur
	Keniston C 1', 26'; PC Raju 3', 60'	Report	Junaid Ali Khan 72'

16 January 2015	Orissa	1–1	Sikkim	JRD Tata Sports Complex, Jamshedpur
	SK Zahid 26'	Report	Sukhraj Limboo 9'

18 January 2015	Chhattisgarh	0–3	Orissa	Gopal Maidan, Jamshedpur
		Report	Surendra Soren 30'; Antarjami Naik 54', 68'

18 January 2015	Railways	5–1	Sikkim	JRD Tata Sports Complex, Jamshedpur
	Sushil Kisku 16', 21' (pen.); Keniston C 72', 79'; Charlesnand Rai 44'	Report	Dawa Lepcha 44'

20 January 2015	Railways	0–0	Orissa	JRD Tata Sports Complex, Jamshedpur

20 January 2015	Sikkim	5–0	Chhattisgarh	JRD Tata Sports Complex, Jamshedpur

== North Zone ==
=== Group A ===
Team	Pld	W	D	L	GF	GA	GD	Pts
Punjab	3	2	1	0	11	0	+11	7
Uttarakhand	3	2	0	1	5	8	-3	6
Uttar Pradesh	3	1	0	2	3	7	-4	3
Chandigarh	3	0	1	2	1	5	-4	1

10 January 2015	Punjab	0–0	Chandigarh	Guru Gobind Singh Stadium, Jalandhar
		Report

10 January 2015	Uttar Pradesh	1–2	Uttarakhand	Guru Gobind Singh Stadium, Jalandhar
	V. Kumar 16'	Report	S. Rawat 35', 52'

12 January 2015	Punjab	4–0	Uttar Pradesh	Guru Gobind Singh Stadium, Jalandhar
	A. Singh 11', 50'; R. Singh 38' (pen.); T. Singh 63'	Report

12 January 2015	Uttarakhand	3–0	Chandigarh	Guru Gobind Singh Stadium, Jalandhar
	A. Singh 60'; J. Novbu 69', 80'	Report

14 January 2015	Chandigarh	1–2	Uttar Pradesh	Guru Gobind Singh Stadium, Jalandhar

14 January 2015	Uttarakhand	0–7	Punjab	Guru Gobind Singh Stadium, Jalandhar

=== Group B ===
Team	Pld	W	D	L	GF	GA	GD	Pts
Delhi	3	2	1	0	5	0	+5	7
Haryana	3	1	2	0	3	0	+3	5
Jammu & Kashmir	3	1	1	1	3	2	+1	4
Himachal Pradesh	3	0	0	3	1	10	-9	0

11 January 2015	Delhi	4–0	Himachal Pradesh	Guru Gobind Singh Stadium, Jalandhar
	A. Rawat 21'; Devrani 36'; D. Mehra 55'; A. Rana 58'	Report

11 January 2015	Haryana	0–0	Jammu and Kashmir	Guru Gobind Singh Stadium, Jalandhar
		Report

13 January 2015	Himachal Pradesh	0–3	Haryana	Guru Gobind Singh Stadium, Jalandhar
		Report	Anil 12'; Sandeep 35'; Arvind 72'

13 January 2015	Jammu and Kashmir	0–1	Delhi	Guru Gobind Singh Stadium, Jalandhar
		Report	A. Rana 12'

15 January 2015	Delhi	0–0	Haryana	Guru Gobind Singh Stadium, Jalandhar

15 January 2015	Jammu and Kashmir	3–1	Himachal Pradesh	Guru Gobind Singh Stadium, Jalandhar

== North East Zone ==
=== Group A ===
Team	Pld	W	D	L	GF	GA	GD	Pts
Assam	3	3	0	0	11	0	+11	9
Manipur	3	2	0	1	6	2	+4	6
Arunachal Pradesh	2	0	1	2	1	8	-7	1
Nagaland	2	0	1	2	1	9	-8	1

18 January 2015	Manipur	3–0	Nagaland	Khirod Baruah Stadium, Marigaon
	Clever Hmar 9'; Kh Nauton Singh 45'; L Gogocha 55'	Report

18 January 2015	Arunachal Pradesh	0–4	Assam	Khirod Baruah Stadium, Marigaon
		Report	Mintu Boro 20'; Suraj Mandal 32', 45+1', 60'

20 January 2015	Nagaland	0–5	Assam	Khirod Baruah Stadium, Marigaon
		Report	Mintu Boro 11', 63'; Suraj Mandal 40'; Mandela Rongmei 84'; F Wary 90+1'

20 January 2015	Arunachal Pradesh	0–3	Manipur	Khirod Baruah Stadium, Marigaon
			Kh Naoton 37', 55'; Inao 85'

22 January 2015	Assam	2–0	Manipur	Khirod Baruah Stadium, Marigaon
	Suraj Mandal 57', 65'	Report

22 January 2015	Nagaland	1–1	Arunachal Pradesh	Khirod Baruah Stadium, Marigaon
	Saku Tenjam 45' (pen.)	Report	Pami Raju 35'

=== Group B ===
Team	Pld	W	D	L	GF	GA	GD	Pts
Mizoram	2	2	0	0	5	0	+5	6
Meghalaya	2	1	0	1	3	3	0	3
Tripura	2	0	0	2	0	5	-5	0

19 January 2015	Mizoram	2–0	Tripura	Khirod Baruah Stadium, Marigaon
	Samson 85'; Lal Muankima 86'	Report

21 January 2015	Meghalaya	3–0	Tripura	Khirod Baruah Stadium, Marigaon
	Fullmoon 46'; Edormi Buam 55'; Bickyson	Report

23 January 2015	Meghalaya	0–3	Mizoram	Khirod Baruah Stadium, Marigaon
		Report	Joseph Lalmunpuia 3'; Malsawmfela 89' (pen.); H Lalwantima

== South Zone ==
=== Group A ===
Team	Pld	W	D	L	GF	GA	GD	Pts
Kerala	2	2	0	0	10	0	+10	6
Karnataka	2	1	0	1	2	5	-3	3
Andhra Pradesh	2	0	0	2	1	8	-7	0

15 January 2015	Kerala	6–0	Andhra Pradesh	MDS Complex, Manjeri
	Suhair 41', 45+1', 90'; Shibinlal 51', 81'; Shyjumon 90+1'	Report

17 January 2015	Andhra Pradesh	1–2	Karnataka	MDS Complex, Manjeri
	Mohammed Moazzam 41'	Report	V. Kumar 43' (pen.); K Gopi 47'

19 January 2015	Kerala	4–0	Karnataka	MDS Complex, Manjeri
	Usman Ashik 8', 25'; Joby Justin 70'; U.Jimshad 74'	Report

=== Group B ===
Team	Pld	W	D	L	GF	GA	GD	Pts
Services	2	2	0	0	11	1	+10	6
Tamil Nadu	2	1	0	1	10	3	+7	3
Pondicherry	2	0	0	2	0	17	-17	0

16 January 2015	Services	8–0	Pondicherry	MDS Complex, Manjeri
	Francis Zonun Tulunga 10'; Shadip Rai 22', 42'; P. Jain 24'; Arjun Tudu 26'; Vishnu Nair 32' (o.g.); Mawia 41', 75'	Report

18 January 2015	Pondicherry	0–9	Tamil Nadu	MDS Complex, Manjeri
		Report	A Raegan 6', 8', 15', 21', 25', 72', 90'; H Amirudin 11'; Praveen Kumar 41'

20 January 2015	Tamil Nadu	1–3	Services	MDS Complex, Manjeri
	Praveendaran 24'	Report	Arjun Tudu; Sandip Rai 56'; Vivek Kumar 76'

== West Zone ==
Team	Pld	W	D	L	GF	GA	GD	Pts
Goa	4	4	0	0	23	3	+20	12
Maharashtra	4	3	0	1	15	3	+12	9
Gujarat	4	2	0	2	6	2	+4	6
Madhya Pradesh	4	1	0	3	7	10	-3	3
Daman & Diu	4	0	0	4	3	35	-32	0

10 January 2015	Gujarat	5–1	Daman & Diu	Race Course Football Ground, Rajkot

11 January 2015	Maharashtra	1–2	Goa	Race Course Football Ground, Rajkot
	Shahnawaz Pathane 80'		Masceranhas 8'; Peixote 28'

12 January 2015	Gujarat	1–0	Madhya Pradesh	Race Course Football Ground, Rajkot

13 January 2015	Daman & Diu	1–17	Goa	Race Course Football Ground, Rajkot

15 January 2015	Maharashtra	5–0	Madhya Pradesh	Race Course Football Ground, Rajkot
	Praveen Sharma 31', 36'; Patil 60', 70'; Shahnawz Pathane 62'

16 January 2015	Gujarat	0–1	Goa	Race Course Football Ground, Rajkot
			Jerose Oliveira 50'

17 January 2015	Madhya Pradesh	6–1	Daman & Diu	Race Course Football Ground, Rajkot

18 January 2015	Maharashtra	2–1	Gujarat	Race Course Football Ground, Rajkot

19 January 2015	Goa	3–1	Madhya Pradesh	Race Course Football Ground, Rajkot

20 January 2015	Maharashtra	7–0	Daman & Diu	Race Course Football Ground, Rajkot
