= 2010–11 Santosh Trophy =

2012 Santosh Trophy
Tournament details
- Country: India
- Teams: 31

Final positions
- Champions: West Bengal (31st title)
- Runners-up: Manipur

The 65th National Football Championship for Santosh Trophy 2010–11 was held in Assam, India, 6–30 May 2011. 31 teams were divided into eight clusters with last year's semi-finalists (West Bengal, Punjab, Tamil Nadu and Goa) directly finding their place in the Groups Quarterfinal round.

The Preliminary Round matches were held from 6 to 16 May, while the quarter final round matches took place from 17 to 24 May. The first semi-final was held on 26 May, while the second semi-final will be played on 27 May with grand finale being held on 30 May.

All together seven venues held the matches of the Santosh Trophy in Assam. Cluster I and V matches were played in Guwahati, Cluster II matches were played in Mangaldoi, Cluster III matches will be played in Shiv Sagar, Cluster V matches will take place in Tinsukia, while Cluster VI, VIII and VIII matches will be held in Nagaon, Bongaigaon and Kokrajhar respectively.

== Clusters ==
- Cluster I: Assam, Pondicherry, Rajasthan.
- Cluster II: Chhattisgarh, Daman & Diu, Gujarat & Uttar Pradesh.
- Cluster III: Manipur, Andhra Pradesh, Bihar & Andaman & Nicobar.
- Cluster IV: Kerala, Jammu & Kashmir, Jharkhand, Chandigarh.
- Cluster V: Karnataka, Uttarakhand, Services, Arunachal Pradesh.
- Cluster VI: Delhi, Nagaland, Orissa & Himachal Pradesh.
- Cluster VII: Mizoram, Haryana, Madhya Pradesh, Tripura.
- Cluster VIII: Maharashtra, Meghalaya, Railways, Sikkim.

== Preliminary round ==
Fixtures:

- Note - The first tie-breaker for teams finishing level on points is the head-to-head result between the teams concerned, followed by overall goal difference, and then overall goals scored.

=== Cluster I ===
Points
Team	Pld	W	D	L	GF	GA	GD	Pts
Assam	2	2	0	0	19	1	+18	6
Pondicherry	2	0	1	1	3	10	−7	1
Rajasthan	2	0	1	1	2	13	−11	1

Source: AIFF

Date	Team 1	Score	Team 2
06/05/11	Assam	8–1	Pondicherry
08/05/11	Pondicherry	2–2	Rajasthan
10/05/11	Assam	11–0	Rajasthan

=== Cluster II ===
Points
Team	Pld	W	D	L	GF	GA	GD	Pts
Chhattisgarh	3	2	1	0	13	1	+12	7
Uttar Pradesh	3	2	1	0	12	2	+10	7
Gujarat	3	1	0	2	7	8	−1	3
Daman & Diu	3	0	0	3	2	23	−21	0

Source: AIFF

Date	Team 1	Score	Team 2
06/05/11	Chhattisgarh	9–0	Daman & Diu
06/05/11	Uttar Pradesh	3–1	Gujarat
08/05/11	Chhattisgarh	1–1	Uttar Pradesh
08/05/11	Gujarat	6–2	Daman & Diu
10/05/11	Chhattisgarh	3–0	Gujarat
10/05/11	Uttar Pradesh	8–0	Daman & Diu

=== Cluster III ===
Points
Team	Pld	W	D	L	GF	GA	GD	Pts
Manipur	2	2	0	0	16	2	+14	6
Andaman & Nicobar	2	1	0	1	3	13	−10	3
Bihar	2	0	0	2	2	6	−4	0

Source: AIFF

Date	Team 1	Score	Team 2
06/05/11	Manipur	4–1	Bihar
08/05/11	Manipur	12–1	Andaman
10/05/11	Andaman	2–1	Bihar

=== Cluster IV ===
Points
Team	Pld	W	D	L	GF	GA	GD	Pts
Kerala	3	2	1	0	8	1	+7	7
Jharkhand	3	2	0	1	4	5	−1	6
Chandigarh	3	1	1	1	2	2	0	4
Jammu & Kashmir	3	0	0	3	2	8	−6	0

Source: AIFF

Date	Team 1	Score	Team 2
07/05/11	Jharkhand	2–1	Chandigarh
07/05/11	Kerala	5–1	Jammu & Kashmir
09/05/11	Chandigarh	0–0	Kerala
09/05/11	Jharkhand	2–1	Jammu & Kashmir
11/05/11	Chandigarh	1–0	Jammu & Kashmir
11/05/11	Kerala	3–0	Jharkhand

=== Cluster V ===
Points
Team	Pld	W	D	L	GF	GA	GD	Pts
Services	3	3	0	0	10	0	+10	9
Uttarakhand	3	2	0	1	2	3	−1	6
Arunachal Pradesh	3	0	1	2	1	5	−4	1
Karnataka	3	0	1	2	1	6	−5	1

Source: AIFF

Date	Team 1	Score	Team 2
12/05/11	Services	4–0	Karnataka
12/05/11	Uttarakhand	1–0	Arunachal Pradesh
14/05/11	Arunachal Pradesh	1–1	Karnataka
14/05/11	Services	3–0	Uttarakhand
16/05/11	Karnataka	0–1	Uttarakhand
16/05/11	Services	3–0	Arunachal Pradesh

=== Cluster VI ===
Points
Team	Pld	W	D	L	GF	GA	GD	Pts
Delhi	3	3	0	0	12	2	+10	9
Orissa	3	2	0	1	11	6	+5	6
Nagaland	3	1	0	2	4	7	−3	3
Himachal Pradesh	3	0	0	3	2	14	−12	0

Source: AIFF

Date	Team 1	Score	Team 2
12/05/11	Delhi	2–0	Nagaland
12/05/11	Orissa	6–0	Himachal Pradesh
14/05/11	Delhi	4–1	Himachal Pradesh
14/05/11	Orissa	4–0	Nagaland
16/05/11	Delhi	6–1	Orissa
16/05/11	Nagaland	4–1	Himachal Pradesh

=== Cluster VII ===
Points
Team	Pld	W	D	L	GF	GA	GD	Pts
Tripura	3	2	0	1	8	3	+5	6
Mizoram	3	2	0	1	14	3	+11	6
Madhya Pradesh	3	1	0	2	3	15	−12	3
Haryana	3	1	0	2	4	8	−4	3

Source: AIFF

Date	Team 1	Score	Team 2
12/05/11	Madhya Pradesh	3–2	Haryana
12/05/11	Tripura	3–1	Mizoram
14/05/11	Haryana	2–0	Tripura
14/05/11	Mizoram	8–0	Madhya Pradesh
16/05/11	Tripura	5–0	Madhya Pradesh
16/05/11	Mizoram	5–0	Haryana

=== Cluster VIII ===
Points
Team	Pld	W	D	L	GF	GA	GD	Pts
Railways	3	3	0	0	6	0	+6	9
Maharashtra	3	2	0	1	7	3	+4	6
Sikkim	3	0	1	2	2	5	−3	1
Meghalaya	3	0	1	2	2	9	−7	1

Source: AIFF

Date	Team 1	Score	Team 2
12/05/11	Maharashtra	2–1	Sikkim
12/05/11	Railways	3–0	Meghalaya
14/05/11	Railways	1–0	Maharashtra
14/05/11	Meghalaya	1–1	Sikkim
16/05/11	Maharashtra	5–1	Meghalaya
16/05/11	Railways	2–0	Sikkim

=== Pre-Quarter-Final League playoffs ===
Date	Team 1	Score	Team 2
12/05/11	Assam	2–4	Chhattisgarh
13/05/11	Manipur	0–0 (7–6 p)	Kerala
18/05/11	Services	2–0 (a.e.t.)	Delhi
18/05/11	Tripura	0–3	Railways

== Second round ==
=== Quarter-Final League ===
==== Group A ====
Points
Team	Pld	W	D	L	GF	GA	GD	Pts
Manipur	3	2	1	0	7	3	+4	7
West Bengal	3	1	1	1	7	5	+2	4
Tamil Nadu	3	1	0	2	5	6	−1	3
Chhattisgarh	3	1	0	2	4	9	−5	3

Source: AIFF

Date	Team 1	Score	Team 2
17/05/11	Manipur	2–1	Tamil Nadu
17/05/11	West Bengal	4–1	Chhattisgarh
19/05/11	Tamil Nadu	2–3	Chhattisgarh
19/05/11	West Bengal	2–2	Manipur
21/05/11	Manipur	3–0	Chhattisgarh
21/05/11	West Bengal	1–2	Tamil Nadu

==== Group B ====
Points
Team	Pld	W	D	L	GF	GA	GD	Pts
Railways	3	2	1	0	7	3	+4	7
Services	3	0	3	0	7	7	0	3
Goa	3	0	2	1	5	8	−3	2
Punjab	3	0	2	1	4	6	−2	2

Source: AIFF

Date	Team 1	Score	Team 2
20/05/11	Goa	0–3	Railways
20/05/11	Punjab	2–2	Services
22/05/11	Goa	3–3	Services
22/05/11	Punjab	1–2	Railways
24/05/11	Goa	0–0	Punjab
24/05/11	Services	2–2	Railways

=== Semi-finals ===
Date	Team 1	Score	Team 2
26/05/11	Manipur	1–0	Services
27/05/11	Railways	0–1	West Bengal

== Final ==
30 May 2011
17:30 IST

Manipur	1–2	West Bengal
N. Singh 75'	Report	Cardozo 21'; Tudu 48'

Nehru Stadium, Guwahati
