= 2001–02 Santosh Trophy =

57th Senior National Football Championship

Tournament details
- Country: India
- Date: 1–17 November 2001
- Teams: 12

Final positions
- Champions: Kerala (4th title)
- Runners-up: Goa

The 2001–02 Santosh Trophy was the 57th edition of the Santosh Trophy, the main State competition for football in India. It was held from 1 November 2001 till 17 November 2001 in Mumbai, Maharashtra. Thirty-two teams from all over the country, representing numerous states intended to take part in the national state championships but six teams pulled out. At the final Kerala won 3–2, on a Golden Goal scored by Abdul Hakim during extra time against Goa.

== Qualifying rounds ==
=== Cluster I ===
| Pos | Team | Pld | W | D | L | GF | GA | GD | Pts | Qualification |
|---|---|---|---|---|---|---|---|---|---|---|
| 1 | Services | 2 | 2 | 0 | 0 | 16 | 2 | +14 | 6 | Advance to Quarterfinal League |
| 2 | Rajasthan | 2 | 0 | 0 | 2 | 2 | 16 | −14 | 0 | |
| 3 | Meghalaya | 0 | 0 | 0 | 0 | 0 | 0 | 0 | 0 | Withdrawn |
| 4 | Sikkim | 0 | 0 | 0 | 0 | 0 | 0 | 0 | 0 | Withdrawn |

Source: indianfootball.de
Rules for classification: 1) points; 2) goal difference; 3) goals scored; 4) head-to-head result.

=== Cluster II ===
| Pos | Team | Pld | W | D | L | GF | GA | GD | Pts | Qualification |
|---|---|---|---|---|---|---|---|---|---|---|
| 1 | Manipur | 2 | 2 | 0 | 0 | 10 | 0 | +10 | 6 | Advance to Quarterfinal League |
| 2 | Haryana | 2 | 1 | 0 | 1 | 7 | 4 | +3 | 3 | |
| 3 | Himachal Pradesh | 1 | 0 | 0 | 1 | 1 | 14 | −13 | 0 | |

Source: indianfootball.de
Rules for classification: 1) points; 2) goal difference; 3) goals scored; 4) head-to-head result.

=== Cluster III ===
| Pos | Team | Pld | W | D | L | GF | GA | GD | Pts | Qualification |
|---|---|---|---|---|---|---|---|---|---|---|
| 1 | Railways | 2 | 1 | 0 | 1 | 4 | 1 | +3 | 3 | Advance to Quarterfinal League |
| 2 | Andhra Pradesh | 2 | 1 | 0 | 1 | 1 | 4 | −3 | 3 | |
| 3 | Mizoram | 0 | 0 | 0 | 0 | 0 | 0 | 0 | 0 | Withdrawn |
| 4 | Nagaland | 0 | 0 | 0 | 0 | 0 | 0 | 0 | 0 | Withdrawn |

Source: indianfootball.de
Rules for classification: 1) points; 2) goal difference; 3) goals scored; 4) head-to-head result.

=== Cluster IV ===
| Pos | Team | Pld | W | D | L | GF | GA | GD | Pts | Qualification |
|---|---|---|---|---|---|---|---|---|---|---|
| 1 | Punjab | 2 | 2 | 0 | 0 | 8 | 0 | +8 | 6 | Advance to Quarterfinal League |
| 2 | Uttar Pradesh | 2 | 1 | 0 | 1 | 5 | 6 | −1 | 3 | |
| 3 | Tripura | 2 | 0 | 0 | 2 | 2 | 9 | −7 | 0 | |

Source: indianfootball.de
Rules for classification: 1) points; 2) goal difference; 3) goals scored; 4) head-to-head result.

=== Cluster V ===
| Pos | Team | Pld | W | D | L | GF | GA | GD | Pts | Qualification |
|---|---|---|---|---|---|---|---|---|---|---|
| 1 | Assam | 2 | 2 | 0 | 0 | 6 | 0 | +6 | 6 | Advance to Quarterfinal League |
| 2 | Madhya Pradesh | 2 | 1 | 0 | 1 | 4 | 3 | +1 | 3 | |
| 3 | Pondicherry | 2 | 0 | 0 | 2 | 1 | 8 | −7 | 0 | |
| 4 | Andaman and Nicobar Islands | 0 | 0 | 0 | 0 | 0 | 0 | 0 | 0 | Withdrawn |

Source: indianfootball.de
Rules for classification: 1) points; 2) goal difference; 3) goals scored; 4) head-to-head result.

=== Cluster VI ===
| Pos | Team | Pld | W | D | L | GF | GA | GD | Pts | Qualification |
|---|---|---|---|---|---|---|---|---|---|---|
| 1 | Karnataka | 2 | 2 | 0 | 0 | 17 | 1 | +16 | 6 | Advance to Quarterfinal League |
| 2 | Jammu and Kashmir | 2 | 1 | 0 | 1 | 6 | 8 | −2 | 3 | |
| 3 | Daman and Diu | 2 | 0 | 0 | 2 | 1 | 15 | −14 | 0 | |

Source: indianfootball.de
Rules for classification: 1) points; 2) goal difference; 3) goals scored; 4) head-to-head result.

=== Cluster VII ===
| Pos | Team | Pld | W | D | L | GF | GA | GD | Pts | Qualification |
|---|---|---|---|---|---|---|---|---|---|---|
| 1 | Orissa | 2 | 1 | 1 | 0 | 3 | 2 | +1 | 4 | Advance to Quarterfinal League |
| 2 | Delhi | 2 | 1 | 0 | 1 | 6 | 2 | +4 | 3 | |
| 3 | Chandigarh | 2 | 0 | 1 | 1 | 1 | 6 | −5 | 1 | |
| 4 | Arunachal Pradesh | 0 | 0 | 0 | 0 | 0 | 0 | 0 | 0 | Withdrawn |

Source: indianfootball.de
Rules for classification: 1) points; 2) goal difference; 3) goals scored; 4) head-to-head result.

=== Cluster VIII ===
| Pos | Team | Pld | W | D | L | GF | GA | GD | Pts | Qualification |
|---|---|---|---|---|---|---|---|---|---|---|
| 1 | Tamil Nadu | 2 | 1 | 1 | 0 | 3 | 2 | +1 | 4 (Note: Tamil Nadu move on by a toss of a coin) | Advance to Quarterfinal League |
| 2 | Gujarat | 2 | 1 | 1 | 0 | 3 | 2 | +1 | 4 | |
| 3 | Bihar | 2 | 0 | 0 | 2 | 2 | 4 | −2 | 0 | |

Source: indianfootball.de
Rules for classification: 1) points; 2) goal difference; 3) goals scored; 4) head-to-head result.

== Quarterfinal League ==
=== Group A ===
| Pos | Team | Pld | W | D | L | GF | GA | GD | Pts | Qualification |
|---|---|---|---|---|---|---|---|---|---|---|
| 1 | Kerala | 2 | 2 | 0 | 0 | 8 | 3 | +5 | 6 | Advance to Semi-finals |
| 2 | Assam | 2 | 1 | 0 | 1 | 5 | 5 | 0 | 3 | |
| 3 | Orissa | 2 | 0 | 0 | 2 | 1 | 6 | −5 | 0 | |

Source: indianfootball.de
Rules for classification: 1) points; 2) goal difference; 3) goals scored; 4) head-to-head result.

=== Group B ===
| Pos | Team | Pld | W | D | L | GF | GA | GD | Pts | Qualification |
|---|---|---|---|---|---|---|---|---|---|---|
| 1 | Tamil Nadu | 2 | 1 | 1 | 0 | 3 | 2 | +1 | 4 | Advance to Semi-finals |
| 2 | Karnataka | 2 | 0 | 2 | 0 | 2 | 2 | 0 | 2 | |
| 3 | Bengal | 2 | 0 | 1 | 1 | 0 | 1 | −1 | 1 | |

Source: indianfootball.de
Rules for classification: 1) points; 2) goal difference; 3) goals scored; 4) head-to-head result.

=== Group C ===
| Pos | Team | Pld | W | D | L | GF | GA | GD | Pts | Qualification |
|---|---|---|---|---|---|---|---|---|---|---|
| 1 | Railways | 2 | 1 | 1 | 0 | 4 | 1 | +3 | 4 | Advance to Semi-finals |
| 2 | Maharashtra | 2 | 1 | 1 | 0 | 4 | 2 | +2 | 4 | |
| 3 | Services | 2 | 0 | 0 | 2 | 1 | 6 | −5 | 0 | |

Source: indianfootball.de
Rules for classification: 1) points; 2) goal difference; 3) goals scored; 4) head-to-head result.

=== Group D ===
| Pos | Team | Pld | W | D | L | GF | GA | GD | Pts | Qualification |
|---|---|---|---|---|---|---|---|---|---|---|
| 1 | Goa | 2 | 2 | 0 | 0 | 2 | 0 | +2 | 6 | Advance to Semi-finals |
| 2 | Punjab | 2 | 1 | 0 | 1 | 4 | 1 | +3 | 3 | |
| 3 | Manipur | 2 | 0 | 0 | 2 | 0 | 5 | −5 | 0 | |

Source: indianfootball.de
Rules for classification: 1) points; 2) goal difference; 3) goals scored; 4) head-to-head result.

== Semi-finals ==
15 November 2001
14:15 IST

| Kerala | 5–3 | Tamil Nadu |
|---|---|---|
| Saheer 30', 43'; Abdul Hakim 38', 52', 53' | Report | Mohammed Islam 10'; Pasha 62', 71' |

Cooperage Ground, Mumbai

15 November 2001
16:15 IST

| Goa | 0–0 (a.e.t.) | Railways |
|---|---|---|
| | Report Archived 2022-05-04 at the Wayback Machine(subscription required) |
Penalties
| Miranda (penalty scored); Wilson (penalty scored); Rocky Barretto (penalty scored); Jose Colaco (penalty scored) | 4–2 | (penalty scored) Kashif Jamal; (penalty scored) Surjit Tigga |

Cooperage Ground, Mumbai

== Final ==
17 November 2001
15:00 IST

| Kerala | 3–2 | Goa |
|---|---|---|
| Abdul Hakim 13', 20', 106' | Report | Abhay Kumar 3'; Wilson 47' |

Cooperage Ground, Mumbai

== Statistics ==
Leading scorer: 1. Abdul Hakkim (Kerala) – 7 goals, 2. Asif Saheer (Kerala)

List of Awardees:
Fair Play Trophy: Railways & Tamil Nadu
