= 2015–16 Santosh Trophy qualification =

2016 Santosh Trophy
Tournament details
- Country: India
- Teams: 34

Tournament statistics
- Matches played: 48
- Goals scored: 162 (3.38 per match)

This article details the 2016 Santosh Trophy qualifiers.

== Format ==
Qualifiers are being held from 6 February to 23 February 2016 and consist of 35 teams. Top 2 teams from each zone will make it to the final round.

== North Zone ==
=== Group A ===
Pos	Team	Pld	W	D	L	GF	GA	GD	Pts	Qualification
1	Jammu and Kashmir	3	2	1	0	6	1	+5	7	Advance to Final Round
2	Delhi	3	2	1	0	3	1	+2	7	
3	Chandigarh	3	1	0	2	2	6	−4	3	
4	Uttar Pradesh	3	0	0	3	2	5	−3	0	

Rules for classification: 1) points; 2) goal difference; 3) goals scored; 4) head-to-head result.

6 February 2016	Jammu and Kashmir	1–0	Uttar Pradesh	GGM Science College, Jammu
	Gautam Meher 70'

6 February 2016	Chandigarh	0–1	Delhi	GGM Science College, Jammu
			Abhishek Rawat 36'

8 February 2016	Delhi	2–1	Uttar Pradesh	GGM Science College, Jammu
	Abhishek Rawat 25'; Shaheen John 80'		Mohammed Amir Khan 60'

8 February 2016	Chandigarh	0–4	Jammu and Kashmir	GGM Science College, Jammu
			Adnan Ayoub 25'; Farukh Choudhary 57', 70', 90+1'

10 February 2016	Uttar Pradesh	1–2	Chandigarh	GGM Science College, Jammu
	68' Vivek Singh		Navdeep Singh 35'; Neeraj Anand 46'

10 February 2016	Jammu and Kashmir	1–1	Delhi	GGM Science College, Jammu
	Gautam Mehra 61'		Vikas Rawat 53'

=== Group B ===
Pos	Team	Pld	W	D	L	GF	GA	GD	Pts	Qualification
1	Punjab	3	2	1	0	9	1	+8	7	Advance to Final Round
2	Haryana	3	2	1	0	3	1	+2	7	
3	Uttarakhand	3	1	0	2	3	4	−1	3	
4	Himachal Pradesh	3	0	0	3	0	9	−9	0	

Rules for classification: 1) points; 2) goal difference; 3) goals scored; 4) head-to-head result.

7 February 2016	Haryana	1–0	Uttarakhand	GGM Science College, Jammu
	Vikas 3'

7 February 2016	Punjab	5–0	Himachal Pradesh	GGM Science College, Jammu
	Pawan Kumar 15'; Ajay Singh 29', 54'; Taranjeet Singh 79'; Gurvinder Singh 90'

9 February 2016	Uttarakhand	0–3	Punjab	GGM Science College, Jammu
			Pawan Kumar Tiwari 17', 52'; Ajay Singh 48'

9 February 2016	Himachal Pradesh	0–1	Haryana	GGM Science College, Jammu
			Arvind 48'

11 February 2016	Himachal Pradesh	0–3	Uttarakhand	GGM Science College, Jammu
			Saurabh Rawat 14'; Vijaypal Singh Negi 34', 54'

11 February 2016	Punjab	1–1	Haryana	GGM Science College, Jammu
	Ajay Singh 79'		Arvind 90+1'

== South Zone ==
=== Group A ===
Team	Pld	W	D	L	GF	GA	GD	Pts
Tamil Nadu	2	1	1	0	4	1	+3	4
Kerala	2	1	1	0	3	1	+2	4
Telangana	2	0	0	2	0	5	-5	0

9 February 2016	Tamil Nadu	3–0	Telangana	Jawaharlal Nehru Stadium (Chennai)
	A Raegan 15', 88'; S Karthick 38'

11 February 2016	Telangana	0–2	Kerala	Jawaharlal Nehru Stadium (Chennai)
			10' Firose; 45' Ceasan

13 February 2016	Kerala	1–1	Tamil Nadu	Jawaharlal Nehru Stadium (Chennai)
	Askhar 45'		57' A Raegan

=== Group B ===
Team	Pld	W	D	L	GF	GA	GD	Pts
Services	3	3	0	0	16	2	+14	9
Karnataka	3	2	0	1	8	4	+4	6
Andhra Pradesh	3	1	0	2	5	4	+1	3
Pondicherry	3	0	0	3	1	20	-19	0

10 February 2016	Services	12–0	Pondicherry	Jawaharlal Nehru Stadium (Chennai)
	Vivek Kumar 13', 45'; Arjun Tudu 15', 41', 49', 77', 80'; Rojen Meitei 27'; P. Jain 72', 90+2'; P.M. Brito 83'; Antony Chetri 85'	Report

10 February 2016	Karnataka	2–1	Andhra Pradesh	Jawaharlal Nehru Stadium (Chennai)
	S. Karthik 35', 78'	Report	S. Sai Varun 85'

12 February 2016	Pondicherry	0–4	Karnataka	Jawaharlal Nehru Stadium (Chennai)
			28', 36' Anto Xavier; 40' (o.g.) S. Suman; 90+4' A. Don Bosco

12 February 2016	Andhra Pradesh	0–1	Services	Jawaharlal Nehru Stadium (Chennai)
			2' Arjun Tudu

14 February 2016	Pondicherry	1–4	Andhra Pradesh	Jawaharlal Nehru Stadium (Chennai)
	48' Sugumaran		4', 25' Mujeeb; 18' Santosh; 27' Niroshan Mani

14 February 2016	Services	3–2	Karnataka	Jawaharlal Nehru Stadium (Chennai)
	Vivek Kumar 8', 60'; Francis 74'		Anto Xavier 45' (pen.), 83' (pen.)

== West Zone ==
Team	Pld	W	D	L	GF	GA	GD	Pts
Goa	4	4	0	0	20	2	+18	12
Maharashtra	4	3	0	1	24	4	+20	9
Gujarat	4	2	0	2	12	11	-3	6
Madhya Pradesh	4	1	0	3	4	11	-7	3
Daman & Diu	4	0	0	4	1	31	-30	0

9 February 2016	Gujarat	0–6	Goa	Fatorda Stadium, Margao
			12', 58' Agnelo Colaco; 43' Francis Fernandes; 45' Peter Carvalho; 85', 90+1' Semson Fernandes

10 February 2016	Madhya Pradesh	3–0	Daman & Diu	Tilak Maidan Stadium, Vasco
	O.M. Prakash 12'; Aakash Ahir 23'; Akar Dhanu 90+1'

11 February 2016	Gujarat	2–6	Maharashtra	Tilak Maidan Stadium, Vasco
	Aamir Khan Pathan 66'; Mandeep Singh Barad 78'		21' Raynier Fernandes; 22' Mervin Stephen; 36', 45+3' Abhishek Ambedkar; Shahbaz Pathan 45+2', 76'

12 February 2016	Daman & Diu	1–11	Goa	Tilak Maidan Stadium, Vasco
	Prathamesh Powale 34'		16' Agnelo Colaco; 20', 22' Francis Fernandes; 31', 66', 68', 80' Beevan D'mello; 48', 58' Nickson Castana; 72' (o.g.) Priyesh Parkar

13 February 2016	Maharashtra	8–0	Madhya Pradesh	Tilak Maidan Stadium, Vasco
	Raynier Fernandes 6'; Mervin Stephen 39', 71'; Shrikant Veeramalu 62', 83'; Mohammed Pathan 68', 70'; Aaron D'Costa 75'

14 February 2016	Gujarat	8–0	Daman & Diu	Tilak Maidan Stadium, Vasco
	Pavan Ramanuj 14'; Pathan Sadat 16'; Irfan 45', 51'; Akshay Mall 71', 77'; Pavan 85'; Mayank Sailor 88'

15 February 2016	Madhya Pradesh	0–1	Goa	Tilak Maidan Stadium, Vasco
			8' Agnelo Colaco

16 February 2016	Maharashtra	9–0	Daman & Diu	Tilak Maidan Stadium, Vasco
	Mervin Stephen 10', 23', 63'; Abhishek Ambedkar 26'; Wayne Vaz 40'; Shrikant Veeramallu 50'; Harold Fernandes 70', 75'; Raynier Fernandes 89'

17 February 2016	Gujarat	2–1	Madhya Pradesh	Tilak Maidan Stadium, Vasco
	Irfan Abbas 37', 74'		90+1' Balram Ujwal

18 February 2016	Goa	4–1	Maharashtra	Tilak Maidan Stadium, Vasco
	Samson Fernandes 46'; Angelo Colaco 71'; Mario Mascarenhas 82'; Milagres Gonsalves 90+3'		87' Vijith Shetty

== East Zone ==
=== Group A ===
Team	Pld	W	D	L	GF	GA	GD	Pts
West Bengal	2	2	0	0	5	1	+4	6
Orissa	2	1	0	1	2	4	-2	3
Sikkim	2	0	0	2	2	4	-2	0

8 February 2016	West Bengal	2–1	Sikkim	Kalyani Stadium, Kalyani
	Babun Das 81'; Naro Hari Shrestha 89'		80' Bir Bahadur Pradhan

10 February 2016	Sikkim	1–2	Orissa	Kalyani Stadium, Kalyani
	55'		1' Arjun Nayak; 36' Pankaj Sona

12 February 2016	West Bengal	3–0	Orissa	Kalyani Stadium, Kalyani
	Mumtaz Akhtar 69' (pen.); Dipendu Dowary 77'; Naro Hari Shreshta 90+2'

=== Group B ===
Team	Pld	W	D	L	GF	GA	GD	Pts
Railways	3	2	1	0	4	0	+4	7
Jharkhand	3	2	1	0	5	3	+2	7
Bihar	3	1	0	2	4	5	-1	3
Chhattisgarh	3	0	0	3	2	5	-3	0

9 February 2016	Railways	1–0	Chhattisgarh	Kalyani Stadium, Kalyani
	Rajib Boro

9 February 2016	Bihar	2–3	Jharkhand	Kalyani Stadium, Kalyani

11 February 2016	Railways	3–0	Bihar	Kalyani Stadium, Kalyani
	Jilendra Brahma; Anil Kisku; P.C. Riju

11 February 2016	Chhattisgarh	1–2	Jharkhand	Kalyani Stadium, Kalyani

13 February 2016	Chhattisgarh	1–2	Bihar	Kalyani Stadium, Kalyani

13 February 2016	Jharkhand	0–0	Railways	Kalyani Stadium, Kalyani

== North East Zone ==
=== Group A ===
Pos	Team	Pld	W	D	L	GF	GA	GD	Pts	Qualification
1	Mizoram	2	1	1	0	1	0	+1	4	Advance to Final Round
2	Manipur	2	0	1	1	0	1	−1	1	

Updated to match(es) played on 19 February 2016. Source:
Rules for classification: 1) points; 2) goal difference; 3) goals scored; 4) head-to-head result.

19 February 2016	Manipur	0–0	Mizoram	Lammual Stadium, Aizawl

21 February 2016	Mizoram	1–0	Manipur	Lammual Stadium, Aizawl
	Malsawmfela 35'

=== Group B ===
Pos	Team	Pld	W	D	L	GF	GA	GD	Pts	Qualification
1	Assam	3	3	0	0	5	0	+5	9	Advance to Final Round
2	Meghalaya	3	2	0	1	8	1	+7	6	
3	Nagaland	3	0	1	2	0	6	−6	1	
4	Tripura	3	0	1	2	0	6	−6	1	

Updated to match(es) played on 23 February 2016. Source:
Rules for classification: 1) points; 2) goal difference; 3) goals scored; 4) head-to-head result.

18 February 2016	Assam	2–0	Nagaland	Lammual Stadium, Aizawl
	Sibra Nazary 60'; Rahul Das 75'

18 February 2016	Meghalaya	4–0	Tripura	Lammual Stadium, Aizawl
	Vinicil Darlong 50'; Teiborlang Siangshai 68' Bansharai Sun 74' Samson Songrum 90+2'

20 February 2016	Tripura	0–2	Assam	Lammual Stadium, Aizawl
			Sibra Narzary; Jessy Vanlalmuana

20 February 2016	Nagaland	0–4	Meghalaya	Lammual Stadium, Aizawl

23 February 2016	Assam	1–0	Meghalaya	Lammual Stadium, Aizawl
	Nabin Rabha 7'

23 February 2016	Nagaland	0–0	Tripura	Lammual Stadium, Aizawl
