= 2022–23 Santosh Trophy =

Senior Men's National Football Championship

Tournament details
- Country: India
- Venue(s): India (Group stage & Final round); Saudi Arabia (Knockouts)
- Dates: Group stage: 23 December 2022 – 31 January 2023; Final round: 10 – 20 February 2023; Knockouts: 1 – 4 March 2023
- Teams: 36

Final positions
- Champions: Karnataka (5th title)
- Runners-up: Meghalaya

Tournament statistics
- Matches played: 120
- Goals scored: 416 (3.47 per match)
- Top goal scorer(s): Naro Hari Shrestha (West Bengal); Nijo Joseph (Kerala) (9 goals)

Awards
- Best player: Robin Yadav (Karnataka)
- Best goalkeeper: Rajat Paul Lyngdoh (Meghalaya)
- All statistics correct as of 19 February 2023.

The 2022–23 Santosh Trophy was the 76th edition of the Santosh Trophy, the premier competition in India for senior men's football teams representing their respective states/union territories and government institutions.

Contrary to the recent seasons, this edition onwards the AIFF adopted a new format for the tournament that saw the removal of the qualification stage, thereby allowing all the state teams to participate in the group stage. This move taken in a way for promoting the sport in every region of the country. On 6 October 2022, the AIFF signed a MoU with the SAFF, which included an agreement to host the semi-finals, the 3rd place decider & the final in Riyadh, Saudi Arabia.

== Group stage ==
The group stage was contested by 36 teams representing the states and the union territories of India, wherein the teams were drawn into six groups. The six group winners, along with three best runner-up teams qualified for the final round along with Railways, Services and the host of the round.

=== Group I ===
Pos	Team	Pld	W	D	L	GF	GA	GD	Pts	Qualification	DL	KA	GJ	UT	TR	LA
1	Delhi (H)	5	4	1	0	14	1	+13	13	Final round	—	—	4–0	2–1	—	—
2	Karnataka	5	4	0	1	21	5	+16	12	Final round	0–1	—	—	—	10–0	—
3	Gujarat	5	3	0	2	12	10	+2	9		—	1–5	—	3–1	—	—
4	Uttarakhand	5	1	1	3	6	10	−4	4		—	1–3	—	—	1–0	—
5	Tripura	5	1	1	3	2	18	−16	4		0–0	—	0–6	—	—	—
6	Ladakh	5	0	1	4	5	16	−11	1		0–7	2–3	0–2	2–2	1–2	—

Source: AIFF
Rules for classification: 1) points; 2) head-to-head points; 3) head-to-head goal difference; 4) goal difference; 5) number of goals scored; 6) drawing of lots
(H) Hosts

=== Group II ===
Pos	Team	Pld	W	D	L	GF	GA	GD	Pts	Qualification	KL	MZ	JK	BR	RJ	AP
1	Kerala (H)	5	5	0	0	24	2	+22	15	Final round	—	—	3–0	—	—	5–0
2	Mizoram	5	4	0	1	14	8	+6	12		1–5	—	—	—	4–0	—
3	Jammu and Kashmir	5	2	1	2	8	8	0	7		—	2–3	—	—	0–0	—
4	Bihar	5	1	1	3	6	10	−4	4		1–4	1–3	0–2	—	3–0	1–1
5	Rajasthan	5	1	1	3	1	14	−13	4		0–7	—	—	—	—	1–0
6	Andhra Pradesh	5	0	1	4	3	14	−11	1		—	0–3	2–4	—	—	—

Source: AIFF
Rules for classification: 1) points; 2) head-to-head points; 3) head-to-head goal difference; 4) goal difference; 5) number of goals scored; 6) drawing of lots
(H) Hosts

=== Group III ===
Pos	Team	Pld	W	D	L	GF	GA	GD	Pts	Qualification	GA	NL	AS	UP	AR	TN
1	Goa	5	3	2	0	8	3	+5	11	Final round	—	0–0	—	—	2–1	—
2	Nagaland	5	3	2	0	6	2	+4	11		—	—	3–1	—	—	1–0
3	Assam (H)	5	3	0	2	12	6	+6	9		0–1	—	—	—	4–1	—
4	Uttar Pradesh	5	2	1	2	6	6	0	7		2–2	0–1	0–2	—	2–0	2–1
5	Arunachal Pradesh	5	1	1	3	5	10	−5	4		—	1–1	—	—	—	2–1
6	Tamil Nadu	5	0	0	5	3	13	−10	0		0–3	—	1–5	—	—	—

Source: AIFF
Rules for classification: 1) points; 2) head-to-head points; 3) head-to-head goal difference; 4) goal difference; 5) number of goals scored; 6) drawing of lots
(H) Hosts

=== Group IV ===
Pos	Team	Pld	W	D	L	GF	GA	GD	Pts	Qualification	WB	MH	HR	CT	MP	DH
1	West Bengal	5	5	0	0	17	1	+16	15	Final round	—	—	—	2–0	5–0	—
2	Maharashtra (H)	5	4	0	1	13	3	+10	12	Final round	1–2	—	3–1	—	—	—
3	Haryana	5	3	0	2	9	8	+1	9		0–3	—	—	—	2–1	—
4	Chhattisgarh	5	1	1	3	5	7	−2	4		—	0–1	1–2	—	—	—
5	Madhya Pradesh	5	1	1	3	5	13	−8	4		—	0–4	—	2–2	—	—
6	Dadra and Nagar Haveli and Daman and Diu	5	0	0	5	0	17	−17	0		0–5	0–4	0–4	0–2	0–2	—

Source: AIFF
Rules for classification: 1) points; 2) head-to-head points; 3) head-to-head goal difference; 4) goal difference; 5) number of goals scored; 6) drawing of lots
(H) Hosts

=== Group V ===
Pos	Team	Pld	W	D	L	GF	GA	GD	Pts	Qualification	ML	OD	SK	TG	PY	AN
1	Meghalaya	5	3	2	0	17	2	+15	11	Final round	—	2–2	0–0	1–0	—	—
2	Odisha (H)	5	3	1	1	17	3	+14	10	Final round	—	—	3–0	—	5–0	7–0
3	Sikkim	5	3	1	1	8	5	+3	10		—	—	—	3–0	2–1	—
4	Telangana	5	3	0	2	11	5	+6	9		—	1–0	—	—	5–1	—
5	Pondicherry	5	0	1	4	3	18	−15	1		0–5	—	—	—	—	1–1
6	Andaman and Nicobar	5	0	1	4	2	25	−23	1		0–9	—	1–3	0–5	—	—

Source: AIFF
Rules for classification: 1) points; 2) head-to-head points; 3) head-to-head goal difference; 4) goal difference; 5) number of goals scored; 6) drawing of lots
(H) Hosts

=== Group VI ===
Pos	Team	Pld	W	D	L	GF	GA	GD	Pts	Qualification	PB	MN	CH	JH	LD	HP
1	Punjab	5	4	1	0	11	1	+10	13	Final round	—	—	1–1	—	—	5–0
2	Manipur (H)	5	4	0	1	16	6	+10	12	Final round	0–1	—	—	5–1	—	—
3	Chandigarh	5	2	1	2	10	6	+4	7		—	1–3	—	—	—	5–0
4	Jharkhand	5	2	0	3	6	11	−5	6		0–1	—	1–0	—	—	—
5	Lakshadweep	5	1	0	4	7	13	−6	3		0–3	1–3	1–3	4–2	—	1–2
6	Himachal Pradesh	5	1	0	4	5	18	−13	3		—	2–5	—	2–1	—	—

Source: AIFF
Rules for classification: 1) points; 2) head-to-head points; 3) head-to-head goal difference; 4) goal difference; 5) number of goals scored; 6) drawing of lots
(H) Hosts

=== Ranking of runner-up teams ===
Pos	Grp	Team	Pld	W	D	L	GF	GA	GD	Pts	Qualification
1	I	Karnataka	5	4	0	1	21	5	+16	12	Final round
2	VI	Manipur	5	4	0	1	16	6	+10	12	Final round
3	IV	Maharashtra	5	4	0	1	13	3	+10	12	Final round
4	II	Mizoram	5	4	0	1	14	8	+6	12	
5	III	Nagaland	5	3	2	0	6	2	+4	11	
6	V	Odisha (Note: Odisha directly qualified for the Final round after being declared as the host of the round.)	5	3	1	1	17	3	+14	10	Final round

Source: AIFF

== Draw ==
The official draw for the 76th edition of Santosh Trophy was held on 19 January 2023 at the AIFF headquarters- the Football House, in New Delhi with AIFF Secretary General Dr. Shaji Prabhakaran assisting in the process. Nine teams who came through the qualifiers along with Services, Railways and the host of the final round - Odisha, were drawn into two groups of six each for the round beginning from 10 February. The host venue of the event was announced to be Bhubaneswar.

== Final round ==
=== Group A ===
Pos	Team	Pld	W	D	L	GF	GA	GD	Pts	Qualification	PB	KA	KL	MH	OD	GA
1	Punjab	5	3	2	0	12	8	+4	11	Semi-finals	—	—	—	4–3	—	3–1
2	Karnataka	5	2	3	0	10	7	+3	9	Semi-finals	2–2	—	—	—	2–2	2–0
3	Kerala	5	2	2	1	9	8	+1	8		1–1	0–1	—	4–4	—	—
4	Maharashtra	5	1	3	1	13	12	+1	6		—	3–3	—	—	1–1	—
5	Odisha (H)	5	1	2	2	8	7	+1	5		1–2	—	0–1	—	—	—
6	Goa	5	0	0	5	4	14	−10	0		—	—	2–3	0–2	1–4	—

Source: AIFF
Rules for classification: 1) points; 2) head-to-head points; 3) head-to-head goal difference; 4) goal difference; 5) number of goals scored; 6) drawing of lots
(H) Hosts
10 February 2023
09:00

Goa	2–3	Kerala
Mahammed Faheez 60', 73'	Report	Nijo Gilbert 27'; Riswanali Edakkavil 57'; Asif O M 90+1'

Capital Football Arena, Bhubaneswar
10 February 2023
15:00

Maharashtra	1–1	Odisha
Armash Nasir Ansari 57'	Report	Chandra Muduli 83'

Capital Football Arena, Bhubaneswar
10 February 2023
15:00

Punjab	2–2	Karnataka
Kamaldeep 65'; Bipul Kala 69'	Report	Kamalesh P 82'; Robin Yadav 90+3'

OFA 7th Battalion Ground, Bhubaneswar

12 February 2023
09:00

Kerala	0–1	Karnataka
	Report	Abhishekh Shankar Powar 20'

OFA 7th Battalion Ground, Bhubaneswar
12 February 2023
15:00

Punjab	4–3	Maharashtra
Kamaldeep 21'; Jaginder Singh 53'; Rohit Sheikh 71'; Parmjit Singh 90+1'	Report	Armash Nasir Ansari 39'; Himanshu Patil 65'; Pavan Vijay Mali 69'

OFA 7th Battalion Ground, Bhubaneswar
12 February 2023
15:00

Goa	1–4	Odisha
Mahammed Faheez 45+1' (pen.)	Report	Bikash Kumar Sahoo 11'; Chandra Mohan Murmu 28'; Rahul Mukhi 79'; Anand Oram 90+6'

Kalinga Stadium, Bhubaneswar

14 February 2023
09:00

Karnataka	2–0	Goa
Jacob John Kattookaren 33'; Abhishekh Shankar Powar 50'	Report

Capital Football Arena, Bhubaneswar
14 February 2023
15:00

Odisha	1–2	Punjab
Anand Oram 90+3'	Report	Jang Bahadur Singh 75'; Kamaldeep 82'

Capital Football Arena, Bhubaneswar
14 February 2023
15:00

Kerala	4–4	Maharashtra
Vishak Mohanan 38'; Nijo Gilbert 66'; Arjun V 70'; John Paul Jose 77'	Report	Sufiyan Shaikh 17'; Himanshu Patil 20'; Sumit Rajendrasingh Bhandari 34'; Tejas Raut 42'

Kalinga Stadium, Bhubaneswar

17 February 2023
09:00

Maharashtra	3–3	Karnataka
Johnson Joseph Mathews 14'; Armash Nasir Ansari 55', 60'	Report	Robin Yadav 45+4'; Ankith P 61'; Shajan Franklin 90+11'

OFA 7th Battalion Ground, Bhubaneswar
17 February 2023
15:00

Odisha	0–1	Kerala
	Report	Nijo Gilbert 16'

Kalinga Stadium, Bhubaneswar
17 February 2023
15:00

Punjab	3–1	Goa
Nickson Castanha 20' (o.g.); Rohit Sheikh 74', 80'	Report	Clencio Pinto 88'

OFA 7th Battalion Ground, Bhubaneswar

19 February 2023
09:00

Goa	0–2	Maharashtra
	Report	Himanshu Patil 5', 89'

Capital Football Arena, Bhubaneswar
19 February 2023
15:00

Karnataka	2–2	Odisha
M Sunil Kumar 17'; Shajan Franklin 50'	Report	Prabin Tigga 21'; Chandra Muduli 35'

Capital Football Arena, Bhubaneswar
19 February 2023
15:00

Kerala	1–1	Punjab
Vishak Mohanan 24'	Report	Rohit Sheikh 34'

OFA 7th Battalion Ground, Bhubaneswar

=== Group B ===
Pos	Team	Pld	W	D	L	GF	GA	GD	Pts	Qualification	SV	ML	RL	MN	DL	WB
1	Services	5	4	1	0	12	2	+10	13	Semi-finals	—	—	4–0	—	1–1	—
2	Meghalaya	5	3	1	1	8	4	+4	10	Semi-finals	0–2	—	—	1–0	5–1	—
3	Railways	5	2	1	2	3	8	−5	7		—	0–0	—	—	—	1–0
4	Manipur	5	2	0	3	8	8	0	6		0–3	—	4–1	—	—	—
5	Delhi	5	1	2	2	6	9	−3	5		—	—	0–1	2–0	—	2–2
6	West Bengal	5	0	1	4	5	11	−6	1		1–2	1–2	—	1–4	—	—

Source: AIFF
Rules for classification: 1) points; 2) head-to-head points; 3) head-to-head goal difference; 4) goal difference; 5) number of goals scored; 6) drawing of lots
11 February 2023
09:00

Delhi	2–2	West Bengal
Neeraj Bhandari 8'; Gaurav Rawat 72'	Report	Naro Hari Shrestha 50', 61'

OFA 7th Battalion Ground, Bhubaneswar
11 February 2023
15:00

Manipur	4–1	Railways
Ngangbam Naocha Singh 56', 69', 73'; Yami Longvah 90+2'	Report	Ramakrishnan R 72'

OFA 7th Battalion Ground, Bhubaneswar
11 February 2023
15:00

Meghalaya	0–2	Services
	Report	Sunil B 28'; Moirangthem Ronaldo Singh 45+1'

Capital Football Arena, Bhubaneswar

13 February 2023
09:00

West Bengal	1–2	Services
Naro Hari Shrestha 14'	Report	P Christopher Kamei 41'; Bikash Thapa 82'

Capital Football Arena, Bhubaneswar
13 February 2023
15:00

Meghalaya	1–0	Manipur
Brolington Warlarpih 62'	Report

Capital Football Arena, Bhubaneswar
13 February 2023
15:00

Delhi	0–1	Railways
	Report	Nuruddin 45+3'

Kalinga Stadium, Bhubaneswar

15 February 2023
09:00

Services	1–1	Delhi
P Christopher Kamei 21'	Report	Shafeel PP 90+3' (o.g.)

OFA 7th Battalion Ground, Bhubaneswar
15 February 2023
15:00

Railways	0–0	Meghalaya
	Report

OFA 7th Battalion Ground, Bhubaneswar
15 February 2023
19:30

West Bengal	1–4	Manipur
Souvik Kar 54'	Report	Pangambam Naoba Meitei 11'; Singam Subash Singh 37'; Biswajit Hembrom 81' (o.g.); Ngangbam Naocha Singh 90+4'

Kalinga Stadium, Bhubaneswar

18 February 2023
09:00

Manipur	0–3	Services
	Report	Liton Shil 5'; Sunil B 14'; Bikash Thapa 16'

OFA 7th Battalion Ground, Bhubaneswar
18 February 2023
15:00

Railways	1–0	West Bengal
Biswajit Hembrom 85' (o.g.)	Report

OFA 7th Battalion Ground, Bhubaneswar
18 February 2023
15:00

Meghalaya	5–1	Delhi
Donlad Diengdoh 17', 57'; Ronaldkydon Lyngdoh Nonglait 39', 90+7'; Everbrightson Sana Mylliempdah 90+4'	Report	Ajay Singh 90'

Capital Football Arena, Bhubaneswar

20 February 2023
09:00

Services	4–0	Railways
Oinam Gautam Singh 32', 49'; Adersh Mattummal 34', 65'	Report

Capital Football Arena, Bhubaneswar
20 February 2023
15:00

Delhi	2–0	Manipur
Ajay Singh 18', 45+1'	Report

Capital Football Arena, Bhubaneswar
20 February 2023
09:00

West Bengal	1–2	Meghalaya
Sougata Hansda 36'	Report	Allen Camper Lyngdoh Nongbri 44'; Nikelson Bina 45+3'

OFA 7th Battalion Ground, Bhubaneswar

== Knockout stage ==
=== Bracket ===
Semi-finals
1 March 2023 - Riyadh
Punjab	1
Meghalaya	2
1 March 2023 - Riyadh
Karnataka	3
Services	1

Final
4 March 2023 - Riyadh
Meghalaya	2
Karnataka	3
Third place
4 March 2023 - Riyadh
Punjab	0
Services	2

=== Semi-finals ===
1 March 2023
17:30 IST

Punjab	1–2	Meghalaya
Parmjit Singh 16'	Report	Figo Syndai 37'; Sheen Stevenson Sohktung 90+1'

King Fahd International Stadium

1 March 2023
21:00 IST

Services	1–3	Karnataka
Bikash Thapa 40'	Report	Robin Yadav 43'; Ankith P 45'; M Sunil Kumar 77'

King Fahd International Stadium

=== Third place ===
4 March 2023
18:00 IST

Punjab	0–2	Services
	Report	Shafeel Pp 7'; P Christopher Kamei 60'

King Fahd International Stadium

=== Final ===
4 March 2023
21:00 IST

Meghalaya	2–3	Karnataka
Brolington Warlarpih 9' (pen.); Sheen Stevenson Sohktung 60'	Report	M Sunil Kumar 2'; Bekey Oram 19'; Robin Yadav 44'

King Fahd International Stadium, Riyadh

== Statistics ==
Rank	Player	Team	Goal(s)
1	Naro Hari Shrestha	West Bengal	9
1	Nijo Gilbert	Kerala	9
3	Robin Yadav	Karnataka	6
3	Arif Shaikh	Maharashtra	6
3	Ajay Singh	Delhi	6
Source: AIFF

== Awards ==
Award	Player	Team
Top Scorer of the Championship	Naro Hari Shrestha	West Bengal
Top Scorer of the Championship	Nijo Gilbert	Kerala
Best Goalkeeper of the Championship	Rajat Paul Lyngdoh	Meghalaya
Hero of the Championship	Robin Yadav	Karnataka

== See also ==
- 2023 National Beach Soccer Championship
- 2022–23 Futsal Club Championship
