= 1957–58 Santosh Trophy =

Tournament details
- Country: India
- Dates: February 2, 1958 -

Final positions
- Champions: Hyderabad (2nd title)
- Runners-up: Bombay
- 70 minute matches

The 1957–58 Santosh Trophy was the 14th edition of the Santosh Trophy, the main State competition for football in India. It was held in 1958 in Hyderabad, Andhra Pradesh. Hyderabad retained the title beating Bombay 3–1 in the final.
