= Ladakh football team =

Ladakh
- Full name: Ladakh football team
- Founded: 2022; 3 years ago
- Ground: Spituk Football Stadium
- Owner: Ladakh Football Association
- Head coach: Ajaz Ahmad Bhat
- League: Santosh Trophy
- 2024–25: Group stage
Home colours	Away colours

The Ladakh football team is an Indian football team representing Ladakh in Indian state football competitions, including the Santosh Trophy. It is governed by the Ladakh Football Association, affiliated to the AIFF. The team made its senior national debut in the 2022–23 Santosh Trophy edition.

== Squad ==
The following 22 players were called up for the 2022–23 Santosh Trophy.

Note: Flags indicate national team as defined under FIFA eligibility rules; some limited exceptions apply. Players may hold more than one non-FIFA nationality.

No.	Pos.	Nation	Player
1	GK	IND	Tsewang Norbu
2	DF	IND	Stanzin Tsepak
3	DF	IND	Stanzin Wangdan
4	DF	IND	Skarma Lotus Tarako
14	DF	IND	Jigmet Namgyal
6	MF	IND	Delex Namgyal
7	MF	IND	Jigmet Stanzin
8	MF	IND	Stanzin Jigmet
11	MF	IND	Mohmad Ilyas
9	FW	IND	Chinba Tharchin
10	FW	IND	Tsering Dorjey

No.	Pos.	Nation	Player
5	DF	IND	Tsering Namgial
12	MF	IND	Arip Hussain
13	DF	IND	Eshay Tobgyal
15	FW	IND	Stanzin Gilik
—		IND	Jigmet Tsetan
17	DF	IND	Mohd Mussa Abbasi
—		IND	Sikander Ali
19	DF	IND	Tsewang Rahula
20	MF	IND	Tsewang Sangdup
21	MF	IND	Wasim
22	GK	IND	Tsewang Gyatso

== Statistics and records ==
=== Season-by-season ===
As of 19 February 2023

Season	Santosh Trophy						
Season	Pld	W	D	L	GF	GA	Pos
2022–23	5	0	1	4	5	16	Group Stage
