= Xavier Vijay Kumar =

Indian footballer

Personal information
- Full name: Xavier Vijay Kumar
- Date of birth: 25 November 1978 (age 47)
- Place of birth: Karnataka, India
- Position: Striker

Team information
- Current team: Students Union

Senior career*
Years	Team	Apps	(Gls)
1998–2011	HAL		
2011–2013	Churchill Brothers	3	(0)
2014–	Students Union		

International career
2006	India	2	(0)
- * Club domestic league appearances and goals

Xavier Vijay Kumar (born 25 November 1978) is an Indian former footballer who is currently a football coach South United football club. Before being a coach at South United, he was a coach at Boca Juniors India. He most recently played for Students Union football club in the Banglaore Super Division. He spent 13 years playing for HAL following which he had a two-year stint with Churchill Brothers before joining Students Union.
