= Telangana football team =

Indian football team

Telangana
- Full name: Telangana football team
- Ground: G. M. C. Balayogi Athletic Stadium
- Capacity: 30,000
- Owner: Telangana Football Association
- Head coach: Shabbir Ali
- League: Santosh Trophy
- 2024–25: Final round
Home colours	Away colours

The Telangana football team is an Indian football team representing Telangana in Indian state football competitions including the Santosh Trophy.

The team was first created in 2014. They debuted during the 2015–16 Santosh Trophy qualification season.

== See also ==
- Telangana Football Association
