= Haryana football team =

Haryana
- Full name: Haryana football team
- Ground: Various
- Owner: Haryana Football Association
- Head coach: Shakti Singh
- League: Santosh Trophy
- 2024–25: Group stage
| Home colours | Away colours |

The Haryana football team is a football team of India representing Haryana in Indian state football competitions including the Santosh Trophy.

== Squad ==
The following 22 players were called for the 2023–24 Santosh Trophy.

Note: Flags indicate national team as defined under FIFA eligibility rules; some limited exceptions apply. Players may hold more than one non-FIFA nationality.

| No. | Pos. | Nation | Player |
|---|---|---|---|
| 1 | GK | IND | Dinesh |
| 2 | DF | IND | Vikramaditya |
| 3 | DF | IND | Amit |
| 4 | DF | IND | Dheeraj |
| 5 | DF | IND | Rohit |
| 6 | MF | IND | Ajay |
| 7 | MF | IND | Sushil |
| 8 | MF | IND | Mukesh Kumar |
| 9 | FW | IND | Ankit |
| 10 | MF | IND | Sahil Mahlawat |
| 11 | FW | IND | Hitesh Kadian |

| No. | Pos. | Nation | Player |
|---|---|---|---|
| 12 | MF | IND | Harsh Bisla |
| 13 | DF | IND | Suraj Vijay |
| 14 | DF | IND | Sonu |
| 15 | DF | IND | Deepak |
| 16 | MF | IND | Mayank Deshwal |
| 18 | MF | IND | Lalit Kumar |
| 21 | GK | IND | Ravi Kumar |
| — | FW | IND | Sumit |
| — | MF | IND | Onkar |
| — | FW | IND | Naman Juyal |
| — | | IND | Vishal Singh |

== Honours ==
=== State (youth) ===
- B.C. Roy Trophy
  - Winners (1): 2007–08
- M. Dutta Ray Trophy
  - Runners-up (1): 2010

== Statistics and records ==
=== Season-by-season ===
As of 31 December 2024

Champions Runners-up Third place

| Season | Santosh Trophy | | | | | | | Qualifiers | | | | | |
| Season | Pld | W | D | L | GF | GA | Pos | Pld | W | D | L | GF | GA |
|---|---|---|---|---|---|---|---|---|---|---|---|---|---|
| 2001–02 | Did not qualify | | | | | | Qualifying Round | 2 | 1 | 0 | 1 | 7 | 4 |
| 2002–03 | Did not qualify | | | | | | Qualifying Round | 3 | 0 | 0 | 3 | 1 | 5 |
| 2004–05 | Did not qualify | | | | | | Qualifying Round | 3 | 2 | 0 | 1 | 6 | 3 |
| 2005–06 | Did not qualify | | | | | | Qualifying Round | 2 | 0 | 1 | 1 | 1 | 2 |
| 2006–07 | 3 | 0 | 2 | 1 | 2 | 3 | Group Stage | 3 | 2 | 1 | 0 | 4 | 0 |
| 2007–08 | 1 | 0 | 0 | 1 | 1 | 2 | Pre Quarter | 2 | 1 | 1 | 0 | 3 | 1 |
| 2008–09 | 1 | 0 | 0 | 1 | 0 | 5 | Pre Quarter | 2 | 2 | 0 | 0 | 9 | 0 |
| 2009–10 | Did not qualify | | | | | | Qualifying Round | 2 | 0 | 0 | 2 | 1 | 9 |
| 2010–11 | Did not qualify | | | | | | Qualifying Round | 3 | 1 | 0 | 2 | 4 | 8 |
| 2011–12 | 3 | 1 | 1 | 1 | 7 | 6 | Group Stage | 3 | 3 | 0 | 0 | 10 | 2 |
| 2012–13 | 3 | 1 | 1 | 1 | 5 | 4 | Group Stage | Automatically in the group stage Proper | | | | | |
| 2013–14 | Did not qualify | | | | | | Qualifying Round | 3 | 1 | 2 | 0 | 4 | 3 |
| 2014–15 | Did not qualify | | | | | | Qualifying Round | 3 | 1 | 2 | 0 | 3 | 0 |
| 2015–16 | Did not qualify | | | | | | Qualifying Round | 3 | 2 | 1 | 0 | 3 | 1 |
| 2016–17 | Did not qualify | | | | | | Qualifying Round | 3 | 0 | 1 | 2 | 1 | 3 |
| 2017–18 | Did not qualify | | | | | | Qualifying Round | 3 | 1 | 1 | 1 | 4 | 3 |
| 2018–19 | Did not qualify | | | | | | Qualifying Round | 3 | 0 | 1 | 2 | 1 | 7 |
| 2021–22 | Did not qualify | | | | | | Qualifying Round | 3 | 1 | 0 | 2 | 6 | 6 |
| 2022–23 | 5 | 3 | 0 | 2 | 9 | 8 | Group Stage | NA | | | | | |
| 2023–24 | 5 | 0 | 1 | 4 | 0 | 6 | Group Stage | NA | | | | | |
| 2024–25 | 3 | 1 | 0 | 2 | 2 | 6 | Group Stage | NA | | | | | |
