= Andaman and Nicobar football team =

Andaman and Nicobar
- Full name: Andaman and Nicobar football team
- Ground: Netaji Stadium
- Owner: Andaman and Nicobar Football Association
- Head coach: Suman Ghoshal
- League: Santosh Trophy
- 2024–25: Group stage
Home colours	Away colours

The Andaman and Nicobar football team is an Indian football team representing Andaman and Nicobar Islands in Indian state football competitions including the Santosh Trophy.

== Current squad ==
The following 22 players were called for the 2022–23 Santosh Trophy.

Note: Flags indicate national team as defined under FIFA eligibility rules; some limited exceptions apply. Players may hold more than one non-FIFA nationality.

No.	Pos.	Nation	Player
1	GK	IND	Rohit Boro
4	DF	IND	Farhan Ahmed
12	DF	IND	N J Sansani
18	DF	IND	Altaf Mahir
22	DF	IND	Ayan Ekka
6	MF	IND	P Mohammad Sohail
10	MF	IND	Githin Raj
14	MF	IND	P Abdul Rishad
17	MF	IND	Anshif M
7	FW	IND	K Micah
16	FW	IND	Kv Mohd Basir

No.	Pos.	Nation	Player
—		IND	I Antony Richardson
3	DF	IND	M Weldon Luther
—		IND	Km Mohammed Asif
—		IND	Vipul Ohadar
9	FW	IND	N Ravi
11	FW	IND	Ankit Bilung
13	MF	IND	Ajish David
—		IND	Vikas Singh
—		IND	V Mohammed Suhail
—		IND	Arvind
—		IND	Hafeez Rahman

== Notable players ==
- Thomas Khusboo, India U19 (1985) and India U23 (1991)
- Herbert San
