= Arunachal Pradesh football team =

Arunachal Pradesh
- Full name: Arunachal Pradesh football team
- Ground: Various
- Owner: Arunachal Pradesh Football Association
- Head coach: Sangey Tsering
- League: Santosh Trophy
- 2024–25: Group stage
Home colours	Away colours

The Arunachal Pradesh football team is an Indian football team representing Arunachal Pradesh in the Indian state football competitions including the Santosh Trophy. Arunachal's sub-juniors team was runner up in the 2018 Hero Sub-Juniors Boys' National Championship and the 2019 Hero Sub Juniors Girls' National Championship. In the tournament, Tallo Ana from the Apatani community of Arunachal Pradesh was the top scorer with 15 goals in five matches.

== Squad ==
The following 20 players were called for the 2022–23 Santosh Trophy.

Note: Flags indicate national team as defined under FIFA eligibility rules; some limited exceptions apply. Players may hold more than one non-FIFA nationality.

No.	Pos.	Nation	Player
1	GK	IND	Jagom Loyi
3	DF	IND	Yachang Kani
5	DF	IND	Gemar Loya
6	DF	IND	Tai Bai
12	DF	IND	Akash Kino
18	DF	IND	Yura Tarung
8	MF	IND	Tame Agung
9	MF	IND	Tagru James
10	MF	IND	Tarh Dolu
14	MF	IND	Nabam Ropo
7	FW	IND	Tapi Hakhe

No.	Pos.	Nation	Player
2	DF	IND	Tania Raji
4	DF	IND	Geba Loya
—		IND	Charu Lalum
13	MF	IND	Baken Ete
—		IND	Koku Kutundu Linggi
16	MF	IND	Tsering Sherpa
17	MF	IND	Hage Gendha
19	DF	IND	Taba Heli
—		IND	Hage Tayo

== Honours ==
=== State (youth) ===
- Mir Iqbal Hussain Trophy
  - Runners-up (2): 2018–19, 2019–20
