= Nagaland football team =

Nagaland
- Full name: Nagaland football team
- Ground: Indira Gandhi Stadium, Kohima
- Capacity: 20,000
- Owner: Nagaland Football Association
- Head coach: Mughato Aye
- League: Santosh Trophy
- 2024–25: Group stage
Home colours	Away colours

The Nagaland football team is the football team of Nagaland, India. The team mainly competes in the Santosh Trophy and in the NE Dr. T. Ao Trophy, among other Indian state football competitions.

== Squad ==
The following 22 players were called for the 2022–23 Santosh Trophy.

Note: Flags indicate national team as defined under FIFA eligibility rules; some limited exceptions apply. Players may hold more than one non-FIFA nationality.

No.	Pos.	Nation	Player
1	GK	IND	Neithovilie Chalieu
4	DF	IND	Sanyem Konyak
5	DF	IND	Hemping L
6	DF	IND	Hekato Aye
12	DF	IND	Lironthung Lothe
7	MF	IND	Hoatinmang Thomsong
8	MF	IND	Sinenlo Kath
10	MF	IND	Kevisanyu Peseyie
15	MF	IND	Pursunep
21	MF	IND	Lalrou Reiyang
18	FW	IND	Haileuyibe Iranggau

No.	Pos.	Nation	Player
—		IND	Liang T Khiamniungan
3	DF	IND	Benrithung Humtsoe
9	FW	IND	Khiuwangbo Kaurinta
11	MF	IND	Kakhevi Assumi
—		IND	Yhoto Lohe
—		IND	Katoho Chishi
—		IND	Kuvezo Vero
—		IND	Ito
—		IND	Homuka Yeptho
—		IND	Visalie Mezhu
23	FW	IND	Toka A Achumi
