= Chhattisgarh football team =

Chhattisgarh
- Full name: Chhattisgarh football team
- Ground: Various
- Owner: Chhattisgarh Football Association
- Head coach: Santanu Ghosh
- League: Santosh Trophy
- 2024–25: Group stage
Home colours	Away colours

The Chhattisgarh football team is an Indian football team representing Chhattisgarh in Indian state football competitions including the Santosh Trophy.
