= Pondicherry football team =

Pondicherry
- Full name: Pondicherry football team
- Ground: Indira Gandhi Sports Stadium
- Owner: Pondicherry Football Association
- Head coach: Titus Lakshmanan Raman
- League: Santosh Trophy
- 2024–25: Group stage
Home colours	Away colours

The Pondicherry football team is an Indian football team representing Puducherry in Indian state football competitions including the Santosh Trophy. They have never won the trophy.

== Squad ==
The following 22 players were called for the 2022–23 Santosh Trophy.

Note: Flags indicate national team as defined under FIFA eligibility rules; some limited exceptions apply. Players may hold more than one non-FIFA nationality.

No.	Pos.	Nation	Player
1	GK	IND	Vignesh r
2	DF	IND	Abdul Rehan Q
15	DF	IND	Ajeesh Thadeus
20	DF	IND	L Tamilarasan
7	MF	IND	Asalam Amanulla
10	MF	IND	Lettin Joy Amaladasan
13	MF	IND	Ganesh B
18	MF	IND	Austin Jijo
19	MF	IND	Arunprasath
16	MF	IND	P Bharathkumar
17	FW	IND	Sunith Mon P S

No.	Pos.	Nation	Player
—		IND	Prabukumar Bharath
—		IND	R Milen
—		IND	Deepak S
—		IND	Thalirvendhan
—		IND	Beera George Mission
11	DF	IND	Rajesh Kanna G
12	MF	IND	Srinath
—		IND	Abinath
22	GK	IND	Nedumaran
—		IND	Srijayakumar
—		IND	Pranav Sankar Cj
