= Dadra and Nagar Haveli and Daman and Diu football team =

Football team representing UT of Dadra and Nagar Haveli and Daman and Diu

Dadra and Nagar Haveli and Daman and Diu
- Full name: Dadra and Nagar Haveli and Daman and Diu football team
- Founded: 2022; 3 years ago
- Owner: DNHDD FA
- Head coach: Prit Bharatkumar Bhatt
- League: Santosh Trophy
- 2024–25: Group stage
Home colours	Away colours

The Dadra and Nagar Haveli and Daman and Diu football team is an Indian football team representing the union territory of Dadra and Nagar Haveli and Daman and Diu in Indian state football competitions including the Santosh Trophy. The Dadra and Nagar Haveli and Daman and Diu football teams participated in the national competitions until they were merged in the 2022–23 Indian football season and made its senior national debut in the 2022–23 Santosh Trophy edition.

== Team ==
The following 22 players were called up prior to the 2022–23 Santosh Trophy.

Note: Flags indicate national team as defined under FIFA eligibility rules; some limited exceptions apply. Players may hold more than one non-FIFA nationality.

No.	Pos.	Nation	Player
1	GK	IND	Gnana Prakash S
19		IND	Ahammed Ziyad KA
20		IND	Mehul Mandu Gayakwad
3	DF	IND	Jay Nitesh Halpati
5	DF	IND	Vikram Yohan Mahala
7	DF	IND	Jitu Prabhu Gavit
10	DF	IND	Ambarish S
2	DF	IND	Shubham Santosh Salunke
4	DF	IND	Shohil Bagoan
6	MF	IND	Mohammed Shahamath KM
8	MF	IND	Vignesh Nadar

No.	Pos.	Nation	Player
9	FW	IND	Sachinkumar Dayarambhai (captain)
11	FW	IND	Savindhar Rameshkumar
13	GK	IND	Shivam Kumar
14	DF	IND	Vikram
15	FW	IND	Ragibuddin Saiyed
16	DF	IND	Gaurang Mistry
17	MF	IND	Dulfukhar Ali K
22	FW	IND	Sagar Chowdhary
12	FW	IND	Rahul Laxman Kharpadiya
18	FW	IND	Abdul Harsheek MA
21	FW	IND	Keyur Mangela
