= Gujarat football team =

Indian football team

Gujarat
- Full name: Gujarat football team
- Ground: EKA Arena
- Capacity: 20,000
- Owner: Gujarat State Football Association
- Head coach: Marcelino Aleixo Pereira
- League: Santosh Trophy
- 2024–25: Group stage
Home colours	Away colours

The Gujarat football team is an Indian football team representing Gujarat in Indian state football competitions including the Santosh Trophy. The team is currently governed by Gujarat State Football Association.

== Team ==
The following 22 players were called up prior to the 2022–23 Santosh Trophy Note: Flags indicate national team as defined under FIFA eligibility rules; some limited exceptions apply. Players may hold more than one non-FIFA nationality.

No.	Pos.	Nation	Player
1	GK	IND	Ajmal Eranjhikkal
—		IND	Saugat Shah K
—		IND	Harshil Parekh
4	DF	IND	Jenishsinh Rana
3	DF	IND	Brajesh Kumar Yadav
2	DF	IND	Anirudhsinh Thakor
8	DF	IND	Rutig Ahirrao
18	MF	IND	Aditya Jha
22	MF	IND	Mohmadmaruf Ismail Mulla
7		IND	Aman Shah
9	FW	IND	Moinuddin

No.	Pos.	Nation	Player
10		IND	Jay Kanani
11		IND	Parmar Dharmesh
—		IND	Darren Philip Job
—		IND	Musamiyan Syed
—		IND	Ramsingh Jayram Ratva
—	MF	IND	Rudra Chhetri
—	FW	IND	Vishal Rajkumar Dube
—	FW	IND	Kuldeepsinh Thakor
—		IND	Abhayrajsinh Bhupendrasinh Jadeja
6	MF	IND	Palash Barber
