= Tripura football team =

Tripura
- Full name: Tripura football team
- Ground: Swami Vivekananda Stadium
- Capacity: 8,000
- Owner: Tripura Football Association
- Head coach: Dinesh Kumar Pradhan
- League: Santosh Trophy
- 2024–25: Group stage
Home colours	Away colours

The Tripura football team is an Indian football team that represents Tripura in Indian state football competitions, including at the Santosh Trophy.

== Squad ==
The following 22 players were called for the 2022–23 Santosh Trophy.

Note: Flags indicate national team as defined under FIFA eligibility rules; some limited exceptions apply. Players may hold more than one non-FIFA nationality.

No.	Pos.	Nation	Player
1	GK	IND	Sandeep Rai
3	DF	IND	Rahul Khokhar
4	DF	IND	Kabir Mallick
5	DF	IND	Samarjit Debbarma
6	DF	IND	Sustha Hari Jamatia
17	DF	IND	Mangal Shingh Debbarma
8	MF	IND	Deep Samanta
14	MF	IND	Surajit Ghosh
18	MF	IND	Subhanil Ghosh
9	FW	IND	Ishmael Tamang
10	FW	IND	Bimal Reang

No.	Pos.	Nation	Player
2	DF	IND	Mani Tripura
—		IND	Hemant Debbarma
11	FW	IND	Stephen C Lalruatfela
—		IND	Poritosh Debbarma
—		IND	Joykishan Debbarma
—		IND	Sanjit Debbarma
—		IND	Avijit Sarkar
24	MF	IND	Paithak Jamatia
—		IND	Khaswrang Jamatia
26	DF	IND	Joykishan Ghashi
—		IND	Hartan Joy Tripura
