= Himachal Pradesh football team =

Himachal Pradesh
- Full name: Himachal Pradesh football team
- Ground: Various
- Owner: Himachal Pradesh Football Association
- Head coach: Amit Rana
- League: Santosh Trophy
- 2024–25: Group stage
Home colours	Away colours

The Himachal Pradesh football team is the representative football team for the northern Indian state of Himachal Pradesh. The team is governed by the Himachal Pradesh Football Association (HPFA), which is responsible for overseeing football activities and development in the region.

== History ==
The Himachal Pradesh Football Team was formed in 1971, with the aim of promoting and nurturing football talent within the state. Over the years, the team has participated in various regional and national tournaments, contributing to the growth of football in Himachal Pradesh.

== Achievements ==
The Himachal Pradesh football team represents Himachal Pradesh in Indian state football competitions, including the Santosh Trophy. However, they have struggled to make a significant impact in these competitions, failing to qualify for the final rounds of most Santosh Trophy editions.

The Himachal Pradesh Football Association is responsible for sending state teams for the Santosh Trophy and Senior Women’s National Football Championship. The association also organizes the Himachal Football League, which kicked off its inaugural season on November 25, 2020, with 10 teams competing for the maiden title.

While the team’s achievements at the national level have been limited, the development of the Himachal Football League indicates a commitment to nurturing local talent and promoting the sport within the state. This could potentially lead to greater success for the Himachal Pradesh football team in the future.

== Home ground ==
The Himachal Pradesh Football Team plays its home matches at Khad Football Ground, located in Una. The stadium serves as a hub for local football enthusiasts and provides a platform for players to showcase their skills.

== Participation in tournaments ==
The Himachal Pradesh football team has been actively participating in various tournaments. Here are some key points:

- Santosh Trophy: The team represents the state in the Santosh Trophy Tournament 23. However, they have had occasional successes and were mostly considered among the also-rans on the domestic circuit.
- Inter-District Championships: The Himachal Pradesh Football Association (HPFA) organizes inter-district championships.
- Inter-College Championships for Girls: The HPFA has conducted inter-college championships for girls. The Inter-college women’s championship was a significant achievement for them.
- AFC Grassroots Day Celebration: In May 2023, the HPFA organized the AFC Grassroots Day Celebration at Khad Football Stadium in Una. The event featured the participation of six schools in tournaments with separate categories for U-12 and U-16 boys.
- Grassroots Development: Following the ‘Vision 2047’ project of the AIFF, the HPFA has attached a lot of importance to grassroots development.

The HPFA has been making relentless efforts to raise the bar in Himachal football. They have been organizing tournaments, conducting license courses, celebrating grassroots day, and holding camps for junior boys and girls. These efforts have resulted in Himachal players getting opportunities to play outside the state. For instance, Vishal Kaith, who plays for Senior India, is originally from Himachal

== Notable players ==
The Himachal Pradesh football team has had several notable players over the years. Here are a few of them:

- Ranveer Singh
- Shashi Kumar
- Anil Dutta
- Mohit Rana
- Manoj Kumar
- Ganesh Mohan
- Kuldeep Mashi
- Dheeraj Sharma
- Kulbir Singh
- Chandan Kumar
- Vikrant Rana
- Ankit Kumar Rana
- Mohit Saini
- Sachin Kapoor
- Gopal
- Gurpal Singh
- Nitesh Sharma
- Suraj
- Akshay Acharya
- Ajainder Negi

These players were part of the final 19 players squad for the 67th edition of the National Football Championship for the Santosh Trophy.

In addition to these players, Vishal Kaith, who plays for Senior India, is originally from Himachal. He is a notable player who has had opportunities to play outside the state.

== Future prospects ==
The Himachal Pradesh Football Team is committed to fostering the growth of football at the grassroots level. The HPFA continues to implement initiatives aimed at identifying and nurturing young talent, ensuring a bright future for football in the state.
