= Bihar football team =

Bihar
- Full name: Bihar football team
- Ground: Various
- Owner: Bihar Football Association
- Head coach: Nipendra Kumar Das
- League: Santosh Trophy
- 2024–25: Group stage
Home colours	Away colours

The Bihar football team is an Indian football team representing Bihar in Indian state football competitions including the Santosh Trophy. They have failed to qualify for the final rounds of most Santosh Trophy editions.

== Current squad ==
Note: Flags indicate national team as defined under FIFA eligibility rules; some limited exceptions apply. Players may hold more than one non-FIFA nationality.

No.	Pos.	Nation	Player
1	GK	IND	MD Faimey
2	DF	IND	Vivek Kumar Singh
3	DF	IND	Saurabh Kumar
4	DF	IND	Salauddin Middya
5	DF	IND	Jiran Ali Ansari
6	MF	IND	Ankit Kumar
7	MF	IND	Shubhankar Dey
8	FW	IND	Raphael Soren
9	FW	IND	Roushan Kumar
10	FW	IND	MD Sarfaraz

No.	Pos.	Nation	Player
11	FW	IND	Arif Khan
12	DF	IND	MD Musharraf Perwez
14	MF	IND	Abuzar Mohamed
15	MF	IND	Guman Shrestha
—	MF	IND	Avinash Paswan
—		IND	Guddu Kumar
—		IND	Rajan Kumar
—		IND	Jawed Ali Khan
—		IND	Raj Gupta
—		IND	Nuneshwar Murmu
—	ST	IND	Saryu kumar

== Honours ==
=== State (senior) ===
- National Games
  - Bronze medal (1): 1987

=== State (youth) ===
- B.C. Roy Trophy
  - Winners (2): 1996–97, 2000–01
- Mir Iqbal Hussain Trophy
  - Winners (4): 1995–96, 1996–97, 1997–98, 2001–02
  - Runners-up (1): 1998–99
