= Uttar Pradesh football team =

Uttar Pradesh
- Full name: Uttar Pradesh football team
- Founded: 1941; 84 years ago (as United Provinces football team)
- Ground: Various
- Owner: Uttar Pradesh Football Sangh
- Head coach: Ravi Kumar Punia
- League: Santosh Trophy
- 2024–25: Group stage
Home colours	Away colours

The Uttar Pradesh football team, also earlier the United Provinces football team, is an Indian football team representing Uttar Pradesh in Indian state football competitions including the Santosh Trophy.

== Honours ==
=== State (youth) ===
- B.C. Roy Trophy
  - Winners (2): 2017–18, 2023–24
- Mir Iqbal Hussain Trophy
  - Winners (1): 2008–09
  - Runners-up (2): 1978–79, 1980
