= Maharashtra football team =

Maharashtra
- Full name: Maharashtra football team
- Founded: 1941; 85 years ago (as Bombay football team)
- Owner: Western India Football Association
- Head coach: Santosh Kashyap
- League: Santosh Trophy
- 2024–25: Group stage
Home colours	Away colours

The Maharashtra football team, also earlier the Bombay football team, is an Indian football team representing Maharashtra in Indian state football competitions including the Santosh Trophy.

They have appeared in the Santosh Trophy finals 15 times, and have won the trophy 4 times. Prior to 1962, the team competed as Bombay.

== Honours ==
=== State (senior) ===
- Santosh Trophy
  - Winners (4): 1954–55, 1963–64, 1990–91, 1999–2000
  - Runners-up (12): 1945–46, 1947–48, 1951–52, 1956–57, 1957–58, 1959–60, 1961–62, 1976–77, 1984–85, 1992–93, 2005–06, 2015–16
- National Games
  - Gold medal (1): 1999
  - Bronze medal (2): 2001, 2015

=== State (youth) ===
- B.C. Roy Trophy
  - Runners-up (1): 1966–67
- M. Dutta Ray Trophy
  - Runners-up (1): 1996
