= 2013–14 Santosh Trophy Group Stage =

Football tournament

This article details the 2013-14 Santosh Trophy Group Stage.

The group stage features 10 teams: the 10 winners of the qualifiers.

The teams were drawn into two groups of five, and played each once in a round-robin format. The matchdays are from 24 February to 5 March.

The top two teams in each group advances to the Semi-Finals.

== Group A ==
| Team | Pld | W | D | L | GF | GA | GD | Pts |
|---|---|---|---|---|---|---|---|---|
| Kerala | 0 | 0 | 0 | 0 | 0 | 0 | 0 | 0 |
| Maharashtra | 0 | 0 | 0 | 0 | 0 | 0 | 0 | 0 |
| Mizoram | 0 | 0 | 0 | 0 | 0 | 0 | 0 | 0 |
| Services | 0 | 0 | 0 | 0 | 0 | 0 | 0 | 0 |
| Uttarakhand | 0 | 0 | 0 | 0 | 0 | 0 | 0 | 0 |

| 24 February 2014 | Uttarakhand | v | Maharashtra | Kanchenjunga Stadium, Siliguri |

| 24 February 2014 | Mizoram | v | Kerala | Kanchenjunga Stadium, Siliguri |

| 26 February 2014 | Services | v | Maharashtra | Kanchenjunga Stadium, Siliguri |

| 26 February 2014 | Kerala | v | Uttarakhand | Kanchenjunga Stadium, Siliguri |

| 28 February 2014 | Maharashtra | v | Mizoram | Kanchenjunga Stadium, Siliguri |

| 28 February 2014 | Services | v | Uttarakhand | Kanchenjunga Stadium, Siliguri |

| 2 March 2014 | Mizoram | v | Services | Kanchenjunga Stadium, Siliguri |

| 2 March 2014 | Maharashtra | v | Kerala | Kanchenjunga Stadium, Siliguri |

| 4 March 2014 | Kerala | v | Services | Kanchenjunga Stadium, Siliguri |

| 4 March 2014 | Uttarakhand | v | Mizoram | Kanchenjunga Stadium, Siliguri |

== Group B ==
| Team | Pld | W | D | L | GF | GA | GD | Pts |
|---|---|---|---|---|---|---|---|---|
| Goa | 0 | 0 | 0 | 0 | 0 | 0 | 0 | 0 |
| Punjab | 0 | 0 | 0 | 0 | 0 | 0 | 0 | 0 |
| Railways | 0 | 0 | 0 | 0 | 0 | 0 | 0 | 0 |
| Tamil Nadu | 0 | 0 | 0 | 0 | 0 | 0 | 0 | 0 |
| West Bengal | 0 | 0 | 0 | 0 | 0 | 0 | 0 | 0 |

| 25 February 2014 | Railways | v | Tamil Nadu | Kanchenjunga Stadium, Siliguri |

| 25 February 2014 | Goa | v | Punjab | Kanchenjunga Stadium, Siliguri |

| 27 February 2014 | West Bengal | v | Punjab | Kanchenjunga Stadium, Siliguri |

| 27 February 2014 | Tamil Nadu | v | Goa | Kanchenjunga Stadium, Siliguri |

| 1 March 2014 | West Bengal | v | Goa | Kanchenjunga Stadium, Siliguri |

| 1 March 2014 | Punjab | v | Railways | Kanchenjunga Stadium, Siliguri |

| 3 March 2014 | Punjab | v | Tamil Nadu | Kanchenjunga Stadium, Siliguri |

| 3 March 2014 | Railways | v | West Bengal | Kanchenjunga Stadium, Siliguri |

| 5 March 2014 | West Bengal | v | Tamil Nadu | Kanchenjunga Stadium, Siliguri |

| 5 March 2014 | Railways | v | Goa | Kanchenjunga Stadium, Siliguri |

AIFF 68th Santosh Trophy 2014
