= 2018–19 Santosh Trophy qualification =

2019 Santosh Trophy qualification
Tournament details
- Country: India
- Teams: 35

Tournament statistics
- Matches played: 45
- Goals scored: 119 (2.64 per match)
- Top goal scorer: (6 Goals) Pavan Ramanuj (Gujarat)
- All statistics correct as of 16 February 2019.

The 2019 Santosh Trophy qualifiers was the qualifying round for the 73rd edition of the Santosh Trophy, the premier competition in India for teams representing their regional and state football associations.

== East Zone ==
The East Zone matches of the Santosh Trophy qualifiers started on 2 February 2019 in Bhilai, Chhattisgarh.

=== Group A ===
| Pos | Team | Pld | W | D | L | GF | GA | GD | Pts | Qualification |
|---|---|---|---|---|---|---|---|---|---|---|
| 1 | Odisha | 2 | 2 | 0 | 0 | 5 | 1 | +4 | 6 | Advance to Final Round |
| 2 | Chhattisgarh | 2 | 1 | 0 | 1 | 2 | 4 | −2 | 3 | |
| 3 | Jharkhand | 2 | 0 | 0 | 2 | 2 | 4 | −2 | 0 | |

Rules for classification: 1) points; 2) head-to-head points; 3) head-to-head goal difference; 4) goal difference; 5) number of goals scored; 6) drawing of lots

| 2 February 2019 | Jharkhand | 1–2 | Chhattisgarh | Bhilai, Chhattisgarh |
| 15:00 IST | Shamim Hussain 22' | Report | Somnath 73', 86' | Stadium: Pant Stadium |

| 4 February 2019 | Jharkhand | 1–2 | Odisha | Bhilai, Chhattisgarh |
| 15:00 IST | Krishnkant Prapat 68' | Report | Arjun Nayak 13'; Arbin Lakra 52' | Stadium: Pant Stadium |

| 6 February 2019 | Odisha | 3–0 | Chhattisgarh | Bhilai, Chhattisgarh |
| 15:00 IST | Arbin Lakra 31', 45'; Arjun Nayak 82' | | | Stadium: Pant Stadium |

=== Group B ===
| Pos | Team | Pld | W | D | L | GF | GA | GD | Pts | Qualification |
|---|---|---|---|---|---|---|---|---|---|---|
| 1 | Sikkim | 2 | 1 | 1 | 0 | 5 | 2 | +3 | 4 | Advance to Final Round |
| 2 | West Bengal | 2 | 1 | 1 | 0 | 2 | 1 | +1 | 4 | |
| 3 | Bihar | 2 | 0 | 0 | 2 | 1 | 5 | −4 | 0 | |

Rules for classification: 1) points; 2) head-to-head points; 3) head-to-head goal difference; 4) goal difference; 5) number of goals scored; 6) drawing of lots

| 3 February 2019 | West Bengal | 1–0 | Bihar | Bhilai, Chhattisgarh |
| 15:00 IST | Hira Mondal 3' | | | Stadium: Pant Stadium |

| 5 February 2019 | Bihar | 1–4 | Sikkim | Bhilai, Chhattisgarh |
| 15:00 IST | Arif Khan | | Kunal Tamang; Asish Chetri; Bibek Bhutia; Sanjay Rai | Stadium: Pant Stadium |

| 7 February 2019 | Sikkim | 1–1 | West Bengal | Bhilai, Chhattisgarh |
| 15:00 IST | Sonam Bhutia 12' (pen.) | | Arijeet Singh 40' | Stadium: Pant Stadium |

== South Zone ==
The South Zone matches of the Santosh Trophy qualifiers started on 3 February 2019 in Neyveli, Tamil Nadu.

=== Group A ===
| Pos | Team | Pld | W | D | L | GF | GA | GD | Pts | Qualification |
|---|---|---|---|---|---|---|---|---|---|---|
| 1 | Karnataka | 2 | 1 | 1 | 0 | 6 | 1 | +5 | 4 | Advance to Final Round |
| 2 | Tamil Nadu | 2 | 0 | 2 | 0 | 2 | 2 | 0 | 2 | |
| 3 | Andhra Pradesh | 2 | 0 | 1 | 1 | 1 | 6 | −5 | 1 | |

Rules for classification: 1) points; 2) head-to-head points; 3) head-to-head goal difference; 4) goal difference; 5) number of goals scored; 6) drawing of lots

| 3 February 2019 | Tamil Nadu | 1–1 | Andhra Pradesh | Neyveli Lignite Corporation Ground, Tamil Nadu |
| 15:00 IST | T. Vijay 63' | Report | G.Manjunath 12' (pen.) |

| 5 February 2019 | Andhra Pradesh | 0–5 | Karnataka | Neyveli Lignite Corporation Ground, Tamil Nadu |
| 15:00 IST | | | Leon Augustine 32'; Sunil Kumar 73'; Manvir Singh 83'; P.P. Shafeel 90+1'; Nikhil Raj 90+3' |

| 7 February 2019 | Tamil Nadu | 1–1 | Karnataka | Neyveli Lignite Corporation Ground, Tamil Nadu |
| 15:00 IST | N. Solaimailai 74' | | A. S. Ashik 39' |

=== Group B ===
| Pos | Team | Pld | W | D | L | GF | GA | GD | Pts | Qualification |
|---|---|---|---|---|---|---|---|---|---|---|
| 1 | Services | 3 | 2 | 0 | 1 | 5 | 2 | +3 | 6 | Advance to Final Round |
| 2 | Telangana | 3 | 1 | 2 | 0 | 2 | 1 | +1 | 5 | |
| 3 | Kerala | 3 | 0 | 2 | 1 | 0 | 1 | −1 | 2 | |
| 4 | Pondicherry | 3 | 0 | 2 | 1 | 0 | 3 | −3 | 2 | |

Rules for classification: 1) points; 2) head-to-head points; 3) head-to-head goal difference; 4) goal difference; 5) number of goals scored; 6) drawing of lots

| 4 February 2019 | Kerala | 0–0 | Telangana | Neyveli Lignite Corporation Ground, Tamil Nadu |
| 9:00 IST | | Report |

| 4 February 2019 | Services | 3–0 | Pondicherry | Neyveli Lignite Corporation Ground, Tamil Nadu |
| 16:00 IST | R. Sudhakaran 42' (o.g.); N. Herojit Singh 67'; Mohammed Danish 68' | Report |

| 6 February 2019 | Pondicherry | 0–0 | Kerala | Neyveli Lignite Corporation Ground, Tamil Nadu |
| 9:00 IST |

| 6 February 2019 | Telangana | 2–1 | Services | Neyveli Lignite Corporation Ground, Tamil Nadu |
| 16:00 IST | Shaun Campbell 7'; Shafique Mohammed 45' | | Hari Krishna 89' |

| 8 February 2019 | Telangana | 0–0 | Pondicherry | Neyveli Lignite Corporation Ground, Tamil Nadu |
| 9:00 IST |

| 8 February 2019 | Services | 1–0 | Kerala | Neyveli Lignite Corporation Ground, Tamil Nadu |
| 16:00 IST | Vikas Thapa 63' |

== West Zone ==
The West Zone matches of the Santosh Trophy qualifiers started on 7 February 2019 in Solapur, Maharashtra.

=== Group A ===
| Pos | Team | Pld | W | D | L | GF | GA | GD | Pts | Qualification |
|---|---|---|---|---|---|---|---|---|---|---|
| 1 | Goa | 3 | 2 | 1 | 0 | 5 | 0 | +5 | 7 | Advance to Final Round |
| 2 | Madhya Pradesh | 3 | 2 | 0 | 1 | 3 | 1 | +2 | 6 | |
| 3 | Daman and Diu | 3 | 0 | 2 | 1 | 0 | 2 | −2 | 2 | |
| 4 | Lakshadweep | 3 | 0 | 1 | 2 | 0 | 5 | −5 | 1 | |

Rules for classification: 1) points; 2) head-to-head points; 3) head-to-head goal difference; 4) goal difference; 5) number of goals scored; 6) drawing of lots

| 7 February 2019 | Goa | 0–0 | Daman and Diu | Indira Gandhi Stadium, Solapur, Maharashtra |
| 9:30 |

| 7 February 2019 | Madhya Pradesh | 1–0 | Lakshadweep | Indira Gandhi Stadium, Solapur, Maharashtra |
| 15:00 | Baldhir Tigga 29' |

| 9 February 2019 | Daman and Diu | 0–2 | Madhya Pradesh | Indira Gandhi Stadium, Solapur, Maharashtra |
| 9:00 | | | Baldhir Tigga 72'; Akash Bharbar 83' |

| 9 February 2019 | Goa | 4–0 | Lakshadweep | Indira Gandhi Stadium, Solapur, Maharashtra |
| 15:30 | Joaquim Abranches 8', 73'; Lalawmpuia 11', 65' |

| 11 February 2019 | Daman and Diu | 0–0 | Lakshadweep | Indira Gandhi Stadium, Solapur, Maharashtra |
| 9:00 |

| 11 February 2019 | Goa | 1–0 | Madhya Pradesh | Indira Gandhi Stadium, Solapur, Maharashtra |
| 15:300 | Joaquim Abranches 23' |

=== Group B ===
| Pos | Team | Pld | W | D | L | GF | GA | GD | Pts | Qualification |
|---|---|---|---|---|---|---|---|---|---|---|
| 1 | Maharashtra | 3 | 3 | 0 | 0 | 15 | 1 | +14 | 9 | Advance to Final Round |
| 2 | Gujarat | 3 | 2 | 0 | 1 | 17 | 4 | +13 | 6 | |
| 3 | Rajasthan | 3 | 1 | 0 | 2 | 4 | 8 | −4 | 3 | |
| 4 | Dadra and Nagar Haveli | 3 | 0 | 0 | 3 | 1 | 24 | −23 | 0 | |

Rules for classification: 1) points; 2) head-to-head points; 3) head-to-head goal difference; 4) goal difference; 5) number of goals scored; 6) drawing of lots

| 8 February 2019 | Gujarat | 1–4 | Maharashtra | Indira Gandhi Stadium, Solapur, Maharashtra |
| 9:00 | Musamiyan Syed 65' | | Arif Shaikh 7' (pen.); Mrunal Tandel 10'; Lineker Machado 46'; Rohan Shukla 56' |

| 8 February 2019 | Rajasthan | 4–1 | Dadra and Nagar Haveli | Indira Gandhi Stadium, Solapur, Maharashtra |
| 15:30 | Karandev 22'; Vishal Goutam 26'; Himanshu Rao 81', 93' | | Kuldip Vatra 41' |

| 10 February 2019 | Rajasthan | 0–6 | Gujarat | Indira Gandhi Stadium, Solapur, Maharashtra |
| 9:00 | | | Musamiyan Syed 15', 83'; Aditya Jha 52', 54'; Pavan Ramanuj 70'; Arjun Chaudhary 90+2' |

| 10 February 2019 | Dadra and Nagar Haveli | 0–10 | Maharashtra | Indira Gandhi Stadium, Solapur, Maharashtra |
| 15:30 | | | Sanket Salokhe 18'; Arif Shaikh; Mrunal Tandel; Lineker Machado; Rohan Shukla; Vinodkumar Pandey |

| 12 February 2019 | Gujarat | 10–0 | Dadra and Nagar Haveli | Indira Gandhi Stadium, Solapur, Maharashtra |
| 9:00 | Pavan Ramanuj 6', 10', 34', 41', 48'; Aditya Jha 14', 65'; Musamiyan Syed 68' Nitin Singh; Francis Barbosa 69' (o.g.) |

| 12 February 2019 | Rajasthan | 0–1 | Maharashtra | Indira Gandhi Stadium, Solapur, Maharashtra |
| 15:30 | | | Dhruwesh Nijap 67' |

== North Zone ==
The North Zone matches of the Santosh Trophy qualifiers started on 11 February 2019 in Katra, Jammu and Kashmir.

=== Group A ===
| Pos | Team | Pld | W | D | L | GF | GA | GD | Pts | Qualification |
|---|---|---|---|---|---|---|---|---|---|---|
| 1 | Punjab | 3 | 3 | 0 | 0 | 5 | 1 | +4 | 9 | Advance to Final Round |
| 2 | Uttar Pradesh | 3 | 1 | 1 | 1 | 1 | 1 | 0 | 4 | |
| 3 | Himachal Pradesh | 3 | 1 | 0 | 2 | 4 | 2 | +2 | 3 | |
| 4 | Haryana | 3 | 0 | 1 | 2 | 1 | 7 | −6 | 1 | |

Rules for classification: 1) points; 2) head-to-head points; 3) head-to-head goal difference; 4) goal difference; 5) number of goals scored; 6) drawing of lots

| 12 February 2019 | Punjab | 3–1 | Haryana | Katra, Jammu and Kashmir |
| 10:00 | Paramjit Singh 51'; Jaspreet Singh 68', 82' | | Parveen Dhull 65' | Attendance: 100; Referee: Lanthoiba Pheirojam |

| 12 February 2019 | Himachal Pradesh | 0–1 | Uttar Pradesh | Shrine Board Complex, Katra, Jammu and Kashmir |
| 14:00 | | | Ankur Kumar Sharma 82' |

| 14 February 2019 | Haryana | 0–0 | Uttar Pradesh | Katra, Jammu and Kashmir |
| 10:00 |

| 14 February 2019 | Himachal Pradesh | 0–1 | Punjab | Shrine Board Complex, Katra, Jammu and Kashmir |
| 14:00 | | | Harpal Singh 37' (pen.) |

| 16 February 2019 | Himachal Pradesh | 4–0 | Haryana | Katra, Jammu and Kashmir |
| 10:00 | Bhemant 15'; Nikhil 45'; Mohit 73'; Mukesh 90' |

| 16 February 2019 | Uttar Pradesh | 0–1 | Punjab | Shrine Board Complex, Katra, Jammu and Kashmir |
| 14:00 | | | Sukhpreet Singh 76' (pen.) |

=== Group B ===
| Pos | Team | Pld | W | D | L | GF | GA | GD | Pts | Qualification |
|---|---|---|---|---|---|---|---|---|---|---|
| 1 | Delhi | 3 | 3 | 0 | 0 | 5 | 1 | +4 | 9 | Advance to Final Round |
| 2 | Jammu and Kashmir | 3 | 2 | 0 | 1 | 4 | 3 | +1 | 6 | |
| 3 | Chandigarh | 3 | 1 | 0 | 2 | 4 | 3 | +1 | 3 | |
| 4 | Uttarakhand | 3 | 0 | 0 | 3 | 3 | 9 | −6 | 0 | |

Rules for classification: 1) points; 2) head-to-head points; 3) head-to-head goal difference; 4) goal difference; 5) number of goals scored; 6) drawing of lots

| 11 February 2019 | Delhi | 1–0 | Chandigarh | Katra, Jammu and Kashmir |
| 10:00 | Nitesh Chikara 38' | | | Attendance: 200; Referee: James Joy |

| 11 February 2019 | Jammu & Kashmir | 3–1 | Uttarakhand | Shrine Board Complex, Katra, Jammu and Kashmir |
| 14:00 | Goutan Mehra 24'; Shakir Ahmad 83' (pen.); Aakif Javed 87' | | Vishal Nagarkoti 7' | Attendance: 1000; Referee: Nripen Halder |

| 13 February 2019 | Jammu & Kashmir | 0–2 | Delhi | Katra, Jammu and Kashmir |
| 10:00 | | | Tushar Chaudhary 13'; Vivek Gulati 39' (o.g.) | Attendance: 500; Referee: Animesh Biswas |

| 13 February 2019 | Chandigarh | 4–1 | Uttarakhand | Shrine Board Complex, Katra, Jammu and Kashmir |
| 14:00 | Amit Kumar 47', 73'; Ravinder Singh 54'; Gaurav Negi 86' | | Chirag Negi 49' |

| 15 February 2019 | Uttarakhand | 1–2 | Delhi | Katra, Jammu and Kashmir |
| 10:00 | 90' | | Adhikari 26'; Kushant Chauhan 86' |

| 15 February 2019 | Chandigarh | 0–1 | Jammu & Kashmir | Shrine Board Complex, Katra, Jammu and Kashmir |
| 14:00 | | | Asif Ashraf 47' |

== North-East Zone ==
The North-East Zone matches of the Santosh Trophy qualifiers started on 11 February 2019 in Aizawl, Mizoram.

In Group B, Nagaland withdrew just before the qualifiers after they failed to register players in Centralised Registration System.

=== Group A ===
| Pos | Team | Pld | W | D | L | GF | GA | GD | Pts | Qualification |
|---|---|---|---|---|---|---|---|---|---|---|
| 1 | Meghalaya | 2 | 2 | 0 | 0 | 4 | 0 | +4 | 6 | Advance to Final Round |
| 2 | Mizoram | 2 | 1 | 0 | 1 | 3 | 1 | +2 | 3 | |
| 3 | Tripura | 2 | 0 | 0 | 2 | 0 | 6 | −6 | 0 | |

Rules for classification: 1) points; 2) head-to-head points; 3) head-to-head goal difference; 4) goal difference; 5) number of goals scored; 6) drawing of lots

| 11 February 2019 | Meghalaya | 3–0 | Tripura | Lammual, Aizawl, Mizoram |
| 14:00 | Donald Diengdoh 11', 53'; Brolington Warlarpih 42' |

| 13 February 2019 | Mizoram | 3–0 | Tripura | Lammual, Aizawl, Mizoram |
| 14:00 | Ramhlunchhunga 16', 60'; MC Malsawmzuala 50' (pen.) |

| 15 February 2019 | Mizoram | 0–1 | Meghalaya | Lammual, Aizawl, Mizoram |
| 14:00 | | | Kynsaiborlang Lhuid 30' |

=== Group B ===
| Pos | Team | Pld | W | D | L | GF | GA | GD | Pts | Qualification |
|---|---|---|---|---|---|---|---|---|---|---|
| 1 | Assam | 2 | 2 | 0 | 0 | 4 | 2 | +2 | 6 | Advance to Final Round |
| 2 | Manipur | 2 | 1 | 0 | 1 | 2 | 2 | 0 | 3 | |
| 3 | Arunachal Pradesh | 2 | 0 | 0 | 2 | 0 | 2 | −2 | 0 | |

Rules for classification: 1) points; 2) head-to-head points; 3) head-to-head goal difference; 4) goal difference; 5) number of goals scored; 6) drawing of lots

| 12 February 2019 | Arunachal Pradesh | 0–1 | Manipur | Lammual, Aizawl, Mizoram |
| 14:00 | | | Wahengbam Angousana Luaang 72' (pen.) |

| 14 February 2019 | Arunachal Pradesh | 1–2 | Assam | Lammual, Aizawl, Mizoram |
| 14:00 | Tarh Dolu 21' | | Bishnu Bordoloi 55'; Akrang Narzary 76' |

| 16 February 2019 | Assam | 2–1 | Manipur | Lammual, Aizawl, Mizoram |
| 14:00 | Milan Basumatary 57' (pen.); Bishnu Bordoloi 90+3' | | Ginminthang Hangsing 42' |

== Goalscorers ==
As of 16 February 2019

6 Goals

- Pavan Ramanuj (Gujarat)

4 Goals

- Sanket Salokhe (Maharashtra)
- Aditya Jha (Gujarat)
- Musamiyan Syed (Gujarat)

3 Goals

- Joaquim Abranches (Goa)
- Arif Shaikh (Maharashtra)
- Arbin Lakra (Odisha)

2 Goals

- Bishnu Bordoloi (Assam)
- Ravinder Singh (Chandigarh)
- Somnath (Chhattisgarh)
- Lalawmpuia (Goa)
- Baldhir Tigga (Madhya Pradesh)
- Lineker Machado (Maharashtra)
- Mrunal Tandel (Maharashtra)
- Rohan Shukla (Maharashtra)
- Donald Diengdoh (Meghalaya)
- Ramhlunchhunga (Mizoram)
- Arjun Nayak (Odisha)
- Jaspreet Singh (Punjab)
- Himanshu Rao (Rajasthan)

1 Goal

- G.Manjunath (Andhra Pradesh)
- Tarh Dolu (Arunachal Pradesh)
- Akrang Narzary (Assam)
- Milan Basumatary (Assam)
- Arif Khan (Bihar)
- Amit Kumar (Chandigarh)
- Gaurav Negi (Chandigarh)
- Kuldip Vatra (Dadra & Nagar Haveli)
- Ayush Adhikari (Delhi)
- Kushant Chauhan (Delhi)
- Nitesh Chikara (Delhi)
- Tushar Chaudhary (Delhi)
- Arjun Chaudhary (Gujarat)
- Nitin Singh (Gujarat)
- Parveen Dhull (Haryana)
- Bhemant (Himachal Pradesh)
- Mohit (Himachal Pradesh)
- Mukesh (Himachal Pradesh)
- Nikhil (Himachal Pradesh)
- Aakif Javed (Jammu & Kashmir)
- Asif Ashraf (Jammu & Kashmir)
- Goutam Mehra (Jammu & Kashmir)
- Shakir Ahmad (Jammu & Kashmir)
- Krishnakant Prapat (Jharkhand)
- Shamim Hussain (Jharkhand)
- A. S. Ashik (Karnataka)
- Leon Augustine (Karnataka)
- Manvir Singh (Karnataka)
- Nikhil Raj (Karnataka)
- P. P. Shafeel (Karnataka)
- Sunil Kumar (Karnataka)
- Akash Bharbar (Madhya Pradesh)
- Dhruwesh Nijap (Maharashtra)
- Vinodkumar Pandey (Maharashtra)
- Ginminthang Hangsing (Manipur)
- Wahengbam Angousana Lupang (Manipur)
- Brolington Warlarpih (Meghalaya)
- MC Malsawmzuala (Mizoram)
- Harpal Singh (Punjab)
- Paramjit Singh (Punjab)
- Sukhpreet Singh (Punjab)
- Karandev (Rajasthan)
- Vishal Goutam (Rajasthan)
- Hari Krishna (Services)
- N. Herojit Singh (Services)
- Mohammed Danish (Services)
- Vikas Thapa (Services)
- Ashish Chettri (Sikkim)
- Bibek Bhutia (Sikkim)
- Kunal Tamang (Sikkim)
- Sanjay Rai (Sikkim)
- Sonam Bhutia (Sikkim)
- N. Solaimalai (Tamil Nadu)
- T. Vijay (Tamil Nadu)
- Shaun Campbell (Telangana)
- Shafique Mohammed (Telangana)
- Chirag Negi (Uttarakhand)
- Vishal Nagarkoti (Uttarakhand)
- Ankur Kumar Sharma (Uttar Pradesh)
- Arijeet Singh (West Bengal)
- Hira Mondal (West Bengal)

== Notable players ==
| Position | Player | Team |
|---|---|---|
| MF | Milan Basumatary | Assam |
| MF | Ravinder Singh | Chandigarh |
| DF | Nirmal Chettri | Daman & Diu |
| DF | Sonu Beniwal | Delhi |
| GK | Tyson Caiado | Goa |
| DF | Joseph Clemente | Goa |
| DF | Meldon D'Silva | Goa |
| DF | Peter Carvalho | Goa |
| MF | Glan Martins | Goa |
| MF | Velito Cruz | Goa |
| FW | Joaquim Abranches | Goa |
| DF | Prashanth Kalinga | Karnataka |
| DF | Naorem Roshan Singh | Karnataka |
| MF | Gunashekar Vignesh | Karnataka |
| GK | Midhun V | Kerala |
| MF | Arif Shaikh | Maharashtra |
| MF | Lineker Machado | Maharashtra |
| DF | Naorem James Singh | Manipur |
| DF | Samuel Shadap | Meghalaya |
| GK | Zothanmawia | Mizoram |
| DF | Imanuel Lalthazuala | Mizoram |
| DF | Ashish Chettri | Sikkim |
| MF | Sonam Bhutia | Sikkim |
| MF | Dinesh Kumar | Tamilnadu |
| DF | Avinabo Bag | West Bengal |
| DF | Koushik Sarkar | West Bengal |
| MF | Dipendu Dowary | West Bengal |
| FW | Naro Hari Shrestha | West Bengal |
