= 2014–15 Santosh Trophy =

2015 Santosh Trophy
Tournament details
- Country: India
- Teams: 10

Final positions
- Champions: Services (4th title)
- Runners-up: Punjab

Tournament statistics
- Matches played: 22
- Goals scored: 43 (1.95 per match)
- Top goal scorer: Raja Das (4 goals)

The 2015 Santosh Trophy is the 69th edition of the Santosh Trophy, the main state competition in Indian football. 33 teams in total from around India entered the competition. Only 10 teams competed in the competition proper after going through the qualifiers. The tournament proper began on 1 March and will conclude with the final on 15 March.

== Round and dates ==
Round	Match dates	Teams
Qualifiers	10 January 2015 – 23 January 2015	33
Group stage	1 March 2015 – 10 March 2015	10
Semi-finals	12 March 2015 – 13 March 2015	4
Final	15 March 2015	2

== Qualified teams ==
The following ten teams qualified for the Santosh Trophy proper.

- Assam
- Delhi
- Goa
- Kerala
- Maharashtra
- Mizoram
- Punjab
- Railways
- Services
- West Bengal

== Group stage ==
=== Group A ===
Team	Pld	W	D	L	GF	GA	GD	Pts
Services	4	2	2	0	5	1	+4	8
Punjab	4	2	2	0	4	1	+3	8
West Bengal	4	2	2	0	4	2	+2	8
Maharashtra	4	1	0	3	8	6	+2	3
Assam	4	0	0	4	1	12	−11	0

1 March 2015	Punjab	2–0	Assam	Guru Nanak Stadium, Ludhiana
	P. Singh 17'; R. Singh 55'	Report

2 March 2015	Services	1–0	Maharashtra	Guru Nanak Stadium, Ludhiana
	Zonuntulunga 33'	Report(subscription required)

3 March 2015	Assam	0–1	West Bengal	Guru Nanak Stadium, Ludhiana
			Das 20'

4 March 2015	Services	0–0	Punjab	Guru Nanak Stadium, Ludhiana

5 March 2015	West Bengal	2–1	Maharashtra	Guru Nanak Stadium, Ludhiana
	Das 38', 78'	Report	Pathan 48'

6 March 2015	Assam	0–3	Services	Guru Nanak Stadium, Ludhiana
			Jain P 11'; Tudu 48', 54'

7 March 2015	West Bengal	0–0	Punjab	Guru Nanak Stadium, Ludhiana

8 March 2015	Maharashtra	6–1	Assam	Guru Nanak Stadium, Ludhiana
	Gadkari; Goal 2 Goal 3 Goal 4 Pathan 84'; Singh 90+2'	Report	Mandal 53'

9 March 2015	Services	1–1	West Bengal	Guru Nanak Stadium, Ludhiana
	Tudu 2'	Report	Das 3'

10 March 2015	Punjab	2–1	Maharashtra	Guru Nanak Stadium, Ludhiana
	Sunny 11', 66'	Report	Shetty 90+1' (pen.)

=== Group B ===
Team	Pld	W	D	L	GF	GA	GD	Pts
Mizoram	4	3	1	0	6	2	+4	10
Kerala	4	3	0	1	4	1	+3	9
Goa	4	1	2	1	5	4	+1	5
Delhi	4	0	2	2	0	4	−4	2
Railways	4	0	1	3	1	5	−4	1

1 March 2015	Delhi	2–0	Railways	Guru Gobind Singh Stadium, Jalandhar

2 March 2015	Kerala	1–0	Goa	Guru Gobind Singh Stadium, Jalandhar
	Naseeruddin 30'	Report

3 March 2015	Mizoram	2–0	Delhi	Guru Gobind Singh Stadium, Jalandhar
	Lalbiakaua 50'; Lalrinpuia 85'	Report

4 March 2015	Railways	1–3	Goa	Guru Gobind Singh Stadium, Jalandhar
	Toppo 25'		Fernandes 45'; Olivera 50', 71'

5 March 2015	Kerala	0–1	Mizoram	Guru Gobind Singh Stadium, Jalandhar
			Lalrinpuia

6 March 2015	Goa	0–0	Delhi	Guru Gobind Singh Stadium, Jalandhar

7 March 2015	Mizoram	1–0	Railways	Guru Gobind Singh Stadium, Jalandhar
	Unknown

8 March 2015	Delhi	0–2	Kerala	Guru Gobind Singh Stadium, Jalandhar
		Report	Ashik; Suhair

9 March 2015	Goa	2–2	Mizoram	Guru Gobind Singh Stadium, Jalandhar
	Masceranhas 11', 31'	Report	Zoremsanga 19'; Malsawmfela 47'

10 March 2015	Railways	0–1	Kerala	Guru Gobind Singh Stadium, Jalandhar
		Report	Ashik 90'

== Semi-finals ==
12 March 2015	Services	3–0 (a.e.t.)	Kerala	Guru Nanak Stadium, Ludhiana
	Chettri 96'; Singh 107'; Kumar 109'	Report

13 March 2015	Mizoram	1–1 (a.e.t.) (11–12 p)	Punjab	Guru Nanak Stadium, Ludhiana
	Lalbiakhlua 104'		Manveer 92'

== Final ==
15 March 2015

Services	0–0 (a.e.t.)	Punjab
	Report
Penalties
	5–4

Guru Nanak Stadium, Ludhiana

== Goalscorers ==
4 Goals

- (India) Raja Das (West Bengal)

3 Goals

- (India) Rama Beshra (Services)

2 Goals

- (India) Joerse Olivera (Goa)
- (India) Marcus Masceranhas (Goa)
- (India) Lalrinpuia (Mizoram)
- (India) Shabaz Pathan (Maharashtra)
- (India) Sunny (Punjab)
- (India) Usman Ashik (Kerala)

1 Goal

- (India) Prabhjot Singh (Punjab)
- (India) Rajbir Singh (Punjab)
- (India) Francis Zonuntulunga (Services)
- (India) Anthony Chettri (Services)
- (India) Rakesh Singh (Services)
- (India) Vivek Kumar (Services)
- (India) Jain P (Services)
- (India) Nasrudheen Cheriyath (Kerala)
- (India) V P Suhair (Kerala)
- (India) Lalbiakaua (Mizoram)
- (India) Zico Zoremsanga (Mizoram)
- (India) Malsawmfela (Mizoram)
- (India) Sashi Toppo (Railways)
- (India) Gabriel Fernandes (Goa)
- (India) Sandesh Gadkari (Maharashtra)
- (India) Baldeep Singh (Maharashtra)
- (India) Suraj Mandal (Assam)

== Notable players ==
Player	Team
Ankit Sharma	Delhi
Deepak Devrani	Delhi
Rovan Pereira	Goa
Mackroy Peixote	Goa
Micky Fernandes	Goa
Richard Costa	Goa
Angelo Colaco	Goa
Marcus Masceranhas	Goa
U.Jimshad	Kerala
Usman Ashik	Kerala
Nasrudheen	Kerala
Sachin Gawas	Maharashtra
Vijith Shetty	Maharashtra
Kailash Patil	Maharashtra
Sandesh Gadkari	Maharashtra
Lalrinzuala Khiangte	Mizoram
Ronald Zothanzama	Mizoram
Laldingngheta	Mizoram
Samson Ramengmawia	Mizoram
Lalrin Fela	Mizoram
Malsawmfela	Mizoram
Jagroop Singh	Punjab
Amarwant Singh	Punjab
Ravinder Singh	Punjab
Gurtej Singh	Punjab
Ajay Singh	Punjab
Keniston C	Railways
Deepak Mondal	West Bengal
Saikat Saha Roy	West Bengal
Phoolchand Hembram	West Bengal
Surabuddin Mollick	West Bengal
Imran Khan	West Bengal
