= Solapur Municipal Corporation =

Local civic body in Solapur, Maharashtra, India

Solapur Municipal Corporation Solapur Mahānagarpālikā
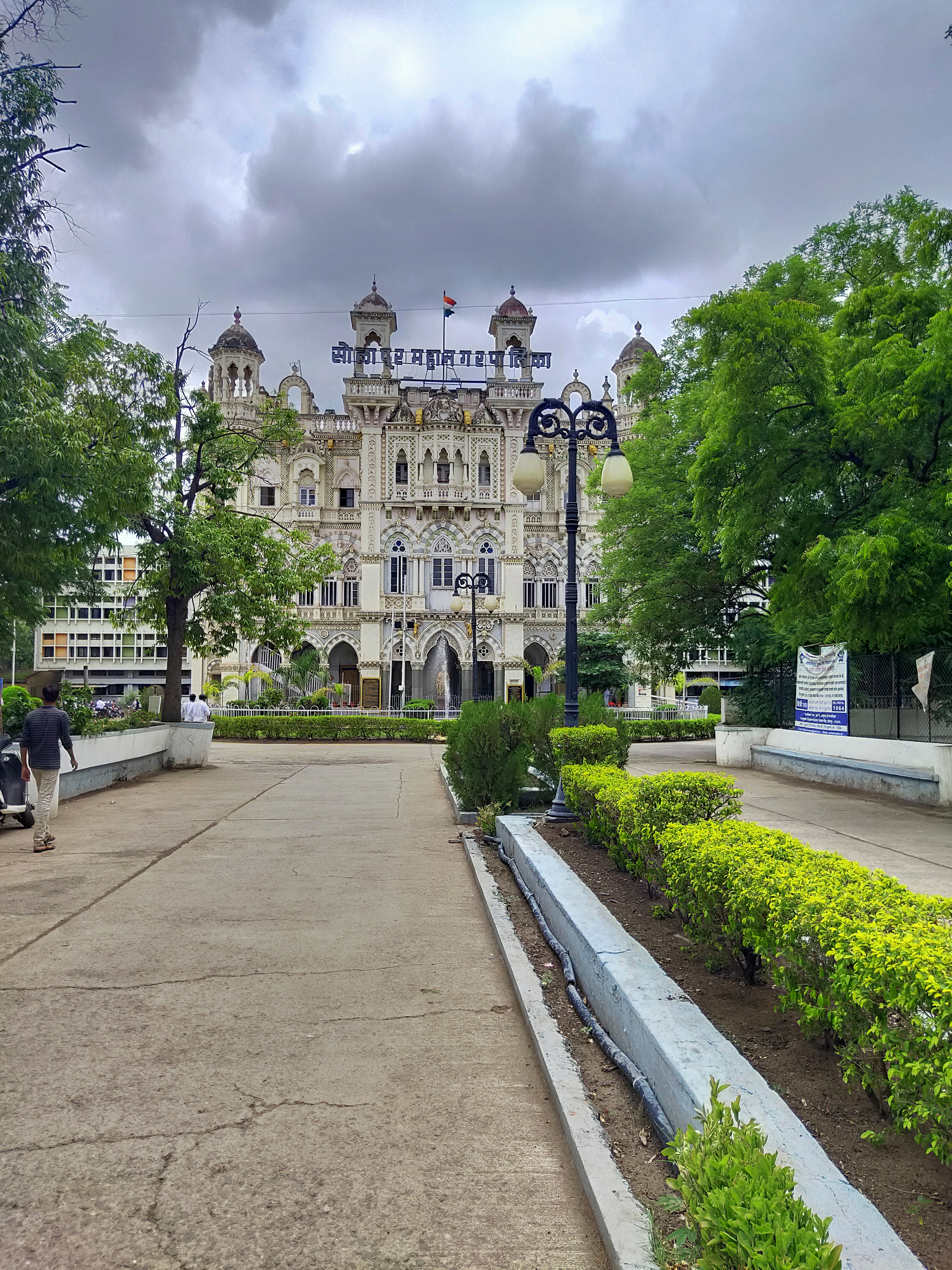

Type
- Type: Municipal Corporation of the Solapur

History
- Founded: 1963; 63 years ago
- Preceded by: Solapur Municipal Council(1898-1963)

Leadership
- Mayor: Vinayak Kondyal, BJP
- Deputy Mayor: Dnyaneshwari Devkar, BJP
- Municipal Commissioner: Dr. Sachin Ombase, IAS
- Leader of House: Narendra Kale, BJP
- Standing Committee Chairman: Ranjita Chakote, BJP

Structure
- Seats: 102
- Political groups: Government (87): BJP (87); Opposition (15): AIMIM (08); SHS (04); NCP (01); INC (02)
- Committees: Standing Committee; Ward Committees; Law Committee; City Development Committee; Women and Child Welfare Committee; Sports Committee
- Length of term: 5 years

Elections
- Voting system: First-past-the-post voting
- Last election: 15 January 2026
- Next election: 2031

Motto
- नगर सेवा हीच ईश्वर सेवा (IAST) "Service to the city is service to the God"

Meeting place
- Indra Bhavan, Ambedkar Chowk, Railway Lines, Solapur - 413001

Website
- Solapur Municipal Corporation

Solapur Municipal Corporation is the governing body of the city of Solapur in the Indian state of Maharashtra. The municipal corporation consists of democratically elected members, is headed by a mayor and administers the city's infrastructure, public services and police. Members from the state's leading various political parties hold elected offices in the corporation.

== History ==
Solapur Municipal Corporation is one of the oldest in India, established in 1860 as Solapur Municipality Council and granted Corporation status in 1963, after crossing threshold of 300,000 population.

Solapur Municipal Corporation is the administrative body of Solapur city in the Indian state of Maharashtra. It was established as Solapur Municipality Council in 1860.

Solapur Municipal Transport (SMT) is the department under corporation which handles public transport in city which has allegations of scam in bus purchase.

== Jurisdiction ==
Presently, the jurisdiction of SMC encompasses an area of 178.57 sq. km., with a population of 12.27 lakh (estimated for the year 2021), which was 951,118 as per Census of India 2011. The city is divided into 8 administrative zones, 26 election wards, and 98 Census wards.

=== Profile of city ===
Category	Details
Lakes	2
Govt. Hospital/Rural Hospital /Municipal Hospital	2
Maternity Home	9
Private Hospitals	250
Slums	220
Annual Budget	785 cr
Prabhags	51
Councillors	102+5
Gardens	18
Park	7
Playground	13
Stadium	3
Exhibition Ground	1
Swimming Pool	3
Zoo	1

== Administration and executive body ==
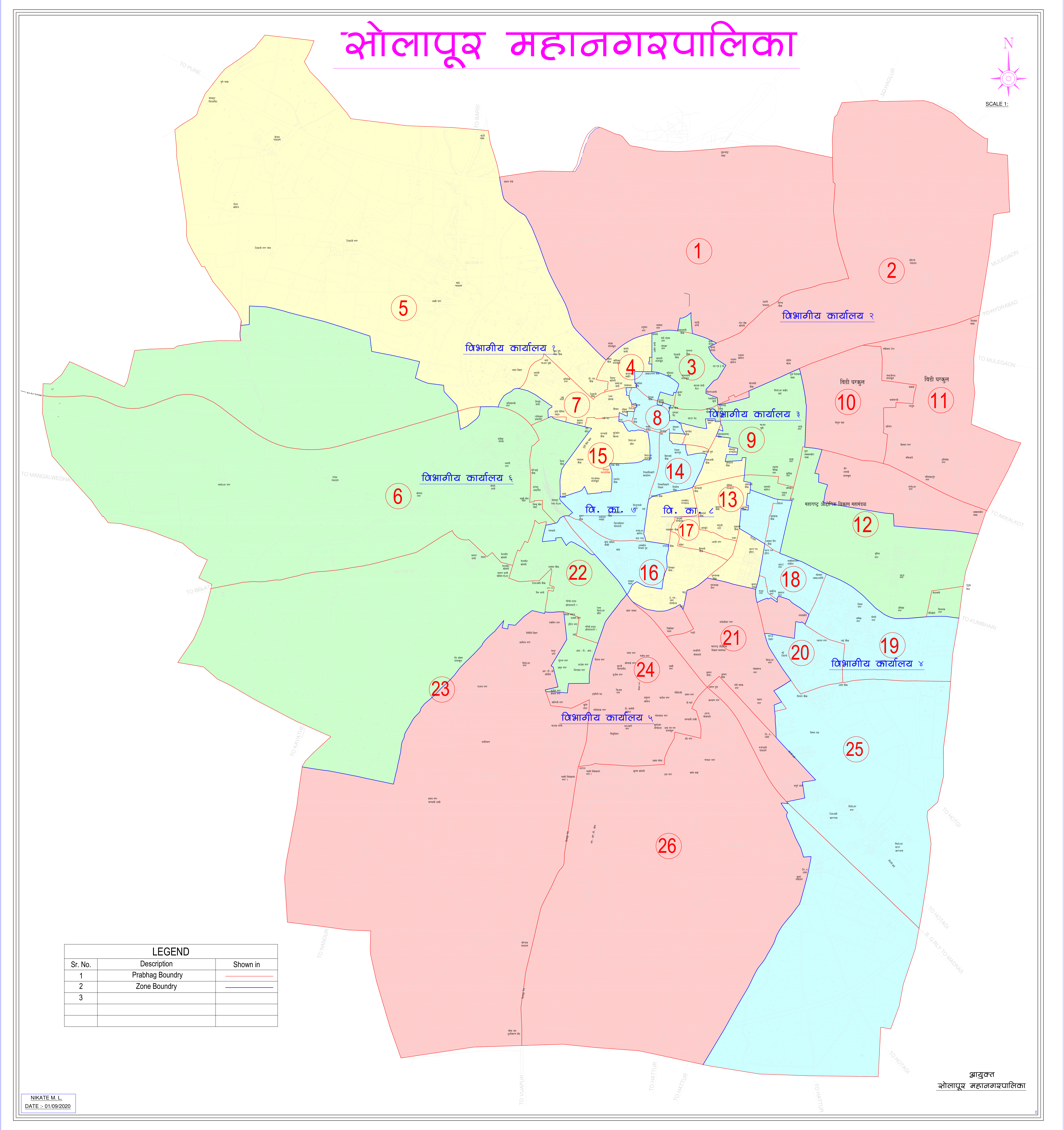
Solapur Municipal Corporation Political Map

The SMC is headed by an Indian Administrative Service officer who serves as Municipal Commissioner, wielding executive power. The Municipal Commissioner is appointed by Government of Maharashtra. The Municipal Commissioner is responsible for developing & maintaining civic infrastructure of the city like water supply, roads, storm water, drainage and efficient delivery of various services to the citizens of Solapur. The Municipal Commissioner deputes various departments to the Additional Municipal Commissioners, Deputy Municipal Commissioners, Assistant Commissioners and various heads of Department in discharge of his functions. The Municipal Commissioner is assisted by Additional Municipal Commissioners, Deputy Municipal Commissioners and Assistant Commissioners.

=== Zones ===
SMC is divided into 8 zones for convenient administration.

Sr. No.	Zone No	Headquarter	Jurisdiction	Number of Prabhags	Corresponding Prabhag Nos.
1	Zone - 1		Gandhi Chowk, Ramlal Chowk, Saint Joseph School, Solapur MaNaPa, Siddheshwar Mandir, Bhuikot Fort, etc.	5	4, 5, 6, 7, 15
2	Zone - 2			6	1, 2, 3, 10, 11, 12
3	Zone - 3			5	3, 4, 8, 9, 12
4	Zone - 4			4	14, 15, 16, 22
5	Zone - 5			6	8, 9, 13, 14, 16, 18
6	Zone - 6			6	5, 6, 15, 22, 23, 24
7	Zone - 7			7	16, 20, 21, 23, 24, 25, 26
8	Zone - 8			6	12, 13, 18, 19, 25, 26
	Total			51	

Total wards count in the above table is 45 (actual prabhag’s count is 26), because of some prabhag’s are in multiple Zones.

== Legislature and elected body ==
In order to make the administration of the city convenient, Solapur Municipal Corporation had a total of 26 divisions in 2017. So now in 2025 new draft, the number of divisions have been kept same. Each division had about four wards in 2017. In 2025, each division/ward has a total of 4 members. However, the exception is Division No. 25 & 26.

According to the new structure, the total number of ward is 102, of which 57 wards are reserved for women. While 16 wards have been reserved for Scheduled Castes, half of which are reserved for women of Scheduled Castes. Two wards were reserved for the Scheduled Tribes. One of the wards has been reserved for a scheduled caste woman.

- Total number of members: 102
- Number of four-member wards: 24
- Number of three-member wards: 02
- Total number of wards: 26

=== Wards ===
Political Representatives
Ward No.	Wards / Electoral College	Population	Seat	Councillor/ Corporator Name	Political Party	Alliance
1	Kasbe Solapur -2, Shelgi (Gavthan) - 1		A	Gautam Madhukar Kasabe	Bharatiya Janata Party	
1	Kasbe Solapur -2, Shelgi (Gavthan) - 1		B	Rajashri Ambadas Kanke	Bharatiya Janata Party	
1	Kasbe Solapur -2, Shelgi (Gavthan) - 1		C	Poonam Prabhakar Kashid	Bharatiya Janata Party	
1	Kasbe Solapur -2, Shelgi (Gavthan) - 1		D	Avinash Mahadev Patil	Bharatiya Janata Party	
2	Dahitane, Dayanand College, Satpute Wasti, Joshi Galli (Bhag), Kamakshi Nagar, Mitra Nagar, Shelgi - 2		A	Narayan Dattatray Bansode	Bharatiya Janata Party	
2	Dahitane, Dayanand College, Satpute Wasti, Joshi Galli (Bhag), Kamakshi Nagar, Mitra Nagar, Shelgi - 2		B	Kalpana Gyaneshwar Karbhari	Bharatiya Janata Party	
2	Dahitane, Dayanand College, Satpute Wasti, Joshi Galli (Bhag), Kamakshi Nagar, Mitra Nagar, Shelgi - 2		C	Shalan Shankar Shinde	Bharatiya Janata Party	
2	Dahitane, Dayanand College, Satpute Wasti, Joshi Galli (Bhag), Kamakshi Nagar, Mitra Nagar, Shelgi - 2		D	Kiran Vijaykumar Deshmukh	Bharatiya Janata Party	
3	Shahir Wasti, Ghongade Wasti, Jodbhavi Peth - 3		A	Rajkumar Patil	Bharatiya Janata Party	
3	Shahir Wasti, Ghongade Wasti, Jodbhavi Peth - 3		B	Swati Dattatray Badgu	Bharatiya Janata Party	
3	Shahir Wasti, Ghongade Wasti, Jodbhavi Peth - 3		C	Ranjita Sakalesh Chakote	Bharatiya Janata Party	
3	Shahir Wasti, Ghongade Wasti, Jodbhavi Peth - 3		D	Sanjay Basappa Koli	Bharatiya Janata Party	
4	Bagale Wasti, Yalleshwar Wadi, West Mangalwar Peth, East Mangalwar Peth - 4		A	Vandana Ajit Gaikwad	Bharatiya Janata Party	
4	Bagale Wasti, Yalleshwar Wadi, West Mangalwar Peth, East Mangalwar Peth - 4		B	Vinayak Fakir Vitkar	Bharatiya Janata Party	
4	Bagale Wasti, Yalleshwar Wadi, West Mangalwar Peth, East Mangalwar Peth - 4		C	Aishwarya Ganesh Sakhare	Bharatiya Janata Party	
4	Bagale Wasti, Yalleshwar Wadi, West Mangalwar Peth, East Mangalwar Peth - 4		D	Anant Gyaneshwar Jadhav	Bharatiya Janata Party	
5	Kegaon, Shivaji Nagar, Bale - 5		A	Samadhan Revansiddh Awale	Bharatiya Janata Party	
5	Kegaon, Shivaji Nagar, Bale - 5		B	Alka Anand Bhavar	Bharatiya Janata Party	
5	Kegaon, Shivaji Nagar, Bale - 5		C	Mandakini Todkari	Bharatiya Janata Party	
5	Kegaon, Shivaji Nagar, Bale - 5		D	Bijju Sangappa Pradhane	Bharatiya Janata Party	
6	Basweshwar Nagar, Degaon, Aamrai, Damani Nagar etc. - 6		A	Sonali Arjun Gaikwad	Bharatiya Janata Party	
6	Basweshwar Nagar, Degaon, Aamrai, Damani Nagar etc. - 6		B	Sunil Pandurang Khatke	Bharatiya Janata Party	
6	Basweshwar Nagar, Degaon, Aamrai, Damani Nagar etc. - 6		C	Mrunmayee Mahadev Gawali	Bharatiya Janata Party	
6	Basweshwar Nagar, Degaon, Aamrai, Damani Nagar etc. - 6		D	Ganesh Prakash Wankar	Bharatiya Janata Party	
7	Nirale Wasti, Uma Nagari, North Kasba(Bhag), South Kasba(Bhag) - 7		A	Aniket Pise	Shiv Sena (Eknath Shinde)	
7	Nirale Wasti, Uma Nagari, North Kasba(Bhag), South Kasba(Bhag) - 7		B	Shraddha Kiran Pawar	Bharatiya Janata Party	
7	Nirale Wasti, Uma Nagari, North Kasba(Bhag), South Kasba(Bhag) - 7		C	Manorama Sapate	Shiv Sena (Eknath Shinde)	
7	Nirale Wasti, Uma Nagari, North Kasba(Bhag), South Kasba(Bhag) - 7		D	Amol Shinde	Shiv Sena (Eknath Shinde)	
8	North Kasba(Bhag), South Kasba(Bhag), Shukrawar Peth, Ganesh Peth, Sakhar Peth - 8		A	Amar Marutirao Pudale	Bharatiya Janata Party	
8	North Kasba(Bhag), South Kasba(Bhag), Shukrawar Peth, Ganesh Peth, Sakhar Peth - 8		B	Geeta Govind Gawai	Bharatiya Janata Party	
8	North Kasba(Bhag), South Kasba(Bhag), Shukrawar Peth, Ganesh Peth, Sakhar Peth - 8		C	Babita Anantkumar Dhumma	Bharatiya Janata Party	
8	North Kasba(Bhag), South Kasba(Bhag), Shukrawar Peth, Ganesh Peth, Sakhar Peth - 8		D	Gaurishankar (Praveen) Kashinath Dargopattil	Bharatiya Janata Party	
9	Market Yard, Kuchan High School - 9		A	Shekhar Pandurang Ige	Bharatiya Janata Party	
9	Market Yard, Kuchan High School - 9		B	Kadambari Prakash Manjeli	Bharatiya Janata Party	
9	Market Yard, Kuchan High School - 9		C	Pooja Shrikant Wadekar	Bharatiya Janata Party	
9	Market Yard, Kuchan High School - 9		D	Meghnath Dattatray Yemul	Bharatiya Janata Party	
10	Sagar Chowk, Mahalaxmi Chowk, Rangraj Nagar, Pogul Mala - 10		A	Ujwala Avinash Dasari	Bharatiya Janata Party	
10	Sagar Chowk, Mahalaxmi Chowk, Rangraj Nagar, Pogul Mala - 10		B	Deepika Vasudev Yaldandi	Bharatiya Janata Party	
10	Sagar Chowk, Mahalaxmi Chowk, Rangraj Nagar, Pogul Mala - 10		C	Satish Nagnath Shirasilla	Bharatiya Janata Party	
10	Sagar Chowk, Mahalaxmi Chowk, Rangraj Nagar, Pogul Mala - 10		D	Prathamesh Mahesh Kothe	Bharatiya Janata Party	
11	Sambhaji High School, Samadhan Nagar, Mallikarjun Nagar - 11		A	Yuvraj Kondiba Sarvade	Bharatiya Janata Party	
11	Sambhaji High School, Samadhan Nagar, Mallikarjun Nagar - 11		B	Shardabai Vijay Rampure	Bharatiya Janata Party	
11	Sambhaji High School, Samadhan Nagar, Mallikarjun Nagar - 11		C	Meenakshi Dattatray Kadganche	Bharatiya Janata Party	
11	Sambhaji High School, Samadhan Nagar, Mallikarjun Nagar - 11		D	Ajay Chandrakant Ponnam	Bharatiya Janata Party	
12	Sunil Nagar, M.I.D.C - 12		A	Siddheshwar Ramlu Kamtam	Bharatiya Janata Party	
12	Sunil Nagar, M.I.D.C - 12		B	Sarika Siddharam Khajurgi	Bharatiya Janata Party	
12	Sunil Nagar, M.I.D.C - 12		C	Archana Raju Vadnal	Bharatiya Janata Party	
12	Sunil Nagar, M.I.D.C - 12		D	Vinayak Ramkrishna Kondyal	Bharatiya Janata Party	
13	Police Head Quarter, Walchand College Parisar - 13		A	Sunita Sunil Kamathi	Bharatiya Janata Party	
13	Police Head Quarter, Walchand College Parisar - 13		B	Ambika Hanmantu Chaugule	Bharatiya Janata Party	
13	Police Head Quarter, Walchand College Parisar - 13		C	Satyanarayan Ramayya Gurram	Bharatiya Janata Party	
13	Police Head Quarter, Walchand College Parisar - 13		D	Vijay Bhoomayya Chippa	Bharatiya Janata Party	
14	Begam Peth, North Sadar Bazar(Bhag) - 14		A	Akila Bhagnagari	All India Majlis-e-Ittehadul Muslimeen	
14	Begam Peth, North Sadar Bazar(Bhag) - 14		B	Asif Ahmad Sheikh	All India Majlis-e-Ittehadul Muslimeen	
14	Begam Peth, North Sadar Bazar(Bhag) - 14		C	Wahidabano Sheikh	All India Majlis-e-Ittehadul Muslimeen	
14	Begam Peth, North Sadar Bazar(Bhag) - 14		D	Taufiq Hatture	All India Majlis-e-Ittehadul Muslimeen	
15	Siddheshwar Mandir, Solapur Mahanagarpalika, Killa Parisar - 15		A	Shridevi John Fulare	Bharatiya Janata Party	
15	Siddheshwar Mandir, Solapur Mahanagarpalika, Killa Parisar - 15		B	Vijaya Nagesh Kharat	Bharatiya Janata Party	
15	Siddheshwar Mandir, Solapur Mahanagarpalika, Killa Parisar - 15		C	Vinod Dharma Bhosale	Bharatiya Janata Party	
15	Siddheshwar Mandir, Solapur Mahanagarpalika, Killa Parisar - 15		D	Chetan Narote	Indian National Congress	
16	Modi, Shaskiya Vishram Gruha, Police Aayuktalaya - 16		A	Narsing Asade	Indian National Congress	
16	Modi, Shaskiya Vishram Gruha, Police Aayuktalaya - 16		B	Shweta Prashant Kharat	Bharatiya Janata Party	
16	Modi, Shaskiya Vishram Gruha, Police Aayuktalaya - 16		C	Kalpana Santosh Kadam	Bharatiya Janata Party	
16	Modi, Shaskiya Vishram Gruha, Police Aayuktalaya - 16		D	Priyadarshan Sathe	Shiv Sena (Eknath Shinde)	
17	Kongad Kumbhar Wasti, Shastri Nagar - 17		A	Nirmala Harish Jangam	Bharatiya Janata Party	
17	Kongad Kumbhar Wasti, Shastri Nagar - 17		B	Bharatsingh Vitthalsingh Badurwale	Bharatiya Janata Party	
17	Kongad Kumbhar Wasti, Shastri Nagar - 17		C	Jugnubai Ambevale	Bharatiya Janata Party	
17	Kongad Kumbhar Wasti, Shastri Nagar - 17		D	Ravi Shankarsing Kayyavale	Bharatiya Janata Party	
18	Shaskiya Krida Sankul, Aakashwani Kendra - 18		A	Shrikanchana Ramesh Yennam	Bharatiya Janata Party	
18	Shaskiya Krida Sankul, Aakashwani Kendra - 18		B	Rajshri Shivshankar Dodamani	Bharatiya Janata Party	
18	Shaskiya Krida Sankul, Aakashwani Kendra - 18		C	Prashant Anil Palli	Bharatiya Janata Party	
18	Shaskiya Krida Sankul, Aakashwani Kendra - 18		D	Shivanand Sidramappa Patil	Bharatiya Janata Party	
19	Nilam Nagar, Shramjivi Nagar - 19		A	Kavita Hiralal Gajjam	Bharatiya Janata Party	
19	Nilam Nagar, Shramjivi Nagar - 19		B	Venkatesh Chandrayya Kondi	Bharatiya Janata Party	
19	Nilam Nagar, Shramjivi Nagar - 19		C	Kalavati Anand Gadge	Bharatiya Janata Party	
19	Nilam Nagar, Shramjivi Nagar - 19		D	Basavaraj Ramanna Kenganalkar	Bharatiya Janata Party	
20	Parasi Vihir, Swagat Nagar - 20		A	Safiya Choudhary	All India Majlis-e-Ittehadul Muslimeen	
20	Parasi Vihir, Swagat Nagar - 20		B	Anisa Mogal	All India Majlis-e-Ittehadul Muslimeen	
20	Parasi Vihir, Swagat Nagar - 20		C	Azhar Hundekari	All India Majlis-e-Ittehadul Muslimeen	
20	Parasi Vihir, Swagat Nagar - 20		D	Azharoddin Jahagirdar	All India Majlis-e-Ittehadul Muslimeen	
21	Mohite Nagar, Sahara Nagar, Gurunanak Nagar - 21		A	Sangita Shivaji Jadhav	Bharatiya Janata Party	
21	Mohite Nagar, Sahara Nagar, Gurunanak Nagar - 21		B	Shivaji Uttamrao Waghmode	Bharatiya Janata Party	
21	Mohite Nagar, Sahara Nagar, Gurunanak Nagar - 21		C	Manjeri Sanket Killedar	Bharatiya Janata Party	
21	Mohite Nagar, Sahara Nagar, Gurunanak Nagar - 21		D	Satvik Prashant Badwe	Bharatiya Janata Party	
22	Ramwadi, Limayewadi, Revansiddheshwar Mandir - 22		A	Dattatray Margu Nadgiri	Bharatiya Janata Party	
22	Ramwadi, Limayewadi, Revansiddheshwar Mandir - 22		B	Ambika Nagesh Gaikwad	Bharatiya Janata Party	
22	Ramwadi, Limayewadi, Revansiddheshwar Mandir - 22		C	Chaitrali Shivraj Gaikwad	Bharatiya Janata Party	
22	Ramwadi, Limayewadi, Revansiddheshwar Mandir - 22		D	Kisan Lakshman Jadhav	Bharatiya Janata Party	
23	Salgar Wasti, Nirmiti Vihar, Rajaswa Nagar, Soregaon, Pratap Nagar - 23		A	Satyajit Subodh Waghmode	Bharatiya Janata Party	
23	Salgar Wasti, Nirmiti Vihar, Rajaswa Nagar, Soregaon, Pratap Nagar - 23		B	Aarti Akshay Wakase	Bharatiya Janata Party	
23	Salgar Wasti, Nirmiti Vihar, Rajaswa Nagar, Soregaon, Pratap Nagar - 23		C	Gnyaneshwari Mahesh Devkar	Bharatiya Janata Party	
23	Salgar Wasti, Nirmiti Vihar, Rajaswa Nagar, Soregaon, Pratap Nagar - 23		D	Rajshekhar Mallikarjun Patil	Bharatiya Janata Party	
24	Sambhaji Talav, D-Mart, ITI, Jule Solapur (Bhag) - 24		A	Madhusudan Dinesh Jangam	Bharatiya Janata Party	
24	Sambhaji Talav, D-Mart, ITI, Jule Solapur (Bhag) - 24		B	Vanita Santosh Patil	Bharatiya Janata Party	
24	Sambhaji Talav, D-Mart, ITI, Jule Solapur (Bhag) - 24		C	Ashwini Mohan Chavan	Bharatiya Janata Party	
24	Sambhaji Talav, D-Mart, ITI, Jule Solapur (Bhag) - 24		D	Narendra Govind Kale	Bharatiya Janata Party	
25	Vimantal, Hatture Wasti, Siddheshwar Sakhar Karkhana - 25		A	Suman Jeevan Chabukswar	Bharatiya Janata Party	
25	Vimantal, Hatture Wasti, Siddheshwar Sakhar Karkhana - 25		B	Vaibhav Hatture	Nationalist Congress Party (Ajit Pawar)	
25	Vimantal, Hatture Wasti, Siddheshwar Sakhar Karkhana - 25		C	Vaishali Anil Bhopale	Bharatiya Janata Party	
26	Kalyan Nagar, S.R.P. Camp, Kumthe Gavthan - 26		A	Sangita Shankar Jadhav	Bharatiya Janata Party	
26	Kalyan Nagar, S.R.P. Camp, Kumthe Gavthan - 26		B	Deepak Vijay Jamadar	Bharatiya Janata Party	
26	Kalyan Nagar, S.R.P. Camp, Kumthe Gavthan - 26		C	Jaykumar Brahmadev Mane	Bharatiya Janata Party	

Nominated Corporators – Solapur Municipal Corporation (2026)
No.	Name	Party
1	Rohini Tadvalkar	Bharatiya Janata Party (BJP)
2	Akshay Anjikhane	Bharatiya Janata Party (BJP)
3	Manish Ket	Bharatiya Janata Party (BJP)
4	Vrushali Chalukya	Bharatiya Janata Party (BJP)
5	Srinivas Daima	Bharatiya Janata Party (BJP)
6	Rudresh Boramani	Bharatiya Janata Party (BJP)
7	Rishikesh Mhetre	Bharatiya Janata Party (BJP)
8	Dnyaneshwar Myakal	Bharatiya Janata Party (BJP)
9	Rishikesh Metre	Bharatiya Janata Party (BJP)

== List of mayors ==
List of Mayor of Solapur City SMC
#	Mayor	Term			Election	Party
1	Parasmal Jairam Joshi	1 May 1964	30 June 1966	2 years, 60 days		
2	Tatyasaheb Ghongde	1 July 1966	31 May 1967	334 days		
3	Irayya Narsayya Boli	26 June 1969	19 June 1970	358 days		
4	Ganeshappa Bali	19 June 1970	17 June 1971	363 days		
5	Vishwanath Banshetty	17 June 1971	16 June 1972	365 days		
6	Rajaram Burgul	17 June 1972	20 June 1973	1 year, 3 days		
7	Baburao Chakote	20 June 1973	20 June 1974	1 year, 0 days		
8	Bhimrao Jadhav	20 June 1974	23 June 1975	1 year, 3 days		
9	Yunus Zainuddin Shaikh	23 June 1975	19 June 1976	362 days		
10	Balchandra Shetty Alkunte	19 June 1976	19 June 1977	1 year, 0 days		
11	Vishwanath Bhogde	19 June 1977	19 June 1978	1 year, 0 days		
12	Sidram Malaya Adam	19 June 1978	19 June 1979	1 year, 0 days		
13	Bhagwan Sakharam Chavan	19 June 1979	16 June 1980	363 days		
14	Narayandas Rathi	16 June 1980	19 June 1981	1 year, 3 days		
Administrator's rule		20 June 1981	9 May 1985	3 years, 323 days	N. A.	
16	Puranchandra Punjal	9 May 1985	18 May 1986	1 year, 9 days	1985	
17	Kishore Deshpande	19 May 1986	19 May 1987	1 year, 0 days	1985	
18	Bandappa Munale	19 May 1987	20 May 1988	1 year, 1 day	1987	
19	Mahadev Mahindrakar	20 May 1988	19 May 1989	364 days	1987	
20	Dharmanna Sadul	19 May 1989	19 May 1990	1 year, 0 days	1987	
21	Muralidhar Patre	19 May 1990	29 March 1991	314 days	1987	
22	Umar Khan Nabi Khan Berea	29 March 1991	7 March 1992	344 days	1987	
23	Vishwanath Chakote	7 March 1992	20 March 1993	1 year, 13 days	1992	
24	Manohar Sapate	20 March 1993	20 March 1994	1 year, 0 days	1992	
25	Mahesh Kothe	20 March 1994	20 March 1995	1 year, 0 days	1992	
26	Subhash Patankar	20 March 1995	20 March 1996	1 year, 0 days	1992	
27	Khajadaud Yusuf Nalband	20 March 1996	6 March 1997	351 days	1992	
28	Shevantabai Pawar	6 March 1997	20 March 1998	1 year, 14 days	1997	
29	Janardhan Karampuri	20 March 1998	20 March 1999	1 year, 0 days	1997	
30	Sanjay Hemgaddi	20 March 1999	6 March 2002	2 years, 351 days	1997	
31	Nalini Chandele	6 March 2002	18 February 2005	2 years, 349 days	2002	
32	Vitthal Jadhav	19 February 2005	5 March 2007	2 years, 14 days	2002	
33	Aruna Vakse	6 March 2007	30 November 2009	2 years, 269 days	2007	
34	Arif Ismail Shaikh	1 December 2009	5 March 2012	2 years, 95 days	2007	
35	Alka Rathod	6 March 2012	5 September 2014	2 years, 183 days	2012	Indian National Congress
36	Sushila Abute	6 September 2014	7 March 2017	2 years, 182 days	2012	Indian National Congress
37	Shobha Banshetti	8 March 2017	3 December 2019	2 years, 270 days	2017	Bharatiya Janata Party
38	Srikanchana Yannam	4 December 2019	8 March 2022	2 years, 94 days	2017	Bharatiya Janata Party
Administrator's rule		8 March 2022	1 February 2026	4 years, 178 days	N. A.	
39	Vinayak Kondyal	6 February 2026	Present	208 days	2026	Bharatiya Janata Party

== Revenue sources ==
The following are the income sources for the corporation from the Central and State Government.

=== Revenue from taxes ===
Following is the tax-related revenue for the corporation.

- Property tax
- Profession tax
- Entertainment tax
- Grants from central and state governments like goods and services taxes
- Advertisement tax

=== Revenue from non-tax sources ===
Following is the non-tax related revenue for the corporation.

- Water usage charges
- Fees from documentation services
- Rent received from municipal property
- Funds from municipal bonds

== Responsibilities ==
The body is responsible for administering and providing various services to the city's citizens. Such services include:

1. Building and maintenance of roads, streets and flyovers
2. Garbage disposal and street cleanliness
3. Public municipal schools
4. Street lighting
5. Maintenance of parks and open spaces
6. Urban development and city planning of new areas
7. Registering of births and deaths
8. Health & Sanitation

SMC co-ordinates with various other government organizations like:

- Solapur Traffic Police
- Solapur City Police
- DM & Collector Office

etc. for delivering these basic urban services.

== Departments ==
Following are the departments in SMC

- Town planning department
- Building permission department
- Food Licensing department
- Women & Child welfare department
- Solapur Municipal Transport (SMC) department
- Health department
- Electricity department

== Committees ==
SMC elected body which presides over administration through committees appointed and consisting the corporators/councillors of the house.

Following is the list of committees

- Standing Committee
- Ward Committees
- Law Committee
- City Development Committee
- Women and Child Welfare Committee
- Sports Committee

Standing Committee Members – Solapur Municipal Corporation (2026)
No.	Name	Party
1	Bizzu Pradhane	Bharatiya Janata Party (BJP)
2	Satish Sirsilla	Bharatiya Janata Party (BJP)
3	Ranjita Chakote	Bharatiya Janata Party (BJP)
4	Avinash Patil	Bharatiya Janata Party (BJP)
5	Ganesh Wankar	Bharatiya Janata Party (BJP)
6	Bharatsingh Badurwale	Bharatiya Janata Party (BJP)
7	Satyanarayan Gurram	Bharatiya Janata Party (BJP)
8	Ashwini Chavan	Bharatiya Janata Party (BJP)
9	Sangita Jadhav	Bharatiya Janata Party (BJP)
10	Jaykumar Mane	Bharatiya Janata Party (BJP)
11	Shivaji Vaghmode	Bharatiya Janata Party (BJP)
12	Kalpana Kadam	Bharatiya Janata Party (BJP)
13	Rajkumar Patil	Bharatiya Janata Party (BJP)
14	Amar Pudale	Bharatiya Janata Party (BJP)
15	Amol Shinde	Shiv Sena
16	Azhar Hundekari	All India Majlis-e-Ittehadul Muslimeen (AIMIM)

== Services ==
Solapur Municipal Corporation perceives its role as the principal facilitator and provider of services as detailed below to provide a better quality of life.

- Property tax payment
- Temporary hording service
- Property tax concession
- Property card and daftari hukum
- Property tax services
- Licence services
- PMAY
- Ramai Awas Yojna
- Hutatma smruti mandir booking
- Laser show booking
- Cricket ground booking
- Hording services
- Marriage registration certificate
- New drainage connection
- Septic tank cleaning
- Disability empowerment scheme
- Fire NOC
- Ambulance booking
- Ghanta gadi service
- Pay gala rent
- Biomedical waste service
- Jalsuvidha
- Bhumi malmatta services
- Tree cutting application
- PMAY 2.0

== Election ==
Solapur is one of the most important municipalities in western Maharashtra. Solapur Metropolitan Municipal ward number one had four wards in 2017. However, in 2022, according to the new structure, the division number is now divided into three wards. So a ward has been reduced.

The following are the total population in the municipal elections in 2017, and the caste classification of the total population was as follows.

- Total population 24677
- Scheduled Castes 9010
- Scheduled Tribes 398

solapur corporation recent elections held on 2026

== Party Composition ==
S.No.	Party Name	Party flag or symbol	Alliance	Number of Corporators	
01	Bharatiya Janata Party (BJP)		NDA	87	87 / 102
02	Shiv Sena		NDA	04	4 / 102
03	All India Majlis-e-Ittehadul Muslimeen (AIMIM)			08	8 / 102
04	Nationalist Congress Party (NCP)		NDA	01	1 / 102
05	Indian National Congress (INC)		MVA	02	2 / 102

== Election results ==
=== 2026 results ===
Party	Seats	+/-
Bharatiya Janata Party (BJP)	87	▲38
Shiv Sena (SHS)	04	▼17
Indian National Congress (INC)	02	▼12
All India Majlis-e-Ittehadul Muslimeen (AIMIM)	08	▼01
Nationalist Congress Party (NCP)	01	▼03
Others	00	▼05
Total	102	
Source :

=== 2017 results ===
Party	Seats	+/-
Bharatiya Janata Party (BJP)	49	▲24
Shiv Sena (SHS)	21	▲13
Indian National Congress (INC)	14	▼31
All India Majlis-e-Ittehadul Muslimeen (AIMIM)	09	▲6
Nationalist Congress Party (NCP)	04	▼12
Others	05	
Total	102	
Source :

=== 2012 results ===
Party	Seats	+/-
Indian National Congress (INC)	45	
Bharatiya Janata Party (BJP)	25	
Shiv Sena (SHS)	08	
Nationalist Congress Party (NCP)	16	
All India Majlis-e-Ittehadul Muslimeen (AIMIM)	3	
Others	5	
Total	102	
Source :

== See also ==
- Indira Gandhi Stadium (Solapur)
- Solapur City Central Assembly constituency
- Solapur railway station
- Solapur Airport
