= Solapur Municipal Transport =

Public bus service in Maharashtra, India

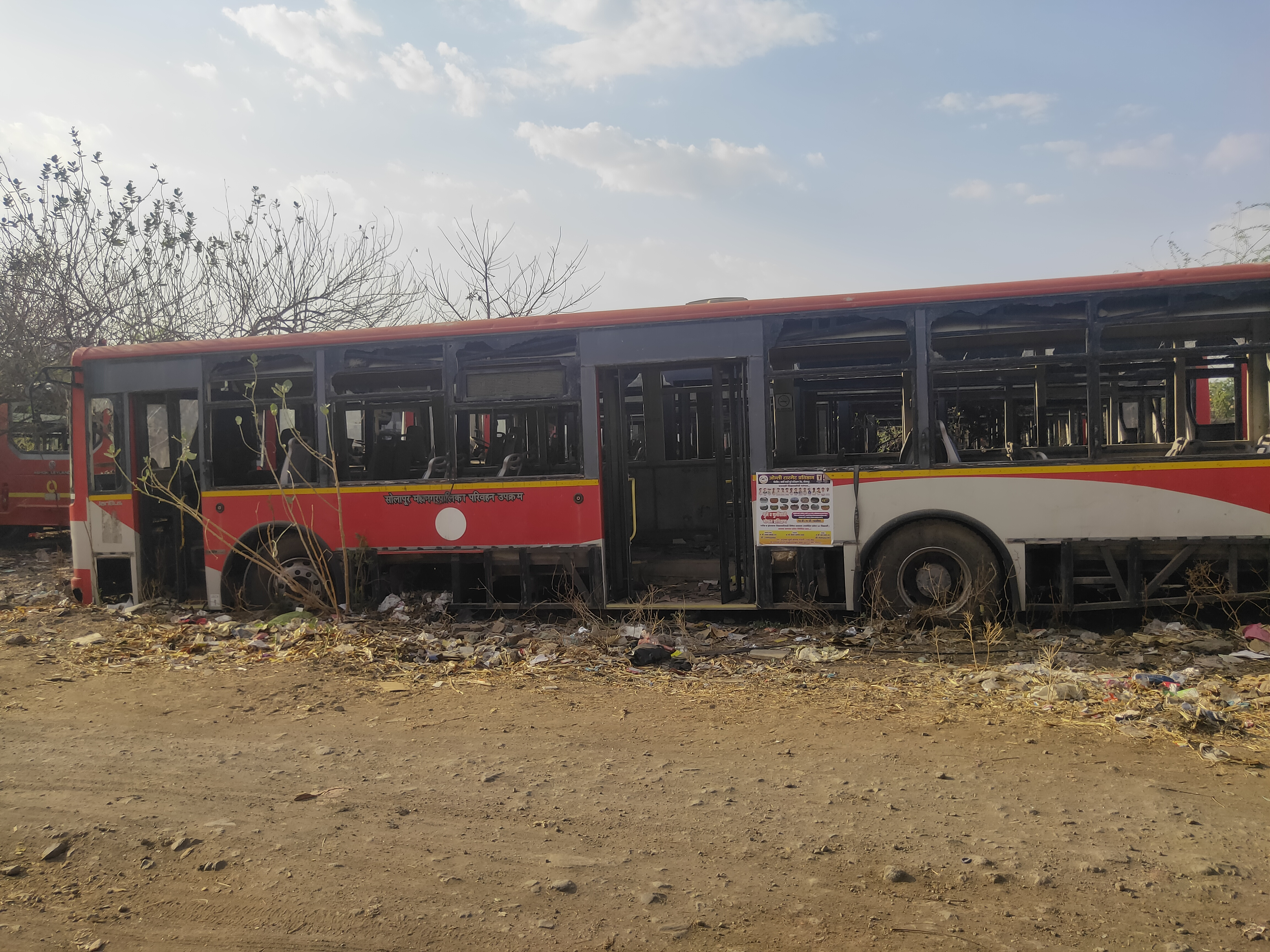
- SMT bus
- Parent: Solapur Municipal Corporation
- Founded: 10 January 1949
- Headquarters: Saat Rasta, Solapur, India
- Locale: Solapur Urban and Rural
- Service area: Solapur City & Solapur Suburban & Rural
- Service type: Bus
- Routes: 10
- Destinations: Railway Station, Chincholikati MIDC, Hattarsang Kudal, New Vidi Gharkul, Old Vidi Gharkul, Musti, etc.
- Hubs: Solapur Railway Station, Saat Rasta Depot, Rajendra Chowk Depot, Budhawar Peth Depot
- Depots: 3
- Fleet: 30
- Daily ridership: 3,000 (Average)
- Fuel type: Diesel

Solapur Municipal Transport (SMT) is the public bus service operated by the Solapur Municipal Corporation (SMC) in Solapur, Maharashtra, India. Established in April 1965, SMT provides urban public transportation within the city and its surrounding areas. The service operates under the provisions of the Bombay Provincial Municipal Corporations Act, 1949, which was later replaced by the Maharashtra Municipal Corporations Act, 2012.

As of March 2025, SMT has a fleet of 30 buses, but only 21 are operational due to maintenance issues and a shortage of drivers.

== History ==
Solapur's public transport system was initially managed by private companies before being taken over by the municipality. The first municipal bus service in the city was launched on 10 January 1949, under the Bombay Municipal Boroughs Act.

Over the years, SMT expanded its operations to cover major industrial and residential areas, including MIDC (Maharashtra Industrial Development Corporation) zones, Hotgi Road, Vijapur Road, and nearby villages.

At its peak, SMT had over 150 buses, but financial constraints and infrastructure challenges have led to a significant decline. The department's revenue is approximately ₹2 lakh per month, while expenditures reach ₹75 lakh, putting severe financial strain on the service.

== Routes ==
Solapur Municipal Transport - Bus Routes
Sr. No.	Route No.	Route Name	Via
1.	15 C	Railway Station to Sangdari	Market Yard, Boramani
2.	16 A	Railway Station to Godutai Gharkul	Shanti Chowk (Paani Taki), Sut Mill, Mallikarjun Nagar
3.	16 B	Railway Station to Godutai Gharkul	Shanti Chowk (Paani Taki), Sut Mill, Mallikarjun Nagar
4.	16 C	Railway Station to Godutai Gharkul	Shanti Chowk (Paani Taki), Sut Mill, Mallikarjun Nagar
5.	30 A	Railway Station to Godutai Gharkul	GP College, WIT College, Gentyal, 70ft road, Akashwani Kendra, Nilam Nagar, Vijay Nagar
6.	30 B	Railway Station to Godutai Gharkul	GP College, WIT College, Gentyal, 70ft road, Akashwani Kendra, Nilam Nagar, Vijay Nagar
7.	43 A	Railway Station to Godutai and Ray-Nagar	Market Yard
8.	55 A	Kontam Chowk to Kasegaon	Hagalur Ule
9.	55 B	Kontam Chowk to Kasegaon	Hagalur Ule
10.	57 B	Railway Station to Desai Nagar	70 Feet Road
11.	64	Shivaji Chowk to Chapalgaon	Rangbhavan, Kumbhari
12.	70	Railway Station to Musti	Market Yard
13.	72 D	Shivaji Chowk to Vadgaon	Mardi
14.	73 B	Shivaji Chowk to Mandrup	13 Mile
15.	73 D	Shivaji Chowk to Devkurli, Shivaji Chowk to Mandrup	13 Mile
16.	73 F	Shivaji Chowk to Vinchur	13 Mile, Mandrup
17.	78	Shivaji Chowk to Bolkote	11 Mile, Honmuragi
18.	91	Shivaji Chowk to Hattarsang Kudal	13 Mile, Nandani
19.	92	Shivaji Chowk to Jeur	Hotgi, Ingalgi
20.	94	Shivaji Chowk to Kandalgaon	Vangi, Mangoli
21.	95 B	Shivaji Chowk to Panmangrul	Hotgi Auj
22.	95 D	Shivaji Chowk to Panmangrul	Hotgi Auj

== Future Development ==
Under the central government's 'PM E-Bus Seva Yojana', Solapur is set to receive 100 electric buses to enhance its public transport network. This initiative aims to promote eco-friendly transportation and modernize SMT's operations. At the time of the report, only 21 buses were operational, with many being inactive during afternoons due to a shortage of drivers.

To support this transition, charging stations have been identified at strategic locations in the city. However, staff shortages continue to affect SMT's daily operations, with many buses remaining inactive, particularly in the afternoons due to a lack of available drivers.

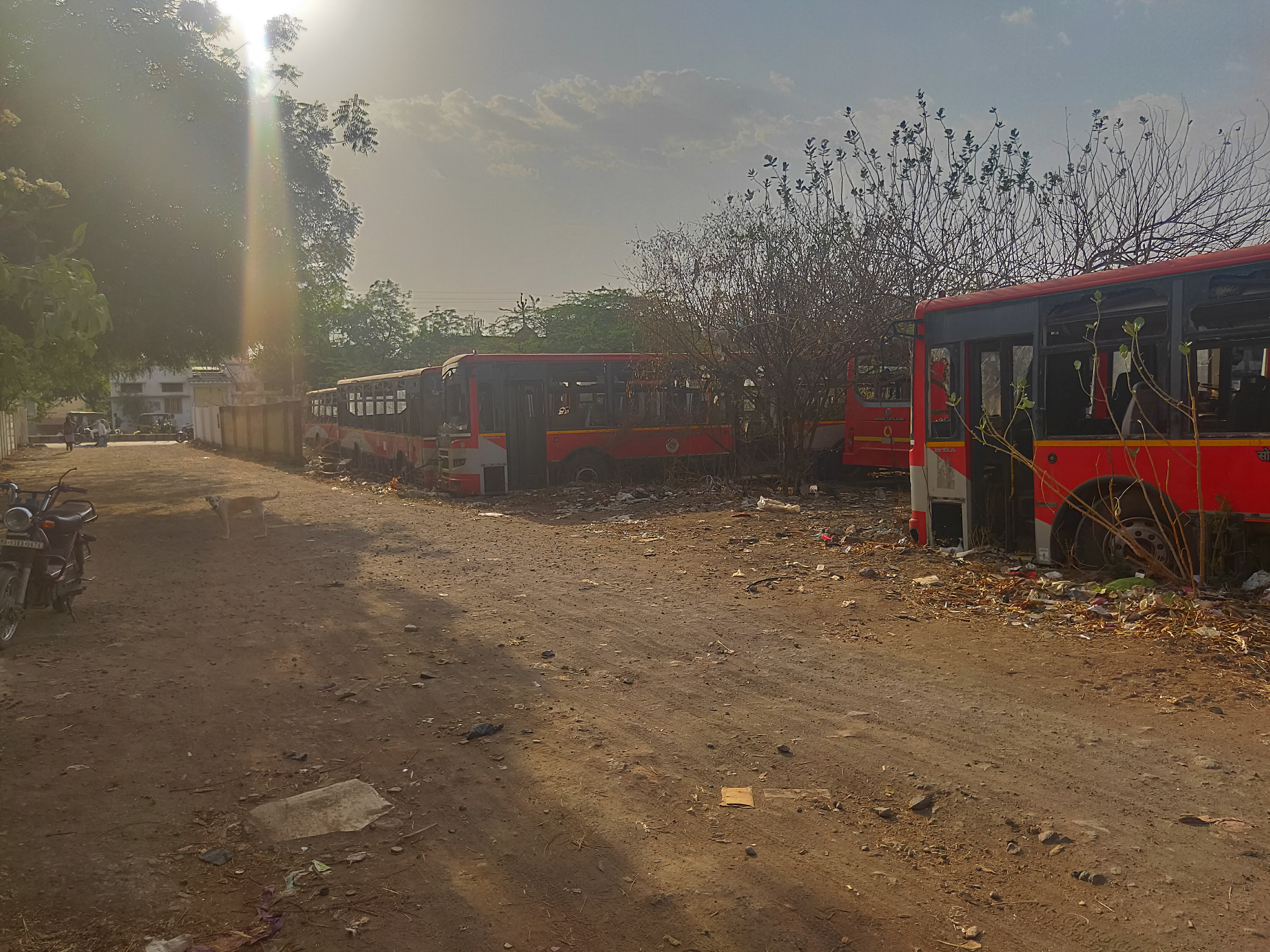
Solapur Municipal Transport buses

== See also ==
- Solapur Municipal Corporation
- Public Transport in Maharashtra
- Maharashtra State Road Transport Corporation (MSRTC)
