= Solapur Municipal Corporation elections =

Municipal elections for Solapur Municipal Corporation

Solapur Municipal Corporation Elections

102 seats in Solapur Municipal Corporation

Solapur Municipal Corporation Election
- 15 January 2026

All 102 seats in Solapur Municipal Corporation 52 seats needed for a majority
| | First party | Second party | Third party |
|---|---|---|---|
| Party | BJP | AIMIM | SS |
| Last election | 49 | 9 | 21 |
| Seats won | 87 | 8 | 4 |
| Seat change | ▲38 | ▼1 | ▼17 |
| | Fourth party | Fifth party |
| Party | INC | NCP |
| Last election | 14 | 4 |
| Seats won | 2 | 1 |
| Seat change | ▼12 | ▼3 |
SMC majority before election
No overall control
Elected SMC majority
BJP

The Solapur Municipal Corporation elections are held periodically to elect councillors to the Solapur Municipal Corporation (SMC) in the Indian state of Maharashtra. These elections determine the composition of the municipal body responsible for urban governance, civic infrastructure, and public services in Solapur.

Elections to the corporation are conducted by the State Election Commission of Maharashtra under the provisions of the Maharashtra Municipal Corporation Act.

== Electoral system ==
The elections are conducted using the first-past-the-post voting system. Councillors are elected from multi-member wards, with seats reserved for women, Scheduled Castes, and Scheduled Tribes as per constitutional and state election rules.

== Overview of elections ==
| Election year | Total seats | Wards | Notes |
|---|---|---|---|
| 2017 | 102 | 26 | See detailed results below |
| 2026 | 102 | 26 | See detailed results below |

== 2017 Solapur Municipal Corporation election ==
The 2017 election to the Solapur Municipal Corporation elected councillors to all 102 seats. Party-wise results from the election are referenced in later comparative reports published during the 2026 civic polls.

=== Party-wise results (2017) ===
| Party | Seats won |
|---|---|
| Bharatiya Janata Party | 49 |
| Shiv Sena | 21 |
| Indian National Congress | 14 |
| All India Majlis-e-Ittehadul Muslimeen | 9 |
| Nationalist Congress Party | 4 |
| Others | 5 |

=== Wards ===
Political Representatives
| Ward No. | Seat | Councillor / Corporator Name | Political Party | Alliance |
|---|---|---|---|---|
| 1 | A | Gautam Madhukar Kasabe | Bharatiya Janata Party | NDA |
| 1 | B | Rajashri Ambadas Kanke | Bharatiya Janata Party | NDA |
| 1 | C | Poonam Prabhakar Kashid | Bharatiya Janata Party | NDA |
| 1 | D | Avinash Mahadev Patil | Bharatiya Janata Party | NDA |
| 2 | A | Narayan Dattatray Bansode | Bharatiya Janata Party | NDA |
| 2 | B | Kalpana Gyaneshwar Karbhari | Bharatiya Janata Party | NDA |
| 2 | C | Shalan Shankar Shinde | Bharatiya Janata Party | NDA |
| 2 | D | Kiran Vijaykumar Deshmukh | Bharatiya Janata Party | NDA |
| 3 | A | Rajkumar Patil | Bharatiya Janata Party | NDA |
| 3 | B | Swati Dattatray Badgu | Bharatiya Janata Party | NDA |
| 3 | C | Ranjita Sakalesh Chakote | Bharatiya Janata Party | NDA |
| 3 | D | Sanjay Basappa Koli | Bharatiya Janata Party | NDA |
| 4 | A | Vandana Ajit Gaikwad | Bharatiya Janata Party | NDA |
| 4 | B | Vinayak Fakir Vitkar | Bharatiya Janata Party | NDA |
| 4 | C | Aishwarya Ganesh Sakhare | Bharatiya Janata Party | NDA |
| 4 | D | Anant Gyaneshwar Jadhav | Bharatiya Janata Party | NDA |
| 5 | A | Samadhan Revansiddh Awale | Bharatiya Janata Party | NDA |
| 5 | B | Alka Anand Bhavar | Bharatiya Janata Party | NDA |
| 5 | C | Mandakini Todkari | Bharatiya Janata Party | NDA |
| 5 | D | Bijju Sangappa Pradhane | Bharatiya Janata Party | NDA |
| 6 | A | Sonali Arjun Gaikwad | Bharatiya Janata Party | NDA |
| 6 | B | Sunil Pandurang Khatke | Bharatiya Janata Party | NDA |
| 6 | C | Mrunmayee Mahadev Gawali | Bharatiya Janata Party | NDA |
| 6 | D | Ganesh Prakash Wankar | Bharatiya Janata Party | NDA |
| 7 | A | Aniket Pise | Shiv Sena (Eknath Shinde) | NDA |
| 7 | B | Shraddha Kiran Pawar | Bharatiya Janata Party | NDA |
| 7 | C | Manorama Sapate | Shiv Sena (Eknath Shinde) | NDA |
| 7 | D | Amol Shinde | Shiv Sena (Eknath Shinde) | NDA |
| 8 | A | Amar Marutirao Pudale | Bharatiya Janata Party | NDA |
| 8 | B | Geeta Govind Gawai | Bharatiya Janata Party | NDA |
| 8 | C | Babita Anantkumar Dhumma | Bharatiya Janata Party | NDA |
| 8 | D | Gaurishankar (Praveen) Kashinath Dargopattil | Bharatiya Janata Party | NDA |
| 9 | A | Shekhar Pandurang Ige | Bharatiya Janata Party | NDA |
| 9 | B | Kadambari Prakash Manjeli | Bharatiya Janata Party | NDA |
| 9 | C | Pooja Shrikant Wadekar | Bharatiya Janata Party | NDA |
| 9 | D | Meghnath Dattatray Yemul | Bharatiya Janata Party | NDA |
| 10 | A | Ujwala Avinash Dasari | Bharatiya Janata Party | NDA |
| 10 | B | Deepika Vasudev Yaldandi | Bharatiya Janata Party | NDA |
| 10 | C | Satish Nagnath Shirasilla | Bharatiya Janata Party | NDA |
| 10 | D | Prathamesh Mahesh Kothe | Bharatiya Janata Party | NDA |
| 11 | A | Yuvraj Kondiba Sarvade | Bharatiya Janata Party | NDA |
| 11 | B | Shardabai Vijay Rampure | Bharatiya Janata Party | NDA |
| 11 | C | Meenakshi Dattatray Kadganche | Bharatiya Janata Party | NDA |
| 11 | D | Ajay Chandrakant Ponnam | Bharatiya Janata Party | NDA |
| 12 | A | Siddheshwar Ramlu Kamtam | Bharatiya Janata Party | NDA |
| 12 | B | Sarika Siddharam Khajurgi | Bharatiya Janata Party | NDA |
| 12 | C | Archana Raju Vadnal | Bharatiya Janata Party | NDA |
| 12 | D | Vinayak Ramkrishna Kondyal | Bharatiya Janata Party | NDA |
| 13 | A | Sunita Sunil Kamathi | Bharatiya Janata Party | NDA |
| 13 | B | Ambika Hanmantu Chaugule | Bharatiya Janata Party | NDA |
| 13 | C | Satyanarayan Ramayya Gurram | Bharatiya Janata Party | NDA |
| 13 | D | Vijay Bhoomayya Chippa | Bharatiya Janata Party | NDA |
| 14 | A | Akila Bhagnagari | AIMIM | Others |
| 14 | B | Asif Ahmad Sheikh | AIMIM | Others |
| 14 | C | Wahidabano Sheikh | AIMIM | Others |
| 14 | D | Taufiq Hatture | AIMIM | Others |
| 15 | A | Shridevi John Fulare | Bharatiya Janata Party | NDA |
| 15 | B | Vijaya Nagesh Kharat | Bharatiya Janata Party | NDA |
| 15 | C | Vinod Dharma Bhosale | Bharatiya Janata Party | NDA |
| 15 | D | Chetan Narote | Indian National Congress | MVA |
| 16 | A | Narsing Asade | Indian National Congress | MVA |
| 16 | B | Shweta Prashant Kharat | Bharatiya Janata Party | NDA |
| 16 | C | Kalpana Santosh Kadam | Bharatiya Janata Party | NDA |
| 16 | D | Priyadarshan Sathe | Shiv Sena (Eknath Shinde) | NDA |
| 17 | A | Nirmala Harish Jangam | Bharatiya Janata Party | NDA |
| 17 | B | Bharatsingh Vitthalsingh Badurwale | Bharatiya Janata Party | NDA |
| 17 | C | Jugnubai Ambevale | Bharatiya Janata Party | NDA |
| 17 | D | Ravi Shankarsing Kayyavale | Bharatiya Janata Party | NDA |
| 18 | A | Shrikanchana Ramesh Yennam | Bharatiya Janata Party | NDA |
| 18 | B | Rajshri Shivshankar Dodamani | Bharatiya Janata Party | NDA |
| 18 | C | Prashant Anil Palli | Bharatiya Janata Party | NDA |
| 18 | D | Shivanand Sidramappa Patil | Bharatiya Janata Party | NDA |
| 19 | A | Kavita Hiralal Gajjam | Bharatiya Janata Party | NDA |
| 19 | B | Venkatesh Chandrayya Kondi | Bharatiya Janata Party | NDA |
| 19 | C | Kalavati Anand Gadge | Bharatiya Janata Party | NDA |
| 19 | D | Basavaraj Ramanna Kenganalkar | Bharatiya Janata Party | NDA |
| 20 | A | Safiya Choudhary | AIMIM | Others |
| 20 | B | Anisa Mogal | AIMIM | Others |
| 20 | C | Azhar Hundekari | AIMIM | Others |
| 20 | D | Azharoddin Jahagirdar | AIMIM | Others |
| 21 | A | Sangita Shivaji Jadhav | Bharatiya Janata Party | NDA |
| 21 | B | Shivaji Uttamrao Waghmode | Bharatiya Janata Party | NDA |
| 21 | C | Manjeri Sanket Killedar | Bharatiya Janata Party | NDA |
| 21 | D | Satvik Prashant Badwe | Bharatiya Janata Party | NDA |
| 22 | A | Dattatray Margu Nadgiri | Bharatiya Janata Party | NDA |
| 22 | B | Ambika Nagesh Gaikwad | Bharatiya Janata Party | NDA |
| 22 | C | Chaitrali Shivraj Gaikwad | Bharatiya Janata Party | NDA |
| 22 | D | Kisan Lakshman Jadhav | Bharatiya Janata Party | NDA |
| 23 | A | Satyajit Subodh Waghmode | Bharatiya Janata Party | NDA |
| 23 | B | Aarti Akshay Wakase | Bharatiya Janata Party | NDA |
| 23 | C | Gnyaneshwari Mahesh Devkar | Bharatiya Janata Party | NDA |
| 23 | D | Rajshekhar Mallikarjun Patil | Bharatiya Janata Party | NDA |
| 24 | A | Madhusudan Dinesh Jangam | Bharatiya Janata Party | NDA |
| 24 | B | Vanita Santosh Patil | Bharatiya Janata Party | NDA |
| 24 | C | Ashwini Mohan Chavan | Bharatiya Janata Party | NDA |
| 24 | D | Narendra Govind Kale | Bharatiya Janata Party | NDA |
| 25 | A | Suman Jeevan Chabukswar | Bharatiya Janata Party | NDA |
| 25 | B | Vaibhav Hatture | Nationalist Congress Party | NDA |
| 25 | C | Vaishali Anil Bhopale | Bharatiya Janata Party | NDA |
| 26 | A | Sangita Shankar Jadhav | Bharatiya Janata Party | NDA |
| 26 | B | Deepak Vijay Jamadar | Bharatiya Janata Party | NDA |
| 26 | C | Jaykumar Brahmadev Mane | Bharatiya Janata Party | NDA |

== 2026 Solapur Municipal Corporation election ==
The 2026 Solapur Municipal Corporation election was held on 15 January 2026, with counting and declaration of results on 16 January 2026.

A total of 102 seats across 26 wards were contested.

=== Alliance or Party-wise results (2026) ===
Source
| Alliance/ Party | | | Popular vote | | | Seats | | | SR |
| Alliance/ Party | | | Votes | % | ±pp | Contested | Won | +/− | % |
|---|---|---|---|---|---|---|---|---|---|
| BJP | | | TBA | TBA | | TBA | 87 | ▲38 | |
| Yuti Alliance | | SHS | TBA | TBA | | TBA | 4 | ▼17 | |
| Yuti Alliance | | NCP | TBA | TBA | | TBA | 1 | ▼3 | |
| Yuti Alliance | Total | | TBA | TBA | | TBA | 5 | | |
| Maha Vikas Aghadi (MVA) | | INC | TBA | TBA | | TBA | 2 | ▼12 | |
| Maha Vikas Aghadi (MVA) | | SS(UBT) | TBA | TBA | | TBA | 0 | New entry | |
| Maha Vikas Aghadi (MVA) | | NCP-SP | TBA | TBA | | TBA | 0 | New entry | |
| Maha Vikas Aghadi (MVA) | | CPI(M) | TBA | TBA | | TBA | 0 | Steady | |
| Total | TBA | TBA | | TBA | 2 | | | | |
| AIMIM | | | TBA | TBA | | TBA | 8 | ▲6 | |
| VBA | | | TBA | TBA | | TBA | 0 | Steady | |
| Total | | | TBA | 100% | — | | 102 | — | — |

=== Wards ===
Political Representatives
| Ward No. | Seat | Councillor/ Corporator Name | Political Party | Alliance |
|---|---|---|---|---|
| 1 | A | Gautam Madhukar Kasabe | Bharatiya Janata Party | |
| 1 | B | Rajashri Ambadas Kanke | Bharatiya Janata Party | |
| 1 | C | Poonam Prabhakar Kashid | Bharatiya Janata Party | |
| 1 | D | Avinash Mahadev Patil | Bharatiya Janata Party | |
| 2 | A | Narayan Dattatray Bansode | Bharatiya Janata Party | |
| 2 | B | Kalpana Gyaneshwar Karbhari | Bharatiya Janata Party | |
| 2 | C | Shalan Shankar Shinde | Bharatiya Janata Party | |
| 2 | D | Kiran Vijaykumar Deshmukh | Bharatiya Janata Party | |
| 3 | A | Rajkumar Patil | Bharatiya Janata Party | |
| 3 | B | Swati Dattatray Badgu | Bharatiya Janata Party | |
| 3 | C | Ranjita Sakalesh Chakote | Bharatiya Janata Party | |
| 3 | D | Sanjay Basappa Koli | Bharatiya Janata Party | |
| 4 | A | Vandana Ajit Gaikwad | Bharatiya Janata Party | |
| 4 | B | Vinayak Fakir Vitkar | Bharatiya Janata Party | |
| 4 | C | Aishwarya Ganesh Sakhare | Bharatiya Janata Party | |
| 4 | D | Anant Gyaneshwar Jadhav | Bharatiya Janata Party | |
| 5 | A | Samadhan Revansiddh Awale | Bharatiya Janata Party | |
| 5 | B | Alka Anand Bhavar | Bharatiya Janata Party | |
| 5 | C | Mandakini Todkari | Bharatiya Janata Party | |
| 5 | D | Bijju Sangappa Pradhane | Bharatiya Janata Party | |
| 6 | A | Sonali Arjun Gaikwad | Bharatiya Janata Party | |
| 6 | B | Sunil Pandurang Khatke | Bharatiya Janata Party | |
| 6 | C | Mrunmayee Mahadev Gawali | Bharatiya Janata Party | |
| 6 | D | Ganesh Prakash Wankar | Bharatiya Janata Party | |
| 7 | A | Aniket Pise | Shiv Sena (Eknath Shinde) | Yuti Alliance |
| 7 | B | Shraddha Kiran Pawar | Bharatiya Janata Party | |
| 7 | C | Manorama Sapate | Shiv Sena (Eknath Shinde) | Yuti Alliance |
| 7 | D | Amol Shinde | Shiv Sena (Eknath Shinde) | Yuti Alliance |
| 8 | A | Amar Marutirao Pudale | Bharatiya Janata Party | |
| 8 | B | Geeta Govind Gawai | Bharatiya Janata Party | |
| 8 | C | Babita Anantkumar Dhumma | Bharatiya Janata Party | |
| 8 | D | Gaurishankar (Praveen) Kashinath Dargopattil | Bharatiya Janata Party | |
| 9 | A | Shekhar Pandurang Ige | Bharatiya Janata Party | |
| 9 | B | Kadambari Prakash Manjeli | Bharatiya Janata Party | |
| 9 | C | Pooja Shrikant Wadekar | Bharatiya Janata Party | |
| 9 | D | Meghnath Dattatray Yemul | Bharatiya Janata Party | |
| 10 | A | Ujwala Avinash Dasari | Bharatiya Janata Party | |
| 10 | B | Deepika Vasudev Yaldandi | Bharatiya Janata Party | |
| 10 | C | Satish Nagnath Shirasilla | Bharatiya Janata Party | |
| 10 | D | Prathamesh Mahesh Kothe | Bharatiya Janata Party | |
| 11 | A | Yuvraj Kondiba Sarvade | Bharatiya Janata Party | |
| 11 | B | Shardabai Vijay Rampure | Bharatiya Janata Party | |
| 11 | C | Meenakshi Dattatray Kadganche | Bharatiya Janata Party | |
| 11 | D | Ajay Chandrakant Ponnam | Bharatiya Janata Party | |
| 12 | A | Siddheshwar Ramlu Kamtam | Bharatiya Janata Party | |
| 12 | B | Sarika Siddharam Khajurgi | Bharatiya Janata Party | |
| 12 | C | Archana Raju Vadnal | Bharatiya Janata Party | |
| 12 | D | Vinayak Ramkrishna Kondyal | Bharatiya Janata Party | |
| 13 | A | Sunita Sunil Kamathi | Bharatiya Janata Party | |
| 13 | B | Ambika Hanmantu Chaugule | Bharatiya Janata Party | |
| 13 | C | Satyanarayan Ramayya Gurram | Bharatiya Janata Party | |
| 13 | D | Vijay Bhoomayya Chippa | Bharatiya Janata Party | |
| 14 | A | Akila Bhagnagari | AIMIM | Others |
| 14 | B | Asif Ahmad Sheikh | AIMIM | Others |
| 14 | C | Wahidabano Sheikh | AIMIM | Others |
| 14 | D | Taufiq Hatture | AIMIM | Others |
| 15 | A | Shridevi John Fulare | Bharatiya Janata Party | |
| 15 | B | Vijaya Nagesh Kharat | Bharatiya Janata Party | |
| 15 | C | Vinod Dharma Bhosale | Bharatiya Janata Party | |
| 15 | D | Chetan Narote | Indian National Congress | Maha Vikas Aghadi |
| 16 | A | Narsing Asade | Indian National Congress | Maha Vikas Aghadi |
| 16 | B | Shweta Prashant Kharat | Bharatiya Janata Party | |
| 16 | C | Kalpana Santosh Kadam | Bharatiya Janata Party | |
| 16 | D | Priyadarshan Sathe | Shiv Sena (Eknath Shinde) | Yuti Alliance |
| 17 | A | Nirmala Harish Jangam | Bharatiya Janata Party | |
| 17 | B | Bharatsingh Vitthalsingh Badurwale | Bharatiya Janata Party | |
| 17 | C | Jugnubai Ambevale | Bharatiya Janata Party | |
| 17 | D | Ravi Shankarsing Kayyavale | Bharatiya Janata Party | |
| 18 | A | Shrikanchana Ramesh Yennam | Bharatiya Janata Party | |
| 18 | B | Rajshri Shivshankar Dodamani | Bharatiya Janata Party | |
| 18 | C | Prashant Anil Palli | Bharatiya Janata Party | |
| 18 | D | Shivanand Sidramappa Patil | Bharatiya Janata Party | |
| 19 | A | Kavita Hiralal Gajjam | Bharatiya Janata Party | |
| 19 | B | Venkatesh Chandrayya Kondi | Bharatiya Janata Party | |
| 19 | C | Kalavati Anand Gadge | Bharatiya Janata Party | |
| 19 | D | Basavaraj Ramanna Kenganalkar | Bharatiya Janata Party | |
| 20 | A | Safiya Choudhary | AIMIM | Others |
| 20 | B | Anisa Mogal | AIMIM | Others |
| 20 | C | Azhar Hundekari | AIMIM | Others |
| 20 | D | Azharoddin Jahagirdar | AIMIM | Others |
| 21 | A | Sangita Shivaji Jadhav | Bharatiya Janata Party | |
| 21 | B | Shivaji Uttamrao Waghmode | Bharatiya Janata Party | |
| 21 | C | Manjeri Sanket Killedar | Bharatiya Janata Party | |
| 21 | D | Satvik Prashant Badwe | Bharatiya Janata Party | |
| 22 | A | Dattatray Margu Nadgiri | Bharatiya Janata Party | |
| 22 | B | Ambika Nagesh Gaikwad | Bharatiya Janata Party | |
| 22 | C | Chaitrali Shivraj Gaikwad | Bharatiya Janata Party | |
| 22 | D | Kisan Lakshman Jadhav | Bharatiya Janata Party | |
| 23 | A | Satyajit Subodh Waghmode | Bharatiya Janata Party | |
| 23 | B | Aarti Akshay Wakase | Bharatiya Janata Party | |
| 23 | C | Gnyaneshwari Mahesh Devkar | Bharatiya Janata Party | |
| 23 | D | Rajshekhar Mallikarjun Patil | Bharatiya Janata Party | |
| 24 | A | Madhusudan Dinesh Jangam | Bharatiya Janata Party | |
| 24 | B | Vanita Santosh Patil | Bharatiya Janata Party | |
| 24 | C | Ashwini Mohan Chavan | Bharatiya Janata Party | |
| 24 | D | Narendra Govind Kale | Bharatiya Janata Party | |
| 25 | A | Suman Jeevan Chabukswar | Bharatiya Janata Party | |
| 25 | B | Vaibhav Hatture | Nationalist Congress Party | Yuti Alliance |
| 25 | C | Vaishali Anil Bhopale | Bharatiya Janata Party | |
| 26 | A | Sangita Shankar Jadhav | Bharatiya Janata Party | |
| 26 | B | Deepak Vijay Jamadar | Bharatiya Janata Party | |
| 26 | C | Jaykumar Brahmadev Mane | Bharatiya Janata Party | |

=== Ward-wise and notable outcomes ===
- Detailed ward-wise winners and runners-up lists were published during counting by national and regional media outlets.
- BJP candidates dominated the results, winning a majority of wards across the city.
- Several prominent local leaders, including former mayors, were defeated in the election.
- BJP leader Shalan Shinde won from Ward 2 despite being incarcerated in a murder case, drawing national attention.
- Reports of alleged cash distribution during the election campaign were registered by police.

== Aftermath ==
The election resulted in a decisive victory for the Bharatiya Janata Party, consolidating its control over the Solapur Municipal Corporation for the 2026–2031 term. The results were widely described by media outlets as a major political shift in Solapur’s civic governance.

== Party performance comparison ==
| Party | 2017 | 2026 |
|---|---|---|
| Bharatiya Janata Party | 49 | 87 |
| Shiv Sena | 21 | 4 |
| Indian National Congress | 14 | 2 |
| All India Majlis-e-Ittehadul Muslimeen | 9 | 8 |
| Nationalist Congress Party | 4 | 1 |

== See also ==
- Solapur Municipal Corporation
- Municipal elections in Maharashtra
- 2026 Maharashtra local body elections
