= Uttarakhand football team =

Uttarakhand men's football team

Uttarakhand
- Full name: Uttarakhand football team
- Founded: 2004; 22 years ago
- Ground: Indira Gandhi International Sports Stadium
- Capacity: 25,000
- Owner: Uttarakhand State Football Association
- Coach: Jatin Singh Bisht
- League: Santosh Trophy
- 2024–25: Group Stage
Home colours	Away colours

The Uttarakhand football team is an Indian football team representing Uttarakhand in the Santosh Trophy.

== Current squad ==
The following 22 players were called up for the 2022–23 Santosh Trophy.

Note: Flags indicate national team as defined under FIFA eligibility rules; some limited exceptions apply. Players may hold more than one non-FIFA nationality.

No.	Pos.	Nation	Player
1	GK	IND	Virander Pandey
2	DF	IND	Ajay Bisht
3	Df	IND	Amit Negi
4	DF	IND	Shailendra Singh Negi
5	DF	IND	Bharat Mehra
6	MF	IND	Badal Rawat
8	MF	IND	Ishant Dhasmana
19	MF	IND	Abhishek Rawat
9	FW	IND	Doli Nomuk
10	FW	IND	Sucharu Dabral
11	FW	IND	Deepak Singh Rawat

No.	Pos.	Nation	Player
—		IND	Vishal Sona
—		IND	Saurabh Kumar
—		IND	Sarthak Singh
—		IND	Ajay Singh
—		IND	Abhinav Singh Negi
—		IND	Rishabh Adhikari
—		IND	Faizal Ali
20	FW	IND	Rishabh Aneja
—		IND	Rakshit Chandra
22	GK	IND	Rohit Kumar
—		IND	Somya Tamta

== Competitive record ==
Santosh Trophy
Season	Group	Matches	Wins	Draws	Losses	Goals For	Goals Against	Goal Difference	Performance
2004–05	–	3	1	0	2	3	6	–3	Qualification Stage
2005–06	–	2	1	0	1	2	3	–1	Qualification Stage
2006–07	–	3	0	1	2	2	4	–2	Qualification Stage
2007–08	–	2	0	0	2	2	6	–4	Qualification Stage
2008–09	–	2	0	1	1	2	11	–9	Qualification Stage
2009–10	–	3	1	0	2	5	10	–5	Qualification Stage
2010–11	–	2	1	0	1	1	3	–2	Qualification Stage
2011–12	–	2	0	0	2	2	10	–8	Qualification Stage
2012–13	–	4	1	1	2	7	6	+1	Qualification Stage
2013–14	Group A	7	2	1	4	8	15	–7	Group Stage
2014–15	–	3	2	0	1	5	8	–3	Qualification Stage
2015–16	–	3	1	0	2	3	4	–1	Qualification Stage
2016–17	–	3	1	0	2	1	0	+1	Qualification Stage
2017–18	–	3	1	0	2	3	6	–3	Qualification Stage
2018–19	–	3	0	0	3	3	9	–6	Qualification Stage
2019–20	–	3	1	0	2	1	5	–4	Qualification Stage
2020–21	Season cancelled due to COVID-19 pandemic								
2021–22	–	3	0	0	3	1	28	–27	Qualification Stage
2022–23	Group I	5	1	1	3	6	10	–4	Group Stage
2023–24	Group E	5	3	0	2	11	6	+5	Group Stage
2024–25	Group B	3	2	0	1	9	5	+4	Group Stage
2025–26	Group A	8	4	1	3	10	7	+3	Final Round
Total		72	23	6	43	87	162	–75	Win %: 31.94

== Honours ==
- National Games
  - Silver Medal (1): 2025

== See also ==
- India national football team
- Uttarakhand State Football Association
- Uttarakhand Super League
- Football in India
- Uttarakhand cricket team
