= 2012–13 Santosh Trophy qualification =

This article details the 2013 Santosh Trophy qualifiers.

== Format ==
The qualifiers will start from 1 February to 19 February 2013 and will consist of 27 teams.

== Qualification round 1 ==
=== Group A ===
Team	Pld	W	D	L	GF	GA	GD	Pts
Railways	2	1	1	0	2	1	+1	4
West Bengal	2	1	1	0	1	0	+1	4
Delhi	2	0	0	2	1	3	-2	0

=== Group B ===
Team	Pld	W	D	L	GF	GA	GD	Pts
Punjab	2	2	0	0	4	0	+4	6
Orissa	2	1	0	1	3	4	-1	3
Meghalaya	2	0	0	2	2	4	-2	0

=== Group C ===
Team	Pld	W	D	L	GF	GA	GD	Pts
Uttar Pradesh	2	1	1	0	3	2	+1	4
Maharashtra	2	0	2	0	3	3	0	2
Mizoram	2	0	1	1	1	2	-1	1

=== Group D ===
Team	Pld	W	D	L	GF	GA	GD	Pts
Goa	2	1	1	0	4	3	+1	4
Haryana	2	0	2	0	3	3	0	2
Chhattisgarh	2	0	1	1	2	3	-1	1

== Qualification round 2 ==
=== Group A ===
Team	Pld	W	D	L	GF	GA	GD	Pts
Jharkhand	3	2	1	0	9	4	+5	7
Chandigarh	3	2	1	0	7	3	+4	7
Nagaland	3	1	0	2	6	8	-2	3
Gujarat	3	0	0	3	3	10	-7	0

=== Group B ===
Team	Pld	W	D	L	GF	GA	GD	Pts
Karnataka	4	4	0	0	20	2	+18	12
Bihar	4	3	0	1	6	3	+3	9
Arunachal Pradesh	4	2	0	2	3	11	-8	6
Himachal Pradesh	4	1	1	2	7	9	-2	4
Daman and Diu	4	0	0	4	5	13	-8	0

=== Group C ===
Team	Pld	W	D	L	GF	GA	GD	Pts
Jammu and Kashmir	2	2	0	0	4	1	+3	6
Assam	2	1	0	1	4	1	+3	3
Rajasthan	2	0	0	2	1	7	-6	0

=== Group D ===
Team	Pld	W	D	L	GF	GA	GD	Pts
Madhya Pradesh	4	3	1	0	13	1	+12	10
Sikkim	4	2	2	0	11	4	+7	8
Uttarakhand	4	1	1	2	7	6	+1	4
Tripura	4	1	1	2	5	8	-3	4
Pondicherry	4	0	1	3	2	19	-17	1
