= Jharkhand Football Association =

State governing body of Football in Jharkhand

- Sport: Football
- Jurisdiction: Jharkhand
- Membership: 24 district associations
- Abbreviation: JFA
- Founded: 2000; 25 years ago
- Affiliation: All India Football Federation (AIFF)
- Headquarters: Giridih
- President: Mithlesh Kumar Thakur
- Secretary: Ghulam Rabbani

The Jharkhand Football Association (JFA) is the football governing body in the state of Jharkhand in India. It is affiliated with the All India Football Federation, the national governing body. It sends state teams for Santosh Trophy and Rajmata Jijabai Trophy.

== State teams ==
=== Men ===
- Jharkhand football team
- Jharkhand under-20 football team
- Jharkhand under-15 football team
- Jharkhand under-13 football team

=== Women ===
- Jharkhand women's football team
- Jharkhand women's under-19 football team
- Jharkhand women's under-17 football team

== Affiliated district associations ==
All 24 district of Jharkhand are affiliated with the Jharkhand Football Association.

No.	Association	District	President
1	Bokaro District Football Association	Bokaro	
2	Chatra District Football Association	Chatra	
3	Deoghar District Football Association	Deoghar	
4	Dhanbad District Football Association	Dhanbad	
5	Dumka District Football Association	Dumka	
6	East Singhbhum District Football Association	East Singhbhum	
7	Garhwa District Football Association	Garhwa	
8	Giridih District Football Association	Giridih	
9	Godda District Football Association	Godda	
10	Gumla District Football Association	Gumla	
11	Hazaribagh District Football Association	Hazaribagh	
12	Jamtara District Football Association	Jamtara	
13	Khunti District Football Association	Khunti	
14	Kodarma District Football Association	Kodarma	
15	Latehar District Football Association	Latehar	
16	Lohardaga District Football Association	Lohardaga	
17	Pakur District Football Association	Pakur	
18	Palamu District Football Association	Palamu	
19	Ramgarh District Football Association	Ramgarh	
20	Ranchi District Football Association	Ranchi	
21	Sahibganj District Football Association	Sahibganj	
22	Seraikela Kharsawan District Football Association	Seraikela Kharsawan	
23	Simdega District Football Association	Simdega	
24	West Singhbhum District Football Association	West Singhbhum	

== Competitions ==
=== Club level ===
==== Men's senior ====
- JSA League Premier Division
- JSA League Super Division
- JSA League A Division

==== Women's senior ====
- JSA Women's League

== Jharkhand Football League pyramid ==
Tier	Division	Promotion & relegation
1 _{(Level 5 on Indian football pyramid)}	JSA League Premier Division	11 teams
2 _{(Level 6 on Indian football pyramid)}	JSA League Super Division	10 teams
3 _{(Level 7 on Indian football pyramid)}	JSA League A Division	19 teams

== See also ==
- List of Indian state football associations
- Football in India
