= 2013–14 Santosh Trophy =

2014 Santosh Trophy
Tournament details
- Country: India
- Teams: 34

Final positions
- Champions: Mizoram (1st title)
- Runners-up: Railways

Tournament statistics
- Matches played: 23
- Goals scored: 63 (2.74 per match)
- Top goal scorer(s): Zico Zoremsanga (Mizoram); R. Reagan (Tamil Nadu) (5 goals each)

The 2014 Santosh Trophy was the 68th edition of the Santosh Trophy, the main state competition in Indian football. The tournament was held in two phases. The final phase was held in Siliguri, West Bengal between 24 February and 9 March 2014. The zone competitions were held between January 26 and February 4, 2014. In the finals, played at Kanchenjunga Stadium, Siliguri, debutant Mizoram beat the Railways 3–0 to clinch the trophy, and the Rs 500,000 prize money, while the runners up Railways received Rs. 300,000.

== Qualified teams ==
Defending champions Services and former champions West Bengal won their respective groups to qualify from East Zone. Railways overcame an unexpected reverse against Assam to clinch their berth in the final round alongside Mizoram from North East Zonal qualifiers. Last year's finalists and 2012 Champion Kerala netted two goals in added time to overhaul Karnataka and qualify behind Tamil Nadu from the South Zone. Maharashtra and Goa were dominant in qualifying from their respective groups in the West Zone. Uttarakhand and Punjab were the last of the teams to seal their final place from North Zone qualifiers. These 10 teams were drawn into two groups for the final stage to be held in Siliguri from 24 February – 9 March 2014.

- Goa
- Kerala
- Maharashtra
- Mizoram
- Punjab
- Railways
- Services
- Tamil Nadu
- Uttarakhand
- West Bengal

== Group stage ==
Key to colours in group tables
Group winners and runners-up advanced to the Knockout Stage

=== Group A ===
Team	Pld	W	D	L	GF	GA	GD	Pts	Qualification
Mizoram	4	4	0	0	11	3	+8	12	A1
Maharashtra	4	3	0	1	5	4	+1	9	A2
Kerala	4	2	0	2	6	4	+2	6	
Services	4	1	0	3	4	6	−2	3	
Uttarakhand	4	0	0	4	3	12	−9	0	

24 February 2014	Maharashtra	3–2	Uttarakhand	Kanchenjunga Stadium, Siliguri
	Dias 37'; Shabaz 43'; Koli 88'	Report	A. Singh 19'; S. Singh 68'

24 February 2014	Kerala	1–3	Mizoram	Kanchenjunga Stadium, Siliguri
	Ronald 79'	Report	Lalbiakhlua 55'; Zico 57'; F. Lalrinpuia 71'

26 February 2014	Kerala	4–0	Uttarakhand	Kanchenjunga Stadium, Siliguri
	Justus 12'; Suhair 29', 34'; Nasaruddin 46'	Report

26 February 2014	Services	0–1	Maharashtra	Kanchenjunga Stadium, Siliguri
		Report	Pathan 85'

28 February 2014	Maharashtra	0–2	Mizoram	Kanchenjunga Stadium, Siliguri
		Report	Lalnunmawia 68'; Lalfakzuala 84'

28 February 2014	Services	3–0	Uttarakhand	Kanchenjunga Stadium, Siliguri
	J. Singh 55'; A. Tudu 66'; Sumesh 70'	Report

2 March 2014	Mizoram	4–1	Services	Kanchenjunga Stadium, Siliguri
	KC Lalchhuanmawia; Zico; V Laltanpuia 71'; Lalbiakhlua	Report	Arjun Tudu 43'

2 March 2014	Maharashtra	1–0	Kerala	Kanchenjunga Stadium, Siliguri
	Allan Diaz 78'	Report

4 March 2014	Kerala	1–0	Services	Kanchenjunga Stadium, Siliguri
	Nasrudeen C 40'	Report

4 March 2014	Uttarakhand	1–2	Mizoram	Kanchenjunga Stadium, Siliguri
	Saurabh Rawat 86'	Report	Lalnunmawia 21'; David Lalrinmuana 74'

=== Group B ===
Team	Pld	W	D	L	GF	GA	GD	Pts	Qualification
Railways	4	2	2	0	6	2	+4	8	B1
Tamil Nadu	4	2	0	2	7	7	0	6	B2
West Bengal	4	1	2	1	3	3	0	5	
Goa	4	1	1	2	5	8	−3	4	
Punjab	4	0	3	1	4	5	−1	3	

25 February 2014	Goa	1–1	Punjab	Kanchenjunga Stadium, Siliguri
	S. Fernandes 3'	Report	H.Singh 90+2'

25 February 2014	Railways	2–1	Tamil Nadu	Kanchenjunga Stadium, Siliguri
	Raju 54'; S. Narzary 90+2'	Report	AnandRaj 61'

27 February 2014	Tamil Nadu	3–2	Goa	Kanchenjunga Stadium, Siliguri
	Karthick 13'; Reagan 31'; A. Kumar 90+1'	Report	Sequeira 45+1', 51'

27 February 2014	West Bengal	0–0	Punjab	Kanchenjunga Stadium, Siliguri
		Report

1 March 2014	West Bengal	1–2	Goa	Kanchenjunga Stadium, Siliguri
	Snehashish Dutta 55'		Angelo Colaco 24'; Lavino Fernandes 87'

1 March 2014	Punjab	0–0	Railways	Kanchenjunga Stadium, Siliguri

3 March 2014	Railways	1–1	West Bengal	Kanchenjunga Stadium, Siliguri
	Jelendra Brahma 90+3'	Report	Nil Kanta Paria 21'

3 March 2014	Punjab	2–3	Tamil Nadu	Kanchenjunga Stadium, Siliguri
	Sarbjit Singh 52'; Harpreet Singh 57'	Report	Reagan 8', 63', 67'

5 March 2014	West Bengal	1–0	Tamil Nadu	Kanchenjunga Stadium, Siliguri
	Nil Kanta Pariah 88'	Report

5 March 2014	Railways	3–0	Goa	Kanchenjunga Stadium, Siliguri
	Dipankar Das 19'; Susil Kisku 84'; S. Rajesh 87'	Report

== Knockout stage ==
Semi-finals
7 March
Mizoram	3
Tamil Nadu	1
7 March
Railways	1 (5)
Maharashtra	1 (3)

Final
9 March
Mizoram	3
Railways	0

=== Semi-finals ===
7 March 2014

Mizoram	3–1 (a.e.t.)	Tamil Nadu
David Lalrinmuana 62'; Zico Zoremsanga 94'; F Lalrinpuia 119'	Report	Reagan 45+1'

Kanchenjunga Stadium, Siliguri
7 March 2014

Railways	1–1	Maharashtra
Susil Kisku 72'	Report	Mohammed Shafique 24'
Penalties
PC Riju (penalty scored); Raju Singh (penalty scored); Dipankar Das (penalty scored); Susil Kisku (penalty scored)	4–2	(penalty missed) Praneel Mendon; (penalty missed) Shetty; (penalty scored) Paresh Shivalkar; (penalty scored) Linekar Machado

Kanchenjunga Stadium, Siliguri

=== Final ===
9 March 2014

Mizoram	3–0	Railways
Zico Zoremsanga 44', 61'; F Lalrinpuia 90+1'	Report

Kanchenjunga Stadium, Siliguri
