= Indira Gandhi Stadium (Solapur) =

Cricket stadium in India

Coordinates: 17.6712°N 75.9018°E

- Interactive map of Indira Gandhi Stadium
- Location: Solapur, Maharashtra, India
- Country: India
- Establishment: 1972
- Capacity: 30,000
- Owner: Solapur Municipal Corporation
- Operator: Solapur Municipal Corporation
- Tenants: Maharashtra cricket team

The Indira Gandhi Stadium is located in Solapur, in the Indian state of Maharashtra. The venue has a capacity of 30,000 and most of the places are standing places. The stands are not covered with a roof. It is used for several events, but mainly for cricket matches. The stadium became one of the largest sports venues by capacity in the Indian state of Maharashtra. The venue is named after Indira Gandhi, the fourth prime minister of India.

The stadium had witnessed 10 first class matches and five List A matches from 1952 to 1994.
