= Kanchenjunga Stadium =

Multi-purpose stadium in siliguri, India

Kanchenjunga Stadium, Siliguri
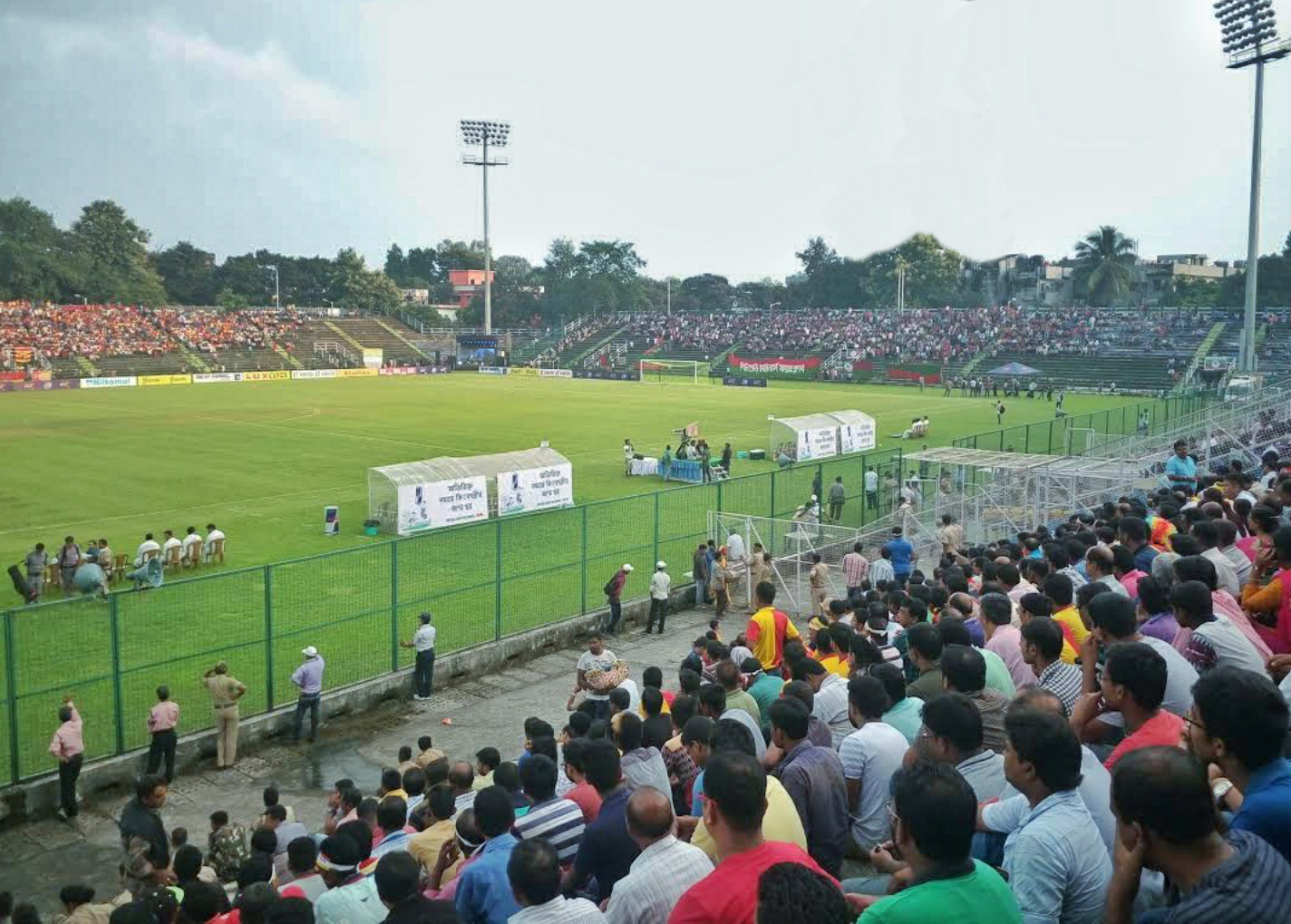
- The stadium on a matchday in 2019
- Interactive map of Kanchenjunga Stadium, Siliguri
- Location: Siliguri, West Bengal
- Country: India
- Establishment: 1980s. The older name of this ground was Tilak Maidan donated by Tilak Bahadur Chhetri to the school children for the playing purpose.
- Capacity: 40,000
- End names
- Bidhan Road
- As of 12 September 2012

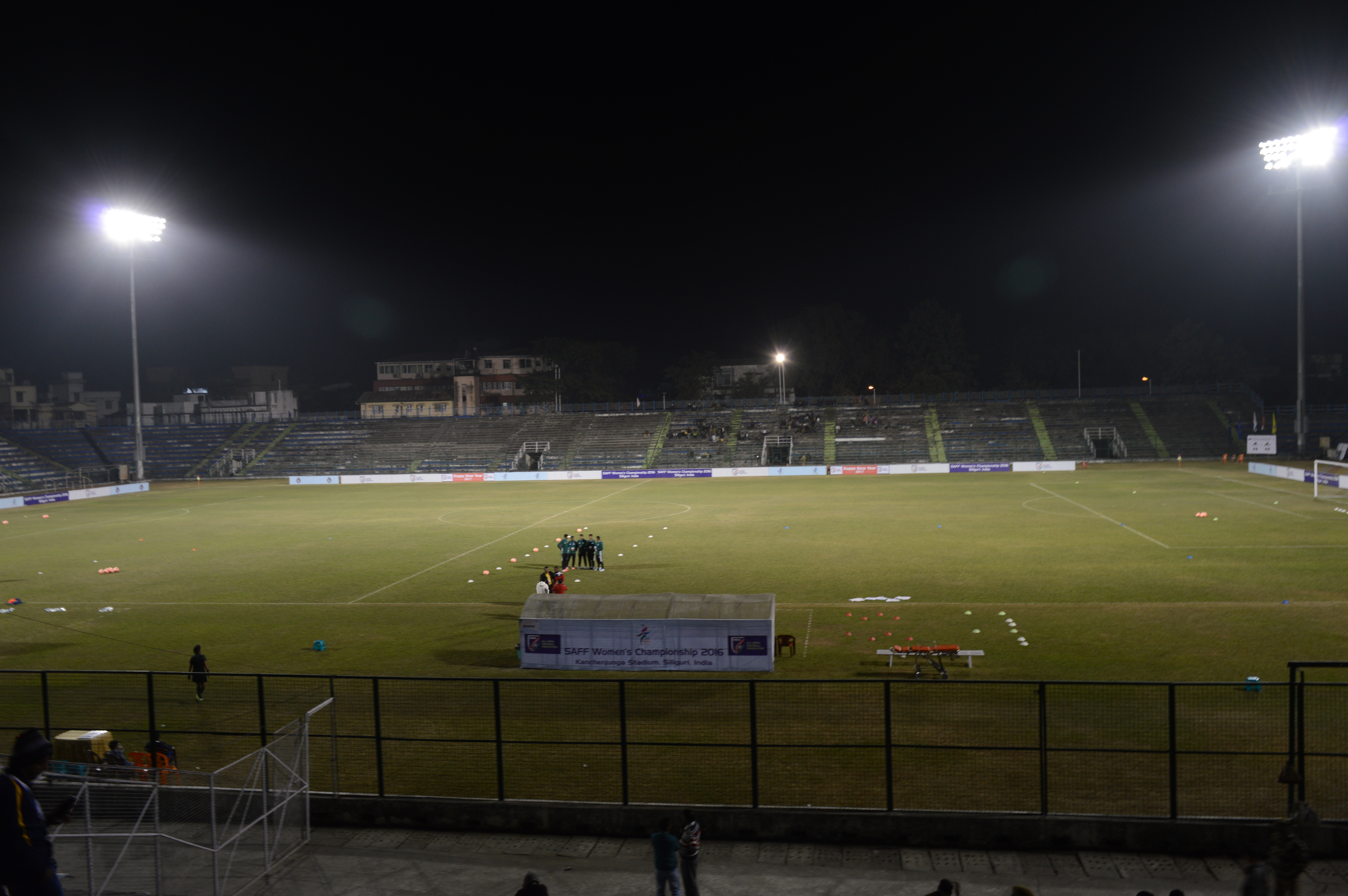
The stadium at night

The Kanchenjunga Stadium, also known as Kanchanjungha Krirangan, is a multi-purpose stadium in Siliguri, India. It is mainly used for staging cricket and football matches. Built in the 1980s, the stadium holds a capacity of 40,000 and is currently the home ground of Siliguri Premier League side Kanchenjunga FC. It also hosted two Kolkata Derby matches in 2016 I-league.

In January 2014, a plan to upgrade the stadium at a cost of Rs 1.7 crore was announced.

== Ranji Trophy Cricket ==
The stadium has hosted 11 Ranji Trophy matches to date. The first ever Ranji Trophy played on this ground was between Bengal and Punjab in 2010.

== Federation Cup 2012 ==
This stadium has hosted Federation Cup 2012 matches of India. The first ever Federation Cup played on this ground was between Mohun Bagan AC and Churchill Brothers S.C. in 2012. Air India FC and Qualifier-I, while group C would consist of East Bengal FC, Sporting Clube de Goa, ONGC FC and Qualifier-II.n all, ten group matches will be played in Siliguri, the majority of which will be played under lights. In the opening match, Mohun Bagan AC will cross swords with Churchill Brothers FC.

== Celebrity Cricket League ==
The stadium has hosted two Celebrity Cricket League matches till date of Third season. The first ever Celebrity Cricket League played on this ground was between Veer Marathi vs Karnataka Bulldozers and Telugu Warriors vs Bengal Tigers in 2013.

== Santosh Trophy ==
The final matches of the 2013–14 Santosh Trophy were played at the stadium in March 2014, including the final on 9 March 2014. Mizoram won the championship.

== I-League 2nd division ==
The stadium hosted seven rounds of 2015 I-League 2nd Division. This was the first leg of the league.

== SAFF Women's Championship ==
The stadium hosted 2016 SAFF Women's Championship. All matches were played in the Kanchenjunga Stadium in Siliguri, West Bengal.
