= Sandesh Gadkari =

Indian footballer (born 1987)

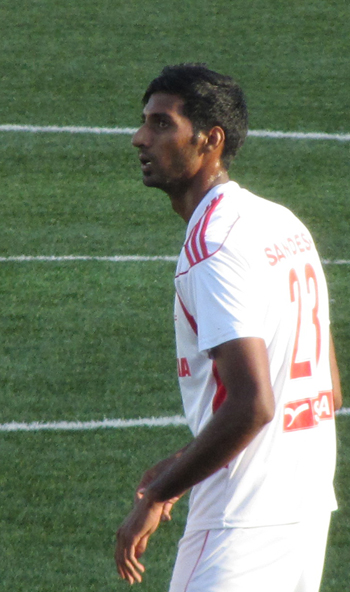

Personal information
- Date of birth: 16 March 1987 (age 39)
- Place of birth: Pune, Maharashtra, India
- Height: 1.88 m (6 ft 2 in)
- Position: Forward

Team information
- Current team: Mumbai

Youth career
- 2007–2011: Pune

Senior career*
Years	Team	Apps	(Gls)
2010–2011	Air India	12	(7)
2012	Salgaocar	0	(0)
2012–13	Air India	10	(0)
2013–2014	Rangdajied United	12	(1)
2015–	Mumbai	0	(0)
- * Club domestic league appearances and goals as of 21 April 2014

Sandesh Gadkari (born 16 March 1987) is an Indian football player who currently plays as a forward for Mumbai in the I-League.

== Career ==
=== Air India ===
During the summer of 2011, Sandesh signed with Air India FC.

=== Salgaocar ===
Gadkari has completed his widely speculated move to Goa-based Salgaocar SC when he signed on the dotted lines to ink a two-year deal with Karim Bencharifa's army.

=== Air India return ===
After leaving Salgaocar F.C. after a not so pleasing term with the Goan club Gadkari re-signed with Air India FC in the I-League and made his return debut for the club on 30 December 2012 against now former club Salgaocar at the Duler Stadium in which Air India lost the match 4–0.

=== Rangdajied United ===
Gadkari made his debut for Rangdajied in the I-League on 22 September 2013 against Prayag United at the Salt Lake Stadium; in which he played till the 81st minute before being replaced by Joy Mrong Kharraswai; as Rangdajied lost the match 0–2.

==== Incometax Mumbai ====
Currently plays for Incometax Mumbai

=== Mumbai ===
Before the 2015–16 I-League, and after missing the entire 2014–15 season without a club, Gadkari joined Mumbai in the Mumbai Football League.

== Career statistics ==
=== Club ===
As of 21 April 2014

Club	Season	League			Cup			AFC			Total		
Club	Season	Apps	Goals	Assists	Apps	Goals	Assists	Apps	Goals	Assists	Apps	Goals	Assists
Air India	2011–12	12	7	0	0	0	0	0	0	0	12	7	0
Air India	2012–13	10	0	0	0	0	0	0	0	0	10	0	0
Rangdajied	2013–14	12	1	0	0	0	0	0	0	0	12	1	0
Career total		34	8	0	0	0	0	0	0	0	34	8	0
