= 2022–23 Gokulam Kerala FC season =

Indian football club season

Gokulam Kerala
2022–23 season
- Chairman: (India) Gokulam Gopalan
- Head Coach: (Cameroon) Richard Towa (until 22 December) (Spain) Francesc Bonet (from 27 December)
- Stadium: Payyanad Stadium; EMS Stadium
- I-League: 3rd
- Baji Rout Cup: Quarter-finals
- Super Cup: Group Stage
- Top goalscorer: League: Sergio Mendigutxia; 8 Goals; All: Sergio Mendigutxia; 9 Goals
- Highest home attendance: 8,234 (vs Mohammedan)
- Lowest home attendance: 1,216 (vs Aizawl )
- Average home league attendance: 5,192
- Biggest win: 3-0 (vs Sudeva Delhi (H), 7 December 2022, I-League); 3-0 (vs Aizawl (H), 25 February 2023, I-League); 1-4 (vs Sudeva Delhi (A), 6 March 2023, I-League)
- All statistics correct as of 29 April 2023.

The 2022–23 season is Gokulam Kerala's sixth season since its establishment in 2017 and their fifth season in the I-League. In addition to the I-League, Gokulam Kerala also participated in the Super Cup and IFA Shield.

== Current technical staff ==
Position	Name
Head coach	(Spain) Francesc Bonet
Fitness and conditioning Coach	(Brazil) Djair Miranda Garcia
Technical Director	Vacant
Goalkeeping Coach	(Nepal) Manish Timsina

== Kits ==
Home	Away

== First-team squad ==
Squad no.	Name	Nationality	Position(s)	Age	Previous club	Since	Apps	Goals	Assists
Goalkeepers
1	Bilal Khan	(India)	GK	28	(India) Real Kashmir	2022	16	0	0
40	James Kithan	(India)	GK	27	(India) Delhi	2022	1	0	0
42	Shibinraj Kunniyil	(India)	GK	29	(India) Sreenidi Deccan	2022	34	0	0
Defenders
2	Subhankar Adhikari	(India)	CB	25	(India) GKFC Reserves	2022	23	0	1
3	Mohammed Jassim	(India)	LB	25	(India) GKFC Reserves	2020	39	0	3
4	Pawan Kumar	(India)	CB	27	(India) Real Kashmir	2021	33	0	1
17	Aminou Bouba	(Cameroon)	CB	31	(Cameroon) Eding Sport FC	2021	56	3	2
24	Abdul Hakku	(India)	CB	27	(India) Real Kashmir	2022	22	2	1
46	Vikas Saini	(India)	RB	25	(India) Churchill Brothers	2022	16	0	1
66	Sajad Hussain Parray	(India)	LB	19	(India) Hyderabad	2023	1	0	0
93	Akhil Praveen	(India)	CB	28	(India) Kerala United	2022	1	0	0
MidFielders
7	Thahir Zaman	(India)	AM	27	(India) GKFC Reserves	2020	54	9	2
8	Rishad PP	(India)	CM	26	(India) GKFC Reserves	2021	24	2	3
10	Kaká	(Brazil)	AM	31	(Saudi Arabia) Arar	2022	6	0	0
14	Jijo Joseph	(India)	AM	30	(India) Kickstart FC	2023	4	1	0
15	Arjun Jayaraj	(India)	AM	26	(India) Kerala United	2022	39	2	1
18	Shilton D'Silva	(India)	CM	30	(India) Rajasthan United	2023	8	1	0
23	Farshad Noor	(Afghanistan)	CM	28	Bahrain SC	2022	25	5	4
29	Noufal PN	(India)	AM	22	(India) GKFC Reserves	2022	23	0	6
47	Omar Ramos	(Spain)	AM	34	(India) Rajasthan United	2022	11	1	2
50	Tanmoy Ghosh	(India)	AM	22	(India) BSS Sporting Club	2022	13	0	0
99	Rahul Raju	(India)	AM	19	(India) Bengaluru B	2022	22	1	0
Forwards
9	Samuel Mensah Koney	(Ghana)	FW	26	(India) GKFC Reserves	2023	4	2	0
13	Sreekuttan VS	(India)	FW	23	(India) Kerala blasters	2022	47	3	4
17	Sourav K	(India)	FW	21	(India) GKFC Reserves	2021	24	2	2
19	Jobby Justin	(India)	FW	29	(India) Chennaiyin	2023	13	1	1
20	Dilip Oraon	(India)	FW	21	(India) United	2022	1	0	0
22	Shijin Thadhyouse	(India)	FW	21	(India) SAI	2022	14	3	1
70	Sergio Mendigutxia	(Spain)	FW	29	(Italy) US Mariglianese	2022	16	9	0

=== New contracts ===
Date	Position	No.	Player	Ref.
28 May 2021	DF	15	(Cameroon) Aminou Bouba	

== Transfers & loans ==
=== Transfers in ===
Entry date	Position	No.	Player	Previous club	Fee	Ref.
3 July 2022	MF	15	(India) Arjun Jayaraj	(India) Kerala United	None	
11 July 2022	MF		(India) Tanmoy Ghosh	(India) BSS Sporting	None	
12 July 2022	MF		(India) Akhil Praveen	(India) Kerala United	None	
15 July 2022	DF		(India) Bibin Ajayan	(India) Golden Threads FC	None	
21 July 2022	MF		(India) Sukuram Sardar	(India) Railways	None	
26 July 2022	FW		(India) Shijin	(India) SAI Kollam	None	
4 August 2022	FW		(Montenegro) Vladan Kordic	(Montenegro) Arsenal Tivat	None	
21 August 2022	FW		(Cameroon) Auguste Somlaga	(Libya) Al Afriqi	None	
25 August 2022	MF		(Brazil) Kaká	(Saudi Arabia) Arar	None	
31 August 2022	DM		(Argentina) Juan Nellar	(Italy) Sancolombano	None	
2 September 2022	FW		(India) Sreekuttan VS	(India) Kerala Blasters	None	
15 September 2022	DF	2	(India) Subhankar Adhikari	(India) Reserves	None	
15 September 2022	DF		(India) Vikas Saini	(India) Churchill Brothers	None	
15 September 2022	MF		(India) Noufal	(India) BASCO FC	None	
15 September 2022	MF	23	(Afghanistan) Farshad Noor	Bahrain SC	None	
15 September 2022	FW		(India) Dilip Oraon	(India) United	None	
15 September 2022	FW		(Ghana) Dodi	(Ghana)	None	
15 September 2022	GK	1	(India) Bilal Khan	(India) Real Kashmir	None	
15 September 2022	GK	40	(India) James Kithan	(India) Delhi	None	
1 January 2023	DF	24	(India) Abdul Hakku	(India) Real Kashmir	None	
6 January 2023	MF	47	(Spain) Omar Ramos	(India) Rajasthan United	None	
6 January 2023	FW	70	(Spain) Sergio Mendigutxia	(Italy) US Mariglianese	None	
16 January 2023	FW	9	(Kyrgyzstan) Eldar Moldozhunusov	(Kyrgyzstan) Neftchi	None	
16 January 2023	FW	19	(India) Jobby Justin	(India) Chennaiyin	None	
28 January 2023	MF		(India) Shilton D'Silva	(India) Rajasthan United	None	
2 April 2023	FW		(Ghana) Samuel Mensah Koney	(India) Reserves	None	
2 April 2023	DF		(India) Saurabh Meher	(India) Reserves	None	

=== Loan in ===
Start date	End date	Position	No.	Player	From club	Fee	Ref
15 September 2022	End of season	FW	99	(India) Rahul Raju	(India) Bengaluru B	None	
15 September 2022	End of season	GK	42	(India) Shibinraj Kunniyil	(India) Indian Air Force	None	
31 December 2022	31 May 2023	DF		(India) Sajad Hussain Parray	(India) Hyderabad	Undisclosed	
30 January 2023	31 May 2023	MF		(India) Jijo Joseph	(India) SBI	None	

=== Transfers out ===
Exit date	Position	No.	Player	To club	Fee	Ref.
1 July 2022	DF	24	(India) Abdul Hakku	(India) Kerala Blasters	Loan Return	
1 July 2022	FW	13	(India) Sreekuttan VS	(India) Kerala Blasters	Loan Return	
15 July 2022	DF	4	(India) Alex Saji	(India) Hyderabad	Free	
4 August 2022	GK	1	(India) Rakshit Dagar	(India) Jamshedpur	Free	
5 August 2022	DF	16	(India) Muhammad Uvais	(India) Jamshedpur	Free	
18 August 2022	MF	18	(India) Jithin M S	(India) NorthEast United	Free	
20 August 2022	MF	11	(India) Emil Benny	(India) NorthEast United	Free	
1 September 2022	FW		(India) Sukuram Sardar	(India) Diamond Harbour		
13 September 2022	FW	98	(Jamaica) Jourdaine Fletcher	(India) NEROCA	Free	
23 September 2022	FW	99	(Slovenia) Luka Majcen	(India) RoundGlass Punjab	Free	
10 October 2022	DF	27	(India) Takhellambam Deepak	(India) Reserves	Free	
10 October 2022	DM	06	(India) Charles Anandraj	(India) Bengaluru United	Free	
10 October 2022	MF	12	(India) Muhammed Rashid	(India) Reserves	Free	
10 October 2022	MF	14	(India) Zodingliana Ralte	(India) Aizawl	Free	
10 October 2022	MF	20	(Sri Lanka) Ahmed Waseem Razeek	(Hong Kong) Eastern District	Free	
10 October 2022	MF	20	(Afghanistan) Sharif Mukhammad	(India) Churchill Brothers	Free	
10 October 2022	MF	42	(India) Abhijith K	(India) Reserves	Free	
10 October 2022	FW	10	(India) Ngangom Ronald Singh	(India) Reserves	Free	
10 October 2022	MF	19	(Ghana) Rahim Osumanu		Free	
10 October 2022	FW	22	(India) Beneston Barretto	(India) Reserves	Free	
5 January 2023	FW	9	(Cameroon) Auguste Somlaga	(India) Mumbai Kenkre	Released	
5 January 2023	FW	98	(Cameroon) Dodi Nde	(India) Reserves	Released	
5 January 2023	MF	5	(Argentina) Juan Nellar	(India) Punjab	Released	
22 January 2023	DF	32	(India) Shahajaz Thekkan		Mutual agreement	
24 January 2023	FW		(Montenegro) Vladan Kordic	(Montenegro) Bokelj	None	
20 March 2023	FW	9	(Kyrgyzstan) Eldar Moldozhunusov	(Kyrgyzstan) Neftchi	None	

== Pre-season ==
=== Baji Rout Cup ===
==== Quarter finals ====
4 November 2022 QF	Churchill Brothers	1–1 (5–3 p)	Gokulam Kerala	Angul, Odisha
09.00 IST	Sané 90+2'	Report	A. Somlaga 90+4'	Stadium: Kadam Padia Stadium
	Penalties
	M. Cissé (penalty scored); Vaz (penalty scored); Costa (penalty scored); Tana (penalty scored); Sané (penalty scored)		Bouba (penalty scored); Noor (penalty scored); J. Nellar (penalty scored); Jasim (penalty missed)

== Competitions ==
=== Overview ===
Competition	First match	Last match	Starting round	Final position	Record							
Competition	First match	Last match	Starting round	Final position	Pld	W	D	L	GF	GA	GD	Win %
I-League	12 November 2022	12 March 2023	Match Day 1	3rd	22	12	3	7	26	14	+12	54.55
Indian Super Cup	5 April 2023	18 April 2023	Qualifiers	Group Stage	4	1	0	3	8	11	−3	25.00
play–offs for AFC Cup	29 April 2023		Play Off	Playoff	1	0	0	1	1	3	−2	0.00
Total					27	13	3	11	35	28	+7	48.15

Last updated: 29 April 2023
Source: Competitions

=== I-League ===
==== League table ====
Pos	Team	Pld	W	D	L	GF	GA	GD	Pts	Qualification
1	RoundGlass Punjab (C, P)	22	16	4	2	45	16	+29	52	Champions, Promotion to 2023–24 Indian Super League
2	Sreenidi Deccan	22	13	3	6	44	29	+15	42	
3	Gokulam Kerala	22	12	3	7	26	14	+12	39	
4	TRAU	22	11	2	9	34	34	0	35	
5	Real Kashmir	22	9	7	6	27	25	+2	34	

Source: I-League
Rules for classification: 1) points; 2) head-to-head points; 3) head-to-head goal difference; 4) goal difference; 5) number of goals scored; 6) drawing of lots
(C) Champions; (P) Promoted

=== Results by round ===
Round	1	2	3	4	5	6	7	8	9	10	11	12	13	14	15	16	17	18	19	20	21	22
Ground	H	A	A	A	A	H	H	H	A	H	H	H	H	A	H	A	A	A	H	A	A	H
Result	W	W	D	L	D	W	W	D	L	W	L	W	W	L	L	L	W	W	W	L	W	W
Position	4	3	3	5	5	3	2	3	4	3	4	3	3	3	3	4	4	3	3	3	3	3

Updated to match(es) played on 12 March 2023. Source:
A = Away; H = Home; W = Win; D = Draw; L = Loss

==== Matches ====
Note: I-League announced the fixtures for the 2022–23 season on 1 November 2022.

12 November 2022 1	Gokulam Kerala	1–0	Mohammedan	Manjeri
16.30 IST	Noor (yellow card) 11'; Raju (yellow card) 51'; A. Somlaga 53'	Report	Davronov (yellow card) 11'; Davis (yellow card) 47'	Stadium: Payyanad Stadium; Attendance: 8,234; Referee: K Ramdasan; Man of the Match: Auguste Somlaga (Gokulam Kerala)

18 November 2022 2	Aizawl	0–1	Gokulam Kerala	Aizawl
14.00 IST		Report	Zaman 87'; Bouba (yellow card) 90+2'; Jasim (yellow card) 90+5'	Stadium: Rajiv Gandhi Stadium; Attendance: 3,174; Referee: Williams Joy Koshy; Man of the Match: Henry Kisekka (Aizawl)

22 November 2022 3	Real Kashmir	0–0	Gokulam Kerala	Srinagar
14.00 IST	Moro (yellow card) 45+1'	Report	Bouba (yellow card) 44'	Stadium: TRC Turf Ground; Attendance: 3,500; Referee: Dipu Roy; Man of the Match: Shibinraj Kunniyil (Gokulam Kerala)

27 November 2022 4	Sreenidi Deccan	1–0	Gokulam Kerala	Hyderabad
14.00 IST	Shayesteh 63'	Report	Kumar (yellow card) 12'; Bouba (yellow card) 35'	Stadium: Deccan Arena; Attendance: 1,013; Referee: Ashish Tiwari; Man of the Match: Faysal Shayesteh (Sreenidi Deccan)

4 December 2022 5	Mumbai Kenkre	1–1	Gokulam Kerala	Mumbai
16.30 IST	Lalhmangaihsanga 3'	Report	Shijin T 53'	Stadium: Cooperage Ground; Attendance: 2,758; Referee: Jehrul Islam; Man of the Match: Lalhmangaihsanga (Mumbai Kenkre)

7 December 2022 6	Gokulam Kerala	3–0	Sudeva Delhi	Manjeri
19.00 IST	D. Ndo (yellow card) 43' (goal) 53'; Saini (yellow card) 50'; Shijin T 61', 70'	Report	Paul (yellow card) 20'; A. Khan (yellow card) 82'	Stadium: Payyanad Stadium; Attendance: 2,150; Referee: Mrutyunjay L Amatya; Man of the Match: Shijin Thadhayouse (Gokulam Kerala)

12 December 2022 7	Gokulam Kerala	1–0	Rajasthan United	Manjeri
19.00 IST	A. Somlaga (yellow card) 38'; Sreekuttan 51'; D. Ndo (yellow card) 81'; Shijin T (yellow card) 82'	Report	Ali Sardar (yellow card) 90+8'; Beitia (yellow card) 90+11' (red card) 90+11'	Stadium: Payyanad Stadium; Attendance: 3,600; Referee: Lakshay; Man of the Match: Sreekuttan VS (Gokulam Kerala)

15 December 2022 8	Gokulam Kerala	0-0	NEROCA	Manjeri
16.30 IST	Dilip Oraon (yellow card) 5'; Vikas Saini (yellow card) 36'; Arjun Jayaraj (yellow card) 90'	Report	David Simbo (yellow card) 57'	Stadium: Payyanad Stadium; Attendance: 1,320; Referee: Lalit Singh Rawat; Man of the Match: Lunminlen Haokip (NEROCA)

21 December 2022 9	Punjab	1-0	Gokulam Kerala	Gurgaon
19.00 IST				Stadium: Tau Devi Lal Stadium

8 January 2023 10	Gokulam Kerala	1-0	Churchill Brothers	Manjeri
16.30 IST	Pawan Kumar (yellow card) 18'; Sreekuttan VS (yellow card) 65'; Sergio Mendigutxia 80'; Mohammed Jassim (yellow card) 90'; Aminou Bouba (yellow card) 90+4'	Report	Sharif Mukhammad (yellow card) 66'	Stadium: Payyanad Stadium; Attendance: 2,315; Referee: K Ramadasan; Man of the Match: Sergio Mendigutxia (Gokulam Kerala)

15 January 2023 11	Gokulam Kerala	1-2	TRAU	Manjeri
16.30 IST	Thahir Zaman 86'	Report	Manash Protim Gogoi 57'; Salam Johnson Singh 78'	Stadium: Payyanad Stadium; Attendance: 1,550; Referee: Tanmoy Dhar; Man of the Match: Manash Protim Gogoi (TRAU)

20 January 2023 12	Gokulam Kerala	2-0	Real Kashmir	Calicut
16.30 IST	Thahir Zaman 35'; Rahul Raju (yellow card) 36'; Sreekuttan VS (yellow card) 45+5'; Jobby Justin 86'	Report	Richard Osei (yellow card) 36'	Stadium: EMS Stadium; Attendance: 2,864; Referee: Williams Joy Koshiy; Man of the Match: Omar Ramos (Gokulam Kerala)

29 January 2023 14	Gokulam Kerala	1-0	Kenkre	Calicut
16.30 IST	Sergio Mendigutxia 21'; Rahul Raju (yellow card) 54' (yellow-red card) 55'	Report	Kiran Pandhre (yellow card) 17'	Stadium: EMS Stadium; Attendance: 2,352; Referee: Mrutyunjay L Amatya; Man of the Match: Sergio Mendigutxia (Gokulam Kerala)

5 February 2023 15	NEROCA	2-1	Gokulam Kerala	Imphal
16.30 IST		Report	Sergio Mendigutxia (yellow card) 33'; Aminou Bouba 77'	Stadium: Khuman Lampak Main Stadium; Attendance: 1,350; Referee: Williams Joy Koshy

9 February 2023 16	Gokulam Kerala	1-2	Punjab	Calicut
16.30 IST	Thahir Zaman (yellow card) 32'; Subhankar Adhikari (yellow card) 45'; Vikas Saini (yellow card) 60'; Farshad Noor 73' (yellow card) 77'; Kumar (yellow card) 84'	Report	Juan Nellar (yellow card) 7'; Kumar 42' (o.g.); Luka Majcen 70'	Stadium: EMS Stadium; Attendance: 1,285; Referee: LALIT SINGH RAWAT; Man of the Match: Luka Majcen (Punjab)

12 February 2023 17	Mohammedan	2-1	Gokulam Kerala	Kolkata
16.30 IST	Wayne Vaz (yellow card) 29'; Abiola Dauda 67'; Kean Lewis 90+3'	Report	Abdul Hakku 13'	Stadium: Kishore Bharati Krirangan; Attendance: 2,126; Referee: KYNSANPHAR LYNGDOH NONGUM; Man of the Match: Kean Lewis (Mohammedan SC)

15 February 2023 13	Rajasthan United	1–2	Gokulam Kerala	New Delhi
16.30 IST	Neihsial (yellow card) 4'; Amangeldiev 9'; Renthlei (yellow card) 39' (red card) 89'; Britto (yellow card) 90+2'; J. Singh (yellow card) 90+7'	Report	R. Raju (yellow card) 11'; Noufal (yellow card) 62'; Mendigutxia 90' (pen.), 90+8'	Stadium: Ambedkar Stadium; Attendance: 407; Referee: Rahul Kumar Gupta; Man of the Match: Sergio Mendigutxia (Gokulam Kerala)

19 February 2023 18	Churchill Brothers	0-1	Gokulam Kerala	Margao
16.30 IST	Abdoulaye Sané (yellow card) 45+2'; Vanlalduatsanga (yellow card) 90+4'; Momo Cissé (yellow card) 90+7'	Report	Farshad Noor 20'; Shilton D'Silva (yellow card) 60'; Aminou Bouba (yellow card) 63'; Jobby Justin (yellow card) 90+4'; Pawan Kumar (yellow card) 90+7'	Stadium: GMC Athletic Stadium; Attendance: 1,100; Referee: MRUTYUNJAY L AMATYA; Man of the Match: Farshad Noor (Gokulam Kerala)

25 February 2023 19	Gokulam Kerala	3-0	Aizawl	Calicut
16.30 IST	Rahul Raju 35'; Mendigutxia 57'; Mohammed Jassim (yellow card) 70'; Jijo Joseph 90'; Farshad Noor (yellow card) 90+3'	Report	Lalchhawnkima (yellow card) 63'; KC Larchhuakmawia (yellow card) 90+2' (yellow-red card) 90+6'	Stadium: EMS Stadium; Attendance: 1,216; Referee: V ESHWAR RAO; Man of the Match: Noufal PN(Gokulam Kerala)

2 March 2023 20	TRAU	1-0	Gokulam Kerala	Imphal
19.00 IST	Gérson Vieira 60'	Report	Sreekuttan VS (yellow card) 31'; Jijo Joseph (yellow card) 36'; Sergio Mendigutxia (yellow card) 51'	Stadium: Khuman Lampak Main Stadium; Attendance: 1,308; Referee: WILLIAMS JOY KOSHY; Man of the Match: Salam Johnson Singh (TRAU)

6 March 2023 21	Sudeva Delhi	1-4	Gokulam Kerala	New Delhi
15.00 IST	Alexis Gómez 15' (yellow card) 86'; R Lawmnasangzuala (yellow card) 51'; Lalhrezuala Sailung (yellow card) 80'	Report	Sergio Mendigutxia 11', 87' (pen.); Shilton D'Silva 49' (yellow card) 80'; Farshad Noor 63'	Stadium: Chhatrasal Stadium; Attendance: 250; Referee: PRIYOBARTA SINGH LANGPOKLAKPAM; Man of the Match: Sergio Mendigutxia (Gokulam Kerala)

12 March 2023 22	Gokulam Kerala	1-0	Sreenidi Deccan	Calicut
16.30 IST	Mohammed Jassim (yellow card) 5'; Sergio Mendigutxia 50' (pen.)	Report	Shayesteh (yellow card) 49'	Stadium: EMS Stadium; Attendance: 1,253; Referee: SENTHIL NATHAN S Man of the Match: Shibinraj Kunniyil (Gokulam Kerala)

=== Super Cup ===
After finishing 3rd in the I-League, the Malabarians won a qualifier against 8th-ranked Mohammedan to earn a place in the group stage.

=== Qualifiers ===
5 April 2023 Q-2	Gokulam Kerala FC	5–2	Mohammedan	Manjeri
20:30 IST	Ramos 10'; Sourav 47'; Noor 64'; Zaman 78'; Nediyodath 87'	Report	Dauda 27', 48'	Stadium: Payyanad Stadium; Man of the Match: Omar Ramos

=== Group stage ===
==== Group C ====
Pos	Team	Pld	W	D	L	GF	GA	GD	Pts	Qualification	JAM	FCG	AMB	GOK
1	Jamshedpur	3	3	0	0	11	5	+6	9	Advance to knockout stage	—	—	3–0	3–2
2	Goa	3	2	0	1	5	5	0	6		3–5	—	—	—
3	ATK Mohun Bagan	3	1	0	2	5	5	0	3		—	0–1	—	5–1
4	Gokulam Kerala (H)	3	0	0	3	3	9	−6	0		—	1–0	—	—

Source: AIFF
Rules for classification: 1) points; 2) head-to-head points; 3) head-to-head goal difference; 4) goal difference; 5) number of goals scored; 6) drawing of lots
(H) Hosts

==== Matches ====
10 April 2023 1	ATK Mohun Bagan	5–1	Gokulam Kerala	Kozhikode
17.00 IST	Colaco 6', 27'; Boumous 45'; Manvir 63'; Bose (yellow card) 70'; Nassiri 90+4'	Report	Jassim (yellow card) 38'; Mendigutxia 72'; Bouba (yellow card) 87'	Stadium: EMS Stadium; Attendance: 1,743; Referee: Venkatesh R Man of the Match: Liston Colaco (ATK Mohun Bagan)

14 April 2023 2	Gokulam Kerala	0–1	Goa	Kozhikode
17.00 IST	Sreekuttan (yellow card) 45+1'; Zaman (yellow card) 72'	Report	Gama (yellow card) 43'; Guarrotxena 90'	Stadium: EMS Stadium; Attendance: 1,274; Referee: Harish Kundu; Man of the Match: Noah Sadaoui (Goa)

18 April 2023 3	Jamshedpur	3–2	Gokulam Kerala	Kozhikode
17:00 IST	Sawyer 40'; Choudhary 59'; Pandita 69'	Report	S. Konney 33', 62'; Saini (yellow card) 57'; D'Silva (yellow card) 71'	Stadium: EMS Stadium; Attendance: 1,123; Referee: Senthil Nathan S Man of the Match: Harry Sawyer (Jamshedpur)

=== AFC Cup ===
play–offs for AFC Cup Since the 2023–24 AFC Champions League and the 2023–24 AFC Cup adopted transitional calendar with the switch from Spring-to-Autumn to an Autumn-to-Spring schedule, the All India Football Federation decided that its continental slots are determined by extra playoffs.

29 April 2023	Gokulam Kerala	1–3	Odisha	Kozhikode
19.00 IST	Saini (yellow card) 6'; Nediyodath (yellow card) 9'; Bouba (yellow card) 20'; Noor 36', (yellow card) 59'; Pawan (yellow card) 52'; Mendigutxia (yellow card) 81'	Report	Maurício 18', 32', 53'; Narender (yellow card) 49'; Mawihmingthanga (yellow card) 62'; Meitei (yellow card) 64'	Stadium: EMS Stadium; Attendance: 500; Referee: Tejas Visvasrao Nagvenkar; Man of the Match: Diego Maurício (Odisha FC)

== Squad statistics ==
=== Appearances ===
Players with no appearances are not included on the list.

As of match played 29 April 2023

No.	Pos.	Nat.	Name	I-League		Super Cup		play–offs for AFC Cup		Total	
No.	Pos.	Nat.	Name	Apps	Starts	Apps	Starts	Apps	Starts	Apps	Starts
1	GK	(India)	Bilal Khan	2	2	1	0	0	0	3	2
02	CB	(India)	Subhankar Adhikari	21	20	2	2	0	0	23	22
03	LB	(India)	Mohammed Jassim	14	11	4	4	1	1	19	16
04	CB	(India)	Pawan Kumar	16	15	2	1	1	1	19	17
~~5~~	MF	(Argentina)	Juan Nellar	9	7	0	0	0	0	9	7
07	MF	(India)	Thahir Zaman	20	6	4	0	1	0	25	6
9	FW	(Ghana)	Samuel Mensah Koney	0	0	3	2	1	0	4	2
~~9~~	FW	(Kyrgyzstan)	Eldar Moldozhunusov	10	0	0	0	0	0	10	0
~~9~~	FW	(Cameroon)	Auguste Somlaga	9	8	0	0	0	0	9	8
10	MF	(Brazil)	Kaká	6	3	0	0	0	0	6	3
13	FW	(India)	Sreekuttan VS	22	20	4	2	1	1	27	23
14	MF	(India)	Jijo Joseph	4	1	0	0	0	0	4	1
15	MF	(India)	Arjun Jayaraj	7	3	0	0	0	0	7	3
17	CB	(Cameroon)	Aminou Bouba	21	21	4	4	1	1	26	26
18	MF	(India)	Shilton D'Silva	4	1	3	2	1	1	8	4
19	FW	(India)	Jobby Justin	9	2	4	0	0	0	13	2
22	FW	(India)	Shijin Thadhayouse	14	6	0	0	0	0	14	6
23	MF	(Afghanistan)	Farshad Noor	20	19	4	4	1	1	25	24
24	DF	(India)	Abdul Hakku	11	8	4	3	1	1	16	12
27	FW	(India)	Sourav K	6	1	4	4	1	1	11	6
29	MF	(India)	Noufal PN	19	11	3	2	1	0	23	13
40	GK	(India)	James Kithan	1	1	0	0	0	0	1	1
42	GK	(India)	Shibinraj Kunniyil	19	19	4	4	1	1	24	24
46	DF	(India)	Vikas Saini	12	12	3	2	1	1	16	15
47	MF	(Spain)	Omar Ramos	7	6	4	4	0	0	11	10
50	MF	(India)	Tanmoy Ghosh	13	7	0	0	0	0	13	7
66	DF	(India)	Sajad Hussain Parray	1	0	0	0	0	0	1	0
70	FW	(Spain)	Sergio Mendigutxia	12	12	3	2	1	1	16	15
93	DM	(India)	Akhil Praveen	1	0	0	0	0	0	1	0
99	MF	(India)	Rahul Raju	19	15	3	2	0	0	22	17
~~98~~	FW	(Cameroon)	Dodi Nde	7	1	0	0	0	0	7	1

=== Goal Scorers ===
Rank	No.	Pos.	Nat.	Name	I League	Super Cup	play offs for AFC Cup	Total
1	70	FW	(Spain)	Sergio Mendigutxia	8	1	0	9
2	23	MF	(Afghanistan)	Farshad Noor	3	1	1	5
3	7	AM	(India)	Thahir Zaman	3	1	0	4
4	22	FW	(India)	Shijin Thadhayouse	3	0	0	3
5	9	FW	(Ghana)	Samuel Mensah Koney	0	2	0	2
5	24	DF	(India)	Abdul Hakku	1	1	0	2
7	~~9~~	FW	(Cameroon)	Auguste Somlaga	1	0	0	1
7	13	FW	(India)	Sreekuttan VS	1	0	0	1
7	14	MF	(India)	Jijo Joseph	1	0	0	1
7	17	DF	(Cameroon)	Aminou Bouba	1	0	0	1
7	18	MF	(India)	Shilton D'Silva	1	0	0	1
7	19	FW	(India)	Jobby Justin	1	0	0	1
7	27	FW	(India)	Sourav K	0	1	0	1
7	47	MF	(Spain)	Omar Ramos	0	1	0	1
7	~~98~~	FW	(Cameroon)	Dodi Nde	1	0	0	1
7	99	MF	(India)	Rahul Raju	1	0	0	1

=== Assists ===
Not all goals have an assist.

Rank	No.	Pos.	Nat.	Name	I League	Super Cup	play offs for AFC Cup	Total
1	29	MF	(India)	Noufal Jr	6	0	0	6
2	13	FW	(India)	Sreekuttan VS	4	0	0	4
2	23	MF	(Afghanistan)	Farshad Noor	4	0	0	4
4	17	DF	(Cameroon)	Aminou Bouba	0	2	0	2
4	27	FW	(India)	Sourav K	1	1	0	2
4	47	MF	(Spain)	Omar Ramos	1	1	0	2
7	2	DF	(India)	Subhankar Adhikari	1	0	0	1
7	7	AM	(India)	Thahir Zaman	0	0	1	1
7	~~9~~	FW	(Cameroon)	Auguste Somlaga	1	0	0	1
7	15	MF	(India)	Arjun Jayaraj	1	0	0	1
7	19	FW	(India)	Jobby Justin	1	0	0	1
7	22	FW	(India)	Shijin Thadhayouse	1	0	0	1
7	46	DF	(India)	Vikas Saini	1	0	0	1

=== Clean sheets ===
No.	Nation	Name	I-League	Super Cup	Play Offs for AFC Cup	Total
42	(India)	Shibinraj Kunniyil	11	0	0	11
1	(India)	Bilal Khan	1	0	0	1

=== Disciplinary record ===
As of match played 29 April 2023

No.	Pos.	Name	I League		Super Cup		Play Offs for AFC CUP		Total	
No.	Pos.	Name	Booked	Sent off (straight red)	Booked	Sent off (straight red)	Booked	Sent off (straight red)	Booked	Sent off (straight red)
3	DF	(India) Mohammed Jassim	4	0	1	0	0	0	5	0
4	DF	(India) Pawan Kumar	4	0	0	0	1	0	5	0
7	MF	(India) Thahir Zaman	1	0	1	0	0	0	2	0
~~9~~	FW	(Cameroon) Auguste Somlaga	1	0	0	0	0	0	1	0
13	FW	(India) Sreekuttan VS	3	0	1	0	0	0	4	0
14	MF	(India) Jijo Joseph	1	0	0	0	0	0	1	0
15	MF	(India) Arjun Jayaraj	1	0	0	0	0	0	1	0
17	DF	(Cameroon) Aminou Bouba	5	0	1	0	1	0	7	0
18	MF	(India) Shilton D'Silva	2	0	1	0	0	0	3	0
19	FW	(India) Jobby Justin	1	0	0	0	0	0	1	0
20	FW	(India) Dilip Oraon	1	0	0	0	0	0	1	0
22	FW	(India) Shijin Thadhayouse	1	0	0	0	0	0	1	0
23	MF	(Afghanistan) Farshad Noor	4	0	0	0	1	0	5	0
24	DF	(India) Abdul Hakku	0	0	0	0	1	0	1	0
29	MF	(India) Noufal PN	1	0	0	0	0	0	1	0
46	DF	(India) Vikas Saini	3	0	1	0	1	0	5	0
50	DF	(India) Subhankar Adhikari	1	0	0	0	0	0	1	0
70	FW	(Spain) Sergio Mendigutxia	2	0	0	0	1	0	3	0
~~98~~	FW	(Cameroon) Dodi Ndo	2	0	0	0	0	0	2	0
99	FW	(India) Rahul Raju	5	1	0	0	0	0	5	1

== Club awards ==
=== Player of the Month award ===
Month	Player	Ref.
December	(India) Shibinraj Kunniyil	
January	(India) Rahul Raju	
February	(Afghanistan) Farshad Noor	
