= Bino George =

Indian footballer and manager

Personal information
- Full name: Bino George Chiramal Padinjarathala
- Date of birth: 22 November 1976 (age 49)
- Place of birth: Thrissur, Kerala, India
- Height: 5 ft 2 in (1.57 m)
- Position: Midfielder

Team information
- Current team: East Bengal (assistant)

Senior career*
Years	Team	Apps	(Gls)
1997-1998	MPT Goa	34	(2)
1998–1999	Mohammedan	38	(4)
2000–2001	UB Club Bangalore	28	(2)
2002-2006	Kochin	108	(12)

Managerial career
- 2006–2010: Viva Kerala (assistant)
- 2010–2011: Chirag United (assistant)
- 2012-2013: Quartz SC
- 2013–2015: Kerala Sports council
- 2015–2016: United SC
- 2017–2019: Gokulam Kerala
- 2019–2022: Kerala
- 2019–2021: Gokulam Kerala (technical director)
- 2021–2022: Kerala United
- 2022–2026: East Bengal FC Reserves/U–21 (head coach)
- * Club domestic league appearances and goals

Bino George Chiramal Padinjarathala (born 22 November 1976) is an Indian professional manager (coach) and former footballer. He was the East Bengal assistant coach to Stephen Constantine for the Indian Super League. He also coached the reserve teams. He became the AFC Professional Coaching Diploma first holder from Kerala.

== Playing career ==
=== Non-league ===
Bino started playing at the age of 14, when he was studying in Govt. Model Boys School, Thrissur. Then he went on to play Inter-Collegiate and District level Football tournaments. He was a member of the Tamilnadu State Under-21 Football Team and represented Annamalai University Football Team in All India Inter University Championship held at Karaikudi, Tamilnadu in 1998.

=== Professional career ===
Bino started his professional career by playing for Mormugao Port Trust, Goa in 1997. Then he moved to Kolkata, which is considered to be the Mecca of Indian football. He joined Mohammedan in 1998. Then in 2000, he moved to Bangalore and joined UB Club. After a season long stay in Bengaluru, he returned to Kerala to join Kochin in 2002.

== Coaching career ==
George served as the assistant coach of the now defunct Viva Kerala as well as the Kerala state team in the 35th National Games and 2015 Santosh Trophy nurturing footballers like CK Vineeth, Rino Anto, Zakeer Mundampara and CS Sabeeth. He is currently working as a football coach at Kerala State Sports Council.

On 24 July 2015, it was announced that the United SC appointed George as the head coach of the first team.

On 13 September 2016, George passed the AFC Professional Coaching Diploma and became the first AFC Pro Licence holder from Kerala.

In January 2017, a new football team Gokulam Kerala based in Calicut, Kerala signed George as the head coach, but in the latter days he joined the technical director position. Gokulam Kerala subsequently bid for a place in the I-League and joined the league from 2017–18.

In August 2021, George was appointed as the head coach of Kerala United for the upcoming I-League Qualifiers. Under his stewardship, Kerala United narrowly missed out on qualification to the finals, winning two out of the four group stage matches.

=== Kerala ===
In September 2021, George was named head coach of Kerala for the Santosh Trophy South Zone qualifiers. On 5 December, his Kerala side qualified for the Santosh Trophy finals, beating Puducherry 4–1 and winning all nine points in the group stage.

On 2 May 2022, George helped Kerala win the 2021–22 Santosh Trophy after a pulsating shootout win over heavyweights West Bengal. His side was praised for playing an attractive brand of football to win the title on home soil after a long gap of 29 years.

=== East Bengal ===
In July 2022, George was appointed head coach of East Bengal for the Calcutta Football League and Durand Cup and assistant coach to Stephen Constantine for the Indian Super League, if needed.

== Managerial statistics ==
As of 10 March 2022

Team	From	To	Record				
Team	From	To	G	W	D	L	Win %
Gokulam Kerala	8 October 2017	26 February 2019	40	10	11	19	25.00
Kerala United FC	16 August 2021	present	13	9	2	2	69.23
Total			53	19	13	21	35.85
