= 2021–22 Santosh Trophy qualification =

2021–22 Santosh Trophy qualifiers
Senior Men's National Football Championship Qualifiers

Tournament details
- Country: India
- Teams: 37

Tournament statistics
- Matches played: 52
- Goals scored: 158 (3.04 per match)

The 2021–22 Santosh Trophy qualifiers is the qualifying round for the 2021–22 Santosh Trophy, the premier competition in India for teams representing their regional and state football associations. A total of 37 teams competed in the qualifiers to decide the 10 places in the final round of the tournament.

== Schedule ==
Matchday	Dates									
Matchday	North		East		North-East		South		West	
Matchday	A	B	A	B	A	B	A	B	A	B
Matchday 1	21 November 2021	1 December 2021	1 December 2021	21 November 2021	28 November 2021	28 November 2021	23 November 2021	1 December 2021	24 November 2021	1 December 2021
Matchday 2	23 November 2021	3 December 2021	3 December 2021	23 November 2021	30 November 2021	30 November 2021	25 November 2021	3 December 2021	26 November 2021	3 December 2021
Matchday 3	25 November 2021	5 December 2021	5 December 2021	25 November 2021	2 December 2021	2 December 2021	27 November 2021	5 December 2021	28 November 2021	5 December 2021
Matchday 4	27 November 2021	–								
Matchday 5	29 November 2021	–								

=== Venues ===
- North Zone:
  - Group A → Chandigarh (Sports Complex)
  - Group B → New Delhi, Delhi (Jawaharlal Nehru Stadium)
- East Zone:
  - Group A → Bhubaneswar, Odisha (Kalinga Stadium)
  - Group B → Kalyani, West Bengal (Kalyani Stadium)
- North-East Zone:
  - Group A → Shillong, Meghalaya (Jawaharlal Nehru Stadium)
  - Group B → Imphal, Manipur (Khuman Lampak Main Stadium)
- South Zone:
  - Group A → Bangalore, Karnataka (Bangalore Football Stadium)
  - Group B → Kochi, Kerala (Jawaharlal Nehru Stadium)
- West Zone:
  - Group A → Bhavnagar, Gujarat (Maharaja Krishnakumarsinhji Bhavnagar University Ground)
  - Group B → Jaipur, Rajasthan (Poornima University Ground)

== North Zone ==
=== Group A ===
Pos	Team	Pld	W	D	L	GF	GA	GD	Pts	Qualification	SE	CH	UP	JK	HP
1	Services	4	4	0	0	10	0	+10	12	Final Round	—	—	2–0	—	3–0
2	Chandigarh (H)	4	1	2	1	3	3	0	5		0–2	—	0–0	—	—
3	Uttar Pradesh	4	1	2	1	2	3	−1	5		—	—	—	1–1	1–0
4	Jammu and Kashmir	4	1	2	1	5	7	−2	5		0–3	1–1	—	—	—
5	Himachal Pradesh	4	0	0	4	2	9	−7	0		—	0–2	—	2–3	—

Source: AIFF
Rules for classification: 1) points; 2) head-to-head points; 3) head-to-head goal difference; 4) goal difference; 5) number of goals scored; 6) drawing of lots
(H) Hosts
21 November 2021
9:30

Services	3–0	Himachal Pradesh
Ronaldo Singh 1', 42'; Vivek Kumar 70'	Report

Sports Complex, Chandigarh

21 November 2021
15:00

Jammu and Kashmir	1–1	Chandigarh
Shakir Ahmad Sheikh 7'	Report	37' Sunveer Singh

Sports Complex, Chandigarh

23 November 2021
9:30

Chandigarh	0–0	Uttar Pradesh
	Report

Sports Complex, Chandigarh

23 November 2021
15:00

Jammu and Kashmir	0–3	Services
	Report	4' Tongbram Krishnakanta Singh; 19' Pintu Mahato; 60' Vivek Kumar; (red card) 90' Bhabindra Malla Thakuri

Sports Complex, Chandigarh

25 November 2021
9:30

Uttar Pradesh	1–1	Jammu and Kashmir
Sunil Yadav 90+1'	Report	36' Aakif Javaid

Sports Complex, Chandigarh

25 November 2021
15:00

Himachal Pradesh	0–2	Chandigarh
	Report	11' Gaurav Negi; 47' Shivam Pandey

Sports Complex, Chandigarh

27 November 2021
9:30

Himachal Pradesh	2–3	Jammu and Kashmir
Hemant Thakur 40'; Jaswinder Singh 80'	Report	3' Raja Musharaf; 36' Shakir Ahmad Sheikh; 57' Arun Nagial

Sports Complex, Chandigarh

27 November 2021
15:00

Services	2–0	Uttar Pradesh
Vivek Kumar 65'; Nikhil Sharma 90+4'	Report

Sports Complex, Chandigarh

29 November 2021
9:30

Uttar Pradesh	1–0	Himachal Pradesh
Shishank Sahrawat 30'	Report

Sports Complex, Chandigarh

29 November 2021
15:00

Chandigarh	0–2	Services
	Report	60' Liton Shil; 90+3' Kamardeep Singh

Sports Complex, Chandigarh

=== Group B ===
Pos	Team	Pld	W	D	L	GF	GA	GD	Pts	Qualification	PU	DE	HA	UT
1	Punjab	3	3	0	0	14	0	+14	9	Final Round	—	1–0	2–0	—
2	Delhi (H)	3	2	0	1	15	2	+13	6		—	—	—	11–1
3	Haryana	3	1	0	2	6	6	0	3		—	0–4	—	6–0
4	Uttarakhand	3	0	0	3	1	28	−27	0		0–11	—	—	—

Source: AIFF
Rules for classification: 1) points; 2) head-to-head points; 3) head-to-head goal difference; 4) goal difference; 5) number of goals scored; 6) drawing of lots
(H) Hosts
1 December 2021
9:30

Delhi	11–1	Uttarakhand
Neeraj Bhandari 4'; Jaideep Singh 12'; Rahul Aswal 15'; Karthik Panicker 19'; Rishabh Dobriyal 20', 47'; Dhruv Sharma 42', 45+2'; Gaurav Chadha 54'; Dishant Negi 81', 86'	Report	Anubhav Rawat 90+3'

Jawaharlal Nehru Stadium, New Delhi

1 December 2021
3:00

Punjab	2–0	Haryana
Amarpreet Singh 24'; Tarun Slathia 66'	Report

Jawaharlal Nehru Stadium, New Delhi

3 December 2021
9:30

Haryana	0–4	Delhi
	Report	1', 11' Jaideep Singh; 13' Dhruv Sharma; 65' Gaurav Chadha

Jawaharlal Nehru Stadium, New Delhi

3 December 2021
3:00

Uttarakhand	0–11	Punjab
	Report	11', 43', 54' Amarpreet Singh; 15', 20', 42' Jashandeep Singh; 37'Thangboileb Doungel; 40' Md. Asif; 44' Manvir Singh; 56', 65' Tarun Slathia

Jawaharlal Nehru Stadium, New Delhi

5 December 2021
9:30

Haryana	6–0	Uttarakhand
Vinay 61'; Gaurav Negi 68', 81', 90+4'; Vikas Dalal 89'; Nilesh Saini 90+1'	Report

Jawaharlal Nehru Stadium, New Delhi

5 December 2021
3:00

Punjab	1–0	Delhi
Jashandeep Singh 62'	Report

Jawaharlal Nehru Stadium, New Delhi

== East Zone ==
=== Group A ===
Pos	Team	Pld	W	D	L	GF	GA	GD	Pts	Qualification	OD	JH	BH
1	Odisha (H)	2	1	1	0	6	1	+5	4	Final Round	—	—	5–0
2	Jharkhand	2	1	1	0	3	1	+2	4		1–1	—	—
3	Bihar	2	0	0	2	0	7	−7	0		—	0–2	—

Source: AIFF
Rules for classification: 1) points; 2) head-to-head points; 3) head-to-head goal difference; 4) goal difference; 5) number of goals scored; 6) drawing of lots
(H) Hosts
1 December 2021
14:30

Odisha	5–0	Bihar
Chandra Muduli 7', 71'; Sheikh Farid 37'; Rudra Prasad Pradhan 56'; Kartik Hanstal 85'	Report

Kalinga Stadium, Bhubaneswar

3 December 2021
14:30

Bihar	0–2	Jharkhand
	Report	61', 90+3' Nikhil Barla

Kalinga Stadium, Bhubaneswar

5 December 2021
14:00

Jharkhand	1–1	Odisha
Nikhil Barla 87'	Report	65' Raisen Tudu

Kalinga Stadium, Bhubaneswar

=== Group B ===
Pos	Team	Pld	W	D	L	GF	GA	GD	Pts	Qualification	WB	SK	CG
1	West Bengal (H)	2	2	0	0	3	0	+3	6	Final Round	—	0–1	—
2	Sikkim	2	1	0	1	2	1	+1	3		—	—	2–0
3	Chhattisgarh	2	0	0	2	0	4	−4	0		0–2	—	—

Source: AIFF
Rules for classification: 1) points; 2) head-to-head points; 3) head-to-head goal difference; 4) goal difference; 5) number of goals scored; 6) drawing of lots
(H) Hosts
21 November 2021
14:30

Chhattisgarh	0–2	West Bengal
	Report	16' Mahitosh Roy; 35' Md Fardin Ali

Kalyani Stadium, Kalyani

23 November 2021
14:30

Sikkim	2–0	Chhattisgarh
Abhishek Rai 35'; Bibek Bhutia 78'	Report

Kalyani Stadium, Kalyani

25 November 2021
14:30

West Bengal	1–0	Sikkim
Dilip Orawn 43'	Report

Kalyani Stadium, Kalyani

== North-East Zone ==
=== Group A ===
Pos	Team	Pld	W	D	L	GF	GA	GD	Pts	Qualification	ME	AP	AS
1	Meghalaya (H)	2	2	0	0	8	2	+6	6	Final Round	—	2–0	—
2	Arunachal Pradesh	2	0	1	1	0	2	−2	1		—	—	0–0
3	Assam	2	0	1	1	2	6	−4	1		2–6	—	—

Source: AIFF
Rules for classification: 1) points; 2) head-to-head points; 3) head-to-head goal difference; 4) goal difference; 5) number of goals scored; 6) drawing of lots
(H) Hosts
28 November 2021
14:30

Assam	2–6	Meghalaya
Milan Basumatary 27', 90+2'	Report	15', 50', 59' Dawanchwa Carlos Challam; 30' (o.g.) Akrang Narzary; 78' Maxderidoff Wahlang; 80' Hardy Nongbri

Jawaharlal Nehru Stadium, Shillong

30 November 2021
14:30

Arunachal Pradesh	0–0	Assam
	Report

Jawaharlal Nehru Stadium, Shillong

2 December 2021
14:30

Meghalaya	2–0	Arunachal Pradesh
Sangti Janai Shianglong 87'; Hardy Cliff Nongbri 90+3'	Report

Jawaharlal Nehru Stadium, Shillong

=== Group B ===
Pos	Team	Pld	W	D	L	GF	GA	GD	Pts	Qualification	MA	MZ	NA	TR
1	Manipur (H)	3	2	0	1	4	2	+2	6	Final Round	—	1–0	3–0	0–2
2	Mizoram	3	2	0	1	2	1	+1	6		—	—	1–0	1–0
3	Nagaland	3	1	0	2	6	4	+2	3		—	—	—	—
4	Tripura	3	1	0	2	2	7	−5	3		—	—	0–6	—

Source: AIFF
Rules for classification: 1) points; 2) head-to-head points; 3) head-to-head goal difference; 4) goal difference; 5) number of goals scored; 6) drawing of lots
(H) Hosts
28 November 2021
9:30

Manipur	3–0	Nagaland
Salam Johnson Singh 26', 56'; Sudhir Laitonjam 53'	Report

Khuman Lampak Main Stadium, Imphal

28 November 2021
14:30

Mizoram	1–0	Tripura
Lalhriatpuia 42'	Report

Khuman Lampak Main Stadium, Imphal

30 November 2021
9:30

Manipur	0–2	Tripura
	Report	42' Manajit Singh Barua; 90+3' Bikash Tripura

Khuman Lampak Main Stadium, Imphal

30 November 2021
14:30

Mizoram	1–0	Nagaland
Lalnuntluanga Bawitlung 44'	Report

Khuman Lampak Main Stadium, Imphal

2 December 2021
9:30

Tripura	0–6	Nagaland
	Report	8', 19', 34' Laiwang Bohham; 25' Kakhevi Assumi; 48' Visalie Mezhu; 65' Pursunep

Khuman Lampak Main Stadium, Imphal

2 December 2021
14:30

Manipur	1–0	Mizoram
Ng Bedeenpar Moyon 63'	Report

Khuman Lampak Main Stadium, Imphal

== South Zone ==
=== Group A ===
Pos	Team	Pld	W	D	L	GF	GA	GD	Pts	Qualification	KA	TN	TL	AP
1	Karnataka (H)	3	3	0	0	7	0	+7	9	Final Round	—	4–0	—	1–0
2	Tamil Nadu	3	2	0	1	2	4	−2	6		—	—	—	1–0
3	Telangana	3	1	0	2	4	3	+1	3		0–2	0–1	—	4–0
4	Andhra Pradesh	3	0	0	3	0	6	−6	0		—	—	—	—

Source: AIFF
Rules for classification: 1) points; 2) head-to-head points; 3) head-to-head goal difference; 4) goal difference; 5) number of goals scored; 6) drawing of lots
(H) Hosts
23 November 2021
9:30

Karnataka	4–0	Tamil Nadu
Sudheer Kotikela 41', 53', 75'; Kamalesh P 11'	Report

Bangalore Football Stadium, Bangalore

23 November 2021
15:00

Telangana	4–0	Andhra Pradesh
Yousuf Ali 16'; Mohammed Imaduddin 71', 90+3'; P Joshua 87'	Report

Bangalore Football Stadium, Bangalore

25 November 2021
9:30

Karnataka	1–0	Andhra Pradesh
Kamalesh P 90'	Report

Bangalore Football Stadium, Bangalore

25 November 2021
15:00

Telangana	0–1	Tamil Nadu
	Report	48' Vijay Nagappan

Bangalore Football Stadium, Bangalore

27 November 2021
9:30

Tamil Nadu	1–0	Andhra Pradesh
Senthamizhi S 39'	Report

Bangalore Football Stadium, Bangalore

27 November 2021
15:00

Telangana	0–2	Karnataka
	Report	10' Solaimalai N; 74' Bavu Nishad T P

Bangalore Football Stadium, Bangalore

=== Group B ===
Pos	Team	Pld	W	D	L	GF	GA	GD	Pts	Qualification	KE	PO	LK	AN
1	Kerala (H)	3	3	0	0	18	1	+17	9	Final Round	—	4–1	5–0	—
2	Pondicherry	3	1	1	1	10	5	+5	4		—	—	—	8–0
3	Lakshadweep	3	1	1	1	6	7	−1	4		—	1–1	—	—
4	Andaman and Nicobar	3	0	0	3	1	22	−21	0		0–9	—	1–5	—

Source: AIFF
Rules for classification: 1) points; 2) head-to-head points; 3) head-to-head goal difference; 4) goal difference; 5) number of goals scored; 6) drawing of lots
(H) Hosts
1 December 2021
9:30

Kerala	5–0	Lakshadweep
Nijo Gilbert 4'; Jesin Tk Thonikkara 12'; Mohammed Thanveer 37' (o.g.); Rajesh S 82'; Arjun Jayaraj 90+2'	Report

Jawaharlal Nehru Stadium, Kochi

1 December 2021
15:00

Pondicherry	8–0	Andaman and Nicobar
John Maju 10'; Alson 16', 65', 66'; Sri Rajendra Prasad 45+2', 73'; Raul Palin 68'; Maria Vivek 87'	Report

Jawaharlal Nehru Stadium, Kochi

3 December 2021
9:30

Andaman and Nicobar	0–9	Kerala
	Report	39', 81' Nijo Gilbert; 45+1', 45+2' Jesin TK; 64' Vibin Thomas; 70' Arjun Jayaraj; 80', 90+3' Md Safnad; 85' Salman Kalliyath

Jawaharlal Nehru Stadium, Kochi

3 December 2021
15:00

Lakshadweep	1–1	Pondicherry
Abdul Hashim 90+4'	Report	17' John Maju

Jawaharlal Nehru Stadium, Kochi

5 December 2021
9:30

Andaman and Nicobar	1–5	Lakshadweep
Y Shiju Raj 90+5'	Report	17' Abdul Hashim K P P; 37', 45+1' Abdul Ameen; 67' Sahil; 82' Abul Hassan

Jawaharlal Nehru Stadium, Kochi

5 December 2021
15:00

Kerala	4–1	Pondicherry
Nijo Gilbert 21'; Arjun Jayaraj 24'; Noufal P.n 55'; Bujair Valiyattu 57'	Report	39' Anson C Anto

Jawaharlal Nehru Stadium, Kochi

== West Zone ==
=== Group A ===
Pos	Team	Pld	W	D	L	GF	GA	GD	Pts	Qualification	GJ	GO	DN	DD
1	Gujarat (H)	3	2	1	0	3	1	+2	7	Final Round	—	—	0–0	2–1
2	Goa	3	2	0	1	7	1	+6	6		0–1	—	5–0	2–0
3	Dadra and Nagar Haveli	3	1	1	1	1	5	−4	4		—	—	—	—
4	Daman and Diu	3	0	0	3	1	5	−4	0		—	—	0–1	—

Source: AIFF
Rules for classification: 1) points; 2) head-to-head points; 3) head-to-head goal difference; 4) goal difference; 5) number of goals scored; 6) drawing of lots
(H) Hosts
24 November 2021
9:30

Gujarat	0–0	Dadra and Nagar Haveli
	Report

Maharaja Krishnakumarsinhji Bhavnagar University Ground, Bhavnagar

24 November 2021
15:00

Goa	2–0	Daman and Diu
Calvin Rosario Baretto 32'; Jovial Dias 55'	Report

Maharaja Krishnakumarsinhji Bhavnagar University Ground, Bhavnagar

26 November 2021
9:30

Gujarat	2–1	Daman and Diu
Prabaldeep Khare 73'; Jay Kanani 79'	Report	4' Zeeshan Akhter

Maharaja Krishnakumarsinhji Bhavnagar University Ground, Bhavnagar

26 November 2021
15:00

Goa	5–0	Dadra and Nagar Haveli
Umang Gaikwad 14'; Suraj Hadkonkar 50', 88'; Kunal Salgaonkar 80', 90+4'	Report

Maharaja Krishnakumarsinhji Bhavnagar University Ground, Bhavnagar

28 November 2021
9:30

Daman and Diu	0–1	Dadra and Nagar Haveli
	Report	58' Vikas Payal

Maharaja Krishnakumarsinhji Bhavnagar University Ground, Bhavnagar

28 November 2021
15:00

Goa	0–1	Gujarat
	Report	32' Prabaldeep Khare

Maharaja Krishnakumarsinhji Bhavnagar University Stadium, Bhavnagar

=== Group B ===
Pos	Team	Pld	W	D	L	GF	GA	GD	Pts	Qualification	RJ	MH	MP
1	Rajasthan (H)	2	1	1	0	3	2	+1	4	Final Round	—	—	—
2	Maharashtra	2	1	0	1	3	1	+2	3		0–1	—	—
3	Madhya Pradesh	2	0	1	1	2	5	−3	1		2–2	0–3	—

Source: AIFF
Rules for classification: 1) points; 2) head-to-head points; 3) head-to-head goal difference; 4) goal difference; 5) number of goals scored; 6) drawing of lots
(H) Hosts
1 December 2021
15:00

Madhya Pradesh	2–2	Rajasthan
Arjun Singh Gautam 31'; Sahil Rajak 65'	Report	Imran Khan 45+1', 75'

Poornima University Ground, Jaipur

3 December 2021
15:00

Madhya Pradesh	0–3	Maharashtra
	Report	58' Advait; 82' Sidharth Colaco; 83' Aimar Adam

Poornima University Ground, Jaipur

5 December 2021
15:00

Maharashtra	0–1	Rajasthan
	Report	90+1' Youraj Singh

Poornima University Ground, Jaipur

== Broadcast ==
- All matches of West Bengal were broadcast on R Plus News TV channel and Aajkaal Facebook page.
- All matches of South Zone Group A and North Zone Group B were broadcast on Sportscast India YouTube channel.
