= James Kithan =

Indian footballer

Personal information
- Full name: James Kithan
- Date of birth: 26 December 1994 (age 31)
- Place of birth: Dimapur, Nagaland, India
- Height: 1.86 m (6 ft 1 in)
- Position: Goalkeeper

Team information
- Current team: Real Kashmir

Senior career*
Years	Team	Apps	(Gls)
- Kohima Komets
- Peerless
2016	Mohammedan	0	(0)
2017	Viva Chennai		
2017–2020	Churchill Brothers	39	(0)
2021	Delhi	4	(0)
2021–2023	Gokulam Kerala	1	(0)
2023–2024	Delhi	0	(0)
2024	Mohammedan	0	(0)
2024–2026	Rajsthan United	13	(0)
2026–	Real Kashmir	0	(0)
- * Club domestic league appearances and goals as of 23:32, 15 May 2025 (UTC)

James Kithan (born 26 December 1994) is an Indian professional footballer who plays as a goalkeeper for Indian Football League club Real Kashmir.

== Career ==
=== Earlier career ===
Born in Dimapur, Nagaland, Kithan began his career in his native state with Kohima Komets. He soon moved to Kolkata to play for Peerless and then, Mohammedan in the Calcutta Football League. In 2017, he once again moved south, this time to join Viva Chennai.

=== Churchill Brothers ===
Kithan joined Churchill Brothers prior to the 2017–18 I-League season. On 2 December 2017, he made his professional debut for the club against Shillong Lajong. Thereby, Kithan became the second player in I-League history to come from Nagaland.

=== Gokulam Kerala ===
Kithan joined Gokulam Kerala in 2021. At first, he played Kerala Premier League with their reserve team. Thereafter, Kithan was promoted to the main team of Gokulam Kerala to play in the I-League.

== Career statistics ==
=== Club ===
As of 15 January 2023

Club	Season	League			Cup		AFC		Total	
Club	Season	Division	Apps	Goals	Apps	Goals	Apps	Goals	Apps	Goals
Churchill Brothers	2017–18	I-League	17	0	0	0	—		17	0
Churchill Brothers	2018–19	I-League	14	0	0	0	—		14	0
Churchill Brothers	2019–20	I-League	8	0	0	0	—		8	0
Churchill Brothers	Total		39	0	0	0	0	0	39	0
Delhi	2021	I-League 2nd Division	4	0	0	0	—		4	0
Gokulam Kerala	2021–22	I-League	0	0	0	0	—		0	0
Gokulam Kerala	2022–23	I-League	1	0	0	0	—		1	0
Gokulam Kerala	Total		1	0	0	0	0	0	1	0
Delhi	2023–24	I-League	0	0	0	0	—		0	0
Career total			44	0	0	0	0	0	44	0

== Honours ==
Gokulam Kerala

- I-League: 2021–22
