= Pawan Kumar (footballer, born 1995) =

Indian footballer

Personal information
- Full name: Pawan Kumar Drall
- Date of birth: 12 May 1995 (age 31)
- Place of birth: Delhi, India
- Height: 1.88 m (6 ft 2 in)
- Position: Centre-back

Team information
- Current team: Kannur Warriors

Youth career
- 2013–2014: AIFF Elite Academy

Senior career*
Years	Team	Apps	(Gls)
2014–2017	Salgaocar	6	(0)
2016–2017	→ Delhi United (loan)	14	(1)
2017–2018	Pune City	0	(0)
2018	→ Churchill Brothers (loan)	4	(0)
2018–2020	NorthEast United	0	(0)
2020–2021	Real Kashmir	7	(0)
2021–2023	Gokulam Kerala	27	(0)
2023–2025	Sreenidi Deccan	14	(2)
2025–	Kannur Warriors		

International career
2013	India U19	4	(0)
- * Club domestic league appearances and goals as of 14:37, 13 April 2024 (UTC)

Pawan Kumar Drall (born 12 May 1995) is an Indian professional footballer who plays as a defender for the Super League Kerala club Kannur Warriors.

== Career ==
A product of the AIFF Academy, Kumar made his professional debut for Salgaocar on 28 December 2014 against Bengaluru FC in the Federation Cup. He started the match as Salgaocar lost 2–3. He also started in his second match in the federation cup which they won 2–1 against shillong lajong. On 23 August 2021 Gokulam Kerala FC announced that he has signed for them on a two-year deal.

== International ==
Kumar has represented the India U19 side.

== Career statistics ==
=== Club ===
As of 18 April 2023

Club	Season	League			League Cup		Domestic Cup		AFC		Others		Total	
Club	Season	Division	Apps	Goals	Apps	Goals	Apps	Goals	Apps	Goals	Apps	Goals	Apps	Goals
Salgaocar	2014–15	I-League	5	0	0	0	0	0	—		0	0	5	0
Salgaocar	2015–16	I-League	1	0	0	0	0	0	—		0	0	1	0
Delhi United (loan)	2016–16	I-League 2nd Division	14	1	0	0	0	0	—		0	0	14	1
Pune City	2017–18	Indian Super League	0	0	0	0	0	0	—		0	0	0	0
Churchill Brothers (loan)	2017–18	I-League	4	0	1 (Note: Appearance(s) in Super Cup)	0	0	0	—		0	0	5	0
NorthEast United	2018–19	Indian Super League	0	0	0	0	0	0	—		0	0	0	0
NorthEast United	2019–20	Indian Super League	0	0	0	0	0	0	—		0	0	0	0
Real Kashmir	2020–21	I-League	7	0	0	0	0	0	—		0	0	7	0
Gokulam Kerala	2021–22	I-League	11	0	0	0	3 (Note: Appearance(s) in Durand Cup)	0	—		0	0	14	0
Gokulam Kerala	2022–23	I-League	16	0	2	0	0	0	—		1 (Note: Appearance(s) in play–offs for AFC Cup)	0	19	0
Gokulam Kerala	Gokulam Kerala total		27	0	2	0	3	0	0	0	1	0	33	0
Sreenidi Deccan	2023–24	I-League	14	2	2	0	0	0	—		0	0	16	2
Career total			72	3	5	0	3	0	0	0	1	0	81	3

== Honours ==
Real Kashmir

- IFA Shield: 2020

Gokulam Kerala

- I-League: 2021–22
