= 2021–22 Santosh Trophy group stage =

The 2021–22 Santosh Trophy group stage is played from 16 April to 25 April. A total of 10 teams contest in the group stage to decide the four places in the semi-finals of the 2021–22 Santosh Trophy.

== Draw ==
The official draw for the 75th edition of Santosh Trophy was held on 6 January 2022 at 15:00 IST in New Delhi with former India defender Gouramangi Singh assisting in the process. Ten teams who came through the qualifiers were drawn into two groups of five each for the main event beginning from 16 April. On 31 March the host of the event was announced to be Malappuram, Kerala, with the final being held at Manjeri Payyanad Stadium.

== Group A ==
=== Points table ===
Pos	Team	Pld	W	D	L	GF	GA	GD	Pts	Qualification	KL	WB	PN	ME	RA
1	Kerala (H)	4	3	1	0	11	3	+8	10	Semi-finals	—	2–0	—	—	5–0
2	West Bengal	4	3	0	1	8	5	+3	9	Semi-finals	—	—	1–0	4–3	—
3	Punjab	4	2	0	2	6	3	+3	6		1–2	—	—	—	4–0
4	Meghalaya	4	1	1	2	8	9	−1	4		2–2	—	0–1	—	—
5	Rajasthan	4	0	0	4	2	15	−13	0		—	0–3	—	2–3	—

Source: AIFF
Rules for classification: 1) points; 2) head-to-head points; 3) head-to-head goal difference; 4) goal difference; 5) number of goals scored; 6) drawing of lots
(H) Hosts

=== Matches ===
16 April 2022
9:30 IST

West Bengal	1–0	Punjab
Subham Bhowmick 61'	Report

Kottappadi Football Stadium

16 April 2022
20:00 IST

Kerala	5–0	Rajasthan
Jijo Joseph 6', 58', 63'; Nijo Gilbert 38'; Ajay Alex 82'	Report

Manjeri Payyanad Stadium

18 April 2022
16:00 IST

Rajasthan	2–3	Meghalaya
Youraj Singh 2'; Imran Khan 56'	Report	Figo Syndai 26', 39'; Hardy Cliff Nongbri 64'

Kottappadi Football Stadium

18 April 2022
20:00 IST

Kerala	2–0	West Bengal
Noufal PN 85'; Jesin Thonikkara 90+2'	Report

Manjeri Payyanad Stadium

20 April 2022
16:00 IST

Punjab	4–0	Rajasthan
Amarpreet Singh 37'; Parmjit Singh 63'; Tarun Slathia 70', 81'	Report

Kottappadi Football Stadium

20 April 2022
20:00 IST

Meghalaya	2–2	Kerala
Kynsaibor Lhuid 40'; Figo Syndai 55'	Report	M Muhammed Safnad 17'; Muhammed Saheef 58'

Manjeri Payyanad Stadium

22 April 2022
16:00 IST

West Bengal	4–3	Meghalaya
Md Fardin Ali Molla 23', 43' (pen.); Mahitosh Roy 49', 69'	Report	Sangti Janai Shianglong 40'; Shano Tariang 46', 65'

Kottappadi Football Stadium

22 April 2022
20:00 IST

Punjab	1–2	Kerala
Manvir Singh 12'	Report	Jijo Joseph 17', 86'

Manjeri Payyanad Stadium

24 April 2022
16:00 IST

Rajasthan	0–3	West Bengal
	Report	Md Fardin Ali Molla 48', 60'; Sujit Singh 81'

Kottappadi Football Stadium

24 April 2022
20:00 IST

Meghalaya	0–1	Punjab
	Report	Amarpreet Singh 47'

Manjeri Payyanad Stadium

== Group B ==
=== Points table ===
Pos	Team	Pld	W	D	L	GF	GA	GD	Pts	Qualification	MN	KA	OD	SE	GJ
1	Manipur	4	3	0	1	8	1	+7	9	Semi-finals	—	—	0–1	3–0	—
2	Karnataka	4	2	1	1	8	6	+2	7	Semi-finals	0–3	—	—	1–0	—
3	Odisha	4	2	1	1	7	7	0	7		—	3–3	—	—	3–2
4	Services	4	2	0	2	5	5	0	6		—	—	2–0	—	3–1
5	Gujarat	4	0	0	4	3	12	−9	0		0–2	0–4	—	—	—

Source: AIFF
Rules for classification: 1) points; 2) head-to-head points; 3) head-to-head goal difference; 4) goal difference; 5) number of goals scored; 6) drawing of lots

=== Matches ===
17 April 2022
16:00 IST

Odisha	3–3	Karnataka
Jamir Oram 15'; Bikash Kumar Sahoo 64'; Chandra Muduli 75'	Report	Sudheer Kotikela 28', 61'; Bavu Nishad 33'

Kottappadi Football Stadium

17 April 2022
20:00 IST

Manipur	3–0	Services
Ngariyanbam Jenish Singh 5'; Lunminlen Haokip 50'; Sunil B 74' (o.g.)	Report

Manjeri Payyanad Stadium

19 April 2022
16:00 IST

Services	3–1	Gujarat
Nikhil Sharma 45'; Tongbram Krishnakanta Singh 50'; Pintu Mahata 85'	Report	Jay Kanani 20'

Kottappadi Football Stadium

19 April 2022
20:00 IST

Manipur	0–1	Odisha
	Report	Kartik Hantal 37'

Manjeri Payyanad Stadium

21 April 2022
16:00 IST

Gujarat	0–2	Manipur
	Report	Sudhir Laitonjam 48'; Siddharth Suresh Nair 67' (o.g.)

Kottappadi Football Stadium

21 April 2022
20:00 IST

Karnataka	1–0	Services
Ankith P 38'	Report

Manjeri Payyanad Stadium

23 April 2022
16:00 IST

Karnataka	0–3	Manipur
	Report	Lunminlen Haokip 19', 42'; Somishon Shirak 44'

Kottappadi Football Stadium

23 April 2022
20:00 IST

Odisha	3–2	Gujarat
Chandra Muduli 37', 88'; Raisen Tudu 89'	Report	Prabaldeep Khare 89'; Jay Kanani 90+6' (pen.)

Manjeri Payyanad Stadium

25 April 2022
16:00 IST

Services	2–0	Odisha
Vivek Kumar 74'; Nikhil Sharma 82'	Report

Kottappadi Football Stadium

25 April 2022
20:00 IST

Gujarat	0–4	Karnataka
	Report	Sudheer Kotikela 12', 29'; Kamalesh P 28'; Magesh Selva 60'

Manjeri Payyanad Stadium
