= Vikas Singh Saini =

Indian footballer

Personal information
- Full name: Vikas Singh Saini
- Date of birth: 2 July 1996 (age 30)
- Place of birth: Badli, Haryana, India
- Height: 1.89 m (6 ft 2 in)
- Position: Right back

Team information
- Current team: Kannur Warriors
- Number: 46

Youth career
- East Bengal

Senior career*
Years	Team	Apps	(Gls)
- Mohun Bagan
2016–2017	Hindustan	3	(0)
2019–2020	BSS Sporting Club		
2020	Mohammedan	3	(0)
2020	East Bengal	0	(0)
2020–2022	Churchill Brothers	19	(0)
2022–2024	Gokulam Kerala	23	(0)
2024–	Kannur Warriors		
- * Club domestic league appearances and goals as of 27 August 2024

Vikas Singh Saini (born 2 July 1996) is an Indian professional footballer who plays as a defender for the Super League Kerala club Kannur Warriors.

== Club career ==
Saini began his career as part of the youth team at then I-League club East Bengal. He then moved to Mohun Bagan and played for the club in the Calcutta Football League. He then joined BSS Sporting Club before joining I-League 2nd Division side Hindustan. Prior to the 2019–20 season, Saini joined Mohammedan before re-signing with East Bengal in May 2020.

=== Churchill Brothers ===
In January 2021, Saini joined I-League club Churchill Brothers. He made his debut for the club on 14 January 2021 against Mohammedan, starting in the club's 0–0 draw.

=== Gokulam Kerala ===
on 15 September saini joined I-League club Gokulam Kerala.

== Career statistics ==
=== Club ===
As of 17 March 2024

Club	Season	League			League Cup		Domestic Cup		AFC		Others		Total	
Club	Season	Division	Apps	Goals	Apps	Goals	Apps	Goals	Apps	Goals	Apps	Goals	Apps	Goals
Hindustan	2016–17	I-League 2nd Division	3	0	0	0	0	0	—		0	0	3	0
Mohammedan	2019–20	I-League 2nd Division	3	0	0	0	0	0	—		0	0	3	0
Churchill Brothers	2020–21	I-League	9	0	0	0	0	0	—		0	0	9	0
Churchill Brothers	2021–22	I-League	10	0	0	0	0	0	—		0	0	10	0
Churchill Brothers	Churchill total		19	0	0	0	0	0	0	0	0	0	19	0
Gokulam Kerala	2022–23	I-League	12	0	3 (Note: Appearance(s) in Super Cup)	0	0	0	—		1 (Note: Appearance(s) in play–offs for AFC Cup)	0	16	0
Gokulam Kerala	2023–24	I-League	10	0	2	0	3 (Note: Appearance(s) in Durand Cup)	0	—		0	0	15	0
Gokulam Kerala	Gokulam Kerala total		23	0	5	0	3	0	0	0	1	0	32	0
Career total			48	0	5	0	3	0	0	0	1	0	57	0
