= 2021–22 Santosh Trophy =

Senior Men's National Football Championship

Tournament details
- Country: India
- Venue(s): Manjeri, Malappuram, Kerala
- Dates: Qualifiers: 21 November – 5 December 2021; Main: 16 April – 2 May 2022
- Teams: Qualifiers: 37; Main: 10

Final positions
- Champions: Kerala (7th title)
- Runner-up: West Bengal

Tournament statistics
- Matches played: 73
- Goals scored: 226 (3.1 per match)
- Top goal scorer(s): Jesin TK (Kerala) (9 goals)

Awards
- Best player: Jijo Joseph (Kerala)
- Best goalkeeper: Priyant Singh (West Bengal)

The 2021–22 Santosh Trophy was the 75th edition of the Santosh Trophy, the premier competition in India for teams representing their regional and state football associations. The last season was cancelled due to COVID-19 pandemic in India.

The main round of the tournament was held in Manjeri, and was contested by 10 teams divided into two groups. Kerala and West Bengal from Group A and Manipur and Karnataka from Group B reached the semi-finals, and eventually Kerala and West Bengal faced in the final. Kerala won their seventh title after defeating West Bengal in the penalties.

== Qualification ==
The zonal qualifiers were contested by 37 teams representing the states and the union territories of India, including one representing the Indian Armed Forces. The teams were drawn into five zones (North, East, North-East, South and West) of two groups each. Only 2 teams (1 from each group) from each zone could qualify for the final round.

=== North ===
Pos	Team	Pld	W	D	L	GF	GA	GD	Pts	Qualification	SE	CH	UP	JK	HP
1	Services	4	4	0	0	10	0	+10	12	Final Round	—	—	2–0	—	3–0
2	Chandigarh (H)	4	1	2	1	3	3	0	5		0–2	—	0–0	—	—
3	Uttar Pradesh	4	1	2	1	2	3	−1	5		—	—	—	1–1	1–0
4	Jammu and Kashmir	4	1	2	1	5	7	−2	5		0–3	1–1	—	—	—
5	Himachal Pradesh	4	0	0	4	2	9	−7	0		—	0–2	—	2–3	—

Source: AIFF
Rules for classification: 1) points; 2) head-to-head points; 3) head-to-head goal difference; 4) goal difference; 5) number of goals scored; 6) drawing of lots
(H) Hosts

Pos	Team	Pld	W	D	L	GF	GA	GD	Pts	Qualification	PU	DE	HA	UT
1	Punjab	3	3	0	0	14	0	+14	9	Final Round	—	1–0	2–0	—
2	Delhi (H)	3	2	0	1	15	2	+13	6		—	—	—	11–1
3	Haryana	3	1	0	2	6	6	0	3		—	0–4	—	6–0
4	Uttarakhand	3	0	0	3	1	28	−27	0		0–11	—	—	—

Source: AIFF
Rules for classification: 1) points; 2) head-to-head points; 3) head-to-head goal difference; 4) goal difference; 5) number of goals scored; 6) drawing of lots
(H) Hosts

=== East ===
Pos	Team	Pld	W	D	L	GF	GA	GD	Pts	Qualification	OD	JH	BH
1	Odisha (H)	2	1	1	0	6	1	+5	4	Final Round	—	—	5–0
2	Jharkhand	2	1	1	0	3	1	+2	4		1–1	—	—
3	Bihar	2	0	0	2	0	7	−7	0		—	0–2	—

Source: AIFF
Rules for classification: 1) points; 2) head-to-head points; 3) head-to-head goal difference; 4) goal difference; 5) number of goals scored; 6) drawing of lots
(H) Hosts

Pos	Team	Pld	W	D	L	GF	GA	GD	Pts	Qualification	WB	SK	CG
1	West Bengal (H)	2	2	0	0	3	0	+3	6	Final Round	—	0–1	—
2	Sikkim	2	1	0	1	2	1	+1	3		—	—	2–0
3	Chhattisgarh	2	0	0	2	0	4	−4	0		0–2	—	—

Source: AIFF
Rules for classification: 1) points; 2) head-to-head points; 3) head-to-head goal difference; 4) goal difference; 5) number of goals scored; 6) drawing of lots
(H) Hosts

=== North-East ===
Pos	Team	Pld	W	D	L	GF	GA	GD	Pts	Qualification	ME	AP	AS
1	Meghalaya (H)	2	2	0	0	8	2	+6	6	Final Round	—	2–0	—
2	Arunachal Pradesh	2	0	1	1	0	2	−2	1		—	—	0–0
3	Assam	2	0	1	1	2	6	−4	1		2–6	—	—

Source: AIFF
Rules for classification: 1) points; 2) head-to-head points; 3) head-to-head goal difference; 4) goal difference; 5) number of goals scored; 6) drawing of lots
(H) Hosts

Pos	Team	Pld	W	D	L	GF	GA	GD	Pts	Qualification	MA	MZ	NA	TR
1	Manipur (H)	3	2	0	1	4	2	+2	6	Final Round	—	1–0	3–0	0–2
2	Mizoram	3	2	0	1	2	1	+1	6		—	—	1–0	1–0
3	Nagaland	3	1	0	2	6	4	+2	3		—	—	—	—
4	Tripura	3	1	0	2	2	7	−5	3		—	—	0–6	—

Source: AIFF
Rules for classification: 1) points; 2) head-to-head points; 3) head-to-head goal difference; 4) goal difference; 5) number of goals scored; 6) drawing of lots
(H) Hosts

=== South ===
Pos	Team	Pld	W	D	L	GF	GA	GD	Pts	Qualification	KA	TN	TL	AP
1	Karnataka (H)	3	3	0	0	7	0	+7	9	Final Round	—	4–0	—	1–0
2	Tamil Nadu	3	2	0	1	2	4	−2	6		—	—	—	1–0
3	Telangana	3	1	0	2	4	3	+1	3		0–2	0–1	—	4–0
4	Andhra Pradesh	3	0	0	3	0	6	−6	0		—	—	—	—

Source: AIFF
Rules for classification: 1) points; 2) head-to-head points; 3) head-to-head goal difference; 4) goal difference; 5) number of goals scored; 6) drawing of lots
(H) Hosts

Pos	Team	Pld	W	D	L	GF	GA	GD	Pts	Qualification	KE	PO	LK	AN
1	Kerala (H)	3	3	0	0	18	1	+17	9	Final Round	—	4–1	5–0	—
2	Pondicherry	3	1	1	1	10	5	+5	4		—	—	—	8–0
3	Lakshadweep	3	1	1	1	6	7	−1	4		—	1–1	—	—
4	Andaman and Nicobar	3	0	0	3	1	22	−21	0		0–9	—	1–5	—

Source: AIFF
Rules for classification: 1) points; 2) head-to-head points; 3) head-to-head goal difference; 4) goal difference; 5) number of goals scored; 6) drawing of lots
(H) Hosts

=== West ===
Pos	Team	Pld	W	D	L	GF	GA	GD	Pts	Qualification	GJ	GO	DN	DD
1	Gujarat (H)	3	2	1	0	3	1	+2	7	Final Round	—	—	0–0	2–1
2	Goa	3	2	0	1	7	1	+6	6		0–1	—	5–0	2–0
3	Dadra and Nagar Haveli	3	1	1	1	1	5	−4	4		—	—	—	—
4	Daman and Diu	3	0	0	3	1	5	−4	0		—	—	0–1	—

Source: AIFF
Rules for classification: 1) points; 2) head-to-head points; 3) head-to-head goal difference; 4) goal difference; 5) number of goals scored; 6) drawing of lots
(H) Hosts

Pos	Team	Pld	W	D	L	GF	GA	GD	Pts	Qualification	RJ	MH	MP
1	Rajasthan (H)	2	1	1	0	3	2	+1	4	Final Round	—	—	—
2	Maharashtra	2	1	0	1	3	1	+2	3		0–1	—	—
3	Madhya Pradesh	2	0	1	1	2	5	−3	1		2–2	0–3	—

Source: AIFF
Rules for classification: 1) points; 2) head-to-head points; 3) head-to-head goal difference; 4) goal difference; 5) number of goals scored; 6) drawing of lots
(H) Hosts

== Draw ==
The official draw for the 75th edition of Santosh Trophy was held on 6 January 2022 at 15:00 IST in New Delhi with former India defender Gouramangi Singh assisting in the process. Ten teams who came through the qualifiers were drawn into two groups of five each for the main event beginning from 16 April. On 31 March the host of the event was announced to be Malappuram, Kerala, with the matches being held at Kottappadi Stadium and Payyanad Stadium.

== Group stage ==
=== Group A ===
Pos	Team	Pld	W	D	L	GF	GA	GD	Pts	Qualification	KL	WB	PN	ME	RA
1	Kerala (H)	4	3	1	0	11	3	+8	10	Semi-finals	—	2–0	—	—	5–0
2	West Bengal	4	3	0	1	8	5	+3	9	Semi-finals	—	—	1–0	4–3	—
3	Punjab	4	2	0	2	6	3	+3	6		1–2	—	—	—	4–0
4	Meghalaya	4	1	1	2	8	9	−1	4		2–2	—	0–1	—	—
5	Rajasthan	4	0	0	4	2	15	−13	0		—	0–3	—	2–3	—

Source: AIFF
Rules for classification: 1) points; 2) head-to-head points; 3) head-to-head goal difference; 4) goal difference; 5) number of goals scored; 6) drawing of lots
(H) Hosts

=== Group B ===
Pos	Team	Pld	W	D	L	GF	GA	GD	Pts	Qualification	MN	KA	OD	SE	GJ
1	Manipur	4	3	0	1	8	1	+7	9	Semi-finals	—	—	0–1	3–0	—
2	Karnataka	4	2	1	1	8	6	+2	7	Semi-finals	0–3	—	—	1–0	—
3	Odisha	4	2	1	1	7	7	0	7		—	3–3	—	—	3–2
4	Services	4	2	0	2	5	5	0	6		—	—	2–0	—	3–1
5	Gujarat	4	0	0	4	3	12	−9	0		0–2	0–4	—	—	—

Source: AIFF
Rules for classification: 1) points; 2) head-to-head points; 3) head-to-head goal difference; 4) goal difference; 5) number of goals scored; 6) drawing of lots

== Knockout stage ==
=== Bracket ===
Semi-finals
28 April 2022
Kerala	7
Karnataka	3
29 April 2022
West Bengal	3
Manipur	0

Final
2 May 2022
Kerala (p)	1 (5)
West Bengal	1 (4)

=== Semi-finals ===
28 April 2022
20:00 IST

Kerala	7–3	Karnataka
Jesin TK 35', 42', 45', 56', 74'; Shigil 45+1'; Arjun Jayaraj 61'	Report	Sudheer Kotikela 25'; Kamalesh P 54'; Solaimalai N 72'

Manjeri Payyanad Stadium

29 April 2022
20:00 IST

West Bengal	3–0	Manipur
Sujit Singh 2'; Md Fardin Ali Molla 7'; Dilip Oran 74'	Report

Manjeri Payyanad Stadium

=== Final ===
2 May 2022
20:00 IST

Kerala	1–1 (a.e.t.)	West Bengal
Safnad 116'	Report	Dilip Orawn 97'
Penalties
Sanju G. (penalty scored); Bibin Ajayan (penalty scored); Jijo Joseph (penalty scored); Jesin TK (penalty scored); Faslurahman Methukayil (penalty scored)	5–4	Dilip Orawn (penalty scored); Sajal Bag (penalty missed); Bablu Oran (penalty scored); Tanmoy Ghosh (penalty scored); Priyant Singh (penalty scored)

Manjeri Payyanad Stadium
Referee: Umesh Bora (India)

== Statistics ==
=== Top goalscorer ===
Rank	Player	Team	Goal(s)
1	Jesin TK	Kerala	9
2	Sudheer Kotikela	Karnataka	8
3	Md. Fardin Ali Molla	West Bengal	6
3	Amarpreet Singh	Punjab	6
5	Chandra Muduli	Odisha	5
Source: AIFF

== Prize money ==
Title	Amount
Hero of the tournament	₹25,000
Top scorer	₹25,000
Top goalkeeper	₹25,000
Champion	₹5,00,000
Runner-up	₹3,00,000

== Awards ==
Award	Player	Team
Top Scorer of the Championship	Jesin TK	Kerala
Best Goalkeeper of the Championship	Priyant Singh	West Bengal
Hero of the Championship	Jijo Joseph	Kerala
