= Shilton D'Silva =

Indian footballer (born 1992)

Personal information
- Full name: Shilton Sydney D'Silva
- Date of birth: 15 September 1992 (age 34)
- Place of birth: Mumbai, Maharashtra
- Height: 1.77 m (5 ft 9 1/2 in)
- Position: Midfielder

Team information
- Current team: Gokulam Kerala
- Number: 18

Youth career
- 2007–2010: Mahindra United

Senior career*
Years	Team	Apps	(Gls)
2010–2013	Indian Arrows	9	(5)
2014–2015	Bengaluru		
2015	→ Mumbai FC (loan)		
2016–2017	Mumbai FC		
2017–2020	Mohun Bagan	21	(1)
2021	Mohammedan	7	(0)
2021–2023	Rajasthan United	11	(0)
2023–	Gokulam Kerala		

International career
2008	India U16		
2009	India U19		
2011	India U23	4	(0)
2011–	India	3	(0)
- * Club domestic league appearances and goals

Shilton Sydney D'Silva (born 15 September 1992) is an Indian professional footballer who plays as a midfielder for Gokulam Kerala in the I-League.

== Career ==
=== Early career ===
Born in Mumbai (Bombay), D'Silva was discovered playing football for his school team, the St Pius X High School (Bombay), shortly thereafter he was selected to play for state-level tournaments in the Maharashtra U14 team. After playing for the state during a 10-day football festival, D'Silva joined the youth set-up of I-League side Mahindra United. While with Mahindra United, D'Silva played for the under-15 side in the Manchester United Premier Cup. Then, when Mahindra United U15s played against the India U16 side D'Silva was spotted by youth coach Colm Toal and was thus selected to join the India youth set-up.

=== Pailan Arrows ===
In 2010, after the disbanding of Mahindra United, D'Silva was selected to play for the Pailan Arrows, then known as AIFF XI, of the I-League. This team would be a team full of under-23 players in preparation for the 2018 FIFA World Cup. D'Silva made his professional debut for AIFF XI on 1 December 2010 against Chirag United in which AIFF XI fell 1–2 in their first ever game. He then scored his first professional goal on 22 December 2010 against Air India FC. His 34th-minute strike helped AIFF XI win 2–1. He then scored his second goal of the season against Dempo with a 10th-minute goal that lead to a 1–1 draw against the champions.

On 20 December 2011, during a Federation Cup (India) match against Mumbai FC, D'Silva suffered an ACL tear. This injury lead him to miss the 2011–12 I-League season. After a year out, D'Silva rejoined the team in November 2012, however, in a friendly match against Mohammedan, challenge by Phoolchand Hembram left D'Silva with a broken tibia and fibula. This led to another surgery which meant that D'Silva would miss the 2012–13 I-League season, the last ever season for Pailan Arrows.

=== Rehab ===
After the disbandment of Pailan Arrows, D'Silva took a break from football to focus on his education and finish his exams. After completing graduation, former India national under-19 football team head coach, Colm Toal, recommended D'Silva to complete his rehab at the AIFF Academy in Goa. D'Silva said "The rehab went perfectly. I will remain indebted for life to the physiotherapists who helped me there. AIFF took care of all my expenses and Colm has also always been a pillar of support".

=== Bengaluru FC ===
Before the 2014–15 season, D'Silva was signed by reigning I-League champions Bengaluru FC.

==== Mumbai FC (loan) ====
On 31 March 2015, D'Silva signed for fellow I-League club Mumbai FC on loan from Bengaluru FC. He appeared on the bench for the team on 3 April against Shillong Lajong. He did not play as Mumbai fell 6–0. D'Silva then made his first professional appearance in four years on 22 April against Sporting Goa. He came on as an 85th-minute substitute for Climax Lawrence as Mumbai drew 1–1.

After the season finished, D'Silva returned to his parent club before being released. However, soon after being released, it was announced that D'Silva would be available for selection during the 2014 Indian Super League domestic draft.

=== Mumbai ===
On 27 February 2016, D'Silva made another return to professional football, appearing on the bench for Mumbai in an I-League match against Sporting Goa.

On 6 December 2016 D'Silva made his season debut for Mumbai in their opening MDFA Elite Division match against Mumbai Customs. D'Silva started the match as Mumbai came out 8–3 winners.

=== Mohun Bagan ===
On 24 July 2017 it was announced that D'Silva had signed with I-League side Mohun Bagan. He made his debut for the club in their opening I-League match on 25 November 2017 against Minerva Punjab. He started and played the whole match as Mohun Bagan drew 1–1.

=== Mohammedan SC ===
Mohammedan SC (Kolkata) signed Shilton D'Silva from Mohun Bagan on January 4, 2021, for I-league season 2020–21.

== International ==
After playing for Mahindra United U15 against the India U16 side, D'Silva was spotted and selected by Colm Toal to join the India youth set-up. He represented the India U16 side during the 2008 AFC U-16 Championship and then participated with the India U19 side during the qualifiers for the 2010 AFC U-19 Championship. On 23 February 2011, D'Silva made his debut for the India U23 team against Myanmar U23 during the 2012 Summer Olympics qualifiers.

D'Silva then made his debut for the India senior team on 21 March 2011 against Chinese Taipei in the 2012 AFC Challenge Cup qualifiers. He came on a substitute for Rakesh Masih as India won 3–0.

== Career statistics ==
As of 25 November 2017

Club	Season	League			League Cup		Domestic Cup		Other		AFC		Total	
Club	Season	Division	Apps	Goals	Apps	Goals	Apps	Goals	Apps	Goals	Apps	Goals	Apps	Goals
Pailan Arrows	2010–11	I-League	9	5	2	0	0	0	0	0	—	—	11	5
Pailan Arrows	2011–12	I-League	0	0	2	0	0	0	0	0	—	—	2	0
Pailan Arrows	2012–13	I-League	0	0	0	0	0	0	0	0	—	—	0	0
Pailan Arrows	Total		9	5	4	0	0	0	0	0	0	0	13	5
Bengaluru FC	2014–15	I-League	0	0	0	0	0	0	0	0	0	0	0	0
Mumbai (loan)	2014–15	I-League	4	0	0	0	0	0	0	0	—	—	4	0
Mumbai	2015–16	I-League	1	0	—	—	0	0	0	0	—	—	1	0
Mumbai	2016–17	I-League	5	0	0	0	—	—	1	0	—	—	6	0
Mohun Bagan	2017–18	I-League	5	0	0	0	0	0	0	0	0	0	5	0
Career total			24	5	4	0	0	0	1	0	0	0	29	5

== Honours ==
Bengaluru FC

- Federation Cup: 2014–15

Mohun Bagan

- I-League: 2019–20
- Calcutta Football League: 2018–19
- Sikkim Gold Cup: 2017

Rajasthan United

- Baji Rout Cup: 2022
