= Sajad Hussain Parray =

Indian footballer (born 2003)

Sajad Parray
Personal information
- Full name: Sajad Hussain Parray
- Date of birth: 25 April 2003 (age 23)
- Place of birth: Jammu and Kashmir, India
- Position: Right back

Team information
- Current team: Inter Kashi
- Number: 6

Youth career
- J&K State Football Academy

Senior career*
Years	Team	Apps	(Gls)
2020–2022	Indian Arrows	22	(2)
2023–2024	Hyderabad	11	(1)
2023	→ Gokulam Kerala (loan)	1	(0)
2024–2026	Mohammedan	17	(0)
2026–	Inter Kashi	2	(0)

International career^{‡}
2022–	India U20	1	(0)
- * Club domestic league appearances and goals as of 17 October 2026 ‡ National team caps and goals as of 23:34, 16 October 2022 (UTC)

Sajad Hussain Parray (born 25 April 2003) is an Indian professional footballer who plays as a defender for Indian Super League club Inter Kashi.

== Career ==
Parray made his professional club appearance for Indian Arrows on 10 January 2021 against Churchill Brothers in the I-League. Sajad also played for Indian Super League club Hyderabad FC.

=== Mohammedan ===
On 24 August 2024, Mohammedan announced the signing of Parray on a five-year deal, following a ruling by the AIFF's Players’ Status Committee that allowed him to seek a new club due to unpaid dues from Hyderabad.

On 26 October 2024, he made his debut against his former club, Hyderabad, in a match that concluded with a 4–0 defeat.

== Career statistics ==
=== Club ===
As of 24 April 2025

Club	Season	League			National Cup		League Cup		AFC		Total	
Club	Season	Division	Apps	Goals	Apps	Goals	Apps	Goals	Apps	Goals	Apps	Goals
Indian Arrows	2020–21	I-League	10	1	–		–		–		10	1
Indian Arrows	2021–22	I-League	12	1	–		–		–		12	1
Indian Arrows	Total		22	2	0	0	0	0	0	0	22	2
Hyderabad	2023–24	Indian Super League	11	1	2 (Note: Appearance(s) in Super Cup)	0	3 (Note: Appearance(s) in Durand Cup)	0	–		16	1
Gokulam Kerala (loan)	2022–23	I-League	1	0	–		–		–		1	0
Mohammedan	2024–25	Indian Super League	5	0	1	0	–		–		6	0
Career total			39	3	3	0	3	0	0	0	45	3

== Honours ==
India U20

- SAFF U-20 Championship: 2022
