= Jijo Joseph =

Indian footballer

Personal information
- Full name: Jijo Joseph Tutu
- Date of birth: 10 April 1992 (age 34)
- Place of birth: Thrissur, Kerala, India
- Height: 1.75 m (5 ft 9 in)
- Position: Midfielder

Senior career*
Years	Team	Apps	(Gls)
–2021	SBI FT		
2021–2022	Kerala SEB		
2022–2023	Kickstart FC		
2023	Gokulam Kerala	4	(1)
2023	Bhawanipore FC		
2024	Calicut FC	7	(0)
2025	FC Kerala		
- * Club domestic league appearances and goals

Jijo Joseph Tutu (born 10 April 1992) is an Indian professional footballer who plays as a midfielder.

== Career ==
He captained the Kerala state football team for the Santosh Trophy in 2022, and won the player of the tournament award for his performance.

He worked as a clerk for the State Bank of India and earlier played for their departmental team. He was candidate to sign for East Bengal FC after securing a release from his department. Gokulam Kerala announced his signing on 30 January 2023.

== Honours ==
Kerala

- Santosh Trophy: 2021–22

Calicut FC

- Super League Kerala: 2024
