= Punjab football team =

Punjab football team may refer to:

== Association Football ==
- Punjab football team (India)
- Punjab football team (Pakistan)
- Panjab football team
