= Rajasthan football team =

Indian state football team

Rajasthan
- Full name: Rajasthan football team
- Founded: 1941; 85 years ago (as Rajputana football team)
- Ground: Various
- Owner: Rajasthan Football Association
- Head coach: Satish Jangir
- League: Santosh Trophy
- 2024–25: Final round
Home colours	Away colours	Third colours

The Rajasthan football team, also earlier the Rajputana football team, is an Indian football team representing Rajasthan in Indian state football competitions including the Santosh Trophy. They made history by qualify for the final rounds of 75th Santosh Trophy (2022), but failed to win it.

== Team ==
The following players were called up prior to the 2022 Santosh Trophy

Note: Flags indicate national team as defined under FIFA eligibility rules; some limited exceptions apply. Players may hold more than one non-FIFA nationality.

No.	Pos.	Nation	Player
1	GK	IND	Maninder Singh
4	DF	IND	Karamjit Gurjar
3	DF	IND	Altaf Hussain (captain)
—	DF	IND	Karan Ghavri
—	DF	IND	Ankit Sharma
—	DF	IND	Dasrath Singh
—	DF	IND	Vikash Choudhary
—	MF	IND	Yash Tripathi
—	MF	IND	Rajesh
—	MF	IND	Gajendra Singh Meena

No.	Pos.	Nation	Player
—	MF	IND	Jayesh Kumar
—	MF	IND	Bhawani Pratap Singh
—	MF	IND	Rijwan Mansuri
—	FW	IND	Ishan
—	FW	IND	Trilok Singh
—	FW	IND	Shivam Bhaker
—	FW	IND	Bhawani Pratap Singh
—		IND	Narendra Choudhary
—		IND	Sourabh Yadav

== Honours ==
=== State (youth) ===
- B.C. Roy Trophy
  - Winners (1): 1963–64
- Mir Iqbal Hussain Trophy
  - Winners (1): 1991–92
