= 1999–2000 Santosh Trophy =

National Football Championship

Tournament details
- Country: India
- Dates: 9 – 23 April 2000
- Teams: 8

Final positions
- Champions: Maharashtra (4th title)
- Runners-up: Kerala

Tournament statistics
- Matches played: 10
- Goals scored: 48 (4.8 per match)
- Top goal scorer(s): Mohammed Najeeb (9 goals)

Awards
- Best player: Aqueel Ansari

The 1999–2000 Santosh Trophy was the 56th edition of the Santosh Trophy, the main State competition for football in India. It was held from 9 to 23 April 2000 in Thrissur and Chalakudy, Kerala. Twenty-eight teams from all over the country were supposed to take part in the national state championships, but six pulled out. Maharashtra beat the home team of Kerala 1–0 in the final.

== Qualified teams ==
The following eight teams qualified for the Santosh Trophy proper.

- Goa
- Kerala
- Karnataka
- Maharashtra
- Punjab
- Services
- Tamil Nadu
- Bengal

== Group stage ==
=== Group A ===
Pos	Team	Pld	W	D	L	GF	GA	GD	Pts	Qualification
1	Kerala	3	2	1	0	8	4	+4	7	Advance to Semi-finals
2	Bengal	3	1	2	0	7	3	+4	5	Advance to Semi-finals
3	Karnataka	3	0	2	1	4	5	−1	2	
4	Services	3	0	1	2	3	10	−7	1	

Updated to match(es) played on unknown. Source:
Rules for classification: 1) points; 2) goal difference; 3) goals scored; 4) head-to-head result.

10 April 2000	Bengal	2–2	Karnataka	Thrissur
	Dipankar Roy 1'; Raman Vijayan 73'	Report	Sunil Kumar 79'; RC Prakash 88'	Stadium: Municipal Corporation Stadium

11 April 2000	Kerala	5–2	Services	Thrissur
	Sylvester Ignatius 6'; Saheer 43', 60', 62', 69'	Report	Preetam Bahadur 20'; Johnny Gangmei 54'	Stadium: Municipal Corporation Stadium

13 April 2000	Bengal	4–0	Services	Thrissur
18:00 IST	Raman Vijayan 51', 74'; James Singh 57', 81'	Report		Stadium: Municipal Corporation Stadium

14 April 2000	Kerala	2–1	Karnataka	Thrissur
	K. Naushad 5'; I. M. Vijayan 41' (pen.)	Report	RC Prakash 67'	Stadium: Municipal Corporation Stadium

16 April 2000	Services	1–1	Karnataka	Thrissur
	Preetam Bahadur 44'	Report	Murali 28' (pen.)	Stadium: Municipal Corporation Stadium

16 April 2000	Kerala	1–1	Bengal	Thrissur
	B. Edison 82'	Report	RP Singh 36'	Stadium: Municipal Corporation Stadium

=== Group B ===
Pos	Team	Pld	W	D	L	GF	GA	GD	Pts	Qualification
1	Maharashtra	3	2	1	0	7	1	+6	7	Advance to Semi-finals
2	Goa	3	1	2	0	6	3	+3	5	Advance to Semi-finals
3	Punjab	3	0	2	1	3	5	−2	2	
4	Tamil Nadu	3	0	1	2	1	8	−7	1	

Updated to match(es) played on unknown. Source:
Rules for classification: 1) points; 2) goal difference; 3) goals scored; 4) head-to-head result.

9 April 2000	Tamil Nadu	1–1	Punjab	Thrissur
	Pasha 79'	Report	Sukhjit Singh 90'	Stadium: Municipal Corporation Stadium

11 April 2000	Tamil Nadu	0–4	Maharashtra	Thrissur
		Report	Mohammed Najeeb 2'; Jamil 8'; Khalid Siddique 17'; Moosa 68' (pen.)	Stadium: Municipal Corporation Stadium

12 April 2000	Goa	2–2	Punjab	Thrissur
	Francis Silveira 33'; D'Cunha 71'	Report	Sukhjit Singh 45', 89'	Stadium: Municipal Corporation Stadium

14 April 2000	Punjab	0–2	Maharashtra	Thrissur
		Report	Mohammed Najeeb 75', 87'	Stadium: Municipal Corporation Stadium

15 April 2000	Tamil Nadu	0–3	Goa	Thrissur
18:00 IST		Report	D'Cunha 24', 26'; Coutinho 88'	Stadium: Municipal Corporation Stadium

17 April 2000	Goa	1–1	Maharashtra	Thrissur
18:00 IST	Soares 58'	Report	Bungo Singh 75'	Stadium: Municipal Corporation Stadium; Referee: S. Sujauddin

== Knockout stage ==
=== Bracket ===
Semi-finals
19 April 2000
Kerala	2
Goa	0
20 April 2000
Maharashtra	3
Bengal	1

Final
23 April 2000
Kerala	0
Maharashtra	1

=== Semi-finals ===
19 April 2000
18:00 IST

Kerala	2–0	Goa
Sylvester Ignatius 40', 66'	Report Archived 2022-04-26 at the Wayback Machine(subscription required)

Municipal Corporation Stadium, Thrissur
Referee: Udayan Halder (West Bengal)

20 April 2000
18:00 IST

Maharashtra	3–1	Bengal
Manjit Singh 32'; Moosa 45' (pen.); Bungo Singh 87'	Report Archived 2022-04-26 at the Wayback Machine(subscription required)	Raman Vijayan 36'

Municipal Corporation Stadium, Thrissur
Referee: Michael Andrews (Kerala)

=== Third place play-off ===
22 April 2000

Bengal	2–0	Goa
Dharamjit Singh 20' (o.g.); James Singh 20'	Report

Municipal Corporation Stadium, Thrissur

=== Final ===
23 April 2000
18:00 IST

Kerala	0–1	Maharashtra
	Report Archived 2022-04-24 at the Wayback Machine(subscription required)	Mohammed Najeeb 20'

Municipal Corporation Stadium, Thrissur
Referee: Udayan Halder (West Bengal)

== Statistics ==
=== Goalscorers ===
9 goals

- Mohammed Najeeb (Maharashtra)

== Awards ==
- Fair Play Trophy: Kerala
- Man of Tournament: Aqueel Ansari (Maharashtra)
- Best Goalkeeper: Virender Singh (Maharashtra)
- Best Defender: Jo Paul Ancheri (Kerala)
- Best Midfielder: Khalid Jamil (Maharashtra)
- Best Striker: Sylvester Ignatius (Kerala)
