= 2019–20 Santosh Trophy qualification =

Tournament details
- Country: India
- Teams: 35

Tournament statistics
- Matches played: 47
- Goals scored: 190 (4.04 per match)
- All statistics correct as of 9 November 2019.

The 2019–20 Hero Santosh Trophy qualifiers was the qualifying round for the 2019–20 Santosh Trophy, the premier competition in India for teams representing their regional and state football associations.

== East Zone ==
The East Zone matches of the Santosh Trophy will be held at Kalyani, West Bengal.

=== Group A ===
Pos	Team	Pld	W	D	L	GF	GA	GD	Pts	Qualification
1	West Bengal (H)	2	1	0	1	4	1	+3	3	Advance to Final Round
2	Odisha	2	1	0	1	6	5	+1	3	
3	Bihar	2	1	0	1	2	6	−4	3	

Rules for classification: 1) points; 2) head-to-head points; 3) head-to-head goal difference; 4) goal difference; 5) number of goals scored; 6) drawing of lots
(H) Hosts

22 September 2019	Odisha	6–1	Bihar	Kalyani, West Bengal
	Rajesh Nayak 29', 56', 60', 90+2'; Arpan Lakra 34'; Vicky Sethi 41'		Goal	Stadium: Kalyani Stadium

24 September 2019	Bihar	1–0	West Bengal	Kalyani, West Bengal
	Md. Sarfaraz 15'			Stadium: Kalyani Stadium

26 September 2019	West Bengal	4–0	Odisha	Kalyani, West Bengal
	Arjun Tudu 7', 63'; Surojit Seal 54'; Md Farid 56'			Stadium: Kalyani Stadium; Referee: K Ramdasan (India)

=== Group B ===
Pos	Team	Pld	W	D	L	GF	GA	GD	Pts	Qualification
1	Jharkhand	2	1	0	1	5	4	+1	3	Advance to Final Round
2	Chhattisgarh	2	1	0	1	4	5	−1	3	

Rules for classification: 1) points; 2) head-to-head points; 3) head-to-head goal difference; 4) goal difference; 5) number of goals scored; 6) drawing of lots

25 September 2019	Chhattisgarh	3–2	Jharkhand	Kalyani, West Bengal
				Stadium: Kalyani Stadium

27 September 2019	Chhattisgarh	1–3	Jharkhand	Kalyani, West Bengal
				Stadium: Kalyani Stadium

== North Zone ==
The North Zone matches of the Santosh Trophy will start on 22 September 2019 in Haldwani, Uttarakhand.

=== Group A ===
Pos	Team	Pld	W	D	L	GF	GA	GD	Pts	Qualification
1	Punjab	3	3	0	0	9	1	+8	9	Advance to Final Round
2	Jammu and Kashmir	3	2	0	1	7	4	+3	6	
3	Haryana	3	1	0	2	2	7	−5	3	
4	Uttarakhand (H)	3	0	0	3	0	6	−6	0	

Rules for classification: 1) points; 2) head-to-head points; 3) head-to-head goal difference; 4) goal difference; 5) number of goals scored; 6) drawing of lots
(H) Hosts

22 September 2019	Punjab	3–1	Jammu & Kashmir	Indira Gandhi International Sports Stadium, Haldwani, Uttarakhand
8:30

22 September 2019	Haryana	1–0	Uttarakhand	Indira Gandhi International Sports Stadium, Haldwani, Uttarakhand
15:00

24 September 2019	Haryana	1–4	Jammu & Kashmir	Indira Gandhi International Sports Stadium Haldwani, Uttarakhand
8:30	Bunty Singh 43'		Aakif Javed 5'; Adnan Ayoub 76'; Shakir 85', 88'

24 September 2019	Uttarakhand	0–3	Punjab	Indira Gandhi International Sports Stadium, Haldwani, Uttarakhand
15:00			Vikrant 15'; Amarpreet Singh 48'; Asif Khan 90+1'

26 September 2019	Punjab	3–0	Haryana	Indira Gandhi International Sports Stadium, Haldwani, Uttarakhand
8:30	Arif Khan 37'; Rajveer Singh; Suraj Gurung

26 September 2019	Uttarakhand	0–2	Jammu & Kashmir	Indira Gandhi International Sports Stadium, Haldwani, Uttarakhand
15:00			Shaaqir Shaikh 10'; 22'

=== Group B ===
Pos	Team	Pld	W	D	L	GF	GA	GD	Pts	Qualification
1	Delhi	3	3	0	0	12	1	+11	9	Advance to Final Round
2	Himachal Pradesh	3	2	0	1	6	9	−3	6	
3	Chandigarh	3	1	0	2	5	6	−1	3	
4	Uttar Pradesh	3	0	0	3	3	10	−7	0	

Rules for classification: 1) points; 2) head-to-head points; 3) head-to-head goal difference; 4) goal difference; 5) number of goals scored; 6) drawing of lots

23 September 2019	Delhi	4–1	Uttar Pradesh	Indira Gandhi International Sports Stadium, Haldwani, Uttarakhand
8:30	Shaktinath 1'; Mahip Adhikari 43'; Ayush Adhikari 50'; Mohit Singh 68'		Goal

23 September 2019	Chandigarh	2–3	Himachal Pradesh	Indira Gandhi International Sports Stadium, Haldwani, Uttarakhand
15:00

25 September 2019	Uttar Pradesh	0–3	Chandigarh	Indira Gandhi International Sports Stadium, Haldwani, Uttarakhand
8:30			Midhun Wilwet

25 September 2019	Delhi	5–0	Himachal Pradesh	Indira Gandhi International Sports Stadium, Haldwani, Uttarakhand
15:00	Aman Thapa 10'; Ayush Adhikari

27 September 2019	Chandigarh	0–3	Delhi	Indira Gandhi International Sports Stadium, Haldwani, Uttarakhand
8:30			Ayush Adhikari 13'; Aman Thapa 39'; Ripudaman 48'

27 September 2019	Himachal Pradesh	3–2	Uttar Pradesh	Indira Gandhi International Sports Stadium, Haldwani, Uttarakhand
15:00	Anand Pandey 57'; Atul Dev 60'; Sunny Chaudhary 89'		Mukesh Naithani; Gaurav Negi

== North-East Zone ==
The North-East Zone matches of the Santosh Trophy will start on 22 September 2019 in Agartala, Tripura.

=== Group A ===
Pos	Team	Pld	W	D	L	GF	GA	GD	Pts	Qualification
1	Mizoram	3	3	0	0	5	1	+4	9	Advance to Final Round
2	Tripura (H)	3	2	0	1	6	4	+2	6	
3	Arunachal Pradesh	3	0	1	2	3	7	−4	1	
4	Assam	3	0	1	2	4	6	−2	1	

Rules for classification: 1) points; 2) head-to-head points; 3) head-to-head goal difference; 4) goal difference; 5) number of goals scored; 6) drawing of lots
(H) Hosts

22 September 2019	Assam	1–2	Tripura	Umakanta Stadium, Agartala, Tripura
	Ujjal Brahma 50'		Goal

22 September 2019	Mizoram	1–0	Arunachal Pradesh	Umakanta Stadium, Agartala, Tripura
	Jessy Vanlalmuana 6'

24 September 2019	Mizoram	2–1	Tripura	Umakanta Stadium, Agartala, Tripura
	Vanlalnghenga 67'; Lalbiakhlua 74'		Faslu Rahman 64'

24 September 2019	Assam	2–2	Arunachal Pradesh	Umakanta Stadium, Agartala, Tripura
	Arjun Mardi; Mithinga Narzary

26 September 2019	Tripura	4–1	Arunachal Pradesh	Umakanta Stadium, Agartala, Tripura

26 September 2019	Mizoram	2–1	Assam	Umakanta Stadium, Agartala, Tripura
	David Lalchhuanawma 13'; Lalsawmzela 77'		Arjun Mardi 45'

=== Group B ===
Pos	Team	Pld	W	D	L	GF	GA	GD	Pts	Qualification
1	Meghalaya	2	2	0	0	7	1	+6	6	Advance to Final Round
2	Manipur	2	0	1	1	0	1	−1	1	
3	Nagaland	2	0	1	1	1	6	−5	1	

Updated to match(es) played on 27 September 2019. Source:
Rules for classification: 1) points; 2) head-to-head points; 3) head-to-head goal difference; 4) goal difference; 5) number of goals scored; 6) drawing of lots

23 September 2019	Nagaland	0–0	Manipur	Umakanta Stadium, Agartala, Tripura

25 September 2019	Nagaland	1–6	Meghalaya	Umakanta Stadium, Agartala, Tripura
	Ringham Jigdun		Allen Lyngdoh; Phrangki Buam; Ronaldkydon L Nonglait; Figo Syndai

27 September 2019	Meghalaya	1–0	Manipur	Umakanta Stadium, Agartala, Tripura
	Phrangki Buam

== West Zone ==
The West Zone matches of the Santosh Trophy will start on 23 September 2019 in Mapusa, Goa.

=== Group A ===
Pos	Team	Pld	W	D	L	GF	GA	GD	Pts	Qualification
1	Services	4	3	1	0	12	3	+9	10	Advance to Final Round
2	Maharashtra	4	3	1	0	8	2	+6	10	
3	Daman and Diu	4	1	0	3	3	6	−3	3	
4	Lakshadweep	4	1	0	3	5	9	−4	3	
5	Gujarat	4	1	0	3	5	13	−8	3	

Updated to match(es) played on 30 September 2019. Source:
Rules for classification: 1) points; 2) head-to-head points; 3) head-to-head goal difference; 4) goal difference; 5) number of goals scored; 6) drawing of lots

22 September 2019	Gujarat	1–7	Services	Duler Stadium, Mapusa, Goa
8:00	Shoaib Shaikh		Muhammad Inayath 17', 23'; Lallawmkima PC 27', 59'; Novin Gurung 45'; Sreyas VG 67', 79'

22 September 2019	Daman & Diu	0–1	Maharashtra	Duler Stadium, Mapusa, Goa
15:30			Advait Shinde 90+3'

24 September 2019	Lakshadweep	0–3	Maharashtra	Duler Stadium, Mapusa, Goa
8:00			Yash Mhatre 11'; Allan Dias 53'; Shanon Pereira 83'

24 September 2019	Gujarat	0–2	Daman & Diu	Duler Stadium, Mapusa, Goa
15:30			Sohail Khatri 24' (pen.); Brandon David 89'

26 September 2019	Daman & Diu	0–2	Services	Duler Stadium, Mapusa, Goa
8:00			Shreyas VG 72'; Pawan Gurav 73'

26 September 2019	Lakshadweep	1–3	Gujarat	Duler Stadium, Mapusa, Goa
15:30	Abdul Nazar 18'		Pavan Ramanun 29' (pen.); Ayaan Shaikh 39', 90+1'

28 September 2019	Gujarat	1–3	Maharashtra	Duler Stadium, Mapusa, Goa
8:00	Pavan Ramanuj 10'		Shanon Pereira 39' (pen.); Kamran Ansari 72', 82'

28 September 2019	Services	2–1	Lakshadweep	Duler Stadium, Mapusa, Goa
15:30	PC Lallawkima 33' (pen.); Sabir Khan 52'		Savad TI 44' (pen.)

30 September 2019	Services	1–1	Maharashtra	Duler Stadium, Mapusa, Goa
8:00	PC Lallawkima 69' (pen.)		Dion Menezes 10'

30 September 2019	Lakshadweep	3–1	Daman & Diu	Duler Stadium, Mapusa, Goa
15:30	Faizal Hussain; Abdul Nazar; Savad TI		Raj Bhoir

=== Group B ===
Pos	Team	Pld	W	D	L	GF	GA	GD	Pts	Qualification
1	Goa (H)	3	3	0	0	23	1	+22	9	Advance to Final Round
2	Rajasthan	3	2	0	1	6	3	+3	6	
3	Madhya Pradesh	3	1	0	2	6	9	−3	3	
4	Dadra and Nagar Haveli	3	0	0	3	0	22	−22	0	

Updated to match(es) played on 27 September 2021. Source:
Rules for classification: 1) points; 2) head-to-head points; 3) head-to-head goal difference; 4) goal difference; 5) number of goals scored; 6) drawing of lots
(H) Hosts

23 September 2019	Goa	2–0	Rajasthan	Duler Stadium, Mapusa, Goa
8:00	Joaquim Abranches 18', 32'

23 September 2019	Madhya Pradesh	4–0	Dadra and Nagar Haveli	Duler Stadium, Mapusa, Goa
15:30	Bikram Sarkar 31'; Deepak Ahirwar 33'; Melvin Shaji 90+1'; Akash Thapa 90+3'

25 September 2019	Rajasthan	4–0	Dadra and Nagar Haveli	Duler Stadium, Mapusa, Goa
8:00	Jayesh Kumar; Gajendra Meena; Trilok Singh; Sanjay Lamba

25 September 2019	Madhya Pradesh	1–7	Goa	Duler Stadium, Mapusa, Goa
15:30	Sahil Rajak		Lesly Rebello; Devendra Murgaonkar 21'; Standly Fernandes 41'; Samuel Costa 51'; Joaquim Abranches 55'; Aaren D'silva 80' (pen.), 86+5'

27 September 2019	Rajasthan	2–1	Madhya Pradesh	Duler Stadium, Mapusa, Goa
8:00	Sanjay Lamba; Shivam Bhaker		Bikram Sarkar 14'

27 September 2019	Goa	14–0	Dadra and Nagar Haveli	Duler Stadium, Mapusa, Goa
15:30	Ribhav Sardesai; Stendly Fernandes; Olvin Cardozo 49' (58); Denson Fernandes 51' (72), 87'; Aaren D'silva 70'; Sanson Pereira 81'

== South Zone ==
The South Zone matches of the Santosh Trophy started on 5 November 2019.

=== Group A ===
Pos	Team	Pld	W	D	L	GF	GA	GD	Pts	Qualification
1	Kerala (H)	2	2	0	0	11	0	+11	6	Advance to Final Round
2	Tamil Nadu	2	1	0	1	4	7	−3	3	
3	Andhra Pradesh	2	0	0	2	1	9	−8	0	

Rules for classification: 1) points; 2) head-to-head points; 3) head-to-head goal difference; 4) goal difference; 5) number of goals scored; 6) drawing of lots
(H) Hosts

5 November 2019	Kerala	5–0	Andhra Pradesh	EMS Stadium, Kozhikode
	Vibin Thomas 44'; Leon Augustine 45+2' (pen.); Emil Benny 53', 63'; N. Shihad 90+4'

7 November 2019	Tamil Nadu	4–1	Andhra Pradesh	EMS Stadium, Kozhikode
	A. Divakar 16'; L. Lijo 22', 72', 86'		Y. Tharun Kumar Reddy 79'

9 November 2019	Tamil Nadu	0–6	Kerala	EMS Stadium, Kozhikode
			Jithin M. S. 33', 45'; Vishnu PV 24'; Naizen Mousoof 83'; Jijo Joseph 90+2'; Emil Benny 90+4'

=== Group B ===
Pos	Team	Pld	W	D	L	GF	GA	GD	Pts	Qualification
1	Karnataka	2	2	0	0	13	1	+12	6	Advance to Final Round
2	Telangana	2	1	0	1	4	6	−2	3	
3	Pondicherry	2	0	0	2	0	10	−10	0	

Rules for classification: 1) points; 2) head-to-head points; 3) head-to-head goal difference; 4) goal difference; 5) number of goals scored; 6) drawing of lots

6 November 2019	Karnataka	7–0	Pondicherry	EMS Stadium, Kozhikode
	Dip Majumdar 20', 31'; Gunashekar Vignesh 26'; Sudheer Kotikela 32'; M. Nikhil Raj 48'; Amay Morajkar 74'; N. Solaimalai 78'

8 November 2019	Karnataka	6–1	Telangana	EMS Stadium, Kozhikode
	Dip Majumdar 11', 24'; Amay Morajkar 55' (pen.), 57'; M. Nikhil Raj 61', 87'		Yumnam Arnold Singh 65'

10 November 2019	Pondicherry	0–3	Telangana	EMS Stadium, Kozhikode
			M.T. Manu Prasad 7'; P. Sujai 39'; Mohammed Ahtesham Ali 81'
