= 2012–2013 Santosh Trophy Group Stage =

The group stage of the 2012–13 Santosh Trophy features 16 teams: the 4 automatic qualifiers and the 12 winners of the qualifiers.

The teams were drawn into four groups of four, and played each once in a round-robin format. The matchdays were from 21 February to 26 February.

The top team in each group advances to the Semi-Finals.

== Group A ==
Team	Pld	W	D	L	GF	GA	GD	Pts
Services	3	2	1	0	8	0	+8	7
Railways	3	2	1	0	7	1	+6	7
Orissa	3	1	0	2	4	6	−2	3
Madhya Pradesh	3	0	0	3	2	14	−12	0

23 February 2013

Services	0 – 0	Railways
	Report

Nehru Stadium, Kochi
23 February 2013

Orissa	3 – 2	Madhya Pradesh
Pandey 63'; Khan 80'; Shah 90'	Report	Phurba 70'; Manihar 84'

Nehru Stadium, Kochi

25 February 2013

Railways	2 – 1	Orissa
Shah 28'; Singh 85'	Report	Regin 74'

Nehru Stadium, Kochi
25 February 2013

Madhya Pradesh	0 – 6	Services
	Report	Farhad 25', 89', 90'; Sarkar 28'; Mawia 56', 86'

Nehru Stadium, Kochi

27 February 2013

Services	2 – 0	Orissa
Mawia 45'; Farhad 71'	Report

Nehru Stadium, Kochi
27 February 2013

Railways	5 – 0	Madhya Pradesh
Narzary 20'; Mustakin 50'; Riju 59'; A. Singh 71'; B. Singh 90'	Report

Nehru Stadium, Kochi

== Group B ==
Team	Pld	W	D	L	GF	GA	GD	Pts
Maharashtra	3	3	0	0	9	2	+7	9
Tamil Nadu	3	1	1	1	4	4	0	4
Goa	3	0	2	1	2	5	−3	2
Jharkhand	3	0	1	2	5	9	−4	1

22 February 2013

Tamil Nadu	0 – 0	Goa
	Report

Lal Bahadur Shastri Stadium, Kollam
22 February 2013

Maharashtra	4 – 1	Jharkhand
Rafi 30', 32', 46'; Lalrempunia 33'	Report	Murmu 5'

Lal Bahadur Shastri Stadium, Kollam

24 February 2013

Goa	0 – 3	Maharashtra
	Report	Rafi 54'; Pradeep 61'; Mendon 76'

Lal Bahadur Shastri Stadium, Kollam
24 February 2013

Jharkhand	2 – 3	Tamil Nadu
Mandi 28'; Sardar 89'	Report	Karthik 45'; Raegen 69'; Anandrai 85'

Lal Bahadur Shastri Stadium, Kollam

26 February 2013

Tamil Nadu	1 – 2	Maharashtra
Reagan 85'	Report	Pradeep 75', 88'

Lal Bahadur Shastri Stadium, Kollam
26 February 2013

Goa	2 – 2	Jharkhand
Colaco 68'; Rodrigues 81'	Report	Kujur 71'; Murmu 90+1'

Lal Bahadur Shastri Stadium, Kollam

== Group C ==
Team	Pld	W	D	L	GF	GA	GD	Pts
Kerala	3	2	1	0	6	3	+3	7
Haryana	3	1	1	1	5	4	+1	4
Uttar Pradesh	3	1	0	2	5	6	−1	3
Jammu & Kashmir	3	1	0	2	3	6	−3	3

22 February 2013

Haryana	1 – 2	Uttar Pradesh
Vikas 58'	Report	Verma 8', 73'

Nehru Stadium, Kochi
22 February 2013

Kerala	2 – 0	Jammu & Kashmir
Kannan 37', 63'	Report

Nehru Stadium, Kochi

24 February 2013

Jammu & Kashmir	1 – 3	Haryana
R. Kumar 33'		Vikas 30', 44'; V. Kumar 84'

Nehru Stadium, Kochi
24 February 2013

Uttar Pradesh	2 – 3	Kerala
Yadav 45'; Kaira 90'		Ashik 14'; Kannan 17'; Lal 26'

Nehru Stadium, Kochi

26 February 2013

Uttar Pradesh	1 – 2	Jammu & Kashmir
Feroz 5' (o.g.)	Report	Rashid 40'; Sheikh 57'

Nehru Stadium, Kochi
26 February 2013

Kerala	1 – 1	Haryana
Kannan 58'	Report	Sura 90'

Nehru Stadium, Kochi

== Group D ==
Team	Pld	W	D	L	GF	GA	GD	Pts
Punjab	3	3	0	0	9	3	+6	9
West Bengal	3	2	0	1	8	6	+2	6
Karnataka	3	1	0	2	3	4	−1	3
Manipur	3	0	0	3	3	10	−7	0

23 February 2013

Manipur	0 – 3	Punjab
	Report	Rohit 8'; Gagandeep 34'; Singh 74'

Lal Bahadur Shastri Stadium, Kollam
23 February 2013

West Bengal	1 – 0	Karnataka
Hela 34'	Report

Lal Bahadur Shastri Stadium, Kollam

25 February 2013

Punjab	4 – 3	West Bengal
S. Singh 14'; Kumar 21', 79'; A. Singh 45'	Report	Sana 69'; Biswas 76'; Hela 89'

Lal Bahadur Shastri Stadium, Kollam
25 February 2013

Karnataka	3 – 1	Manipur
Stephen 3'; Rajesh 10'; Amoes 82'	Report	Meino 63'

Lal Bahadur Shastri Stadium, Kollam

27 February 2013

Manipur	2 – 4	West Bengal
Meitei 80', 90+2'	Report	Sana 4'; Hela 17'; Dutta 57'; Biswas 90'

Lal Bahadur Shastri Stadium, Kollam
27 February 2013

Punjab	2 – 0	Karnataka
Kumar 11', 15'	Report

Lal Bahadur Shastri Stadium, Kollam
