= 1998–99 Santosh Trophy =

National Football Championship

Tournament details
- Country: India
- Dates: 25 March – 4 April 1999
- Teams: 12

Final positions
- Champions: Bengal (29th title)
- Runners-up: Goa

Tournament statistics
- Top goal scorer(s): Syed Sabir Pasha (9)

The 1998–99 Santosh Trophy was the 55th edition of the Santosh Trophy, the main State competition for football in India. It was held between 25 March and 4 April 1999 in Tamil Nadu, India. In the final, Bengal beat Goa 1–0 in a repeat of the previous edition's final. It was Bengal's sixth consecutive title and 29th overall.

== Group stage ==
=== Cluster I ===
Pos	Team	Pld	W	D	L	GF	GA	GD	Pts	Qualification
1	Bengal	2	2	0	0	6	1	+5	6	Advances to Semi-finals
2	Manipur	2	1	0	1	3	5	−2	3	
3	Services	2	0	0	2	1	4	−3	0	

Updated to match(es) played on unknown. Source: indianfootball.de
Rules for classification: 1) points; 2) goal difference; 3) goals scored; 4) head-to-head result.

27 March 1999	Services	1–2	Bengal	Udhagamandalam
	Rajesh Kumar Singh 40'	Report	Bhutia 17', 23' (pen.)

28 March 1999	Services	0–2	Manipur	Udhagamandalam
		Report	Wangchupler 4'; Manaoba Singh 34'

29 March 1999	Manipur	1–4	Bengal	Udhagamandalam
	Wangchupler 74'	Report	Bhutia 29'; Amit Das 48'; Biswas 85'; Ancheri 90'

=== Cluster II ===
Pos	Team	Pld	W	D	L	GF	GA	GD	Pts	Qualification
1	Goa	2	2	0	0	9	0	+9	6	Advances to Semi-finals
2	Karnataka	2	1	0	1	5	7	−2	3	
3	Chandigarh	2	0	0	2	1	8	−7	0	

Updated to match(es) played on unknown. Source: indianfootball.de
Rules for classification: 1) points; 2) goal difference; 3) goals scored; 4) head-to-head result.

26 March 1999	Chandigarh	1–5	Karnataka	Chennai
	Virender Kanwar 62'	Report	K. C. Ramesh 15', 44'; Vijay Kumar 33'; Murali ?' (pen.); George ?'	Stadium: Jawaharlal Nehru Stadium

28 March 1999	Chandigarh	0–3	Goa	Chennai
		Report	Seby Coelho 40'; Somatai Shaiza 57'; Marcus Carvalho 75'	Stadium: Jawaharlal Nehru Stadium

30 March 1999	Karnataka	0–6	Goa	Chennai
		Report	Somatai Shaiza 22'; Venkatesh 60'; Soares 65'; Marcus Carvalho 67'; Agostinho Rodrigues 88', 89'	Stadium: Jawaharlal Nehru Stadium

=== Cluster III ===
Pos	Team	Pld	W	D	L	GF	GA	GD	Pts	Qualification
1	Kerala	2	2	0	0	5	1	+4	6	Advances to Semi-finals
2	Maharashtra	2	0	1	1	2	3	−1	1	
3	Assam	2	0	1	1	1	4	−3	1	

Updated to match(es) played on unknown. Source: indianfootball.de
Rules for classification: 1) points; 2) goal difference; 3) goals scored; 4) head-to-head result.

26 March 1999	Maharashtra	1–1	Assam	Coimbatore

27 March 1999	Kerala	3–0	Assam	Coimbatore
	Saheer 1', 37'; Shaji 76'	Report

28 March 1999	Maharashtra	1–2	Kerala	Coimbatore
	Abbas Ali Rizvi 43'	Report	Sunny 14'; Boniface 68'

=== Cluster IV ===
Pos	Team	Pld	W	D	L	GF	GA	GD	Pts	Qualification
1	Tamil Nadu	2	2	0	0	5	1	+4	6	Advances to Semi-finals
2	Punjab	2	0	1	1	1	3	−2	1	
3	Delhi	2	0	1	1	0	2	−2	1	

Updated to match(es) played on unknown. Source: indianfootball.de
Rules for classification: 1) points; 2) goal difference; 3) goals scored; 4) head-to-head result.

25 March 1999	Tamil Nadu	3–1	Punjab	Chennai
	Jestes Antony 3'; Bobby 16'; Pasha 68'	Report	Manmohan Singh 23'	Stadium: Jawaharlal Nehru Stadium

27 March 1999	Punjab	0–0	Delhi	Chennai
		Report		Stadium: Jawaharlal Nehru Stadium

29 March 1999	Tamil Nadu	2–0	Delhi	Chennai
	Pasha 74'; Samson Selvakumar 74'	Report		Stadium: Jawaharlal Nehru Stadium

== Knockout stage ==
=== Semi-finals ===
1 April 1999

Tamil Nadu	1–3	Goa
Pasha 90'	Report	Venkatesh 13'; Francis Silveira 40'; Bruno Coutinho 87'

Jawaharlal Nehru Stadium, Chennai
2 April 1999

Bengal	3–1	Kerala
Bhutia 12'; Raman Vijayan 37'; Chapman ?'	Report	Saheer 26'

Jawaharlal Nehru Stadium, Chennai

=== Final ===
4 April 1999

Bengal	5–0	Goa
Basudeb Mondal 11'; Bhutia 48'; Chapman 53'; Raman Vijayan 68'; Biswas 82' (pen.)	Report

Jawaharlal Nehru Stadium, Chennai
