= 2008–09 Santosh Trophy =

2009 Santosh Trophy
63rd Senior National Football Championship

Tournament details
- Country: India
- Dates: 4–14 June 2009
- Teams: 31

Final positions
- Champions: Goa (5th title)
- Runners-up: West Bengal

The 2008–09 Santosh Trophy was the 63rd edition of Santosh Trophy, a football tournament in India. In the final, held in Chennai, Goa beat West Bengal by 4–2 on penalties after a 0–0 draw.

== Background ==
The tournament was held in Tamil Nadu for the tenth time; first time in 1955 and last in 1999. The latter edition saw West Bengal winning its 29th and last title before entering the 2008–09 tournament. Punjab entered the tournament on the back of two wins and were looking for a hat-trick of titles. The qualification round of the tournament was held in for venues: Chennai, Tiruvallur, Coimbatore and Tiruchirappalli.

== Knockout stage ==
=== Quarter-final Group A ===
Pos	Team	Pld	W	D	L	GF	GA	GD	Pts	Qualification
1	West Bengal	3	1	2	0	4	3	+1	5	Advance to Semi-finals
2	Tamil Nadu	3	1	1	1	4	3	+1	4	Advance to Semi-finals
3	Manipur	3	1	1	1	4	5	−1	4	
4	Punjab	3	1	0	2	3	4	−1	3	

Rules for classification: 1) points; 2) goal difference; 3) goals scored; 4) head-to-head result.
2 June 2009
16:00 IST

Manipur	2–1	Punjab
Sarabjeet Singh 30' (o.g.); Su. Singh 48'	Report	Balwant Singh 27'

Jawaharlal Nehru Stadium, Chennai
2 June 2009
18:30 IST

Tamil Nadu	1–1	West Bengal
P. C. Riju 40'	Report Archived 2022-04-30 at the Wayback Machine(subscription required)	Pachuau 93'

Jawaharlal Nehru Stadium, Chennai
4 June 2009
16:00 IST

Manipur	1–1	West Bengal
Pachuau 59'	Report	Su. Singh 59'

Jawaharlal Nehru Stadium, Chennai
4 June 2009
18:30 IST

Tamil Nadu	0–1	Punjab
	Report	J. Singh 78' (pen.)

Jawaharlal Nehru Stadium, Chennai
6 June 2009
16:00 IST

Tamil Nadu	3–1	Manipur
T. Muthu 28' (pen.), 34', 35'	Report	B. Singh 50'

Jawaharlal Nehru Stadium, Chennai
6 June 2009
18:30 IST

Punjab	1–2	West Bengal
P. Mahlima 55'	Report Archived 2022-04-30 at the Wayback Machine(subscription required)	Chakraborty 33'; Pachuau 84'

Jawaharlal Nehru Stadium, Chennai

=== Quarter-final Group B ===
Pos	Team	Pld	W	D	L	GF	GA	GD	Pts	Qualification
1	Goa	3	2	1	0	6	0	+6	7	Advance to Semi-finals
2	Services	3	2	0	1	2	1	+1	6	Advance to Semi-finals
3	Karnataka	3	1	1	1	2	1	+1	4	
4	Maharashtra	3	0	0	3	0	8	−8	0	

Rules for classification: 1) points; 2) goal difference; 3) goals scored; 4) head-to-head result.
3 June 2009
16:00 IST

Maharashtra	0–1	Services
	Report Archived 2022-04-30 at the Wayback Machine(subscription required)	K. Laldingliana 12' (pen.)

Jawaharlal Nehru Stadium, Chennai
Referee: T. Pradeep Kumar (Tamil Nadu)
3 June 2009
18:40 IST

Karnataka	0–0	Goa
	Report Archived 2022-04-30 at the Wayback Machine(subscription required)

Jawaharlal Nehru Stadium, Chennai
5 June 2009
16:00 IST

Karnataka	2–0	Maharashtra
Sanath Kumar 25'; Nabeel 67'	Report

Jawaharlal Nehru Stadium, Chennai
5 June 2009
18:30 IST

Goa	1–0	Services
Lawrence 57'	Report Archived 2022-04-30 at the Wayback Machine(subscription required)

Jawaharlal Nehru Stadium, Chennai
Referee: G. Sharma (Manipur)
7 June 2009
16:00 IST

Karnataka	0–1	Services
	Report Archived 2022-04-29 at the Wayback Machine(subscription required)	K. Laldingliana 28' (pen.)

Jawaharlal Nehru Stadium, Chennai
Referee: O. P. Thakur (Jharkhand)
7 June 2009
18:30 IST

Goa	5–0	Maharashtra
D'Mello 20', 30'; Masceranhas 35', 55', 90'	Report Archived 2022-04-30 at the Wayback Machine(subscription required)

Jawaharlal Nehru Stadium, Chennai

=== Semi-finals ===
10 June 2009
17:30 IST

Bengal	2–0	Services
Biswas 35', 65'	Report

Jawaharlal Nehru Stadium, Chennai
Referee: T. Pradeep Kumar (Tamil Nadu)

11 June 2009
17:30 IST

Tamil Nadu	0–1 (a.e.t.)	Goa
	Report Archived 2022-04-29 at the Wayback Machine(subscription required)	Lawrence 90+3' (pen.)

Jawaharlal Nehru Stadium, Chennai
Referee: Pratap Singh (SSCB)

=== Final ===
The match was a repeat of the final of the 1998–99 edition. Bengal made the final for the 40th time and Goa for their 12th time. It was the sixth meeting of the two teams in the final, with Bengal winning on five occasions and once the trophy shared. Goa entered the final having kept a clean sheet throughout the tournament.

14 June 2009
17:30 IST

Goa	0–0 (a.e.t.)	Bengal
	Report Archived 2022-04-29 at the Wayback Machine(subscription required)
Penalties
Lawrence (penalty scored); D'Mello (penalty scored); Rodrigues (penalty missed); Dias (penalty scored); Cardozo (penalty scored)	4–2	(penalty scored) Chakraborty; (penalty missed) Safar Sarkar; (penalty missed) Bhowmick; (penalty scored) Pachuau

Jawaharlal Nehru Stadium, Chennai
Referee: T. Pradeep Kumar (Tamil Nadu)
