= 2002–03 Santosh Trophy =

LG Santosh Trophy

Tournament details
- Country: India
- Dates: 17 October – 5 November 2002
- Teams: 12

Final positions
- Champions: Manipur (1st title)
- Runners-up: Kerala

Tournament statistics
- Matches played: 15
- Goals scored: 45 (3 per match)
- Top goal scorer: Bijen Singh (9 goals)

Awards
- Best player: James Lukram Singh (Manipur)
- Best goalkeeper: Noren Singh (Manipur)

The 2002–03 Santosh Trophy was the 58th Santosh Trophy. It was held from 17 October up to 5 November 2002 in Imphal, Manipur.

32 teams from all over India were supposed to participate in the national state championship but three states pulled out. The final was held between hosts Manipur and defending champions Kerala, which Manipur won through a golden goal by Indian international Tomba Singh.

== Qualifying rounds ==
Venues: Mapal Kangjeibung Stadium Main Stadium Kuman Lampak Eastern Sporting Union Ground Thangmeiband Athletic Union Ground

=== Cluster I ===
Pos	Team	Pld	W	D	L	GF	GA	GD	Pts
1	Bengal	2	2	0	0	12	0	+12	6
2	Jammu & Kashmir	2	1	0	1	4	5	−1	3
3	Rajasthan	2	0	0	2	0	11	−11	0

18-Oct-02: Jammu & Kashmir 4-0 Rajasthan [3,83 Deepak Sangral, 62 Rakhesh, 87 Manat Kumar]

20-Oct-02: Bengal 7-0 Rajasthan [14,40,73,80 Dipendu Biswas, 37 Sandip Das, 41,51 Amar Pyne]

22-Oct-02: Bengal 5-0 Jammu & Kashmir [3,24,67 Dipendu Biswas, 64 Surya Bikash Chakraborty, 83 Anupam Sarkar]

=== Cluster II ===
Pos	Team	Pld	W	D	L	GF	GA	GD	Pts
1	Maharashtra	2	2	0	0	5	2	+3	6
2	Meghalaya	2	1	0	1	4	4	0	3
3	Chandigarh	2	0	0	2	1	4	−3	0

18-Oct-02: Chandigarh 1-2 Meghalaya [C: 58 Munish Kumar; M: 17 Richard Nongneng, 43 Soki Lamara]

20-Oct-02: Maharashtra 2-0 Chandigarh [70 Naushad Moosa, 77 Aziz Quereshi]

22-Oct-02: Maharashtra 3-2 Meghalaya [Ma: 51 Aziz Quereshi, 71 Anthony Fernandes, 78 Altafuddin Ahmed; Me: 72 Sam Kharbhi, 77 Freddy Kharpran]

=== Cluster III ===
Pos	Team	Pld	W	D	L	GF	GA	GD	Pts
1	Punjab	2	2	0	0	1	0	+1	6
2	Mizoram	2	1	0	1	2	2	0	3
3	Madhya Pradesh	2	0	0	2	1	3	−2	0

18-Oct-02: Mizoram 2-1 Madhya Pradesh [Mi: 10 Joseph Lalnunzira, 48 Benjamin Zonunsiama; MP: 67 Rahamat Baig]

21-Oct-02: Punjab 1-0 Madhya Pradesh [33 Gurjit Singh Atwal]

23-Oct-02: Punjab 1-0 Mizoram [88 Sher Singh]

=== Cluster IV ===
Pos	Team	Pld	W	D	L	GF	GA	GD	Pts
1	Manipur	2	2	0	0	17	0	+17	6
2	Himachal Pradesh	2	1	0	1	1	8	−7	3
3	Pondicherry	2	0	0	2	0	10	−10	0

17-Oct-02: Manipur 8-0 Himachal Pradesh [36,51,70,83 Bijen Singh, 43 Kanta Singh, 55 Helen Singh, 62 Tomba Singh, 86 Tiken Singh]

20-Oct-02: Pondicherry 0-1 Himachal Pradesh [90 Rahul Sharma]

22-Oct-02: Manipur 9-0 Pondicherry [1 Sanaton Singh, 3,44,70,87 Tiken Singh, 40,41 Bijen Singh, 50 James Singh, 72 Nilakumar Singh]

=== Cluster V ===
Pos	Team	Pld	W	D	L	GF	GA	GD	Pts
1	Assam	2	2	0	0	6	0	+6	6
2	Bihar	2	1	0	1	1	3	−2	3
3	Andhra Pradesh	2	0	0	2	0	4	−4	0
3	Daman & Diu	0	0	0	0	0	0	0	0

Notes:
- Daman & Diu has pulled out

18-Oct-02: Assam 3-0 Andhra Pradesh [36 Utpal Basumatary, 44 Kamal Chetry, 90 Padum Brpha]

21-Oct-02: Bihar 1-0 Andhra Pradesh [58 Suresh Kalandi]

23-Oct-02: Bihar 0-3 Assam [6 Utpal Basumatary, 58 Saran Sonar, 79 Sanjiva Rongpi]

=== Cluster VI ===
Pos	Team	Pld	W	D	L	GF	GA	GD	Pts
1	Services	2	2	0	0	8	0	+8	6
2	Sikkim	2	1	0	1	3	3	0	3
3	Uttar Pradesh	2	0	0	2	0	8	−8	0
4	Arunachal Pradesh	0	0	0	0	0	0	0	0

Notes:
- Arunachal Pradesh has pulled out

19-Oct-02: Services 5-0 Uttar Pradesh [26,40,45 Pritam Bahadur, 49 Bikash Gurung, 60 Thiruna Vakarsu]

21-Oct-02: Sikkim 3-0 Uttar Pradesh [34 Milan Lepcha, 44 Kamal Bagdas, 89 Ram Rai]

23-Oct-02: Services 3-0 Sikkim [39 Jhoney P Gangmei, 56 Pritam Bahadur, 57 Raghu Kumar]

=== Cluster VII ===
Pos	Team	Pld	W	D	L	GF	GA	GD	Pts
1	Karnataka	3	3	0	0	12	1	+11	9
2	Tripura	3	2	0	1	7	6	+1	6
3	Gujarat	3	1	0	2	2	10	−8	3
3	Haryana	3	0	0	3	1	5	−4	0

19-Oct-02: Haryana 0-1 Gujarat [68 Mukesh Kumar]

19-Oct-02: Karnataka 4-1 Tripura [K: 11 SK Dayanand, 68 Jagadish Kumar, 76 Sunil S Kumar, 90 BV Pradeep; T: 21 Sambhu Saha]

21-Oct-02: Tripura 4-1 Gujarat [T: 10 Swapan Rai, 48 Sambhu Saha, 53,64 Premjit Singh Barua; G: 56 Ranjit Sisodiya]

21-Oct-02: Haryana 0-2 Karnataka [29 SK Dayanand, 75 Gregory Clarke]

23-Oct-02: Karnataka 6-0 Gujarat [34 Sunil S Kumar, 52,72 BV Pradeep, 62,79 SK Dayanand, 60 Kanika Raj]

23-Oct-02: Tripura 2-1 Haryana [T: 37,77 Swapan Rai; H: 30 Satya Singh]

=== Cluster VIII ===
Pos	Team	Pld	W	D	L	GF	GA	GD	Pts
1	Orissa	2	1	1	0	4	1	+3	4
2	Delhi	2	0	2	0	2	2	0	2
3	Nagaland	2	0	1	1	1	4	−3	1
4	Andaman Nicobar	0	0	0	0	0	0	0	0

Notes:
- Andaman Nicobar has pulled out

19-Oct-02: Orissa 0-0 Delhi

21-Oct-02: Nagaland 1-1 Delhi [N: 90 Vizo Peseyie; D: 45 Rajesh Arya]

23-Oct-02: Orissa 3-0 Nagaland [38,86 Gyanaranjan, 66 Bhabani Prasad Mohanty]

== Quarterfinal League ==
=== Group A ===
Pos	Team	Pld	W	D	L	GF	GA	GD	Pts	Qualification
1	Kerala	2	2	0	0	6	3	+3	6	Advance to Semi-finals
2	West Bengal	2	1	0	1	4	4	0	3	
3	Assam	2	0	0	2	2	5	−3	0	

Source: indianfootball.de
Rules for classification: 1) points; 2) goal difference; 3) goals scored; 4) head-to-head result.

25 October 2002	West Bengal	2–1	Assam	Imphal
12:00 IST	Biswas 6' (pen.); Amar Pyne 38'	Report	Sanjiva Rongpi 65'	Stadium: Khuman Lampak Main Stadium; Attendance: 6,000; Referee: S. Suresh (Tamil Nadu)

27 October 2002	Kerala	3–2	West Bengal	Imphal
12:00 IST	Sylvester Ignatius 31', 58'; T. Usman 87'	Report	Chandan Das 30'; Sandip Das 79'	Stadium: Khuman Lampak Main Stadium; Attendance: 6,000; Referee: Rizwah-ul-Haq (Delhi)

29 October 2002	Kerala	3–1	Assam	Imphal
12:00 IST	Dineesh K. 71'; Sylvester Ignatius 77'; Abdul Naushad 90'	Report	Sanjiba Rongpi 37'	Stadium: Khuman Lampak Main Stadium; Referee: S. M. Balu (Karnataka)

=== Group B ===
Pos	Team	Pld	W	D	L	GF	GA	GD	Pts	Qualification
1	Services	2	1	1	0	3	1	+2	4	Advance to Semi-finals
2	Maharashtra	2	1	1	0	2	1	+1	4	
3	Railways	2	0	0	2	0	3	−3	0	

Source: indianfootball.de
Rules for classification: 1) points; 2) goal difference; 3) goals scored; 4) head-to-head result.

25 October 2002	Maharashtra	1–1	Services	Imphal
14:00 IST	Ahmed 2'	Report	Pradeep Debnath 48'	Stadium: Khuman Lampak Main Stadium; Attendance: 6,000; Referee: S. M. Balu (Karnataka)

27 October 2002	Railways	0–1	Maharashtra	Imphal
14:00 IST		Report	Moosa 37'	Stadium: Khuman Lampak Main Stadium; Attendance: ≈6,000; Referee: Benjamin D'Silva (Goa)

29 October 2002	Railways	0–2	Services	Imphal
14:00 IST		Report	Pritam Bahadur 13', 58'	Stadium: Khuman Lampak Main Stadium; Attendance: 2,000; Referee: S. Suresh (Tamil Nadu)

=== Group C ===
Pos	Team	Pld	W	D	L	GF	GA	GD	Pts	Qualification
1	Goa	2	2	0	0	4	2	+2	6	Advance to Semi-finals
2	Karnataka	2	1	0	1	3	2	+1	3	
3	Punjab	2	0	0	2	1	4	−3	0	

Source: indianfootball.de
Rules for classification: 1) points; 2) goal difference; 3) goals scored; 4) head-to-head result.

26 October 2002	Punjab	0–2	Karnataka	Imphal
12:00 IST		Report	Mahendra Mani 22'; Sunil S. Kumar 30'	Stadium: Khuman Lampak Main Stadium; Attendance: 15,000; Referee: S. Sarkar (West Bengal)

28 October 2002	Goa	2–1	Punjab	Imphal
12:00 IST	Lawrence 42'; D'Cunha 44'	Report	Sher Singh 17'	Stadium: Khuman Lampak Main Stadium; Referee: A. Arjunan (Services)

30 October 2002	Goa	2–1	Karnataka	Imphal
12:00 IST	Jules Alberto 3'; Sukhdev Arwade 38'	Report	S. Paramesh 56'	Stadium: Khuman Lampak Main Stadium; Attendance: ≈23,000; Referee: Rizwan-ul-Haq (Delhi)

=== Group D ===
Pos	Team	Pld	W	D	L	GF	GA	GD	Pts	Qualification
1	Manipur	2	1	1	0	6	3	+3	4	Advance to Semi-finals
2	Tamil Nadu	2	1	1	0	4	3	+1	4	
3	Odisha	2	0	0	2	2	6	−4	0	

Source: indianfootball.de
Rules for classification: 1) points; 2) goal difference; 3) goals scored; 4) head-to-head result.

26 October 2002	Manipur	4–1	Odisha	Imphal
14:00 IST	Bijen Singh 9', 82'; Tiken Singh 38'; To. Singh 60'	Report	Premchand Singh 36'	Stadium: Khuman Lampak Main Stadium; Attendance: 27,000; Referee: Walter Pereira (Maharashtra)

26 October 2002	Tamil Nadu	2–1	Odisha	Imphal
14:00 IST	P. Muthu 24', 28'	Report	Saroj Kanta Pattnaik 19'	Stadium: Khuman Lampak Main Stadium; Attendance: 2,000; Referee: Kisan Avtar (Delhi)

26 October 2002	Manipur	2–2	Tamil Nadu	Imphal
14:00 IST	Uttam Singh 24'; Tiken Singh 69'	Report	Kulothungan 6'; A. Kumaravel 90+'	Stadium: Khuman Lampak Main Stadium; Attendance: 29,000; Referee: M. K. Roy (Assam)

== Semi-finals ==
1 November 2002
13:00 IST

Kerala	3–2	Services
Saheer 12', 22'; Ajayan 78'	Report	JF Gangmei 9'; Pritam Bahadur 69'

Khuman Lampak Main Stadium, Imphal
Attendance: ≈7,000
Referee: S. Suresh (Tamil Nadu)

3 November 2002
13:00 IST

Manipur	0–0 (a.e.t.)	Goa
	Report(subscription required)
Penalties
Ratan Singh (penalty scored); Re. Singh (penalty scored); Bijen Singh (penalty scored); Bungo Singh (penalty missed); JL Singh (penalty scored)	4–3	Jules Alberto (penalty missed); Lawrence (penalty scored); Menino Fernandes (penalty scored); B. Fernandes (penalty scored); Lawrence (penalty missed)

Khuman Lampak Main Stadium, Imphal
Attendance: ≈26,000
Referee: S. Suresh (Tamil Nadu)

== Final ==
5 November 2002
13:00 IST

Manipur	2–1 (a.e.t.)	Kerala
Tiken Singh 6'; To. Singh 94'	Report Archived 2022-04-22 at the Wayback Machine(subscription required)	Abdul Noushad 87'

Khuman Lampak Main Stadium, Imphal
Attendance: 25,000–29,000
Referee: S. M. Balu (Karnataka)

== Awards ==
Award	Recipient
Most Valuable Player of the Tournament	James Lukram Singh (Manipur)
Most Valuable Player of the Final	Tomba Singh (Manipur)
Best Goalkeeper	Noren Singh (Manipur)
Top goalscorer	Bijen Singh (9 goals)
