= 1985–86 Santosh Trophy =

National Football Championship

Tournament details
- Country: India
- Dates: 26 February 1986 - 18 March 1986
- Teams: 28

Final positions
- Champions: Punjab (5th title)
- Runners-up: Bengal

The 1985–86 Santosh Trophy was the 42nd edition of the Santosh Trophy, the main State competition for football in India. It was held in Jabalpur, Bilaspur and Bhilai in Madhya Pradesh. Punjab defeated Bengal in tie-breaker to retain the title.

28 teams took part. Ten teams were seeded to the quarter final league. The other 18 teams were divided into six clusters from which one team each qualified to the quarter final. Two clusters each were played in Jabalpur, Bilaspur and Bhilai. The sixteen teams were divided into four groups for the quarter final.

== Quarter-final ==
=== Group A ===
Pos	Team	Pld	W	D	L	GF	GA	GD	Pts	Qualification
1	Punjab	3	3	0	0	12	1	+11	6	Advance to Semi-finals
2	Karnataka	3	1	1	1	4	3	+1	3	
3	Gujarat	3	1	0	2	4	12	−8	2	
4	Madhya Pradesh	3	0	1	2	3	7	−4	1	

Source: RSSF, Sportsworld

Punjab	3–1	Madhya Pradesh

Punjab	8–1	Gujarat
Kashmira Singh

Punjab	1–0	Karnataka
Satish Kumar 75'

=== Group B ===
Pos	Team	Pld	W	D	L	GF	GA	GD	Pts	Qualification
1	Bengal	3	3	0	0	7	0	+7	6	Advance to Semi-finals
2	Tamil Nadu	3	2	0	1	5	3	+2	4	
3	Services	3	1	0	2	1	2	−1	2	
4	Meghalaya	3	0	0	3	1	9	−8	0	

Source: RSSF

Bengal	2–0	Tamil Nadu

Bengal	1–0	Services

Bengal	4–0	Meghalaya
Prasanta Banerjee

Tamil Nadu	1–0	Services

Tamil Nadu	4–1	Meghalaya

Services	1–0	Meghalaya

=== Group C ===
Pos	Team	Pld	W	D	L	GF	GA	GD	Pts
1	Maharashtra	3	2	1	0	6	1	+5	5
2	Goa	3	2	1	0	3	1	+2	5
3	Bihar	3	0	1	2	2	5	−3	1
4	Assam	3	0	1	2	2	6	−4	1

Source: RSSF

Goa	0–0	Maharashtra

Goa	4–2 replay	Maharashtra

After Maharashtra and Goa finished the group with 5 points, their match was replayed to decide the semifinalist. Goa won 4–2. Group C matches were played in Bhilai. Goa had to take an 11-hour bus ride to play Punjab in the semifinal at Jabalpur two days later.

=== Group D ===
Pos	Team	Pld	W	D	L	GF	GA	GD	Pts	Qualification
1	Kerala	3	2	0	1	6	1	+5	4	Advance to Semi-finals
2	Andhra Pradesh	3	1	1	1	2	2	0	3	
3	Sikkim	3	1	1	1	2	4	−2	3	
4	Railways	3	1	0	2	1	4	−3	2	

Source: RSSF

== Semifinals ==
Bengal	2–0	Kerala
Subir Sarkar

Punjab	1–0	Goa

Ravishankar Shukla Stadium, Wright Town, Jabalpur

== Final ==
18 March 1986

Punjab	0–0	Bengal
Penalties
	4–2

Ravishankar Shukla Stadium, Wright Town, Jabalpur

== Notes ==
The RSSSF pages used as reference give the tie-breaker score as 4-1 and 4–2 in two places.
