= 1983–84 Santosh Trophy =

National Football Championship

Tournament details
- Country: India
- Dates: ?? – 15 April 1984

Final positions
- Champions: Goa (2nd title)
- Runners-up: Punjab

Awards
- Best player: Arnold Rodrigues (Goa)

The 1983–84 Santosh Trophy was the 40th edition of the Santosh Trophy, the main State competition for football in India. It was held in April 1984 in Madras (now Chennai), Tamil Nadu. Goa beat Punjab 1–0 in the final to win the competition for their second time, and first as only-holders, after they held the trophy along with West Bengal in the previous edition. Arnold Rodrigues and Camilo Gonsalves (both Goa) were named the best forward and best player of the tournament respectively. The Goa side was captained by goalkeeper Brahmanand Sankhwalkar for second time.He ended the tournament with a clean sheet.

== Group A ==
Pos	Team	Pld	W	D	L	GF	GA	GD	Pts	Qualification
1	Goa	3	2	1	0	3	0	+3	5	Advance to Semi-finals
2	Punjab	3	1	2	0	4	1	+3	4	Advance to Semi-finals
3	Karnataka	3	0	2	1	2	3	−1	2	
4	Tamil Nadu	3	0	1	2	1	6	−5	1	

Source: Sportstar
Rules for classification: 1) points; 2) goal difference; 3) goals scored;

Goa	0–0	Punjab

Goa	1–0	Karnataka
Mauricio Afonso

Goa	2–0	Tamil Nadu
Ignatius Dias

Punjab	1–1	Karnataka
Darshan Singh Masih		R.D. Babu

Punjab	3–0	Tamil Nadu
Balwinder; Ravi Bhushan; Parminder Singh Sr

Karnataka	1–1	Tamil Nadu
Gomes		Hydross

== Group B ==
Pos	Team	Pld	W	D	L	GF	GA	GD	Pts	Qualification
1	Bengal	3	3	0	0	6	1	+5	6	Advance to Semi-finals
2	Kerala	3	1	1	1	6	7	−1	3	Advance to Semi-finals
3	Maharashtra	3	0	2	1	3	4	−1	2	
4	Andhra Pradesh	3	0	1	2	3	6	−3	1	

Source: Sportstar
Rules for classification: 1) points; 2) goal difference; 3) goals scored;

Bengal	1–0	Maharashtra
Krishnendu Roy

Bengal	3–1	Kerala
Manojit Das; Babu Mani		Ranjith

Bengal	2–0	Andhra Pradesh
Kartik Sett; Babu Mani

Kerala	3–2	Andhra Pradesh
Ranjith		Nasar Ali; Munawar Hussain

Kerala	2–2	Maharashtra
Ranjith; Tobias		Mohanavelu; Stephen Godinho

Maharashtra	1–1	Andhra Pradesh
Narinder Thapa		Sharfuddin

== Semi-finals ==
Team 1	Agg.	Team 2	1st leg	2nd leg
Goa	6–0	Kerala	1–0	5–0
Punjab	2–2 (4–2 p)	Bengal	2–2	0–0 (a.e.t.)

=== Matches ===
Goa	1–0	Kerala
Camilo Gonsalves 78'

Goa	5–0	Kerala
Dionosio Trinidade; Camilo Gonsalves; Jose Fernandez; Damodar Naik

Goa won 6–0 on aggregate.

Punjab	2–2	Bengal
Balwinder Singh; Darshan Singh Masih		Kartik Sett; Tarun Dey

Punjab	0–0 (a.e.t.)	Bengal
Penalties
	4–2	(penalty missed) Sudip Chatterjee; (penalty missed) Pem Dorji

2-2 on aggregate. Punjab won 4-2 on penalties. Surjit Singh, the goal keeper of Punjab, saved the second and third penalties.

== Final ==
15 April 1984

Goa	1–0	Punjab
Camilo Gonsalves 82'
