= 2019–20 Santosh Trophy =

Tournament details
- Country: India
- Dates: Cancelled
- Teams: 10

The 2019–20 Santosh Trophy would have been the 74th edition of the Santosh Trophy, the premier competition in India for teams representing their regional and state football associations. It was cancelled due to COVID-19 pandemic.

Services are the defending champions, having defeated Punjab in the final during the 2018–19 season.

== Qualifiers ==
The following teams have qualified:

- Delhi
- Goa
- Jharkhand
- Karnataka
- Kerala
- Meghalaya
- Mizoram
- Punjab
- Services
- West Bengal

== Group stage ==
=== Group A ===
Pos	Team	Pld	W	D	L	GF	GA	GD	Pts	Qualification
1	Services	0	0	0	0	0	0	0	0	Advance to Semi-finals
2	Kerala	0	0	0	0	0	0	0	0	Advance to Semi-finals
3	Delhi	0	0	0	0	0	0	0	0	
4	Meghalaya	0	0	0	0	0	0	0	0	
5	Jharkhand	0	0	0	0	0	0	0	0	

Updated to match(es) played on unknown. Source:
Rules for classification: 1) points; 2) head-to-head points; 3) head-to-head goal difference; 4) goal difference; 5) number of goals scored; 6) drawing of lots

10 January 2020	Delhi	v	Kerala	Aizawl

10 January 2020	Services	v	Jharkhand	Aizawl

12 January 2020	Meghalaya	v	Jharkhand	Aizawl

12 January 2020	Delhi	v	Services	Aizawl

14 January 2020	Services	v	Kerala	Aizawl

14 January 2020	Delhi	v	Meghalaya	Aizawl

16 January 2020	Delhi	v	Jharkhand	Aizawl

16 January 2020	Kerala	v	Meghalaya	Aizawl

18 January 2020	Meghalaya	v	Services	Aizawl

18 January 2020	Kerala	v	Jharkhand	Aizawl

=== Group B ===
Pos	Team	Pld	W	D	L	GF	GA	GD	Pts	Qualification
1	Punjab	0	0	0	0	0	0	0	0	Advance to Semi-finals
2	Goa	0	0	0	0	0	0	0	0	Advance to Semi-finals
3	Karnataka	0	0	0	0	0	0	0	0	
4	Mizoram	0	0	0	0	0	0	0	0	
5	West Bengal	0	0	0	0	0	0	0	0	

Updated to match(es) played on unknown. Source:
Rules for classification: 1) points; 2) head-to-head points; 3) head-to-head goal difference; 4) goal difference; 5) number of goals scored; 6) drawing of lots

11 January 2020	West Bengal	v	Goa	Aizawl

11 January 2020	Punjab	v	Karnataka	Aizawl

13 January 2020	Mizoram	v	Karnataka	Aizawl

13 January 2020	Punjab	v	West Bengal	Aizawl

15 January 2020	Punjab	v	Goa	Aizawl

15 January 2020	Mizoram	v	West Bengal	Aizawl

17 January 2020	West Bengal	v	Karnataka	Aizawl

17 January 2020	Mizoram	v	Goa	Aizawl

19 January 2020	Punjab	v	Mizoram	Aizawl

19 January 2020	Goa	v	Karnataka	Aizawl

== Knockout stage ==
Semi-finals
21 January 2020
Group A Winner
Group B Runner Up
21 January 2020
Group B Winner
Group A Runner Up

Final
23 January 2020
SF1 Winner
SF2 Winner

=== Semi-finals ===
TBA
TBA

Group A Winner	Game 11	Group B Runner Up

TBA
TBA

Group B Winner	Game 12	Group A Runner Up

=== Final ===
TBA
TBA

Game 11 Winner	Game 13	Game 12 Winner
