= 1968–69 Santosh Trophy =

Tournament details
- Country: India
- Dates: 23 February – 29 March 1969

Final positions
- Champions: Mysore (4th title)
- Runners-up: Bengal
- 90 minute matches

The 1968–69 Santosh Trophy was the 25th edition of the Santosh Trophy, the main State competition for football in India. It was held from 23 February to 29 March 1969 in Bangalore, Karnataka. The home team Mysore beat Bengal 1–0 in the final.

== Group stage ==
| 23 February 1969 | Delhi | 3–0 | Kerala | Sree Kanteerava Stadium, Bangalore |
| | Sri Prasad 10'; Bhandari (?), 82' | | | Referee: Moin-ud-din Hasan |

| 24 February 1969 | Jammu and Kashmir | 6–1 | Gujarat | Sree Kanteerava Stadium, Bangalore |
| | Farooq Ahmed 7' (?); Ghulam Rasool 14', 50' | | Peter Paul |

| 25 February 1969 | Services | 2–0 | Delhi | Sree Kanteerava Stadium, Bangalore |
| | Shyam Thapa 62'; Bir Bahadur 78' | | | Referee: C. R. Dasgupta (Bengal) |

| 26 February 1969 | Mysore | 3–0 | Jammu and Kashmir | Sree Kanteerava Stadium, Bangalore |
| | K. Abdul Azeez 25'; Doraiswamy Nataraj 44'; Nagendra | | | Referee: C. J. Vaz (Bombay) |

| 27 February 1969 | Uttar Pradesh | 2–1 | Haryana | Sree Kanteerava Stadium, Bangalore |
| | Somnath Chanda 55', 67' | | Ramesh Sharma 25' | Referee: C. R. Dasgupta (Bengal) |

| 28 February 1969 | Andhra Pradesh | 2–1 | Orissa | Sree Kanteerava Stadium, Bangalore |
| | Chakravarthy 3'; Jaffar 63' | | Ramakrishnan 70' | Referee: S. K. Bhattacharjee (Delhi) |

| 1 March 1969 | Maharashtra | 3–0 | Uttar Pradesh | Sree Kanteerava Stadium, Bangalore |
| | D'Souza 48'; Rawat 55', 60' |

| 2 March 1969 | Mysore | 1–1 | Services | Sree Kanteerava Stadium, Bangalore |
| | Muniyappa 28' | | Williams |

| 3 March 1969 | Rajasthan | 1–0 | Goa | Sree Kanteerava Stadium, Bangalore |
| | Chain Singh 47' |

| 4 March 1969 | Maharashtra | 3–1 | Andhra Pradesh | Sree Kanteerava Stadium, Bangalore |
| | D'Souza 3', 88'; Ranjit Thapa 18' | | Chakravarthy 17' |

| 6 March 1969 | Rajasthan | 6–1 | Services | Sree Kanteerava Stadium, Bangalore |
| | Magan Singh Rajvi 3', 8', 13', 28'; Sathyaprakash 53' | | Bose | Referee: Mohammed Azam (Andhra Pradesh) |

| 7 March 1969 | Madras | 6–1 | Assam | Sree Kanteerava Stadium, Bangalore |
| | Johnson 18', 67'; Palaniswamy 28', 55'; Victor 53' (?) | | Basanta Kabui 60' |

| 9 March 1969 | Mysore | 2–2 | Services | Sree Kanteerava Stadium, Bangalore |
| | Nagendra 15' (pen.) | | Bir Bahadur 19' |

| 11 March 1969 | Madhya Pradesh | 0–0 | Tripura | Sree Kanteerava Stadium, Bangalore |
| | | | | Referee: D. W. Dunn (Assam) |

| 12 March 1969 | Madhya Pradesh | 1–2 | Tripura | Sree Kanteerava Stadium, Bangalore |
| | Bimal Roy Chowdhury (?) | | Ranjit Thapa (?); Chinta Bahadur (?) | Referee: Varadachari (Madras) |

== Knockout stage ==
Madras entered the quarter-finals after its victory against Assam in the group stage. However, Bengal and Punjab made the quarter-finals after their wins over Tripura and Bihar respectively in the pre-quarter-finals.

=== Pre-quarter-finals ===
13 March 1969

| Bengal | 3–0 | Tripura |
|---|---|---|
| Pranab Ganguly 40'; Bhowmick 55', 73' | Report |

Sree Kanteerava Stadium, Bangalore
Referee: Moin-ud-din Hasan
15 March 1969

| Punjab | 4–0 | Bihar |
|---|---|---|
| Arjan Singh 11', 89', 90'; Joginder Singh 48' |

Sree Kanteerava Stadium, Bangalore

=== Quarter-finals ===
10 March 1969

| Madras | 4–1 | Rajasthan |
|---|---|---|
| Victor (?), 55' (?); Johnson (?) | | Bhagirath 76' |

Sree Kanteerava Stadium, Bangalore
Referee: S. K. Bhattacharjee (Delhi)
14 March 1969

| Mysore | 2–1 | Services |
|---|---|---|
| Prabhakar 73'; Muniyappa 85' | | Bir Bahadur 15' |

Sree Kanteerava Stadium, Bangalore
Referee: C. J. Vaz (Bombay)
17 March 1969

| Punjab | 1–1 | Bengal |
|---|---|---|
| Inder Singh (?) | | Parimal Dey (?) |

Sree Kanteerava Stadium, Bangalore

Replay

19 March 1969

| Punjab | 2–2 | Bengal |

Sree Kanteerava Stadium, Bangalore
Referee: Ikram-ul-Haq (Delhi)

Second replay

20 March 1969

| Punjab | 1–4 | Bengal |
|---|---|---|
| Inder Singh 35' | | Parimal Dey 10', 67'; Habib 17'; Pranab Ganguly 72' |

Sree Kanteerava Stadium, Bangalore

=== Semi-finals ===
The semi-finals were played in two legs; all games including the final were played at the Sree Kanteerava Stadium in Bangalore. The first semi-final was played between Mysore and Madras. After the two legs ended with the teams level at a 3–3 aggregate, a coin toss was held to decide the team that would progress to the Final. A confusion followed with both captains claiming to have won the toss, before the tournament committee of the Mysore State Football Association and officials of the All India Football Federation decided that another match be played to decide the victor. Madras withdrew protesting their decision for the replay which meant Mysore went through to the Final. The Madras Football Association stated that the "replay is against the rules of the championship and in spite of the fact that the Madras captain called correctly during the toss of the coin..." It further added, "It may be mentioned that the rules of the championship do not provide for a toss but only for a draw of lots." The second semi-final was played between Bengal and Maharashtra. Both legs ended in 1–1 draws, and Bengal proceeded to the Final after a lot was drawn in their favour.

==== First leg ====
16 March 1969

| Mysore | 2–3 | Madras |
|---|---|---|
| K. Abdul Azeez 77', 87' | | Victor 26', 70'; Johnson 72' |

Sree Kanteerava Stadium, Bangalore
Referee: C. J. Vaz (Bombay)
22 March 1969

| Bengal | 1–1 | Maharashtra |
|---|---|---|
| Dastidar 55' | | D'Souza 1' |

Sree Kanteerava Stadium, Bangalore

==== Second leg ====
23 March 1969

| Mysore | 1–0 | Madras |
|---|---|---|
| A. D. Nagendra 60' (pen.) |

Sree Kanteerava Stadium, Bangalore
24 March 1969

| Bengal | 1–1 (a.e.t.) | Maharashtra |
|---|---|---|
| Bhowmick | | D'Souza |

Sree Kanteerava Stadium, Bangalore
Referee: Ikram-ul-Haq (Delhi)

=== Final ===
The Final was contested by Mysore and Bengal on 26 March 1969. The match ended in a goalless draw and was replayed on 29 March. The replay which was announced to be played on 30 March was later brought back by a day. Mysore won the replay 1–0 with Doraiswamy Nataraj scoring for them in the 67th minute.

26 March 1969

| Mysore | 0–0 | Bengal |

Sree Kanteerava Stadium, Bangalore
Referee: C. J. Vaz (Bombay)

==== Replay ====
29 March 1969

| Mysore | 1–0 | Bengal |
|---|---|---|
| Doraiswamy Nataraj 67' |

Sree Kanteerava Stadium, Bangalore
Referee: Ikram-ul-Haq (Delhi)
