= 1996–97 Santosh Trophy =

National Football Championship

Tournament details
- Country: India
- Dates: 7–19 January 1997
- Teams: 8

Final positions
- Champions: Bengal (27th title)
- Runners-up: Goa

Tournament statistics
- Top goal scorer(s): Adrian Dias (4); Raman Vijayan (4)

Awards
- Best player: Raman Vijayan (Bengal)

The 1996–97 Santosh Trophy, also known as the Bharat Petroleum Santosh Trophy for sponsorship reasons, was the 53rd edition of the Santosh Trophy, the main State competition for football in India. It was held from 8 to 19 January 1997 in Jabalpur, Madhya Pradesh. In the final, Bengal beat Goa 1–0 in a repeat of the previous edition's final.

== Group stage ==
=== Group A ===
Pos	Team	Pld	W	D	L	GF	GA	GD	Pts	Qualification
1	Kerala	3	2	1	0	6	0	+6	7	Advance to Semi-finals
2	Bengal	3	2	0	1	7	3	+4	6	Advance to Semi-finals
3	Karnataka	3	1	0	2	3	8	−5	3	
4	Services	3	0	1	2	0	5	−5	1	

Updated to match(es) played on unknown. Source: indianfootball.de
Rules for classification: 1) points; 2) goal difference; 3) goals scored; 4) head-to-head result.

7 January 1997	Karnataka	1–0	Services	Jabalpur
	Karunakara Raju (pen.)	Report		Stadium: Ravishankar Shukla Stadium
Note: Leo Paul of Services injured his head going for a header. He lost consciousness and was carried out in a stretcher.

9 January 1997	Services	0–0	Kerala	Jabalpur
		Report		Stadium: Ravishankar Shukla Stadium

9 January 1997	Karnataka	2–3	Bengal	Jabalpur
	Ranjit 72'; Kadarivan 85'	Report	Vijayan ?', 40'; Basudeb Mondal ?'	Stadium: Ravishankar Shukla Stadium

11 January 1997	Services	0–4	Bengal	Jabalpur
		Report	Abdul Khalique 57', 68'; Biswas 84', 86'	Stadium: Ravishankar Shukla Stadium

11 January 1997	Karnataka	0–5	Kerala	Jabalpur
		Report	K. A. Anson 40'; V. P. Shaji ?', ?', 82'; Nizar ?'	Stadium: Ravishankar Shukla Stadium

13 January 1997	Kerala	1–0	Bengal	Jabalpur
	K. A. Anson 89'	Report		Stadium: Ravishankar Shukla Stadium

=== Group B ===
Pos	Team	Pld	W	D	L	GF	GA	GD	Pts	Qualification
1	Maharashtra	3	2	1	0	5	0	+5	7	Advance to Semi-finals
2	Goa	3	2	1	0	5	1	+4	7	Advance to Semi-finals
3	Punjab	3	1	0	2	1	4	−3	3	
4	Delhi	3	0	0	3	1	7	−6	0	

Updated to match(es) played on unknown. Source: indianfootball.de
Rules for classification: 1) points; 2) goal difference; 3) goals scored; 4) head-to-head result.

8 January 1997	Punjab	1–0	Delhi	Jabalpur
	Kuldip Singh 80'	Report		Stadium: Ravishankar Shukla Stadium

10 January 1997	Delhi	1–2	Goa	Jabalpur
		Report		Stadium: Ravishankar Shukla Stadium

10 January 1997	Maharashtra	1–0	Punjab	Jabalpur
	Augusto D'Silva 90'	Report		Stadium: Ravishankar Shukla Stadium

12 January 1997	Punjab	0–3	Goa	Jabalpur
				Stadium: Ravishankar Shukla Stadium

12 January 1997	Maharashtra	4–0	Delhi	Jabalpur
				Stadium: Ravishankar Shukla Stadium

14 January 1997	Maharashtra	Abandoned	Goa	Jabalpur
		Report		Stadium: Ravishankar Shukla Stadium; Referee: Mohammad Basheer

== Knockout stage ==
=== Semi-finals ===
16 January 1997

Goa	1–0	Kerala
Adrian Dias 20'	Report

Ravishankar Shukla Stadium, Jabalpur
17 January 1997

Bengal	1–0 (a.e.t.)	Maharashtra
Raman Vijayan 102' (pen.)	Report

Ravishankar Shukla Stadium, Jabalpur
Referee: Gulab Singh Chouhan (Gujarat)

=== Final ===
19 January 1997

Bengal	1–0 (a.e.t.)	Goa
Raman Vijayan 106'	Report

Ravishankar Shukla Stadium, Jabalpur
