= Carlton Chapman =

Indian footballer (1971–2020)

Personal information
- Full name: Carlton Anthony Chapman
- Date of birth: 13 April 1971
- Place of birth: Bangalore, Karnataka, India
- Date of death: 12 October 2020 (aged 49)
- Place of death: Bangalore, Karnataka, India
- Height: 1.65 m (5 ft 5 in)
- Position: Midfielder

Senior career*
Years	Team	Apps	(Gls)
–1991	Southern Blues		
1991–1993	Tata Football Academy		
1993–1995	East Bengal		(19)
1995–1997	JCT Mills		
1997–1998	Kochin		
1998–2001	East Bengal		(13)

International career
1991–2001	India		

Managerial career
- 2002–2008: Tata Football Academy
- 2008: Royal Rangers
- 2009–2013: Royal Wahingdoh
- 2013–2014: Bhawanipore FC
- 2014–2016: Students Union
- 2016–2017: Sudeva Moonlight FC
- 2017–2020: Quartz FC
Medal record
Men's football
Representing India
South Asian Games
Gold medal – first place	1995 Madras	Team competition
- * Club domestic league appearances and goals

Carlton Anthony Chapman (13 April 1971 – 12 October 2020) was an Indian professional footballer and head coach. As player, Chapman played as a midfielder for the India national team between 1995 and 2001 and also captained the side. At the club level, he had a successful career, having had two spells with East Bengal and one with JCT Mills.

As a coach, Chapman had a six-year spell with I-League 2nd Division club Tata Football Academy from 2002 to 2008, followed by Royal Wahingdoh FC and Students Union of the Bangalore Super Division. Between 2016 and 2017 he was the head coach of Sudeva Moonlight FC, a Delhi-based I-League 2nd Division football club and residential academy.

== Playing career ==
Chapman began his club career with Sai Centre, Bangalore, in the mid-1980s. He then played for Southern Blues, a Bangalore club, before joining the Tata Football Academy as a cadet in 1990. He stayed with the club until 1993 after graduating the previous year, before signing for East Bengal. He had a fruitful two years at East Bengal captaining the team in 1999–2000, until signed by JCT Mills in 1995. In 1993, his first season with Bengal, he scored a hat-trick against the Iraqi club Al-Zawra at the Asian Cup Winners' Cup, a match that Bengal won 6–2.

During his spell at JCT Mills, the team won 14 tournaments, with a team that had I. M. Vijayan and Baichung Bhutia, both of whom are regarded as India's all-time greats. After one season with FC Kochin in 1997–98, Chapman returned to his former club East Bengal in 1998. The team won the National Football League under his captaincy in 2001, before he announced his retirement from professional football.

In the Santosh Trophy, Chapman played for Karnataka, Punjab and West Bengal.

== Coaching career ==
=== 2002–2013 ===
Following his retirement as a player, Chapman coached the Tata Football Academy team, then in I-League 2nd Division, from 2002 to 2008. He was signed in December 2002 on a one-year contract as an assistant to head coach Ranjan Choudhary and assistant coach Vijay Kumar.

He quit in 2008, after the team was not allowed to play in the first division by its management even after having qualified. During these years, he had stints with the Indian under-19 team as an assistant coach and with the Jharkhand under-19 team in 2003 and 2005. Following his departure from Tata Football Academy, he had a stint with a New Delhi club, Royal Rangers, in 2008. He was then approached by Royal Wahingdoh, a club based in Shillong. He guided the team to three successive Shillong Premier League wins, and the Bordoloi Trophy win in 2011.

He also worked as an assistant coach in Royal Wahingdoh, when the club was managed by German coach Volker Hofferbert in 2012–13 season.

=== 2013–2017 ===
In 2013, Chapman was signed by Bhawanipore FC, a Kolkata-based club, that played in the I-League 2nd Division, after they failed to qualify for the first division by a point in the previous season. In 2014, he joined Students Union that competed in the Bangalore Super Division. In 2017, he joined Sudeva Moonlight, a club based in Delhi, as an assistant coach. Under him, the club got promoted to the I-League 2nd Division. In December 2017, Chapman was appointed the Technical Director of the Kozhikode-based Quartz International Football Academy.

== Death ==
Chapman died of a heart attack in Bangalore on 12 October 2020.

== Honours ==
India

- SAFF Championship: 1997, 1999; runner-up: 1995
- South Asian Games Gold medal: 1995

East Bengal

- IFA Shield: 2000

Bengal

- Santosh Trophy: 1998–99

== See also ==
- List of India national football team captains
