= 1989–90 Santosh Trophy =

National Football Championship

Tournament details
- Country: India

Final positions
- Champions: Goa (3rd title)
- Runners-up: Kerala

The 1989–90 Santosh Trophy was the 46th edition of the Santosh Trophy, the main State competition for football in India. It was held in Margao, Goa. Goa defeated Kerala 2–0 in the final to win the competition for the third time. Kerala finished second for the third straight year.

From this season, the tournament was limited to players who were under 23 years.

== Quarter-final ==
=== Pool A ===
Pos	Team	Pld	W	D	L	GF	GA	GD	Pts	Qualification
1	Bengal	3	3	0	0	5	0	+5	6	Advance to Semi-finals
2	Karnataka	3	2	0	1	8	2	+6	4	Advance to Semi-finals
3	Madhya Pradesh	3	0	1	2	1	5	−4	1	
4	Railways	3	0	1	2	2	9	−7	1	

Source: Indian Express
Rules for classification: 1) points; 2) goal difference; 3) goals scored;
14 May 1990

Madhya Pradesh	1–1	Railways
Pavitra Kar	Report	Jacob Verghese 53'

Margao
15 May 1990

Bengal	1–0	Karnataka
Murshid Ali 67'	Report

Margao
17 May 1990

Bengal	2–0	Railways
	Report

Margao
17 May 1990

Karnataka	2–0	Madhya Pradesh
Inderjit	Report

Margao
19 May 1990

Karnataka	6–1	Railways
Manoharan 43' 66'; Inderjit	Report	Bijay Paul (pen.) 22'

Margao
19 May 1990

Bengal	2–0	Madhya Pradesh
Subrata (pen.) 61'; Priyogopal	Report

Margao

=== Pool B ===
Pos	Team	Pld	W	D	L	GF	GA	GD	Pts	Qualification
1	Goa	4	2	1	1	6	2	+4	5	Advance to Semi-finals
2	Kerala	4	2	1	1	10	7	+3	5	Advance to Semi-finals
3	Bihar	4	2	1	1	3	6	−3	5	
4	Maharashtra	4	1	1	2	3	6	−3	3	
5	Punjab	4	1	0	3	4	4	0	2	

Source: Indian Express
Rules for classification: 1) points; 2) goal difference; 3) goals scored;
12 May 1990

Kerala	6–1	Bihar
Liston; Santosh; I. M. Vijayan; Al Akbar; Romeo	Report	Kedar Thapa 64'

Margao
13 May 1990

Maharashtra	2–0	Punjab
Shiv Kumar 38'; Abdul Khalique	Report

Margao
16 May 1990

Goa	0–0	Bihar
	Report

Margao
16 May 1990

Punjab	4–1	Kerala
Satjinder 10'; Sandeep Saini	Report	Santosh 3'

Margao
18 May 1990

Kerala	1–1	Maharashtra
Harshan	Report	Godfrey 18'

Margao
18 May 1990

Goa	1–0	Punjab
Bruno Coutinho	Report

Margao
20 May 1990

Kerala	2–1	Goa
I. M. Vijayan 13', 22'	Report	Roy Baretto 58'

Margao
20 May 1990

Bihar	1–0	Maharashtra
Pradhan	Report

Margao
22 May 1990

Goa	4–0	Maharashtra
Roy Baretto 72'; Santan Colaco 78'	Report

Margao
22 May 1990

Bihar	1–0	Punjab
Rafique	Report

Margao

== Semifinals ==
24 May 1990

Kerala	1–0	Bengal
Harshan 59'	Report

Fatorda Stadium, Margao
25 May 1990

Goa	3–1	Karnataka
	Report

Fatorda Stadium, Margao

== Final ==
27 May 1990

Goa	2–0	Kerala
Bruno Coutinho 23'; Thomas Khushboo 52' (pen.)	Report

Fatorda Stadium, Margao
