= 1993–94 Santosh Trophy =

National Football Championship

Tournament details
- Country: India

Final positions
- Champions: Bengal (24th title)
- Runners-up: Kerala

The 1993–94 Santosh Trophy was the 50th edition of the Santosh Trophy, the main State competition for football in India. It was held in Orissa with the final in Cuttack.

Bengal defeated Kerala 5–3 penalties in the final. It was the 24th title for Bengal. For Kerala who were the defending champions, it was their seventh consecutive final.

For sponsorship reasons, the tournament was titled Bharat Petroleum Golden Jubilee National Football Championship for the Santosh Trophy. Bharat Petroleum sponsored Santosh Trophy for six seasons till 1999.

== Semifinal ==
24 February 1994

Bengal	2–1 (a.e.t.)	Punjab
Sanjay Majhi 15'; Sisir Ghosh 99'	Report	Harjinder Singh 1'

Barabati Stadium, Cuttack
25 February 1994

Kerala	5–1	Orissa
Suresh Kumar 44'; Jo Paul Ancheri 51' 87'; V.P. Shaji 70'; Ajit Kumar 78'	Report	Saroj Das 43'

Barabati Stadium, Cuttack

== Final ==
27 February 1994

Bengal	2–2 (a.e.t.)	Kerala
I. M. Vijayan 12'; Sanjay Majhi 21'	Report	Pappachan 28'; Jo Paul Ancheri 67'
Penalties
Aloke Das (penalty scored); Sisir Ghosh (penalty scored); Carlton Chapman (penalty scored); Saravanan (penalty scored); Subir Ghosh (penalty scored)	5–3	(penalty scored) Pappachan; (penalty scored) Jo Paul Ancheri; (penalty scored) Sajid; (penalty missed) Hameed

Barabati Stadium, Cuttack
