= Sanjeeva Uchil =

Indian footballer

Personal information
- Place of birth: Uchil, Mangalore
- Date of death: 24 February 2006
- Place of death: Mumbai, Maharashtra, India

Senior career*
| Years | Team | Apps | (Gls) |
- Trades India
- Bombay

International career
- India
- * Club domestic league appearances and goals

Sanjeeva Uchil (died 24 February 2006) was an Indian football goalkeeper who represented India at the 1948 Summer Olympics in London.

His origins are from the southern Indian city of Mangalore in Karnataka state.

== Honours ==
India

- Asian Quadrangular Football Tournament: 1953, 1954, 1955

Bombay

- Santosh Trophy: 1954–55
