= 2011–12 Santosh Trophy =

2012 Santosh Trophy
Tournament details
- Country: India
- Teams: 16

Final positions
- Champions: Services (2nd title)
- Runners-up: Tamil Nadu

The 66th Santosh Trophy 2012 was held in Odisha from 11 May 2012 to 28 May 2012.

== Calendar ==
The calendar for the 2012 Santosh Trophy, as announced by the All India Football Federation:

Round	Main date
Qualification	11 May 2012 to 16 May 2012
Quarter Finals	18 May 2012 to 23 May 2012
Semi-Finals	25 May 2012 to 26 May 2012
Final	28 May 2012

== Qualifying rounds ==
=== Cluster I ===
Team	Pld	W	D	L	GF	GA	GD	Pts
Delhi	3	3	0	0	20	1	+19	9
Gujarat	3	2	0	1	14	6	+8	6
Jharkhand	3	1	0	2	11	5	+6	3
Andaman & Nicobar	3	0	0	3	1	34	−33	0

=== Cluster II ===
Team	Pld	W	D	L	GF	GA	GD	Pts
Kerala	2	2	0	0	8	0	+8	6
Himachal Pradesh	2	1	0	1	3	6	−3	3
Tripura	2	0	0	2	2	7	−5	0

=== Cluster III ===
Team	Pld	W	D	L	GF	GA	GD	Pts
Meghalaya	3	3	0	0	10	1	+9	9
Chandigarh	3	2	0	1	5	7	−2	6
Jharkhand	3	1	0	2	2	3	−1	3
Puducherry	3	0	0	3	1	7	−6	0

=== Cluster VII ===
Team	Pld	W	D	L	GF	GA	GD	Pts
Haryana	3	3	0	0	10	2	+8	9
Assam	3	2	0	1	11	4	+7	6
Sikkim	3	1	0	2	7	10	−3	3
Daman & Diu	3	0	0	3	2	14	−12	0

== Quarter-finals ==
=== Group A ===
Team	Pld	W	D	L	GF	GA	GD	Pts
Kerala	3	2	1	0	5	2	+3	7
Maharashtra	3	2	0	1	8	4	+4	6
West Bengal	3	1	1	1	3	3	0	4
Punjab	3	0	0	3	2	9	−7	0

18 May 2012	West Bengal	1 – 2	Maharashtra
	Tarif Ahmed 71'	Report	Kailash Patel 20'; Linekar Machando 70'

18 May 2012	Punjab	1 – 2	Kerala
	Rohit Kumar 38'	Report	Sajith T 73'; Shibinlal 90'

20 May 2012	Maharashtra	5 – 0	Punjab
	Vijith Shetty 7'; Kailash Patil 29', 71', 83'; Reuben D'Souza 88'	Report

20 May 2012	Kerala	0 – 0	West Bengal
		Report

22 May 2012	Maharashtra	1 – 3	Kerala
	Kailash Patil 8'	Report	Surjith V.V. 10'; R. Kannan 72', 81'

22 May 2012	West Bengal	2 – 1	Punjab
	Mohammed Mukhtar 17'; Tapan Maity 87'	Report	Gurmeet Singh 16'

=== Group B ===
Team	Pld	W	D	L	GF	GA	GD	Pts
Manipur	3	2	1	0	9	2	+7	7
Goa	3	2	1	0	6	3	+3	7
Meghalaya	3	1	0	2	4	3	+1	3
Uttar Pradesh	3	0	0	3	0	11	−11	0

18 May 2012	Manipur	1 – 0	Meghalaya
	Chaothoiba Singh 62'	Report

18 May 2012	Goa	2 – 0	Uttar Pradesh
	Gabriel Fernandes 54'; Agnelo Colaco 61'	Report

20 May 2012	Meghalaya	1 – 2	Goa
	Bansharai Sun 70'	Report	Sachin Gawas 57'; Gabriel Fernandes 87'

20 May 2012	Uttar Pradesh	0 – 6	Manipur
		Report	Chaothoiba Singh 32', 53', 65', 68'; Thoi Singh 78'; Naoton Singh 90'

22 May 2012	Meghalaya	3 – 0	Uttar Pradesh
	Ronnie Nongbri 7'; Bansharai Sun 18'; Timmy Ryngkhlem 82'	Report

22 May 2012	Manipur	2 – 2	Goa
	Thoi Singh 19'; Govin Singh 70'	Report	Gabriel Fernandes 26'; Prathesh Shirodkar 45'

=== Group C ===
Team	Pld	W	D	L	GF	GA	GD	Pts
Services	3	2	1	0	11	1	+10	7
Odisha	3	1	2	0	6	2	+4	5
Haryana	3	1	1	1	7	6	+1	4
Chhattisgarh	3	0	0	3	1	16	−15	0

19 May 2012	Services	4 – 0	Haryana
	Z. Horin 8'; Subrata Sarkar 67'; Farhad V.V. 74', 85'	Report

19 May 2012	Odisha	4 – 0	Chhattisgarh
	Gokul Oram 45', 82', 90'; Antu Murmu 66'	Report

21 May 2012	Haryana	1 – 1	Odisha
	Abhisek 8'	Report	Antu Murmu 44'

21 May 2012	Chhattisgarh	0 – 6	Services
		Report	Farhad V.V. 4', 33', 75'; Z. Horin 44'; Thyagarajan 62', 90'

23 May 2012	Haryana	6 – 1	Chhattisgarh
	Abhisek 5', 67', 83'; Habib Khan 37'; Ajay 45'; Devender 53'	Report	K. Praveen 54'

23 May 2012	Odisha	1 – 1	Services
	Gokul Oram 33'	Report	Gordon Zoramchhana 55'

=== Group D ===
Team	Pld	W	D	L	GF	GA	GD	Pts
Tamil Nadu	3	2	1	0	5	3	+2	7
Railways	3	1	2	0	4	3	+1	5
Delhi	3	1	0	2	4	3	+1	3
Mizoram	3	0	1	2	5	9	−4	1

19 May 2012	Railways	2 – 2	Mizoram
	Gurpreet Singh 15'; Rizu 45'	Report	V. Lalanpuia 40'; F. Lalrinpuia 50'

19 May 2012	Tamil Nadu	1 – 0	Delhi
	S. Karthik 76'	Report

21 May 2012	Mizoram	3 – 4	Tamil Nadu
	F. Lalrinpuia 2', 22'; Lalbiakhlua 88'	Report	Charles Anandraj 38'; U. Jayakumar 49', 78'; M. Ramesh 90'

21 May 2012	Delhi	1 – 2	Railways
	Vikash Rawat 84'	Report	Lalmohan Hansda 82'; Gurpreet Singh 86'

23 May 2012	Mizoram	0 – 3	Delhi
		Report	Mahendra Singh 53'; Dhiraj Singh 78'; Kamson Kabui 87'

23 May 2012	Railways	0 – 0	Tamil Nadu
		Report

== Semi-finals ==
25 May 2012	Kerala	1 – 2	Services	Barabati Stadium, Odisha
	Vineet Anthony 83'; Marsook (Own Goal) 50'	Report	Subrata Sarkar 5'

25 May 2012	Manipur	0 – 2	Tamil Nadu	Barabati Stadium, Odisha
		Report	A Reagan 35'; M David 85'

== Final ==
28 May 2012
18:00 IST

Services	3 – 2	Tamil Nadu
Sanju Subba 45'; Subrata Sarkar 49'; VV Farhad 67'	Report	Santa Kumar 82'; M Ramesh 89'

Barabati Stadium, Odisha

Services
Tamil Nadu
