= 1955–56 Santosh Trophy =

Tournament details
- Country: India
- Dates: January 17, 1956

Final positions
- Champions: Bengal (8th title)
- Runners-up: Mysore
- 70 minute matches

The 1955–56 Santosh Trophy was the 12th edition of the Santosh Trophy, the main State competition for football in India. It was held in 1956 in Ernakulam, Kerala. Bengal beat Mysore 1–0 in the final.

== Final ==
17 January 1956

| Bengal | 1–0 | Mysore |
|---|---|---|
| P. K. Banerjee 45' | Report |

Ernakulam
Referee: Jayaram
