= 1953–54 Santosh Trophy =

National Football Championship

Tournament details
- Country: India

Final positions
- Champions: Bengal (7th title)
- Runner-up: Mysore
- 60 minute matches

The 1953–54 Santosh Trophy was the tenth edition of the Santosh Trophy, the main territorial competition in India. It was held in Calcutta, West Bengal. Managed by Balaidas Chatterjee, Bengal won their seventh title by defeating Mysore 3–1 in the final.

Bengal won their quarter-final match against Bihar, semifinal match against Bombay and the final against Mysore in replayed games.

== Quarter final ==
18 August 1953

Hyderabad	1–0	Assam
Moin 68'	Report

Calcutta
Referee: P. Chakravarty

19 August 1953

Mysore	3–0	Delhi
Nari 16'; Balasubramaniam 58'; Ramaiah 68'	Report

Calcutta
Referee: P. Chakravarty

25 August 1953

Bombay	1–0	Services
Santiago 41'	Report

Calcutta
Referee: P. Chakravarty

25 August 1953

Bengal	0–0	Bihar
	Report

Calcutta
27 August 1953

Bengal	1–1 replay	Bihar
Mewalal	Report	P. K. Banerjee

Calcutta
Referee: H. Fischer
28 August 1953

Bengal	2–1 replay	Bihar
Dutt; Manna 44'	Report	S. Ghosh

Calcutta
Referee: H. Fischer

P. K. Banerjee made his debut in Santosh Trophy, playing for Bihar.

== Semifinal ==
23 August 1953

Mysore	1–0	Hyderabad
A Ramaiah 4'	Report

Calcutta
Referee: Aloke Roy

30 August 1953

Bengal	0–0	Bombay
	Report

Calcutta
Referee: P. Chakravarty
31 August 1953

Bengal	1–0 replay	Bombay
Narayan	Report

Calcutta
Referee: P. Chakravarty

== Third place match ==
1 September 1953

Hyderabad	4–0	Bombay
Moin; Doraiswamy	Report

Calcutta

== Final ==
2 September 1953

Bengal	0–0	Mysore
	Report

Calcutta
Referee: Alok Roy

== Final replay ==
4 September 1953

Bengal	3–1 (a.e.t.)	Mysore
S. Dutt 59'; Robi Das; Mewalal	Report	Pushparaj 14'

Mohun Bagan Ground, Calcutta
