= M. Dutta Ray Trophy =

Indian football tournament

M. Dutta Ray Trophy U-21 National Football Championship
- Founded: 1992; 34 years ago
- Abolished: 2010
- Region: India
- Teams: 36
- Related competitions: B.C. Roy Trophy
- Most championships: West Bengal (6 titles)

The U-21 National Football Championship, also known as M. Dutta Ray Trophy, was an Indian football tournament held for players under 21 years of age. This trophy was named after Manindra Nath Dutta Ray, former president of the AIFF. This was introduced when Olympic football became a U-23 event in 1992 Summer Olympics at Barcelona in Spain. The 19th and last edition was held in Gurgaon and Faridabad in Haryana state from 15 to 28 February 2010. The Goa football team won the 2010 tournament by beating Haryana football team 1–0 in the final.

== Results ==
The following is the list of winners and runners-up:

Season	Host	Winner	Score	Runner-up
1992	Chinsurah	Bengal	1–0	Karnataka
1993	Margao	Goa	2–0	Bengal
1994	Imphal	Manipur	1–0	Assam
1995	Thrissur	Kerala	0–0 (3–1 p)	Bengal
1996	Suri	Bengal	3–1	Maharashtra
1997	Midnapore	Railways	1–0	Bengal
1998	Nimbahera	Railways	1–0	Bengal
1999	Dumka	Goa	1–0	Bengal
2000	Duliajan	West Bengal	3–1	Goa
2001	Mandya	Goa	1–1 (draw of lots)	West Bengal
2002	Ballia	Bengal	2–1	Services
2003	Jamalpur	Punjab	4–1	West Bengal
2004	Tiruchirappalli	West Bengal	1–1 (4–3 p)	Tamil Nadu
2005	Jamalpur	West Bengal	1–0	Punjab
2006	Guwahati	Goa	2–1	Punjab
2007	Madurai	Goa	2–0	Tamil Nadu
2008	Margao	Punjab	3–2	Mizoram
2010	Faridabad	Goa	1–0	Haryana
