= 1954–55 Santosh Trophy =

Tournament details
- Country: India
- Dates: August 14, 1954

Final positions
- Champions: Bombay (1st title)
- Runners-up: Services
- 70 minute matches

The 1954–55 Santosh Trophy was the 11th edition of the Santosh Trophy, the main State competition for football in India. It was held in 1954 in Madras, Tamil Nadu. Bombay won their first title beating Services 2–1 in the final.

== Final ==
14 August 1954

Bombay	2–1	Services
Gulab Singh 16'; Neville D'Souza 55'	Report	Mukherjee 39' (pen.)

Madras
Attendance: 20,000

== Squads ==
- Bombay : Sanjiva; Soman and Papen; Narayan, Sanil and Shanker; Gowder, Neville D'Souza, Gulab Singh, Braganza and Kuppuswamy
- Services : Dorairaj; Watson and Paul; Pearl, Bir Bahadur and Bhagwan Singh; Mukherjee, Mech, Lyngdoh, Puran Bahadur and Jayaram
