= Mario Soares (footballer) =

Indian footballer and coach

Personal information
- Date of birth: 16 August 1967 (age 59)
- Place of birth: Goa, India
- Position: Midfielder

Team information
- Current team: Churchill Brothers

Youth career
- Salcette

Senior career*
Years	Team	Apps	(Gls)
- Salgaocar
- Dempo
- Churchill Brothers

International career
1991	India U23	3	(1)
- India

Managerial career
- 2016: Salgaocar (caretaker)
- 2019–: Churchill Brothers (assistant coach)
- * Club domestic league appearances and goals

Mario Soares (born 16 August 1967) is an Indian football manager and a former player who is an assistant coach of Indian I-League side Churchill Brothers. During his playing days, Soares played for Salgaocar, Dempo, Churchill Brothers, and represented India internationally.

== Playing career ==
Born in Goa, Soares started his football career as a youth player with Salcette. He started his senior career with Salgaocar, where he won the Federation Cup with the club in 1988. He scored the winning goal in extra-time against Border Security Force, securing a 1-0 victory for Salgaocar. He then went on to play for Dempo and Churchill Brothers later in his career. Soares also represented Goa in the Santosh Trophy and captained the state.

== International ==
Soares represented India at the under-23 level during the 1992 Summer Olympics qualifiers. He scored the only goal for India in their draw to Oman U23. He also represented India internationally at senior level.

== Coaching career ==
=== Salgaocar ===
After the departure of Santosh Kashyap from Salgaocar, Soares was put in caretaker charge of the I-League club.
