= Gouranga Biswas =

Indian footballer (born 1987)

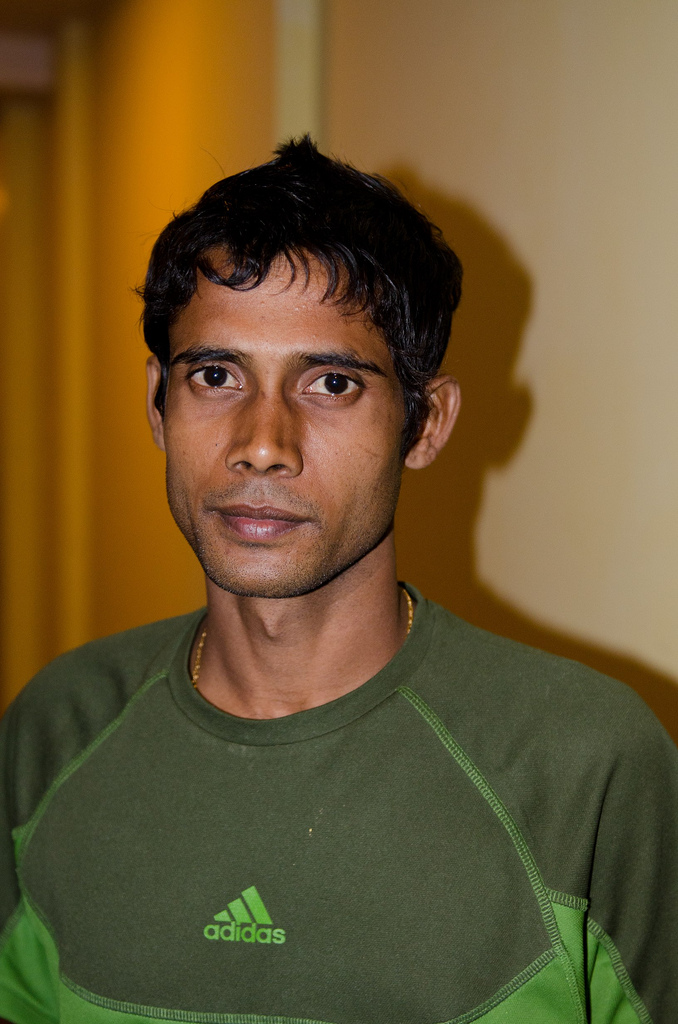

Personal information
- Full name: Gouranga Biswas
- Date of birth: 17 December 1987 (age 38)
- Place of birth: Kolkata, India
- Height: 1.72 m (5 ft 7 1/2 in)
- Position: Midfielder

Team information
- Current team: Eagles F.C. (on loan)

Senior career*
Years	Team	Apps	(Gls)
2006–2008	East Bengal		
2008–2009	Air India		
2009–2013	Prayag United		
2013– (on loan)	Eagles		
- * Club domestic league appearances and goals

Gouranga Biswas (born 17 December 1987 in Kolkata) is an Indian footballer who is currently playing for Eagles F.C. on loan from IMG RELIANCE as a midfielder.
