= Asif Saheer =

Indian footballer

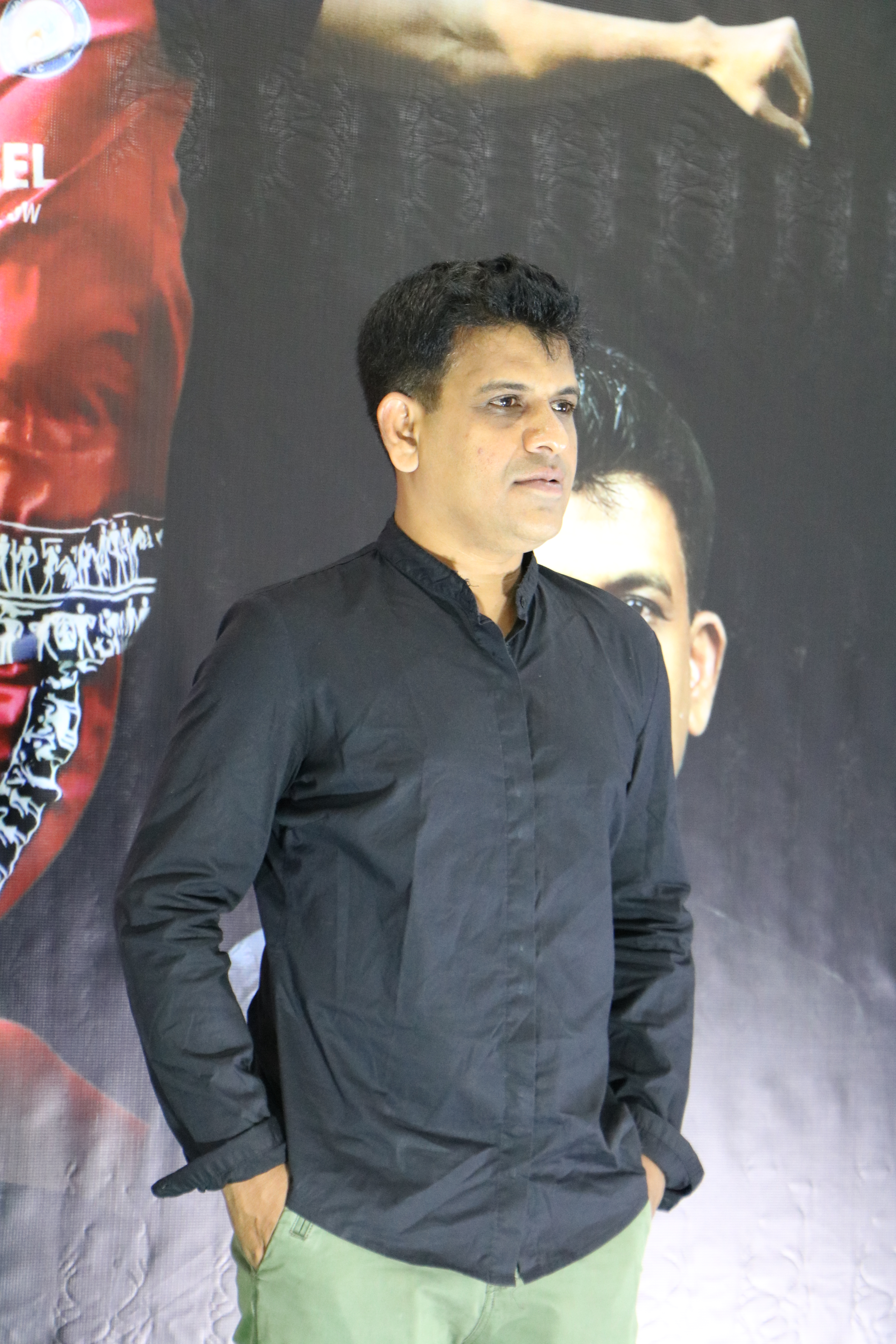
- Saheer at the Nivia Sports products launch in Doha, Qatar

Personal information
- Place of birth: Mampad, Malappuram, Kerala, India
- Position: Forward

Senior career*
| Years | Team | Apps | (Gls) |
- Kerala
- * Club domestic league appearances and goals

Asif Saheer is an Indian former football player born in Mampad, Malappuram, Kerala. He plays as a striker for State Bank of Travancore, Kerala. He is a former captain of the Kerala State soccer team and is India's all-time leading goal scorer in the Santhosh Trophy tournament. An impressive performance in sevens football in Kerala, confirmed his place in the state team for the Santosh Trophy tournament. Saheer scored eight goals in his first Santhosh Trophy tournament and became the second highest goal scorer.

Saheer was born in a middle class Muslim family to Mohamed (Valiya Manukoya), a soccer player, and Fatima, a housewife. Along with his siblings, he grew up in Mampad. He attended pre-degree at M.E.S Mampad College, Mampad. His brother Habeeb, Shafeek and Shabir Ali have represented the Kerala state team on several occasions. His uncle Mampad Rahman was a well-known international soccer player who represented Indian team for many years.

Saheer participated in the Santosh Trophy for the first time in 1999. He scored eight goals in the 2000 tournament. With 6 goals, Saheer was the second highest goal scorer of Santosh trophy 2001 which Kerala won. He captained the Kerala team which was runner-up in the Santosh Trophy in 2002.

== Honours ==
Kerala

- Santosh Trophy: 2001–02
