= Santosh Trophy =

Association football tournament in India

- Organiser(s): AIFF
- Founded: 1941; 85 years ago
- Region: India
- Teams: Group stage: 36; Final round: 12
- Related competitions: National Games
- International cup: Asian Champion Club Tournament (1967–71)
- Current champions: Services (8th title)
- Most championships: West Bengal (33 titles)
- Broadcaster(s): SSEN (online streaming); SportsKPI; SportsCast India; Prasar Bharati Sports (YouTube)
- Website: Senior NFC
- 2025–26

The Senior Men's National Football Championship for Santosh Trophy, or simply the Santosh Trophy, is an inter-state national football competition contested by the state associations and government institutions under the All India Football Federation (AIFF), the sport's governing body in India. Before the launch of the first national club league, the National Football League in 1996, the Santosh Trophy was considered the top domestic tournament in India. Many players who have represented India internationally, played in the Santosh Trophy. The tournament is held every year with eligible teams divided into zones, play in the qualifying round and can progress into the tournament proper.

The tournament was started in 1941 by the Indian Football Association (IFA), which was the then de facto governing body of football in India. It was named after the former president of the IFA, Sir Manmatha Nath Roy Chowdhury, the Maharaja of Santosh who had died aged 61 in 1939. The IFA later donated the Santosh Trophy to the AIFF, soon after its formation as the sport's official governing body in India, and since then AIFF has been organising the tournament. The trophy for the runner-up, Kamala Gupta Trophy, was also donated by the then president of IFA, Dr. S.K. Gupta, and it was named in honour of his wife. The third-place trophy, Sampangi Cup, was donated by the Karnataka State Football Association (then Mysore Football Association) and was named so in the memory of a renowned footballer, Sampangi, who was from Mysore. Until 2018, the tournament was organised as an individual competition, but since 2021, the AIFF rebranded it as the men's senior tier of National Football Championship for the regional teams of various age groups. In September 2022, it was announced that the tournament will be organized on zonal basis.

== Background ==
Santosh Trophy logo used until 2021

The Santosh Trophy was started after the former presidents of the Indian Football Association, Manmatha Nath Roy Chowdhury of Santosh, and Satish Chandra Chowdhury, donated the trophy to the All India Football Federation. At the time of the first tournament, India lacked a proper championship for football teams. The other major nationwide football competitions at the time were the Durand Cup, Rovers Cup and IFA Shield. In 1990, in an attempt to bring through more younger players, the AIFF made the Santosh Trophy into an under-23 competition. This move only lasted for three seasons before the tournament was reverted to a senior competition.

During his time as the head coach of India, Bob Houghton called for the tournament to be discontinued and said that it was a waste of time and talent. He was more aggressive against the tournament after striker Sunil Chhetri injured himself in the 2009 Santosh Trophy and had to miss the Nehru Cup. As a result, national team players were not allowed to participate in the tournament, which was also eventually reverted. In 2013 the AIFF decided that players from the top-tier clubs would be barred from participating in the Santosh Trophy, but numerous members of reserve, academy and youth sides of the I-League and the Indian Super League participate in the tournament for game-time. The tournament is still regarded as a suitable platform for young players from the I-League 2, I-League 3, or State leagues to attract major clubs.

== Current teams ==
The following teams participate in the tournament as states, union territories and institutions.

- Andaman and Nicobar Islands
- Andhra Pradesh (Andhra)
- Arunachal Pradesh
- Assam
- Bihar
- Chandigarh
- Chhattisgarh
- Dadra and Nagar Haveli and Daman and Diu
- Delhi
- Goa
- Gujarat
- Haryana
- Himachal Pradesh
- Jammu and Kashmir
- Jharkhand
- Karnataka (Mysore)
- Kerala (Travancore-Cochin)
- Ladakh
- Lakshadweep
- Madhya Pradesh (Central Provinces)
- Maharashtra (Bombay)
- Manipur
- Meghalaya
- Mizoram
- Nagaland
- Odisha (Orissa)
- Pondicherry
- Punjab
- Rajasthan (Rajputana)
- Railways
- Services
- Sikkim
- Tamil Nadu (Madras)
- Telangana
- Tripura
- Uttar Pradesh (United Provinces)
- Uttarakhand
- West Bengal (Bengal)

=== Defunct teams ===
- North-West India (1941/42–1945/46)
- Dacca (1944/45–1945/46)
- Hyderabad (1944/45–1958/59)
- Daman and Diu (until 2022/23)
- Dadra and Nagar Haveli (until 2022/23)

== Results ==
The following is the list of winners and runners-up from every edition of the Santosh Trophy

| Season | Host city | Winner | Score | Runner-up |
|---|---|---|---|---|
| 1941–42 | Calcutta | Bengal | 5–1 | Delhi |
| 1944–45 | Delhi | Delhi | 2–0 | Bengal |
| 1945–46 | Bombay | Bengal | 2–0 | Bombay |
| 1946–47 | Bangalore | Mysore | 0–0, 2–1 | Bengal |
| 1947–48 | Calcutta | Bengal | 0–0, 1–0 | Bombay |
| 1949–50 | Calcutta | Bengal | 5–0 | Hyderabad |
| 1950–51 | Calcutta | Bengal | 1–0 | Hyderabad |
| 1951–52 | Bombay | Bengal | 1–0 | Bombay |
| 1952–53 | Bangalore | Mysore | 1–0 | Bengal |
| 1953–54 | Calcutta | Bengal | 0–0, 3–1 | Mysore |
| 1954–55 | Madras | Bombay | 2–1 | Services |
| 1955–56 | Ernakulam | Bengal | 1–0 | Mysore |
| 1956–57 | Trivandrum | Hyderabad | 1–1, 4–1 | Bombay |
| 1957–58 | Hyderabad | Hyderabad | 3–1 | Bombay |
| 1958–59 | Madras | Bengal | 1–0 | Services |
| 1959–60 | Nowgong | Bengal | 3–1 | Bombay |
| 1960–61 | Kozhikode | Services | 0–0, 1–0 | Bengal |
| 1961–62 | Bombay | Railways | 3–0 | Maharashtra |
| 1962–63 | Bangalore | Bengal | 2–0 | Mysore |
| 1963–64 | Madras | Maharashtra | 1–0 | Andhra Pradesh |
| 1964–65 | Guwahati | Railways | 2–1 | Bengal |
| 1965–66 | Kollam | Andhra Pradesh | 1–1, 1–0 | Bengal |
| 1966–67 | Hyderabad | Railways | 0–0, 2–0 | Services |
| 1967–68 | Cuttack | Mysore | 1–0 | Bengal |
| 1968–69 | Bangalore | Mysore | 0–0, 1–0 | Bengal |
| 1969–70 | Nowgong | Bengal | 6–1 | Services |
| 1970–71 | Jalandhar | Punjab | 1–1, 3–1 | Mysore |
| 1971–72 | Madras | Bengal | 4–1 | Railways |
| 1972–73 | Goa | Bengal | 4–1 | Tamil Nadu |
| 1973–74 | Ernakulam | Kerala | 3–2 | Railways |
| 1974–75 | Jalandhar | Punjab | 6–0 | Bengal |
| 1975–76 | Kozhikode | Bengal | 0–0, 3–1 | Karnataka |
| 1976–77 | Patna | Bengal | 1–0 | Maharashtra |
| 1977–78 | Calcutta | Bengal | 1–1, 3–1 | Punjab |
| 1978–79 | Srinagar | Bengal | 1–0 | Goa |
| 1979–80 | Coimbatore | Bengal | 1–0 | Punjab |
| 1980–81 | Cuttack | Punjab | 0–0, 2–0 | Railways |
| 1981–82 | Thrissur | Bengal | 2–0 | Railways |
| 1982–83 | Calcutta | Bengal and Goa (joint winners) – 0–0, 0–0 | | |
| 1983–84 | Madras | Goa | 1–0 | Punjab |
| 1984–85 | Kanpur | Punjab | 3–0 | Maharashtra |
| 1985–86 | Jabalpur | Punjab | 0–0 (4–1 p) | Bengal |
| 1986–87 | Calcutta | Bengal | 2–0 | Railways |
| 1987–88 | Kollam | Punjab | 0–0 (5–4 p) | Kerala |
| 1988–89 | Guwahati | Bengal | 1–1 (4–3 p) | Kerala |
| 1989–90 | Margao | Goa | 2–0 | Kerala |
| 1990–91 | Palakkad | Maharashtra | 1–0 | Kerala |
| 1991–92 | Coimbatore | Kerala | 3–0 | Goa |
| 1992–93 | Kochi | Kerala | 2–0 | Maharashtra |
| 1993–94 | Cuttack | Bengal | 2–2 (5–3 p) | Kerala |
| 1994–95 | Chennai | Bengal | 2–1 (a.s.d.e.t.) | Punjab |
| 1995–96 | Margao | Bengal | 1–0 | Goa |
| 1996–97 | Jabalpur | Bengal | 1–0 (a.s.d.e.t.) | Goa |
| 1997–98 | Guwahati | Bengal | 1–0 | Goa |
| 1998–99 | Chennai | Bengal | 5–0 | Goa |
| 1999–00 | Thrissur | Maharashtra | 3–2 | Kerala |
| 2001–02 | Mumbai | Kerala | 3–2 (a.s.d.e.t.) | Goa |
| 2002–03 | Imphal | Manipur | 2–1 (a.s.d.e.t.) | Kerala |
| 2004–05 | Delhi | Kerala | 3–2 | Punjab |
| 2005–06 | Kochi | Goa | 3–1 (a.e.t.) | Maharashtra |
| 2006–07 | Gurgaon | Punjab | 0–0 (a.e.t.) (5–3 p) | West Bengal |
| 2007–08 | Srinagar | Punjab | 1–0 | Services |
| 2008–09 | Chennai | Goa | 0–0 (a.e.t.) (4–2 p) | West Bengal |
| 2009–10 | Kolkata | West Bengal | 2–1 | Punjab |
| 2010–11 | Guwahati | West Bengal | 2–1 | Manipur |
| 2011–12 | Odisha | Services | 3–2 | Tamil Nadu |
| 2012–13 | Kochi | Services | 0–0 (a.e.t.) (4–3 p) | Kerala |
| 2013–14 | Siliguri | Mizoram | 3–0 | Railways |
| 2014–15 | Ludhiana | Services | 0–0 (5–4 p) | Punjab |
| 2015–16 | Nagpur | Services | 2–1 | Maharashtra |
| 2016–17 | Goa | West Bengal | 1–0 | Goa |
| 2017–18 | Kolkata | Kerala | 2–2 (4–2 p) | West Bengal |
| 2018–19 | Ludhiana | Services | 1–0 | Punjab |
| 2021–22 | Manjeri | Kerala | 1–1 (5–4 p) | West Bengal |
| 2022–23 | (Saudi Arabia) Riyadh | Karnataka | 3–2 | Meghalaya |
| 2023–24 | Yupia | Services | 1–0 | Goa |
| 2024–25 | Hyderabad | West Bengal | 1–0 | Kerala |
| 2025–26 | Dhakuakhana | Services | 1–0 (a.e.t.) | Kerala |

== Performance by teams ==
| Team | Wins | Runners−up | Last win |
|---|---|---|---|
| West Bengal / Bengal | 33 | 14 | 2024–25 |
| Punjab | 8 | 8 | 2007–08 |
| Services | 8 | 5 | 2025–26 |
| Kerala | 7 | 10 | 2021–22 |
| Goa | 5 | 9 | 2008–09 |
| Karnataka / Mysore | 5 | 5 | 2022–23 |
| Maharashtra / Bombay | 4 | 12 | 1999–00 |
| Railways | 3 | 6 | 1966–67 |
| Hyderabad | 2 | 2 | 1957–58 |
| Andhra Pradesh / Andhra | 1 | 1 | 1965–66 |
| Delhi | 1 | 1 | 1944–45 |
| Manipur | 1 | 1 | 2002–03 |
| Mizoram | 1 | 0 | 2013–14 |
| Tamil Nadu / Madras | 0 | 2 | – |
| Meghalaya | 0 | 1 | – |

== Performance in Asian competitions ==
=== Asian Champion Club Tournament ===
| Year | Team | Progress | Score | Opponents | Venue(s) |
|---|---|---|---|---|---|
| 1967 | Railways | ~~Semi-finals~~ | W/O | (Israel) Hapoel Tel Aviv | Withdrew |
| 1969 | Mysore | Fourth Place | 0–2 | (Japan) Toyo Kogyo | at Bangkok, Thailand |
| 1970 | Bengal | 3rd in Group Stage | N/A | (Israel) Hapoel Tel Aviv, (Indonesia) PSMS Medan, (Thailand) Royal Thai Police | |
| 1971 | Punjab | 4th in Group Stage | N/A | (Thailand) Bangkok Bank, (Israel) Maccabi Tel Aviv, (Iraq) Aliyat Al-Shorta | |

== See also ==
- Sport in India
- History of Indian football
- Indian football league system
- Institutional League
