= Goa football team =

Goa
- Ground: Fatorda Stadium
- Capacity: 19,000
- Owner: Goa Football Association
- Head coach: Nobert Gonsalves
- League: Santosh Trophy
- 2024–25: Final round
| Home colours | Away colours | Third colours |

The Goa football team is an Indian football team representing the state of Goa in Indian state football competitions including the Santosh Trophy.

Goa made their Santosh Trophy debut in the 1964 Madras Nationals. They have appeared in the Santosh Trophy finals 13 times, and have won the trophy 5 times.

== Players and staff ==
The following 20 players were called up prior to the 2019–20 Santosh Trophy qualification:

=== Current players ===
Note: Flags indicate national team as defined under FIFA eligibility rules; some limited exceptions apply. Players may hold more than one non-FIFA nationality.

| No. | Pos. | Nation | Player |
|---|---|---|---|
| — | GK | IND | Jason D'Mello |
| — | GK | IND | Melroy Fernandes |
| — | GK | IND | Ozen Silva |
| — | DF | IND | Brian Faria |
| — | DF | IND | Matthew Gonsalves |
| — | DF | IND | Joseph Clemente |
| — | DF | IND | Clive Miranda |
| — | DF | IND | Sanson Pereira |
| — | DF | IND | Leslie Rebello (under-20) |
| — | MF | IND | Ribhav Sardesai (under-20) |
| — | MF | IND | Samuel Costa |

| No. | Pos. | Nation | Player |
|---|---|---|---|
| — | MF | IND | Velito Cruz |
| — | MF | IND | Chaitan Komarpant (under-20) |
| — | MF | IND | Moses D'Sa |
| — | MF | IND | Stendly Fernandes (under-20) |
| — | MF | IND | Denson Fernandes (under-20) |
| — | FW | IND | Joaquim Abranches (captain) |
| — | FW | IND | Devendra Murgaonkar |
| — | FW | IND | Aaren D'Silva |
| — | FW | IND | Olvin Cardozo |

=== Coaching staff ===
As of 03 February 2023

| Position | Name |
| Head coach | (India) Norbert Gonsalves |
| Assistant coach | (India) Mario Soares |
| Goalkeeping coach | (India) Sebastiao Noronha (Seby) |
| Physio | (India) Ankit Gaunkar |
| Manager | (India) Omkar Vaigankar |

== Record since 2000 ==
| Santosh Trophy record | | | | | | | | | Santosh Trophy qualification record | | | | | |
| Host/Year | Result | Position | Pld | W | D | L | GF | GA | Pld | W | D | L | GF | GA |
|---|---|---|---|---|---|---|---|---|---|---|---|---|---|---|
| Kerala; 2000 | Semi-finalists | 4th | 5 | 1 | 2 | 2 | 6 | 7 | Bye | | | | | |
| Maharashtra; 2001 | Runners-up | 2nd | 4 | 3 | 0 | 1 | 4 | 3 | Bye | | | | | |
| Manipur; 2002 | Semi-finalists | 3rd-4th | 3 | 2 | 0 | 1 | 4 | 2 | Bye | | | | | |
| Delhi; 2004 | Quarterfinal league | 5th-8th | 2 | 1 | 1 | 0 | 3 | 2 | Bye | | | | | |
| Kerala; 2005 | Champions | 1st | 4 | 3 | 1 | 0 | 12 | 2 | 3 | 3 | 0 | 0 | 32 | 0 |
| Haryana; 2006 | Quarterfinal league | 5th-6th | 3 | 1 | 1 | 1 | 4 | 4 | Bye | | | | | |
| Jammu and Kashmir; 2008 | Quarterfinal league | 5th-6th | 3 | 1 | 1 | 1 | 2 | 1 | 3 | 3 | 0 | 0 | 5 | 2 |
| Tamil Nadu; 2009 | Champions | 1st | 5 | 4 | 1 | 0 | 7 | 0 | 2 | 2 | 0 | 0 | 5 | 0 |
| West Bengal; 2010 | Semi-finalists | 3rd-4th | 4 | 3 | 0 | 1 | 9 | 1 | Bye | | | | | |
| Assam; 2011 | Quarterfinal league | 7th-8th | 3 | 0 | 2 | 1 | 3 | 6 | Bye | | | | | |
| Odisha; 2012 | Quarterfinal league | 5th-8th | 3 | 2 | 1 | 0 | 6 | 3 | ? | | | | | |
| Kerala; 2013 | Quarterfinal league | 9th-12th | 3 | 0 | 2 | 1 | 2 | 5 | 2 | 1 | 1 | 0 | 4 | 3 |
| West Bengal; 2014 | Group stage | 7th-8th | 4 | 1 | 1 | 2 | 5 | 8 | 2 | 2 | 0 | 0 | 7 | 0 |
| Punjab; 2015 | Group stage | 5th-6th | 4 | 1 | 2 | 1 | 5 | 4 | 4 | 4 | 0 | 0 | 23 | 3 |
| Maharashtra; 2016 | Semi-finalist | 3rd-4th | 5 | 3 | 1 | 1 | 5 | 2 | 4 | 4 | 0 | 0 | 20 | 2 |
| Goa; 2017 | Runners-up | 2nd | 6 | 3 | 2 | 1 | 7 | 4 | 2 | 2 | 0 | 0 | 12 | 0 |
| West Bengal; 2018 | Group stage | 5th-6th | 4 | 2 | 0 | 2 | 12 | 9 | 2 | 2 | 0 | 0 | 22 | 1 |
| Punjab; 2019 | Semi-finalist | 3rd-4th | 5 | 3 | 1 | 1 | 10 | 7 | 3 | 2 | 1 | 0 | 5 | 0 |
| Mizoram; 2020 | Tournaments suspended due to the COVID-19 pandemic | | | | | | | | 3 | 3 | 0 | 0 | 23 | 1 |
| 2021 | Tournaments suspended due to the COVID-19 pandemic | | | | | | | | Qualifiers too were not held | | | | | |
| Kerala; 2022 | Did not qualify | | | | | | | | 3 | 2 | 0 | 1 | 7 | 1 |
| Odisha; 2023 | Group stage | 11th-12th | 5 | 0 | 0 | 5 | 4 | 14 | 5 | 3 | 2 | 0 | 8 | 3 |
| Arunachal Pradesh; 2024 | Finalist | | | | | | | | 4 | 3 | 1 | 0 | 5 | 2 |

== Honours ==
=== State (senior) ===
- Santosh Trophy
  - Winners (5): 1982–83, 1983–84, 1989–90, 2005–06, 2008–09
  - Runners-up (9): 1978–79, 1991–92, 1995–96, 1996–97, 1997–98, 1998–99, 2001–02, 2016–17, 2023–24
- National Games
  - Silver medal (2): 1997, 2001
  - Bronze medal (1): 2011

=== State (youth) ===
- B.C. Roy Trophy
  - Winners (2): 1979–80, 1982–83
  - Runners-up (5): 1983–84, 1989–90, 2001–02, 2002–03, 2005–06
- Mir Iqbal Hussain Trophy
  - Winners (2): 1988–89, 1990–91
  - Runners-up (1): 1991–92
- M. Dutta Ray Trophy
  - Winners (6): 1993, 1999, 2001, 2006, 2007, 2010
  - Runners-up (1): 2000

=== Others ===
- Bordoloi Trophy
  - Runners-up (1): 1976

== See also ==
- Goans in football
