= West Bengal football team =

State football team representing West Bengal of India

West Bengal পশ্চিমবঙ্গ
- Full name: West Bengal football team
- Founded: 1941; 85 years ago (as Bengal football team)
- Ground: Salt Lake Stadium
- Capacity: 68,000
- Owner: Indian Football Association (West Bengal)
- Head coach: Sanjoy Sen
- League: Santosh Trophy
- 2024–25: Champions
Home colours	Away colours

The West Bengal football team (Bengali: পশ্চিমবঙ্গ ফুটবল দল), also known as IFA Bengal football team or earlier the Bengal football team, is an Indian football team representing West Bengal in Indian state football competitions including the Santosh Trophy. They were the second Indian team to participate in the continental top tier tournament – Asian Champion Club Tournament, by playing in the 1970 edition following Mysore in 1969.

== History ==
Bengal made its debut in the national competitions at the 1941–42 Santosh Trophy. West Bengal have appeared in the Santosh Trophy finals 47 times, having won 33 titles, the most by any team. Managed by Balaidas Chatterjee, the team won six Santosh Trophy titles between 1949 and 1959. In 1962, former Indian captain Samar Banerjee guided Bengal winning the trophy.

Prior to 2003, the team competed as "Bengal football team". On 16 August 2021, West Bengal played a friendly match against India national team at the Salt Lake Stadium and it was won by India by 1–0. In October 2022, West Bengal managed by Biswajit Bhattacharya clinched gold at the 36th National Games of India, defeating Kerala 5–0 in final.

== Team ==
The following 22 players were called up for to the 2024–25 Santosh Trophy.

Note: Flags indicate national team as defined under FIFA eligibility rules; some limited exceptions apply. Players may hold more than one non-FIFA nationality.

No.	Pos.	Nation	Player
27	GK	IND	Aditya Patra
31	GK	IND	Sourav Samanta
41	GK	IND	Shubham Roy
2	DF	IND	Bikram Pradhan
3	DF	IND	Madan Mandi
16	DF	IND	Rabilal Mandi
19	DF	IND	Ruhul Kuddus Purkait
23	DF	IND	Ayon Mondal
35	DF	IND	Juwel Ahmed Mazumder
6	MF	IND	Aditya Thapa
17	MF	IND	Vishal Das
8	MF	IND	Tarak Hembram (vice-captain)

No.	Pos.	Nation	Player
20	MF	IND	Amar Nath Baskey
26	MF	IND	Suprodip Hazra
27	MF	IND	Chaku Mandi (captain)
29	MF	IND	Basudeb Mandi
9	FW	IND	Robi Hansda
10	FW	IND	Naro Hari Shrestha
7	FW	IND	Aritro Ghosh
11	FW	IND	Abusufiyan SK
15	FW	IND	Manotos Majhi
18	FW	IND	Supriya Pandit
30	FW	IND	Israfil Dewan

== Honours ==
=== State (senior) ===
- Santosh Trophy
  - Winners (33): 1941–42, 1945–46, 1947–48, 1949–50, 1950–51, 1951–52, 1953–54, 1955–56, 1958–59, 1959–60, 1962–63, 1969–70, 1971–72, 1972–73, 1975–76, 1976–77, 1977–78, 1978–79, 1979–80, 1981–82, 1982–83 (Shared with Goa), 1986–87, 1988–89, 1993–94, 1994–95, 1995–96, 1996–97, 1997–98, 1998–99, 2009–10, 2010–11, 2016–17, 2024–25
  - Runners-up (14): 1944–45, 1946–47, 1952–53, 1960–61, 1964–65, 1965–66, 1967–68, 1968–69, 1974–75, 1985–86, 2006–07, 2008–09, 2017–18, 2021–22
- National Games
  - Gold medal (3): 1994, 2011, 2022
  - Silver medal (2): 1985, 2002
  - Bronze medal (1): 1999

=== State (youth) ===
- B.C. Roy Trophy
  - Winners (18): 1961–62, 1966–67, 1967–68, 1969–70, 1973–74, 1974–75, 1976–77, 1977–78, 1980–81, 1981–82, 1983–84, 1984–85, 1986–87, 1989–90, 1994–95, 1995–96, 2003–04, 2024–25
  - Runners-up (10): 1975–76, 1987–88, 1999–00, 2006–07, 2007–08, 2009–10, 2010–11, 2017–18, 2023–24, 2025–26
- Mir Iqbal Hussain Trophy
  - Winners (12): 1965–66, 1978–79, 1985–86, 1989–90, 1993–94, 1994–95, 1998–99, 1999–00, 2000–01, 2003–04, 2007–08, 2015–16
  - Runners-up (7): 1987–88, 1988–89, 1996–97, 2001–02, 2005–06, 2006–07, 2008–09
- M. Dutta Ray Trophy
  - Winners (6): 1992, 1996, 2000, 2002, 2004, 2005
  - Runners-up (7): 1993, 1995, 1997, 1998, 1999, 2001, 2003

== Stadiums and grounds ==
The league and tournaments are generally played at the following Stadiums and Grounds:

- Yuba Bharati Krirangan, Salt Lake
1. capacity of around 85000
2. Important matches of Local League, Shield, I-League and International Matches are played here.
- Vidyasagar Krirangan, Barasat
1. Capacity around 20,000 and Flood Light
2. Matches of Local League, Shield are played here. It is also used for holding I-League matches also.
- Sailen Manna Stadium, Howrah
1. Present capacity is only around 10,000. But ground condition is extremely good.
2. Some important CFL matches and IFA Shield are played here.
- Rabindra Sarobar Stadium
1. Capacity around 22,000.
2. Important League & Shield matches are played here.
- East Bengal/Aryan, Mohun Bagan/CFC and Mohammedan/Howrah Union Ground
1. Full capacity of these ground are 23,500, 22,000 and 15,000 respectively. All the grounds have floodlight facilities.
2. Most of the League Matches of Premier League and First Division are played here. But these grounds are available for Football only during the period from 16 May to 10 January every year.
- 10 Open Grounds in the Maidan
1. Only matches of Junior Division and other ordinary competitions are played here. These grounds are available for football only during the period from 16 May to 30 September every year.
2. Besides the above-mentioned grounds and stadium, infrastructure of SAI i.e. Sports Authority of India, Kishore Bharati Krirangan are also used.
3. Grounds available at various places in Kolkata and Howrah are used for conducting Nursery League Matches. Besides above, small stadiums are also available in almost all the Districts towns and some Sub Divisions. Most important and mentionable stadium is at Siliguri – Kanchenjunga Stadium, where International Tournament like Jawaharlal Nehru Cup was also played. Khardah, Kalyani, Burdwan, Durgapur, Midnapur, Haldia, Malda, Raigunje, Balurghat and a few other District Towns also have Stadium.
- Indoor Stadium
1. Netaji Indoor Stadium (AC), Kolkata- Capacity 12,000.

=== Salt Lake Stadium ===
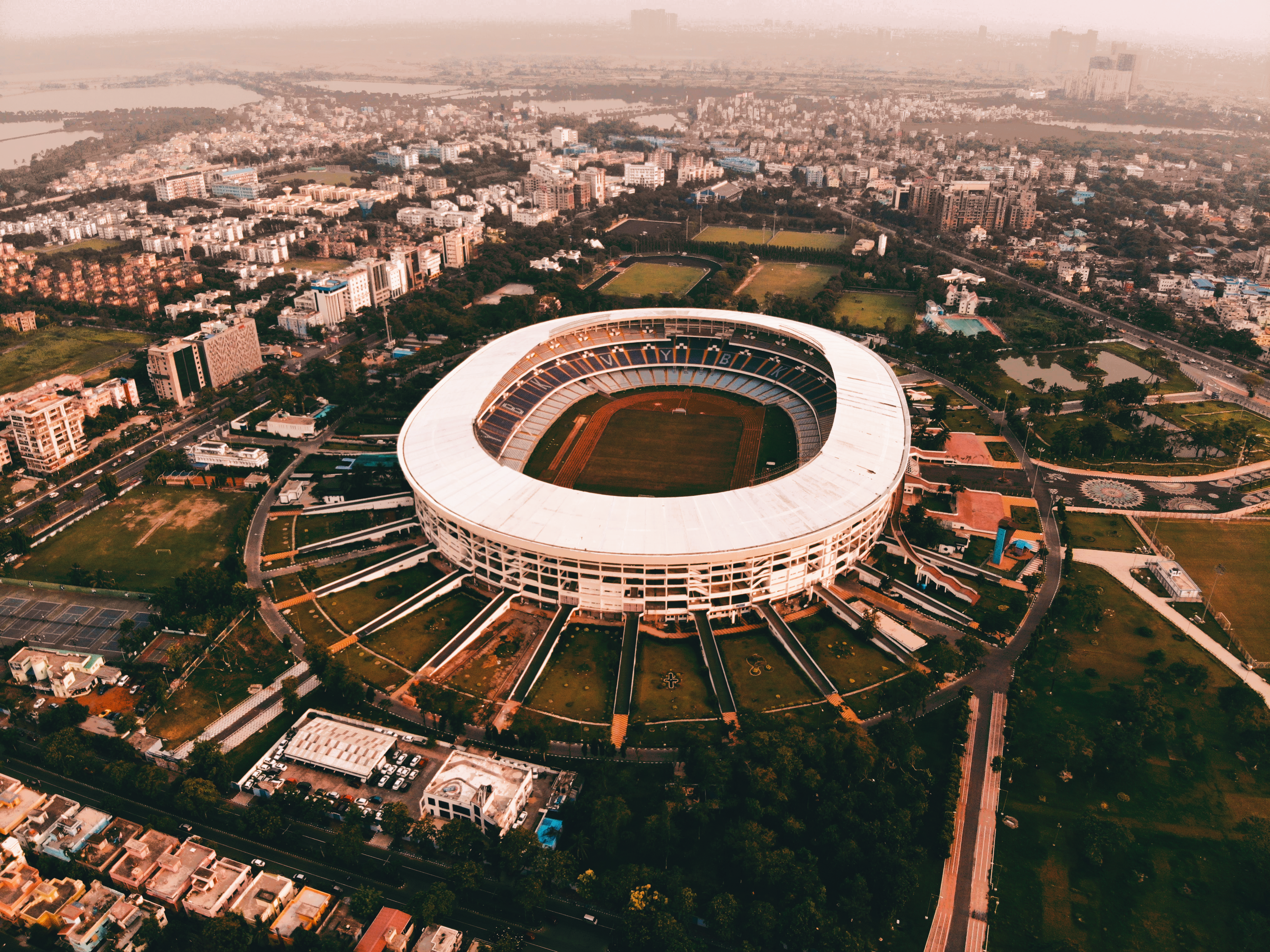
Aerial view of the Salt Lake Stadium

Yuva Bharati Krirangan (Bengali: যুবভারতী ক্রীড়াঙ্গন, English: Stadium of the Indian Youth), commonly known as Salt Lake Stadium, is a multi-purpose stadium in Bidhannagar, Kolkata, West Bengal. It is currently used for football matches and athletics. The stadium was built in 1984 and holds 120,000 people in a three-tier configuration.

It is situated approximately 10 km to the east of the Kolkata downtown and is elliptical in shape. The roof is made of metal tubes and aluminium sheets and concrete. There are two electronic score boards and control rooms. The lighting is uniformly distributed to facilitate nocturnal sports. There are special arrangements for TV broadcasting.

The stadium covers an area of 76.40 acres (309,200 m^{2}). It was inaugurated in January 1984. The salient features of the stadium are unique synthetic track for athletic meets, electronic scoreboard, main football arena measuring 105m x 70m, elevators, VIP enclosures, peripheral floodlighting arrangement from the roof-top, air conditioned VIP rest room and Conference Hall. Other features of the stadium are also commentary boxes for All India Radio and TV along with several platforms for TV cameras, press boxes, dormitories and AC. rooms, player's changing rooms, practice grounds for football, cricket and kho kho, volleyball field and an ultra-medium gymnasium. The stadium has its own water arrangements and standby diesel generation sets.

The floodlights which illuminate the stadium consist of 624 bulbs of 2 kW each and two electronic scoreboards consisting of 36,000 bulbs of 25 watt each. The four underground reservoirs have unique fire-fighting arrangements with a capacity of 10,000 gallons. The architectural and structural design of the stadium was the work of the Joint Consultants viz., M/S. Ballardie, Thompson & Matthews Pvt. Ltd. and M/S. H.K. Sen & Associates – both from Kolkata, West Bengal. The track was prepared by Reckortan Tartan Track, Germany. The electronic scoreboards were supplied by Electro Impex of Hungary.

After its inauguration in January 1984 with the Jawaharlal Nehru International Gold Cup Soccer Tournament, the Salt Lake Stadium has hosted several important international tournaments or matches such as The Pre-World Cup Tournament in 1985, Super-Soccers in 1986, 1989, 1991 and 1994, 3rd S.A.F. games in 1987, U.S.S.R. Festival in 1988, Charminar Challenger Trophy in 1992, Jawaharlal Nehru International Gold Cup in 1995. The chief engineer of the stadium is Somnath Ghosh.

The stadium also hosts different kinds of cultural programs such as dance and music concerts.

== Performance in AFC competitions ==
- Asian Club Championship: 1 appearance

Group Stage: 1970

== Notable players ==
Below the players, are notable footballers who represented the West Bengal football team.

- (India) Sailen Manna
- (India) P. K. Banerjee
- (India) Chuni Goswami
- (British rule in Burma) Fred Pugsley
- (India) Mohammed Rahmatullah
- (Pakistan) Osman Jan
- (Pakistan) (India) Balai Dey
- (India) Shabbir Ali
- (India) Samar Banerjee
- (India) Jarnail Singh
- (India) Peter Thangaraj
- (India) Krishanu Dey
- (India) Subrata Bhattacharya

== Sponsors ==
Sponsor type	Sponsor's name
Sponsor	DTDC
Co-Sponsor	
Kit Sponsor	Cosco

== See also ==
- Football in West Bengal
- History of football in India
- Football in Kolkata
