= Tamil Nadu football team =

Tamil Nadu
- Full name: Tamil Nadu football team
- Founded: 1941; 85 years ago (as Madras football team)
- Ground: Jawaharlal Nehru Stadium (Chennai)
- Capacity: 40,000
- Owner: Tamil Nadu Football Association
- Head coach: Dharmaraj Ravanan
- League: League Trophy
- 2017-18: Final round
Home colours	Away colours

The Tamil Nadu football team, also earlier the Madras football team, is an Indian football team representing Tamil Nadu in Indian state football competitions including the Santosh Trophy. They have appeared in the Santosh Trophy finals twice, in 1972–73 and 2012, and have never won. Tamil Nadu team reached semi-finals of the Santosh Trophy in 2009, where they lost to Goa. Prior to 1972, the team competed as Madras.

== Squad ==
The team selected for 2018 League Trophy;

Note: Flags indicate national team as defined under FIFA eligibility rules; some limited exceptions apply. Players may hold more than one non-FIFA nationality.

No.	Pos.	Nation	Player
1	MA	IND	Majith The Magician
2	GK	IND	Murugan V
3	DF	IND	Henry Joseph
14	DF	IND	Henry Stalin
5	DF	IND	Hari Krishnan
46	DF	IND	Karthick Thirumalai
4	DF	IND	Boobalan
3	DF	IND	Karthik
21	MF	IND	Ganesan
16	MF	IND	Sinivasan Pandiyan
13	MF	IND	Mayakkannan
38	MF	IND	Mohammed Musharaf
25	MF	IND	Jockson dhas
10	MF	IND	Suraj Kumar
—	MF	IND	Dinesh
14	FW	IND	Alexander Romario Jesuraj
16	FW	IND	Vineeth Kumar
9	FW	IND	Nandha Kumar
47	FW	IND	Devdath S
7	FW	IND	Prakadeswaran S

=== Coaching staff ===
Position	Name
Head coach	(India) Dharmaraj Ravanan
Assistant coach	(India) Agastin
Physio	(India) Kamesh

=== Player history ===
Some of the former Tamil Nadu state football players are S. Grand Durai Pandian (Chennai Customs)(Striker), Samson Gunapandian, Simon Sundararaj, J. Krishnaswamy, Raman Vijayan, Syed Sabir Pasha, Kalia Kulothungan, Robin Charles Raja, V. Soundararajan, P.M. Radhakrishnan, P. Nageshwara Rao, M. Thangaraj, Gandhi (RBI), Edwin Ross (Winger), D'Cruz (ICF), Orlando Rayen, A.U. Celestine (Goal Keeper), P.V. Sriramulu, A. Satyanarayanan, Guna Singh, Koshy, Kumar, Thomas, Arumaiyanayagam, Thanikachalam, Chandran Jeypal, Dhanapathy, Gurunathan, Viswanathan, and Rajamanickam (Goal Keeper).

Simon Sundararaj from Thanjavur, Tamil Nadu scored the last Indian goal at the Olympics, in Rome in 1960.

Most of these former players were employees of State or Central government institutions. All India Football Federation and Tamil Nadu Football Association were coordinating these players participation at the National level. In the past, to attend preparatory camps to get selected for the India national football team, it was difficult for these players to obtain leave from the institutions in which they were employed. Some Tamil Nadu football players use their football talent and achievements to get jobs in Government institutions like Southern Railways, Indian Bank, and Chennai Customs.

The following is a complete list of Tamil Nadu footballers.

- Dhanpal Ganesh
- Dharmaraj Ravanan
- Nallappan Mohanraj
- Kali Alaudeen
- C. S. Sabeeth
- Pradeep Mohanraj
- Michael Soosairaj
- Edwin Sydney Vanspaul
- Nanda Kumar
- Raegan Albarnas
- P. Sudhakar
- Michael Regin
- Sinivasan Pandiyan
- Alexander Romario Jesuraj
- C.Swaminathan

== Honours ==
=== State (senior) ===
- Santosh Trophy
  - Runners-up (2): 1972–73, 2011–12
- National Games
  - Silver medal (1): 2007
  - Bronze medal (1): 2002

=== State (youth) ===
- Mir Iqbal Hussain Trophy
  - Winners (1): 1985–86
  - Runners-up (1): 1999–2000
- M. Dutta Ray Trophy
  - Runners-up (2): 2004, 2007
