= Services football team =

Football team representing Indian defense

Services
- Full name: Services football team
- Ground: Various
- Owner(s): Services Sports Control Board; Indian Army
- Head coach: Mileswamy Govindaraju Ramachandran
- League: Santosh Trophy
- 2024–25: Semi-finals
Home colours	Away colours	Third colours

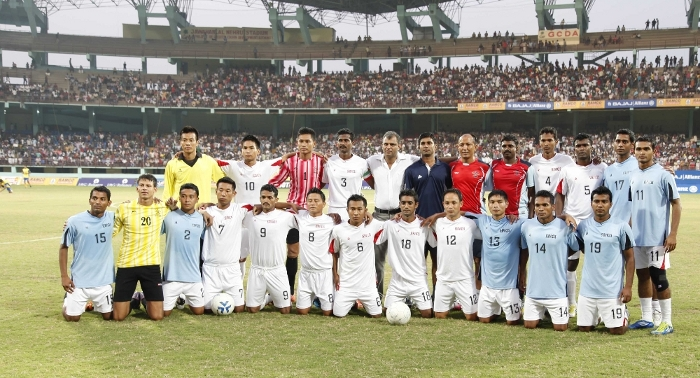
Together photo prior to 2013 Santosh Trophy final match

The Services football team is a football section of the Indian Armed Forces, representing them in various regional competitions. It is operated by the Services Sports Control Board, and competes in Santosh Trophy.

== Santosh Trophy ==
Services have appeared in the final of the Santosh Trophy ten times, and have won it seven times.

The team won their first Santosh Trophy in 1960–61 by beating Bengal 1–0 in the final. Since then, they have won the tournament another four times – 2012, 2013, 2015 and 2016. Their latest win came at the 2023–24 Santosh Trophy Golden Jubilee Stadium in Yupia, where they beat Goa 1–0 in the final.

== Honours ==
=== State (senior) ===
- Santosh Trophy
  - Winners (8): 1960–61, 2011–12, 2012–13, 2014–15, 2015–16, 2018–19, 2023–24, 2025–26
  - Runners-up (5): 1954–55, 1958–59, 1966–67, 1969–70, 2007–08
  - Third place (1): 2022–23
- National Games
  - Gold medal (1): 2023
  - Bronze medal (1): 2022

=== State (youth) ===
- M. Dutta Ray Trophy
  - Runners-up (1): 2002

=== Others ===
- IFA Shield
  - Runners-up (1): 1950
- Sikkim Gold Cup
  - Runners-up (1): 2025

== See also ==
- Army Red
- Army Green
- Indian Air Force
- Indian Navy
- Railways football team
- Assam Rifles
- Central Reserve Police Force
- Border Security Force
- CISF Protectors football team
- National Games of India
- Indian Army Service Corps
