= Karnataka football team =

Karnataka ಕರ್ನಾಟಕ ಕಾಲ್ಚೆಂಡು ತಂಡ
- Full name: Karnataka football team
- Founded: 1941; 85 years ago (as Mysore football team)
- Ground: Bangalore Football Stadium
- Capacity: 8,000
- Owner: Karnataka State Football Association
- Head coach: Ravi Babu Raju
- League: Santosh Trophy
- 2024–25: Group stage
Home colours	Away colours

The Karnataka football team (Kannada: ಕರ್ನಾಟಕ ಕಾಲ್ಚೆಂಡು ತಂಡ, romanized: Karnaṭaka kālchenḍu tanḍa), also earlier the Mysore football team, is an Indian football team representing Karnataka in Indian state football competitions including the Santosh Trophy.

They have appeared in the Santosh Trophy finals 9 times, and have won the trophy 4 times. Prior to 1972, the team competed as Mysore. During the 1969 Asian Champion Club Tournament (which is now known as AFC Champions League Elite), they reached the semifinals (then known as Mysore State).

== Squad ==
=== Current squad ===
The following 22 players were called up prior to the 2022–23 Santosh Trophy

Note: Flags indicate national team as defined under FIFA eligibility rules; some limited exceptions apply. Players may hold more than one non-FIFA nationality.

No.	Pos.	Nation	Player
10	FW	IND	Ankith P
22	GK	IND	Srijith R.
23	GK	IND	Kevin Koshy
1	GK	IND	Satyajit Bordoloi
2	DF	IND	M. Sunil Kumar
3	DF	IND	Robin Yadav
4	DF	IND	Nikhil G.
5	DF	IND	Manoj Swamy Kannan
6	MF	IND	F Lalremtluanga
9	MF	IND	Kamalesh P
14	DF	IND	Johnson A

No.	Pos.	Nation	Player
17	MF	IND	Shajan Franklin
8	MF	IND	Bekey Oram
7	MF	IND	Karthik Govind Swamy (C)
17	FW	IND	Rajaganapathy K
18	DF	IND	Prashanth Kalinga
19	DF	IND	Pradison Mariyadasan
11	FW	IND	Abhishek Shankar Powar
12	FW	IND	Shelton Paul M.
16	FW	IND	Jacob John Kattokaren
20	DF	IND	Satish Kumar M R
24	MF	IND	Appu

== Honours ==
=== State (senior) ===
- Santosh Trophy
  - Winners (5): 1946–47, 1952–53, 1967–68, 1968–69, 2022–23
  - Runners-up (5): 1953–54, 1955–56, 1962–63, 1970–71, 1975–76
- National Games
  - Bronze medal (1): 1997

=== State (youth) ===
- Swami Vivekananda NFC
  - Runners-up (1): 2023–24
- B.C. Roy Trophy
  - Winners (4): 1962–63, 1978–79, 1991–92, 2002–03
  - Runners-up (3): 1965–66, 1971–72, 2003–04
- Mir Iqbal Hussain Trophy
  - Winners (2): 1978–79, 1986–87
  - Runners-up (2): 1981, 2009–10
- M. Dutta Ray Trophy
  - Runners-up (1): 1992

== Performance in AFC competitions ==
- Asian Champion Club Tournament (now AFC Champions League)
  - Fourth place: 1969 (as Mysore State)
