= 1956–57 Santosh Trophy =

Tournament details
- Country: India
- Dates: August 17 - September 5 1956
- Teams: 17

Final positions
- Champions: Hyderabad (1st title)
- Runners-up: Bombay

Tournament statistics
- Matches played: 22
- Goals scored: 71 (3.23 per match)
- 70 minute matches

The 1956–57 Santosh Trophy was the 13th edition of the Santosh Trophy, the main State competition for football in India. It was held in 1956 in Trivandrum, Kerala. Hyderabad beat Bombay 4–1 in the replayed final.

The tournament was inaugurated by Chithira Thirunal Balarama Varma. The matches were played in the University Stadium, between 5 and 6.15 pm each day with a 5-minute interval.

== Preliminary rounds ==
17 August 1956

Punjab	2–1	Travancore-Cochin
Ramkishen 15'; Iqbal Singh 52'	Report	De Classi 40'

University Stadium, Trivandrum
Referee: Moinuddin Kasim
18 August 1956

Services	7–0	Uttar Pradesh
Alphonse 5'; Arokiaswamy 20', 33', 40'; Nicholson 52', 69'; Lama	Report

University Stadium, Trivandrum
Referee: T. V. Thomas
19 August 1956

Mysore	0–0	Orissa
	Report

University Stadium, Trivandrum
20 August 1956

Madhya Pradesh	4–1	Punjab
Devadas 10'; Muktar; Yusuf 50' 60'	Report	Iqbal Singh

University Stadium, Trivandrum
Referee: L.R. Natarajan
21 August 1956

Hyderabad	1–0	Bihar
Kannan 32'	Report

University Stadium, Trivandrum
Referee: Jayaram
22 August 1956

Mysore	4–0 replay	Orissa
Barakulla; Damodar 20' 50' 51'	Report

University Stadium, Trivandrum
25 August 1956

Delhi	1–1	Madras
Ballan Singh	Report	Syed Ali

University Stadium, Trivandrum

Inder Pal's penalty bounced off the upright. Ballan Singh scored from the rebound. Both goals were scored late in the second half.

26 August 1956

Bombay	4–0	Andhra
Nagaraj 28' 47'; Grostate 59' 69'	Report

University Stadium, Trivandrum
Referee: Bashir
27 August 1956

Delhi	2–1 replay	Madras
Ashraf 46'	Report	Rajendran

University Stadium, Trivandrum
Referee: L. R. Natarajan

In the 37th minute for Delhi, Inder Pal again missed a penalty.

28 August 1956

Rajasthan	0–0	Assam
	Report

University Stadium, Trivandrum
29 August 1956

Rajasthan	2–1 replay	Assam
Koola 14'; Barachand 18'	Report	Barua

University Stadium, Trivandrum
29 August 1956

Bengal	8–0	Madhya Bharat
S. Banerjee 18' 19' (pen.) 66' 70'; Mewalal; P. K. Banerjee; Nandy	Report

University Stadium, Trivandrum
Referee: Jayaram

Bengal led 5–0 at half time.

== Quarterfinal ==
23 August 1956

Hyderabad	2–0	Services
Kannan 4'; Zulfikar 45'	Report

University Stadium, Trivandrum
24 August 1956

Mysore	2–1	Madhya Pradesh
Damodar 63'; Sreenivas 69'	Report	Devadas 2'

University Stadium, Trivandrum
Referee: Jayaram
30 August 1956

Bombay	1–1	Delhi
Grostate 16'	Report	Inder 60'

University Stadium, Trivandrum
Referee: Chakravarthy
31 August 1956

Bombay	1–0 replay	Delhi
Grostate 65'	Report

University Stadium, Trivandrum
Referee: Chakravarthy
31 August 1956

Bengal	12–0	Rajasthan
S. Banerjee 2' 57'; Kannayan 4'; Pal (pen.); Mitra; Goswami 40'; P. K. Banerjee 46'	Report

University Stadium, Trivandrum
Referee: Natarajan

Bengal led 8–0 at half time. This was a record for the tournament since bettered by Bengal's 18–0 in 1974-75.

== Semifinal ==
1 September 1956

Hyderabad	2–0	Mysore
Narayan 31'; Zulfikar 59'	Report

University Stadium, Trivandrum
Referee: Chakravarthi
2 September 1956

Bombay	1–0	Bengal
Grostate 49'	Report

University Stadium, Trivandrum
Referee: Jayaram

This is Bombay's first win over Bengal. Bengal rested a few players including Mewalal.

== Third place match ==
3 September 1956

Mysore	1–0	Bengal
John 21'	Report

University Stadium, Trivandrum
Referee: T.V. Thomas

Mysore missed a penalty in the sixth minute. These two teams had played the final in the previous year.

== Final ==
4 September 1956

Hyderabad	1–1	Bombay
Balaram 24'	Report	D'Sa 10'

University Stadium, Trivandrum
Referee: Chakravarthy
5 September 1956

Hyderabad	4–1 replay	Bombay
Balaram 2'; Kannan 18' (?); Poonawala 26' (o.g.)	Report	Neville D'Souza 69'

University Stadium, Trivandrum
Attendance: 23,000
Referee: Chakravarthy

The own goal was when Balaram's shot was deflected into the goal. Zulfikar, Moin and Balaram provided the assists for the other three goals. Hyderabad led 4–0 at half time. Near the end of the match, Neville D'Souza's shot was helped into the net by Hussain's attempt to block.

Chithira Thirunal Balarama Varma, the Rajpramukh of Travancore–Cochin, presented the trophies. The 30 member provisional squad for the Melbourne Olympics was announced at the end of the final.

== Squads ==
- Hyderabad : Ramaswamy; Aziz (captain), Ahmad Hussain and Latif; Yousuf Khan, Noor Mohammed; Moin, Balaram, Kannan, Zulfikar and Yusuf Also Narayan, and Hanumantha Rao, Ibrahim (goal-keeper)
- Bombay : Narayan; Bhaskaran, S.J. Poonawala and David Solomon; F. D'Souza and G. Fernandez; Joe D'sa, Neville D'Souza, Linky Grostate, Nagraj and Pavithran. Also Peter Joseph
- Mysore : Varadaraj; Munithim and Muthu; Shanker Singh, Mari and Jayaram; Ramakrishna, Barakullah, Damodaran, Patrick and Sreenivas Also Nandan (goal-keeper), Dhan Singh, Narasimhaiah, Pooswamy
- Bengal : Sett; Abdul Rahman and James Fenn; P. Mitra, Sarbadhikary and Nandy; P. K. Banerjee, Chuni Goswami, Mewalal, Kittu and Kanniyan. Also Chatterjee (goal-keeper), S Guha, Kempaiah, Salam, S. Banerjee, K. Pal, Sattar. Samar Banerjee was the captain against Rajasthan, Mewalal in some other matches.
- Delhi : Hardeo; Bhim Sain and Chiranji Lal (captain); Chopra, Qureshi and Ram Swarup; Rashid, Shujaat, Inder Pal, Balam Singh and Ramesh. Also Ashraf and Kirpal Singh
- Rajasthan : Maljeesingh; Sardarkhan and Kamruddin; Cyril Thomas, B.L. Kachwala (captain) and Sarvan; J.T. Koola, Kailash Pershad, Barachand, Sathyanarayana and J.V. Fernandez. Also, Mool Singh
- Holkar : P.R. Singh; Arthur Hyde and H. M. Khar; Prahlad Singh, Narayan Singh and Naidu; Hyde jr, Mohammed Umer, Shiv Singh, A.T. Nimbalkar and Pratab Singh
- Assam : Prafulla Hazarika (captain on August 29); Md. Amanulla and Chitteswar Saikia; Barin Singh, Bilash Baruah and Nirmalya Das; Safikul Hussain, Bhakta Bahadur, Binode Brahma, Narayan Bora and Hemen Baruah. Kanak Bordoloi (captain)
- Madras : Moorthy; Balagopal and Anjenayalu; Govindan, Gurunathan and Janakiram; Syed Alvi, Devadas, Thangaraj (captain), Rajendran and Sachindanandom
- Andhra : M.G. Murthy; T. Sankara Rao and D. Appala Reddy; Col. Sriramulu, C. Dakshinamurthy and R. Varahalu; Attar Pasha, A. Aruldas, S. Venkaratamana Rao, S. Hanumantha Rao and R. Ananda Rao
- Madhya Pradesh : Nazir; Ramloo (captain) and Rangaswamy; Ibrahim, Balaya and Sunder Lal; Balakrishna, Yusuf, Devadas, Muktar and Izahar Also, Wahid
- Services : Thangaraj; D. Pearl (captain) and Prakash Singh; Vincent Paul, Mumtaz Hussain and Ajit Singh; Mukherjee, Alphonse, Rabilal Lama, Nicholson and Arokiaswamy
- Orissa : Lala Patro; A. Patro and S. K. Babu; P. N. Khalko, Gurbux Singh and R. K. Banerjee; Sham Bahadur Thapa, K. Suryanarayana, G. Samal, B. Bera and R. N. Das
- Bihar : Thakurtha; Awadesh and Thalib; Ram Balas, Ghulam Mohd and Habib; Sayed, P. Chatterjee, Shyam Sunder, S. Kanjilal (captain) and S. Ghosh
- Punjab : Chhotte Lal; Buchan and Kripal Singh; Chander Singh, Singara Singh and Garnail Singh; Iqbal Singh (captain), Bimal Mukherjee, Ram Kishen, Pawan Kumar and Om Prakash Also, Amar Singh, Jaswant Singh
- Uttar Pradesh : Mirza Ashgar; Salmon and D. Sirkar (captain); M. M. Soni, N. Osmani and Ram Bahadur; H. Pakrasi, S. S. Khanna, Mewalal Jr, J. Sanwal and Bashir
- Travancore-Cochin : George Verghese; Madhavan Nair and Peter Pereira; Indira Balan, Balakrishnan and Prakasam; Vincent George, De Classi, Stanley and A. P. Anthony

== Epilogue ==
After the final, 30 players were shortlisted for the 1956 Olympics team. The '*' indicates that the player was part of the final squad.

- Goal-keepers : *Thangaraj (Services), Chatterjee (Bengal), *Narayan (Bombay)
- Backs : *T. A. Rahman (Bengal) and Guha (Bengal), *Aziz and *Latif (Hyderabad), David Solomon (Bombay)
- Half-backs : *Kempaiah and *Nandy (Bengal), Yusuf Khan, *Salaam, *Ahmed Hussain and *Noor (Hyderabad), Prakash Singh (Services), Sunderlal (Madhya Pradesh)
- Outside-right : *P. K. Banerjee and *Kannayan (Bengal)
- Inside-right : *S. Banerjee (Bengal) and *Neville D'Souza (Bombay)
- Centre-forward : Damodaran (Mysore), *Paul (Bengal), *Kannan (Hyderabad), De Classe (Travancore-Cochin)
- Inside-left : *Zulfikar and Rahmatullah (Hyderabad), *Goswami (Bengal)
- Outside-left : *Kittu (Bengal), *Balaram (Hyderabad), Puran Bahadur (Services)
