= Mariappa Kempaiah =

Indian footballer (1932–2008)

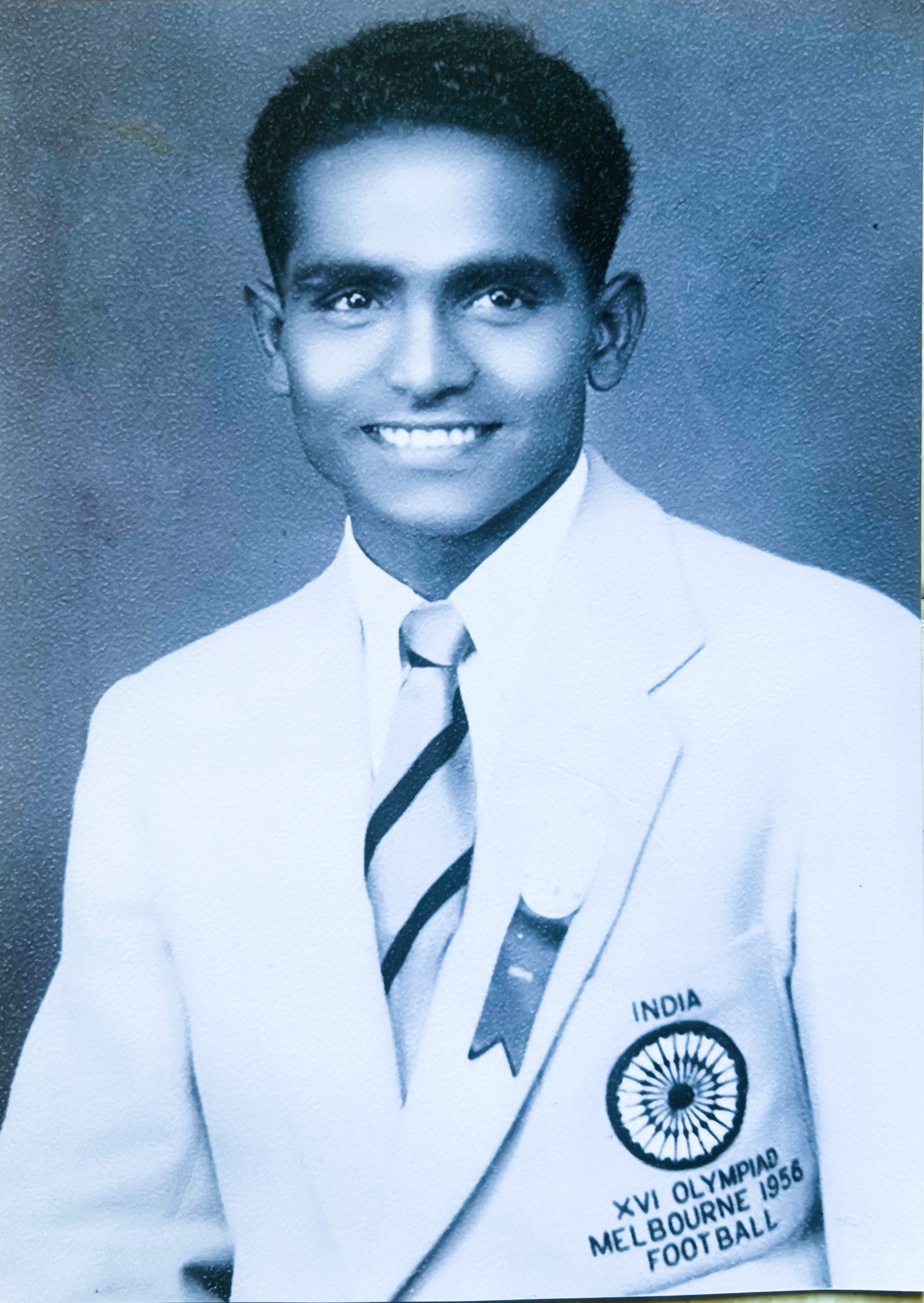
- Kempaiah with India in 1956

Personal information
- Full name: Mariappa Kempaiah
- Date of birth: 4 March 1932
- Place of birth: Bangalore, Kingdom of Mysore (now in Karnataka, British India)
- Date of death: 2 July 2008 (aged 76)
- Place of death: Bangalore, Karnataka, India
- Height: 1.64 m (5 ft 4 1/2 in)
- Position: Midfielder

Senior career*
Years	Team	Apps	(Gls)
1950–1956	Bangalore Muslims		
1956–1957	East Bengal		
1957–1965	Mohun Bagan		

International career
1953–1965	India		
- * Club domestic league appearances and goals

Mariappa Kempaiah (Kannada: [maːrijɐpːaː kempɐjːa], 4 March 1932 – 2 July 2008) was an Indian professional footballer who played as a midfielder. He played for the India national team at two Olympic Games. Known for his "fitness, work rate and commitment", he was considered one of India's best midfielders.

He had also played for India in the International Quadrangle Football tournament, played in the now Bangladesh in 1955 and in Asian Games held in Japan in 1958. At club level, Kempaiah played for Bangalore Muslims till 1956 before he moved to East Bengal where he played for a year. Between 1957 and 1965, he played for Mohun Bagan. In the inter-provincial Santosh Trophy, played for Mysore.

== Playing career ==
Kempaiah came into prominence while playing for Bangalore Muslims during the 1950s. He was subsequently discovered by Syed Abdul Rahim, then coach of the India national team, while Kempaiah played for Mysore in the Santosh Trophy in 1954 in Calcutta (now Kolkata). He made his debut for India against Sri Lanka in 1953 and was a regular in the Indian team till 1965. He was part of the team that played at the 1956 Melbourne and 1960 Rome Olympics.

Kempaiah stayed with Bangalore Muslims till 1956 and was roped into East Bengal Club by their legendary secretary JC Guha who handpicked him after his stunning performance for 1955 Santosh Trophy for Mysore which was held in Calcutta. In his very first year at the Calcutta maidan he impressed all with his ball control, distribution and tireless work load. He had outstanding performance in the Durand Cup, 1956 and facilitated East Bengal to win the Cup. While at Mohun Bagan, he was teammates of Chuni Goswami, Jarnail Singh and Peter Thangaraj.

Goswami said of Kempaiah, "He never got tired. His tackling, blocking and clearing were excellent. It was for these qualities that he had such a long stint in the Indian team." P. K. Banerjee recalled, "He generally played as right half, but was equally proficient in the central midfield position. He was a tremendous fighter and never got scared."

=== 1956, and 1960 Olympics ===
At the 1956 Olympics in Melbourne, India attained its best outing at the Games as they reached the semi-finals of the tournament. The team was led by Samar Banerjee and India's most successful coach Syed Abdul Rahim, who coached the team at both the 1952 and 1960 Olympics. Kempaiah, a competent midfielder, played a crucial role in the 1956 Melbourne Olympics, where India finished fourth, losing to Bulgaria in the play-off for third place. India reached the first round without playing a scheduled preliminary match. The team received a walkover because Hungary did not play. The team beat hosts Australia 4–2 and reached the semi-finals becoming the first Asian team to do so in Olympic history. At the match against Australia Neville D'Souza scored a hat trick. He scored two goals in the first half at the ninth and 33rd minutes. The first was a nod to the rebound from captain Samar Banerjee's shot to the opponent's post. Then in the 33rd minute D'Souza converted a cross from P. K. Banerjee who sent the ball into the net from the right flank. A third goal was scored in the second half at the 50th minute when Banerjee converted a free ball received from a melee between Indian striker Muhammad Kannayan and Australian goalkeeper Ron Lord. The fourth Indian goal was scored by J. Krishnaswamy at the 80th minute. Bruce Morrow scored two goals for the hosts.

However, India failed to reach the final losing to Yugoslavia by 4–1 in the semi-finals. There were no goals scored in the first half. D'Souza scored the opening goal in the match for India at the 52nd minute, but in the next 15 minutes Yugoslavia scored three goals at the 54th, 57th and 65th minutes. A mistake by Indian defender Muhammad Salaam led to an own goal at the 78th minute ensuring Yugoslavia's victory in the match. After the loss, India faced Bulgaria in the bronze medal match where they were again defeated by a score of 3–0. With four goals Neville D'Souza became joint top scorer in that edition of the Games with Todor Veselinović of Yugoslavia and Dimitar Stoyanov of Bulgaria. At 1960 Olympics in Rome, India was placed in a group with strong sides from Hungary, France and Peru. The team was led by P. K. Banerjee under the coaching of Syed Abdul Rahim. Tulsidas Balaram scored two goals, one each in the matches against Hungary and Peru, both of which India lost. In the second match Banerjee's goal in the 71st minute would help India hold France to a draw. With two losses and a draw, India placed at the bottom of the group and failed to move to the next round. This was the last time India qualified for the Olympics in football.

== Biography ==
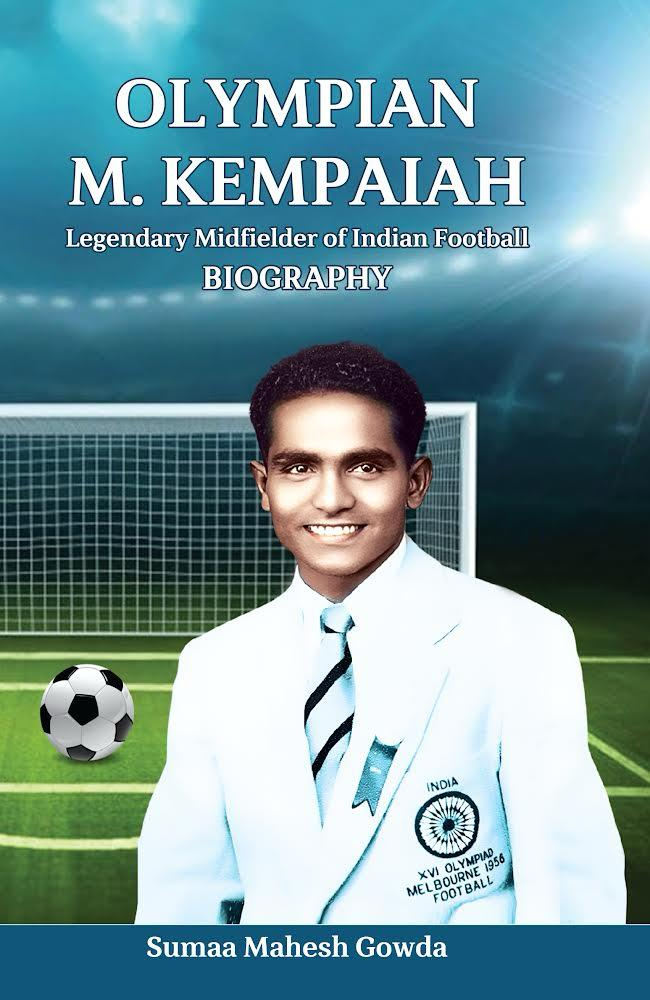
Biography of Mariappa Kempaiah.

In 2024 biography Olympian M. Kempaiah - Biography of Legendary Midfielder of Indian Football was written and published by his second daughter Mrs. Sumaa Mahesh Gowda. This book covers the journey of the Olympian achievements during his era. Amidst the 2024 AFC Asian Cup in Doha, the book was launched on 25 January, in the presence of Windsor John, the General Secretary of the Asian Football Confederation (AFC). On 20 January 2024, this book was pre-launched by launched by Sunil Chhetri, then captain of the India national team, Igor Štimac, then head coach of the team, and Indian players during the reception hosted by the Embassy of India in Doha.

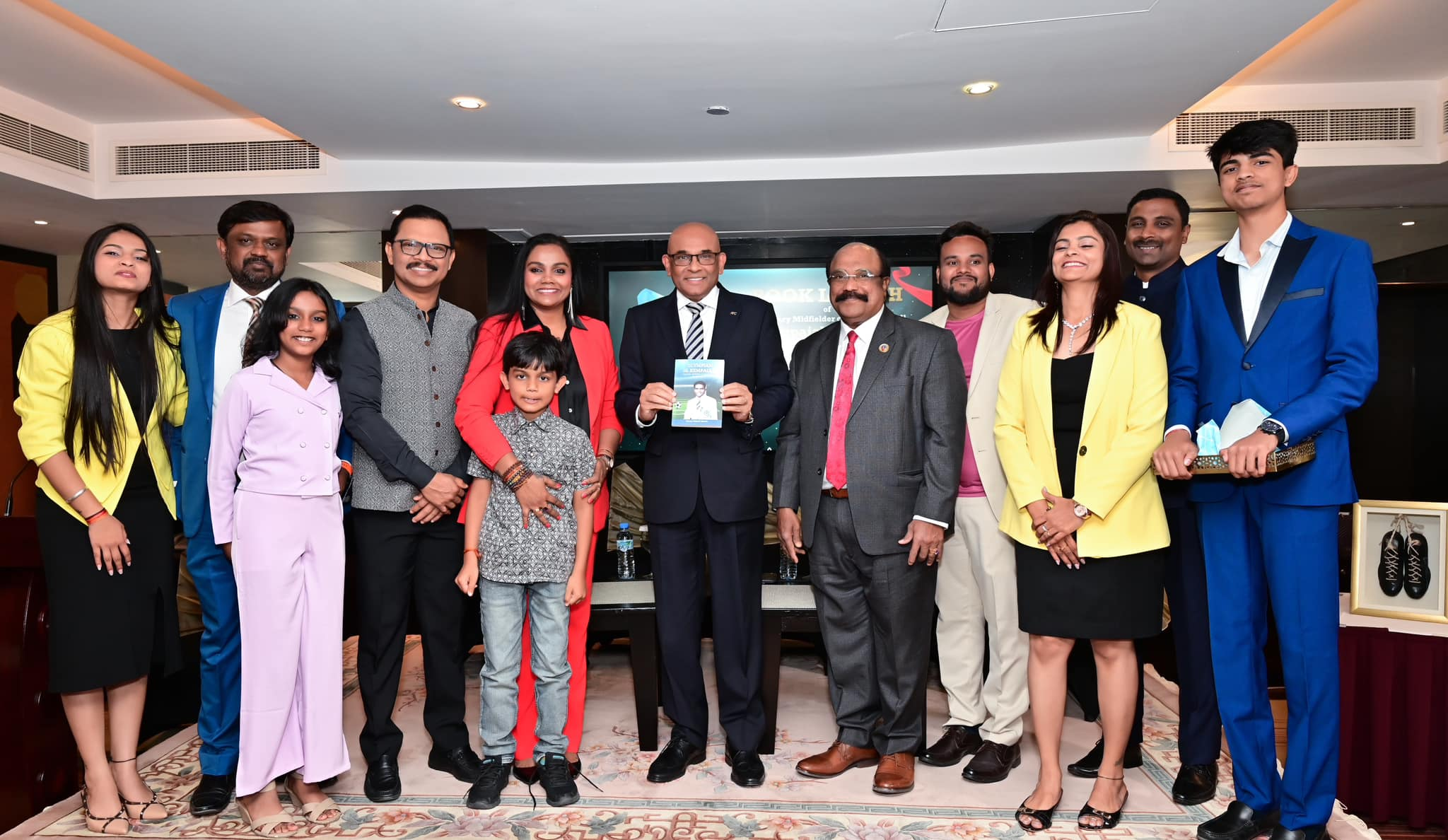
Book Launch by Windsor John, the General Secretary of AFC..

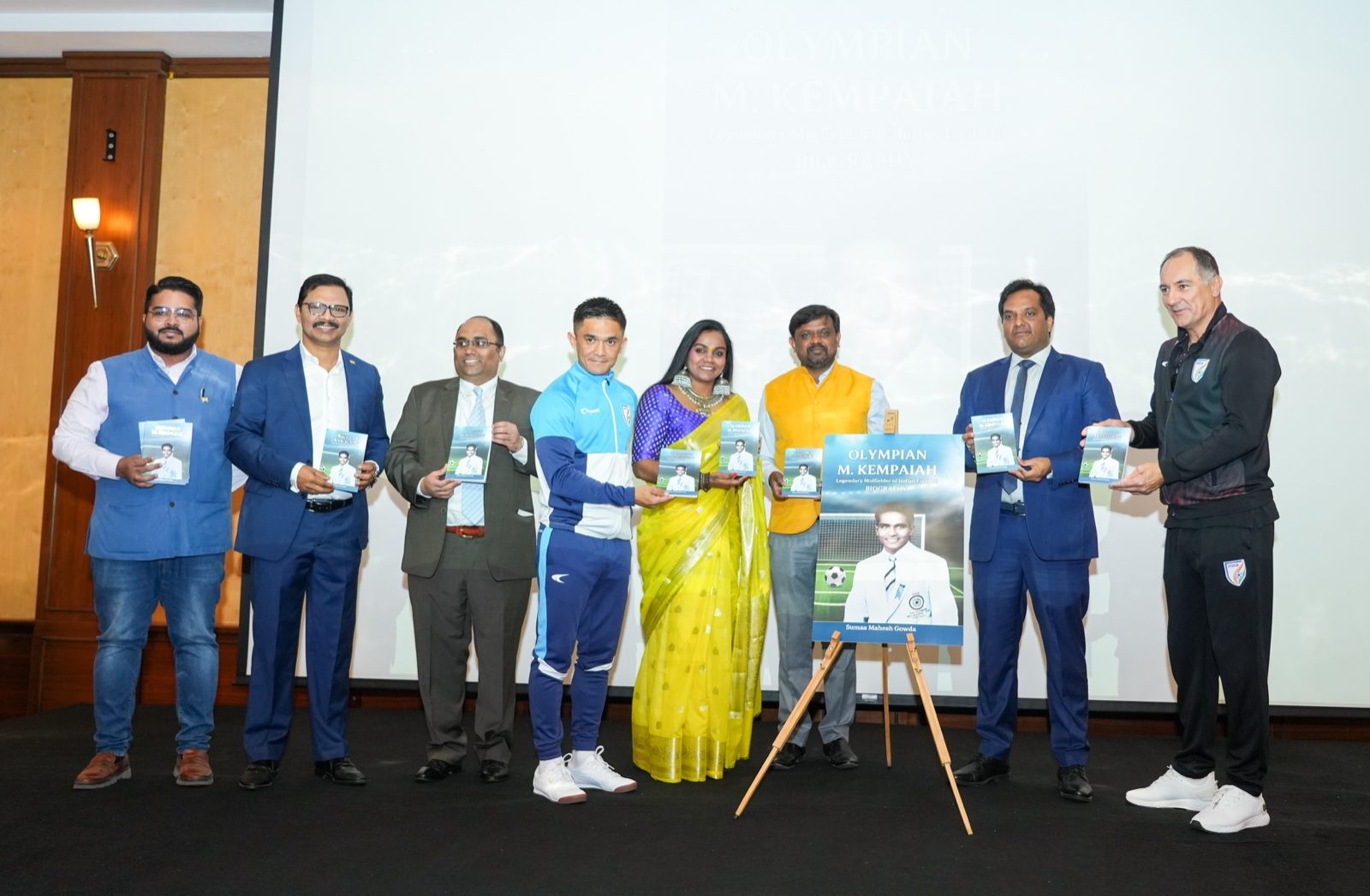
Pre-launched by Sunil Chhetri & Igor Štimac, the then captain and coach of the national team at the Embassy of India in Doha.

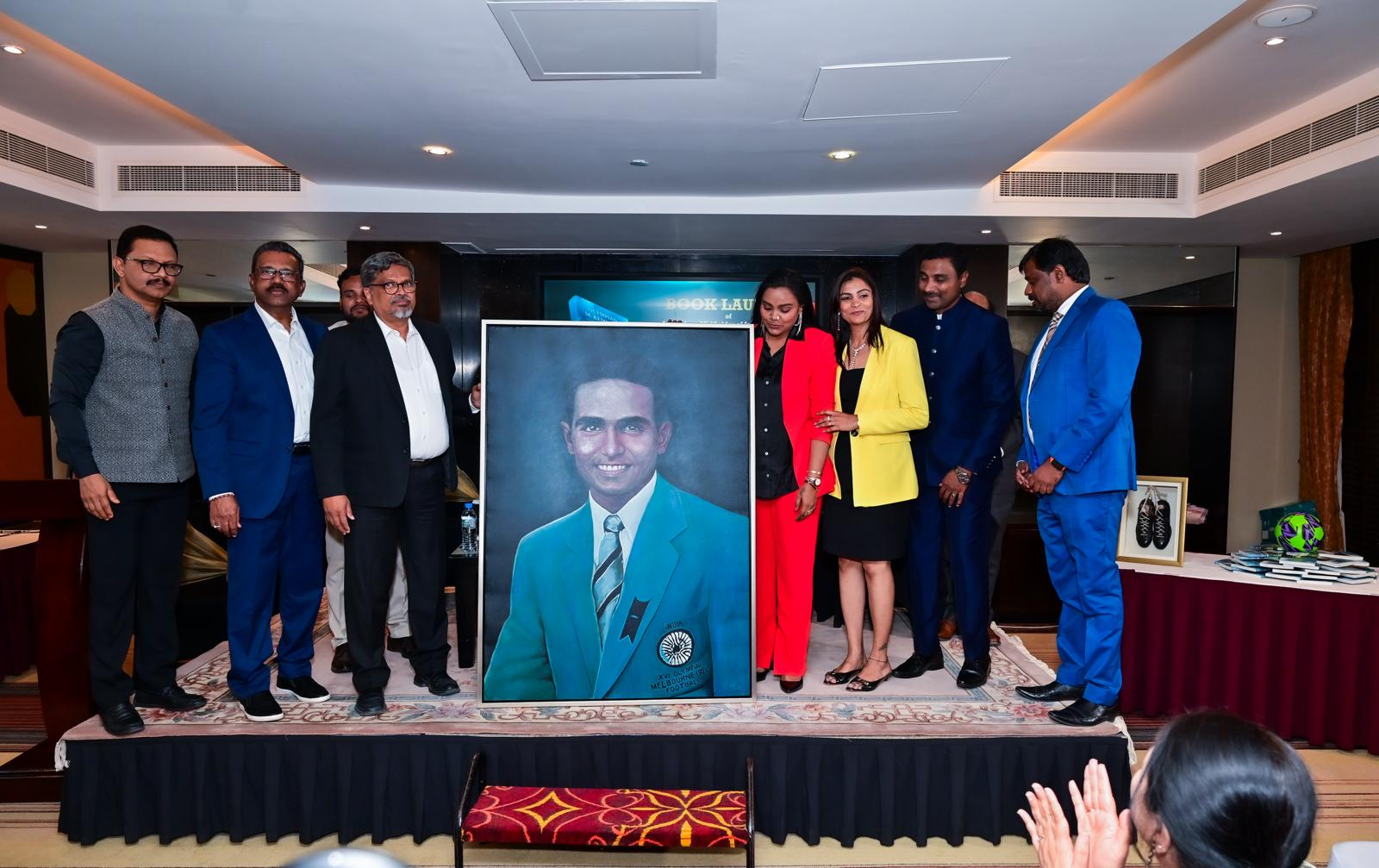
Gallery International presented a life-size portrait of Kempaiah to the family members.

== Individual honours and appreciations ==
Kempaiah won numerous awards during his playing career as well as after retirement for his contribution to Indian football.

The major awards won by him are:

- Best Wing Half Award: 1962
- Facilitated by the Karnataka chief minister for his achievement in sports in 1968
- Award from the Karnataka Football Association in 1983
- Sportsman of the Millennium: 2000

== Death ==
Kempaiah died in Bengaluru on Wednesday, 2 July 2008, after a prolonged illness with diabetes.

== Other activities ==
Kempaiah was always an athletic person. He was a boxer before choosing football as a career and also had a lot of long-distance runs under his belt before his passion for football arose.

== Honours ==
Mohun Bagan

- Durand Cup: 1959, 1960, 1963, 1964, 1965
- IFA Shield: 1960, 1961, 1962
- Calcutta Football League: 1959, 1960, 1962, 1963, 1964, 1965

India

- Asian Quadrangular Football Tournament Winner: 1955
- Merdeka Tournament runner-up: 1959
- 1956 Summer Olympics Fourth Place: 1956

Bengal

- Santosh Trophy: 1958–59

Individual

- Sportskeeda All time Indian Football XI

== See also ==
- History of Indian football
- History of the India national football team
- India national football team at the Olympics
- List of India national football team hat-tricks

== Bibliography ==
- Kapadia, Novy (2017). Barefoot to Boots: The Many Lives of Indian Football. Penguin Random House. ISBN 978-0-143-42641-7.
- Martinez, Dolores; Mukharjiim, Projit B (2009). Football: From England to the World: The Many Lives of Indian Football. Routledge. ISBN 978-1-138-88353-6. Archived from the original on 2 July 2022.
- Nath, Nirmal (2011). History of Indian Football: Upto 2009–10. Readers Service. ISBN 9788187891963. Archived from the original on 22 July 2022.
- Dineo, Paul; Mills, James (2001). Soccer in South Asia: Empire, Nation, Diaspora. London, United Kingdom: Frank Cass Publishers. ISBN 978-0-7146-8170-2. Archived from the original on 25 July 2022.
- Majumdar, Boria; Bandyopadhyay, Kausik (2006). A Social History Of Indian Football: Striving To Score. Routledge. ISBN 9780415348355. Archived from the original on 29 June 2021.
- Basu, Jaydeep (2003). Stories from Indian Football. UBS Publishers' Distributors. ISBN 9788174764546. Archived from the original on 11 October 2022.
- Sengupta, Somnath (14 May 2018). "Legends of Indian Football : Peter Thangaraj". thehardtackle.com. Mumbai: The Hard Tackle. Archived from the original on 13 April 2021.
