= 1958–59 Santosh Trophy =

National Football Championship

Tournament details
- Country: India
- Dates: 20 February – 11 March 1958
- Teams: 8 (final phase)

Final positions
- Champions: Bengal (9th title)
- Runners-up: Services

Tournament statistics
- Matches played: 17
- 70 minute matches

The 1958–59 Santosh Trophy was the fifteenth edition of the Santosh Trophy, the main territorial football competition in India. It was held in the Corporation Stadium, Madras, Tamil Nadu.

Eight teams that qualified from the four Zonal leagues met in the final tournament. This was the first tournament that had a league stage. The matches were of 70 minutes duration and were played from 5.10 pm on each day. The tournament was inaugurated by the Madras Governor Bishnuram Medhi.

For the cheapest gallery, the ticket for the matches were Rs. 0.75 (Re. 1 for the final) and a season ticket of Rs. 10. For the costliest stands in West and North of the ground, the season ticket was Rs. 30, Rs. 2.50 for individual matches and Rs.3 for the semifinals and the final. All India Radio covered the semifinal and final matches.

Bengal defeated Services 1–0 in the final. The trophy was presented by C. Subramaniam, the finance minister of the Madras state, to the Bengal captain and goalkeeper R. Guha. The two time defending champions Hyderabad defeated Bengal in the league but lost to Services in the semifinal. Hyderabad competed as Andhra Pradesh from the next season.

== League ==
=== Group A ===
| Pos | Team | Pld | W | D | L | GF | GA | GD | Pts | Qualification |
|---|---|---|---|---|---|---|---|---|---|---|
| 1 | Bombay | 3 | 2 | 1 | 0 | 8 | 1 | +7 | 5 | Advance to the semifinal |
| 2 | Services | 3 | 1 | 2 | 0 | 3 | 1 | +2 | 4 | Advance to the semifinal |
| 3 | Bihar | 3 | 1 | 1 | 1 | 2 | 7 | −5 | 3 | |
| 4 | Mysore | 3 | 0 | 0 | 3 | 1 | 5 | −4 | 0 | |

Source: Indian Express

| Bombay | 6-0 | Bihar |

Corporation Stadium, Madras
28 February 1959

| Bombay | 2-1 | Mysore |
|---|---|---|
| Charles 40'; Neville D'Souza | Report | John |

Corporation Stadium, Madras
Referee: Bhattacharjee (Delhi)
2 March 1959

| Bombay | 0-0 | Services |
|---|---|---|
| | Report |

Corporation Stadium, Madras
Referee: Bhattacharjee (Delhi)

=== Group B ===
| Pos | Team | Pld | W | D | L | GF | GA | GD | Pts | Qualification |
|---|---|---|---|---|---|---|---|---|---|---|
| 1 | Hyderabad | 3 | 3 | 0 | 0 | 6 | 1 | +5 | 6 | Advance to the semifinal |
| 2 | Bengal | 3 | 2 | 0 | 1 | 7 | 2 | +5 | 4 | Advance to the semifinal |
| 3 | Madras | 3 | 1 | 0 | 2 | 4 | 5 | −1 | 2 | |
| 4 | Delhi | 3 | 0 | 0 | 3 | 2 | 11 | −9 | 0 | |

Source: Indian Express

| Madras | 4-0 | Delhi |

Corporation Stadium, Madras

| Hyderabad | 4-1 | Delhi |

Corporation Stadium, Madras

| Bengal | 3-1 | Delhi |

Corporation Stadium, Madras
27 February 1959

| Bengal | 4-0 | Madras |
|---|---|---|
| Damodar 10', 20'; Banerjee 34'; Goswami 68' | Report |

Corporation Stadium, Madras
Attendance: 10,000
Referee: D'Mello (Bombay)
1 March 1959

| Hyderabad | 1-0 | Madras |
|---|---|---|
| Kannan | Report |

Corporation Stadium, Madras
Referee: Sen (Bengal)
2 March 1959

| Hyderabad | 1-0 | Bengal |
|---|---|---|
| Kannan 70' | Report |

Corporation Stadium, Madras
Attendance: 10,000

== Semifinals ==
5 March 1959

| Services | 5-2 | Hyderabad |
|---|---|---|
| Jayaraman 23', 69'; Lahiri 27', 30', 35' | Report | Yousuf 18'; Hameed 44' |

Corporation Stadium, Madras
Referee: Bhattacharjee (Bengal)
6 March 1959

| Bengal | 1–1 | Bombay |
|---|---|---|
| Balaram 18' | Report | Jaffar 53' |

Corporation Stadium, Madras
Referee: Bhattacharjee (Delhi)
7 March 1959

| Bengal | 2–2 (a.e.t.) replay | Bombay |
|---|---|---|
| Damodaran 27'; Goswami 50' | Report | Balan 40'; Devdas 70' |

Corporation Stadium, Madras
Referee: Bhattacharjee (Delhi)
9 March 1959

| Bengal | 2–1 replay | Bombay |
|---|---|---|
| Goswami 14'; Balaram 53' | Report | Mustaq 40' |

Corporation Stadium, Madras
Referee: Moinuddin

== Final ==
11 March 1959

| Bengal | 1–0 | Services |
|---|---|---|
| Balaram 5' | Report |

Corporation Stadium, Madras
Attendance: 20,000
Referee: Basheer Ahmed (Madras)

The final was originally scheduled for Sunday, March 8, but got postponed because of the semifinal replays. Balaram scored goal in the fifth minute, assisted by Damodaran. Cutting in from the left, he scored with a left footed shot into the far top corner. Balaram hit the upright twice, in the 10th minute and just before the end of the game.

== Squads ==
- Bengal : R Guha; Mustaq Ahmed, Rahman; Kempaiah, Ahmed Hussain, Mohammad Ali; P. K. Banerjee, A. Shome, Damodaran, Goswami and Balaram. Also Narayan, B. Mondal, Kaloo, Ram Bahadur, Varalu, Rahmatullah, S. Guha, Nandy. Coach : AK Sinha, Manager : Saroj Bose
- Bombay : Narayan; Chandrasekhar, Latif; Shetty, Sanil, Anthony; Jaffar, Franco, Neville D'Souza, Devdas, Norris. Also Ayub, Balan, Aroon, Charles
- Hyderabad : Nabi; Aziz, Abdul Hassan; Patrick, Kaleem and Yousuf ; Moin, Hameed, Kannan, Zulfiqar, Yousuf
- Services : Thangaraj; Sadasivan Nair, V Paul; Mumtaz Hussain, Aruldas and Doraiswamy; Chacko, Lahiri, Cherian, Puran Bahadur, Jayaraman; Also Ethiraj
- Madras : Munuswamy; Balagopal(c), Williams; Purushothaman, Janakiram, Veeraraghavan; Fernandez, Siva, Thomas, Arumugham, Ponnuraj. Also Stephen (gk), Kuppuswamy, Ramaswamy, Padmanabhan
- Mysore : Nandan; Zahir, Muthu; Sebastian, Basavannah, Nanjappa; John, Najeebullah, Anthony, Latif Khan, Arumanayagam
