= 1952 Durand Cup final =

- Event: 1952 Durand Cup
East Bengal	Hyderabad City Police
1	0
- Date: 23 November 1952
- Venue: Delhi Gate Stadium, New Delhi, India
- Referee: Major F. Upfold

The 1952 Durand Cup final was the 49th final of the Durand Cup, the oldest football competition in India, and was contested between Kolkata giant East Bengal and Hyderabad City Police on 23 November 1952 at the Delhi Gate Stadium in New Delhi.

East Bengal won the final 1–0 to claim their 2nd Durand Cup title. Pansanttom Venkatesh scored the only goal for East Bengal in the final as East Bengal lifted their second Durand Cup title.

== Route to the final ==
East Bengal		Round	Hyderabad City Police	
Opponent	Result	Round	Opponent	Result
Eastern India Railway	2–0	Quarter–Final	8th Gorkha Rifles	1–0
Hindustan Aircraft	2–0	Semi–Final	Aryan	0–0; 1–0

== Match ==
=== Summary ===
The Durand Cup final began at the Delhi Gate Stadium in New Delhi on 23 November 1952 in front of a packed crowd as Kolkata giant East Bengal and faced Hyderabad City Police. East Bengal, the defending champions, reached their second consecutive Durand Cup final after defeating Hindustan Aircraft 2–0 in the semi-final. Hyderabad City Police also made their second appearance in the final after they defeated Aryan 1–0 in the semi-final, having previously won the cup in 1950.

East Bengal and Hyderabad City Police, both tried to take control of the game from the first minute, however, neither could break the deadlock until three minutes before the halftime, when Ramana found Pansanttom Venkatesh free inside the box with a measured pass, who made no error to find the net and make it 1–0 for East Bengal. Hyderabad got perhaps the easiest chance to equalise just two minutes later but Mahmood missed the chance. In the second half, Hyderabad went all out to find the equaliser but were denied by the East Bengal defence led by Dorailingam and Dr. P. Kumar as East Bengal managed to hold onto the scoreline and successfully defend their Durand Cup title, thus becoming the first Indian team to win the Durand Cup more than once.

=== Details ===
23 November 1952
16:00 IST

East Bengal	1–0	Hyderabad City Police
Venkatesh 22'

Delhi Gate Stadium, New Delhi
Attendance: 10,000 (est.)
Referee: Major F. Upfold

East Bengal	Hyderabad City Police

GK	(India) Manilal Ghatak
FB	(India) Dorailingam
FB	(India) Dr P.Kumar
HB	(India) G. R. Gokul
HB	(India) Chandan Singh
HB	(India) S. Ray
FW	(India) Muhammad Kannayan
FW	(India) M. Apparao
FW	(India) Pansanttom Venkatesh (c)
FW	(India) Ahmed Khan
FW	(India) Ramana

GK	(India) A. Raya
FB	(India) Sayed Khwaja Aziz-ud-Din
FB	(India) Sk. Azam
HB	(India) Anthony Patrick
HB	(India) Sk. Jamal
HB	(India) Muhammad Noor (c)
FW	(India) Syed Moinuddin
FW	(India) G.Y.S. Laiq
FW	(India) Doraiswami
FW	(India) Sussay
FW	(India) Mahmood

Match rules

- 50 minutes.
- Replay if scores still level.
- No Substitutes.
