= Hussain Ahmed (footballer) =

Indian footballer (1932–2021)

Personal information
- Date of birth: 1932
- Place of birth: Hyderabad, Hyderabad State, British India
- Date of death: 16 April 2021 (aged 88–89)
- Place of death: Bengaluru, Karnataka, India
- Height: 1.74 m (5 ft 8 1/2 in)
- Position: Midfielder

Senior career*
Years	Team	Apps	(Gls)
- Hyderabad City Police
- Mohammedan Sporting

International career
- India
- * Club domestic league appearances and goals

Hussain Ahmed (1932 – 16 April 2021) was an Indian footballer. He competed in the men's tournament at the 1956 Summer Olympics. He played for the Hyderabad City Police team in the 1950s, as well as taking part at the 1958 Asian Games and the Merdeka Tournament in 1959.

Hussain began his journey with Osmania University football team that won all India inter-varsity title in 1954. He represented Hyderabad in Santosh Trophy for three consecutive years. He died from COVID-19 on 16 April 2021.

== Club career ==
Hussain Ahmed began his club football with Hyderabad City Police FC, one of the strongest sides in Indian football.

Hussain was part of Hyderabad's golden generation of players which turned the spotlight on itself by winning the 1956 Santosh Trophy in Trivandrum. He played as a central defender.

He later moved to Kolkata and captained Mohammedan Sporting for over a decade and created history when his side became the first Indian team to win the 1960 Aga Khan Gold Cup in Dhaka. Hussain also won the Rovers Cup with Mohammedan in 1959.

Born in 1932, he started his career with Hyderabad Police under the legendary coach Syed Abdul Rahim. He later moved to Kolkata in 1957 where he played for Mohammedan Sporting Club for over a decade.

== International career ==
Hussain was a part of the golden era of India national football team in the 1950s. India won the gold medal in the 1951 Asian Games and finished fourth in the 1956 Olympic Games. A product of Nizam College, Hyderabad, Hussain was a tenacious defender known for tight marking and hard tackling.

He was a member of the 1956 Melbourne Olympics Indian football team, that reached the semi-finals. He also took part in the 1958 Asian Games in Tokyo, Japan. Ahmed Hussain made his debut against Bulgaria on 7 December 1956 and went on to make 11 appearances for India.

His teammates under coach Syed Abdul Rahim at th 1956 Melbourne Olympics and 1958 Tokyo Asian Games were like: Peter Thangaraj, Nikhil Nandy, Samar Banerjee, P. K. Banerjee, Kesto Pal, Neville Stephen D'Souza, Tulsidas Balaram, Abdul Latif, Mariappa Kempiah, Chuni Goswami, Kannan, Mohammed Rahmatullah.

Ahmed also appeared with the Indian team that finished as runners-up at the 1959 Merdeka Tournament.

== Coaching career ==
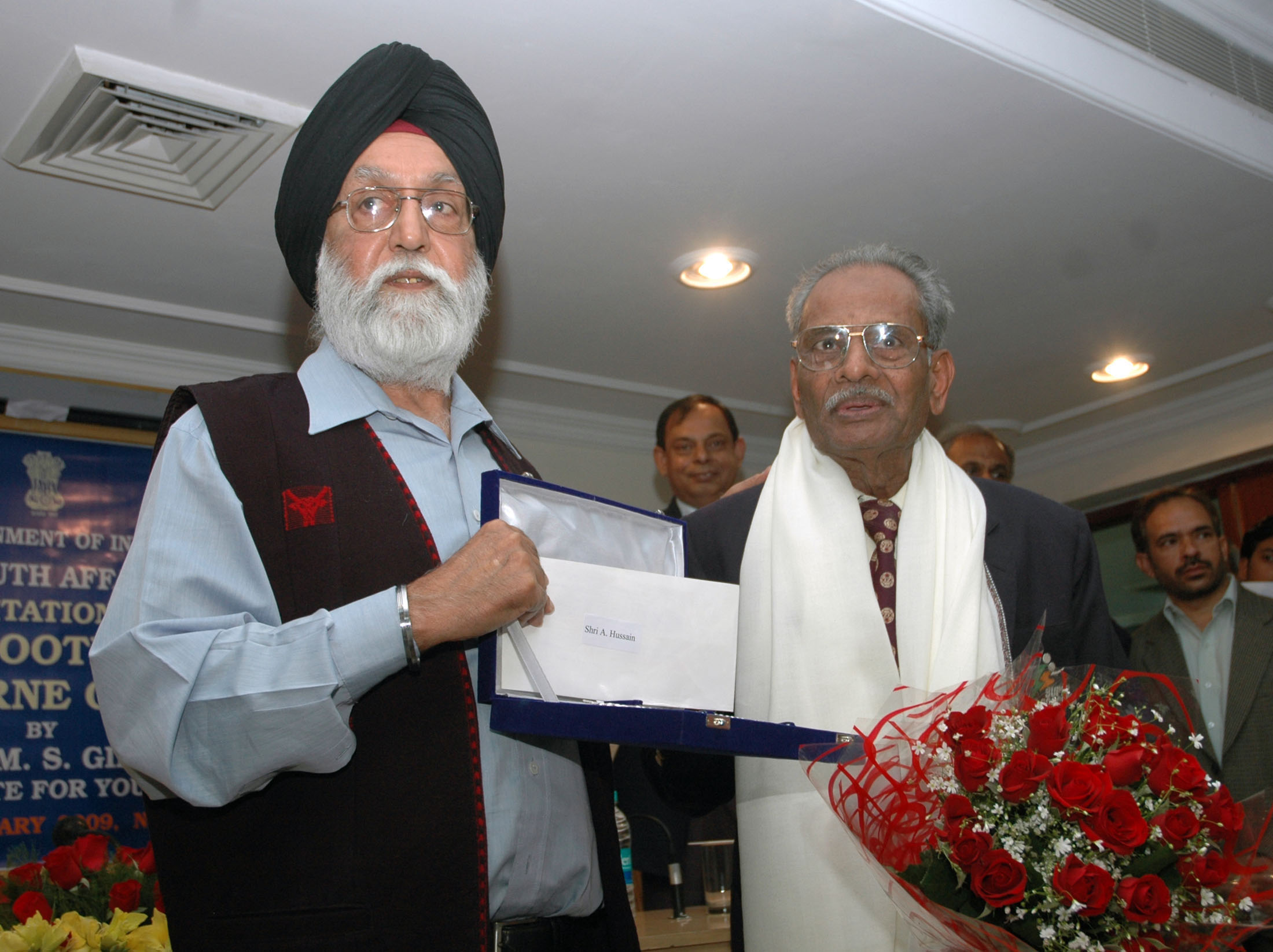
Ahmed being felicitated by Minister of Youth Affairs & Sports, Dr. M.S. Gill, in New Delhi, February 23, 2009.

Apart from his display in the 1956 Olympics when India finished fourth, Hussein Saab has contributed immensely as a coach with Sports Authority of India in Bangalore. In 2009, Hussaen along with compatriots of the 1956 Melbourne Olympics, were felicitated by the sports minister M. S. Gill in honour of their achievements.

== Honours ==
Osmania University

- All-India Inter-University championship: 1954

Hyderabad

- Santosh Trophy: 1956–57

Bengal

- Santosh Trophy: 1958–59

Mohammedan Sporting

- Calcutta Football League: 1957
- IFA Shield: 1957
- Aga Khan Gold Cup: 1960
- Rovers Cup: 1955, 1957, 1958
- Durand Cup: runner-up 1959

India

- Merdeka Tournament runner-up: 1959

== Bibliography ==
- Kapadia, Novy (2017). Barefoot to Boots: The Many Lives of Indian Football. Penguin Random House. ISBN 978-0-143-42641-7.
- Martinez, Dolores; Mukharjiim, Projit B (2009). Football: From England to the World: The Many Lives of Indian Football. Routledge. ISBN 978-1-138-88353-6. Archived from the original on 2 July 2022.
- Nath, Nirmal (2011). History of Indian Football: Upto 2009–10. Readers Service. ISBN 9788187891963. Archived from the original on 22 July 2022.
- Dineo, Paul; Mills, James (2001). Soccer in South Asia: Empire, Nation, Diaspora. London, United Kingdom: Frank Cass Publishers. ISBN 978-0-7146-8170-2. Archived from the original on 25 July 2022.
- "Triumphs and Disasters: The Story of Indian Football, 1889—2000" (PDF). Archived from the original (PDF) on 13 August 2012.
- Majumdar, Boria; Bandyopadhyay, Kausik (2006). A Social History Of Indian Football: Striving To Score. Routledge. ISBN 9780415348355. Archived from the original on 29 June 2021.
- Basu, Jaydeep (2003). Stories from Indian Football. UBS Publishers' Distributors. ISBN 9788174764546. Archived from the original on 11 October 2022.
