= Sayed Khwaja Aziz-ud-Din =

Indian footballer (1930–1998)

Personal information
- Date of birth: 12 July 1930
- Place of birth: Gocha Mahal, British India (present-day Hyderabad, Telangana India)
- Date of death: June 1998
- Place of death: Chicago, Illinois, United States
- Height: 1.70 m (5 ft 7 in)
- Position: Defender

Senior career*
Years	Team	Apps	(Gls)
- Hyderabad City Police

International career
- India
Medal record
Men's football
Representing India
Asian Games
Gold medal – first place	1951 New Delhi	Team
- * Club domestic league appearances and goals

Sayed Khwaja Aziz-ud-Din (12 July 1930 – June 1998), known simply as S. K. Azizuddin, was an Indian footballer. He competed at the 1952 Summer Olympics and the 1956 Summer Olympics. He also captained the national team.

== Personal life ==
Born on 12 July 1930 in Gocha Mahal, during the British Raj, Aziz studied from the infant class to the sixth form at the Government High School, Gocha Mahal. His physical instructor Thakur Rao taught him the rudiments of the game and inspired him to improve his prowess in football.

== International career ==
Syed Khwaja Azizuddin, popularly known as Aziz, played either as full back or center half and was one of the versatile players in Indian football during the 1950s. He was a member of the India national football team that won gold medal at the inaugural 1951 Asian Games at Delhi. He later participated in 1953 Asian Quadrangular Football Tournament in Rangoon with Balaidas Chatterjee managed team, and won the title.

In the 1956 Summer Olympics at Melbourne, Australia, Aziz appeared with the national team that finished in fourth place, losing the bronze-medal match to Bulgaria 3–0. He was also captain of the national team, that emerged victories in the Quadrangular Tournament at Dhaka, Bangladesh, in 1955.

Aziz participated in the 1958 Asian Games in Tokyo, where they finished fourth, losing the bronze-medal match to Indonesia 4–1. The next year he traveled to Malaysia where they took part in the Merdeka Cup, and finished as the tournament runners-up.

In national team, Aziz's teammates under coach Syed Abdul Rahim were like: Ahmed Hussain, Peter Thangaraj, Nikhil Nandy, Samar Banerjee, P. K. Banerjee, Kesto Pal, Neville Stephen D'Souza, Tulsidas Balaram, Abdul Latif, Mariappa Kempiah, Chuni Goswami, Kannan, Mohammed Rahmatullah.

== Club career ==
He began his club career with National Sporting Club. From 1949 to 1960, he played for Hyderabad state team in the Santosh Trophy. They reached the finals four times, emerging winners in 1956–57 and 1957–58 and runners-up in 1949–50 and 1950–51. On both occasions that Hyderabad won the Santosh Trophy, Aziz played as skipper.

When he joined the famed Hyderabad City Police, he came under the able guidance of the famous late Syed Abdul Rahim, who improved his techniques and tactical knowledge of the game. In 1951, he represented India for the first time during a tour of the Far East and later helped the country win the gold medal in the Asian Games at Delhi. Since then he was a regular for India till 1959, including tours to Russia, Ceylon and the Far East and test matches at home against Russia, Austria and Pakistan.

Stockily built Aziz, though not very tall, had superb technique. With a powerful kick on either foot he was known for his deft passing. He was equally adept with either foot and was commanding in the air. He was never flustered and played with a cool head. His positional sense was impeccable and understanding with his colleagues was always of a high calibre. He set up counter attacks with accurate cross-field passes to either flank. Former national team manager Syed Nayeemuddin paid the late Aziz the ultimate tribute when he said, "Aziz was like a Brazilian defender, he had such superb skills. Even the great Junior would have looked junior at times to Aziz".

== Honours ==
Hyderabad City Police

- Durand Cup: 1950–51, 1954, 1957–58, 1961; runner-up: 1952, 1956–57
- Rovers Cup: 1950, 1951, 1952, 1953, 1954, 1957

India

- Asian Games Gold medal: 1951
- Asian Quadrangular Football Tournament: 1952, 1953, 1954, 1955
- Merdeka Tournament runner-up: 1959

Hyderabad

- Santosh Trophy: 1956–57, 1957–58

== Bibliography ==
- Kapadia, Novy (2017). Barefoot to Boots: The Many Lives of Indian Football. Penguin Random House. ISBN 978-0-143-42641-7.
- Martinez, Dolores; Mukharjiim, Projit B (2009). Football: From England to the World: The Many Lives of Indian Football. Routledge. ISBN 978-1-138-88353-6. Archived from the original on 2 July 2022.
- Nath, Nirmal (2011). History of Indian Football: Upto 2009–10. Readers Service. ISBN 9788187891963. Archived from the original on 22 July 2022.
- Dineo, Paul; Mills, James (2001). Soccer in South Asia: Empire, Nation, Diaspora. London, United Kingdom: Frank Cass Publishers. ISBN 978-0-7146-8170-2. Archived from the original on 25 July 2022.
- Majumdar, Boria; Bandyopadhyay, Kausik (2006). A Social History Of Indian Football: Striving To Score. Routledge. ISBN 9780415348355. Archived from the original on 29 June 2021.
- Basu, Jaydeep (2003). Stories from Indian Football. UBS Publishers' Distributors. ISBN 9788174764546. Archived from the original on 11 October 2022.
- "Triumphs and Disasters: The Story of Indian Football, 1889—2000" (PDF). Archived from the original (PDF) on 13 August 2012.
