= India national football team at the Olympics =

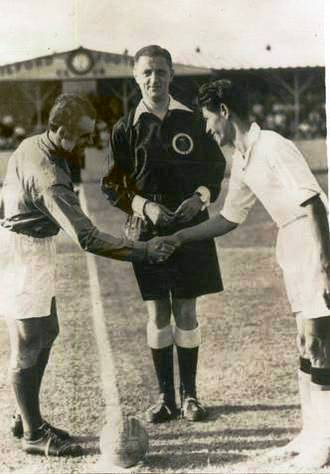
Indian captain Talimeren Ao (right) and French captain Gaby Robert (left) shaking hands before Swedish referee Gunnar Dahlner prior to the commencement of India's first Olympic match on 31 July 1948 against France.

Football was first introduced as an Olympic sports at the Summer Olympic Games held in France in 1900. It was played by only three club teams from three nations as an exhibition sport and played again at the 1904 Games. National sides played for the first time at the 1908 Summer Olympics. India did not send a football side to the Olympics until the 1948 Games; it participated in the next three Games. An Indian team last participated in the 1960 Games. India's best appearance was at the 1956 Summer Olympics where its team reached the semi-finals. Beginning with the 1992 Summer Olympics, the rules were changed so that only under-23 national teams are allowed to compete in the Games. India's U-23 national team has yet to qualify for the Olympic football competition.

== History ==
=== 1948 Olympics: first participation ===
==== Warm-up ====
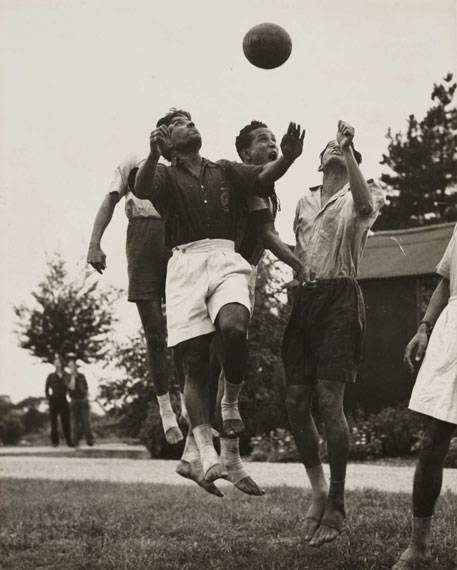
As dry weather, Indians were practising barefooted at Richmond Park, London

In 1948, London hosted the 1948 Summer Olympic Games. The Indian football team made its first Olympic appearance in a match against France. This was the first match played by a team from the newly independent India. Coach Balaidas Chatterjee had prepared the team which successfully defeated Department Store XI 15–0 on 13 July, and the Metropolitan Police F.C. 3–1 on 16 July. The team then went on to defeat the Pinner F.C. by 9–1 on 24 July, Hayes F.C. by 4–1 on 26 July, and Alexandra Park FC by 8–2 on 28 July.

Most of the Indian players were not accustomed to wearing boots and some having dislike of being shod. However, during trials in India, the players wore boots as the pitch was wet due to heavy rain. Thus during the Games, the Indian team decided to wear shoes if the conditions were wet and if they had to play on soft grounds. As conditions were dry, most players opted to play without shoes and instead wore bandages to protect their feet. Of the eleven players who took the field against France eight players were barefooted, three wore boots.

==== The match ====
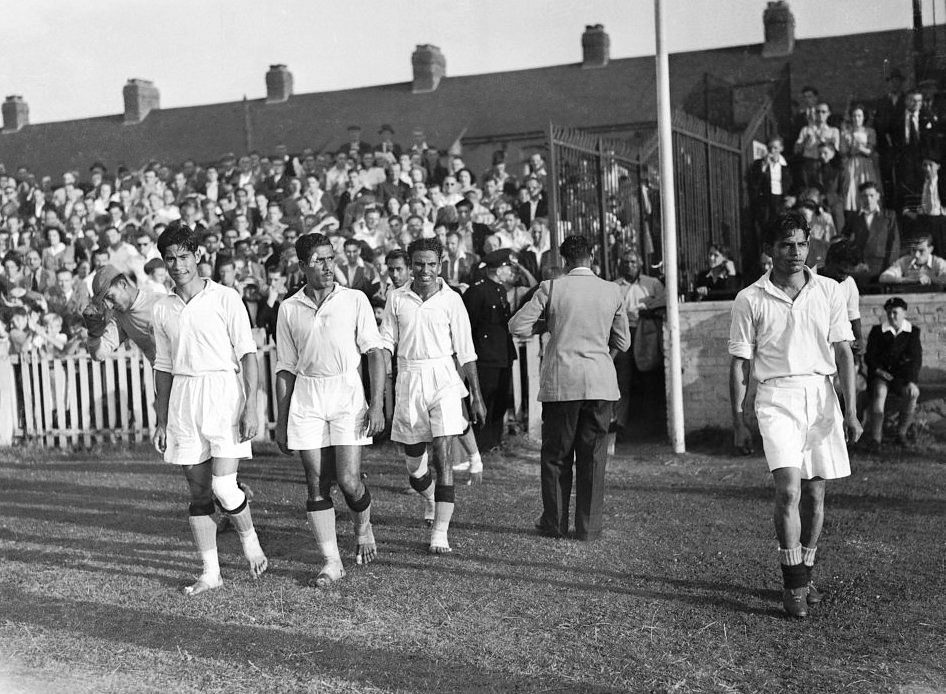
Talimeren Ao on the left, leading the Indian team to Cricklefield Stadium to play against France.

On 31 July 1948, the first eleven men in independent India's footballing history walked to the middle of Cricklefield Stadium in front of 17,000 spectators wearing thick socks cut off at the ankles and bare feet strapped up to protect them and to provide grip. Taj Mohammed, K. P. Dhanraj, Thenmadom Varghese wore boots. For the first 29 minutes neither team dominated proceedings, then in the 30th minute René Courbin gave France a 1–0 lead. Just before half-time, Swedish referee Gunnar Dahlner awarded India a penalty kick; Sailen Manna missed it as the ball flew over the crossbar. In the second half Ahmed Khan created an opening, he combined with substitute Balasundra Vajravelu, beat the French defense, and passed the ball to Sarangapani Raman who scored the equaliser in the 70th minute. His name was recorded as independent India's first international goal scorer. Ten minutes after Raman's equaliser, India had a chance to take the lead through another penalty. This time Mahabir Prasad's shot at the goal was saved by the French goalkeeper Guy Rouxel. With one minute to go before the final whistle René Persillon scored to give France a 2–1 victory and a place in the quarterfinals.

==== Media and appreciation ====
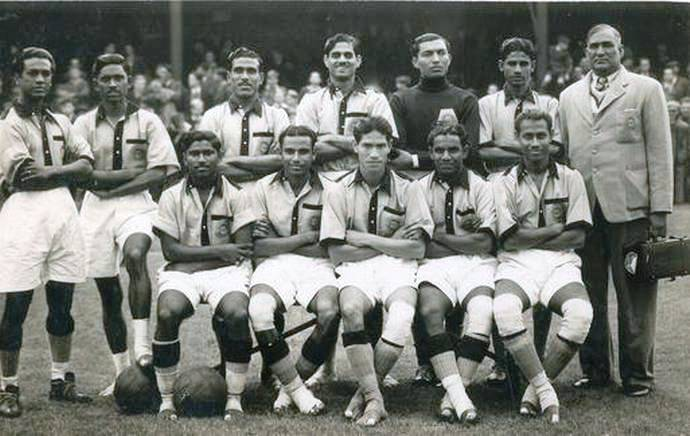
Indian team at 1948 Olympics, Talimeren Ao at the centre of first row, goalscorer Sarangapani Raman next to Ao and coach Balaidas Chatterjee to the extreme right.

The Indian team was acknowledged and appreciated by the crowd for their good sportsmanship. "The French had been given a run for their money – and that, too, by the barefooted Indians!", the British media reported. At a press conference, shortly after the match, the Indians were asked why they played barefooted. The Indian captain Talimeren Ao said, "Well, you see, we play football in India, whereas you play BOOTBALL!". This was applauded by the British and the next day Ao's comment was in the headlines of London's newspapers.

While the 1–2 loss to France and first round elimination was a huge disappointment to the team and the public alike, the quality of football the team displayed had captivated one and all. The Indian footballers' bravery and brilliance in bare feet at the 1948 Olympics earned them the admiration of Princess Margaret, the younger sister of Queen Elizabeth II. King George VI invited the team to Buckingham Palace and there, as the story goes, he lifted up Sailen Manna's trouser leg, telling him it was just to check if he really had legs of steel as it appeared from the strength of his shots. Encouraged by the accolades and the positive reception to India's football, the All India Football Federation (AIFF) decided to extend the tour with some friendlies across Europe over the next several weeks that enhanced the team's reputation at the time.

=== 1952, 1956, and 1960 Olympics ===
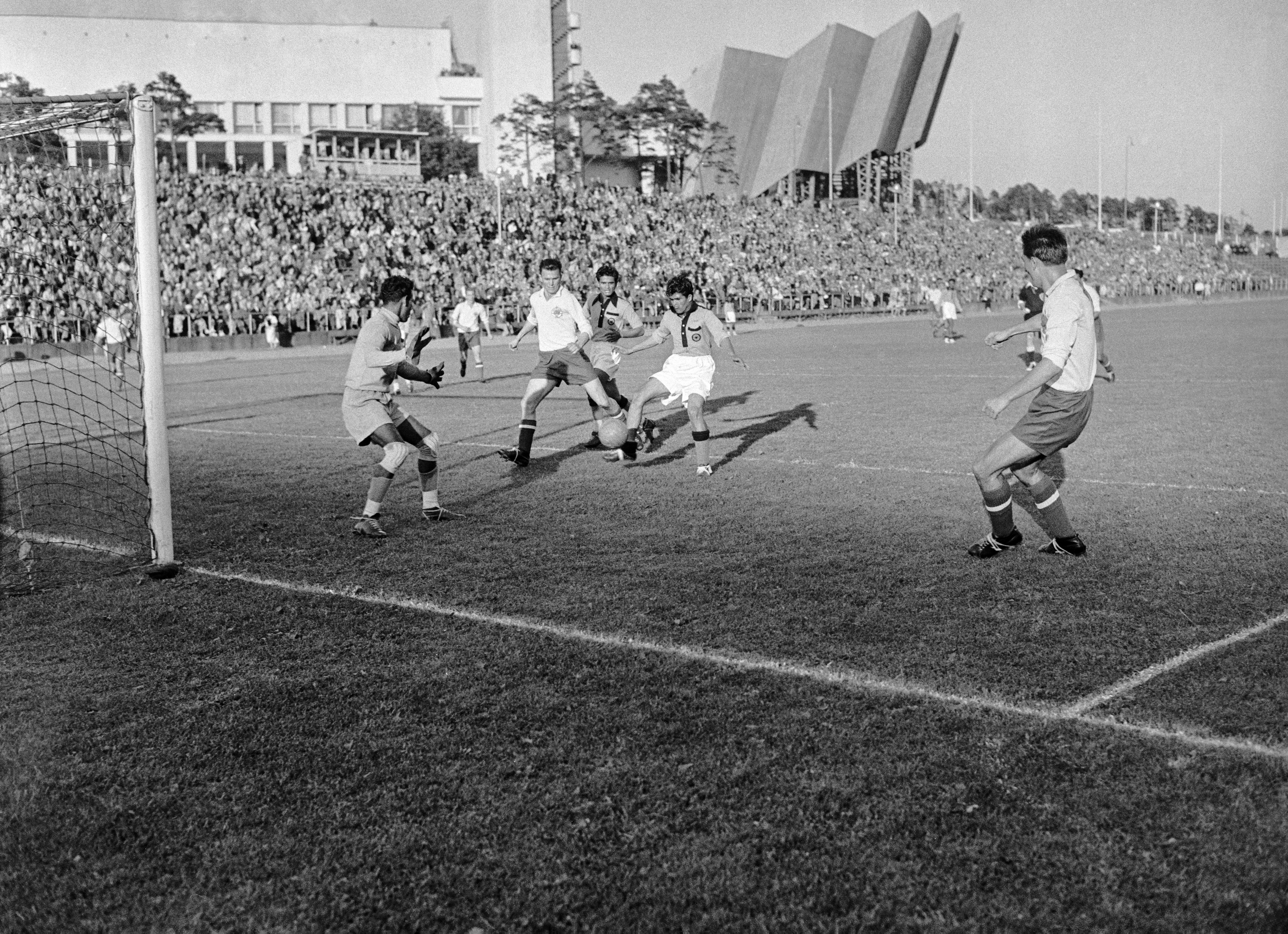
Yugoslavia scoring against India at Töölön Pallokenttä, Helsinki in 1952 Olympics

In 1952, under Sailen Manna's leadership at Helsinki, India would again lose in the first round, this time 10–1 to Yugoslavia. The Yugoslavian Branko Zebec scored four of the ten goals for his side; the lone goal for the Indian side was scored by Ahmed Khan in the 89th minute as the final goal of the match.

Four years later, at the 1956 Olympics in Melbourne, India attained its best outing at the Games as they reached the semi-finals of the tournament. The team was led by Samar Banerjee and India's most successful coach Syed Abdul Rahim, who coached the team at both the 1952 and 1960 Olympics. India reached the first round without playing a scheduled preliminary match. The team received a walkover because Hungary did not play.

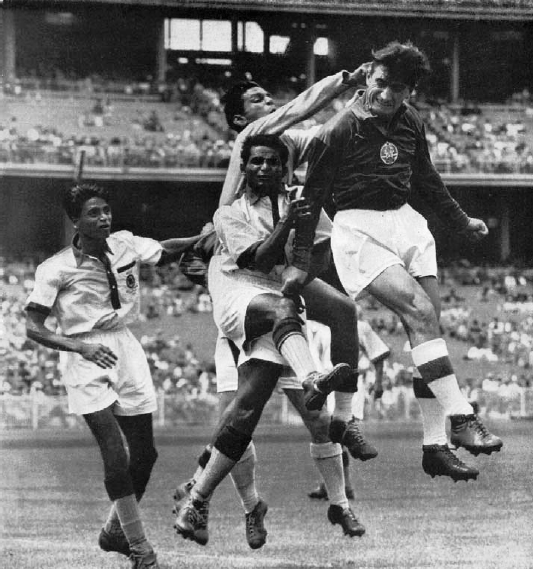
Indian team at a tussle against Bulgaria at the 1956 Olympics.

The team beat hosts Australia 4–2 and reached the semi-finals becoming the first Asian team to do so in Olympic history. At the match against Australia Neville D'Souza scored a hat trick. He scored two goals in the first half at the ninth and 33rd minutes. The first was a nod to the rebound from captain Samar Banerjee's shot to the opponent's post. Then in the 33rd minute D'Souza converted a cross from P. K. Banerjee who sent the ball into the net from the right flank. A third goal was scored in the second half at the 50th minute when Banerjee converted a free ball received from a melee between Indian striker Muhammad Kannayan and Australian goalkeeper Ron Lord. The fourth Indian goal was scored by J. Krishnaswamy at the 80th minute. Bruce Morrow scored two goals for the hosts.

However, India failed to reach the final losing to Yugoslavia by 4–1 in the semi-finals. There were no goals scored in the first half. D'Souza scored the opening goal in the match for India at the 52nd minute, but in the next 15 minutes Yugoslavia scored three goals at the 54th, 57th and 65th minutes. A mistake by Indian defender Muhammad Salaam led to an own goal at the 78th minute ensuring Yugoslavia's victory in the match. After the loss, India faced Bulgaria in the bronze medal match where they were again defeated by a score of 3–0. With four goals Neville D'Souza became joint top scorer in that edition of the Games with Todor Veselinović of Yugoslavia and Dimitar Stoyanov of Bulgaria.

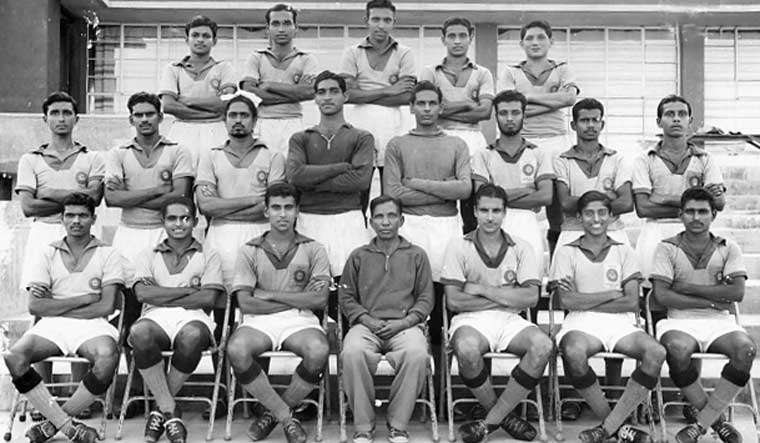
Indian team at the 1960 Olympics, Coach Syed Abdul Rahim at the front row centre and captain P. K. Banerjee on his right side.

At 1960 Olympics in Rome, India was placed in a group with strong sides from Hungary, France and Peru. The team was led by P. K. Banerjee under the coaching of Syed Abdul Rahim. Tulsidas Balaram scored two goals, one each in the matches against Hungary and Peru, both of which India lost. In the second match Banerjee's goal in the 71st minute would help India hold France to a draw. With two losses and a draw, India placed at the bottom of the group and failed to move to the next round. This was the last time India qualified for the Olympics in football.

=== 1964–present ===
From 1908 to 1988, football at the Olympics was played by senior national teams. Between these years the India national football team competed at Games from 1948 to 1960. From 1992, FIFA allowed only U-23 national teams to play in the tournament at the Olympics. India withdrew from qualifying competition in the 1968, 1976 and 1988 Olympics. For the 1964, 1972, 1980 and 1984 Olympics India failed to qualify.

Though U-23 players were allowed, every qualifying matches from 1992 Olympics to the 2012 Olympics were played by India's senior national team. It failed to qualify for the Olympic finals from 1992 to 2012. The Asian Football Confederation (AFC) started the AFC U-23 Championship in 2013 which now acts as the qualifying tournament for the Olympics for Asian countries. The top three teams are allowed entry to the Olympic finals. India has yet to qualify for the AFC U-23 Championship and thus for the Olympics since then.

== Record ==
India has played eight football matches at the Olympic Games, and managed one win, one draw, and lost in six of them. India scored ten goals in seven matches against five different teams and conceded twenty-seven goals in eight matches against six different teams. In 1948 and 1952, India was automatically qualified to play in the final tournament and for the 1956 Olympics, India was scheduled to play against Thailand in the qualification round, but both the teams got a bye as the Republic of China and the Philippines teams withdrew from the qualification round.

For the 1960 Olympics, India was scheduled to play the first round of the qualification against Afghanistan. In the two-legged tie India won the away leg by 2−5 and in the home leg Afghanistan withdrew before the match. Eventually India moved to the second round where they defeated Indonesia in both legs and qualified for the Olympics. 1960 Olympics would be India's last participation till date. From 1964 to 2012 India failed to qualify for the Olympics. From 2016 onwards the AFC U-23 Championship (AFC U-23 Asian Cup since 2022) (Note: In October 2020, the AFC rebranded all its age group championships to AFC Asian Cups. The AFC U-23 Championship is now known as the AFC U-23 Asian Cup.) was considered to be the qualification tournament for the Asian teams, which India failed to progress from.

Summer Olympics record										Summer Olympics qualification record					
Host/Year	Result	Position	Pld	W	T	L	GF	GA	Squad	Pld	W	T	L	GF	GA
(United Kingdom) 1908 to (Germany) 1936	did not enter									did not enter					
(United Kingdom) 1948	Round 1	11th	1	0	0	1	1	2	Squad	Qualified automatically					
(Finland) 1952	Preliminaries	25th	1	0	0	1	1	10	Squad	Qualified automatically					
(Australia) 1956	Semi-finals	4th	3	1	0	2	5	9	Squad	Bye					
(Italy) 1960	Round 1	13th	3	0	1	2	3	6	Squad	3	3	0	0	11	4
(Japan) 1964	did not qualify									4	2	0	2	13	9
(Mexico) 1968	did not qualify									Withdrew					
(West Germany) 1972	did not qualify									3	0	0	3	5	9
(Canada) 1976	did not qualify									Withdrew					
(Soviet Union) 1980	did not qualify									5	1	0	4	5	6
(United States) 1984	did not qualify									8	3	1	4	11	14
(South Korea) 1988	did not qualify									Withdrew					
FIFA allowed under-23 national teams onward (India national U-23 team) (Note: Till the 1980 Games amateur players were eligible to play the Olympic football tournaments. Professional footballers were allowed for the first time at the 1984 Games by the International Olympic Committee (IOC), with a condition that they didn't participate in a FIFA World Cup before. Thus, most of the countries fielded young professional players for the 1984 and the 1988 Games. This led to a new regulation agreed upon by the IOC and the FIFA, that under-23 players would participate from the 1992 Games onwards.)
(Spain) 1992	did not qualify									4	0	1	3	3	7
(United States) 1996	did not qualify									4	2	0	2	8	7
(Australia) 2000	did not qualify									2	0	1	1	0	2
(Greece) 2004	did not qualify									2	1	0	1	1	2
(China) 2008	did not qualify									8	0	3	5	3	13
(United Kingdom) 2012	did not qualify									4	1	2	1	5	6
Since 2016, AFC U-23 Asian Cup acted as the AFC qualifier (top 3 finishers)
(Brazil) 2016	did not qualify									did not qualify 2016 AFC U-23					
(Japan) 2020	did not qualify									did not qualify 2020 AFC U-23					
(France) 2024	did not qualify									did not qualify 2024 AFC U-23					
(United States) 2028	To be determined									To be determined					
(Australia) 2032	To be determined									To be determined					
Total	Semi-finals	4 / 26	8	1	1	6	10	27	—	47	13	8	26	65	79

== Match summary ==
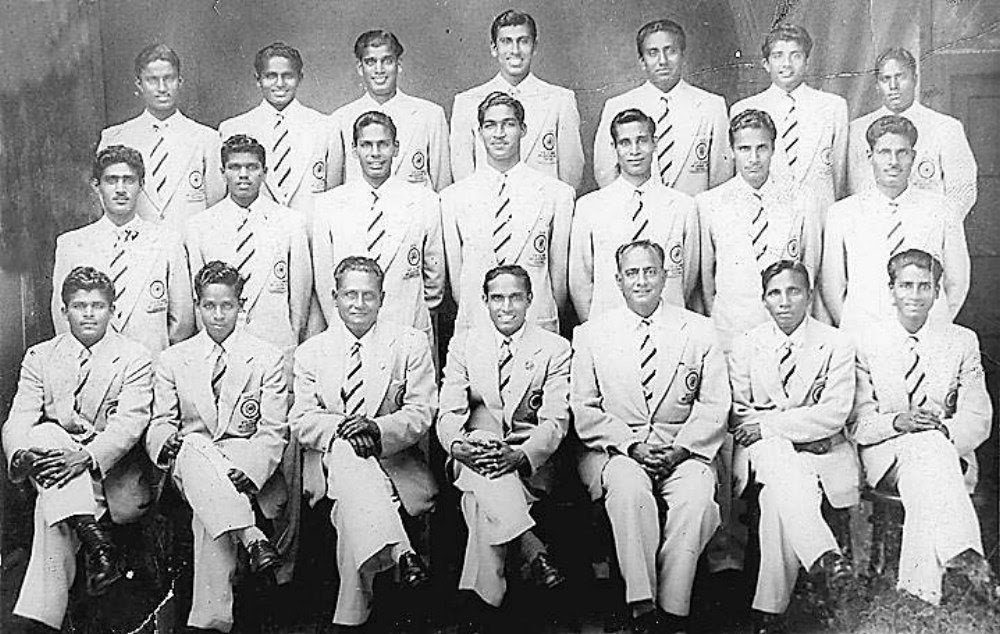
Men's Indian football team, 1956 Olympics.

India has scored the most goals against Australia in a 4–2 victory at the 1956 Olympics, their biggest win in the Olympic history. The most goals the team conceded were in a 1–10 loss against Yugoslavia at the 1952 Olympics, their largest defeat to date.

Summer Olympics History
Year	Round	Score	Result	Ref.
1948	Round 1	India 1–2 France	Loss	
1952	Prelim match	India 1–10 Yugoslavia	Loss	
1956	Round 1	India w/o Hungary	†	
1956	Quarter-final	India 4–2 Australia	Win	
1956	Semi-final	India 1–4 Yugoslavia	Loss	
1956	(bronze) medal match	India 0–3 Bulgaria	Loss	
1960	Group match	India 1–2 Hungary	Loss	
1960	Group match	India 1–1 France	Draw	
1960	Group match	India 1–3 Peru	Loss	

† At 1956 Olympics, India got a walkover as Hungary withdrew from the match due to Hungarian Revolution, thus India proceeded to QF without playing any match in the first round.

== Goalscorers ==
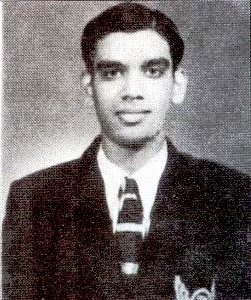
Neville D'Souza, first ever Indian and Asian hat-trick scorer at the Olympics

No.	Player	Venue	Opponent	Date	Edition	Goals	Ref.
1	Sarangapani Raman	Criclefield Stadium, Ilford, London	France	31 July 1948	1948	1	
2	Ahmed Khan	Töölön Pallokenttä, Helsinki	Yugoslavia	15 July 1952	1952	1	
3	Neville D'Souza	Olympic Park Stadium, Melbourne	Australia	1 December 1956	1956	3	
3	Neville D'Souza	Olympic Park Stadium, Melbourne	Yugoslavia	4 December 1956	1956	1	
4	J. Krishnaswamy	Olympic Park Stadium, Melbourne	Australia	1 December 1956	1956	1	
5	Tulsidas Balaram	Stadio Tommaso Fattori, L'Aquila	Hungary	26 August 1960	1960	1	
5	Tulsidas Balaram	Stadio Adriatico, Pescara	Peru	1 September 1960	1960	1	
6	P. K. Banerjee	Stadio Olimpico, Grosseto	France	29 August 1960	1960	1	

== Coach, captain, and goalkeeper ==
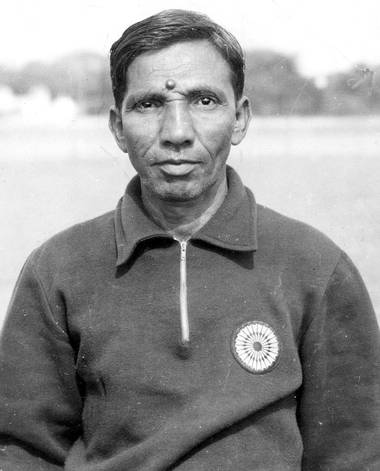
Syed Abdul Rahim coached India in the 1952, 1956 and 1960 Olympics.

Edition	Coach	Captain	Goalkeeper	Matches played	Ref.
1948 London Olympics	Balaidas Chatterjee	Talimeren Ao	Kenchappa Varadaraj	1	
1952 Helsinki Olympics	Syed Abdul Rahim	Sailen Manna	Berland Anthony	1	
1956 Melbourne Olympics	Syed Abdul Rahim	Samar Banerjee	Peter Thangaraj	1	
1956 Melbourne Olympics	Syed Abdul Rahim	Samar Banerjee	S. S. Narayan	2 ‡	
1960 Rome Olympics	Syed Abdul Rahim	P. K. Banerjee	Peter Thangaraj	3	

‡ S. S. Narayan was the goalkeeper for the team against Yugoslavia and Bulgaria and Peter Thangaraj kept the net for the quarter-final match against Australia at 1956 Olympics.

== See also ==
- History of the India national football team
- Football at the Summer Olympics
- India at the FIFA World Cup qualification
- Football at the Asian Games
- India national football team at the Asian Games
- India at the AFC Asian Cup
- AFC U-23 Championship
- India national under-23 football team
