= Mohammed Rahmatullah =

Indian footballer (1938–2025)

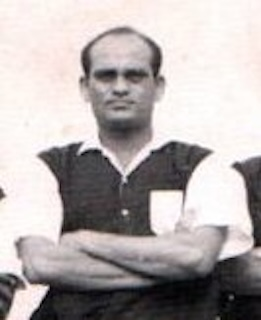
- Rahmatullah with Dhaka Mohammedan in 1963

Personal information
- Date of birth: 1938
- Place of birth: Hyderabad, Hyderabad State, India
- Date of death: 3 December 2025 (aged 87)
- Place of death: Los Angeles, California, U.S.
- Position: Forward

Senior career*
Years	Team	Apps	(Gls)
1952–1962	Kolkata Mohammedan		
1963–1964	Dhaka Mohammedan		
1965–1966	Dhaka Wanderers		

International career
1958–1961	India	22	(8)

Managerial career
- 1963–1967: EPIDC
- 1969: Pakistan (caretaker)
- 1969–1970: EPIDC
- 1974: Pakistan
- * Club domestic league appearances and goals

Mohammad Rahmatullah (1938 – 3 December 2025) was an Indian footballer who played as a forward, and manager.

Rahmatullah played for the India national team and spent most of his career with Calcutta Football League giant Mohammedan Sporting. He later appeared with Bangladeshi outfit Dhaka Mohammedan and became one of the earliest Indians in post-independence period to take the international transfer, while another was legendary Mohammed Salim, who played for Celtic.

As manager, Rahmatullah coached EPIDC in the Dhaka First Division League, leading the club to the league title in both 1967 and 1970. He also managed the Pakistan national team at the 1969 RCD Cup, 1974 RCD Cup and the 1974 Asian Games.

== Club career ==
=== Kolkata Mohammedan ===
Rahmatullah moved to Calcutta Football League giant Mohammedan Sporting during the first half of the 1950s and won the league in 1957. With Mohammedan, he won the IFA Shield in that year, and won Rovers Cup thrice in 1955, 1957 and 1958.

Rahmatullah was instrumental in winning the Aga Khan Gold Cup in Bangladesh, in 1960, the first ever tournament win by an Indian club in foreign soil. They defeated Indonesia's Persatuan Sepakbola Makassar 4–1 in the final, in which he scored a goal.

=== Dhaka Mohammedan ===
In 1963, he moved to Dhaka Mohammedan and became the second Indian to play for an overseas club. He appeared in Dhaka First Division League during his days in Bangladesh. He eventually became an honorary member of the club.

=== Dhaka Wanderers ===
Rahmatullah represented Dhaka Wanderers Club in the Dhaka First Division League in both 1965 and 1966, during the final years of his playing career.

=== Bengal ===
Rahmatullah also represented Balaidas Chatterjee managed Bengal football team at the Santosh Trophy and won the tournament four times in 1953–54, 1955–56, 1958–59 and 1959–60 seasons.

== International career ==
Rahmatullah made his senior international debut for India against Burma on 26 May 1958 in the 1958 Asian Games, that ended up a 3–2 win in favour of them. He scored his first international goal against Indonesia on 28 May in the same tournament. In the quarterfinal, India defeated Hong Kong 5–2, with two goals by Rahmatullah, and one each by the trio of Chuni Goswami, Tulsidas Balaram and D. Damodaran. They finished on fourth position as they lost 1–4 to Indonesia in the bronze media match at Japan National Stadium.

The next year he travelled to Malaysia where India took part in the Merdeka Cup and finished as runners-up. He was in the squad, as India began the 1960s with the 1960 AFC Asian Cup qualifiers. Despite the qualifiers for the West Zone being held in Kochi, India finished last in their qualification group and thus missed out on the tournament.

In national team, Rahmatullah's teammates under coach Syed Abdul Rahim, were: Ahmed Hussain, Peter Thangaraj, Nikhil Nandy, Samar Banerjee, P. K. Banerjee, Kesto Pal, Neville Stephen D'Souza, Tulsidas Balaram, Sayed Khwaja Aziz-ud-Din, Abdul Latif, Mariappa Kempiah, Chuni Goswami, Kannan. Between 1958 and 1961, he appeared in twenty-two international matches for India, scoring eight goals.

== Coaching career ==
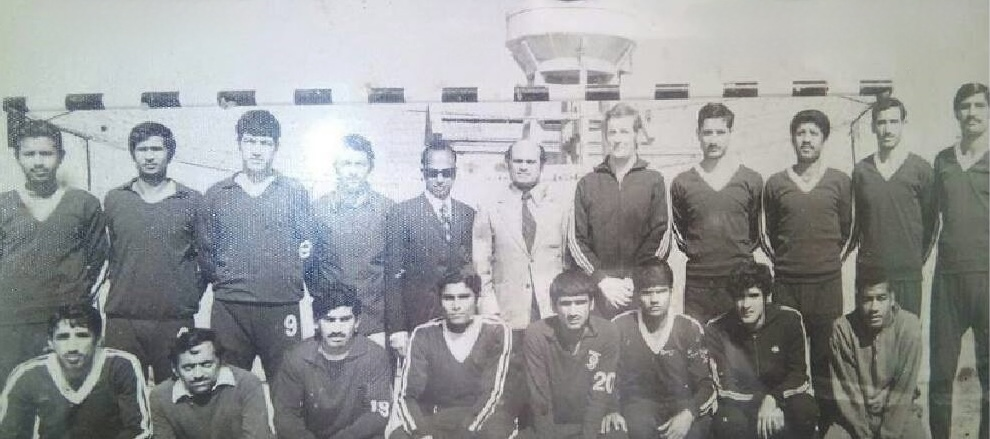
Rahmatullah standing sixth from left with Pakistan at the 1974 RCD Cup

Rahmatullah joined EPIDC in 1963 as a sports welfare officer-cum-coach. He helped the club enter the Dhaka First Division League in 1966 following consecutive promotions. He led the club to the league title in both 1967 and 1970.

In 1969, Rahmatullah acted as caretaker head coach of the Pakistan national team at the 1969 RCD Cup in place of national team official coach Mohammad Amin. Five years later, he again took the head coach role of the Pakistan national team for the 1974 RCD Cup, and later the 1974 Asian Games.

== Personal life and death ==
In May 1969, Rahmatullah's older brother, Mohammed Azmatullah, died in Hyderabad, Deccan.

On 12 March 2014, Rahmatullah was admitted to a hospital in California for an open heart surgery.

Rahmatullah died in Los Angeles on 3 December 2025, at the age of 87.

== Honours ==
Mohammedan Sporting (Kolkata)

- Calcutta Football League: 1957
- IFA Shield: 1957
- Aga Khan Gold Cup: 1960
- Rovers Cup: 1955, 1957, 1958
- Coochbehar Cup: 1952
- Durand Cup: runner-up 1959

Mohammedan Sporting (Dhaka)

- Dhaka Football League: 1963

Bengal

- Santosh Trophy: 1953–54, 1955–56, 1958–59, 1959–60

India

- Merdeka Tournament runner-up: 1959

== See also ==
- List of Indian football players in foreign leagues

== Bibliography ==
- Kapadia, Novy (2017). Barefoot to Boots: The Many Lives of Indian Football. Penguin Random House. ISBN 978-0-143-42641-7.
- Martinez, Dolores; Mukharjiim, Projit B (2009). Football: From England to the World: The Many Lives of Indian Football. Routledge. ISBN 978-1-138-88353-6. Archived from the original on 2 July 2022.
- Nath, Nirmal (2011). History of Indian Football: Upto 2009–10. Readers Service. ISBN 978-81-87891-96-3. Archived from the original on 22 July 2022.
- Dineo, Paul; Mills, James (2001). Soccer in South Asia: Empire, Nation, Diaspora. London, United Kingdom: Frank Cass Publishers. ISBN 978-0-7146-8170-2. Archived from the original on 25 July 2022.
- "Triumphs and Disasters: The Story of Indian Football, 1889—2000" (PDF). Archived from the original (PDF) on 13 August 2012.
- Majumdar, Boria; Bandyopadhyay, Kausik (2006). A Social History Of Indian Football: Striving To Score. Routledge. ISBN 978-0-415-34835-5. Archived from the original on 29 June 2021.
- Basu, Jaydeep (2003). Stories from Indian Football. UBS Publishers' Distributors. ISBN 978-81-7476-454-6. Archived from the original on 11 October 2022.
