= Dharmalingam Kannan =

Indian footballer

Personal information
- Date of birth: 8 July 1936
- Place of birth: Secunderabad, British India
- Date of death: 19 May 2006 (aged 69)
- Place of death: Hyderabad, India
- Position: Centre forward

Senior career*
Years	Team	Apps	(Gls)
- Hyderabad
- East Bengal

International career
- India
- * Club domestic league appearances and goals

Dharmalingam Kannan (8 July 1936 – 19 May 2006) was an Indian footballer. He competed in the men's tournament at the 1960 Summer Olympics.

Kannan played for Hyderabad from 1956 to 1958 and Bengal from 1959. He represented India in the 1958 Asian Games. He was employed with the Vehicle Depot, Secunderabad but moved to East Bengal.

== Personal life ==
Kannan was born into a Tamil dalit family from Ammuguda.

== Honours ==
East Bengal

- Calcutta Football League: 1961
- Durand Cup: 1960
- IFA Shield: 1961
- DCM Trophy: 1960

India

- Merdeka Tournament runner-up: 1959

Hyderabad

- Santosh Trophy: 1956-57

Bengal

- Santosh Trophy: 1958-59

== Bibliography ==
- Kapadia, Novy (2017). Barefoot to Boots: The Many Lives of Indian Football. Penguin Random House. ISBN 978-0-143-42641-7.
- Martinez, Dolores; Mukharjiim, Projit B (2009). Football: From England to the World: The Many Lives of Indian Football. Routledge. ISBN 978-1-138-88353-6. Archived from the original on 2 July 2022.
- Nath, Nirmal (2011). History of Indian Football: Upto 2009–10. Readers Service. ISBN 9788187891963. Archived from the original on 22 July 2022.
- Dineo, Paul; Mills, James (2001). Soccer in South Asia: Empire, Nation, Diaspora. London, United Kingdom: Frank Cass Publishers. ISBN 978-0-7146-8170-2. Archived from the original on 25 July 2022.
