= Mohammed Zulfiqaruddin =

Indian footballer (1936–2019)

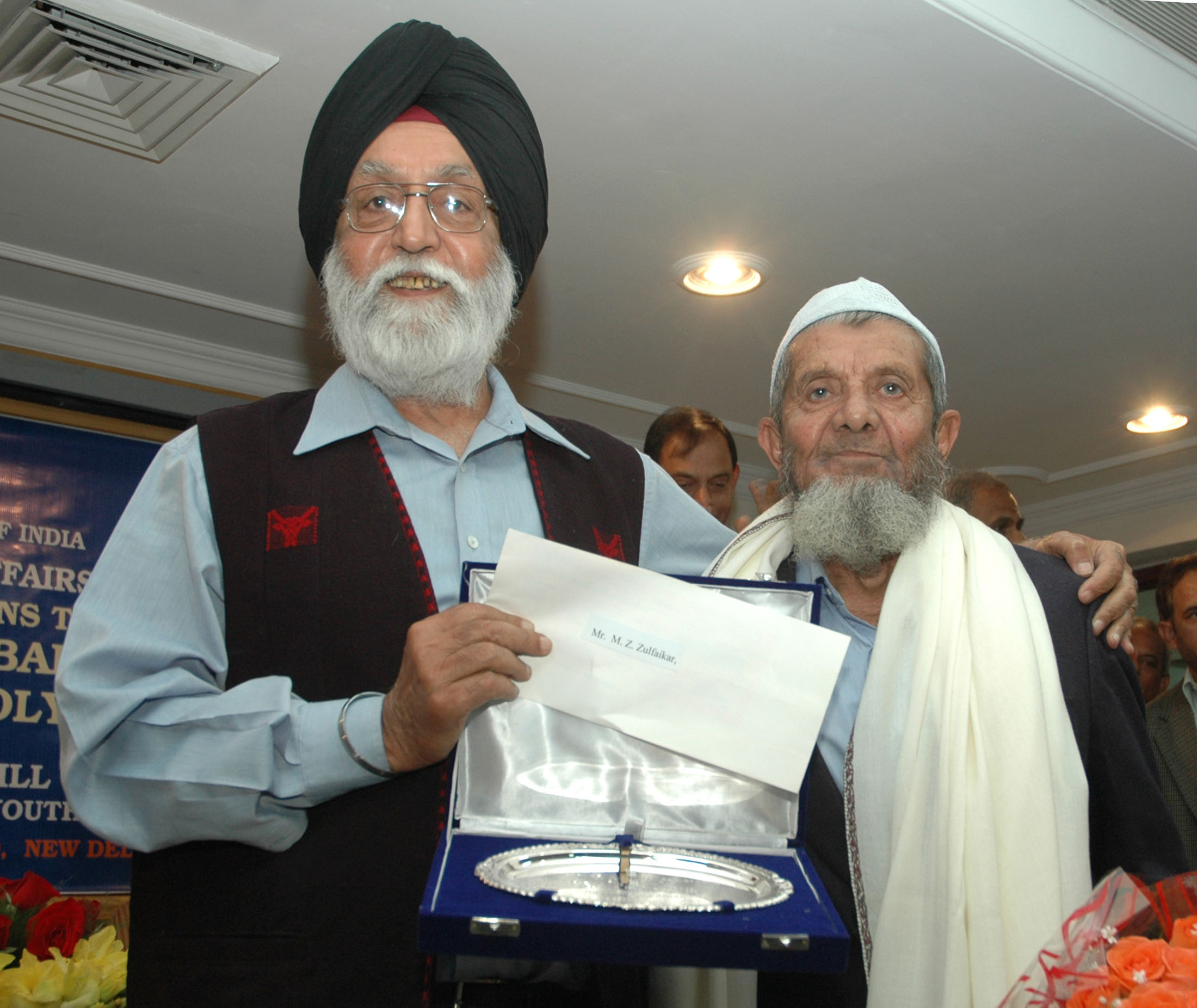
- Zulfiqaruddin being felicitated by Indian sports minister M. S. Gill, in New Delhi, February 23, 2009.

Personal information
- Date of birth: 1936
- Date of death: 13 January 2019 (aged 82–83)
- Place of death: Hyderabad, Telangana, India
- Position: Forward

Senior career*
Years	Team	Apps	(Gls)
- Hyderabad City Police
- Hyderabad

International career
- India
- * Club domestic league appearances and goals

Mohammed Zulfiqaruddin was an Indian association football player who played for the India national football team. He was part of the Indian team that reached the Semi-final of 1956 Summer Olympics.

== Playing career ==
Zulfiqaruddin began his club football with Hyderabad City Police FC, one of the strongest sides in Indian football.

He represented India at the 1958 Asian Games. He captained the Andhra Pradesh team in Santosh Trophy from 1955 to 1967, and also captained the Andhra Police team in nationwide competitions such as the IFA Shield, Durand Cup and Rovers Cup. After outstanding performance with Hyderabad at the 1956–57 Santosh Trophy and winning the title defeating Bombay 4–1 in final, he along with Tulsidas Balaram were called up to the India national team. He died at the age of 83 in 2019. During his international duties, Zulfiqaruddin was managed and highly influenced by legendary Indian coach Syed Abdul Rahim.

He spoke about Rahim as, "He was a master at work. He made the Indian football team a formidable unit. He had the uncanny ability of spotting talent and turning them into solid players. But he was a strict disciplinarian."

== Honours ==
India

- Merdeka Tournament runner-up: 1959

Hyderabad / Andhra Pradesh

- Santosh Trophy: 1956–57, 1957–58, 1965–66

Hyderabad City Police / Andhra Pradesh Police

- Durand Cup: 1957–58, 1961
- Rovers Cup: 1957, 1960, 1962, 1963–64
- DCM Trophy: 1959

== Bibliography ==
- Kapadia, Novy (2017). Barefoot to Boots: The Many Lives of Indian Football. Penguin Random House. ISBN 978-0-143-42641-7.
- Martinez, Dolores; Mukharjiim, Projit B (2009). Football: From England to the World: The Many Lives of Indian Football. Routledge. ISBN 978-1-138-88353-6. Archived from the original on 2 July 2022.
- Nath, Nirmal (2011). History of Indian Football: Upto 2009–10. Readers Service. ISBN 9788187891963. Archived from the original on 22 July 2022.
- Dineo, Paul; Mills, James (2001). Soccer in South Asia: Empire, Nation, Diaspora. London, United Kingdom: Frank Cass Publishers. ISBN 978-0-7146-8170-2. Archived from the original on 25 July 2022.
- "Triumphs and Disasters: The Story of Indian Football, 1889—2000" (PDF). Archived from the original (PDF) on 13 August 2012.
- Majumdar, Boria; Bandyopadhyay, Kausik (2006). A Social History Of Indian Football: Striving To Score. Routledge. ISBN 9780415348355. Archived from the original on 29 June 2021.
- Basu, Jaydeep (2003). Stories from Indian Football. UBS Publishers' Distributors. ISBN 9788174764546. Archived from the original on 11 October 2022.
