= Windsor John =

Malaysian football administrator (born 1961)

Yang Berbahagia Datuk Seri Windsor Paul John SMW DIMP AMP

General Secretary of AFC

Personal details
- Born: Windsor Paul John; 1961 (age 64–65) Kedah, Federation of Malaya (now Malaysia)
- Occupation: Football administrator

Datuk Seri Windsor Paul John (born 1961) is a Malaysian football administrator.

In 2015, he was appointed as the Asian Football Confederation's Secretary General. He replaced Alex Soosay, the former Secretary General who had been suspended by the AFC.
