= University Stadium (Thiruvananthapuram) =

Sports Stadium in Trivandrum City

Coordinates: 8.507856°N 76.951203°E

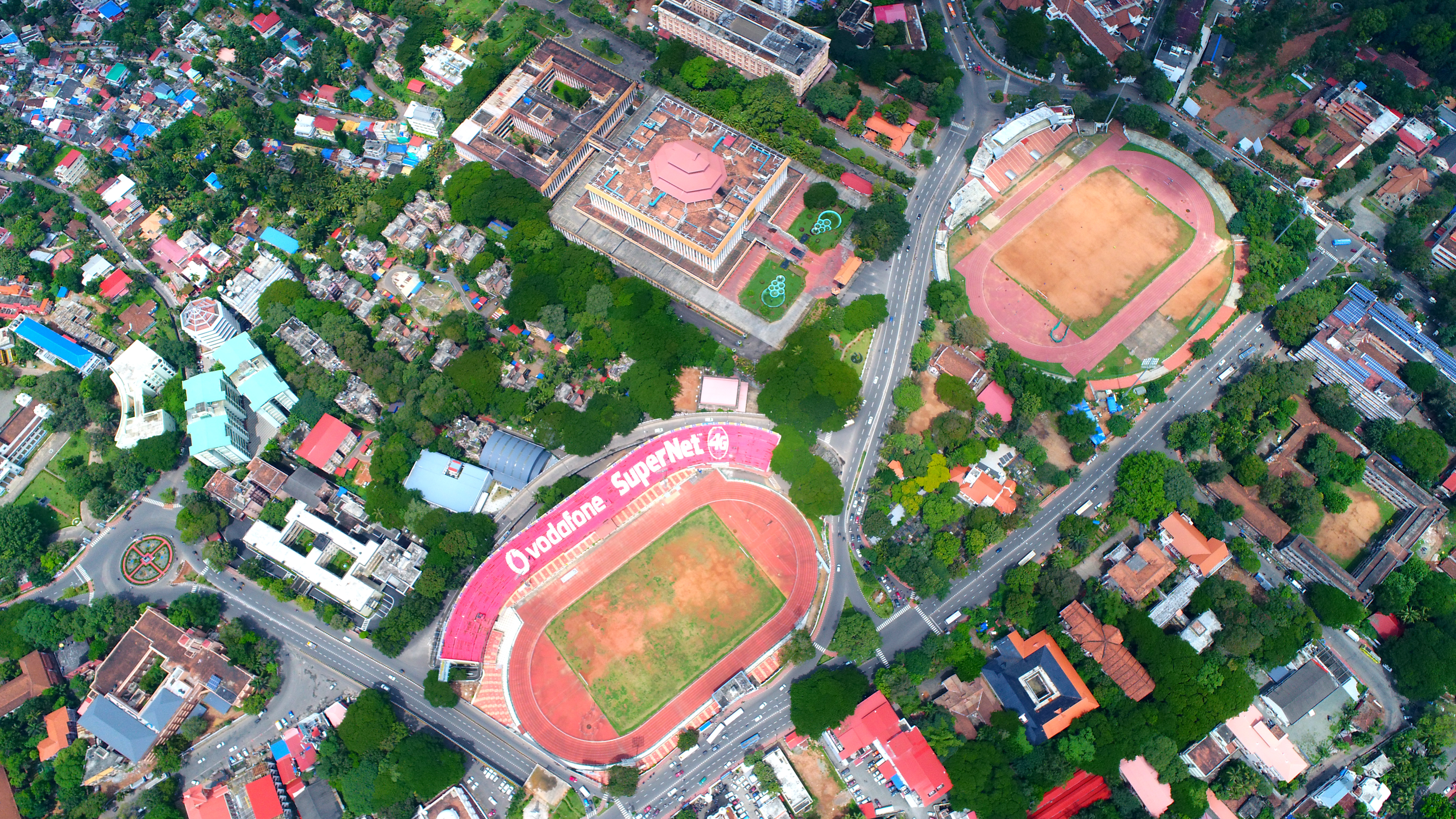
- A view of University Stadium (right) and CSN Stadium (left)
- Interactive map of University Stadium

Ground information
- Location: Thiruvananthapuram, Kerala, India
- Establishment: 1940; 86 years ago
- Capacity: 20,000
- Owner: University of Kerala, Trivandrum
- End names
- Church End; Hotel End

International information
- First men's ODI: 1 October 1984; 42 years ago: India v Australia
- Last men's ODI: 25 January 1988; 38 years ago: India v West Indies
- As of 18 January 2019; 7 years ago Source: University Stadium, Cricinfo

University Stadium or Kerala University Stadium is a multi-purpose stadium located in the city of Thiruvananthapuram, Kerala. The stadium is used predominantly for football and athletics. It also hosted cricket matches.

The stadium is owned by the University of Kerala and was opened in 1940. The stadium has a capacity of 20,000. It was used as the home ground of Kerala cricket team till the late 1980s. The stadium has hosted 2 ODI matches with the host India losing one match, and the other yielded no result.

The stadium was the home ground of Chirag United Club for their I-League season.

== One Day International cricket ==
The stadium has hosted following ODI matches till date.

Team (A)	Team (B)	Winner	Margin	Year	Scorecard
India	Australia	No result		1984	2nd ODI, Australia tour of India
India	West Indies	West Indies	9 wickets	1988	7th ODI, West Indies tour of India

== List of centuries ==
=== Key ===
- * denotes that the batsman was not out.
- Inns. denotes the number of the innings in the match.
- Balls denotes the number of balls faced in an innings.
- NR denotes that the number of balls was not recorded.
- Parentheses next to the player's score denotes his century number at Edgbaston.
- The column title Date refers to the date the match started.
- The column title Result refers to the player's team result

=== One Day Internationals ===
No.	Score	Player	Team	Balls	Inns.	Opposing team	Date	Result
1	101	Krishnamachari Srikkanth	India	106	1	West Indies	25 January 1988	Lost
2	104*	Phil Simmons	West Indies	129	2	India	25 January 1988	Won
