= Yousuf Khan (footballer) =

Indian footballer

Personal information
- Full name: Mohammed Yousuf Khan
- Date of birth: 5 August 1937
- Place of birth: Hyderabad, British India
- Date of death: 1 July 2006 (aged 68)
- Place of death: Hyderabad, India
- Position: Midfielder

Senior career*
| Years | Team | Apps | (Gls) |
- Hyderabad City Police

International career
- India
Medal record
Men's football
Representing India
Asian Games
| Gold medal – first place | 1962 Jakarta | Team |
AFC Asian Cup
| Runner-up | 1964 Israel | Team |
- * Club domestic league appearances and goals

Yousuf Khan (5 August 1937 – 1 July 2006) was an Indian footballer who represented India national team at the 1960 Summer Olympics. He was one of only two Indians to have been included in the 1965 Asian All Stars XI. He was also a part of the team which won the 1962 Asian Games.

Khan represented Hyderabad in Santosh Trophy. He received the Arjuna Award in 1966.

== Honours ==
Hyderabad

- Santosh Trophy: 1956–57

India

- Asian Games Gold medal: 1962
- AFC Asian Cup runners-up: 1964
- Merdeka Tournament runner-up: 1964; third-place: 1965

Individual

- AFC Asian All Stars: 1965, 1966
- Arjuna Award: 1966
- Sportskeeda All time Indian Football XI

== See also ==
- Arjuna award recipients among Indian footballers
