= Nikhil Nandy =

Indian footballer (1932–2020)

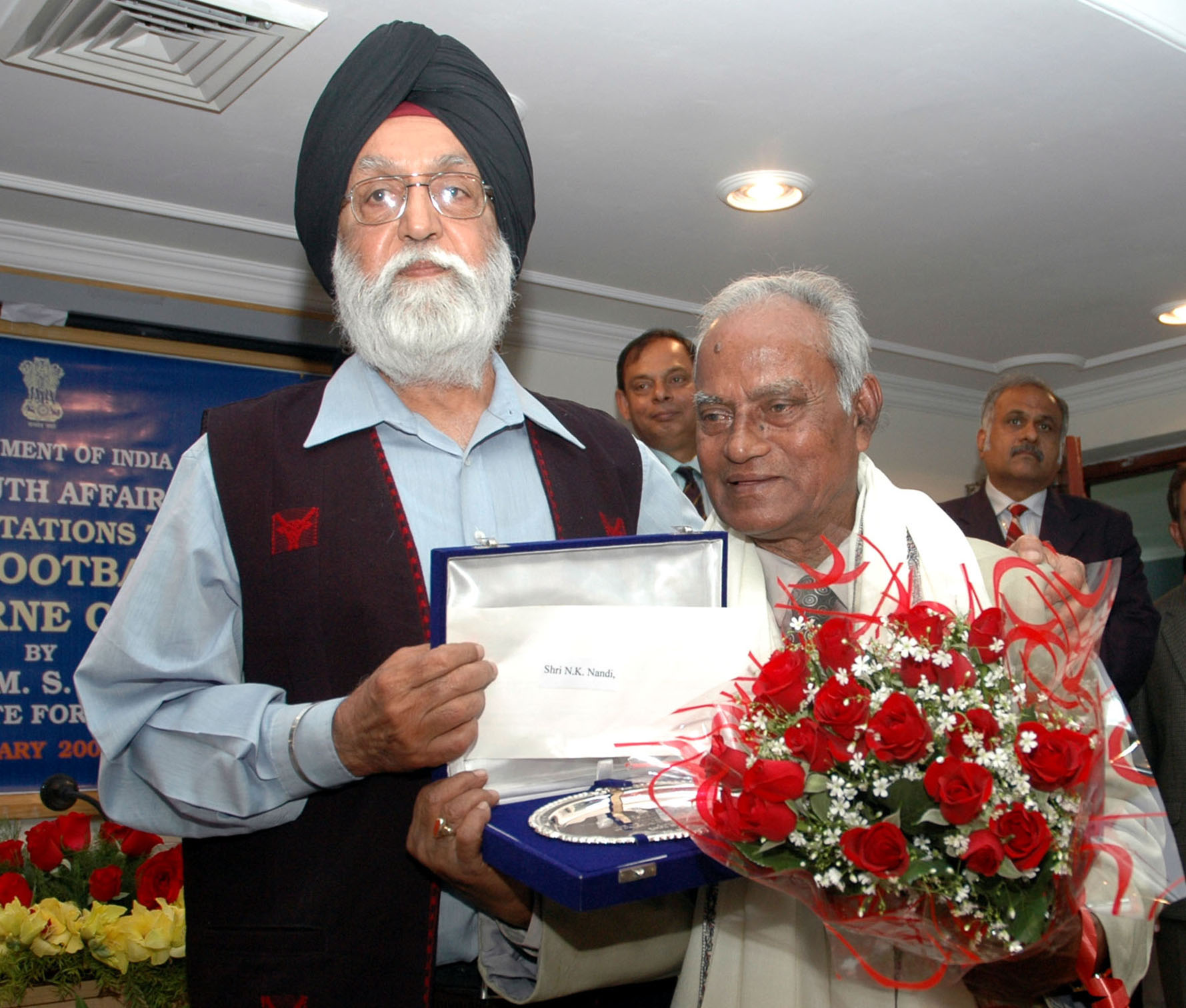
- Nandy being felicitated by Minister of Youth Affairs & Sports, Dr. M.S. Gill, in New Delhi on February 23, 2009.

Personal information
- Full name: Nikhil Kumar Nandy
- Date of birth: 1932
- Place of birth: Kolkata, India
- Date of death: 29 December 2020 (aged 88)
- Place of death: Nagerbazar, India
- Height: 1.61 m (5 ft 3 1/2 in)
- Position: Forward

Senior career*
Years	Team	Apps	(Gls)
- Eastern Railway
- Bengal

International career
- India

Managerial career
- 1974: India (assistant coach)
- * Club domestic league appearances and goals

Nikhil Nandy (1932 – 29 December 2020) was an Indian footballer. He competed in the men's tournament at the 1956 Summer Olympics. As an octogenarian, he was still engaged in coaching youngsters in Kolkata, India. He was part of Eastern Railway's historic Calcutta Football League win in 1958.

== Club career ==
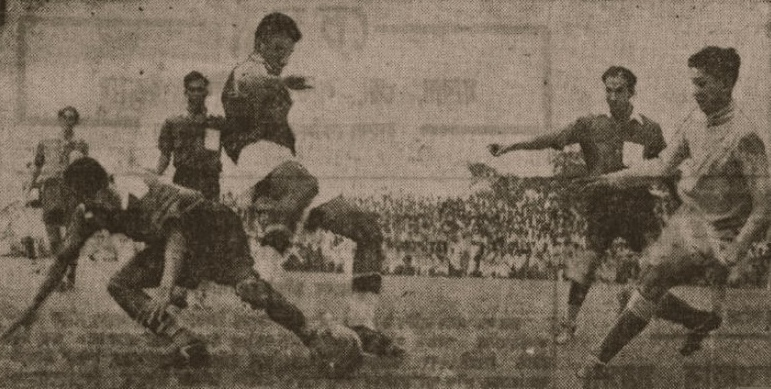
Nandy (L) tackling Muhammad Umer during a 1956 Calcutta League match between Mohammedan SC & Eastern Railway

Nandy was part of Eastern Railway's historic Calcutta Football League win in 1958.

He also played for Bengal

== Personal life ==
Nandy had two brothers, Anil and Santosh, who also played football and represented India internationally.

== Honours ==
Eastern Railway

- Calcutta Football League: 1958

Bengal

- Santosh Trophy: 1955–56, 1958-59
