= Muhammad Noor =

Indian footballer

Personal information
- Full name: N. Muhammad Noor
- Date of birth: 1925
- Place of birth: Hyderabad, British India
- Date of death: 9 June 2000 (aged 74–75)
- Place of death: Hyderabad, India

Senior career*
Years	Team	Apps	(Gls)
- Hyderabad City Police

International career
- India
Medal record
Men's football
Representing India
Asian Games
Gold medal – first place	1951 New Delhi	Team
- * Club domestic league appearances and goals

Muhammad Noor (1925 – 9 June 2000) was an Indian footballer. He competed in the men's tournament at the 1956 Summer Olympics.

== Playing career ==
In club football, Noor appeared with Hyderabad City Police FC, then one of the strongest sides in Indian football.

He later represented India national team, managed by Syed Abdul Rahim.

== Honours ==
India

- Asian Games Gold medal: 1951
- Asian Quadrangular Football Tournament: 1954

Hyderabad

- Santosh Trophy: 1956–57, 1957–58
