= Neville D'Souza =

Indian footballer (1932–1980)

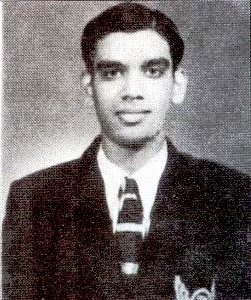
- D'Souza with India in the 1950s

Personal information
- Full name: Neville Steven Joseph D'Souza
- Date of birth: 3 August 1932
- Place of birth: Assagao, Goa, Portuguese India
- Date of death: 16 March 1980 (aged 47)
- Place of death: Bombay, Maharashtra, India
- Height: 1.68 m (5 ft 6 in)
- Position: Striker

Senior career*
Years	Team	Apps	(Gls)
1955–1956	Goans SC		
1956–1958	Tata SC		
1958–1963	Caltex SC	311	(92)

International career
1956–1962	India	13 (Note: According to RSSSF Neville played in 1954 Asian Games. But other sources suggests that he was not part of the squad. Hence the goal and matches at the 1954 Games are not included here.)	(10)
- * Club domestic league appearances and goals

Neville Steven Joseph D'Souza (3 August 1932 – 16 March 1980) was an Indian footballer who played as a striker. During the "golden era of Indian football" under legendary coach Syed Abdul Rahim, he was recognised one of the finest strikers of the Indian national team and having a good eye for goal. He appeared in the 1956 Summer Olympics, and finished the campaign as joint top scorer of the tournament with four goals, inducing a hat-trick in the quarterfinals against hosts Australia.

D'Souza was also a field hockey player, having represented various teams in both domestic and international tournaments.

== Hockey career ==
In his playing career, D'Souza choose field hockey first and represented the teams of both St. Xavier's High School and St. Xavier's College of Bombay. He later moved to Tata Sports Club and appeared in prestigious Beighton Cup, and won 1953 and 1954 editions in Calcutta. With the club, D'Souza toured to East Africa in 1952 and scored 34 goals in 17 matches. He then represented Bombay state hockey team in National Hockey Championship between 1953 and 1955.

== Football career ==
=== Club career ===
D'Souza began his club football career in Goan SC, before moving to Tata SC. In 1958, the club clinched Nadkarni Cup title. In the same year, he joined Hardwood League side Caltex SC. With the Bombay-based club, he played alongside noted Goan footballer Catao Fernandes. The club had honor of becoming the first local team in 1958 to win Rovers Cup, one of the oldest football tournament in the world, in which he was part of the team led by Anthony. In that final, they defeated renowned Mohammedan Sporting 3–2.

Beside Caltex, D'Souza also appeared with both Tata and Goan Sports Club.

=== International career ===
D'Souza played club football for Bombay. In the 1953 Asian Quadrangular Football Tournament in Rangoon, he scored the winner for India against arch-rival Pakistan. They also won the tournament in 1954 and 1955.

He represented his nation at the 1956 Summer Olympics in Melbourne, and reached the semi-finals, before going down 1–4 to Yugoslavia, which is still considered India's greatest ever achievement in football. Under the coaching of Syed Abdul Rahim, D'Souza played alongside J. Krishnaswamy, Samar Banerjee, P. K. Banerjee, and achieved fame worldwide. He became the first Asian player to score a hat-trick in an Olympic Games. D'Souza finished the tournament as joint top-scorer, with 4 goals in 3 games, including a hat-trick in a 4–2 win against Australia. Between 1956 and 1962, D'Souza scored ten goals for India. (Note: According to RSSSF Neville played in 1954 Asian Games. But other sources suggests that he was not part of the squad. Hence the goal and matches at the 1954 Games are not included here.)

== Career statistics ==
=== International goals ===
Date	Venue	Opponent	Result	Competition	Goals
23 October 1953	Bogyoke Aung San Stadium, Rangoon	Pakistan	1–0	1953 Colombo Cup	1
20 December 1955	Dacca Stadium, Dacca	Burma	5–2	1955 Colombo Cup	1
24 December 1955	Dacca Stadium, Dacca	Pakistan	2–1	1955 Colombo Cup	1
1 December 1956	Melbourne Stadium, Melbourne	Australia	4–2	1956 Olympics	3
4 December 1956	Melbourne Stadium, Melbourne	Yugoslavia	1–4	1956 Olympics	1
12 December 1956	Sydney Sports Ground, Sydney	Australia	7–1	Friendly	2

== Post-playing career ==
As a player, D'Souza retired in 1963 and began his coaching career. He later became a member of the selection panel of All India Football Federation (AIFF).

== Personal life ==
D'Souza was born in Assagao, Goa, on 3 August 1932. He moved to Bombay (now known as Mumbai) to complete studies. He married Lyra and they had a son named Nigel and two daughters, Liesel and Fleurel. Neville's brother Derek D'Souza was also a footballer, who represented India internationally and later managed NFL club Mahindra United.

== Death ==
D'Souza died of a brain haemorrhage on 16 March 1980, in Bombay.

== Legacy ==
Whenever I think about Indian football, his name comes to my mind. After we won, I remember the Australians calling our victory a "fluke" and demanding a rematch at Sydney after the Games ended. They were so stunned at the Olympic loss despite the home advantage that they were adamant about playing us again. We won the re-match with Neville scoring twice. Television was not around when Neville was playing for India at the Olympics and nor was video recordings possible, so people have no way of knowing how good he was in the goalmouth.

— S. S. Narayan (former Indian international; played with Neville at the 1956 Summer Olympics) on Neville D'Souza.

The Mumbai Football Association began organizing U-17 Neville D'Souza Trophy for teenagers from seventeen districts in Maharashtra, which is named after him.

In 2018, Neville D'Souza Football Turf (also known as 'Neville D'Souza Ground') was installed within the sports complex in Bandra, which is named after him, and it was inaugurated by Aaditya Thackeray, then chairman of the Mumbai District Football Association (MDFA).

== Honours ==
=== Hockey ===
Tata Sports Club

- Beighton Cup: 1953, 1954

=== Football ===
India

- Asian Quadrangular Football Tournament: 1953, 1954, 1955

Bombay

- Santosh Trophy : 1954–55 Runner-up: 1958–59

Caltex

- Rovers Cup: 1958

Individual

- Summer Olympics top scorer: 1956

Accolades

- Independence Day Award by the Government of Goa: 1990

== See also ==
- Goans in football
- History of Indian football
- History of the India national football team
- India national football team at the Olympics
- List of India national football team hat-tricks

== Bibliography ==
- Sharma, Nikhil Paramjit; Gupta, Shantanu (4 February 2019). India's Football Dream. SAGE Publications India. ISBN 9789353283063. Archived from the original on 4 October 2022.
- Shreekumar, S. S. (15 August 2020). The Best Way Forward for India's Football. HSRA Publications. ISBN 9788194721697. Archived from the original on 4 February 2023.
- Kapadia, Novy (2017). Barefoot to Boots: The Many Lives of Indian Football. Penguin Random House. ISBN 978-0-143-42641-7.
- Martinez, Dolores; Mukharjiim, Projit B (2009). Football: From England to the World: The Many Lives of Indian Football. Routledge. ISBN 978-1-138-88353-6. Archived from the original on 2 July 2022.
- "Triumphs and Disasters: The Story of Indian Football, 1889—2000" (PDF). Archived from the original (PDF) on 13 August 2012.
- Nath, Nirmal (2011). History of Indian Football: Upto 2009–10. Readers Service. ISBN 9788187891963. Archived from the original on 22 July 2022.
- Dineo, Paul; Mills, James (2001). Soccer in South Asia: Empire, Nation, Diaspora. London, United Kingdom: Frank Cass Publishers. ISBN 978-0-7146-8170-2. Archived from the original on 25 July 2022.
- Majumdar, Boria; Bandyopadhyay, Kausik (2006). A Social History Of Indian Football: Striving To Score. Routledge. ISBN 9780415348355. Archived from the original on 29 June 2021.
