= Muhammad Kannayan =

Indian footballer

Personal information
- Date of birth: 1932
- Place of birth: Bangalore
- Date of death: before 2016
- Height: 5 ft 2 in (1.57 m)
- Position: Forward

Senior career*
Years	Team	Apps	(Gls)
- Bengal Nagpur Railway

International career
- India
- * Club domestic league appearances and goals

Muhammad Kannayan (born 1932, died before 2016) was an Indian footballer. He competed in the men's tournament at the 1956 Summer Olympics.

On 13 September 1984, a benefit match for Kannayan was held on the Mohun Bagan Ground. Several former greats like Chuni Goswami, Peter Thangaraj, Jarnail Singh, P. K. Banerjee, T. Balaram and Ahmed Khan took part. Kannayan had become poor to the point of starvation by this time.
