= Muhammad Salaam =

Indian footballer

Personal information
- Full name: Muhammad Abdul Salaam
- Date of birth: 1931
- Place of birth: Hyderabad, British India (now in Telangana)
- Date of death: 3 December 2016
- Place of death: Hyderabad, Telangana, India
- Height: 1.80 m (5 ft 11 in)
- Position: Midfielder

Senior career*
Years	Team	Apps	(Gls)
- Mohammedan SC

International career
- India

Managerial career
- 1974: India U20
- 1983: India
- Andhra Pradesh
- * Club domestic league appearances and goals

Muhammad Abdul Salaam (1931 – 3 December 2016), also known as Syed Abdus Salam, was an Indian former footballer. He competed in the men's tournament at the 1956 Summer Olympics.

== Honours ==
=== Player ===
Mohammedan Sporting

- Calcutta Football League: 1957
- IFA Shield: 1957

=== Manager ===
India U19

- AFC Youth Championship: 1974

== See also ==
- List of India national football team managers
