= Hyderabad City Police FC =

Indian former association football club from Hyderabad

Hyderabad City Police (Andhra Pradesh Police)
- Full name: Hyderabad City Police Football Club
- Nickname: City Afghans
- Short name: HCPFC
- Founded: 1939; 87 years ago
- Ground: Various
- Owner: Hyderabad City Police
- League: Various

Hyderabad City Police Football Club (popularly known by the nickname City Afghans) was an Indian institutional football club, being the most famous and powerful team in Hyderabad, affiliated to the Hyderabad Football Association (HFA).

The club was associated and affiliated with Hyderabad City Police during reign of the Nizam of Hyderabad. From 1939 until the merger of Andhra, and Hyderabad Football Associations, the club shaped the sporting culture in the province.

== History ==
Hyderabad City Police had enjoyed a series of endless achievements in the pre-Independence era, the first non-Kolkata club to do so. In 1941, the club reached final of prestigious Stafford Challenge Cup, but a defeat in hands of Bangalore Muslims Club let them finishing runner-up. The first major success came in 1943 when the team win Ashe Gold Cup final against Bangalore. The club established its legendary performance on national level when it won the prestigious Durand Cup against Mohun Bagan, the cup was held after a break of 8 years and first time after Indian Independence; it won total 4 Durand Cups, including one as Andhra Pradesh Police after 1959. The club won Rovers Cup consistently for five years from 1950 to 1954, and state league championships for 11 consecutive years.

It was N. A. Fruvall who shaped the club in his captainship early from 1940s, and by 1950 the team was transformed into the national champions. In 1951, Syed Abdul Rahim took over Hyderabad City Police club as a coach and served until his death in 1963. They also finished as runners-up in DCM Trophy twice, in 1959 and 1965.

The team underwent a change in name in the 1960s after the state of Andhra Pradesh was formed and Hyderabad became its capital, with the change in name of the police force to Andhra Pradesh Police. They continued to play as Andhra Pradesh Police Football Club and won tournaments like Rovers Cup in 1960 and DCM Trophy in 1965.

== Notable players ==
Hyderabad City Police was one of power houses of Indian football, praised for producing some of country's legendary players like Sayed Khwaja Aziz-ud-Din, Muhammad Noor, Syed Nayeemuddin, Anthony Patrick, Yousuf Khan,Syed Shahid Hakim and Syed Moinuddin. In the 1950s, the club achieved success with their 2–3–5 formation.

== Honours ==
- Durand Cup
  - Champions (4): 1950–51, 1954, 1957–58, 1961
  - Runners-up (3): 1952, 1956–57, 1963
- Rovers Cup
  - Champions (9): 1950, 1951, 1952, 1953, 1954, 1957, 1960, 1962*, 1963–64
- IFA Shield
  - Runners-up (2): 1954, 1962
- DCM Trophy
  - Champions (2): 1959, 1965
  - Runners-up (2): 1964, 1970
- Sait Nagjee Football Tournament
  - Champions (1): 1958, 1959
- Stafford Challenge Cup
  - Runners-up (1): 1941
- Madura Cup
  - Champions (1): 1947

(*) joint winners with East Bengal

== See also ==
- History of Indian football
- List of football clubs in India
