= 1959 Merdeka Tournament =

Tournament details
- Host country: Federation of Malaya
- Dates: 30 August – 6 September
- Teams: 7
- Venue: 1 (in 1 host city)

Final positions
- Champions: Malaya (2nd title)
- Runners-up: India
- Third place: South Vietnam
- Fourth place: Hong Kong

Tournament statistics
- Matches played: 14
- Goals scored: 52 (3.71 per match)

The 1959 Merdeka Tournament (Malay: 1959 Pestabola Merdeka) was the third invitational international association football championship held to commemorate the independence of Malaya. Hosted by Malaya, the competition ran from 30 August to 6 September 1959 and was contested by the national teams of Hong Kong, India, Japan, Malaya, Singapore, South Korea and South Vietnam.

After two rounds of play, Malaya were crowned champions of the competition after defeating Hong Kong 2–1 in their final match.

== Background ==
The Merdeka Tournament was founded in 1957 as a means to celebrate Independence Day in Malaya. It is the oldest invitational international association football tournament in Asia. The inaugural tournament was won by Hong Kong. Malaya were the defending champions after winning the previous edition in 1958.

== Format ==
In the first round, the six invited teams were drawn into three knock-out ties. The winner of each tie would advance to the second round and the losers would contest a consolation round. In the event of a draw, the tie was replayed. Hosts Malaya received a bye to the second round. The four remaining teams contested a single round robin group to decide the winner of the tournament. The three teams in the consolation round also contested a single round robin group. Teams finishing level on points would contest a play-off to determine the final placings.

=== Participants ===
- Hong Kong
- India
- Japan
- Malaya
- Singapore
- South Korea
- South Vietnam

== Venue ==
All matches were played at the Merdeka Stadium in Kuala Lumpur.

== First round ==
South Vietnam and Indonesia advanced to the second round after defeating South Korea and Singapore respectively. After a 1–1 draw, Hong Kong defeated Japan 4–2 in a replay.

First round
Team 1	Score	Team 2
South Vietnam	3–2	South Korea
India	2–0	Singapore
Hong Kong	1–1 (replay: 4–2)	Japan

30 August 1959

South Vietnam	3–2	South Korea

Merdeka Stadium, Kuala Lumpur

31 August 1959

India	2–0	Singapore
Rahmatullah 52'; Balaram 61'

Merdeka Stadium, Kuala Lumpur
Attendance: 20,000

31 August 1959

Hong Kong	1–1	Japan

Merdeka Stadium, Kuala Lumpur

=== Replay ===
2 September 1959

Japan	2–4	Hong Kong

Merdeka Stadium, Kuala Lumpur

== Second round ==
Malaya recorded two wins and a draw from their three matches to win the competition.

=== Table ===
Pos	Team	Pld	W	D	L	GF	GA	GD	Pts	Qualification
1	Malaya	3	2	1	0	7	5	+2	5	Champion
2	India	3	1	2	0	5	3	+2	4	
3	South Vietnam	3	1	1	1	9	7	+2	3	
4	Hong Kong	3	0	0	3	2	8	−6	0	

=== Matches ===
2 September 1959

Malaya	4–3	South Vietnam

Merdeka Stadium, Kuala Lumpur
3 September 1959

India	2–0	Hong Kong
Zulfiqaruddin 8'; Kannan 79'

Merdeka Stadium, Kuala Lumpur
Attendance: 11,000

4 September 1959

Malaya	1–1	India
Robert Choe 60' (pen.)		Kannan 63'

Merdeka Stadium, Kuala Lumpur
Attendance: 18,000
5 September 1959

South Vietnam	4–1	Hong Kong

Merdeka Stadium, Kuala Lumpur

6 September 1959

Malaya	2–1	Hong Kong

Merdeka Stadium, Kuala Lumpur
6 September 1959

South Vietnam	2–2	India
Đỗ Thới Vinh 20', 53'		Zulfiqaruddin 8'; Kannan 56'

Merdeka Stadium, Kuala Lumpur

== Consolation round ==
Japan and South Korea both finished with one win and one draw so a play-off was organised to determine the winner of the consolation round.

=== Table ===
Pos	Team	Pld	W	D	L	GF	GA	GD	Pts	Qualification
5	Japan	2	1	1	0	4	1	+3	3	Play-off
5	South Korea	2	1	1	0	4	1	+3	3	Play-off
7	Singapore	2	0	0	2	2	8	−6	0	

=== Matches ===
2 September 1959

South Korea	4–1	Singapore

Merdeka Stadium, Kuala Lumpur

3 September 1959

Japan	4–1	Singapore

Merdeka Stadium, Kuala Lumpur

5 September 1959

South Korea	0–0	Japan

Merdeka Stadium, Kuala Lumpur

=== Play-off ===
6 September 1959

South Korea	3–1	Japan

Merdeka Stadium, Kuala Lumpur
