= Samar Banerjee =

Indian footballer (1930–2022)

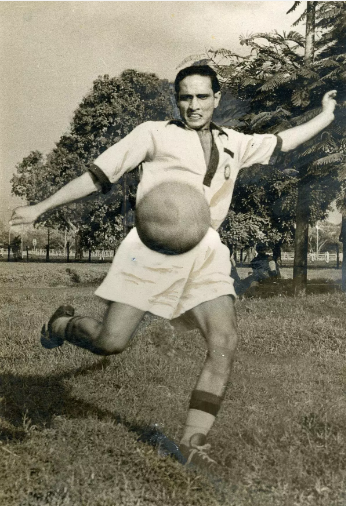
- Badru Banerjee in 1955 playing for India.

Personal information
- Date of birth: 30 January 1930
- Place of birth: Bally, Howrah, Bengal Presidency, British India
- Date of death: 20 August 2022 (aged 92)
- Place of death: Kolkata, West Bengal, India
- Height: 5 ft 4 in (1.63 m)
- Position: Striker

Senior career*
| Years | Team | Apps | (Gls) |
| 1948 | Bally Protiva Club | | |
| 1949–1952 | Bengal Nagpur Railway | | |
| 1952–1959 | Mohun Bagan | | |

International career
| 1954–1956 | India | | |

Managerial career
- 1961–1962: Bengal
- * Club domestic league appearances and goals

Samar "Badru" Banerjee (Bengali: সমর "বদ্রু" ব্যানার্জী; 30 January 1930 – 20 August 2022) was an Indian footballer who played primarily as a striker for the India national football team. He captained India at the 1956 Summer Olympics in Melbourne, where they achieved fourth place.

== Early and personal life ==
Samar Banerjee was born on 30 January 1930, in Bally, Howrah, Bengal Presidency. His father, Sasanka Sekhar Banerjee, enrolled him in R. G. Kar Medical College for medical education. In 1959, he got a job in Burma Shell Company, and was posted in Siliguri. However, his love for the game brought him back to Kolkata for training on weekends, but hanged up his boots later after having a remarkable playing career.

== Club career ==
Banerjee's footballing journey started as a school-going kid. In his childhood, after returning from school, going to kick football became a kind of rule. He started playing at Bali Hindu Sporting Club and also used to play football at Wellington Club. At the age of 18, he went on to represent Bally Protiva Club, a third division team of Calcutta Football League at that time. In an interview on the website of Mohun Bagan AC, Badru said, "Since then I started playing with boots. As a result, when I got the chance to play in the boots later on, I didn't have a day even though my teammates were struggling." Having impressed with his skills, he was roped in by Bengal Nagpur Railway FC (BNR).

He later joined Mohun Bagan AC during an excellent eight-year stint. The formation of Banerjee's deadly combination up front with Kesto Pal achieved endless success in the century old club. Banerjee won the IFA Shield in his debut season with the "green-and-maroon brigade" in controversial final against Rajasthan Club of Calcutta. He then guided the club to their first ever Durand Cup next season. Banerjee again hogged the Maidan limelight in 1954 when they secured another first, a double with the CFL and IFA Shield titles. He was also part of Mohun Bagan's foreign tour of 1956, in which they won all four matches.

In 1958, Banerjee was chosen as team captain. Besides guiding Mohun Bagan to several trophies including their first ever Durand Cup in 1953, Rovers Cup in 1955, Banerjee has represented West Bengal and won Santosh Trophy twice in 1953 and 1955.

== International career ==
Banerjee went on to represent Syed Abdul Rahim–managed India national team during the "golden era" of Indian football. He then toured with the club to East Africa, with players including P. K. Banerjee. He also played under captaincy of Sailen Manna in international matches, and is highly influenced by him during his playing career.

With India, he participated in three Summer Olympics and captained the team in 1956 that finished fourth, after losing to Bulgaria 3–0 in the bronze medal playoff. Banerjee also appeared with the India against numerous visiting European teams in exhibition matches in 1954, including a 1–0 defeat to Allsvenskan club AIK at CC&FC Ground in Kolkata.

== Managerial career ==
After retiring, Banerjee involved in coaching and managed then Calcutta Football League premier division side Barisha Sporting Club. He then became head coach of Bengal in 1961, and guided the team winning 1962 Santosh Trophy.

== Death ==
Banerjee died from complications of COVID-19 on 20 August 2022, at the age of 92.

== Career statistics ==
Scores and results list India's goal tally first, score column indicates score after each Banerjee goal.

List of international goals scored by Samar Banerjee
| No. | Date | Venue | Opponent | Result | Competition |
|---|---|---|---|---|---|
| 1 | 12 December 1956 | Sydney Sports Ground, Sydney, Australia | Australia | 7–1 | Friendly |

== Honours ==
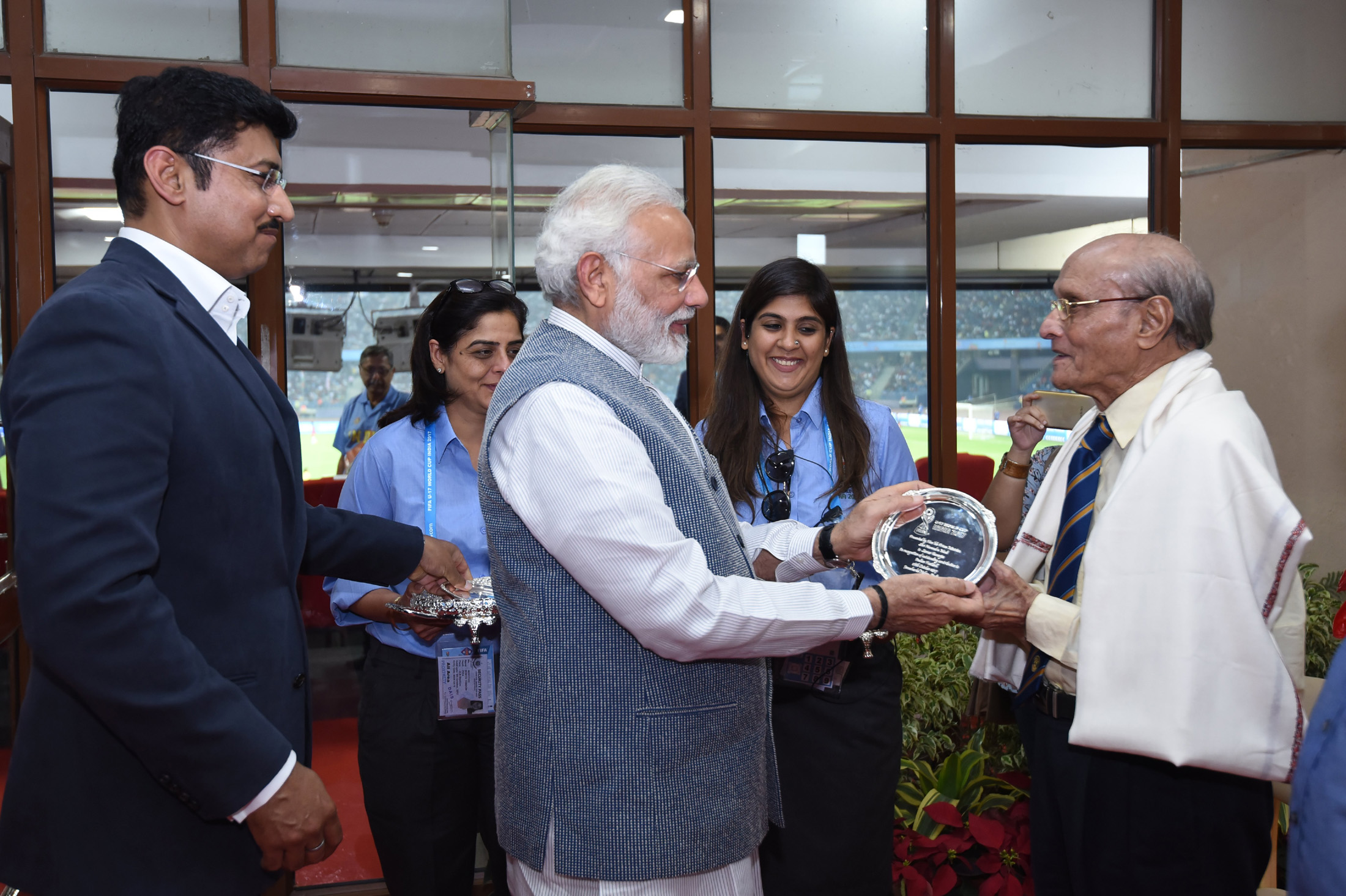
Banerjee being felicitated by the Indian prime minister Narendra Modi in New Delhi, 2017.

Mohun Bagan

- Durand Cup: 1953
- Calcutta Football League: 1954, 1955, 1956, 1959
- IFA Shield: 1952, 1954, 1956
- Rovers Cup: 1955

India

- Asian Quadrangular Football Tournament: 1954

Bengal

- Santosh Trophy: 1953, 1955

Individual

- Mohun Bagan Ratna: 2009
- Jiban Kriti Sanman by the Government of West Bengal: 2017

== See also ==
- History of Indian football
- History of the India national football team
- India national football team at the Olympics
- List of India national football team captains

== Bibliography ==
- Kapadia, Novy (2017). Barefoot to Boots: The Many Lives of Indian Football. Penguin Random House. ISBN 978-0-143-42641-7.
- Majumdar, Boria; Bandyopadhyay, Kausik (2006). A Social History Of Indian Football: Striving To Score. Routledge. ISBN 9780415348355. Archived from the original on 29 June 2021.
- Basu, Jaydeep (2003). Stories from Indian Football. UBS Publishers' Distributors. ISBN 9788174764546. Archived from the original on 11 October 2022.
- Mukhopadhay, Subir (2018). সোনায় লেখা ইতিহাসে মোহনবাগান (transl. Mohun Bagan in the history written in gold). ISBN 978-93-850172-0-9.
- Banerjee, Argha; Basu, Rupak (2022). মোহনবাগান: সবুজ ঘাসের মেরুন গল্প (transl. Mohun Bagan: Green fields' Maroon stories). Shalidhan. ISBN 978-81-954667-0-2.
- Dineo, Paul; Mills, James (2001). Soccer in South Asia: Empire, Nation, Diaspora. London, United Kingdom: Frank Cass Publishers. p. 33. ISBN 978-0-7146-8170-2. Archived from the original on 25 July 2022.
- Martinez, Dolores; Mukharji, Projit B (2009). Football: From England to the World: The Many Lives of Indian Football. Routledge. ISBN 978-1-138-88353-6. Archived from the original on 2 July 2022.
- Nath, Nirmal (2011). History of Indian Football: Upto 2009–10. Readers Service. ISBN 9788187891963. Archived from the original on 22 July 2022.
- "Triumphs and Disasters: The Story of Indian Football, 1889—2000" (PDF). Archived from the original (PDF) on 13 August 2012.
- Majumdar, Boria, Bandyopadhyay, Kausik (2006). Goalless: The Story of a Unique Footballing Nation. Penguin India. ISBN 9780670058747.
- Bandyopadhyay, Kausik (2008). "Football in Bengali culture and society: a study in the social history of football in Bengal 1911–1980". Shodhganga. University of Calcutta. p. 35. hdl:10603/174532. Archived from the original on 7 October 2022.
