= Peter Thangaraj =

Indian footballer

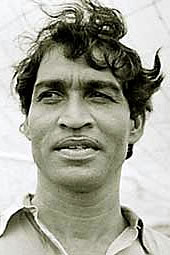

Personal information
- Date of birth: 24 December 1935
- Place of birth: Hyderabad
- Date of death: 24 November 2008 (aged 72)
- Place of death: Bokaro, India
- Height: 1.90 m (6 ft 3 in)
- Positions: Goalkeeper; centre-forward (Note: Thangaraj played occasionally as a centre-forward.)

Senior career*
Years	Team	Apps	(Gls)
1953–1960	Madras Regimental Centre		
1960–1963	Mohammedan Sporting		
1963–1965	Mohun Bagan		
1965–1971	East Bengal		
1971–1972	Mohammedan Sporting		

International career
1955–1966	India	48	(0)
Medal record
Men's football
Representing India
Asian Games
Gold medal – first place	1962 Jakarta	Team
AFC Asian Cup
Runner-up	1964 Israel	Team
- * Club domestic league appearances and goals

Havildar Peter Thangaraj (24 December 1935 – 24 November 2008) was an Indian football player and a non-commissioned officer in the Indian Army. Thangaraj played for the Indian national side at the 1956 Melbourne and 1960 Rome Olympics. He was voted Asia's best goalkeeper in 1958. Thangaraj was a recipient of Arjuna Award for the year 1967.

Thangaraj played domestic club football for both the Calcutta Football League clubs Mohun Bagan and East Bengal. He earned fame during his days with the "red and gold brigade" from 1965 to 1971, and captained the team in 1969–70. He was the first choice goalkeeper for the club over the years.

== Club career ==
Thangraj was born in 1935 in Hyderabad State into a Tamil family from Ammuguda. He began his football career with Morning Star Club, and then moved to Friends Union Club of Secunderabad. He joined the Indian Army in 1953 and began representing the Madras Regimental Centre where he played as a centre forward, but took to goalkeeping subsequently with great success. Madras Regimental Centre won the Durand Cup in 1955 and 1958. Thangaraj captained the Services team for its first-ever triumph in the Santosh Trophy in 1960.

As a goalkeeper, he was simply unbeatable. He had a little weakness with ground shots but in the air, he was superb. He used to pluck the ball in the air from attacks or corner kicks. Even from penalties, at point-blank range, he would pull off miraculous saves.

— Gautam Roy, football historian, on Peter Thangaraj to the Olympic Channel.

After leaving Services, Thangaraj played for Kolkata giants Mohammedan Sporting (1960–63, 1971–72), Mohun Bagan (1963–65), and East Bengal (1965–71) and was a huge fan favorite at the time. He was part of the Bengal team, which won the Santosh Trophy in 1963. Later, he led the Railways in 1965 and won the Santosh Trophy for them. Along with the likes of Chuni Goswami and P. K. Banerjee, Thangaraj was one of the mainstays of the Indian team in 1960s and 70s.

== International career ==
Thangaraj had an illustrious international career. His first stint with the Indian team was the Asian Quadrangular Football Tournament held at Rangoon held in 1953. Under the coaching of Syed Abdul Rahim, he played for India both at the 1956 and 1960 Olympics, and represented India at 1958 Tokyo, 1962 Jakarta, and 1966 Bangkok Asian Games. India won the Gold Medal at the 1962 Jakarta Asian Games.

He represented India at the Merdeka Cup tournament held at Kuala Lumpur from 1958 to 1966. He also represented India at the 1964 and 1966 Asian Cup held in Israel and Burma respectively. He was named the Best Goalkeeper of Asia in 1958, and awarded the Arjuna Award in 1967. Recognizing his contribution to Indian football, he was awarded the Arjuna Award by the government of India in 1997. He twice played for the Asian All-Star team and was adjudged the Best Goalkeeper in 1967. Thangaraj retired from active football in 1971 and then took to coaching.

== Managerial career ==
After retirement, in 1973, Thangaraj became head coach of the football team of Aligarh Muslim University. He later managed Goa Professional League side Vasco SC until 1975. After that he joined Steel Authority of India Limited and remained in Bokaro Steel Plant from 1976 till his retirement in 1995. At that time, Vasco won Bordoloi Trophy, KFA Shield and Chakola Gold Trophy in 1973.

== Later life, death and legacy ==
Thangaraj was a devoted follower of Lev Yashin, and was later appointed as advisor of the football department/division of Bokaro Steel Plant. He died in Bokaro (now in Jharkhand), on 24 November 2008 after a heart-attack.

Legendary strikers of India, Chuni Goswami and P. K. Banerjee often credited his long kicks as source of some of their best goals in career.

== Honours ==
India

- Asian Games Gold medal: 1962
- AFC Asian Cup runners-up: 1964
- Asian Quadrangular Football Tournament: 1955
- Merdeka Tournament runner-up: 1959; third-place: 1966

Madras Regimental Centre

- Durand Cup: 1955, 1958

Mohun Bagan

- Durand Cup: 1963, 1964, 1965
- Calcutta Football League: 1963, 1964, 1965

East Bengal

- IFA Shield: 1970

Services

- Santosh Trophy: 1960–61

Bengal

- Santosh Trophy: 1962–63

Railways

- Santosh Trophy: 1964–65

Individual

- Arjuna Award: 1967
- AFC Asian All Stars: 1967
- AFC – Best Goalkeeper of Asia: 1958
- East Bengal Club Goalkeeper of the Millennium
- Asian Goalkeepers of the Century: 2000
- Sportskeeda All time Indian Football XI

== See also ==
- List of East Bengal Club captains
