= 1950–51 Santosh Trophy =

National Football Championship

Tournament details
- Country: India

Final positions
- Champions: Bengal (5th title)
- Runners-up: Hyderabad
- 60 minute matches

The 1950–51 Santosh Trophy was the seventh edition of the Santosh Trophy, the main State competition for football in India. It was held in Calcutta, West Bengal. Bengal defeated Hyderabad 1–0 in the final. Bengal was captained by Sailen Manna.

== Preliminary Matches ==
7 August 1950

Bengal	5–0	Madhya Pradesh
Mewalal 16', 22', 23'; Guha Thakurta; Ahmed Khan	Report

Calcutta
Referee: Sushil Ghosh
10 August 1950

Orissa	3–0	Bihar
Bachan 2', 17'; Samal 28'	Report

Calcutta
15 August 1950

Uttar Pradesh	2–1	Bombay
	Report

Calcutta

== Quarter Finals ==
13 August 1950

Delhi	3–0	Services
Naththu 2', 32'; S. Thapa 59'	Report

Calcutta
14 August 1950

Orissa	3–2	Mysore
	Report

Calcutta
19 August 1950

Hyderabad	5–0	Uttar Pradesh
Sussay Jr 6'; Amarnath 13' (o.g.); Moin; Layeek	Report

Calcutta
Referee: Ramen Bagchin

Moin scored in the 18th and 23rd minutes of the second half and Layeek in the 29th.

== Semifinals ==
18 August 1950

Bengal	5–0	Orissa
Mewalal 12', 15', 22'; Venkatesh; Saleh	Report

Calcutta
Referee: A. Jayaraman
21 August 1950

Hyderabad	2–2	Delhi
Asghar 12'; Moin 19'	Report	Naththu 15' (?)

Calcutta
Referee: Sushil Ghosh
24 August 1950

Hyderabad	2–0 replay	Delhi
	Report

Calcutta
Referee: Sushil Ghosh

== Final ==
28 August 1950

Bengal	1–0	Hyderabad
Mewalal	Report

Calcutta

Mewalal's scored in the 6th minute of the second half from a center by Saleh

== Squads ==
- Bengal : M. Sarkar; B. Bose and S. Manna (captain); Latif, S. Sarbadhikary and A.Ghosh; Venkatesh, R Guha Thakurta, Mewalal, Ahmed Khan and Saleh played in the final. Also B. Anthony, Mahinder, Syeed, A Dasgupta
- Hyderabad : Ramaswamy; Ali and Fruvall; Patrick, Jamal, Noor, Moin, Layeek; Sussay (Sr), Sussay (Jr) and Mohammad played in the final. Also Aziz and Ayyub.
- Delhi : Hardev, Ghanshyam and Gulzari; Yusuf, Jayaraman and Kewal; Satpal (sr), Dharambir, Naththu, Mahinder Kumar and S Thapa
- Orissa : Bari; Alam and Enayat; Jenamani, Sachi Das and Chitta Sahu; Biranjan Bera, Golak Samal, A. M. Bachan (captain), Sita Ramarao and Tareque Hussain
- Bombay : Christoper (St Francis Goans), Arikinathan (Rashids), goalkeepers; Papen (Tata) and Chinnathambi Pillay (Maharashtra), backs; Narayan (Culture League), Gabriel D'Costa (Goan Sports), Shanker (Rashids), Lyngdoh (Indian Navy) and Damodar (Tata), halves; Stewart (Indian Navy), Parab (Culture League), Kuppuswami (Rashids), Peter Ferrao (Tata), Thomas (Culture League), Anthony Braganza (Tata) and Verghese (Rashids). Captain : Parab, Vice Captain : Leslie Woodcock, Manager : N. N. Guha
- Bihar : D Sen; Qurban, B. Dutta, Parshid, Safi, Kanjilal
- Madhya Pradesh : S Ganguly; Ramalu and T. Ford; Narmade Prasad, Balaiya and Narsaiyah; G.Chatterji, Ramdas, P.K. Roy, M. Kumar and M.I. Haque
- Uttar Pradesh : Anu Bose; S.K. Sarkar and Amarnath; Radheyshyam, Bihari and Qasim; S. Mukherji, Bibhas Ghosh, S.N. Sarkar, Hafeez and Dajeet Singh
