= 1949–50 Santosh Trophy =

National Football Championship

Tournament details
- Country: India
- Teams: 13

Final positions
- Champions: Bengal (4th title)
- Runners-up: Hyderabad

Tournament statistics
- Matches played: 12
- Goals scored: 50 (4.17 per match)
- Top goal scorer: Mewalal (11 goals)
- 60 minute matches

The 1949–50 Santosh Trophy was the sixth edition of the Santosh Trophy, the main State competition for football in India. Bengal defeated Hyderabad 5–0 in the final. This was Bengal's sixth final appearance and the fourth title.

The tournament was held in Calcutta, West Bengal and the matches were played on the grounds of Calcutta Football Club, Mohammedan Sporting and the Aryan Football Club.

There was no Santosh Trophy in the 1948–49 season because of the delay in finding a venue.

== Early rounds ==
26 July 1949

Hyderabad	3–0	Orissa
Sussay 10'; Duraiswamy 32', 54'	Report

CFC Ground, Calcutta
Referee: A. Roy
26 July 1949

Bengal	9–0	Central Provinces
Ramulu 7' (o.g.); Abid 15'; Mewalal 25', 34', 36', 50', 58'; R. Das 29', 41'	Report

CFC Ground, Calcutta
Referee: P.S. Gopalan
30 July 1949

Madras	2–1	Delhi
D'Cruz 4', 6'	Report	1' Karam Chand

CFC Ground, Calcutta
Referee: Sushil Ghosh
30 July 1949

Bihar	3–1	Assam
A. Ghosh 3' (o.g.); A. Mukherjee 24'; Bhagabati 40'	Report	6' Presswell

CFC Ground, Calcutta
Referee: R Bagchi
1 August 1949

Services	4–1	United Provinces
A. Bose 10'; Sukhlal 23'; Lall Bahadur 59'; Mukundan 60'	Report	S. Banerjee 11'

Calcutta
Referee: Dr. S. Dutt

The second half was played in heavy rain.

== Quarter-finals ==
28 July 1949

Hyderabad	3–2	Bombay
Moin 50', 53'; Sussay 60'	Report	1', 6' Anwar

CFC Ground, Calcutta
Referee: N. Sen
29 July 1949

Bengal	5–0	Rajputana
Mewalal 12', 15', 25'; Daud Mohamed 22'; S. Nandy 50'	Report

Calcutta
Referee: S.A. Rahim
1 August 1949

Madras	3–2	Bihar
D'Cruz 18'; Thyagarajan 48'; Kandaswami 50'	Report	4' Bhagabati; 6' S. Ganguly

Calcutta
Referee: S. Pathak
2 August 1949

Services	1–0	Mysore
Dhan Bahadur 60'	Report

Calcutta
Referee: P.S. Gopalan

== Semifinals ==
3 August 1949

Bengal	3–1	Madras
Latif 7'; S. Ghosh 10', 32'	Report	52' D'Cruz

Calcutta
Referee: Major F. Upfold
4 August 1949

Hyderabad	1–0	Services
Moin 49'	Report

Calcutta
Referee: Sushil Ghosh

Sukhlal equalised in the last minute for Services but was off-side

== Final ==
6 August 1949

Bengal	5–0	Hyderabad
Mewalal 4', 32', 40'; Abid 5', 44'	Report

Calcutta
Referee: Major Upfold

The awards were presented the next day by Kailash Nath Katju, the Governor of West Bengal, at the Great Eastern Hotel, Calcutta. On the same day, a 15-member Indian football team to tour Afghanistan was selected, captained by Abid Hossain of Bengal, East Bengal and Lucknow University. The team was composed mainly of students.

== Squads ==
- Bengal : M. Sarkar (Bhowanipore); Taj Mohammad (East Bengal) and D. Paul (Mohun Bagan); Latif (Mohammedan Sporting), Dad Muhammad (Mohammedan Sporting) and S. Roy (Kalighat); R. Das (Bhowanipore), Abid Hossain (East Bengal), Mewalal (E.I. Railway), Sattar (Mohammedan Sporting) and S. Nandy (captain, E.I. Railway) Also, M. Ghatak (East Bengal) (goal keeper); Abhay Ghose (Mohun Bagan); S. Ghosh (E.I. Railway), N. Bose (Bhowanipore), Anthony (Mohammedan Sporting), Sailen Manna (Mohun Bagan), Anil Dey, S. Mookerjee (Sporting Union), Dr. Kumar

Bengal was captained by Anil Dey in the first two matches, Sailen Manna in the quarter final and S. Nandy in the semi-final and final.

- Hyderabad : Erayya (Hyderabad City Police, ; Aziz (National Sporting) and Fruvall (captain, City Police); Pindari (Ordinance Dept), Jamal (City Police) and Noor Mohamed (City Police); Laiq (Hunters), Sussay (City Police), Moin (City Police), Duraiswami (Ordinance Dept) and Mahmud (City Police) Also, F. Rahim (Hyderabad Sporting), Ansari (Hyderabad Sporting), Narayan Prasad (Hyderabad Sporting), Asghar (National Sporting) and Yelliah (Railway Recreation Club). Manager : Syed Abdul Rahim, Assistant Manager : Maqdoom
- Services : Khem Bahadur; Thomas and Ranbir; Gokul, Chandan Singh and Puran Gurang; Lal Bahadur, Mukundan, Dhan Bahadur, Sukhlal and Puran Thapa. Also Capt. Rao
- Mysore : Varadaraj; Arokiaswami and Masoom; Basheer, Summukhan and C. Thambi; Baboo, Arikiraj, Nari, Raman and Ramaiah
- Madras : Muniswami; Rajavelu and Anjanallu; Gurunathan, Alagarswami and Murugeshan; A. Kandaswami, Thangaraj, D'Cruz, Iyyadurai and Thyagarajan Also, Thangaswamy, Nelson, Hanumant Rao
- Bihar : A. Roy; K.S. Mani and C.S. Ramaiah; P. Narayan, Salauddin and G. Mohamed; M. Shafi, S. Ganguli, Bhagabati, S. Kanjilal and A. Mukherjee
- Assam : D. Singh; U. Das and J. Roy Chowdhury; D. Dunn, N. Das and A. Ghosh; K. Bardoloi, H. Dey, Presswell, N. Chowdhury and B. Mukherjee
- Delhi : Hardeo Sahai; R.K. Dasgupta and Trilok Nath Lan; P.K. Dasgupta, Satprakash and R. Prasad; Satpal, Karam Chand, Chandoin, Mohendrapai and S. Thappa
- Rajputana : Lee; Chandermull and Ambica Dutt; Ibrahim, Randhir Singh and Uday Karan; Satyanarain, Jethmull, Shew Dutt, Mumtaz and Mul Singh
- Bombay : Sanjiva; Woodcock and Papen; Narayan, Krishnan and Govind; Anwar, Parab, Ferrao, Thomas and Peters
- Central Provinces : Abdul Jabbar; Claudius and Ramulu; Shewcharan, Baliah and Abbul Azim; A. Rahim, Bose, Ramdas, Maniram and Baboo
- Orissa : Rajani; Alam and Enayat; Bipin, Sachi and Kamayya; Biranjan, Bulu, Tarikh (capt), William Paul and Tiki
- United Provinces : Anu Bose; Naka Banerjee and Amiya Banerjee; Behari Lal, Aziz and Mahabir Prasad; S. Mukherjee, Bibhas Ghosh, Shally, Subhas Banerjee and Daljit Singh
