= 1974–75 Santosh Trophy =

Tournament details
- Country: India
- Dates: November 1974

Final positions
- Champions: Punjab (2nd title)
- Runners-up: Bengal

Tournament statistics
- Top goal scorer: Inder Singh (23 goals)

The 1974–75 Santosh Trophy was the 31st edition of the Santosh Trophy, the main State competition for football in India. It was held in Jalandhar, Punjab. Punjab won the title for the second time, beating Bengal 6–0 in the most one-sided Santosh Trophy final.

Inder Singh, the captain of Punjab, scored 23 goals, the record for a single tournament. Surajit Sengupta and Mohammad Akbar of Bengal scored eleven goals each. Punjab's previous title had also come at Jalandhar in the 1970-71 tournament.

== Preliminary round ==
=== Cluster A ===
| Pos | Team | Pld | W | D | L | GF | GA | GD | Pts | Qualification |
|---|---|---|---|---|---|---|---|---|---|---|
| 1 | Punjab | 2 | 2 | 0 | 0 | 22 | 0 | +22 | 4 | Advance to Quarter-finals |
| 2 | Uttar Pradesh | 2 | 0 | 1 | 1 | 2 | 7 | −5 | 1 | |
| 3 | Gujarat | 2 | 0 | 1 | 1 | 2 | 19 | −17 | 1 | |

Source: Sportsweek

| Punjab | 17–0 | Gujarat |
|---|---|---|
| Inder Singh |

Jalandhar, Punjab

| Punjab | 5–0 | Uttar Pradesh |

Jalandhar, Punjab

| Uttar Pradesh | 2–2 | Gujarat |

Jalandhar, Punjab

Punjab's seventeen goals against Gujarat is the second most scored in a Santosh Trophy match, after Bengal's 18–0 against Tripura in this season. Inder Singh's seven goals equalled the record of Fred Pugsley in 1945-46. Punjab was managed by Jarnail Singh.

=== Cluster B ===
| Pos | Team | Pld | W | D | L | GF | GA | GD | Pts | Qualification |
|---|---|---|---|---|---|---|---|---|---|---|
| 1 | Rajasthan | 2 | 1 | 1 | 0 | 3 | 0 | +3 | 3 | Advance to Quarter-finals |
| 2 | Tamil Nadu | 2 | 1 | 0 | 1 | 1 | 3 | −2 | 2 | |
| 3 | Delhi | 2 | 0 | 1 | 1 | 0 | 1 | −1 | 1 | |

Source: Sportsweek

| Rajasthan | 0–0 | Delhi |

Jalandhar, Punjab

| Rajasthan | 3–0 | Tamil Nadu |
|---|---|---|
| Magan Singh Rajvi |

Jalandhar, Punjab

| Tamil Nadu | 1–0 | Delhi |

Jalandhar, Punjab

Magan Singh, who scored the first hat-trick of this high-scoring tournament, was the Rajasthan captain.

=== Cluster C ===
| Pos | Team | Pld | W | D | L | GF | GA | GD | Pts | Qualification |
|---|---|---|---|---|---|---|---|---|---|---|
| 1 | Goa | 2 | 1 | 1 | 0 | 6 | 1 | +5 | 3 | Advance to Quarter-finals |
| 2 | Services | 2 | 0 | 2 | 0 | 1 | 1 | 0 | 2 | |
| 3 | Jammu and Kashmir | 2 | 0 | 1 | 1 | 0 | 5 | −5 | 1 | |

Source: Sportsweek

| Goa | 1–1 | Services |

Jalandhar, Punjab

| Goa | 5–0 | Jammu and Kashmir |

Jalandhar, Punjab

| Services | 0–0 | Jammu and Kashmir |

Jalandhar, Punjab

Goa was managed by Peter Thangaraj. This tournament was the debut of the Goa goal-keeper Brahmanand who would later captain India. Henry Britto captained Goa.

=== Cluster D ===
| Pos | Team | Pld | W | D | L | GF | GA | GD | Pts | Qualification |
|---|---|---|---|---|---|---|---|---|---|---|
| 1 | Maharashtra | 2 | 2 | 0 | 0 | 7 | 1 | +6 | 4 | Advance to Quarter-finals |
| 2 | Orissa | 2 | 0 | 1 | 1 | 2 | 5 | −3 | 1 | |
| 3 | Haryana | 2 | 0 | 1 | 1 | 1 | 4 | −3 | 1 | |

Source: Sportsweek

| Maharashtra | 3–0 | Haryana |

Jalandhar, Punjab

| Maharashtra | 4–1 | Orissa |

Jalandhar, Punjab

| Haryana | 1–1 | Orissa |

Jalandhar, Punjab

=== Cluster E ===
| Pos | Team | Pld | W | D | L | GF | GA | GD | Pts | Qualification |
|---|---|---|---|---|---|---|---|---|---|---|
| 1 | Bengal | 2 | 2 | 0 | 0 | 26 | 0 | +26 | 4 | Advance to Quarter-finals |
| 2 | Madhya Pradesh | 2 | 1 | 0 | 1 | 3 | 9 | −6 | 2 | |
| 3 | Tripura | 2 | 0 | 0 | 2 | 1 | 21 | −20 | 0 | |

Source: Sportsweek

| Bengal | 18–0 | Tripura |

Jalandhar, Punjab

| Bengal | 8–0 | Madhya Pradesh |

Jalandhar, Punjab

| Madhya Pradesh | 3–1 | Tripura |

Jalandhar, Punjab

Bengal had a forward line of Mohammad Akbar, Surajit Sengupta, Latifuddin and Pradeep Dutt. Bengal were without the prominent players Gautam Sarkar, Subhash Bhowmick, Sudhir Karmakar and Samaresh Chowdhury who were not selected as they failed to report for training before the team selection. Ashoklal Banerjee captained the team.

Bengal's 18–0 win against Tripura is a record in Santosh Trophy.

=== Cluster F ===
| Pos | Team | Pld | W | D | L | GF | GA | GD | Pts | Qualification |
|---|---|---|---|---|---|---|---|---|---|---|
| 1 | Assam | 2 | 2 | 0 | 0 | 5 | 1 | +4 | 4 | Advance to Quarter-finals |
| 2 | Kerala | 2 | 1 | 0 | 1 | 6 | 2 | +4 | 2 | |
| 3 | Himachal Pradesh | 2 | 0 | 0 | 2 | 2 | 10 | −8 | 0 | |

Source: Sportsweek

| Kerala | 6–1 | Himachal Pradesh |

Jalandhar, Punjab

| Assam | 4–1 | Himachal Pradesh |

Jalandhar, Punjab

| Assam | 1–0 | Kerala |
|---|---|---|
| Gilbertson Sangma |

Jalandhar, Punjab

The defending champions Kerala needed a draw in the last game but lost to Assam. This was the first appearance of Himachal Pradesh in the Santosh Trophy.

=== Cluster G ===
| Pos | Team | Pld | W | D | L | GF | GA | GD | Pts | Qualification |
|---|---|---|---|---|---|---|---|---|---|---|
| 1 | Nagaland | 2 | 1 | 1 | 0 | 4 | 3 | +1 | 3 | Advance to Quarter-finals |
| 2 | Railways | 2 | 1 | 0 | 1 | 3 | 3 | 0 | 2 | |
| 3 | Andhra Pradesh | 2 | 0 | 1 | 1 | 3 | 4 | −1 | 1 | |

Source: Sportsweek

| Railways | 2–1 | Andhra Pradesh |

Jalandhar, Punjab

| Nagaland | 2–1 | Railways |

Jalandhar, Punjab

| Nagaland | 2–2 | Andhra Pradesh |

Jalandhar, Punjab

Nagaland were making their debut in Santosh Trophy. They were coached by the former Olympian S. Raman. Railways were the finalists in the previous season but lost their second match.

=== Cluster H ===
| Pos | Team | Pld | W | D | L | GF | GA | GD | Pts | Qualification |
|---|---|---|---|---|---|---|---|---|---|---|
| 1 | Karnataka | 2 | 2 | 0 | 0 | 7 | 1 | +6 | 4 | Advance to Quarter-finals |
| 2 | Manipur | 2 | 1 | 0 | 1 | 4 | 3 | +1 | 2 | |
| 3 | Bihar | 2 | 0 | 0 | 2 | 2 | 6 | −4 | 0 | |

Source: Sportsweek

== Quarter-final league ==
| Pos | Team | Pld | W | D | L | GF | GA | GD | Pts | Qualification |
|---|---|---|---|---|---|---|---|---|---|---|
| 1 | Punjab | 3 | 2 | 1 | 0 | 0 | 0 | 0 | 5 | Advance to Semi-finals |
| 2 | Goa | 3 | 2 | 1 | 0 | 0 | 0 | 0 | 5 | Advance to Semi-finals |
| 3 | Maharashtra | 3 | 1 | 0 | 2 | 0 | 0 | 0 | 2 | |
| 4 | Rajasthan | 3 | 0 | 0 | 3 | 0 | 0 | 0 | 0 | |

Source: Sportsweek

| Punjab | 0–0 | Goa |

Jalandhar, Punjab

| Punjab | 4–0 | Maharashtra |

Jalandhar, Punjab

| Punjab | 12–x | Rajasthan |
|---|---|---|
| Inder Singh |

Jalandhar, Punjab

| Goa | 4–1 | Rajasthan |

Jalandhar, Punjab

| Maharashtra | 4–1 | Rajasthan |

Jalandhar, Punjab

| Pos | Team | Pld | W | D | L | GF | GA | GD | Pts | Qualification |
|---|---|---|---|---|---|---|---|---|---|---|
| 1 | Bengal | 3 | 3 | 0 | 0 | 0 | 0 | 0 | 6 | Advance to Semi-finals |
| 2 | Karnataka | 3 | 2 | 0 | 1 | 0 | 0 | 0 | 4 | Advance to Semi-finals |
| 3 | Nagaland | 0 | 0 | 0 | 0 | 0 | 0 | 0 | 0 | |
| 4 | Assam | 0 | 0 | 0 | 0 | 0 | 0 | 0 | 0 | |

Source: Sportsweek

| Bengal | 2–1 | Karnataka |

Jalandhar, Punjab

| Bengal | 4–0 | Nagaland |

Jalandhar, Punjab

| Karnataka | 4–1 | Nagaland |

Jalandhar, Punjab

== Semi-final ==
| Punjab | 2–0 | Karnataka |
|---|---|---|
| Inder Singh |

Jalandhar, Punjab

| Bengal | 2–1 | Goa |

Jalandhar, Punjab

== Final ==
| Punjab | 6–0 | Bengal |
|---|---|---|
| Inder Singh |

Guru Gobind Singh Stadium, Jalandhar, Punjab
Referee: J. P. Coutinho
