= 1945–46 Santosh Trophy =

National Football Championship

Tournament details
- Country: India
- Dates: 30 September – 11 October 1945
- Teams: 10

Final positions
- Champions: Bengal (2nd title)
- Runners-up: Bombay

Tournament statistics
- Matches played: 9
- Goals scored: 31 (3.44 per match)
- Top goal scorer: Fred Pugsley (9 goals)
- 60 minute matches

The 1945–46 Santosh Trophy was the third edition of the Santosh Trophy, the main State competition for football in India. It was held in Bombay. Bengal defeated Bombay 2–0 in the final.

Fred Pugsley, an Anglo-Burmese footballer who had moved to India temporarily during the war, scored seven goals in Bengal's win over Rajputana. This is a record in Santosh Trophy that was later equalled by Inder Singh in 1974-75 Jalandhar nationals.

Western India Football Association (WIFA) renamed itself as Bombay just before the tournament.

== Matches ==
30 September 1945

Delhi	2–1	Madras
Rammohan Rao 5' (o.g.); Rabbani 8'		Arnikandasami 3'

Cooperage Ground, Bombay
Referee: S.C. Ghosh
1 October 1945

Mysore	1–0	United Provinces
Ahmed 7'

Cooperage Ground, Bombay
Referee: Jayram
2 October 1945

Bombay	4–0	N.W.I.F.A
Arnold 25'; Tipple 27'; Cocklin 51'		Yahya Jan (red card) 45'

Cooperage Ground, Bombay
Referee: Atkinson

4 October 1945

Bengal	7–0	Rajputana
Pugsley

Cooperage Ground, Bombay
Referee: Atkinson

Bengal led by five goals at half-time. The tournament schedule was adjusted because Bengal arrived a day late.

6 October 1945

Hyderabad	1–0	Mysore
Mahmood 22'

Cooperage Ground, Bombay
Attendance: 6500
Referee: Gopalan

Moin of Hyderabad was sent off 13 minutes from the end.

7 October 1945

Bombay	3–0	Dacca
Cocklin 47'; Tipple 50'

Cooperage Ground, Bombay
Attendance: 6500
Referee: S.C.Ghosh

== Semifinal ==
8 October 1945

Bengal	5–0	Hyderabad
Ghosh; Pugsley; S. Nandy; Apparao

Referee: Gopalan
9 October 1945

Bombay	3–2	Delhi
Thomas 24' 41'; Dhakuram 30'		Yusuf 32'; Roshan Ali 37'

Cooperage Ground, Bombay
Referee: S.C. Ghosh

Bombay led 2–0 at half time. Center-forward Cocklin was unavailable for Bombay as he had left for England the previous night.

== Final ==
11 October 1945

Bengal	2–0	Bombay
Rabi Das 5'; S. Nandy

Cooperage Ground, Bombay
Attendance: 8000
Referee: Atkinson

Bengal scored their goals in the 5th minute of both halves. Das scored from a cross by Pugsley. Nandy was assisted by S. Ghosh in the second goal. The trophy was presented by Justice Kama.

== Squads ==
- Bengal : Ismail; S Das and Taj Mohammad; D. Chandra, T. Ao and Mahabir Prasad; Rabi Das, Apparao, Pugsley, S. Ghosh and S. Nandy (captain). Also : D. Sen, P. Chakroborty, D. Paul, A. Dey, Alauddin, A. Mozumdar.
- Bombay : Sanjiva; D.M. Mandon (captain) and Papen; Arnold, Robinson and Govind; Vandockum, Tipple, Cocklin, McCall and Dhakuram Also : Shetty, Murthy
- Delhi : Osman; S.M. Bhukari and Rahmat; Bashir, Afzal and S. A. Hashmi; Yusuf, Roshan Ali, Buland Akhtar, Atma Ram and M.P. Khan. Also : Mahmud (defender), Hasan (mid), Habib, Rabbani, M. Faiyaz (forwards)
- Dacca : G. Burton; D. Dutta and Shaheb Ali; H. Mitra, S. Guha and R. Sen; S. Bose, A. Roy, P. Mukerjee, A. Rachia and A. Das Also : B. Bose, R. Talukdar, C. Bose, Bailey, S. Sen.
- Hyderabad : Eeriah; Sher Khan and Fruvall (captain); Hadi, Jamal and Noor; S Susay, A Susay, Shamsher, Azeem and Mahmood. Also Moin
- N.W.I.F.A : Yaqub, Hughes, Nasir, Ibrar Hussain Bali, Saeed Mirza, Yahya Jan, Ghulam Muhammad, Arshad, Zakria, Akbar Jan, Gilbert, Abdul Rahim, Ata (Note: full name, Ataullah), Amjad, Hussain Ali, Munir.
- Mysore : Basha; Palladi and Jayram (captain); Baseer, S. Mohiuddin and Sumugan; Borolingiah, Karim, Nanjundiah, Ahmed and Raman; Also : Shanmugam, Sampangi
- United Provinces : Arthur; Kazim and Rajaram; Wajihul, Aziz and Mahabir; Kullu, Abid, Furhat, Mahmud and Qader
- Madras : S. Moni; Rammohan Rao and K. Mani; A. D. Parthasarathy, Jaganathan and Murugesan; Arnikandasami, Ganesan, Vishwesara Rao, Hanumantha Rao and Thangaraj

The day after the final, a match was played between All India and Europeans.

- Indian XI : Osman (Delhi); Taj Mohammad, and Papen (Bombay); Shanmugham (Mysore), T. Ao (Bengal) and Mahabir Prasad (Bengal); S. Nandy (Bengal), Apparao (Bengal), Rabi Das (Bengal), Raman (Mysore) and Dhakuram (Bombay)

Reserves : Ismail (Bengal), S. Das (Bengal), D. Chandra (Bengal), A. Rudra (Dacca) and Thomas (Bombay)

- Europeans : Lambert (CMP), Hamilton (Navy) and Tipple (RAF) and Arnold (Navy), Robinson (Embarkation Headquarters (EHQ)) and Airog (Navy); Shanks (RAF), Gallacher (CMP), Cocklin (Navy), McCall (EHQ) and Sutton (CMP)
