= 1944–45 Santosh Trophy =

National Football Championship

Tournament details
- Country: India

Final positions
- Champions: Delhi (1st title)
- Runners-up: Bengal
- 60 minute matches

The 1944–45 Santosh Trophy was the second edition of the Santosh Trophy, the main State competition for football in India. It was resumed in 1944 after a break of two years. Delhi defeated the defending champions Bengal in the final.

Like the previous tournament, the regional matches were played across India.

== Preliminary Matches ==
21 August 1944

| United Provinces | 5–3 | Bihar |

Kanpur
24 August 1944

| Delhi | 3–2 replay | United Provinces |

New Delhi
28 August 1944

| Hyderabad | 4–2 | Madras |
|---|---|---|
| Moin; Sussay | | John Joseph; Jayaraman |

Sullivan Sports Ground, Bangalore
30 August 1944

| Mysore | 2–1 (a.e.t.) | Hyderabad |
|---|---|---|
| Raman |

Sullivan Sports Ground, Bangalore

Raman scored the winning goal in the extra time. This was the South Zone final and Mysore qualified to meet Bengal in the national semifinal. The match was attended by a crowd of twenty thousand.

27 August 1944

| Bengal | 2–0 | Dacca |
|---|---|---|
| Bimal Kar |

Dacca Sports Association Ground, Dacca
Referee: A Das Gupta

== Semi-final ==
According to the original schedule, the Mysore-Bengal semifinal was scheduled to be held in Calcutta on September 16 and final at Delhi on September 21. Mysore failed to turn up and the semifinal was postponed to September 28 and final to October 1. Mysore again failed to appear on the new date and asked for a postponement for 10 days. Bengal was given a walk-over.

== Final ==
1 October 1944

| Delhi | 2–0 | Bengal |

Irwin Stadium, New Delhi
Attendance: 15,000

Sir Claude Auchinleck, the Commander-in-Chief of India, gave away the prizes.

== Squads ==
- Hyderabad : Ferayya; Fruvall (captain) and Sher Khan; Muhammad Noor, Sheikjamal and Hadi; Mohammadali, Syed Hafizali, Shamsheed Khan, Sussay and Khaja Moin
- Madras : Hussain; Rammohan Rao and Ranga Rao; Murugesan, Kothandan and Paul; Appalmurthi, Jayaraman, John Joseph, Narayana and Ayyadurai
- Mysore : Basha, Rodgers, Jayaram, Henderson, Mohiuddin, Shanmugam, Karim, Tomkins, Somanna, Duncan, Raman, Nanjunda, Antony, Basheer, Chinnaswamy
- Dacca: Marshall; A Mukherjee; Shaheb Ali; Shubal Pal; Reynolds; Onahoy; Horn; Alom; Dutch; A Das; Abbas

The name of the Hyderabad goal keeper appears as Eeriah in the reports of 1945-46. The spellings Sussay, Susay and Susai are used for the Hyderabad forward.
