= 1945 IFA Shield final =

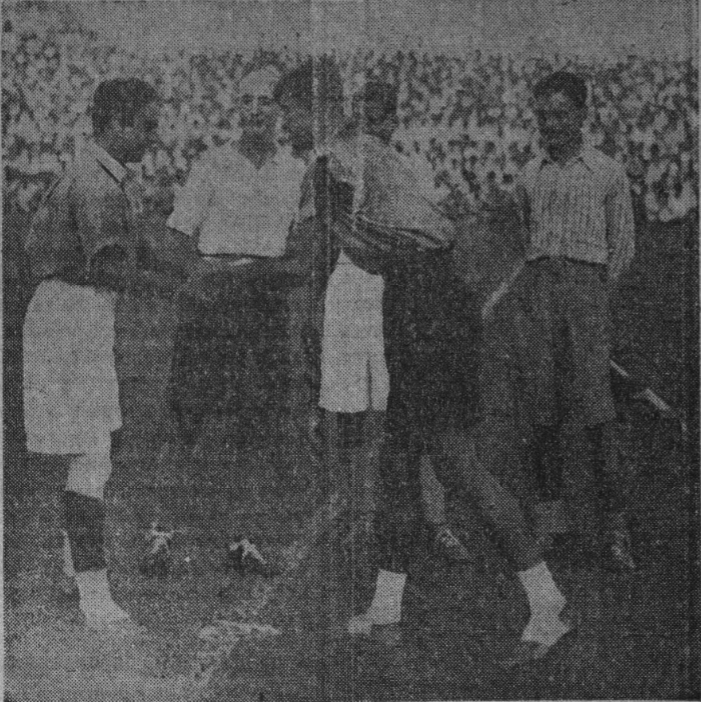
- East Bengal captain Paritosh Chakravarti and Mohun Bagan captain Anil Dey before the start of the match
- Event: 1945 IFA Shield
| East Bengal | Mohun Bagan |
| 1 | 0 |
- Date: 9 August 1945
- Venue: Calcutta Ground, Kolkata, West Bengal
- Referee: Segt. McBride

The 1945 IFA Shield final was the 53rd final of the IFA Shield, the second oldest football competition in India, and was contested between Kolkata giants East Bengal and Mohun Bagan on 9 August 1945 at the Calcutta Ground in Kolkata.

East Bengal won the final 1–0 to claim their 2nd IFA Shield title. Fred Pugsley scored the only goal of the match in the second half as East Bengal lifted their second IFA Shield title.

== Route to the final ==
| East Bengal | | Round | Mohun Bagan | |
|---|---|---|---|---|
| Opponent | Result | Round | Opponent | Result |
| Barisal F.A. | 2–0 | Second Round | B & A Railway | 2–0 |
| Hyderabad Police | 2–0 | Third Round | Wari Club Dhaka | 1–0 |
| Bogra Town | 3–1 | Quarter–Final | Bhawanipore | 2–0 |
| Kalighat | 2–1 | Semi–Final | Calcutta F.C. | 1–0 |

== Match ==
=== Summary ===
The IFA Shield final began at the Calcutta Ground in Kolkata on 9 August 1945 in front of a packed crowd as Kolkata giants East Bengal and Mohun Bagan faced each other in a Kolkata Derby for the first time ever in a major tournament final. East Bengal reached their fourth consecutive final, having lost the previous one to Eastern Bengal Railway in 1944. Mohun Bagan also made their fourth appearance in the final after having lost the previous two in 1923 and 1940, being champions in 1911, after they defeated Calcutta F.C. 1–0 in the semi-final.

East Bengal however, were dominant from the start as they created multiple scoring opportunities with their forward line consisting of Fred Pugsley, Appa Rao, Sunil Ghosh, Swami Nayar, and T. Kar constantly creating pressure on the Mohun Bagan defense. The Mohun Bagan custodian D. Sen made a few excellent saves to keep them in the match however, it was in the sixteenth minute of the second half when a powerful attempt by Sunil Ghosh got deflected of a defender and fell onto the feet of Pugsley, who scored with a powerful right footed shot to make in 1–0. Mohun Bagan did get a few chances in the dying minutes of the match but East Bengal goalkeeper A. Mukherjee managed to keep a clean sheet as East Bengal lifted their second IFA Shield title.

=== Details ===
9 August 1945
14:00 IST

| East Bengal | 1–0 | Mohun Bagan |
|---|---|---|
| Pugsley 41' |

Calcutta Ground, Kolkata
Attendance: 30,000 (est.)
Referee: Segt. McBride

| East Bengal | Mohun Bagan |

| GK | (British Raj) Amitabha Mukherjee |
| CB | (British Raj) N. Guha |
| CB | (British Raj) Paritosh Chakravarti (c) |
| CM | (British Raj) Dhirendranath Chanda |
| CM | (British Raj) S. M. Kaiser |
| CM | (British Raj) Mohabir Prasad |
| FW | (British Raj) Titu Kar |
| FW | (British Raj) M. Apparao |
| FW | (British rule in Burma) Fred Pugsley |
| FW | (British Raj) Sunil Ghosh |
| FW | (British Raj) Swami Nayar |

| GK | (British Raj) Dwipen Sen |
| CB | (British Raj) Sarat Das |
| CB | (British Raj) Sailen Manna |
| CM | (British Raj) Anil Dey (c) |
| CM | (British Raj) Talimeren Ao |
| CM | (British Raj) Dwipen Sen |
| FW | (British Raj) Nirmal Chatterjee |
| FW | (British Raj) Butchi |
| FW | (British Raj) Bijon Bose |
| FW | (British Raj) Nimu Bose |
| FW | (British Raj) Nirmal Mukherjee |

Match rules

- 50 minutes.
- Joint winners if both finals ends in a draw
