= Akshay Das =

Indian coach and footballer (born 1977)

Personal information
- Full name: Akshay Das
- Date of birth: 4 January 1977 (age 49)
- Place of birth: Sabalpur, Cuttack, Odisha, India
- Position: Defender

Team information
- Current team: Odisha (head coach)

Youth career
- Yazdani Club-73

Senior career*
Years	Team	Apps	(Gls)
–	Sunrise Club		
1998–1999	SAIL FC		
1999–2001	East Bengal		
2001–2002	Salgaocar		
2002–2003	ITI Bangalore		
2003–2004	Sporting Clube de Goa		
2004–2005	East Bengal		
2005–2006	Eveready		
2006–2007	Calcutta Port Trust		
2007	Mohammedan		
2007–2008	Viva Kerala		

International career
1999–2000	India U19		

Managerial career
- 2013–2014: Odisha (assistant)
- 2014–2015: Odisha
- 2015–: Tata FA (coach)
- 2019–: Jamshedpur U17 (coach)
- 2023–: Odisha
- * Club domestic league appearances and goals

Akshay Das (born 4 January 1977) is an Indian football coach and former footballer who played as a midfielder. He is currently the head coach of the Odisha football team. He has also represented India at the youth level internationally.

== Club career ==
Das represented local clubs in Odisha before playing for SAIL club in the Calcutta Football League. Das later went to play for the major Kolkata club East Bengal for the two seasons from 1999 till 2001 and later returned to play during the 2004 season. He won the Durand Cup in the 2004 edition for East Bengal which defeated their rivals Mohun Bagan in the final.

He has also played for major clubs like Salgaocar and Sporting Clube de Goa in the Goa league and has also played for Eveready SC and Mohammedan SC.

Das represented the state team of Odisha in the Santosh Trophy in the 2004, 2005 and 2008 editions.

== International career ==
Das was selected for the Indian youth team that toured Mauritius in 1999. He represented the Indian U19 team at the 2000 AFC Youth Championship qualifiers held at Sri Lanka in 2000.

== Coaching career ==
Das was appointed the assistant coach of the Odisha team for the 2013–14 Santosh Trophy season and served under the head coach R. P. Singh. The following season, Das was appointed the head coach of the Odisha team for the 2014–15 Santosh Trophy. In 2023, he was re-appointed as the head coach of Odisha for the 2023–24 Santosh Trophy.

He is serving as the senior coach of the Tata Football Academy and Jamshedpur FC Youth.

== Honours ==
East Bengal

- National Football League: 2000–01
- Durand Cup: 2004
- IFA Shield: 2000
- McDowell's Cup: 2000
