= Mahabir Prasad (footballer) =

Indian footballer

Personal information
- Date of birth: 1918
- Place of birth: Bihar, Bihar and Orissa Province, British India

Senior career*
Years	Team	Apps	(Gls)
–1946	East Bengal		
1946–1949	Mohun Bagan		
- Bengal

International career
- India
- * Club domestic league appearances and goals

Mahabir Prasad (born 1918, date of death unknown) was an Indian footballer. He represented India at men's tournament of the 1948 Summer Olympics in London.

== Honours ==
East Bengal

- IFA Shield: 1945

Bengal

- Santosh Trophy: 1945–46, 1947–48
