= Rabi Das =

Indian footballer (died 1998)

Personal information
- Full name: Rabi Bhusan Das
- Date of death: 21 April 1998
- Place of death: Calcutta, India

Senior career*
Years	Team	Apps	(Gls)
- Bhawanipore
- Mohun Bagan

International career
- India
- * Club domestic league appearances and goals

Rabi Bhusan Das (date of birth unknown, died 21 April 1998) was an Indian footballer. He competed in the men's tournament at the 1948 Summer Olympics.

== Honours ==
Mohun Bagan

- Durand Cup: 1953

Bengal

- Santosh Trophy: 1945–46, 1947–48, 1949–50, 1953–54
