= Talimeren Ao =

Indian footballer (1918–1998)

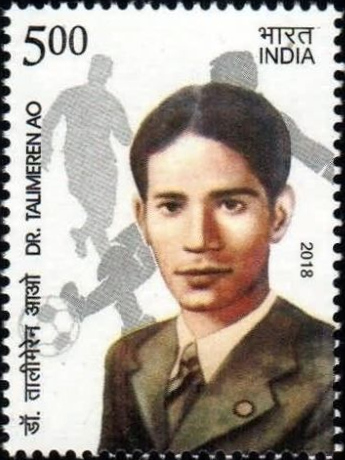
- Talimeren Ao on a 2018 stamp of India

Personal information
- Date of birth: 28 January 1918
- Place of birth: Changki, Naga Hills District, Assam Province, British India (now in Mokokchung district, Nagaland, India)
- Date of death: 13 September 1998 (aged 80)
- Place of death: Kohima, Nagaland, India
- Height: 5 ft 10 in (1.78 m)
- Position: Defender

Senior career*
Years	Team	Apps	(Gls)
- Maharana Club
1943–1952	Mohun Bagan		

International career
1948–1951	India	6	(0)
- * Club domestic league appearances and goals

Talimeren Ao (28 January 1918 – 13 September 1998) was an Indian footballer and physician from Nagaland. He is best known as the captain of the India national football team in their first ever match after independence. One of the most famous Nagas, he was a figurehead of India's football history, and his name is resonant in the collective memory of the people. He played domestic club football for Mohun Bagan.

== Early life ==
On 28 January 1918, Ao was born to Reverend Subongwati Ningdangri Ao and Maongsangla Changkilari in Changki village in the Naga Hills. He was their fourth child among 12.

Ao studied at Impur Christian School and was captain of the school team. In 1937, he was nominated as best footballer of All Assam Inter School Football Championship after winning the tournament with the team. He later joined Jorhat Christian Mission School and also captained its football team.

== Club career ==
=== Mohun Bagan ===
In 1943, Ao joined then Calcutta Football League club Mohun Bagan AC, who were then in the Calcutta Football League. He captained the Maroon and Green in 1948 and 1949, taking over from Sarat Das. Sarat Das was Ao's senior in Cotton College, and both of them had played for the Maharana Club of Guwahati, then most successful club of Assam. Ao was a striker in the Maharana Club but on joining Mohun Bagan he was positioned in the defence. In Mohun Bagan, Ao was centre-half and along with his two backs, they were popularly known as "the Great Wall of China". He was given the captain's armband in 1948 to captain the Indian Football Team in London. In 1950 Ao captained Bagan in the Durand Cup but lost to Hyderabad Police in the final 1–0. Ao told his son that in this Durand Cup (1950) the Mohun Bagan goalkeeper was injured and that he took over in his place. Ao's footballing talents were well-known and as such, caught the attention of various clubs from overseas, among which included the famed English club Arsenal F.C. Ao famously rejected a one-year contract from the club, choosing to continue with his studies; a decision which he never regretted in his later years.

=== Manipur ===
Ao also played for the Manipur football team in Santosh Trophy, captained the team in the 1950s, including exhibition matches in West Bengal.

== International career ==
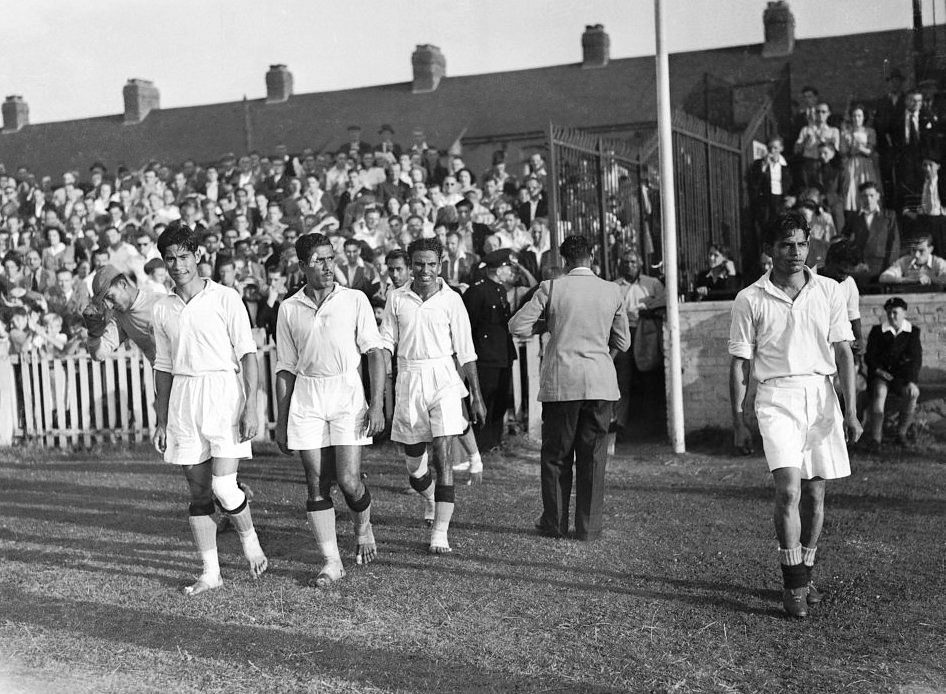
Talimeren Ao (left), leading India out at the Cricklefield Stadium to play against France in 1948

Well, you see, we play football in India, whereas you play bootball.

— Talimeren Ao, made the statement to the press after appearing with no shoes (wearing only thick socks and protective bandages) in India's match against France at the 1948 Summer Olympics in London.

In 1948, a year after India won its independence, Ao became captain of the India national football team. He was part of the national team that toured to Europe in 1948 and went on to defeat the Pinner F.C. 9–1 on 24 July, Hayes F.C. 4–1 on 26 July, and Alexandra Park FC 8–2 on 28 July. He led the team at the 1948 Summer Olympics in London, in their first official game and was flag-bearer of the Indian contingent. India was then managed by Balaidas Chatterjee. Their first match was against Burma but the game was a walkover. In India's second match against France, he played alongside Sailen Manna and Sheoo Mewalal, but the team lost 2–1, with the Indian goal coming from Sarangapani Raman. Under his captaincy, bare feet Indian players' bravery earned admiration of Princess Margaret of England. Ao played five more matches for India before retiring. He also went on to play few friendly matches in their Nederlands tour, where they went down to Sparta Rotterdam, but managed to win against Ajax Amsterdam.

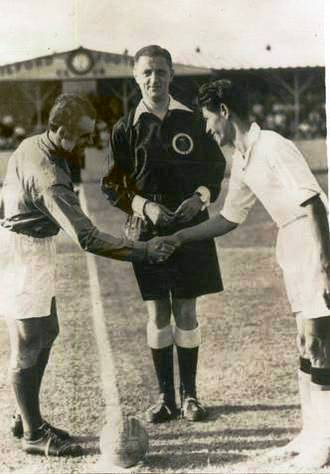
Ao (in right) shaking hands with French captain Gabriel Robert, in 1948 Summer Olympics.

He played for Syed Abdul Rahim managed India until 1951, but missed a golden opportunity to play in the biggest tournament on earth, as India had not gone to the 1950 FIFA World Cup in Brazil.

== Post-football career ==
Ao studied at R. G. Kar Medical College and Hospital in Kolkata, West Bengal. He earned MBBS degree from there, and in 1963, returned to Nagaland where he was given the post of Assistant Civil Surgeon. He later became Civil Surgeon. Ao went on to be appointed as Director of Health Services of the Government of Nagaland, from which he retired in 1978.

== Personal life ==
Under conventional Naga practice, Talimeren Ao's name could have read Subongwati Talimeren Ningdangri in full - father's name followed by son's name followed by clan. When Ao returned to home to Kohima as an assistant civil surgeon at the Civil Hospital in 1953, he met his future wife, Deikim Doungel, who was a staff nurse in the same hospital although she was 11 years younger. They got married and had two sons and two daughters. Their eldest child was a daughter, Ningsangenla Tally. She was followed by two sons Talikokchang "Akok"(b. 1958) and Indianoba(b. 1962) and again a daughter, Bendangmenchetla "Bendang", who became a badminton player and married her mixed-doubles partner.

== Death ==
Early in 1998, Ao contracted seasonal influenza. Being already fragile of health and a diabetic, it led to further complications and deterioration. He was transported from Dimapur to Kohima, hospitalised and finally died in the Naga Civil Hospital, where he first served as Civil Surgeon in the early 1960s. He died on 13 September 1998. He wished to be and was buried in the Naga Cemetery, Khermahal, Dimapur. He had two sons, two daughters and eight grandchildren. His wife Deikim Doungel, a staff nurse, also died in June 2018 at the age of 89.

== Legacy ==
Dr. Talimeren Ao’s life continues to inspire generations of Naga youth, not only for his footballing excellence but for his commitment to education and public service. His dual legacy as India’s first Olympic football captain and Nagaland’s first Director of Health Services remains unmatched. His story is often cited in schools and sports academies across the state as a model of discipline, humility, and excellence.

In his honour, the Government of Nagaland instituted the Dr. T Ao Trophy, an annual inter-district football tournament aimed at promoting grassroots talent. The 2025 edition saw participation from all 17 districts, with matches broadcast live on SportsCast India. Districts like Meluri and Noklak fielded teams for the first time, reflecting the growing reach of football in remote areas. The tournament has become a cornerstone of youth engagement and sports development in the state.

In 2023, the All India Football Federation (AIFF) renamed the Junior Girls National Football Championship as the "Dr. T Ao National Championship," further cementing his legacy in Indian football. Nagaland Chief Minister Neiphiu Rio remarked, “When he could do it four decades ago, today—with all the facilities and support—I believe our youth can do it too. We must carry forward his legacy.” In 2002, Mohun Bagan Athletic Club honoured him by creating the Mohun Bagan Ratna Award and giving him a life membership. In Assam, an outdoor stadium at Kaliabor and an indoor stadium at Cotton College have been named after him. In 2003, 'Dr. T. Ao NorthEast Football Trophy' was incepted in honour of him, to promote the development of football in the North-East.

In 2009, Union Minister for Mines, Bijoy Krishna Handique, inaugurated the first Dr. Talimeren Ao Football Trophy at the DDSC Stadium in Dimapur, Nagaland, to encourage and challenge the North-East Youth to excel in both sports and academics. In 2012, Government of Nagaland instituted Dr. T. Ao Awards in memory of him, and Naga archer Chekrovolü Swüro became the first one to receive it. In January 2018, a year-long celebration of the 100th birth anniversary of Ao was inaugurated at the Raj Bhavan in Kohima by the Nagaland Governor Padmanabha Acharya. In his memory, "T. Ao Inter District Football Tournament" was unveiled in Nagaland, by the Nagaland Football Association (NFA). In 2018, laying of foundation ston of both the Dr. T. Ao Sports Academy and Dr. T. Ao Stadium began.

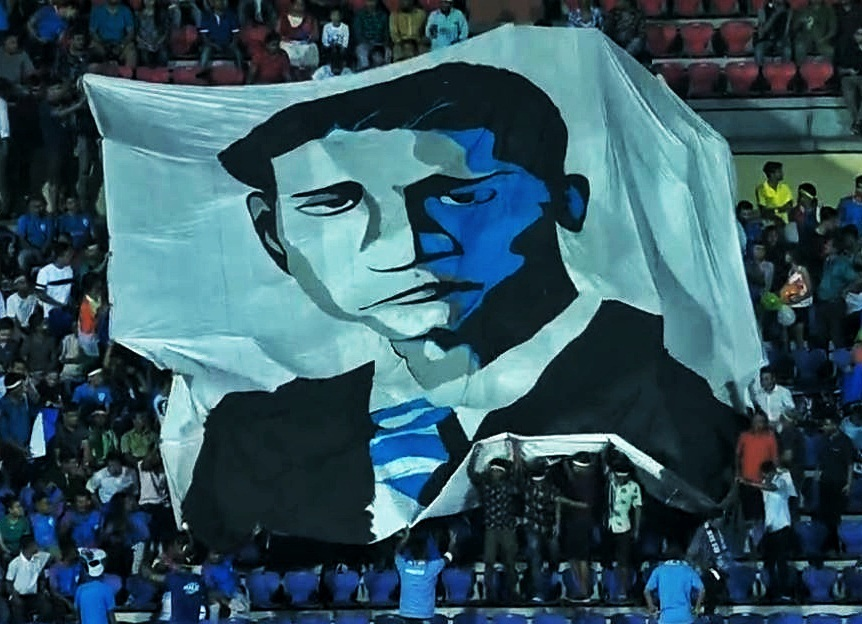
Blue Pilgrims' with the large tifo of Talimeren Ao during India's World Cup qualifying match against Oman at the Sarusajai Stadium in Guwahati, 2020.

In 2018, India Post issued a ₹5 commemorative postage stamp of Ao, the second Indian footballer honoured with a postage stamp after Gostha Pal in 1998.

== Reflections on Modern Challenges ==
Despite the reverence for Dr. Ao’s legacy, questions persist about the absence of similarly iconic figures from Nagaland in recent decades. Community leaders and sports historians point to challenges such as limited sports infrastructure, lack of sustained mentorship, and socio-economic pressures that divert youth from pursuing dual careers in sports and academics. While initiatives like the Dr. T Ao Trophy and government scholarships aim to bridge this gap, the journey to produce another Dr. T Ao remains a collective aspiration.

Some scholars argue that Ao’s success was shaped not only by personal discipline but by a unique confluence of opportunity, education, and national visibility—factors that remain elusive for many aspiring athletes from the region today.

== Honours ==
Mohun Bagan

- IFA Shield: 1952
- Calcutta Football League: 1943, 1944, 1951
- Trades Cup: 1944, 1945, 1949
- Cooch Behar Cup: 1944, 1948, 1949

Bengal

- Santosh Trophy: 1945–46, 1947–48

Individual

- University of Calcutta Athletic Meet individual championship trophy: 1946–47
- Mohun Bagan Ratna Award: 2002

== See also ==
- Naga people
- History of the India national football team
- List of India national football team captains
- India national football team at the Olympics
- History of Indian football

== Bibliography ==
- Kapadia, Novy (2017). Barefoot to Boots: The Many Lives of Indian Football. Penguin Random House. ISBN 978-0-143-42641-7.
- Martinez, Dolores; Mukharjiim, Projit B (2009). Football: From England to the World: The Many Lives of Indian Football. Routledge. ISBN 978-1-138-88353-6. Archived from the original on 2 July 2022.
- Nath, Nirmal (2011). History of Indian Football: Upto 2009–10. Readers Service. ISBN 9788187891963. Archived from the original on 22 July 2022.
- Dineo, Paul; Mills, James (2001). Soccer in South Asia: Empire, Nation, Diaspora. London, United Kingdom: Frank Cass Publishers. ISBN 978-0-7146-8170-2. Archived from the original on 25 July 2022.
- Majumdar, Boria; Bandyopadhyay, Kausik (2006). Goalless: The Story of a Unique Footballing Nation. Penguin India. ISBN 9780670058747.
- Majumdar, Boria; Bandyopadhyay, Kausik (2006). A Social History Of Indian Football: Striving To Score. Routledge. ISBN 9780415348355. Archived from the original on 29 June 2021.
- Basu, Jaydeep (2003). Stories from Indian Football. UBS Publishers' Distributors. ISBN 9788174764546. Archived from the original on 11 October 2022.
- Mukhopadhay, Subir (2018). সোনায় লেখা ইতিহাসে মোহনবাগান (transl. Mohun Bagan in the history written in gold). ISBN 978-93-850172-0-9.
- Banerjee, Argha; Basu, Rupak (2022). মোহনবাগান: সবুজ ঘাসের মেরুন গল্প (transl. Mohun Bagan: Green fields' Maroon stories). Shalidhan. ISBN 978-81-954667-0-2.
- Shreekumar, S. S. (15 August 2020). THE BEST WAY FORWARD FOR INDIA'S FOOTBALL. HSRA Publications. p. 244. ISBN 9788194721697. Archived from the original on 4 February 2023.

Olympic Games
Preceded by Dhyan Chand	Flagbearer for India; London 1948	Succeeded by Balbir Singh Sr.
