= Ibrar Hussain Bali =

Pakistani former footballer

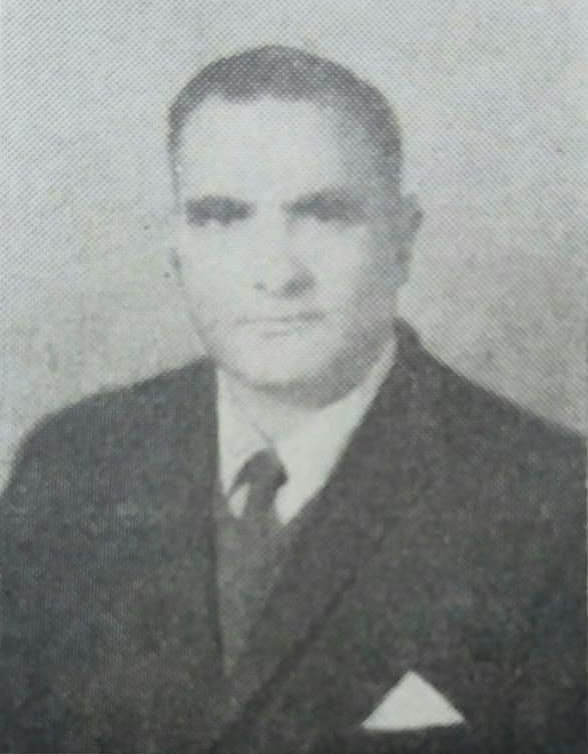
- Bali post-retirement

Personal information
- Full name: Ibrar Hussain Bali
- Date of birth: Unknown
- Place of birth: North-West Frontier Province, British India
- Date of death: Unknown
- Position: Defender

Youth career
- Punjab University

Senior career*
| Years | Team | Apps | (Gls) |
| 1944–1949 | Bata | | |
| 1954–1955 | Mohammedan | | |

International career
| 1952–1956 | Pakistan | | |
- * Club domestic league appearances and goals

Ibrar Hussain Bali (Urdu: ابرار حسین بالی) was a Pakistani footballer who played as a defender. Bali represented the Pakistan national football team during the early 1950s.

== Club career ==
Bali played for the Punjab University football team in the 1940s, and also captained the team in 1948. He also played for Bata Sports Club at the Lahore District Football League. Bali also represented the NWIFA at the 1945–46 Santosh Trophy.

He then played for Peshawar based clubs and represented the NWFP football team at the National Football Championship.

Bali also featured for Calcutta Football League side Mohammedan Sporting in the 1950s.

== International career ==
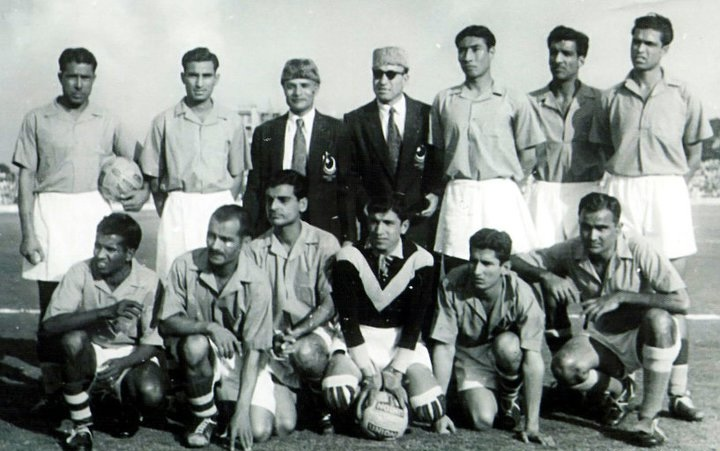
Bali sitting far right with Pakistan in 1955

In 1952, Bali was among the players selected to represent the Pakistan national team for the 1952 Asian Quadrangular Football Tournament held in Colombo, Ceylon. The same year, he played a friendly match against Iran at Karachi.

In 1955, Bali was once again selected for the 1955 Asian Quadrangular Football Tournament which was held at Dacca (now Dhaka), East Pakistan (now Bangladesh). The following year, he toured with the national team for their 1956 far east tour to countries such as Ceylon, Singapore and China.

== Post-retirement ==
In 1970, Bali was appointed as a member of the PFF selection committee alongside Sheikh Shaheb Ali for the 1970 RCD Cup. He served as manager of the Pakistan national team at the 1986 Fajr International Tournament, with Younus Changezi as head coach.
