= Golak Samal =

Indian association footballer

Personal information
- Full name: Golak Samal
- Date of birth: c. 1920s
- Place of birth: Orissa, British India
- Date of death: 22 May 2008 (aged 81)
- Place of death: Cuttack
- Position: Forward

Senior career*
Years	Team	Apps	(Gls)
1946–1955	Orissa		

International career
1955	India		
- * Club domestic league appearances and goals

Golak Samal was an Indian former association football player and athlete, who played as a forward for Orissa and the India football team.

== Career ==
Samal represented the Orissa state in the Santosh Trophy for nearly ten years from 1946 till 1955. He was part of the team which reached the semi-finals of the Santosh Trophy for the first time in the 1950–51 edition held at Calcutta.

Samal also competed in athletics in 100m sprint, long jump and pole vault and won the pole vault national gold medal in 1948. He represented Orissa in national athletics championships from 1946 to 1962.

== International career ==
Samal was part of the India national squad that toured Afghanistan in 1955.

== Personal life ==
Samal worked as a football coach for the Sports Department of Government of Odisha. His son Erick Samal also represented the Orissa team. He received the Biju Patnaik Award for promotion of Sports in 2001.
