= Dacca football team =

Dacca
- Full name: Dacca football team
- Founded: 1941
- Dissolved: 1947
- Ground: Paltan Maidan, Dacca
- Owner: Dacca Sporting Association
- League: Santosh Trophy

The Dacca football team was an Indian domestic football team that represented the city of Dacca and the eastern region of Bengal Presidency in Indian state football competitions including the Santosh Trophy. The team played in the Santosh Trophy from 1944–45 season until 1945–46 season in India, before the partition of India.

== History ==
=== Origins of Dacca football ===
The Dacca Sporting Association (DSA) was formed in 1895 as an apex body for the control of sports in Dacca, and also played an important role in the spread of association football in eastern Bengal. The players from eastern Bengal played for the Calcutta-based clubs that participated in the Calcutta Football League and the Dacca-based clubs such as Wari Club, which participated in the IFA tournaments such as IFA Shield, Trades Cup etc. The players also represented the Bengal football team or IFA XI representative sides which was administered by the IFA for Bengal Presidency.

DSA representative sides also played friendly matches against other Indian and British sides. One such notable moment came in 1937, when DSA secured a victory against a visiting British side in 1937. They defeated Islington Corinthians 1–0, on 22 November 1937, with the goal scored by Pakhi Sen.

=== Provincial representation ===
The AIFF which was formed in 1937, then instituted the national football championship for inter-state football competition, which came to be known as the Santosh Trophy. Dacca became the provincial member under Dacca Sporting Association on 29 December 1938. The team was slated to participate in the inaugural Santosh Trophy in the 1941–42 season against Bengal football team, but withdrew. Bengal received a walkover as Dacca withdrew drew to communal riots, while the match was scheduled to be held in Dacca on 13 July. Dacca made its national debut in the Santosh Trophy in the 1944–45 season, when it played its first match but lost 2–0 against Bengal. In the 1945–46 season, it played against Bombay, but lost 3–0 in their last appearance at the national championships.

=== Successor ===
Following the independence and partition of India, the Dacca team became defunct as they could no longer participate in the national championships, as the region became a part of Pakistan as the province of East Bengal (later East Pakistan). The domestic league continued with the Dhaka Football League from 1948.

Eventually, players from Dacca would represent teams from East Pakistan in the Pakistan National Football Championship. In 1961, after the National Championship was made division-based, Dacca Division would win the tournament in both 1961–62 and 1962.

Eventually in 1971, Bangladesh became independent and the Bangladesh national football team played its first international match in 1973. In the same year, the Dhaka District football team would win the Bangladesh National Football Championship.

== Squads ==
The Dacca squad for the 1945–46 Santosh Trophy:

- G Burton; D. Dutta and Shaheb Ali; H Mitra, S Guha and R Sen; S Bose, A Roy, P Mukerjee, A Rachia, A Das, B. Bose, R. Talukdar, C. Bose, Bailey, S. Sen

The Dacca squad for the 1944–45 Santosh Trophy:

- Marshall; A Mukherjee; Shaheb Ali; Shubal Pal; Reynolds; Onahoy; Horn; Alom; Dutch; A Das; Abbas
