= Sailen Manna =

Indian footballer (1924–2012)

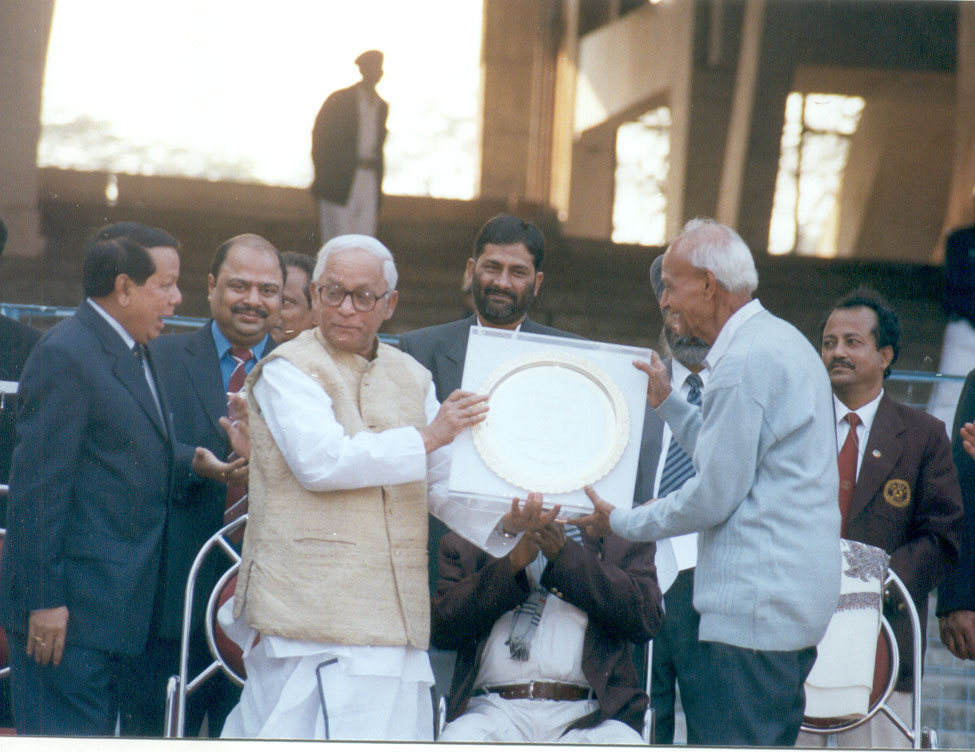
- Manna (right) being felicitated by Chief Minister Buddhadeb Bhattacharjee (left), 2006

Personal information
- Full name: Sailendra Nath Manna
- Date of birth: 1 September 1924
- Place of birth: Howrah, Bengal Presidency, British India
- Date of death: 27 February 2012 (aged 87)
- Place of death: Kolkata, West Bengal, India
- Position: Defender

Senior career*
Years	Team	Apps	(Gls)
1940–1942	Howrah Union		
1942–1960	Mohun Bagan	748	(46)

International career
1948–1956	India	14	(1)

Managerial career
- 1961: India
- 1968: India
Medal record
Men's football
Representing India
Asian Games
Gold medal – first place	1951 New Delhi	Team
- * Club domestic league appearances and goals

Sailendra Nath Manna (Bengali: শৈলেন মান্না; 1 September 1924 – 27 February 2012) was an Indian football player who represented the India national team between 1948 and 1956. Predominantly played as a left-back, Manna is considered as one of the best defenders the country has ever produced. He has represented and captained India in different international competitions, including the Olympics and Asian Games. In 1971 Manna was awarded with Padma Shri by Government of India.

In club football Manna has represented Mohun Bagan, one of the oldest clubs in India, for a continuous period of 19 years. He was conferred with the inaugural Mohun Bagan Ratna award in 2001. Manna was the only Asian footballer to be named among the ten best Captains in the world by the English FA in 1953.

== Early life ==
Sailendra Nath Manna was born in a Mahishya family in Byantra, Howrah at his maternal home. His mother's name was Gouri Devi, and father was Fanindra Nath Manna, who had ancestral house in Ramnathpur, Hooghly. Manna later shifted to Bidhannagar FD block.

Manna graduated from the Surendranath College, an affiliated college of the University of Calcutta. He worked for the Geological Survey of India.

== Club career ==
Manna started his playing career with Howrah Union, then a club in the second Division of the Kolkata Football League, in 1940. After turning out for the club for a couple of seasons, he joined Mohun Bagan in 1942 and continued playing for the club till his retirement in 1960. Between 1950 and 1955, he featured as the club's captain. During his 19-year association with the club as player, he reportedly earned only ₹19. Speaking to Sportstar in 2006, he reasoned that he "played out of love for the sport and was happy with the salary I got from my employer, the Geological Survey of India."

As a defender, Manna was known for his anticipation, covering and a strong free kick. He also represented Bengal football team in Santosh Trophy and played alongside Sheoo Mewalal, winning the tournament in 1953–54 season defeating Mysore 3–1 in final. He was also part of Bengal's multiple Santosh Trophy wins under coaching of Balaidas Chatterjee.

== International career ==
Manna was part of the India national team managed by Balaidas Chatterjee that participated at the 1948 Summer Olympics in London. He went to Europe with the national team in July to play preparatory matches against English teams like Pinner F.C., Hayes F.C. and Alexandra Park FC before the main tournament. In the Olympics, their first match was against Burma, and it was a walkover. Then, they played their one and only match against France, and was defeated by a margin of 1–2 with Indian goal coming from Sarangapani Raman. Manna played in the tournament in bare feet; their bravery earned admiration of Princess Margaret of England. With India, he later went on to play few friendly matches with captain Talimeren Ao in their Nederlands tour, where they went down to Sparta Rotterdam but won 5–1 against Ajax Amsterdam.

Under his captaincy, India won the gold medal in the 1951 Asian Games, and also won the Asian Quadrangular Football Tournament for four consecutive years from 1952 to 1956. In 1953, the England Football Association rated him among the ten best skippers of the world in its yearbook. Manna was also the captain of the Syed Abdul Rahim managed Indian team in 1952 Helsinki Olympics and a member of the 1954 Asian Games. The 1952 Summer Olympics in Helsinki was not suitable for his team as they tasted a defeat of 10–1 to Yugoslavia.

Manna also appeared with the India against numerous visiting European teams in exhibition matches in 1954, including a 1–0 defeat to Allsvenskan club AIK at CC&FC Ground in Kolkata. He hung up his boots on 27 August 1960 after playing in India's international charity match against Indonesia in New Delhi.

== Managerial career ==
After retiring from football, Manna went on to become head coach of India at the 1961 Merdeka Cup in Malaysia, in which he guided some of India's notable players like Jarnail Singh, P. K. Banerjee, Peter Thangaraj and Tulsidas Balaram. He also managed the national team in 1968 Merdeka Cup. He later became team official of Mohun Bagan and went with Karuna Bhattacharya managed team to newly independent Bangladesh in May 1972, where they defeated Dhaka Mohammedan in first match, but lost to Shadhin Bangla football team in their last match.

== Death ==
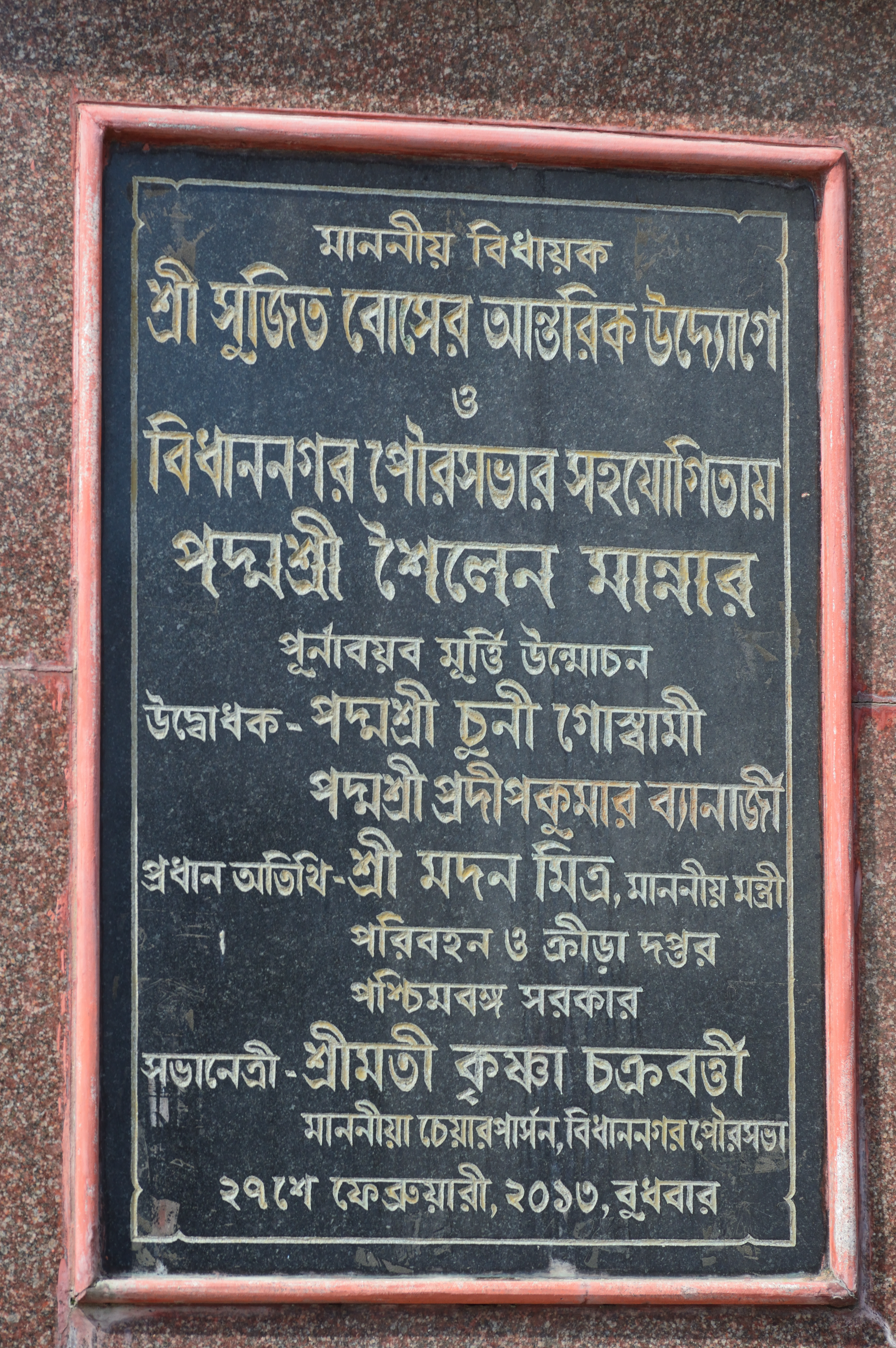
Plaque dedicated to Sailen Manna, at the Central Park of Salt Lake City, Kolkata, erected in 2013.

After being unwell for quite some time, Manna died at a private hospital in Kolkata on Monday, 27 February 2012. He was 87 years old and was survived by his wife and daughter.

== Legacy ==
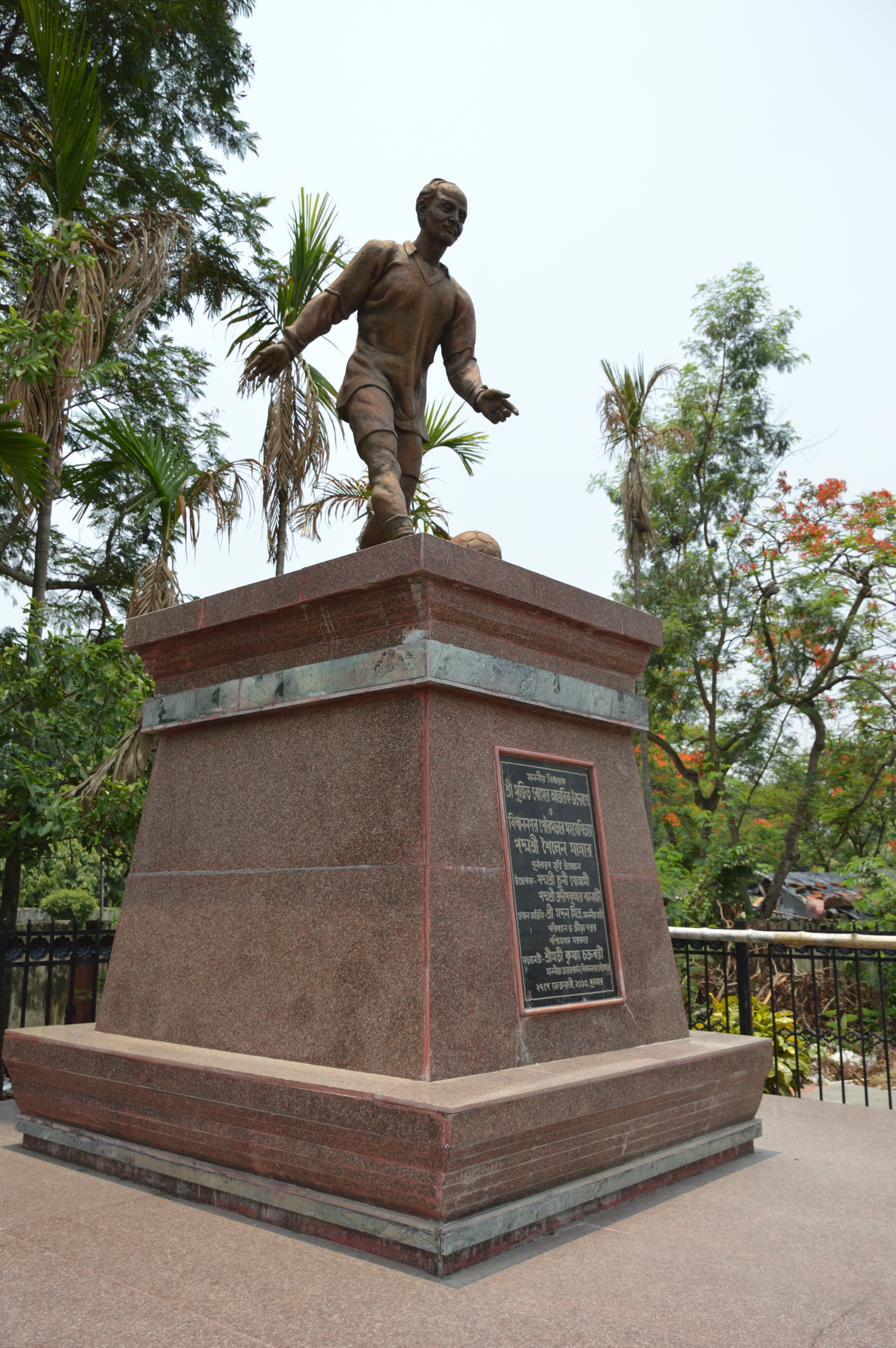
Statue of Manna at the Central Park, Salt Lake City, Kolkata.

I have no hesitation in calling him one of the best footballers of the country. He was definitely an accomplished player and also endeared everyone with his great human qualities.

— Samar Banerjee, former Indian captain and Olympian, on Manna in March 2012.

Mohun Bagan Athletic Club began giving the "Sailen Manna Memorial Award for best sportsperson" in memory of him.

"He was a great defender, with one of the best tackles in business. His man-marking was perfect and it was a tough task for any striker to go past him."

"Manna da never retaliated and remained a perfect gentleman. He was never booked during his very long career!"

— former Indian captains S. S. Narayan & Samar Banerjee remarked on Manna's flawless career.

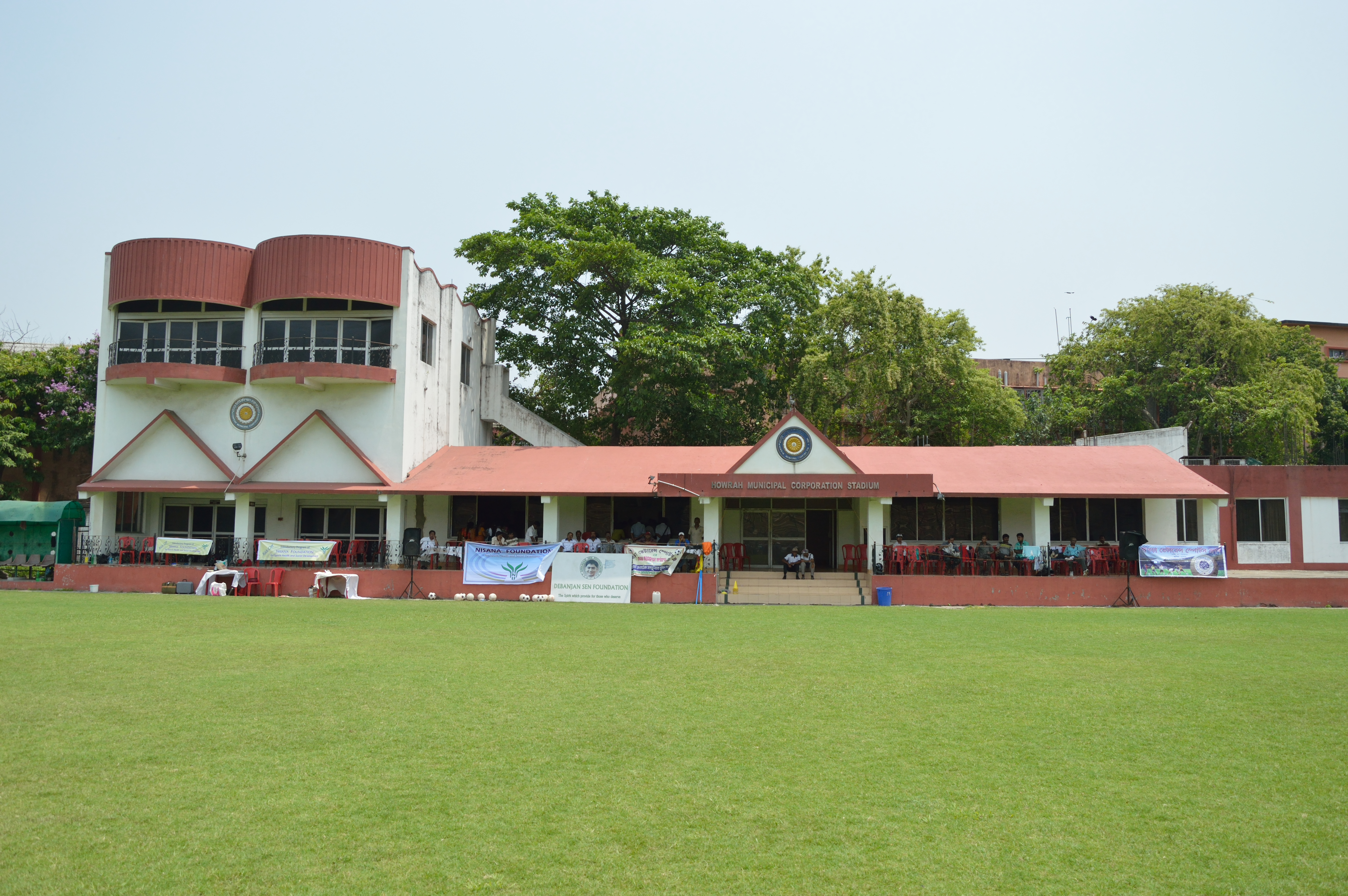
Pavilion of Sailen Manna Stadium in Howrah

In 2013, Howrah Municipal Corporation Stadium, which was one of the venues of the 2006 AFC Youth Championship, was renamed as Sailen Manna Stadium by the HMC in honour of him. In March 2020, Chief Minister of West Bengal Mamata Banerjee announced the renaming of Dumurjola Indoor Stadium as Sailen Manna Indoor Stadium.

== Honours ==
India

- Asian Games Gold medal: 1951
- Asian Quadrangular Football Tournament: 1952, 1953, 1954

Mohun Bagan

- CFL 1st Division: 1944, 1951, 1954, 1955, 1956, 1959, 1960, 1962, 1963, 1964, 1965
- Durand Cup: 1953, 1953, 1959, 1960, 1963, 1964, 1965
- IFA Shield: 1947, 1948, 1952, 1954, 1956, 1960, 1961, 1962
- Rovers Cup: 1955, 1956

Bengal

- Santosh Trophy: 1945–46, 1947–48, 1949–50, 1950–51, 1951–52, 1953–54, 1955–56, 1958–59, 1959–60, 1962–63

Individual

1. Included in the list of the 10 best Captains of the world by English FA in 1953.
2. Awarded the Padma Shri in 1971 by the Government of India.
3. Awarded the "Footballer of the Millennium" by All India Football Federation in 2000.
4. Awarded "Mohun Bagan Ratna" in 2001.
5. Awarded Banga Bibhushan in 2011 by the Government of West Bengal
6. Sportskeeda All time Indian Football XI

== See also ==
- History of Indian football
- List of India national football team managers
- History of the India national football team
- List of India national football team captains
- India national football team at the Olympics

== Bibliography ==
- Kapadia, Novy (2017). Barefoot to Boots: The Many Lives of Indian Football. Penguin Random House. ISBN 978-0-143-42641-7.
- Dineo, Paul; Mills, James (2001). Soccer in South Asia: Empire, Nation, Diaspora. London, United Kingdom: Frank Cass Publishers. p. 33. ISBN 978-0-7146-8170-2. Archived from the original on 25 July 2022.
- Bandyopadhyay, Kausik (2008). "Football in Bengali culture and society: a study in the social history of football in Bengal 1911–1980". Shodhganga. University of Calcutta. p. 35. hdl:10603/174532. Archived from the original on 7 October 2022.
- Martinez, Dolores; Mukharjiim, Projit B (2009). Football: From England to the World: The Many Lives of Indian Football. Routledge. ISBN 978-1-138-88353-6. Archived from the original on 2 July 2022.
- Shreekumar, S. S. (15 August 2020). THE BEST WAY FORWARD FOR INDIA'S FOOTBALL. HSRA Publications. p. 244. ISBN 9788194721697. Archived from the original on 4 February 2023.
- Majumdar, Boria; Bandyopadhyay, Kausik (2006). A Social History Of Indian Football: Striving To Score. Routledge. ISBN 9780415348355. Archived from the original on 29 June 2021.
- Basu, Jaydeep (2003). Stories from Indian Football. UBS Publishers' Distributors. ISBN 9788174764546. Archived from the original on 11 October 2022.
- Mitra, Soumen (1 January 2006). In Search of an Identity: The History of Football in Colonial Calcutta. Kolkata: Dasgupta & Co. Private Ltd. ISBN 978-8182110229. Archived from the original on 21 October 2022.
- Nath, Nirmal (2011). History of Indian Football: Upto 2009–10. Readers Service. ISBN 9788187891963. Archived from the original on 22 July 2022.
- "Triumphs and Disasters: The Story of Indian Football, 1889—2000" (PDF). Archived from the original (PDF) on 13 August 2012.
- Mukhopadhay, Subir (2018). সোনায় লেখা ইতিহাসে মোহনবাগান (transl. Mohun Bagan in the history written in gold). ISBN 978-93-850172-0-9.
- Majumdar, Boria, Bandyopadhyay, Kausik (2006). Goalless: The Story of a Unique Footballing Nation. Penguin India. ISBN 9780670058747.
- Banerjee, Argha; Basu, Rupak (2022). মোহনবাগান: সবুজ ঘাসের মেরুন গল্প (transl. Mohun Bagan: Green fields' Maroon stories). Shalidhan. ISBN 978-81-954667-0-2.
