= Fred Pugsley =

Burmese footballer

Personal information
- Full name: Fred Pugsley
- Place of birth: Rangoon, Burma, British India
- Date of death: 1958
- Place of death: Burma
- Position: Forward

Senior career*
Years	Team	Apps	(Gls)
- Rangoon Customs
1936	Kalighat		
1942–1945	East Bengal		(48)
1944–1945	Bengal		

International career
1938–1948	Burma XI		
- * Club domestic league appearances and goals

Fred Pugsley was an Anglo-Burmese football player, who played primarily as a forward and achieved fame and popularity during his days in Indian club East Bengal FC. He was born in Rangoon, Burma, a British colony, where football is one of the popular sports. He began his football career in an amateur league club in Rangoon during the late 1930s. He is considered as the first ever foreign signing by an Indian football club.

== Club career ==
In 1936, Pugsley played for Kalighat.

Holding the hands of his wife and daughter, Pugsley walked down to Calcutta (now Kolkata). He was a reputed player in Rangoon (now Yangon), but had no friends in India. All he knew were few officials in East Bengal Club since the red and yellow team had toured Burma a few years ago to play some exhibition matches. Extremely ill because of the inhuman exhaustion he suffered while running away from his country, a frail looking Pugsley requested East Bengal club officials to try him out for their team.

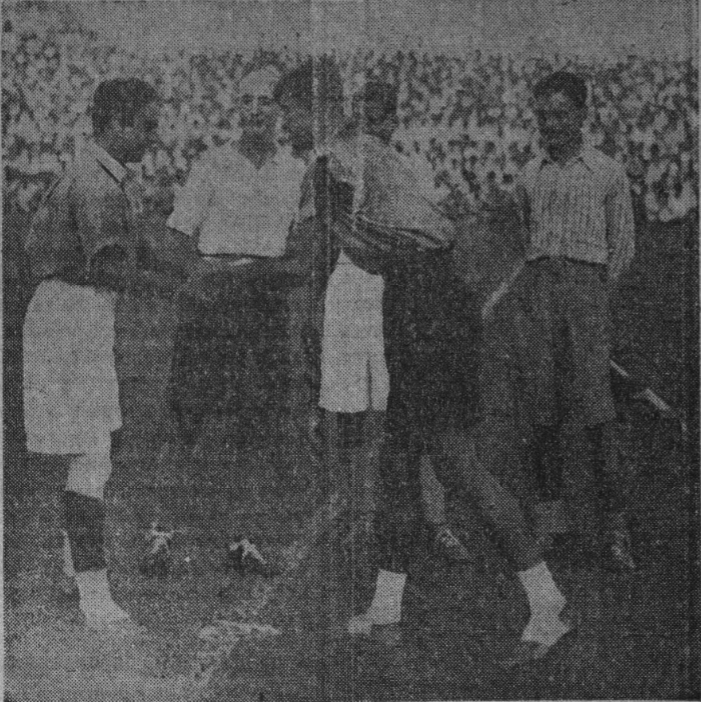
1945 IFA Shield Final – East Bengal and Mohun Bagan captains before the match, in which, Pugsley scored the lone goal.

The club officials were hesitant. First, East Bengal had never included a foreigner before. And more importantly, Pugsley's poor health was surely a cause of worry. They reluctantly fielded him in three matches and when Pugsley started vomiting midway through the third, he was withdrawn promptly for the season. But Pugsley soon recovered as one of East Bengal's greatest strikers.

In the 1945 season, East Bengal won their first "double" in domestic football – they won both the Calcutta Football League and IFA Shield. In the Shield final, East Bengal beat their traditional rivals Mohun Bagan AC by a solitary goal. The second-half strike came from the boot of Pugsley. It was an epoch-making achievement in East Bengal history, something the club fans could never forget.

Indian football had rarely seen a goal-machine like Pugsley. In a Rovers Cup match, East Bengal struck 11 goals, Pugsley scored eight of them. While representing Bengal football team in Santosh Trophy (there was no rule those days against playing foreigners in state teams), he scored seven goals in the 7–0 rout of Rajputana.

His thundering left footers left may goalkeepers spending sleepless nights before he decided to return to his country after the war. He scored a total of 48 goals for East Bengal.

== International career ==
Pugsley represented Burma during its maiden international tour to India in 1938, where they played against India and IFA XI representative sides. They also played against the major Calcutta clubs Mohun Bagan and East Bengal. He scored two goals in the match against the India XI side on 30 May 1938 at Calcutta. After the War, he also returned for a national team tour to India in 1948 and played against the IFA XI side and the major Calcutta clubs.

== Personal life ==
Pugsley was born in an Anglo-Burmese family in British controlled Burma. In his childhood days, he chose football as his love and later joined a local Rangoon-based amateur club during the late 1930s. At the beginning of the Second World War, Burma was still a British colony from 1939 to 1942 and was attacked by the Japanese forces simultaneously. Pugsley faced tremendous helplessness in his homeland before moving to neighbouring country India in 1942.

It was not an easy journey. The refugees had to travel for almost 500 kilometres entirely on foot, through dense forests, over mountains and across rivers. Several of them perished on the way and many of the ones who survived were injured or seriously ill. Pugsley and his family survived, but were essentially in a land which was foreign to them; they had never visited India before and didn't know anybody there and had no jobs to feed themselves.

Luckily for Pugsley, his reputation as a footballer earned him a job in Burnpur at the Indian Iron and Steel Company, which was majority-owned by Sir Birendranath Mookerjee, who later became president of East Bengal's arch-rival Mohun Bagan Club.

Pugsley returned to Burma in 1946 with his family after the war. He also worked as an employee in Rangoon Customs. He died in 1958.

== Goalscoring records ==
- Most goals in a single match: (8 goals) for East Bengal (vs BCLI Rail), 1945 Rovers Cup
- He also holds the unique record of scoring 8 goals in a single match against B.C.L.I Railways in the 1945 Rovers Cup match, which is till date the most goals scored by an individual in a single match in Indian football.

== Honours ==
East Bengal

- Calcutta Football League: 1942, 1945
- IFA Shield: 1943, 1945

Bengal

- Santosh Trophy: 1945–46, 1947–48

Individual

- Rovers Cup top scorer: 1945

== See also ==
- List of foreign players for SC East Bengal
