= Deba Singh =

Indian footballer

Personal information
- Full name: Debendra Prasad Singh
- Date of birth: 1943
- Place of birth: Cuttack, Odisha, India
- Date of death: 18 November 2024
- Position: Defender

Senior career*
Years	Team	Apps	(Gls)
- Orissa Police
- Orissa

International career
1967–1968	India	1	(0)
- * Club domestic league appearances and goals

Debendra Prasad "Deba" Singh (1943 – 18 November 2024) was an Indian footballer who played as a defender for Orissa and the India national team.

== Personal life ==
He is the father of former Indian international footballer Rajendra Prasad Singh. Singh received the first OSJA (Odisha Sports Journalists’ Association) awards in 2018. Singh died on 18 November 2024, at the age of 82.

== Club career ==
He played for Orissa Police in the Cuttack Senior League domestically. Singh was part of the Orissa team which was coached by Amal Dutta and captained the squad that reached the semi-finals in the 1967–68 edition of the Santosh Trophy by defeating Andhra Pradesh.

== International career ==
Singh made his senior national team debut in his only appearance against Myanmar in an international friendly.
