= Sheikh Abdul Latif =

Indian footballer (1928–2000)

Personal information
- Date of birth: 15 August 1928
- Place of birth: Purnia, Bihar and Orissa, British India (now in Bihar, India)
- Date of death: 2 February 2000 (aged 71)
- Place of death: Calcutta, West Bengal, India
- Height: 1.78 m (5 ft 10 in)

Senior career*
Years	Team	Apps	(Gls)
- Mohammedan SC
- Bombay
- Caltex Club

International career
1951–1960	India		
Medal record
Men's football
Representing India
Asian Games
Gold medal – first place	1951 New Delhi	Team
- * Club domestic league appearances and goals

Sheikh Abdul Latif (also Sheikh Abdul Lateef; 15 August 1928 – 2 February 2000) was an Indian footballer. He participated at the 1952 Summer Olympics, 1956 Summer Olympics and the 1960 Summer Olympics, with Syed Abdul Rahim managed India. In 1959–60, he captained the national team.

== Playing career ==
Latif during his playing days, was influenced by Indian football legend Syed Abdus Samad. In 1959, Latif led India in pre-Olympics and Merdeka tournament. In 1960, he was denied being the India captain for the Olympics. A couple of years later, he later migrated to Pakistan.

== Honours ==
India

- Asian Games Gold medal: 1951
- Asian Quadrangular Football Tournament: 1954
- Merdeka Tournament runner-up: 1959

Bengal

- Santosh Trophy:
  - Winner (3): 1949–50, 1950–51

Bombay

- Santosh Trophy
  - Runner-up: 1958–59
