= Ramchandra Parab =

Indian footballer

Personal information
- Full name: Ramchandra Balaram Parab
- Date of birth: 1922
- Date of death: 1 August 2006 (aged 83–84)
- Place of death: Mumbai, Maharashtra, India

Senior career*
Years	Team	Apps	(Gls)
- Rajasthan Club
- Indian Culture League
- Dynamos

International career
- India
- * Club domestic league appearances and goals

Ramchandra Parab (1922 – 1 August 2006) was a footballer who represented India in the 1948 London Olympics.

== Honours ==
- Santosh Trophy: Runners-up 1947–48

== Sources ==
- Mehta, Aditya (3 August 2006). "Olympian footballer Parab dead". CNN-IBN. Archived from the original on 14 October 2012.
