= 1943 IFA Shield final =

- Event: 1943 IFA Shield
East Bengal	Police A.C.
3	0
- Date: 26 August 1943
- Venue: Calcutta Ground, Kolkata, West Bengal
- Referee: P. Mishra

The 1943 IFA Shield final was the 51st final of the IFA Shield, the second oldest football competition in India, and was contested between Kolkata clubs East Bengal and Police A.C. on 26 August 1943 at the Calcutta Ground in Kolkata.

East Bengal won the final 3–0 to claim their 1st IFA Shield title. Appa Rao, Fatik Sinha and A.C. Somana scored the three goals in the final as East Bengal became the fourth Indian team after Mohun Bagan, Mohammedan Sporting and Aryan to lift the IFA Shield title.

== Route to the final ==
East Bengal		Round	Police A.C.	
Opponent	Result	Round	Opponent	Result
bye	–	First Round	Bengal Sporting	5–0
Kushtia Shivkali	8–1	Second Round	Mahishur Blues	2–0
BI Battalion	3–0	Third Round	Burnpur United	0–0; 3–1
Bhawanipore	1–0	Quarter–Final	Aryan	3–1
B & A Railway	7–1	Semi–Final	Mohun Bagan	0–0; 0–0; 0–0; 1–0

== Match ==
=== Summary ===
The IFA Shield final began at the Calcutta Ground in Kolkata on 26 August 1943 in front of a packed crowd as East Bengal and Police A.C. faced each other. East Bengal reached their second consecutive final after defeating B & A Railway 7–1 in the semi-final, having lost the previous one to Mohammedan Sporting in 1942. Police made their third appearance in the final after 1937 and 1939, being champions in 1939, after they defeated the reigning Calcutta Football League champions Mohun Bagan 1–0 in the semi-final. East Bengal however, started the match positively as Appa Rao scored in the third minute of the match with a header after the ball rebounded off Police custodian Withers after he failed to save a powerful shot from Fatik Sinha. It was Fatik Sinha who double the lead in the second half as he headed home from close range. A.C. Somana made it three for East Bengal with a powerful shot after receiving a pass from Appa Rao as East Bengal became only the fourth Indian team to lift the IFA Shield title.

=== Details ===
26 August 1943
14:30 IST

East Bengal	3–0	Police
Appa Rao; Fatik Sinha; A.C. Somana

Calcutta Ground, Kolkata
Attendance: 20,000 (est.)
Referee: P. Mishra

East Bengal	Police A.C.

GK	(British Raj) D Sen
CB	(British Raj) Paritosh Chakraborty
CB	(British Raj) Rakhal Mazumdar (c)
CM	(British Raj) Ajit Nandi
CM	(British Raj) Arokiraj
CM	(British Raj) Nogen Ray
FW	(British Raj) Fatik Sinha
FW	(British Raj) Apparao
FW	(British Raj) A.C. Somana
FW	(British Raj) Sunil Ghosh
FW	(British Raj) Sushil Chatterjee

GK	(United Kingdom) Withers
CB	(United Kingdom) J. Fawls (c)
CB	(United Kingdom) Myers
CM	(United Kingdom) M. Mills
CM	(United Kingdom) Robinson
CM	(United Kingdom) Avertoom
FW	(United Kingdom) L. Hay
FW	(United Kingdom) E. Templeton
FW	(United Kingdom) Hearn
FW	(United Kingdom) P. D'Mellow
FW	(United Kingdom) Allen

Match rules

- 50 minutes.
- Joint winners if both finals ends in a draw
