= Rajendra Prasad Singh (footballer) =

Indian footballer (born 1974)

R. P. Singh
Personal information
- Full name: Rajendra Prasad Singh
- Date of birth: 11 July 1974 (age 52)
- Place of birth: Cuttack, Odisha, India
- Position: Midfielder

Youth career
- SAI Hostel

Senior career*
Years	Team	Apps	(Gls)
1990–1992	SAI Hostel		
?–1997	State Bank of India		
1997–2002	Mohun Bagan		
2002–2003	Mahindra United		
2004–2005	State Bank Travancore		

International career
2000–2002	India	17	(0)

Managerial career
- 2013–2014: Odisha
- * Club domestic league appearances and goals

Rajendra Prasad "R. P." Singh (born 11 July 1974) is an Indian former footballer who played as a midfielder. He has represented the club Mohun Bagan and the India national team.

== Early life ==
Singh was born in Cuttack, Odisha and is the son of former Odisha state football team captain and international footballer Debendra Prasad Singh.

== Club career ==
Singh started playing football for SAI Hostel in Odisha in 1990. He played for SBI in the Cuttack League and later went to play for major division Indian clubs Mohun Bagan and Mahindra United FC. He was part of the Mohun Bagan squad that won their first NFL title in the 1997–98 season.

Singh represented the state teams of Odisha and Bengal. He captained the Odisha side which reached the semi-finals in the 1993–94. He also represented Bengal which played in the Santosh Trophy and was part of the Bengal team which won in the 1998 and 1999 editions.

== International career ==
Singh made his senior national team debut against Bangladesh in the MFF Golden Jubilee Tournament held at Maldives in 2000. He played in the national team matches in the 2002 World Cup qualifiers. He was part of the national team squad that toured England in 2002 where India played against Jamaica.

== Coaching career ==
Singh was appointed the head coach of the Odisha team for the 2013–14 Santosh Trophy season. He also serves as the mentor of the Sunrise Club which participates in the FAO League.

== Honours ==
Mohun Bagan

- National Football League: 1997–98, 1999–2000, 2001–02
- Durand Cup: 2000
- Rovers Cup: 2000–01
- Sikkim Gold Cup: 2000, 2001
- DCM Trophy: 1997

Bengal

- Santosh Trophy: 1997–98, 1998–99

Individual

- NFL Best Player: 1999–2000
