= Subhash Sarbadhikari =

Indian footballer

Personal information
- Position: Midfielder

Senior career*
Years	Team	Apps	(Gls)
- Mohun Bagan

International career
- India
- * Club domestic league appearances and goals

Subash Sarbadhikari was an Indian footballer. He was part of the team that played at the 1952 Summer Olympics, but he did not play in any matches. He was part of the Mohun Bagan team that won the Durand Cup in 1953.

== Honours ==
=== Bengal ===
- Santosh Trophy: 1955–56

Mohun Bagan

- Durand Cup: 1953
