= Inder Singh (footballer) =

Indian footballer, manager, administrator

Personal information
- Date of birth: 23 December 1943 (age 82)
- Place of birth: Phagwara, Punjab Province, British India
- Position: Forward

Team information
- Current team: JCT Mills
- Number: 9

Senior career*
Years	Team	Apps	(Gls)
1962–1974	Leaders Jalandhar		
1974–1985	JCT Mills		

International career
1962–1975	India		

Managerial career
- 1985–2001: JCT Mills
Medal record
Men's football
Representing India
AFC Asian Cup
Runner-up	1964 Israel	Team
- * Club domestic league appearances and goals

Inder Singh (born 23 December 1943) is an Indian former football player and captain, manager and administrator. He played for Leaders Club of Jalandhar, JCT Mills, and the India national team, predominantly as a forward. He began his senior professional career with Leaders Club Jalandhar in 1962 and moved to JCT Mills in 1974. Playing for Punjab in the Santosh Trophy, he finished the 1974–75 tournament with 23 goals, a record that still stands. He was included in the AFC Asian All Stars team in 1968. He retired as a player in 1985.

He had a successful managerial career with Mills from 1985 to 2001, following which he was associated with Mills as an administrator from 2001 to 2011. In 1969, he received the Arjuna Award, in recognition of his contribution to Indian football. Nicknamed "bullet train" by the Japanese for his speed on football field, Singh stuck to his roots and played for the country, declining the offer of representing Malaysia in 1973.

== Early life ==
Singh was born on 23 December 1943, in Phagwara, in the erstwhile Punjab Province of British India. As a student of Government High School, Phagwara, he played for the school at various tournaments, including the All-India School Games in 1960 and 1961. He finished as the top goal scorer and was awarded the 'Best Player' award.

== Club career ==
Leaders Club

Impressed with his talent, Singh was selected by Leaders Club, Jalandhar, as its guest player. He would play exhibition matches for the club and other tournaments as a guest player, until he was signed by the club when he passed out of school. In his first season with the club in 1962 as a senior player, he played in the DCM Trophy in Delhi. The tournament had established and stronger team like Salgaocar, Mysore XI, Mohammedan and Mafatlal Mills playing. Leaders finished the tournament in third place losing only to Mafatlal Mills in the semifinal. For the third place, they beat Mysore XI 4–1. Singh finished as the top scorer for his club. Leaders managed to reach the finals of the Trophy a further four times; 1966, 1967, 1968 and 1971, but lost in the final each time.

JCT Mills

In 1974, Singh left Leaders to join another Punjab-based club, JCT Mills. He had a successful spells with Mills, winning two Durand Cup tournaments, in 1975 and 1983, and reaching the finals five times. Playing last for Mills, he retired from professional football in 1985.

== Santosh Trophy ==
Singh played for his home state of Punjab in the Santosh Trophy. He had a hugely successful 1974–75 Santosh Trophy season captaining Punjab to the title. The team managed by Jarnail Singh, finished the tournament having scored 46 goals, with Singh scoring 23 of them, a record that still stands. The team beat Bengal in the final 6–0, with Singh scoring a hat-trick.

== International career ==
Singh made his debut in the India national team in 1963. He was selected to play in the 1964 AFC Asian Cup in Tel Aviv. In the first game against South Korea, India won 2–0, with Singh scoring for the second goal in the 57th minute. Scoring his second goal against Hong Kong in India's 3–1 victory, he finished as the tournament's joint top scorer with two goals and India finished second. He was awarded the 'Best Right-out' at the tournament. He was part of the team at the 1966 Asian Games in Bangkok, finishing the tournament with one goal as India failed to defend its gold medal from the 1962 Games.

Singh found considerable success at the Malaysian tournament, Merdeka Cup. Making his first appearance in 1964, he finished with two goals, against Cambodia and South Korea. India finished as runner-up in the tournament. In 1967, he was included in the Asian All Stars XI team that played Arsenal in Kuala Lumpur. After missing out for two editions, he came back in 1968 and finished with three goals. He was made the captain for the first time in its 1969 tournament, where India were knocked out after the group stage games, and Singh finished the tournament with a lone goal that came against Singapore. Following an injury he sustained during its 1970 tournament, he sat out of the team for a year. He returned at its 1973 tournament as India's captain and scored a brace over Thailand, with India finishing sixth. Impressed by his performances at the tournament, he was asked to play for the Malaysian national team, by the then Malaysian Prime Minister Tunku Abdul Rahman. Singh politely refused the offer saying he would play only for Punjab and India. He made his last appearance for India in 1975.

== Career statistics ==
=== Selected international goals ===
Date	Venue	Opponent	Result	Competition	Goals
27 May 1964	Municipal Stadium, Haifa	South Korea	2–0	1964 AFC Asian Cup	1
2 June 1964	Bloomfield Stadium, Tel Aviv	Hong Kong	3–1	1964 AFC Asian Cup	1
27 August 1964	Kuala Lumpur, Malaya	Cambodia	4–0	1964 Merdeka Tournament	1
4 September 1964	Kuala Lumpur, Malaya	South Korea XI	2–1	1964 Merdeka Tournament	1
12 December 1966	Suphachalasai Stadium, Bangkok	Malaysia	2–1	1966 Asian Games	1
22 August 1967	Kuala Lumpur, Malaya	Chinese Taipei	1–1	1967 Merdeka Tournament	1
17 August 1968	Kuala Lumpur, Malaya	Burma	3–1	1968 Merdeka Tournament	1
29 July 1973	Kuala Lumpur, Malaya	Thailand	2–0	1973 Merdeka Tournament	2

== Post-playing career ==
Following his retirement of professional football as a player in 1985 with JCT Mills, he went on to manage the club for 16 years, until 2001. During his tenure, the club went on to win the Federation Cup twice in 1995 and 1996. The club also clinched National Football League title in the inaugural season of 1996–97. JCT also won IFA Shield in 1996, first club outside Kolkata to do so. They later participated in Asian Club Championship in 1996–97 and moved to second round before losing 1–2 aggregate to New Radiant of Maldives. Following his spell as a manager of his former club, he was made the Honorary Secretary of the Punjab Football Association, a post that he held from 2001 to 2011.

== Honours ==
India

- AFC Asian Cup runners-up: 1964
- Merdeka Tournament runner-up: 1964; third place: 1970

Punjab

- Santosh Trophy: 1970–71, 1974–75, 1980–81

Individual

- AFC Asian Cup top scorer: 1964
- Santosh Trophy top scorer: 1974–75 (with 23 goals; Record)

Awards

- Arjuna Award: 1969
- AFC Asian All Stars: 1968
- Delhi Sports Journalists Association Award: 1974
- Pride of Phagwara Award: 2003

== See also ==
- History of Indian football
- History of the India national football team
- List of India national football team captains
