= Norbert Fruvall =

Indian footballer

Senior career*
Years	Team	Apps	(Gls)
- Hyderabad City Police

Managerial career
- Hyderabad City Police
- * Club domestic league appearances and goals

Norbert Andrew Fruvall was an Indian footballer.

In the 1940s, Fruvall was the captain and the coach of Hyderabad City Police that was one of the strongest football teams in India. He recruited players like Noor Muhammad, Moinuddin and G. Y. S. Laiq. The Police won the Ashe Gold Cup in Bangalore in 1943 defeating Royal Air Force 2–1, with Fruvall scoring both goals. When the Durand Cup was resumed after war in 1950, they won it in the first year.

Fruvall was selected to play for India in the 1948 Olympics but could not make it. He retired from football in 1951. He captained Hyderabad in their first appearance in Santosh Trophy in 1944.

His son Conrad Fruvall was a cricketer. He was a left-handed batsman who played for Indian Schools in 1973 and first class cricket for Hyderabad Cricket Association in the Moin-ud-Dowlah Gold Cup Tournament in 1974-75. He worked and played for State Bank of India for two years and then migrated to Australia.
