= Odisha football team =

Odisha
- Full name: Odisha football team
- Founded: 1949; 77 years ago (as Orissa football team)
- Ground: Kalinga Stadium
- Capacity: 15,000
- Owner: Football Association of Odisha
- Chairman: Tankadhar Tripathy
- Head coach: Akshay Das
- League: Santosh Trophy
- 2024–25: Quarter-finals
Home colours	Away colours

The Odisha football team (Odia: ଓଡ଼ିଶା ଫୁଟବଲ ଟୀମ୍), also earlier the Orissa football team, is a football team representing the state of Odisha, India. The Football Association of Odisha, a state association of All India Football Federation, controls the team. The team competes in Indian state football competitions including the Santosh Trophy. Prior to 2014, the team competed as the Orissa.

== Stadium ==
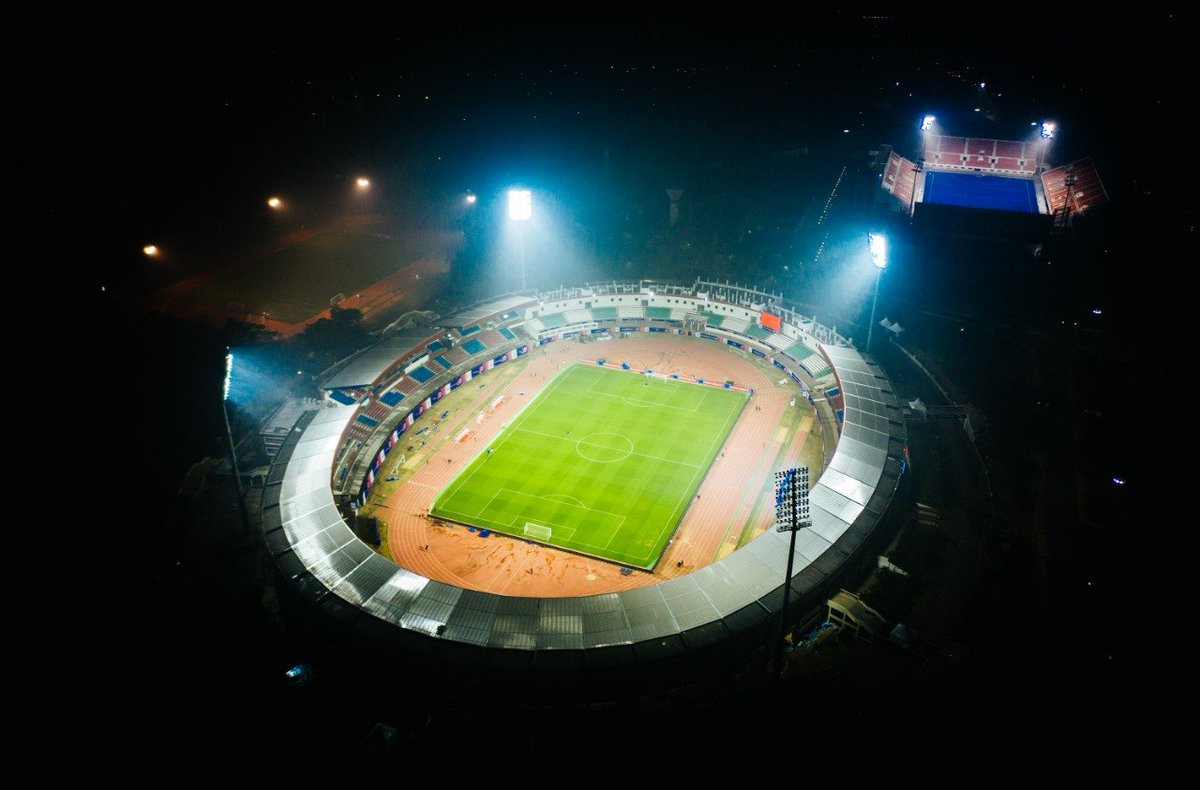
An elevated view of the Kalinga Stadium in 2019

Established in 1978, the Kalinga Stadium in Bhubaneswar serves as the home ground of Odisha. The 15,000-capacity stadium has hosted several national and international tournaments including the I-League, Super Cup, and Women's Gold Cup. It was one of the stadium that hosted matches in the 2022 FIFA U-17 Women's World Cup. The stadium is also the home base for the national and youth team camps. Indian Arrows, AIFF's developmental side, is also based at the Kalinga Stadium.

== Personnel ==
Position	Name
Head coach	(India) Akshay Das
Assistant coach	(India) Chittaranjan Behera
Team manager	(India) Gangadhar Behera
Physiotherapist	(India) Saroj Kumar Das

== Players ==
- The following 20 players were called up for the 2025–26 Santosh Trophy.

Note: Flags indicate national team as defined under FIFA eligibility rules; some limited exceptions apply. Players may hold more than one non-FIFA nationality.

No.	Pos.	Nation	Player
1	GK	IND	Siddhanta Pradhan
3	DF	IND	Harishankar Nayak
4	DF	IND	Rakesh Oram
5	DF	IND	Ashok Bag
6	MF	IND	Arpan Lakra
7	FW	IND	Arbin Lakra
8	FW	IND	Ganesh Sethi
9	FW	IND	Srikant Gadaba
10	FW	IND	Kartik Hantal (Captain)
11	FW	IND	Mahesh Hansda

No.	Pos.	Nation	Player
12	DF	IND	Pintu Samal
15	MF	IND	Gaurav Negi
17	FW	IND	Suresh Khadia
18	DF	IND	Bisal Tigga
19	FW	IND	Jitu Muduli
20	MF	IND	Chandra Mohan Murmu
21	GK	IND	Soumya Ranjan Das
22	MF	IND	Ranjan Soren
23	DF	IND	Abinash Muduli
24	FW	IND	Raisen Tudu

== Results and fixtures ==
=== Matches ===
As of 26 December 2025

The following is a list of match results in the last 12 months, as well as any future matches that have been scheduled.

==== 2025 ====
22 December 2025 Santosh Trophy	Odisha	4–0	Madhya Pradesh	Narayanpur, Chhattisgarh
09:00 UTC+5:30	Kartik Hantal 15'; Jitu Muduli 75'; Srikant Gadaba 77', 90+4'	Report		Stadium: Ramakrishna Mission Football Ground

24 December 2025 Santosh Trophy	Telangana	0–1	Odisha	Narayanpur, Chhattisgarh
09:00 UTC+5:30		Report	Kartik Hantal 42'	Stadium: Ramakrishna Mission Football Ground

26 December 2025 Santosh Trophy	Chhattisgarh	1–3	Odisha	Narayanpur, Chhattisgarh
15:00 UTC+5:30	Kartik Hantal 64'	Report	Jitu Muduli 32'; Chandra Mohan Murmu 37'; Kartik Hantal 64'	Stadium: Ramakrishna Mission Football Ground

== Management ==
=== Board of directors ===
Position	Name
President	(India) Tankadhar Tripathy
Vice president	(India) Bijay Das
Vice president	(India) Dilip Kumar Sahoo
Vice president	(India) Hrudaya Ranjan Behera
Honorary secretary	(India) Asirbad Behera
Executive secretary	(India) Avijit Kumar Paul
Joint secretary	(India) Sangeeta Sharma
Treasurer	(India) Bhakta Ballav Das
Head of referees	(India) Durga Madhab Naik
Golden Baby League development officer	(India) Subhasis Behera

== Honours ==
=== State (youth) ===
- B. C. Roy Trophy (Junior National Football Championship)

(gold) Winners (1): 1968–69
(silver) Runners-up (3): 1961–62, 1976–77, 2024–25

- Mir Iqbal Hussain Trophy (Sub-Junior National Football Championship)

(gold) Winners (1): 2018–19
(silver) Runners-up (4): 1993–94, 2000–01, 2012–13, 2015–16

== Notable players ==
Below the players, are notable footballers who represented the Odisha football team. Senior International players in bold.

- **A. M. Bachan**
- **Golak Samal**
- **Deba Singh**
- Bharati Mishra, India U19 (1965)
- Shaikh Younus, India U19 (1978)
- Mohammad Shahid Jabbar
- **Rajendra Prasad Singh**
- Akshay Das, India U19 (1999–2000)
- Tankadhar Bag, India U20 (2022–2023)
- Bekey Oram, India U23 (2025)

== Notable squads ==
- 1950–51 Santosh Trophy: Bari, Alam, Enayat, Jenamani, Sachi Das, Chitta Sahu, Biranjan Bera, Golak Samal, A. M. Bachan (captain), Sita Ramarao, Tareque Hussain
- 1967–68 Santosh Trophy: Bharati Mishra, Marshal, Deba Singh (captain), Biswas, Behera, Aziz, Giridharilal Nayak, Sahu, Ramakrishna, Bijay Das, Manmath Nath Singh
