= Hyderabad football team =

Football club (1944–1959)

Hyderabad
- Full name: Hyderabad football team
- Founded: 1944
- Dissolved: 1959
- Owner: Hyderabad Football Association
- League: Santosh Trophy

The Hyderabad football team was an Indian domestic football team representing the state of Hyderabad. The team played in the Santosh Trophy from 1944–45 season until the 1959 season.

== Hyderabad Football Association ==
The sports federation was formed in 1939 as the Hyderabad Football Association under the initiative of the first secretary Syed Mohammad Hadi. Ghulam Muhammad was elected the first President of HFA and in 1942 Hadi became the President with Syed Abdul Rahim becoming the secretary.

In 1959, under the auspices of the then AIFF vice-president Shiv Kumar Lal, the Andhra and Hyderabad Football Associations were merged to form the Andhra Pradesh Football Association.

== History ==
They have appeared in the Santosh Trophy finals 4 times, and have won the trophy twice. The team competed as Hyderabad football team until 1959, when the Hyderabad Football Association was merged with the Andhra Football Association to establish the combined team as Andhra Pradesh football team.

== Notable players ==
Hyderabad football team was one of the major state teams of Indian football during the 1950s and produced some of the country's finest footballers such as Sayed Khwaja Aziz-ud-Din, Muhammad Noor, Anthony Patrick, and Syed Shahid Hakim.

== Honours ==
=== State ===
- Santosh Trophy
  - Winners (2): 1956–57, 1957–58
  - Runners-up (2): 1949–50, 1950–51

=== Others ===
Hyderabad FA

- DCM Trophy
  - Runners-up (1): 1954
