= 1947–48 Santosh Trophy =

National Football Championship

Tournament details
- Country: India

Final positions
- Champions: Bengal (3rd title)
- Runners-up: Bombay
- 60 minute matches

The 1947–48 Santosh Trophy was the fifth edition of the Santosh Trophy, the main State competition for football in India. Bengal defeated Bombay 1–0 in the replayed final.

The tournament was held in Calcutta, West Bengal and the matches were played on the grounds of Calcutta Football Club.

== Quarter-final ==
14 October 1947

Bombay	5–1	Bihar
Parab 9'; Brown 23', 59'; Thomas 42', 60'	Report	47' Rameshwarlal

CFC ground, Calcutta
Referee: P.T. Kanniappan (Madras)

== Semi-final ==
15 October 1947

Bengal	5–1	United Provinces
Sunil Ghosh 12'; Pugsley 30'; Nandy 42'; Mewalal 43', 56'	Report	29' Abid

CFC ground, Calcutta
Referee: Sushil Ghosh
16 October 1947

Bombay	1–0	Mysore
Thomas 55'	Report

CFC ground, Calcutta
Referee: Dr. S. Dutt

== Final ==
18 October 1947

Bengal	0–0	Bombay
	Report

CFC ground, Calcutta
Referee: Sushil Ghosh

Das scored an off-side goal six minutes before the end.

19 October 1947

Bengal	1–0 replay	Bombay
R. Das 39'	Report

CFC ground, Calcutta
Referee: Sushil Ghosh

In the 19th minute, Bengal center forward Sinha collided with Bombay inside left Brown. Sinha was carried off and Bengal played the rest of the match with ten players.

Das received the pass from Mewalal in an apparently off-side position and after some hesitation, pushed the ball into the net. The referee later explained that he gave the goal as the ball had last been played by a Bombay defender.
