= Syed Moinuddin =

Indian footballer (1924–1978)

Personal information
- Full name: Syed Khwaja Moinuddin
- Date of birth: 1924
- Date of death: 1 October 1978 (aged 53–54)
- Place of death: Hyderabad, Andhra Pradesh (now in Telangana), India
- Position: Forward

Senior career*
Years	Team	Apps	(Gls)
- Hyderabad City Police

International career
- India
- * Club domestic league appearances and goals

Syed Khwaja Moinuddin (1924 – 1 October 1978), usually called Moin, was an Indian footballer. He competed in the men's tournament at the 1952 Summer Olympics.

== Playing career ==
"Moin" was coached in the youth by Syed Abdul Rahim. He represented Hyderabad Eleven Hunters and the Student Athletic Club, and Hyderabad Police. He served in the Police for 36 years, retiring as Inspector in 1977 and having played until 1963. He could not take part in the 1948 Olympics due to the absence of a sponsor, but played in the 1952 Olympics under Sailen Manna and in the 1954 Asian Games. He captained India at home against Sweden in 1954 and Russia in 1955. He scored a hat-trick for Hyderabad in the third-place match of the 1953 – 54 Santosh Trophy.

== Death ==
He died because of heart attack in Hyderabad. His obituaries reported that he was 56 at the time of his death.

== Honours ==
Hyderabad

- Santosh Trophy: 1956 – 57

India

- Asian Quadrangular Football Tournament: 1954

== Personal life ==
Moinuddin's family has a rich footballing lineage. His son's, Syed Lateefuddin, Syed Fareeduddin, Syed Azizuddin and Syed Sharfuddin, was an international winger who played for Mohammedan Sporting and East Bengal, Mahindra, South-Central Railways, Hyderabad City Police. Grand Son Syed Nadeem Uddin., Syed Masiuddin, Syed Aleemuddin and more)
