= Suman Chakraborty (commentator) =

English and Bangla sports commentator and journalist

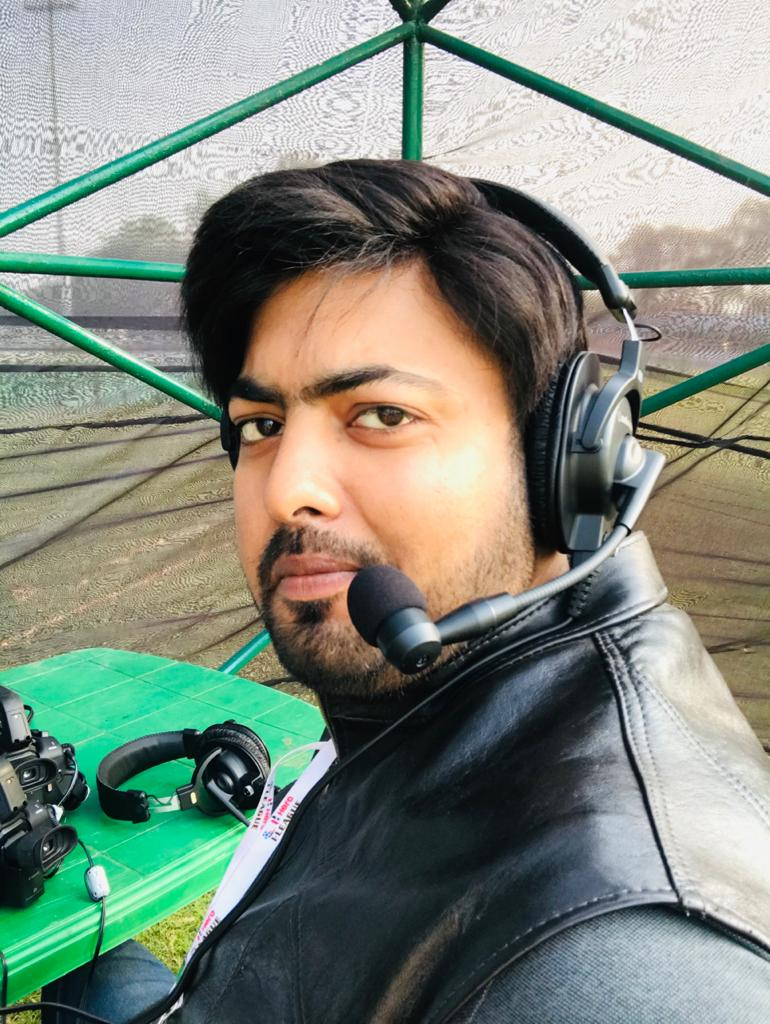
- Born: 15 February 1990 (age 36); Kolkata, West Bengal
- Occupations: Sports journalist and commentator
- Years active: 2012–present
- Television: 2022 FIFA World Cup, La Liga, Premier League, Indian Premier League, FIFA World Cup qualifier, Indian Super League, I-League, Federation Cup, Durand Cup, Calcutta Football League

Suman Chakraborty (born 15 February 1990) is an Indian sports journalist, football commentator, TV presenter, football analyst and writer in English and Bangla. He has commentated on around 1000 official football matches.

== Personal life ==
Suman Chakraborty was born on 15 February 1990, in a Bengali family in Kolkata, West Bengal.

== Career ==
Chakraborty started working as a journalist in the Indian Super League in 2014. Then he worked as a football commentator at Ten Sports, Sony Six, Jalsha Movies and ESPN STAR Sports. He joined the Kolkata-based sports media house Xtra Time and worked as a sports journalist and football analyst there. He first commented in a Federation Cup match between Salgaocar FC and Bengaluru FC, at the Tilak Maidan in 2014, along with Novy Kapadia. He commentated in the Calcutta Football League, Federation Cup, Durand Cup. He also became the youngest to commentate in a FIFA World Cup qualifier match, in Sony Six. He also worked as the media manager in an Indian football club, Punjab FC. Currently, he is working at 1Sports as a commentator in I-League.

Later, he has commentated in the 2022 FIFA World Cup, along with La Liga, the Premier League, the FIFA U-17 Women's World Cup and the Indian Premier League.

== See also ==
- Football in India
