= India national football team at the Asian Games =

Sporting event delegation

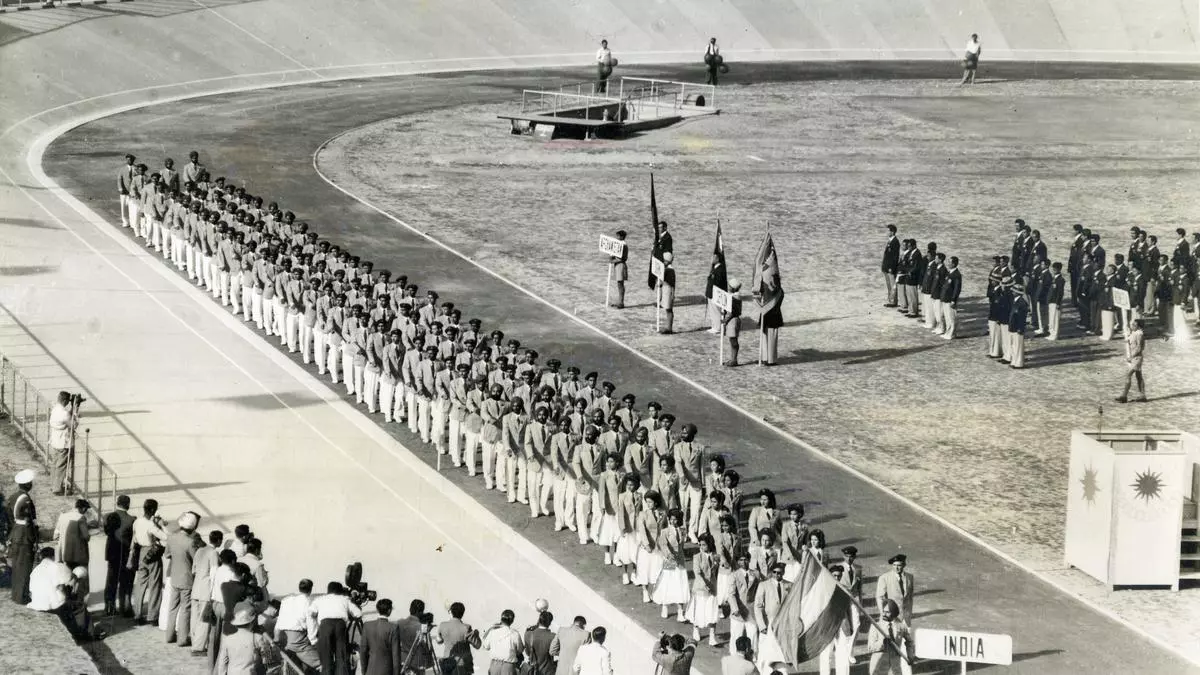
The Indian team marching into National Stadium for the opening ceremony of the first Asian Games, held in New Delhi on 4 March 1951

The Asian Games is Asia's multi-sport event, normally held every four years. The games are regulated by the Olympic Council of Asia (OCA) and recognized by the International Olympic Committee (IOC). Football was first introduced as a sport at the inaugural edition of the Asian Games, which was held in India in 1951. The India national team hosted five other national teams, winning the competition to become the first Asian football champions; the AFC Asian Cup began in 1956, two years after the formation of the Asian Football Confederation (AFC). India competed in eleven Asian Games between 1951 and 1998, missing the 1990 and 1994 games. The team won a gold medal at the 1962 Games and a bronze in 1970. For the 2002 Busan Asian Games, the rules were changed so that only under-23 national teams were allowed to compete. India's U-23 national team has not yet won a medal at the Asian Games.

== Background ==
The Asian Games is Asia's continental multi-sport event, held every four years. The Asian Games Federation (AGF) organizing the games from the first edition in New Delhi until 1978. After the breakup of the AGF, the Olympic Council of Asia (OCA) has organized the games since 1982. The games, recognized by the International Olympic Committee (IOC), are described as the world's second-largest multi-sport event (after the Olympic Games). The 1951 Asian Games are considered the successor of the Far Eastern Games and the Western Asiatic Games. The Far Eastern Games were held nine times between 1913 and 1938 in Japan, the Philippines, and mainland China. The 1938 games in Osaka were cancelled due to the Second Sino-Japanese War (which became part of World War II), and the Far Eastern Games were then discontinued. During the early 1930s, efforts were made to organize a multi-sport event to include the countries of West Asia. This gave birth to the Orient Championship Games, which was renamed the Western Asiatic Games before its first inception. The games' geographic scope included the countries east of Suez and west of Singapore. The first edition was held in Delhi in 1934 at the Irwin Amphitheater, and four countries—Afghanistan, British India, Palestine Mandate, and Ceylon—participated. The decision was made to hold these games every four years, at the midpoint between the Summer Olympics. The 1938 Western Asiatic Games, scheduled to be held in Tel Aviv, were cancelled and abandoned with the outbreak of World War II. Football was one of eight sports played at the inaugural edition of the Asiad in New Delhi, and has been part of every edition since.

== Golden era ==
=== 1951: Host and champion ===
==== Draws and rules ====
Guru Dutt Sondhi, chair of the executive committee for the first Asiad, hosted a New Delhi conference on February 25, 1951, where the draw for the 1951 Asian Games was held. At the conference, it was announced that Afghanistan, Burma, India, Indonesia, Iran and Japan would participate in the tournament. Matches would be played in two 30-minute halves with a five-minute interval, and 15 minutes of extra time with a one-minute interval when a result is not produced within regulation time. Japan and Afghanistan received byes to the quarterfinals. The winner of the Iran-Burma match would play Japan, and the winner of the India-Indonesia match would play Afghanistan. The Philippines withdrew from the tournament before the draw. All matches were played at National Stadium in New Delhi.

==== First Asia champion ====
India played barefoot on a pitch that measured 65 by 110 yards (59 by 101 m), slightly narrower than international standards. However, FIFA had granted prior approval for the use of the pitch. On 5 March 1951, India made its Asian Games football debut against Indonesia with Sailen Manna as captain and Syed Abdul Rahim as coach. India's off season lacked match practice, and their passing and understanding were poor in the opening quarter. Indian forwards Sheoo Mewalal and Pansanttom Venkatesh pressured the Indonesian defense from the start, however, with good passes by center–half Chandan Singh Rawat. The score remained goalless until the 27th minute when Singh passed to Venkatesh, who sent the ball into the six-yard box towards Mewalal. Mewalal headed the ball past the goalkeeper to give India the lead, the first Indian goal-scorer at the Asian Games. India settled down in the second half; in the 42nd minute a corner kick by Mewalal was deflected off Indonesian right–back Chairuddin Siregar into the net, giving India a 2–0 lead. Three minutes later, Indian outside–left Puthanparambil Saleh ran down the wing; his shot rebounded off the bar. Mewalal tapped the ball to Venkatesh, who scored his first goal to give India a 3–0 victory and a place in the semi-finals.

India had a 2–3–5 formation against Iran at the 1951 Asian Games gold–medal match

Rahim made three changes to his team for the semi-final match against Afghanistan on 7 March. Kenchappa Varadaraj replaced Berland Anthony in goal, T. Shanmugham replaced Muhammad Noor in midfield, and Santosh Nandy replaced Saleh at left wing. Afghanistan had a physical, rough playing style; two players were sent off the field, and two more were cautioned by the referee. (Note: Yellow and red cards were incorporated into the Laws of the Game for the 1970 FIFA World Cup.) India forwards Mewalal and Venkatesh continued to impress with their runs, passing, ball control, and shooting, resulting in another 3–0 victory before about 15,000 spectators.

The first goal came in the 10th minute when Mewalal passed to Venkatesh, who shot from outside the penalty box. They reversed roles for the second goal, with Venkatesh setting up Mewalal for a shot to the far corner of the net in the 16th minute. India continued to dominate in the second half, but several shots hit the crossbar. The third goal for India followed a goalmouth melee, with Nandy scoring to send India to the final.

India played in a 2–3–5 formation throughout the tournament. In the final against Iran on 10 March, goalkeeper Anthony was brought back into the starting lineup. The match was dull and scrappy from the start, with the barefooted Indian players reluctant to tackle the booted Iranians. The 25,000 spectators were disappointed with India's first-half performance. The defense of captain Manna, T. Papen and goalkeeper Anthony, however, was praised for saving three goal-scoring chances. Rawat was clinical in his tackling and clearances, and his consistent passes to the forward line were valuable. Inside-right Guha Thakurta and Mewalal kept the Iranian defense busy in the first half. India scored in the 34th minute; Thakurta sent in a cross from the right wing, which Mewalal trapped and volleyed into the net. India defeated Iran in the final for their first-ever Asian Games gold medal and Asia championship. Mewalal was the tournament's highest goalscorer. (Note: Mewalal scored the winning goal, but almost missed the final. A day before the match, he was notified about a family member's death and wanted to leave for Calcutta. Rahim could not dissuade him, but Prime Minister Jawaharlal Nehru intervened and Mewalal stayed. Nehru and President Rajendra Prasad were present for the match; a fan of Mewalal and sports, Nehru ensured that an Indian Air Force Dakota plane at Safdarjung Airport be kept waiting to take off. After the medal ceremony in the evening of the final match, Mewalal flew back to Calcutta to join his grieving family.)

=== 1954: Early exit ===
The 1954 Asian Games were held in Manila in May. On 1 May, the draws for the tournament were announced. Twelve teams participated, seven for the first time. India was drawn in Group C with Indonesia and Japan. The winners of each three-team group would advance to the semifinals; the winners of the semifinals would play for the gold medal, and the losers of the semifinals would play for the bronze medal. Match length was increased to 80 minutes, with two 40-minute halves. India were the defending champions. Memory of the squad's worst defeat (1–10 against Yugoslavia at the 1952 Olympics) was still fresh, although they had won the 1953 Colombo Cup a few months earlier. The team was led by Manna and managed by Balaidas Chatterjee.

India won the first group match against Japan, 3–2. Centre-forward Syed Moinuddin scored two goals, and right-out Joe D'Sa scored one. Japan's two goals were scored by right–in Takashi Takabayashi and centre-forward Taizo Kawamoto. On 3 May, however, India was defeated in the next (and final) group match by Indonesia 0–4. Indonesia forwards Djamiat Dhalhar and Andi Ramang scored a brace, giving India an early exit from the tournament. (Note: According to Indian football journalist and commentator Novy Kapadia, the Indian players were already tired before the May games (the end of India's football season). The matches were played under floodlights, to which Indian players were unaccustomed.)

=== 1958: Misfortune ===
India bounced back at the 1958 Asian Games under coach T. Shome. Fourteen teams participated, with Israel and Malaya making their debut. The matches had two 45-minute halves, with an additional 30 minutes if tied in a knockout game. India was drawn in Group B with Burma and Indonesia, and the top two teams advanced to the knockout stage. They began the group stage with a 3–2 win against Burma, with Chuni Goswami, Tulsidas Balaram and D. Damodaran scoring. In the second match, Indonesia repeated their 1954 Asiad victory with a 2–1 win; Thio Him Tjiang scored twice for Indonesia, and Mohammed Rahmatullah scored for India. India defeated Hong Kong 5–2 in the quarterfinals, with Rahmatullah scoring twice and Goswami, Balaram, and Damodaran scoring once. This gave India a medal chance, since Hong Kong was the third-seeded team in the tournament.

India lost to South Korea 1–3 in the semifinals, unable to overcome tired legs from the previous matches. The players lacked coordination, and strikers could not convert passes from the wingers. Few chances were created by India, and the Korean defense (including goalkeeper Ham Heung-chul) was well-organized. Rahmatullah scored India's only goal in the first half, and Choi Chung-min, Lee Soo-nam and Moon Jung-sik scored for South Korea in the second half. India faced Indonesia again in the bronze-medal match, losing 4–1 before 45,000 spectators. Although India attacked well in the first half, their execution failed. Indonesia scored their first goal in the 10th minute with a corner kick by Saari, who curled the ball into the net; Balaram equalized for India in the first minute of the second half from a penalty kick. However, Omo Suratmo and Wowo Sunaryo scored two goals in the 59th and 60th minutes for Indonesia. Phwa Sian Liong finished off a solo run to score Indonesia's fourth (and final) goal in the 88th minute.

=== 1962: The Golden Trio ===
==== Overview and draws ====
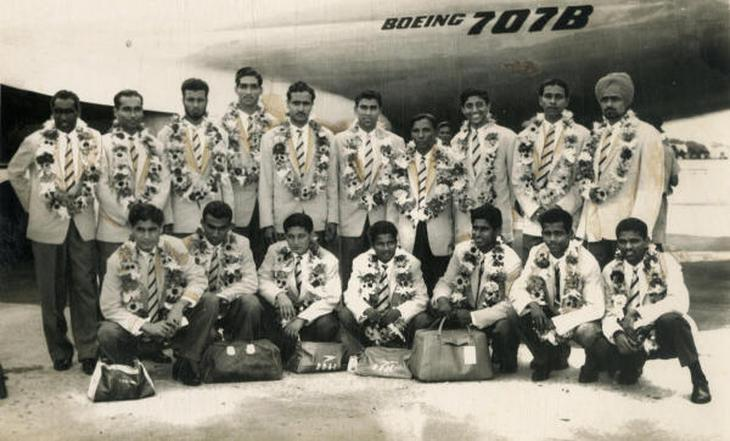
The Indian squad before their departure for Jakarta and the 1962 Asiad

The Ministry of Finance nearly pruned the football team from the Indian contingent for the 1962 Asian Games as an austerity measure. After several rounds of talks with the Indian Olympic Association (IOA), however, the ministry approved the team's participation.

The initial draw was conducted on 14 August 1962. Eleven teams were drawn in four groups, including defending champion Republic of China. Indonesia, the host country, denied visas to the delegations from Israel and the Republic of China for political and diplomatic reasons; this led the International Amateur Athletic Federation and the International Weightlifting Federation to withdraw their sanction for the games.

Indian sports administrator Guru Dutt Sondhi, vice-president of the Asian Games Federation (AGF) and the IOC observer at the 1962 games, said that they should not be called the "Fourth Asian Games" to safeguard the competition's status. This was misinterpreted by the game organizers, the Indonesian press and government and the people, who became hostile towards the Indian contingent. (Note: Indonesia succumbed to pressure from Arab countries who wanted an expulsion of Israel, and from the People's Republic of China for the expulsion of Republic of China (Taiwan) and South Korea from the games. This was against AGF rules and Indonesia's promise to invite all federation members, including those with whom it had no diplomatic relations (Israel, Republic of China and South Korea). Not allowing Israel and Taiwan, accredited by the AGF (recognized by the IOC as the games' organiser), jeopardized IOC recognition of the Asian Games; this would have affected all athletes and sportsmen, who would be subject to disqualification from IOC events (including the Olympic Games). Indonesia invited South Korea to participate.) A revised draw was held on 24 August 1962, with eight teams divided into two groups. India was in Group B with Thailand, Japan, and South Korea. The draw included provisions for the possible participation of Israel and the Republic of China.

==== Second gold: Indian football's greatest achievement ====
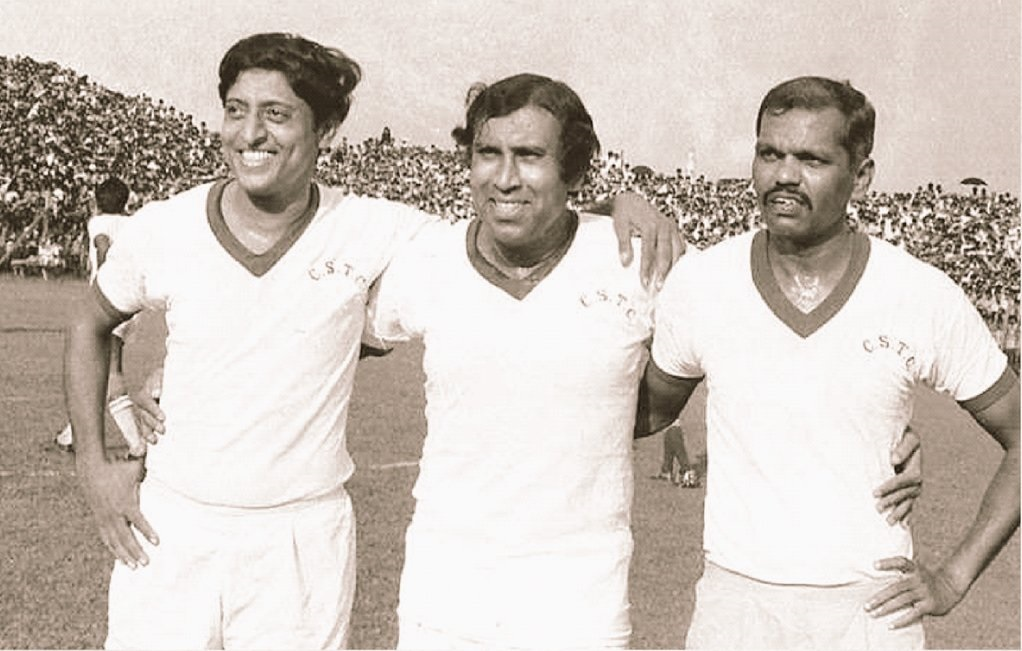
(left to right) Goswami, Banerjee and Balaram, the Golden Trio of Indian football, won gold at the 1962 Asian Games.

After Balaidas Chatterjee and T. Shome failed to give India a medal in the previous two outings, Syed Abdul Rahim was again given responsibility for the team in the 1962 Asiad. Since Rahim guided India to the first Asian Games gold medal and the semi–finals of the 1956 Olympics (India's best Olympics result to date), the team was expected to perform well. Rahim (who had cancer) had the best possible forward line of P. K. Banerjee, Chuni Goswami, Tulsidas Balaram, who became known as the "golden trio of Indian football". Rahim's squad also had the best defense line, which included Jarnail Singh, Arun Ghosh, Chandrashekar Menon and Trilok Singh.

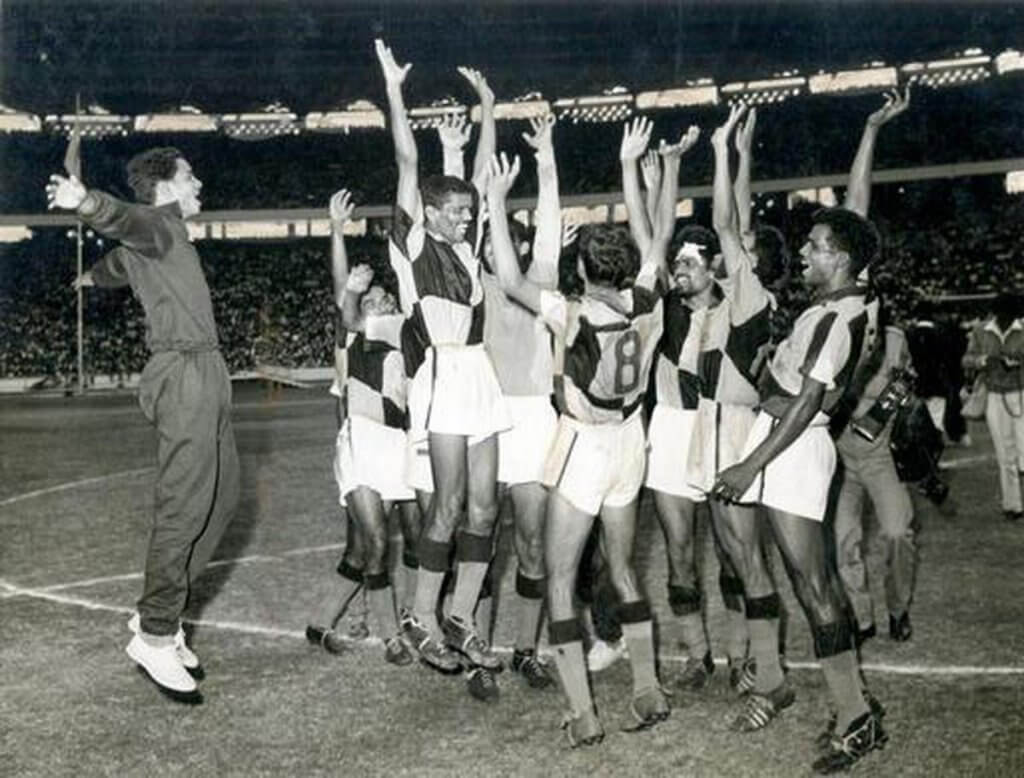
The Indian team celebrates after defeating South Korea in the final of the 1962 Asiad at Senayan Main Stadium in Jakarta.

He used the 3–2–5 formation in the first match against South Korea, who had won the 1960 AFC Asian Cup. South Korea dominated the match, defeating India 2–0. In the early minutes, Indian forward Goswami failed to convert several chances when Balaram passed him the ball at the goalmouth. Korea impressed the 95,000 spectators with better ball control, tactics and quick passes. Forward Chung Soon-choon volleyed the ball from a corner kick in the 30th minute for their first goal. In the second half, Korean inside–out Cha Tae-sung beat Indian goalkeeper Pradyut Barman for his team's second goal. In the second match, against Thailand, India had better gameplay and won 4–1. Center–back Jarnail Singh was injured in a head collision, however; he was stretchered off, needed several stitches, and India was one man down. (Note: Substitution was not then used in the Asian Games.)

P. K. Banerjee scored a brace, and Chuni Goswami and Tulsidas Balaram scored one goal each; Thailand scored one goal. For the last group-stage match, India faced Japan. Although India won, their performance was less impressive than the previous match. During the first half, Japanese forward Saburō Kawabuchi and midfielder Shozo Tsugitani troubled defender Chandrasekhar Menon and goal-keeper Barman several times. India began attacking in the second half, but several chances were missed. Their first goal was in the 54th minute, when Ram Bahadur lobbed the ball in front of the goal to Banerjee, who put it in the net. Balaram scored India's second goal in the 71st minute, when confusion between Japanese goalkeeper Tsukasa Hosaka and his defenders placed the ball at Balaram's feet.

India's 2–3–5 formation against South Korea in the 1962 Asian Games gold–medal match.

India faced South Vietnam, who topped group A, in the semi–final on 1 September. Rahim used a 3–2–5 formation and made two changes; Prasanta Sinha replaced injured Ram Bahadur, and Jarnail Singh was brought in. Singh was positioned as center–forward instead of defender, which helped the team to win the match. India's golden trio began attacking from the start; their first goal was in the 13th minute, when inside-left Goswami scored from a pass from left winger Balaram. Balaram again created a chance in the 18th minute, but the ball hit the post. He continued his attack, dribbling the ball through the Vietnamese defense and taking a 20th-minute shot which went wide of the net. P. K. Banerjee took a 30th-minute free kick, which was saved by Vietnamese goalkeeper Pham Van Rang. The Indian forwards then increased their attacks, and a Banerjee header barely missed the net. India scored their second goal in the 41st minute, when defender-turned-striker Singh rushed through the defense and tapped the ball from three yards out. In the second half, Vietnam began attacking to even the score. Vietnam's first goal was in the 52nd minute, when left–back Phan Duong Cam scored from a penalty kick. Inside–right Do Thol Vinh shot several times before finding success in the 64th minute, when he flicked a ball into the net after a melee with the Indian defenders. Goswami scored the final goal of the match in the 75th minute, when his soft lob cleared goalkeeper Van Rang and sent India to the Asiad final for the second time.

In the final, on 4 September, India again faced South Korea. Rahim played a 2–3–5 formation with goalkeeper Peter Thangaraj. Thangaraj played an important role in the match, saving several shots from Koreans attacking from all directions. The crowd of 100,000 was generally hostile to India, booing throughout the match but cheering Thangaraj's saves. (Note: A mob broke into the Indian embassy during the games, ransacking and torching it, and the stadium crowd booed during the playing of India's national anthem.) (Note: India had an unexpected group of supporters in the gallery: the Pakistan national hockey team.) He was beaten in the 85th minute by Korean inside–right Cha Tae-sung for Korea's only goal. India had had a 2–0 lead, with both goals scored in the first half. The first was in the 17th minute, when team captain Goswami scored from a melee at the goalmouth. Jarnail Singh, who had been switched to forward from defense, had a bandaged head from a previous-match injury. He scored the second goal, lobbing the ball over Korean goalkeeper Ham Heung-chul. India won 2–1, for the team's second Asian Games gold medal. It is considered the greatest achievement of the Indian national team, which overcame participation uncertainties, a hostile host, injury, and the defending Asian champion South Korea.

== 1966: Setback ==
After the 1962 victory, India did well in the Merdeka and was runner-up at the 1964 AFC Asian Cup. With Rahim's untimely death and the early retirement of Goswami and Balaram, however, they were not the 1966 Asiad favorites despite their status as defending champions. India was drawn in a difficult group with Iran, Japan and Malaysia, playing for coach Mohammed Hussain and captained by Jarnail Singh. They won one match, 2–1, against Malaysia. India lost to Japan and Iran by scores of 2–1 and 4–1, respectively, and did not move up to the knockout stage.

== 1970: Swan song ==
Four years later, at the 1970 Bangkok Games, India won the bronze medal. It was the team's last hurrah before its performance declined for almost four decades. The team was coached by G. M. H. Basha and managed by 1962 gold medalist P. K. Banerjee; Syed Nayeemuddin was team captain. The games were originally scheduled to take place in Islamabad, Pakistan, but nine months before they began they were moved to Bangkok. The tournament was shortened to ten days, with India playing six matches in nine days. For the preliminary round, India was drawn with host Thailand and South Vietnam. With a 2–2 draw against Thailand and a 2–0 win against South Vietnam, India moved to the quarter–final round. The 10 December match against Thailand, before 50,000 spectators on a pitch slippery from drizzle, was critical for India. The squad were two goals down by the 21st minute before forward Subhash Bhowmick scored a brace to equalize and barely missed a match-winning hat trick. In the second match, against South Vietnam the following day, Mohammed Habib and Magan Singh Rajvi scored one goal each.

The quarter–final was played in two groups. India was placed in group A with Indonesia and Japan. They dominated the first match 3–0 against Indonesia on 15 December, with Doraiswamy Nataraj, Rajvi and Shyam Thapa scoring a goal apiece. India lost the 17 December match against Japan when forward Takeo Kimura scored the lone Japanese goal in the 88th minute. With one win and one loss, India was runner–up in the group and moved on the semi–final against group B winners Burma the following day.

Burma, the defending champions, were the favorites; as expected, their better skills, passing and attacking won the match against India. Burmese striker Ye Nyunt scored a brace for his team to reach the final, and India moved on to the 19 December bronze-medal match against Japan. Japan was the favorite, since they had defeated India in the group match. India won by a solitary goal, however, scored by Manjit Singh. The result was helped by India's defenders; right–back Sudhir Karmakar marked Japanese striker Kunishige Kamamoto so skillfully that FIFA president Stanley Rous called Karmakar "Asia's best defender" and India "the most skillful team of the tournament". This was the India senior national team's last medal at the Asian Games.

== Decline ==
=== 1974: Worst outing ===
India's performance sharply declined after 1970, so much so that the senior national team never finished in the top four from the 1974 to the 1998 Asiads. The decline began with a bad outing at the 1971 Merdeka Tournament, where they were defeated 9–0 by Burma on 6 August 1971. This was followed by a poor performance at the 1972 Summer Olympics qualifications. They did not even take part in the 1972 AFC Asian Cup qualification. India was not among the favorites for the 1974 tournament, despite their 1970 bronze medal. Although coach Basha and manager Banerjee remained with the team with players Bhowmick, Habib, Thapa, Nataraj and Rajvi, their poor performance continued in 1974. India was drawn in Group B for the preliminary round with Iraq, China and North Korea. India lost all the three matches: 0–3 to Iraq, 1–7 to China and 1–4 to North Korea. The match against China was the team's worst defeat in the Asian Games; the 1974 games were the team's worst, with 14 goals conceded. Rajvi scored two goals, one each against China and North Korea.

=== 1978 to 1994 ===
In 1978, India was coached by Arun Ghosh and Gurdev Singh Gill was the team captain. India was drawn in Group A of the preliminary round with Malaysia and Bangladesh, losing 0–1 to Malaysia and defeating Bangladesh 3–0 victory. Bidesh Bose, Harjinder Singh and Xavier Pius scored one goal each. With one win and one loss, India moved to the next round and faced Kuwait, North Korea and Iraq. Kuwait defeated India 6–1, North Korea defeated India 3–1 and Iraq also won, preventing India from advancing. Surajit Sengupta scored the lone goal for India against Kuwait, and A. Devraj Doraiswamy scored their only goal against North Korea.

India hosted the 1982 Asian Games in New Delhi. P. K. Banerjee was appointed coach, and Bhaskar Ganguly became team captain. Sixteen teams participated in the football tournament. India was drawn in Group C for the preliminary round with Bangladesh, China and Malaysia. They defeated Bangladesh 2–0, Malaysia 1–0, and drew 2–2 against China to move to the knockouts. Prasun Banerjee scored in the early and final minutes against Bangladesh, and Kartick Seth scored the lone goal against Malaysia in the 68th minute; Shabbir Ali and Seth scored in the 53rd and 60th minutes, respectively, against China. India faced Group A runner–up Saudi Arabia in the quarter–finals. Despite the home advantage, India was defeated; Ahmed Bayazid scored the winning goal in the 89th minute to reach the semi–finals.

The team's poor performance continued in 1986. India lost all its group matches (conceding eight goals) for the first time since 1974. South Korea won 3–0 on 20 September, China won 2–1 on 22 September, and Bahrain won 3–0 four days later. Debashish Mishra scored India's only goal, against China.

One reason for the downfall of the Indian football team was a rift between the All India Football Federation (AIFF) and the Calcutta clubs, players and coaches. Since India would host the 1982 Asian Games, the AIFF began preparations by giving international exposure (with longer camps) to the senior team near the end of 1980; this led to a dispute between the Calcutta Football League clubs and the AIFF, which did not realize that if the players remained with national team instead of representing the clubs, they would incur a financial loss. Most of the players from Bengal left the national camp and, although the matter was later resolved, preparations were hampered. (Note: India's preparations were hindered as players chose clubs with whom they had contracts over the national team. Twenty-one players (nineteen of whom were from Bengal) left the national camp on 19 February 1981. The walkout was criticized by Prime Minister Indira Gandhi and West Bengal Chief Minister Jyoti Basu. All India Council of Sports president Sam Manekshaw persuaded the AIFF to reimburse the national-duty players by ₹2,000 per month. After two months, the players returned to the national camp.) Before the 1986 Asian Games, controversy arose about the selection of team captain. Coach P. K. Banerjee appointed defender Sudip Chatterjee captain, but midfielder Prasanta Banerjee said that he should have been given the position because of his seniority. Chatterjee remained captain; Banerjee claimed an injury and did not want to play, which divided the team. Manager P. P. Lakshmanan wrote a report critical of the Bengal players' attitude, and the Indian Olympic Association (IOA) withdrew the national team from the 1990 and 1994 games.

=== 1998: Last senior-team participation ===
After missing the 1990 and 1994 games, the senior national team took part in the Asian Games in 1998 for the last time. The IOA authorized the team if the government would not bear the expenses. Syed Nayeemuddin was the coach, and the team was managed by Chuni Goswami; I. M. Vijayan was the team captain. Jo Paul Ancheri scored one goal. In a single match he played three position. India began well in the preliminary round. In the first match, on 3 December against Japan, they lost by a solitary goal scored by Japanese forward Kenji Fukuda. In the second match, on 5 December, India earned three points from a win against Nepal and moved to the second round; Carlton Chapman scored India's only goal. India then lost all their second-round matches: a 3–2 loss to Turkmenistan, a 2–0 defeat by Uzbekistan, and a 2–0 loss to North Korea. Vijayan and Tushar Rakshit scored for India against Turkmenistan.

== Under-23 team ==
=== 2002: New rules ===
As the turn of the century, the OCA changed the participation rules for the Asian Games. The age of the players was limited to 23, with three over-age players allowed on each squad; this was similar to the participation rules for the Summer Olympics. (Note: Until the 1980 Olympics, only amateur players were eligible to play. Professional footballers were allowed by the IOC for the first time in 1984 if they had not participated in a FIFA World Cup match. Most countries fielded young professional players for the 1984 and the 1988 games. This led to a new regulation, agreed by the IOC and FIFA, that under-23 players could participate from the 1992 Games onwards.) The 2002 Asian Games were held in Busan, South Korea, in September. The football tournament was the first in which under–23 teams participated. Similar to the 1998 games, the team was allowed to participate if the government did not have to pay. India was drawn in Group C with Bangladesh, Turkmenistan and China and defeated Bangladesh and Turkmenistan 3-0 and 3–1, respectively. Captain Bhaichung Bhutia played well, scoring two goals against each team. In the third match, on 3 October, India lost to China and finished as group runner-up. Despite earning six points from the two wins, the team did not move on to the knockouts due to a lower goal differential than other second-place teams.

=== 2006–present ===
The Indian football team almost missed a place in the 2006 Guanzhou games because a criterion was adopted allowing squads for team sports only if they had a fourth–to–sixth-place finish in the previous edition. The team was allowed, however, under condition that the AIFF would pay its expenses. Bob Houghton was the coach, and Bhutia was the team captain. India was drawn with Hong Kong, the Maldives and defending champion Iran. India had a 1–1 draw against Hong Kong, a 2–1 victory against the Maldives, and a 2–0 defeat by Iran.

Four years later, at the 2010 Doha games India again played poorly. The team was drawn in Group D with Kuwait, Qatar and Singapore. Kuwait defeated India 2–0, and Qatar won 2–1. Dharmaraj Ravanan scored India's only goal. In the third match, against Singapore, India won 4–1. Jewel Raja, Balwant Singh, Jibon Singh, and Manish Maithani each scored one goal. India reached the round of 16 as the best third-place team. In the knockouts, however (their first appearance since 1982), they lost 5–0 to Japan.

The Indian Sports Ministry was initially reluctant to send the team to the 2014 Asian Games, but later relented. India had their worst outing since the under-23 team competed, conceding seven goals in two matches against the United Arab Emirates (UAE) and Jordan in Group H. In the first match, the UAE defeated India 5–0. Jordan defeated India 2–0 in the second match, preventing them from moving on to the round of 16.

The IOA did not allow the team to participate in the 2018 Asian Games, saying that they were incapable of winning a medal. The association did not allow the AIFF to pay the team's expenses. Four years later, a similar situation arose. The national football team almost missed a place at the Hangzhou Games, held in September 2023. The Sports Ministry allowed squads for team sports only if they were among Asia's top eight. The India senior national team was ranked 18th in Asia, but FIFA does not rank under–age national teams.

Indian football fans began a campaign on social media, with hashtags supporting their cause. India team coach Igor Štimac reached out to the government of India for intervention with an open letter on social media. This led to a meeting of the AIFF and the ministry, which allowed the team to participate in light of their performances at the 2023 Tri-Nation Series, Intercontinental Cup and SAFF Championship. Although the team was allowed, the main under–23 squad was missing; 11 of 22 players originally named to the final squad withdrew because of their club's refusal to release them. The AIFF asked Football Sports Development Limited to postpone the 2023–24 Indian Super League so the players could participate and have a practice camp before the games; the company refused, and the team played without a single practice session.

The 19th Asian Games, scheduled for 10–25 September 2022 in Hangzhou, was postponed due to the COVID-19 pandemic and was held from 23 September to 8 October 2023. However, the group stage of the football tournament began on 19 September. The draw for the Hangzhou Games was held on 27 July, and India was drawn in Group A with host China, Bangladesh and Myanmar.

In the group stage, India lost 5–1 to China. They won 1–0 against Bangladesh and drew 1–1 draw against Myanmar, earning four points to reach the knockouts. India ended their tournament with a 2–0 loss to Saudi Arabia in the round of 16.

== Record ==
From its inception in 1951, the football tournament at the Asian Games was played by the senior teams until 1998. The IOC and AFC changed the rules of participation in 2002, and allowed under-23 players (and three players over age 23) on a squad.

Asian Games record
Host/Year	Result	Position	Pld	W	D	L	GF	GA	Squad	Ref.
(India) 1951	Champions	1st	3	3	0	0	7	0	Squad	
(Philippines) 1954	Round 1	8th	2	1	0	1	3	6	Squad	
(Japan) 1958	Semi-finals	4th	5	2	0	3	11	13	Squad	
(Indonesia) 1962	Champions	1st	5	4	0	1	11	6	Squad	
(Thailand) 1966	Round 1	8th	3	1	0	2	4	7	Squad	
(Thailand) 1970	Third Place	3rd	6	3	1	2	8	5	Squad	
(Iran) 1974	Round 1	13th	3	0	0	3	2	14	Squad	
(Thailand) 1978	Round 2	8th	5	1	0	4	5	13	Squad	
(India) 1982	Quarter-finals	6th	4	2	1	1	5	3	Squad	
(South Korea) 1986	Round 1	16th	3	0	0	3	1	8	Squad	
(China) 1990	Withdrew									
(Japan) 1994	Indian Olympic Association did not allow team's participation									
(Thailand) 1998	Round 2	16th	5	1	0	4	3	8	Squad	
Played by India national under-23 football team onwards
(South Korea) 2002	Group stage	10th of 24	3	2	0	1	6	3	Squad	
(Qatar) 2006	Group stage	14th of 28	3	1	1	1	3	4	Squad	
(China) 2010	Round of 16	14th of 28	4	1	0	3	5	10	Squad	
(South Korea) 2014	Group stage	26th of 32	2	0	0	2	0	7	Squad	
(Indonesia) 2018	Indian Olympic Association did not allow team's participation									
(China) 2022 #	Round of 16	9th of 21	4	1	1	2	3	8	Squad	
Total	Champions	16 / 19	60	23	4	33	77	115		
Champions Third place Fourth place Tournament played fully or partially on home soil # Postponed due to COVID-19 pandemic & held in 2023.

== Match summary ==
India has scored the most goals against Hong Kong in a 5–2 victory in the quarter-finals of the 1958 Asiad. The most goals the team conceded were in a 1–7 loss against China in the preliminary round of the 1974 Asiad.

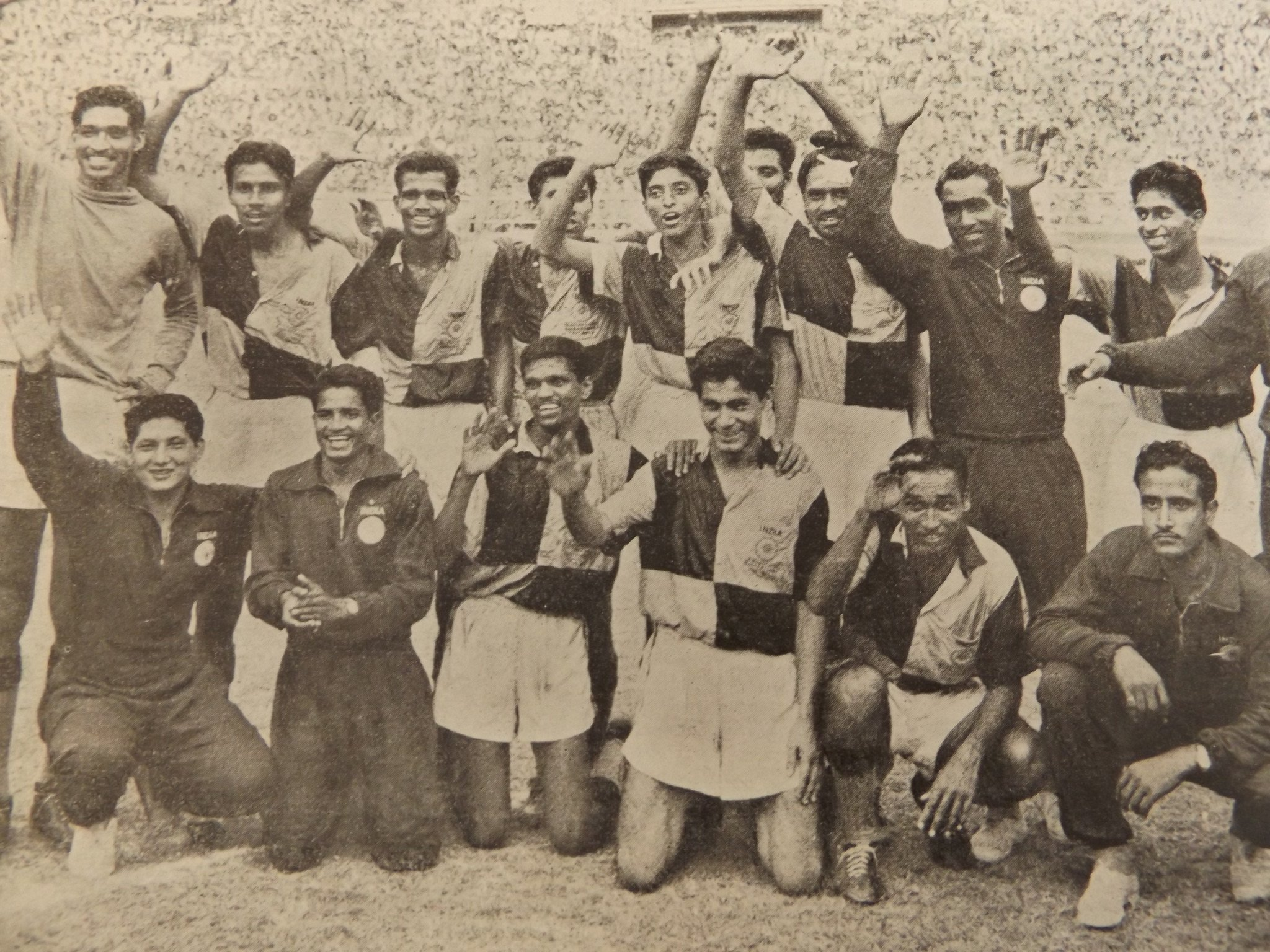
India national team after defeating South Korea in the final of 1962 Asiad at Senayan Main Stadium, Jakarta.

Asian Games match history
Year	Round	Score	Result	Ref.
1951	Quarter-final †	India 3–0 Indonesia	Win	
1951	Semi-finals	India 3–0 Afghanistan	Win	
1951	(gold) medal match	India 1–0 Iran	Win	
1954	Group stage	India 3–2 Japan	Win	
1954	Group stage	India 0–4 Indonesia	Loss	
1958	Group stage	India 3–2 Burma	Win	
1958	Group stage	India 1–2 Indonesia	Loss	
1958	Quarter-finals	India 5–2 Hong Kong	Win	
1958	Semi-finals	India 1–3 South Korea	Loss	
1958	(bronze) medal match	India 1–4 Indonesia	Loss	
1962	Group stage	India 0–2 South Korea	Loss	
1962	Group stage	India 4–1 Thailand	Win	
1962	Group stage	India 2–0 Japan	Win	
1962	Semi-finals	India 3–2 South Vietnam	Win	
1962	(gold) medal match	India 2–1 South Korea	Win	
1966	Group stage	India 1–2 Japan	Loss	
1966	Group stage	India 2–1 Malaysia	Win	
1966	Group stage	India 1–4 Iran	Loss	
1970	Prelim round	India 2–2 Thailand	Draw	
1970	Prelim round	India 2–0 South Vietnam	Win	
1970	Round 2 (Quarter-finals)	India 3–0 Indonesia	Win	
1970	Round 2 (Quarter-finals)	India 0–1 Japan	Loss	
1970	Semi-finals	India 0–2 Burma	Loss	
1970	(bronze) medal match	India 1–0 Japan	Win	
1974	Prelim round	India 0–3 Iraq	Loss	
1974	Prelim round	India 1–7 China	Loss	
1974	Prelim round	India 1–4 North Korea	Loss	
1978	Prelim round	India 0–1 Malaysia	Loss	
1978	Prelim round	India 3–0 Bangladesh	Win	
1978	Round 2 (Quarter-finals)	India 1–6 Kuwait	Loss	
1978	Round 2 (Quarter-finals)	India 1–3 North Korea	Loss	
1978	Round 2 (Quarter-finals)	India 0–3 Iraq	Loss	
1982	Group stage	India 2–0 Bangladesh	Win	
1982	Group stage	India 1–0 Malaysia	Win	
1982	Group stage	India 2–2 China	Draw	
1982	Quarter-finals	India 0–1 Saudi Arabia	Loss	
1986	Group stage	India 0–3 South Korea	Loss	
1986	Group stage	India 1–2 China	Loss	
1986	Group stage	India 0–3 Bahrain	Loss	
1998	Prelim round	India 0–1 Japan	Loss	
1998	Prelim round	India 1–0 Nepal	Win	
1998	Round 2	India 2–3 Turkmenistan	Loss	
1998	Round 2	India 0–2 Uzbekistan	Loss	
1998	Round 2	India 0–2 North Korea	Loss	
Played by India under–23 team onwards
2002	Group stage	India 3–0 Bangladesh	Win	
2002	Group stage	India 3–1 Turkmenistan	Win	
2002	Group stage	India 0–2 China	Loss	
2006	Group stage	India 1–1 Hong Kong	Draw	
2006	Group stage	India 2–1 Maldives	Win	
2006	Group stage	India 0–2 Iran	Loss	
2010	Group stage	India 0–2 Athletes from Kuwait	Loss	
2010	Group stage	India 1–2 Qatar	Loss	
2010	Group stage	India 4–1 Singapore	Win	
2010	Round of 16	India 0–5 Japan	Loss	
2014	Group stage	India 0–5 United Arab Emirates	Loss	
2014	Group stage	India 0–2 Jordan	Loss	
2022	Group stage	India 1–5 China	Loss	
2022	Group stage	India 1–0 Bangladesh	Win	
2022	Group stage	India 1–1 Myanmar	Draw	
2022	Round of 16	India 0–2 Saudi Arabia	Loss	

† There was no group stage in the tournament.

== Goalscorers ==
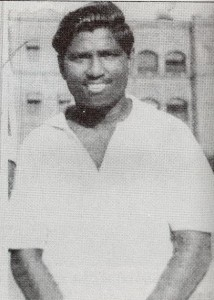
Sheoo Mewalal, first ever Indian to score at the Asian Games. He scored three goals for India.

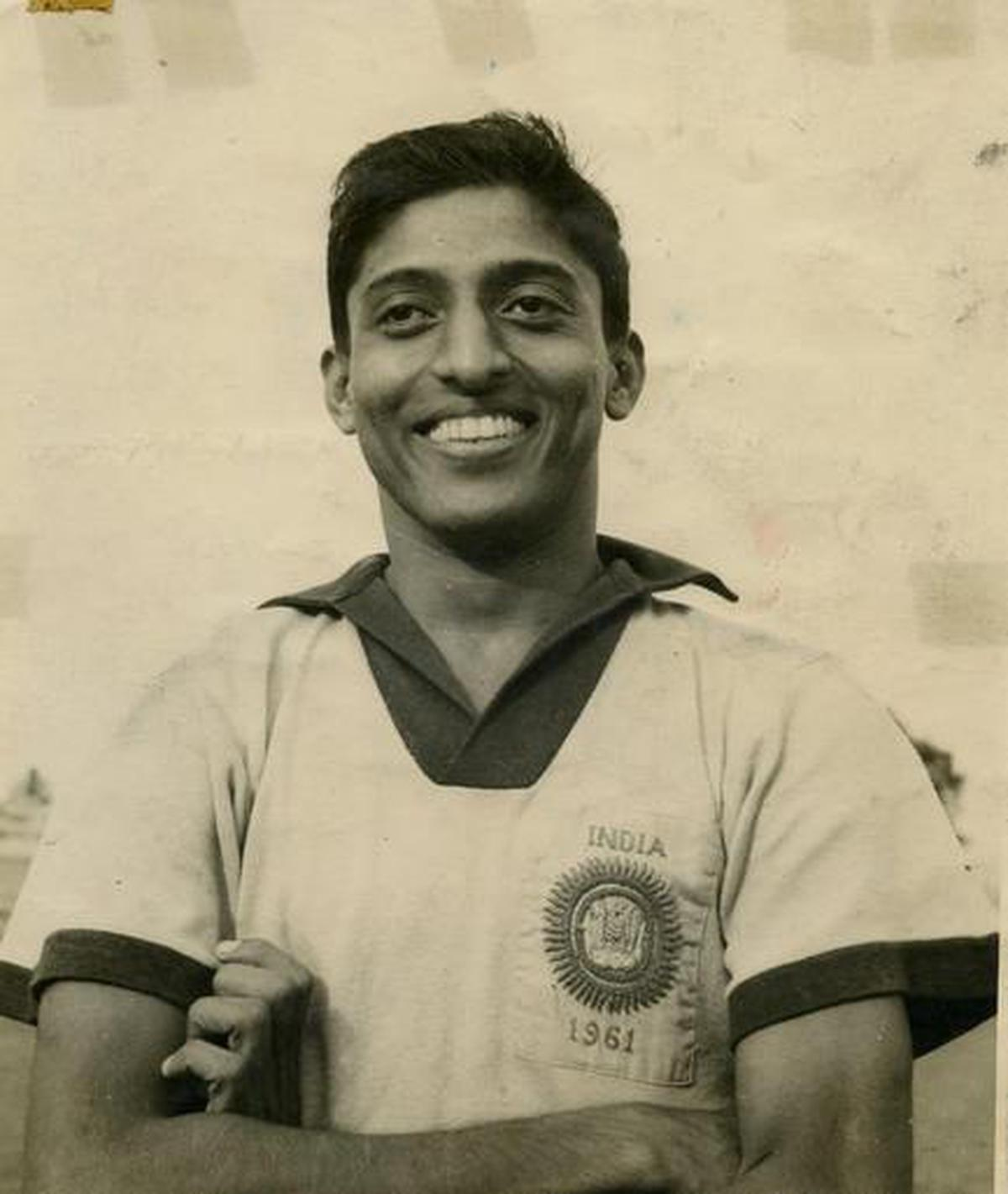

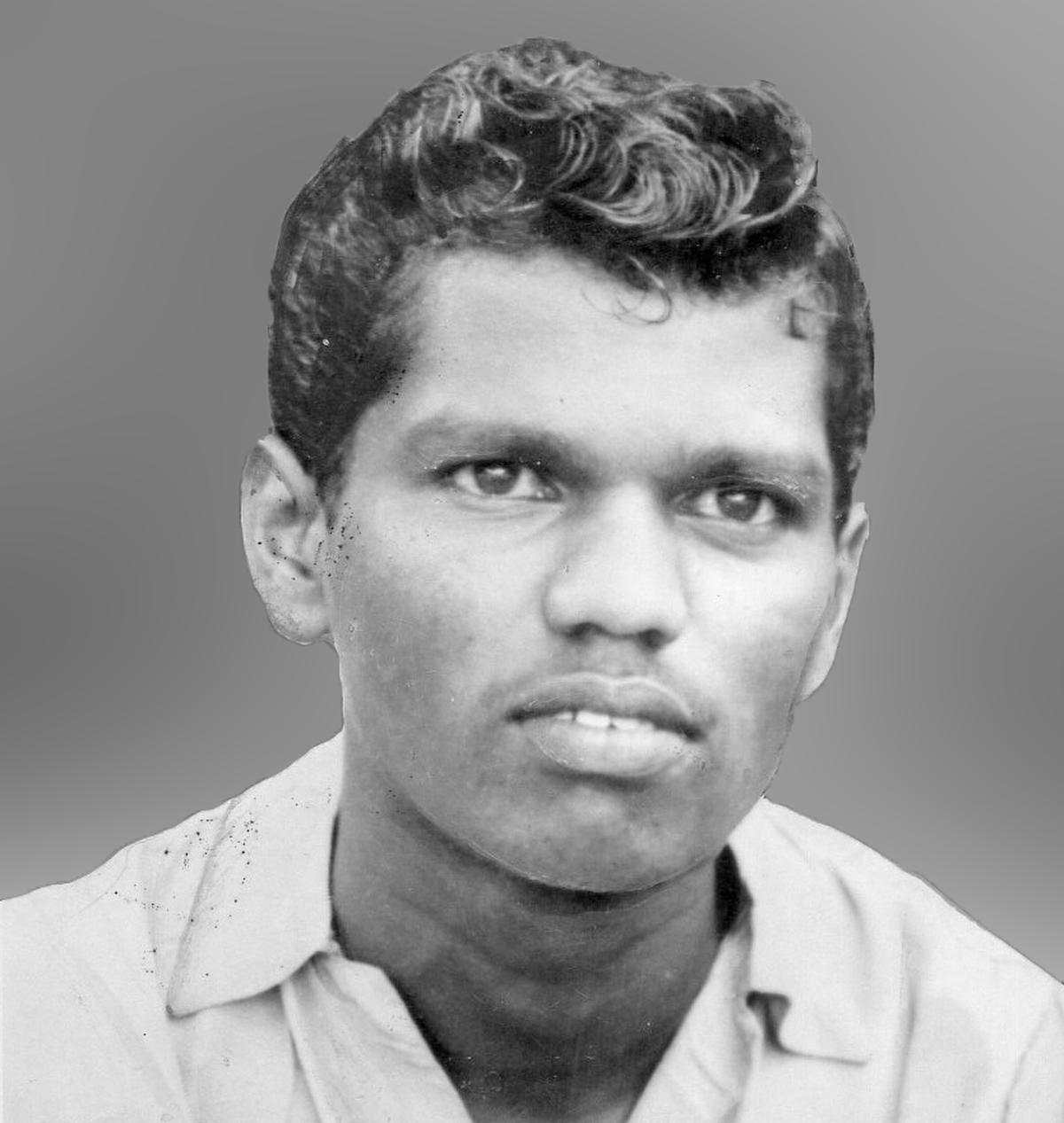
Chuni Goswami (top) and Tulsidas Balaram (bottom) both scored five goals each at the Asian Games, the most by any Indian.

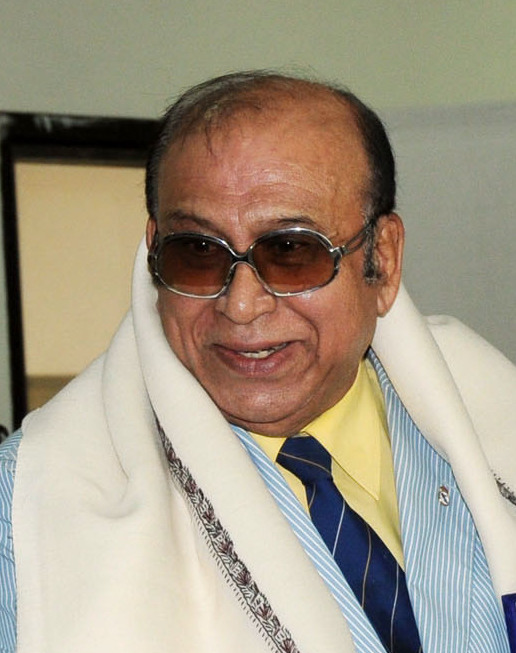
P. K. Banerjee scored four goals at the 1962 Asian Games, the most by an Indian in a single edition.

No.	Player	Venue/Location	Opponent	Date	Edition	Goals	Ref.
1	Sheoo Mewalal	National Stadium, New Delhi	Indonesia	5 March 1951	1951	1	
1	Sheoo Mewalal	National Stadium, New Delhi	Afghanistan	7 March 1951	1951	1	
1	Sheoo Mewalal	National Stadium, New Delhi	Iran	10 March 1951	1951	1	
2	Pansanttom Venkatesh	National Stadium, New Delhi	Indonesia	5 March 1951	1951	1	
2	Pansanttom Venkatesh	National Stadium, New Delhi	Afghanistan	7 March 1951	1951	1	
3	Santosh Nandy	National Stadium, New Delhi	Afghanistan	7 March 1951	1951	1	
4	Syed Moinuddin	Rizal Memorial Stadium, Manila	Japan	3 May 1954	1954	1	
5	Joe D'Sa	Rizal Memorial Stadium, Manila	Japan	3 May 1954	1954	1	
6	Chuni Goswami	Korakuen Velodrome, Tokyo	Burma	26 May 1958	1958	1	
6	Chuni Goswami	Metropolitan Football Stadium, Tokyo	Hong Kong	30 May 1958	1958	1	
6	Chuni Goswami	Senayan Main Stadium, Jakarta	Thailand	28 August 1962	1962	1	
6	Chuni Goswami	Senayan Main Stadium, Jakarta	South Vietnam	1 September 1962	1962	2	
7	Tulsidas Balaram	Korakuen Velodrome, Tokyo	Burma	26 May 1958	1958	1	
7	Tulsidas Balaram	Metropolitan Football Stadium, Tok	Hong Kong	30 May 1958	1958	1	
7	Tulsidas Balaram	Japan National Stadium, Tokyo	Indonesia	1 June 1958	1958	1 ‡	
7	Tulsidas Balaram	Senayan Main Stadium, Jakarta	Thailand	28 August 1962	1962	1	
7	Tulsidas Balaram	Senayan Main Stadium, Jakarta	Japan	29 August 1962	1962	1	
8	D. Damodaran	Korakuen Velodrome, Tokyo	Burma	26 May 1958	1958	1	
8	D. Damodaran	Metropolitan Football Stadium, Tokyo	Hong Kong	30 May 1958	1958	1	
8	D. Damodaran	Japan National Stadium, Tokyo	South Korea	1 June 1958	1958	1 ‡	
9	Mohammed Rahmatullah	Metropolitan Football Stadium, Tokyo	Indonesia	28 May 1958	1958	1	
9	Mohammed Rahmatullah	Metropolitan Football Stadium, Tokyo	Hong Kong	30 May 1958	1958	2	
10	P. K. Banerjee	Senayan Main Stadium	Thailand	28 August 1962	1962	2	
10	P. K. Banerjee	Senayan Main Stadium	Japan	29 August 1962	1962	1	
10	P. K. Banerjee	Senayan Main Stadium	South Korea	4 September 1962	1962	1	
11	Jarnail Singh	Senayan Main Stadium	South Vietnam	1 September 1962	1962	1	
11	Jarnail Singh	Senayan Main Stadium	South Korea	4 September 1962	1962	1	
11	Jarnail Singh	Bangkok, Thailand	Malaysia	12 December 1966	1966	1 ‡	
11	Jarnail Singh	Bangkok, Thailand	Iran	13 December 1966	1966	1	
12	Ashok Chatterjee	Bangkok, Thailand	Japan	10 December 1966	1966	1	
13	Inder Singh	Bangkok, Thailand	Malaysia	12 December 1966	1966	1	
14	Subhash Bhowmick	Bangkok, Thailand	Thailand	10 December 1970	1970	2	
15	Mohammed Habib	Bangkok, Thailand	South Vietnam	11 December 1970	1970	1	
16	Doraiswamy Nataraj	Bangkok, Thailand	Indonesia	15 December 1970	1970	1	
17	Shyam Thapa	Bangkok, Thailand	Indonesia	15 December 1970	1970	1	
18	Manjit Singh	Bangkok, Thailand	Japan	19 December 1970	1970	1	
19	Magan Singh Rajvi	Bangkok, Thailand	South Vietnam	11 December 1970	1970	1	
19	Magan Singh Rajvi	Bangkok, Thailand	Indonesia	15 December 1970	1970	1	
19	Magan Singh Rajvi	Aryamehr Stadium, Tehran	China	4 September 1974	1974	1	
19	Magan Singh Rajvi	Amjadiyeh Stadium, Tehran	North Korea	6 September 1974	1974	1	
20	Bidesh Bose	Bangkok, Thailand	Bangladesh	10 December 1978	1978	1	
21	Hajinder Singh	Bangkok, Thailand	Bangladesh	10 December 1978	1978	1	
22	Xavier Pius	Bangkok, Thailand	Bangladesh	10 December 1978	1978	1	
23	Surajit Sengupta	Bangkok, Thailand	Kuwait	18 December 1978	1978	1	
24	A. Devraj Doraiswamy	Bangkok, Thailand	North Korea	20 December 1978	1978	1	
25	Prasun Banerjee	Jawaharlal Nehru Stadium, New Delhi	Bangladesh	20 November 1982	1982	1	
26	Kartick Seth	Ambedkar Stadium, New Delhi	Malaysia	22 November 1982	1982	1	
26	Kartick Seth	Ambedkar Stadium, New Delhi	China	24 November 1982	1982	1	
27	Shabbir Ali	Ambedkar Stadium, New Delhi	China	24 November 1982	1982	1	
28	Debashish Mishra	Busan Gudeok Stadium, Busan	China	22 September 1986	1986	1	
29	Carlton Chapman	Trang Municipality Stadium, Trang	Nepal	5 December 1998	1998	1	
30	I. M. Vijayan	Trang Municipality Stadium, Trang	Turkmenistan	7 December 1998	1998	1	
31	Tushar Rakshit	Trang Municipality Stadium, Trang	Turkmenistan	7 December 1998	1998	1	
32	Bhaichung Bhutia	Ulsan Munsu Football Stadium, Ulsan	Bangladesh	27 September 2002	2002	2	
32	Bhaichung Bhutia	Yangsan Stadium, Yangsan	Turkmenistan	30 September 2002	2002	2	
33	Renedy Singh	Ulsan Munsu Football Stadium, Ulsan	Bangladesh	27 September 2002	2002	1	
34	Abhishek Yadav	Yangsan Stadium, Yangsan	Turkmenistan	30 September 2002	2002	1	
35	Pappachen Pradeep	Al-Gharafa Stadium, Al-Rayyan	Hong Kong	29 November 2006	2006	1	
36	Sukumar Singh	Al-Sadd Stadium, Doha	Maldives	3 December 2006	2006	1	
37	Subhas Chakrobarty	Al-Sadd Stadium, Doha	Maldives	3 December 2006	2006	1	
38	Dharmaraj Ravanan	Huadu Stadium, Guangzhou	Qatar	9 November 2010	2010	1	
39	Jewel Raja	Huadu Stadium, Guangzhou	Singapore	11 November 2010	2010	1	
40	Balwant Singh	Huadu Stadium, Guangzhou	Singapore	11 November 2010	2010	1	
41	Jibon Singh	Huadu Stadium, Guangzhou	Singapore	11 November 2010	2010	1	
42	Manish Maithani	Huadu Stadium, Guangzhou	Singapore	11 November 2010	2010	1	
43	Rahul K. P.	Huanglong Sports Centre Stadium, Hangzhou	China	19 September 2023	2022	1	
44	Sunil Chhetri	Xiaoshan Sports Centre Stadium, Xiaoshan	Bangladesh	21 September 2023	2022	1 ‡	
44	Sunil Chhetri	Xiaoshan Sports Centre Stadium, Xiaoshan	Myanmar	24 September 2023	2022	1 ‡	

‡ Goal scored from penalty kick.

== See also ==
- India at the AFC Asian Cup
- India national football team at the Olympics
- India at the FIFA World Cup qualification
- History of the India national football team
- Football at the Asian Games
- Football at the Summer Olympics
- AFC U-23 Championship
