= India at the FIFA World Cup qualification =

The India national football team has participated in ten editions of the FIFA World Cup qualification but never participated in the FIFA World Cup.

== Summary ==
FIFA World Cup qualification record
Year	Pld	W	D	L	GF	GA	Notes
(Uruguay) 1930	Did not enter						
(Italy) 1934	Did not enter						
(France) 1938	Did not enter						
(Brazil) 1950	Qualified by default						Group 10 winners (Note: India topped the group after rest of the teams from their group withdrew. But India withdrew from the tournament after having qualified as group champions, due to several reasons such as financial, travel distance, team selection, etc.)
(Switzerland) 1954	Denied by FIFA						(Note: After having withdrawn from previous tournament, FIFA did not allow India to take part in the next edition of the World Cup, hence India were not allowed to participate in the qualification tournament as well.)
(Sweden) 1958 to (Spain) 1982	Did not enter						(Note: AIFF would never send India to the world cup qualification tournament again until 1985.)
(Mexico) 1986	6	2	3	1	7	6	First round (2/4 in Group 3B)
(Italy) 1990	Withdrew						
(United States) 1994	8	1	1	6	8	22	First round (5/5 in Group D)
(France) 1998	3	1	1	1	3	7	First round (3/4 in Group 10)
(South Korea) (Japan) 2002	6	3	2	1	11	5	First round (3/4 in Group 8)
(Germany) 2006	6	1	1	4	2	18	Second round (3/4 in Group 3)
(South Africa) 2010	2	0	1	1	3	6	First round (Lost to Lebanon (6–3) on aggregate)
(Brazil) 2014	2	0	1	1	2	5	Second round (Lost to United Arab Emirates (5–2) on aggregate)
(Russia) 2018	10	2	1	7	7	18	Second round (5/5 in Group D)
(Qatar) 2022	8	1	4	3	6	7	Second round (3/5 in Group E)
(Canada) (Mexico) (United States) 2026	6	1	2	3	3	7	Second round (3/4 in Group A)
Total	57	12	17	28	52	101	

== Tournaments ==
=== 1986 FIFA World Cup qualification (AFC) ===
==== East Asia Zone ====
===== Group 3B =====
Team	Pld	W	D	L	GF	GA	GD	Pts
Indonesia	6	4	1	1	8	4	+4	9
India	6	2	3	1	7	6	+1	7
Thailand	6	1	2	3	4	4	+0	4
Bangladesh	6	2	0	4	5	10	−5	4

Source: RSSSF

21 March 1985	Indonesia	2–1	India	Senayan Stadium, Jakarta
	Nurdiansyah 41', 49'	Report	K. Dey 34'	Attendance: 70,000; Referee: Reynaldo Reyes (Philippines)

26 March 1985	Thailand	0–0	India	Bangkok
		Report		Referee: Shunsaku Nakanishi (Japan)

30 March 1985	Bangladesh	1–2	India	Bangladesh Army Stadium, Dhaka
	Chunnu 42'	Report	Ghosh 34'; Panji 84'	Attendance: 8,000; Referee: Liu Jingli (China)

6 April 1985	India	1–1	Indonesia	Salt Lake Stadium, Calcutta
	Thapa 89'	Report	Dede Sulaiman 20'	Attendance: 10,000; Referee: Farouk Mustafa (Iraq)

9 April 1985	India	1–1	Thailand	Salt Lake Stadium, Calcutta
	K. Dey 85'	Report	Narasek Boongeang 76'	Attendance: 6,000; Referee: Shokor Abdulkader Abdul Latif (Iraq)

12 April 1985	India	2–1	Bangladesh	Salt Lake Stadium, Calcutta
	Panji 36'; Camillo Gonsalves 54'	Report	Bhadra 15'	Attendance: 8,000; Referee: Salih Abdul Karim Saadi (Iraq)

=== 1994 FIFA World Cup qualification (AFC) ===
Group D

Pos	Team	Pld	W	D	L	GF	GA	GD	Pts
1	South Korea	8	7	1	0	23	1	+22	15
2	Bahrain	8	3	3	2	9	6	+3	9
3	Lebanon	8	2	4	2	8	9	−1	8
4	Hong Kong	8	2	1	5	9	19	−10	5
5	India	8	1	1	6	8	22	−14	3

Source: RSSSF

7 May 1993	Lebanon	2–2	India	Beirut, Lebanon
	Babkin Melikian 37'; Jamal Taha 53'	Report	Tejinder Kumar 68'; V. P. Sathyan 82'	Stadium: Bourj Hammoud Stadium; Referee: Nizar Watti (Syria)

11 May 1993	India	1–2	Hong Kong	Beirut, Lebanon
	Bhupinder Thakur 54'	Report	Loh Wai Chi 15'; Lee Kin Wo 59'	Stadium: Bourj Hammoud Stadium; Referee: Qazi Asif (Pakistan)

13 May 1993	India	0–3	South Korea	Beirut, Lebanon
		Report	Hong Myung-Bo 19' (pen.); Choi Moon-Sik 70'; Ha Seok-Ju 89'	Stadium: Bourj Hammoud Stadium; Referee: Al-Hindyani (Kuwait)

15 May 1993	Bahrain	2–1	India	Beirut, Lebanon
	Khamis Thani 4'; Ali Saad 31'	Report	V. P. Sathyan 90' (pen.)	Stadium: Bourj Hammoud Stadium; Referee: Qazi Asif (Pakistan)

7 June 1993	India	0–3	Bahrain	Seoul, South Korea
		Report	Khamis Mubarak 20', 53'; Khamis Thani 54'	Referee: Shariff (Singapore)

9 June 1993	South Korea	7–0	India	Seoul, South Korea
	Lee Ki-Bum 5', 25', 49'; Kim Tae-Young 37', 70'; Park Jung-bae 39'; Ha Seok-Ju 68'	Report		Referee: Al-Yenbua'awy (Saudi Arabia)

11 June 1993	India	1–2	Lebanon	Seoul, South Korea
	Bhupinder Thakur 34'	Report	Hassan Ayoub 41'; Rafi Joulfagi 79'	Referee: Wei Jihong (China)

13 June 1993	Hong Kong	1–3	India	Seoul, South Korea
	Wong Chi Keung 66'	Report	I. M. Vijayan 6', 77'; Bhupinder Thakur 55'	Referee: Ali (Iraq)

=== 1998 FIFA World Cup qualification (AFC) ===
Pos	Team	Pld	W	D	L	GF	GA	GD	Pts	Qualification
1	Qatar	3	3	0	0	14	0	+14	9	Final round
2	Sri Lanka	3	1	1	1	4	4	0	4	
3	India	3	1	1	1	3	7	−4	4	
4	Philippines	3	0	0	3	0	10	−10	0	

Source: RSSSF

==== Group 10 ====
21 September 1996	India	2–0	Philippines	Khalifa International Stadium, Doha, Qatar
	Vijayan 81'; Coutinho 85'	(report)		Attendance: 700; Referee: Omar Ali Al Shughair (Saudi Arabia)

24 September 1996	Sri Lanka	1–1	India	Khalifa International Stadium, Doha, Qatar
	Silva 14'	(report)	Chapman 39'	Attendance: 400; Referee: Ammar Ammar (Lebanon)

27 September 1996	Qatar	6–0	India	Khalifa International Stadium, Doha, Qatar
	Al-Enazi 27', 40'; Zamel Al Kuwari 42'; Maayof 47'; Soufi 52'; Fazli 61'	(report)		Attendance: 3,000; Referee: Omar Ali Al Shughair (Saudi Arabia)

=== 2002 FIFA World Cup qualification (AFC) ===
==== First round ====
Group 8

Pos	Team	Pld	W	D	L	GF	GA	GD	Pts	Qualification
1	United Arab Emirates	6	4	0	2	21	5	+16	12	Second round
2	Yemen	6	3	2	1	14	8	+6	11	
3	India	6	3	2	1	11	5	+6	11	
4	Brunei	6	0	0	6	0	28	−28	0	

Source: RSSSF

8 April 2001	India	1–0	United Arab Emirates	Bangalore Stadium, Bangalore
16:00 UTC+05:30	Jules Alberto 71'	Report		Attendance: 12,000; Referee: Sun Baojie (China)

15 April 2001	India	1–1	Yemen	Bangalore Stadium, Bangalore
16:00 UTC+05:30	Bhutia 53'	Report	Al Ghurbani 43'	Attendance: 21,000; Referee: Chalach Piromya (Thailand)

26 April 2001	United Arab Emirates	1–0	India	Sheikh Khalifa International Stadium, Al Ain City
19:30 UTC+04	Khater 63'	Report		Attendance: 12,000; Referee: Halim Abdul Hamid (Malaysia)

4 May 2001	Yemen	3–3	India	Althawra Sports City Stadium, Sanaa
16:00 UTC+03	Al-Salimi 13' (pen.), 20', 62'	Report	Ancheri 16', 38'; Vijayan 51'	Attendance: 25,000; Referee: Suleman Abo Allo (Syria)

11 May 2001	Brunei	0–1	India	Sultan Hassal Bolkiah Stadium, Bandar Seri Begawan
20:15 UTC+07		Report	Ancheri 75'	Attendance: 4,000; Referee: Hassan Al Ajmi (Oman)

20 May 2001	India	5–0	Brunei	Bangalore Stadium, Bangalore
16:00 UTC+05:30	Jules Alberto 12'; Vijayan 23'; Bhutia 35' (pen.); Ancheri 59'; Hakim 80'	Report		Attendance: 7,000; Referee: Nail Lutfullin (Uzbekistan)

=== 2006 FIFA World Cup qualification (AFC) ===
==== Second round ====
Group 3

Pos	Team	Pld	W	D	L	GF	GA	GD	Pts	Qualification	Japan national football team	Oman national football team	India national football team	Singapore national football team
1	Japan	6	6	0	0	16	1	+15	18	Third round	—	1–0	7–0	1–0
2	Oman	6	3	1	2	14	3	+11	10		0–1	—	0–0	7–0
3	India	6	1	1	4	2	18	−16	4		0–4	1–5	—	1–0
4	Singapore	6	1	0	5	3	13	−10	3		1–2	0–2	2–0	—

Rules for classification: Tiebreakers

18 February 2004	India	1–0	Singapore	Fatorda Stadium, Margao
16:00	Renedy 50'	Report		Attendance: 28,000; Referee: Farajollah Yasrebi (Iran)

31 March 2004	India	1–5	Oman	Jawaharlal Nehru Stadium, Kochi
17:45	Renedy 18'	Report	Amad Ali 12'; Ahmed Mubarak 26', 49'; Al-Hinai 60', 88'	Attendance: 48,000; Referee: Danny Kim Heng (Malaysia)

9 June 2004	Japan	7–0	India	Saitama Stadium, Saitama
19:20	Kubo 12'; Fukunishi 25'; Nakamura 29'; Suzuki 54'; Nakazawa 65', 76'; Ogasawara 68'	Report		Attendance: 63,000; Referee: Huang Junjie (China PR)

8 September 2004	India	0–4	Japan	Yuva Bharati Krirangan, Bidhannagar
17:30		Report	Suzuki 45'; Ono 60'; Fukunishi 71'; Miyamoto 87'	Attendance: 90,000; Referee: Basel Hajjar (Syria)

13 October 2004	Singapore	2–0	India	Jalan Besar Stadium, Singapore
19:30	Sahdan 73'; Amri 76'	Report		Attendance: 3,609; Referee: Yousuf Husain (Bahrain)

17 November 2004	Oman	0–0	India	Sultan Qaboos Sports Complex, Muscat
18:00		Report		Attendance: 2,000; Referee: Mahmoud Nurilddin (Iraq)

=== 2010 FIFA World Cup qualification (AFC) ===
==== First round ====
Team 1	Agg.	Team 2	1st leg	2nd leg
Lebanon	6–3	India	4–1	2–2

8 October 2007	Lebanon	4–1	India	Saida Municipal Stadium, Saida
21:00 UTC+3	Antar 33'; Ghaddar 62', 76'; El Ali 63'	Report	Chhetri 30'	Attendance: 500; Referee: Saad Al Fahdli (Kuwait)

30 October 2007	India	2–2	Lebanon	Fatorda Stadium, Goa (Note: Match originally scheduled for 28 October 2007 postponed and relocated due to heavy rain in Chennai.)
15:00 UTC+5:30	Chhetri 29'; Dias 90+2'	Report	Ghaddar 72' (pen.), 85'	Attendance: 10,000; Referee: Salem Mujghef (Jordan)

Lebanon won 6 – 3 on aggregate and advanced to the Third Round.

=== 2014 FIFA World Cup qualification (AFC) ===
==== Second round ====
Team 1	Agg.	Team 2	1st leg	2nd leg
United Arab Emirates	5–2	India	3–0	2–2

23 July 2011	United Arab Emirates	3–0	India	Sheikh Khalifa International Stadium, Al Ain
20:00 UTC+4	Al Kamali 21' (pen.); Al Shehhi 29' (pen.); Al Hammadi 81'	Report		Attendance: 3,179; Referee: Banjar Al-Dosari (Qatar)

28 July 2011	India	2–2	United Arab Emirates	Ambedkar Stadium, New Delhi
19:00 UTC+5:30	Lalpekhula 74'; Singh 90+2'	Report	Al Shehhi 40'; Al-Wehaibi 72'	Attendance: 13,000; Referee: Abdul Malik Abdul Bashir (Singapore)

United Arab Emirates won 5–2 on aggregate and advanced to the third round.

=== 2018 FIFA World Cup qualification (AFC) ===
==== First round ====
Team 1	Agg.	Team 2	1st leg	2nd leg
India	2–0	Nepal	2–0	0–0

12 March 2015	India	2–0	Nepal	Indira Gandhi Athletic Stadium, Guwahati
19:00 UTC+5:30	Chhetri 53', 70'	Report (FIFA); Report (AFC)		Attendance: 11,200; Referee: Aziz Asimov (Uzbekistan)

17 March 2015	Nepal	0–0	India	Dasarath Rangasala Stadium, Kathmandu
15:30 UTC+5:45		Report (FIFA); Report (AFC)		Attendance: 10,500; Referee: Khamis Al-Marri (Qatar)

India won 2–0 on aggregate and advanced to the second round.

==== Second round ====
===== Group D =====
Pos	Team	Pld	W	D	L	GF	GA	GD	Pts	Qualification	Iran	Oman	Turkmenistan	Guam	India
1	Iran	8	6	2	0	26	3	+23	20	World Cup qualifying third round and Asian Cup	—	2–0	3–1	6–0	4–0
2	Oman	8	4	2	2	11	7	+4	14	Asian Cup qualifying third round	1–1	—	3–1	1–0	3–0
3	Turkmenistan	8	4	1	3	10	11	−1	13	Asian Cup qualifying third round	1–1	2–1	—	1–0	2–1
4	Guam	8	2	1	5	3	16	−13	7	Asian Cup qualifying third round	0–6	0–0	1–0	—	2–1
5	India	8	1	0	7	5	18	−13	3	Asian Cup qualifying play-off round	0–3 (Note: FIFA awarded Iran a 3–0 win as a result of India fielding the ineligible player Eugeneson Lyngdoh. The match initially ended 3–0 to Iran.)	1–2	1–2	1–0	—

Rules for classification: Qualification tiebreakers
Notes:

11 June 2015	India	1–2	Oman	Sree Kanteerava Stadium, Bangalore
19:00 UTC+5:30	Chhetri 26'	Report (FIFA); Report (AFC)	Said 1'; Al-Hosni 40' (pen.)	Attendance: 19,312; Referee: Ko Hyung-jin (South Korea)

16 June 2015	Guam	2–1	India	Guam F.A. National Training Center, Dededo
16:15 UTC+10	McDonald 37'; Nicklaw 62'	Report (FIFA); Report (AFC)	Chhetri 90+3'	Attendance: 3,277; Referee: Võ Minh Trí (Vietnam)

8 September 2015	India	0–3; Awarded (Note: FIFA awarded Iran a 3–0 win as a result of India fielding the ineligible player Eugeneson Lyngdoh. The match initially ended 3–0 to Iran.)	Iran	Sree Kanteerava Stadium, Bangalore
19:00 UTC+5:30		Report (FIFA); Report (AFC)	Azmoun 28'; Teymourian 46'; Taremi 49'	Attendance: 14,500; Referee: Ammar Al-Jeneibi (United Arab Emirates)

8 October 2015	Turkmenistan	2–1	India	Köpetdag Stadium, Ashgabat
18:00 UTC+5	Abylow 8'; Amanow 60'	Report (FIFA); Report (AFC)	Lalpekhlua 28'	Attendance: 20,100; Referee: Masoud Tufayelieh (Syria)

13 October 2015	Oman	3–0	India	Sultan Qaboos Sports Complex, Muscat
18:30 UTC+4	Mubarak 55'; Al-Muqbali 67', 84'	Report (FIFA); Report (AFC)		Attendance: 11,000; Referee: Fahad Al-Marri (Qatar)

12 November 2015	India	1–0	Guam	Sree Kanteerava Stadium, Bangalore
19:00 UTC+5:30	R. Singh 10'	Report (FIFA); Report (AFC)		Attendance: 6,277; Referee: Jarred Gillett (Australia)

24 March 2016	Iran	4–0	India	Azadi Stadium, Tehran
19:00 UTC+4:30	Hajsafi 33' (pen.), 66' (pen.); Azmoun 61'; Jahanbakhsh 78'	Report (FIFA); Report (AFC)		Attendance: 29,160; Referee: Võ Minh Trí (Vietnam)

29 March 2016	India	1–2	Turkmenistan	Jawaharlal Nehru Stadium, Kochi
18:00 UTC+5:30	Jhingan 26'	Report (FIFA); Report (AFC)	Amanow 48'; Ataýew 70'	Attendance: 3,111; Referee: Khamis Al-Marri (Qatar)

=== 2022 FIFA World Cup qualification ===
==== Second round ====
- All matches since 19 November 2019 were played in a centralised venue due to the COVID-19 pandemic in Asia
- Also all matches were rescheduled from their original dates.

Group E

Pos	Team	Pld	W	D	L	GF	GA	GD	Pts	Qualification	Qatar	Oman	India	Afghanistan	Bangladesh
1	Qatar (Note: Qatar has already qualified for the World Cup as the host nation. They are later selected as host replacement within the qualified teams of the Asian Cup.)	8	7	1	0	18	1	+17	22	Asian Cup	—	2–1	0–0	6–0	5–0
2	Oman	8	6	0	2	16	6	+10	18	World Cup qualifying third round and Asian Cup	0–1	—	1–0	3–0	4–1
3	India	8	1	4	3	6	7	−1	7	Asian Cup qualifying third round	0–1	1–2	—	1–1	1–1
4	Afghanistan	8	1	3	4	5	15	−10	6	Asian Cup qualifying third round	0–1	1–2	1–1	—	1–0
5	Bangladesh	8	0	2	6	3	19	−16	2	Asian Cup qualifying third round	0–2	0–3	0–2	1–1	—

Source: FIFA
Rules for classification: Qualification tiebreakers
Notes:

5 September 2019	India	1–2	Oman	Guwahati, India
19:30 UTC+5:30	Chhetri 24'	Report (FIFA); Report (AFC)	Al-Alawi 82', 90'	Stadium: Indira Gandhi Athletic Stadium; Attendance: 22,798; Referee: Mooud Bonyadifar (Iran)

10 September 2019	Qatar	0–0	India	Doha, Qatar
19:30 UTC+3		Report (FIFA); Report (AFC)		Stadium: Jassim Bin Hamad Stadium; Attendance: 12,020; Referee: Nazmi Nasaruddin (Malaysia)

15 October 2019	India	1–1	Bangladesh	Kolkata, India
19:30 UTC+5:30	Khan 88'	Report (FIFA); Report (AFC)	Uddin 42'	Stadium: Salt Lake Stadium; Attendance: 53,286; Referee: Masoud Tufayelieh (Syria)

14 November 2019	Afghanistan	1–1	India	Dushanbe, Tajikistan
19:00 UTC+5	Nazary 45+1'	Report (FIFA); Report (AFC)	Doungel 90+3'	Stadium: Central Republican Stadium; Attendance: 8,100; Referee: Yu Ming-hsun (Chinese Taipei)

19 November 2019	Oman	1–0	India	Muscat, Oman
19:00 UTC+4	Al-Ghassani 33'	Report (FIFA); Report (AFC)		Stadium: Sultan Qaboos Sports Complex; Attendance: 24,250; Referee: Nivon Robesh Gamini (Sri Lanka)

3 June 2021	India	0–1	Qatar	Doha, Qatar
20:00 UTC+3		Report (FIFA); Report (AFC)	Hatem 33'	Stadium: Jassim bin Hamad Stadium; Attendance: 2,022; Referee: Ma Ning (China)

7 June 2021	Bangladesh	0–2	India	Doha, Qatar
17:00 UTC+3		Report (FIFA); Report (AFC)	Chhetri 79', 90+2'	Stadium: Jassim bin Hamad Stadium; Attendance: 495; Referee: Zaid Thamer (Iraq)

15 June 2021	India	1–1	Afghanistan	Doha, Qatar
17:00 UTC+3	Azizi 75' (o.g.)	Report (FIFA); Report (AFC)	Zamani 81'	Stadium: Jassim bin Hamad Stadium; Referee: Ali Reda (Lebanon)

=== 2026 FIFA World Cup qualification (AFC) ===
==== Second round ====
Group A

Pos	Team	Pld	W	D	L	GF	GA	GD	Pts	Qualification	(Qatar)	(Kuwait)	(India)	(Afghanistan)
1	Qatar	6	5	1	0	18	3	+15	16	World Cup qualifying third round and Asian Cup	—	3–0	2–1	8–1
2	Kuwait	6	2	1	3	6	6	0	7	World Cup qualifying third round and Asian Cup	1–2	—	0–1	1–0
3	India	6	1	2	3	3	7	−4	5	Asian Cup qualifying third round	0–3	0–0	—	1–2
4	Afghanistan	6	1	2	3	3	14	−11	5	Asian Cup qualifying third round	0–0	0–4	0–0	—

Source: FIFA, AFC
Rules for classification: Tiebreakers

16 November 2023 2026 WCQ / 2027 ACQ	Kuwait	0–1	India	Kuwait City, Kuwait
19:30 UTC+3		FIFA	Manvir 75'	Stadium: Jaber Al-Ahmad International Stadium; Attendance: 32,786; Referee: Shaun Evans (Australia)

21 November 2023 2026 WCQ / 2027 ACQ	India	0–3	Qatar	Bhubaneswar, India
19:00 UTC+5:30		FIFA	Meshaal 4'; Ali 47'; Abdurisag 86'	Stadium: Kalinga Stadium; Attendance: 11,389; Referee: Sivakorn Pu-udom (Thailand)

21 March 2024 2026 WCQ / 2027 ACQ	Afghanistan	0–0	India	Abha, Saudi Arabia (Note: Afghanistan will play their home matches at a neutral venue due to the ongoing Afghan conflict.)
22:00 UTC+3		FIFA		Stadium: Prince Sultan bin Abdulaziz Sports City; Attendance: 3,900; Referee: Kim Hee-gon (South Korea)

26 March 2024 2026 WCQ / 2027 ACQ	India	1–2	Afghanistan	Guwahati, India
19:00 UTC+5:30	Chhetri 38' (pen.)	FIFA	Akbari 70'; Mukhammad 88' (pen.)	Stadium: IGA Stadium; Attendance: 8,932; Referee: Mohammed Al-Hoish (Saudi Arabia)

6 June 2024 2026 World Cup qualification	India	0–0	Kuwait	Kolkata, India
19:00 UTC+5:30		FIFA		Stadium: Salt Lake Stadium; Attendance: 58,932; Referee: Fu Ming (China)

11 June 2024 2026 World Cup qualification	Qatar	2–1	India	Al Rayyan, Qatar
18:45 UTC+3	Aymen 73'; Al-Rawi 90'	FIFA	Chhangte 37'	Stadium: Ahmad bin Ali Stadium; Attendance: 2,816; Referee: Kim Woosung (South Korea)

== Statistics ==
=== Results by opponent ===
India has played against 22 different nations during FIFA World Cup qualification.

- Matches played from the 1986 edition to the 1994 edition had been provided with 2 points for a win, 1 for a draw and 0 for a loss.
- Matches played thereafter have been provided with 3 points for a win, 1 for a draw and 0 for a loss.

This is the performance table as of 16 June 2024.

Team	Pld	W	D	L	GF	GA	GD	Pts
Bangladesh	4	3	1	0	7	3	+4	8
Brunei	2	2	0	0	6	0	+6	6
Nepal	2	1	1	0	2	0	+2	4
United Arab Emirates	4	1	1	2	3	6	−3	4
Philippines	1	1	0	0	2	0	+2	3
Kuwait	2	1	1	0	1	0	+1	4
Guam	2	1	0	1	2	2	0	3
Singapore	2	1	0	1	1	2	−1	3
Hong Kong	2	1	0	1	4	3	+1	2
Yemen	2	0	2	0	4	4	0	2
Afghanistan	4	0	3	1	3	4	-1	3
Thailand	2	0	2	0	1	1	0	2
Lebanon	4	0	2	2	6	10	−4	2
Sri Lanka	1	0	1	0	1	1	0	1
Indonesia	2	0	1	1	2	3	−1	1
Oman	6	0	1	5	3	13	−10	1
Qatar	5	0	1	4	1	12	−10	1
Turkmenistan	2	0	0	2	2	4	−2	0
Bahrain	2	0	0	2	1	5	−4	0
Iran	2	0	0	2	0	7	−7	0
South Korea	2	0	0	2	0	10	−10	0
Japan	2	0	0	2	0	11	−11	0

2026 qualification opponents

== See also ==
- History of the India national football team
- Football at the Summer Olympics
- India national football team at the Olympics
- India at the AFC Asian Cup
- Football at the Asian Games
- India national football team at the Asian Games
