= India at the AFC Asian Cup =

National football delegation

Since the AFC Asian Cup was founded in 1956, India has qualified for five Asian Cups, in 1964, 1984, 2011, 2019 and 2023.

The team played their first Asian Cup in 1964. It was India's best finish in the continental competition which came 55 years ago when they finished runners-up. In 1964, India gained a direct qualification to the finals of the tournament after several Western Zone teams pulled out due to the participation of Israel. 14 years after the country missed out on FIFA World Cup participation, the India national team had earned the opportunity to take centre stage in Asian football under English coach Harry Wright. Played in a round-robin format, the 1964 edition of the Asian Cup was won by hosts Israel but it had only four participants - one team from each zone. And with wins over South Korea and Hong Kong, India cemented second place. Inder Singh became team's top scorer with two goals.

The team had to wait 20 years to qualify for the finals again. Once they did qualify, a group stage disaster awaited the Men in Blue. The 10 participants were divided into two groups of five and India were placed in Group B alongside China PR, Iran, UAE and hosts Singapore. India lost three games and held Iran to a goalless draw to come away with a just a point in 1984. Saudi Arabia clinched their first Asian title, defeating China PR in the final. The legendary Krishanu Dey was part of Serbian coach Milovan Ćirić's India national team that battled it out with heavyweights like China PR and Iran.

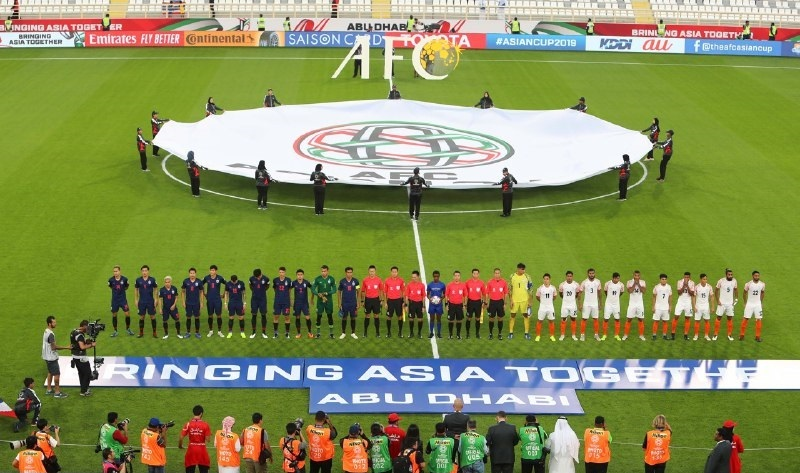
India against Thailand at the 2019 AFC Asian Cup.

The 2011 AFC Asian Cup in Qatar marked India's third continental campaign. The Blues qualified on the virtue of being the winners of the 2008 AFC Challenge Cup. A Sunil Chhetri hat-trick and a goal by Bhaichung Bhutia helped hosts India defeat Tajikistan in the final of the Challenge Cup and qualify for the Asian Cup for the first time in 27 years. Drawn into Group C from Pot 4, the Blues lost all three of their group games to get dumped out of the tournament without any points on the board. Tim Cahill's brace helped Australia register a 4–0 win against India in the group opener. Gouramangi Singh and Chhetri scored in either half as India lost 2–5 to Bahrain and Chhetri's first-half spot-kick was the team's only consolation as South Korea thrashed them 1–4 in the final game in Group C.

Eight years later, India national team qualified and was set to travel to UAE for the 2019 AFC Asian Cup under head coach Stephen Constantine. The team won their opening match against Thailand with the help of Sunil Chhetri's brace and broke the 55 years winless drought. However, India lost two remaining matches and crashed out from the group stage for the third consecutive participation.

India qualified for the 2023 AFC Asian Cup by topping their group in the third round of qualifiers by winning all 3 of their games against Afghanistan, Hong Kong & Cambodia. This was first time India qualified in back-to-back Asian Cups. In the tournament, India lost all 3 matches, ending their campaign. This was also the first time in India's history they ended their Asian Cup Campaign without a point or a goal.

== Record ==
AFC Asian Cup record										AFC Asian Cup qualification record					
Host / Year	Result	Position	Pld	W	D	L	GF	GA	Squad	Pld	W	D	L	GF	GA
(Hong Kong) 1956	Did not enter									Did not enter					
(South Korea) 1960	Did not qualify									6	2	0	4	7	9
(Israel) 1964	Runners-up	2nd	3	2	0	1	5	3	Squad	Bye					
(Iran) 1968	Did not qualify									3	0	1	2	2	6
(Thailand) 1972	Did not enter									Did not enter					
(Iran) 1976	Did not enter									Did not enter					
(Kuwait) 1980	Did not enter									Did not enter					
(Singapore) 1984	Group stage	10th	4	0	1	3	0	7	Squad	4	3	0	1	8	2
(Qatar) 1988	Did not qualify									5	0	1	4	0	6
(Japan) 1992	Did not qualify									2	1	0	1	2	3
(United Arab Emirates) 1996	Did not qualify									2	0	0	2	3	12
(Lebanon) 2000	Did not qualify									4	1	1	2	8	9
(China) 2004	Did not qualify									2	0	1	1	1	3
(Indonesia) (Malaysia) (Thailand) (Vietnam) 2007	Did not qualify									6	0	0	6	2	24
(Qatar) 2011	Group stage	16th	3	0	0	3	3	13	Squad	2008 AFC Challenge Cup winners					
(Australia) 2015	Did not qualify									Failed to win 2012 & did not qualify for 2014 AFC Challenge Cup					
(United Arab Emirates) 2019	Group stage	17th	3	1	0	2	4	4	Squad	18	8	2	8	25	24
(Qatar) 2023	Group stage	24th	3	0	0	3	0	6	Squad	11	4	4	3	14	8
(Saudi Arabia) 2027	Did not qualify									12	2	4	6	7	13
Totals	Runners-up	5/19	16	3	1	12	12	33		75	21	15	39	80	119

== 1964 AFC Asian Cup ==
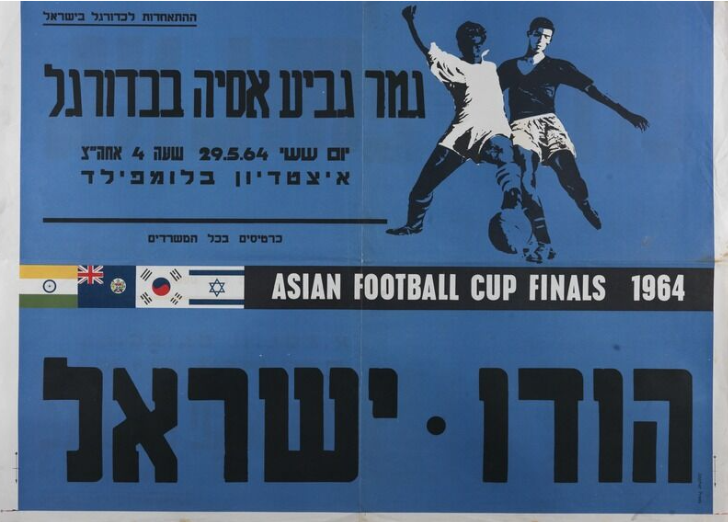
A poster advertising India vs Israel match on 29 May 1964, at 4 pm, at Bloomfield stadium in Jaffa, Israel

Pos	Team	Pld	W	D	L	GF	GA	GD	Pts	Qualification
1	Israel (H)	3	3	0	0	5	1	+4	6	Champions
2	India	3	2	0	1	5	3	+2	4	Runners-up
3	South Korea	3	1	0	2	2	4	−2	2	Third place
4	Hong Kong	3	0	0	3	1	5	−4	0	Fourth place

Source: RSSSF
(H) Hosts
27 May 1964
16:30

South Korea	0–2	India
		Appalaraju 2'; I. Singh 57'

Municipal Stadium, Haifa
Attendance: 7,000
Referee: Davoud Nassiri (Iran)

29 May 1964
16:00

Israel	2–0	India
Spiegler 29' (pen.); Yohai Aharoni 76'

Bloomfield Stadium, Tel Aviv
Attendance: 20,000
Referee: Li Pak Tung (Malaysia)

2 June 1964
16:30

India	3–1	Hong Kong
I. Singh 45'; Samajpati 60'; Goswami 77'		Cheung Yiu Kwok 39'

Bloomfield Stadium, Tel Aviv
Attendance: 5,000
Referee: Patrick Nice (Malaysia)

== 1984 AFC Asian Cup ==
=== Group B ===
Team	Pld	W	D	L	GF	GA	GD	Pts
China	4	3	0	1	10	2	+8	6
Iran	4	2	2	0	6	1	+5	6
United Arab Emirates	4	2	0	2	3	8	−5	4
Singapore	4	1	1	2	3	4	−1	3
India	4	0	1	3	0	7	−7	1

2 December 1984
21:00

Singapore	2–0	India
Awab 36'; Saad 81'	Report

National Stadium, Singapore
Attendance: 21,000
Referee: Antonio Márquez (Mexico)

4 December 1984
19:00

United Arab Emirates	2–0	India
Al-Talyani 81'; Khamees 88'	Report

National Stadium, Singapore
Attendance: 2,010
Referee: Abu Wahid Shanbe (Oman)

7 December 1984
19:00

Iran	0–0	India
	Report

National Stadium, Singapore
Attendance: 10,000
Referee: Koh Guan Kiat (Malaysia)

9 December 1984
21:00

China	3–0	India
Lin Lefeng 19'; Gu Guangming 59'; Jia Xiuquan 79'	Report

National Stadium, Singapore
Attendance: 8,256
Referee: Ahmed Jassim (Bahrain)

== 2011 AFC Asian Cup ==
=== Group C ===
Team	Pld	W	D	L	GF	GA	GD	Pts
Australia	3	2	1	0	6	1	+5	7
South Korea	3	2	1	0	7	3	+4	7
Bahrain	3	1	0	2	6	5	+1	3
India	3	0	0	3	3	13	−10	0

10 January 2011
16:15

India	0–4	Australia
		Cahill 11', 65'; Kewell 24'; Holman 45+1'

Jassim Bin Hamad Stadium, Doha
Attendance: 11,749
Referee: Ali Al Badwawi (UAE)
14 January 2011
19:15

Bahrain	5–2	India
Aaish 8' (pen.); Abdullatif 16', 19', 36', 77'		Gouramangi 9'; Chhetri 52'

Jassim Bin Hamad Stadium, Doha
Attendance: 11,032
Referee: Subkhiddin Mohd Salleh (Malaysia)
18 January 2011
16:15

South Korea	4–1	India
Ji Dong-Won 6', 23'; Koo Ja-Cheol 9'; Son Heung-Min 81'		Chhetri 12' (pen.)

Al Gharafa Stadium, Doha
Attendance: 11,366
Referee: Khalil Al Ghamdi (Saudi Arabia)

== 2019 AFC Asian Cup ==
=== Group A ===
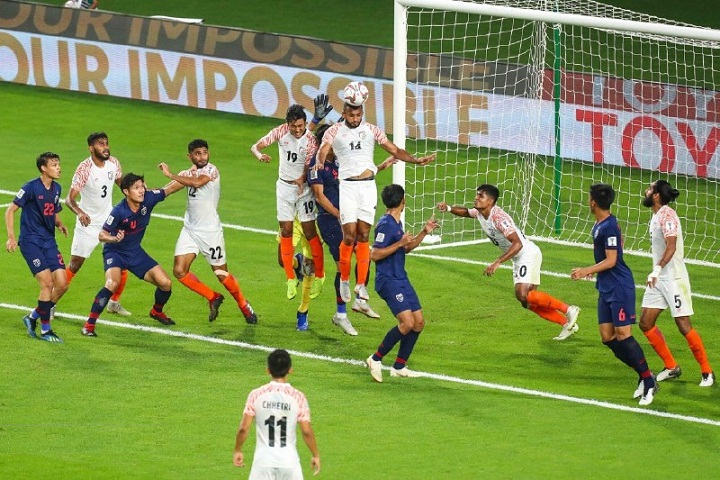
Indian team defending against Thailand attack at 2019 Asian Cup.

Pos	Team	Pld	W	D	L	GF	GA	GD	Pts	Qualification
1	United Arab Emirates (H)	3	1	2	0	4	2	+2	5	Advance to knockout stage
2	Thailand	3	1	1	1	3	5	−2	4 (Note: Head-to-head points: Thailand 3, Bahrain 0.)	Advance to knockout stage
3	Bahrain	3	1	1	1	2	2	0	4	Advance to knockout stage
4	India	3	1	0	2	4	4	0	3	

Source: AFC
(H) Hosts
Notes:
6 January 2019
17:30

Thailand	1–4	India
Teerasil 33'	Report	Chhetri 27' (pen.), 46'; Thapa 68'; Lalpekhlua 80'

Al Nahyan Stadium, Abu Dhabi
Attendance: 3,250
Referee: Liu Kwok Man (Hong Kong)

10 January 2019
20:00

India	0–2	United Arab Emirates
	Report	Khalf. Mubarak 41'; Mabkhout 88'

Zayed Sports City Stadium, Abu Dhabi
Attendance: 43,206
Referee: César Ramos (Mexico)

14 January 2019
20:00

India	0–1	Bahrain
	Report	Rashid 90+1' (pen.)

Sharjah Stadium, Sharjah
Attendance: 11,417
Referee: Ilgiz Tantashev (Uzbekistan)

== 2023 AFC Asian Cup ==
India qualified by finishing as group D winners in third round. This marked India's first ever consecutive Asian Cup qualification.

=== Group B ===
Pos	Team	Pld	W	D	L	GF	GA	GD	Pts	Qualification
1	Australia	3	2	1	0	4	1	+3	7	Advance to knockout stage
2	Uzbekistan	3	1	2	0	4	1	+3	5	Advance to knockout stage
3	Syria	3	1	1	1	1	1	0	4	Advance to knockout stage
4	India	3	0	0	3	0	6	−6	0	

Source: AFC
13 January 2024
14:30

Australia	2–0	India
Irvine 50'; Bos 73'	Report

Ahmad bin Ali Stadium, Al Rayyan
Attendance: 36,253
Referee: Yoshimi Yamashita (Japan)

18 January 2024
17:30

India	0–3	Uzbekistan
	Report	Fayzullaev 4'; Sergeev 18'; Nasrullaev 45+4'

Ahmad bin Ali Stadium, Al Rayyan
Attendance: 38,491
Referee: Fu Ming (China)

23 January 2024
14:30

Syria	1–0	India
Khribin 76'	Report

Al Bayt Stadium, Al Khor
Attendance: 42,787
Referee: Sivakorn Pu-udom (Thailand)

== Record by Opponent ==
AFC Asian Cup matches (by team)
Opponent	Wins	Draws	Losses	Total	Goals for	Goals against	Goal difference	Points
Australia	0	0	2	2	0	6	–6	0
Iran	0	1	0	1	0	0	0	1
Hong Kong	1	0	0	1	3	1	+2	3
Bahrain	0	0	2	2	2	6	–4	0
Uzbekistan	0	0	1	1	0	3	–3	0
Thailand	1	0	0	1	4	1	+3	3
South Korea	1	0	1	2	3	4	–1	3
Israel	0	0	1	1	0	2	–2	0
Singapore	0	0	1	1	0	2	–2	0
China	0	0	1	1	0	3	–3	0
United Arab Emirates	0	0	2	2	0	4	–4	0
Syria	0	0	1	1	0	1	–1	0
Total	3	1	12	16	12	33	–21	10

== Player records ==
=== Top goalscorers ===
Rank	Player	Goals	Years (goals)
1	Sunil Chhetri	4	2011 (2), 2019 (2)
2	Inder Singh	2	1964
3	K. Appalaraju	1	1964
3	Sukumar Samajpati	1	1964
3	Chuni Goswami	1	1964
3	Gouramangi Singh	1	2011
3	Anirudh Thapa	1	2019
3	Jeje Lalpekhlua	1	2019

=== Goals by tournament ===
No.	Player	Venue	Opponent	Date	Edition	Goals	Ref.
1	K. Appalaraju	Municipal Stadium, Haifa	South Korea	27 May 1964	1964	1	
2	Inder Singh	Municipal Stadium, Haifa	South Korea	27 May 1964	1964	1	
2	Inder Singh	Bloomfield Stadium, Tel Aviv	Hong Kong	2 June 1964	1964	1	
3	Sukumar Samajpati	Bloomfield Stadium, Tel Aviv	Hong Kong	2 June 1964	1964	1	
4	Chuni Goswami	Bloomfield Stadium, Tel Aviv	Hong Kong	2 June 1964	1964	1	
5	Gouramangi Singh	Jassim Bin Hamad Stadium, Doha	Bahrain	14 January 2011	2011	1	
6	Sunil Chhetri	Jassim Bin Hamad Stadium, Doha	Bahrain	14 January 2011	2011	1	
6	Sunil Chhetri	Al Gharafa Stadium, Doha	South Korea	18 January 2011	2011	1	
6	Sunil Chhetri	Al Nahyan Stadium, Abu Dhabi	Thailand	6 January 2019	2019	2	
7	Anirudh Thapa	Al Nahyan Stadium, Abu Dhabi	Thailand	6 January 2019	2019	1	
8	Jeje Lalpekhlua	Al Nahyan Stadium, Abu Dhabi	Thailand	6 January 2019	2019	1	

== See also ==
- History of the India national football team
- Football at the Summer Olympics
- India national football team at the Olympics
- India at the FIFA World Cup qualification
- Football at the Asian Games
- India national football team at the Asian Games
