= Novy Kapadia =

Indian football commentator (died 2021)

- Died: 18 November 2021; New Delhi
- Occupations: Football journalist, critic, commentator

Novy Kapadia (1952/53 – 18 November 2021) was an Indian football journalist, critic and commentator often considered to be India's foremost football expert and commentator.

== Biography ==
Kapadia grew up in Delhi at the time of vibrant footballing culture. He played for Delhi University Football Team, Junior nationals representing Delhi, a lot of local leagues and later started Ashoka Football Club in Delhi, where he was involved as coach, coach and later secretary in various time frames. He made a switch to sports journalism and was also a professor at SGTB Khasla College, Delhi University, where he served as University's Deputy Proctor from 2003 to 2010. In his last years, he faced problems in availing his pension from Delhi University and had to seek sports ministry assistance to cover his medical costs.

Kapadia was a Parsi Zoroastrian, and had written a number of books ranging from Sports, literary criticism and to his Parsi heritage. "Barefoot to Boots: The Many Lives of Indian Football" (2017) is one of the most popular books written by him. Kapadia suffered with a rare type of motor neurone disease and was confined to his house in last two years of his life, out of which last two months required life support. He died from it at the age of 68 on 18 November 2021 in New Delhi.

== Works ==
- Kapadia, Novy (2017). Barefoot to Boots: The Many Lives of Indian Football. Penguin Random House. ISBN 978-0-143-42641-7.
